= Thomas Grüter =

Swiss footballer (born 1966)

Personal information
- Date of birth: 8 December 1966 (age 59)
- Place of birth: Switzerland
- Height: 1.82 m (6 ft 0 in)
- Position: Goalkeeper

Youth career
- until 1978: SK Root
- 1978–1979: FC Luzern
- 1979–1985: FC Emmenbrücke

Senior career*
Years	Team	Apps	(Gls)
1985–1987	FC Emmenbrücke		
1987–1989	St. Gallen	25	(0)
1990–1997	FC Basel	134	(0)

International career
- Switzerland U16
- Switzerland U17
- * Club domestic league appearances and goals

Thomas Grüter (born 8 December 1966) is a Swiss footballer who played as a goalkeeper. He played in the second half of the 1980s and in the 1990s. He is now businessman and owns an advertising agency. Grüter works as a goalkeeping coach for Egyptian club Zamalek SC.

== Career ==
Grüter started his youth football with local team SK Root but he soon moved to FC Luzern. Another year later he moved on to FC Emmenbrücke. Grüter was called into the "student selection" of the SFV (including a game in England in front of 25,000 spectators) and later played for the Swiss U-16 and U-17. As a 16-year-old he played his debut with Emmenbrücke in the first division.

Grüter was considered as a greatly talented goalie and was "chased" by half of the teams in the Nationalliga A as he moved from FC Emmenbrücke to the play on the Espenmoos in the pre-season to the 1987–88 Nationalliga A campaign. He started for FC St. Gallen, as planned, as substitute goalkeeper behind regular keeper Bruno Huwyler, who for his part was no longer undisputed. He played his domestic league debut for FCSG on 23 April 1988 in a 2–0 defeat against Servette. The goal scorers were Karl-Heinz Rummenigge and John Eriksen and there were 13,000 spectators at that match on that day.

But Grüter had made it and he started the next season as a regular goalie under new head coach Kurt Jara. In August 1988 the team FCSG were humiliated by Servette in Geneva, but nobody blamed the goalie for the 7–1 defeat. Nevertheless, Grüter was henceforth referred to by a newspaper as an "uncertainty factor" or "fly catcher" and Jara declared he would keep a close eye on his goalkeeper. Then in November FCSG were defeated 2–0 by Young Boys and Grüter was demoted to third goalkeeper and from then on played in the reserve team.

But then came good an enquiry as good fortune for Grüter. FC Basel's goalkeeper Remo Brügger was ruled out for a long time following a traffic accident, and because the youth goalie was injured, Grüter was brought in on loan. In January 1989 Grüter joined Basel's first team during their 1988–89 season under head coach Urs Siegenthaler. After playing in five test games Grüter played his domestic league debut for his new club in the away game on 19 March as Basel played a 2–2 draw with CS Chênois. His loan contract came to an end at the end of the season, but Grüter refused to return to FC St. Gallen and because he had convinced trainer Siegenthaler so much, it was Brügger who went to St. Gallen in a player swap during the summer break.

Grüter played the following three seasons as regular goalkeeper. Despite the fact that Christian Reinwald transferred in for the 1992–93 season and that Swiss international goalkeeper Stefan Huber transferred in for the 1993–94 season, Grüter stayed with the club as second goalkeeper. During that season, under head-coach Claude Andrey, Grüter's team mates were the likes of Swiss international goalkeeper Stefan Huber, defenders Massimo Ceccaroni, Marco Walker and Samir Tabakovic, the midfielders Mario Cantaluppi, Martin Jeitziner, Admir Smajić and Ørjan Berg and the Swiss international strikers Dario Zuffi and Philippe Hertig. Together they won the promotion/relegation group and became Nationalliga B champions and thus won promotion to the top flight of Swiss football. This after six seasons in the second tier.

Grüter retired from active football in 1997. Between the years 1990 and 1997 Grüter played a total of 221 games for Basel. 134 of these games were in the Nationalliga B or Nationalliga A, 14 in the Swiss Cup and 73 were friendly games.

== Personal life ==
In the summer of 1997, Thomas Grüter hung his football boots on a hook. He went self-employed and started his own business, setting up an advertising agency. He later published the magazine “50 plus” and remained loyal to FC Basel, both emotionally and professionally, and was the publisher of "Joggeli-Magazin" (match program) with his company. He worked for FCB as a goalie coach under Christian Gross from 1999 to 2009. With Gross' discharge, Grüter's time in the football business also ended. Today he focuses on his projects in the publishing sector. Thomas Grüter, who lives in the Basel suburb of Binningen, no longer follows football events very closely. Quote Grüter: "I don't even have a television."

== Sources ==
- G for Grüter on FCSG-Data homepage
- Die ersten 125 Jahre. Publisher: Josef Zindel im Friedrich Reinhardt Verlag, Basel. ISBN 978-3-7245-2305-5
- Verein "Basler Fussballarchiv" Homepage
