= Markus Lichtsteiner =

Swiss footballer (born 1973)

Personal information
- Full name: Markus Lichtsteiner
- Date of birth: 14 February 1973 (age 53)
- Position: Defender

Senior career*
Years	Team	Apps	(Gls)
1993–1995	FC Basel	3	(1)
1995–1999	FC Riehen		
1999–2002	FC Concordia Basel		
2002–2003	FC Nordstern Basel		
2003–2006	FC Laufen		
2006–2010	BSC Old Boys		
- * Club domestic league appearances and goals

Markus Lichtsteiner (born 14 February 1973) is a Swiss former footballer who played in the 1990s and 2000s as defender.

Lichtsteiner played in the youth system of FC Basel and advanced to their first team for their 1993–94 season, signing his first professional contract under head-coach Claude Andrey. Lichtsteiner played his domestic league debut for his club in the away game on 19 August 1993 as Basel won 4–0 against Urania Genève Sport. Lichtsteiner scored his first goal for his club just two days later, on 21 August in the home game in the St. Jakob Stadium as Basel won 3–1 against Fribourg.

During this season his teammates were the likes of Swiss international goalkeeper Stefan Huber, defenders Massimo Ceccaroni, Marco Walker and Samir Tabakovic, the midfielders Mario Cantaluppi, Martin Jeitziner, Admir Smajić and Ørjan Berg and the Swiss international strikers Dario Zuffi and Philippe Hertig. Together they won the promotion/relegation group and became Nationalliga B champions and thus won promotion to the top flight of Swiss football. This after six seasons in the second tier.

After the promotion season Lichtsteiner stayed with the club for the following season, but did not come to any competition playing time. During his time with the club Lichsteiner played a total of eight games for Basel scoring that one mentioned goal. Three of these games were in the Nationalliga A and five were friendly games.

Following his time with Basel, Lichtsteiner moved on to play for local amateur club FC Riehen in the third tier of Swiss football. Lichtsteiner played for Riehen for four season, but after they suffered relegation at the end of the 1998–99 season he moved on. Lichtsteiner then signed semi-professional for Concordia Basel who played at the same level. At the end of the 2000–01 season Concordia won their 1st League group and qualified for the promotion play-offs. In the first round the beat Schötz 3–1 on aggregate. In the final round they beat Vaduz and drew with Serrières to become 1st League champions and win promotion to the Nationalliga B. Lichtsteiner stayed with the club for the following season, obtaining a professional contract as he was a regular starter in the team. He played 30 league matches, scoring one goal, but at the end of the season he moved on.

Lichtsteiner moved to play the 2002–03 season for local amateur club FC Nordstern Basel and the following three seasons for FC Laufen in the fourth tier of Swiss football. With Laufen he won promotion in the 2004–05 season. In summer 2006 Lichsteiner moved on to play for BSC Old Boys and with them he won promotion in the 2007–08. He ended his active playing career in 2010.

== Sources ==
- Die ersten 125 Jahre. Publisher: Josef Zindel im Friedrich Reinhardt Verlag, Basel. ISBN 978-3-7245-2305-5
- Verein "Basler Fussballarchiv" Homepage
