= Didier Gigon =

Swiss footballer (born 1968)

Personal information
- Full name: Didier Gigon
- Date of birth: 10 March 1968 (age 58)
- Place of birth: Porrentruy, Switzerland
- Height: 1.77 m (5 ft 10 in)
- Position: Midfielder

Senior career*
Years	Team	Apps	(Gls)
1986–1988	FC Biel-Bienne	37	(7)
1988–1991	Neuchâtel Xamax	58	(4)
1991–1993	Lausanne-Sport	47	(5)
1993–1995	FC Basel	35	(1)
1995–1998	Neuchâtel Xamax	66	(4)
1998–1999	Sing Tao		
1999	F.C. Alverca		
1999–2000	Neuchâtel Xamax	35	(1)
2000–2001	Étoile Carouge	16	(4)

International career
1990	Switzerland	1	(0)
- * Club domestic league appearances and goals

Didier Gigon (born 10 March 1968) is a Swiss former footballer who played as a midfielder during the 1980s, 1990s and early 2000s.

== Football career ==
Born in Biel/Bienne, Gigon started playing professionally with his local side FC Biel-Bienne in 1986 before moving to Neuchâtel Xamax in 1988. In 1991, he signed for Lausanne-Sport then moved on in 1993.

During the winter break of the 1993–94 Nationalliga A/B season, Gigon joined FC Basel under head-coach Claude Andrey. At that time Basel played in the Nationalliga B, the second tier of Swiss football. Gigon made his debut for his new club in the Swiss Cup home game in the St. Jakob Stadium on 12 February 1994 as Basel won 1–0 against Neuchâtel Xamax. He played his domestic league debut for the club in the away game in the Espenmoos on 27 February as Basel played a goalless draw with St. Gallen. His teammates in Basel's 1993–94 season were the likes of Swiss international goalkeeper Stefan Huber, defenders Massimo Ceccaroni, Marco Walker and Samir Tabakovic, the midfielders Mario Cantaluppi, Martin Jeitziner, Admir Smajić and Ørjan Berg and the Swiss international strikers Dario Zuffi and Philippe Hertig. Together they won the promotion/relegation group and became Nationalliga B champions and thus won promotion to the top flight of Swiss football. This after six seasons in the second tier.

After their promotion, Gigon stayed with Basel for another season. He scored his first league goal for the club in the home game on 31 May 1995. It was the first goal of the match, but it did not save the team from a 1–2 defeat against Neuchâtel Xamax. During his one and a half years with the club Gigon played a total of 58 games for Basel scoring a total of five goals. 35 of these games were in the domestic league, five in the Swiss Cup, one in the UEFA Intertoto Cup and 17 were friendly games. He scored one goal in the domestic league, one in the cup and the other three were scored during the test games.

Gigon then returned to Neuchâtel Xamax where he played for three seasons. During the 1998–99 season he played for Sing Tao of Hong Kong and Portugal's F.C. Alverca and returned to Switzerland late in the season to play for Neuchâtel Xamax for a third time. Étoile Carouge signed him in 2000, and he retired in the summer of 2001.

He earned one cap for the Swiss national team on 3 April 1990 in the Stadion Allmend, Luzern, as Switzerland won 2–1 against Romania.

== Honours ==
Neuchâtel Xamax

- Swiss Super Cup: 1988, 1990

== Sources ==
- Die ersten 125 Jahre. Publisher: Josef Zindel im Friedrich Reinhardt Verlag, Basel. ISBN 978-3-7245-2305-5
- Verein "Basler Fussballarchiv" Homepage
