= Roger Schreiber =

Swiss footballer (born 1976)

Personal information
- Full name: Roger Schreiber
- Date of birth: 21 January 1976 (age 50)
- Height: 1.66 m (5 ft 5 in)
- Position: Striker

Youth career
- until 1993: FC Basel

Senior career*
Years	Team	Apps	(Gls)
1993–1996	FC Basel	4	(0)
1996–1998	SV Muttenz		
1998	FC Concordia Basel		
1999	FC Baden	9	(1)
1999–2001	SV Muttenz		
2001–2002	FC Concordia Basel	19	(3)
2002–2003	FC Gelterkinden		

Managerial career
- 2008–2017: FC Gelterkinden (youth)
- 2017–2018: FC Gelterkinden (assistant)
- 2018–2020: FC Gelterkinden
- * Club domestic league appearances and goals

Roger Schreiber (born 21 January 1976) is a Swiss former footballer who played in the 1990s and 2000s as striker.

== Football career ==
Schreiber played his youth football by FC Basel and advanced to their first team for their 1993–94 season and signed his first professional contract under head-coach Claude Andrey. After playing in three test games Schreiber played his domestic league debut for the club in the away game on 14 August 1993 as Basel won 3–0 against SR Delémont. During that season his teammates were the likes of Swiss international goalkeeper Stefan Huber, defenders Massimo Ceccaroni, Marco Walker and Samir Tabakovic, the midfielders Mario Cantaluppi, Martin Jeitziner, Admir Smajić and Ørjan Berg and the Swiss international strikers Dario Zuffi and Philippe Hertig. Together they won the promotion/relegation group and became Nationalliga B champions and thus won promotion to the top flight of Swiss football. This after six seasons in the second tier.

Following the promotion season he stayed with the club for another two seasons before he moved on. During his time with the club, Schreiber played a total of 14 games for Basel without scoring a goal. Four of these games were in the Nationalliga B and Nationalliga A, one was in the UEFA Intertoto Cup and nine were friendly games.

Following his time with Basel, Schreiber moved on and played two seasons for local amateur club SV Muttenz. He then played six months for local club FC Concordia Basel before he played six months for FC Baden. With Baden he made nine appearances in the Nationalliga B, scoring one goal. He then returned to Muttenz for another two seasons. For the season 2001–02 Schreiber transferred to FC Concordia Basel. He played as regular in their team and had teammates such as Arjan Peço and Marco Streller. Schreiber played 19 games, scoring three goals, one on 28 July against SR Delémont and two on 31 August against Kriens. Despite a mediocre first stage of the season, in the second stage the team was able to avoid relegation.

Following his season with Concordia, Schreiber decided to reduce his football and moved on to local amateur club FC Gelterkinden. He later became coach.

== Private life ==
Roger Schreiber married Denise in 1999 and they have two sons, Kevin born in 2000 and Loris born in 2006. Both sons play football, Kevin plays for Black Stars and Loris plays in the youth system by FC Basel. The family Schreiber live in Gelterkinden. From 2008 Roger Schreiber was coach for local amateur club FC Gelterkinden, first with the youth teams and finally for their first team. He resigned from this job at the end of the season 2019–20.

Schreiber did his apprenticeship as a commercial clerk, completing this in 1995, and worked as such until 2002. Since then, he is driving instructor and owns his own driving school.

== Sources ==
- Die ersten 125 Jahre. Publisher: Josef Zindel im Friedrich Reinhardt Verlag, Basel. ISBN 978-3-7245-2305-5
- Verein "Basler Fussballarchiv" Homepage
