= Sergei Derkach =

Russian footballer

Personal information
- Full name: Sergei Petrovich Derkach
- Date of birth: 14 November 1966 (age 59)
- Place of birth: Budapest, Hungary
- Height: 1.80 m (5 ft 11 in)
- Position: Midfielder

Youth career
- RSDYuSShOR Kishinyov

Senior career*
Years	Team	Apps	(Gls)
1984	Nistru Kishinyov	0	(0)
1985	Dinamo Brest	22	(3)
1986–1988	Dinamo Minsk	41	(7)
1989–1993	Dynamo Moscow	91	(10)
1993–1994	Basel	12	(0)
1994	Dynamo Moscow	5	(0)
1995–1996	Alania Vladikavkaz	38	(6)
1997–1998	Saturn Ramenskoye	18	(1)

Managerial career
- 2002–2003: Khimki
- * Club domestic league appearances and goals

Sergei Petrovich Derkach (Russian: Серге́й Петрович Деркач; born 14 November 1966) is a Russian professional football coach and a former player.

== Club career ==
Derkach joined Basel's first team for their Basel's 1993–94 season, under head-coach Claude Andrey. After playing in one test game, Derkach played his domestic league debut for his new club in the home game in the St. Jakob Stadium on 28 July 1993 Basel as were defeated 1–2 by local rivals Old Boys.

Derkach's teammates that season were the likes of Swiss international goalkeeper Stefan Huber, defenders Massimo Ceccaroni, Marco Walker and Samir Tabakovic, the midfielders Mario Cantaluppi, Martin Jeitziner, Admir Smajić and Ørjan Berg and the Swiss international strikers Dario Zuffi and Philippe Hertig. Together they won the promotion/relegation group and became Nationalliga B champions and thus won promotion to the top flight of Swiss football. This after six seasons in the second tier.

In his one season with the club Derkach played a total of 22 games for Basel scoring a total of two goals. 12 of these games were in the Nationalliga A, two in the Swiss Cup and eight were friendly games. He scored both goal during the test games.

He made his debut in the Soviet Top League in 1986 for FC Dinamo Minsk.

== Honours ==
- Russian Premier League champion: 1995.
- Russian Premier League runner-up: 1994, 1996.
- Russian Premier League bronze: 1992, 1993.
- Soviet Top League bronze: 1990.
- Soviet Cup finalist: 1987.

== European club competitions ==
- UEFA Cup 1986–87 with FC Dinamo Minsk: 2 games.
- European Cup Winners' Cup 1987–88 with FC Dinamo Minsk: 5 games, 1 goal.
- UEFA Cup 1988–89 with FC Dinamo Minsk: 4 games.
- UEFA Cup 1991–92 with FC Dynamo Moscow: 2 games.
- UEFA Cup 1992–93 with FC Dynamo Moscow: 5 games, 1 goal.
- UEFA Cup 1995–96 with FC Alania Vladikavkaz: 2 games.
- UEFA Cup 1996–97 with FC Alania Vladikavkaz: 1 game.

== Sources ==
- Die ersten 125 Jahre. Publisher: Josef Zindel im Friedrich Reinhardt Verlag, Basel. ISBN 978-3-7245-2305-5
