= Frank Wittmann =

German footballer

Personal information
- Date of birth: 29 January 1970 (age 56)
- Place of birth: Weil am Rhein, Germany
- Positions: Midfielder; forward

Youth career
- –1996: SV Weil
- 1996–1990: FC Basel

Senior career*
Years	Team	Apps	(Gls)
1990–1994	FC Basel	3	(1)
1990–1992	→ FC Baden (loan)	14	(2)
1994–1996	Old Boys		
1996–2000	FC Riehen		
2000–2003	Nordstern Basel		
2003	SV Muttenz		
2003–2004	Old Boys		
2006–2007	Nordstern Basel		
2007–2009	FC Liestal		
- * Club domestic league appearances and goals

Frank Wittmann (born 29 January 1970) is a German former professional footballer who played as midfielder or forward.

== Career ==
Born in Weil am Rhein, Wittmann played his youth football with local team SV Weil. At the age of 15 he was scouted by neighbouring FC Basel, who were eventually successful in signing the youth player.

Wittmann advanced to Basel's first team for their 1990–91 season under head-coach Ernst-August Künnecke. After playing in three test games Wittmann played his domestic league debut for his club in the Nationalliga B away game on 5 September 1990 as Basel played a goalless draw against FC Glarus. He scored his first goal for his club in the away game on 8 December. It was the first goal of the match as Basel drew 1–1 with Chur.

To obtain more playing time, Wittmann was loaned to FC Baden, with head-coach Raimondo Ponte, who also played in the second tier of Swiss football. During the second half of the 1991–92 season he broke into the team played as regular. With Baden he played a total of 14 league matches scoring two goals. These were scored in the away match on 25 April 1992, but the team could only manage a 2–2 draw with ES Malley. Following his time with Baden he returned to Basel but his match appearances were mainly in their reserve team.

During Basel's 1993–94 season, under head-coach Claude Andrey, his teammates were the likes of Swiss international goalkeeper Stefan Huber, defenders Massimo Ceccaroni, Marco Walker and Samir Tabakovic, the midfielders Mario Cantaluppi, Martin Jeitziner, Admir Smajić and Ørjan Berg and the Swiss international striker Dario Zuffi. Together they won the promotion/relegation group and as Nationalliga B champions thus won promotion to the top flight of Swiss football, after six seasons in the second tier. Between the years 1990 and 1994 Wittmann played a total of eight games for Basel's first team scoring that one aforementioned goal. Three of these games were in the Nationalliga A and the others were friendly games.

Following his time with Basel, Wittmann moved on to play for amateur club Old Boys. He continued with a remarkable continuation in the 1st and 2nd Inter leagues with clubs such as FC Riehen, FC Nordstern Basel or FC Liestal. During this time he was usually the club's top scorer, driver and undisputed leader on the pitch.

== Personal life ==
Wittmann was born in Weil am Rhein, on the German/Swiss boarder. He studied confectionery technology and became expert for GMP working for Jacobs Suchard in Weil. During his footballing time he moved residence from Germany to Switzerland. Then, after his footballing time he advanced to become head of production, working for Permamed AG a pharmaceutical company in Therwil, stating "If there is a Swiss cross on it, there is quality inside. I like that because of my personal attitude. When it comes to quality issues, the pharmaceutical industry does not tolerate half measures".

Since this interview he has changed his employer but is still active in this centre.

== Sources ==
- Rotblau: Jahrbuch Saison 2017/2018. Publisher: FC Basel Marketing AG. ISBN 978-3-7245-2189-1
- Die ersten 125 Jahre. Publisher: Josef Zindel im Friedrich Reinhardt Verlag, Basel. ISBN 978-3-7245-2305-5
- Verein "Basler Fussballarchiv" Homepage
