= Ralph Steingruber =

Swiss footballer (born 1967)

Personal information
- Full name: Ralph Steingruber
- Date of birth: 15 January 1967 (age 59)
- Place of birth: Switzerland
- Positions: Defender; midfielder

Youth career
- until 1991: BSC Old Boys

Senior career*
Years	Team	Apps	(Gls)
1991–1993	BSC Old Boys	60	(7)
1993–1995	FC Basel	43	(2)
1995–1996	FC St. Gallen	21	(1)
1996–1999	FC Wil 1900	86	(5)
1999–2001	FC Hinwil		
2001–2006	FC Breitenbach		
- * Club domestic league appearances and goals

Ralph Steingruber (born 15 January 1967) is a retired Swiss footballer who played as defender or midfielder in the 1990s and 2000s.

Steingruber played his youth football by BSC Old Boys and advanced to their first team in 1991. After playing two seasons with them he moved on.

Steingruber joined FC Basel for their 1993–94 season under head-coach Claude Andrey. After playing in five test games, Steingruber played his domestic league debut for his new club in the away game on 14 August 1993 as Basel won 3–0 against SR Delémont. Steingruber scored his first goal for his club one week later, on 19 August in the home game in the St. Jakob Stadium as Basel won 4–0 against Urania Genève Sport.

During this season his team mates were the likes of Swiss international goalkeeper Stefan Huber, defenders Massimo Ceccaroni, Marco Walker and Samir Tabakovic, the midfielders Mario Cantaluppi, Martin Jeitziner, Admir Smajić and Ørjan Berg and the Swiss international striker Dario Zuffi. Together they won the promotion/relegation group and as Nationalliga B champions thus won promotion to the top flight of Swiss football, after six seasons in the second tier. He stayed with the club for another season as they played in the 1994–95 Nationalliga A.

In his two seasons with the club, Steingruber played a total of 77 games for Basel scoring a total of seven goals. 43 of these games were in the Nationalliga A, eight in the Swiss Cup and 26 were friendly games. He scored two goals in the domestic league, one in the cup and the other four were scored during the test games.

After his time with Basel, Ralph Steingruber moved on to play one season for FC St. Gallen in top flight and then three seasons for Wil in the second tier of Swiss football. Steingruber then ended his professional football career and played two seasons as an amateur with FC Hinwil. He then returned to region Basel and ended his playing career after six seasons with FC Breitenbach.

== Sources ==
- Rotblau: Jahrbuch Saison 2017/2018. Publisher: FC Basel Marketing AG. ISBN 978-3-7245-2189-1
- Die ersten 125 Jahre. Publisher: Josef Zindel im Friedrich Reinhardt Verlag, Basel. ISBN 978-3-7245-2305-5
- Verein "Basler Fussballarchiv" Homepage
