= Andre Meier =

Swiss footballer (born 1965)

Personal information
- Full name: Andre Meier
- Date of birth: 3 March 1965 (age 61)
- Place of birth: Baden, Switzerland
- Height: 1.85 m (6 ft 1 in)
- Position: Midfielder

Senior career*
Years	Team	Apps	(Gls)
1984–1986	FC Baden	37	(0)
1986–1988	FC Schaffhausen	63	(0)
1988–1989	FC Aarau	31	(0)
1989–1992	FC Schaffhausen	101	(4)
1992–1993	FC Chiasso	33	(0)
1993–1996	FC Basel	83	(0)
1996–1997	FC Schaffhausen	35	(1)
1997–1998	FC Baden	33	(1)
1998–1999	SC Kriens	3	(0)
1999–	FC Fislisbach		
- * Club domestic league appearances and goals

Andre Meier (born 3 March 1965) is a Swiss former footballer who played as a midfielder during the 1980s and 1990s.

== Football career ==
Meier began his career with his local club FC Baden, joining their first team during their 1984–85 season and at the end of the season Meier won promotion with them. Meier played the 1985–86 Nationalliga A season with Baden, appearing in 27 of the 30 games, but at the end of the season they suffered relegation.

Meier signed a two-year contract with FC Schaffhausen during the summer of 1996 and played with them for two seasons. He then had a short spell at FC Aarau in the first tier of Swiss football, before he returned to Schaffhausen for another three seasons. In 1992 he moved to FC Chiasso, who were fighting against relegation from the Nationalliga A. However, they were unsuccessful in their attempt and so Meier moved on.

Meier joined FC Basel for their 1993–94 season under head-coach Claude Andrey. After playing in six test games Meier played his domestic league debut for the club in the home game in the St. Jakob Stadium on 28 July 1993 as Basel were defeated 1–2 by Old Boys. During this season his teammates were the likes of Swiss international goalkeeper Stefan Huber, defenders Massimo Ceccaroni, Marco Walker and Samir Tabakovic, the midfielders Mario Cantaluppi, Martin Jeitziner, Admir Smajić and Ørjan Berg and the Swiss international striker Dario Zuffi. Together they won the promotion/relegation group and as Nationalliga B champions thus won promotion to the top flight of Swiss football, after six seasons in the second tier.

After the promotion he stayed with the club for another two seasons and during this time Meier played a total of 138 games for Basel without scoring a goal. 83 of these games were in the Nationalliga B or Nationalliga A, 12 in the Swiss Cup, four in the UEFA Intertoto Cup and 39 were friendly games.

He returned for one season to FC Schaffhausen during the summer of 1996, played one more season with FC Baden and then moved onto SC Kriens for the 1998–1999. He played only three matches in the entire season, so retired from his professional career and moved on to play for FC Fislisbach at amateur level.

== Sources ==
- Rotblau: Jahrbuch Saison 2017/2018. Publisher: FC Basel Marketing AG. ISBN 978-3-7245-2189-1
- Die ersten 125 Jahre. Publisher: Josef Zindel im Friedrich Reinhardt Verlag, Basel. ISBN 978-3-7245-2305-5
- Verein "Basler Fussballarchiv" Homepage
