= Mario Uccella =

Italian footballer

Personal information
- Full name: Mario Uccella
- Date of birth: 18 February 1966 (age 60)
- Position: Defender

Senior career*
Years	Team	Apps	(Gls)
1986–1987	FC Brüttisellen		
1987–1989	FC Zürich	25	(1)
1989–1994	FC Winterthur	75	(6)
1992–1994	FC Basel	31	(1)
1994–1995	FC Riehen		
- * Club domestic league appearances and goals

Mario Uccella (born 18 February 1966) is a retired Italian-Swiss footballer who played in the 1980s and 1990s as a midfielder.

Uccella first played for FC Brüttisellen. He then signed his first profession contract and played for FC Zürich in the 1987–88 Nationalliga A season, but he and the team suffered relegation at the end of that season. Uccella stayed with the club, but they failed in their immediate promotion attempt. Because he was only getting occasional playing possibilities he decided to move on and transferred to FC Winterthur. Here he stayed, under contract, for three seasons.

Uccella joined FC Basel's first team for their 1992–93 season under head-coach Friedel Rausch. After playing in five test games Uccella played his domestic league debut for his new club in the opening match of the season, an away game on 18 July 1992 as Basel were defeated 0–1 by Grenchen. He scored his first goal for the club on 29 November in the away game in the La Blancherie and it was the winning goal as Basel won 1–0 against SR Delémont.

During Basel's 1993–94 season his teammates included Swiss international goalkeeper Stefan Huber, defenders Massimo Ceccaroni, Marco Walker and Samir Tabakovic, the midfielders Mario Cantaluppi, Martin Jeitziner, Admir Smajić and Ørjan Berg and the Swiss international striker Dario Zuffi. Together they won the promotion/relegation group and as Nationalliga B champions thus won promotion to the top flight of Swiss football, after six seasons in the second tier.

He stayed with the club for two seasons, playing 56 games and scoring two goals. 31 of these games were in the Nationalliga B, three were in the Swiss Cup and 22 were friendly games. He scored one goal in the domestic league; the other was scored during a test game.

Following his time with Basel, Uccella retired from his professional career and continued as an amateur with local team FC Riehen.

== Sources ==
- Rotblau: Jahrbuch Saison 2017/2018. Publisher: FC Basel Marketing AG. ISBN 978-3-7245-2189-1
- Die ersten 125 Jahre. Publisher: Josef Zindel im Friedrich Reinhardt Verlag, Basel. ISBN 978-3-7245-2305-5
- Verein "Basler Fussballarchiv" Homepage
