= Olivier Bauer =

Swiss footballer (born 1972)

Personal information
- Full name: Olivier Bauer
- Date of birth: 28 February 1972 (age 54)
- Place of birth: Switzerland
- Height: 1.85 m (6 ft 1 in)
- Position: Defender

Youth career
- until 1989: FC Aesch

Senior career*
Years	Team	Apps	(Gls)
1989–1990	FC Aesch		
1990–1994	FC Basel	65	(0)
1994–1995	BSC Old Boys		
- * Club domestic league appearances and goals

Olivier Bauer (born 28 February 1972) is a Swiss retired football defender who played in the early 1990s as defender.

Bauer played his youth football with local club FC Aesch. He advanced to their first team in the 1989–1990 season. Bauer then joined FC Basel's first team during the winter break of their 1990–91 season and signed his first professional contract under head-coach Ernst August Künnecke in the second tier of Swiss football. After playing in one test match, Bauer played his domestic league debut for his new club in the away game at the Espenmoos on 1 June 1991 as Basel were defeated 0–1 by St. Gallen.

Right from the beginning of the following season Bauer became a regular in the starting eleven. During Basel's 1993–94 season his team mates were the likes of Swiss international goalkeeper Stefan Huber, defenders Massimo Ceccaroni, Marco Walker and Samir Tabakovic, the midfielders Mario Cantaluppi, Martin Jeitziner, Admir Smajić and Ørjan Berg and the Swiss international striker Dario Zuffi. Together they won the promotion/relegation group and thus won promotion to the top flight of Swiss football, after six seasons in the second tier.

He was with the club for four seasons and during this time Bauer played a total of 95 games for Basel without scoring a goal. 65 of these games were in the Nationalliga A, seven in the Swiss Cup and 23 were friendly games.

In the winter break of the 1993–94 season Bauer left Basel moved on to play for local team BSC Old Boys.

== Sources ==
- Die ersten 125 Jahre. Publisher: Josef Zindel im Friedrich Reinhardt Verlag, Basel. ISBN 978-3-7245-2305-5
- Verein "Basler Fussballarchiv" Homepage
