= Vincenzo Palumbo =

German footballer (born 1974)

Personal information
- Date of birth: 17 May 1974 (age 52)
- Place of birth: Heilbronn, West Germany
- Height: 1.78 m (5 ft 10 in)
- Position: Striker

Youth career
- Biberach
- Heilbronn

Senior career*
Years	Team	Apps	(Gls)
1992–1993	Stuttgarter Kickers	22	(2)
1993	FC Schaffhausen		
1993–1994	FC Basel	7	(0)
1994	TuS Paderborn-Neuhaus	2	(0)
1994–1995	Servette	0	(0)
1995	Chênois	22	(11)
1995–1998	Andria BAT	43	(12)
1998	Empoli	3	(0)
1998–2001	Delfino Pescara	40	(12)
2001–2003	Palermo	9	(1)
2003–2006	Torres Calcio	51	(9)
2006–2007	Pisa	26	(1)
2007–2009	Olbia Calcio	53	(25)
2009	Virtus Casarano	0	(0)
2009–2010	Tavolara	15	(6)
2010–2011	U.S. Viterbese 1908	24	(5)
2011	Tavolara		
2012	Olbia Calcio		
2012–2013	Nuorese Calcio	20	(16)
2013	U.S.D. Castelsardo		
2013–2014	F.B.C. Calangianus 1905		
- * Club domestic league appearances and goals

Vincenzo Palumbo (born 17 May 1974) is a German former professional footballer who played as a striker. Over the course of his career, he has played mostly in Italy but also spent time with clubs in Germany and Switzerland.

== Career ==
Palumbo was born in Heilbronn. He signed his first professional contract with Stuttgarter Kickers for the 1992–93 season. At the end of the season he signed for Swiss team FC Schaffhausen but this did not work out so he moved on.

Palumbo then joined FC Basel for their 1993–94 season under head-coach Claude Andrey. After playing in five test games Palumbu played his domestic league debut for the club in the home game in the St. Jakob Stadium on 21 August 1993 as Basel won 3–1 against Fribourg. During this season his team mates were the likes of Swiss international goalkeeper Stefan Huber, defenders Massimo Ceccaroni, Marco Walker and Samir Tabakovic, the midfielders Mario Cantaluppi, Martin Jeitziner, Admir Smajić and Ørjan Berg and the Swiss international striker Dario Zuffi. Together they won the promotion/relegation group and as Nationalliga B champions thus won promotion to the top flight of Swiss football, after six seasons in the second tier.

In his six months with the club Palumbo played a total of 14 games for Basel scoring two goals. Seven of these games were in the Nationalliga B, one in the Swiss Cup and six were friendly games. Both goal were scored during the test games.

Palumbo left Basel after the winter break of that season and moved on to play the rest of the season for german team TuS Paderborn-Neuhaus. For the 1994–95 season he signed for Servette FC, but did not become any playing time, so in the winter break he moved on to Chênois. Here he played a successful second half of the season. At the beginning of the 1995–96 season Palumbo moved to Italy and signed for Andria BAT and here he stayed for two and a half seasons. In January he signed for Empoli.

Palumbo's further stations in Italy include Delfino Pescara, Palermo, Torres Calcio, Pisa, Olbia Calcio, Virtus Casarano, Tavolara, U.S. Viterbese 1908, Nuorese Calcio, U.S.D. Castelsardo and finally F.B.C. Calangianus 1905.

== Sources ==
- Die ersten 125 Jahre. Publisher: Josef Zindel im Friedrich Reinhardt Verlag, Basel. ISBN 978-3-7245-2305-5
- Verein "Basler Fussballarchiv" Homepage
