= Thomas Karrer =

Swiss footballer (born 1972)

Personal information
- Date of birth: 20 July 1972 (age 54)
- Position: Defender

Youth career
- until 1990: FC Basel

Senior career*
Years	Team	Apps	(Gls)
1990–1994	FC Basel	28	(1)
1995–1996	FC Grenchen		
1999–2001	SV Muttenz		
2001–2006	FC Breitenbach		
- * Club domestic league appearances and goals

Thomas Karrer (born 20 July 1972) is a retired Swiss football defender who played in the 1990s and early 2000s.

== Football career ==
Karrer played his youth football by FC Basel and advanced to their first team during their 1990–91 season under head-coach Ernst-August Künnecke. Karrer played his domestic league debut for the club in the home game in the St. Jakob Stadium on 8 June 1991. He scored his first goal for the team in that very same game. It was the second goal of the game as Basel won 3–0 against Yverdon-Sports.

In 1992 he signed his first professional contract under head-coach Friedel Rausch. During Basel's 1993–94 season his teammates were the likes of Swiss international goalkeeper Stefan Huber, defenders Massimo Ceccaroni, Marco Walker and Samir Tabakovic, the midfielders Mario Cantaluppi, Martin Jeitziner, Admir Smajić and Ørjan Berg and the Swiss international striker Dario Zuffi. Together they won the promotion/relegation phase and thus won promotion to the top flight of Swiss football, after six seasons in the second tier. In that season in the Swiss Cup match on 4 September 1993 Karrer scored two goals as Basel won 10–0 against lower tier SC Zug.

Karrer stayed with the club for four and a half seasons, but never really broke into the first team, sometimes playing for the reserve team. During the winter break of the season following their promotion, Karrer left the club. In his time with the club, between the years 1990 and 1994, Karrer played a total of 64 games for Basel scoring a total of three goals. 28 of these games were in the Nationalliga A or in the Nationalliga B, seven in the Swiss Cup and 29 were friendly games. He scored that one afore mentioned goal in the domestic league and the other two in the afore named cup game.

In January 1995 Karrer moved to FC Grenchen. At the end of that season Grenchen had their licenses revoked and were force relegated, Karrer ended his professional career and stayed with the club as amateur and played in the 1st League. In 1999 Karrer joined SV Muttenz for two seasons and then ended in playing career with local club FC Breitenbach.

== Personal life ==
During 1995 Karrer returned to the region Basel and worked in the personnel services sector. Of himself, he says, he has over 20 years experience in HR including more than 14 years as an entrepreneur, partner and business and board member. His focus is on the support and the placement of contractors, freelancers and expats. He has in-depth knowledge of the job market in the pharmaceutical, finance, office, logistics, industrial and medical sectors in the economic area of northwestern Switzerland. He is managing director of a firm working in these sectors.

== Sources ==
- Die ersten 125 Jahre. Publisher: Josef Zindel im Friedrich Reinhardt Verlag, Basel. ISBN 978-3-7245-2305-5
- Verein "Basler Fussballarchiv" Homepage
