= 1993–94 FC Basel season =

FC Basel
1993–94 season
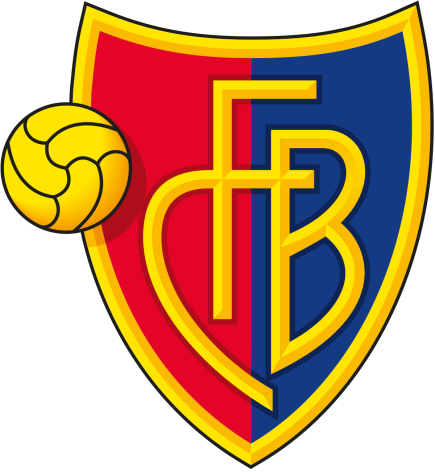
- Chairman: Peter Epting
- Manager: Claude Andrey
- Ground: St. Jakob Stadium, Basel
- Nationalliga B: Qualifying 2nd of 10
- Promotion/relegation NLA/NLB: 1st of 8
- Swiss Cup: Semifinal
- Top goalscorer: League: Dario Zuffi (22); All: Dario Zuffi (27)
- Highest home attendance: 42,126 on 30 April 1994 vs FC Zürich
- Lowest home attendance: 4,800 on 19 August 1993 vs Urania Genève Sport
- Average home league attendance: 11,270

The Fussball Club Basel 1893 1993–94 season was their 101st season since the club's foundation. Peter Epting was the club's chairman he had taken over in this position at the club's AGM in March. FC Basel played their home games in the St. Jakob Stadium. Following their relegation in the 1987–88 season this was their sixth season in the second tier of Swiss football.

== Overview ==
=== Pre-season ===
Claude Andrey was appointed as new first team head-coach. He came from Sion where he had been trainer for the previous six months and he came as replacement for Friedel Rausch who had only been trainer with the club for the previous season.

A number of players left the club during the off-season. Last season's top scorer André Sitek moved on to score his goals for Locarno, another goal scorer Frédéric Chassot returned to Neuchâtel Xamax after his loan period had expired and defender Dirk Lellek transferred to VfB Oldenburg. Christian Marcolli and Manfred Wagner both moved on to local rivals to Old Boys and Patrick Rahmen moved on to play for SR Delémont. In the other direction Swiss international goalkeeper Stefan Huber transferred in from Lausanne-Sport. Two new defender were also transferred in, Andre Meier from Chiasso and Samir Tabakovic from NK Belišće. The midfield was stregthend with the signings of Mario Cantaluppi from Grasshopper Club, Sergei Derkach from Dynamo Moscow and Didier Gigon from Lausanne-Sport. More notable transfers were those of Swiss international strikers Dario Zuffi and Philippe Hertig who both came from Lugano. A number of youngsters were brought up from the youth team including the hopeful local lads Markus Lichtsteiner and Roger Schreiber.

=== Domestic league ===
After missing promotion during the last five seasons, the club's repeated priority aim was to return to the top flight of Swiss football. There was to be a further reform in the Swiss football league system and the number of teams in the Nationliga B to be reduced from 20 to 16. The 20 teams in the Nationalliga B were divided into two groups of 10, an East and a West group. In the first stage, both groups would play a qualification round. In the second stage, the top two teams in each Nationalliga B group would advance to the promotion round and the bottom eight teams in each group would play a relegation round. In the second stage the tops two teams of each group and the last four teams of the Nationalliga A would play a promotion/relegation round. The top four teams in this groups would play in the top flight the next season, the other four in the second flight. In the relegation round the remaining teams were divided into two groups of eight. In total seven teams would be relegated to the 1st League, the last three teams from each group plus one of both fifth placed teams.

Basel were assigned to the Nationalliga B West group, together with local rivals Old Boys and SR Delémont. Basel started somewhat sloppily into the season with two home defeats against Old Boys and Grenchen in the first three games of the season. But the newly formed team soon found themselves and they recorded eight victories in the next nine games. Etoile Carouge ended the qualifying phase as group winners, two points above second placed Basel. In the 18 games, Basel recorded 12 victories, one draw and five defeats with a goal difference of plus 25, 39 scored and 14 conceded. Dario Zuffi with 11 goals, Ørjan Berg with eight and Admir Smajić with six goals were the team's top goal scorers. Stefan Huber held a clean sheet in nine of his 17 matches during this first stage of the season.

As second placed team in their qualifying group, Basel qualified for the promotion stage. To help with their promotion attempt Axel Kruse was signed in on loan from VfB Stuttgart until the end of the season, but because of injuries he only played three league games. The other teams in this stage from the Nationalliga B were Etoile Carouge, St. Gallen and Schaffhausen. The bottom four teams from the Nationalliga A were Xamax, Zürich, Kriens and Yverdon-Sports. Basel's start in the phase of a somewhat slow stance and three draws in the first four matches and despite an away defeat against Xamax in round six they played well at the top of the group table. Not being defeated in the last eight matches, winning five, drawing three, they ended the group in first place. They were level on points with St. Gallen and Xamax and won promotion. Relegated this season from the top flight were Kriens and Yverdon-Sports. The team's top goal scorer was Dario Zuffi with 11 goals, five other players each scored two goals. Stefan Huber held a clean sheet in seven of his 13 matches during the second stage of the season.

=== Swiss Cup ===
Basel entered the Swiss Cup in the second round. Here they were drawn away from home in the Herti Allmend Stadion against lower-tier team Zug. Thomas Karrer and Ralph Steingruber put the guests 2–0 in front by half time and then in the second half they added even more pressure. In the second half they added another eight goals to final result 10–0. In the third round Basel were drawn at home in the St. Jakob Stadium against higher tier Aarau and despite being a goal down through an own goal at half time, Basel again turned up the pressure again in the second half and turned the result to win 4–1. In round four another higher tier team were to visit Basel in their home stadium. Dario Zuffi and Admir Smajić scored the goals as they won 2–0 against Lausanne-Sport. Round five gave higher tier Xamax the journey to St. Jakob Stadium and another Zuffi goal gave the host team a 1–0 victory. The fourth higher top flight team to make the visit to the stadium was Yverdon-Sports. The match was goalless after 90 minutes, thus went into over-time. Zuffi gave the hosts a 1–0 victory after extra time with a goal in 118th minute.

The semi-final also gave Basel a home game against Schaffhausen, who had suffered a 3–0 defeat here exactly two weeks earlier. But this time the hosts played under capabilities, Schaffhausen played compact and kept the game goalless, even after extra time. The penalty shoot out was decisive. Schaffhausen goalkeeper Erich Hürzeler held striker Zuffi's attempt, Basel keeper Huber held Engesser's attempt and after 12 penalties things were level at five all. Keeper Hürzeler then held Tabakovic's attempt and so Steffen Ziffert's final penalty gave Schaffhausen the upset. Penalty sinner Tabakovic, the central defender from Bosnia, shed bitter tears. Schaffhausen advanced to the Swiss Cup final for only the second time in the club's history. Here they played Grasshopper Club, but the higher tier team proved their strength winning 4–0. It was GC's 18th Cup victory in their history.

== Players ==
Note: Flags indicate national team as defined under FIFA eligibility rules; some limited exceptions apply. Players may hold more than one non-FIFA nationality.

No.	Pos.	Nation	Player
—	GK	SUI	Thomas Grüter
—	GK	SUI	Stefan Huber (from Lausanne-Sport)
—	DF	SUI	Olivier Bauer
—	DF	SUI	Reto Baumgartner
—	DF	SUI	Massimo Ceccaroni
—	DF	SUI	Thomas Karrer
—	DF	SUI	Marc Küpfer (from youth team)
—	DF	SUI	Markus Lichtsteiner (from youth team)
—	DF	SUI	Andre Meier (from Chiasso)
—	DF	SUI	Micha Rahmen
—	DF	BIH	Samir Tabakovic (from NK Belišće)
—	DF	ITA	Mario Uccella
—	DF	SUI	Marco Walker
—	MF	NOR	Ørjan Berg

No.	Pos.	Nation	Player
—	MF	SUI	Mario Cantaluppi (from Grasshopper Club)
—	MF	HUN	Sergei Derkach (from Dynamo Moscow)
—	MF	SUI	Didier Gigon (from Lausanne-Sport)
—	MF	SUI	Martin Jeitziner
—	FW	GER	Axel Kruse (on loan from VfB Stuttgart Jan/Jun 94)
—	MF	SUI	Pierre-André Schürmann (to Wil Feb 1994)
—	MF	BIH	Admir Smajić
—	MF	SUI	Ralph Steingruber (from Old Boys)
—	FW	SUI	Philippe Hertig (from Lugano)
—	FW	GER	Vincenzo Palumbo (from Stuttgarter Kickers)
—	FW	SUI	Roger Schreiber (from youth team)
—	MF	GER	Frank Wittmann (from reserves)
—	FW	SUI	Dario Zuffi (from Lugano)
—		SUI	Cedric Jakob

Players who left the squad

Note: Flags indicate national team as defined under FIFA eligibility rules; some limited exceptions apply. Players may hold more than one non-FIFA nationality.

No.	Pos.	Nation	Player
—	GK	SUI	Christian Reinwald (retired)
—	DF	GER	Dirk Lellek (to VfB Oldenburg)
—	MF	SUI	Adrian Jenzer
—	MF	SUI	Christian Marcolli (to Old Boys)
—	MF	SUI	Andreas Steiner (reserves)
—	MF	GER	Manfred Wagner (to Old Boys)

No.	Pos.	Nation	Player
—	FW	SUI	Frédéric Chassot (returned to Neuchâtel Xamax)
—	FW	ITA	Gaetano Giallanza (to Servette)
—	FW	SUI	Patrick Rahmen (to SR Delémont)
—	FW	NED	André Sitek (to Locarno)
—	FW	SUI	Ruedi Zbinden (to Bellinzona)
—		SUI	Pasquale D'Ambrosio (reserves)
—		SUI	Mathias Walther (reserves)

== Results ==
Legend

Win Draw Loss Postponed

=== Friendly matches ===
==== Pre- and mid-season ====
7 July 1993 Uhrencup semi-final	Grenchen (Switzerland)	1–2	(Switzerland) Basel	Stadion Brühl, Grenchen
19:00	Boruwko 51' (1:1)	FCB summary	18' (0:1) Zuffi; 57' (1:2) Smajić	Attendance: 1,200; Referee: (Switzerland) Jürg Herrmann (Hinterkapplen (Wohlen bei Bern))
Note: The Uhrencup is a former club football tournament that was held annually in Grenchen in Switzerland. Grenchen played without Wenger, Dysli (both injured) and Aebi (ill). FC Basel were without Baumgartner, Rahmen, Schürmann (all injured) and Hertig (slightly injured). A fair game, no cautions.

10 July 1993 Uhrencup final	Basel (Switzerland)	4–5	(Switzerland) Zürich	Stadion Brühl, Grenchen
19:00	Karrer (yellow card) 7'; Hertig 12' (1:1); Berg 22' (2:1); Smajić 72' (pen. 3:2); Palumbo 86' (4:5)	FCB summary FCZ summary	2' (0:1) Blättler; (yellow card) 16' Şahin; 28' (pen.2:2) Blättler; 76' (o.g. 3:3) (Meier); 79' (3:4) Blättler; 82' (3:5) Studer	Attendance: 1,250; Referee: (Switzerland) Kurt Zuppinger (Bremgarten, Aargau)
Note: The Uhrencup is a former club football tournament that was held annually in Grenchen in Switzerland. Basel without Zuffi, Bauer (both injured), Baumgartner (recovering), and Schürmann (hairline fracture in his calf). Zurich without Baldassari, Baljic, Grassi, Hotz, Kägi, and Tzionas (all injured).

11 July 1993 Pre-season	Basel (Switzerland)	2–6	(Germany) VfB Stuttgart	Wolfstiege, Gelterkinden
17:00	M. Rahmen 25' (1:1); Smajić 61' (pen. 2:5)	FCB summary	9' (0:1) Kruse; 30' (1:2) Sverisson; 50' (1:3) Walter; 56' (1:4) Knup; 58' (1:5) Walter; 89' (2:6) Strunz	Attendance: 2,700; Referee: (Switzerland) Walter Rudin (Birsfelden)
Note: Basel without Schürmann, Baumgartner (injured). Stuttgart without Schäfer, Dubajic (injured). Fair game, no cautions. The game was interrupted after three minutes for a quarter of an hour due to a heavy rain shower.

14 July 1993 Sepione Cup semi-final	Aarau (Switzerland)	3–3 (4–5 p)	(Switzerland) Basel	Moos, Balsthal
19:30	Aleksandrov 60' (1:3); Aleksandrov 62' (2:3); Komornicki 89' (pen. 3:3)	FCB summary	15' (0:1) Zuffi; 39' (0:2) Zuffi; 42' (0:3) Zuffi	Attendance: 1,800; Referee: (Switzerland) Francis Fischer (Arch)
	Penalties
	Hermann (penalty scored); Komornicki (penalty scored); Pavličević (penalty missed); Weiler (penalty scored); Romano (penalty scored); Marini (penalty missed)		(penalty scored) Zuffi; (penalty missed) Smajić; (penalty scored) Berg; (penalty scored) Jeitziner; (penalty scored) Meier; (penalty scored) Steingruber
Note: The Sempione Cup was a club tournament played in summer at Sportanlage Moos, Balsthal, during the years 1987 to 2004. Aarau without Bader, Rupf, Kilian. Basel without Schürmann, Baumgartner (all injured).

17 July 1993 Sepione Cup final	Basel (Switzerland)	1–0	(England) Everton	Moos, Balsthal
17:30	Zuffi 27' (1:0); Zuffi (penalty missed) 59′	FCB summary	(yellow card) 61' Rodosavlevic; (yellow card) 88' Ablett	Attendance: 2,500; Referee: (Switzerland) Dieter Schoch (Attiswil)
Note: The Sempione Cup was a club tournament played in summer at Sportanlage Moos, Balsthal, during the years 1987 to 2004. FCB without Baumgartner and Schürmann (both recovering from injury). 59th minute, Everton goalkeeper Neville Southall saved Zuffi's penalty.

20 July 1993 Pre-season	FC Sursee (Switzerland)	0–6	(Switzerland) Basel	Chrüzmatt, Dagmersellen
19:00		FCB summary	4' (0:1) Zuffi; 20' (0:2) Hertig; 66' (0:3) Hertig; 77' (0:4) Zuffi; 81' (0:5) Palumbo; 89' (0:6) Walker	Attendance: 500; Referee: (Switzerland) Erwin Fölmli
Note: FC Sursee without goalkeeper Pfrunder. FC Basel without the injured Ceccaroni and Uccella.

10 August 1993 Mid-season	Basel (Switzerland)	1–3	(Germany) Borussia Dortmund	St. Jakob Stadium, Basel
19:30	Cantaluppi 88' (1:3)	FCB summary	45' (0:1) Sippel; 71' (0:2) Zorc; 85' (0:3) Yahaya	Attendance: 14,000; Referee: (Switzerland) Serge Muhmenthaler (Grenchen)
Note: Both sides were without various key players: for FCB, in addition to the already injured, there was the slightly injured Zuffi and the slightly ill Smajic; for Dortmund, Rummenigge (not in the squad) and Chapuisat (with the national team in Sweden).

12 October 1993 Mid-season	Basel (Switzerland)	1–1	(Switzerland) Grasshopper Club	St. Jakob Stadium, Basel
19:00	Zuffi 57' (1:1)	FCB summary	41' (0:1) Willems	Attendance: 1,037; Referee: (Switzerland) Kurt Röthlisberger (Suhr)
Note: Basel without Meier, Baumgartner, Derkach, Smajic, Uccella, Hertig. GC without Gren, Vega, Gämperle.

==== Winter break ====
15 January 1994 Winter break	Basel (Switzerland)	3–1	(Switzerland) Aarau	St. Jakob Stadium, Basel
14:30	Cantaluppi 32' (1:0); Berg 43' (2:1); Derkach 46' (3:1)	FCB summary	34' (1:1) Komornicki	Attendance: 1,500; Referee: (Switzerland) Serge Muhmenthaler (Grenchen)
Note: FCB without the slightly injured Ceccaroni, FCA without Hilfiker, Heldmann, Pavlicevic (resting) and Renggli (injured).

20 January 1994 Winter break	Basel (Switzerland)	1–4	(Switzerland) Luzern	Athletics stadium, Basel
18:30	Camenzind 43' (o.g. 1:2)	FCB summary	4' (0:1) Gerstenmájer; 21' (0:2) Wolf; 82' (1:3) Güntensperger; 86' (1:4) Burri	Attendance: 500; Referee: (Switzerland) Kurt Röthlisberger (Suhr, Aargau)
Note: FCB without Smajic and Ceccaroni. FCL without Rueda and Tuce. FCL made no substitutions.

25 January 1994 Winter break	Basel (Switzerland)	3–0	(Switzerland) Old Boys	Athletics stadium, Basel
18:30	Smajić 16' (1:0); Zuffi 21' (2:0); Derkach 75' (3:0)	FCB summary		Attendance: 400; Referee: (Switzerland) Michel Zen Ruffinen
Note: OB without Wagner and Hauck (injured) and without Riva, who had to end his career with immediate effect due to hip problems.

28 January 1994 Winter break	Chiasso (Switzerland)	0–2	(Switzerland) Basel	Stadio Comunale Riva IV, Chiasso
18:30		FCB summary	45' (0:1) Hertig; 67' (0:2) Hertig	Attendance: 70; Referee: (Switzerland) Carlo Bertolini (Vira-Gambarogno)
Note: FCB without Zuffi (still injured), Walker and Huber were the only squad players not used.

30 January 1994 Winter break	Lugano (Switzerland)	1–2	(Switzerland) Basel	Cornaredo, Lugano
14:30	Tabakovic 5' (o.g. 1:1)	FCB summary	2' (0:1) Smajić; 86' (1:2) Steingruber	Attendance: 300; Referee: (Switzerland) Francesco Bianchi (Chiasso)
Note: Lugano without Subiat and Englund, FCB without Zuffi (all injured). FCB with test player Samir Tabakovic

5 February 1994 Winter break	Basel (Switzerland)	1–2	(Germany) 1. FC Kaiserslautern	St. Jakob Stadium, Basel
17:30	Hertig 45' (1:0); Uccella (yellow card) 62'	FCB summary	72' (1:1) Ritter; 90+1' (1:2) Wagner	Attendance: 6,300; Referee: (Switzerland) Marti
Note: Pierre-André Schürmann, who is transferring to FC Wil, was given a farewell with flowers. Kaiserslautern played without the injured Eriksson.

27 May 1994 Mid-season	Basel (Switzerland)	1–2	Switzerland	St. Jakob Stadium, Basel
20:15	Cantaluppi 34' (1:2)	FCB summary	3' (pen. 0:1) Grassi; 32' (0:2) Grassi; (yellow card) 42' Studer	Attendance: 13,100; Referee: (Switzerland) Francesco Bianchi (Chiasso)
Note: FCB without the injured Smajic, Meier, Tabakovic, Ceccaroni, Karrer and without Hertig (family reasons). Swiss B selection, the A selection played against Liechtenstein earlier that evening.

=== Nationalliga B ===
The qualification of the NLB began on 28 July 1993 and was completed on 21 November. The top two teams in each group were qualified for the promotion/relegation group. The bottom eight teams in each group then played in newly drawn groups against relegation.

==== Qualification phase ====
28 July 1993 Round 1	Basel	1–2	Old Boys	St. Jakob Stadium, Basel
20:00	Zuffi 2' (1:0); Meier (yellow card) 65'	FCB summary	26' (1:1) Hofer; 37' (1:2) Hauck; (yellow card) 54' Ugazio; (yellow card) 59' Kohler	Attendance: 8,500; Referee: (Switzerland) Gottfried Friedrich (Seedorf, Uri)
Note: FCB without Uccella, Baumgartner, Rahmen, Schürmann, Palumbo (injured). OB without Koller (injured).

31 July 1993 Round 2	Bulle	0–3	Basel	Stade de Bouleyres, Bulle
20:00	Duc (yellow card) 7'; Fillistorf (yellow card) 43'	FCB summary	(yellow card) 51' Bauer; (penalty missed) 59′ Smajić; 80' (0:1) Hertig; 87' (0:2) Zuffi; 90' (0:3) Smajić	Attendance: 1,200; Referee: (Switzerland) Francis Fischer (Arch)
Note: Bulle without Thomann and Salad (not in the squad). FC Basel without the injured Schürmann, Uccella, Rahmen, Baumgartner and Palumbo. 59th minute, Bulle goalkeeper Betrand Fillistorf held Smajic's penalty.

7 August 1993 Round 3	Basel	0–1	Grenchen	St. Jakob Stadium, Basel
20:00		FCB summary	(yellow card) 8' Gunia; 38' (0:1) Maiano; (yellow card) 60' Menanga; (yellow card) 61' Schembrl	Attendance: 6,200; Referee: (Switzerland) Kurt Zuppinger (Bremgarten, Aargau)
Note: FCB were without the injured Baumgartner, Derkach, Karrer, Uccella, Palumbo, Schürmann, and Uccella; Grenchen were without the injured Chételat, Wenger, and Fuhrimann. The refereeing performance was absolutely inadequate.

14 August 1993 Round 4	SR Delémont	0–3	Basel	La Blancherie, Delémont
20:00	Moulin (yellow card) 29'	FCB summary	14' (0:1) Berg; (yellow card) 21' Walker; 62' (0:2) Zuffi; 69' (0:3) Cantaluppi	Attendance: 4,200; Referee: (Switzerland) Karl Strässle (Steinach)
Note: Delémont without the injured Crevoisier, Lovis, Platz and Réginelli; FCB without the injured Baumgartner, Derkach, Hertig, Karrer, Palumbo, Mischa Rahmen, Schürmann and Uccella.

19 August 1993 Round 5	Basel	4–0	Urania Genève Sport	St. Jakob Stadium, Basel
20:00	Zuffi 9' (1:0); Steingruber 37' (2:0); Berg 76' (3:0); Smajić 85' (4:0)	FCB summary	(yellow card) 22' Bula	Attendance: 4,800; Referee: (Switzerland) Fabrice Kaltenrieder
Note: FCB were without the injured Baumgartner, Uccella, Rahmen, Karrer, Derkach, Hertig, Schürmann, and Ceccaroni. Schreiber had to leave the field with a foot injury just over five minutes after coming on as a substitute and he underwent surgery the following day. Urania were without Pavoni, Brasier, and Rumer (all injured). National League Debut for FCB youth player Markus Lichtsteiner

21 August 1993 Round 6	Basel	3–1	Fribourg	St. Jakob Stadium, Basel
20:00	Cantaluppi 13' (1:1); Lichtsteiner 28' (2:1); Zuffi (yellow card) 55'; Smajić 61' (3:1); Smajić (yellow card) 65'	FCB summary	7' (0:1) Python; (yellow card) 31' Boutquenoud; (yellow card) 61' Gaspoz; (yellow card) 60' Piller	Attendance: 6,100; Referee: (Liechtenstein) Roland Beck (Triesenberg)
Note: FCB without Ceccaroni, Uccella, Baumgartner, Hertig, Schürmann, Rahmen, Karrer and Derkach (all injured). Fribourg without Meuwly and Perriard (injured).

25 August 1993 Round 7	Monthey	2–0	Basel	Stade Philippe Pottier, Monthey
20:00	Matthey 19' (1:0); Ogay (yellow card) 39'; Matthey 67' (2:0); Demerch (yellow card) 73'; Burchel (yellow card) 86'; Puce (yellow card) 90+1'	FCB summary	(yellow card) 75' Jakob	Attendance: 1,950; Referee: (Switzerland) Marcel Vollenweider (Rüti, Zürich)
Note: Monthey without their suspended libero Wiese and without the injured Lorenz and Tejeda. FCB without the injured Ceccaroni, Walker, Uccella, Baumgartner, Hertig, Schürmann, Rahmen, Karrer and Derkach.

28 August 1993 Round 8	Basel	2–0	Chênois	St. Jakob Stadium, Basel
20:00	Walker 42' (1:0); Berg 62' (2:0); Zuffi (yellow card) 70'	FCB summary	(yellow card) 44' Mattioli; (yellow card) 75' Hadjami; (yellow card) 90+1' Perroud	Attendance: 5,000; Referee: (Switzerland) Erwin Fölmli
Note: FCB ohne die verletzten Schürmann, Derkach, Baumgartner, Uccella, Rahmen und noch ohne den rekonvaleszenten Karrer. Chênois ohne die verletzten Alberton, Dusonchet, Tarare, Baumann.

1 September 1993 Round 9	Etoile Carouge	1–3	Basel	Stade de la Fontenette, Carouge
20:00	Langers 1' (1:0); Bel Bahi (yellow card) 33'	FCB summary	5' (1:1) Smajić; 65' (1:2) Zuffi; 75' (1:3) Berg	Attendance: 2,200; Referee: (Switzerland) René Kellenberger (Herisau)
Note: Carouge without Gumy. FCB without Derkach, Baumgartner, Schürmann, Hertig, Uccella, Rahmen (all injured). 19th minute, goal from Zuffi disallowed for a foul, 21st minute, goal from Favre disallowed due to an offside.

11 September 1993 Round 10	Old Boys	1–6	Basel	Stadion Schützenmatte, Basel
17:30	Kohler (yellow card) 12'; Caluwaerts (yellow card) 48'; Saibene (yellow card) 53'; Saibene 81' (1:5)	FCB summary	45' (0:1) Ceccaroni; 45+2' (o.g. 0:2) (Kohler); 50' (0:3) Zuffi; 52' (0:4) Berg; 55' (0:5); 91' (1:6) Zuffi	Attendance: 6,000; Referee: (Switzerland) Michel Zen Ruffinen
Note: OB without Ugazio. FCB without Derkach, Baumgartner, Schürmann, Uccella and Hertig (all injured).

25 September 1993 Round 11	Basel	5–0	Bulle	St. Jakob Stadium, Basel
20:00	Smajić 15' (1:0); Zuffi 26' (2:0); Berg 45' (3:0); Meier (yellow card) 56'; Zuffi 75' (4:0); Cantaluppi (yellow card) 76'; Walker (yellow card) 77'; Smajić 89' (5:0)	FCB summary	(yellow card) 1' Salad; (yellow card) 81' Favre	Attendance: 7,800; Referee: (Switzerland) Reto Tollot
Note: Basel without Derkach, Uccella, Bauer, Baumgartner, FC Bulle without Bwalya and Duc (all injured).

2 October 1993 Round 12	Grenchen	0–1	Basel	Stadion Brühl, Grenchen
17:30	Christ (yellow card) 68' (yellow-red card) 87'; Schembri (yellow card) 58'; Dysli (yellow card) 68'	FCB summary	27' (0:1) Hertig	Attendance: 2,800; Referee: (Switzerland) Erwin Fölmli
Note: Grenchen without Lanz, Aebi (suspended), Maiano, and Wenger (injured). Basel without Bauer, Baumgartner, Derkach, Karrer, Smajic, and Uccella (all injured).

6 October 1993 Round 13	Basel	1–2	SR Delémont	St. Jakob Stadium, Basel
20:00	Ceccaroni (yellow card) 16'; Meier (yellow card) 44'; Smajić (yellow card) 54'; Berg 58' (1:1)	FCB summary	(yellow card) 13' Varga; (yellow card) 32' Vukic; 47' (pen. 0:1) Vukic; (yellow card) 52' Mouli; (yellow card) 63' Léchenne; 75' (1:2) Varga	Attendance: 7,200; Referee: (Switzerland) Walter Nussbaumer (Crans-près-Céligny)
Note: FCB without Derkach, Uccella, Karrer, and Baumgartner (injured). Delémont without Lovis and Reginelli (injured).

16 October 1993 Round 14	Urania Genève Sport	0–3	Basel	Stade de Frontenex, Geneva
17:30	Reumer (yellow card) 32'	FCB summary	37' (0:1) Zuffi; 51' (0:2) Jeitziner; 70' (0:3) Zuffi	Attendance: 500; Referee: (Switzerland) Stefan Kohli
Note: Urania without Geiger, Marchand, Munoz (injured) and Rossello (military); Basel without Baumgartner, Derkach, Uccella, Bauer, Hertig and Karrer (all injured).

22 October 1993 Round 15	Fribourg	0–1	Basel	Stade Universitaire, Freiburg
20:00	Desclou (yellow card) 58'	FCB summary	31' (0:1) Cantaluppi; (yellow card) 90+2' Walker	Attendance: 1,000; Referee: (Switzerland) Karl Strässle (Steinach)
Note: Fribourg were without Meuwly and Piller (suspended). FCB were without Baumgartner, Hertig, Uccella, and Karrer (injured).

30 October 1993 Round 16	Basel	3–1	Monthey	St. Jakob Stadium, Basel
20:00	Walker 20' (1:1); Walker (yellow card) 52' (yellow-red card) 72'; Berg 63' (2:1); Ceccaroni 86' (3:1)	FCB summary	(yellow card) 13' Derivaz; 18' (0:1) Simunek; (yellow card) 24' Tejeda; (yellow card) 43' Lamas	Attendance: 3,822; Referee: (Switzerland) Gilles Golay
Note: FCB without Uccella, Baumgartner, and Karrer, while Monthey were without goalkeeper Tomare, Wiese and Lorenz.

14 November 1993 Round 17	Chênois	3–0	Basel	Stade des Trois-Chêne, Thônex
14:30	Ursea 20' (1:0); Popoviciu 44' (2:0); Hadjami 53' (3:0); Mattioli (yellow card) 74'	FCB summary	(yellow card) 28' Walker	Attendance: 1,000; Referee: (Switzerland) Ruppen
Note: Chênois without Gissi (suspended for three games after receiving a red card in the cup against FC Sion), Dusonchet (abroad) and Alberton; Basel without Karrer, Baumgartner, Uccella and Smajic (all injured).

21 November 1993 Round 18	Basel	0–0	Etoile Carouge	St. Jakob Stadium, Basel
14:30		FCB summary	(yellow card) 62' Martin	Attendance: 6,500; Referee: (Switzerland) Hans Müller (Bern)
Note: FCB were without the suspended Walker, without Berg (in Norway, his wife was expecting a child) and Baumgartner (injured). Jetziner received treatment at halftime for a dislocated finger.

==== League table ====
Pos	Team	Pld	W	D	L	GF	GA	GD	Pts	Qualification
1	Etoile Carouge	18	11	5	2	33	13	+20	27	Advance to promotion/relegation NLA/LNB round
2	Basel	18	12	1	5	39	14	+25	25	Advance to promotion/relegation NLA/LNB round
3	Chênois	18	8	6	4	31	20	+11	22	Continue to relegation round NLB/1. Liga
4	Old Boys	18	6	8	4	27	31	−4	20	Continue to relegation round NLB/1. Liga
5	Monthey	18	6	6	6	25	23	+2	18	Continue to relegation round NLB/1. Liga
6	Bulle	18	7	3	8	28	24	+4	17	Continue to relegation round NLB/1. Liga
7	Grenchen	18	7	3	8	25	24	+1	17	Continue to relegation round NLB/1. Liga
8	SR Delémont	18	7	3	8	24	29	−5	17	Continue to relegation round NLB/1. Liga
9	Fribourg	18	6	1	11	21	28	−7	13	Continue to relegation round NLB/1. Liga
10	Urania Genève Sport	18	2	0	16	11	58	−47	4	Continue to relegation round NLB/1. Liga

Source: rsssf.com
Rules for classification: 1) Points; 2) Goal difference; 3) Goals scored; 4) Head-to-head points; 5) Away goals scored; 6) Draw.

==== Promotion/relegation Phase ====
20 February 1994 Round 1	Basel	1–0	Kriens	St. Jakob Stadium, Basel
14:30	Jeitziner 26' (1:0); Derkach (yellow card) 46'; Berg (yellow card) 66'	FCB summary	(yellow card) 40' Gwerder	Attendance: 8,000; Referee: (Switzerland) Claude Detruche, (Thônex)
Note: FC Basel fielded their full squad, but without the "surplus" players Uccella and Karrer; SC Kriens were without Germann (suspended) and Rölli (injured). The pitch conditions were extremely difficult.

27 February 1994 Round 2	St. Gallen	0–0	Basel	Espenmoos, St. Gallen
14:30	Koch (yellow card) 23'; Tiefenbach (yellow card) 29'	FCB summary	(yellow card) 45' Cantaluppi; (yellow card) 87' Steingruber; (yellow card) 88' Ceccaroni	Attendance: 10,200; Referee: (Switzerland) Daniel Roduit (Sion)
Note: St. Gallen without Rolf Meier (injured), FC Basel without Tabakovic (ill). Very, very difficult terrain.

5 March 1994 Round 3	Basel	0–0	Etoile Carouge	St. Jakob Stadium, Basel
20:00	Meier (yellow card) 32'	FCB summary	(yellow card) 19' Aresu; (yellow card) 42' Langers; (red card) 59' Aguilar	Attendance: 11,500; Referee: (Switzerland) Jürg Herrmann (Hinterkapplen (Wohlen bei Bern))
Note: FCB without Baumgartner and Karrer (not in the squad), Carouge without Amenc, Jacquemet and Rodriguez (not in the squad).

27 February 1994 Round 4	Zürich	1–1	Basel	Letzigrund, Zürich
14:30	Waas 15' (1:0); Kägi (yellow card) 51'	FCB summary FCZ summary	(yellow card) 42' Smajić; 70' (1:1) Zuffi	Attendance: 18,500; Referee: (Switzerland) Gottfried Friedrich (Seedorf)
Note: FC Zürich without the injured Beat Studer and di Jorio, FC Basel without the injured Derkach.

20 March 1994 Round 5	Basel	3–0	Schaffhausen	St. Jakob Stadium, Basel
14:30	Walker (yellow card); Zuffi 20' (1:0); Jeitziner 22' (pen. 2:0); Smajić 62' (pen. 3:0)	FCB summary	(yellow card) Bossi; (yellow card) Beer	Attendance: 12,500; Referee: (Switzerland) Francesco Bianchi (Chiasso)
Note: FC Basel were without the injured Ceccaroni and Derkach, FC Schaffhausen without goalkeeper Hurzeler (suspended) and without the injured Naef, Stuebi and Allenspach. A minute's silence was observed for the late Landhof caretaker René Zurfluh.

26 March 1994 Round 6	Xamax	1–0	Basel	La Maladière, Neuchâtel
17:30	Adriano 68' (1:0)	FCB summary		Attendance: 13,200; Referee: (Switzerland) Karl Strässle (Steinach)

31 March 1994 Round 7	Yverdon-Sports	0–3	Basel	Stade Municipal, Yverdon
20:00	Besnard (yellow card) 38'; Taillet (yellow card) 39'; Castro (yellow card) 40'; Wicht (yellow card) 52'; Juarez (yellow card) 59'	FCB summary	(yellow card) 11' Walker; (yellow card) 63' Smajić; 67' (0:1) Berg; 86' (2:0) Zuffi; 90' (3:0) Zuffi	Attendance: 4,600; Referee: (Switzerland) Freddy Philippoz (Sion)
Note: Yverdon were without Willomet, Castella and Karlen (injured). Basel were without Ceccaroni (injured) and Gigon (ill). At least 3,000 FCB supporters under the 4600 spectators.

9 April 1994 Round 8	Basel	1–1	Yverdon-Sports	St. Jakob Stadium, Basel
20:00	Smajić 26'; Tabakovic (yellow card) 34'; Walker (yellow card)	FCB summary	(yellow card) 30' (red card) 89' Taillet; 68' (o.g.) (Jeitziner); (yellow card) 75' Castro; (yellow card) 76' Bamba	Attendance: 8,800; Referee: (Switzerland) Daniel Roduit (Sion)
Note: Basel were without Cantaluppi (injured), Ceccaroni (youth team), and Berg (not in the squad). Yverdon were without Castella, de Cet, and Karlen (injured).

16 April 1994 Round 9	Basel	3–1	Xamax	St. Jakob Stadium, Basel
20:00	Kruse 41' (pen.); Jeitziner (yellow card) 45'; Zuffi 50' (2:0); Zuffi 79' (3:0)	FCB summary	(yellow card) 45' Piffaretti; (yellow card) 45' Negri; (yellow card) 83' Sutter; 90' Piffaretti	Attendance: 17,000; Referee: (Switzerland) Claude Detruche, (Thônex)
Note: Basel were without Baumgartner (injured) and Derkach (extra foreign player). Xamax were without Ramzy, Moro (injured), Ivanov (national team), Wittl, and Adriano (internally suspended after visiting a nightclub).

23 April 1994 Round 10	Schaffhausen	1–4	Basel	Stadion Breite, Schaffhausen
17:30	Schilling (yellow card) 1'; Leu (yellow card) 66'; Zibert 78'	FCB summary	33' (0:1) Cantaluppi; 49' (0:2) Kruse; 74' (0:3) Zuffi; 83' (0:4) Zuffi	Attendance: 5,800; Referee: (Switzerland) Hans Müller (Bern)
Note: Schaffhausen were without Näf, Allenspach, Bossi, Stoll, Mancastroppa, Guirao (injured) and Pagno (suspended). Basel were without Baumgartner (injured), Derkach and Karrer (not in the squad).

30 April 1994 Round 11	Basel	1–1	Zürich	St. Jakob Stadium, Basel
20:00	Cantaluppi 11'	FCB summary FCZ summary	81' Škoro	Attendance: 42,125; Referee: (Switzerland) Werner Müller (Obererlinsbach)
Note: Basel without Kruse, Baumgartner and Karrer (injured). Fair game, no yellow cards

3 May 1994 Round 12	Etoile Carouge	1–1	Basel	Stade de la Fontenette, Carouge
20:00	Langers 67'; Bel Bahi (yellow card) 70'	FCB summary	74' Zuffi	Attendance: 1,350; Referee: (Switzerland) Stefan Kohli
Note: Carouge were without Mosca, Jacquement, and Bugnard. Basel were without Kruse, Baumgartner, and Karrer (injured).

7 May 1994 Round 13	Basel	3–0	St. Gallen	St. Jakob Stadium, Basel
20:00	Zuffi 39' (1:0); Hertig 71' (2:0); Hertig 85' (3:0)	FCB summary	(yellow card) 35' Winkler	Attendance: 23,000; Referee: (Switzerland) Peter Kellenberger
Note: Basel were without Tabakovic, Karrer, Baumgartner, and Kruse (injured). St. Gallen were without Gertschen (injured).

9 May 1994 Round 14	Kriens	0–1	Basel	St. Jakob Stadium, Basel (Venue change)
20:00	Kälin (yellow card) 35'; Joller (yellow card) 71'	FCB summary	77' Zuffi; (yellow card) 88' Smajić	Attendance: 18,200; Referee: (Switzerland) Marcel Vollenweider
Note: Kriens were without Kern, Rölli, and Reichmuth (injured). Basel were without Tabakovic, Kruse, Baumgartner, and Karrer (injured). SC Kriens' home game was moved to Basel for security reasons.

==== League table ====
Pos	Team	Pld	W	D	L	GF	GA	GD	Pts	Qualification
1	FC Basel	14	7	6	1	22	7	+15	20	Promoted to NLA 1994–95
2	FC St. Gallen	14	8	4	2	28	14	+14	20	Promoted to NLA 1994–95
3	Neuchâtel Xamax	14	9	2	3	21	12	+9	20	Remain in NLA 1994–95
4	FC Zürich	14	7	4	3	24	15	+9	18	Remain in NLA 1994–95
5	SC Kriens	14	4	4	6	21	20	+1	12	Relegated to NLB 1994–95
6	Étoile Carouge FC	14	3	5	6	14	24	−10	11	Remain in NLB 1994–95
7	FC Schaffhausen	14	2	3	9	14	31	−17	7	Remain in NLB 1994–95
8	Yverdon-Sport FC	14	1	2	11	8	29	−21	4	Relegated to NLB 1994–95

Source: rsssf.com
Rules for classification: 1) Points; 2) Goal difference; 3) Goals scored; 4) Head-to-head points; 5) Away goals scored; 6) Draw.

=== Swiss Cup ===
4 September 1993 Round 2	SC Zug	0–10	Basel	Herti Allmend Stadion, Zug
19:30	Bilic (red card) 20'; Baumann (yellow card) 57'	FCB summary	3' (0:1) Karrer; 36' (0:2) Steingruber; 53' (o.g. 0:3) Hermann; 59' (0:4) Walker; 64' (0:5) Karrer; 76' (0:6) Berg; 79' (0:7) M. Rahmen; 83' (0:8) M. Rahmen; 85' (0:9) Zuffi; 88' (0:10) Berg	Attendance: 510; Referee: (Switzerland) Walter Nussbaumer (Crans-près-Céligny)
Note: FCB without Baumgartner, Derkach, Hertig, Schürmann, Uccella (injured), Bauer (headache). Smajic (resting) and Huber (substitute). SC Zuog played the season 1993/94 in the 2. Liga (fourth-tier)

19 September 1993 Round 3	Basel	4–1	Aarau	St. Jakob Stadium, Basel
20:00	Cantaluppi (yellow card) 22'; Jeitziner 52' (pen. 1:1); Smajić (yellow card) 55'; Smajić 59' (2:1); Smajić 72' (3:1); Zuffi 78' (4:1); Walker (yellow card) 83'	FCB summary FCA summary	(yellow card) 14' Stiel; 18' (o.g. 0:1) (Meier); (yellow card) 70' Romano	Attendance: 12,500; Referee: (Switzerland) Dieter Schoch (Attiswil)
Note: Basel were without Derkach, Bauer, and Baumgartner. Aarau were without Pavlicevic, Marini, Bader, and Rupf (all injured).

6 November 1993 Round 4	Basel	2–0	Lausanne-Sport	St. Jakob Stadium, Basel
20:00	Zuffi 45' (1:0); Smajić 57' (2:0); Smajić (yellow card) 84'	FCB summary	(yellow card) 24' Sylvestre; (yellow card) 34' Comisetti	Attendance: 15,062; Referee: (Switzerland) Serge Muhmenthaler (Grenchen)
Note: FC Basel were without Uccella, Baumgartner, Karrer (all injured) and Walker (suspended); Lausanne fielded their strongest lineup. 31st minute, Sogbie's goal was disallowed for a foul.

2 March 1994 Round 5	Basel	1–0	Xamax	St. Jakob Stadium, Basel
17:30	Zuffi 51' (1:0); Walker (yellow card) 69'	FCB summary	(yellow card) 50' Sutter; (yellow card) 66' Henchoz	Attendance: 12,290; Referee: (Switzerland) Serge Muhmenthaler (Grenchen)
Note: FCB without Smajic (suspended), Xamax without Ramzy (Africa Cup with Egypt), Zé Maria (extra foreign player) and Moro (injured).

23 March 1994 Quarterfinal	Basel	1–0 (a.e.t.)	Yverdon-Sports	St. Jakob Stadium, Basel
20:00	Tabakovic (yellow card) 49'; Karrer (yellow card) 105'; Zuffi 118' (1:0)	FCB summary	(yellow card) 3' Derivaz; (yellow card) 86' Juárez; (yellow card) 89' Guex	Attendance: 14,620; Referee: (Switzerland) Kurt Röthlisberger (Suhr)
Note: FCB without Ceccaroni (injured) and Walker (suspended). Yverdon without de Cet (injured) and Castro (suspended).

4 April 1994 Semifinal	Basel	0–0 (a.e.t.) (5–6 p)	Schaffhausen	St. Jakob Stadium, Basel
17:00		FCB summary		Attendance: 23,344; Referee: (Switzerland) Francesco Bianchi (Chiasso)
	Penalties
	Zuffi (penalty missed); Jeitziner (penalty scored); Steingruber (penalty scored); Meier (penalty scored); Kruse (penalty scored); Smajić (penalty scored); Tabakovic (penalty missed)		(penalty scored) Ziffert; (penalty missed) Engesser; (penalty scored) Kuzmanović; (penalty scored) Beer; (penalty scored) Pagno; (penalty scored) Stübi; (penalty scored) Zibert
Note: BFB were without Ceccaroni (injured), Derkach and Uccella (not in the squad). Schaffhausen were without Allenspach, Näf, Bossi and Mancastroppa (injured).

== See also ==
- History of FC Basel
- List of FC Basel players
- List of FC Basel seasons
