= Reto Baumgartner =

Swiss footballer (born 1967)

President of FC Basel
- Incumbent
- Assumed office 17 November 2020
- Preceded by: Bernhard Burgener

Personal details
- Born: 28 April 1967 (age 59) Switzerland
- Height: 1.74 m (5 ft 9 in)
- Occupation: Footballer; Football administrator
Association football career
- Position: Defender
Youth career
- –1986: Wettingen
Senior career*
Years	Team	Apps	(Gls)
1986–1990	Wettingen	81	(7)
1990–1994	Basel	87	(13)
1994–1995	Amicitia Riehen		
Total		168	(20)
International career
- Switzerland (beach soccer)
- * Club domestic league appearances and goals

Reto Baumgartner (born 28 April 1967) is a retired Swiss professional footballer who played in the late 1980s and early 1990s as defender. Since FC Basel's AGM in 2008, Baumgartner is a member of the club board of directors and since 16 November 2020, he is president of the club. He is businessman and member of the Basel-Stadt trade association.

== Football career ==
Baumgartner played his youth football with Wettingen. He advanced to their first team for the first time during the 1984–85 Nationalliga A season, but usually played for their youth team. In 1987 he signed his first professional contract with the club and played solely for their first team. At the end of the 1986–87 season, Baumgartner and the team suffered relegation to the Nationalliga B. But he remained with the team and in the following season they achieved immediate promotion.

Following his involvement in the Klötzli incident on 7 October 1989, Baumgartner was given a 10-month professional ban. His contract with Wettingen expired during this time and so he moved on.

Baumgartner then found a helping hand from Basel and joined their first team for their 1990–91 season under head-coach Ernst August Künnecke. At that time Basel played on the Nationalliga B, the second tier of Swiss football. Baumgartner played his domestic league debut for his new club in the home game in the St. Jakob Stadium on 6 October 1990 as Basel won 2–1 against Kriens. He scored his first goal for his club three days later, in the very next game, away against Locarno. In fact he scored two goals and Basel won 3–2.

Baumgartner stayed with Basel four seasons and made a name for himself as being stubborn, combative and relentless. During his last season with the club, Basel's 1993–94 season, his teammates were the likes of Swiss international goalkeeper Stefan Huber, defenders Massimo Ceccaroni, Marco Walker and Samir Tabakovic, the midfielders Mario Cantaluppi, Martin Jeitziner, Admir Smajić and Ørjan Berg and the Swiss international striker Dario Zuffi. Together they won the promotion/relegation group and thus won promotion to the top flight of Swiss football, after six seasons in the second tier. Baumgartner then ended his active football career. Baumgartner's very last match was on 27 May 1994 as Basel played a test game against the Swiss national team.

Between the years 1990 and 1994 Baumgartner played a total of 122 games for Basel scoring a total of 21 goals. 87 of these games were in the Nationalliga A, nine in the Swiss Cup and 26 were friendly games. He scored 13 goals in the domestic league, one in the cup and the other seven were scored during the test games.

Following his time with Basel, Baumgartner moved on to amateur local team FC Amicitia Riehen. But he hung his football boots on a hook and turned to professional beach soccer and played for the Swiss national team.

== Non playing career ==
Since FC Basel's AGM in 2008, Baumgartner is a member of the club's board of directors. He was elected because of his involvement with beach soccer.

The club's 126th AGM was due to take place on 9 November 2020, but due to the COVID-19 situation, it took place in written form during the week from 6 November to 13 November 2020. Before the AGM the club's presiding chairman Burgener stepped down and vacated his position. At the AGM there were 2,589 votes with valid rights, the absolute majority was thus 1,295. Baumgartner received 2,382 votes and was elected back into the board, for the position as club president Baumgartner received 2,326 votes and thus elected as the new president of the club FC Basel 1893.

== Private life ==
Baumgartner visited Baden vocational school from 1983 to 1986 to become commercial clerk. Then he signed his first professional contract with Wettingen. Following his professional football career, from 1992 to 2001 Baumgartner worked for Manor (department store) at their headquarters in Basel and was HR specialist and manager responsible for their apprentices.

Since 2001 Reto Baumgartner is with the Basel-Stadt trade association, now as vice-director. The trade association is the largest and most traditional employer organisation in the Canton of Basel-Stadt. Baumgartner is head of vocational training and head of human resources. He leads the vocational training commission, which deals with specific questions in the field of commercial training for the next generation in all industries and for further training of entrepreneurs and their employees.

== Sources ==
- Die ersten 125 Jahre. Publisher: Josef Zindel im Friedrich Reinhardt Verlag, Basel. ISBN 978-3-7245-2305-5
- Verein "Basler Fussballarchiv" Homepage
