= Joller =

Joller is a surname. Notable people with the surname include:

- Ivan Joller (born 1983), Swiss biathlete
- Karmen Joller (born 1976), Estonian doctor and politician
- Manfred Joller (born 1968), Swiss footballer
