= Axel Kruse =

German footballer (born 1967)

Personal information
- Full name: Axel Kruse
- Date of birth: 28 September 1967 (age 59)
- Place of birth: Wolgast, East Germany
- Height: 1.79 m (5 ft 10 in)
- Position: Striker

Youth career
- 1974–1976: Dynamo Wolgast
- 1976–1981: Motor Wolgast
- 1981–1985: FC Hansa Rostock

Senior career*
Years	Team	Apps	(Gls)
1985–1989	FC Hansa Rostock	79	(14)
1989–1991	Hertha BSC	24	(9)
1991–1993	Eintracht Frankfurt	54	(14)
1993–1996	VfB Stuttgart	64	(14)
1994	→ FC Basel (loan)	3	(2)
1996–1998	Hertha BSC	40	(15)

International career
- East Germany Youth
	East Germany U-21	1	(0)
- * Club domestic league appearances and goals

Axel Kruse (born 28 September 1967) is a German former association football and American football player. Kruse was born in Wolgast, East Germany, and played for several Bundesliga football clubs.

== Football career ==
As player of Hansa Rostock, following an away game in Copenhagen on 8 July 1989, Kruse fled to West Germany with the help of friends. He joined Hertha BSC. During the winter break of the 1990–91 Bundesliga season Kruse transferred to Eintracht Frankfurt. For the 1993–94 Bundesliga he transferred to VfB Stuttgart. In Stuttgart he experienced a bad first year. He just ten appearances, eight of which as substitute and received a ban for assaulting referee Hans-Joachim Osmers in a DFB Cup game.

Kruse joined FC Basel during the second half of their 1993–94 season under head coach Claude Andrey. Kruse played his debut for his new club in the home game in the St. Jakob Stadium on 4 April as Basel played in the Swiss Cup semi-final against Schaffhausen. The game ended goalless after extra-time. Kruse converted his spot-kick, but despite this Basel were defeated 5–6 after penalties. Kruse played his domestic league debut for them one week later on 9 April in the home game as Basel drew 1–1 against Yverdon-Sports. He scored his first goal for the team another week later, on 16 April, in the home game as Basel won 3–1 against Xamax. It was the first goal of the match and Kruse converted a penalty. Kruse's last game with Basel was the away match against Schaffhausen on 23 April, in which he also scored a goal, as the visitors were 4–1 winners. After this he injured himself and missed the remainder of the season.

Following his loan period, Kruse returned to VfB Stuttgart for two further seasons and he ended his active career after two further seasons with Hertha BSC.

After retiring from football, Kruse played American football as a placekicker for NFL Europe's team Berlin Thunder from 1999 to 2003. during his stint, he won the World Bowl in 2001 and 2002.

Kruse later worked as a pundit for German TV channel Sport1.

== Sources ==
- Die ersten 125 Jahre. Publisher: Josef Zindel im Friedrich Reinhardt Verlag, Basel. ISBN 978-3-7245-2305-5
- Axel Kruse at Verein "Basler Fussballarchiv" site
- Olympic Stadium: The Unity Derby. In: Sites of Unity (Haus der Geschichte), 2022.
