= Birmingham Trophy =

- Founded: 1992
- Region: Europe
- Teams: 4
- Current champions: (England) Birmingham City (1st title)
- Most championships: (England) Birmingham City (1 title)

The Birmingham Trophy was an invitational football tournament held at St Andrew's, Birmingham. The only edition took place between 8 and 9 August 1992. It was contested by four teams, one from Italy, one from Spain, and two from the host nation England.

== Tournament ==
=== Bracket ===
Semi-finals
8 August – Birmingham (St Andrew's)
(England) Coventry City	1
(Italy) Brescia	0
8 August – Birmingham (St Andrew's)
(England) Birmingham City	1
(Spain) Real Mallorca	1

Final
9 August – Birmingham (St Andrew's)
(England) Birmingham City	1
(England) Coventry City	0
Third place
9 August – Birmingham (St Andrew's)
(Italy) Brescia	1
(Spain) Real Mallorca	1

Birmingham City beat Real Mallorca 6–5 on penalties.
Real Mallorca beat Brescia 4–3 on penalties.

=== Results ===
8 August 1998 Semi Final	Coventry City	1 – 0	Brescia	St Andrew's
	Smith 64'

8 August 1998 Semi Final	Birmingham City	1 – 1 (6–5 p)	Real Mallorca	St Andrew's

9 August 1998 3rd/4th Place	Real Mallorca	1 – 1 (4–3 p)	Brescia	St Andrew's
	Juanan 9'		Hagi 11'

9 August 1998 Final	Birmingham City	1 – 0	Coventry City	St Andrew's
	Gomes 49' (pen.)		Palumbo 57'
