= Christophe Moulin (footballer, born 1971) =

Swiss footballer and manager

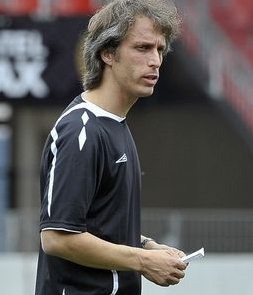

Personal information
- Date of birth: 23 April 1971 (age 55)
- Position: Defender

Senior career*
Years	Team	Apps	(Gls)
1992–1993	Étoile Carouge FC		
1993–1994	SR Delémont		
1994–1995	FC Solothurn		
1996	Neuchâtel Xamax		

Managerial career
- 2004: Neuchâtel Xamax
- * Club domestic league appearances and goals

Christophe Moulin (born 23 April 1971) is a football coach and former player from Switzerland who works as "Performance Coach" for the Irish Football Association and who is the currently first-team coach for Ligue 1 club Nice.

Moulin played for four Swiss professional clubs before taking up the role of Academy Manager of Neuchâtel Xamax FC for five years.

During the 2003–04 season he was appointed as caretaker head coach of Swiss Super League club Neuchâtel Xamax FC and managed to save them from relegation.
