= Peter Beer =

Peter Beer may also refer to:

- Peter Beer (judge) (1928–2018), American judge
- Peter Beer (RAF officer) (born 1941), British Air Vice Marshal
- Peter Beer (historian) (1758-1838), Jewish enlightenment historian
