= Betrand Fillistorf =

Swiss footballer (born 1961)

Personal information
- Date of birth: 30 August 1961 (age 65)
- Position: Goalkeeper

Senior career*
Years	Team	Apps	(Gls)
–1979	FC Fribourg		
1980–1993	FC Bulle		
- * Club domestic league appearances and goals

Betrand Fillistorf (born 30 August 1961) is a retired Swiss football goalkeeper.
