= Manfred Joller =

Swiss footballer (born 1968)

Personal information
- Date of birth: 10 April 1968 (age 58)
- Place of birth: Stans, Switzerland
- Positions: Defender; defensive midfielder

Senior career*
Years	Team	Apps	(Gls)
1987–1991	FC Luzern		
1991–1992	SC Zug		
1992–1995	SC Kriens		
1995–1999	FC Luzern		
1999–2000	SC Kriens		
- * Club domestic league appearances and goals

Manfred Joller (born 10 April 1968) is a retired Swiss football defender.
