= Philippe Hertig =

Swiss footballer (born 1965)

Personal information
- Date of birth: 2 July 1965 (age 61)
- Place of birth: Lausanne, Switzerland
- Height: 1.84 m (6 ft 0 in)
- Positions: Midfielder; striker

Youth career
- –1983: Lausanne Sport

Senior career*
Years	Team	Apps	(Gls)
1983–1988	Lausanne Sport	124	(14)
1988–1990	Servette	5	(0)
1988–1989	→ ES Malley (loan)	25	(0)
1990–1993	Lugano	93	(9)
1993–1995	FC Basel	52	(7)
1995–2000	Étoile Carouge FC	65	(25)
Total		364	(55)

International career
1987–1990	Switzerland	3	(0)
- * Club domestic league appearances and goals

Philippe Hertig (born 2 July 1965) is a Swiss former footballer who played as a striker during the 1980s and 1990s. He is banker and is now assistant director of Mirabaud Group. In 2009 Hertig joined the Swiss Football Association as member of the central committee. Since March 2014 he is member of the Swiss sub-section of Special Olympics and since April 2015 he is committee member in the UEFA.

== Club career ==
Hertig played his youth football with Lausanne Sport and advanced to their first team, signing his first professional contract, under head-coach Péter Pázmándy in September 1983. After a very hard first year, Hertig became regular starter during his second season with them. Hertig played six seasons with Lausanne and then he moved on. He signed for Servette in 1988, but was loaned out to ES Malley in the second tier of Swiss football. After the loan season Hertig returned to Servette, but could not break into their first formation and so at the end of the season he moved on.

Before the 1990–91 Nationalliga A season he signed for Lugano and played with them for three seasons. In the 1992–93 season Hertig contributed to the team reaching the final and winning the Swiss Cup.

The following season Hertig moved on and signed for FC Basel, who at that time played in the Nationalliga B, the second tier of Swiss football. Hertig joined Basel's first team for their 1993–94 season under head-coach Claude Andrey. After playing in five test games, Hertig played his domestic league debut for his new club in the home game in the St. Jakob Stadium on 28 July 1993 Basel as were defeated 1–2 by local rivals Old Boys. He scored his first goal for his club just three days later, on 31 July in an away game. It was the first goal of the match as Basel won 3–0 against Bulle.

During that season his teammates were the likes of Swiss international goalkeeper Stefan Huber, defenders Massimo Ceccaroni, Marco Walker and Samir Tabakovic, the midfielders Mario Cantaluppi, Martin Jeitziner, Admir Smajić and Ørjan Berg and the Swiss international striker Dario Zuffi. Together they won the promotion/relegation group, became Nationalliga B champions and thus won promotion to the top flight of Swiss football. This after six seasons in the second tier.

He stayed with the club until the end of the following season and during his two seasons with the club Hertigplayed a total of 86 games for Basel scoring a total of 17 goals. 52 of these games were in the Nationalliga A, seven in the Swiss Cup and 27 were friendly games. He scored seven goals in the domestic league, three in the Cup and the other 11 were scored during the test games.

Then Étoile Carouge FC acquired his services in 1995. Hertig retired from his professional football career in 1997 and continued as semi-professional.

== International career ==
In addition to his club career, Hertig was also called up to play for his country. He made three appearances for the Switzerland national team between 1987 and 1990. He played his debut for his country on 16 December 1987 as the Swiss were defeated 2–0 by Israel.

== Personal life ==
In 1995, as Hertig moved to Geneva, Hertig started working for the Union Bank of Switzerland, who later became UBS. He worked in patrimony management in private banking, Key Clients and in the Sports and Entertainment Group for about 15 years. He then worked four years for Julius Baer Group. In 2014 he joined his present employer Mirabaud Group and is assistant director.

In 2009 Hertig joined the Association suisse de football (ASF) as member of the central committee. He is their treasurer. Since March 2014 he is member of the Swiss sub-section of Special Olympics and is part of the Foundation for the integration and promotion, through sport, of people with specific needs. Since April 2015 he is member of the Beach Soccer and Futsal Commission for the UEFA.

== Sources ==
- Rotblau: Jahrbuch Saison 2017/2018. Publisher: FC Basel Marketing AG. ISBN 978-3-7245-2189-1
- Die ersten 125 Jahre. Publisher: Josef Zindel im Friedrich Reinhardt Verlag, Basel. ISBN 978-3-7245-2305-5
- Verein "Basler Fussballarchiv" Homepage
