= Claude Andrey =

Swiss footballer and manager (born 1951)

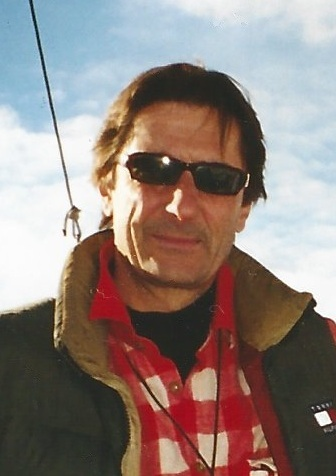

Personal information
- Date of birth: 13 June 1951 (age 75)
- Place of birth: Genève, Switzerland
- Height: 1.73 m (5 ft 8 in)
- Position: Midfielder

Team information
- Current team: Yverdon-Sport FC

Youth career
- Servette FC

Senior career*
Years	Team	Apps	(Gls)
1969–1971	Etoile Carouge		
1971–1972	Grasshopper Club Zürich		
1972–1973	Etoile Carouge		
1973–1974	Neuchâtel Xamax		
1974–1980	Servette FC		
1980	FC Grenoble		
1980–1981	FC Sion		
1981–1982	Neuchâtel Xamax		
1982–1983	FC Mulhouse		
1983–1985	Lausanne Sports		
1985–1986	FC Bulle		

International career
1976–1980	Switzerland	9	(0)

Managerial career
- 1986–1988: FC Bulle
- 1988–1989: FC Renens
- 1990–1992: FC Chiasso
- 1993: FC Sion
- 1993–1995: FC Basel
- Cameroon U-21
- Tonnerre Yaoundé
- 1998–2001: Apollon Kalamarias F.C.
- 2002: Etoile Carouge
- 2002–2003: Congo
- 2004–2005: Espérance Sportive de Tunis
- 2006–2008: Yverdon-Sport FC
- * Club domestic league appearances and goals

Claude "Didi" Andrey (born 13 June 1951) is a former Swiss footballer, who most recently managed Yverdon-Sport FC in the Challenge League.

Andrey took over FC Basel for their 1993–94 season. His team included the likes of Swiss international goalkeeper Stefan Huber, defenders Massimo Ceccaroni, Marco Walker, Reto Baumgartner and Samir Tabakovic, the midfielders Mario Cantaluppi, Martin Jeitziner, Admir Smajić and Ørjan Berg and the Swiss international strikers Dario Zuffi and Philippe Hertig. Together they won the promotion/relegation group and became Nationalliga B champions and thus won promotion to the top flight of Swiss football. This after six seasons in the second tier.

He stayed with the club the next season, but was fired during the starting months of his third season.
