= Martin Jeitziner =

Swiss footballer (born 1963)

Personal information
- Date of birth: 13 January 1963 (age 63)
- Place of birth: Basel, Switzerland
- Position: Midfielder

Youth career
- 1972–1980: FC Basel

Senior career*
Years	Team	Apps	(Gls)
1980–1986	FC Basel	130	(28)
1986–1989	Young Boys	85	(15)
1989–1991	Neuchâtel Xamax	43	(1)
1991–1995	FC Basel	113	(9)
1995–1996	BSC Old Boys		

International career
- Switzerland U21
- * Club domestic league appearances and goals

Martin Jeitziner (born 13 January 1963) is a Swiss former professional footballer who played as a midfielder in the 1980s and 1990s.

== Career ==
Jeitziner played his youth football with FC Basel and advanced to their first team during their 1980–81 season under head-coach Helmut Benthaus. The team were reigning Swiss champions and Benthaus wanted to integrate the youngster into the team. Jeitziner played his domestic league debut for the club in the away game in the Charmilles Stadium on 9 Mai 1981 as Basel were defeated 1–2 by Servette. He played his second game just one week later in the home game in the St. Jakob Stadium against Luzern. These were the only two games that he played in this season.

During the following season trainer Benthaus used Jeitziner as a substitute, substituting him in during various Cup of the Alps matches and test games at the beginning of the season. He scored his first goal for his club on 26 September in a Swiss Cup away game. Again he was substituted in at half time and he scored his goal in the 82nd minute as Basel won 9–1 against FC Sursee. Jeitziner scored his first league goal for the club just one week later. Same situation, he was substituted in at half time and he scored his goal in the 49th minute, but it did not help the team, as they lost 1–3 against Zürich.

Following this Jeitziner became a regular starter in the team. He played in 22 of the 30 league matches in their 1981–82 season and in these he was able to score eight goals. Together with team-mate Erni Maissen he was joint team's top league goal scorer. Same picture in Basel's 1982–83 season. Although manager Benthaus left the club, under his successor Rainer Ohlhauser the young midfielder remained a team regular. Together with his team-mates Jörg Stohler and young striker Beat Sutter, Jeitziner was again team's joint top league scorer, each netted seven times. For Basel's 1983–84 season Ernst-August Künnecke was appointed as head-coach and although he was known for his good work with the youngsters, the team slipped into the midfield of the league and the club started suffering financial problems. Jeitziner stayed with the club until the end of the 1985–86 season and then he moved on.

Jeitziner signed for reigning Swiss champions BSC Young Boys and played for them for three seasons, but the team could not repeat their success. Again, Jeitziner moved on, this time to Xamax and he stayed here for two seasons.

In the pre-season to the 1991–92 season Jeitziner returned to his club of origin, who in the mean-time had been relegated and were desperately trying to achieve promotion. But this aim failed in this season and in the following. During Basel's 1993–94 season, under head-coach Claude Andrey, his team mates were the likes of Swiss international goalkeeper Stefan Huber, defenders Massimo Ceccaroni, Marco Walker and Samir Tabakovic, the midfielders Mario Cantaluppi, Reto Baumgartner, Admir Smajić and Ørjan Berg and the Swiss international strikers Dario Zuffi and Philippe Hertig. Together they won the promotion/relegation group, became Nationalliga B champions and thus won promotion to the top flight of Swiss football. This after six seasons in the second tier.

After the promotion season, Jeitziner stayed with Basel another season. In the qualification round they were in seventh position, thus above the cut-line and so qualified for the championship round, which they also ended in seventh position.

Jeitziner then moved on to local club BSC Old Boys who at that time played in the 1st League and ended his professional playing career. One year later he again moved on to amateur local club FC Allschwil as player-coach.

== Honours ==
- Swiss Super Cup: 1986
- Swiss Cup: 1986–87

== Sources ==
- Rotblau: Jahrbuch Saison 2017/2018. Publisher: FC Basel Marketing AG. ISBN 978-3-7245-2189-1
- Die ersten 125 Jahre. Publisher: Josef Zindel im Friedrich Reinhardt Verlag, Basel. ISBN 978-3-7245-2305-5
- Verein "Basler Fussballarchiv" Homepage
