= Ørjan Berg =

Norwegian footballer (born 1968)

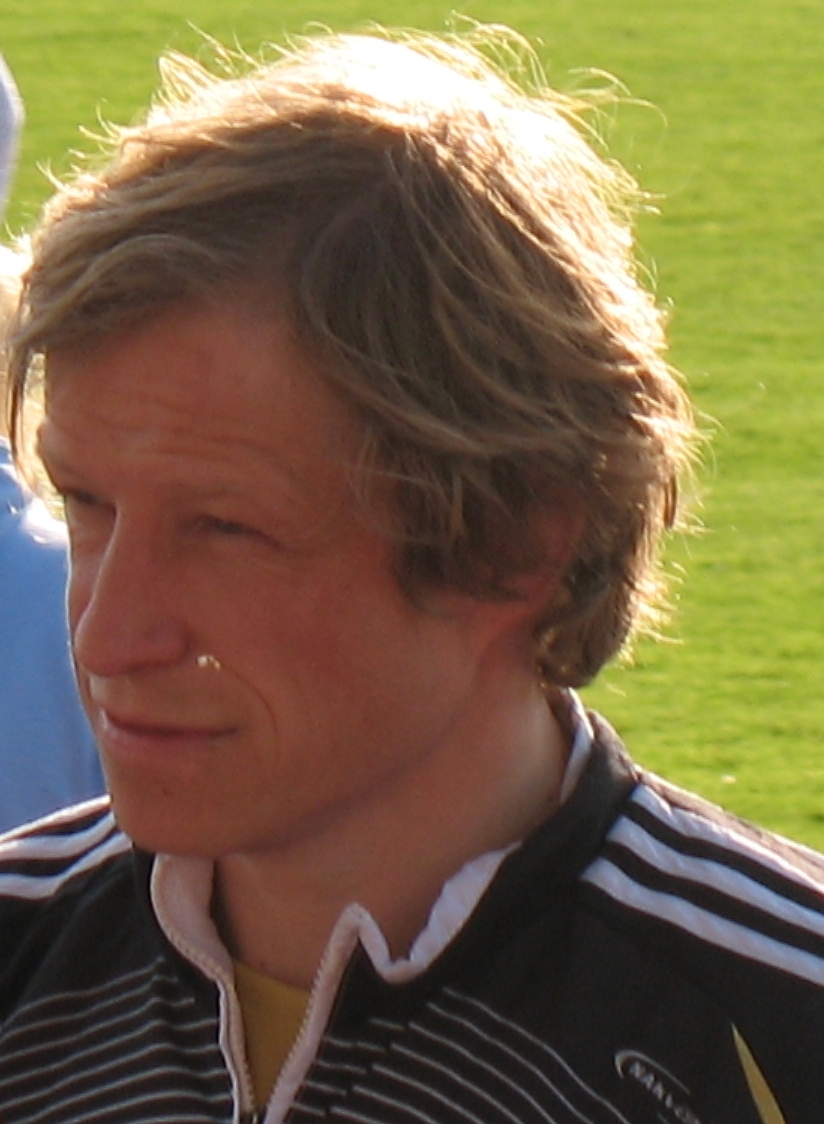
- Berg in 2006

Personal information
- Date of birth: 20 August 1968 (age 58)
- Place of birth: Bodø, Norway
- Height: 1.72 m (5 ft 8 in)
- Position: Midfielder

Senior career*
| Years | Team | Apps | (Gls) |
| 1987–1988 | Bodø/Glimt | 16 | (2) |
| 1988–1990 | Rosenborg | 65 | (11) |
| 1990–1992 | FC Wettingen | 23 | (5) |
| 1992 | 1860 Munich | 8 | (0) |
| 1992–1994 | FC Basel | 65 | (18) |
| 1994–1999 | Bodø/Glimt | 97 | (10) |
| 1999–2006 | Rosenborg | 123 | (10) |
| Total | | 397 | (56) |

International career
| 1988–2000 | Norway | 19 | (1) |
- * Club domestic league appearances and goals

Ørjan Berg (born 20 August 1968) is a Norwegian former professional footballer who played as a midfielder. He is the current sporting director of Bodø/Glimt.

Berg retired at the end of the 2006 season, having played for Bodø/Glimt, Wettingen, TSV 1860 Munich, Basel and Rosenborg. He is the brother of Bodø/Glimt player Runar Berg and the son of midfielder and playmaker Harald Berg. He is also the father of Patrick Berg, also a Bodø/Glimt player and the last years frequently seen playing for Norway national football team, following in his father's footsteps.

== Club career ==
Berg first played – as his father had – at Bodø/Glimt, then playing in the 2nd division, later moving up to the 1st. In 1988 Rosenborg coach Nils Arne Eggen brought him and his friend Jahn Ivar "Mini" Jakobsen from Bodø/Glimt to Rosenborg, where they won the double in their debut year in the Norwegian top division.

After two seasons at Rosenborg, Berg was sold to Swiss club FC Wettingen during the winter break of the 1990–91 Nationalliga A. Berg played the first half of the 1991–92 Nationalliga A season with Wettingen, but could not save the team from slumping to the bottom of the league table. He spent the second half of the season playing in Germany for 1860 Munich.

Berg joined Basel's first team for their 1992–93 season under head-coach Friedel Rausch. Basel at that time were playing in the Nationalliga B and their priority aim was the promotion. After playing in three test games, Berg played his domestic league debut for his new club in the first game of the season, an away game, on 18 July 1992 as Basel were defeated 0–1 by Grenchen. Berg scored his first goal for the club in the home game in the St. Jakob Stadium on 18 August. It was the third goal of the match as Basel won 7–0 against Bümpliz. Berg was a regular starter, he played 35 of the 36 league matches scoring nine goals, but Basel missed their promotion aim finishing fourth in the league table.

During Basel's 1993–94 season, under new head-coach Claude Andrey, his teammates were the likes of Swiss international goalkeeper Stefan Huber, defenders Massimo Ceccaroni, Marco Walker and Samir Tabakovic, the midfielders Mario Cantaluppi, Martin Jeitziner, Admir Smajić and Reto Baumgartner and the Swiss international strikers Dario Zuffi and Philippe Hertig. Together they won the promotion/relegation group and became Nationalliga B champions and thus won promotion to the top flight of Swiss football. This after six seasons in the second tier.

Despite being regular starter and winning the second division championship Berg decided to move on. During his two seasons with the club Berg played a total of 102 games for Basel scoring a total of 27 goals. 65 of these games were in the Nationalliga A, 11 in the Swiss Cup and 26 were friendly games. He scored 18 goals in the domestic league, four in the cup and the other five were scored during the test games.

Thus, he returned to his home club Bodø/Glimt in 1996. The team was now back in the top division, Berg played for three seasons losing a cup final against Tromsø IL in 1996. In 1999 Rosenborg needed to strengthen its team to play in the UEFA Champions League, and Berg went on loan to Rosenborg. Later that year he was traded to Rosenborg.

In mid-season 2006, he returned to his home town Bodø, trying to recover from injuries which has plagued him in the last (almost) two years. If he recovered, he said he would join Rosenborg again when preseason starts at the beginning of 2007 – which would have been his last season according to his contract. However, it became increasingly clear that his injury would never be completely healed, and he decided to terminate his contract a year early. His official farewell ceremony took place in the recess of the Rosenborg – Viking match on 29 October.

== International career ==
Berg made his debut for the Norwegian national team in 1988, but after Egil Olsen became coach Berg was rarely found good enough for the squad. He got a second chance when Norway got Nils Johan Semb as coach in 1998 and Berg played on the national team again 10 years after his debut. He earned a total of 19 caps, scoring 1 goal. His last international match was a February 2000 friendly match against Sweden. In 2002, Berg declared that he retired from the national team.

== Personal life ==
He is married and has two sons, Bodø/Glimt player Patrick and Marius.

== Honours ==
Rosenborg

- Norwegian top division: 1988, 1990, 1999, 2000, 2001, 2002, 2003, 2004, 2006
- Norwegian Cup: 1988, 1999, 2003

Basel

- Nationnaliga B and promotion: 1994

Individual

- Kniksen of the Year: 2001
- Kniksen award as Midfielder of the Year: 2000, 2001, 2002

== Sources ==
- Die ersten 125 Jahre. Publisher: Josef Zindel im Friedrich Reinhardt Verlag, Basel. ISBN 978-3-7245-2305-5
- Verein "Basler Fussballarchiv" Homepage
