= Massimo Ceccaroni =

Swiss footballer (born 1968)

Personal information
- Date of birth: 15 August 1968 (age 58)
- Place of birth: Basel, Switzerland
- Height: 1.73 m (5 ft 8 in)
- Positions: Defender; midfielder

Team information
- Current team: FC Basel (board of directors)

Youth career
- 1977–1987: Basel

Senior career*
Years	Team	Apps	(Gls)
1987–2002	Basel	398	(0)
2002–2005	SC Dornach		
2005–2007	Old Boys		

Managerial career
- 2005–2012: Old Boys
- 2012–2013: Basel Reserves
- 2015–2017: Basel Reserves
- * Club domestic league appearances and goals

Massimo Ceccaroni (born 15 August 1968) is a Swiss former professional footballer who played as a defender or midfielder. He played for FC Basel for very nearly his entire career. He was later trainer at amateur club BSC Old Boys and then trainer of the Basel U21 team. Between 2012 and 2020 he was technical manager of the youth department. Since 2017 he is on Board of Directors of the FCB Holding AG and since January 2020 general manager sports project India, Chennai City FC - FC Basel.

== Career ==
=== Active football ===
In 1977, Ceccaroni joined FC Basel's youth squad and advanced to their first team for their 1987–88 season signing his first professional contract under head-coach Urs Siegenthaler. After playing in four test games, Ceccaroni played his domestic league debut for his club in an away match on 3 October 1987 as Basel were defeated 5–0 by Lausanne-Sport. His teammates included goalie Urs Suter, defender Peter Bernauer, and Switzerland national team players such as Adrian Knup, Dominique Herr and Peter Nadig. Despite this personally strongly occupied team Basel were relegated to the Nationalliga B after the 1987–88 Nationalliga A season.

Ceccaroni scored his first league goal for his club on 7 October 1992 in the home game at the St. Jakob Stadium. It was the first goal of the game as Basel won 3–0 against Chênois. Because Ceccaroni was not known for goal scoring, his other league goals are mentioned here. His second was scored five weeks later on 14 November is also documented here. It was the second goal of the match as Basel won 8–0 against Urania Genève Sport.

Nearly one year later, during Basel's 1993–94 season, on 11 September 1993, in the derby against local rivals Old Boys, Ceccaroni scored his next league goals. This happened in the stoppage time of the first half. Ceccaroni rushed down the right wing, staying remarkably close to the side line all the way, and after having run more than 50 meters he crossed the ball very high to the middle. As it seemed that the ball would fly over the cross bar, it suddenly dropped and fell into the goal. It was the first goal of the match as Basel won 6–1. His fourth and last league goal of his professional career was scored on 30 October, seven weeks later. It was the last goal of the home game as Basel were 3–1 victorious against Monthey. During this season, under head-coach Claude Andrey, Ceccaroni's teammates were the likes of Swiss international goalkeeper Stefan Huber, defenders Reto Baumgartner, Marco Walker and Samir Tabakovic, the midfielders Mario Cantaluppi, Martin Jeitziner, Admir Smajić and Ørjan Berg and the Swiss international strikers Dario Zuffi and Philippe Hertig. Together they won the promotion/relegation group and became Nationalliga B champions and thus won promotion to the top flight of Swiss football. This after six seasons in the second tier.

Ceccaroni remained with the club for another eight Nationalliga A seasons. In their 2001–02 season they won the national double, Championship and the Swiss Cup. Because he did not have many appearances in the team, Basel did not renew Ceccaroni's contract at the end of that season and his career came to an end. Between the years 1987 and 2002 Ceccaroni played a total of 605 games for Basel scoring a total of six goals. 398 of these games were in the Nationalliga A, 34 in the Swiss Cup and 153 were friendly games. He scored those four mentioned goals in the domestic league and the other two were scored during the test games.

Because Basel did not renew his contract, Ceccaroni retired from professional football and joined local amateur side SC Dornach so that he could complete his trainer diplomas.

=== Summary and curiosity ===
Summary

As nine-year old Ceccaroni joined FC Basel and as nineteen year old he advanced to the first team. In his first season he suffered relegation, six years later he was promotion. The finest moments of Ceccaroni's career were, firstly, winning the Nationalliga B in 1994 and, secondly, the Nationalliga A championship and the Swiss Cup in 2002, these were Basel's first titles in 22 years.

Ceccaroni is considered as a cult figure in Basel. This mainly because he stayed loyal to the club for 25 years and always showed full commitment in each of his games. On the other hand, also because he never scored a goal in the top division during his entire professional career, not even then when he took his only penalty.

Curiosity

In the match against Grasshopper Club on 29 September 2002 in the Stadion Schützenmatte it came to this situation. In the 4th minute of stoppage time GC goalkeeper Stefan Huber brought down Basel's goal getter Jean-Michel Tchouga in the penalty area and was then shown the red card. Oliver Kreuzer, Basel's designated penalty shooter, lays the ball down, but then the spectators intervene. «Massimo, Massimo!» The first tentative calls swell to a noise tornado. Ceccaroni's Christian name echoes through the small stadium through thousands of throats. The game is deep in stoppage time, Basel lead 1–0 and are preparing to take over the top of the table. But that is only a minor matter. What really counts is solely the wish that Massimo Ceccaroni finally makes himself immortal.

On the pitch, Kreuzer is skeptical. He doesn't want to jeopardize the victory and asks the referee how long he will let the game go. The answer: The penalty is the last action, then it's over. Finally Kreuzer decides: "Come on, Massimo, put that thing away!", and he gives the ball to Ceccaroni. He later said: "I was nervous, but at the same time, I felt very safe." No wonder, Ceccaroni already had his part in the game for the preceding goal. Reto Zanni, under pressure from Tchouga, had deflected his cross into his own goal. In addition, after Huber's dismissal, there is a greenhorn in the GC goal. The 18-year-old Peter Jehle makes his league debut. When should it work, if not today?

As Ceccaroni runs up, the fans collectively hold their breath. But instead of an explosion of cheers, it comes to a big disappointment. Jehle blocks Ceccaroni's weak attempt. Alltough the ball lands before Ceccaronis's boots and although he nails it into the net via the lower edge of the crossbar, but – oh dear – referee Stuchlik had already blown his whistle. What a drama! Ceccaroni shrugs his shoulders in embarrassment, the end of the dream of his dream of his first top level goal. Basel win 1-0 and "Massimos" mythos reached unimagined heights with the miss. Kreuzer reports on the field: "Until now, Ceccaroni was a legend, but from now on he is mega-cult." Even the unlucky person himself takes it with humor: "I would rather score a goal out of the game anyway." He will never succeed. In 2002, after nearly 400 games for Basel, he left the football business, goalless at top level.

=== Retirement ===
After his retirement from professional football he joined amateur side SC Dornach for three seasons. Then he moved to BSC Old Boys and became player-coach and then manager. He remained in this position until 2012. In the summer of 2012, he took over as technical director of Basel's youth department. He spent three seasons as head-coach of Basel's U-21 youth team. Since 2017 he is on Board of Directors of the FCB Holding AG and since January 2020 general manager sports project India, Chennai City FC–FC Basel.

== Personal life ==
Ceccaroni, whose parents are from Italy, was born in Basel and grew up in the quarter Saint Johann. Ceccaroni is co-owner of ABT Bodenbeläge AG and worked there for ten years. He has an elder brother, Stefano, who also played for Basel.

== Honours ==
FC Basel

- Swiss Championship: 2001–02
- Swiss Cup: 2001–02
