= Admir Smajić =

Bosnian footballer (born 1963)

Personal information
- Date of birth: 7 September 1963 (age 63)
- Place of birth: Bijeljina, SR Bosnia and Herzegovina, Yugoslavia
- Height: 1.79 m (5 ft 10 in)
- Position: Defender

Youth career
- –1979: Radnik Bijeljina

Senior career*
Years	Team	Apps	(Gls)
1979–1988	Partizan	194	(9)
1988–1993	Neuchâtel Xamax	99	(15)
1993–1997	Basel	111	(12)
1997–1999	Young Boys	26	(2)
Total		430	(38)

International career
1984	Yugoslav Olympic	5	(0)
1987	Yugoslavia	5	(0)
1996	Bosnia and Herzegovina	2	(0)

Managerial career
- 1998: Young Boys
- 1999: Young Boys
- 2001–2002: Bosnia and Herzegovina U21
- 2003–2004: Yverdon-Sport
- 2004: Sion
- 2011: Yverdon-Sport (assistant)
- 2014: Sion (assistant)
- 2015: Sion II
- 2018: Sloboda Tuzla (team manager)
- 2019: Sloboda Tuzla (team manager)
Medal record
Men's Football
Representing Yugoslavia
Olympic Games
Bronze medal – third place	1984 Los Angeles	Team
- * Club domestic league appearances and goals

Admir Smajić (born 7 September 1963) is a Bosnian professional football manager and former player.

He played in the Yugoslavia national team and the Bosnia and Herzegovina national team.

== Club career ==
=== Partizan ===
Born in Bijeljina, SR Bosnia and Herzegovina, Smajić began his career in his local town with FK Radnik Bijeljina. In 1979 Radnik reached the 1/8 finals of the Yugoslav Cup with Smajić being part of the team and that sealed him a move to Belgrade to play in FK Partizan. He made his senior debut with Partizan in the 1979–80 Yugoslav First League.

He played 9 consecutive seasons with Partizan, where he won 3 Yugoslav championships. Whilst at Partizan he represented Yugoslavia at the 1984 Summer Olympics in Los Angeles where they reached the semi-finals before being eliminated by France. Later, in 1987 he also debuted for the main Yugoslavia national team.

=== Period in Switzerland ===
In 1988 Smajić moved abroad to Switzerland. He signed for the Swiss Nationalliga A team Neuchâtel Xamax for the 1988–89 Nationalliga A season. Xamax had won the two previous championships. However, they failed to defend their title and could not win the championship during the time that Smajić played for them. Smajić played four and a half seasons for Xamax. They did manage to reach the final, but were runners-up of the Swiss Cup in 1990.

Together with his Xamax teammate Frédéric Chassot, Smajić joined FC Basel's first team during the winter break of their 1992–93 season under head-coach Friedel Rausch. Smajić played his domestic league debut for his new club in the home game in the St. Jakob Stadium on 7 March 1993 as Basel played a 1–1 draw with FC Wil. He scored his first goal for the club in the away game on 3 April. It was the second goal of the match as Basel won 4–1 against Locarno. However the team failed in their bid for promotion, losing precious points against the promotion rivals during the last few games of the season. Frédéric Chassot was, however, the team's top goal scorer in this stage with 9 goals and Smajić gave the most assists.

During Basel's 1993–94 season, under head-coach Claude Andrey, Smajić's teammates were the likes of Swiss international goalkeeper Stefan Huber, defenders Massimo Ceccaroni, Marco Walker and Samir Tabakovic, the midfielders Mario Cantaluppi, Martin Jeitziner and Ørjan Berg and the Swiss international strikers Dario Zuffi and Philippe Hertig. Together they won the promotion/relegation group and became Nationalliga B champions thus won promotion to the top flight of Swiss football After six seasons in the second tier.

After their promotion, Smajić stayed with Basel for another two and a half season. During his time with the club Smajić played a total of 159 games for Basel scoring a total of 30 goals. 101 of these games were in the Nationalliga B and Nationalliga A, 13 in the Swiss Cup, six in the UEFA Intertoto Cup and 29 were friendly games. He scored 12 goals in the domestic league, 5 in the Swiss Cup, one in the UIC and the other 12 were scored during the test games.

During the winter break of the 1997–98 Nationalliga A season Smajić moved to BSC Young Boys and helped them win promotion as well. He played two and a half seasons for their first team and then took up a player-manager role for their reserve team in 1998. He was sacked at the end of the season and he also retired from his playing career.

== International career ==
After representing Yugoslavia at the 1984 Olympics, Smajić later became an A international in the Yugoslavia national team. Between friendly games, and qualifiers for the 1988 UEFA European Championship, he had made 5 appearances in 1987.

Almost a decade later, and after the break-up of Yugoslavia, he became part of national team of Bosnia and Herzegovina, making two appearances in 1996. Smajić was given an emotional farewell in what was likely his last appearance for the Bosnian national team on 25 April 2000 in Sarajevo, a 0–1 result in a friendly against FIFA All Stars (Thomas Häßler, Roberto Baggio, Mustapha Hadji, Bernard Lama and Dunga, among others that made up the All Stars team).

== Managerial career ==
Throughout his managerial career, Smajić didn't manage many teams. From 1998 to 1999 he was the player-manager of BSC Young Boys, from 2001 to 2002 head coach of the Bosnia and Herzegovina U21 national team, from 2003 to 2004 manager of Yverdon-Sport FC and for a short time in 2004, from April to June, manager of FC Sion.

It wasn't until 2011 that Smajić got his next managerial duty, being the Yverdon-Sport assistant manager to Italian manager Vittorio Bevilacqua. In 2014 he came back to Sion, becoming an assistant to German manager Jochen Dries. After Dries got sacked in December 2014, Smajić took over as new manager of the Sion II team. He managed the II team until September 2015.

In June 2018, Smajić was named as the new team manager of Bosnian Premier League club Sloboda Tuzla, while Milenko Bošnjaković became the new manager of Sloboda. On 13 July 2018, only eight games before the start of the season, Smajić decided to leave Sloboda, stating that because of his back issues he needed to get a back surgery in Switzerland.

On 10 June 2019, one year after leaving Sloboda, he came back to the club and became its new team manager, signing a one-year contract. Shortly after, Mile Lazarević was announced as the new manager of Sloboda and worked alongside Smajić. On 1 October 2019, a few days after Lazarević resigned from his managerial position, Smajić also decided to resign from his position and leave Sloboda for a second time.

== Managerial statistics ==
As of 19 September 2015

Managerial record by team and tenure
Team	From	To	Record				
Team	From	To	G	W	D	L	Win %
Yverdon-Sport	July 2003	April 2004	25	8	8	9	32.00
Sion	April 2004	June 2004	7	2	2	3	28.57
Sion II	July 2015	September 2015	8	3	3	2	37.50
Total			40	13	13	14	32.50

== Honours ==
=== Player ===
Partizan

- Yugoslav First League: 1982–83, 1985–86, 1986–87

Neuchâtel Xamax

- Swiss Super Cup: 1988

Yugoslavia

- Summer Olympics Third place: 1984

== Sources ==
- Rotblau: Jahrbuch Saison 2017/2018. Publisher: FC Basel Marketing AG. ISBN 978-3-7245-2189-1
- Die ersten 125 Jahre. Publisher: Josef Zindel im Friedrich Reinhardt Verlag, Basel. ISBN 978-3-7245-2305-5
- Verein "Basler Fussballarchiv" Homepage
