= Dario Zuffi =

Swiss footballer (born 1964)

Personal information
- Full name: Dario Zuffi
- Date of birth: 7 December 1964 (age 61)
- Place of birth: Winterthur, Switzerland
- Position: Attacking midfielder

Team information
- Current team: FC Winterthur - U-21 Trainer

Youth career
- –1983: FC Töss

Senior career*
Years	Team	Apps	(Gls)
1983–1985	FC Winterthur	56	(18)
1985–1991	BSC Young Boys	186	(81)
1991–1993	FC Lugano	65	(23)
1993–1998	FC Basel	149	(37)
1998–2000	FC Winterthur	24	(6)
Total		480	(165)

International career
1986–1997	Switzerland	19	(6)

Managerial career
- 2000–2017: FC Winterthur youth
- 2013–2014: Switzerland U–21
- 2017–: FC Winterthur (assistant)
- * Club domestic league appearances and goals

Dario Zuffi (born 7 December 1964) is a Swiss football coach and former international player. He is currently employed as assistant coach for FC Winterthur.

== Career ==
=== Playing career ===
Zuffi played his youth football with the local Winterthur team FC Töss. In 1983 he moved across town to join FC Winterthur's first team and signed his first professional contract for the 1983–84 Nationalliga A season. He prolonged the contract and he played with Winterthur for two seasons before he moved on.

In the off-season before the 1985–86 Nationalliga A season Zuffi transferred to BSC Young Boys. From an early point in his career with YB, Zuffi showed tremendous skill and helped the team to win the Swiss Football Championship that season, personally scoring 15 goals. As a result of this performance, Zuffi received the 'Rookie of the Year' award during the 1985–86 season. In the 1986–87 season Zuffi and YB advanced to the final of the Swiss Cup. This was played in the Wankdorf Stadium on 8 June 1987. Zuffi scored the first goal of the game and YB went on to win 4–2 against Servette after extra time. Zuffi played six seasons for YB. In the 1988–89 season, he was joint second on the Top Scorers list with Kubilay Türkyılmaz (Bellinzona) both with 19 goals, Karl-Heinz Rummenigge (Servette FC) won the title. In the 1990–91 season, Zuffi topped the Top Scorers list with a grand total of 17 goals.

Zuffi then transferred to FC Lugano for the 1992–93 season. In this season Zuffi contributed to the team reaching the final and winning the Swiss Cup.

The following season, Zuffi moved home to the town of Oberwil and signed for FC Basel, who at that time played in the Nationalliga B, the second tier of Swiss football. Zuffi joined Basel's first team for their 1993–94 season under head-coach Claude Andrey. Zuffi was elected captain of the squad. He first played in five test games scoring seven goals, including a hat-trick in the semi-final of the Sepione Cup as Basel beat Aarau to reach the final. This was played on 17 July 1993 and Zuffi scored the only goal of the match as Basel won 1–0 against Everton.

Zuffi played his domestic league debut for his new club in the home game in the St. Jakob Stadium on 28 July 1993. He also scored his first goal for the club in the same game. It was the first goal of the game, in fact the first goal of the season in the second minute of the match. But it could not help the team, because Basel were defeated 1–2 by local rivals Old Boys. During that season his teammates were the likes of Swiss international goalkeeper Stefan Huber, defenders Massimo Ceccaroni, Marco Walker and Samir Tabakovic, the midfielders Mario Cantaluppi, Martin Jeitziner, Admir Smajić and Ørjan Berg and the Swiss international striker Philippe Hertig. Together they won the Promotion/relegation group, became Nationalliga B champions and thus won promotion to the top flight of Swiss football. This after six seasons in the second tier. Zuffi was the team's top scorer, netting 11 times in the first stage and another 11 goals during the promotion round.

Zuffi remained with FC Basel until the end of the 1997–98 Nationalliga A season. Between the years 1993 and 1998 Zuffi played a total of 220 games for Basel scoring a total of 70 goals. 149 of these games were in the Nationalliga A, 15 in the Swiss Cup, five in the UEFA Intertoto Cup and 52 were friendly games. He scored 37 goals in the domestic league, nine in the Swiss Cup, four in the Interetoto Cup and the other 19 were scored during the test games.

In 1998, Zuffi returned to the club where he launched his professional career FC Winterthur, who in the meantime had just been relegated to the 1st League, the third tier of Swiss football. He helped the club with seven goals in eleven games to their immediate return to the Nationalliga B. There he completed his last season of his active career in 1999–2000, during which he was used in all possible positions (striker, midfielder, libero). He then retired from professional soccer.

=== International career ===
In addition to his club career, Zuffi also scored 19 caps for the Switzerland national football team.

=== Managerial career ===
Since the end of his active playing career, Zuffi is employed as coach for FC Winterthur. First from 2000 to 2002 he looked after the U–12 youth team. Then from 2002 to 2004 he was coach for the U–16 team. From 2003 he was also coach of the U–21 team, with whom he achieved promotion to the then third-tier division and he was in this position until 2017, with an interruption between 2011 and 2014.

In addition to this, on various occasions he was required supervisor for their 1st team. From 2008 to 2009 he worked as an assistant under head-coach Mathias Walther for the first team. For the last two games of the FCW season 2015–16 he was ad-interim coach of the first team together with Umberto Romano and he has again performed the same interim function again from February to June 2017. Since 2017 he is assistant to first team head-coach Ralf Loose.

From January 2013 to September 2014 Zuffi was also the assistant coach of the Swiss U-21 national team in addition to his position for his club.

== Personal life ==
Zuffi has three sons, Sandro, Luca, and Nico. Luca Zuffi plays for FC Basel, Sandro and Nico play for SC Young Fellows Juventus in Zürich.

== Titles and honours ==
Young Boys

- Nationalliga A: 1985–86
- Swiss Cup: 1986–87
- Swiss Super Cup: 1986
- Swiss Football Championship top scorer: 1991

Lugano

- Swiss Cup: 1992–93

Basel

- Nationalliga B: 1993–94

== Sources ==
- Rotblau: Jahrbuch Saison 2017/2018. Publisher: FC Basel Marketing AG. ISBN 978-3-7245-2189-1
- Die ersten 125 Jahre. Publisher: Josef Zindel im Friedrich Reinhardt Verlag, Basel. ISBN 978-3-7245-2305-5
- Verein "Basler Fussballarchiv" Homepage
