= Samir Tabaković =

Bosnian footballer (born 1967)

Personal information
- Date of birth: 24 October 1967 (age 59)
- Place of birth: Višegrad, Bosnia, FR Yugoslavia
- Position: Defender

Senior career*
Years	Team	Apps	(Gls)
1990–1991	Sloboda Tuzla	27	(0)
1992–1994	Belišće	35	(2)
1994–1997	FC Basel	99	(1)
1997–1998	Waldhof Mannheim	12	(0)
1998–1999	FC Basel	0	(0)
1999–2000	Schaffhausen	20	(0)
2000–2002	Wangen bei Olten	23+	(3+)
Total		216	(6)

Managerial career
- 2011–2015: FC Black Stars Basel
- 2015–2016: BSC Old Boys
- 2017–: FC Black Stars Basel
- * Club domestic league appearances and goals

Samir Tabaković (born 24 October 1967) is a Bosnian football manager and former player.

== Playing career ==
Tabaković played one season for Sloboda Tuzla and one and a half seasons for NK Belišće before moving to Switzerland.

Tabaković joined FC Basel's first team during the winter break of their 1993–94 season under head-coach Claude Andrey. After playing in four test games Tabaković played his debut for his new club in the Swiss Cup in the home game in the St. Jakob Stadium on 12 February 1994 as Basel won 1–0 against Xamax. He played his domestic league debut for the club one week later in the home game on 20 February as Basel won 1–0 against Kriens.

During this season his team mates were the likes of Swiss international goalkeeper Stefan Huber, defenders Massimo Ceccaroni, Marco Walker and Reto Baumgartner, the midfielders Mario Cantaluppi, Martin Jeitziner, Admir Smajić and Ørjan Berg and the Swiss international striker Dario Zuffi. Together they won the promotion/relegation group and as Nationalliga B champions thus won promotion to the top flight of Swiss football, after six seasons in the second tier.

Tabaković scored his first goal for his club in the away game on 29 April 1995. But it could not save the team, as Basel were defeated 4–1 by Lugano. In the 1997–98 Nationalliga A season, also because of a troubling injury, Tabaković was not getting much playing time, so the club loaned him to German club Waldhof Mannheim who played in the Regionalliga for the second half of the season. Again after returning to Basel, Tabaković could not obtain a place in the team and in the winter break of the 1998–1999 he left the club.

In the seven seasons with the club, Tabaković played a total of 161 games for Basel scoring a total of two goals. 99 of these games were in the Nationalliga A, ten in the Swiss Cup, eight in the UEFA Intertoto Cup and 44 were friendly games. He scored one goal in the domestic league and the other was scored during the Swiss Cup game on 21 March 1996 as Basel won 4–1 against Biel-Bienne.

Following his time with Basel Tabaković moved on to play one year for FC Schaffhausen. He then moved to FC Wangen bei Olten during the winter break of the 1999–2000 season and they won the 1st League group 2 and qualified for the promotion play-offs. They won the first round 5–2 on aggregate against FC Meyrin and in the second round 3–2 on aggregate against Zug 94. But they were relegated the following season. Tabaković stayed with the club another season and then retired from active playing.

== Managerial career ==
Tabaković obtained his training certificates and in 2011 was appointed as head-coach for FC Black Stars Basel in the third highest tier of Swiss football. He was head-coach of BSC Old Boys in the 2015–16 season. In 2017 he returned to Black Stars.

== Personal life ==
Born in Bosnia-Herzegovina, Tabaković also has Swiss citizenship.

== Sources ==
- Rotblau: Jahrbuch Saison 2017/2018. Publisher: FC Basel Marketing AG. ISBN 978-3-7245-2189-1
- Die ersten 125 Jahre. Publisher: Josef Zindel im Friedrich Reinhardt Verlag, Basel. ISBN 978-3-7245-2305-5
- Verein "Basler Fussballarchiv" Homepage
