= Mario Cantaluppi =

Swiss footballer (born 1974)

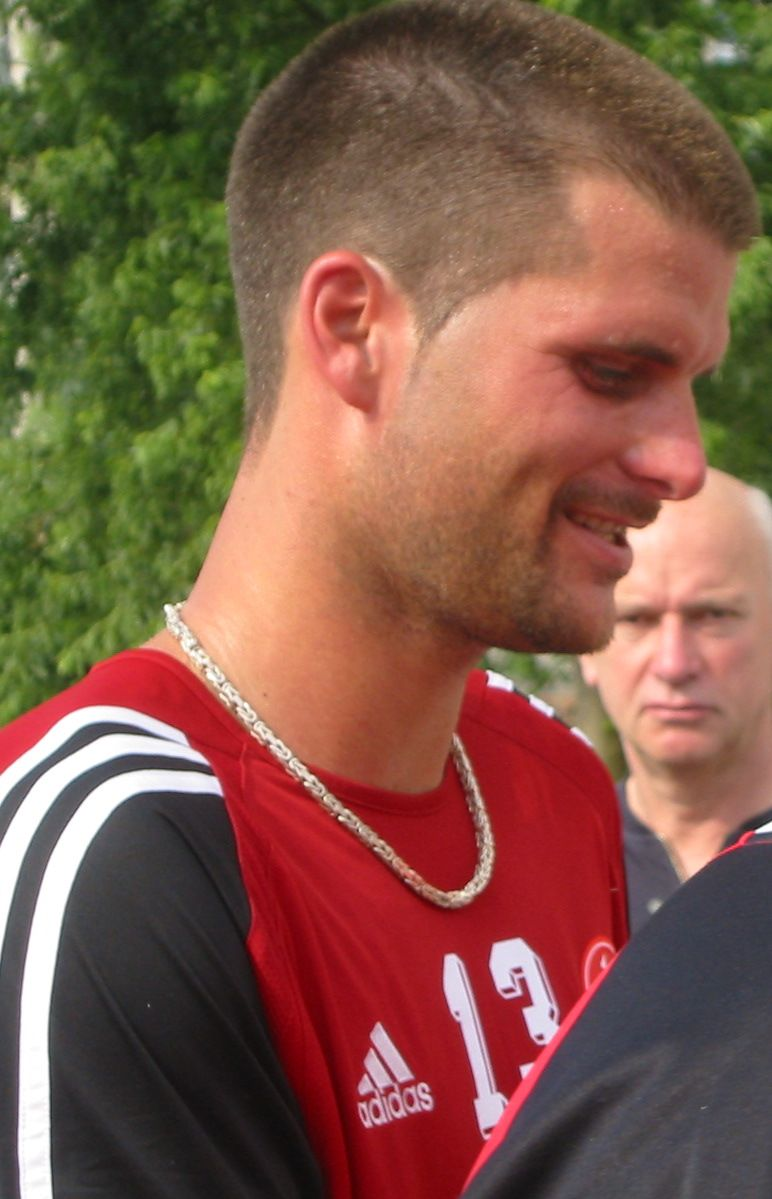
- Cantaluppi with 1. FC Nürnberg

Personal information
- Date of birth: 11 April 1974 (age 52)
- Place of birth: Schlieren, Switzerland
- Height: 1.84 m (6 ft 0 in)
- Positions: Defender; midfielder

Youth career
- 1982–1990: Grasshoppers

Senior career*
Years	Team	Apps	(Gls)
1990–1993	Grasshoppers	49	(3)
1993–1996	Basel	89	(8)
1996–1998	Servette	46	(4)
1999–2004	Basel	145	(14)
2004–2006	1. FC Nürnberg	58	(0)
2006–2007	FC Luzern	47	(7)
2008–2009	Sint-Truidense	49	(5)
2010	SC Buochs	17	(1)
Total		500	(42)

International career
1997–2004	Switzerland	23	(4)

Managerial career
- 2010–2011: SC Buochs
- 2012–2013: SC Dornach
- 2014: Servette (caretaker)
- * Club domestic league appearances and goals

Mario "Lupo" Cantaluppi (born 11 April 1974) is a Swiss former professional footballer who played as a defender or midfielder.

== Club career ==
Born in Schlieren, Switzerland, Mario Cantaluppi started his professional career with Grasshopper Club Zürich in 1990 and won the 1990–91 Nationaliga A in his debut season.

In 1993, he dropped down a division to sign for FC Basel who were playing in the Nationalliga B at the time. He signed the contract and joined the team under head-coach Claude Andrey. After playing in three test games, Cantaluppi played his domestic league debut for his new club in the home game in the St. Jakob Stadium on 28 July 1993 as Basel were defeated 1–2 by local rivals Old Boys. He scored his first goal for his club in the away game in La Blancherie on 14 August. It was the last goal of the match as Basel won 3–0 against SR Delémont.

During that season, his team mates were the likes of Swiss international goalkeeper Stefan Huber, defenders Massimo Ceccaroni, Marco Walker and Samir Tabakovic, the midfielders Reto Baumgartner, Martin Jeitziner, Admir Smajić and Ørjan Berg and the Swiss international strikers Dario Zuffi and Philippe Hertig. Together they won the promotion/relegation group and became Nationalliga B champions and thus won promotion to the top flight of Swiss football. This after six seasons in the second tier.

In the summer of 1996 he signed for Servette FC, but rejoined Basel three years later. He joined German Bundesliga club 1. FC Nürnberg in 2004 and played there for the next two seasons before returning to Switzerland to play for FC Luzern. In January 2008, he joined Belgium's K. Sint-Truidense V.V. and played there until summer 2009. In 2010, he was for about five months player-manager of SC Buochs.

== International career ==
Cantaluppi made 23 appearance for the Switzerland national team. He helped Switzerland qualify for UEFA Euro 2004 but was left out of the final squad for the tournament after falling out with national coach Köbi Kuhn. Cantaluppi never played for Switzerland afterwards.
