= Stefan Huber =

Swiss footballer (born 1966)

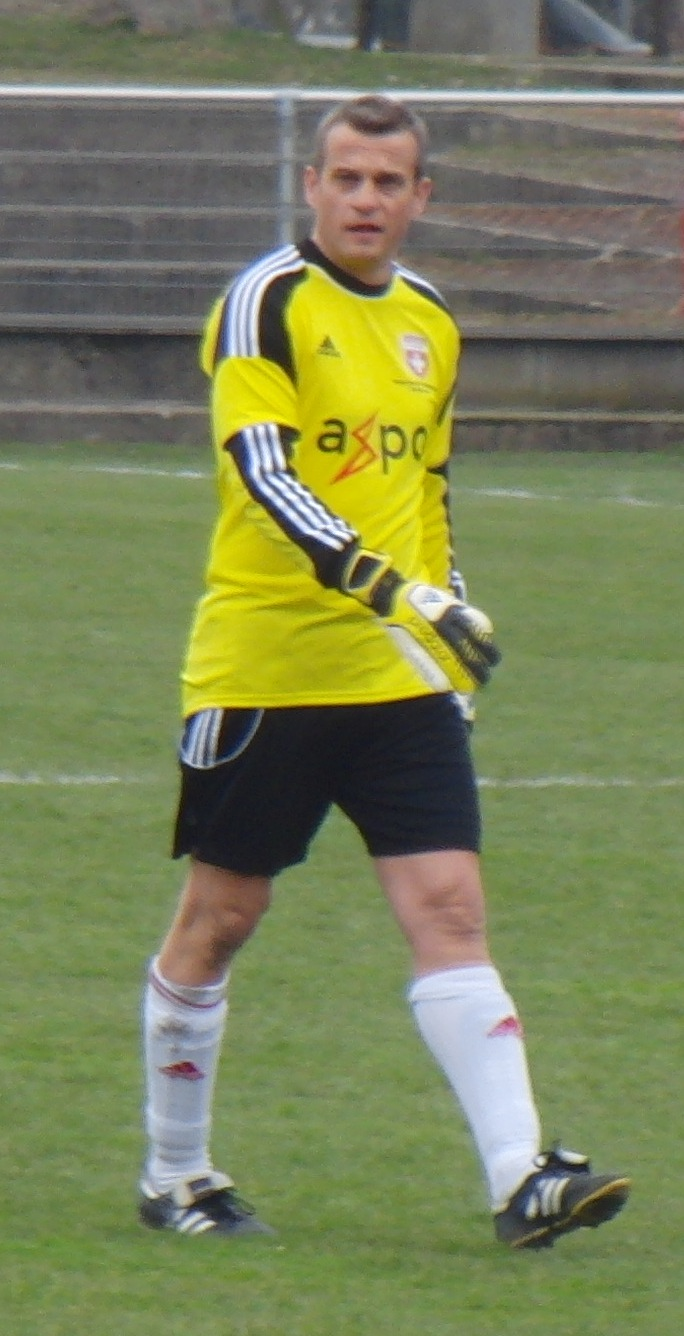
- Huber in 2013

Personal information
- Date of birth: 14 June 1966 (age 60)
- Place of birth: Switzerland
- Height: 1.82 m (6 ft 0 in)
- Position: Goalkeeper

Youth career
- FC Unterstrass
- Grasshoppers

Senior career*
Years	Team	Apps	(Gls)
1984–1988	Grasshoppers	0	(0)
1988–1993	Lausanne-Sport	115	(0)
1993–1999	FC Basel	185	(0)
1999–2002	Grasshoppers	53	(0)

International career
1991–1999	Switzerland	16	(0)

Managerial career
- 2005–2007: Grasshoppers
- * Club domestic league appearances and goals

Stefan Huber (born 14 June 1966) is a Swiss former professional footballer who played as a goalkeeper during the 1980s, 1990s and early 2000s.

== Club career ==
Huber played his youth football for the local club FC Unterstrass. He then moved to Grasshoppers and began his professional career with them in 1984 under head-coach Miroslav Blažević. Four years later, he then moved to Lausanne-Sport under manager Radu Nunweiller. He played there for five years, to start with as first-choice keeper, but then in the season 1992–93 Fabrice Borer transferred in and took over.

Therefore, Huber moved on and joined FC Basel's first team for their 1993–94 season under head-coach Claude Andrey. After playing in four test games, Huber played his domestic league debut for the club in the home game in the St. Jakob Stadium on 28 July 1993 Basel as were defeated 2–1 by local rivals Old Boys. During that season his teammates were the likes of the defenders Massimo Ceccaroni, Marco Walker and Samir Tabakovic, the midfielders Mario Cantaluppi, Martin Jeitziner, Admir Smajić and Ørjan Berg and the Swiss international strikers Dario Zuffi and Philippe Hertig. Together they won the promotion/relegation group and became Nationalliga B champions and thus won promotion to the top flight of Swiss football. This is after six seasons in the second tier.

He stayed with the club for six years, and during this time, Huber played a total of 263 games for Basel. 185 of these games were in the Nationalliga and Nationalliga A, 16 in the Swiss Cup, seven in the UEFA Intertoto Cup and 55 were friendly games.

Huber returned to Grasshoppers in 1999 as the two clubs made a goalkeeper swap with Pascal Zuberbühler. Huber retired from active football in 2002. After retiring from playing, he became Grasshopper's goalkeeping coach from 2005 until 2007.

== International career ==
Stefan Huber also played 16 times for the Switzerland national team between 1991 and 1999.

== Sources ==
- Rotblau: Jahrbuch Saison 2017/2018. Publisher: FC Basel Marketing AG. ISBN 978-3-7245-2189-1
- Die ersten 125 Jahre. Publisher: Josef Zindel im Friedrich Reinhardt Verlag, Basel. ISBN 978-3-7245-2305-5
- Verein "Basler Fussballarchiv" Homepage
