= Marco Walker =

Swiss footballer and manager (born 1970)

Personal information
- Date of birth: 2 May 1970 (age 56)
- Place of birth: Solothurn, Switzerland
- Height: 1.89 m (6 ft 2 in)
- Position: Defender

Youth career
- –1983: FC Bellach
- 1983–: FC Solothurn
- FC Grenchen
- –1988: FC Bellach

Senior career*
Years	Team	Apps	(Gls)
1988–1990	FC Grenchen	49	(4)
1990–1992	FC Lugano	42	(1)
1992–1996	Basel	110	(10)
1996–1998	1860 Munich	53	(3)
1998–2000	Tennis Borussia Berlin	55	(5)
2000–2002	St. Gallen	18	(2)
2002–2004	Aarau	23	(2)
2004–2005	Mainz 05	17	(0)
2005–2006	Old Boys	10	(0)
Total		344	(22)

International career
1995–1997	Switzerland	10	(0)

Managerial career
- 2005–2008: Basel (U18 assistant)
- 2007–2008: Concordia Basel (assistant)
- 2008–2014: Basel (assistant)
- 2015: Biel-Bienne (assistant)
- 2015–2018: Basel (assistant)
- 2018: Aarau (assistant)
- 2019: Old Boys
- 2019–2021: FC Naters
- 2021: FC Sion
- 2022: FC Basel
- * Club domestic league appearances and goals

Marco Walker (born 2 May 1970) is a Swiss football manager and a former international who played as a defender during the 1980s, 1990s and 2000s.

== Club career ==
Walker started his youth football with local club FC Bellach. From 1983 with he was with FC Solothurn, FC Grenchen, again Solothurn and Bettlach, before signing his first professional contract in 1988 with FC Grenchen in the second tier of Swiss football. He played for Grenchen for two seasons before moving on again. During the pre-season to the 1990–91 Nationalliga A Walker signed for FC Lugano one division higher. Walker also played two seasons for Lugano.

Walker joined FC Basel's first team for their 1992–93 season under head-coach Friedel Rausch. After playing in four test games Walker played his domestic league debut for his new club in the opening match of the season, an away game on 18 July 1992 as Basel were defeated 0–1 by Grenchen. Due to injuries Walker only played 16 domestic league games in that season.

The following season Walker was a regular in the starting eleven. He scored his first goal for his club on 28 August 1993 in the home game in the St. Jakob Stadium as Basel won 2–0 against CS Chênois. During Basel's 1993–94 season his team mates were the likes of Swiss international goalkeeper Stefan Huber, defenders Massimo Ceccaroni, Reto Baumgartner and Samir Tabakovic, the midfielders Mario Cantaluppi, Martin Jeitziner, Admir Smajić and Ørjan Berg and the Swiss international striker Dario Zuffi. Together they won the promotion/relegation group and as Nationalliga B champions thus won promotion to the top flight of Swiss football, after six seasons in the second tier.

Walker stayed with the club another two seasons after their promotion. Between the years 1992 and 1996 Walker played a total of 170 games for Basel scoring a total of 15 goals. 110 of these games were in the Nationalliga A, 10 in the Swiss Cup, three in the UEFA Intertoto Cup and 47 were friendly games. He scored 10 goals in the domestic league, one in the cup and the other four were scored during the test games.

There after, followed a move to the Bundesliga to TSV 1860 Munich in 1996. He played for 1860 for two seasons, playing 53 games in the 1. Bundesliga usually in the starting formation. He then moved on to Tennis Borussia Berlin in 1998, who at that time played in the 2. Bundesliga. Walker was a regular starter for Tennis Borussia as well, making 55 appearances in his two seasons.

Then Walker returned to the Nationalliga A with FC St. Gallen in 2000. He played his debut for them on 12 August 2000 in the 1–2 defeat in Stade de la Maladière (1924) against Xamax. But injuries stopped Walker's progress. After a herniated disc, he was not able to play a match from September 2000 to March 2001. Even after becoming fit again, he was by no means a first-team regular, playing just eight games in his first season and ten in his second. Therefore, Walker signed for FC Aarau in 2002 and here he never became a regular either. He went back to Germany in January 2004 with 1. FSV Mainz 05 but he struggled there as well. He played 17 games for Mainz in the first team and ten for the reserves. He then returned to Switzerland, ended his professional career and played for amateur club Old Boys from 2005 until 2006 and then he retired from active football completely.

Or nearly completely, while he was assistant trainer with FC Basel under head-coach Thorsten Fink in the friendly match on 27 April 2011 he was transferred in by his boss to replace Granit Xhaka who had injured himself. Basel were leading by one goal to nil at that moment, but the match ended with a 1–1 draw.

== International career ==
In 1995, Walker's good form for FC Basel earned him a call-up to the Swiss national team. He made his national debut in the European Championship qualifier against Turkey on 25 April 1995. The match ended with a 1–2 defeat. Between June 1996 and November 1997 he played another nine games for his country.

== Coaching career ==
From 2005 to 2008 he worked as an assistant manager of FC Basel's U18 squad. In 2007, he became assistant manager at FC Concordia Basel alongside his job at FC Basel where he worked as a fitness coach in various FCB junior teams. But on 16 January 2009, he was appointed as Christian Gross' assistant at FC Basel. Gross was sacked soon after, however, and Thorsten Fink replaced him. Walker then became fitness coach and was still a part of the first team staff.

In July 2014, he was appointed as talentmanager for FC Basel. He worked in this position for one year, before he in July 2015 became assistant manager of FC Biel-Bienne. But as Urs Fischer was appointed as Basel first team manager, Walker returned to the club as his assistant.

On 18 May 2018 it was announced, that Walker would be the assistant manager of FC Aarau for the 2018/19 season. Walker decided to resign for personal reasons already on 10 September 2018.

On 21 March 2019, he was appointed as manager of BSC Old Boys.

In the summer, in advance to the 2020–21 season Walker was appointed as head-coach for FC Naters.

On 16 March 2021 he was hired by FC Sion. He was fired by Sion on 7 October 2021 after a 2–6 loss to Zürich. Sion only achieved two ties in the last 5 games under Walker's helm and allowed 15 goals in those games.

On 21 February 2022, he was announced as assistant coach of brand new FC Basel coach Guille Abascal, replacing Boris Smiljanic.

== Sources ==
- W for Walker on FCSG-Data homepage
- Die ersten 125 Jahre. Publisher: Josef Zindel im Friedrich Reinhardt Verlag, Basel. ISBN 978-3-7245-2305-5
- Verein "Basler Fussballarchiv" Homepage
