= 1992–93 FC Aarau season =

FC Aarau
1992–93 season
- Club president: Ernst Lämmli
- Head coach: Rolf Fringer
- Stadium: Stadion Brügglifeld, Aarau
- 1992–93 NLA Qualifying: 5th of 12
- Championship group: 1st of 8
- 1992–93 Swiss Cup: Round 4
- Top goalscorer: League: Petar Alexandrov (19); All: Petar Alexandrov (21)

The 1992–93 season was FC Aarau's 90th season in their existence, since their foundation in 1902. It was their eleventh season in the top flight of Swiss football, following their promotion at the end of 1980–81 season. FCA played their home games in the Stadion Brügglifeld and the stadium is located on the southern outskirts of Aarau, in the territory of the neighboring municipality of Suhr. It is about one and a half kilometers from Aarau city center and the railway station.

== Overview ==
Since the AGM in 1989 the local businessman Ernst Lämmli was the club's chairman and patron. Lämmli was an architect and ran his own architectural firm. As co-coach Alfred Strasser and player-coach Roger Wehrli both left the club, Lämmli had appointed Rolf Fringer as new head coach.

The FCA first team competed in this season's domestic first-tier 1992–93 Nationalliga A with the clear intention of reaching the championship group, which would mean finishing the qualifying stage under the top eight. The team had not achieved this in the past five seasons. The team also competed in 1991–92 Swiss Cup. They had not qualified for any of the UEFA European tournaments and they did not enter the Intertoto Cup.

As it came to the winter-break, the team had achieved the club's primary intention of reaching the championship group and thus avoiding the relegation places. The club then revised their aim and now wanted to aim for the UEFA cup places, which meant they had to finish within the top three. At the end of the season FCA first team won the championship- After their championship titles in 1911–12 and 1913–14, this was the clubs third championship win and they had qualified for the 1993–94 UEFA Champions League preliminary round.

== Players ==
The following is the list of the FCA first team squad this season. It also includes players that were in the squad the day the domestic league season started, on 18 July 1992, but subsequently left the club after that date.

Note: Flags indicate national team as defined under FIFA eligibility rules; some limited exceptions apply. Players may hold more than one non-FIFA nationality.

No.	Pos.	Nation	Player
1	GK	SUI	Andreas Hilfiker (league games: 35)
—	GK	SUI	Walter Müller (league games: 1)
—	DF	SUI	David Bader (league games: 30)
—	DF	SUI	René Fluri (league games: 16)
—	DF	SUI	Beat Huber (league games: 2)
—	DF	SUI	Bernd Kilian (league games: 32)
—	DF	CRO	Mirko Pavličević (league games: 33)
—	DF	ITA	Salvatore Romano (league games: 25)
—	DF	SUI	Daniel Rupf (league games: 10)
—	DF	SUI	Daniel Wyss (league games: 27)

No.	Pos.	Nation	Player
—	MF	SUI	Roberto Di Matteo (league games: 32)
—	MF	SUI	Andreas Häsler (league games: 16)
—	MF	SUI	Marcel Heldmann (league games: 33)
—	MF	SUI	Rolf Meier (league games: 20)
—	MF	SUI	Reto Rossi (league games: 26)
—	MF	GER	Sascha Stauch (league games: 1)
—	MF	SUI	René Sutter (league games: 36)
—	FW	BUL	Petar Alexandrov (league games: 31)
—	FW	POL	Ryszard Komornicki (league games: 33)
—	FW	LUX	Jeff Saibene (league games: 7)
—	FW	GER	Uwe Wassmer (league games: 17)

Players who left the squad

The following is the list of the FCZ first team players that left the squad during the previous season or in the off-season, before the new domestic season began.

Note: Flags indicate national team as defined under FIFA eligibility rules; some limited exceptions apply. Players may hold more than one non-FIFA nationality.

No.	Pos.	Nation	Player
—	GK	SUI	Niels Hochuli
—	DF	SUI	Adrian Aebi (to Grenchen)
—	DF	SUI	Rico Juchli
—	DF	SUI	Heribert Koch (to St. Gallen)
—	DF	SUI	Giuseppe Longa
—	MF	SUI	Daniel Chèvre

No.	Pos.	Nation	Player
—	FW	SUI	Farzad Ghadamian
—	FW	SUI	Andreas Hediger (to FC Sursee)
—	FW	FIN	Mika Lipponen (to TPS)
—	FW	SUI	Martin Müller (retired)
—	FW	SUI	Roland Müller
—	FW	SUI	Frank Triebold (to Kriens)
—	FW	SUI	Roger Wehrli (to FC Suhr)

== Results ==
Legend

Win Draw Loss Postponed

=== Nationalliga A ===
==== Qualification phase ====
The first stage of the NLA began on 18 July 1992 and was completed on 6 December. The top eight teams in the qualification phase would advance to the championship group and the last four teams would play against relegation.

18 July 1992 Round 1	Chiasso	1–1	Aarau	Stadio Comunale Riva IV, Chiasso
20:00	Junior Da Silva (72 pen. 1:1)	FCA summary	29' (1:0) Heldmann; (yellow card) Rossi; (yellow card) Di Matteo	Attendance: 2,485; Referee: (Switzerland) Andreas Weber (Bern)

21 July 1992 Round 2	Aarau	1–1	Young Boys	Stadion Altenburg, Wettingen
20:00	Alexandrov 90+1' (1:1); Kilian (yellow card); Sutter (yellow card); Di Matteo (yellow card)	FCA summary	30' (pen.) Bregy; (yellow card) Streun	Attendance: 3,200; Referee: (Switzerland) Erwin Schuler
Note: Due renewal works, the Stadion Brügglifeld was closed, therefore the venue moved to Wettingen.

25 July 1992 Round 3	Grasshopper Club	2–3	Aarau	Letzigrund, Zürich
20:00	Gämperle 10' (1:0); Élber 76' (2:3); Sforza (yellow card)	FCA summary	15' (1:1) Komornicki; 47' (1:2) Heldmann; 60' (1:3) Kilian	Attendance: 4,500; Referee: (Switzerland) Andreas Schluchter (Schönenbuch)
Note: Due to works the Hardturm was closed. The venue was moved to the Letzigrund.

31 July 1992 Round 4	FC Bulle	1–3	Aarau	Stade de Bouleyres, Bulle
20:00	Eberhard 12' (1:0) (yellow card)	FCA summary	23' (1:1) Alexandrov; 43' (1:2) Heldmann; 84' (1:3) Alexandrov; (yellow card) Heldmann; (yellow card) Kilian; (yellow card) Pavličević; (yellow card) Fluri; (yellow card) Di Matteo	Attendance: 2,800; Referee: (Switzerland) Pierre-Alain Vuillemin (Geneva)

9 August 1992 Round 5	St. Gallen	1–4	Aarau	Espenmoos, St. Gallen
17:30	Hurtado 60' (1:2); Irizik (yellow card) (yellow-red card) 66'	FCA summary	Kilian 38' (0:1); Saibene 55' (0:2); Fluri 82' (1:3); Alexandrov 89' (1:4); (yellow card) Wassmer; (yellow card) Romano	Attendance: 4,500; Referee: (Switzerland) Jürg Herrmann (Hinterkapplen (Wohlen bei Bern))

11 August 1992 Round 6	Aarau	1–1	Sion	Stadion Brügglifeld, Aarau
20:00	Alexandrov 84' (1:1); Rossi (yellow card)	FCA summary	40' (0:1) Hottiger; (yellow card) (yellow-red card) 55' Hottiger; (yellow card) Herr	Attendance: 7,200; Referee: (Switzerland) Francesco Bianchi (Chiasso)

18 August 1992 Round 7	Aarau	1–1	Zürich	Stadion Brügglifeld, Aarau
20:00	Fluri (yellow card) 47'; Sutter 83' (1:1)	FCZ summary FCA summary	(yellow card) 63' Baljić; (yellow card) 65' Mazzarelli; 66' (0:1) Baljić; (yellow card) 70' Kägi	Attendance: 5,900; Referee: (Switzerland) Strässle (Steinach)

22 August 1992 Round 8	Servette	3–0	Aarau	Stade de la Fontenette, Carouge
20:00	Anderson 3' (1:0); Anderson 71' (2:0); Aeby 90+4' (3:0)	FCA summary	(yellow card) Komornicki; (yellow card) Heldmann; (yellow card) Pavličević; (yellow card) Di Matteo	Attendance: 6,100; Referee: (Switzerland) Francis Fischer (Arch)
Note: Charmilles Stadium was otherwise used, venue changed to Carouge.

29 August 1992 Round 9	Lugano	P–P	Aarau	Cornaredo, Lugano
		[ FCA summary]

2 September 1992 Round 10	Aarau	2–1	Xamax	Stadion Brügglifeld, Aarau
20:00	Heldmann 38' (1:0); Komornicki 42' (2:0)	FCA summary	78' (2:1) Manfreda	Attendance: 5,100; Referee: (Switzerland) Claude Detruche (Thônex)
Note: Fair game, no yellow cards

5 September 1992 Round 9	Lugano	4–1	Aarau	Cornaredo, Lugano
20:00	Sylvestre 6' (1:0); Pelosi 32' (2:0); Käslin 41' (3:0); Zuffi 65' (4:0)	FCA summary	90+1' Fluri	Attendance: 3,400; Referee: (Switzerland) Erwin Fölmli
Note: The game was originally scheduled for 29 August, but was posponed and then rescheduled. Fair game, no cautions.

12 September 1992 Round 11	Lausanne-Sport	3–0	Aarau	Olympique de la Pontaise, Lausanne
20:00	Fink 23' (1:0); Badea 28' (2:0); Olaru 48' (3:0); Raschle (yellow card)	FCA summary	(yellow card) Heldmann; (yellow card) Pavličević; (yellow card) Rupf; (yellow card) Kilian	Attendance: 5,500; Referee: (Switzerland) Kurt Zuppinger (Bremgarten, Aargau)

19 September 1992 Round 12	Aarau	2–1	Chiasso	Stadion Brügglifeld, Aarau
20:00	Saibene 7' (1:0); Romano 64' (2:1); Alexandrov (yellow card); Komornicki (yellow card)	FCA summary	36' (1:1) Paradiso	Attendance: 4,300; Referee: (Switzerland) Michel Zen-Ruffinen

26 September 1992 Round 13	Young Boys	2–0	Aarau	Wankdorf Stadium, Bern
17:30	Streun 31' (1:0); Christensen 90+1' (2:0); Baumann (yellow card)	FCA summary	(yellow card) Heldmann	Attendance: 5,000; Referee: (Switzerland) Pierre-Alain Vuillemin (Geneva)

7 October 1992 Round 14	Aarau	0–1	Grasshopper Club	Stadion Brügglifeld, Aarau
20:00		FCA summary	54' (0:1) Vega	Attendance: 6,400; Referee: (Switzerland) Serge Muhmenthaler (Grenchen)
Note: Fair game, no cautions

17 October 1992 Round 15	Aarau	1–0	Bulle	Stadion Brügglifeld, Aarau
20:00	Alexandrov 12' (1:0); Romano (yellow card); Pavličević (yellow card)	FCA summary	(yellow card) Rudakov	Attendance: 2,100; Referee: (Switzerland) Francis Fischer (Arch)

24 October 1992 Round 16	Aarau	3–2	St. Gallen	Stadion Brügglifeld, Aarau
20:00	Romano 33' (1:0); Bader 34' (2:0); Alexandrov 89' (3:2); Rupf (yellow card)	FCA summary	51' (2:1) Ratinho; 57' (2:2) Hurtado; (yellow card) Hengartner; (yellow card) Fischer	Attendance: 2,900; Referee: (Switzerland) Peter Kellenberger

31 October 1992 Round 17	Sion	0–0	Aarau	Stade Tourbillon, Sion
20:00		FCA summary		Attendance: 6,000; Referee: (Switzerland) Gottfried Friedrich (Seedorf, Uri)
Note: Fair game, no cautions.

8 November 1992 Round 18	Zürich	2–0	Aarau	Letzigrund, Zürich
14:30	Sesa (yellow card) 4'; Grassi 47' (1:0); Sesa 90+2'	FCZ summary FCA summary	(yellow card) 16' Rupf; (yellow card) 52' Di Matteo; (yellow card) 90+1' Pavličević	Attendance: 5,300; Referee: (Switzerland) Daniel Roduit (Sion)

14 November 1992 Round 19	Aarau	2–0	Servette	Stadion Brügglifeld, Aarau
17:30	Ratinho 3' (1:0); Heldmann 24' (2:0)	FCA summary	(yellow card) Schepull	Attendance: 4,400; Referee: (Switzerland) Gottfried Friedrich (Seedorf, Uri)

22 November 1992 Round 20	Aarau	P–P	Lugano	Stadion Brügglifeld, Aarau
		FCA summary

24 November 1992 Round 20	Aarau	3–1	Lugano	Stadion Brügglifeld, Aarau
19:00	Komornicki 14' (1:0); Alexandrov 38' (2:0); Alexandrov 45' (3:0)	FCA summary	53' (3:1) Galvão	Attendance: 4,800; Referee: (Switzerland) Willy Hänni, (Cugy)
Note: Game was originally scheduled for Sunday 22 November, but was posponed and rescheduled for two days later.

29 September 1992 Round 21	Xamax	5–1	Aarau	Stade de la Maladière, Neuchâtel
14:30	Manfreda 7' (1:0); Manfreda 17' (pen.); Fernandez 45' (pen.); Bonvin 48' (4:1); Ramzy 69' (5:1)	FCA summary	39' (2:1) Alexandrov; (yellow card) Sutter	Attendance: 12,200; Referee: (Switzerland) Arturo Martino (Neukirch an der Thur)

6 September 1992 Round 22	Aarau	1–1	Lausanne-Sport	Stadion Brügglifeld, Aarau
14:30	Romano 70' (1:1)	FCA summary	53' (0:1) La Placa	Attendance: 4,000; Referee: (Switzerland) Michel Zen-Ruffinen
Note: Fair game, no cautions.

==== Qualification table ====
Pos	Team	Pld	W	D	L	GF	GA	GD	Pts	Qualification
1	Young Boys	22	11	6	5	44	30	+14	28	Advance to championship round halved points (rounded up) as bonus
2	Servette	22	10	7	5	32	18	+14	27	Advance to championship round halved points (rounded up) as bonus
3	Sion	22	8	10	4	28	21	+7	26	Advance to championship round halved points (rounded up) as bonus
4	Lausanne-Sport	22	7	10	5	28	21	+7	24	Advance to championship round halved points (rounded up) as bonus
5	Aarau	22	9	6	7	30	34	−4	24	Advance to championship round halved points (rounded up) as bonus
6	Zürich	22	8	7	7	21	22	−1	23	Advance to championship round halved points (rounded up) as bonus
7	Xamax	22	6	10	6	30	26	+4	22	Advance to championship round halved points (rounded up) as bonus
8	Lugano	22	7	8	7	29	28	+1	22	Advance to championship round halved points (rounded up) as bonus
9	Grasshopper Club	22	5	11	6	27	27	0	21	Continue to promotion/relegation round
10	St. Gallen	22	4	10	8	21	28	−7	18	Continue to promotion/relegation round
11	Chiasso	22	5	6	11	15	26	−11	16	Continue to promotion/relegation round
12	Bulle	22	4	5	13	18	42	−24	13	Continue to promotion/relegation round

Source: rsssf.com
Rules for classification: 1) Points; 2) Goal difference; 3) Goals scored; 4) Head-to-head points; 5) Away goals scored; 6) Draw.

==== Championship group ====
The first eight teams of the qualification phase competed in the Championship round. The teams took half of the points (rounded up to complete units) gained in the qualification as bonus with them. The championship group began on 28 February 1993 and was completed on 12 June.

28 February 1993 Round 1	Servette	0–2	Aarau	Charmilles Stadium, Geneva
14:30		FCA summary	6' (0:1) Alexandrov; 61' (0:2) Wyss	Attendance: 4,800; Referee: (Switzerland) Francesco Bianchi (Chiasso)
Note: Fair game, no cautions.

7 March 1993 Round 2	Aarau	1–1	Lugano	Stadion Brügglifeld, Aarau
14:30	Di Matteo 68' (1:1); Sutter (yellow card)	FCA summary	53' (0:1) Zuffi; (yellow card) Tami; (yellow card) Galvão	Attendance: 5,300; Referee: (Switzerland) Freddy Philippoz (Sion)

14 March 1993 Round 3	Sion	0–1	Aarau	Stade Tourbillon, Sion
14:30		FCA summary	20' (0:1) Alexandrov	Attendance: 7,300; Referee: (Switzerland) Serge Muhmenthaler (Grenchen)
Note: Fair game, no cautions.

24 March 1993 Round 4	Aarau	2–0	Young Boys	Stadion Brügglifeld, Aarau
20:00	Komornicki 18' (1:0); Alexandrov 54' (2:0); Wyss (yellow card)	FCA summary	(yellow card) Moser	Attendance: 4,800; Referee: (Switzerland) Serge Muhmenthaler (Grenchen)

3 April 1993 Round 5	Lausanne-Sport	2–1	Aarau	Olympique de la Pontaise, Lausanne
20:00	Béguin 26' (1:0); Fink 69' (2:1); Fink (yellow card); Béguin (yellow card)	FCA summary	48' (1:1) Wassmer; (red card) 78' Alexandrov; (yellow card) Wassmer; (yellow card) Wyss; (yellow card) Heldmann	Attendance: 4,500; Referee: (Switzerland) Freddy Philippoz (Sion)

10 April 1993 Round 6	Aarau	1–0	Xamax	Stadion Brügglifeld, Aarau
17:00	Rossi 17' (1:0)	FCA summary		Attendance: 3,700; Referee: (Switzerland) Daniel Roduit (Sion)
Note: Fair game, no cautions.

24 April 1993 Round 7	Zürich	0–0	Aarau	Letzigrund, Zürich
20:00	Widmer (yellow card) 15'	FCZ summary FCA summary	(yellow card) 26' Bader; (yellow card) 31' Heldmann; (yellow card) 42' Di Matteo; (yellow card) 65' Wassmer	Attendance: 7,200; Referee: (Switzerland) Manfred Schlup, (Grenchen)

8 May 1993 Round 8	Aarau	1–0	Zürich	Stadion Brügglifeld, Aarau
20:00	Romano (yellow card) 52'; Komornicki (yellow card) 88'; Heldmann 90' (1:0)	FCZ summary FCA summary	(yellow card) 35' B. Studer; (yellow card) 50' Grassi; (yellow card) 88' Germann	Attendance: 3,500; Referee: (Switzerland) Manfred Schlup, (Grenchen)

15 May 1993 Round 9	Xamax	0–0	Aarau	Stade de la Maladière, Neuchâtel
20:00		FCA summary		Attendance: 7,300; Referee: (Switzerland) Francesco Bianchi (Chiasso)
Note: Fair game, no cautions.

22 May 1993 Round 10	Aarau	3–0	Lausanne-Sport	Stadion Brügglifeld, Aarau
20:00	Alexandrov 47' (1:0); Alexandrov 62' (2:0); Häsler 88' (3:0)	FCA summary	(red card) 41' J. Studer; (red card) 79' Mateta	Attendance: 6,500; Referee: (Switzerland) Claude Detruche (Thônex)

25 May 1993 Round 11	Young Boys	1–4	Aarau	Wankdorf Stadium, Bern
20:00	Agostino 45' (1:1)	FCA summary	21' (0:1) Alexandrov; 67' (1:2) Alexandrov; 70' (1:3) Alexandrov; 84' (1:4) Alexandrov	Attendance: 13,500; Referee: (Switzerland) Daniel Roduit (Sion)

5 June 1993 Round 12	Aarau	2–1	Sion	Stadion Brügglifeld, Aarau
17:00	Sutter 23' (1:0); Pavličević 76' (2:1)	FCA summary	63' (1:1) Hottiger	Attendance: 9,000; Referee: (Switzerland) Andreas Schluchter (Schönenbuch)

9 June 1993 Round 13	Lugano	1–2	Aarau	Cornaredo, Lugano
20:00	Penzavalli 53' (1:1)	FCA summary	30' (0:1) Heldmann; 62' (1:2) Komornicki	Attendance: 3,500; Referee: (Switzerland) Andreas Schluchter (Schönenbuch)

12 June 1993 Round 14	Aarau	1–1	Servette	Stadion Brügglifeld, Aarau
20:00	Komornicki 20' (1:1)	FCA summary	3' (0:1) Canil	Attendance: 10,200; Referee: (Switzerland) Peter Kellenberger

==== Final league table ====
Pos	Team	Pld	W	D	L	GF	GA	GD	BP	Pts	Qualification
1	Aarau	14	9	4	1	21	7	+14	12	34	Swiss champions, qualified for 1993–94 UEFA Champions League preliminary round and entered 1993 Intertoto Cup
2	Young Boys	14	5	4	5	15	15	0	14	28	Qualified for 1993–94 UEFA Cup and entered 1993 Intertoto Cup
3	Servette	14	5	3	6	16	19	−3	14	27	Qualified for 1993–94 UEFA Cup
4	Lugano	14	7	2	5	21	14	+7	11	27	Swiss Cup winners, qualified for 1993–94 UEFA Cup Winners' Cup
5	Zürich	14	5	4	5	13	14	−1	12	26	Entered 1993 Intertoto Cup
6	Sion	14	4	3	7	17	22	−5	13	24	
7	Xamax	14	4	5	5	16	16	0	11	24	
8	Lausanne-Sport	14	3	3	8	11	23	−12	12	21	Entered 1993 Intertoto Cup

Source: rsssf.com
Rules for classification: 1) points; 2) Position in the qualification.

=== Swiss Cup ===
The 12 clubs from the Nationalliga A were granted byes for the first two rounds and they joined the competition in round 3.

5 October 1992 Round 3	Bellinzona	0–3	Aarau	Stadio Comunale, Bellinzona
		FCA summary	25' (0:1) Wyss; 57' (0:2) Aleksandrov; 89' (0:3) Aleksandrov	Attendance: 680; Referee: (Switzerland) Marcel Vollenweider (Rüti, Zürich)

21 March 1993 Round 4	Aarau	1–2	Grasshopper Club	Stadion Brügglifeld, Aarau
	Di Matteo 33' (1:0)	FCA summary	80' (1:1) Bickel; 82' (1:2) Közle	Attendance: 7,700; Referee: Daniel Roduit Sion, Switzerland

FC Lugano won the cup with a 4–1 win over Grasshopper Club in the final and this was Lugano's third cup title to this date.

=== Friendly matches ===
7 July 1992 Exhibition game	Aarau	5–0	Zürich	Sportplatz Breite, Erlinsbach, Solothurn
	Aleksandrov 7' (1:0); Heldmann 20' (2:0); Aleksandrov 30' (3:0); Wassmer 35' (4:0); Heldmann 85' (5:0)	FCZ summary		Attendance: 1,250; Referee: (Switzerland) Werner Müller (Obererlinsbach)

== Sources ==
- Switzerland 1992–93 at RSSSF
- FCA squad 1992–93 at arowa.ch

Preceded by 1991–92	FC Aarau seasons	Succeeded by 1993–94
