= 1993–94 FC Aarau season =

FC Aarau
1993–94 season
- Club president: Ernst Lämmli
- Head coach: Rolf Fringer
- Stadium: Stadion Brügglifeld, Aarau
- 1993–94 NLA Qualifying: 8th of 12
- Championship group: 4th of 8
- 1993–94 Swiss Cup: Round 3
- 1993–94 UEFA Champions League: Round 1
- 1993 Intertoto Cup: Group 8, 2nd of 5
- Top goalscorer: League: Salvatore Romano (11); All: Salvatore Romano (11)

The 1993–94 season was FC Aarau's 91st season in their existence, since their foundation in 1902. It was their twelfth season in the top flight of Swiss football, following their promotion at the end of 1980–81 season. FCA played their home games in the Stadion Brügglifeld and the stadium is located on the southern outskirts of Aarau, in the territory of the neighboring municipality of Suhr. It is about one and a half kilometers from Aarau city center and the railway station.

== Overview ==
The local businessman and architect Ernst Lämmli was the club's chairman and patron at this time. He held this position since the AGM in 1989. Lämmli had appointed the Austrian Rolf Fringer as new head coach for the previous season and after achieving the championship title with the team that season, his contract was extended.

The FCA first team competed in this season's domestic first-tier 1993–94 Nationalliga A with the clear intention of reaching the championship group and defending their title. To achieve this would mean they would have to finish the qualifying stage under the top eight teams. The team had qualified for the 1993–94 UEFA Champions League preliminary round and their aim here was to reach the main stage. The team also competed in 1993–94 Swiss Cup and they entered the pre-season 1993 Intertoto Cup. The first-tier clubs from the NLA were granted byes for the first two Swiss Cup rounds and joined the competition in the third round on 19 September 1993. The Intertoto Cup was played in groups and this began for FCA on 26 June 1993 and was conclueded on 24 July, shortly before the domestic league-season began.

== Players ==
The following is the list of the FCA first team squad this season. It also includes players that were in the squad the day the domestic league season started, on 28 July 1993, but subsequently left the club after that date.

Note: Flags indicate national team as defined under FIFA eligibility rules; some limited exceptions apply. Players may hold more than one non-FIFA nationality.

No.	Pos.	Nation	Player
1	GK	SUI	Andreas Hilfiker (league games: 35)
—	GK	SUI	Walter Müller (league games: 1)
—	DF	SUI	David Bader (league games: 7)
—	DF	SUI	Bernd Kilian (league games: 26)
—	DF	SUI	Stefan Marini (league games: 9)
—	DF	SUI	Dejan Markovic (league games: 1)
—	DF	CRO	Mirko Pavličević (league games: 33)
—	DF	ITA	Salvatore Romano (league games: 36)
—	DF	SUI	Arne Stiel (league games: 25)
—	DF	SUI	René Weiler (league games: 36)

No.	Pos.	Nation	Player
—	DF	SUI	Daniel Wyss (league games: 28)
—	MF	SUI	Marcel Heldmann (league games: 34)
—	MF	SUI	Heinz Hermann (league games: 34)
—	MF	BRA	Ratinho (league games: 33)
—	MF	SUI	Stefan Renggli (league games: 29)
—	MF	GER	Sascha Stauch (league games: 1)
—	MF	SUI	Thomas Wyss (league games: 36)
—	FW	BUL	Petar Alexandrov (league games: 20)
—	FW	POL	Ryszard Komornicki (league games: 28)
—	FW	POL	Cezary Kucharski (league games: 11)

Players who left the squad

The following is the list of the FCZ first team players that left the squad during the previous season or in the off-season, before the new domestic season began.

Note: Flags indicate national team as defined under FIFA eligibility rules; some limited exceptions apply. Players may hold more than one non-FIFA nationality.

No.	Pos.	Nation	Player
—	DF	SUI	René Fluri (to Locarno)
—	DF	SUI	Beat Huber (to FC Sursee)
—	DF	SUI	Daniel Rupf (to Winterthur)
—	MF	SUI	Roberto Di Matteo (to Lazio)
—	MF	SUI	Andreas Häsler (retired)

No.	Pos.	Nation	Player
—	MF	SUI	Rolf Meier (to St. Gallen)
—	MF	SUI	Reto Rossi (to Kriens)
—	MF	SUI	René Sutter (to Young Boys)
—	FW	LUX	Jeff Saibene (to Old Boys Basel)
—	FW	GER	Uwe Wassmer (to SC Freiburg)

== Results ==
Legend

Win Draw Loss Postponed

=== Nationalliga A ===
==== Qualification phase ====
The first stage of the NLA began on 28 July 1993 and was completed on 12 December. The top eight teams in the qualification phase would advance to the championship group and the last four teams would play against relegation.

28 July 1993 Round 1	Aarau	2–1	Grasshopper Club	Stadion Brügglifeld, Aarau
20:00	T. Wyss 1' (1:0); Alexandrov 78' (2:0)	FCA summary	80' (pen. 2:1) Nakhid	Attendance: 9,200; Referee: (Switzerland) Serge Muhmenthaler (Grenchen)

31 July 1993 Round 2	Sion	4–0	Aarau	Stade Tourbillon, Sion
20:00	Túlio 28' (1:0); Piffaretti 70' (2:0); Assis 74' (3:0); Bonvin 78' (4:0); Rey (yellow card); Fournier (yellow card)	FCA summary	(yellow card) Komornicki	Attendance: 7,500; Referee: (Switzerland) Andreas Schluchter (Schönenbuch)

3 August 1993 Round 5	Aarau	2–0	Kriens	Stadion Brügglifeld, Aarau
20:00	Romano 39' (1:0); Alexandrov 54' (2:0); Romano (yellow card); Pavličević (yellow card)	FCA summary	(yellow card) Triebold	Attendance: 6,100; Referee: (Switzerland) Jürg Herrmann (Hinterkapplen (Wohlen bei Bern))
Note: Match originally scheduled for 18 August, but was pulled forward so that the UEFA Champions League preliminary round could be played on that date.

7 August 1993 Round 3	Aarau	1–0	Young Boys	Stadion Brügglifeld, Aarau
20:00	Komornicki 49' (pen.)	FCA summary	(yellow card) Pagano; (yellow card) Reich	Attendance: 5,900; Referee: (Switzerland) Andreas Schluchter (Schönenbuch)

14 August 1993 Round 4	Yverdon-Sports	0–0	Aarau	Stade Municipal, Yverdon
20:00	Taillet (yellow card); Douglas (yellow card)	FCA summary	(yellow card) Alexandrov	Attendance: 4,900; Referee: (Switzerland) Daniel Roduit (Sion)

21 August 1993 Round 6	Zürich	3–1	Aarau	Letzigrund, Zürich
20:00	Baljić 21' (1:0); Mazzarelli (yellow card) 27'; Baljić 41' (2:1); Widmer (yellow card) 53'; Baljić (yellow card) 73'; Kägi 80' (3:1)	FCZ summary FCA summary	40' (1:1) Romano	Attendance: 5,100; Referee: (Switzerland) Andreas Schluchter (Schönenbuch)

20 August 1993 Round 7	Aarau	1–1	Servette	Stadion Brügglifeld, Aarau
20:00	Heldmann 64' (1:0)	FCA summary	82' (1:1) Neuville	Attendance: 3,900; Referee: (Switzerland) Serge Muhmenthaler (Grenchen)
Note: Fair game, no cautions.

28 August 1993 Round 8	Aarau	4–0	Xamax	Stadion Brügglifeld, Aarau
20:00	Alexandrov 4' (1:0); Alexandrov 19' (2:0); D. Wyss; Romano 74' (pen.); Stiel (yellow card)	FCA summary	(yellow card) Martin	Attendance: 3,500; Referee: (Switzerland) Dieter Schoch (Attiswil)

1 September 1993 Round 9	Lausanne-Sport	P–P	Aarau	Olympique de la Pontaise, Lausanne
20:00		FCA summary
Note: Later rescheduled to 22 September 1993

11 September 1993 Round 10	Aarau	0–2	Lugano	Stadion Brügglifeld, Aarau
17:00		FCA summary	21' (0:1) Colombo; 69' (0:2) Subiat	Attendance: 2,800; Referee: (Switzerland) Claude Detruche (Thônex)
Note: No yellow cards

22 September 1993 Round 9	Lausanne-Sport	2–0	Aarau	Olympique de la Pontaise, Lausanne
20:00	Jacobacci 20' (1:0); La Placa 43' (2:0); Biaggi (yellow card)	FCA summary	(yellow card) D. Wyss; (yellow card) Hermann	Attendance: 4,500; Referee: (Switzerland) Marcel Vollenweider (Rüti, Zürich)
Note: Originally scheduled for 1 September, but after being postponed was rescheduled.

25 September 1993 Round 11	Luzern	5–2	Aarau	Stadion Allmend, Luzern
20:00	Güntensperger 22' (1:0); Gerstenmájer 34' (2:0); Gerstenmájer 44' (3:0); Güntensperger 71' (4:2); Gerstenmájer 76' (5:2)	FCA summary	62' (3:1) Romano; 63' (3:2) Kilian; (yellow card) Alexandrov; (yellow card) T. Wyss	Attendance: 6,800; Referee: (Switzerland) Andreas Schluchter (Schönenbuch)

2 October 1993 Round 12	Grasshopper Club	P–P	Aarau	Hardturm, Zürich
		FCA summary
Note: Later rescheduled to 27 October 1993

6 October 1993 Round 13	Aarau	0–2	Sion	Stadion Brügglifeld, Aarau
20:00		FCA summary	28' (0:1) Rey; 83' (0:2) Hottiger; (yellow card) Clausen	Attendance: 3,100; Referee: (Switzerland) Gottfried Friedrich (Seedorf, Uri)

17 October 1993 Round 14	Young Boys	2–0	Aarau	Wankdorf Stadium, Bern
20:00	Hartmann 39' (1:0); Bregy 86' (2:0); Bregy (yellow card); Rotzetter (yellow card)	FCA summary	(yellow card) Heldmann; (yellow card) Kilian	Attendance: 7,400; Referee: (Switzerland) Erwin Fölmli

24 October 1993 Round 15	Aarau	3–1	Yverdon-Sports	Stadion Brügglifeld, Aarau
	Alexandrov 76' (1:1); Alexandrov 86' (2:1); Kilian 90+2' (3:1)	FCA summary	5' (0:1) Urosevic; (yellow card) (yellow-red card) 73' Guex	Attendance: 3,500; Referee: (Switzerland) Marcel Vollenweider (Rüti, Zürich)

27 October 1993 Round 12	Grasshopper Club	1–1	Aarau	Hardturm, Zürich
19:00	Thüler 82' (1:1); Thüler (yellow card)	FCA summary	18' (0:1) Heldmann; (yellow card) Ratinho	Attendance: 3,300; Referee: (Switzerland) Michel Zen-Ruffinen
Note: This match was originally scheduled for 2 October 1993, but was postponed, therefore rescheduled.

31 October 1993 Round 16	Kriens	0–1	Aarau	Stadion Kleinfeld, Kriens
14:30	Gwerder (yellow card)	FCA summary	88' (0:1) Heldmann; (yellow card) Renggli; (yellow card) Pavličević	Attendance: 3,000; Referee: (Switzerland) Francesco Bianchi (Chiasso)

10 November 1993 Round 17	Aarau	1–0	Zürich	Stadion Brügglifeld, Aarau
19:00	Pavličević 31' (1:0); Kilian (yellow card) 39'	FCA summary FCZ summary	(yellow card) 38' Şahin; (yellow card) 48' Widmer; (yellow card) 54' Ernst	Attendance: 4,500; Referee: (Switzerland) Serge Muhmenthaler (Grenchen)

21 November 1993 Round 18	Servette	1–1	Aarau	Charmilles Stadium, Geneva
14:30	Neuville 65' (1:0); Ohrel (yellow card); Egli (yellow card); Gjurovski (yellow card)	FCA summary	76' (1:1) Hermann; (yellow card) Stiel; (yellow card) Kilian	Attendance: 4,500; Referee: (Switzerland) Jürg Herrmann (Hinterkapplen (Wohlen bei Bern))

28 November 1993 Round 19	Xamax	3–0	Aarau	Stade de la Maladière, Neuchâtel
16:00	Ramzy 26' (1:0); Chassot 78' (2:0); Zé Maria 86' (3:0); Perret (yellow card)	FCA summary	(yellow card) T. Wyss	Attendance: 7,200; Referee: (Switzerland) Peter Kellenberger

1 December 1993 Round 20	Aarau	0–0	Lausanne-Sport	Stadion Brügglifeld, Aarau
17:00	Comisetti (yellow card); Vernaz (yellow card); Badea (yellow card)	FCA summary	(yellow card) Alexandrov	Attendance: 3,200; Referee: (Switzerland) Claude Detruche (Thônex)

5 December 1993 Round 21	Lugano	1–3	Aarau	Cornaredo, Lugano
14:30	Subiat 68' (1:2); Galvão (yellow card)	FCA summary	11' (0:1) Renggli; 49' (0:2) Romano; 88' (o.g.) (Carrasco); (yellow card) Kilian	Attendance: 3,100; Referee: (Switzerland) Daniel Roduit (Sion)

12 December 1993 Round 22	Aarau	1–2	Luzern	Stadion Brügglifeld, Aarau
14:30	Romano 63' (1:2); Heldmann (yellow card) (yellow-red card)	FCA summary	17' (0:1) Güntensperger; 27' (0:2) Güntensperger	Attendance: 7,700; Referee: (Switzerland) Michel Zen-Ruffinen

==== Qualification table ====
Pos	Team	Pld	W	D	L	GF	GA	GD	Pts	Qualification
1	Grasshopper Club	22	12	7	3	37	15	+22	43	Advance to championship round halved points (rounded up) as bonus
2	Sion	22	11	9	2	34	14	+20	42	Advance to championship round halved points (rounded up) as bonus
3	Young Boys	22	9	7	6	37	25	+12	34	Advance to championship round halved points (rounded up) as bonus
4	Servette	22	9	7	6	38	37	+1	34	Advance to championship round halved points (rounded up) as bonus
5	Lausanne-Sport	22	9	6	7	28	27	+1	33	Advance to championship round halved points (rounded up) as bonus
6	Lugano	22	7	8	7	23	27	−4	29	Advance to championship round halved points (rounded up) as bonus
7	Luzern	22	8	5	9	26	32	−6	29	Advance to championship round halved points (rounded up) as bonus
8	Aarau	22	8	5	9	24	31	−7	29	Advance to championship round halved points (rounded up) as bonus
9	Zürich	22	6	8	8	25	22	+3	26	Continue to promotion/relegation round
10	Xamax	22	4	9	9	24	31	−7	21	Continue to promotion/relegation round
11	Yverdon-Sport	22	3	8	11	19	33	−14	17	Continue to promotion/relegation round
12	Kriens	22	3	7	12	17	38	−21	16	Continue to promotion/relegation round

Source: rsssf.com
Rules for classification: 1) Points; 2) Goal difference; 3) Goals scored; 4) Head-to-head points; 5) Away goals scored; 6) Draw.

==== Championship group ====
The first eight teams of the qualification phase competed in the Championship round. The teams took half of the points (rounded up to complete units) gained in the qualification as bonus with them. The championship group began on 20 February 1994 and was completed on 10 May.

20 February 1994 Round 1	Grasshopper Club	1–2	Aarau	Hardturm, Zürich
14:30	Magnin 76' (1:2)	FCA summary	5' (pen.) Kucharski; 41' (0:2) Weiler; (yellow card) Pavličević	Attendance: 3,500; Referee: (Switzerland) Daniel Roduit (Sion)

27 February 1994 Round 2	Aarau	1–1	Servette	Stadion Brügglifeld, Aarau
14:30	Kucharski 80' (1:1); D. Wyss (yellow card)	FCA summary	25' (0:1) Neuville; (yellow card) Mild	Attendance: 5,700; Referee: (Switzerland) Karl Strässle (Steinach)

5 March 1994 Round 3	Lugano	1–2	Aarau	Cornaredo, Lugano
20:00	Galvão 25' (1:0); Fernandez (yellow card); Käslin (yellow card)	FCA summary	49' (1:1) Komornicki; 77' (1:2) Heldmann; (yellow card) Stiel	Attendance: 2,500; Referee: (Switzerland) Hans Müller (Bern)

13 March 1994 Round 4	Aarau	3–0	Luzern	Stadion Brügglifeld, Aarau
14:30	Romano 45' (1:0); Kucharski 59' (pen.); Kucharski 67' (3:0); Pavličević (yellow card)	FCA summary	(red card) 31' Mutter; (yellow card) Camenzind	Attendance: 6,000; Referee: (Switzerland) Daniel Roduit (Sion)

19 March 1994 Round 5	Sion	1–1	Aarau	Stade Tourbillon, Sion
17:30	Bonvin 9' (1:0); Herr (yellow card)	FCA summary	32' (1:1) Kucharski; (yellow card) Kilian	Attendance: 7,800; Referee: (Switzerland) Claude Detruche (Thônex)

27 March 1994 Round 6	Aarau	2–2	Young Boys	Stadion Brügglifeld, Aarau
14:30	Romano 39' (1:1); Kucharski 74' (2:2)	FCA summary	24' (0:1) Moser; 56' (1:2) Hartmann; (yellow card) Kobel	Attendance: 6,400; Referee: (Switzerland) Marcel Vollenweider (Rüti, Zürich)

2 April 1994 Round 7	Aarau	0–1	Lausanne-Sport	Stadion Brügglifeld, Aarau
17:30	Heldmann (yellow card); Pavličević (yellow card)	FCA summary	59' (0:1) Sogbie; (yellow card) Sylvestre; (yellow card) Badea; (yellow card) Hänzi	Attendance: 3,600; Referee: (Switzerland) Jürg Herrmann (Hinterkapplen (Wohlen bei Bern))

9 April 1994 Round 8	Lausanne-Sport	1–0	Aarau	Olympique de la Pontaise, Lausanne
20:00	Sogbie 54' (1:0); Jacobacci (yellow card)	FCA summary	(yellow card) D. Wyss; (yellow card) Romano; (yellow card) T. Wyss	Attendance: 3,500; Referee: (Switzerland) Claude Detruche (Thônex)

16 April 1994 Round 9	Young Boys	1–2	Aarau	Wankdorf Stadium, Bern
20:00	Bregy 8' (1:0); Baumann (red card) 90'; Bregy (yellow card)	FCA summary	20' (1:1) Kucharski; 80' (1:2) Romano; (yellow card) Kucharski; (yellow card) T. Wyss	Attendance: 4,000; Referee: (Switzerland) Erwin Fölmli

23 April 1994 Round 10	Aarau	2–1	Sion	Stadion Brügglifeld, Aarau
17:30	Kucharski 33' (1:0); Pavličević 66' (2:1)Kucharski (yellow card)	FCA summary	50' (1:1) Fournier	Attendance: 5,400; Referee: (Switzerland) Gottfried Friedrich (Seedorf, Uri)

30 April 1994 Round 11	Luzern	1–3	Aarau	Stadion Allmend, Luzern
20:00	Tuce 14' (1:0)	FCA summary	56' (1:1) Pavličević; 69' (1:2) Ratinho; 74' (1:3) Heldmann	Attendance: 5,700; Referee: (Switzerland) Kurt Zuppinger (Bremgarten, Aargau)
Note: Fair game, no cautions

3 May 1994 Round 12	Aarau	4–3	Lugano	Stadion Brügglifeld, Aarau
20:00	Romano 21' (1:0); Weiler 62' (2:2); Ratinho 86' (pen. 3:3); Ratinho 90' (4:3)	FCA summary	47' (1:1) Subiat; 50' (1:2); 81' (pen. 2:3) Galvão; (yellow card) Fernandez; (yellow card) Englund	Attendance: 3,900; Referee: (Switzerland) Daniel Roduit (Sion)

7 May 1994 Round 13	Servette	1–0	Aarau	Charmilles Stadium, Geneva
20:00	Neuville 86' (1:0); Ohrel (yellow card)	FCA summary	(yellow card) Kilian	Attendance: 7,800; Referee: (Switzerland) Serge Muhmenthaler (Grenchen)

10 May 1994 Round 14	Aarau	1–1	Grasshopper Club	Stadion Brügglifeld, Aarau
20:00	Romano 57' (1:0)	FCA summary	66' (1:1) Élber; (yellow card) Wiederkehr	Attendance: 8,100; Referee: (Switzerland) Gottfried Friedrich (Seedorf, Uri)

==== Final league table ====
Pos	Team	Pld	W	D	L	GF	GA	GD	BP	Pts	Qualification
1	Servette	14	8	5	1	29	14	+15	13	34	Swiss champions, qualified for 1994–95 Champions League and entered 1994 Intertoto Cup
2	Grasshopper Club	14	6	5	3	28	17	+11	16	33	Swiss Cup winners, qualified for 1994–95 Cup Winners' Cup and entered 1994 Intertoto Cup
3	Sion	14	5	5	4	21	15	+6	16	31	qualified for 1994–95 UEFA Cup first round and entered 1994 Intertoto Cup
4	Aarau	14	7	4	3	23	16	+7	11	29	qualified for 1994–95 UEFA Cup preliminary round
5	Lugano	14	5	5	4	21	19	+2	11	26	
6	Young Boys	14	2	6	6	13	23	−10	13	23	entered 1994 Intertoto Cup
7	Lausanne-Sport	14	4	1	9	14	28	−14	12	21	entered 1994 Intertoto Cup
8	Luzern	14	2	3	9	15	32	−17	11	18	

Source: rsssf.com
Rules for classification: 1) points; 2) Position in the qualification.

=== Swiss Cup ===
The first-tier clubs from the 1993–94 Nationalliga A were granted byes for the first two rounds and joined the competition in round three. These teams were seeded and cound not be drawn against each other. The draw respected regionalities, when possible, and the lower classed team was granted home advantage.

19 September 1993 Round 3	Basel	4–1	Aarau	St. Jakob Stadium, Basel
20:00	Cantaluppi (yellow card) 22'; Jeitziner 52' (pen. 1:1); Smajić (yellow card) 55'; Smajić 59' (2:1); Smajić 72' (3:1); Zuffi 78' (4:1); Walker (yellow card) 83'	FCB summary FCA summary	(yellow card) 14' Stiel; 18' (o.g. 0:1) Meier; (yellow card) 70' Romano	Attendance: 12,500; Referee: (Switzerland) Dieter Schoch (Attiswil)
Note: Basel ohne Derkach, Bauer, Baumgartner. Aarau ohne Pavlicevic, Marini, Bader und Rupf (alle verletzt).

=== Champions League ===
As Swiss champions from last season FCA were qualified for the 1993–94 UEFA Champions League preliminary round

==== Preliminary round ====
The first legs were played on 18 and 22 August, and the second legs on 1 September 1993.

18 August 1993 First leg	Omonia (Cyprus)	2–1	(Switzerland) Aarau	Makario Stadium, Nicosia
19:00	Kizilashvili 15' (1:0); Kizilashvili 61' (2:0)	UEFA reort FCA summary	Ratinho 62' (2:1)	Attendance: 14,268; Referee: Gheorghe Constantin (Romania)

1 September 1993 Return leg	Aarau (Switzerland)	2–0 (3–2 agg.)	(Cyprus) Omonia	Stadion Brügglifeld, Aarau
20:00	Stiel 7' (1:0); Heldmann 37' (2:0)	UEFA report FCA summary		Attendance: 8,356; Referee: Hermann Albrecht (Germany)
Note: Aarau won 3–2 on aggregate and advanced to first round

==== First round ====
The Champions League first round was the first stage of the main competition of the 1993–94 UEFA Champions League, and featured 32 teams. It began on 15 September with the first legs and ended on 29 September 1993 with the second legs. The 16 winners advanced to the second round.

15 September 1993 First leg	Aarau (Switzerland)	0–1	(Italy) Milan	Hardturm, Zürich
20:30		UEFA summary FCA summary	Papin 54'	Attendance: 9,400; Referee: Alan Snoddy (Northern Ireland)

29 September 1993 Return leg	Milan (Italy)	0–0 (1–0 agg.)	(Switzerland) Aarau	San Siro, Milan
20:30		summary FCA summary		Attendance: 58,993; Referee: Marc Batta (France)
Note: Milan won 1–0 on aggregate and advanced to the next round.

=== Intertoto Cup ===
The 1993 Intertoto Cup was played in the pre-season. No knock-out rounds were contested and therefore no absolute winner was declared. The teams were divided into 8 groups of 5 teams each. Opponents played each other once. Aarau were in group eight.

==== Group 8 matches ====
26 June 1993 Matchday 1	Iraklis F.C. (Thessaloniki) (Greece)	0–1	(Switzerland) Aarau	Kaftanzoglio Stadium in Thessaloniki, Greece.
	Dimitriadis (yellow card)	FCA summary	69' (0:1) Heldmann	Attendance: 1,000

10 July 1993 Matchday 2	Aarau (Switzerland)	2–2	(Israel) Beitar Jerusalem	Stadion Brügglifeld, Aarau
	Komornicki 48' (pen.); Pavličević (yellow card) 51'; T. Wyss (yellow card) 87'; Alexandrov 90+2' (2:2)	FCA summary	(yellow card) 43' Karadi; 66' (1:1) Elarar; 89' (1:2) Schweig	Attendance: 1,150; Referee: (Switzerland) Werner Müller (Obererlinsbach)

18 July 1993 Matchday 3	Aarau (Switzerland)	0–0	(Germany) Dynamo Dresden	Stadion Brügglifeld, Aarau
		FCA summary	(yellow card) 16' Schößler; (yellow card) 40' Kmetsch; (yellow card) 43' Schmäler	Attendance: 2,900; Referee: (Switzerland) Andreas Schluchter (Schönenbuch)

24 July 1993 Matchday 4	Wiener SC (Austria)	1–1	(Switzerland) Aarau	Sport-Platz, Gaweinstal, Austria
	Keglevits 70' (pen.)	FCA summary	(red card) 70' T. Wyss; 78' (1:1) Alexandrov	Attendance: 600; Referee: (Austria) Steindl

==== Group table ====
Pos	Team	Pld	W	D	L	GF	GA	GD	Pts	DRE	AAR	WSC	IRA	BEI
1	(Germany) Dynamo Dresden	4	2	2	0	4	1	+3	6	—	–	1–0	–	2–0
2	(Switzerland) Aarau	4	1	3	0	4	3	+1	5	0–0	—	–	–	2–2
3	(Austria) Wiener SC	4	1	2	1	5	4	+1	4	–	1–1	—	4–2	–
4	(Greece) Iraklis	4	1	1	2	5	7	−2	3	1–1	0–1	–	—	–
5	(Israel) Beitar Jerusalem	4	0	2	2	3	6	−3	2	–	–	0–0	1–2	—

Source: Pawel Mogielnicki's Page
Rules for classification: 1) Points; 2) Goal difference; 3) Goals scored; 4) Head-to-head points; 5) Away goals scored; 6) Draw.

=== Friendly matches ===
==== Pre-season ====
14 July 1993 Sepione Cup semi-final	Aarau (Switzerland)	3–3 (4–5 p)	(Switzerland) Basel	Moos, Balsthal
19:30	Aleksandrov 60' (1:3); Aleksandrov 62' (2:3); Komornicki 89' (pen. 3:3)	FCB summary	15' (0:1) Zuffi; 39' (0:2) Zuffi; 42' (0:3) Zuffi	Attendance: 1,800; Referee: (Switzerland) Francis Fischer (Arch)
	Penalties
	Hermann (penalty scored); Komornicki (penalty scored); Pavličević (penalty missed); Weiler (penalty scored); Romano (penalty scored); Marini (penalty missed)		(penalty scored) Zuffi; (penalty missed) Smajić; (penalty scored) Berg; (penalty scored) Jeitziner; (penalty scored) Meier; (penalty scored) Steingruber
Note: The Sempione Cup was a club tournament played in summer at Sportanlage Moos, Balsthal, during the years 1987 to 2004. Aarau without Bader, Rupf, Kilian. Basel without Schürmann, Baumgartner (all injured).

==== Winter break ====
15 January 1994 Winter break	Basel (Switzerland)	3–1	(Switzerland) Aarau	St. Jakob Stadium, Basel
14:30	Cantaluppi 32' (1:0); Berg 43' (2:1); Derkach 46' (3:1)	FCB summary	34' (1:1) Komornicki	Attendance: 1,500; Referee: (Switzerland) Serge Muhmenthaler (Grenchen)
Note: FCB without the slightly injured Ceccaroni, FCA without Hilfiker, Heldmann, Pavlicevic (resting) and Renggli (injured).

== Sources ==
- Switzerland 1993–94 at RSSSF
- FCA squad 1993–94 at arowa.ch

Preceded by 1992–93	FC Aarau seasons	Succeeded by 1994–95
