= 1991–92 FC Aarau season =

FC Aarau
1991–92 season
- Club president: Ernst Lämmli
- Player-coach and co-coach: Roger Wehrli; Alfred Strasser
- Stadium: Stadion Brügglifeld, Aarau
- 1991–92 NLA Qualifying: 11th of 12
- Promotion/relegation round: 2nd of 8
- 1991–92 Swiss Cup: Round 4
- Top goalscorer: League: Petar Alexandrov (12); All: Petar Alexandrov (12)

The 1991–92 season was FC Aarau's 89th season in their existence, since their foundation in 1902. It was their tenth season in the top flight of Swiss football, following their promotion at the end of 1980–81 season. FCA played their home games in the Stadion Brügglifeld and the stadium is located on the southern outskirts of Aarau, in the territory of the neighboring municipality of Suhr. It is about one and a half kilometers from Aarau city center and the railway station.

== Overview ==
Since the AGM in 1989 the local businessman Ernst Lämmli was the club's chairman and patron. Lämmli was an architect and ran his own architectural firm. He had appointed Roger Wehrli as player-coach the previous season and Wehrli continued in this position for this season as well. The FCA first team competed in this years domestic first-tier 1991–92 Nationalliga A with the clear intention of retaining their top level status. The team also competed in 1991–92 Swiss Cup. They had not qualified for any of the UEFA European tournaments and they did not enter the Intertoto Cup.

== Players ==
The following is the list of the FCA first team squad this season. It also includes players that were in the squad the day the domestic league season started, on 24 July 1991, but subsequently left the club after that date.

Note: Flags indicate national team as defined under FIFA eligibility rules; some limited exceptions apply. Players may hold more than one non-FIFA nationality.

No.	Pos.	Nation	Player
1	GK	SUI	Andreas Hilfiker (league games: 35)
—	GK	SUI	Niels Hochuli (league games: 1)
—	DF	SUI	Adrian Aebi (league games: 16)
—	DF	SUI	David Bader (league games: 1)
—	DF	SUI	René Fluri (league games: 17)
—	DF	SUI	Beat Huber (league games: 17)
—	DF	SUI	Rico Juchli (league games: 12)
—	DF	SUI	Bernd Kilian (league games: 22)
—	DF	SUI	Heribert Koch (league games: 24)
—	DF	SUI	Giuseppe Longa (league games: 2)
—	DF	SUI	Daniel Wyss (league games: 22)
—	MF	SUI	Daniel Chèvre (league games: 2)
—	MF	SUI	Marcel Heldmann (league games: 12)

No.	Pos.	Nation	Player
—	MF	SUI	Rolf Meier (league games: 32)
—	MF	SUI	Reto Rossi (league games: 33)
—	MF	SUI	René Sutter (league games: 33)
—	FW	BUL	Petar Alexandrov (league games: 34)
—	FW	SUI	Farzad Ghadamian (league games: 7)
—	FW	SUI	Andreas Hediger (league games: 0)
—	FW	POL	Ryszard Komornicki (league games: 23)
—	FW	FIN	Mika Lipponen (league games: 15)
—	FW	SUI	Martin Müller (league games: 1)
—	FW	SUI	Roland Müller (league games: 5)
—	FW	LUX	Jeff Saibene (league games: 1)
—	FW	SUI	Frank Triebold (league games: 15)
—	FW	GER	Uwe Wassmer (league games: 30)
—	FW	SUI	Roger Wehrli (league games: 36)

== Results ==
Legend

Win Draw Loss Postponed

=== Nationalliga A ===
==== Qualification phase ====
The first stage of the NLA began on 24 July 1991 and was completed on 8 December. The top eight teams in the qualification phase would advance to the championship group and the last four teams would play against relegation.

24 July 1991 Round 1	Aarau	4–0	Grasshopper Club	Stadion Brügglifeld, Aarau
20:00	Sutter 22' (pen.); Wassmer 57' (2:0); Wassmer 59' (3:0); Alexandrov 90' (4:0); Koch (yellow card)	FCA summary	(yellow card) Gämperle	Attendance: 6,000; Referee: (Switzerland) Karl Strässle (Steinach)

27 July 1991 Round 2	Sion	1–1	Aarau	Stade Tourbillon, Sion
20:00	Brigger 85' (1:1); Piffaretti (yellow card)	FCA summary	45' (0:1) Kilian; (yellow card) Wassmer; (yellow card) Sutter; (yellow card) Juchli	Attendance: 9,800; Referee: (Switzerland) Peter Kellenberger

3 August 1991 Round 3	Aarau	0–3	Lausanne-Sport	Stadion Brügglifeld, Aarau
20:00		FCA summary	29' (0:1) J. Studer; 62' (0:2) Cina; 81' (0:3) van den Boogaard; (yellow card) Isabella; (yellow card) Ohrel	Attendance: 8,200; Referee: (Switzerland) Peter Kellenberger

6 August 1991 Round 4	Young Boys	5–0	Aarau	Wankdorf Stadium, Bern
20:00	Gross 17' (1:0) (Wassmer) 20' (o.g.); Jakobsen 53' (3:0); Jakobsen 76' (4:0); Hänzi 80' (5:0)	FCA summary		Attendance: 6,900; Referee: (Liechtenstein) Roland Beck (Triesenberg)
Note: Fair game, no cautions.

10 August 1991 Round 5	Aarau	2–0	Luzern	Stadion Brügglifeld, Aarau
20:00	Meier 57' (1:0); Meier 77' (2:0); Kilian (yellow card); Koch (yellow card)	FCA summary	(red card) 48' Rueda; (yellow card) Birrer	Attendance: 8,200; Referee: (Switzerland) Gottfried Friedrich (Seedorf, Uri)

17 August 1991 Round 6	Wettingen	2–2	Aarau	Stadion Altenburg, Wettingen
20:00	Heldmann 10' (1:0); Heldmann 18' (2:0); Mathy (yellow card); Fink (yellow card); Nicora (yellow card)	FCA summary	54' (2:1) Meier; 82' (2:2) Meier; (yellow card) Kilian; (yellow card) Rossi	Attendance: 5,300; Referee: (Switzerland) Bruno Barmettler

24 August 1991 Round 7	Aarau	0–0	Lugano	Stadion Brügglifeld, Aarau
20:00	Triebold (yellow card)	FCA summary	(red card) 16' Fornera; (yellow card) Tapia; (yellow card) Zuffi; (yellow card) Penzavalli; (yellow card) Hertig; (yellow card) Tami; (yellow card) Locatelli	Attendance: 5,500; Referee: (Switzerland) Karl Strässle (Steinach)

28 August 1991 Round 8	Servette	2–2	Aarau	Stadion Breite, Schaffhausen
20:00	Hermann 66' (1:2); Schepull 89' (2:2); Sinval (yellow card); Aeby (yellow card); Schepull (yellow card)	FCA summary	38' (0:1) Sutter; 52' (0:2) Alexandrov; (red card) 76' Meier; (yellow card) Kilian	Attendance: 5,600; Referee: (Switzerland) Erwin Fölmli

31 August 1991 Round 9	Aarau	1–2	St. Gallen	Stadion Brügglifeld, Aarau
20:00	Alexandrov 84' (1:2)	FCA summary	52' (o.g.) (Rossi); 73' (0:2) Blättler; (yellow card) Thüler; (yellow card) Zambrano; (yellow card) Raschle; (yellow card) Hengartner	Attendance: 4,500; Referee: (Switzerland) Paul-Louis Christe (Lausanne)

4 September 1991 Round 10	Aarau	1–3	Zürich	Stadion Brügglifeld, Aarau
20:00	Rossi 19' (1:0); Kilian (yellow card) 60'	FCA summary FCZ summary	49' (1:1) Makalakalane; 55' (1:2) Kok; 83' (1:3) Beer	Attendance: 3,900; Referee: (Switzerland) Arturo Martino (Neukirch an der Thur)

14 September 1991 Round 11	Xamax	1–0	Aarau	Stade de la Maladière, Neuchâtel
20:00	Sutter 59' (1:0); Chassot (yellow card)	FCA summary	(yellow card) Koch	Attendance: 7,800; Referee: (Switzerland) Gottfried Friedrich (Seedorf, Uri)

21 September 1991 Round 12	Grasshopper Club	3–1	Aarau	Hardturm, Zürich
17:30	Marchand 17' (1:0); Közle 49' (2:0); A. Sutter 65' (3:0); Marchand (yellow card)	FCA summary	(yellow card) 40' (yellow-red card) 57' Aebi; (red card) 87' Wehrli; 90' (pen.) R. Sutter	Attendance: 4,700; Referee: (Liechtenstein) Roland Beck (Triesenberg)

5 October 1991 Round 13	Aarau	2–2	Sion	Stadion Brügglifeld, Aarau
20:00	Sutter 78' (pen.); Alexandrov 80' (2:2); Koch (yellow card)	FCA summary	20' (0:1) Baljić; 72' (0:2) Orlando; (yellow card) Lehmann	Attendance: 2,600; Referee: (Switzerland) Karl Strässle (Steinach)

12 October 1991 Round 14	Lausanne-Sport	P–P	Aarau	Olympique de la Pontaise, Lausanne
		[ FCA summary]

15 October 1991 Round 15	Aarau	1–4	Young Boys	Stadion Brügglifeld, Aarau
20:00	Sutter 34' (1:1); Chèvre (yellow card); Koch (yellow card)	FCA summary	7' (0:1) Reich; 49' (1:2) Jakobsen; 55' (1:3) Baumann; 80' (1:4) Kunz; (yellow card) Reich	Attendance: 2,400; Referee: (Switzerland) Freddy Philippoz (Sion)

19 October 1991 Round 16	Luzern	0–0	Aarau	Stadion Allmend, Luzern
20:00	van Eck (yellow card); Birrer (yellow card)	FCA summary	(yellow card) R. Müller	Attendance: 5,400; Referee: (Switzerland) Andreas Schluchter (Schönenbuch)

26 October 1991 Round 17	Aarau	2–0	Wettingen	Stadion Brügglifeld, Aarau
17:30	Meier 15' (1:0); Alexandrov 26' (2:0)	FCA summary	(yellow card) Mathy; (yellow card) Dal Santo	Attendance: 1,700; Referee: (Switzerland) Daniel Roduit (Sion)

30 October 1991 Round 14	Lausanne-Sport	5–0	Aarau	Olympique de la Pontaise, Lausanne
20:00	Cina 4' (1:0) van den Boogaard 22' (2:0); Cina 48' (3:0); Fryda 59' (4:0); Gigon 79' (5:0)	FCA summary		Attendance: 5,200; Referee: (Switzerland) Andreas Weber (Bern)
Note: The game was originally scheduled for 12 October, but it was postponed and rescheduled.

3 November 1991 Round 18	Lugano	1–1	Aarau	Cornaredo, Lugano
14:30	Silvera 54' (pen.); Hertig (yellow card); Walker (yellow card)	FCA summary	66' (1:1) Komornicki; (yellow card) Alexandrov; (yellow card) Komornicki; (yellow card) Koch	Attendance: 2,500; Referee: (Switzerland) Michel Zen-Ruffinen

17 November 1991 Round 19	Aarau	0–1	Servette	Stadion Brügglifeld, Aarau
14:30	Wehrli (yellow card); Rossi (yellow card)	FCA summary	87' (0:1) Guex; (yellow card) Jacobacci	Attendance: 2,900; Referee: (Switzerland) Marcel Despland (Yverdon-les-Bains)

24 November 1991 Round 20	St. Gallen	2–0	Aarau	Espenmoos, St. Gallen
14:30	Thüler 56' (1:0); Blättler 83' (2:0); Zambrano (yellow card)	FCA summary	(yellow card) Fluri; (yellow card) Rossi	Attendance: 9,000; Referee: (Switzerland) Freddy Philippoz (Sion)

1 December 1991 Round 21	Zürich	0–0	Aarau	Letzigrund, Zürich
14:30		FCZ summary FCA summary	(yellow card) 9' Fluri	Attendance: 3,300; Referee: (Switzerland) Arturo Martino (Neukirch an der Thur)

7 December 1991 Round 22	Aarau	1–2	Xamax	Stadion Brügglifeld, Aarau
17:30	Sutter 74' (pen.)	FCA summary	20' (0:1) Bonvin; 53' (0:2) Vernier; (yellow card) Perret	Attendance: 1,900; Referee: (Switzerland) Pierre-Alain Vuillemin (Geneva)

==== Qualification table ====
Pos	Team	Pld	W	D	L	GF	GA	GD	Pts	Qualification
1	Lausanne-Sport	22	10	10	2	42	17	+25	30	Advance to championship round halved points (rounded up) as bonus
2	Grasshopper Club	22	12	5	5	39	24	+15	29	Advance to championship round halved points (rounded up) as bonus
3	Sion	22	9	10	3	34	20	+14	28	Advance to championship round halved points (rounded up) as bonus
4	Servette	22	10	7	5	37	28	+9	27	Advance to championship round halved points (rounded up) as bonus
5	Xamax	22	9	6	7	28	22	+6	24	Advance to championship round halved points (rounded up) as bonus
6	St. Gallen	22	8	6	8	27	32	−5	22	Advance to championship round halved points (rounded up) as bonus
7	Young Boys	22	8	5	9	30	30	0	21	Advance to championship round halved points (rounded up) as bonus
8	Zürich	22	4	12	6	22	25	−3	20	Advance to championship round halved points (rounded up) as bonus
9	Luzern	22	5	10	7	21	26	−5	20	Continue to promotion/relegation round
10	Lugano	22	6	8	8	25	36	−11	20	Continue to promotion/relegation round
11	Aarau	22	3	8	11	21	39	−18	14	Continue to promotion/relegation round
12	Wettingen	22	1	7	14	18	45	−27	9	Continue to promotion/relegation round

Source: rsssf.com
Rules for classification: 1) Points; 2) Goal difference; 3) Goals scored; 4) Head-to-head points; 5) Away goals scored; 6) Draw.

==== Promotion/relegation Phase Group A ====
The first eight teams of the NLA qualification phase competed in the Championship round. The teams in nineth to twelfth in the qualification phase competed in the promotion/relegation round together with the best six teams of both of the NLB qualification groups. FC Aarau were drawn into Group A. The promotion/relegation phase began on 29 February 1992 and was completed on 30 May.

29 February 1992 Round 1	Locarno	0–1	Aarau	Stadio del Lido, Locarno
17:30	Giani (yellow card)	FCA summary	90+1' (0:1) Lipponen; (yellow card) Koch; (yellow card) Kilian; (yellow card) Rossi	Attendance: 1,900; Referee: (Switzerland) Marcel Despland (Yverdon-les-Bains)

8 March 1992 Round 2	Aarau	0–0	Basel	Stadion Brügglifeld, Aarau
14:30	Heldmann (yellow card) 53'; Rossi (yellow card) 84'	FCB summary FCA summary	(yellow card) 47' Ceccaroni; (yellow card) 80' Marcolli	Attendance: 6,100; Referee: (Switzerland) Arturo Martino (Neukirch an der Thur)
Note: Aarau were without the injured Kilian and Saibene, as well as Komornicki (excess foreign player). FC Basel were without the injured Dittus, Heidenreich, and Zbinden, and without the suspended Bauer. 57th minute, FCB player Wagner was substituted out with a suspected muscle strain.

15 March 1992 Round 3	ES Malley	1–1	Aarau	Stade du Bois-Gentil, Malley
14:30	Ducret 30' (1:0); Ruiz (yellow card)	FCA summary	86' (1:1) Meier; (yellow card) Wassmer; (yellow card) Rossi	Attendance: 500; Referee: (Switzerland) Michel Zen-Ruffinen

21 March 1992 Round 4	Aarau	0–0	Baden	Stadion Brügglifeld, Aarau
17:30	Meier (yellow card); Juchli (yellow card)	FCA summary	(yellow card) Schlatter	Attendance: 2,100; Referee: (Switzerland) Freddy Philippoz (Sion)
Note: FCA without Rossi (suspended after third yellow card).

4 April 1992 Round 5	Lugano	P–P	Aarau	Cornaredo, Lugano
		[ FCA summary]

8 April 1992 Round 6	Aarau	2–0	Bellinzona	Stadion Brügglifeld, Aarau
20:00	Kilian 48' (1:0); Alexandrov 52' (2:0); Heldmann (yellow card)	FCA summary	(yellow card) Vukic; (yellow card) Andreoli	Attendance: 1,600; Referee: (Switzerland) Pierre-Alain Vuillemin (Geneva)

11 April 1992 Round 7	Yverdon-Sports	1–1	Aarau	Stade Municipal, Yverdon
17:30	Béguin 16' (1:0); Castro (yellow card); Taillet (yellow card) (yellow-red card) 90'	FCA summary	85' (1:1) Sutter; (yellow card) Sutter	Attendance: 2,300; Referee: (Switzerland) Francesco Bianchi (Chiasso)

20 April 1992 Round 8	Aarau	2–3	Yverdon-Sports	Stadion Brügglifeld, Aarau
17:30	Heldmann 28' (1:2); Heldmann 38' (2:2); Fluri (yellow card)	FCA summary	16' (0:1) Béguin; 26' (0:2) Béguin; 75' (2:3) Béguin; (yellow card) Taillet; (yellow card) Kékesi	Attendance: 3,100; Referee: (Switzerland) Claude Detruche (Thônex)

25 April 1992 Round 9	Bellinzona	2–3	Aarau	Stadio Comunale, Bellinzona
20:00	Eggeling 33' (pen.); Vukic 82' (2:3)	FCA summary	31' (0:1) Alexandrov; 65' (1:2) Alexandrov; 69' (1:3) Kilian; (yellow card) Huber	Attendance: 1,500; Referee: (Switzerland) Bruno Barmettler

2 May 1992 Round 10	Aarau	0–3 FF	Lugano	Stadion Brügglifeld, Aarau
17:30	Alexandrov 26' (1:1); Wyss 74' (2:1); Wyss (yellow card); Fluri (yellow card)	FCA summary	14' (0:1) Zuffi; (yellow card) Zuffi; (yellow card) Graciani; (yellow card) Tami	Attendance: 2,100; Referee: (Switzerland) Michel Zen-Ruffinen
Note: The match was subsequently awarded as a 0-3 forfeit, allegedly due to Daniel Wyss's suspension for receiving a red card in a youth team match the previous day. However, the red card was issued to a different player, leading to Wyss's erroneous dismissal. Reportedly, the Swiss Football Association (SFV) confirmed Wyss's eligibility to play in this match for FCA via fax. Despite this, the forfeit decision stood.

9 May 1992 Round 11	Basel	0–1	Aarau	Esp Stadium, Fislisbach
20:00	Isler (yellow card)	FCA summary	84' (0:1) Heldmann	Attendance: 2,400; Referee: (Switzerland) Arturo Martino (Neukirch an der Thur)

12 May 1992 Round 5	Lugano	0–0	Aarau	Cornaredo, Lugano
20:00	Tami (yellow card); Walker (yellow card)	FCA summary	(yellow card) Heldmann; (yellow card) Kilian; (yellow card) Sutter	Attendance: 2,500; Referee: (Switzerland) Freddy Philippoz (Sion)
Note: This game was originally scheduled for 4 April, but because it was posponed it was rescheduled to 12 May.

16 May 1992 Round 12	Aarau	4–1	ES Malley	Stadion Brügglifeld, Aarau
17:30	Alexandrov 4' (1:0); Alexandrov 12' (2:0); Juchli 48' (3:1); Wyss 84' (4:1); Aebi (yellow card)	FCA summary	32' (2:1) Vigh; (yellow card) Perotti	Attendance: 1,600; Referee: (Switzerland) Pierre-Alain Vuillemin (Geneva)

23 May 1992 Round 13	Basel	2–4	Aarau	St. Jakob Stadium, Basel
20:00	Gottardi (yellow card) 42'; Baumgartner (yellow card) 56'; Sitek 58' (1:4); Sitek 76' (2:4)	FCB summary	14' (0:1) Heldmann; 16' (0:2) Wassmer; (yellow card) 35' Meier; 50' (0:3) Aleksandrov; 56' (pen. 0:4) Sutter	Attendance: 2,500; Referee: (Switzerland) Peter Kellenberger
Note: Basel without Zbinden, Epars, Dittus, Jenzer (all injured) and Wagner (youth team). Aarau without Juchli, Komornicki, Fluri, and Koch (all injured).

30 May 1992 Round 14	Aarau	1–0	Locarno	Stadion Brügglifeld, Aarau
20:00	Wassmer 9' (1:0); Rossi (yellow card)	FCA summary		Attendance: 2,800; Referee: (Switzerland) Gottfried Friedrich (Seedorf, Uri)

==== League table Group A ====
Pos	Team	Pld	W	D	L	GF	GA	GD	Pts	Qualification
1	Lugano	14	8	6	0	25	8	+17	22	Remain in Nationalliga A 1992–93
2	Aarau	14	7	5	2	20	13	+7	19	Remain in Nationalliga A 1992–93
3	Yverdon-Sports	14	6	6	2	24	17	+7	18	Remain in Nationalliga B 1992–93
4	Basel	14	4	6	4	20	22	−2	14	Remain in Nationalliga B 1992–93
5	Baden	14	2	9	3	14	16	−2	13	Remain in Nationalliga B 1992–93
6	Locarno	14	3	4	7	19	19	0	10	Remain in Nationalliga B 1992–93
7	ES Malley	14	3	4	7	18	30	−12	10	License revoked Relegated to 1992–93 1. Liga
8	Bellinzona	14	2	2	10	14	29	−15	6	Remain in Nationalliga B 1992–93

Source: rsssf.com
Rules for classification: 1) Points; 2) Goal difference; 3) Goals scored; 4) Head-to-head points; 5) Away goals scored; 6) Draw.

=== Swiss Cup ===
The 1991–92 Swiss Cup was the 67th season of Switzerland's annual football cup competition. It began on 17 August with the first games of Round 1 and ended on Whit Monday 8 June 1992 with the Final held at Wankdorf, Bern. The winners earned a place in the first round of the Cup Winners' Cup. The 12 clubs from the NLA were granted byes for the first two rounds and they joined the competition in the third round. These teams were seeded and cound not be drawn against each other. The draw respected regionalities, when possible, and the lower classed team was granted home advantage.

29 September 1991 Round 3	Buochs	0–3	Aarau	Stadion Seefeld, Buochs
		FCA summary	19' (0:1) Komornicki; 75' (pen.) Sutter; 75' (0:3) Komornicki	Attendance: 1,500; Referee: (Switzerland) René Kellenberger (Herisau)

29 March 1992 Round 4	Baden	2–1	Aarau	Esp Stadium, Baden
	Wittmann 42' (1:1); Born 62' (2:1)	FCA summary	15' (0:1) Rossi	Attendance: 1,437; Referee: (Switzerland) Arturo Martino (Neukirch an der Thur)

Luzern won the cup and this was the club's second cup title to this date.

=== Friendly matches ===
==== Pre-season ====
13 July 1991 Exhibition game	Zürich	2–1	Aarau	Moos, Balsthal, Switzerland
	Makalakalane 14' (1:0); Di Jorio 69' (2:1)	FCZ summary	62' (1:1) Saibene	Attendance: 1,100; Referee: (Switzerland) René Gemperle (Bremgarten)
Note: Sempione-Cup, final

== Sources ==
- Switzerland 1991–92 at RSSSF
- FCA squad 1991–92 at arowa.ch

Preceded by 1990–91	FC Aarau seasons	Succeeded by 1992–93
