= Max Mayer =

Max Mayer may refer to

- Max Mayer (engineer), German engineer
- Max Mayer (filmmaker), American filmmaker
- Max Mayer (footballer), Swiss footballer

== See also ==
- Max Meyer, a disambiguation page
- Max Meier (born 1936), Swiss boxer
