= Mirko Pavličević =

Croatian footballer

Personal information
- Date of birth: 17 October 1965 (age 61)
- Position: Defender

Senior career*
Years	Team	Apps	(Gls)
1982–1986	Osijek		
1986–1987	Winterthur		
1987–1991	SV Schaffhausen		
1991–1992	FC Schaffhausen		
1992–2001	Aarau	304	(16)

International career
1994	Croatia	1	(0)
- * Club domestic league appearances and goals

Mirko Pavličević (born 17 October 1965) is a retired Croatian football defender.

== Club career ==
While at FC Aarau he played alongside future Chelsea star Roberto di Matteo, Polish playmaker Ryszard Komornicki and Bulgarian ace Petar Aleksandrov in the side that won the Swiss national title in 1992–93 and the club's last major trophy.

== International career ==
He made his debut for Croatia in an April 1994 friendly match away against Slovakia, it remained his sole international appearance.
