= Max Mayer (footballer) =

Swiss association football player

Personal information
- Position: Midfielder

Senior career*
Years	Team	Apps	(Gls)
1905–1910	Genoa	20	(5)
1910–1911	St Gallen	?	(?)
1911–1912	Basel	?	(?)
- * Club domestic league appearances and goals

Max Mayer was a Swiss footballer who played as midfielder.

== Career ==
Born in Switzerland, he moved to Italy to play for Genoa. For the Ligurian club, he played three seasons: 1905, 1906 and 1909–10. His debut for the club on 5 February 1905, in a 0–0 draw against Andrea Doria. In his first season with Genoa, he obtained the second place in the national group, and the third place the following season.

After three seasons of inactivity, he returned to Genoa in the 1909–10 season, obtaining the fourth place in the final group stage round.

After the experience in Liguria, he returned to Switzerland where he played for St. Gallen and Basel.

With St. Gallen, he obtained the third place in the Eastern Group of the 1910–11 Swiss Serie A.

The following season, he moved to Basel, with which he obtained the fifth place in the Central Group.
