= Nicola Sutter =

Swiss footballer (born 1995)

Personal information
- Date of birth: 8 May 1995 (age 31)
- Place of birth: Walkringen, Switzerland
- Height: 1.83 m (6 ft 0 in)
- Positions: Defensive midfielder; centre-back

Team information
- Current team: Lausanne Ouchy
- Number: 34

Youth career
- FC Thun
- –2013: FC Dürrenast

Senior career*
Years	Team	Apps	(Gls)
2013–2024	FC Thun	231	(11)
2016–2017	→ FC Winterthur (loan)	11	(0)
2025	AC Bellinzona	17	(2)
2025–	Lausanne Ouchy	32	(5)

International career
2015	Switzerland U20	3	(0)
2015	Switzerland U21	1	(0)
- * Club domestic league appearances and goals as of 26 May 2026

Nicola Sutter (born 8 May 1995) is a Swiss professional footballer who currently plays as a centre-back for Lausanne Ouchy.

== Club career ==
Sutter started playing football at the age of five. After playing for youth teams of FC Thun, he joined FC Dürrenast as a teenager, before moving back to Thun in 2013. On 16 February 2014, he debuted in the first team of Thun in the Swiss Super League, being substituted on for Adrian Nikçi after 83 minutes in a 3–1 defeat against FC Zürich. During the 2013–14 season, he appeared in four games in total for the first team and mostly played for the Thun U21 team in the 1. Liga, the fourth tier of the Swiss football league system. In summer 2014, he signed a professional contract with Thun. In the following 2013–14 season, he appeared in 18 league games for the first team.

Sutter was loaned out to second division club FC Winterthur for the 2016–17 season. After playing 11 league games and two Swiss Cup games until the winter break, he missed the start of the second half of the season due to an injury. The loan deal was ended prematurely, and Sutter moved back to Thun in March 2017.

While playing as a defensive midfielder until 2017, head coach Marc Schneider started calling Sutter up as a centre-back in the 2017–18 season. Since then, he has mostly appeared as a defender. He reached the final of the 2018–19 Swiss Cup with his team and appeared as a starting player in the final, but had to be substituted off in the 26th minute due to an injury. Thun lost the final 2–1 against FC Basel. At the end of the 2019–20 season, Thun was relegated to the Swiss Challenge League after losing in the relegation play-offs against FC Vaduz. In October 2020, Sutter was named team captain of FC Thun by head coach Carlos Bernegger.

In May 2022, he extended his contract with Thun until 2024.

== International career ==
In 2015, Sutter made three appearances for the Swiss under-20 team and one appearance for the Swiss under-21 team.

== Personal life ==
He is the son of René Sutter and the nephew of Alain Sutter, who are both former professional football players.
