= Max Meyer =

Max Meyer may refer to:

- Max Meyer (baseball) (born 1999), American baseball player
- Max Meyer (footballer) (born 1995), German footballer
- Max Friedrich Meyer (1873–1967), German-born American psychologist
- Max Meyer-Olbersleben (1850–1927), German composer and pianist
- Max Meyer (cycling team)

== See also ==
- Max Mayer (disambiguation)
- Max Meier (born 1936), Swiss boxer
