= Stefan Renggli =

Swiss footballer (born 1973)

Personal information
- Date of birth: 7 February 1973 (age 53)
- Position: Midfielder

Senior career*
Years	Team	Apps	(Gls)
1992–1993	FC Sursee		
1993–1994	FC Aarau		
1994–1996	FC Luzern		
- * Club domestic league appearances and goals

Stefan Renggli (born 7 February 1973) is a retired Swiss football midfielder.
