= Giuseppe Manfreda =

Swiss footballer (born 1969)

Personal information
- Date of birth: 4 January 1969 (age 57)
- Position: Forward

Senior career*
Years	Team	Apps	(Gls)
1986–1991	FC Lugano		
1991–1992	FC Sion		
1992–1994	Neuchâtel Xamax		
1994–1997	FC Lugano		
1997–1998	FC Locarno		
1998	Treviso		
1999–2000	Livorno		
2000–2001	AC Bellinzona		
2001–2002	FC Chiasso		
2003–2004	FC Lugano		
- * Club domestic league appearances and goals

Giuseppe Manfreda (born 4 January 1969) is a retired Swiss football striker.
