= César Silvera =

Uruguayan footballer (born 1971)

Personal information
- Full name: César Fernando Silvera Fontela
- Date of birth: 6 May 1971 (age 55)
- Place of birth: Montevideo, Uruguay
- Height: 1.74 m (5 ft 9 in)
- Position: Midfielder

Senior career*
Years	Team	Apps	(Gls)
1991–1994	Peñarol		
1994–1995	Ferro Carril Oeste		
1996	Villarreal	0	(0)
1996	Olimpia		
1997	Unión Española	1	(0)
1997	Lugano	8	(1)
1998–1999	Tacuary		
2000	Villa Española		
2000–2003	Maccabi Herzliya		
2003–2004	Brasil de Pelotas		
2004	Pogoń Szczecin	2	(1)
2006–2007	Brasil de Pelotas		
- * Club domestic league appearances and goals

César Fernando Silvera Fontela (born 7 May 1971) is a Uruguayan former professional footballer who played as a midfielder.
