= Lionel Martin (footballer) =

Swiss footballer (born 1974)

Personal information
- Date of birth: 21 July 1974 (age 52)
- Height: 1.75 m (5 ft 9 in)
- Position: Defender

Senior career*
Years	Team	Apps	(Gls)
1992–1998	Neuchâtel Xamax		
1998–2000	Bellinzona		
2000–2001	Vevey Sports		
2001–2003	FC Bex		
2003–2005	FC Bulle		
2005–2009	FC La Tour/Le Pâquier		

Managerial career
- 2011: FC La Tour/Le Pâquier
- 2014–2015: FC Monthey
- * Club domestic league appearances and goals

Lionel Martin (born 21 July 1974) is a Swiss former professional footballer who played as a defender.
