= Daniel Rupf (footballer, born 1967) =

Swiss footballer

Personal information
- Date of birth: 25 April 1967 (age 59)
- Position: Defender

Senior career*
| Years | Team | Apps | (Gls) |
| 1989–1992 | FC Wettingen | | |
| 1992–1993 | FC Aarau | | |
| 1993–1996 | FC Winterthur | | |
- * Club domestic league appearances and goals

Daniel Rupf (born 25 April 1967) is a retired Swiss football defender.

While at FC Aarau he was part of the side that won the Swiss national title in 1992–93.
