= Urs Birrer =

Swiss footballer (born 1961)

Personal information
- Date of birth: 4 September 1961 (age 65)
- Height: 1.80 m (5 ft 11 in)
- Position: Defender

Senior career*
Years	Team	Apps	(Gls)
1982–1983	FC Willisau		
1983–1993	FC Luzern		

International career
- Switzerland U21
1988–1989	Switzerland	3	(0)
- * Club domestic league appearances and goals

Urs Birrer (born 4 September 1961) is a retired Swiss football defender.
