= Salvatore Romano (footballer) =

Italian footballer

Personal information
- Date of birth: 15 October 1967 (age 59)
- Position: Forward

Senior career*
Years	Team	Apps	(Gls)
1985–1988	FC Zurich		
1988–1992	FC Wettingen		
1992–1994	FC Aarau		
1994–1996	FC Lausanne-Sport		
1996–1998	FC Muri		
1998–2000	FC Wohlen		
2000–2001	FC Aarau		
- * Club domestic league appearances and goals

Salvatore Romano (born 15 October 1967) is a retired Italian football striker.

While at FC Aarau he was part of the side that won the Swiss national title in 1992–93.
