= Stefan Marini =

Swiss footballer (born 1965)

Personal information
- Date of birth: 23 June 1965 (age 61)
- Height: 1.71 m (5 ft 7 in)
- Position: Defender

Team information
- Current team: Switzerland U17 (manager)

Senior career*
Years	Team	Apps	(Gls)
1983–1993	FC Luzern		
1993–1994	FC Aarau		

International career
1986–1991	Switzerland	19	(0)

Managerial career
- 1994–1995: FC Thun
- 1995–1997: SC Cham
- 2001–2003: SC Buochs
- 2003–2008: SC Kriens
- 2010–2013: FC Sursee
- 2013–2014: Switzerland U15
- 2014–2015: Switzerland U16
- 2015–2016: Switzerland U17
- 2016–2017: Switzerland U15
- 2017–: Switzerland U17
- * Club domestic league appearances and goals

Stefan Marini (born 23 June 1965 in Luzern, Switzerland) is a retired Swiss football defender and later manager. He debuted for FC Luzern on 30 April 1983 and retired from FC Aarau on 27 March 1994. Marini started his managerial career with FC Thun on 1 July 1994. His preferred formation in football is the 4-4-2 formation.
