= Erik-Jan van den Boogaard =

Dutch footballer (born 1964)

Personal information
- Date of birth: 19 August 1964 (age 62)
- Place of birth: Amsterdam, Netherlands
- Height: 1.87 m (6 ft 2 in)
- Position: Striker

Youth career
- VV Geldrop

Senior career*
Years	Team	Apps	(Gls)
1982–1985	PSV	47	(15)
1985–1987	MVV	56	(17)
1987–1990	Rennes	83	(42)
1990–1991	Rouen	26	(10)
1991–1992	Lausanne Sports	46	(14)
Total		258	(98)

International career
1980	Netherlands U16	4	(0)
1983-1985	Netherlands U21	7	(1)
- * Club domestic league appearances and goals

Erik-Jan van den Boogaard (born 19 August 1964) is a Dutch retired footballer who played as a striker.

== Club career ==
He played in the Netherlands for PSV, but was in the pecking order behind the likes of prolific strikers Hallvar Thoresen and Jurrie Koolhof so moved and got relegated to the Eerste Divisie with MVV in 1986, before a surprise move to France with Rennes where he became a club hero after shooting them to Ligue 1 in 1990. He was then sold for financial reasons to FC Rouen and finished his career prematurely in Switzerland with Lausanne Sports.

== International career ==
Van den Boogaard played 4 games for the Netherlands national under-21 football team and was a member of the Dutch squad at the 1983 FIFA World Youth Championship, featuring in two matches as a late sub.
