= René Sutter =

Swiss footballer (born 1966)

Personal information
- Date of birth: 5 January 1966 (age 60)
- Position: Midfielder

Youth career
- SC Bümpliz 78

Senior career*
Years	Team	Apps	(Gls)
1984–1985	SC Bümpliz 78		
1985–1990	Young Boys	109	(9)
1990–1993	FC Aarau	89	(13)
1993–1996	Young Boys	76	(7)
1996	Yverdon-Sport	14	(1)
1996–1999	FC Baden	95	(15)
1999–2001	FC Wil 1900	42	(8)
2001	FC Baden	7	(0)
2001–2002	SC Bümpliz 78		
2002–2003	FC Solothurn		

International career
1989	Switzerland	2	(0)
- * Club domestic league appearances and goals

René Sutter (born 5 January 1966) is a Swiss former footballer who played as a midfielder.

== Club career ==
Sutter started playing football at the age of eight at FC Bümpliz, which later became SC Bümpliz 78. In the 1984−85 season, he started playing for their first team in the 2. Liga, which at the time was the fourth highest division in the Swiss football league system. In 1985, he signed for first division club Young Boys, where he stayed for five years. With the club, he won the Swiss Championship at the end the 1985−86 season, and lifted the Swiss Cup in 1987. In 1990, he moved to league rival FC Aarau, where he was part of the side that won the Swiss national title in 1992–93 under manager Rolf Fringer. In 1993, he returned to the Young Boys. In the later years of his career, Sutter played for Yverdon-Sport, FC Baden and FC Wil 1900, before returning to his youth club SC Bümpliz in 2001. After one season at FC Solothurn, he retired from professional football in 2003.

== International career ==
In 1989, Sutter earned his only two caps for the Switzerland national team. His first game was on 7 June 1989 against Czechoslovakia, where he appeared as a starter, before being substituted by Kubilay Türkyilmaz in the 58th minute. His team lost the game 1–0. Two weeks later, he made his second and final appearance for Switzerland, when we was brought on as a substitute in the 56th minute in a friendly game against Brazil. The game ended in a surprising 1–0 victory for Switzerland.

== Personal life ==
After his retirement from professional football, Sutter studied law, today he works as a legal professional for an institution of the Swiss government.

He is the brother of former Swiss national footballer Alain Sutter and the father of Swiss footballer Nicola Sutter.

== Honours ==
Young Boys

- Swiss Championship: 1985–86
- Swiss Cup: 1986–87

FC Aarau

- Swiss Championship: 1992–93
