= Thomas Wyss =

Swiss footballer (born 1966)

Personal information
- Date of birth: 29 August 1966 (age 60)
- Position: Midfielder

Senior career*
Years	Team	Apps	(Gls)
- FC Aarau
- FC Luzern
1990s	Grasshoppers		
- FC St. Gallen

International career
1990s	Switzerland	11	

Managerial career
- 2003-2005: Zug 94
- * Club domestic league appearances and goals

Thomas Wyss (born 29 August 1966) is a retired Swiss football midfielder.

He earned 11 caps for the Swiss national team and was in the Swiss squad at the 1994 FIFA World Cup.

He was manager of Zug 94 between July 2003 and June 2005.

== Honours ==
=== Player ===
Grasshoppers

- Swiss Championship: 1989–90
- Swiss Cup: 1989–90
- Swiss Super Cup: 1989
