= Rolf Meier =

Swiss footballer (born 1969)

Personal information
- Date of birth: 26 April 1969 (age 57)
- Position: Midfielder

Senior career*
| Years | Team | Apps | (Gls) |
| 1988–1993 | FC Aarau | | |
| 1993–1994 | FC St. Gallen | | |
| 1994–1996 | FC Baden | | |
| 1996–2000 | FC Wangen bei Olten | | |
| 2000–2001 | FC Wohlen | | |
- * Club domestic league appearances and goals

Rolf Meier (born 26 April 1969) is a retired Swiss football midfielder.

While at FC Aarau he was part of the side that won the Swiss national title in 1992–93.
