= Walter Fernandez =

Swiss footballer (born 1965)

Personal information
- Date of birth: 20 August 1965 (age 61)
- Place of birth: Lausanne, Switzerland
- Height: 1.80 m (5 ft 11 in)
- Position: Left back

Senior career*
Years	Team	Apps	(Gls)
1983–1990	FC Lausanne-Sport	119	(5)
1990–1993	Neuchâtel Xamax	79	(6)
1993–1995	FC Lugano	78	(4)
1995–1997	Servette FC	42	(2)
1997–2000	FC Lugano	95	(5)
Total		413	(22)

International career
1995	Switzerland	3	(1)
- * Club domestic league appearances and goals

Walter Fernandez (born 20 August 1965) is a retired Swiss football defender.

== Career ==
He was born in Lausanne, and made his debut in the Swiss first tier for FC Lausanne-Sport. Originally a left winger, he was repurposed as a left back by manager Umberto Barberis in Servette FC. Fernandez was also given the chance in the Swiss national team. He played when Lugano eliminated Inter Milan from the 1995–96 UEFA Cup.

Joining Lugano for the second time, the team found themselves in the 1997–98 Nationalliga A, but won promotion. He lost his place in the team after the arrival of Roberto Morinini. Fernandez retired and became a player agent.

== Personal life ==
His father was Spanish, while his mother was Italian.

== Career statistics ==
=== International ===
Appearances and goals by national team and year
National team	Year	Apps	Goals
Switzerland	1995	3	1
Total		3	1

Scores and results list Switzerland's goal tally first, score column indicates score after each Fernandez goal.

List of international goals scored by Walter Fernandez
No.	Date	Venue	Opponent	Score	Result	Competition
1	8 March 1995	Olympic Stadium, Athens, Greece	Greece	1–0	1–1	Friendly

== Honours ==
Neuchâtel Xamax

- Swiss Super Cup: 1990
