= Pascal Thüler =

Swiss footballer (born 1970)

Personal information
- Date of birth: 10 January 1970 (age 56)
- Positions: Defender; midfielder

Senior career*
Years	Team	Apps	(Gls)
1988–1993	FC St. Gallen		
1993–1998	Grasshopper Club		
1998	MSV Duisburg		
1999–2001	FC St. Gallen		
2001–2002	SW Bregenz		
2002	FC Vaduz		
2002–2003	FC Kreuzlingen		

International career
- Switzerland u-21
1994–1997	Switzerland	6	(1)
- * Club domestic league appearances and goals

Pascal Thüler (born 10 January 1970) is a retired Swiss football defender.
