= Heribert Koch =

Swiss footballer (born 1969)

Personal information
- Date of birth: 8 February 1969 (age 57)
- Position: Defender

Senior career*
Years	Team	Apps	(Gls)
1986–1995	FC Aarau		
1995–1998	FC St. Gallen		
1998–2000	SW Bregenz		
2000–2002	FC Vaduz		
- * Club domestic league appearances and goals

Heribert Koch (born 8 February 1969) is a retired Swiss football defender.
