= Thomas Käslin =

Swiss footballer (born 1967)

Personal information
- Date of birth: 7 February 1967 (age 59)
- Place of birth: Affoltern am Albis
- Position: Midfielder

Senior career*
Years	Team	Apps	(Gls)
1986–1988	FC Zug		
1988–1992	FC Chiasso		
1992–1994	FC Lugano		
1994–1996	FC Lausanne-Sport		
1996–1997	FC Chiasso		
- * Club domestic league appearances and goals

Thomas Käslin (born 7 February 1967) is a retired Swiss football midfielder.
