= 1911–12 Swiss Serie A =

Swiss football season

Swiss Serie A
- Season: 1911–12

Statistics of Swiss Super League in the 1911–12 season.

== East ==
=== Table ===
Pos	Team	Pld	W	D	L	GF	GA	GD	Pts
1	FC Aarau	14	10	2	2	41	18	+23	22
2	Brühl St. Gallen	14	10	2	2	56	28	+28	22
3	FC St. Gallen	14	8	3	3	38	18	+20	19
4	FC Zürich	14	9	0	5	39	29	+10	18
5	Young Fellows Zürich	14	7	0	7	40	30	+10	14
6	FC Winterthur	14	5	1	8	32	28	+4	11
7	FC Baden	14	2	1	11	19	59	−40	5
8	FC Lucerne	14	0	1	13	16	71	−55	1

Source: rsssf

== Central ==
=== Table ===
Pos	Team	Pld	W	D	L	GF	GA	GD	Pts
1	Etoile La Chaux-de-Fonds	14	12	0	2	38	19	+19	24
2	Old Boys Basel	14	11	1	2	45	19	+26	23
3	FC La Chaux-de-Fonds	14	9	0	5	53	29	+24	18
4	Young Boys Bern	14	6	0	8	31	25	+6	12
5	FC Basel	14	5	2	7	30	34	−4	12
6	Nordstern Basel	14	4	2	8	21	36	−15	10
7	FC Bern	14	4	2	8	21	38	−17	10
8	FC Biel	14	1	1	12	19	58	−39	3

Source: rsssf

== West ==
=== Table ===
Pos	Team	Pld	W	D	L	GF	GA	GD	Pts
1	Servette Genf	12	10	2	0	49	11	+38	22
2	Cantonal Neuchatel	12	8	2	2	34	13	+21	18
3	FC Genf	12	6	3	3	25	18	+7	15
4	Lausanne Sports	12	5	2	5	23	18	+5	12
5	Montreux Narcisse	12	2	3	7	22	36	−14	7
6	Stella Fribourg	12	3	1	8	17	36	−19	7
7	Concordia Yverdon	12	1	1	10	15	53	−38	3

Source: rsssf

== Final ==
=== Table ===
Pos	Team	Pld	W	D	L	GF	GA	GD	Pts
1	FC Aarau	2	2	0	0	8	2	+6	4
2	Etoile La Chaux-de-Fonds	2	1	0	1	4	4	0	2
3	Servette Genf	2	0	0	2	2	8	−6	0

Source: rsssf

=== Results ===
Team 1	Score	Team 2
19 May 1912
Étoile-Sporting	3–1	Servette
2 June 1912
Aarau	5–1	Servette
9 June 1912
Aarau	3–1	Étoile-Sporting

FC Aarau won the championship.

== Sources ==
- Switzerland 1911-12 at RSSSF
