= Marcel Heldmann =

Swiss footballer (born 1966)

Personal information
- Date of birth: 9 December 1966 (age 59)
- Place of birth: Aarau, Switzerland
- Height: 1.81 m (5 ft 11 in)
- Position: Midfielder

Senior career*
Years	Team	Apps	(Gls)
1987–1991	FC Wettingen	117	(17)
1992–2000	FC Aarau	190	(32)
2000–2002	FC Zürich	34	(1)
2002–2003	FC Baden	40	(3)
2003–2004	FC Wangen bei Olten	6	(0)
Total		387	(53)

International career
1989–1992	Switzerland	6	(0)
- * Club domestic league appearances and goals

Marcel Heldmann (born 9 December 1966) is a retired Swiss football midfielder.

While at FC Aarau he was part of the side that won the Swiss national title in 1992–93.
