= Peter Schepull =

Swiss footballer (1964–2026)

Personal information
- Date of birth: 7 June 1964
- Place of birth: Rapperswil, Switzerland
- Date of death: 27 May 2026 (aged 61)
- Height: 1.81 m (5 ft 11 in)
- Position: Defender

Senior career*
Years	Team	Apps	(Gls)
1983–1986	Grasshopper Club	27	(4)
1986–1987	FC Zug		
1987–1990	FC Wettingen	43	(0)
1990–1995	Servette	101	(6)

International career
1989–1992	Switzerland	22	(1)
- * Club domestic league appearances and goals

Peter Schepull (7 June 1964 – 27 May 2026) was a Swiss professional footballer who played as a defender. Schepull died on 27 May 2026, at the age of 61.
