= Bernd Kilian =

Swiss footballer (born 1965)

Personal information
- Date of birth: 15 December 1965 (age 60)
- Position: Defender

Senior career*
Years	Team	Apps	(Gls)
1985–1994	FC Aarau		
1994–1995	Grasshopper Club Zürich		
1995–1999	FC Aarau		
1999–2003	FC Wangen bei Olten		
- * Club domestic league appearances and goals

Bernd Kilian (born 15 December 1965) is a retired Swiss football defender.

== Professional career ==
While at FC Aarau, he was part of the side that won the Swiss national title in 1992–93.
