= Marc Hottiger =

Swiss footballer (born 1967)

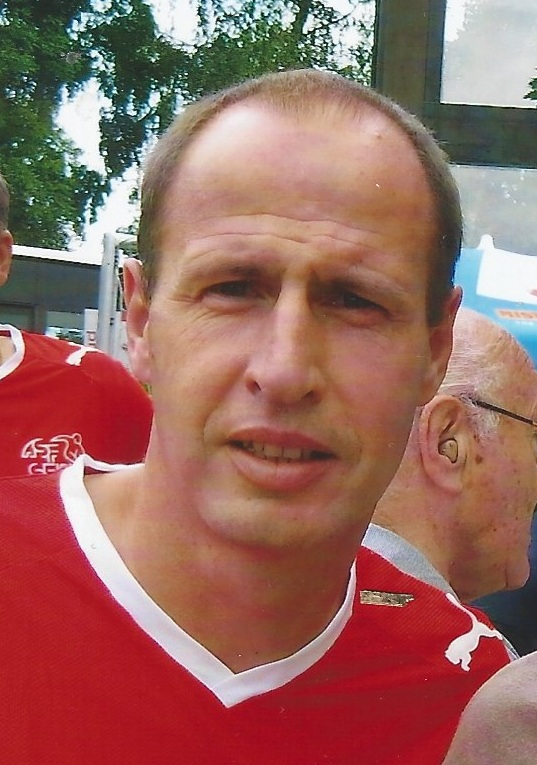

Personal information
- Date of birth: 7 November 1967 (age 58)
- Place of birth: Lausanne, Switzerland
- Height: 1.76 m (5 ft 9 in)
- Position: Right-back

Senior career*
Years	Team	Apps	(Gls)
1988–1992	Lausanne Sports	123	(5)
1992–1994	Sion	67	(13)
1994–1996	Newcastle United	39	(1)
1996–1997	Everton	17	(1)
1997–1999	Lausanne Sports	45	(1)
1999–2002	Sion	82	(1)
Total		373	(22)

International career
1989–1996	Switzerland	63	(5)
- * Club domestic league appearances and goals

Marc Hottiger (born 7 November 1967) is a Swiss former professional footballer who played as a right-back.

He notably had two separate spells with both Lausanne Sports and Sion, amassing over 300 appearances in the Nationalliga A. He also played in the Premier League for Newcastle United and Everton, from 1994 until 1997.

He was capped 63 times and scored five goals for the Swiss national team between 1989 and 1996. He was in the Swiss squad at the 1994 FIFA World Cup, playing all four games, as well as the 1996 UEFA European Championship.

== Career ==
Hottiger was born in Lausanne. After starting his club career in his native Switzerland, he headed for England on 1 August 1994 to sign for Premier League side Newcastle United in a £525,000 deal. He was their first choice right-back in the 1994–95 season, during which he memorably scored a 25-yard goal in a victory over Blackburn Rovers in the FA Cup third round. However, manager Kevin Keegan signed right-back Warren Barton from Wimbledon the following summer and Hottiger lost his place in the first team for the 1995–96 season.

On 19 January 1996, he agreed terms with Everton for a £700,000 transfer, but had difficulty obtaining a work permit, which was finally granted on 9 March 1996 when his long wait to become an Everton player ended. However, he only made limited appearances for Everton, scoring once against Bolton Wanderers, and left in June 1997 to sign for his hometown club Lausanne in a £25,000 deal. He then moved back to FC Sion in 1999 and remained there until the end of his playing career in 2002.

== Personal life ==
Hottiger has worked as the director of the Brad Friedel Premier Soccer Academes.

== Career statistics ==
Appearances and goals by club, season and competition
Club	Season			
Club	Season	Division	Apps	Goals
Lausanne Sports	1988–89	Nationalliga A	20	3
Lausanne Sports	1989–90	Nationalliga A	35	1
Lausanne Sports	1990–91	Nationalliga A	33	1
Lausanne Sports	1991–92	Nationalliga A	35	0
Lausanne Sports	Total		123	5
Sion	1992–93	Nationalliga A	32	7
Sion	1993–94	Nationalliga A	35	6
Sion	Total		67	13
Newcastle United	1994–95	Premier League	38	1
Newcastle United	1995–96	Premier League	1	0
Newcastle United	Total		39	1
Everton	1995–96	Premier League	9	1
Everton	1996–97	Premier League	8	0
Everton	Total		17	1
Lausanne Sports	1997–98	Nationalliga A	29	0
Lausanne Sports	1998–99	Nationalliga A	16	1
Lausanne Sports	Total		45	1
Sion	1999–00	Nationalliga A	14	0
Sion	2000–01	Nationalliga A	33	1
Sion	2001–02	Nationalliga A	35	0
Sion	Total		82	1
Career total			373	22
