= Harald Gämperle =

Swiss footballer (born 1968)

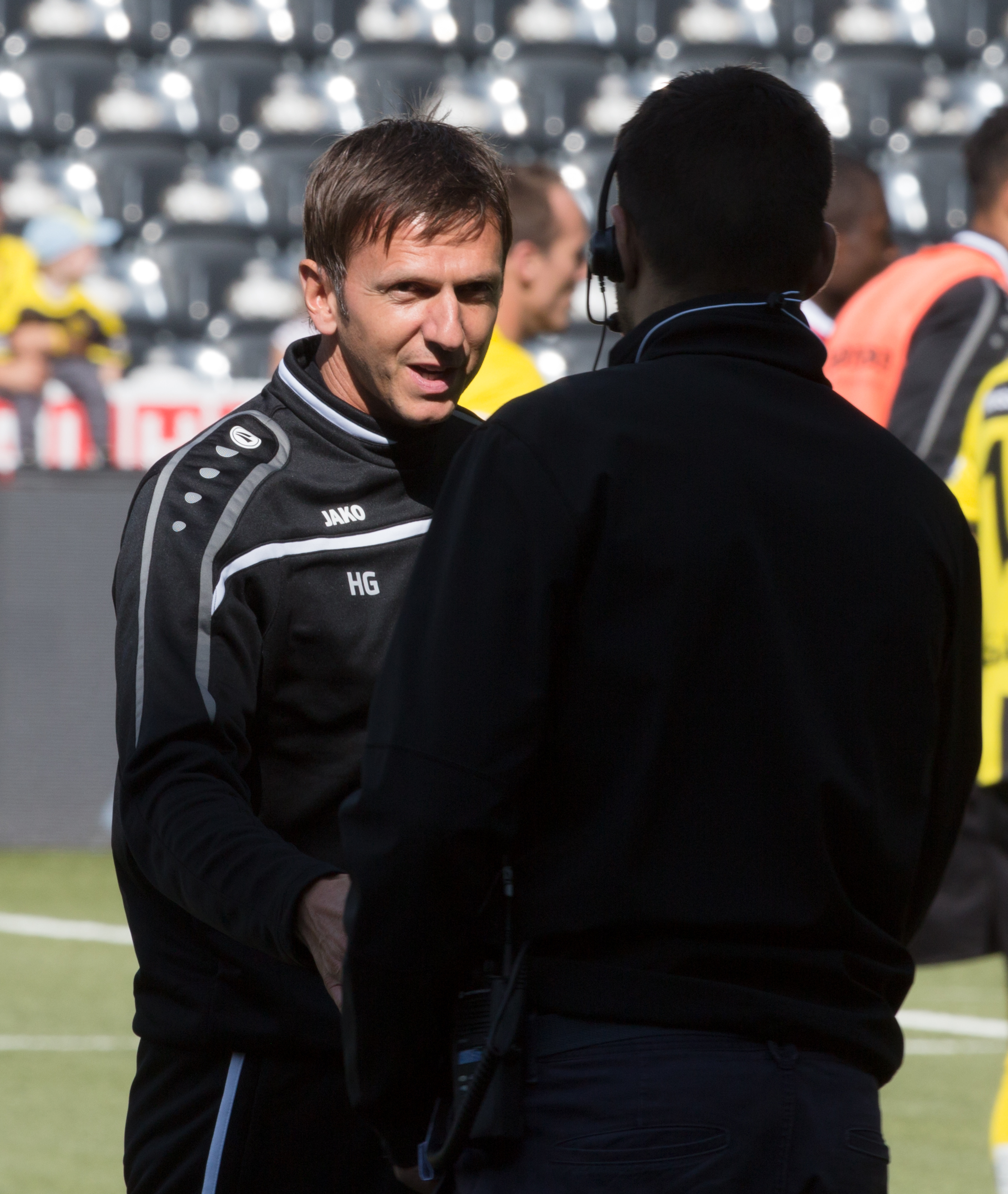
- Gämperle in 2014

Personal information
- Date of birth: 11 May 1968 (age 58)
- Place of birth: St. Gallen, Switzerland
- Height: 1.80 m (5 ft 11 in)
- Position: Defender

Youth career
- FC Bazenheid
- FC Kirchberg SG

Senior career*
Years	Team	Apps	(Gls)
1986-1990	St. Gallen	83	(4)
1990-1998	Grasshoppers	165	(4)
1998-2000	Neuchâtel Xamax	17	(0)

International career
1989-1995	Switzerland	4	(0)

Managerial career
- 2000–2003: Young Boys (assistant)
- 2003: FC Baden (assistant)
- 2004–2007: FC Zürich (assistant)
- 2007–2010: Hertha BSC (assistant)
- 2010–2012: FC Zürich (assistant)
- 2012: FC Zürich
- 2012–2013: FC Zürich (assistant)
- 2013–2015: Young Boys (assistant)
- 2015: Young Boys
- 2015–2019: Young Boys (assistant)
- 2019: Hertha BSC (assistant)
- 2022: Young Boys (assistant)
- 2022–: Al Ahly (assistant)
- * Club domestic league appearances and goals

Harald "Harry" Gämperle (born 11 May 1968) is a Swiss football coach and former player. He played as a defender.
