= Erich Hänzi =

Swiss footballer and manager (born 1965)

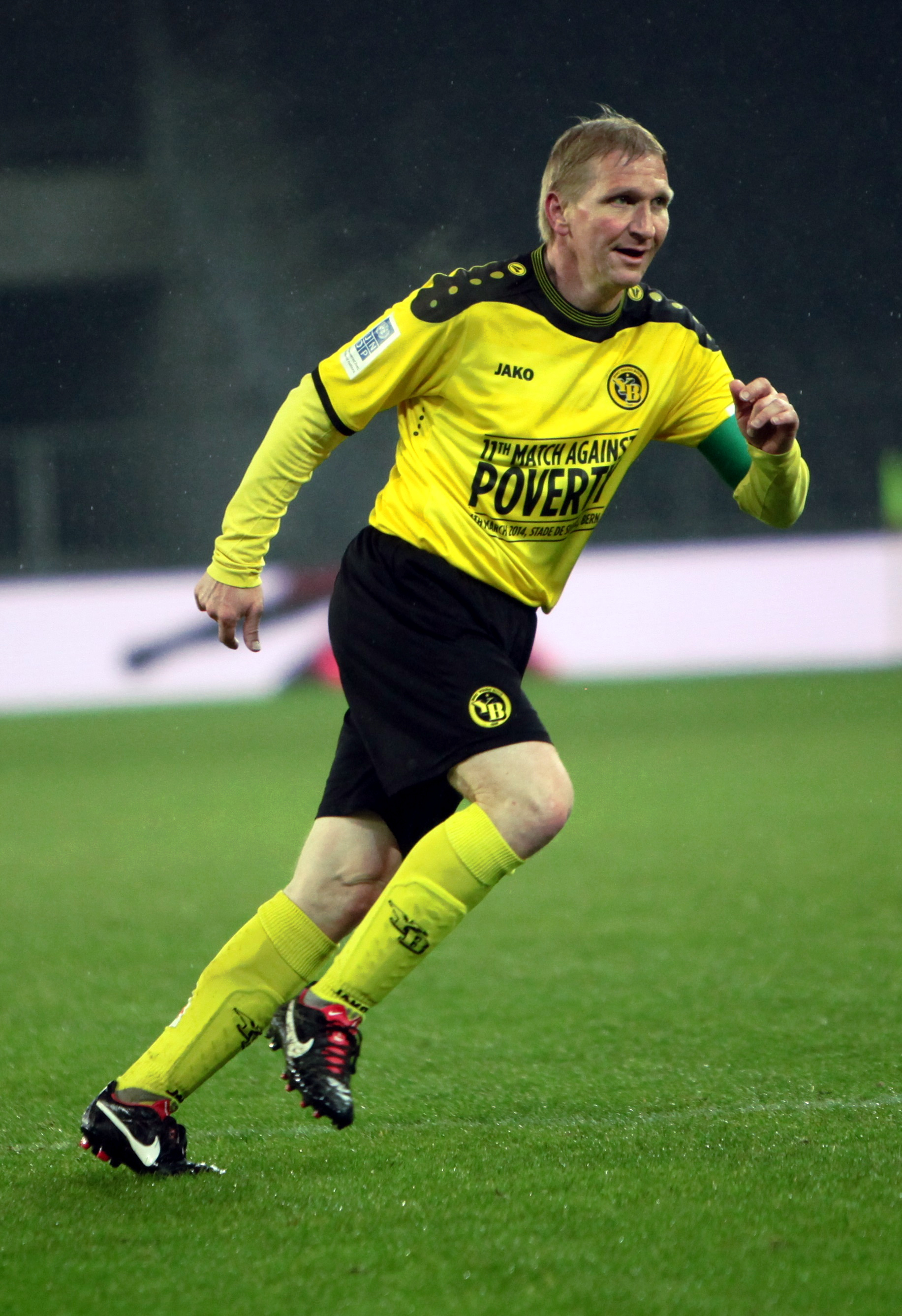
- Hänzi in 2014

Personal information
- Date of birth: 27 April 1965 (age 61)
- Position: Defender

Senior career*
| Years | Team | Apps | (Gls) |
| 1986–1993 | BSC Young Boys | | |
| 1993–2000 | FC Lausanne-Sport | | |
| 2000–2003 | BSC Young Boys | | |

Managerial career
- 2008–2013: FC Zürich (coach)
- 2014–2016: FC Zürich (coach)
- 2017–2018: BSC Young Boys (coach)
- * Club domestic league appearances and goals

Erich Hänzi (born 27 April 1965) is Swiss football manager and former player who played as a defender.
