= Daniele Penzavalli =

Swiss footballer (born 1968)

Personal information
- Date of birth: 8 November 1968 (age 57)
- Place of birth: Origlio
- Position: Defender

Senior career*
Years	Team	Apps	(Gls)
1987–1998	FC Lugano		
1998–1999	AC Bellinzona		
1999–2001	FC Locarno		

International career
- Switzerland u-21
- * Club domestic league appearances and goals

Daniele Penzavalli (born 8 November 1968) is a retired Swiss football defender.
