= Rolf Fringer =

Austrian football manager (born 1957)

Personal information
- Date of birth: 26 January 1957 (age 69)
- Place of birth: Adliswil, Switzerland
- Position: Defender

Senior career*
| Years | Team | Apps | (Gls) |
| 1980–1981 | CS Chênois | 18 | (2) |
| 1981–1983 | FC Luzern | 35 | (1) |
| 1983–1989 | SC Zug | | |
| 1986–1989 | Schaffhausen | | |

Managerial career
- 1990–1992: Schaffhausen
- 1992–1995: FC Aarau
- 1995–1996: VfB Stuttgart
- 1996–1997: Switzerland
- 1998–1999: Grasshoppers
- 2000–2002: FC Aarau
- 2003: Al-Wahda
- 2004: Apollon Limassol
- 2004–2005: PAOK
- 2006–2007: St. Gallen
- 2008–2011: FC Luzern
- 2012: FC Zürich
- * Club domestic league appearances and goals

Rolf Fringer (born 26 January 1957) is an Austrian football manager and former player. He has managed the Switzerland national team and numerous Swiss football clubs.

== Career ==
Fringer led FC Aarau to the 1992–93 Swiss national title. At FC Luzern he was known for his counterattacking football. He was replaced as Luzern manager by Murat Yakin.

In April 2012 it was announced that Rolf Fringer would join FC Zürich as manager in summer 2012. When he was appointed he stated that it was his proudest day as he was an FCZ fan as a child. His first transfer as manager was to sign Burim Kukeli, whom he had managed at FC Luzern. On 26 November it was announced following a board meeting to relieve Fringer of his duties, with FC Zürich sitting at 7th in the Super League.
