= Walter Müller (footballer, born 1970) =

Swiss footballer

Personal information
- Date of birth: 27 August 1970 (age 56)
- Position: Goalkeeper

Senior career*
Years	Team	Apps	(Gls)
1992–1996	FC Aarau		
- * Club domestic league appearances and goals

Walter Müller (born 27 August 1970) is a retired Swiss football goalkeeper.
