= René Fluri =

Swiss footballer (born 1968)

Personal information
- Date of birth: 27 March 1968 (age 58)
- Position: Defender

Senior career*
Years	Team	Apps	(Gls)
1984–1986	FC Grenchen		
1986–1987	Neuchâtel Xamax		
1987–1988	FC Grenchen		
1988–1989	FC Bulle		
1989–1991	FC Locarno		
1991–1992	FC Aarau		
1993–1996	FC Locarno		
1996–1997	FC Biel-Bienne		
1997–2000	FC Solothurn		
2000–2002	FC Grenchen		
2002–2003	FC Solothurn		
- * Club domestic league appearances and goals

René Fluri (born 27 March 1968) is a retired Swiss football defender.
