= Seedorf, Uri =

Seedorf
- Municipality
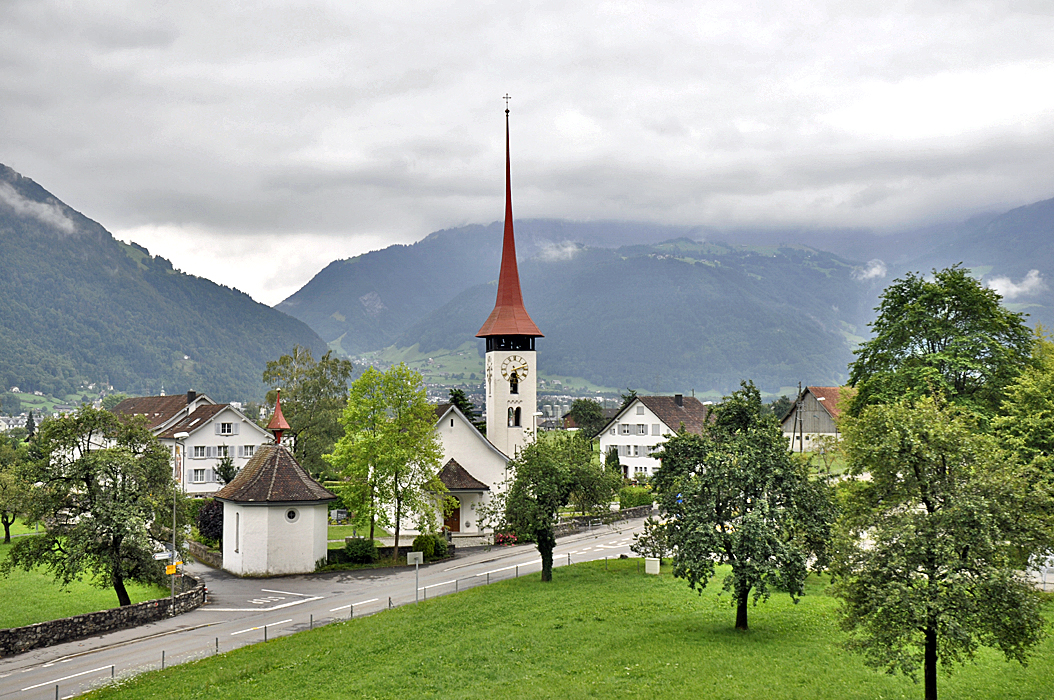

- Flag Coat of arms
- Location of Seedorf
- Location within Switzerland Location within Canton of Uri
- Coordinates: 46°52′N 8°36′E
- Country: Switzerland
- Canton: Uri
- District: n.a.

Area
  - Total: 15.64 km^{2} (6.04 sq mi)
- Elevation: 452 m (1,483 ft)

Population (December 2020)
  - Total: 1,876
  - Density: 119.9/km^{2} (310.7/sq mi)
- Time zone: UTC+01:00 (CET)
  - Summer (DST): UTC+02:00 (CEST)
- Postal code: 6462
- SFOS number: 1214
- ISO 3166 code: CH-UR
- Surrounded by: Altdorf, Attinghausen, Flüelen, Isenthal
- Website: www.seedorf-uri.ch

Seedorf (Swiss Standard German pronunciation: [ˈzeːdɔrf]) is a municipality in the canton of Uri in Switzerland. On 1 January 2021 the former municipality of Bauen merged into the municipality of Seedorf.

== History ==
The municipality was first mentioned in 1254 as Sedorf.

=== Bauen ===
Bauen is first mentioned in 1150 as Bawen.

== Geography ==
Aerial view (1957)

Seedorf has an area, (as of the 2004/09 survey) of 19.28 km^{2} (7.44 sq mi). Of this area, about 17.3% is used for agricultural purposes, while 42.5% is forested. Of the rest of the land, 5.6% is settled (buildings or roads) and 34.5% is unproductive land.

In the 2004/09 survey a total of 37 ha (91 acres) or about 2.4% of the total area was covered with buildings, an increase of 15 ha (37 acres) over the 1981/84 amount. Over the same time period, the amount of recreational space in the municipality increased by 5 ha (12 acres) and is now about 0.65% of the total area.

Of the agricultural land, 2 ha (4.9 acres) is used for orchards and vineyards, 133 ha (330 acres) is fields and grasslands and 146 ha (360 acres) consists of alpine grazing areas. Since 1981/84 the amount of agricultural land has decreased by 24 ha (59 acres). Over the same time period the amount of forested land has increased by 16 ha (40 acres).

Rivers and lakes cover 31 ha (77 acres) in the municipality.

== Demographics ==
Seedorf has a population (as of December 2020) of 1,876. As of 2017, 6.4% of the population are resident foreign nationals. Over the last 7 years (2010-2017) the population has changed at a rate of 3.56%. The birth rate in the municipality, in 2017, was 10.6, while the death rate was 9.4 per thousand residents.

As of 2017, children and teenagers (0–19 years old) make up 27.1% of the population, while adults (20–64 years old) are 58.0% of the population and seniors (over 64 years old) make up 14.9%. In 2015 there were 781 single residents, 885 people who were married or in a civil partnership, 65 widows or widowers and 76 divorced residents.

In 2017 there were 678 private households in Seedorf with an average household size of 2.64 persons. In 2015 about 58.7% of all buildings in the municipality were single family homes, which is greater than the percentage in the canton (49.2%) and about the same as the percentage nationally (57.4%). Of the 377 inhabited buildings in the municipality, in 2000, about 54.9% were single family homes and 32.4% were multiple family buildings. Additionally, about 7.7% of the buildings were built before 1919, while 17.5% were built between 1991 and 2000. In 2016 the rate of construction of new housing units per 1000 residents was 1.66. The vacancy rate for the municipality, in 2018, was 1.8%.

== Historic Population ==
The historical population is given in the following chart:

== Heritage sites of national significance ==
The Benedictine nuns convent of St. Lazarus and Apro Castle are listed as Swiss heritage sites of national significance.

== Economy ==
Seedorf was classed in the 2000 census as a semi-tourism focused municipality and in 2012 was classed as a medium-density industry focused peri-urban municipality. The municipality is part of the agglomeration of Altdorf (UR).

As of 2016, there were a total of 631 people employed in the municipality. Of these, a total of 28 people worked in 13 businesses in the primary economic sector. The secondary sector employed 304 workers in 28 separate businesses. Finally, the tertiary sector provided 299 jobs in 67 businesses.

In 2017 a total of 1.7% of the population received social assistance. In 2011 the unemployment rate in the municipality was 0.5%.

In 2015 the average cantonal, municipal and church tax rate in the municipality for a couple with two children making SFr 80,000 was 5.1% while the rate for a single person making SFr 150,000 was 11%, both of which are much lower than the average for the canton. The canton has a slightly higher than average tax rate for those making SFr 80,000 and one of the lowest for those making SFr 150,000. In 2013 the average income in the municipality per tax payer was SFr 72,799 and the per person average was SFr 25,444, which is greater than the cantonal averages of SFr 67,286 but less than the per person amount of SFr 27,772. In contrast, the national tax payer average is SFr 82,682, while the per person average is SFr 35,825.

== Politics ==
In the 2019 Swiss federal election the most popular party was the CVP with 47.7% of the vote. The next two most popular parties were the SVP (35.0%) and the SP (16.2%). In the federal election, a total of 674 votes were cast, and the voter turnout was 51.5%. The 2019 election saw a large change in the voting when compared to 2015. The percentage of the vote received by the CVP increased sharply from 24.3% in 2015 to 47.7% in 2019 and the SP increased from 0.0% to 16.2%, while the percentage that the SVP received dropped from 46.9% to 35.0%.
