= Ryszard Komornicki =

Polish footballer

Personal information
- Date of birth: 14 August 1959 (age 67)
- Place of birth: Ścinawa, Poland
- Height: 1.83 m (6 ft 0 in)
- Positions: Winger; attacking midfielder

Senior career*
Years	Team	Apps	(Gls)
1979–1980	Kryształ Stronie Śląskie		
1980–1982	GKS Tychy		
1983–1989	Górnik Zabrze	182	(35)
1989–1994	Aarau	121	(11)
1998–1999	Wohlen		
2000–2001	Kickers Luzern		
Total		303	(46)

International career
1984–1988	Poland	20	(0)

Managerial career
- 1998–1999: Wohlen (player-coach)
- 1999–2000: Solothurn
- 2000–2001: Kickers Luzern (player-coach)
- 2001: Luzern
- 2002–2005: Zürich U21
- 2006: Górnik Zabrze
- 2006–2007: Baden
- 2007–2009: Aarau
- 2009: Górnik Zabrze
- 2010: Wil
- 2011–2012: El Gouna
- 2012: Wohlen
- 2012–2013: Luzern
- 2013: Chiasso
- 2014–2015: FC United Zürich
- 2018: FC Olten
- 2019: Siarka Tarnobrzeg
- 2020: GKS Tychy
- 2020–2021: 1.FC Kaiserslautern (assistant)
- 2021–2023: Wohlen
- 2023: FC 08 Villingen
- * Club domestic league appearances and goals

Ryszard Komornicki (born 14 August 1959) is a Polish football manager and former player who played as a winger or an attacking midfielder. He was most recently in charge of German club FC 08 Villingen.

== Playing career ==
Born in Ścinawa, Lower Silesia, Komornicki played for GKS Tychy and Górnik Zabrze in his country, winning four Ekstraklasa championships in a row with the latter club, then moved to Switzerland at the age of 30 where he represented FC Aarau, FC Wohlen and FC Kickers Luzern. He acted as player-coach to the last two teams, retiring at nearly 42. While at FC Aarau he was part of the side that won the Swiss national title in 1992–93.

Komornicki won 20 caps for the Poland national team in almost four years and was a participant at the 1986 FIFA World Cup, appearing in all three group stage matches (one win, one loss and one draw). He made his debut on 31 October 1984, featuring 20 minutes in a 2–2 friendly draw against Albania in Mielec.

== Managerial career ==
Komornicki took up coaching in 1998, going on to be in charge of a host of Swiss clubs for more than 15 years (including Aarau and Wohlen). Interspersed with this, he had two spells with Górnik and worked with El Gouna FC of the Egyptian Premier League in the 2011–12 season.

On 10 July 2019, Komornicki was appointed as the sporting director of GKS Tychy.

== Honours ==
=== Player ===
Górnik Zabrze

- Ekstraklasa: 1984–85, 1985–86, 1986–87, 1987–88
- Polish Super Cup: 1988

Aarau

- Nationalliga A: 1992–93
