= Petar Aleksandrov =

Bulgarian footballer and coach

Personal information
- Full name: Petar Aleksandrov Aleksandrov
- Date of birth: 7 December 1962 (age 63)
- Place of birth: Karlovo, Bulgaria PR
- Height: 1.77 m (5 ft 10 in)
- Position: Striker

Team information
- Current team: FC Zürich (Assistant manager)

Senior career*
Years	Team	Apps	(Gls)
1981–1982	Levski Karlovo	26	(10)
1982–1989	Slavia Sofia	173	(100)
1989–1990	Kortrijk	18	(4)
1990–1991	Energie Cottbus	18	(2)
1991–1993	FC Aarau	85	(37)
1994	Levski Sofia	12	(10)
1994–1995	Neuchâtel Xamax	30	(24)
1995–1997	Luzern	55	(29)
1998	Baden	13	(4)
1998–2000	FC Aarau	28	(6)
2000–2001	Kickers Luzern		
2001–2002	Blue Star Zürich		
Total		458	(226)

International career
1986–1994	Bulgaria	25	(5)

Managerial career
- 2002–2004: Aarau U21
- 2004–2005: PAOK (assistant)
- 2006–2007: St. Gallen (assistant)
- 2007: Grasshopper (assistant)
- 2008–2009: Bulgaria (assistant)
- 2008–2011: Luzern (assistant)
- 2016: Biel-Bienne
- 2017–: FC Zürich (assistant)
- * Club domestic league appearances and goals

Petar Aleksandrov Aleksandrov (Bulgarian: Петър Александров Александров; born 7 December 1962) is a Bulgarian football coach and former player.

As a footballer Aleksandrov played for various clubs in Bulgaria, Belgium, Germany and Switzerland during the 1980s and 1990s. He was a striker, noted for his goal-scoring ability. Aleksandrov was capped 25 times for the Bulgaria national team, scoring 5 goals, and played in the 1994 FIFA World Cup.

== Club career ==
Born in Karlovo, Aleksandrov started playing professionally with home-town club Levski Karlovo in 1981 before moving to PFC Slavia Sofia a year later. He played at Slavia for seven years and helped the club win the Balkans Cup in 1986 and 1988, and secure third-placed finishes in 1982 and 1986. For Slavia Aleksandrov played in 173 matches and scored 100 goals. In 1989, he signed for the Belgian First Division's K.V. Kortrijk where his form earned him a move to FC Energie Cottbus of East Germany in 1990. He struggled there, however, and moved on to FC Aarau in the Swiss Super League after just one season. He was a major success at Aarau before he made his way back to Bulgaria to play for PFC Levski Sofia. Despite his excellent goal record, he played at Levski for just one and a half seasons as he returned to Switzerland with Neuchâtel Xamax in January 1995. The following January, he signed for FC Luzern and he went on to play over fifty league matches for the club before going to FC Aarau for a second spell in 1998. In 2000, he played for FC Basel for a short while before dropping down to the Swiss lower leagues where he continued to play for another two years with Kickers Luzern and Blue Star Zürich.

== International career ==
Aleksandrov was capped 25 times by the Bulgaria national team and was part of the squad that reached the semi-finals of the 1994 World Cup. His international debut came in a 0–0 draw with Scotland on 10 September 1987 and he went on to score five international goals. Aleksandrov came on as a substitute for the last ten minutes in the memorable 2–1 away win over France on 17 November 1993, which secured Bulgaria's qualification for the 1994 World Cup.

=== International goals ===
Scores and results list Bulgaria's goal tally first, score column indicates score after each Aleksandrov goal.

List of international goals scored by Petar Aleksandrov
No.	Date	Venue	Opponent	Score	Result	Competition
1	29 October 1986	Stade Olympique El Menzah, Tunis, Tunisia	Tunisia	1–0	3–3	Friendly match
2	21 January 1988	Sheikh Jassim Bin Hamad (Al-Sadd) Stadium, Doha, Qatar	Qatar	2–?	3–2	Friendly match
3	27 January 1988	Sheikh Maktoum bin Rashid Al Maktoum Stadium, Dubai, United Arab Emirates	United Arab Emirates	3–0	3–1	Friendly match
4	7 August 1988	Laugardalsvöllur, Reykjavík, Iceland	Iceland	3–2	3–2	Friendly match
5	9 April 1991	Odense Stadium, Odense, Denmark	Denmark	1–1	1–1	Friendly match

== Coaching career ==
After his retirement from playing, Aleksandrov stayed in Switzerland and managed the reserve squad of FC Aarau from 2002 until 2004 when he became the assistant manager of Greek side PAOK In 2006, he was appointed as fellow countryman Krasimir Balakov's assistant at FC St. Gallen but he left after a few months to join the coaching staff at Grasshopper Club Zürich. In 2008, Plamen Markov named him as his assistant at the Bulgaria national team.

== Honours ==
Slavia Sofia

- Balkans Cup: 1986, 1988

FC Aarau

- Swiss Nationalliga A: 1992–93

Levski Sofia

- A Group: 1993–94
- Bulgarian Cup: 1993–94

Individual

- Swiss Nationalliga A top scorer: 1994–95 (24 goals), 1995–96 (19 goals)
- Foreigner of the Year in Switzerland: 1994–95
