= 1993 Intertoto Cup =

European association football tournament

In the 1993 Intertoto Cup no knock-out rounds were contested, and therefore no winner was declared.

== Group stage ==
The teams were divided into 8 groups of 5 teams each. Opponents played each other once.

=== Group 1 ===
Pos	Team	Pld	W	D	L	GF	GA	GD	Pts
1	(Austria) Rapid Wien	4	3	1	0	14	4	+10	7
2	(Poland) Zawisza Bydgoszcz	4	1	2	1	8	4	+4	4
3	(Sweden) Halmstads BK	4	2	0	2	3	4	−1	4
4	(Denmark) Brøndby IF	4	2	0	2	11	15	−4	4
5	(Bulgaria) Yantra	4	0	1	3	4	13	−9	1

=== Group 2 ===
Pos	Team	Pld	W	D	L	GF	GA	GD	Pts
1	(Sweden) Trelleborgs FF	4	4	0	0	11	2	+9	8
2	(Germany) Saarbrücken	4	3	0	1	10	5	+5	6
3	(Denmark) Lyngby BK	4	2	0	2	9	10	−1	4
4	(Romania) Rapid București	4	1	0	3	12	11	+1	2
5	(Greece) Korinthos	4	0	0	4	2	16	−14	0

=== Group 3 ===
Pos	Team	Pld	W	D	L	GF	GA	GD	Pts
1	(Sweden) IFK Norrköping	4	3	0	1	11	6	+5	6
2	(Switzerland) Lausanne-Sport	4	3	0	1	11	6	+5	6
3	Austria Wien	4	3	0	1	7	2	+5	6
4	(Poland) Pogoń Szczecin	4	1	0	3	5	11	−6	2
5	(Denmark) Copenhagen	4	0	0	4	2	11	−9	0

=== Group 4 ===
Pos	Team	Pld	W	D	L	GF	GA	GD	Pts
1	(Sweden) Malmö FF	4	2	2	0	5	2	+3	6
2	(Denmark) OB	4	2	0	2	9	7	+2	4
3	(Germany) Bayer Uerdingen	4	2	0	2	6	7	−1	4
4	(Hungary) Videoton	4	1	1	2	9	6	+3	3
5	(Slovakia) Dunajská Streda	4	1	1	2	3	10	−7	3

=== Group 5 ===
Pos	Team	Pld	W	D	L	GF	GA	GD	Pts
1	(Czech Republic) Slavia Prague	4	4	0	0	11	2	+9	8
2	(Germany) Lokomotive Leipzig	4	2	1	1	5	3	+2	5
3	(Denmark) AaB	4	2	0	2	6	7	−1	4
4	(Sweden) Häcken	4	1	0	3	5	8	−3	2
5	(Israel) Maccabi Tel Aviv	4	0	1	3	2	9	−7	1

=== Group 6 ===
Pos	Team	Pld	W	D	L	GF	GA	GD	Pts
1	(Switzerland) Zürich	4	2	1	1	7	5	+2	5
2	(Slovakia) Slovan Bratislava	4	2	1	1	8	8	0	5
3	(Austria) Tirol Innsbruck	4	1	2	1	5	4	+1	4
4	(Germany) VfL Bochum	4	1	2	1	5	5	0	4
5	(Denmark) Silkeborg IF	4	0	2	2	4	7	−3	2

=== Group 7 ===
Pos	Team	Pld	W	D	L	GF	GA	GD	Pts
1	(Switzerland) Young Boys	4	3	1	0	9	5	+4	7
2	(Czech Republic) Sigma Olomouc	4	3	0	1	5	2	+3	6
3	(Denmark) Aarhus	4	2	0	2	12	6	+6	4
4	Austria Salzburg	4	1	0	3	3	10	−7	2
5	(Romania) Oțelul Galați	4	0	1	3	4	10	−6	1

=== Group 8 ===
Pos	Team	Pld	W	D	L	GF	GA	GD	Pts
1	(Germany) Dynamo Dresden	4	2	2	0	4	1	+3	6
2	(Switzerland) Aarau	4	1	3	0	4	3	+1	5
3	(Austria) Wiener SC	4	1	2	1	5	4	+1	4
4	(Greece) Iraklis	4	1	1	2	5	7	−2	3
5	(Israel) Beitar Jerusalem	4	0	2	2	3	6	−3	2

== See also ==
- 1993–94 UEFA Champions League
- 1993–94 European Cup Winners' Cup
- 1993–94 UEFA Cup
