= Michel Zen-Ruffinen =

Swiss football administrator and lawyer

Secretary General of FIFA
- In office 1998–2002
- Preceded by: Sepp Blatter
- Succeeded by: Urs Linsi

Personal details
- Born: 24 April 1959 (age 66) Switzerland

Michel Zen-Ruffinen (born 24 April 1959) is a Swiss football administrator. He served as the Secretary General of FIFA, the international governing body of the sport, from 1998 to 2002.

Zen-Ruffinen is a lawyer specializing in sports law and has been a football referee. His career at FIFA career began in 1986, and he was subsequently appointed head of its legal department by Sepp Blatter, then general secretary of the Association. He was then appointed Blatter's deputy, and became president of FIFA. He has been nominated for the post of general secretary.

On 3 May 2002, at a meeting of the Executive Committee of the Federation, Zen-Ruffinen presented a report which put forward serious accusations against President Blatter. Five of the seven vice-presidents demanded that Blatter resign, but the Committee preferred that he submit a written explanation on all eight charges made against him. Soon, due to significant disagreements with FIFA leadership, Zen-Ruffinen was forced to leave his position.

In 2007, he was appointed head of the Association of Football Agents (AFA).

In 2015, he expressed his intentions to run for the FIFA post of president, but did not run.
