= 1992–93 Nationalliga A =

Swiss football season

Nationalliga A
- Season: 1992–93
- Champions: Aarau
- Relegated: Bulle; St. Gallen; Chiasso
- Top goalscorer: Sonny Anderson, Servette, (20 goals)

Nationalliga B
- Season: 1992–93
- Champions: No team was declared champions
- Promoted: Luzern; Yverdon-Sport; Kriens
- Relegated: Urania Genève Sport; Wettingen; Châtel-Saint-Denis; Brüttisellen; Emmenbrücke; Chur; La Chaux-de-Fonds

Statistics of Swiss National League in the 1992–93 football season, both Nationalliga A and Nationalliga B.

== Overview ==
The 36 teams of the Swiss Football League (Nationalliga) were divided into two tiers. In the top-tier, there were 12 teams that played in the Nationalliga A (NLA). There were 24 teams in the Nationalliga B (NLB), the second tier, these were divided into two groups, a West and an East group. Each team in each group played a double round-robin in the qualification phase. Thereafter the divisions were divided into a Swiss championship group with the top eight teams from the qualification and two promotion/relegation groups (NLA/NLB), both with eight teams. These were the bottom four teams from the NLA qualification and the top six teams from both of the NLB qualification groups. Further, there were two relegation groups (NLB/1. Liga), each group with six teams.

Due to a system change in the Nationalliga, the format of the following NLB season was to reduce the number of teams from 24 to 20. This change would continue over the next few seasons. One season later the teams were to be reduced from 20 to 16. The final aim was to have 12 teams in the top tier and also 12 in the second tier. Therefore, this season there were to be seven relegations from the NLB to next season's 1. Liga (third tier), with only three promotions in the opposite direction.

== Nationalliga A ==
=== Qualification phase ===
The first stage of the NLA began on 18 July 1992 and was completed on 6 December. The top eight teams in the qualification phase would advance to the championship group and the last four teams would play against relegation.

==== Table ====
Pos	Team	Pld	W	D	L	GF	GA	GD	Pts	Qualification
1	Young Boys	22	11	6	5	44	30	+14	28	Advance to championship round halved points (rounded up) as bonus
2	Servette	22	10	7	5	32	18	+14	27	Advance to championship round halved points (rounded up) as bonus
3	Sion	22	8	10	4	28	21	+7	26	Advance to championship round halved points (rounded up) as bonus
4	Lausanne-Sport	22	7	10	5	28	21	+7	24	Advance to championship round halved points (rounded up) as bonus
5	Aarau	22	9	6	7	30	34	−4	24	Advance to championship round halved points (rounded up) as bonus
6	Zürich	22	8	7	7	21	22	−1	23	Advance to championship round halved points (rounded up) as bonus
7	Xamax	22	6	10	6	30	26	+4	22	Advance to championship round halved points (rounded up) as bonus
8	Lugano	22	7	8	7	29	28	+1	22	Advance to championship round halved points (rounded up) as bonus
9	Grasshopper Club	22	5	11	6	27	27	0	21	Continue to promotion/relegation round
10	St. Gallen	22	4	10	8	21	28	−7	18	Continue to promotion/relegation round
11	Chiasso	22	5	6	11	15	26	−11	16	Continue to promotion/relegation round
12	Bulle	22	4	5	13	18	42	−24	13	Continue to promotion/relegation round

Source: rsssf.com
Rules for classification: 1) Points; 2) Goal difference; 3) Goals scored; 4) Head-to-head points; 5) Away goals scored; 6) Draw.

==== Results ====
Home \ Away	AAR	BUL	CHI	GCZ	LS	LUG	NX	SER	SIO	STG	YB	ZÜR
Aarau		3–1	2–1	0–1	1–1	3–1	2–1	2–0	1–1	3–2	1–1	1–1
Bulle	0–1		2–1	0–1	0–0	2–0	2–2	2–1	1–2	0–1	1–4	2–1
Chiasso	1–1	0–0		0–1	1–1	1–0	3–1	1–2	0–0	0–0	0–4	0–1
Grasshopper	2–3	5–0	1–1		1–1	2–2	1–1	0–2	1–1	0–0	1–1	3–1
Lausanne-Sport	3–0	5–1	1–0	1–1		1–1	0–0	2–1	0–2	0–0	0–0	3–2
Lugano	4–1	1–1	0–1	2–1	1–0		2–0	1–1	2–1	2–2	1–1	0–1
Neuchâtel Xamax	5–1	1–0	3–1	3–3	2–0	3–0		0–0	1–1	0–0	1–3	1–1
Servette	3–0	3–0	2–0	3–0	2–1	0–0	1–2		1–1	1–0	4–1	0–1
Sion	0–0	2–0	3–0	2–0	1–1	1–4	3–2	1–1		2–1	3–3	0–0
St. Gallen	1–4	2–2	0–1	1–1	2–3	1–1	1–0	1–1	1–0		2–4	1–1
Young Boys	2–0	4–1	1–0	2–1	1–4	2–3	1–1	1–2	1–0	2–1		4–1
Zürich	2–0	2–0	0–2	0–0	1–0	2–1	0–0	1–1	0–1	0–1	2–1	

Source: rsssf.com
Legend: Blue = home team win; Yellow = draw; Red = away team win.

=== Championship group ===
The first eight teams of the qualification phase competed in the Championship round. The teams took half of the points (rounded up to complete units) gained in the qualification as bonus with them. The championship group began on 28 February 1993 and was completed on 12 June.

==== Table ====
Pos	Team	Pld	W	D	L	GF	GA	GD	BP	Pts	Qualification
1	Aarau	14	9	4	1	21	7	+14	12	34	Swiss champions, qualified for 1993–94 UEFA Champions League preliminary round and entered 1993 Intertoto Cup
2	Young Boys	14	5	4	5	15	15	0	14	28	Qualified for 1993–94 UEFA Cup and entered 1993 Intertoto Cup
3	Servette	14	5	3	6	16	19	−3	14	27	Qualified for 1993–94 UEFA Cup
4	Lugano	14	7	2	5	21	14	+7	11	27	Swiss Cup winners, qualified for 1993–94 UEFA Cup Winners' Cup
5	Zürich	14	5	4	5	13	14	−1	12	26	Entered 1993 Intertoto Cup
6	Sion	14	4	3	7	17	22	−5	13	24	
7	Xamax	14	4	5	5	16	16	0	11	24	
8	Lausanne-Sport	14	3	3	8	11	23	−12	12	21	Entered 1993 Intertoto Cup

Source: rsssf.com
Rules for classification: 1) points; 2) Position in the qualification.

==== Results ====
Home \ Away	AAR	LS	LUG	NX	SER	SIO	YB	ZÜR
Aarau		3–0	1–1	1–0	1–1	2–1	2–0	1–0
Lausanne-Sport	2–1		0–3	1–1	1–3	1–0	0–0	2–0
Lugano	1–2	1–0		1–4	0–1	5–0	2–1	2–0
Neuchâtel Xamax	0–0	2–2	0–0		3–0	1–1	0–1	3–0
Servette	0–2	2–1	1–0	0–1		5–2	0–2	0–2
Sion	0–1	4–0	2–0	3–1	0–0		2–0	1–4
Young Boys	1–4	1–0	2–3	4–0	1–1	2–1		0–0
Zürich	0–0	2–1	0–2	2–0	3–2	0–0	0–0	

Source: rsssf.com
Legend: Blue = home team win; Yellow = draw; Red = away team win.

== Nationalliga B ==
=== Qualification phase ===
The qualification of the NLB began on 28 July 1993 and was completed on 21 November. The top six teams in each group were qualified to play in the two promotion/relegation groups. The bottom six teams in each group then played in the newly drawn groups against relegation.

==== Table group East ====
Pos	Team	Pld	W	D	L	GF	GA	GD	Pts	Qualification
1	FC Luzern	22	13	7	2	41	12	+29	33	Promotion round
2	FC Winterthur	22	13	6	3	46	21	+25	32	Promotion round
3	FC Locarno	22	10	10	2	38	22	+16	30	Promotion round
4	FC Schaffhausen	22	11	7	4	38	23	+15	29	Promotion round
5	FC Wil	22	9	8	5	32	19	+13	26	Promotion round
6	SC Kriens	22	9	7	6	39	26	+13	25	Promotion round
7	FC Baden	22	7	9	6	27	28	−1	23	Relegation round
8	AC Bellinzona	22	3	8	11	28	44	−16	14	Relegation round
9	FC Chur	22	3	8	11	23	44	−21	14	Relegation round
10	FC Wettingen	22	5	3	14	18	39	−21	13	Relegation round
11	FC Emmenbrücke	22	4	5	13	20	42	−22	13	Relegation round
12	FC Brüttisellen	22	5	2	15	23	53	−30	12	Relegation round

Source: rsssf.com
Rules for classification: 1) Points; 2) Goal difference; 3) Goals scored; 4) Head-to-head points; 5) Away goals scored; 6) Draw.

==== Table group West ====
Pos	Team	Pld	W	D	L	GF	GA	GD	Pts	Qualification
1	Yverdon-Sport FC	22	17	3	2	60	24	+36	37	Promotion round
2	FC Basel	22	16	4	2	54	10	+44	36	Promotion round
3	Etoile Carouge FC	22	14	0	8	48	32	+16	28	Promotion round
4	CS Chênois	22	12	2	8	37	39	−2	26	Promotion round
5	FC Grenchen	22	11	3	8	40	25	+15	25	Promotion round
6	SR Delémont	22	8	5	9	31	33	−2	21	Promotion round
7	Urania Genève Sport	22	7	4	11	33	43	−10	18	Relegation round
8	BSC Old Boys	22	5	7	10	27	39	−12	17	Relegation round
9	FC Fribourg	22	7	3	12	29	42	−13	17	Relegation round
10	SC Bümpliz 78	22	5	5	12	26	52	−26	15	Relegation round
11	FC Châtel-St-Denis	22	2	8	12	25	47	−22	12	Relegation round
12	FC La Chaux-de-Fonds	22	4	4	14	25	49	−24	12	Relegation round

Source: rsssf.com
Rules for classification: 1) Points; 2) Goal difference; 3) Goals scored; 4) Head-to-head points; 5) Away goals scored; 6) Draw.

=== Promotion/relegation groups NLA/NLB ===
The teams in the ninth to twelfth positions in Nationalliga A competed with the top six teams from each of the two Nationalliga B groups in a NLA/NLB promotion/relegation round. The teams were divided into two groups, each with eight teams, two from the NLA and six from the NLB. The stage began on 7 March 1993 and was completed on 12 June.

==== Group A ====
===== Table =====
Pos	Team	Pld	W	D	L	GF	GA	GD	Pts	Qualification
1	Grasshopper Club Zürich	14	10	2	2	42	8	+34	22	Remain in NLA 1993–94
2	FC Luzern	14	10	2	2	30	6	+24	22	Promoted to NLA 1993–94
3	FC Bulle	14	8	3	3	28	20	+8	19	Relegation to NLB 1993–94
4	FC Basel	14	7	4	3	25	17	+8	18	Remain in NLB 1993–94
5	SR Delémont	14	4	2	8	14	28	−14	10	Remain in NLB 1993–94
6	CS Chênois	14	4	1	9	9	29	−20	9	Remain in NLB 1993–94
7	FC Locarno	14	3	1	10	16	31	−15	7	Remain in NLB 1993–94
8	FC Wil	14	1	3	10	7	32	−25	5	Remain in NLB 1993–94

Source: rsssf.com
Rules for classification: 1) Points; 2) Goal difference; 3) Goals scored; 4) Head-to-head points; 5) Away goals scored; 6) Draw.

===== Results =====
Home \ Away	BAS	BUL	CHÊ	DEL	GCZ	LOC	LUZ	WIL
Basel		1–2	4–1	3–2	0–2	2–0	1–1	1–1
Bulle	1–3		6–0	2–0	2–4	3–1	0–0	1–1
Chênois	0–1	4–0		2–0	0–1	2–1	0–2	1–2
Delémont	0–2	1–2	1–1		1–0	3–2	0–3	2–1
Grasshopper	1–1	8–0	5–0	1–1		9–0	3–0	2–0
Locarno	1–4	1–1	0–1	3–0	1–2		0–1	2–0
Luzern	4–1	0–1	2–0	5–0	2–0	3–0		4–0
Wil	1–1	0–3	0–1	1–3	0–4	0–4	0–3	

Source: rsssf.com
Legend: Blue = home team win; Yellow = draw; Red = away team win.

==== Group B ====
===== Table =====
Pos	Team	Pld	W	D	L	GF	GA	GD	Pts	Qualification
1	Yverdon-Sport FC	14	9	3	2	32	21	+11	21	Promoted to NLA 1993–94
2	SC Kriens	14	9	3	2	22	15	+7	21	Promoted to NLA 1993–94
3	FC St. Gallen	14	10	0	4	34	12	+22	20	Relegation to NLB 1993–94
4	FC Schaffhausen	14	8	1	5	22	16	+6	17	Remain in NLB 1993–94
5	FC Chiasso	14	7	2	5	22	15	+7	16	Relegation to NLB 1993–94
6	FC Winterthur	14	2	3	9	12	28	−16	7	Remain in NLB 1993–94
7	Étoile Carouge FC	14	3	0	11	14	33	−19	6	Remain in NLB 1993–94
8	FC Grenchen	14	1	2	11	8	26	−18	4	Remain in NLB 1993–94

Source: rsssf.com
Rules for classification: 1) Points; 2) Goal difference; 3) Goals scored; 4) Head-to-head points; 5) Away goals scored; 6) Draw.

===== Results =====
Home \ Away	CHI	ÉTO	GRE	KRI	SHA	STG	WIN	YS
Chiasso		0–1	1–0	1–2	2–0	0–2	1–0	6–2
Étoile Carouge	0–3		2–0	1–2	1–3	0–1	1–4	2–3
Grenchen	1–1	0–1		1–2	0–2	0–2	3–0	0–2
Kriens	0–0	4–2	2–0		0–2	2–0	2–0	1–7
Schaffhausen	1–2	3–0	1–0	0–0		1–3	2–0	1–3
St. Gallen	3–1	4–1	5–0	0–1	2–3		1–0	7–1
Winterthur	1–3	2–1	3–3	0–3	0–3	1–4		0–0
Yverdon-Sport	2–1	4–1	2–0	1–1	2–0	1–0	1–1	

Source: rsssf.com
Legend: Blue = home team win; Yellow = draw; Red = away team win.

=== Relegation groups NLB/1. Liga ===
The last six teams in each of the two qualification phase groups competed in two relegation groups against relegation to the 1. Liga 1993–94. The teams were drawn into these two groups and received ranking bonus points from their qualifying groups (7th place 6 pts; 8th place 5 pts; 9th place 4 pts; etc). There were three direct relegations and a relegation play-out between the two fifth placed teams. This stage began on 28 February 1993 and was completed on 25 May.

==== Table group A ====
Pos	Team	Pld	W	D	L	GF	GA	GD	BP	Pts	Qualification
1	AC Bellinzona	10	6	3	1	20	9	+11	5	20	Remain in NLB 1993–94
2	FC Fribourg	10	5	3	2	16	13	+3	4	17	Remain in NLB 1993–94
3	Urania Genève Sport	10	4	3	3	15	17	−2	6	17	Play-out against relegation
4	FC Wettingen	10	6	0	4	20	13	+7	3	15	Relegation to 1. Liga 1993–94
5	FC Châtel-Saint-Denis	10	2	1	7	14	24	−10	2	7	Relegation to 1. Liga 1993–94
6	FC Brüttisellen	10	0	4	6	8	17	−9	1	5	Relegation to 1. Liga 1993–94

Source: rsssf.com
Rules for classification: 1) Points; 2) Goal difference; 3) Goals scored; 4) Head-to-head points; 5) Away goals scored; 6) Draw.

==== Table group B ====
Pos	Team	Pld	W	D	L	GF	GA	GD	BP	Pts	Qualification
1	BSC Old Boys	10	8	0	2	32	15	+17	5	21	Remain in NLB 1993–94
2	FC Baden	10	4	3	3	23	26	−3	6	17	Remain in NLB 1993–94
3	SC Bümpliz 78	10	4	2	4	14	14	0	3	13	Play-out against relegation
4	FC Emmenbrücke	10	4	1	5	17	18	−1	2	11	Relegation to 1. Liga 1993–94
5	FC Chur	10	2	2	6	14	21	−7	4	10	Relegation to 1. Liga 1993–94
6	FC La Chaux-de-Fonds	10	2	4	4	7	13	−6	1	9	Relegation to 1. Liga 1993–94

Source: rsssf.com
Rules for classification: 1) Points; 2) Goal difference; 3) Goals scored; 4) Head-to-head points; 5) Away goals scored; 6) Draw.

==== Relegation play-out ====
Team 1	Score	Team 2
Urania Genève Sport	2–0	SC Bümpliz 78
SC Bümpliz 78	1–4	Urania Genève Sport

Urania Genève Sport win 6–1 on aggregate. SC Bümpliz 78 are relegated to 1. Liga 1993–94.

== Attendances ==
#	Club	Average
1	Xamax	8,506
2	Sion	7,483
3	Young Boys	6,872
4	Lausanne	6,236
5	Servette	6,128
6	Aarau	5,183
7	GCZ	4,850
8	St. Gallen	4,811
9	Zürich	4,456
10	Lugano	3,989
11	Bulle	2,306
12	Chiasso	1,844

== Further in Swiss football ==
- 1992–93 Swiss Cup
- 1992–93 Swiss 1. Liga

== Sources ==
- Switzerland 1992–93 at RSSSF
