= 1968 in association football =

The following are the association football (soccer) events of the year 1968 throughout the world.

== Events ==
- Copa Libertadores 1968: Won by Estudiantes de La Plata after defeating Palmeiras on an aggregate score of 2–0.
- 29 May – European Cup won by Manchester United after defeating Benfica 4–1 in extra time at Wembley Stadium, London.
- 30 May – The Dutch national team plays its 300th official match in history, drawing 0–0 in a friendly against Scotland.
- 5 June – Alan Mullery becomes the first England player to be sent off in an international match during a 0–1 defeat to Yugoslavia in the European Nations' Cup semi-finals in Florence, Italy.
- 19 September – Dutch club ADO makes its European debut by defeating Grazer AK (4–1) in the first round of the Cup Winners Cup, with four goals from Piet Giesen.

== Winners club national championship ==
=== Asia ===
- Qatar: Al-Oruba

=== Europe ===
- England: Manchester City
- France: AS Saint-Étienne
- Iceland: KR
- Italy: A.C. Milan
- Netherlands: Ajax Amsterdam
- Poland: Ruch Chorzów
- Scotland: Celtic
- Spain: Real Madrid
- Turkey: Fenerbahçe
- West Germany: 1. FC Nürnberg

=== North America ===
- Mexico: Toluca
- United States / Canada
  - Atlanta Chiefs (NASL)

=== South America ===
- Argentina
  - San Lorenzo - Metropolitano
  - Vélez Sársfield - Nacional
- Brazil
  - Botafogo - Taça Brasil
  - Santos - Torneio Roberto Gomes Pedrosa
- Paraguay: Olimpia Asunción

== International tournaments ==
- African Cup of Nations in Ethiopia (12–21 January 1968)
  1. Congo-Kinshasa
  2. Ghana
  3. Ivory Coast
- 1968 British Home Championship (21 October 1967 – 28 February 1968)

England

- UEFA European Football Championship in Italy (5–10 June 1968)
  1. Italy
  2. Yugoslavia
  3. England
- Olympic Games in Mexico City, Mexico (13–26 October 1968)
  1. Hungary
  2. Bulgaria
  3. Japan

== Births ==
- 1 January – Davor Šuker, Croatian international footballer
- 5 January – Gennaro Monaco, Italian former player, former manager
- 27 January – Gidix Nasa, Papua New Guinean former footballer
- 31 January – Dragan Reljić, Croatian former professional footballer
- 27 March – René Fluri, retired Swiss footballer
- 31 March – Francesco Moriero, Italian international footballer and manager
- 1 April – Bulat Esmagambetov, Kazakhstani footballer
- 16 April – Martin Dahlin, Swedish international footballer
- 18 April – Adelio Salinas, former Paraguayan footballer
- 1 May – Oliver Bierhoff, German international footballer
- 2 May – Pedro Ramos, Ecuadorian football referee
- 22 May – Gabriel Mendoza, Chilean international footballer
- 5 June – Percy Olivares, Peruvian footballer
- 6 June – Edwin Vurens, Dutch footballer
- 22 June – Fabián Guevara, Chilean footballer
- 25 June – Dorinel Munteanu, Romanian international footballer
- 16 July – Jorge Sosa (Jorge Adrián Sosa Reyna), Mexican football manager and former player
- 25 June – Martin Filson, English former professional footballer
- 26 June – Paolo Maldini, Italian international footballer
- 6 August – Fulvio Cimino, retired Swiss footballer
- 14 August
  - Darren Newman, English former professional footballer
  - Onésimo Sánchez, Spanish football player and manager
- 15 August – Ulugbek Ruzimov, Uzbekistani footballer
- 20 August – Klas Ingesson, Swedish international footballer and manager (died 2014)
- 22 August – Alejandro Grandi, Uruguayan retired footballer
- 11 September – Slaven Bilić, Croatian international football player and manager
- 14 September – Jorge Gómez, Chilean footballer
- 15 September – Juan Carlos Garay, Ecuadorian footballer
- 17 September – Francesc Vilanova, Spanish footballer and manager (died 2014)
- 18 September – Carlos Guirland, Paraguayan footballer
- 23 September – Franco Massimo, English former professional footballer
- 25 September – Gary Blackford, English former professional footballer
- 27 September – Robert Alleyne, English former professional footballer
- 8 October – Zvonimir Boban, Croatian international footballer
- 17 October – Héctor Ferri, Ecuadorian footballer
- 20 October – Jonathan Akpoborie, Nigerian international footballer
- 24 October – Osmar Donizete Cândido, Brazilian international footballer
- 27 October – Jamie Slater, Welsh former professional footballer
- 30 October – Chris Grocock, English lawyer and former professional footballer
- 18 November – Barry Hunter, Northern Irish international and scout
- 4 December – Gilles Petrucci, retired French footballer
- 8 December – Igor Luzyakin, Russian professional football coach and former player
- 13 December – Carlos Hasselbaink, Dutch footballer
- 26 December – Thijs Waterink, Dutch footballer
- 27 December – Steve Guillod, retired Swiss footballer

== Deaths ==
=== January ===
- 4 January – Armando Castellazzi, Italian midfielder, winner of the 1934 FIFA World Cup and first man to win the Serie A both as player and as manager. (63)

=== June ===
- 17 June – José Nasazzi, Uruguayan defender, winner of the 1930 FIFA World Cup and by many regarded as Uruguay's greatest ever player. (67)

=== August ===
- 30 August - Luitpold Popp, German international footballer (born 1893)

=== November ===
- 10 November – Santos Iriarte, Uruguayan forward, winner of the 1930 FIFA World Cup. (66)

=== December ===
- 21 December – Vittorio Pozzo, Italian manager, winner of the 1934 FIFA World Cup and 1938 FIFA World Cup and the only manager that won the FIFA World Cup twice. (82)
- 28 December – Fernando Giudicelli, Brazilian midfielder, Brazilian squad member the 1930 FIFA World Cup. (62)
