= 1991–92 FC Basel season =

FC Basel
1991–92 season
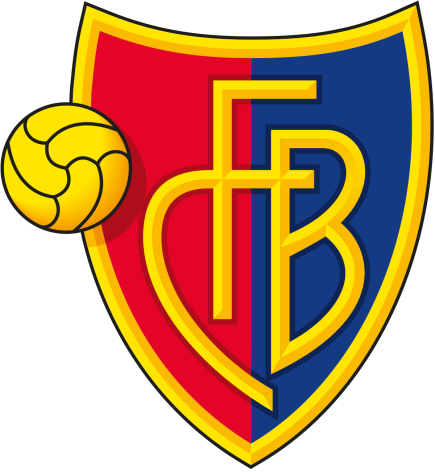
- Club president: Charles Röthlisberger
- Head coach: Ernst August Künnecke (until March 1992) co-coaches (from April); Karl Odermatt and Bruno Rahmen
- Ground: St. Jakob Stadium, Basel
- Nationalliga B: Qualifying 1st of 12
- Promotion/relegation round: 4th of 8
- Swiss Cup: Quarterfinal
- Top goalscorer: League: André Sitek (20); All: André Sitek (20)
- Highest home attendance: 8,300 on 25 April 1992 vs Locarno
- Lowest home attendance: 1,010 on 9 May 1992 vs Bellinzona
- Average home league attendance: 3,756

The Fussball Club Basel 1893 1991–92 season was their 98th season since the club's foundation. Charles Röthlisberger was the club's chairman for the fourth consecutive year. FC Basel played their home games in the St. Jakob Stadium. Following their relegation in the 1987–88 season this was their fourth season in the second-tier of Swiss football.

== Overview ==
=== Pre-season ===
Ernst August Künnecke was first-team coach for the second consecutive season. After missing promotion in the previous season, the club's repeated priority aim was to return to the top flight of Swiss football. There were a number of changes in the squad. Erni Maissen retired from his professional playing career. Between the years 1975 to 1982, 1983 to 1987 and again from 1989 to 1991 Maissen played a total of 551 games for Basel scoring a total of 222 goals. 338 of these games were in the domestic league, Nationalliga A or Nationalliga B, 33 in the Swiss Cup, 15 in the Swiss League Cup, 20 in the European competitions (European Cup, UEFA cup, Cup of the Alps) and 145 were friendly games. He scored 116 goal in the domestic league, 23 in the cup competitions, four in the European competitions and the other 79 were scored during the test games. Enrique Mata also retired from his professional playing career and moved on to FC Laufen. Mata had played six seasons with the club and during this time he had played a total of 173 games for Basel scoring a total of 30 goals. 104 of these games were in the Nationalliga A, 14 in the Swiss Cup and 55 were friendly games. He scored 18 goals in the domestic league, five in the cup and the other seven were scored during the test games.

Further players who left the club were Sascha Reich and Patrick Rahmen who both transferred to Young Boys. Brian Bertelsen left the club as well and transferred to St. Gallen, Germano Fanciulli moved on to play for Grenchen and Roman Hangarter returned to FC Brüttisellen. The contracts with Roman Künzli and Patrick Liniger were not prolonged. In the other direction Patrick's brother Micha Rahmen joined from Grasshopper Club, Robert Kok transferred in from Zürich and André Sitek joined from Baden. A number of youngsters joined from their local clubs, Olivier Bauer and Christian Marcolli joined from FC Aesch, Walter Bernhard joined from SV Muttenz, Adrian Jenzer joined from Rapid Ostermundigen, Mourad Bounoua came from French club Mulhouse, Thomas Schweizer from German club SC Freiburg and Gilbert Epars came from Servette. There were also a number of youngsters who were brought up internally.

=== Domestic league ===
The 24 teams in the Nationalliga B were divided into two groups, a South/East and a West group. They would first play a qualification round. In the second stage the tops six teams of each group and the last four team of the Nationalliga A would play a promotion/relegation round, also divided into two groups. The top two teams in each of these groups would play in the top flight the next season. Basel were assigned to the West group. Also in this group were local rivals Old Boys. In the two local duals, Basel lost the away game against the Old Boys, 0–4, and could only manage a goalless draw against them in their home stadium. For Basel the season ran well, despite three defeats in the first six games, including this nasty defeat against the Old Boys, Basel had a good run staying unbeaten for the next 15 rounds, winning 11 of these matches. Basel then ended the Qualifying Phase in top position in the league table. In the 22 matches Basel totaled 31 points with 13 victories, five draws and four defeats. The team scored 42 goals and conceded 30.

Basel qualified for the promotion stage and were assigned to group A. Also assigned to this group from the Nationalliga B were Yverdon-Sports, Baden, Locarno, ES Malley and AC Bellinzona and fighting against relegation from the Nationalliga A were Lugano and Aarau. However, the promotion-relegation phase started badly; Basel could only draw four games and lost two from the first six games. Trainer Ernst August Künnecke was released from his position. The two former players Karl Odermatt and Bruno Rahmen took over as coaches ad interim until the end of the season. The results there after were better, but the gap to the leading teams could not be closed. The team ended their 14 matches in this stage with just four victories, six draws, suffering four defeats with 14 points in a very disappointing fourth position in the league table, scoring 20, conceding 22 goals. Therefore, they missed their aim of promotion once again.

=== Swiss Cup ===
In the second round of the Swiss Cup Basel were drawn away from home against lower-tier FC Einsiedeln and in the round of 64 away against lower-tier FC Willisau. Both games were won easily (6–2 and 2–0). In the round of 32 Basel were drawn at home against second-tier Bulle and the game ended with a 1–1 draw after extra time. Basel secured the victory in the penalty shoot-out. In the next round they were drawn at home against FC Bern (5–1 victory). But in the quarterfinals Basel were drawn at home against Lugano. Because this match ended in a 2–3 defeat they were eliminated. Lugano continued and later reached the final, but in the final they were beaten 3–1, after extra time, by cup-winners Luzern.

== Players ==
Note: Flags indicate national team as defined under FIFA eligibility rules; some limited exceptions apply. Players may hold more than one non-FIFA nationality.

No.	Pos.	Nation	Player
—	GK	SUI	Roger Glanzmann
—	GK	SUI	Thomas Grüter
—	DF	SUI	Olivier Bauer (from FC Aesch)
—	DF	SUI	Reto Baumgartner
—	DF	SUI	Walter Bernhard (from SV Muttenz)
—	DF	SUI	Massimo Ceccaroni
—	DF	YUG	Miodrag Đurđević
—	DF	SUI	Thomas Karrer
—	DF	SUI	Micha Rahmen (from Grasshopper Club)
—	DF	SUI	Martin Thalmann
—	MF	FRA	Mourad Bounoua (from Mulhouse)
—	MF	SUI	Gilbert Epars (from Servette)
—	MF	ITA	Vittorio Gottardi

No.	Pos.	Nation	Player
—	MF	GER	Maximilian Heidenreich
—	MF	SUI	Martin Jeitziner (from Xamax)
—	MF	SUI	Adrian Jenzer (from Rapid Ostermundigen)
—	MF	ITA	Boris Mancastroppa
—	MF	SUI	Andreas Steiner
—	MF	GER	Manfred Wagner
—	FW	NED	Robert Kok (from Zürich)
—	MF	SUI	Christian Marcolli (from FC Aesch)
—	MF	GER	Thomas Schweizer (from SC Freiburg)
—	FW	NED	André Sitek (from Baden)
—	FW	GER	Frank Wittmann
—	FW	SUI	Ruedi Zbinden
—		SUI	Rocco Verrelli (from youth team)
—		SUI	Mathias Walther (from youth team)

Players who left the squad

Note: Flags indicate national team as defined under FIFA eligibility rules; some limited exceptions apply. Players may hold more than one non-FIFA nationality.

No.	Pos.	Nation	Player
—	GK	SUI	Roman Künzli (to FC Laufen)
—	DF	SUI	Patrick Liniger
—	DF	SUI	Sascha Reich (to Young Boys)
—	MF	DEN	Brian Bertelsen (to St. Gallen)

No.	Pos.	Nation	Player
—	MF	ESP	Enrique Mata (to FC Laufen)
—	FW	ITA	Germano Fanciulli (to Grenchen)
—	FW	SUI	Roman Hangarter (to FC Brüttisellen)
—	FW	SUI	Erni Maissen (retired)
—	FW	SUI	Patrick Rahmen (to Young Boys)

== Results ==
Legend

Win Draw Loss Postponed

=== Friendly matches ===
==== Pre-season ====
29 June 1991 Pre-season	FC Zeiningen (Switzerland)	2–15	(Switzerland) Basel	Unter Reben, Zeiningen, Switzerland
17:50	Rossi 38' (1:4); Kägi 74' (2:10)	FCB summary	3' (0:1) Sitek; 9' (0:2) Zbinden; 12' (0:3) Sitek; 22' (0:4) Jenzer; 49' (1:5) Brack; 57' (1:6) Brack; 58' (1:7) Baumgartner; 63' (1:8) Marcolli; 67' (1:9) Baumgartner; 68' (1:10) Baumgartner; 75' (2:11) Zapata; 81' (2:12) Brack; 83' (2:13) Baumgartner; 86' (2:14) Schweizer; 88' (2:15) M. Rahmen	Attendance: 300; Referee: (Switzerland) Rolf Blattmann (Zeiningen) (Switzerland) Bänziger from 46'

6 July 1991 Pre-season	FC Klengen (Germany)	0–6	(Switzerland) Basel	Klengen (Brigachtal), Germany
		FCB summary	10' (0:1) Jeitziner; 21' (0:2) Marcolli; 44' (0:3) Baumgartner; 69' (0:4) Jenzer; 73' (0:5) Schweizer; 74' (0:6) Jenzer

9 July 1991 Pre-season	FC Neustadt (Germany)	1–9	(Switzerland) Basel	Saig bei Lenzkirch, Germany
	Andres 76' (1:8)	FCB summary	6' (0:1) Gottardi; 21' (0:2) Jeitziner; 27' (0:3) Marcolli; 34' (0:4) Marcolli; 39' (0:5) M. Rahmen; 44' (0:6) Mancastroppa; 58' (0:7) Bernhard; 66' (0:8) M. Rahmen; 85' (1:9) Jeitziner

11 July 1991 Exhibition game	Basel (Switzerland)	1–1 (4–5 p)	(Switzerland) Zürich	Moos, Balsthal, Switzerland
19:30	Gottardi (yellow card) 35'; M. Rahmen 63' (1:0)	FCB summary FCZ summary	86' (1:1) Kok	Attendance: 300 (700); Referee: (Switzerland) Dieter Schoch (Attiswil)
	Penalties
	Ceccaroni (penalty scored); Heidenreich (penalty scored); M. Rahmen (penalty scored); Bernhard (penalty missed); Schweizer (penalty scored)		(penalty scored) Tréllez; (penalty scored) Milton; (penalty scored) Mazenauer; (penalty scored) Di Matteo; (penalty scored) Kok
Note: Sempione-Cup, semi-final

13 July 1991 Exhibition game	Basel (Switzerland)	1–5	(Switzerland) Grenchen	Moos, Balsthal, Switzerland
17:00	Mancastroppa 71' (1:4); Jeitziner (penalty missed) 88′	FCB summary	12' (0:1) Vellila; 17' (0:2) Gunia; 42' (0:3) Chételat; 58' (0:4) Kozik; 90+1' (1:5) Przybylo	Attendance: 600; Referee: (Switzerland) Rieder
Note: Sempione-Cup, match for third place

17 July 1991 Exhibition game	Basel (Switzerland)	2–3	(Germany) 1. FC Köln	St. Jakob Stadium, Basel
20:00	Jenzer 62' (1:2); Marcolli 85' (2:3)	FCB summary	44' (0:1) Ordenewitz; 61' (pen. 0:2) Banach; 72' (1:3) Banach	Attendance: 4,000; Referee: (Switzerland) Walter Rudin (Birsfelden)

20 July 1991 Pre-season; Exhibition game	Basel (Switzerland)	1–0	(Switzerland) Chiasso	St. Jakob Stadium, Basel
17:30	Baumgartner 31' (1:0)	FCB summary	(yellow card) 62' Gatti	Attendance: 400; Referee: (Switzerland) Rieder

==== Winter break ====
20 January 1992 Winter break Exhibition game	TAS Casablanca (Morocco)	3–1	(Switzerland) Basel	Casablanca, Morocco
	15' (1:1); 29' (2:1); Walther (o.g. 3:1)	FCB summary	9' (0:1) Sitek
Note: Match as part of the training camp in Morocco

23 January 1992 Winter break	RAJA Casablanca (Morocco)	3–1	(Switzerland) Basel	Casablanca, Morocco
	16' (1:0); 42' (2:1); 61' (3:1)	FCB summary	32' (1:1) Sitek
Note: Match as part of the training camp in Morocco

1 February 1992 Winter break Exhibition game	SC Freiburg (Germany)	2–0	(Switzerland) Basel	Möslestadion, Freiburg, Germany
	Schulz 13' (1:0); Grgic 88' (2:0)	FCB summary		Attendance: 100; Referee: (Germany) Willmann

15 February 1992 Winter break Exhibition game	SC Freiburg (Germany)	1–1	(Switzerland) Basel	Erlenmatten stadium, Bad Krozingen, Germany
	Spies 26' (1:0)	FCB summary	60' (1:1) Sitek	Attendance: 600; Referee: (Germany) Norbert Stocker

18 February 1992 Winter break	Xamax (Switzerland)	2–3	(Switzerland) Basel	Stade Municipal, Payerne
20:00	Bonvin 46' (1:2); Moruzzi 90' (2:3)	FCB summary	10' (0:1) Sitek; 25' (0:2) Schweizer; 64' (1:3) Sitek	Referee: (Switzerland) Kurt Röthlisberger (Suhr, Aargau)

20 February 1992 Winter break Exhibition game	FC Riehen (Switzerland)	1–2	(Switzerland) Basel	Grendelmatte, Riehen
19:00	Heuting 11' (1:0)	FCB summary	23' (1:1) Kok; 87' (1:2) Walther	Attendance: 200; Referee: (Switzerland) Mauro Visentin

23 February 1992 Winter break	Basel (Switzerland)	3–4	(Switzerland) Luzern	St. Jakob Stadium, Basel
14:30	Marcolli 4' (1:0); Marcolli 16' (2:0); Wagner 29' (3:0)	FCB summary	43' (3:1) Wolf; 48' (3:2) Arts; 54' (3:3) Nadig; 64' (3:4) Moser	Attendance: 1,100; Referee: (Switzerland) Walter Rudin (Birsfelden)

=== Nationalliga B ===
The qualification of the NLB began on 24 July 1991 and was completed on 1 December. The top six teams in each group were qualified to play in the two promotion/relegation groups. The bottom six teams in each group then played in the newly drawn groups against relegation.

==== Qualifying Phase West ====
24 July 1991 Round 1	Basel	1–1	Yverdon-Sports	St. Jakob Stadium, Basel
20:00	Schweizer 46' (1:0); Jeitziner (yellow card) 56'	FCB summary	(yellow card) 11' Léger; (yellow card) 25' Castro; 66' (1:1) Dajka; (yellow card) 88' Wicht	Attendance: 2,900; Referee: (Switzerland) Claude Detruche, (Thônex)
Note: Debut for FCB players Thomas Schweizer and Adrian Jenzer

27 July 1991 Round 2	Bulle	1–2	Basel	Stade de Bouleyres, Bulle
20:00	Albertoni (yellow card) 57'; Raboud 81' (1:2)	FCB summary	31' (0:1) Heidenreich; 44' (0:2) Mancastroppa; (yellow card) 70' Gottardi	Attendance: 1,000; Referee: (Switzerland) Erwin Fölmli

3 August 1991 Round 3	Basel	0–2	La Chaux-de-Fonds	St. Jakob Stadium, Basel
17:30	Mancastroppa (yellow card) 62'	FCB summary	33' (0:1) Urosevic; (yellow card) 40' Laydu; (yellow card) 63' Maillard; 68' (0:2) Matthey	Attendance: 3,100; Referee: (Switzerland) Willy Hänni, (Cugy)

6 August 1991 Round 4	Urania Genève Sport	4–1	Basel	Stade de Frontenex, Geneva
20:00	Dominé (yellow card) 30'; Oranci (yellow card) 46'; Mourelle 51' (1:1); Kressibucher 69' (2:1); Oranci 84' (3:1); Navarro 90+3' (4:1)	FCB summary	(yellow card) 21' Zbinden; 49' (0:1) Schweizer; (yellow card) 62' Baumgartner	Attendance: 650; Referee: (Switzerland) Francis Fischer (Arch)
Note: Debut for FCB player Walter Bernhard

10 August 1991 Round 5	Basel	2–1	Etoile Carouge	St. Jakob Stadium, Basel
17:30	Rahmen 1' (1:0); Schweizer 24' (2:1)	FCB summary	(yellow card) 10' Opoku N'Ti; 15' (1:1) Rohr; (yellow card) 33' da Silva; (yellow card) 43' Thomé; (red card) 90+2' Batardon	Attendance: 2,100; Referee: (Switzerland) Manfred Schlup, (Grenchen)

17 August 1991 Round 6	Old Boys	4–0	Basel	Stadion Schützenmatte, Basel
17:30	Du Buisson 21' (1:0); Du Buisson 34' (2:0); Steingruber (yellow card) 37'; Lanz (yellow card) 45+2'; Messerli 53' (3:0); Du Buisson (yellow card) 60'; Lüthi (yellow card) 70'; Lanz 87' (4:0)	FCB summary	(yellow card) 48' Bernhard; (yellow card) 63' Schweizer; (yellow card) 68' Gottardi	Attendance: 5,400; Referee: (Switzerland) Fabrice Kaltenrieder

4 August 1991 Round 7	FC Châtel-Saint-Denis	0–4	Basel	Stade du Lussy, Châtel-Saint-Denis
20:00	Fallert (yellow card) 45'; Martin (yellow card) 60'	FCB summary	(yellow card) 42' Sitek; 48' (0:1) Sitek; 57' (0:2) Sitek; 70' (0:3) Jeitziner; 73' (0:4) Schweizer	Attendance: 600; Referee: (Switzerland) Roman Ullmann

28 August 1991 Round 8	Basel	3–0	Fribourg	St. Jakob Stadium, Basel
20:00	Gottardi (yellow card) 18' (yellow-red card) 40'; Rahmen 23' (1:0); Zbinden (yellow card) 67'; Sitek 74' (2:0); Sitek 80' (3:0)	FCB summary	(red card) 55' Bourquenod; (yellow card) 61' Brülhart; (yellow card) 67' Rojevic	Attendance: 2,900; Referee: (Switzerland) Pierre-Alain Vuillemin (Geneva)

4 September 1991 Round 9	Grenchen	2–4	Basel	Stadion Brühl, Grenchen
20:00	Wenger 5' (1:0); Beckenbauer 34' (2:1); Kozik (yellow card) 72'	FCB summary	19' (1:1) Zbinden; 52' (2:2) Baumgartner; 60' (2:3) Sitek; (yellow card) 61' Schweizer; 77' (2:4) Zbinden	Attendance: 2,200; Referee: (Switzerland) Marcel Vollenweider (Rüti, Zürich)
Note: Around 1,000 spectators from the Basel region.

7 September 1991 Round 10	Basel	3–2	SR Delémont	St. Jakob Stadium, Basel
17:30	Zbinden (penalty missed) 7′ Wagner 7' (1:1); Rahmen 34' (2:2); Baumgartner 66' (3:2); Rahmen (yellow card) 69'	FCB summary	3' (0:1) Rimann; 21' (1:2) Renzi; (penalty missed) 30′ Varga; (yellow card) 37' Stadelmann; (yellow card) 79' Léchenne	Attendance: 4,800; Referee: (Switzerland) Manfred Schlup (Grenchen)
Note: 7th minute, Delémont goalkeeper Fabrice Borer saved Ruedi Zbinden's penalty, but Manfred Wagner scored on the rebound to make it 1-1. 30th minute, FCB goalkeeper Thomas Grüter held István Varga's penalty.

14 September 1991 Round 11	Basel	2–2	ES Malley	St. Jakob Stadium, Basel
17:30	Sitek 5' (1:1); Baumgartner (yellow card) 27'; Zbinden 68' (pen. 2:2)	FCB summary	3' (0:1) Cremieux; (yellow card) 18' Gendron; 63' (1:2) Ducret	Attendance: 4,000; Referee: (Switzerland) Kurt Röthlisberger (Suhr, Aargau)

21 September 1991 Round 12	Yverdon-Sports	0–1	Basel	Stade Municipal, Yverdon-les-Bains
17:30	Vialatte (yellow card) 54'; Kekesi (yellow card) 70'	FCB summary	44' (0:1) Zbinden; (yellow card) 60' Schweizer; (yellow card) 63' Bernhard; (yellow card) 67' Zbinden	Attendance: 1,350; Referee: (Switzerland) Erwin Schuler

5 October 1991 Round 13	Basel	1–0	Bulle	St. Jakob Stadium, Basel
17:30	Rumo 17' (o.g. 1:0); Sitek (yellow card) 74'; Bauer (yellow card) 86'	FCB summary	(yellow card) 46' Lopez; (red card) 62' Lopez; (yellow card) 79' Rumo	Attendance: 4,300; Referee: (Switzerland) Rossi (Ascona)

12 October 1991 Round 14	La Chaux-de-Fonds	3–3	Basel	Stade Charrière, La Chaux-de-Fonds
17:30	Kincses 28' (1:0); Urosevic (yellow card) 38'; Zaugg 66' (2:3); Matthey 82' (3:3)	FCB summary	(yellow card) 19' Heidenreich; (yellow card) 38' Schweizer; 42' (1:1) Heidenreich; 48' (1:2) Heidenreich; 62' (1:3) Heidenreich; (yellow card) 78' Zbinden	Attendance: 1,000; Referee: (Switzerland) Freddy Philippoz (Sion)

15 October 1991 Round 15	Basel	3–1	Urania Genève Sport	St. Jakob Stadium, Basel
20:00	Sitek 63' (1:0); Gottardi (yellow card) 67'; Zbinden 80' (2:0); Jenzer 89' (3:1)	FCB summary	(yellow card) 31' Kressibucher; (yellow card) 39' Besnard; (yellow card) 70' Detraz; (yellow card) 75' Beti; 64' (2:1) Détraz	Attendance: 3,200; Referee: (Switzerland) Pierre-Alain Eschmann (Moutier)

19 October 1991 Round 16	Etoile Carouge	0–0	Basel	Stade de la Fontenette, Carouge
17:30	Thomé (yellow card) 1'	FCB summary	(yellow card) 66' Jenzer	Attendance: 350; Referee: (Switzerland) Ruppen

26 October 1991 Round 17	Basel	0–0	Old Boys	St. Jakob Stadium, Basel
17:30	Gottardi (yellow card) 58'	FCB summary	(yellow card) 61' Lüthi	Attendance: 6,600; Referee: (Switzerland) Kurt Röthlisberger (Suhr)
Note: Debut for OB playerr Christian Egli

3 November 1991 Round 18	Basel	5–2	Châtel-Saint-Denis	St. Jakob Stadium, Basel
14:30	Jenzer 14' (1:0); Baumgartner 18' (2:0); Baumgartner 30' (3:0); Gottardi (yellow card) 71'; Marcolli 73' (4:2); Sitek 84' (5:2)	FCB summary	(yellow card) 39' (yellow-red card) 78' Carrel; 31' (3:1) Blasco; 51' (3:2) Blasco; (yellow card) 70' Menoud; (yellow card) 75' Cavalcante; (yellow card) 84' Salad	Attendance: 2,900; Referee: (Switzerland) Bettex

9 November 1991 Round 19	ES Malley	0–1	Basel	Stade du Bois Gentil, Malley
14:30		FCB summary	(yellow card) 32' Jeitziner; (yellow card) 36' Bauer; (yellow card) 57' Mancastroppa; 85' (0:1) Sitek; (yellow card) 90+2' Gottardi	Attendance: 500; Referee: (Switzerland) Ludwig Zurkirchen

17 November 1991 Round 20	Fribourg	2–3	Basel	Stade Universitaire, Freiburg
14:30	Gaspoz (yellow card) 30'; Eberhard 44' (pen. 1:1); Rudakow 77' (2:2); Maier (yellow card) 81'	FCB summary	23' (0:1) Sitek; (yellow card) 43' Sitek; 76' (1:2) Sitek; (yellow card) 85' Ceccaroni; 89' (2:3) Sitek	Attendance: 1,015; Referee: (Switzerland) Marcel Vollenweider (Rüti, Zürich)

24 November 1991 Round 21	SR Delémont	0–2	Basel	La Blancherie, Delémont
14:30	István Varga (red card) 61'	FCB summary	32' (0:1) Jenzer; (yellow card) 50' Gottardi; 67' (0:2) Rahmen	Attendance: 1,850; Referee: (Switzerland) Erwin Fölmli

1 December 1991 Round 22	Basel	1–3	Grenchen	St. Jakob Stadium, Basel
14:30	Baumgartner (yellow card) 49'; Marcolli 88' (1:2)	FCB summary	26' (0:1) Wenger; (yellow card) 43' Christ; 56' (0:2) Wenger; (yellow card) 77' Chételat; (yellow card) 80' Bruder; 90+3' (1:3) Fanciulli	Attendance: 3,100; Referee: (Switzerland) Willy Hänni

==== League table ====
Pos	Team	Pld	W	D	L	GF	GA	GD	Pts	Qualification
1	Basel	22	13	5	4	42	30	+12	31	Promotion round
2	Grenchen	22	10	7	5	40	27	+13	27	Promotion round
3	Yverdon-Sports	22	11	5	6	47	34	+13	27	Promotion round
4	Bulle	22	9	8	5	45	29	+16	26	Promotion round
5	ES Malley	22	11	4	7	36	30	+6	26	Promotion round
6	La Chaux-de-Fonds	22	8	9	5	33	23	+10	25	Promotion round
7	Old Boys	22	9	5	8	38	26	+12	23	Relegation round
8	Urania Genève Sport	22	9	5	8	37	33	+4	23	Relegation round
9	Fribourg	22	8	4	10	35	37	−2	20	Relegation round
10	Etoile Carouge	22	5	5	12	33	56	−23	15	Relegation round
11	Châtel-Saint-Denis	22	5	4	13	22	45	−23	14	Relegation round
12	SR Delémont	22	2	3	17	22	60	−38	7	Relegation round

Source: rsssf.com
Rules for classification: 1) Points; 2) Goal difference; 3) Goals scored; 4) Head-to-head points; 5) Away goals scored; 6) Draw.

==== Promotion/relegation Phase Group A ====
1 March 1992 Round 1	Basel	1–1	Yverdon-Sports	St. Jakob Stadium, Basel
14:30	Bauer (yellow card) 10'; Sitek 67' (1:0); Ceccaroni (yellow card) 86'	FCB summary	67' (1:1) Comisetti; (yellow card) 72' Castro	Attendance: 5,300; Referee: (Switzerland) Daniel Roduit (Sion)
Note: Referee Roduit suffered a partial muscle tear in the 39th minute and, with the agreement of both captains, was replaced at halftime by NLB referee Palama from Delémont, who happened to be present. Yverdon protested, arguing that FC Basel had fielded one too many non-Swiss players. FC Basel had fielded six non-Swiss players, which was permitted for NLB clubs (NLA clubs: five non-Swiss players).

8 March 1992 Round 2	Aarau	0–0	Basel	Stadion Brügglifeld, Aarau
14:30	Heldmann (yellow card) 53'; Rossi (yellow card) 84'	FCB summary FCA summary	(yellow card) 47' Ceccaroni; (yellow card) 80' Marcolli	Attendance: 6,100; Referee: (Switzerland) Arturo Martino (Neukirch an der Thur)
Note: Aarau were without the injured Kilian and Saibene, as well as Komornicki (excess foreign player). FC Basel were without the injured Dittus, Heidenreich, and Zbinden, and without the suspended Bauer. 57th minute, Wagner was substituted out with a suspected muscle strain.

15 March 1992 Round 3	Basel	2–2	Lugano	St. Jakob Stadium, Basel
14:30	Rahmen 3' (1:0); Epars (yellow card) 14'; Zbinden 52' (2:1); Rahmen (yellow card) 62'; Steiner (yellow card) 82'	FCB summary	6' (1:1) Andrioli; (yellow card) 7' Andrioli; 63' (2:2) Graciani; (yellow card) 65' Sylvestre	Attendance: 7,300; Referee: (Switzerland) Werner Müller (Obererlinsbach)
Note: FC Basel were without the injured Heidenreich, Wagner, and Dittus, and without the suspended Ceccaroni. Lugano were without the injured goalkeepers Philipp Walker (injured in Saturday's training session) and Zufli, as well as the suspended Penzavalli. 22nd minute, Pelosi was substituted out with a suspected serious foot injury and taken to hospital for examination.

22 March 1992 Round 4	Bellinzona	2–1	Basel	Stadio Comunale Bellinzona
14:30	Englund (yellow card) 44'; Eggeling 51' (1:0); Perini 85' (2:1)	FCB summary	(yellow card) 45' Bauer; (yellow card) 50' Jeitziner; 72' (pen. 1:1) Zbinden; (yellow card) 78' Bounoua	Attendance: 1,000; Referee: (Switzerland) Michel Zen Ruffinen
Note: Bellinzona were without the injured Lombardo, Morocutti, and Pedrazzi; goalkeeper Paolo Andreoli was only a substitute. FCB were without the suspended Steiner and Rahmen, without the injured Dittus, Heidenreich, Mancastroppa, and Wagner, and without Ceccaroni (angina). 28th minute, Zbinden's corner kick hit the crossbar.

4 April 1992 Round 5	Basel	3–3	Baden	St. Jakob Stadium, Basel
17:30	Zbinden 52' (pen. 1:0); Kok 54' (2:0); Zbinden 65' (3:1); Jeitziner (yellow card) 67'; Zbinden (yellow card) 79'	FCB summary	(yellow card) 58' Casamento; 65' (pen. 2:1) Di Muro; 70' (3:2) Stoop; 72' (3:3) Casamento; (yellow card) 76' Crausaz	Attendance: 3,223; Referee: (Switzerland) Jürg Herrmann (Hinterkapplen (Wohlen bei Bern))
Note: FC Basel without Rahmen (broken hand in final training), Dittus (injured), Gottardi (lumbago), Heidenreich, Wagner and Mancatroppa (all recovering, all in action with the youth team). FC Baden without Perez (injured), Schlatter (injured) and Hedinger (ill).

8 April 1992 Round 6	Locarno	3–0	Basel	Stadio del Lido, Locarno
20:00	Costas (yellow card) 19'; Schönwetter 24' (pen. 1:0); Tognini (yellow card) 42'; Pedrotti (yellow card) 43'; Ursea 48' (2:0); Gianfreda (red card) 56'; Neuville 74' (3:0)	FCB summary	(yellow card) 23' Heidenreich; (yellow card) 38' Sitek; (penalty missed) Zbinden56′ (red card) 65' Heidenreich	Attendance: 700; Referee: (Switzerland) Werner Müller (Obererlinsbach)
Note: Locarno were without the injured Morandi, Bommarito and Zjajo; FC Basel were without the injured Rahmen and Dittus, as well as Gottardi (not in the squad). 56th minute, Sachetti held the penalty from Zbinden.

11 April 1992 Round 7	ES Malley	0–2	Basel	Stade du Bois Gentil, Malley
17:30	Favre (red card) 90+8'	FCB summary	(yellow card) 17' Sitek; 19' (0:1) Sitek; 41' (0:2) Baumgartner	Attendance: 750; Referee: (Liechtenstein) Roland Beck (Triesenberg)
Note: Malley without Vigh (injured); Basel without Dittus (recovering), Rahmen (hand in cast, but can train), Jenzer (groin problems, had surgery that day) and Heidenreich (served the first of his three suspensions, after being sent-off in the Locarno game).

20 April 1992 Round 8	Basel	1–0	ES Malley	St. Jakob Stadium, Basel
14:30	Sitek 23' (1:0); Schweizer (yellow card) 45'; Kok (yellow card) 63'	FCB summary	(yellow card) 65' Camerieri	Attendance: 8,000; Referee: (Switzerland) Pierre-Alain Vuillemin (Geneva)
Note: FCB without Rahmen, Dittus (both injured) and Heidenreich (last suspension); Malley without Gavillet (suspended), Vigh and Boucard (both injured).

25 April 1992 Round 9	Basel	2–2	Locarno	St. Jakob Stadium, Basel
17:30	Bauer (yellow card) 38'; Baumgartner 67' (1:1); Jeitziner 84' (2:1); Mancastroppa (yellow card) 90'	FCB summary	26' (0:1) Neuville; 88' (2:2) Bützer; (yellow card) 90+1' Neuville	Attendance: 8,300; Referee: (Switzerland) Gottfried Friedrich (Seedorf, Uri)
Note: FCB without the suspended Schweizer and the injured Sitek, Locarno without the suspended Costas and the injured Omini.

2 May 1992 Round 10	Baden	2–1	Basel	Esp Stadium, Fislisbach
20:00	Schlatter (yellow card) 24'; Maurer (yellow card) 40'; Stoop (yellow card) 44'; Casamento 82' (1:1); Born 90+3' (2:1)	FCB summary	64' (0:1) Jeitziner; (yellow card) 90+2' Baumgartner	Attendance: 2,500; Referee: (Switzerland) Marcel Despland (Yverdon-les-Bains)
Note: Baden were without Staubli, Crausaz (both injured) and Hodel (suspended). Basel were without Jenzer and Dittus (both injured). 35th minute, Born's shot hit the crossbar. 82nd minute, Baden's goalkeeper Mäder was hit on the head by a projectile thrown from the Basel supporters' section and he received a four minute treatment.

9 May 1992 Round 11	Basel	2–1	Bellinzona	St. Jakob Stadium, Basel
20:00	Jeitziner 76' (pen. 1:1); Sitek (yellow card) 72'; Sitek 87' (2:1)	FCB summary	(yellow card) 27' Perini; 45' (0:1) Esposito; (yellow card) 82' Schaer	Attendance: 1,010; Referee: (Switzerland) Claude Detruche, (Thônex)
Note: Basel were without Kok, Bauer (both suspended), Dittus and Jenzer (both injured). Bellinzona were without De Lusi, C. Andreoli (both suspended), Petrazzi (injured) and Perucchini (ill). 71st minute, Sitek's header goal was disallowed due to a foul.

16 May 1992 Round 12	Lugano	1–1	Basel	Cornaredo, Lugano
20:00	Bauer (yellow card) 37'; Jeitziner 78' (1:1); Marcolli (yellow card) 84'	FCB summary	41' (pen. 0:1) Galvão; (red card) 78' Andrioli	Attendance: 2,200; Referee: (Switzerland) Werner Müller (Obererlinsbach)
Note: Lugano without Piccioli, Jensen, Fornera, Sylvestre, Pedrazzi (all injured) and Marco Walker (suspended). Basel without Zbinden (injured).

23 May 1992 Round 13	Basel	2–4	Aarau	St. Jakob Stadium, Basel
20:00	Gottardi (yellow card) 42'; Baumgartner (yellow card) 56'; Sitek 58' (1:4); Sitek 76' (2:4)	FCB summary	14' (0:1) Heldmann; 16' (0:2) Wassmer; (yellow card) 35' Meier; 50' (0:3) Aleksandrov; 56' (pen. 0:4) Sutter	Attendance: 2,500; Referee: (Switzerland) Peter Kellenberger
Note: Basel without Zbinden, Epars, Dittus, Jenzer (all injured) and Wagner (youth team). Aarau without Juchli, Komornicki, Fluri, and Koch (all injured).

30 May 1992 Round 14	Yverdon-Sports	1–2	Basel	Stade Municipal, Yverdon
20:00	Kékesi (yellow card) 51'; Castro (yellow card) 75'; Kékesi 80' (1:2)	FCB summary	(yellow card) 35' Baumgartner; 38' (0:1) Sitek; (yellow card) 43' Ceccaroni; (yellow card) 55' Gottardi; 56' (0:2) Sitek; (yellow card) 77' Jeitziner; (yellow card) 84' Zbinden	Attendance: 5,700; Referee: (Switzerland) Freddy Philippoz (Sion)
Note: Basel without Bauer and Epars (both injured).

==== League table Group A ====
Pos	Team	Pld	W	D	L	GF	GA	GD	Pts	Qualification
1	Lugano	14	8	6	0	25	8	+17	22	Remain in Nationalliga A 1992–93
2	Aarau	14	7	5	2	20	13	+7	19	Remain in Nationalliga A 1992–93
3	Yverdon-Sports	14	6	6	2	24	17	+7	18	Remain in Nationalliga B 1992–93
4	Basel	14	4	6	4	20	22	−2	14	Remain in Nationalliga B 1992–93
5	Baden	14	2	9	3	14	16	−2	13	Remain in Nationalliga B 1992–93
6	Locarno	14	3	4	7	19	19	0	10	Remain in Nationalliga B 1992–93
7	ES Malley	14	3	4	7	18	30	−12	10	License revoked Relegated to 1992–93 1. Liga
8	Bellinzona	14	2	2	10	14	29	−15	6	Remain in Nationalliga B 1992–93

Source: rsssf.com
Rules for classification: 1) Points; 2) Goal difference; 3) Goals scored; 4) Head-to-head points; 5) Away goals scored; 6) Draw.

=== Swiss Cup ===
1 September 1991 Round 2	FC Einsiedeln	2–6	Basel	Rappenmöösli, Einsiedeln
15:30	M. Schnidrig 1' (1:0); Stäheli (yellow card) 4'; Kloiber 89' (2:6)	FCB summary	24' (1:1) Schweizer; 32' (1:2) Sitek; 45' (1:3) Marcolli; 48' (1:4) Schweizer; 65' (1:5) Wagner; 68' (1:6) Sitek	Attendance: 720; Referee: (Switzerland) Erwin Fölmli
Note: FC Basel played without the injured Dittus and Heidenreich, as well as without Gottardi, who served his only suspension after being sent off against Fribourg. Sitek's goal (27th minute) was disallowed for offside.

29 September 1991 Round 3	FC Willisau	0–2	Basel	Sportzentrum Schlossfeld, Willisau
15:00	Fries (yellow card) 9'; Tanner (yellow card) 46'	FCB summary	(yellow card) 16' Jenzer; (yellow card) 45' Heidenreich; 70' (0:1) M. Rahmen; 81' (0:2) M. Rahmen	Attendance: 1,050; Referee: (Switzerland) Werner Müller (Obererlinsbach)
Note: FC Willisau without their best striker Möstl (suspended), FC Basel without the injured Grüter, Dittus and Wagner as well as without the suspended Schweizer and Zbinden.

28 March 1992 Round 4	Basel	1–1 (a.e.t.) (4–2 p)	St. Gallen	St. Jakob Stadium, Basel
17:30	Schweizer (yellow card) 68'; Jeitziner 99' (1:0); Baumgartner (yellow card) 112'; Sitek (yellow card) 118'	FCB summary	(yellow card) 59' Raschle; (yellow card) 83' Hengartner; (yellow card) 85' Sidler; 116' (1:1) Sidler	Attendance: 5,000; Referee: (Switzerland) Manfred Schlup (Grenchen)
	Penalties
	Zbinden (penalty scored); Jeitziner (penalty scored); Schweizer (penalty scored); Ceccaroni (penalty scored)		(penalty scored) Fischer; (penalty scored) Wyss; (penalty missed) Raschle; (penalty missed) Djair
Note: FC Basel without the injured Heidenreich, Mancastroppa, Wagner, Dittus, and Jenzer. St. Gallen without the suspended Blättler.

16 April 1992 Round 5	Basel	5–1	Bern	St. Jakob Stadium, Basel
17:30	Baumgartner 6' (1:0); Jeitziner 29' (2:0); Marcolli 42' (3:0); Marcolli 69' (4:0); Jeitziner 84' (5:0)	FCB summary	(yellow card) 28' Zurkinden; (yellow card) 51' Grossenbacher; 85' (pen. 5:1) Zurkinden	Attendance: 3,800; Referee: (Switzerland) Dieter Schoch (Attiswil)
Note: Basel will be without Heidenreich and Sitek (suspended) as well as Dittus, Mancastroppa, Rahmen and Jenzer (all injured). Bern will be without Marty and Gosteli (injured) and Zürcher (retired).

5 May 1992 Quarterfinal	Basel	2–3	Lugano	St. Jakob Stadium, Basel
20:00	Heidenreich 45+2' (1:1); Bauer (yellow card) 64'; Sitek 66' (2:1); Kok (yellow card) 82'	Summary	14' (0:1) Graciani; (yellow card) 34' Carrasco; 86' (2:2) Walker; 90+2' (2:3) Andrioli	Attendance: 7,700; Referee: (Switzerland) Urs Meier (Wettingen and Würenlos)
Note: FCB without Baumgartner (suspended). Lugano without Tami and Zuffi (both suspended). 40th minute, Heidenreich's shot hit the right post, then the left post and rolled back into play.

== See also ==
- History of FC Basel
- List of FC Basel players
- List of FC Basel seasons

== Sources ==
- Rotblau: Jahrbuch Saison 2015/2016. Publisher: FC Basel Marketing AG. ISBN 978-3-7245-2050-4
- Die ersten 125 Jahre / 2018. Publisher: Josef Zindel im Friedrich Reinhardt Verlag, Basel. ISBN 978-3-7245-2305-5
- The FCB squad 1991–92 at fcb-archiv.ch
- 1991–92 at RSSSF
