= 1991–92 Swiss Cup =

Tournament details
- Country: Switzerland
- Teams: 195

Final positions
- Champions: FC Luzern
- Runners-up: FC Lugano

Tournament statistics
- Matches played: 194

The 1991–92 Swiss Cup was the 67th season of Switzerland's annual football cup competition. It began on 17 August with the first games of Round 1 and ended on Whit Monday 8 June 1992 with the Final held at Wankdorf, Bern. The winners earned a place in the first round of the Cup Winners' Cup.

== Overview ==
The competition began on the week-end 17–18 August 1991 with the games of the first round and ended on Whit Monday 8 June 1992 with the final held at the former Wankdorf Stadium in Bern. The 24 clubs from the Nationalliga B were granted byes for the first round. The 12 clubs from the Nationalliga A were granted byes for the first two rounds. The winners of the cup qualified themselves for the first round of the Cup Winners' Cup in the next season.

The draw was respecting regionalities, when possible, and the lower classed team was granted home advantage. In the entire competition, the matches were played in a single knockout format. In the event of a draw after 90 minutes, the match went into extra time. In the event of a draw at the end of extra time, a penalty shoot-out was to decide which team qualified for the next round. No replays were foreseen, except in the case that the final ended level after extra time.

== Round 1 ==
In the first round a total of 160 clubs participated from the third-tier and lower. Reserve teams were not admitted to the competition.

=== Summary ===
Team 1	Score	Team 2
17–18 August 1991
Grand-Lancy	0–0 (a.e.t.) (3–4 p)	Chênois
FC Cologny-Geneva	1–4	FC Versoix
FC Plan-les-Ouates	4–5	FC Collex-Bossy
US Meinier GE	1–5	Stade Nyonnais
FC Founex	0–3	FC Renens
Gland	1–2 (a.e.t.)	Vevey Sports
FC Lutry	5–1	FC Jorat-Mezières
FC Lonay	1–5	Echallens
FC Moudon	2–4	Concordia/Folgore Lausanne
Stade Lausanne	3–1	Montreux-Sports
FC Valmont-Montagny	0–8	Baulmes
Azzurri Yverdon	1–3	FC Domdidier
FC Conthey	1–10	Martigny-Sports
FC Naters	1–3	FC Fully
FC Vouvry	0–1	FC Raron
FC Lalden	0–7	Monthey
FC Chalais	0–4	FC Aigle
FC Grône	2–3	FC Savièse
FC Farvagny-Ogoz	0–0 (a.e.t.) (3–4 p)	Central Fribourg
CS Romontois	3–2	FC Beauregard Fribourg
FC Saint-Blaise	2–4	Serrières
ASI Audax-Friul (NE)	0–2	Colombier
FC Superga (La Chaux-de-Fonds)	1–0	FC Le Locle
FC Alle	0–2	Moutier
FC Bure	0–0 (a.e.t.) (4–3 p)	Laufen
FC Cornol	3–0	FC Bassecourt
SC Ostermundigen	1–2 (a.e.t.)	FC Bern
FC Wyler (BE)	0–3	SV Lyss
FC Ueberstorf	3–2 (a.e.t.)	Münsingen
FC Muri-Gümlingen	1–2	Thun
FC Langnau im Emmental (BE)	3–0	FC Herzogenbuchsee
FC Orpund	2–2 (a.e.t.) (5–7 p)	FC Ins
FC Frutigen	1–6	FC Lerchenfeld (Thun)
FC Zollikofe	1–0 (a.e.t.)	FC Nidau
FC Schmitten	0–7	Bümpliz
FC Olten	0–4	Solothurn
FC Welschenrohr	0–3	FC Klus-Balstahl
FC Gerlafingen	0–4	Burgdorf
FC Zuchwil	5–2	FC Kölliken
Wangen bei Olten	4–4 (a.e.t.) (8–6 p)	FC Sursee
FC Gränichen	1–4 (a.e.t.)	FC Suhr
Wohlen	1–2 (a.e.t.)	FC Brugg
FC Lenzburg	0–2	FC Muri (AG)
FC Oberwil	2–4	FC Allschwil
Muttenz	1–5	FC Riehen
Internazionale Basel	2–1	FC Breitenbach
FC Aesch	1–6	Nordstern Basel
FC Frick	3–2	FC Pratteln
FC Therwil	1–3	Concordia Basel
Kickers Luzern	2–4	FC Einsielden
FC Hergiswil	0–4	Buochs
SC Erstfeld	3–4 (a.e.t.)	FC Küssnacht am Rigi
FC Willisau	3–1	FC Emmen
FC Sarnen	1–6	FC Littau
FC Glattfelden	4–0	FC Beringen
FC Fehraltorf	0–6	FC Embrach
FC Wetzikon	1–2	Bülach
FC Oberglatt	0–4	SC Veltheim (Winterthur)
FC Dübendorf	0–1	Young Fellows
FC Seefeld (ZH)	2–0	FC Männedorf
FC Adliswil	0–3	FC Zug
FC Rüti	0–3	Tuggen
FC Küsnacht (ZH)	5–1 (a.e.t.)	FC Wiedikon
FC Zürich-Affoltern	1–0	FC Kilchberg}
FC Spreitenbach	1–4	FC Altstetten (Zürich)
FC Münchwilen	1–3	Brühl
St. Otmar	0–1	Wil
Gossau	2–1	Herisau
FC Wittenbach	1–0	FC Winkeln (St.Gallen)
FC Gams	1–4	Balzers
FC Au	1–3	FC Altstätten (St. Gallen)
FC Amriswil	1–2	Kreuzlingen
Arbon	0–2 (a.e.t.)	Frauenfeld
FC Staad	0–3	FC Rorschach
Biaschesi	2–1 (a.e.t.)	FC Brunnen
FC Stabio	1–2	Mendrisio
FC Morbio	4–0	FC Ligornetto
FC Rapid Lugano	1–2	FC Tresa
FC Maggia	2–0	FC Ascona

- Red Star qualified for the second round with a bye for the first round.

== Round 2 ==
The 24 clubs from the Nationalliga B were granted byes for the first round and joined the competition in the second round. These teams were seeded and cound not be drawn against each other. The draw respected regionalities, when possible, and the lower classed team was granted home advantage.

=== Summary ===
Team 1	Score	Team 2
31 August and 1 September 1991
FC Collex-Bossy	2–4	Étoile Carouge
FC Versoix	0–4	Urania Genève Sport
Stade Nyonnais	0–3	Chênois
Monthey	3–0	Stade Lausanne
FC Renens	0–5	ES Malley
Echallens	3–0	FC Fully
FC Lutry	0–0 (a.e.t.) (3–5 p)	FC Aigle
Concordia/Folgore Lausanne	1–2	FC Domdidier
Vevey Sports	3–4 (a.e.t.)	Baulmes
FC Raron	1–5	FC Savièse
Martigny-Sports	1–5	Yverdon-Sport
Colombier	3–2 (a.e.t.)	Serrières
Solothurn	4–2	Bümpliz
FC Zuchwil	0–6	Burgdorf
FC Ueberstorf	0–2	FC Bern
FC Cornol	3–1	Delémont
Thun	3–2	Moutier
FC Lerchenfeld (Thun)	1–2	Grenchen
FC Zollikofen	2–1 (a.e.t.)	Bulle
FC Langnau im Emmental (BE)	1–4	FC Châtel-St-Denis
Central Fribourg	3–2	FC Superga (La Chaux-de-Fonds)
FC Bure	2–0	FC Klus-Balstahl
FC Ins	2–6	SV Lyss
Wangen bei Olten	0–4	Fribourg
CS Romontois	0–4	La Chaux-de-Fonds
FC Frick	1–9	Old Boys
FC Einsielden	2–6	Basel
FC Küssnacht am Rigi	0–1	FC Suhr
Internazionale Basel	0–4	Kriens
FC Brugg	0–1	Buochs
Nordstern Basel	1–0	SC Zug
FC Littau	0–3	Baden
FC Muri (AG)	3–2	FC Allschwil
FC Willisau	1–1 (a.e.t.) (5–4 p)	Concordia Basel
FC Riehen	3–1	Emmenbrücke
FC Altstetten (Zürich)	2–3 (a.e.t.)	FC Wil
FC Küsnacht (ZH)	3–1 (a.e.t.)	Kreuzlingen
Frauenfeld	2–2 (a.e.t.) (5–4 p)	Winterthur
FC Zug	1–2	Chur
Young Fellows	2–3	Tuggen
Bülach	1–4	FC Altstetten (Zürich)
FC Embrach	2–0	FC Glattfelden
SC Veltheim (Winterthur)	0–2	FC Glarus
FC Zürich-Affoltern	0–2	Brühl
FC Wittenbach	1–3	FC Seefeld (ZH)
Gossau	3–1 (a.e.t.)	FC Brüttisellen
Balzers	0–4	FC Schaffhausen
Red Star	2–1	FC Rorschach
Biaschesi	0–9	Chiasso
Mendrisio	1–2 (a.e.t.)	Locarno
FC Morbio	1–2 (a.e.t.)	FC Tresa
FC Maggia	0–4	Bellinzona

=== Matches ===
1 September 1991
15:30

FC Einsiedeln	2–6	Basel
Schnidrig 1' (1:0); Stäheli (yellow card) 4'; Kloiber 89' (2:6)	FCB summary	24' (1:1) Schweizer; 32' (1:2) Sitek; 45' (1:3) Marcolli; 48' (1:4) Schweizer; 65' (1:5) Wagner; 68' (1:6) Sitek

Rappenmöösli, Einsiedeln
Attendance: 720
Referee: (Switzerland) Erwin Fölmli

== Round 3 ==
The 12 clubs from the Nationalliga A were granted byes for the first two rounds and they joined the competition in this round. These teams were seeded and cound not be drawn against each other. The draw respected regionalities, when possible, and the lower classed team was granted home advantage.

=== Summary ===
Team 1	Score	Team 2
27 September 1991
FC Riehen	3–6 (a.e.t.)	Old Boys
Bellinzona	2–0	Zürich
28 September 1991
Baulmes	1–5	Lausanne-Sport
ES Malley	3–0 (a.e.t.)	Urania Genève Sport
Red Star	1–8	FC Schaffhausen
FC Zollikofen	0–2	SV Lyss
Burgdorf	1–6	FC Bern
FC Altstätten	2–2 (a.e.t.) (5–4 p)	Locarno
Colombier	0–6	Xamax
FC Glarus	0–7	Grasshopper Club
Brühl	0–5	Wettingen
FC Solothurn	0–1	FC Grenchen
FC Suhr	1–5	Luzern
FC Tresa/Monteggio	0–4	St. Gallen
FC Bure	0–10	Young Boys
FC Aigle	4–3 (a.e.t.)	Echallens
Chênois	1–2	Sion
29 September 1991
FC Embrach	0–2	FC Küsnacht
Monthey	0–0 (a.e.t.) (2–3 p)	Servette
Buochs	0–3	Aarau
FC Châtel-St-Denis	0–4	La Chaux-de-Fonds
FC Domdidier	1–2 (a.e.t.)	Yverdon-Sport
Frauenfeld	0–3	Lugano
Nordstern Basel	0–1	Baden
FC Muri	0–2	Kriens
FC Seefeld ZH	1–2	FC Wil
FC Willisau	0–2	Basel
FC Cornol	1–2	Fribourg
FC Savièse	2–1	Étoile-Carouge
Central Fribourg	2–0	FC Thun
Chur	1–0	Chiasso
Gossau	1–4	Tuggen

=== Matches ===
27 September 1991

FC Riehen	3–6 (a.e.t.)	Old Boys
Chiarelli 5' (1:0); Ceccaroni 58' (2:1); Ceccaroni 76' (3:3)	RSSSF summary	10' (1:1) Grüter; 60' (2:2) Maričić; 73' (2:3) Russo; 95' (3:4) du Buisson; 108' (3:5) du Buisson; 119' (3:6) Maričić

Sportplatz Grendelmatte, Riehen

27 September 1991

Bellinzona	2–1	Zürich
Esposito 23' (1:0); Eggeling 62' (2:0); De Lusi (yellow card) 90+1'	FCZ summary	89' (2:1) Milton

Stadio Comunale Bellinzona, Bellinzona
Attendance: 1,400
Referee: (Switzerland) Willi Rudin (Liestal)

28 September 1991

FC Glarus	0–7	Grasshopper Club
	RSSSF summary	22' (0:1) Bickel; 27' (0:2) Sforza; 53' (0:3) Guillod; 57' (0:4) Közle; 68' (0:5) Marchand; 78' (0:6) Marchand; 82' (0:7) Sforza

Buchholz, Glarus

28 September 1991

FC Bure	0–10	Young Boys
	YB summary	3' (0:1) Jakobsen; 19' (0:2) Jakobsen; 39' (0:3) Kunz; 42' (0:4) Kunz; 56' (0:5) Gross; 61' (o.g.) (M.Vallat); 65' (0:7) Dario; 82' (0:8) Bohinen; 83' (0:9) Kunz; 87' (0:10) Bohinen

Croix-de-Pierre, Bure, Switzerland
Attendance: 1.400
Referee: (Switzerland) Francis Fischer

28 September 1991

Monthey	0–0 (a.e.t.)	Servette
	Servette summary
Penalties
Penalty missed Penalty scored	2–3	Penalty scored Penalty missed

Stade Philippe Pottier, Monthey

29 September 1991

Buochs	0–3	Aarau
	FCA summary	19' (0:1) Komornicki; 75' (pen.) René Sutter; 75' (0:3) Komornicki

Stadion Seefeld, Buochs
Attendance: 1,500
Referee: (Switzerland) René Kellenberger (Herisau)

29 September 1991
15:00

FC Willisau	0–2	Basel
Fries (yellow card) 9'; Tanner (yellow card) 46'	FCB summary	(yellow card) 16' Jenzer; (yellow card) 45' Heidenreich; 70' (0:1) M. Rahmen; 81' (0:2) M. Rahmen

Sportzentrum Schlossfeld, Willisau
Attendance: 1,050
Referee: (Switzerland) Werner Müller (Obererlinsbach)

== Round 4 ==
=== Summary ===
Team 1	Score	Team 2
27 March 1992
Fribourg	0–2	Young Boys
28 March 1992
SV Lyss	0–1	Servette
ES Malley	2–1	La Chaux-de-Fonds
Tuggen	2–1	Old Boys
FC Bern	1–0	FC Aigle
Basel	1–1 (a.e.t.) (4–2 p)	St. Gallen
29 March 1992
Baden	2–1	Aarau
Bellinzona	1–2	Lugano
Chur	0–0 (a.e.t.) (4–5 p)	Wettingen
Grenchen	0–1	Luzern
FC Schaffhausen	1–4	Grasshopper Club
FC Wil	0–2	Kriens
Central Fribourg	0–8	Lausanne-Sport
FC Savièse	1–5	Sion
Yverdon-Sport	1–1 (a.e.t.) (6–5 p)	Xamax
FC Küsnacht	1–1 (a.e.t.) (3–1 p)	FC Altstätten

=== Matches ===
27 March 1992

Fribourg	0–2	Young Boys
	YB summary	61' (0:1) Baumann; 76' (0:2) Kunz

Stade Universitaire Saint-Léonard, Fribourg
Attendance: 1,050
Referee: (Switzerland) Willi Rudin (Liestal)

28 March 1992

SV Lyss	0–1	Servette
	Servette summary	17' (0:1) Molnar

Sportzentrum Grien, Lyss

28 March 1992

Tuggen	2–1	Old Boys
Federli 56' (1:0); Helbling 83' (2:1)	RSSSF summary	68' (1:1) du Buisson

Linthstrasse, Tuggen

28 March 1992
17:30

Basel	1–1 (a.e.t.)	St. Gallen
Schweizer (yellow card) 68'; Jeitziner 99' (1:0); Baumgartner (yellow card) 112'; Sitek (yellow card) 118'	FCB summary	(yellow card) 59' Raschle; (yellow card) 83' Hengartner; (yellow card) 85' Sidler; 116' (1:1) Sidler
Penalties
Zbinden (penalty scored); Jeitziner (penalty scored); Schweizer (penalty scored); Ceccaroni (penalty scored)	4–2	(penalty scored) Fischer; (penalty scored) Wyss; (penalty missed) Raschle; (penalty missed) Djair

St. Jakob Stadium, Basel
Attendance: 5,000
Referee: (Switzerland) Manfred Schlup (Grenchen)

29 March 1992

Baden	2–1	Aarau
Wittmann 42' (1:1); Born 62' (2:1)	FCA summary	15' (0:1) Rossi

Esp Stadium, Baden
Attendance: 1,437
Referee: (Switzerland) Arturo Martino (Neukirch an der Thur)

28 March 1992

FC Schaffhausen	1–4	Grasshopper Club
Klinge 12' (1:0)	RSSSF summary	26' (1:1) Élber; 39' (1:2) Élber; 65' (1:3) Grétarsson; 71' (1:4) Sutter

Stadion Breite, Schaffhausen

== Round 5 ==
=== Summary ===
Team 1	Score	Team 2
16 April 1992
Basel	5–1	FC Bern
Grasshopper Club	1–0	ES Malley
Young Boys	0–1	Lausanne-Sport
Lugano	3–0	Baden
Luzern	2–0	Tuggen
Servette	3–0	Yverdon-Sport
Sion	4–0	FC Küsnacht
Wettingen	3–0	Kriens

=== Matches ===
16 April 1992
17:30

Basel	5–1	Bern
Baumgartner 6' (1:0); Jeitziner 29' (2:0); Marcolli 42' (3:0); Marcolli 69' (4:0); Jeitziner 84' (5:0)	FCB summary	(yellow card) 28' Zurkinden; (yellow card) 51' Grossenbacher; 85' (pen. 5:1) Zurkinden

St. Jakob Stadium, Basel
Attendance: 3,800
Referee: (Switzerland) Dieter Schoch

16 April 1992

Grasshopper Club	1–0	ES Malley
Élber 18' (1:0)	RSSSF summary

Hardturm, Zürich

16 April 1992

Young Boys	0–1	Lausanne-Sport
Reich (yellow card) 78'	YB summary	48' (0:1) van den Boogaard; (yellow card) 60' Herr; (yellow card) 85' La Placa

Wankdorf Stadium, Bern
Attendance: 5,400
Referee: (Switzerland) René Kellenberger (Herisau)

16 April 1992

Lugano	3–0	Baden
Zuffi 42' (1:0); Galvão 47' (2:0); Graciani 50' (3:0)	RSSSF summary

Cornaredo, Lugano

16 April 1992

Luzern	2–0	Tuggen
Nadig 67' (1_0); Nadig 90+1' (2:0)	RSSSF summary

Stadion Allmend, Luzern

16 April 1992

Servette	3–0	Yverdon-Sport
Molnar 24' (1:0); Sinval 82' (2:0); Sinval 88' (3:0)	Servette summary

Charmilles Stadium, Geneva

16 April 1992

Sion	4–0	FC Küsnacht
A. Rey 19' (1:0); Lopez 27' (2:0); Orlando 51' (3:0); Manfreda 69' (4:0)	RSSSF summary

Stade Tourbillon, Sion

16 April 1992

Wettingen	3–0	Kriens
Nyfeler 14' (1:0); Fink 37' (2:0); Nyfeler 70' (3:0)	RSSSF summary

Stadion Altenburg, Wettingen

== Quarter-finals ==
=== Summary ===
Team 1	Score	Team 2
5 May 1992
Servette	3–0	Lausanne-Sport
Basel	2–3	Lugano
Luzern	1–1 (a.e.t.) (5–4 p)	Sion
Wettingen	1–1 (a.e.t.) ((5–4 p)	Grasshopper Club

=== Matches ===
5 May 1992
19:00

Servette	3–0	Lausanne-Sport
Molnar 10' (1:0); Dobrovolski 49' (2:0); Sinval 90' (3:0)	Servette summary

Charmilles Stadium, Geneva

5 May 1992
20:00

Basel	2–3	Lugano
Heidenreich 45+2' (1:1); Bauer (yellow card) 64'; Sitek 66' (2:1); Kok (yellow card) 82'	FCB summary	14' (0:1) Graciani; (yellow card) 34' Carrasco; 86' (2:2) Walker; 90+2' (2:3) Andrioli

St. Jakob Stadium, Basel
Attendance: 7,700
Referee: (Switzerland) Urs Meier (Würenlos)

5 May 1992
20:00

Luzern	1–1 (a.e.t.)	Sion
Nadig 60' (1:1)	RSSSF summary	17' (0:1) Geiger
Penalties
Nadig (penalty scored); Knup (penalty scored); Wolf (penalty missed); Rueda (penalty scored); Tuce (penalty scored); Moser (penalty scored)	5–4	(penalty scored) Reto Gertschen; (penalty missed) Calderón; (penalty scored) Barbas; (penalty scored) Geiger; (penalty scored) Baljic; (penalty missed) Sauthier

Stadion Allmend, Luzern
Attendance: 9,050
Referee: (Switzerland) Francesco Bianchi (Chiasso)

5 May 1992
20:00

Wettingen	1–1 (a.e.t.)	Grasshopper Club
Romano 46' (1:0)	RSSSF summary	73' (1:1) Élber
Penalties
Romano (penalty scored); Andermatt (penalty scored); Közle (penalty scored); Widmer (penalty scored); Ackermann (penalty scored)	5–4	(penalty scored) Gren; (penalty scored) Bickel; (penalty scored) Élber; (penalty scored) Stević; (penalty missed) Sforza

Stadion Altenburg, Wettingen
Attendance: 1,900
Referee: (Switzerland) Gottfried Friedrich (Seedorf, Uri)

== Semi-finals ==
=== Summary ===
Team 1	Score	Team 2
12 May 1992
Luzern	4–0	Wettingen
19 May 1992
Servette	2–4 (a.e.t.)	Lugano

=== Matches ===
12 May 1992

Luzern	4–0	Wettingen
Camenzind 6' (1:0); Rueda 13' (2:0); Knup 15' (3:0); Nadig 81' (4:0)	RSSSF summary

Stadion Allmend, Luzern
Attendance: 15.400
Referee: (Switzerland) Manfred Schlup (Grenchen)

19 May 1992

Servette	2–4 (a.e.t.)	Lugano
Molnar 64' (1:1); Dobrovolski 87' (2:2)	Servette summary	31' (0:1) Zuffi; 76' (1:2) Graciani; 116' (2:3) Zuffi; 119' (2:4) Graciani

Charmilles Stadium, Geneva
Attendance: 9,300
Referee: (Switzerland) Bruno Galler (Kirchdorf, Bern)

== Final ==
=== Summary ===
Team 1	Score	Team 2
8 June 1992
Luzern	3–1	Lugano

=== Telegram ===
8 June 1992
15:00

Luzern	3–1 (a.e.t.)	Lugano
Moser 41' (1:1); Knup 96' (2:1); Knup 117' (3:1)	Fussball-Schweiz summary	36' (0:1) Andrioli

Wankdorf, Bern
Attendance: 40,000
Referee: (Switzerland) Arturo Martino (Neukirch an der Thur)

Luzern won the cup and this was the club's second cup title to this date.

== Sources and references ==
- Switzerland 1991/92 at RSSSF
