= Jorge Sosa =

Jorge Sosa may refer to:

- Jorge Sosa (footballer) (born 1968), Mexican football manager and former player
- Jorge Sosa (baseball) (born 1977), Dominican baseball player
- Jorge Sosa (murderer), Guatemalan commando convicted for murder for the Dos Erres massacre
