= Estadio Cuauhtémoc =

Football stadium in Puebla, Mexico

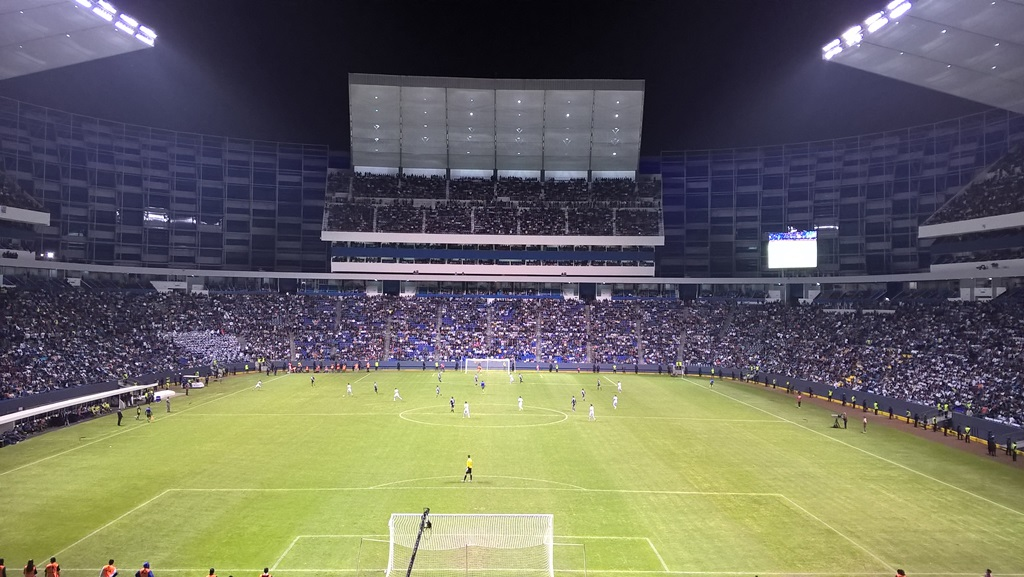
- Interactive map of Estadio Cuauhtémoc
- Location: Puebla City, Puebla, Mexico
- Coordinates: 19°04′41″N 98°09′52″W
- Owner: State of Puebla
- Operator: Club Puebla
- Capacity: 51,726
- Surface: Grass
- Field size: 105 x 68 m

Construction
- Opened: 8 October 1968
- Renovated: November 2015
- Builder: Pedro Ramírez Vázquez

Tenants
- Club Puebla (1968–present); Cruz Azul (2026); Mexico national football team (selected matches)

Estadio Cuauhtémoc is a football stadium in Puebla City, Mexico. It is the home of Club Puebla, which plays in Liga MX. With a capacity of 51,726 seats, Estadio Cuauhtémoc is the fourth-largest football stadium in Mexico. The stadium hosted games in the 1970 FIFA World Cup and the 1986 FIFA World Cup. From November 2014 – 2015, the stadium went through massive renovations.

It is the first stadium in Latin America to have a façade covered with ETFE.

== History ==
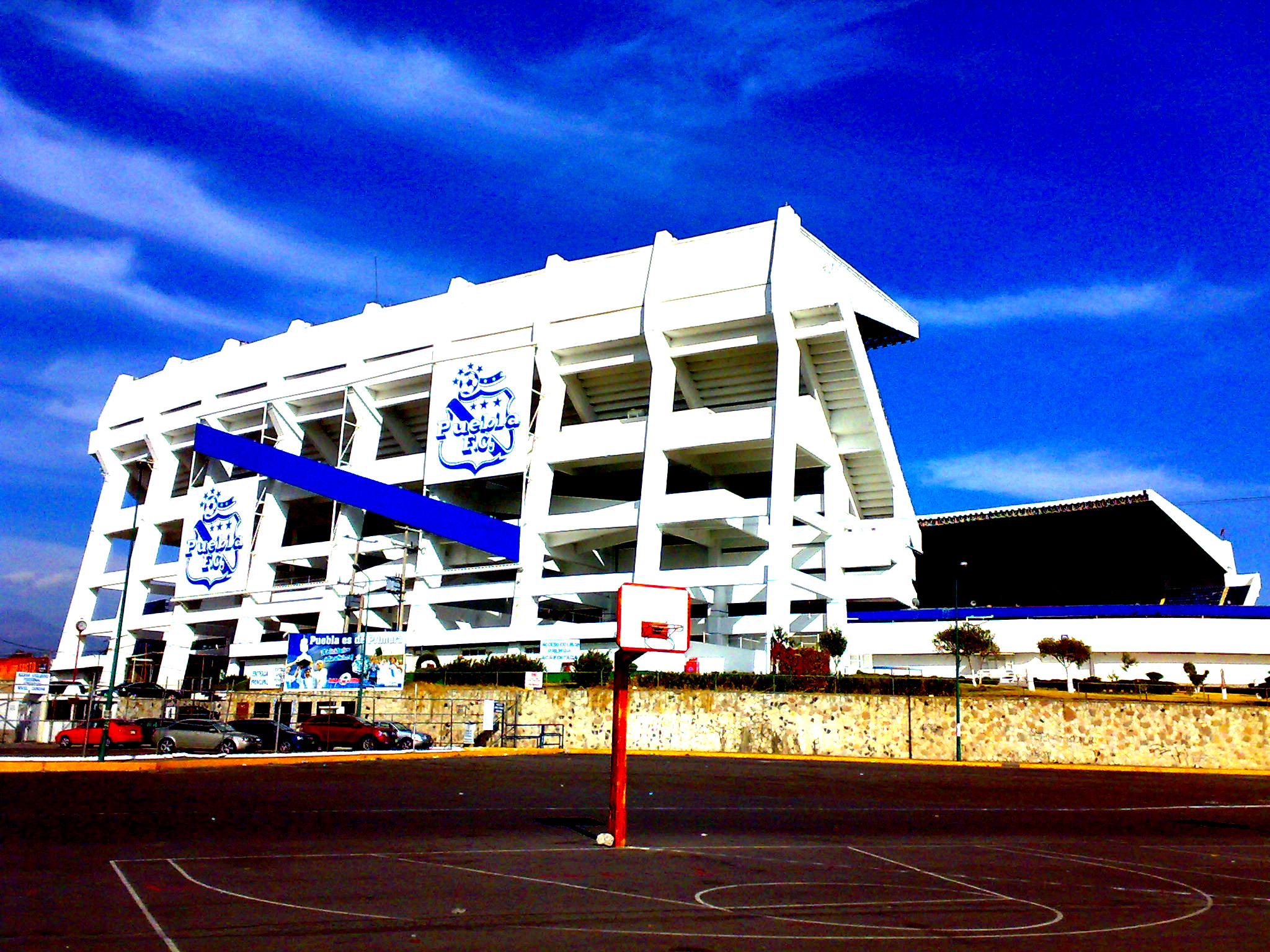
Estadio Cuauhtémoc, 2008

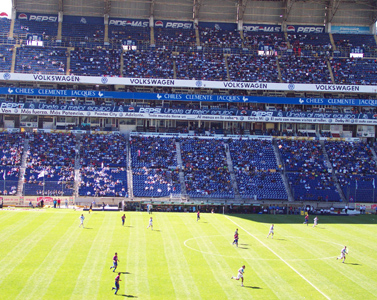
Estadio Cuauhtémoc, Puebla, Mexico. Picture taken in 2004.

Estadio Cuauhtémoc was originally designed in 1965 by architect Pedro Ramírez Vázquez, architect of the Estadio Azteca and the Basilica of Our Lady of Guadalupe. It was inaugurated on 6 October 1968 during preparations for the 1968 Summer Olympics. The stadium is named after the Mexican brewery Cuauhtémoc-Moctezuma, who paid for most of the construction.

The stadium initially had a capacity of 35,000 and was expanded to 42,648 for the 1986 FIFA World Cup. A mural that had been painted by Jesús Corro Ferrer, which represented the human race, was covered during the expansion project. Estadio Cuauhtémoc has the fourth-highest capacity of any football stadium in Mexico. The stadium has hosted two Mexican Primera División finals. The first came in the 1982-83 tournament when Puebla F.C. defeated C.D. Guadalajara; the second final was played in the 1989–90 tournament against Club Universidad de Guadalajara. The stadium has also hosted the now defunct Copa México tournament, which Club Puebla managed to win in 1990, becoming just the fifth stadium to host both finals and have its home team win.

Estadio Cuauhtémoc has also hosted international club tournaments, such as the CONCACAF Champions League and Copa Interamericana. In 2008 the stadium was supposed to host its first Copa Sudamericana tournament, but did not after the CONCACAF decided to pull out of all CONMEBOL competitions due to the clubs' lack of interest in the domestic conference tournaments.

=== 1970 FIFA World Cup ===
Estadio Cuauhtémoc played host to the Uruguay national football team for three group stage matches during the 1970 FIFA World Cup. In the first game on 2 June 1970 Uruguay defeated Israel 2-0. The second match was against Italy, which ended in a scoreless draw. The third match was against Sweden, where Uruguay fell 1-0.

=== 1986 FIFA World Cup ===
Puebla played a larger role in Mexico's second World Cup, which had been awarded due to the withdrawal of previous host Colombia. Estadio Cuauhtémoc hosted several group stage matches for defending champions Italy as well as Argentina.

In the round of 16 match, Argentina defeated Uruguay 1-0 in El Estadio Cuauhtémoc, which was played on 16 June 1986. In the quarter-finals, Estadio Cuauhtémoc hosted the match between Spain and Belgium with an attendance of 45,000, setting a stadium record.

=== 21st century ===
Puebla hosted the 2013 CONCACAF U-20 Championship, with Estadio Cuauhtémoc named one of the two venues for the tournament. The stadium also hosted the final between Mexico and the United States.

=== 2015 renovation ===
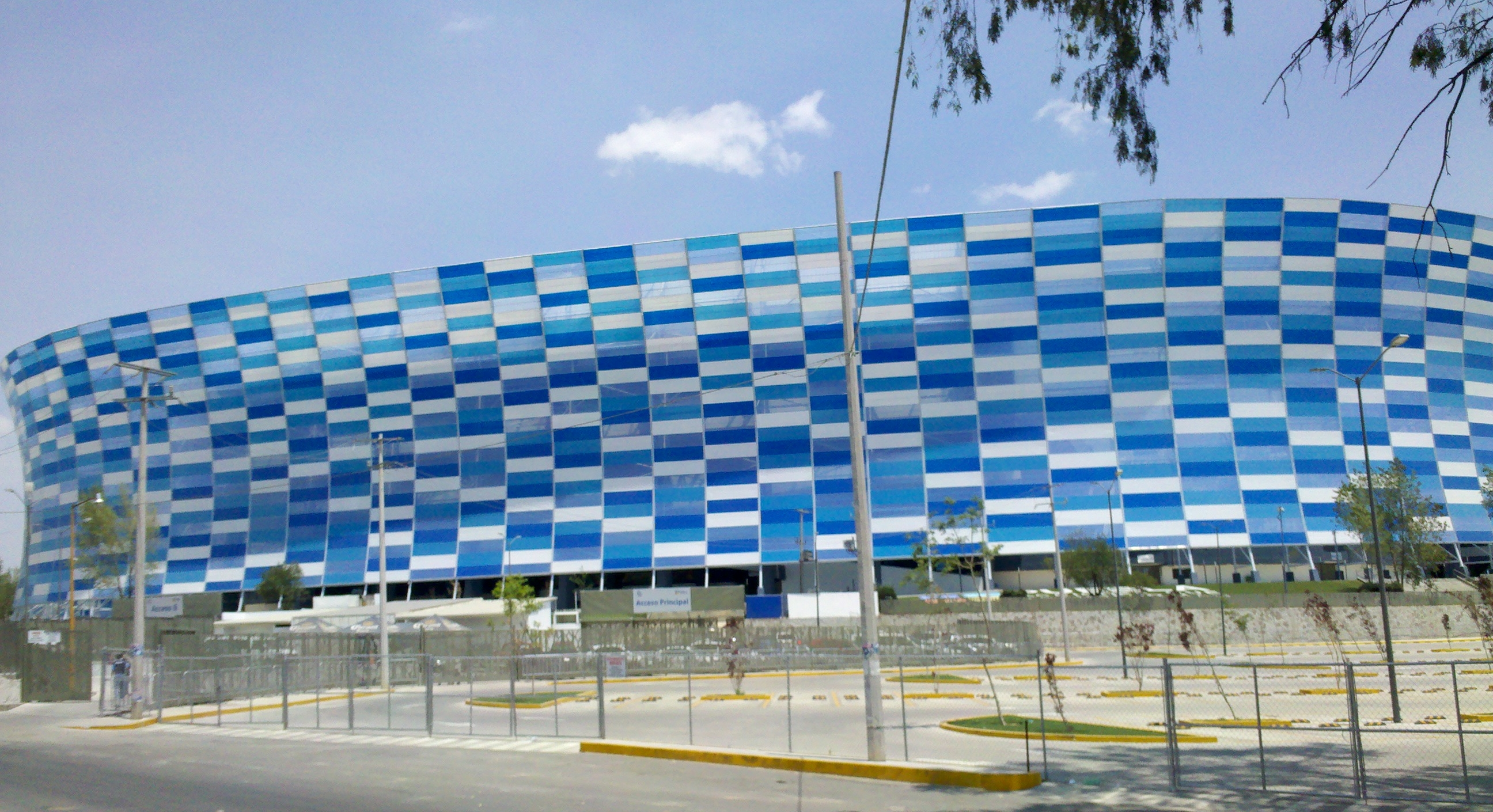
The exterior of Estadio Cuauhtémoc after its renovation

Rafael Moreno Valle Rosas, the governor of Puebla, announced a complete renovation of Estadio Cuauhtémoc in 2014. The stadium's capacity would increase from 42,648 to 51,726 spectators, two new ramps would be built, and other facilities were to be modernized. The exterior was covered in ETFE, a textile that had been used in other stadium projects globally.

Renovations started in November 2014 and were initially planned to be done by October 2015. Due to the city's rainy season, construction slowed down and in August 2015 it was announced that the completion would be delayed to November 2015. On 18 November, the stadium was reopened in a friendly match against Boca Juniors of Argentina before Puebla's final week of Liga MX Apertura 2015. On 12 December 2024, the stadium hosted the first leg of the Apertura 2024 final series between Club América and C.F. Monterrey, because América could not use the Estadio Ciudad de los Deportes due to the prohibition of simultaneous events at that venue and the Plaza de Toros México.

On 8 January 2026, Cruz Azul announced that they will play their home games at Estadio Cuauhtémoc during the Clausura 2026 tournament.

== Matches from World Cups and Olympic Games ==
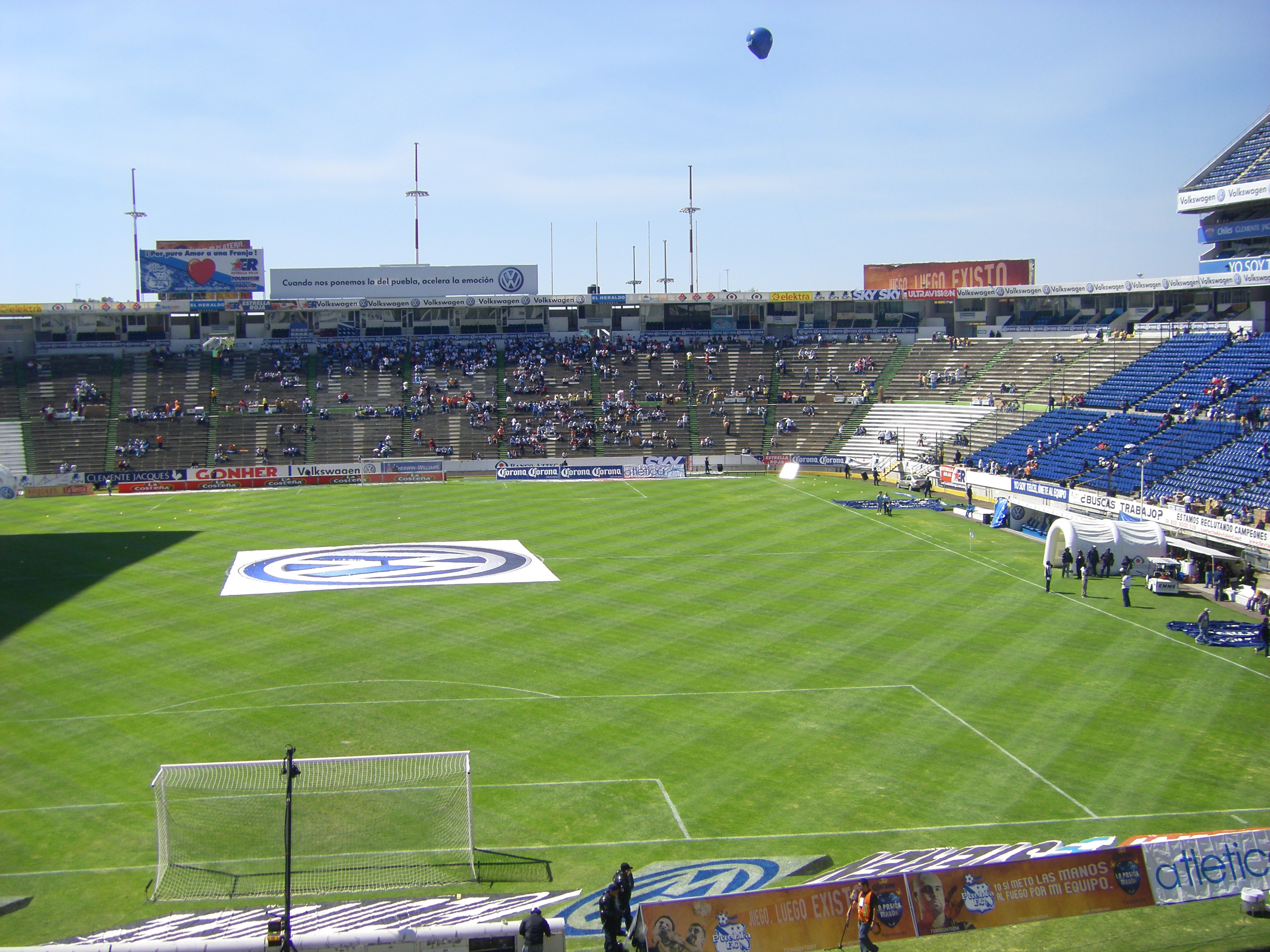
Estadio Cuauhtémoc, prior to renovation

1968 Summer Olympics Group A
Date	Match	Attendance
13 October 1968	France 1–0 Guinea	10,000
15 October 1968	Guinea 1–1 Colombia	10,000
17 October 1968	Colombia 1–4 France	10,000

1968 Summer Olympics Group B
Date	Match	Attendance
14 October 1968	Japan 3–1 Nigeria	10,000
16 October 1968	Brazil 1–1 Japan	10,000
18 October 1968	Brazil 3–3 Nigeria	10,000

1968 Summer Olympics - Quarterfinals
Date	Match	Attendance
20 October 1968	Mexico 2–0 Spain	10,000

1970 FIFA World Cup
Date	Match	Attendance
2 June 1970	Uruguay 2–0 Israel	20,659
6 June 1970	Uruguay 0–0 Italy	29,968
10 June 1970	Sweden 1–0 Uruguay	18,163

1986 FIFA World Cup
Date	Match	Attendance
5 June 1986	Italy 1–1 Argentina	32,000
10 June 1986	South Korea 2–3 Italy	20,000
16 June 1986	Argentina 1–0 Uruguay	26,000
22 June 1986	Spain 1–1 (4–5 pen.) Belgium	45,000
28 June 1986	France 4–2 Belgium	21,000

== Notable events ==
- 1968 Summer Olympics
- 1970 FIFA World Cup
- 1983 FIFA World Youth Championship
- 1986 FIFA World Cup
- Copa Interamericana
- 2013 CONCACAF Under-20 Championship

== See also ==
- List of football stadiums in Mexico
- Lists of stadiums
