= Gilbert Epars =

Swiss footballer (born 1969)

Personal information
- Full name: Gilbert Epars
- Date of birth: 10 April 1969 (age 57)
- Positions: Defender; midfielder

Youth career
- until 1986: Servette

Senior career*
Years	Team	Apps	(Gls)
1986–1991	Servette	62	(0)
1992	Basel	10	(0)
1992–1994	Urania Genève Sport	53	(3)
1994–1996	Étoile Carouge	30	(1)
- * Club domestic league appearances and goals

Gilbert Epars (born 10 April 1969) is a Swiss former footballer who played in the 1980s and 90s. He played mainly in the position as defender, but also as midfielder.

== Football career ==
Epars played his youth football by Servette and joined their first team in the 1986–87 Nationalliga A season. He stayed with them for five and a half seasons, but was not always regular starter.

Epars joined Basel during the winter break of their 1991–92 season under head coach Ernst August Künnecke. After playing in six test games Epars played his domestic league debut for his new club in the home game in the St. Jakob Stadium on 1 March 1992 as Basel played a 1–1 draw with Yverdon-Sports.

He remained with the club for the second half of the season and then moved on again. Epars played a total of 19 games for Basel without scoring a goal. 10 of these games were in the Nationalliga A, 3 in the Swiss Cup and 6 were friendly games.

Epars joined Urania Genève Sport, who at that time played in the second tier of Swiss football. Here he spent two seasons and then he moved on to play for Étoile Carouge.

== Sources ==
- Die ersten 125 Jahre. Publisher: Josef Zindel im Friedrich Reinhardt Verlag, Basel. ISBN 978-3-7245-2305-5
- Verein "Basler Fussballarchiv" Homepage
