= Walter Bernhard =

Swiss footballer (born 1971)

Personal information
- Full name: Walter Bernhard
- Date of birth: 24 April 1971 (age 55)
- Place of birth: Basel, Switzerland
- Positions: Midfielder; striker

Youth career
- until 1990: SV Muttenz

Senior career*
Years	Team	Apps	(Gls)
1990–1991	SV Muttenz		
1991–1992	FC Basel	3	(0)
1992–1993	FC Fribourg	18	(1)
1993–2002	SV Muttenz		
2002–2005	FC Breitenbach	42	(11)

Managerial career
- 2006–2007: SC Dornach
- * Club domestic league appearances and goals

Walter Bernhard (born 24 April 1971) is a Swiss retired footballer who played in the 1990s and 2000s mainly as striker, but also as midfielder.

Bernhard played his youth football with local club SV Muttenz and advanced to their first team for the 1990–91 season, in the fourth tier of Swiss football. Bernhard then joined Basel's first team for their 1991–92 season under head-coach Ernst-August Künnecke. After playing in five test games Bernhard played his domestic league debut for the club in the away game on 6 August 1991 as Basel were defeated 1–4 by Urania Genève Sport. In his one season with the club Bernhard played a total of 13 games for Basel without scoring a goal. Three of these games were in the Nationalliga A and 10 were friendly games.

After his time with Basel, Bernhard moved on to play for FC Fribourg. He played with them during the 1992–93 season, appearing in 18 domestic league games scoring one goal. As his contract was not prolonged Bernhard returned to his club of origin and played amateur football. Bernhard ended his active playing career in 2005 having spent the previous three seasons with FC Breitenbach, also in the fourth tier of Swiss football.

During the 2006–07 season Bernhard was coach for SC Dornach's first team. Later he was also coach for various other local clubs.

== Sources ==
- Die ersten 125 Jahre. Publisher: Josef Zindel im Friedrich Reinhardt Verlag, Basel. ISBN 978-3-7245-2305-5
- Verein "Basler Fussballarchiv" Homepage
