= Jamie Slater =

Welsh footballer

Personal information
- Full name: Jamie Slater
- Date of birth: 27 October 1968 (age 58)
- Place of birth: Wrexham, Wales
- Position: Forward

Youth career
- 1985–1987: Wrexham

Senior career*
| Years | Team | Apps | (Gls) |
| 1987-1988 | Wrexham | 7 | (1) |
| 1988-1989 | Northwich Victoria | | |
| 1989-1991 | Warrington Town | | |
- Lex XI
| 1997-1999 | Cefn Druids | | |

International career
| 1983–1984 | Wales Schoolboys U15 | | |
| 1984–1987 | Wales Schoolboys U18 | | |
| 1986–1987 | Wales U17 | | |
- * Club domestic league appearances and goals

Jamie Slater (born 27 October 1968) is a Welsh former professional footballer who played as a forward in the English Football League for Wrexham.

His youth career included being capped at Welsh schoolboy Under 15 level, three consecutive years at under-18 schoolboys level and also appearances for the Wales under-17 team managed by the former Wales senior manager, Mike England.

Following a summer tour with Everton FC in 1987, he signed a professional contract for Wrexham and made seven appearances in the English Football League Division Four and Welsh Cup competitions.

The following season he had a short spell with Northwich Victoria in the Conference League (without making any first team appearances) before moving onto play for Warrington Town in the North West Counties Football League for two seasons.

After a couple of years out through injury he returned to play for local clubs Lex XI and Cefn Druids where in 1999 he was part of the team that became champions of the Cymru Alliance and who were promoted into the League of Wales.

After his playing career, whilst working he also studied for his UEFA B coaching licence and has coached the under-12s at Denbigh Town and the Rhyl academy.
