= Igor Luzyakin =

Russian footballer and coach

Personal information
- Full name: Igor Nikolayevich Luzyakin
- Date of birth: 8 December 1968 (age 57)
- Place of birth: Oryol, Russian SFSR
- Height: 1.75 m (5 ft 9 in)
- Positions: Defender; midfielder

Team information
- Current team: FC Murom (assistant coach)

Youth career
- FC Spartak Oryol

Senior career*
Years	Team	Apps	(Gls)
1985–1986	FC Spartak Oryol	27	(1)
1989–1991	FC Spartak Oryol	107	(1)
1992	FC Olimpia Bălți	33	(6)
1993	FC Oryol	16	(6)
1993	FC Gornyak	21	(1)
1994	FC Oryol	18	(2)
1995	FC Gekris Anapa	37	(8)
1996	FC Okean Nakhodka	39	(1)
1997	FC Krylia Sovetov Samara	7	(0)
1998	FC Neftyanik Pokhvistnevo	25	(5)
1999–2002	FC Oryol	136	(7)
2003–2004	FC Ryazan-Agrokomplekt Ryazan	63	(0)
2005	FC Spartak-UGP Anapa	10	(0)
2006	FC Titan Klin (amateur)		
2007	FC Oryol (amateur)		

Managerial career
- 2008–2010: FC Rusichi Oryol (assistant)
- 2010–2012: FC Oryol
- 2012–2014: FC Oryol (assistant)
- 2014: FC Oryol
- 2019: FC Volna Kovernino (assistant)
- 2020–: FC Murom (assistant)
- * Club domestic league appearances and goals

Igor Nikolayevich Luzyakin (Russian: Игорь Николаевич Лузякин; born 8 December 1968) is a Russian professional football coach and a former player. He is an assistant coach with FC Murom.
