= Adelio Salinas =

Paraguayan footballer (born 1968)

Adelio Rubén Salinas Vallejos (born April 18, 1968) is a Paraguayan former footballer who played as a forward for clubs of Paraguay, Argentina, Chile and Indonesia.

== Teams ==
- (Paraguay) Cerro Corá 1990–1993
- (Argentina) Estudiantes de La Plata 1994
- (Paraguay) Cerro Corá 1995–1997
- (Chile) Everton 1997–1998
- (Chile) Deportes Ovalle 1999–2001
- (Chile) Unión La Calera 2002
- (Chile) Naval 2003
- (Indonesia) Persebaya Surabaya 2004–2005
