= Gary Blackford =

English footballer

Personal information
- Full name: Gary John Blackford
- Date of birth: 25 September 1968 (age 58)
- Place of birth: Redhill, England
- Position: Right back

Youth career
- ?–1985: Chelsea

Senior career*
Years	Team	Apps	(Gls)
1985	Hendon	?	(?)
1985–1988	Whyteleafe	?	(?)
1988–1989	College of Boca Raton	?	(?)
1989	Croydon	?	(?)
1989–1991	Fisher Athletic	50	(4)
1991–1992	Barnet	6	(0)
1991–1992	→ Redbridge Forest (loan)	22	(2)
1992–1994	Dagenham & Redbridge	71	(12)
1994–1996	Enfield	?	(?)
1996–1997	Slough Town	35	(3)
1997–1998	Brisbane Strikers	12	(0)
1998–1999	Dagenham & Redbridge	?	(?)
1999–2002	Margate	?	(?)
2002	Croydon	?	(?)
- * Club domestic league appearances and goals

Gary John Blackford (born 25 September 1968) is an English former professional footballer who played in the Football League as a defender for Barnet.
