= Saig bei Lenzkirch =

Coordinates: 47.8926°N 8.1786°E

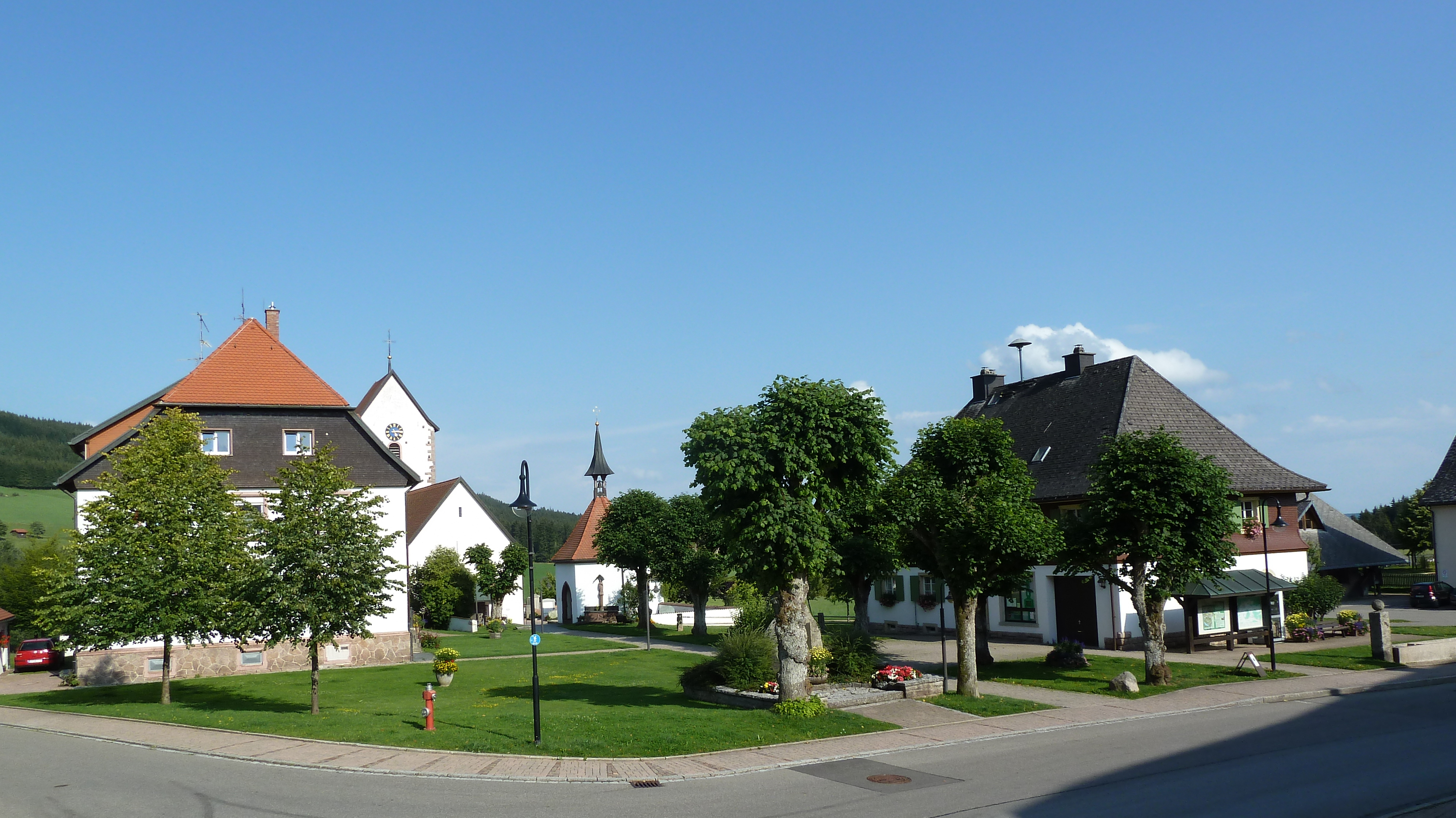

Saig bei Lenzkirch is a small village and health resort with therapeutical climate in the community of Lenzkirch, district of Breisgau-Hochschwarzwald in the German state of Baden-Württemberg. It has a surface area of 11,03 km^{2} and a resident population of 1023, 777 in the urban area (as of 31 December 2014). Saig derives its name from Seigge, a German word for watershed as it lays in the divide between the Rhine and the Danube.
