= Fulvio Cimino =

Swiss footballer (born 1968)

Personal information
- Date of birth: 6 July 1968 (age 58)
- Position: Midfielder

Senior career*
Years	Team	Apps	(Gls)
- FC St. Gallen
- FC Wil 1900
- FC Vaduz
- * Club domestic league appearances and goals

Fulvio Cimino (born 6 August 1968) is a retired Swiss football midfielder.
