= Gennaro Monaco =

Italian footballer and manager

Personal information
- Date of birth: January 5, 1968 (age 58)
- Place of birth: Naples, Italy
- Height: 1.85 m (6 ft 1 in)
- Position: Centre back

Youth career
- Napoli

Senior career*
Years	Team	Apps	(Gls)
1986–1988	Ischia	66	(3)
1988–1990	Empoli	52	(0)
1990–1993	Casertana	82	(1)
1993–1996	Ischia	71	(0)
1996–1998	Juve Stabia	65	(2)
1998–1999	Catania	29	(2)
1999–2001	Acireale	37	(0)
2001–2004	Catania	20	(0)
2004–2005	Acireale	0	(0)
2005	Taranto	7	(0)
2005	Ferentino	22	(0)
2006–2009	Quarto	25	(1)
Total		476	(9)

Managerial career
- 2009–2010: Pianura (Youth)
- 2011–2012: Palmese
- * Club domestic league appearances and goals

Gennaro Monaco (born January 5, 1968) is an Italian association football: he is former manager of Palmese and former player.

== Career ==
=== Playing career ===
Monaco began to play football in his city, within the Napoli youth team. On the season 1986-1987 the chairman of Ischia, Roberto Fiore, bought him at the age of 18. With 34 appearances and 3 goals is one of the main contributors to the second place on the table and the promotion, first time for the club, in Serie C1. Two season later he went to play in Serie B for Empoli, that was just relegated from Serie A. In Tuscany didn't go well and the team lost the final match against Brescia on penalties and was relegated to Serie C1. On the season 1990-1991 he moved to Casertana, the team won the Serie C1 but the year later they were relegated. He played 136 games between 1993 and 1998 in Serie C1 for Ischia and Juve Stabia before he joined Catania in Serie C2, where he was named captain, won the league at the end of the season. After one and half year with Acireale, he came back to Catania in Serie C1 then Serie B. He started the game at Stadio San Paolo for the first time against his Napoli under the manager Toshack.

=== Coaching career ===
After having retired as a footballer, Monaco worked as a manager for the youth team of Pianura.

On the season 2011-2012 he has been manager of Palmese in Eccellenza Campania.

== Honours ==
=== Player ===
Casertana

- Serie C1 (1): 1990-1991

Catania

- Serie C2 (1): 1998-1999
