= Dragan Reljić =

Croatian footballer (born 1968)

Personal information
- Date of birth: 30 January 1968 (age 58)
- Place of birth: SFR Yugoslavia
- Position: Forward

Senior career*
Years	Team	Apps	(Gls)
1984–1985	Bagat Zadar	26	(28)
1985–1989	Hajduk Split	4	(0)
1989–1990	Spartak Subotica	22	(3)
1992–1996	SG Egelsbach	105	(17)
1996–1997	Viktoria Aschaffenburg		
1997–1998	Darmstadt 98	21	(2)
- * Club domestic league appearances and goals

Dragan Reljić (born 30 January 1968) is a Croatian former professional footballer who played for clubs in former Yugoslavia and for lower league German clubs.

== Career ==
In the 1984–85 season, being only 17 years old, while playing for the first team of NK Bagat Zadar, Reljić won "Dalmatian golden boot" award which earned him a contract with Hajduk but over the course of next four seasons he played only few official matches. Later he moved to Subotica and Germany where he finished his career.
