= Franco Massimo =

English footballer

Personal information
- Full name: Franco Massimo
- Date of birth: 23 September 1968 (age 58)
- Place of birth: Horsham, England
- Position: Forward

Youth career
- 1985–1986: Brighton & Hove Albion

Senior career*
Years	Team	Apps	(Gls)
1986–1987	Brighton & Hove Albion	1	(0)
1987–1988	Southwick		
1988	Crawley Town	4	(1)
- Worthing
- Horsham
- Dorking
- Three Bridges
- Steyning Town
1990–1991	Horsham YMCA		
- Storrington
- * Club domestic league appearances and goals

Franco Massimo (born 23 September 1968) is an English former professional footballer who played as a forward in the Football League for Brighton & Hove Albion.

== Club career ==
Massimo started his career as an apprentice at Brighton & Hove Albion and made his first team debut in April 1986 as a substitute in a 2–0 defeat to Shrewsbury Town. He only made one more substitute appearance for the first team during the 1986–87 season before he was released. He had a short spell at Southern League Premier Division side Crawley Town in the 1987–88 season, making eight appearances in all competitions and scoring four goals. He later played for a host of non-league clubs.

After retiring from professional football he later became a police officer.
