= István Varga (footballer, born 1963) =

Hungarian footballer

Personal information
- Date of birth: 1 January 1963
- Place of birth: Budapest, Hungary
- Position: Midfielder

Youth career
- 1975–1977: KSI
- 1977–1982: MTK-VM

Senior career*
Years	Team	Apps	(Gls)
1982–1988	MTK Budapest	113	(11)
1988–1989	Budapest Honvéd	21	(1)
1989–1991	K.S.V. Waregem		
1991–1997	SR Délemont		

International career
1987–1990	Hungary	8	(0)
- * Club domestic league appearances and goals

István Varga (born 1 January 1963) was a Hungarian professional footballer who played as a midfielder. He was a member of the Hungary national team.

== Career ==
Varga started playing football for KSI in 1975. From 1977 he played for MTK Budapest, where he made his debut in the top flight in 1982. He was a member of the 1986–87 championship-winning team. In 1988 he moved to Budapest Honvéd, where he won the championship and the Hungarian Cup with the team. He then moved to Belgium, where he played for K.S.V. Waregem.

Between 1987 and 1990 he played eight times for the Hungary national team.

== Honours ==
Budapest Honvéd

- Nemzeti Bajnokság I: 1986–87

MTK Budapest

- Nemzeti Bajnokság I: 1988–89
- Magyar Kupa: 1989
