= Thijs Waterink =

Dutch footballer

Personal information
- Date of birth: 26 December 1968 (age 57)
- Place of birth: Arnhem, Netherlands
- Height: 1.90 m (6 ft 3 in)
- Positions: Libero; forward

Senior career*
Years	Team	Apps	(Gls)
1988–1989	FC Wageningen		
1989–1991	De Treffers		
1991–1996	TOP Oss		
1996–1998	Den Bosch	60	(24)
1998–1999	FC Gütersloh	28	(3)
1999–2000	Arminia Bielefeld	21	(0)
2000–2003	Karlsruher SC	90	(3)
2003–2005	SC Paderborn	51	(6)
2005–2009	De Bataven		
- * Club domestic league appearances and goals

Thijs Waterink (born 26 December 1968) is a Dutch former professional footballer who played as a libero and forward for FC Wageningen, TOP Oss, FC Den Bosch, FC Gütersloh, Arminia Bielefeld, Karlsruher SC, and SC Paderborn 07.

In 2005, he received a four-month suspension by de German Football Association for his role in the bribe scandal with referee Robert Hoyzer and his club SC Paderborn fired him. After his suspension he played until 2008 at Dutch hoofdklasse amateur club De Bataven in Gendt.
