= Adrian Jenzer =

Swiss footballer (born 1967)

Personal information
- Full name: Adrian Jenzer
- Date of birth: 5 March 1967 (age 59)
- Height: 1.82 m (6 ft 0 in)
- Position: Midfielder

Senior career*
Years	Team	Apps	(Gls)
until 1991	Rapid Ostermundigen		
1991–1993	FC Basel	29	(4)
- * Club domestic league appearances and goals

Adrian Jenzer (born 5 March 1967) is a Swiss former footballer who played in the 1990s. He played as midfielder.

== Football career ==
Jenzer played for local amateur club Rapid Ostermundigen and then joined FC Basel's first team for their 1991–92 season under head coach Ernst August Künnecke. After playing in five test games Jenzer played his domestic league debut for his new club in the home game in the St. Jakob Stadium on 24 July 1991 as Basel played a 1–1 draw with Yverdon-Sports. He scored his first goal for the club on 15 October in the home game in the St. Jakob Stadium against Urania Genève Sport as Basel won 3–1.

Jenzer stayed with the club for two season. Between the years 1991 and 1993 Jenzer played a total of 44 games for Basel scoring a total of 8 goals. 29 of these games were in the Nationalliga A, 5 in the Swiss Cup and 10 were friendly games. He scored 4 goals in the domestic league, the other 4 were scored during the test games.

== Sources ==
- Rotblau: Jahrbuch Saison 2017/2018. Publisher: FC Basel Marketing AG. ISBN 978-3-7245-2189-1
- Die ersten 125 Jahre. Publisher: Josef Zindel im Friedrich Reinhardt Verlag, Basel. ISBN 978-3-7245-2305-5
- Verein "Basler Fussballarchiv" Homepage
