= Gilles Petrucci =

French footballer (born 1968)

Personal information
- Date of birth: 4 December 1968 (age 57)
- Place of birth: Martigues
- Position: Defender

Senior career*
Years	Team	Apps	(Gls)
1986–1997	FC Martigues		
1997–1999	FC Istres		
- * Club domestic league appearances and goals

Gilles Petrucci (born 4 December 1968) is a retired French football defender.
