= Darren Newman =

English footballer

Personal information
- Full name: Darren Lewis Newman
- Date of birth: 14 August 1968 (age 58)
- Place of birth: Brighton, England
- Position: Defender

Youth career
- 1984–1986: Brighton & Hove Albion

Senior career*
Years	Team	Apps	(Gls)
1985–1986	Brighton & Hove Albion	1	(0)
- Southwick
- Peacehaven & Telscombe
- Newhaven
- Ringmer
- Burgess Hill Town
- * Club domestic league appearances and goals

Darren Lewis Newman (born 14 August 1968) is an English former professional footballer who played as a defender in the Football League for Brighton & Hove Albion.

== Club career ==
Newman started his career as an apprentice at Brighton & Hove Albion and after appearing as an unused substitute a number of times, he made his first team debut on 12 April 1986 in a 2–0 defeat to Shrewsbury Town.
