= Rezső Kékesi =

Hungarian footballer

Personal information
- Date of birth: 11 January 1958 (age 68)
- Place of birth: Budapest, Hungary
- Position: Midfielder

Youth career
- ?–1972: Ferencvárosi Vasutas
- 1972–1977: Ferencvárosi TC

Senior career*
Years	Team	Apps	(Gls)
1975–1977	Ferencvárosi TC	0	(0)
1977–1978	Dorogi FC	31	(0)
1978–1984	Volán	89	(6)
1984–1989	MTK Budapest FC	142	(12)
1990–1993	Yverdon-Sport FC	14	(0)

International career
1987–1988	Hungary	3	(0)
- * Club domestic league appearances and goals

Rezső Kékesi (born 11 January 1958) is a former Hungarian professional footballer who played as a midfielder. He was a member of the Hungary national team. He finished his playing career in Switzerland, where he still lives with his family.

== Career ==
He started his football career in the Ferencváros Vasutas team. From there he moved to Ferencvárosi TC, where he played until 1977. He played in three home matches. In 1977-78 he played for Dorogi FC, between 1978 and 1984 for Volán. He made his debut in the top flight in 1979. From 1984 to 1989 he played for MTK Budapest FC. He won one gold, one silver and one bronze medal each with the MTK Budapest FC. In February 1990, he joined Yverdon-Sport FC of Switzerland. In the Hungarian top flight, he played 231 matches between 1979 and 1989, scoring 18 goals.

=== National team ===
Between 1987 and 1988 he played three times for the national team.

== Honours ==
- Nemzeti Bajnokság I (NB I)
  - Champion: 1986-87
