= Raphaël Comisetti =

Swiss footballer (born 1971)

Personal information
- Date of birth: 12 October 1971 (age 55)
- Position: Midfielder

Senior career*
Years	Team	Apps	(Gls)
1990–1991	FC Malley		
1991–1992	Yverdon Sport FC		
1992–1996	FC Lausanne-Sport		
1996–1997	Yverdon Sport FC		

International career
- Switzerland u-21
- * Club domestic league appearances and goals

Raphaël Comisetti (born 12 October 1971) is a retired Swiss football midfielder.
