= Robert Kok =

Dutch footballer (born 1957)

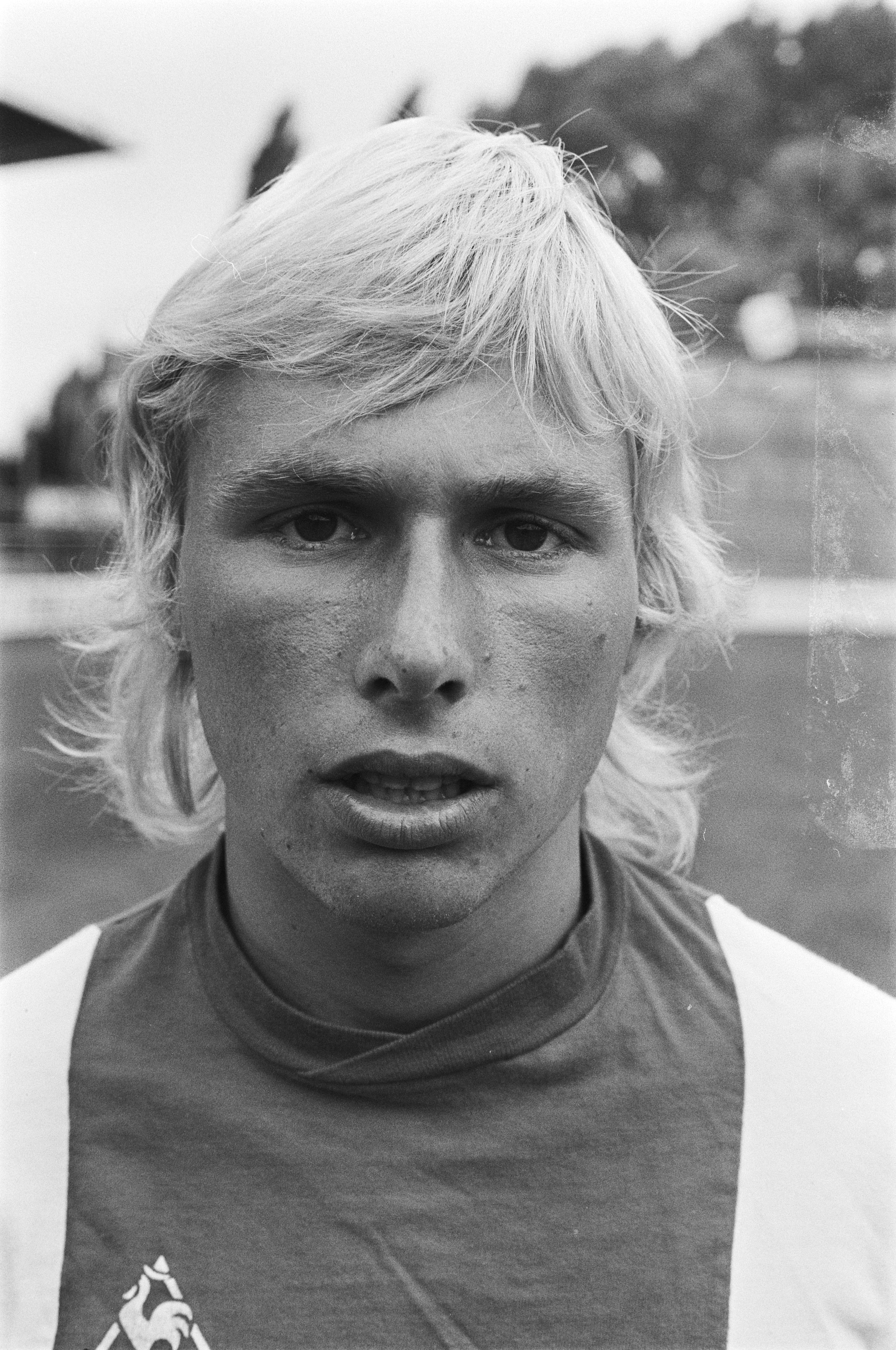
- Kok with Ajax in 1976

Personal information
- Full name: Robert Christiaan Kok
- Date of birth: 26 June 1957 (age 69)
- Place of birth: Amsterdam, Netherlands
- Height: 1.75 m (5 ft 9 in)
- Position: Striker

Youth career
- 1967–1977: Ajax Amsterdam

Senior career*
Years	Team	Apps	(Gls)
1974–1977	Ajax Reserves	92	(49)
1977–1978	K. Boom	31	(6)
1978–1979	Lierse	20	(3)
1979–1984	Lausanne-Sport	126	(45)
1984–1988	Servette	93	(24)
1988–1991	FC Zürich	74	(23)
1991–1992	FC Basel	13	(1)
Total		449	(151)

International career
1974–1977	Netherlands B	19	(5)
- * Club domestic league appearances and goals

Robert Christiaan Kok (born 26 June 1957) is a Dutch former footballer who played as striker for AFC AJAX Amsterdam in the Netherlands, clubs in Belgium and clubs in Switzerland from the late 1970s until the early 1990s.

== Early life and career ==
Robert Christiaan Kok was born on 26 June 1957 in Amsterdam. He began his career with AJAX Amsterdam, playing for the Dutch club from 1967 until 1977. He then moved to K. Boom F.C. in Belgium and played there until 1978, when he signed for Lierse S.K. The following season, he moved to Switzerland with FC Lausanne-Sport where he stayed until signing for Servette FC in 1984. In 1988, FC Zürich acquired his services.

Kok joined Basel during the winter break of their 1991–92 season under head coach Ernst August Künnecke. After playing in three test games Epars played his domestic league debut for his new club in the home game in the St. Jakob Stadium on 1 March 1992 as Basel played a 1–1 draw with Yverdon-Sports. He scored his first goal for the club on 4 April in the home game as Basel played a 3–3 draw with Baden.

Kok stayed with the club until the end of the season, after which he ended his professional career. During this time he played a total of 19 games for Basel scoring a total of two goals. 13 of these games were in the Nationalliga B,

three in the Swiss Cup and three were friendly games. He scored one goal in the domestic league, the other was scored during the test games.

== Honours ==
=== Club ===
Lausanne-Sport

- Swiss Cup: 1980–81

Servette

- Swiss Super League: 1984–85

=== Individual ===
- Swiss Foreign Footballer of the Year: 1980–81
