= José Sinval =

Brazilian footballer and manager

Personal information
- Full name: José Sinval de Campos
- Date of birth: 6 April 1967 (age 59)
- Place of birth: Bebedouro, Brazil
- Height: 1.71 m (5 ft 7 in)
- Position: Striker

Team information
- Current team: FC Sion (assistant manager)

Senior career*
Years	Team	Apps	(Gls)
1985–1986	Ponte Preta		
1986–1995	Servette	272	(45)
1995–2000	Mérida		
2000	Pachuca		
2001–2003	Étoile Carouge		
2004–2004	Collex-Bossy		
2005–2006	Mérida		
2006–2007	Fribourg		

Managerial career
- 2014: Servette (assistant)
- 2017–: Sion (assistant)
- * Club domestic league appearances and goals

José Sinval de Campos (born 6 April 1967), known as José Sinval or Sinval, is a Brazilian football striker who mainly played in Switzerland and Spain. He settled in Switzerland and became a coach.

Sinval began his career in Ponte Preta, but was scouted during a youth tournament in Qatar. He moved to Switzerland as a part of a "Brazilian invasion" of the country's football scene. He joined Servette FC in 1986. Aged only 19, he still managed to take the place of French international Bernard Genghini.

After winning the 1993–94 Nationalliga A with Servette, he dreamt of a transfer to Serie A. This did not happen, but in 1995 he left Swiss football to join CP Mérida. He faced relegation from the 1995–96 La Liga, but helped win the 1996–97 Segunda División, only to be relegated once more from the 1997–98 La Liga. El Periódico Extremadura called him "one of the most charismatic players in the club's history".

Following a spell with Pachuca in Mexico, he returned to Switzerland in an attempt to rejoin Servette. He was not wanted by Servette at the time, and a trial with FC Wil and talks with Racing Ferrol did not come to fruition, with Sinval ultimately being signed by Étoile Carouge in the Swiss second tier. In 2005, though past his prime, he moved back to Mérida and the club Mérida UD. The transfer was orchestrated by the club president, whose father had been president in the 1990s. The club contested the 2005–06 Segunda División B, and his playing was contingent on obtaining an Italian passport.

== Personal life ==
Sinval married for the second time in 2022. He considered himself Swiss after residing there for several decades, but had not acquired a Swiss passport.

== Honours ==
Servette

- 1993–94 Nationalliga A

Mérida

- 1996–97 Segunda División
