= Mathias Walther =

Swiss footballer and manager (born 1972)

Personal information
- Date of birth: 11 April 1972 (age 54)
- Place of birth: Basel, Switzerland
- Position: Midfielder

Youth career
- FC Basel

Senior career*
Years	Team	Apps	(Gls)
1990–1993	FC Basel	13	(0)

Managerial career
- 2004–2009: FC Winterthur
- 2018: Grasshopper Club
- * Club domestic league appearances and goals

Mathias Walther (born 11 April 1972) is a retired Swiss football midfielder and later manager. He was sporting director of Grasshopper Club until 2019 and is now businessman and entrepreneur.

Walther came through the youth system of FC Basel and advanced to their U-21 team 1990. He was called up to their first team many times in their 1990–91 season under head coach Ernst August Künnecke. He played his domestic league debut for the club in the home game in the St. Jakob Stadium on 22 December 1990 as Basel won 6–2 against Schaffhausen. In that season he played just three league matches. In the following season he joined the first team squad and had ten appearances.

At the age of 21 Walther had to end his active career because of performance asthma. During his three seasons with the team Walther played a total of 22 games for Basel scoring one goal. 13 of these games were in the Nationalliga A, 2 in the Swiss Cup and 7 were friendly games. He scored his goal during his last test game for the club.

Walther completed a degree in business administration. He joined Grasshopper Club in 1998 as academy manager and coach of their U-14 team. In 2004 he became Director of Football and head coach by FC Winterthur in the second tier of Swiss football and held these positions until 2009. Walther rejoined GC in 2010 and became coach of their U-21 team for the 2010–11 season. Walther worked for the club as sport director and academy manager. On 10 April 2018 he sacked head coach Murat Yakin and took over as caretaker manager himself for a short period. Since 2013 he has also been a member of the board of directors of the sports marketing company Codama AG.
