= Thomas Schweizer =

German footballer (born 1967)

Personal information
- Date of birth: 13 September 1967 (age 59)
- Place of birth: Freiburg im Breisgau, Germany
- Height: 1.83 m (6 ft 0 in)
- Positions: Striker; midfielder

Senior career*
| Years | Team | Apps | (Gls) |
| 1986–1991 | SC Freiburg | 135 | (30) |
| 1991–1992 | FC Basel | 34 | (4) |
| 1992–1993 | SC Freiburg | 1 | (0) |
| 1992–1993 | → Chemnitzer FC (loan) | 17 | (2) |
| 1993–1994 | Freiburger FC | 34 | (7) |
| 1996–1998 | SV Kappel | | |
| 1998–1999 | Bahlinger SC | | |
| 1999–2000 | SV Kirchzarten | | |
| 2000–2002 | Freiburger FC | | |
- * Club domestic league appearances and goals

Thomas Schweizer (born 13 September 1967) is a German former professional footballer who played from the late 1980s until the early 2000s. He played mainly in the position of striker, but also as midfielder.

== Career ==
Schweizer played his youth football with SC Freiburg and in 1996 he advanced to their first team. He played for them for five seasons in the 2. Bundesliga.

Schweizer joined FC Basel for their 1991–92 season under head coach Ernst August Künnecke. After playing in seven test games Schweizer played his domestic league debut for his new club in the home game in the St. Jakob Stadium on 24 July 1991 as Basel played a 1–1 with Yverdon-Sports. He scored his first goal for them in the same match.

He stayed with the club just this one season and during this time Schweizer played a total of 52 games for Basel scoring a total of nine goals. 34 of these games were in the Nationalliga A, four in the Swiss Cup and 14 were friendly games. He scored four goals in the domestic league, two in the cup and the other three were scored during the test games.

Following his time with Basel, Thomas Schweizer returned to his club of origin SC Freiburg, but he played only one game with them, before being loaned out to Chemnitzer FC for the rest of the 1992–93 2. Bundesliga season. After this season he transferred to Freiburger FC and played a number of seasons with other non-league clubs before ending his active football career in 2002.

== Sources ==
- Rotblau: Jahrbuch Saison 2017–2018. Publisher: FC Basel Marketing AG. ISBN 978-3-7245-2189-1
- Die ersten 125 Jahre. Publisher: Josef Zindel im Friedrich Reinhardt Verlag, Basel. ISBN 978-3-7245-2305-5
- Verein "Basler Fussballarchiv" Homepage
