= Robert Alleyne =

English footballer (born 1968)

Personal information
- Full name: Robert Anthony Alleyne
- Date of birth: 27 September 1968 (age 58)
- Place of birth: Dudley, Staffordshire, England
- Height: 5 ft 9 in (1.75 m)
- Position: Forward

Youth career
- Leicester City

Senior career*
Years	Team	Apps	(Gls)
1987–1988	Leicester City	3	(0)
1987–1988	→ Wrexham (loan)	10	(2)
1988–1989	Chesterfield	40	(5)
- Telford United
- * Club domestic league appearances and goals

Robert Anthony Alleyne (born 27 September 1968) is an English former professional footballer, who played as a forward. He made over 50 total appearances in the English Football League in the 1980s, playing for Leicester City, Wrexham and Chesterfield.

He also played for Telford United at non-league level.
