= Micha Rahmen =

Swiss footballer (born 1971)

Personal information
- Full name: Michel Rahmen
- Date of birth: 1 February 1971 (age 55)
- Positions: Defender; midfielder

Youth career
- until 1989: FC Concordia Basel

Senior career*
Years	Team	Apps	(Gls)
1989–1990	FC Concordia Basel		
1990–1991	Grasshopper Club	14	(0)
1991–1994	FC Basel	40	(5)
1994–1997	FC Riehen		
1997–1999	SV Muttenz		
1999–2002	FC Concordia Basel		
- * Club domestic league appearances and goals

Micha Rahmen (born 1 February 1971), son to Bruno Rahmen, is a retired Swiss footballer, who played either as defender or midfielder.

== Football career ==
Born in Basel Rahmen played his youth football with local club FC Concordia Basel and advanced to their first team in 1989. He signed his first professional contract with Grasshopper Club for the 1990–91 Nationalliga A season. Rahmen won the Nationalliga A championship that season, but the club did not prolong Rahmens contract and so he moved on.

Rahmen joined FC Basel's first team during their 1991–92 season under head-coach Ernst-August Künnecke. After playing in seven test games Rahmen played his domestic league debut for his new club in the home game in the St. Jakob Stadium on 24 July 1991 as Basel played a 1–1 draw with Yverdon-Sports. He scored his first goal for his club in the home game on 10 August. It was the first goal of the match, scored in the 1st minute of the game as Basel won 2–1 against Etoile Carouge.

During Basel's 1993–94 season his team mates were the likes of Swiss international goalkeeper Stefan Huber, defenders Massimo Ceccaroni, Marco Walker, Reto Baumgartner and Samir Tabakovic, the midfielders Mario Cantaluppi, Martin Jeitziner, Admir Smajić and Ørjan Berg and the Swiss international striker Dario Zuffi. Together they won the promotion/relegation group and thus won promotion to the top flight of Swiss football, after six seasons in the second tier.

After this successful season, Rahmen retired from professional football and left the club. During his time with Basel, between the years 1991 and 1994 Rahmen played a total of 77 games for Basel scoring a total of 14 goals. 40 of these games were in the Nationalliga B, ten in the Swiss Cup and 27 were friendly games. He scored five goals in the domestic league, four in the cup and the other five were scored during the test games.

Following his time with Basel, Rahmen played three seasons as amateur for local club FC Riehen in the third tier of Swiss football and two season for SV Muttenz who played at the same level. In 1990 he then returned to his club of origin FC Concordia Basel who also played in the 1st League. In his second season with the club, they won the 1st League Group 2 and qualified for the promotion play-offs. In the first round they beat FC Schötz 3–1 on aggregate and in the finals they beat Vaduz 1–0 and with the draw against FC Serrières they were promoted as 1st League champions. Rahmen played with the club for their Nationalliga B 2001–02 season and then he retired from his active football career.

== Family ==
Micha's father is Bruno Rahmen, who was also a former Swiss football player and five time winner of the Swiss League Championship. Later Bruno Rahmen worked as football manager. Micha's brother is Patrick Rahmen, who was also a professional footballer, is now football trainer and coach. Since 2020 he is assistant coach to Ciriaco Sforza at FC Basel.

== Sources ==
- Die ersten 125 Jahre. Publisher: Josef Zindel im Friedrich Reinhardt Verlag, Basel. ISBN 978-3-7245-2305-5
- Verein "Basler Fussballarchiv" Homepage
