= Chris Grocock =

English lawyer and footballer

Personal information
- Full name: Christopher Richard Grocock
- Date of birth: 30 October 1968 (age 58)
- Place of birth: Grimsby, England
- Position: Left winger

Youth career
- Grimsby Town

Senior career*
Years	Team	Apps	(Gls)
1987–1989	Grimsby Town	43	(1)
- Boston United
- Grantham Town
- Bridlington Town
- Boston Town
- Brigg Town
- Louth United
- * Club domestic league appearances and goals

Christopher Richard Grocock (born 30 October 1968) is an English lawyer and former professional footballer.

== Career ==
Born in Grimsby, Grocock played as a left winger for Grimsby Town, Boston United, Grantham Town, Bridlington Town, Boston Town, Brigg Town and Louth United.

After retiring as a player he became a solicitor.
