= Martin Filson =

English footballer

Personal information
- Full name: Robert Martin Filson
- Date of birth: 25 June 1968 (age 58)
- Place of birth: St Helens, England
- Position: Defender

Youth career
- –1986: Everton

Senior career*
Years	Team	Apps	(Gls)
1986–1987	Everton	0	(0)
1987–1988	Preston North End		
1989–1990	Wrexham	2	(0)
- Rhyl
- Bath City
- Stalybridge Celtic
- Halifax Town
- Dagenham & Redbridge
- Caernarfon Town
- Leek Town
- Boston United
- Bangor City
- Northwich Victoria
- Droylsden
2001–2002	Hyde United	9	(3)
- * Club domestic league appearances and goals

Robert Martin Filson (born 25 June 1968) is an English former professional footballer who played as a defender. He made appearances in the English Football League for Wrexham.
