= Alejandro Grandi =

Uruguayan footballer (born 1968)

Personal information
- Full name: Alejandro Sergio Grandi Mathon
- Date of birth: 22 August 1968 (age 58)
- Place of birth: Montevideo, Uruguay
- Height: 1.78 m (5 ft 10 in)
- Position: Goalkeeper

Senior career*
Years	Team	Apps	(Gls)
1987–1992	Bella Vista	80	(0)
1993	Huracán	14	(0)
1994–1995	Nacional	12	(0)
1996	Huracán Buceo		
1997	Montevideo Wanderers		
1997	Olimpia		
1998	Cádiz CF	8	(0)
1999	Montevideo Wanderers		
2000	River Plate (URU)		
2001	Montevideo Wanderers		
2002–2003	Liverpool (URU)		
- * Club domestic league appearances and goals

Alejandro Sergio Grandi Mathon (born 22 August 1968) is an Uruguayan retired footballer who played for a number of clubs including Cádiz CF and Liverpool (URU). He played for Club Atlético Huracán in the Argentine Primera during the Clausura 1993 tournament.
