= Stephan Beckenbauer =

German footballer (1968–2015)

Personal information
- Date of birth: 1 December 1968
- Place of birth: Munich, West Germany
- Date of death: 31 July 2015 (aged 46)
- Place of death: Munich, Germany
- Height: 1.88 m (6 ft 2 in)
- Position: Centre-back

Youth career
- Bayern Munich

Senior career*
Years	Team	Apps	(Gls)
1986–1988	Bayern Munich II		
1988–1990	1860 Munich	31	(1)
1990–1991	Kickers Offenbach		
1991–1992	FC Grenchen		
1992–1994	1. FC Saarbrücken	24	(1)
1994–1997	Bayern Munich II	22	(0)

Managerial career
- 1998–2015: Bayern Munich (youth)
- * Club domestic league appearances and goals

Stephan Beckenbauer (1 December 1968 – 31 July 2015) was a German footballer who played as a centre-back.

== Career ==
Born in Munich, Beckenbauer began playing with local FC Bayern, but never moved past the reserve team during his two-year tenure. He spent the vast majority of his 11-year senior career in the lower leagues, also representing TSV 1860 München, Kickers Offenbach and FC Grenchen.

Beckenbauer's input at the professional level consisted of 12 games in both the Bundesliga and the 2. Bundesliga with 1. FC Saarbrücken, for which he signed in the summer of 1992. He made his debut in the former competition on 14 August 1992 by coming on as a 79th-minute substitute in a 1–1 away draw against Bayer Leverkusen, as the season ended in relegation after an 18th-place finish.

In 1990, Beckenbauer had a trial with Red Star Belgrade, but did not sign. He retired in 1997 at only 28, returning immediately to Bayern and going on to work with the club as a scout and youth coach.

== Personal life ==
Beckenbauer's father, Franz, was also a footballer. He represented Bayern and the West German national team and later managed both, winning a World Cup title both as player (1974) and manager (1990). His son Luca is also a former professional footballer, playing in the Regionalliga for Hannover 96 II, SV Heimstetten, Rot-Weiß Koblenz, Greuther Fürth II and Wacker Burghausen.

== Death ==
Beckenbauer died of a brain tumor. He was 46.
