= Maximilian Heidenreich =

German footballer (1967–2024)

Personal information
- Date of birth: 9 May 1967
- Place of birth: Hanover, Lower Saxony, West Germany
- Date of death: 6 November 2024 (aged 57)
- Place of death: Waldkirch, Baden-Württemberg, Germany
- Height: 1.73 m (5 ft 8 in)
- Positions: Libero; midfielder

Senior career*
| Years | Team | Apps | (Gls) |
| 1984–1987 | Hannover 96 | 97 | (6) |
| 1987–1988 | 1860 Munich | 13 | (1) |
| 1988–1989 | Eintracht Frankfurt | 13 | (0) |
| 1989–1990 | Hannover 96 | 11 | (0) |
| 1990–1992 | FC Basel | 56 | (6) |
| 1992–1997 | SC Freiburg | 160 | (11) |
| 1997–1998 | VfL Wolfsburg | 10 | (0) |
| 1998–1999 | SG Wattenscheid 09 | | |

Managerial career
- 2001–2008: Freiburger FC
- 2009–2011: SV Weil
- 2011–2014: FC Denzlingen
- 2015–2017: SV Weil
- * Club domestic league appearances and goals

Maximilian Heidenreich (9 May 1967 – 6 November 2024) was a German football player and manager. A libero and midfielder, he played for various clubs in Germany and Switzerland during the 1980s and 1990s. He died from bowel cancer on 6 November 2024, at the age of 57.

== Football career ==
Heidenreich played his early youth football with Arminia Hannover and in 1982 he moved to Hannover 96, spending two years in their youth department before advancing to their first team, who at that time played in the 2. Bundesliga. Heidenreich immediately became a regular player and at the end of the season the team were joint leaders of the division and achieved promotion. Despite immediate relegation he remained with the club for another season. Heidenreich then played one season for 1860 Munich in the Bayernliga and one season for Eintracht Frankfurt in the Bundesliga, before he returned to Hannover 96 in 1989.

In July 1990 Heidenreich moved to Switzerland and joined Basel's first team under head coach Ernst August Künnecke for their 1990–91 season. After playing in five test games, Heidenreich played his domestic league debut for the club in the away game at the Stadion Kleinfeld on 25 July as Basel won 3–0 against SC Kriens. He scored his first goal for his new team on 18 November, as Basel played a 2–2 draw, in the away game against Chiasso. As a midfielder, Heidenreich strengthened the FCB team and he repeatedly stood out with his technical skills and his overview of the game. During his time in Basel, Heidenreich played 59 competitive matches for Basel, including three Swiss Cup matches, but was denied promotion at the time. He scored seven goals, six in the league and one in the cup.

He achieved this promotion with his next club, SC Freiburg, to which he moved in the summer of 1992. It was then that he celebrated his greatest successes with the Breisgau-Brasilianer. As a regular player in Volker Finke's team, he contributed greatly to Freiburg's first ever promotion to the Bundesliga in 1993 and their first European participation in the 1995–96 UEFA Cup.

Heidenreich spent the last two years of his professional career at VfL Wolfsburg and SG Wattenscheid 09 before returning to the southwest of Germany. He worked as a coach at several clubs, including SV Weil for two years from March 2015.
