= Christian Marcolli =

Swiss football player and psychologist (born 1973)

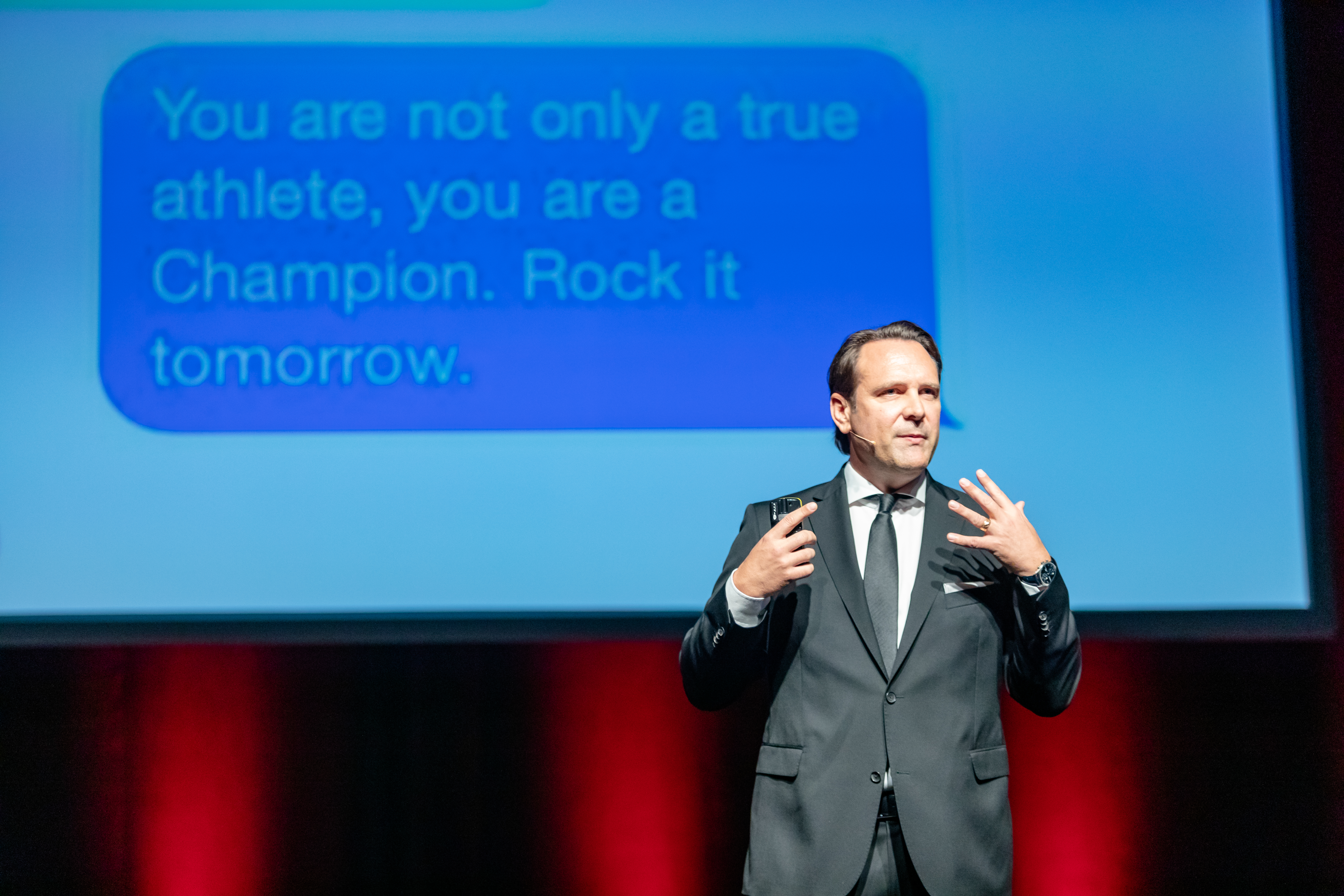
- Marcolli during a keynote in New York City

Personal information
- Full name: Christian Marcolli
- Date of birth: 14 March 1973 (age 53)
- Place of birth: Basel, Switzerland
- Positions: Midfielder; striker

Youth career
- until 1989: FC Aesch

Senior career*
Years	Team	Apps	(Gls)
1989–1990	FC Aesch		
1990–1993	FC Basel	46	(11)
1993–1994	BSC Old Boys	34	(13)
1994–1995	SR Delémont	12	(4)

International career
- Swiss National Teams under 15-21
- * Club domestic league appearances and goals

Christian Marcolli (born 14 March 1973) is a Swiss performance psychologist, executive coach and leadership team consultant, author, and speaker. He is a former professional footballer who played as a striker or midfielder.

== Biography ==
=== Football career ===
Marcolli played his youth football with local club FC Aesch. He advanced to their first team in the 1989–1990 season and received a number of call-ups to the Swiss national teams under 15 to under 21.

After having rejected an offer from the then Swiss Champion Grasshopper Club Zürich, he joined FC Basel's first team during the winter break of their 1990–91 season and signed his first professional contract under head-coach Ernst August Künnecke in the second tier of Swiss football. After playing in four test games, Marcolli played his domestic league debut for his new club in the home game in the St. Jakob Stadium on 3 March 1990 as Basel won 3–1 against Etoile Carouge. He scored his first league goal for his club in the home game on 13 April as Basel were defeated 1–4 by Baden.

Marcolli stayed with the club for two and a half seasons. During this time he played a total of 65 games for Basel scoring a total of 16 goals. 40 of these games were in the Nationalliga A, six in the Swiss Cup and 19 were friendly games. He scored five goals in the domestic league, six in the cup and the other eight were scored during the test games.

Following his time with FC Basel, Marcolli played two seasons on loan with BSC Old Boys and SR Delémont. In 4.5 years of professional football, he played in nearly 100 professional games, scored 30 goals across league and cup competitions, and earned several caps for the under-21 national team. But severe knee injuries forced him to retire early from professional sports.

=== Professional Career ===
Marcolli then studied psychology at the University of Basel, Switzerland as well as sport and performance psychology at the University of Ottawa, Canada. He earned his PhD in Applied psychology from the University of Zurich, Switzerland in 2001.

He is the founder and CEO of Marcolli Executive Excellence, a boutique style consulting company specialized in high performance for executives and leadership teams of blue chip companies. In parallel he works as a performance coach with top athletes, having collaborated with Roger Federer, Yann Sommer. Dominique Gisin, Michelle Gisin, and Manuel Akanji.

== Books ==
- Marcolli, Christian (2025): WINNING MATCH: Leadership for Game Changers - Together Toward the Extraordinary. ISBN 978-1-969679-04-9
- Marcolli, Christian (2023): Spotlight on Performance. Executive Inspiration - Volume II. ISBN 978-3-909191-70-3
- Gisin, Michelle, Christian Marcolli, and Dominique Gisin (2019): A True Athlete. ISBN 3-909191-74-6
- Marcolli, Christian (2018): Spotlight on Performance. Executive Inspiration. ISBN 978-3-909191-70-3
- Marcolli, Christian (2017): The Melting Point. How to stay cool and sustain world-class business performance. Urbane Publications, Kent. ISBN 978-1-911129-24-0
- Gisin, Dominique and Christian Marcolli (2015): Making it Happen. ISBN 3-909191-62-2
- Marcolli, Christian with Tarina Wagschal (2015): More Life, Please! The Performance Pathway to a Better You. Urbane Publications, Kent. ISBN 978-1-909273-93-1
- Marcolli, Christian and Colin H. Sims (2010): Equipping Yourself To Be A Business Champion. Personal Resource Guide. Focus Cross, Elstree. ISBN 978-0-9564342-1-0
- Marcolli, Christian and Colin H. Sims (2010): Teach Me Patience, NOW! Equip Yourself To Be A Business Champion. Focus Cross, Elstree. ISBN 978-0-9564342-0-3
- Marcolli, Christian (2002): Die psychologische Unterstützung in der Rehabilitation von Verletzungen. Ansätze für medizinische Fachkräfte. GFS-Schriften Sportwissenschaften 24, Zürich. ISBN 3-9521633-7-6
- Marcolli, Christian (2001): Die psychologische Rehabilitation nach Sportverletzungen. Entwicklung des Interventionsprogramms COMEBACK und Evaluation von dessen Auswirkungen. GFS-Schriften Sportwissenschaften 22, Zürich. ISBN 3-9521633-4-1

== Awards ==
- Literary Titan Book Award GOLD for „WINNING MATCH: Leadership for Game Changers - Together Toward the Extraordinary“
- IP Book Award SILVER for „More Life, Please!“

== Sources ==
- Die ersten 125 Jahre. Publisher: Josef Zindel im Friedrich Reinhardt Verlag, Basel. ISBN 978-3-7245-2305-5
- Verein "Basler Fussballarchiv" Homepage
