= Jorge Sosa (footballer) =

Mexican footballer and manager (born 1968)

Jorge Adrián Sosa Reyna (born 16 July 1968), known as Jorge Sosa, is a Mexican football manager and former player.

== Career ==
Born in Durango City, Durango, Sosa made his Primera División debut with C.F. Pachuca in 1996. He would later help Club Irapuato win the Primera "A" during the 2002–03 season, and then return to the Primera División with Irapuato during 2003.
