= Heinz Moser =

Swiss footballer and manager (born 1967)

Personal information
- Date of birth: 12 October 1967 (age 59)
- Position: Defender

Senior career*
Years	Team	Apps	(Gls)
1986–1992	FC Luzern		
1992–1995	BSC Young Boys		
1995–1996	FC Sion		
1996–1999	FC Luzern		
1999–2003	FC Thun		

Managerial career
- 2011–2012: Switzerland u-16
- 2012–2013: Switzerland u-17
- 2013–2014: Switzerland u-18
- 2014–2015: Switzerland u-19
- 2015–2018: Switzerland u-21
- 2018–: Switzerland u-19
- * Club domestic league appearances and goals

Heinz Moser (born 12 October 1967) is a retired Swiss football defender and later manager.

== Honours ==
=== Player ===
FC Sion

- Swiss Cup: 1994–95, 1995–96
