= Steve Guillod =

Swiss footballer (born 1968)

Personal information
- Date of birth: 27 December 1968 (age 57)
- Position: Forward

Senior career*
Years	Team	Apps	(Gls)
1987–1988	FC Fribourg		
1989–1990	FC Wettingen		
1991–1992	Grasshopper Club		
1992–1993	FC Bulle		
- * Club domestic league appearances and goals

Steve Guillod (born 27 December 1968) is a retired Swiss football striker.
