= 1995–96 FC Basel season =

FC Basel
1995–96 season
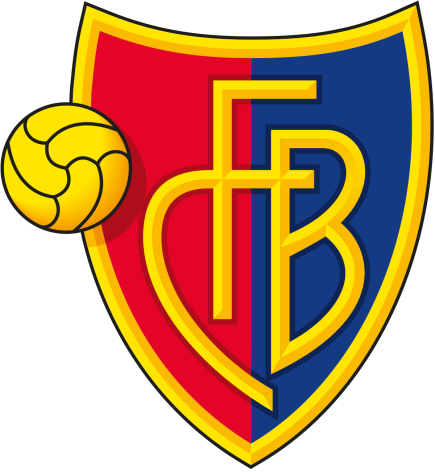
- Club president: Peter Epting
- Head coach: Claude Andrey (until October); Oldrich Svab (interim) from 16 November; Karl Engel
- Ground: St. Jakob Stadium, Basel
- NLA Qualifying Phase: 5th of 12
- Championship Group: 6th of 8
- Swiss Cup: Quarter-finals
- 1995 UEFA Intertoto Cup: 3rd in Group A
- Top goalscorer: League: Alexandre Rey (10); All: Alexandre Rey (17)
- Highest home attendance: 20,000 vs Luzern; 2 August 1995
- Lowest home attendance: 8,000 vs Grasshopper Club; 19 September 1995
- Average home league attendance: 12,000

The 1995–96 Fussball Club Basel 1893 season was their 103rd season since the club's foundation. Peter Epting was the club's chairman for the fourth period. FC Basel played their home games in the St. Jakob Stadium. Following their promotion in the 1993–94 season this was their second season back in the highest tier of Swiss football.

== Overview ==
=== Pre-season ===
Claude Andrey was again the club's manager, this was his third period as head-coach. However, due to a poor start to the season, he lost his job during October. Oldrich Svab then took over on an interim basis, until Karl Engel was appointed as new head-coach. There were a few players that left the squad. Mart van Duren retired from active football, Martin Jeitziner also retired from professional football and moved on to Old Boys, Ralph Steingruber moved onto St. Gallen, Asif Šarić returned to Germany and joined Sportfreunde Siegen and Thomas Karrer was on loan to Grenchen.

The club's priority aim for the season was to remain in the top flight of Swiss football. Therefore, the club made a number of new signings as the season started, these included the Nigerian national team goalkeeper Ike Shorunmu, who signed in from Shooting Stars, Gabriel Okolosi, who signed in from Africa Sports National, and Alex Nyarko, who came from Sportul. Another promising player was Vilmar who signed in from Ferroviária. David Orlando was signed in from Sion, the young Bruno Sutter from Young Fellows Zürich and Daniele Moro signed in from Xamax. Further, large number of youngsters were brought up from the youth team to train with the first team squad.

As Basel entered the Intertoto Cup they played just one pre-season Exhibition game, this was against the Ukrainian team Dnipro Dnipropetrovsk on the week-end before the season started. There were three further friendly matches, but these were played mid-season.

=== UEFA Intertoto Cup ===
The 1995 UEFA Intertoto Cup was held at the end of June and the beginning of July. Basel managed a home win against Sheffield Wednesday and an away win in Poland against Górnik Zabrze. But the other two games ended with defeats, at home against the Karlsruher SC and an away game against Aarhus GF. As group winners Karlsruhe continued to the next round.

=== Domestic league ===
At this time, the Swiss Football Association were reforming in the Swiss football league system. There was no amendment in the top-tier (NLA), but the number of second-tier (NLB) clubs was being reduced from 24 teams in two regional groups to just 12 teams in one division and this was being done in three steps over three seasons. The previous season had seen the second step, with a reduction of the two regional divisions from 10 to 8 teams. This season saw the final step, the NLB was now the second-tier in just one division with 12 teams. Therefore the top two divisions were now both contested by 12 teams. In the first stage, both divisions would play a qualification round. In the second stage the top eight teams of the NLA would play a championship round, with half the points from the first stage as bonus. The top four teams from the NLB would play a promotion/relegation round with the bottom four teams from NLA. However, there was one change at the start of the 1995–96 Nationalliga A season and that was that the Swiss Football Association introduced the three points for a win standard. This had been introduced by the FA in England in 1981, but did not attract much use elsewhere until it was used in the 1994 World Cup finals. In 1995, FIFA formally adopted the system, and it subsequently became standard in international tournaments, as well as most national football leagues.

The season started well for Basel, three wins in the first four games. But then, between the sixth and sixteenth round Basel suffered eight defeats in 11 games. It was at this point that Claude Andrey lost his job as head-coach, but the reasons were not just of sporting nature. Oldrich Svab took over on an interim basis on 28 October and until Karl Engel was appointed as new head-coach. The team caught themselves and qualified for the championship round. In the 22 games, Basel won nine, drew three and suffered ten defeats, scoring just 23 goals conceding 29. The team had collected 30 points and they were three points above the dividing line. In the championship round Basel did not record a victory until the ninth round, but they finished the season in sixth position and thus qualified for the 1996 UEFA Intertoto Cup. In the league they managed just three victories, four draws and suffered seven defeats, with just eleven goals for and 20 conceded. Alexandre Rey was the team's top league goal scorer and Hakan Yakin was second placed with five goals.

=== Swiss Cup ===
Basel entered the Swiss Cup in the third round. Here they defeated the lower tier club Subingen 6–1 and Alexandre Rey scored four goals. In the fourth and fifth round they defeated lower tier clubs Gossau 3–1 and Biel-Bienne 4–1. Thus Basel advanced to the quarter-finals and here they travelled to la Maladière in Neuchâtel, but were knocked out of the cup by Xamax 2–1 after extra time. Sion won the cup, beating Servette 3–2 in the final.

== Players ==
The following is the list of the Basel first team squad. It also includes players that were in the squad on the day that the season started on 24 June 1995 but subsequently left the club after that date.

Note: Flags indicate national team as defined under FIFA eligibility rules; some limited exceptions apply. Players may hold more than one non-FIFA nationality.

No.	Pos.	Nation	Player
1	GK	SUI	Stefan Huber
2	DF	SUI	Massimo Ceccaroni
3	DF	SUI	Marco Walker
4	DF	BIH	Samir Tabakovic
5	MF	SUI	Andre Meier
6	MF	GHA	Alex Nyarko (from Sportul)
7	MF	SUI	Bruno Sutter (from Young Fellows Zürich)
8	MF	SUI	Mario Cantaluppi
9	FW	SUI	Dario Zuffi
10	MF	BIH	Admir Smajić
11	FW	SUI	Alexandre Rey
12	GK	SUI	Thomas Grüter
13	DF	BRA	Vilmar (from Ferroviária)
14	MF	SUI	Theodoros Disseris (from Old Boys)
15	DF	FRA	Yassine Douimi (from Saint-Louis)

No.	Pos.	Nation	Player
16	MF	SUI	Dominic Moser
17	MF	SUI	Daniele Moro (from Xamax)
18	MF	SUI	Hakan Yakin
19	FW	SUI	Davide Orlando (from Sion)
20	MF	NIG	Gabriel Okolosi (from Africa Sports National)
—	GK	NIG	Ike Shorunmu (from Shooting Stars)
—	GK	SUI	Oliver Stöckli (from youth team)
—	DF	SUI	Yannick Hasler (from youth team)
—	DF	SUI	Oumar Kondé (from youth team)
—	DF	DEN	Lars Olsen
—	DF	TUR	Dilaver Satılmış (from youth team)
—	DF	SUI	Marco Tschopp (from youth team)
—	MF	SUI	Didier Gigon (to Xamax)
—	FW	SUI	Alexander Frei (from youth team)
—	FW	SUI	Roger Schreiber (to SV Muttenz)

Players who left the squad

Note: Flags indicate national team as defined under FIFA eligibility rules; some limited exceptions apply. Players may hold more than one non-FIFA nationality.

No.	Pos.	Nation	Player
—	GK	SUI	Andreas Niederer
—	GK	SUI	Yves Matthey-Doret (to SV Muttenz)
—	DF	SUI	Markus Lichtsteiner (to FC Riehen)
—	DF	SUI	Ralph Steingruber (to St. Gallen)

No.	Pos.	Nation	Player
—	MF	SUI	Martin Jeitziner (to Old Boys)
—	MF	BIH	Asif Šarić (to Sportfreunde Siegen)
—	DF	SUI	Thomas Karrer (loan to Grenchen)
—	FW	NED	Mart van Duren (Retired)

== Results ==
Legend

Win Draw Loss Postponed

=== Friendly matches ===
==== Pre- and mid-season ====
12 July 1995 Pre-season; Exhibition game	Basel (Switzerland)	0–1	(Ukraine) Dnipro Dnipropetrovsk	Gitterli, Liestal
19:00		FCB summary	71' (0:1) Kovalets	Attendance: 1,600; Referee: (Switzerland) Andreas Schluchter (Schönenbuch)
Note: Basel without Olsen, Cantaluppi, Disseris (all injured), Smajic, Zuffi, Rey and Ceccaroni (rested). Dnipro without Sassen (injured). Fair game, no warnings or cards.

12 August 1995 Mid-season	Basel (Switzerland)	0–2	(Russia) FC Spartak Moscow	Gigersloch, Dornach
17:00		FCB summary	53' (0:1) Mukhamadiev; 89' (0:2) Tikhonov	Attendance: 2,200; Referee: (Switzerland) Andreas Schluchter (Schönenbuch)
Note: FCB without Cantaluppi, Disseris, Rey, and Smajic. Spartak were without the national team players Mamedov, Nikiforov, Onopko, Khlestov, Kulykov, Nigmatulin, Lipko, and Ketchinov, as well as the ill Pisarev, Yuran, and Pertnitsky. A fair game, no cautions. Douimi was not used for FC Basel, but Walker came back into the game after being substituted out earlier.

3 September 1995 Mid-season	Basel (Switzerland)	0–0	(Switzerland) Grasshopper Club	Au, Münchenstein
15:00		FCB summary		Attendance: 2,000; Referee: (Switzerland) Jürg Herrmann (Hinterkapplen (Wohlen bei Bern))
Note: An exhibition game played within the FC Münchenstein celebrations 75 year anniversary. FCB without Meier, Smajic (rested), Moro (ill), Zuffi (injured), Yakin and Sutter (U21). Huber on the bench. GC without Rzasa, Gämperle, Yakin, Ibrahim (all injured), Thüler, Geiger, Vega, Zuberbühler, Vogel (national team), Comisetti and de Napoli (U21). Fair game, no warnings or cards.

7 October 1995 Mid-season	Basel (Switzerland)	2–3	(Italy) Italian 11	Im Feld, Oftringen
14:30	Rey 62' (1:0); Cantaluppi 77' (2:1)	FCB summary	65' (1:1) Margheriti; 80' (2:2) Sopranzi; 90' (2:3) Rossi	Attendance: 975; Referee: (Switzerland) Hans Müller (Bern)
Note: FCB without Smajic, Zuffi, Meier, Sutter, Yakin, Moser, Ceccaroni and Olsen.

==== Winter break ====
20 January 1996 Winter break	Winterthur (Switzerland)	1–3	(Switzerland) Basel	Schützenwiese, Winterthur
14:00	Burger 33' (1:0)	FCB summary	36' (pen. 1:1) Cantaluppi; 80' (1:2) Smajić; 84' (1:3) Nyarko	Attendance: 400; Referee: (Switzerland) Werner Müller (Obererlinsbach)
Note: Winterthur without Simunek (injured). FCB without Huber (substitute), Walker (ill), Rey (injured), Vilmar Barbosa (not in the squad); with Yannick Hasler (17/youth team) and Uli Forte (test player from Red Star) for the first time. Forte played on the right side of midfield in the second half, Ceccaroni at the back.

29 January 1996 Training camp	Basel (Switzerland)	2–1	(Germany) SC Freiburg	Paralimni Municipal Stadium "Tasos Markou", Cyprus
	Smajić 15' (1:0); Rey 43' (2:1)	FCB summary	20' (1:1) Spies; (yellow card) 45'Spanring	Attendance: 20; Referee: (Cyprus) Andreas Georghiu
Note: FCB without Huber, Walker, and Zuffi (who only arrived in Cyprus on the previous day). Freiburg were without Sundermann and Alain Sutter, who is currently in rehabilitation training after recovering from a stomach bug.

31 January 1996 Training camp	Basel (Switzerland)	2–0	(Germany) Borussia Dortmund Amateure	Paralimni Municipal Stadium "Tasos Markou", Cyprus
	Zuffi 47' (1:0); Yakin 77' (2:0)	FCB summary		Attendance: 20; Referee: (Cyprus) Andreas Georghiu

4 February 1996 Training camp	Basel (Switzerland)	1–0	(Bulgaria) CSKA Sofia	Municipal Stadium (Ayia Napa), Cyprus
	Rey 3' (1:0); Meier (yellow card) 24'; Orlando (yellow card) 27'; Yakin (yellow card) 65'	FCB summary	(yellow card) 25' Milosavov; (yellow card) 80' Georgiev	Attendance: 20; Referee: (Cyprus) ?
Note: FCB without Moro und Douimi (recovering after light injuries).

11 February 1996 Winter break	Lausanne-Sport (Switzerland)	1–2	(Switzerland) Basel	Stade Saint-Martin, Leytron
14:30	Romano 66' (1:1)	FCB summary	38' (0:1) Zuffi; 89' (1:2) Zuffi	Attendance: 280; Referee: (Switzerland) Vincent Dafflon
Note: Lausanne were without Piffaretti, Chassot, Comisetti, and Käslin (all injured). Basel were without Sutter (injured). The unused FCB squad players had training with co-coach Robert Kammer on a side pitch.

14 February 1996 Exhibition game	Basel (Switzerland)	1–1	(Switzerland) Zürich	Athletics Stadium, Basel
14:30	Moser 1' (1:0)	FCB summary FCZ summary	82' (1:1) Nonda	Attendance: 500; Referee: (Switzerland) Kurt Röthlisberger (Suhr)
Note: FCB without Ceccaroni, Smajic, Rey, and Sutter. FCZ without Fischer and Castillo.

17 February 1996 Winter break	Basel (Switzerland)	2–2	(Germany) SC Freiburg	Athletic stadium, Basel
14:30	Okolosi 11' (1:0); H. Yakin 75' (2:1)	FCB summary	38' (1:1) Freund; 86' (2:2) Rath	Attendance: 700; Referee: (Switzerland) Urs Meier (Wettingen and Würenlos)
Note: FCB without Walker and Rey. Freiburg without Decheiver, Sundermann, Spanring and Vogel.

18 February 1996 Winter break	SR Delémont (Switzerland)	3–2	(Switzerland) Basel	La Blancherie, Delémont
16:00	Renzi 59' (1:1); Vukic 71' (2:2); Przybylo 88' (3:2)	FCB summary	(yellow card) 51' H. Yakin; 49' (0:1) Nyarko; 68' (1:2) Zuffi; (yellow card) 83' Nyarko	Attendance: 800; Referee: (Switzerland) Dieter Schoch (Attiswil)
Note: FCB were without Walker, Rey, and Smajic (all injured, Smajic with a contusion from the Freiburg match) and without Ceccaroni (rested). FCB were testing the 21-year-old Brazilian striker Everton. After his substitution, Meier played in central midfield, and Moro initially played as a right-sided center-back, before moving into central defense after Cantaluppi came on.

=== Nationalliga A ===
The first stage of the NLA began on 19 July 1995 and was completed on 10 December. The top eight teams in the qualification phase would advance to the championship group and the last four teams would play against relegation.

==== Qualifying Phase ====
19 July 1995 Round 1	Basel	2–1	Sion	St. Jakob Stadium, Basel
20:00	Rey 25' (1:0); Rey 28' (2:0); Nyarko (yellow card) 80'	FCB summary	(yellow card) 28' Lehmann; (yellow card) 47' Quentin; 48' (2:1) Vercruysse; (yellow card) 55' Sylvestre; (yellow card) 59' Gaspoz; (yellow card) 62' Wicky; (yellow card) 80' Herr; (red card) 90' Kombouaré	Attendance: 14,000; Referee: (Switzerland) Kurt Röthlisberger (Suhr, Aargau)
Note: FCB without the injured Cantaluppi, Olsen, Disseris, Douimi and Orlando. 34th minute, Okolosi was substituted out with a thigh cramp. FC Sion complete, with the following celebrities on the bench: Bonvin, Chassot, La Placa, Gaspoz and goalkeeper Borer. 87th minute, Wicky's goal was canceled due to positional offside.

22 July 1995 Round 2	Young Boys	1–4	Basel	Wankdorf Stadium, Bern
17:30	Dittgen 53' (1:1); Aebi (yellow card) 61'	FCB summary	24' (0:1) Walker; 78' (1:2) Rey; 82' (1:3) Zuffi; 84' (1:4) Zuffi; (yellow card) Walker; (yellow card) Zuffi; (yellow card) Rey	Attendance: 9,000; Referee: (Liechtenstein) Roland Beck (Triesenberg)
Note: YB without the injured Gertschen and Plevka. FCB without the injured Cantaluppi, the suspended Orlando, the not-yet-qualified Moro, and without Olsen (fourth foreign player). 48th minute, Neff's cross hits the inside of the post. 50th minute, Rey hits the crossbar. Poor refereeing performance. About 6,000 FCB supporters in the stadium.

29 July 1995 Round 3	Xamax	1–0	Basel	Stade de la Maladière (1924), Neuchâtel
20:00	Vernier (yellow card) 7'; Kunz 86' (1:0); Perret (yellow card) 90+2'	FCB summary	(yellow card) 8' Orlando; (yellow card) 68' Moro	Attendance: 15,200; Referee: (Switzerland) Erwin Fölmli
Note: Xamax fielded their full squad. FCB without Cantaluppi (injured) and Tabakovic (extra foreign player). Olsen was a substitute. Corner kicks: 12-5. - Satisfactory refereeing performance.

2 August 1995 Round 4	Basel	2–0	Luzern	St. Jakob Stadium, Basel
20:00	Okolosi 16' (1:0); Okolosi 66' (2:0); Ceccaroni (yellow card) 61'	FCB summary	(yellow card) 30' Mutter; (yellow card) 45' Wyss	Attendance: 20,000; Referee: (Switzerland) Claude Detruche (Thônex)
Note: FCB without the injured Rey, Cantaluppi, and Disseris, as well as Olsen (extra foreign player). FCL without Renggli (injured) and Kurniawan (extra foreign player). 56th and 68th minute, two goals from Okolosi disallowed for offside. Corners: 9:7.

5 August 1995 Round 5	Zürich	0–0	Basel	Letzigrund, Zürich
16:00	Gambino (yellow card) 5'; Hoeks (yellow card) 52'	FCZ summary FCB summary		Attendance: 13,500; Referee: (Switzerland) Hans Müller (Bern)
Note: FCZ without the injured Walker, Widmer, Hodel, Disler, FCB without Cantaluppi and Rey (injured), Smajic (sick) and without Olsen (extra foreigner). According to NZZ, mainly FCB fans at the Letzigrund. According to BaZ, around 9,000 FCB supporters in the stadium. Corners: 4:4. Good referee.

19 August 1995 Round 6	Basel	0–2	Lugano	St. Jakob Stadium, Basel
20:00	Walker (yellow card) 45'	FCB summary	(yellow card) 43' Colombo; 43' (0:1) Erceg; 89' (0:2) Shalimov	Attendance: 18,000; Referee: (Switzerland) Serge Muhmenthaler (Grenchen)
Note: FCB without Cantaluppi, Moser, Nyarko, Orlando, and Disseris; FC Lugano were without Mauro Galvao and Manfreda (all injured). Corners: 6-7. Good refereeing performance.

26 August 1995 Round 7	Servette	1–2	Basel	Charmilles Stadium, Geneva
20:00	Duchosal 85' (1:2)	FCB summary	19' (0:1) Smajić; 33' (0:2) Rey; (yellow card) 39' Meier; (yellow card) 61' Tabakovic; (yellow card) 80' H. Yakin	Attendance: 6,400; Referee: (Liechtenstein) Roland Beck (Triesenberg)
Note: Servette without Sogbie, Weiler, Barea, Margarini (all injured), Ippoliti (suspended), and Juarez (not in the squad). FCB without Zuffi, Cantaluppi, Moser, Orlando, Nyarko, Schreiber, and Disseris (all injured). Marco Tschopp made his league debut for FC Basel. The referee's performance was inadequate.

29 August 1995 Round 8	Aarau	2–0	Basel	Stadion Brügglifeld, Aarau
19:30	Markovic 24' (1:0); Wyss (yellow card) 54'; Markovic (yellow card) 55'; Ratinho (yellow card) 62'; Allenspach 90+2' (2:0)	FCB summary FCA summary	(yellow card) 21' Okolosi; (yellow card) 29' Walker; (yellow card) 33' Tabakovic	Attendance: 6,800; Referee: (Switzerland) Freddy Philippoz (Sion)
Note: FCA played without the injured or sick Brugnoli, Heldmann, and Skrzypczak; FCB without the injured Cantaluppi, Disseris, Schreiber, Zuffi, Moser, Nyarko, and Orlando. Daniel Wyss was honored for his 200th league appearance with FC Aarau.

9 September 1995 Round 9	Basel	0–1	Lausanne-Sport	St. Jakob Stadium, Basel
20:00	Smajić (yellow card) 61'	FCB summary	(yellow card) 25' Biaggi; 74' (0:1) Küffer	Attendance: 14,000; Referee: (Switzerland) Carlo Bertolini (Vira-Gambarogno)
Note: FCB without Nyarko, Zuffi, Meier, Disseris, and Douimi (all injured). Lausanne were without Savovic and Romano (both injured). A satisfactory NLA debut for referee Bertolini.

16 September 1995 Round 10	St. Gallen	0–1	Basel	Espenmoos, St. Gallen
17:30	Mouidi (yellow card) 27'; De Siebenthal (yellow card) 36'; Milton (yellow card) 42'	FCB summary	(yellow card) 3' Tabakovic; 38' (0:1) Rey; (yellow card) 39' Cantaluppi; (yellow card) 45' Orlando; (yellow card) 70' Walker	Attendance: 11,500; Referee: (Switzerland) Urs Meier (Wettingen and Würenlos)
Note: St. Gallen without Tejeda and Wanner (both injured). FCB without Zuffi, Nyarko, Meier, Disseris, Douimi, and Dominic Moser (all injured) and had only three substitutes: goalkeeper Grüter, Okolosi, and Sutter. Milton played in central defense after Frick's substitution (46th minute), with Koch at right-back. 2nd minute, a header from Cantaluppi hit the crossbar. 3rd minute, a header from Walker also hit the crossbar. Walker and Tabakovic are suspended for the next match (to days later against Grasshoppers). A good refereeing performance in a very difficult game.

19 September 1995 Round 11	Basel	1–3	Grasshopper Club	St. Jakob Stadium, Basel
20:00	Moro 86' (1:3)	FCB summary	16' (0:1) Comisetti; 18' (0:2) Comisetti; 71' (0:3) de Napoli	Attendance: 8,000; Referee: (Switzerland) Kurt Röthlisberger (Suhr, Aargau)
Note: FCB without Zuffi, Nyarko, Meier, Moser, Disseris, Douimi (injured), Tabakovic, and Walker (suspended); GC were without the injured Zuberbühler, Gämperle, Rzasa, and Subiat, as well as the suspended Thüler, Vega, and Viscaal. No cautions were issued in an absolutely fair and impeccably officiated match. Torrential rain persisted for almost the entire game. 16th minute, Magnin hit the post and the rebound was converted by Comisetti. The lowest attendance of the season was recorded due to the miserable weather and the first live TV broadcast of the season.

1 October 1995 Round 12	Sion	4–1	Basel	Stade Tourbillon, Sion
14:30	Quentin 21' (1:0); Kombouaré 27' (pen.); Mirandinha 36' (3:0); Mirandinha (yellow card) 41'; Kombouaré 45' (pen.); Quentin (yellow card) 82'	FCB summary	(red card) 32' Orlando; (yellow card) 71' Walker; 73' (pen. 4:1) Smajić	Attendance: 8,500; Referee: (Switzerland) Serge Muhmenthaler (Grenchen)
Note: Sion without the injured Vercruysse. FCB without the injured Ceccaroni, Zuffi and Meier, as well as without Okolosi (an extra foreign player).

4 October 1995 Round 13	Basel	1–0	Young Boys	St. Jakob Stadium, Basel
20:00	Ceccaroni (yellow card) 24'; Smajić (penalty missed) 26′ Smajić (yellow card) 34'; H. Yakin 36' (1:0); Rey (yellow card) 73'	FCB summary	(yellow card) 7' Dittgen; (yellow card) 20' Neqrouz	Attendance: 10,000; Referee: (Switzerland) Dieter Schoch (Attiswil)
Note: FC Basel were without the injured Meier and Zuffi, the ill Okolosi, and the suspended Orlando. Disseris made his NLA debut. Young Boys were without the injured Rotzetter. In the 26th minute, Pulver saved the penalty from Smajic. In the 31st minute, goal from Rey was disallowed for offside.

14 October 1995 Round 14	Basel	0–2	Xamax	St. Jakob Stadium, Basel
20:00	Zuffi (yellow card) 83'	FCB summary	43' (0:1) Moldovan; 85' (0:2) Drakopoulos	Attendance: 13,000; Referee: (Switzerland) Urs Meier (Wettingen and Würenlos)
Note: FCB without Orlando (suspended), Moser (angina), Ceccaroni, Meier, and Olsen (injured). Xamax fielded their strongest lineup. In the 28th minute, Walker's header hit the post. In the 77th minute, Okolosi hit the crossbar. Good refereeing performance.

21 October 1995 Round 15	Luzern	3–1	Basel	Stadion Allmend Luzern
20:00	Aleksandrov 34' (1:0); Camenzind (yellow card) 41'; Fink 56' (2:0); Kurniawan 85' (3:1)	FCB summary	(yellow card) 21' Walker; 64' (pen.) Zuffi	Attendance: 16,000; Referee: (Switzerland) Hans Müller (Bern)
Note: FCL played without Gmür (suspended), FCB without Meier, Olsen (both injured) and Moser (ill). There were not the slightest incidents among the spectators, although (or perhaps because) the fan sections were no longer separated in "cages" and the police acted less provocatively than in previous cases.

28 October 1995 Round 16	Basel	0–3	Zürich	St. Jakob Stadium, Basel
20:00	Smajić (yellow card) 88'	FCB summary FCZ summary	10' (0:1) Güntensperger; 44' (0:2) Gambino; (yellow card) 85' Makalakalane; 90' (0:3) Castillo	Attendance: 13,500; Referee: (Switzerland) Werner Müller (Obererlinsbach)
Note: FCB's first match after sacking head-coach Claude Andrey with Oldřich Šváb as interims coach on the side-line. FCB without the injured Meier and Cantaluppi, as well as Tabakovic, who, although officially listed as injured, was effectively an extra foreign player. FCZ without di Jorio, Disler, Hodel, Walker, and Widmer.

5 November 1995 Round 17	Lugano	0–1	Basel	Cornaredo, Lugano
14:30	Bugnard (yellow card) 85'	FCB summary	(yellow card) 62' Walker; (yellow card) 67' Zuffi; 76' (0:1) Nyarko	Attendance: 4,000; Referee: (Liechtenstein) Roland Beck (Triesenberg)
Note: Lugano were without the injured Galvao, Esposito, Modica, and Ferraira Sinval (not in the squad). Defender Englund, who returned from AIK Stockholm, was back in the lineup for the first time. FCB without Meier and Moro (injured), Smajic (suspended), Okolosi (not in the squad), and Vilmar Santos Barbosa (not yet eligible to play). Lugano with change of tactic during the match: Shalimov moved to the center in the 15th minute, with Carrasco playing on the left in build-up play. 45th minute, shot from Marco Walker hit the crossbar. 62th minute Walker cautioned for foul, 6th yellow card this season, therefore suspended for the next two games). Corner kicks: 2-4.

12 November 1995 Round 18	Basel	2–2	Servette	St. Jakob Stadium, Basel
14:30	Rey 8' (1:0); Rey 61' (2:2); Zuffi (penalty missed) 64′	FCB summary	(yellow card) 3' Eriksson; 32' (1:1) Margarini; 45+2' (1:2) Neuville; (yellow card) 49' Pascolo; (yellow card) 85' Karlen	Attendance: 16,000; Referee: (Switzerland) Kurt Röthlisberger (Suhr, Aargau)
Note: FC Basel were without the recovering Meier and Moro, as well as the suspended Walker. Servette were without Barea (suspended) and Nemecek (Czech Republic national team). In the 64th minute, Pascolo saved Zuffi's penalty. HSV coach Felix Magath was among the spectators. Corner kicks: 16-1 (9-0).

19 November 1995 Round 19	Basel	2–1	Aarau	St. Jakob Stadium, Basel
14:30	Sutter 12' (1:0); Olsen (yellow card) 40'; Nyarko (yellow card) 57'; Moser 83' (2:1)	FCB summary FCA summary	(yellow card) 26' Christ; 33' (1:1) Ratinho; (yellow card) 36' Skrzypczak; (yellow card) 38' Pavličević	Attendance: 13,000; Referee: (Switzerland) Karl Strässle (Steinach)
Note: FCB's first match with new head-coach Karl Engel. FCB without Meier (convalescent) and Walker (suspended). FCA without Heldmann, Brugnoli and reserve goalie Müller (all injured). Corner: 3:3 (1:2).

26 November 1995 Round 20	Lausanne-Sport	1–0	Basel	Olympique de la Pontaise, Lausanne
14:30	Dembiński 30' (1:0); Käslin (yellow card) 71'; Hänzi (yellow card) 79'	FCB summary	(yellow card) 57' Walker; (red card) 61' Nyarko	Attendance: 6,250; Referee: (Switzerland) Werner Müller (Obererlinsbach)
Note: Lausanne without Diogo, Romano (injured), Küffer suspended; FCB without Meier and Moro (rehabilitation training). 19th minute: Olsen clears a shot from Käslin off the goal line. Basel with tactical change after Nyarko's sending-off: Orlando in defense, Walker forward, and Rey back in midfield; Moser and Smajic essentially second and third strikers alongside Zuffi. Corners: 3-6. Correct refereeing.

3 December 1995 Round 21	Basel	0–0	St. Gallen	St. Jakob Stadium, Basel
14:30	Rey (yellow card) 25'	FCB summary	(yellow card) 10' Steingruber; (yellow card) 33' Winkler; (yellow card) 38' Zellweger; (yellow card) 57' Tejeda; (yellow card) 67' Diallo	Attendance: 13,500; Referee: (Switzerland) Urs Meier (Wettingen and Würenlos)
Note: FCB without Nyarko (suspended) and Zuffi (flu). St. Gallen were without Milton (suspended), Frick (ill), Andrioli, Brunner, and de Siebenthal (all injured). Basel with change of tactic after Moser's substitution for Yakin (65th minute): Moser in the center, Orlando in attack, Bruno Sutter on the left wing. Corners: 4-4. A mediocre performance by referee Meier, by his standards.

10 December 1995 Round 22	Grasshopper Club	1–3	Basel	Hardturm, Zürich
14:30	Comisetti (yellow card) 32'; M. Yakin 47'; M. Yakin (yellow card) 75'; Haas (yellow card) 90'	FCB summary	7' (0:1) Rey; (yellow card) 33' Tabakovic; 36' (2:0) Rey; (yellow card) 41' Smajić; 43' Zuffi; (yellow card) 77' Cantaluppi	Attendance: 11,200; Referee: (Switzerland) Urs Meier (Wettingen and Würenlos)
Note: GC without Nemtsoudis, Subiat, Thüler, Viscaal, Vogel, Zuberbühler (all injured) and Udi (national team). FCB without Okolosi (injured) and Nyarko (suspended). Tactical change 46th minute by GC after Murat Yakin's substitution, Geiger played in central defense, with Yakin in midfield. Tactical change in the 57th minute by FCB following Orlando's substitution, Sutter played in central midfield, with Orlando on the left. 64th minute, Ibrahim's handball goal was disallowed.

==== League table ====
Pos	Team	Pld	W	D	L	GF	GA	GD	Pts	Qualification
1	Grasshopper Club Zürich	22	13	4	5	38	22	+16	43	Advance to championship round halved points (rounded up) as bonus
2	FC Sion	22	13	3	6	37	28	+9	42	Advance to championship round halved points (rounded up) as bonus
3	Neuchâtel Xamax	22	12	5	5	40	24	+16	41	Advance to championship round halved points (rounded up) as bonus
4	FC Lucerne	22	11	7	4	36	25	+11	40	Advance to championship round halved points (rounded up) as bonus
5	FC Basel	22	9	3	10	23	29	−6	30	Advance to championship round halved points (rounded up) as bonus
6	Servette FC	22	7	7	8	28	28	0	28	Advance to championship round halved points (rounded up) as bonus
7	FC Aarau	22	7	6	9	36	27	+9	27	Advance to championship round halved points (rounded up) as bonus
8	FC St. Gallen	22	6	9	7	26	24	+2	27	Advance to championship round halved points (rounded up) as bonus
9	Lausanne Sports	22	6	9	7	25	25	0	27	Continue to promotion/relegation round
10	AC Lugano	22	5	6	11	21	42	−21	21	Continue to promotion/relegation round
11	FC Zürich	22	4	6	12	17	32	−15	18	Continue to promotion/relegation round
12	BSC Young Boys	22	4	5	13	14	35	−21	17	Continue to promotion/relegation round

Source: rsssf.com
Rules for classification: 1) Points; 2) Goal difference; 3) Goals scored; 4) Head-to-head points; 5) Away goals scored; 6) Draw.

==== Championship Group ====
25 February 1996 Round 1	Servette	1–1	Basel	Charmilles Stadium, Geneva
14:30	Ippoliti 6' (1:0); Weiler (yellow card) 15'; Němeček (yellow card) 34'; Vilmar (yellow card) 39'; Juárez (yellow card) 87'	FCB summary	H. Yakin 73' (1:1)	Attendance: 7,500; Referee: (Switzerland) Urs Meier (Wettingen and Würenlos)
Note: Servette without Fernandez and Duchosal (both injured). FCB without Nyarko, Orlando (both suspended), Rey, Walker (both injured) and Disseris (ill).

3 March 1996 Round 2	Basel	1–2	Xamax	St. Jakob Stadium, Basel
14:30	Sutter 66' (1:1)	FCB summary	24' (0:1) Moldovan; (yellow card) 77' Vernier; 78' (1:2) Kunz	Attendance: 17,000; Referee: (Switzerland) Werner Müller (Obererlinsbach)
Note: FCB without Disseris, Moro (both sick) and Okolosi (4th foreigner). Xamax without Corminbúuf (injured). Walker (strain) and Zuffi (hit on the knee) were both substituted out injured.

17 March 1996 Round 3	Sion	2–0	Basel	Stade Tourbillon, Sion
14:30	Vidmar 40' (pen.); Herr (yellow card) 42'; Quentin (yellow card) 74'; Colombo 90' (2:0)	FCB summary	(yellow card) 39' Huber; (red card) 43' Engel (head-coach, not on pitch); (yellow card) 72' Smajić	Attendance: 12,800; Referee: (Switzerland) Serge Muhmenthaler (Grenchen)
Note: Sion without Wicky, Kombouaré (injured) and Giallanza (not in the squad). FCB without Ceccaroni, Walker (both injured) and Okolosi (fourth foreigner). 43rd minute, FCB head-coach Karl Engel banished to the stands (complaining). Cantaluppi substituted out with a joint capsule injury, Rey with a medial ligament contusion and Nyarko with a concussion.

24 March 1996 Round 4	Basel	1–3	Aarau	St. Jakob Stadium, Basel
14:30	Cantaluppi (yellow card) 22'; Orlando (yellow card) 29'; Nyarko 33' (1:1)	FCB summary FCA summary	20' (1:0) Studer; (yellow card) 21' Kilian; (yellow card) 22' Wyss; (yellow card) 40' Skrzypczak; 51' (1:2) Studer; 79' (1:3) Markovic	Attendance: 13,500; Referee: (Switzerland) Dieter Schoch (Attiswil)
Note: FCB without Walker, Disseris (both injured), Okolosi (fourth foreign player) and Moro (playing in the youth academy). FCA without Allenspach, Bader, Brugnoli, Müller, Wiederkehr and Zitola (all injured).

31 March 1996 Round 5	Basel	1–1	St. Gallen	St. Jakob Stadium, Basel
14:30	Walker 72' (1:1); Cantaluppi (yellow card) 86'	FCB summary	(yellow card) 26' Bühlmann; (yellow card) 33' Mouidi; 44' (pen.)Frick; (yellow card) 67' Koch	Attendance: 6,500; Referee: (Switzerland) Marcel Vollenweider (Rüti, Zürich)
Note: FCB without Tabakovic (ill/underwent tonsil surgery a few days later) and Disseris (injured). St. Gallen were without Andrioli, De Siebenthal, Steingruber (all injured) and Brunner (suspended).

7 April 1996 Round 6	Luzern	P–P	Basel	Stadion Allmend Luzern
14:30
Note: The match was originally scheduled for 8 April 1996. The Swiss Football Association posponed it and reschduled it later, because FC Basel would not have been able to field a full team due to illness and injuries.

14 April 1996 Round 7	Grasshopper Club	3–0	Basel	Hardturm, Zürich
14:30	Türkyilmaz (penalty missed) 23′ Vega 32' (1:0); Ibrahim (yellow card) 62'; Smiljanić (yellow card) 83'; Türkyilmaz 84' (2:0); Türkyilmaz 90' (pen.)	FCB summary	(yellow card) 27' Okolosi; (yellow card) 31' Orlando; (yellow card) 75' Walker	Attendance: 8,500; Referee: (Switzerland) Serge Muhmenthaler (Grenchen)
Note: GC without Geiger, Subiat, Thüler, and Murat Yakin (all injured) as well as Comisetti (suspended). FCB without Tabakovic (recovering), Disseris (injured), Moser, Rey, and Vilmar (all ill). 23rd minute, FCB goalkeeper Huber saved the penalty from Türkyilmaz.

18 April 1996 Round 8	Basel	0–2	Grasshopper Club	St. Jakob Stadium, Basel
20:00		FCB summary	(yellow card) 45' Türkyilmaz; (yellow card) 50' Vega; (yellow card) 66' Comisetti; 71' (0:1) Erceg; 76' (0:2) Türkyilmaz	Attendance: 8,500; Referee: (Switzerland) Kurt Röthlisberger (Suhr, Aargau)
Note: FCB without Tabakovic (recovering), Disseris and Rey (both injured). GC without Geiger, Subiat, Thüler and Murat Yakin (all injured) and Comisetti (suspended).

21 April 1996 Round 9	Basel	1–0	Luzern	St. Jakob Stadium, Basel
14:30	Knez (yellow card) 1'; H. Yakin 46' (1:0)	FCB summary	(yellow card) 21' van Eck	Attendance: 8,000; Referee: (Switzerland) Werner Müller (Obererlinsbach)
Note: FCB without Ceccaroni, Disseris, Rey (all injured), Tabakovic (recovering), and Vilmar (fourth foreign player). Lucerne were without Wolf and Wyss (injured). 22nd minute, a shot from Walker hit the crossbar.

27 April 1996 Round 10	St. Gallen	3–0	Basel	Espenmoos, St. Gallen
17:30	Bühlmann 35'; Diallo 83' (pen.), 84'; Giannini (yellow card) 90+1'	FCB summary	(yellow card) 34' Smajić	Attendance: 5,500; Referee: (Switzerland) Carlo Bertolini (Vira-Gambarogno)
Note: St. Gallen were without de Siebenthal, Steingruber, Andrioli (all injured) and Slavtschev (youth team). Basel were without Nyarko (suspended), Tabakovic (recovering), Orlando (injured) and Konde (U-16 European Championship).

30 April 1996 Round 11	Aarau	1–0	Basel	Stadion Brügglifeld, Aarau
19:30	Pavličević (yellow card) 10'; Ratinho 13' (1:0); Allenspach (yellow card) 56'; Bader (yellow card) 79'	FCB summary FCA summary	(yellow card) 9' Cantaluppi; (yellow card) 33' Rey	Attendance: 5,100; Referee: (Switzerland) Hans Stalder
Note: FCA without Brugnoli, Kilian and Müller (all injured); FCB without Hasler, Orlando (both injured) and Tabakovic (recovering). 35th minute, a clearance from Heldmann hits his own post. Dismissed Bayern coach Otto Rehhagel in the stands.

4 May 1996 Round 12	Basel	2–0	Sion	St. Jakob Stadium, Basel
20:00	Nyarko (yellow card) 52'; H. Yakin 74' (1:0); Zuffi (yellow card) 80'; Disseris (yellow card) 83'; Rey 85' (2:0)	FCB summary	(yellow card) 30' Gaspoz	Attendance: 5,000; Referee: (Switzerland) Jürg Herrmann (Hinterkapplen (Wohlen bei Bern))
Note: FCB without Orlando, Hasler (injured), Tabakovic (recovering), Cantaluppi and Meier (both suspended). Sion without Herr, Bonvin (both injured) and Kombouaré (suspended).

8 May 1996 Round 6	Luzern	1–1	Basel	Stadion Allmend Luzern
20:00	Gmür (yellow card) 44'; Sawu 77' (1:0); Joller (yellow card) 78'; Fink (yellow card) 88'	FCB summary	(yellow card) 5' Walker; (yellow card) 26' Cantaluppi; 84' (1:1) H. Yakin	Attendance: 12,190; Referee: (Switzerland) Thomas Meier
Note: FCL without Wolf, Wyss (both injured), and Kurniawan (fourth foreign player). FCB played without Sutter (injured) and Tabakovic (recovering). 72nd minute, a shot from Sawu hit the post. The match was originally scheduled for 8 April 1996. However, this match had to be postponed because FC Basel would not have been able to field a full team due to illness and injuries.

11 May 1996 Round 13	Xamax	1–1	Basel	Stade de la Maladière (1924), Neuchâtel
20:00	Perret (yellow card) 24'; Moldovan 56' (1:1); Moldovan (yellow card) 60'	FCB summary	8' (0:1) H. Yakin; (yellow card) 30' Zuffi; (yellow card) 30' Cantaluppi; (yellow card) 46' H. Yakin; (yellow card) 61' Smajić	Attendance: 4,000; Referee: (Switzerland) Dominique Tavel (Lonay)
Note: Xamax without Vernier and Kägi (both injured) and Pana (surplus foreigner). Basel without Orlando and Disseris (both injured) and Tabakovic (convalescent). Match kicked off 15 minutes late due to player protest over non-recognition of Profoot by the National League. 29th minute, a shot from Zuffi onto the lower edge of the crossbar that rebounded back into play. 51st minute, Martin heads the ball onto his own post.

14 May 1996 Round 14	Basel	2–0	Servette	St. Jakob Stadium, Basel
20:00	Nyarko 40' (1:0); Rey (yellow card) 55'; Cantaluppi (yellow card) 75'; Sutter 81' (2:0)	FCB summary	(yellow card) 33' Barea	Attendance: 4,500; Referee: (Switzerland) Vincent Dafflon
Note: FCB without Smajic (suspended), Orlando and Hasler (both injured). Servette without Juarez and Renato (both injured). Besides the Swiss national coach Artur Jorge, representatives of numerous Bundesliga clubs were also in the stands: Klaus Toppmöller (VfL Bochum) as well as interested parties from 1860 Munich and 1. FC Kaiserslautern.

==== League table ====
Pos	Team	Pld	W	D	L	GF	GA	GD	BP	Pts	Qualification
1	Grasshopper Club	14	8	6	0	26	7	+19	22	52	Swiss champions, qualified for 1996–97 Champions League
2	Sion	14	8	2	4	20	14	+6	21	47	Swiss Cup winners, qualified for 1996–97 Cup Winners' Cup
3	Xamax	14	5	7	2	21	16	+5	21	43	qualified for 1996–97 UEFA Cup
4	Aarau	14	7	4	3	23	18	+5	14	39	qualified for 1996–97 UEFA Cup
5	Luzern	14	4	3	7	23	19	+4	20	35	entered 1996 UEFA Intertoto Cup
6	Basel	14	3	4	7	11	20	−9	15	28	entered 1996 UEFA Intertoto Cup
7	Servette	14	2	5	7	18	25	−7	14	25	
8	St. Gallen	14	2	3	9	11	34	−23	14	23	

Source: rsssf.com

=== Swiss Cup ===
23 September 1995 Round 3	FC Subingen	1–6	Basel	Sportplatz Affoltern, Subingen
17:00	Styner 38' (1:3)	FCB summary	8' (0:1) Rey; 13' (0:2) Okolosi; 37' (0:3) Rey; 49' (1:4) Rey; (yellow card) 69' Walker; 75' (1:5) H. Yakin; 77' (pen.) Rey	Attendance: 3,200; Referee: (Switzerland) Markus Nobs (Wohlen bei Bern)
Note: FC Subingen played the 1995/96 in the 2. Liga (fourth-tier). Subingen complete, FC Basel without the injured Zuffi, Nyarko and Ceccaroni. - Around 2000 FCB supporters present. Huber Captain.

10 March 1996 Round 4	Gossau	0–2	Basel	Gemeindesportplatz, Gossau
15:00	Schnelli (yellow card) 26'	FCB summary	(yellow card) 36' Meier; 36' (0:1) Nyarko; (yellow card) 44' Zuffi; 90+1' (0:2) Okolosi	Attendance: 2,500; Referee: (Switzerland) Urs Meier (Würenlos)
Note: FC Gossau played the 1995/96 in the 1. Liga, Group 4 (third-tier). Gossau without Ljaljic (still ineligible to play after transferring from Wil). Basel without Walker, Ceccaroni (both injured), Tabakovic (ill), and Yakin (called up to the youth team after poor training performances). Debut of the almost 17-year-old Swiss U-17 international Oumar Kondé. 29th minute: Soller (Gossau) hits the post. 71st minute: Hutter (Gossau) hits the post. The pitch, cleared of 30 centimeters of snow the previous week, was still frozen under a quite uneven, softened layer and difficult to play upon.

21 March 1996	Biel-Bienne	1–4	Basel	Gurzelen Stadion, Biel/Bienne
20:00	Eberhard (yellow card) 38'; Sahli 88' (pen.)	FCB summary	(yellow card) 29' Cantaluppi; 41' Rey; 53' Tabakovic; 67' Zuffi; 90' H. Yakin	Attendance: 3,798; Referee: (Liechtenstein) Roland Beck (Triesenberg)
Note: FC Biel-Bienne played the 1995/96 in the 1. Liga, Group 2 (third-tier). Biel were without Desilvestri, Todt, Chételat, Renfer, and Uebelhard (all injured). Basel were without Walker and Ceccaroni (both injured). Disseris left the field with a strain. Cantaluppi then temporarily played at right-back. After halftime, FC Basel played with only three defenders.

23 April 1996 Quarter-final	Xamax	2–1 (a.e.t.)	Basel	Stade de la Maladière (1924), Neuchâtel
20:00	Kunz 16' (1:0); Bonalair (yellow card) 44'; Kunz 94' (2:1)	FCB summary	38' (1:1) H. Yakin; (yellow card) 28' (yellow-red card) 71' Nyarko; (yellow card) 111' Orlando	Attendance: 4,400; Referee: (Switzerland) Kurt Röthlisberger (Suhr, Aargau)
Note: Xamax without Kägi, Pana, Vernier (all injured) and Panduru (national team); Basel without Ceccaroni, Disseris (both injured) and Tabakovic (convalescent). 118th minute, Sutter left the pitch injured. The game was originally scheduled for 11 April, but had to be postponed because 6 FCB players were not fit to play due to a bacterial infection.

=== Intertoto Cup ===
==== Group 1 ====
24 June 1995 Round 1	Basel (Switzerland)	1–0	(England) Sheffield Wednesday	St. Jakob Stadium, Basel
20:00	Walker (yellow card) 14'; Rey 68' (1:0)	FCB summary	(yellow card) 14' Brien	Attendance: 5,200; Referee: Ladislav Gádoši (Austria)
Note: FCB were without Cantaluppi (recovering from surgery, starting light training that Monday and expected to be fit again within two months at the latest), Gigon (ill), Douimi (extra foreign player), and Orlando (not yet eligible to play internationally). Sheffield Wednesday were without internationals Waddle, Woods, Sinton, and Walker, among others. 67th minute, a goal from Moser was disallowed for a foul (Rey on Stewart).

1 July 1995 Round 2	Górnik Zabrze (Poland)	1–2	(Switzerland) Basel	Stadion Górnika, Zabrze
17:00	Brzoza 39' (1:1); Brzoza (penalty missed) 47′	FCB summary	(yellow card) 24' Douimi; 27' (0:1) Zuffi; 41' (1:2) Zuffi; (yellow card) 84' Walker	Attendance: 1,714; Referee: Ladislav Gádoši (Slovakia)
Note: Gornik complete. FCB without Cantaluppi (out until the end of September after groin surgery), Gigon (ill), Olsen (thigh strain), Müller, Orlando, Niarko and Sie-Donald (all ineligible). 47th minute: FCB goalkeeper Huber saves a from Brzoza (foul by Douimi on Kampka).

8 July 1995 Round 3	Basel (Switzerland)	2–3	(Germany) Karlsruhe	St. Jakob Stadium, Basel
16:00	Nyarko (yellow card) 33'; Zuffi 39' (pen.); Ceccaroni (yellow card) 53'; Gigon (yellow card) 71'; Rey 84' (2:3)	FCB summary	13' (0:1) Fink; (yellow card) 19' Reich; 31' (0:2) Nowotny; (yellow card) 37' Metz; (yellow card) 43' Kiriakov; (yellow card) 56' Nowotny; (yellow card) 64' Schuster; 78' (1:3) Schmitt	Attendance: 11,300; Referee: Gylfi Þór Orrason (Iceland)
Note: FCB without Cantaluppi, Disseris (both recovering from injury), Olsen (injured), and Müller (not yet eligible to play). Karlsruhe without Hässler (still on vacation).

15 July 1995 Round 4	Aarhus GF (Denmark)	2–1	(Switzerland) Basel	Aarhus Idrætspark, Aarhus
17:00	Jokovic 7' (1:0); Piechnik 35' (2:0)	FCB summary	78' (2:1) Yakin; (yellow card) 89' Tabakovic	Attendance: 1,600; Referee: Timo Keltanen (Finland)
Note: FCB without the injured Olsen, Cantaluppi, and Moser. Only three players on the bench: reserve goalkeeper Grüter, youth striker Schreiber and Suter. 41st minute: A shot from Zuffi hit the post.

==== League table ====
Pos	Team	Pld	W	D	L	GF	GA	GD	Pts	Qualification
1	(Germany) Karlsruhe	4	3	1	0	13	4	+9	10	Advanced to round of 16
2	(England) Sheffield Wednesday	4	2	1	1	7	5	+2	7	
3	(Switzerland) Basel	4	2	0	2	6	6	0	6	
4	(Denmark) Aarhus GF	4	2	0	2	7	8	−1	6	
5	(Poland) Górnik Zabrze	4	0	0	4	5	15	−10	0	

Source: rsssf.com

== See also ==
- History of FC Basel
- List of FC Basel players
- List of FC Basel seasons

== Sources ==
- Rotblau: Jahrbuch Saison 2015/2016. Publisher: FC Basel Marketing AG. ISBN 978-3-7245-2050-4
- Die ersten 125 Jahre / 2018. Publisher: Josef Zindel im Friedrich Reinhardt Verlag, Basel. ISBN 978-3-7245-2305-5
- The FCB squad 1995–96 at fcb-archiv.ch
- 1995–96 at Joggeli.ch
- 1995–96 at RSSSF
