= 1994–95 FC Basel season =

FC Basel
1994–95 season
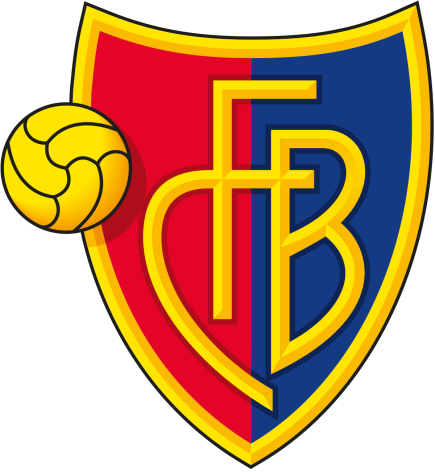
- Club president: Peter Epting
- Head coach: Claude Andrey
- Ground: St. Jakob Stadium, Basel
- Nationalliga A: Qualifying 7th of 12
- Championship group: 7th of 8
- Swiss Cup: Round 5
- Top goalscorer: League: Dario Zuffi (9); All: Dario Zuffi (11)
- Highest home attendance: 28,000 on 1 April 1995 vs Grasshopper Club
- Lowest home attendance: 6,500 on 31 May 1995 vs Xamax and on 13 June 1995 vs Aarau
- Average home league attendance: 14,600

The Fussball Club Basel 1893 1994–95 season was their 102nd season since the club's foundation. Peter Epting was the club's chairman for the third period. FC Basel played their home games in the St. Jakob Stadium. Following their promotion in the previous season this was their first season back in the highest tier of Swiss football.

== Overview ==
=== Pre-season ===
Claude Andrey was the Basel trainer for the second consecutive season. After gaining promotion during the previous season, the club's priority aim was to remain in the top flight of Swiss football. Andrey tried to keep the team together after the team's promotion and only a relatively low number of players left the squad. Axel Kruse's loan period had ended and he returned to VfB Stuttgart and Sergei Derkach returned to Dynamo Moscow. Reto Baumgartner retired from active football and turned to professional beach soccer and played for the Swiss national team. Micha Rahmen and Mario Uccella moved on to local amateur club FC Riehen, and Olivier Bauer and Frank Wittmann moved on to local team Old Boys.

In the other direction Lars Olsen signed in from Seraing, Asif Šarić signed in from Arminia Bielefeld, Mart van Duren came from Groningen and Alexandre Rey transferred in from Sion. A few youngsters also joined the team, Dominic Moser came from FC Birsfelden and Yassine Douimi, Markus Lichtsteiner and Roger Schreiber came via the reserve team from the youth section.

Two further youngsters joined the team during the winter break. Because Goalkeeper Stefan Huber was injured, Andreas Niederer was signed in as third goalie from local amateur club FC Allschwil and he came to four appearances after second keeper Thomas Grüter also injured himself. Hakan Yakin signed his first professional contract in January 1995 coming in from local club Concordia Basel. He played his League debut for Basel on 12 April 1995 in the match against Lausanne Sports. He was brought on in the 60th minute as replacement for Alexandre Rey. With his first touch of the ball, just 18 seconds later, Yakin scored the goal with a header to make it 3–0, the final score being 5–0.

=== Domestic league ===
At this time, the Swiss Football Association were reforming the Swiss football league system. There was no amendment to the top-tier (NLA), but the number of second-tier (NLB) clubs was being reduced from 24 teams in two regional groups to just 12 teams in one division and this was being done in three steps over three seasons. The previous season had seen the first step, with the reduction of the two regional divisions from 12 to 10 teams. This season saw the second step, the NLB had two groups of 8 and next season there would be one division with 12 teams.

As aleady noted, FCB had achieved promotion im the previous season. The 1994–95 Nationalliga A was contested by 12 teams and for Basel the season started very badly, the team lost four of the first six games and they did not record a win until the 9th round. After the first half of the Qualifying Phase, Basel and Young Boys were joint bottom of the league table with just six points. During their eleven games Basel had suffered six defeats and four draws. To this point they had scored just six goals, four of which were in the home win against Luzern, but had conceded only nine. The second half of the Qualifying Phase was better and Basel rose to 7th position in the league table. During the entire phase Basel scored just 18 goals, thus being the poorest attacking team and conceded just 15, thus being the defensive best in the league.

Basel were qualified for the Champions Round. Here things started better, three wins in the first three games. But two back to back dubbings in Lugano (1–4) as guests to Xamax (1–5), as well as the return game home defeat against Lugano, put an end to the hopes of a higher placed finish. Basel ended the 1994–95 Nationalliga A in seventh position in the table, but were qualified for the newly UEFA-administered Intertoto Cup 1995. Dario Zuffi was the team's top goal scorer with nine goals and Alexandre Rey second with five.

=== Swiss Cup ===
In the Swiss Cup Basel were drawn away from home against lower tier FC Bözingen 34 in the 3rd principal round. This resulted in a 5–0 victory, Philippe Hertig scored a brace. In the 4th round Basel faced Aarau at home in the St. Jakob Stadium and won 3–0. In the round of 16 Basel played in the Stadion Allmend but lost 0–2 to the hosts Luzern. Sion became cup winners, beating Grasshopper Club 4–2 in the final.

== Players ==
Note: Flags indicate national team as defined under FIFA eligibility rules; some limited exceptions apply. Players may hold more than one non-FIFA nationality.

No.	Pos.	Nation	Player
1	GK	SUI	Stefan Huber
2	DF	SUI	Massimo Ceccaroni
3	DF	SUI	Marco Walker
4	DF	BIH	Samir Tabakovic
5	DF	DEN	Lars Olsen (from Seraing)
5	MF	SUI	Martin Jeitziner
6	MF	SUI	Andre Meier
7	FW	SUI	Philippe Hertig
8	MF	BIH	Admir Smajić
9	FW	SUI	Dario Zuffi
10	MF	SUI	Mario Cantaluppi
11	FW	SUI	Alexandre Rey (from Sion)

No.	Pos.	Nation	Player
12	MF	SUI	Didier Gigon
13	MF	SUI	Dominic Moser (from FC Birsfelden)
14	DF	SUI	Ralph Steingruber
15	MF	BIH	Asif Šarić (from Arminia Bielefeld)
16	MF	SUI	Hakan Yakin (from Concordia Basel in January)
—	GK	SUI	Thomas Grüter
—	GK	SUI	Andreas Niederer (from FC Allschwil)
—	GK	SUI	Yves Matthey-Doret (from youth team)
—	DF	FRA	Yassine Douimi (Reserves)
—	DF	SUI	Markus Lichtsteiner (Reserves)
—	DF	SUI	Thomas Karrer (loan to Grenchen from March)
—	FW	SUI	Roger Schreiber (Reserves)
—	FW	NED	Mart van Duren (from Groningen)

Players who left the squad

Note: Flags indicate national team as defined under FIFA eligibility rules; some limited exceptions apply. Players may hold more than one non-FIFA nationality.

No.	Pos.	Nation	Player
—	DF	SUI	Olivier Bauer (to Old Boys)
—	DF	SUI	Reto Baumgartner (Retired)
—	DF	SUI	Marc Küpfer
—	DF	SUI	Micha Rahmen (to FC Riehen)

No.	Pos.	Nation	Player
—	DF	ITA	Mario Uccella (to FC Riehen)
—	MF	HUN	Sergei Derkach (to Dynamo Moscow)
—	FW	GER	Axel Kruse (end of loan from VfB Stuttgart)
—	MF	GER	Frank Wittmann (to Old Boys)
—		SUI	Cedric Jakob (to reserves)

== Results ==
Legend

Win Draw Loss Postponed

=== Friendly matches ===
==== Pre- and mid-season ====
29 June 1994 Pre-season; Exhibition game	Basel (Switzerland)	2–1	(Switzerland) Wil	Unter Reben, Zeiningen
19:00	Rey 6' (1:0); Gigon 14' (2:0)	FCB summary	51' (2:1) Baur	Attendance: 780; Referee: (Switzerland) Roman Ullmann
Note: FCB without Cantaluppi, Ceccaroni, Smajic and Grüter (all rested or recovering).

3 July 1994 Pre-season; Exhibition game	Luzern (Switzerland)	0–1	(Switzerland) Basel	Moos, Wauwil
16:30		FCB summary	65' (0:1) Zuffi	Attendance: 1,000; Referee: (Switzerland) Marti
Note: FCB without Cantaluppi, Smajic, Ceccaroni (all rested), Schreiber (injured).

6 July 1994 Pre-season; Exhibition game	Old Boys (Switzerland)	0–13	(Switzerland) Basel	Stadion Schützenmatte, Basel
20:00		FCB summary	9' (0:1) Rey; 13' (0:2) Rey; 17' (0:3) Moser; 21' (0:4) Šarić; 33' (0:5) Rey; 37' (0:6) Jeitziner; 42' (0:7) Rey; 46' (0:8) Gigon; 64' (0:9) Steingruber; 73' (0:10) Walker; 74' (0:11) Hertig; 82' (0:12) Hertig; 87' (0:13) Hertig	Attendance: 1,400; Referee: (Netherlands) Pieter Vink
Note: OB without Paul, Bernauer, Fratianni, Varano and Ugazio. FCB without Zuffi, Cantaluppi, Smajic, Ceccaroni, Grüter.

9 July 1994 Pre-season; Exhibition game	1. FC Kaiserslautern (Germany)	1–1	(Switzerland) Basel	Hördt
17:00	Haber 4' (1:0)	FCB summary	62' (pen. 1:1) Jeitziner	Attendance: 2,000; Referee: (Switzerland) Grobs
Note: Kaiserslautern were without Nowak, Sforza, Kadlec, Marschall, Brehme, Kuntz, and Wagner. FCB without Smajic, Ceccaroni, and Cantaluppi.A fair game played in high temperatures.

12 July 1994 Sepione Cup semi-final	Basel (Switzerland)	0–0 (4–3 p)	Zürich	Sportplatz Moos, Balsthal
19:30	Tabakovic (yellow card) 90'	FCZ summary FCB summary		Attendance: 1,600; Referee: (Switzerland) Serge Muhmenthaler (Grenchen)
	Penalties
	Hertig (penalty scored); Rey (penalty scored); Meier (penalty scored); Walker (penalty missed); Cantaluppi (penalty scored)		(penalty missed) Škoro; (penalty missed) Şahin; (penalty scored) Heydecker; (penalty scored) Casamento; (penalty scored) Mazzarelli
Note: FCB without Smajic, Ceccaroni, Steingruber and Grüter. FCZ without Studer and Baldassari. The Sempione Cup was a club tournament played in summer at Sportanlage Moos, Balsthal, during the years 1987 to 2004.

16 July 1994 Sepione Cup final	Basel (Switzerland)	1–1 (4–5 p)	(Switzerland) Aarau	Moos, Balsthal
20:00	Olsen (yellow card) 23'; Steingruber 81' (1:1)	FCB summary	27' (0:1) Fink; (yellow card) 42' Bader; (yellow card) 55' Mazenauer; (yellow card) 61' Heldmann; (yellow card) 72' Studer; (yellow card) 90+1' Christ	Attendance: 2,100; Referee: (Switzerland) Kurt Zuppinger (Bremgarten, Aargau)
	Penalties
	Rey (penalty scored); Steingruber (penalty missed); Walker (penalty scored); Cantaluppi (penalty scored); Zuffi (penalty scored); Gigon (penalty missed)		(penalty scored) Skrzypczak; (penalty missed) Kucharski; (penalty scored) Heldmann; (penalty scored) Burri; (penalty scored) Mazenauer; (penalty scored) Hoehener
Note: FCB were without Grüter, Ceccaroni, Jeitziner and Smajic (all injured). FCA were without Bühlmann (injured). The Sempione Cup was a club tournament played in summer at Sportanlage Moos, Balsthal, during the years 1987 to 2004.

20 July 1994 Pre-season; Exhibition game	Sochaux (France)	1–0	(Switzerland) Basel	Stade Auguste Bonal, Montbéliard
20:00	Croci (yellow card) 14'; Blanc (yellow card) 51'; Cuervo 74' (1:0); Hellon (yellow card) 86'	FCB summary	(yellow card) 8' Tabakovic; (yellow card) 59' Šarić	Attendance: 1,500; Referee: (France) Jérôme Goulu
Note: Sochaux without Voss. FCB without Smajic, Steingruber and Ceccaroni (injured, recovering).

30 July 1994 Pre-season; Exhibition game	Basel (Switzerland)	2–3	(Spain) Real Madrid	St. Jakob Stadium, Basel
20:00	Gigon 31' (1:1); Hertig 89' (2:3)	FCB summary	21' (0:1) Alfonso; (yellow card) 42' Chendo; 69' (1:2) Zamorano; 76' (1:3) Dubovský	Attendance: 8,000; Referee: (Switzerland) Kurt Röthlisberger (Suhr)
Note: FCB were without Smajic (injured), Zuffi and Rey (both slightly injured, being rested). Real Madrid were without Hierro and Luis Enrique (both still on holiday after the World Cup).

15 September 1994 Mid-season; Exhibition game	Basel (Switzerland)	5–0	(Switzerland) Basel U-21	St. Jakob Stadium, Basel
	Cantaluppi (1:0); Zuffi (2:0) van Duren (3:0); Zuffi (4:0); Cantaluppi (pen.)	FCB summary		Attendance: 100; Referee: (Switzerland) Rieder

==== Winter break and mid-season ====
25 January 1995 Winter break Exhibition game	Basel (Switzerland)	2–1	(Switzerland) Basel U-21	Landhof, Basel
16:00	van Duren 3' (1:0); Jeitziner 47' (pen. 2:1)	FCB summary	12' (1:1) Lepore	Attendance: 30; Referee: (Switzerland) Kurt Lutz

28 January 1994 Winter break Exhibition game	Servette (Switzerland)	2–2	(Switzerland) Basel	Stade Municipal (Sand), Vernier
14:30	Gjurovski 29' (1:0); Gjurovski (yellow card) 78'; Sesa 87' (2:2)	FCB summary	67' (1:1) Moser; 73' (1:2) Meier	Attendance: 400; Referee: (Switzerland) Marti
Note: Servette were missing Pascolo, Weiler (both national team), Mild, Juarez, Margarini and Sauthier, while FCB were missing Huber, Olsen, Rey (all injured) and Gigon (recovering from flu).

1 February 1995 Winter break Exhibition game	Luxembourg	1–1	(Switzerland) Basel	Op Flohr Stadion Grevenmacher, Luxembourg
19:45	Schneider 57' (1:0)	FCB summary	(yellow card) 41' Steingruber; (yellow card) 66' Smajić; 66' (1:1) Zuffi	Attendance: 300; Referee: (Luxembourg) Charles Schaack
Note: Luxembourg fielded only Saibene (Monthey) and Langers (Eintracht Trier) of their foreign players, but not Hellers (Standard Liège) and Strasser (FC Metz). FC Basel were without the injured Olsen and Rey, and goalkeeper Huber was on the bench due to a thigh strain. Hakan Yakin was absent due to vocational school.

4 February 1995 Winter break Exhibition game	Basel (Switzerland)	1–4	(Germany) SC Freiburg	St. Jakob Stadium, Basel
15:30	Cantaluppi 18' (1:1)	FCB summary	4' (0:1) Cardoso; 39' (1:2) Todt; 50' (1:3) Wassmer; (yellow card) 73' Sundermann; 83' (1:4) Zeyer	Attendance: 6,500; Referee: (Switzerland) Kurt Zuppinger (Bremgarten, Aargau)
Note: FCB without the injured Olsen, Tabakovic, Steingruber and Karrer.

8 February 1995 Winter break Exhibition game	Basel (Switzerland)	4–2	(Switzerland) Young Boys	Athletics stadium, Basel
17:00	Rey 27' (1:0); Walker 45' (2:0); Yakin 67' (3:0); Walker 85' (4:1)	FCB summary	(yellow card) 46' Tetteh; 80' (3:1) Sutter; 87' (4:2) Sutter	Attendance: 400; Referee: (Switzerland) Dieter Schoch (Attiswil)
Note: FCB without Huber, Olsen and Tabakovic, Smajic on the bench as a precaution.

12 February 1995 Winter break Exhibition game	Basel (Switzerland)	1–3	(Germany) VfB Stuttgart	St. Jakob Stadium, Basel
14:30	Hertig 84' (1:3)	FCB summary	23' (0:1) Kruse; 64' (0:2) Schneider; 76' (0:3) Schneider	Attendance: 5,000; Referee: (Switzerland) Marcel Vollenweider (Rüti, Zürich)
Note: FCB were without Jeitziner, Olsen, and van Duren; VfB Stuttgart were without Poschner, Strunz, Schäfer, and Buck. Due to a breakdown of the VfB team bus on the way to the match, kickoff was delayed by 20 minutes.

18 February 1995 Winter break Exhibition game	SR Delémont (Switzerland)	2–3	(Switzerland) Basel	La Blancherie, Delémont
14:30	Vukic 30' (1:0); Maillard (yellow card) 38'; Varga (yellow card) 41'; Vukic 43' (2:1)	FCB summary	35' (pen. 1:1) Smajić; 57' (2:2) Smajić; 74' (2:3) Steingruber	Attendance: 600; Referee: (Switzerland) Dieter Schoch (Attiswil)
Note: Delémont were without Marcolli (injured). FC Basel were without the injured Olsen and Jeitziner, as well as Hertig, Saric, and Yakin, who will be suspended for Sunday's match in Aarau.

25 March 1995 Mid-season; Exhibition game	Basel (Switzerland)	2–2	(Switzerland) Super 11	St. Jakob Stadium, Basel
18:30	Smajić 78' (1:2); Yakin 81' (2:2)	FCB summary	30' (0:1) Kucharski; 48' (0:2) Kucharski	Attendance: 2,100; Referee: (Switzerland) Kurt Röthlisberger (Suhr, Aargau)
Note: A benefit match for Norberto Cesar. FC Basel were without Zuffi, Moser, and Cantaluppi, who were rested for the national team or the U21 squad. Meier (torn thumb ligaments) and Rey (shoulder injury) were forced off injured.

21 April 1995 Mid-season; Exhibition game	Basel (Switzerland)	0–2	(France) RC Strasbourg	St. Jakob Stadium, Basel
19:00		FCB summary	12' (0:1) Gravelaine; 67' (0:2) Regis	Attendance: 1,100; Referee: (Switzerland) Andreas Schluchter (Schönenbuch)
Note: FC Basel were without the injured or rested Huber, Smajic, Olsen, and Meier, as well as Walker and Zuffi (national team). RC Strasbourg were without goalkeeper Vencel (Slovak national team) and Mostowoi (Russian national team).

=== Nationalliga A ===
==== Qualifying Phase ====
27 July 1994 Round 1	Basel	0–1	Lugano	St. Jakob Stadium, Basel
20:00	Walker (yellow card) 6'; Cantaluppi (yellow card) 18'; Jeitziner (yellow card) 77'	FCB summary	(yellow card) 6' Carrasco; (yellow card) 14' Morf; 74' (0:1) Manfreda; (yellow card) 81' (yellow-red card) 90+1' Esposito	Attendance: 16,500; Referee: (Switzerland) Urs Meier (Wettingen and Würenlos)
Note: FC Basel were without the recovering Ceccaroni and Smajic, as well as Saric (not yet eligible to play). Lugano were without the injured Guerchadi and Gentizon.

3 August 1994 Round 2	Lausanne-Sport	2–1	Basel	La Pontaise, Lausanne
20:00	Pister (yellow card) 21'; Biaggi (yellow card) 41'; Pister (yellow card) 66'; Käslin 70' (1:0); La Placa 90' (2:0)	FCB summary	(yellow card) 27' Cantaluppi; (yellow card) 66' Šarić; (yellow card) 20' (yellow-red card) 87' Ceccaroni; 90+2' (2:1) Zuffi	Attendance: 6,500; Referee: (Switzerland) Jürg Herrmann (Hinterkapplen (Wohlen bei Bern))
Note: Lausanne noch ohne den gesperrten Sogbie und ohne den verletzten Poulard. FCB ohne die verletzten Smajic und Steingruber.

6 August 1994 Round 3	Zürich	0–0	Basel	Letzigrund, Zürich
20:00	J. Studer (yellow card) 36'	FCZ summary FCB summaey	(yellow card) 66' Rey	Attendance: 12,000; Referee: (Switzerland) Kurt Röthlisberger (Suhr, Aargau)
Note: FCZ without the injured Baldassari. FCB without the injured Smajic, Steingruber, and Olsen, as well as the suspended Ceccaroni. First National League appearance for FCB youth player Thierry Schmitt. Approximately 5,000 FCB supporters among the spectators.

13 August 1994 Round 4	Basel	0–0	St. Gallen	St. Jakob Stadium, Basel
20:00	Walker (yellow card) 33'; Gigon (yellow card) 33'; Tabakovic (yellow card) 74'	FCB summary	(yellow card) 18' Tejeda; (yellow card) 41' Koch; (yellow card) 61' Allaou; (yellow card) 81' Lütte	Attendance: 13,500; Referee: (Switzerland) Freddy Philippoz (Sion)
Note: FCB without the injured Smajic and Olsen, with Steingruber back in the squad for the first time after a rib fracture. St. Gallen without the injured Gertschen and Mouidi, the suspended Wanner, and Tiefenbach (an extra foreign player). The pitch, where any remained after the stadium concerts, was in a deplorable state.

20 August 1994 Round 5	Xamax	1–0	Basel	Stade de la Maladière (1924), Neuchâtel
20:00	Détári 7' (1:0); Perret (yellow card) 26'; Ivanov (yellow card) 47' (yellow-red card) 59'; Aleksandrov (yellow card) 75'	FCB summary	(yellow card) 52' Ceccaroni; (yellow card) 57' Meier	Attendance: 15,200; Referee: (Switzerland) Werner Müller (Obererlinsbach)
Note: Xamax without Adriano (extra foreign player); FCB without the ill Gigon and without the injured Smajic, Olsen, Grüter, Schreiber, and Lichtsteiner. Corners: 4-6. Excellent referee. Large police presence (no incidents).

27 August 1994 Round 6	Basel	0–2	Grasshopper Club	St. Jakob Stadium, Basel
20:00	Jeitziner (yellow card) 28'	FCB summary	30' (0:1) Koller; (yellow card) 63' Thüler; (yellow card) 64' (yellow-red card) 74' Gren; (yellow card) 66' Bickel; 80' (0:2) de Napoli	Attendance: 19,508; Referee: (Switzerland) Michel Zen-Ruffinen
Note: FCB without Smaiic and Grüter, GC without Subiat (all injured).

31 August 1994 Round 7	Aarau	0–0	Basel	Stadion Brügglifeld, Aarau
20:00	Fink (yellow card) 8'; Ratinho (yellow card) 83'	FCB summary FCA summary	(yellow card) 44' Olsen; (yellow card) 56' Šarić; (yellow card) 57' Jeitziner	Attendance: 7,400; Referee: (Switzerland) Kurt Zuppinger (Bremgarten, Aargau)
Note: FCA without Hediger, Höhener and Mazenauer, FCB without Tabakovic, Smajic and Grüter (all injured). A confused, inconsistent referee.

3 September 1994 Round 8	Servette	0–0	Basel	Charmilles Stadium, Geneva
20:00	Margarini (yellow card) 43'; Carioca (yellow card) 54'	FCB summary	(yellow card) 84' Rey	Attendance: 5,100; Referee: (Liechtenstein) Roland Beck (Triesenberg)
Note: Servette were without the injured Aeby, Duchosal, Neuville, and Sauthier. FC Basel were without the injured Smajic and the suspended Jeitziner. A good (calm, objective) referee.

10 September 1994 Round 9	Basel	4–0	Luzern	St. Jakob Stadium, Basel
20:00	Hertig 18' (1:0); Walker 26' (2:0); Gigon (yellow card) 39'; Šarić 45+1' (3:0); Walker (yellow card) 68'; Šarić 81' (4:0)	FCB summary	(yellow card) 25' Renggli; (yellow card) 45' Camenzind; (yellow card) 61' Karpf; (yellow card) 84' Jost	Attendance: 17,500; Referee: (Switzerland) Marcel Vollenweider (Rüti, Zürich)
Note: FC Basel were without the injured Smajlc, Rey, and Jeitziner. Lucerne were without Schällbaum, Nadig, Minell (all injured), Bertelsen (ill), and Gerstenmájer (not in the squad). The referee's performance was satisfactory.

17 September 1994 Round 10	Young Boys	1–0	Basel	Wankdorf Stadium, Bern
20:00	Baumann (yellow card) 42'; Lengen (yellow card) 55'; Aduobe 82' (1:0)	FCB summary	(yellow card) 87' Zuffi	Attendance: 9,900; Referee: (Switzerland) Kurt Röthlisberger (Suhr, Aargau)
Note: YB were without Hartmann and Pagano (injured). FCB were without Jeitziner and Smajic (both injured) and without Walker (suspended).

21 September 1994 Round 11	Basel	1–2	Sion	St. Jakob-Park, Basel
20:00	Rey 87' (1:2)	FCB summary	48' (0:1) Herr; 84' (0:2) Assis	Attendance: 11,000; Referee: (Switzerland) Hans Müller (Bern)
Note: FCB were without Smajic (injured). FC Sion were without Milton, Quentin, Lonfat (all injured) and Orlando (suspended).

3 October 1994 Round 12	Lugano	1–1	Basel	Cornaredo, Lugano
14:30	Sinval 3' (1:1); Galvão (yellow card) 54'; Esposito (yellow card) 80'	FCB summary	2' (0:1) van Duren	Attendance: 4,200; Referee: (Switzerland) Urs Meier (Wettingen and Würenlos)
Note: FC Lugano were without the injured Colombo, Guerchadi, Pelosi and Gantizon. FC Basel were without Smajic (recovering) and Zuffi (who suffered a cervical spine injury in a collision with Huber during Saturday's final training session).

5 October 1994 Round 13	Basel	2–1	Lausanne-Sport	St. Jakob-Park, Basel
20:00	Walker 54' (1:1); Ceccaroni (yellow card) 86'; Walker 90' (2:1)	FCB summary	26' (0:1) La Placa; (yellow card) 50' di Jorio; (yellow card) 78' Comisetti	Attendance: 9,000; Referee: (Switzerland) Kurt Röthlisberger (Suhr, Aargau)
Note: FCB ohne Smajic (verletzt), Lausanne komplett

15 October 1994 Round 14	Basel	0–0	Zürich	St. Jakob-Park, Basel
20:00	Cantaluppi (yellow card) 34'; Meier (yellow card) 61'	FCB summary FCZ summary	(yellow card) 28' Hodel; (yellow card) 46' Kägi; (yellow card) 88' Favre	Attendance: 25,000; Referee: (Switzerland) Michel Zen-Ruffinen
Note: FCB were without Jeitziner (injured) and Saric (suspended). Zuff was substituted at halftime with a thigh strain resulting from a foul by Hodel. FCZ were without the injured Baldassari, Casamento, Mazzarelli, and Studer, as well as the suspended Skoro.

22 October 1994 Round 15	St. Gallen	0–3	Basel	Espenmoos, St. Gallen
20:00	Winkler (yellow card) 50'; Allaoui (yellow card) 72'	FCB summary	18' (0:1) Rey; (yellow card) 35' Ceccaroni; (yellow card) 42' Hertig; (yellow card) 58' Zuffi; 59' (0:2) Zuffi; (yellow card) 65' Jeitziner; 85' (0:3) Zuffi; (yellow card) 82' Šarić	Attendance: 10,200; Referee: (Switzerland) Hans Müller (Bern)
Note: FC St. Gallen were without Gertschen and Lütte (both injured), Tiefenbach (extra foreign player), and still without Charles Wlttl, who is on loan from Xamax until the end of the year but will only be eligible to play against FC Zurich on Wednesday. FC Basel were without Cantaluppl (suspended). Huber had to leave the field in the 74th minute after a foul by Allaoul, suffering facial injuries, and was taken to hospital for stitches.

26 October 1994 Round 16	Basel	0–0	Xamax	St. Jakob-Park, Basel
20:00	Rey (yellow card) 55'; Jeitziner (yellow card) 67'; Zuffi (yellow card) 70'	FCB summary	(yellow card) 20' Jeanneret; (yellow card) 60' Perret	Attendance: 12,000; Referee: (Switzerland) Claude Detruche, (Thônex)
Note: FCB without Huber, van Duren (injured), Ceccaroni (suspended). Xamax without Rothenbühler (injured).

30 October 1994 Round 17	Grasshopper Club	0–3	Basel	Hardturm, Zürich
14:30	Yakin (yellow card) 23'	FCB summary	57' (0:1) Cantaluppi; (yellow card) 62' Smajić; (yellow card) 76' Šarić; 81' (0:2) Cantaluppi; 85' (0:3) Steingruber	Attendance: 10,100; Referee: (Switzerland) Urs Meier (Wettingen and Würenlos)
Note: GC without Lombardo (injured). FCB without Zuffi, Rey (both suspended), Huber, Matthey-Doret and van Duren (injured).

5 November 1994 Round 18	Basel	0–2	Aarau	St. Jakob Stadium, Basel
17:30	Smajić (yellow card) 22'	FCB summary FCA summary	(yellow card) 44' Bühlmann; (yellow card) 60' Pavličević; (yellow card) 62' Wyss; 75' (0:1) Ratinho; 87' (0:2) Ratinho	Attendance: 14,000; Referee: (Switzerland) Serge Muhmenthaler (Grenchen)
Note: FCB without Van Duren (injured); FCA without Heidmann (ill) and Hediger (injured).

9 November 1994 Round 19	Basel	2–1	Servette	St. Jakob Stadium, Basel
20:00	Zuffi 18' (1:0); Zuffi 73' (2:0)	FCB summary	(yellow card) 20' Barea; (yellow card) 72' Juárez; 78' (2:1) Eklund	Attendance: 8,500; Referee: (Switzerland) Hans Müller (Bern)
Note: FCB were without Smajic (pain). Servette were without the suspended Moro and the injured Sauthier, Schepull, Duchosal, Mild, and Weiler. 47th minute, A goal from FCB defender Walker was disallowed for offside.

19 November 1994 Round 20	Luzern	0–1	Basel	Stadion Allmend Luzern
17:30	Gmür (yellow card) 15'; Renggli (yellow card) 58'	FCB summary	(yellow card) 17' Walker; (yellow card) 45' Hertig; 66' (0:1) Olsen; (yellow card) 78' van Duren	Attendance: 11,200; Referee: (Switzerland) Urs Meier (Wettingen and Würenlos)
Note: FCL without Bertelsen, Camenzind, Minelli (injured) and Gerstenmájer (not in the squad). FCB were without Smajic (injured).

27 November 1994 Round 21	Basel	0–1	Young Boys	St. Jakob Stadium, Basel
14:30		FCB summary	10' (0:1) Hartmann; (yellow card) 15' Hartmann; (yellow card) 39' Christensen; (yellow card) 70' Neqrouz; (yellow card) 87' Ippoliti	Attendance: 23,000; Referee: (Switzerland) Daniel Roduit (Sion)
Note: FCB without Smajic (injured) and Saric (surplus). YB without Langen (injured).

4 December 1994 Round 22	Sion	0–0	Basel	Stade Tourbillon, Sion
14:30	Assis (yellow card) 45'	FCB summary	(yellow card) 25' (yellow-red card) 35' Hertig; (yellow card) 71' Šarić	Attendance: 10,500; Referee: (Switzerland) Werner Müller (Obererlinsbach)
Note: Sion were without Quentin, Lonfat, Milton and Geiger (injured or rested). FCB were without Smajic, Zuffi and van Duren (all injured).

==== League table ====
Pos	Team	Pld	W	D	L	GF	GA	GD	Pts	Qualification
1	Grasshopper Club	22	13	5	4	36	21	+15	31	Advance to championship round halved points (rounded up) as bonus
2	AC Lugano	22	8	9	5	30	17	+13	25	Advance to championship round halved points (rounded up) as bonus
3	Aarau	22	8	9	5	34	22	+12	25	Advance to championship round halved points (rounded up) as bonus
4	Xamax	22	9	6	7	33	31	+2	24	Advance to championship round halved points (rounded up) as bonus
5	Lausanne-Sport	22	8	8	6	34	35	−1	24	Advance to championship round halved points (rounded up) as bonus
6	Sion	22	10	3	9	32	37	−5	23	Advance to championship round halved points (rounded up) as bonus
7	Basel	22	6	8	8	18	15	+3	20	Advance to championship round halved points (rounded up) as bonus
8	Luzern	22	7	6	9	22	31	−9	20	Advance to championship round halved points (rounded up) as bonus
9	Zürich	22	4	11	7	23	27	−4	19	Continue to promotion/relegation round
10	Servette	22	6	6	10	26	31	−5	18	Continue to promotion/relegation round
11	St. Gallen	22	4	10	8	20	28	−8	18	Continue to promotion/relegation round
12	Young Boys	22	6	5	11	24	37	−13	17	Continue to promotion/relegation round

Source: rsssf.com
Rules for classification: 1) Points; 2) Goal difference; 3) Goals scored; 4) Head-to-head points; 5) Away goals scored; 6) Draw.

==== Champions Group ====
26 February 1995 Round 1	Aarau	0–1	Basel	Stadion Brügglifeld, Aarau
14:30		FCB summary FCA summary	(yellow card) 16' Ceccaroni; 90' (0:1) Zuffi	Attendance: 9,300; Referee: (Switzerland) Serge Muhmenthaler (Grenchen)
Note: FCA were without Heldmann, Markovic (both injured), Kucharski, and Pavlicevic (both suspended). FCB were without Jeitziner (injured), Rey (fell ill with a 40-degree fever on Sunday night), Hertig, Saric, and Yakin (all suspended). First National League appearance for Moser (formerly of Birsfelden). Position changes after halftime: Moser in midfield, Smajic in attack. The pitch was in relatively good playing condition. Around 4,500 Basel fans were in attendance. A confident performance from referee Muhmenthaler and his linesmen.

5 March 1995 Round 2	Basel	3–1	Sion	St. Jakob Stadium, Basel
14:30	Moser 7' (1:0); Walker 43' (2:0); Meier (yellow card) 56'; Hertig 78' (3:1)	FCB summary	(yellow card) 30' Fournier; 73' (2:1) Kunz	Attendance: 14,000; Referee: (Switzerland) Kurt Röthlisberger (Suhr, Aargau)
Note: FCB ohne Saric und Yakin (beide gesperrt), Smajic (Leistenzerrung) und Jeitziner (Knöchelverstauchung), Rey (rekonvaleszent, nach Mumps unter den Zuschauern). Sion ohne die verletzten Quentin und Karl. First National League goal for Moser.

12 March 1995 Round 3	Xamax	P–P	Basel	Stade de la Maladière (1924), Neuchâtel

1 April 1995 Round 4	Basel	1–0	Grasshopper Club	St. Jakob Stadium, Basel
20:00	Walker (yellow card) 31'; Tabakovic (yellow card) 76'; Walker 90+1'	FCB summary	(yellow card) 20' Gämperle	Attendance: 28,000; Referee: (Switzerland) Urs Meier (Wettingen and Würenlos)
Note: FC Basel fielded a full squad without injuries or suspensions, but without van Duren, Hakan Yakin, and Moser (not in the squad), with Grüter, Olsen, Steingruber, Jeitziner, and Rey on the bench. Grasshoppers were without the injured Murat Yakin, Kilian, and reserve goalkeeper Böckli (all injured).

8 April 1995 Round 5	Luzern	2–1	Basel	Stadion Allmend Luzern
20:00	Kurniawan 23' (1:0); Wolf 59' (2:0); Güntensperger (yellow card) 90+3'	FCB summary	(yellow card) 69' Tabakovic; (yellow card) 72' Cantaluppi; (red card) 68' Smajić; 77' (2:1) Hertig	Attendance: 16,500; Referee: (Switzerland) Werner Müller (Obererlinsbach)
Note: FCL without Tuce, Nadig, and Renggli (injured), Sawu (Zimbabwe national team, scored the opening goal in the 2-0 win against Lesotho), and Gmür (suspended). FCB without Yakln (U-18 international in Italy). Goalkeeper Huber suffered a concussion (80th minute) but finished the match, though he spent the night in a Lucerne hospital. 35th minute, Olsen left the field with a hamstring strain. Walker came on in the attack, with Saric at left-back. 27th minute, Güntensperger's header hit the crossbar. Between 6,000 and 7,000 Basel fans were in amongst the spectators.

12 April 1995 Round 6	Basel	5–0	Lausanne-Sport	St. Jakob Stadium, Basel
20:00	Zuffi 14' (pen. 1:0); Moser 45' (2:0); H. Yakin 61' (3:0); Moser 78' (4:0); Zuffi 90' (5:0)	FCB summary	(yellow card) 2' Savovic	Attendance: 15,000; Referee: (Switzerland) Claude Detruche (Thônex)
Note: FCB played without the injured Huber and Olsen, and without the suspended Smajic. Lausanne without the injured Nemtsoudis, Pister, Viret, and Sylvestre. 5th minute, goal from Moser was disallowed due to a foul. Meier cleared goals off the line from Käslin (56th minute) and Sogbie (90th minute). NLA debut for Hakan Yakin.

29 April 1995 Round 7	Lugano	4–1	Basel	Cornaredo, Lugano
17:30	Colombo 8' (1:0); Carrasco (yellow card) 10'; Manfreda 17' (2:0); Colombo 36' (3:0); Carrasco 56' (4:1)	FCB summary	55' (3:1) Tabakovic	Attendance: 4,500; Referee: (Switzerland) Werner Müller (Obererlinsbach)
Note: Lugano played without the injured Andrioli, Englund, and Belloni, as well as the suspended Penzavalli. FCB without the injured Huber and Olsen, as well as the suspended Smajic and Gigon. FCB made tactical changes after the break: Cantaluppi switched from the left to the right wing, Zuffi moved to left midfield, and Yakin replaced him in attack. 69th minute, goal from Yakin disallowed for offside. 81st minute, Cantaluppi's cross hit the post. An estimated 1,500 to 2,000 FCB supporters were in the stands (without any incidents).

2 May 1994 Round 3	Xamax	5–1	Basel	Stade de la Maladière (1924), Neuchâtel
20:00	Perret (yellow card) 33'; Piffaretti 57' (1:0); Vernier 66' (2:1); Aleksandrov 70' (3:1); Aleksandrov 77' (4:1); Aleksandrov 90' (5:1)	FCB summary	(yellow card) 19' Tabakovic; 62' (1:1) Rey; (yellow card) 67' H. Yakin	Attendance: 9,600; Referee: (Switzerland) Serge Muhmenthaler (Grenchen)
Note: Xamax without the injured Marcao and Rothenbühler, FCB without the injured Olsen and the suspended Huber.

6 May 1995 Round 8	Basel	1–2	Lugano	St. Jakob Stadium, Basel
17:30	Jeitziner (yellow card) 34'; H. Yakin 37' (1:1)	FCB summary	35' (0:1) Colombo; 90+1' (1:2) Sinval	Attendance: 12,500; Referee: (Switzerland) Daniel Roduit (Sion)
Note: FCB without Huber (injured), Gigon and Tabakovic (both injured), Lugano without Andrioli (injured) and Penzavalli (suspended).

13 May 1995 Round 9	Lausanne-Sport	0–1	Basel	Lla Pontaise, Lausanne
20:00	Savovic (yellow card) 74'	FCB summary	(yellow card) 12' Gigon; (yellow card) 33' Tabakovic; 53' (0:1) Rey; (yellow card) 88' Walker	Attendance: 2,000; Referee: (Switzerland) Jürg Herrmann (Hinterkapplen (Wohlen bei Bern))
Note: Lausanne without Comisetti, Käslin, Poulard (all injured) and Di Jorio (suspended). FCB without goalkeepers Huber and Grüter (both injured).

20 May 1995 Round 10	Basel	2–0	Luzern	St. Jakob Stadium, Basel
17:30	Zuffi 35' (1:0); H. Yakin (yellow card) 71'; H. Yakin 89' (2:0)	FCB summary	(yellow card) 50' Koch	Attendance: 13,800; Referee: (Switzerland) Urs Meier (Wettingen and Würenlos)
Note: FCB without injured goalkeepers Huber and Grüter, without the recovering Moser, and without Steingruber and van Duren (not in the squad). FCL without the injured Camenzind, Renggli, and Tuce, and without Den Kurniawan (Indonesian Olympic team). A minute's silence was observed, and the FC Basel players wore black armbands in memory of former FC Basel player René Bader.

27 May 1995 Round 11	Grasshopper Club	1–0	Basel	Hardturm, Zürich
20:00	Magnin 16' (1:0); Gämperle (yellow card) 30'; Koller (yellow card) 39'; Thüler (yellow card) 45'; Gren (yellow card) 62'; Vega (yellow card) 90+1'	FCB summary	(yellow card) 14' Olsen; (yellow card) 59' Zuffi	Attendance: 16,100; Referee: (Switzerland) Gottfried Friedrich (Seedorf, Uri)
Note: GC without the injured Subiat, Murat Yakin and Kilian, FCB without the injured goalkeepers Huber and Grüter, without the suspended Hakan Yakin as well as without Moser and van Duren (not in the squad).

31 May 1995 Round 12	Basel	1–2	Xamax	St. Jakob Stadium, Basel
20:00	Rey (yellow card) 3'; Gigon 62' (1:0)	FCB summary	(yellow card) 12' Henchoz; 79' (1:1) Aleksandrov; 85' (1:2) Gottardi	Attendance: 6,500; Referee: (Switzerland) Kurt Röthlisberger (Suhr, Aargau)
Note: FCB without the injured Huber, Grüter, Cantaluppi and Moser. Xamax were at full strength.

10 June 1995 Round 13	Sion	1–2	Basel	Stade Tourbillon, Sion
20:00	Milton 25' (1:0); Oggier (yellow card) 55'	FCB summary	31' (1:1) H. Yakin; (yellow card) 39' Huber; (yellow card) 41' Walker; 62' (1:2) Rey; (yellow card) 78' Rey	Attendance: 6,800; Referee: (Switzerland) Claude Detruche (Thônex)
Note: Sion without the suspended Orlando, the injured Lonfat, Wicky and Bonvin, as well as Geiger, Ouattara and Assis (not in the squad). FCB without Zuffi (on vacation), Steingruber (suspended), Grüter (on vacation/injured), Cantaluppi and Moser (both injured).

13 June 1995 Round 14	Basel	0–1	Aarau	St. Jakob Stadium, Basel
20:00		FCB summary	41' (0:1) Ratinho; (yellow card) 67' Christ	Attendance: 6,500; Referee: (Switzerland) Daniel Roduit
Note: Numerous honors before the match for: Rehorek, Fringer, Roduit, Jeitziner, Van Duren, Hertig, Saric, Niederer, Steingruber. FCB without Walker (suspended), Cantaluppi, Moser (injured), Zuffi (on vacation), Aarau without Gratwohl and Hediger (injured).

==== League table ====
Pos	Team	Pld	W	D	L	GF	GA	GD	BP	Pts	Qualification
1	Grasshopper Club	14	9	3	2	25	13	+12	16	37	Swiss champions, qualified for 1995–96 Champions League
2	Lugano	14	6	5	3	25	17	+8	13	30	qualified for 1995–96 UEFA Cup
3	Xamax	14	6	4	4	27	20	+7	12	28	qualified for 1995–96 UEFA Cup
4	Aarau	14	5	4	5	17	16	+1	13	27	entered 1995 UEFA Intertoto Cup
5	Luzern	14	5	5	4	14	18	−4	10	25	entered 1995 UEFA Intertoto Cup
6	Sion	14	5	2	7	24	25	−1	12	24	Swiss Cup winners, qualified for 1995–96 Cup Winners' Cup
7	Basel	14	7	0	7	20	19	+1	10	24	entered 1995 UEFA Intertoto Cup
8	Lausanne-Sport	14	1	1	12	11	35	−24	12	15	

Source: rsssf.com

=== Swiss Cup ===
25 September 1994 Round 3	FC Bözingen 34	0–5	Basel	Sportplatz Längfeld, Biel/Bienne
14:30	Born (yellow card) 42'; Gallo (yellow card) 44'	FCB summary	59' (0:1) Gigon; 66' (0:2) Hertig; 71' (0:3) Rey; 85' (0:4) Hertig; 90+3' (0:5) Zuffi	Attendance: 3,000; Referee: (Switzerland) Francis Fischer (Arch)
Note: Bözingen played the 1994/95 season in the 2. Liga (fourth-tier). Bözingen without Lütolf (suspended), Herzog and Aeberhard (both injured). FCB without Smajic (injured).

18 March 1995 Round 4	Basel	3–0	Aarau	St. Jakob Stadium, Basel
20:00	Zuffi 45' (1:0); Walker (yellow card) 85'; Hertig 86' (2:0); Šarić 88' (3:0)	FCB summary FCA summary	(yellow card) 72' Bader	Attendance: 12,000; Referee: (Switzerland) Kurt Zuppinger (Bremgarten, Aargau)
Note: FCB without Jeiztiner, Smajic (injured). FCA without Christ (suspended), Heldmann, Wyss (injured).

17 April 1995 Round 5	Luzern	2–0	Basel	Stadion Allmend, Luzern
17:00	Wolf 30' (1:0); Güntensperger 59' (2:0); Gmür (yellow card) 64'; Wyss (yellow card) 81'	FCB summary	(yellow card) 21' Meier; (yellow card) 54' Ceccaroni; (red card) 81' Gigon	Attendance: 22,500; Referee: (Switzerland) Gottfried Friedrich (Seedorf, Uri)
Note: FCL without the injured Tuce, Minelli, Nadlg and Renggli, FCB without the injured Huber and Olsen as well as the suspended Smajic. Around 8000 FCB fans traveled to the match.

== See also ==
- History of FC Basel
- List of FC Basel players
- List of FC Basel seasons

== Sources and references ==
- Rotblau: Jahrbuch Saison 2015/2016. Publisher: FC Basel Marketing AG. ISBN 978-3-7245-2050-4
- Die ersten 125 Jahre / 2018. Publisher: Josef Zindel im Friedrich Reinhardt Verlag, Basel. ISBN 978-3-7245-2305-5
- The FCB squad 1994–95 at fcb-archiv.ch
- 1994–95 at RSSSF
