= 1994–95 Stade Malherbe Caen season =

Stade Malherbe Caen
1994–95 season
- President: Serge Viard
- Head coach: Pierre Mankowski
- Stadium: Stade Michel d'Ornano
- French Division 1: 19th (relegated)
- Coupe de France: Round of 64
- Coupe de la Ligue: Round of 16
- Intertoto Cup: Group stage
- Top goalscorer: League: Amara Simba (13); All: Amara Simba (13)
- Biggest defeat: Rennes 5–0 Caen

The 1994–95 Stade Malherbe Caen season was the club's 82nd season in existence and the seventh consecutive season in the top flight of French football. In addition to the domestic league, Caen participated in this season's editions of the Coupe de France, the Coupe de la Ligue, and the Intertoto Cup.

== Competitions ==
=== Overview ===
Competition	First match	Last match	Starting round	Final position	Record							
Competition	First match	Last match	Starting round	Final position	Pld	W	D	L	GF	GA	GD	Win %
French Division 1	29 July 1994	31 May 1995	Matchday 1	19th	38	10	6	22	38	58	−20	26.32
Coupe de France	14 January 1995		Round of 64	Round of 64	1	0	0	1	1	3	−2	0.00
Coupe de la Ligue	3 January 1995	24 January 1995	Round of 32	Round of 16	2	1	0	1	4	3	+1	50.00
Intertoto Cup	3 July 1994	23 July 1994	Group stage	Group stage	4	0	3	1	5	6	−1	0.00
Total					45	11	9	25	48	70	−22	24.44

Source: Competitions

=== French Division 1 ===
==== League table ====
Pos	Team	Pld	W	D	L	GF	GA	GD	Pts	Qualification or relegation
16	Nice	38	11	10	17	39	52	−13	43	
17	Montpellier	38	9	14	15	38	53	−15	41	
18	Saint-Étienne	38	9	11	18	45	55	−10	38	Reprived from relegation (Note: Saint-Étienne were reprived from relegation due to Marseille's denied promotion from Division 2.)
19	Caen (R)	38	10	6	22	38	58	−20	36	Relegation to French Division 2
20	Sochaux (R)	38	6	5	27	29	68	−39	23	Relegation to French Division 2

Source: Ligue 1
Rules for classification: 1) points; 2) goal difference; 3) number of goals scored.
(R) Relegated

==== Results summary ====
Overall								Home						Away					
Pld	W	D	L	GF	GA	GD	Pts	W	D	L	GF	GA	GD	W	D	L	GF	GA	GD
38	10	6	22	38	58	−20	36	9	3	7	30	20	+10	1	3	15	8	38	−30

Source: French Division 1

==== Results by round ====
Round	1	2	3	4	5	6	7	8	9	10	11	12	13	14	15	16	17	18	19	20	21	22	23	24	25	26	27	28	29	30	31	32	33	34	35	36	37	38
Ground	A	H	A	H	A	H	A	H	A	A	H	A	H	A	H	A	H	A	H	A	H	A	H	A	H	A	H	H	A	H	A	H	A	H	A	H	A	H
Result	L	L	L	L	L	W	L	L	L	D	L	W	W	L	W	L	W	D	D	L	L	L	W	L	L	D	W	W	L	D	L	L	L	W	L	D	L	W
Position	20	20	19	19	20	19	20	20	20	20	20	20	19	20	18	18	17	18	17	18	18	19	17	19	19	19	19	17	18	18	19	19	19	19	19	19	19	19

Source: French Division 1
A = Away; H = Home; W = Win; D = Draw; L = Loss

==== Matches ====
29 July 1994 1	Sochaux	2–0	Caen	Montbéliard
20:00 CEST (UTC+2)	Mendy 83'; Cuervo 90+1'			Stadium: Stade Auguste Bonal; Attendance: 4,506; Referee: Stéphane Bré

2 August 1994 2	Caen	0–1	Cannes	Caen
20:00 CEST (UTC+2)			Micoud 30'	Stadium: Stade Michel d'Ornano; Attendance: 17,023; Referee: Georges Ramos

5 August 1994 3	Nantes	2–1	Caen	Nantes
20:00 CEST (UTC+2)	Ferri 35'; Ouédec 77'		Marraud 2' (o.g.)	Stadium: Stade de la Beaujoire; Attendance: 17,227; Referee: Antoine De Pandis

12 August 1994 4	Caen	0–1	Monaco	Caen
20:30 CEST (UTC+2)			Blondeau 26'	Stadium: Stade Michel d'Ornano; Attendance: 15,380; Referee: Pascal Garibian

20 August 1994 5	Bastia	1–0	Caen	Furiani
20:00 CEST (UTC+2)

27 August 1994 6	Caen	2–0	Metz	Caen
20:00 CEST (UTC+2)				Stadium: Stade Michel d'Ornano

31 August 1994 7	Lyon	1–0	Caen	Lyon
20:00 CEST (UTC+2)

10 September 1994 8	Caen	1–5	Auxerre	Caen
20:00 CEST (UTC+2)				Stadium: Stade Michel d'Ornano

17 September 1994 9	Strasbourg	1–0	Caen	Strasbourg
20:00 CEST (UTC+2)

23 September 1994 10	Lille	1–1	Caen	Lille
20:00 CEST (UTC+2)

1 October 1994 11	Caen	1–2	Paris Saint-Germain	Caen
20:00 CEST (UTC+2)				Stadium: Stade Michel d'Ornano

11 October 1994 12	Nice	0–1	Caen	Nice
20:00 CEST (UTC+2)

14 October 1994 13	Caen	1–0	Montpellier	Caen
20:00 CEST (UTC+2)				Stadium: Stade Michel d'Ornano

22 October 1994 14	Martigues	4–1	Caen	Martigues
20:00 CEST (UTC+2)

28 October 1994 15	Caen	5–1	Rennes	Caen
20:00 CET (UTC+1)				Stadium: Stade Michel d'Ornano

5 November 1994 16	Saint-Étienne	2–0	Caen	Saint-Étienne
20:00 CET (UTC+1)

9 November 1994 17	Caen	4–2	Bordeaux	Caen
20:00 CET (UTC+1)				Stadium: Stade Michel d'Ornano

19 November 1994 18	Le Havre	1–1	Caen	Le Havre
20:00 CET (UTC+1)

26 November 1994 19	Caen	0–0	Lens	Caen
20:00 CET (UTC+1)				Stadium: Stade Michel d'Ornano

2 December 1994 20	Cannes	1–0	Caen	Cannes
20:00 CET (UTC+1)

17 December 1994 21	Caen	0–2	Nantes	Caen
20:00 CET (UTC+1)				Stadium: Stade Michel d'Ornano

7 January 1995 22	Monaco	3–0	Caen	Monaco
20:00 CET (UTC+1)

21 January 1995 23	Caen	2–1	Bastia	Caen
20:00 CET (UTC+1)				Stadium: Stade Michel d'Ornano

28 January 1995 24	Metz	4–0	Caen	Metz
20:00 CET (UTC+1)

8 February 1995 25	Caen	0–1	Lyon	Caen
20:00 CET (UTC+1)				Stadium: Stade Michel d'Ornano

11 February 1995 26	Auxerre	1–1	Caen	Auxerre
20:00 CET (UTC+1)

24 February 1995 27	Caen	4–0	Strasbourg	Caen
20:00 CET (UTC+1)				Stadium: Stade Michel d'Ornano

4 March 1995 28	Caen	2–0	Lille	Caen
20:00 CET (UTC+1)				Stadium: Stade Michel d'Ornano

22 March 1995 30	Caen	0–0	Nice	Caen
20:00 CET (UTC+1)				Stadium: Stade Michel d'Ornano

1 April 1995 31	Montpellier	3–2	Caen	Montpellier
20:00 CEST (UTC+2)

8 April 1995 32	Caen	0–1	Martigues	Caen
20:00 CEST (UTC+2)				Stadium: Stade Michel d'Ornano

15 April 1995 33	Rennes	5–0	Caen	Rennes
20:00 CEST (UTC+2)

29 April 1995 34	Caen	3–0	Saint-Étienne	Caen
20:00 CEST (UTC+2)				Stadium: Stade Michel d'Ornano

6 May 1995 35	Bordeaux	2–0	Caen	Bordeaux
20:00 CEST (UTC+2)

17 May 1995 29	Paris Saint-Germain	2–0	Caen	Paris
20:30 CEST (UTC+2)

20 May 1995 36	Caen	2–2	Le Havre	Caen
20:00 CEST (UTC+2)				Stadium: Stade Michel d'Ornano

27 May 1995 37	Lens	2–0	Caen	Lens
20:00 CEST (UTC+2)

31 May 1995 38	Caen	3–1	Sochaux	Caen
20:00 CEST (UTC+2)				Stadium: Stade Michel d'Ornano

=== Coupe de France ===
14 January 1995 Round of 64	Caen	1–3	Saint-Brieuc Côtes d'Armor	Caen
20:00 CET (UTC+1)				Stadium: Stade Michel d'Ornano

=== Coupe de la Ligue ===
3 January 1995 Round of 32	Caen	3–1	Saint-Étienne	Caen
20:00 CET (UTC+1)				Stadium: Stade Michel d'Ornano

24 January 1995 Round of 16	Le Havre	2–1	Caen	Le Havre
20:00 CET (UTC+1)
