= Theodoros Disseris =

Swiss-Greek footballer (born 1975)

Personal information
- Full name: Theodoros Disseris
- Date of birth: 31 January 1975 (age 51)
- Height: 1.78 m (5 ft 10 in)
- Position: Defender

Youth career
- until 1992: BSC Old Boys

Senior career*
Years	Team	Apps	(Gls)
1992–1995	BSC Old Boys	24	(1)
1995–1999	FC Basel	21	(0)
1999–2001	FC Winterthur	37	(4)
2000–2001	→ SC Cham (loan)		
2001–2002	FC Basel	0	(0)
2001–2002	SC Kriens	8	(2)
2002–2003	FC Grenchen	9	(0)
2003–2006	SC Dornach		
- * Club domestic league appearances and goals

Theodoros Disseris (born 31 January 1975) is a Swiss-Greek former footballer who played in the 1990s and 2000s as defender.

Disseris played his youth football with BSC Old Boys and in 1992 advanced to their first team, who at that time played in the Nationalliga B, the second tier of Swiss football.

Disseris joined Basel's first team for their 1995–96 FC Basel season under head-coach Claude Andrey. Disseris played his domestic league debut for the club in the home game in the St. Jakob Stadium on 4 October 1995 as Basel won 1–0 against Young Boys.

Disseris stayed with the club for four seasons, but he never really broke into the team and was mainly used as substitute. Disseris played a total of 44 games for Basel without scoring a goal. 21 of these games were in the Nationalliga A, one in the Swiss Cup one in the UEFA Intertoto Cup and 21 were friendly games.

After his time with Basel, Disseris moved on to play three years for Winterthur, who at that time played in the Nationalliga B. In the middle of this time he was also loaned out for six months to SC Cham one league lower. Disseris returned to Winterthur and became regular starter in the team. During the summer break in 2001 Disseris returned to Basel, but did not play in the first team and so in the winter break he moved on to play the second half of the 2001–02 season for Kriens. Disseris then moved on to play one season for Grenchen and retired from professional football.

Disseris ended his active football playing at least three seasons for SC Dornach.

Since March 2018 Disseris is working as material manager for the foundation Youth Campus Basel in Münchenstein.

== Sources ==
- Die ersten 125 Jahre. Publisher: Josef Zindel im Friedrich Reinhardt Verlag, Basel. ISBN 978-3-7245-2305-5
- Verein "Basler Fussballarchiv" Homepage
