= Yannick Hasler =

Swiss footballer (born 1978)

Personal information
- Full name: Yannick Hasler
- Date of birth: 6 May 1978
- Place of birth: Basel, Switzerland
- Position: Defender

Senior career*
Years	Team	Apps	(Gls)
1995–1997	FC Basel	5	(0)
1998–1999	FC Baden		
1999–2000	SV Muttenz		
2000–2001	FC Basel	0	(0)
- * Club domestic league appearances and goals

Yannick Hasler (born 6 May 1978) is a Swiss former footballer who played in the 1990s as defender. He studied Economics (lic. rer. pol. University of Basel) and works for Bâloise since 2002.

== Football career ==
Hasler played his youth football for FC Basel and advanced to the first team for their 1995–96 season under head-coach Claude Andrey. After playing in four test games Hasler played his domestic league debut for the club in the home game in the St. Jakob Stadium on 18 April 1996 as Basel played 0–2 against Grasshopper Club.

Hasler then played the 1998–99 season with FC Baden in the second tier of Swiss football and the first half of the 1999–2000 season with SV Muttenz in the third tier. He then returned to Basel but played either in the eldest youth team or with their reserve team

Between the years 1995 and 200 Hasler played a total of 14 games for the Basel first team. Five of these games were in the Nationalliga A, one in the UEFA Intertoto Cup and seven were friendly games.

== Private life ==
Yannick Hasler studied Economics and obtained his Licentiate (lic. rer. pol.) at the University of Basel. During his studies he played football at the top level. He joined Bâloise in 2002, where one of his roles included managing the Motor Vehicle Insurance Department, which he did for eight years. He held the role of Head of Pricing at Baloise from 2015 and in 2019 he was selected as a new member of the Executive Committee at Baloise Switzerland for the Product Management Private Customers Department as of 1 January 2020.

== Sources ==
- Rotblau: Jahrbuch Saison 2017/2018. Publisher: FC Basel Marketing AG. ISBN 978-3-7245-2189-1
- Die ersten 125 Jahre. Publisher: Josef Zindel im Friedrich Reinhardt Verlag, Basel. ISBN 978-3-7245-2305-5
- Verein "Basler Fussballarchiv" Homepage
