= Vilmar (footballer) =

Brazilian footballer

Personal information
- Full name: Vilmar Barbosa Santos
- Date of birth: 7 January 1968 (age 58)
- Place of birth: Ipatinga, Brasil
- Height: 1.79 m (5 ft 10 in)
- Position: Defender

Senior career*
| Years | Team | Apps | (Gls) |
| 1987–1991 | Associação Ferroviária de Esportes | | |
| 1992–1993 | Esporte Clube Bahia | | |
| 1994–1995 | Associação Ferroviária de Esportes | | |
| 1995-1996 | FC Basel | 8 | (0) |
| 1995–1997 | FC Baden | 33 | (5) |
| 1997–2003 | SV Waldhof Mannheim | 136 | (3) |
- * Club domestic league appearances and goals

Vilmar Barbosa Santos (born 7 January 1968), commonly known as Vilmar is a Brazilian former footballer who played in the 1980s, 1990s and early 2000s as defender.

Vilmar played his youth football with a local club in his home town Ipatinga and transferred in 1987 to Associação Ferroviária de Esportes, for whom he played five years. In 1992 he moved on to Esporte Clube Bahia, where he played for two years, before he returned to Ferroviária, where he played another two seasons.

Vilmar joined Basel's first team for their 1995–96 season under head-coach Claude Andrey.After playing in six test games Vilmar played his domestic league debut for the club in the away game on 25 February 1996 as Basel played a 1–1 with Servette.

In the one season he was with the club Vilmar played a total of 15 games for Basel without scoring a goal. Eight of these games were in the Nationalliga A, one in the Swiss Cup and six were friendly games.

Following his time with Basel Vilmar moved on to play for FC Baden, where he played for one season. He then moved to Germany and joined SV Waldhof Mannheim, who played in the 1997–98_Regionalliga South. In his second season they achieved promotion to the 2. Bundesliga. Vilmar stayed with Mannheim for another four seasons.

== Sources ==
- Die ersten 125 Jahre. Publisher: Josef Zindel im Friedrich Reinhardt Verlag, Basel. ISBN 978-3-7245-2305-5
- Verein "Basler Fussballarchiv" Homepage
