= Davide Orlando =

Swiss footballer (born 1971)

Personal information
- Date of birth: 13 October 1971 (age 55)
- Place of birth: Monthey, Switzerland
- Height: 1.80 m (5 ft 11 in)
- Position: Midfielder

Team information
- Current team: FC Troistorrents (manager)

Youth career
- –1988: FC Monthey

Senior career*
Years	Team	Apps	(Gls)
1986–1990	FC Monthey		
1990–1995	FC Sion	126	(14)
1995–1997	FC Basel	39	(0)
1997–1998	Étoile Carouge FC	34	(9)
1998–1999	Lugano	0	(0)
1999–2000	FC Sion	20	(1)
2000–2001	Bellinzona	21	(2)
2001–2002	Vevey Sports		
2002–2004	Martigny-Sports		

Managerial career
- 2014–2020: FC Saint-Maurice
- 2021–2024: Martigny-Sports
- 2024–: FC Troistorrents
- * Club domestic league appearances and goals

Davide Orlando (born 13 October 1971) is a Swiss football manager and former player who manages FC Troistorrents. He was previously manager of Martigny-Sports. He played as a midfielder in the late 1980s and the 1990s.

== Playing career ==
Born in Monthey, Orlando played his youth football for local club FC Monthey and played in their first team in 1986. He returned to their youth team the following season and advanced again in 1988. Local Nationalliga A team FC Sion had been watching his progress and they signed Orlando before the 1990–91 Nationalliga A season. In the final of the 1990–91 Swiss Cup, he contributed two goals as Sion came back from a 2–0 deficit to win 3–2. The following 1991–92 Nationalliga A season Orlando won the Swiss championship with his club. He won the Swiss Cup for a second time with Sion in the 1994–95 edition. Orlando played for Sion for five seasons before moving on.

Orlando joined FC Basel's first team for their 1995–96 season under head-coach Claude Andrey. After playing in one test match and two games in the UEFA Intertoto Cup, Orlando played his domestic league debut for his new club in the away game on 29 July 1995 as Basel were defeated 1–0 by Neuchâtel Xamax. Orlando scored his first and only goal for the club in the away game on 20 July 1996. This game was in the UEFA Intertoto Cup but it could not help the team as Basel were defeated 3–2 by Russian team Rotor Volgograd.

Staying with the club for two seasons, Orlando played a total of 63 games for Basel. 40 of these games were in the Nationalliga A, five in the Swiss Cup, four in the Intertoto Cup and 14 were friendly games.

After his time with Basel, Orlando played one season with Étoile Carouge FC and one season with Lugano. He then returned to play for FC Sion, who in the meantime had suffered relegation to the Nationalliga B. In the 1999–2000 Nationalliga A/B season Orlando achieved immediate promotion with his team.

However, after promotion Orlando moved on to play a season for Bellinzona in the second tier of Swiss football. He then played one season for Vevey Sports, in the third tier, and then moved to Martigny-Sports, also in the third tier, where two years later he retired from active football.

== Managerial career ==
Orlando was appointed manager of Martigny-Sports in October 2021. In April 2024, Martigny-Sports announced Orlando would leave at the end of the season, after three seasons with the club.

In June 2024 it was announced he would take over third-tier side FC Troistorrents.

== Honours ==
FC Sion

- Swiss Cup: 1999–91, 1994–95

== Sources ==
- Die ersten 125 Jahre. Publisher: Josef Zindel im Friedrich Reinhardt Verlag, Basel. ISBN 978-3-7245-2305-5
- Verein "Basler Fussballarchiv" Homepage
