= Alex Nyarko =

Ghanaian footballer

Personal information
- Full name: Alexander Nyarko
- Date of birth: 15 October 1973 (age 53)
- Place of birth: Accra, Ghana
- Height: 1.84 m (6 ft 0 in)
- Position: Midfielder

Senior career*
Years	Team	Apps	(Gls)
1992–1993	Asante Kotoko		
1994	Dawu Youngstars		
1994–1995	Sportul Studenţesc	0	(0)
1995–1997	Basel	55	(8)
1997–1998	Karlsruher SC	22	(1)
1998–2000	Lens	45	(3)
2000–2004	Everton	33	(1)
2001–2002	→ Monaco (loan)	26	(2)
2002–2003	→ Paris Saint-Germain (loan)	18	(0)
2005	Start	3	(0)
2006–2007	Yverdon Sport	35	(1)
Total		237+	(16+)

International career
1998–2000	Ghana	11	(2)
Medal record
Men's association football
Representing Ghana
Olympic Games
Bronze medal – third place	1992 Barcelona	Team competition
- * Club domestic league appearances and goals

Alexander Nyarko (born 15 October 1973) is a Ghanaian former professional footballer who played as a midfielder.

== Club career ==
Nyarko started his career in Ghana, and in 1995 he joined Basel from Sportul Studenţesc.

Nyarko joined Basel for their 1995–96 season under head coach Claude Andrey. He played his debut for his new club in the home game at the St. Jakob Stadium the 1995 UEFA Intertoto Cup match on 8 July 1995 as Basel were beaten 3–2 by Karlsruher SC. After playing one test game and another UEFA Intertoto Cup match, he played his domestic league debut for the team in the home game on 19 July as Basel won 2–1 against Sion. He scored his first goal for the team on 5 November in the away game at the Cornaredo Stadium against Lugano. It was the only goal of the game as Basel won 1–0. He played for the team for two seasons and during this time Nyarko played a total of 83 games for Basel scoring a total of 15 goals. 55 of these games were in the Nationalliga A, six in the Swiss Cup, five in the UEFA Intertoto Cup and 17 were friendly games. He scored eight goals in the domestic league, two in the cup, one in the UIC and the other four were scored during the test games.

He then moved to Karlsruher in Germany and then two seasons for Lens in France. While at Lens, he played as a substitute in the final as they won the 1998–99 Coupe de la Ligue.

In 2000, he joined Everton for £4.5 million, signing a contract until June 2005. He scored his first and only goal for Everton against Tottenham Hotspur in September 2000. He is infamous for an incident during the 2000–01 season where during a game against Arsenal a fan came on the pitch and offered him his own royal blue Everton shirt, signalling that Nyarko was not good enough to wear the colours of Everton. After the fan was escorted away by police, Nyarko requested to be substituted and transferred.

Eventually, he went on loan to French club Monaco just days later for the rest of the season, and then had a loan spell at Paris Saint-Germain for the entire 2002–03 season. Nyarko returned to Everton for the 2003–04 season and made his return to the first team in a League Cup tie against Charlton Athletic. A few days later he made his first league appearance of the season against Chelsea and almost gave Everton the lead but his shot came back off the crossbar. He went on to make 11 league appearances for the Merseyside club that season, but was released after the season because his work permit expired and could not be renewed.

Nyarko then spent six months out of football, before joining Start in March 2005. He was, however, released by the club after an unauthorized trip to his family in Switzerland. Nyarko joined Swiss team Yverdon Sport in June 2006. He was released again in December 2007 and subsequently retired.

== International career ==
Nyarko was capped for Ghanaian Olympic team at 1992 Summer Olympics, and won a bronze medal. He also played for Ghana in 1998 and 2000 Africa Cup of Nations.

== Career statistics ==
=== International ===
Scores and results list Ghana's goal tally first, score column indicates score after each Nyarko goal.

List of international goals scored by Alex Nyarko
No.	Date	Venue	Opponent	Score	Result	Competition
1	9 February 1998	Stade du 4 Août, Ouagadougou, Burkina Faso	Tunisia	1–0	2–0	1998 Africa Cup of Nations
2	4 October 1998	Reunification Stadium, Douala, Cameroon	Cameroon	3–1	3–1	2000 Africa Cup of Nations qualification

== Honours ==
Lens

- Coupe de la Ligue: 1998–99
