= Daniele Moro =

Swiss footballer (born 1968)

Personal information
- Full name: Daniele Moro
- Date of birth: 2 September 1968
- Height: 1.80 m (5 ft 11 in)
- Position: Midfielder

Senior career*
Years	Team	Apps	(Gls)
1986–1987	FC Chiasso	19	(2)
1987–1988	FC Baden	14	(2)
1988–1992	FC Zürich	54	(4)
1992–1993	FC Chiasso	24	(2)
1993–1995	Xamax	13	(1)
1994–1995	→ Servette FC (loan)	17	(3)
1995–1996	FC Basel	14	(1)
1996	Lausanne-Sport	3	(0)
1996–1997	Noiraigue		

International career
1988–1990	Switzerland U21		
- * Club domestic league appearances and goals

Daniele Moro (born 2 September 1968) is a Swiss former footballer who played in the 1980s and 1990s as midfielder. He is Attorney-at-law and founding partner at Moro Recthsanwälte. He originally started his law firm in Lugano and now owns his chancellery in Lucerne. He is president of the Disciplinary Committee for the Swiss Football Association. He is arbitrator by the Court of Arbitration for Sport (TAS/CAS).

== Football career ==
Born in the Canton of Ticino Moro was brought up in Mendrisio and played for local club FC Chiasso in the second tier of Swiss football. In 1987 he moved on to play one season for FC Baden. He then transferred to higher tier FC Zürich and played for them for four seasons. During this time, he was called up for the Switzerland U21 national team. Moro then returned to FC Chiasso who had just achieved promotion and were strengthening their team for the 1992–93 Nationalliga A season. Unfortunately, at the end of the season Chiasso and Moro suffered relegation.

Moro then moved on and played one season for Xamax and one season out on loan to Servette.

Moro joined FC Basel's first team for their 1995–96 season under head-coach Claude Andrey. Moro played his domestic league debut for his new club in the away game on 29 July 1995 as Basel were defeated 0–1 by Xamax. He also received a yellow card in this match. Moro scored his first and only for goal the club on 19 September in the home game in the St. Jakob Stadium. It was the last goal of the match, but it could not help to save Basel from a 1–3 defeat against Grasshopper Club.

During the winter break Moro moved on. In the six months he was with the club, Moro played a total of 21 games for Basel scoring that one goal. 14 of these games were in the Nationalliga A, one was in the Swiss Cup and six were friendly games.

The second half of the 1995–96 Nationalliga A season Moro played with Lausanne-Sport. The following season Moro went to Noiraigue and ended his professional playing career. In total Moro played over 158 league games in the top two divisions, scored 15 goals and received a yellow card on 13 occasions, but never the red card.

== Private life ==
Moro obtained his certificate of admission to the bar in Geneva and he is now Attorney-at-law. He married and the couple had a son, but they are now divorced. Moro started a law firm in Lugano and now owns his own chancellery in Lucerne. Moro's focus is on criminal law and sports law.

In 2010 Moro became president of the Appeals Court at the central Swiss Football Association and one year later became Chairman of the Disciplinary Committee of the Swiss Football League (SFL).

Since becoming president he has had to deal with a number of difficult cases to deal with. For example, with FC Sion, who disregarded FIFA's transfer ban. A further was the case with Xamax, which was the first time ever that a club's license was withdrawn. The club was declared bankrupt in January 2012 and was consequently excluded from Swiss Super League.

Since 2016 he is arbitrator by the Court of Arbitration for Sport (TAS/CAS).

== Sources ==
- Die ersten 125 Jahre. Publisher: Josef Zindel im Friedrich Reinhardt Verlag, Basel. ISBN 978-3-7245-2305-5
- Verein "Basler Fussballarchiv" Homepage
