= Piotr Brzoza =

Polish footballer

Personal information
- Date of birth: 19 October 1966 (age 60)
- Place of birth: Tarnowskie Góry, Poland
- Height: 1.82 m (6 ft 0 in)
- Position: Defender

Senior career*
Years	Team	Apps	(Gls)
1984–1988	Polonia Bytom		
1989–1990	Górnik Zabrze	24	(0)
1991–1993	Śląsk Wrocław	68	(3)
1993–1995	Górnik Zabrze	44	(7)
1996–1997	Polonia Bytom		
1997–1998	Odra Wodzisław Śląski	19	(0)
2002–2005	Budowlani/Czarni Sucha Góra		

International career
1988	Poland	1	(0)
- * Club domestic league appearances and goals

Piotr Brzoza (born 19 October 1966) is a Polish former professional footballer who played as a defender.

He made one appearance for the Poland national team in 1988.
