= Andreas Niederer =

Swiss footballer (born 1967)

Personal information
- Full name: Andreas Niederer
- Date of birth: 22 August 1967
- Position: Goalkeeper

Senior career*
Years	Team	Apps	(Gls)
until 1995	FC Allschwil		
1995	FC Basel	4	(0)
- * Club domestic league appearances and goals

Andreas Niederer (born 22 August 1967) was a Swiss footballer who played in the 1990s as goalkeeper.

== Club career ==
Niederer joined FC Basel's first team from local amateur club FC Allschwil. He signed in as reserve goalkeeper during their 1994–95 season under head-coach Claude Andrey because first choice keeper Stefan Huber was injured.

After playing in one test game Niederer played his domestic league debut for the club in the away game on 13 May 1995 as Basel won 1–0 against Lausanne-Sport. He kept a clean sheet not only in this game, but also in his next match one week later.

In his half year with the club Niederer played a total of 5 games for Basel. Four of these games were in the Nationalliga A and the other was the friendly game against RC Strasbourg.

== Sources ==
- Die ersten 125 Jahre. Publisher: Josef Zindel im Friedrich Reinhardt Verlag, Basel. ISBN 978-3-7245-2305-5
- Verein "Basler Fussballarchiv" Homepage
