= Alexandre Rey =

Swiss footballer (born 1972)

Personal information
- Date of birth: 22 September 1972 (age 54)
- Place of birth: Sion, Switzerland
- Height: 1.76 m (5 ft 9 in)
- Position: Striker

Senior career*
| Years | Team | Apps | (Gls) |
| 1991–1994 | Sion | 65 | (23) |
| 1994–1996 | FC Basel | 61 | (15) |
| 1996–1997 | Sion | 5 | (0) |
| 1997–2001 | Servette | 132 | (54) |
| 2001–2002 | FC Luzern | 16 | (5) |
| 2002–2006 | Neuchâtel Xamax | 122 | (49) |
| Total | | 401 | (146) |

International career
| 1998–2005 | Switzerland | 18 | (5) |
- * Club domestic league appearances and goals

Alexandre Rey (born 22 September 1972) is a Swiss former professional footballer who played as a striker during the 1990s and 2000s. He is best known for his spells at Servette FC and Neuchâtel Xamax.

== Club career ==
Born in Sion, Rey played his youth football and began playing football professionally in 1991 with local club FC Sion, helping the club win the Swiss Cup in 1991 and the Swiss championship in the 1991–92 Nationalliga A season.

Rey joined FC Basel's first team for their 1994–95 season under head coach Claude Andrey. After playing in seven test games, Rey played his domestic league debut for his new club in the home game in the St. Jakob Stadium on 27 July 1994 as Basel were defeated 1–0 by Lugano. He scored his first goal for the club on 21 September in the home game against his former club Sion, but this did not help the team, as Basel lost the game 2–1. In the Swiss Cup round 3 match on 23 September 1995, Rey scored a hattrick within 40 minutes of the match against FC Subingen. In fact, he scored four goals as Basel won 6–1 to continue to the next round.

He stayed with the club for two seasons and during this time Rey played a total of 89 games for Basel scoring a total of 32 goals. Sixty-one of these games were in the Nationalliga A, 6 in the Swiss Cup, 4 in the 1995 UEFA Intertoto Cup and 18 were friendly games. He scored 16 goals in the domestic league, 6 in the Cup, 2 in the UIC and the other 9 were scored during the test games.

He returned to Sion ahead of the 1996–97 season. Although he was a success during his first spell at the club, Rey struggled to win a place in the starting eleven, playing just five games in six months, and left for Servette FC in January 1997. He was a major hit at Servette, playing the best football of his career and earning a call-up to the Switzerland squad. After making 132 appearances and scoring 54 goals for the club, Rey left to join FC Luzern in January 2001. He signed for Neuchâtel Xamax the following January and proved to be a good signing as he went on to score almost fifty goals for the club before his retirement in 2006.

== International career ==
Rey was capped 18 times for the Switzerland national team, scoring five goals. He made his international debut as a substitute against Hungary at the Ferenc Puskás Stadium in Budapest on 18 November 1998. He went on to make another fourteen appearances for Switzerland between then and 2001 when he was no longer included in the squad. He made a comeback to the national team when he replaced the suspended Alexander Frei and scored a hat-trick in the match against the Faroe Islands on 4 September 2004.

== Sources ==
- Die ersten 125 Jahre. Publisher: Josef Zindel im Friedrich Reinhardt Verlag, Basel. ISBN 978-3-7245-2305-5
- Verein "Basler Fussballarchiv" Homepage
