= Eduardo Carrasco (footballer) =

Swiss footballer (born 1972)

Personal information
- Full name: José Eduardo Carrasco Villar
- Date of birth: 30 March 1972 (age 54)
- Place of birth: Coronel, Chile
- Positions: Midfielder; defender

Senior career*
Years	Team	Apps	(Gls)
1991–1996	Lugano		
1996–1998	Lausanne-Sport	49	(3)
1998–1999	FC Stade Nyonnais	34	(8)
1999–2000	FC Sion		
2000	FC Bex		

Managerial career
- FC Stella Capriasca
- * Club domestic league appearances and goals

José Eduardo Carrasco Villar (born 30 March 1972), known as Eduardo Carrasco, is a Swiss former professional footballer who played as a midfielder.

== Personal life ==
Born in Chile, Carrasco and his parents fled to Lamone (in the canton of Ticino, Switzerland) in 1974 after dictator Augusto Pinochet seized power. He holds both nationalities.

== Post-retirement ==
He has worked as football coach for FC Stella Capriasca.
