= Pavel Karpf =

Swiss footballer (1969–2021)

Personal information
- Date of birth: 10 May 1969
- Place of birth: Aargau, Switzerland
- Date of death: 10 December 2021 (aged 52)
- Place of death: Croatia
- Position: Goalkeeper

Senior career*
Years	Team	Apps	(Gls)
1989–1993	BSC Old Boys		
1993–1997	FC Luzern		
- * Club domestic league appearances and goals

Pavel Karpf (10 May 1969 – 10 December 2021) was a Swiss professional footballer who played as a goalkeeper.

On 7 December 2021, Karpf suffered a heart attack while being on a boat trip in Croatia, and died three days later, at the age of 52.
