= Dilaver Satılmış =

Turkish footballer (born 1979)

Personal information
- Full name: Dilaver Satılmış
- Date of birth: 24 February 1979 (age 47)
- Place of birth: Basel, Switzerland
- Height: 1.79 m (5 ft 10 in)
- Position: Left back

Youth career
- 1995–1996: FC Basel

Senior career*
Years	Team	Apps	(Gls)
1996–1999	Trabzonspor	8	(0)
1999–2000	FC Luzern		
2000	SR Delémont		
2001–2003	FC Wil		
2003–2004	Diyarbakırspor	3	(0)
2004–2005	Antalyaspor		
2006	SV Darmstadt 98	14	(1)
2006–2009	SV Wacker Burghausen	26	(0)

International career
1996	Turkey U18		
1998	Turkey U21		
- * Club domestic league appearances and goals

Dilaver Satılmış (born 24 February 1979) is a former football player. Born in Switzerland, he represented Turkey at under-21 international level.

Satılmış played youth football with FC Basel. He played for Trabzonspor and Diyarbakirspor in the Turkish Super Lig, and after spells back the in Swiss leagues, later played for SV Darmstadt 98 and SV Wacker Burghausen in Germany.
