= Asif Šarić =

Bosnian footballer

Personal information
- Date of birth: 15 January 1965 (age 61)
- Place of birth: Bosnia and Herzegovina, SFR Yugoslavia
- Position: Midfielder

Senior career*
Years	Team	Apps	(Gls)
–1992	Sloboda Tuzla		
1992–1994	Arminia Bielefeld	49	(7)
1994–1995	FC Basel	21	(2)
1995–2001	Sportfreunde Siegen	83	(15)
2001–2002	SC Paderborn	53	(5)
2002–2003	SV Wilhelmshaven	34	(2)
2003–2004	LR Ahlen	1	(0)
2004–2005	SV Wilhelmshaven		

Managerial career
- 2006–2008: Bonner SC
- 2019: Hannover 96 (interim)
- * Club domestic league appearances and goals

Asif Šarić (born 15 January 1965) is a Bosnian football manager and former player who played as a midfielder. He was assistant coach for Hannover 96. He is currently assistant manager at EFL League One club Huddersfield Town.

== Football career ==
Šarić first played for Sloboda Tuzla and in 1992 he transferred to Germany to play for Arminia Bielefeld.

Šarić joined Basel's first team for their 1994–95 season under head coach Claude Andrey. Following their promotion in the previous season this was Basel's first season back in the highest tier of Swiss football. After playing in 8 test games Šarić played his domestic league debut for his new club in the away game in the Stade Olympique de la Pontaise on 3 August 1994 as Basel were defeated 2–1 by Lausanne-Sport. He scored his first goal for the club in the home game in the St. Jakob Stadium on 10 September. In fact he scored two goal as Basel won 4–0 against Luzern.

During his one season with the club, Šarić played a total of 39 games for Basel scoring a total of 4 goals. 21 of these games were in the Nationalliga A, three in the Swiss Cup and 15 were friendly games. He scored two goals in the domestic league, one in the cup and the other was scored during the test games.

Follow this year in Switzerland, Šarić return to Germany and played for Sportfreunde Siegen, SC Paderborn and SV Wilhelmshaven. He became assistant coach and reserve player for LR Ahlen in 2003. He was later assistant coach and then became head coach for Bonner SC in 2006. He was assistant coach for SC Paderborn between 2008 and 2011. In 2019 he was head coach ad interim for Hannover 96.

== Sources ==
- Rotblau: Jahrbuch Saison 2017/2018. Publisher: FC Basel Marketing AG. ISBN 978-3-7245-2189-1
- Die ersten 125 Jahre. Publisher: Josef Zindel im Friedrich Reinhardt Verlag, Basel. ISBN 978-3-7245-2305-5
- Verein "Basler Fussballarchiv" Homepage
