= Mart van Duren =

Dutch footballer

Personal information
- Full name: Martin van Duren
- Date of birth: 27 October 1964 (age 62)
- Place of birth: Nijmegen
- Position: Forward

Youth career
- Unitas '59
- Eindhoven
- 1981-1982: PSV

Senior career*
Years	Team	Apps	(Gls)
1982–1984	PSV	22	(4)
1984–1985	Racing Jet Brussels	44	(22)
1986–1990	BVV Den Bosch	132	(26)
1990–1994	Groningen	91	(15)
1994–1995	Basel	6	(1)
Total		295	(68)

International career
1983	Netherlands U19	1	(0)

Managerial career
- 2010–2011: Eindhoven (assistant)
- 2013–2014: PSV (academy assistant)
- 2017–2018: PSV (academy)
- * Club domestic league appearances and goals

Martin van Duren known as Mart (born 27 October 1964) is a Dutch retired football striker.

== Club career ==
Van Duren played his youth football in the youth department by PSV Eindhoven. In 1982 he advanced from their U-19 team to their first team. Two years later her transferred to Racing Jet Brussels, where he played for two seasons, but because the team were relegated, he then moved on to BVV Den Bosch, where he played for five seasons. At then Den Bosch, van Duren used to play at the right wing in a team featuring Hans Gillhaus, Jos van Herpen and Arnold Scholten. He moved to FC Groningen after Den Bosch got relegated, he played four seasons with them.

Van Duren joined FC Basel's first team for their 1994–95 season under head coach Claude Andrey. After playing in one test game against the clubs own U-21 team, in which he scored a goal, as the professionals won 5–0, van Duren played his domestic league debut for his new club in the away game in the Cornaredo on 2 October 1994 as Basel played against Lugano. He scored his first goal for the club in the same game as they played a 1–1 draw.

At the end of the season van Duren retired from his active football career. During his time with Basel, van Duren played a total of 12 games for the team scoring two goals. Six of these games were in the Nationalliga A and six were friendly games. He scored one goal in the domestic league and the other was scored in the afore mentioned test game.

== International career ==
Van Duren played once for the Netherlands national under-19 football team.

== Post-playing career ==
After retiring as a player he worked at PSV and FC Eindhoven and also was head coach at VV Geldrop. In 2020, van Duren returned to childhood club Unitas '59 to become Academy Director. He also owns a padel site in Son en Breugel.

== Sources ==
- Rotblau: Jahrbuch Saison 2017/2018. Publisher: FC Basel Marketing AG. ISBN 978-3-7245-2189-1
- Die ersten 125 Jahre. Publisher: Josef Zindel im Friedrich Reinhardt Verlag, Basel. ISBN 978-3-7245-2305-5
