= Dominic Moser =

Swiss footballer (born 1975)

Personal information
- Date of birth: 9 January 1975 (age 51)
- Position: Midfielder

Youth career
- until 1994: FC Birsfelden

Senior career*
Years	Team	Apps	(Gls)
1994–1996	FC Basel	32	(4)
1997–2000	BSC Young Boys	52	(2)
- * Club domestic league appearances and goals

Dominic Moser (born 9 January 1975) is a retired Swiss football midfielder.

Moser played his youth football with FC Birsfelden until summer 1994. He then joined FC Basel's first team under head coach Claude Andrey for their 1994–95 season. Basel had just won promotion the previous season.

After playing in 13 test games Moser played his domestic league debut for his new club in the away game in the Stadion Brügglifeld on 26 February 1995 as Basel won 1–0 against Aarau. He scored his first goal for his club one week later, on 5 March, in the home game in the St. Jakob Stadium against Sion. It was the first goal of the game as Basel won 3–1.

Moser stayed with the club until the winter break of the 1994–95 Nationalliga A season. During his time with Basel Moser played a total of 73 games for them scoring a total of nine goals. 32 of these games were in the Nationalliga A, 5 in the Swiss Cup, 6 in the UIC and 30 were friendly games. He scored 4 goals in the domestic league, 2 in the UIC and the other 3 were scored during the test games.

Moser moved on and signed Young Boys.
