= Christian Colombo =

Swiss footballer (born 1968)

Personal information
- Date of birth: 24 April 1968 (age 58)
- Place of birth: Lugano, Switzerland
- Height: 1.86 m (6 ft 1 in)
- Position: Midfielder

Senior career*
| Years | Team | Apps | (Gls) |
| 1986–1995 | Lugano | 198 | (25) |
| 1996 | Sion | 28 | (3) |
| 1997 | Lugano | | |

International career
| 1989–1996 | Switzerland | 6 | (0) |
- * Club domestic league appearances and goals

Christian Colombo (born 24 April 1968) is a Swiss former professional footballer who played as a midfielder.

== Honours ==
FC Sion

- Swiss Cup: 1995–96
