= Philippe Cuervo =

French footballer (born 1969)

Personal information
- Date of birth: 13 August 1969 (age 55)
- Place of birth: Ris-Orangis, France
- Position(s): Defender, midfielder

Senior career*
Years	Team	Apps	(Gls)
1987–1994	Saint-Étienne	98	(3)
1994–1996	Sochaux	62	(3)
1996–1997	Saint-Étienne		
1997–2000	Swindon Town	35	(0)
2000–2001	US Créteil-Lusitanos	10	(0)
2001–2003	Lavallois		
2003–2006	Red Star		
2006–2007	Montgeron		
- *Club domestic league appearances and goals

Philippe Cuervo (born 13 August 1969) is a French former professional footballer who played as a defender or midfielder.

== Career ==
Cuervo started his senior career with AS Saint-Étienne. In 1997, he signed for Swindon Town in the English Football League Second Division, where he made forty-eight appearances and scored zero goals. After that, he played for French clubs US Créteil-Lusitanos, Stade Lavallois, Red Star and Montgeron before retiring in 2007.
