= 1997–98 FC Aarau season =

FC Aarau
1997–98 season
- Club president: Ernst Lämmli
- Head-coach: Martin Trümpler
- Stadium: Stadion Brügglifeld, Aarau
- 1997–98 NLA Qualifying phase: 4th of 12
- Championship group: 7th of 8
- 1997–98 Swiss Cup: Quarter-finals
- 1997 UEFA Intertoto Cup: 5th in Group stage
- Top goalscorer: League: Sasa Ciric (13); All: Sasa Ciric (13)

The 1997–98 season was FC Aarau's 95th season in their existence, since their foundation in 1902. It was their sixteenth season in the top flight of Swiss football, following their promotion at the end of 1980–81 season. FCA played their home games in the Stadion Brügglifeld and the stadium is located on the southern outskirts of Aarau, in the territory of the neighboring municipality of Suhr. It is about one and a half kilometers from Aarau city center and the railway station.

== Overview ==
The local businessman and architect Ernst Lämmli was the club's chairman and patron at this time. He held this position since the AGM in 1989. Lämmli extended the contract with Martin Trümpler as head-coach and Trümpler continued into his third season in this position with the club..

The FCA first team competed in this season's domestic first-tier 1997–98 Nationalliga A with the clear intention of reaching the championship group and again to qualify for the European competitions. To achieve this would mean they would have to finish the qualifying stage under the top eight teams. The team also competed in the 1997–98 Swiss Cup. The FCA team had ended the previous season in fifth position and so had not qualified for the European competitions, but they did enter the 1997 UEFA Intertoto Cup.

== Players ==
The following is the list of the FCA first team squad this season. It also includes players that were in the squad the day the domestic league season started, on 5 July 1997, but subsequently left the club after that date.

Note: Flags indicate national team as defined under FIFA eligibility rules; some limited exceptions apply. Players may hold more than one non-FIFA nationality.

| No. | Pos. | Nation | Player |
|---|---|---|---|
| — | GK | SUI | Ivan Benito (league games: 21) |
| — | GK | SUI | Andreas Hilfiker (league games: 15) |
| — | DF | SUI | David Bader (league games: 20) |
| — | DF | SUI | Bernd Kilian (league games: 34) |
| — | DF | SUI | Dejan Markovic (league games: 33) |
| — | DF | SUI | Frédéric Page (league games: 9) |
| — | DF | CRO | Mirko Pavličević (league games: 35) |
| — | DF | SUI | Ivan Previtali (league games: 9) |
| — | DF | SUI | Beat Studer (league games: 23) |
| — | DF | SUI | Davide Zitola (league games: 16) |
| — | MF | AUS | Ross Aloisi (league games: 32) |

| No. | Pos. | Nation | Player |
|---|---|---|---|
| — | MF | SUI | Marcel Heldmann (league games: 5) |
| — | MF | SUI | Elvir Melunović (league games: 10) |
| — | MF | NED | Lodewijk Roembiak (league games: 31) |
| — | MF | POL | Dariusz Skrzypczak (league games: 34) |
| — | MF | SUI | Gerardo Viceconte (league games: 2) |
| — | MF | SUI | André Wiederkehr (league games: 28) |
| — | FW | MKD | Sasa Ciric (league games: 13) |
| — | FW | SUI | Patrick de Napoli (league games: 33) |
| — | FW | SUI | Samuel Drakopulos (league games: 27) |
| — | FW | LUX | Jeff Saibene (league games: 18) |
| — | FW | SUI | Carmine Viceconte (league games: 8) |
| — | FW | AUS | David Zdrilic (league games: 25) |

Players who left the squad

The following is the list of the FCZ first team players that left the squad during the previous season or in the off-season, before the new domestic season began.

Note: Flags indicate national team as defined under FIFA eligibility rules; some limited exceptions apply. Players may hold more than one non-FIFA nationality.

| No. | Pos. | Nation | Player |
|---|---|---|---|
| — | DF | SUI | Sven Christ (to Grasshopper Club) |
| — | DF | SUI | Marc Hodel (to Sion) |
| — | MF | SUI | Renato Brugnoli (to Zürich) |

| No. | Pos. | Nation | Player |
|---|---|---|---|
| — | MF | BUL | Ivo Georgiev (to Levski Sofia) |
| — | MF | SUI | Christof Oldani (to Baden) |
| — | MF | SUI | Remo Senn (to Locarno) |
| — | FW | SUI | Remo Tovagliaro (reserves) |

== Results ==
Legend

Win Draw Loss Postponed

=== Nationalliga A ===
==== Qualification phase ====
The first stage of the NLA began on 5 July 1997 and was completed on 7 December. The top eight teams in the qualification phase would advance to the championship group and the last four teams would play against relegation.

| 5 July 1997 Round 1 | Basel | P–P | Aarau | St. Jakob Stadium, Basel |
Note: Match posponed and rescheduled to allow Aarau to play the match in the Intertoto Cup against 1. FC Köln.

| 9 July 1997 Round 2 | Aarau | 3–0 | Kriens | Stadion Brügglifeld, Aarau |
| 19:30 | Drakopulos 66' (1:0); Wiederkehr 72' (2:0); Drakopulos 90+1' (3:0); Kilian (yellow card) | FCA summary | (red card) 77' Melina; (yellow card) Gross | Attendance: 3,800; Referee: (Switzerland) Massimo Busacca (Monte Carasso/Bellinzona) |

| 12 July 1997 Round 3 | Zürich | 1–1 | Aarau | Letzigrund, Zürich |
| 19:30 | Nonda (yellow card) 24'; Konjic (yellow card) 48'; Fischer (yellow card) 55'; Konjic 64' (1:1) | FCZ summary FCA summary | (yellow card) 8' B. Studer; 36' (0:1) Drakopulos; (yellow card) 42' Wiederkehr; (yellow card) 73' de Napoli | Attendance: 6,300; Referee: (Switzerland) Kurt Zuppinger (Bremgarten, Aargau) |

| 16 July 1997 Round 4 | Aarau | 1–1 | Sion | Stadion Brügglifeld, Aarau |
| 19:30 | Wiederkehr 35' (1:0); Wiederkehr (yellow card) de Napoli (yellow card); Studer (yellow card); Roembiak (yellow card) | FCA summary | 90' (1:1) Hodel; (yellow card) Quentin; (yellow card) Eydelie | Attendance: 3,300; Referee: (Switzerland) Nicolas Daina |

| 26 July 1997 Round 5 | St. Gallen | 2–1 | Aarau | Espenmoos, St. Gallen |
| 17:30 | Vurens 80' (1:1); Zwyssig 89' (2:1); Hellinga (yellow card) | FCA summary | 45' (0:1) Aloisi; (yellow card) Roembiak; (yellow card) Aloisi; (yellow card) Kilian; (yellow card) Skrzypczak | Attendance: 10,600; Referee: (Switzerland) Marcel Vollenweider (Rüti, Zürich) |

| 2 August 1997 Round 6 | Aarau | 0–2 | Grasshopper Club | Stadion Brügglifeld, Aarau |
| 19:30 | Roembiak (yellow card) | FCA summary | 6' (0:1) Moldovan; 67' (0:1) Moldovan; (yellow card) Ahinful | Attendance: 6,400; Referee: (Switzerland) Claude Detruche (Thônex) |

| 9 August 1997 Round 7 | Xamax | 3–0 | Aarau | Stade de la Maladière, Neuchâtel |
| 19:30 | Isabella 8' (1:0); Isabella 40' (2:0); Wittl 81' (3:0); Alicarte (yellow card); Martinović (yellow card) | FCA summary | (yellow card) Markovic; (yellow card) Wiederkehr; (yellow card) Roembiak | Attendance: 7,800; Referee: (Switzerland) Serge Muhmenthaler (Grenchen) |

| 15 August 1997 Round 1 | Basel | 2–1 | Aarau | St. Jakob Stadium, Basel |
| 19:30 | Ceccaroni (yellow card) 14'; Gaudino 21' (1:0); Giallanza 31' (2:0); Frick (yellow card) 67'; Kreuzer (yellow card) 87' | FCB summary FCA summary | (yellow card) 19' Aloisi; 61' (2:1) Drakopulos; (yellow card) 65' Zdrilic; (yellow card) 70' de Napoli; (yellow card) 78' Kilian | Attendance: 9,500; Referee: (Switzerland) Guido Wildhaber (Kerzers) |
Note: This match was rescheduled after its postponement from 5 July due to FC Aarau's participation in the Intertoto Cup. Basel without La Placa, Tschopp (both suspended), Henry, Knup, Konde, Disseris and Hasler (all injured); Aarau without Roembiak (suspended), Heldmann, Kirik and Benito (all injured).

| 24 August 1997 Round 8 | Aarau | 3–1 | Luzern | Stadion Brügglifeld, Aarau |
| 16:00 | de Napoli 3' (1:0) de Napoli 7' (2:0); Wiederkehr 82' (3:1) de Napoli (yellow card); Aloisi (yellow card) | FCA summary | 20' (2:1) Kögl | Attendance: 4,400; Referee: (Switzerland) Marcel Vollenweider (Rüti, Zürich) |

| 30 August 1997 Round 9 | Servette | 2–1 | Aarau | Charmilles Stadium, Geneva |
| 19:30 | Cantaluppi 45' (1:1); Rey 59' (2:1); Müller (yellow card); Durix (yellow card) | FCA summary | 22' (0:1) Zdrilic; (yellow card) Aloisi; (yellow card) Drakopulos; (yellow card) Roembiak | Attendance: 5,300; Referee: (Switzerland) Andreas Schluchter (Schönenbuch) |

| 14 September 1997 Round 10 | Aarau | 3–0 | Étoile Carouge | Stadion Brügglifeld, Aarau |
| 16:00 | Zdrilic 20' (1:0); Pavličević 33' (2:0); Drakopulos 80' (3:0); Skrzypczak (yellow card) | FCA summary | (yellow card) Hertig; (yellow card) Mosca; (yellow card) Cravero | Attendance: 3,200; Referee: (Switzerland) Philippe Leuba (Chexbres) |

| 20 September 1997 Round 11 | Lausanne-Sport | 2–1 | Aarau | Olympique de la Pontaise, Lausanne |
| 19:30 | Thurre 2' (1:0); Nkufo 12' (2:0); Londono (red card) 60'; Thurre (yellow card) | FCA summary | 33' (2:1) Studer; (yellow card) (yellow-red card) 90' Zdrilic; (yellow card) de Napoli; (yellow card) Aloisi; (yellow card) Pavličević; (yellow card) Viceconte | Attendance: 3,550; Referee: (Switzerland) Serge Muhmenthaler (Grenchen) |

| 24 September 1997 Round 12 | Aarau | 1–0 | Basel | Stadion Brügglifeld, Aarau |
| 19:30 | Roembiak (yellow card) 32'; Kilian (yellow card) 68'; Ćirić 75' | FCB summary FCA summary | (yellow card) 64' Kreuzer | Attendance: 5,600; Referee: (Switzerland) Dieter Schoch (Attiswil) |
Note: FCA without Bader, Heldmann (both injured) and Zitola (suspended). FCB without Knup, Henry, Salvi, Hasler, Disseris (all injured), Frick and Ceccaroni (both suspended). After the break Hartmann right-back, Gaudino for Frei in the attack. In the stands Thomas Bickel and national coach Rolf Fringer.

| 27 September 1997 Round 13 | Kriens | 3–5 | Aarau | Stadion Kleinfeld, Kriens |
| 19:30 | Esposito 27' (pen. 1:0); Zwyssig (red card) 56'; Esposito 63' (pen. 2:2); Gross 89' (3:5); Egli (yellow card); Erni (yellow card); Owusu (yellow card) | FCA summary | 30' (1:1) Ciric; 52' (1:2); 69' (2:3) Zitola; 80' (2:4) de Napoli; 88' (2:5) Ciric; (yellow card) Hilfiker | Attendance: 3,800; Referee: (Switzerland) Carlo Bertolini (Vira-Gambarogno) |

| 4 October 1997 Round 14 | Aarau | 1–0 | Zürich | Stadion Brügglifeld, Aarau |
| 19:30 | Roembiak 29' (1:0) | FCZ summary FCA summary | (yellow card) 65' Sant'Anna; (yellow card) 90+1' Brugnoli | Attendance: 3,900; Referee: (Switzerland) Markus Nobs (Wohlen bei Bern) |

| 19 October 1997 Round 16 | Aarau | 2–0 | St. Gallen | Stadion Brügglifeld, Aarau |
| 16:00 | de Napoli 32' (1:0); Aloisi 64' (2:0); Roembiak (yellow card); Markovic (yellow card) | FCA summary | (red card) 85' Dal Santo; (yellow card) Tsawa; (yellow card) Hellinga; (yellow card) Contini; (yellow card) Bühlmann | Attendance: 5,400; Referee: (Switzerland) Guido Wildhaber (Kerzers) |
Note: Matchday 16 was brought completely forward.

| 25 October 1997 Round 15 | Sion | 2–3 | Aarau | Stade Tourbillon, Sion |
| 17:30 | (Studer) 70' (o.g.); Ouattara 75' (pen. 2:3); Derivaz (yellow card); Milton (yellow card) | FCA summary | 16' (pen. 0:1) Roembiak; 25' (0:2) Ciric; 54' (0:3) Aloisi; (yellow card) Markovic | Attendance: 7,500; Referee: (Switzerland) Dieter Schoch (Attiswil) |

| 1 November 1997 Round 17 | Grasshopper Club | 4–1 | Aarau | Hardturm, Zürich |
| 16:00 | Moldovan 10' (pen.); Gren 23' (2:0); Türkyilmaz 32' (3:0); Türkyilmaz 40' (4:0); Haas (yellow card) (yellow-red card) 45'; Esposito (yellow card) | FCA summary | 69' (4:1) Drakopulos; (yellow card) Markovic; (yellow card) Aloisi | Attendance: 8,400; Referee: (Switzerland) Dominique Tavel (Lonay) |

| 9 November 1997 Round 18 | Aarau | 2–2 | Xamax | Stadion Brügglifeld, Aarau |
| 14:30 | Ciric 6' (1:0); Ciric 27' (2:0) | FCA summary | 62' (pen.) Martinović; 76' (2:2) Helgason; (yellow card) Zambaz | Attendance: 4,600; Referee: (Switzerland) Serge Muhmenthaler (Grenchen) |

| 19 November 1997 Round 19 | Luzern | 0–0 | Aarau | Stadion Allmend, Luzern |
| 19:30 | Koilov (yellow card) (yellow-red card) 55' van Eck (red card) 55'; Wyss (yellow card) | FCA summary | (yellow card) Saibene | Attendance: 6,830; Referee: (Switzerland) Carlo Bertolini (Vira-Gambarogno) |

| 23 November 1997 Round 20 | Aarau | 3–1 | Servette | Stadion Brügglifeld, Aarau |
| 14:30 | Ciric 35' (1:1); Ciric 68' (2:1) de Napoli 76' (3:1) | FCA summary | 32' (0:1) Varela; (red card) 41' Pizzinat; (yellow card) Varela; (yellow card) Sesa; (yellow card) Müller | Attendance: 4,300; Referee: (Switzerland) Kurt Zuppinger (Bremgarten, Aargau) |

| 30 November 1997 Round 21 | Étoile Carouge | 1–1 | Aarau | Stade de la Fontenette, Carouge |
| 14:30 | Negri 69' (1:0); Croci (yellow card); Hertig (yellow card); Aguiar (yellow card); Nourou (yellow card) | FCA summary | 72' (1:1) Ciric | Attendance: 1,100; Referee: (Switzerland) Marcel Vollenweider (Rüti, Zürich) |

| 7 December 1997 Round 22 | Aarau | 4–2 | Lausanne-Sport | Stadion Brügglifeld, Aarau |
| 14:30 | Ciric 5' (1:0); Melunović 54' (2:1); Ciric 81' (3:2); Ciric 85' (4:2) | FCA summary | 31' (pen. 1:1) Celestini; 56' (2:2) Thurre; (yellow card) Celestini | Attendance: 4,100; Referee: (Switzerland) Serge Muhmenthaler (Grenchen) |

==== Qualification table ====
| Pos | Team | Pld | W | D | L | GF | GA | GD | Pts | Qualification |
|---|---|---|---|---|---|---|---|---|---|---|
| 1 | Grasshopper Club | 22 | 14 | 4 | 4 | 59 | 23 | +36 | 46 | Advance to championship round halved points (rounded up) as bonus |
| 2 | Lausanne-Sport | 22 | 12 | 6 | 4 | 45 | 27 | +18 | 42 | Advance to championship round halved points (rounded up) as bonus |
| 3 | Servette | 22 | 11 | 6 | 5 | 45 | 33 | +12 | 39 | Advance to championship round halved points (rounded up) as bonus |
| 4 | Aarau | 22 | 10 | 5 | 7 | 38 | 31 | +7 | 35 | Advance to championship round halved points (rounded up) as bonus |
| 5 | St. Gallen | 22 | 7 | 9 | 6 | 38 | 34 | +4 | 30 | Advance to championship round halved points (rounded up) as bonus |
| 6 | Zürich | 22 | 7 | 9 | 6 | 31 | 28 | +3 | 30 | Advance to championship round halved points (rounded up) as bonus |
| 7 | Sion | 22 | 7 | 9 | 6 | 30 | 27 | +3 | 30 | Advance to championship round halved points (rounded up) as bonus |
| 8 | Luzern | 22 | 7 | 8 | 7 | 26 | 28 | −2 | 29 | Advance to championship round halved points (rounded up) as bonus |
| 9 | Xamax | 22 | 7 | 5 | 10 | 37 | 39 | −2 | 26 | Continue to promotion/relegation round |
| 10 | Kriens | 22 | 5 | 7 | 10 | 23 | 41 | −18 | 22 | Continue to promotion/relegation round |
| 11 | Basel | 22 | 5 | 4 | 13 | 28 | 46 | −18 | 19 | Continue to promotion/relegation round |
| 12 | Étoile Carouge | 22 | 1 | 6 | 15 | 20 | 63 | −43 | 9 | Continue to promotion/relegation round |

Source: rsssf.com
Rules for classification: 1) Points; 2) Goal difference; 3) Goals scored; 4) Head-to-head points; 5) Away goals scored; 6) Draw.

==== Championship group ====
The first eight teams of the qualification phase competed in the Championship round. The teams took half of the points (rounded up to complete units) gained in the qualification as bonus with them. The championship phase began on 1 March 1998 and was completed on 23 May.

| 1 March 1998 Round 1 | Aarau | 2–0 | Lausanne-Sport | Stadion Brügglifeld, Aarau |
| 14:30 | Roembiak 34' (1:0); Wiederkehr 67' (1:0) de Napoli (yellow card) | FCA summary | (yellow card) Hottiger; (yellow card) Thurre | Attendance: 3,600; Referee: (Switzerland) Claude Detruche (Thônex) |

| 8 March 1998 Round 2 | Grasshopper Club | 5–3 | Aarau | Hardturm, Zürich |
| 14:30 | Subiat 4' (1:0); Subiat 20' (2:0); Türkyilmaz 25' (3:0); Türkyilmaz 31' (4:0); Kavelashvili 37' (5:0); Comisetti (yellow card); Christ (yellow card) | FCA summary | 45' (5:1) de Napoli; 52' (5:2) Drakopulos; 67' (5:3) Roembiak; (yellow card) Roembiak | Attendance: 7,400; Referee: (Switzerland) Carlo Bertolini (Vira-Gambarogno) |

| 15 March 1998 Round 3 | Aarau | 1–1 | Luzern | Stadion Brügglifeld, Aarau |
| 14:30 | Aloisi 78' (pen. 1:1); Kilian (yellow card) | FCA summary | 19' (0:1) Brunner | Attendance: 5,200; Referee: (Switzerland) Dieter Schoch (Attiswil) |

| 21 March 1998 Round 4 | Sion | 0–0 | Aarau | Stade Tourbillon, Sion |
| 17:30 | Chassot (yellow card); Seoane (yellow card) | FCA summary | (yellow card) Wiederkehr | Attendance: 6,500; Referee: (Liechtenstein) Roland Beck (Triesenberg) |

| 29 March 1998 Round 5 | Aarau | 1–3 | Servette | Stadion Brügglifeld, Aarau |
| 16:00 | Kilian 80' (1:2); Skrzypczak (yellow card); Aloisi (yellow card); Wiederkehr (yellow card) | FCA summary | 12' (0:1) Tato; 27' (0:2) Rey; 90+1' (1:3) Šiljak; (yellow card) Fournier; (yellow card) Šiljak; (yellow card) Ouadja; (yellow card) Potocianu; (yellow card) Rey | Attendance: 3,900; Referee: (Switzerland) Andreas Schluchter (Schönenbuch) |

| 4 April 1998 Round 6 | St. Gallen | 2–0 | Aarau | Espenmoos, St. Gallen |
| 17:30 | Vidallé 18' (1:0); Vurens 45' (2:0); Nyathi (yellow card) (yellow-red card) 72'; Vurens (yellow card) | FCA summary | (yellow card) Wiederkehr; (yellow card) Heldmann; (yellow card) Pavličević; (yellow card) Roembiak | Attendance: 8,100; Referee: (Switzerland) Carlo Bertolini (Vira-Gambarogno) |

| 8 April 1998 Round 7 | Zürich | 3–2 | Aarau | Letzigrund, Zürich |
| 19:30 | Yekini 3' (1:0); Opango 53' (2:1); Nonda 67' (3:1); Fischer (yellow card) 70' | FCZ summary FCA summary | 4' (1:1) De Napoli; (yellow card) 54' Wiederkehr; 70' (3:2) Aloisi; (yellow card) 70' Aloisi | Attendance: 5,600; Referee: (Switzerland) Claude Detruche, (Thônex) |

| 19 April 1998 Round 8 | Aarau | 1–2 | Zürich | Stadion Brügglifeld, Aarau |
| 16:00 | Pavličević (yellow card) 42'; Previtali (yellow card) 64' (Fischer) 90' (o.g.) | FCZ summary FCA summary | 20' (0:1) Nonda; 68' (0:2) Nonda | Attendance: 3,500; Referee: (Switzerland) Urs Meier (Wettingen and Würenlos) |

| 26 April 1998 Round 9 | Aarau | 0–1 | St. Gallen | Stadion Brügglifeld, Aarau |
| 16:00 | Markovic (yellow card) de Napoli (yellow card); Previtali (yellow card); Roembiak (yellow card) | FCA summary | 90+2' (0:1) Zwyssig; (yellow card) Sene | Attendance: 2,800; Referee: (Liechtenstein) Roland Beck (Triesenberg) |

| 29 April 1998 Round 10 | Servette | 1–1 | Aarau | Charmilles Stadium, Geneva |
| 19:30 | Šiljak 11' (1:0) | FCA summary | 80' (1:1) Aloisi; (yellow card) Previtali; (yellow card) Pavličević | Attendance: 4,000; Referee: (Switzerland) Dominique Tavel (Lonay) |

| 3 May 1998 Round 11 | Aarau | 1–2 | Sion | Stadion Brügglifeld, Aarau |
| 16:00 | Previtali 79' (1:2) de Napoli (yellow card) | FCA summary | 45' (0:1) Derivaz; 61' (0:2) Ouattara; (yellow card) Derivaz | Attendance: 2,900; Referee: (Switzerland) Philippe Leuba (Chexbres) |

| 9 May 1998 Round 12 | Luzern | 0–0 | Aarau | Stadion Allmend, Luzern |
| 19:30 | Knez (yellow card) | FCA summary | (yellow card) Heldmann; (yellow card) Skrzypczak | Attendance: 3,370; Referee: (Liechtenstein) Roland Beck (Triesenberg) |

| 16 May 1998 Round 13 | Aarau | 0–3 | Grasshopper Club | Stadion Brügglifeld, Aarau |
| 19:30 | | FCA summary | 8' (0:1) Kavelashvili; 32' (0:2) Kavelashvili; 64' (0:3) Ahinful; (yellow card) Haas | Attendance: 2,900; Referee: (Switzerland) Guido Wildhaber (Kerzers) |

| 23 May 1998 Round 14 | Lausanne-Sport | 4–1 | Aarau | Olympique de la Pontaise, Lausanne |
| 19:30 | Piffaretti 17' (1:0); Puce 20' (2:0); Ohrel 64' (3:0); Carrasco 68' (4:0) | FCA summary | 77' (4:1) Previtali | Attendance: 6,050; Referee: (Switzerland) Dieter Schoch (Attiswil) |

==== Final league table ====
| Pos | Team | Pld | W | D | L | GF | GA | GD | BP | Pts | Qualification |
|---|---|---|---|---|---|---|---|---|---|---|---|
| 1 | Grasshopper Club | 14 | 11 | 1 | 2 | 39 | 16 | +23 | 23 | 57 | Swiss champions qualified for Champions League first qualifying round |
| 2 | Servette | 14 | 5 | 6 | 3 | 18 | 15 | +3 | 20 | 41 | qualified for UEFA Cup second qualifying round |
| 3 | Lausanne-Sport | 14 | 5 | 4 | 5 | 17 | 17 | 0 | 21 | 40 | Swiss Cup winners qualified for Cup Winners' Cup qualifying round |
| 4 | Zürich | 14 | 6 | 5 | 3 | 27 | 17 | +10 | 15 | 38 | qualified for UEFA Cup second qualifying round |
| 5 | Sion | 14 | 6 | 4 | 4 | 23 | 21 | +2 | 15 | 37 | entered the Intertoto Cup first round |
| 6 | St. Gallen | 14 | 4 | 5 | 5 | 12 | 17 | −5 | 15 | 32 | entered the Intertoto Cup first round |
| 7 | Aarau | 14 | 1 | 4 | 9 | 13 | 27 | −14 | 18 | 25 | |
| 8 | Luzern | 14 | 1 | 5 | 8 | 10 | 29 | −19 | 15 | 23 | |

Source: rsssf.com
Rules for classification: 1) points; 2) Position in the qualification.

Grasshopper Club won the league championship and this was the 25th championship win for GC in the club's history.

=== Swiss Cup ===
The Cup competition began on 3, 6, 7 and 8 August 1997 with the first games of the first Round and ended on 1 June 1998 with the final, which was held at the former Wankdorf in Bern. The Cup winners earned a place in the qualifying round of the Cup Winners' Cup. The first-tier clubs from the 1997–98 Nationalliga A were granted byes for the first four rounds, they joined the competition in the fifth round. The first-tier teams were seeded and cound not be drawn against each other. The draw respected regionalities, when possible, and the lower classed team was granted home advantage.

| 16 November 1997 Round 5 | Baden | 1–4 | Aarau | Esp Stadium, Fislisbach |
| | Casamento 24' (1:1) | FCA summary | 5' (0:1) Drakopulos; 52' (1:2) Wiederkehr; 76' (1:3) Skrzypczak; 78' (1:4) de Napoli | Attendance: 5,015; Referee: (Liechtenstein) Roland Beck (Triesenberg |

| 1 April 1998 Round 6 | Meyrin | 2–5 | Aarau | Stade des Arbères, Meyrin |
| | Brunner 25' (1:1); Studer 90' (2:5) | FCA summary | 16' (0:1) Zdrilic; 40' (1:2) C. Viceconte; 45' (1:3) Kilian; 45+1' (1:4) C. Viceconte; 48' (1:5) Roembiak | Attendance: 850; Referee: (Switzerland) Markus Nobs (Wohlen bei Bern) |

| 12 April 1998 Quarter-final | Lugano | 1–0 | Aarau | Cornaredo, Lugano |
| | Vivas 66' (1:0) | FCA summary | | Attendance: 3,200; Referee: (Switzerland) Jürg Herrmann (Hinterkapplen (Wohlen bei Bern)) |

At the end of the season Lausanne-Sport won the cup and this was the 8th cup title for LS to that date.

=== Intertoto Cup ===
The Intertoto Cup was played by 60 teams. The first stage was played as a group stage, there were twelve groups, with each five teams that played a single round robin. The group winners continued in a knock out stage, with six semi-finals and three finals. The three winners were qualified for the 1997–98 UEFA Cup.

==== Group 4 ====
Aarau were assigned to group 4 and they were rested on matchday 4.

| 22 June 1997 Matchday 1 | Standard Liège (Belgium) | 0–0 | (Switzerland) Aarau | Stade Maurice Dufrasne, Liège |
| | | FCA summary | | Attendance: 2,412; Referee: Livio Bazzoli (Italy) |

| 29 June 1997 Matchday 2 | Aarau (Switzerland) | 0–1 | (Israel) Maccabi Petah Tikva | Stadion Brügglifeld, Aarau |
| | | FCA summary | 74' Biala | Attendance: 1,400; Referee: Marcel Lică (Romania) |

| 6 July 1997 Matchday 3 | Köln (Germany) | 3–0 | (Switzerland) Aarau | Südstadion, Cologne |
| | Vlădoiu 22' (1:0); Vlădoiu 29' (2:0); Vlădoiu 84' (3:0) | FCA summary | | Attendance: 11,000; Referee: Milan Mitrović (Slovenia) |

| 19 July 1997 Matchday 5 | Aarau (Switzerland) | 0–0 | (Republic of Ireland) Cork City | Stadion Brügglifeld, Aarau |
| | | FCA summary | | Attendance: 700; Referee: Željko Širić (Croatia) |

==== Group table ====
| Pos | Team | Pld | W | D | L | GF | GA | GD | Pts | Qualification | KÖLN | MPT | STA | COR | AAR |
|---|---|---|---|---|---|---|---|---|---|---|---|---|---|---|---|
| 1 | (Germany) Köln | 4 | 3 | 1 | 0 | 9 | 2 | +7 | 10 | Advanced to semi-finals | — | — | 1–1 | — | 3–0 |
| 2 | (Israel) Maccabi Petah Tikva | 4 | 1 | 2 | 1 | 2 | 3 | −1 | 5 | | 1–3 | — | — | 0–0 | — |
| 3 | (Belgium) Standard Liège | 4 | 0 | 4 | 0 | 1 | 1 | 0 | 4 | | — | 0–0 | — | — | 0–0 |
| 4 | (Republic of Ireland) Cork City | 4 | 0 | 3 | 1 | 0 | 2 | −2 | 3 | | 0–2 | — | 0–0 | — | — |
| 5 | (Switzerland) Aarau | 4 | 0 | 2 | 2 | 0 | 4 | −4 | 2 | | — | 0–1 | — | 0–0 | — |

Source: rsssf.com

The 1997 UEFA Intertoto Cup finals were won by three French teams Lyon, Bastia, and Auxerre. All three teams advanced to the UEFA Cup.

== Sources ==
- Switzerland 1997–98 at RSSSF
- FCA squad 1997–98 at arowa.ch

| Preceded by 1996–97 | FC Aarau seasons | Succeeded by 1998–99 |
