= 1996–97 FC Aarau season =

FC Aarau
1996–97 season
- Club president: Ernst Lämmli
- Head-coach: Martin Trümpler
- Stadium: Stadion Brügglifeld, Aarau
- 1996–97 NLA Qualifying phase: 4th of 12
- Championship group: 5th of 8
- 1996–97 Swiss Cup: Round 5
- 1996–97 UEFA Cup: First round
- Sepione Cup: Winners
- Top goalscorer: League: Patrick de Napoli (13); All: Patrick de Napoli (13)

The 1996–97 season was FC Aarau's 94th season in their existence, since their foundation in 1902. It was their fifteenth season in the top flight of Swiss football, following their promotion at the end of 1980–81 season. FCA played their home games in the Stadion Brügglifeld and the stadium is located on the southern outskirts of Aarau, in the territory of the neighboring municipality of Suhr. It is about one and a half kilometers from Aarau city center and the railway station.

== Overview ==
The local businessman and architect Ernst Lämmli was the club's chairman and patron at this time. He held this position since the AGM in 1989. Lämmli had appointed Martin Trümpler as head-coach for the previous season and Trümpler continued in this position for this season.

The FCA first team competed in this season's domestic first-tier 1996–97 Nationalliga A with the clear intention of reaching the championship group and again to qualify for the European competitions. To achieve this would mean they would have to finish the qualifying stage under the top eight teams. The team also competed in the 1996–97 Swiss Cup. The FCA team had ended the previous season in fourth position and because the Swiss Cup winners, Sion, had finished in second position in the league table, the fourth league position was a slot that qualified them to play in the 1996–97 UEFA Cup. Further, as title holders of the pre-season Sempione-Cup, FCA also entered this year's edition of this competition.

== Players ==
The following is the list of the FCA first team squad this season. It also includes players that were in the squad the day the domestic league season started, on 10 July 1996, but subsequently left the club after that date.

Note: Flags indicate national team as defined under FIFA eligibility rules; some limited exceptions apply. Players may hold more than one non-FIFA nationality.

No.	Pos.	Nation	Player
1	GK	SUI	Andreas Hilfiker (league games: 29)
—	GK	SUI	Ivan Benito (league games: 8)
—	DF	SUI	David Bader (league games: 34)
—	DF	SUI	Sven Christ (league games: 29)
—	MF	SUI	Marcel Heldmann (league games: 0)
—	DF	SUI	Marc Hodel (league games: 31)
—	DF	SUI	Bernd Kilian (league games: 20)
—	DF	SUI	Dejan Markovic (league games: 3)
—	DF	SUI	Frédéric Page (league games: 1)
—	DF	CRO	Mirko Pavličević (league games: 36)
—	DF	SUI	Beat Studer (league games: 35)
—	DF	SUI	Davide Zitola (league games: 1)
—	MF	SUI	Renato Brugnoli (league games: 30)

No.	Pos.	Nation	Player
—	MF	BUL	Ivo Georgiev (league games: 23)
—	MF	SUI	Elvir Melunović (league games: 8)
—	MF	SUI	Christof Oldani (league games: 14)
—	MF	NED	Lodewijk Roembiak (league games: 28)
—	MF	SUI	Remo Senn (league games: 4)
—	MF	POL	Dariusz Skrzypczak (league games: 32)
—	MF	SUI	Gerardo Viceconte (league games: 2)
—	MF	SUI	André Wiederkehr (league games: 26)
—	FW	MKD	Sasa Ciric (league games: 29)
—	FW	SUI	Patrick de Napoli (league games: 35)
—	FW	SUI	Samuel Drakopulos (league games: 4)
—	FW	LUX	Jeff Saibene (league games: 20)
—	FW	SUI	Remo Tovagliaro (league games: 2)
—	FW	SUI	Carmine Viceconte (league games: 5)

Players who left the squad

The following is the list of the FCZ first team players that left the squad during the previous season or in the off-season, before the new domestic season began. Note: Flags indicate national team as defined under FIFA eligibility rules; some limited exceptions apply. Players may hold more than one non-FIFA nationality.

No.	Pos.	Nation	Player
—	GK	SUI	Walter Müller (retired)
—	DF	SUI	Moritz Gnehm (to FC Muri)
—	DF	SUI	Daniel Wyss (to Luzern)

No.	Pos.	Nation	Player
—	MF	BRA	Ratinho (to 1. FC Kaiserslautern)
—	FW	SUI	Adrian Allenspach (to FC St. Gallen)
—	FW	SUI	Philipp Andris (to FC Wangen bei Olten)
—	FW	SUI	Daniel Krenn (to FC Baden)

== Results ==
Legend

Win Draw Loss Postponed

=== Nationalliga A ===
==== Qualification phase ====
The first stage of the NLA began on 10 July 1996 and was completed on 1 December. The top eight teams in the qualification phase would advance to the championship group and the last four teams would play against relegation.

10 July 1996 Round 1	Aarau	0–1	Basel	Stadion Brügglifeld, Aarau
20:00	Georgiev (yellow card) 89'	FCB summary FCA summary	58' (0:1) La Placa; (yellow card) 74' Smajić	Attendance: 7,900; Referee: (Switzerland) Dieter Schoch (Attiswil)
Note: FCA were without Heldmann, Kilian, Skrzypczak, Zitola (all injured) and Benito (suspended). Basel were without Sutter (injured). Yakin was taken out with a concussion and Zuffi with a strain.

17 July 1996 Round 2	Zürich	1–1	Aarau	Letzigrund, Zürich
20:00	Di Jorio (red card) 25'; Nonda 45' (pen.)	FCZ summary FCA summary	(yellow card) 8' Bader; (yellow card) 13' B. Studer; (yellow card) 27' Skrzypczak; 60' (pen.) Wiederkehr	Attendance: 7,600; Referee: (Switzerland) Adrian Stalder (Oberburg, Bern)
Note: FCA were without Heldmann, Kilian and Zitola (all long-term injured).

20 July 1996 Round 3	Sion	1–0	Aarau	Stade Tourbillon, Sion
2:0	Vercruysse 32' (1:0); Rey (yellow card); Vercruysse (yellow card); Duruz (yellow card)	FCA summary	(yellow card) Studer; (yellow card) Wiederkehr	Attendance: 9,000; Referee: (Switzerland) Jürg Herrmann (Hinterkapplen (Wohlen bei Bern))
Note: FCA were without Heldmann, Kilian and Zitola (all long-term injured).

26 July 1996 Round 4	Aarau	0–1	Grasshopper Club	Stadion Brügglifeld, Aarau
20:00	Pavličević (yellow card); Hodel (yellow card)	FCA summary	65' (0:1) Moldovan; (yellow card) Gren; (yellow card) Esposito	Attendance: 5,500; Referee: (Switzerland) Serge Muhmenthaler (Grenchen)
Note: FCA were without Heldmann, Kilian and Zitola (all long-term injured).

30 July 1996 Round 5	Xamax	P–P	Aarau	Stade de la Maladière, Neuchâtel
		[ FCA summary]

2 August 1996 Round 6	Aarau	4–0	Lugano	Stadion Brügglifeld, Aarau
20:00	Hodel 34' (1:0); Wiederkehr 38' (pen.) de Napoli 45' (3:0); Ciric 84' (4:0)	FCA summary		Attendance: 3,100; Referee: (Switzerland) Dominique Tavel (Lonay)
Note: FCA were without Heldmann, Kilian and Zitola (all long-term injured). Fair game, no cautions.

10 August 1996 Round 7	Aarau	2–0	Lausanne-Sport	Stadion Brügglifeld, Aarau
20:00	de Napoli 8' (1:0) de Napoli 18' (2:0); Roembiak (yellow card); Brugnoli (yellow card); Wiederkehr (yellow card)	FCA summary	(yellow card) Thurre; (yellow card) Piffaretti	Attendance: 3,400; Referee: (Switzerland) Kurt Zuppinger (Bremgarten, Aargau)
Note: FCA were without Heldmann, Kilian and Zitola (all long-term injured).

16 August 1996 Round 8	Luzern	0–1	Aarau	Stadion Allmend, Luzern
20:00	Karpf (red card) 90'; Müller (yellow card); Sermeter (yellow card)	FCA summary	7' (0:1) de Napoli; (yellow card) Roembiak; (yellow card) de Napoli; (yellow card) Wiederkehr; (yellow card) Bader	Attendance: 12,100; Referee: (Switzerland) Dieter Schoch (Attiswil)
Note: FCA were without Heldmann, Kilian and Zitola (all long-term injured).

24 August 1996 Round 9	Aarau	1–0	Young Boys	Stadion Brügglifeld, Aarau
20:00	Ciric 81' (1:0)	FCA summary	(yellow card) Rotzetter; (yellow card) Eich	Attendance: 4,100; Referee: (Switzerland) Freddy Philippoz (Sion)
Note: FCA for the first time with Davide Zitola (substituted in the 90th minute) after his 8 month injury absence, but without Heldmann and Kilian (both long-term injured).

27 August 1996 Round 5	Xamax	2–0	Aarau	Stade de la Maladière, Neuchâtel
20:00	Sandjak 73' (1:0); Bonalair 78' (2:0); Rothenbühler (yellow card)	FCA summary	(yellow card) Roembiak; (yellow card) de Napoli	Attendance: 7,200; Referee: (Switzerland) Yvan Cornu
Note: Match rescheduled after postponement on 30 July. FCA without Heldmann and Kilian (both long-term injured) and without Zitola (recovering).

3 September 1996 Round 10	St. Gallen	1–1	Aarau	Espenmoos, St. Gallen
20:00	Allenspach 7' (pen.); Motaung (yellow card)	FCA summary	40' (1:1) de Napoli; (yellow card) Skrzypczak; (yellow card) Studer	Attendance: 6,500; Referee: (Switzerland) Dominique Tavel (Lonay)
Note: FCA without Heldmann, Kilian (both long-term injured) and without Zitola (recovering).

6 September 1996 Round 11	Aarau	1–1	Servette	Stadion Brügglifeld, Aarau
20:00	Georgiev 82' (1:0); Roembiak (yellow card) de Napoli (yellow card); Georgiev (yellow card); Brugnoli (yellow card)	FCA summary	87' (1:1) Ippoliti; (yellow card) Barberis; (yellow card) Pouget; (yellow card) Cantaluppi	Attendance: 3,700; Referee: (Switzerland) Kurt Zuppinger (Bremgarten, Aargau)
Note: FCA without Heldmann, Kilian and Zitola (all long-term injured).

14 September 1996 Round 12	Basel	2–0	Aarau	St. Jakob Stadium, Basel
20:00	Falub (yellow card) 4'; Armentano 18' (1:0); Armentano (yellow card) 18'; Nyarko 24' (2:0); Frick (yellow card) 90'	FCB summary FCA summary	(yellow card) 12' Bader; (yellow card) 66' Wiederkehr; (yellow card) 41' Christ	Attendance: 7,000; Referee: (Switzerland) Jürg Herrmann (Hinterkapplen (Wohlen bei Bern))
Note: FCB were without Moser and Konde (injured). FCA without Heldmann, Kilian and Zitola (all long-term injured), and De Napoli (suspended).

18 September 1996 Round 13	Aarau	2–1	Zürich	Stadion Brügglifeld, Aarau
20:00	Roembiak 32' (pen.); Ćirić 48' (2:0); Hodel (yellow card) 79'; Roembiak (yellow card) 90+1'	FCZ summary' FCA summary	(yellow card) 37' Nonda; 82' (2:1) Andersen	Attendance: 3,100; Referee: (Switzerland) Markus Nobs (Wohlen bei Bern)
Note: FCA without Heldmann, Kilian and Zitola (all long-term injured).

28 September 1996 Round 14	Aarau	P–P	Sion	Stadion Brügglifeld, Aarau
20:00		FCA summary

9 October 1996 Round 15	Grasshopper Club	0–0	Aarau	Hardturm, Zürich
20:00	Esposito (yellow card) (yellow-red card) 46'; Thüler (yellow card); Gämperle (yellow card)	FCA summary	(yellow card) Skrzypczak; (yellow card) Drakopulos; (yellow card) Pavličević; (yellow card) Wiederkehr	Attendance: 5,100; Referee: (Liechtenstein) Roland Beck (Triesenberg)
Note: FCA for the first time with Bernd Kilian (substituted in during the 87th minute) after his six month injury absence, but without Heldmann and Zitola (still both long-term injured).

12 October 1996 Round 16	Aarau	1–1	Xamax	Stadion Brügglifeld, Aarau
20:00	Hodel 38' (1:0)	FCA summary	68' (1:1) Bonalair	Attendance: 3,500; Referee: (Switzerland) Hans Stalder
Note: FCA without Heldmann and Zitola (both long-term injured). Fair game, no cautions.

19 October 1996 Round 17	Lugano	0–1	Aarau	Cornaredo, Lugano
17:30	Morf (yellow card); Bugnard (yellow card)	FCA summary	64' (0:1) Skrzypczak	Attendance: 1,600; Referee: (Switzerland) Karl Strässle (Steinach)
Note: FCA without Heldmann and Zitola (both long-term injured).

26 October 1996 Round 18	Lausanne-Sport	0–1	Aarau	Olympique de la Pontaise, Lausanne
20:00	Ohrel (yellow card)	FCA summary	78' (pen.) Roembiak; (yellow card) Hodel; (yellow card) Kilian; (yellow card) Roembiak	Attendance: 4,700; Referee: (Switzerland) Serge Muhmenthaler (Grenchen)
Note: FCA without Heldmann and Zitola (both long-term injured).

3 November 1996 Round 19	Aarau	0–0	Luzern	Stadion Brügglifeld, Aarau
14:30	Hodel (yellow card)	FCA summary	(yellow card) Fink	Attendance: 7,800; Referee: (Switzerland) Andreas Schluchter (Schönenbuch)
Note: FCA without Heldmann and Zitola (both long-term injured).

13 November 1996 Round 14	Aarau	0–0	Sion	Stadion Brügglifeld, Aarau
20:00	Wiederkehr (yellow card); Studer (yellow card)	FCA summary	(yellow card) Lonfat; (yellow card) Biaggi; (yellow card) Bertone	Attendance: 2,700; Referee: (Switzerland) Philippe Leuba (Chexbres)
Note: FCA without Heldmann and Zitola (both long-term injured).

17 November 1996 Round 20	Young Boys	1–1	Aarau	Wankdorf Stadium, Bern
14:30	Ivanov 20' (1:0); Prytz (yellow card)	FCA summary	50' (1:1) de Napoli	Attendance: 3,300; Referee: (Switzerland) Marcel Vollenweider (Rüti, Zürich)
Note: FCA without Heldmann and Zitola (both long-term injured).

24 November 1996 Round 21	Aarau	2–0	St. Gallen	Stadion Brügglifeld, Aarau
14:30	Ciric 37' (1:0) de Napoli 51' (2:0); Christ (yellow card)	FCA summary	(yellow card) Nyathi; (yellow card) Koch; (yellow card) Mouidi; (yellow card) Zwyssig	Attendance: 3,800; Referee: (Switzerland) Jürg Herrmann (Hinterkapplen (Wohlen bei Bern))
Note: FCA without Heldmann and Zitola (both long-term injured).

1 December 1996 Round 22	Servette	1–2	Aarau	Charmilles Stadium, Geneva
14:30	Pouget 37' (pen.)	FCA summary	28' (0:1) de Napoli; 30' (0:2) Ciric	Attendance: 7,500; Referee: (Switzerland) Kurt Zuppinger (Bremgarten, Aargau)
Note: FCA without Heldmann and Zitola (both long-term injured). Fair game, no cautions.

==== Qualification table ====
Pos	Team	Pld	W	D	L	GF	GA	GD	Pts	Qualification
1	Xamax	22	12	8	2	36	20	+16	44	Advance to championship round halved points (rounded up) as bonus
2	Grasshopper Club	22	10	9	3	42	27	+15	39	Advance to championship round halved points (rounded up) as bonus
3	Sion	22	9	10	3	33	21	+12	37	Advance to championship round halved points (rounded up) as bonus
4	Aarau	22	9	8	5	21	14	+7	35	Advance to championship round halved points (rounded up) as bonus
5	Lausanne-Sports	22	9	7	6	35	32	+3	34	Advance to championship round halved points (rounded up) as bonus
6	St. Gallen	22	6	10	6	20	26	−6	28	Advance to championship round halved points (rounded up) as bonus
7	Zürich	22	6	9	7	24	25	−1	27	Advance to championship round halved points (rounded up) as bonus
8	Basel	22	5	11	6	32	32	0	26	Advance to championship round halved points (rounded up) as bonus
9	Servette	22	5	9	8	24	25	−1	24	Continue to promotion/relegation round
10	Luzern	22	4	11	7	27	32	−5	23	Continue to promotion/relegation round
11	Lugano	22	2	9	11	14	32	−18	15	Continue to promotion/relegation round
12	Young Boys	22	3	3	16	17	39	−22	12	Continue to promotion/relegation round

Source: rsssf.com
Rules for classification: 1) Points; 2) Goal difference; 3) Goals scored; 4) Head-to-head points; 5) Away goals scored; 6) Draw.

==== Championship group ====
The first eight teams of the qualification phase competed in the Championship round. The teams took half of the points (rounded up to complete units) gained in the qualification as bonus with them. The championship group started on 2 March 1997 and was completed on 4 June.

2 March 1997 Round 1	Grasshopper Club	4–2	Aarau	Hardturm, Zürich
14:30	Türkyilmaz 13' (1:0); Yakin 28' (2:0); Moldovan 34' (3:0); Subiat 90+1' (4:2); Vogel (yellow card); Türkyilmaz (yellow card); Yakin (yellow card)	FCA summary	37' (3:1) Ciric; 85' (3:2) Ciric; (yellow card) Hilfiker; (yellow card) Saibene; (yellow card) Roembiak	Attendance: 8,200; Referee: (Switzerland) Markus Nobs (Wohlen bei Bern)
Note: FCA without Heldmann and Zitola (both long-term injured).

9 March 1997 Round 2	Aarau	2–1	Basel	Stadion Brügglifeld, Aarau
14:30	Christ (yellow card) 21'; Ćirić 66' (1:0); Bader (yellow card) 80'; Hodel 84' (2:1)	FCB summary FCA summary	(yellow card) 17' Falub; (yellow card) 44' (yellow-red card) 59' Foda; 79' (1:1) Giallanza; (yellow card) 87' H. Yakin	Attendance: 9,700; Referee: (Switzerland) Dieter Schoch (Attiswil)
Note: FCA without Heldmann and Zitola (injured). FCB without Frick, Orlando and Smajic (all injured). After Sutter's substitution, Henry played on the right of midfield. After Foda's dismissal, Nyarko in defense, Knup in midfield. 71st minute, Studer left the pitch with a torn capsule and ligaments, from then on Hodel was in defense, Brugnoli in midfield.

23 March 1997 Round 3	St. Gallen	0–0	Aarau	Espenmoos, St. Gallen
14:30	Mouidi (yellow card); Dal Santo (yellow card)	FCA summary	(yellow card) Skrzypczak; (yellow card) Saibene; (yellow card) Christ	Attendance: 9,000; Referee: (Switzerland) Andreas Schluchter (Schönenbuch)
Note: FCA without Heldmann and Zitola (both long-term injured).

26 March 1997 Round 4	Aarau	2–0	Lausanne-Sport	Stadion Brügglifeld, Aarau
20:00	Bader 49' (1:0) de Napoli 87' (2:0); Brugnoli (yellow card); Georgiev (yellow card)	FCA summary	(red card) 47' Triki; (yellow card) Piffaretti	Attendance: 3,600; Referee: (Switzerland) Claude Detruche (Thônex)
Note: FCA without Heldmann and Zitola (both long-term injured).

6 April 1997 Round 5	Zürich	0–0	Aarau	Letzigrund, Zürich
20:00	Nixon (yellow card) 49'	FCZ summary	(yellow card) 45' Hodel; (yellow card) 75' Pavlicevic	Attendance: 3,000; Referee: (Switzerland) Kurt Zuppinger (Bremgarten, Aargau)
Note: FCA without Heldmann and Zitola (both long-term injured).

13 April 1997 Round 6	Aarau	1–1	Sion	Stadion Brügglifeld, Aarau
14:30	de Napoli 23' (1:0); Roembiak (yellow card) de Napoli (yellow card)	FCA summary	39' (1:1) Zambaz; (yellow card) Quentin; (yellow card) Meyrieu; (yellow card) Wicky	Attendance: 6,200; Referee: (Switzerland) Serge Muhmenthaler (Grenchen)
Note: FCA without Heldmann and Zitola (both long-term injured).

19 April 1997 Round 7	Xamax	2–1	Aarau	Stade de la Maladière, Neuchâtel
20:00	Leśniak 18' (1:0) (Roembiak) 40' (og. 2:1); Gigon (yellow card)	FCA summary	37' (1:1) de Napoli; (yellow card) Christ; (yellow card) Skrzypczak; (yellow card) Saibene	Attendance: 7,200; Referee: (Switzerland) Jürg Herrmann (Hinterkapplen (Wohlen bei Bern))
Note: FCA without Heldmann and Zitola (both long-term injured).

24 April 1997 Round 8	Aarau	2–3	Xamax	Stadion Brügglifeld, Aarau
20:00	Skrzypczak 15' (1:1) de Napoli 30' (2:1); Markovic (yellow card); Skrzypczak (yellow card)	FCA summary	1' (0:1) Kunz; 34' (2:2) Kunz; 78' (2:3) Jeanneret; (yellow card) Rothenbühler; (yellow card) Bonalair	Attendance: 4,100; Referee: (Switzerland) Andreas Schluchter (Schönenbuch)
Note: FCA without Heldmann and Zitola (both long-term injured).

3 May 1997 Round 9	Sion	2–3	Aarau	Stade Tourbillon, Sion
20:00	Meyrieu 36' (1:0); Lukić 67' (pen.); Quentin (yellow card) (yellow-red card) 70'; Biaggi (yellow card)	FCA summary	63' (1:1) Hodel; 79' (pen.) Roembiak; 87' (2:3) de Napoli; (yellow card) Saibene; (yellow card) Brugnoli	Attendance: 13,000; Referee: (Switzerland) Carlo Bertolini (Vira-Gambarogno)
Note: FCA without Heldmann and Zitola (both long-term injured).

10 May 1997 Round 10	Aarau	1–1	Zürich	Stadion Brügglifeld, Aarau
20:00	Pavlicevic 24' (1:0)	FCZ summary	(yellow card) 21' (yellow-red card) 51' Mazzarelli; 89' (1:1) Tejeda	Attendance: 4,100; Referee: (Switzerland) Dominique Tavel (Lonay)
Note: FCA without Heldmann and Zitola (both long-term injured).

15 May 1997 Round 11	Lausanne-Sport	2–0	Aarau	Olympique de la Pontaise, Lausanne
20:00	Ohrel 76' (pen.); Thurre 86' (2:0); Thurre (yellow card)	FCA summary	(yellow card) Markovic; (yellow card) Bader; (yellow card) Skrzypczak	Attendance: 3,700; Referee: (Switzerland) Dieter Schoch (Attiswil)

24 May 1997 Round 12	Aarau	1–2	St. Gallen	Stadion Brügglifeld, Aarau
20:00	Ciric 55' (1:1)	FCA summary	37' (o.g.) (Studer); 70' (1:2) Vurens; (yellow card) Zwyssig; (yellow card) Dal Santo	Attendance: 2,600; Referee: (Switzerland) Yvan Cornu

31 May 1997 Round 13	Basel	3–2	Aarau	St. Jakob Stadium, Basel
20:00	Giallanza 49' (1:0); Knup 54' (2:0); Knup 60' (3:0); Ceccaroni (yellow card) 72'	FCB summary FCA summary	77' (3:1) Brugnoli; 90+1' (3:2) Kilian	Attendance: 6,000; Referee: (Switzerland) Werner Müller (Obererlinsbach)
Note: FCB without Konde, Schupp (both suspended), Poulard, Salvi, Grüter, Henry, Disseris, and Orlando (all injured). FCA without Heldmann, Kirik, Wiederkehr, and Saibene (all injured). 72nd minute: Viceconte substituted out due to injury. Last NLA match for referee Müller. No official farewell for the FCB players, who are already confirmed to be leaving today.

4 June 1997 Round 14	Aarau	0–1	Grasshopper Club	Stadion Brügglifeld, Aarau
20:00		FCA summary	25' (0:1) Türkyilmaz; (yellow card) Lombardo; (yellow card) Magnin; (yellow card) Türkyilmaz	Attendance: 4,300; Referee: (Liechtenstein) Roland Beck (Triesenberg)

==== Final league table ====
Pos	Team	Pld	W	D	L	GF	GA	GD	BP	Pts	Qualification
1	Sion	14	9	3	2	18	10	+8	19	49	Swiss champions, qualified for 1997–98 Champions League
2	Xamax	14	6	6	2	22	14	+8	22	46	qualified for 1997–98 UEFA Cup
3	Grasshopper Club	14	7	4	3	37	18	+19	20	45	qualified for 1997–98 UEFA Cup
4	Lausanne-Sports	14	8	2	4	20	16	+4	17	43	entered 1997 UEFA Intertoto Cup
5	Aarau	14	3	4	7	17	22	−5	18	31	entered 1997 UEFA Intertoto Cup
6	St. Gallen	14	3	4	7	13	26	−13	14	27	
7	Zürich	14	1	7	6	9	18	−9	14	24	
8	Basel	14	3	2	9	16	28	−12	13	24	

Source: rsssf.com
Rules for classification: 1) points; 2) Position in the qualification.

Sion won the league championship and this was their second championship win the club's history.

=== Swiss Cup ===
The first-tier clubs from the 1994–95 NLA were granted byes for the first two rounds, eight of these teams joined the competition in the third round. The four clubs that were competing in the UEFA European competitions, Grasshopper Club (1996–97 Champions League), Xamax, Aarau (both 1996–97 UEFA Cup) and Sion (1996–97 Cup Winners' Cup) were granted byes for the third round as well and entered the competition in the fourth round. The eight participating first-tier teams were seeded and cound not be drawn against each other. The draw respected regionalities, when possible, and the lower classed team was granted home advantage.

6 March 1997 Round 4	Zug 94	1–4	Aarau	Herti Allmend Stadion, Zug
	Baumann 81' (1:4)	FCA summary	24' (0:1) Ćirić; 73' (0:2) Ćirić; 76' (0:3) Ćirić; 78' (0:4) Saibene	Attendance: 1,400; Referee: (Switzerland) Massimo Busacca (Monte Carasso/Bellinzona)

29 March 1997 Round 5	FC Schaffhausen	0–0 (a.e.t.) (3–1 p)	Aarau	Stadion Breite, Schaffhausen
		FCA summary		Attendance: 1,693; Referee: (Switzerland) Erwin Fölmli
	Penalties
	Gerstenmájer (penalty scored); Stübi (penalty missed); Bossi (penalty missed); Meier (penalty scored); Marongi (penalty scored)		(penalty scored) Roembiak; (penalty missed) Pavličević; (penalty missed) Wiederkehr; (penalty missed) Kilian

Sion won the cup and this was the club's ninth cup title to this date and their third cup win in succession. Because they had secured the league championship just a few days earlier, they had completed the domestic double for the first time in the club's history.

=== UEFA Cup ===
==== Qualifying round ====
6 August 1996 1st leg	Aarau (Switzerland)	4–0	(Estonia) Lantana Tallinn	Stadion Brügglifeld, Aarau
20:00	Georgiev 21'; Skrzypczak 55'; Pavličević 76', 86' (pen.)	UEFA Report; FCA summary		Attendance: 3,500; Referee: Mateo Beusan (Croatia)

20 August 1996 2nd leg	Lantana Tallinn (Estonia)	2–0 (2–4 agg.)	(Switzerland) Aarau	Kadriorg Stadium, Tallinn
17:00	Lebret 82'; Hepner 88'	Report; FCA summary		Attendance: 1,500 (250 paying spectators); Referee: Jon Skjervold (Norway)
Note: Aarau won 4–2 on aggregate.

==== First round ====
10 September 1996 1st leg	Brøndby (Denmark)	5–0	(Switzerland) Aarau	Brøndby Stadion, Brøndbyvester
20:05	Vilfort 21' (pen.); Bjur 56' (2:0); Møller 66' (3:0); Møller 87' (4:0); Møller 89' (5:0)	Report; FCA summary		Attendance: 8,976; Referee: Hugh Dallas (Scotland)

24 September 1996 2nd leg	Aarau (Switzerland)	0–2 (0–7 agg.)	(Denmark) Brøndby	Stadion Brügglifeld, Aarau
20:00		Report; FCA summary	39' Møller; 90' (pen.) Daugaard	Attendance: 2,010; Referee: Leslie Irvine (Northern Ireland)
Note: Brøndby won 7–0 on aggregate.

German side Schalke 04, who beat Internazionale of Italy on penalties after the two-legged final finished 1–1 on aggregate, became winners of the 26th UEFA Cup competition.

=== Sempione Cup ===
2 July 1996 Semi-final	Aarau	1–0	SR Delémont	Sportplatz Moos, Balsthal
	(1:0)	[ FCA summary]
Note: The Sempione Cup was a club tournament played in summer at Sportanlage Moos, Balsthal, during the years 1987 to 2004.

5 July 1996 Final	St. Gallen	0–1	Aarau	Sportplatz Moos, Balsthal
		[ FCA summary]	78' (0:1) Hodel

Aarau won the Sempione Cup for the third time in a row.

== Sources ==
- Switzerland 1996–97 at RSSSF
- FCA squad 1996–97 at arowa.ch

Preceded by 1995–96	FC Aarau seasons	Succeeded by 1997–98
