= 1995–96 FC Aarau season =

FC Aarau
1995–96 season
- Club president: Ernst Lämmli
- Head-coach: Martin Trümpler
- Stadium: Stadion Brügglifeld, Aarau
- 1995–96 NLA Qualifying phase: 7th of 12
- Championship group: 4th of 8
- 1995–96 Swiss Cup: Quarter-final
- 1995 UEFA Intertoto Cup: Round of 16
- Sepione Cup: Winners
- Top goalscorer: League: Adrian Allenspach (9); Ratinho (9); All: Adrian Allenspach (11); Ratinho (11); Dariusz Skrzypczak (11)

The 1995–96 season was FC Aarau's 93rd season in their existence, since their foundation in 1902. It was their fourteenth season in the top flight of Swiss football, following their promotion at the end of 1980–81 season. FCA played their home games in the Stadion Brügglifeld and the stadium is located on the southern outskirts of Aarau, in the territory of the neighboring municipality of Suhr. It is about one and a half kilometers from Aarau city center and the railway station.

== Overview ==
The local businessman and architect Ernst Lämmli was the club's chairman and patron at this time. He held this position since the AGM in 1989. Three seasons earlier, Lämmli had appointed the Austrian Rolf Fringer as head-coach but his contract now came to an end. After achieving the championship title in his first season with the team and qualifing for the UEFA Cup in the following season, this had been a very successfuk period. Lämmli appointed Martin Trümpler as new head-coach. Trümpler had previously been head-coach for FC Thun, BSC Young Boys and the previous season for Lausanne-Sport.

The FCA first team competed in this season's domestic first-tier 1995–96 Nationalliga A with the clear intention of reaching the championship group and again to qualify for the European competitions. To achieve this would mean they would have to finish the qualifying stage under the top eight teams. The team also competed in the 1995–96 Swiss Cup. The first-tier teams from the NLA were granted byes for the first two cup rounds, eight of them joined the competition in round three.

The team had not qualified for the UEFA-competitions, but they did enter the 1995 UEFA Intertoto Cup. Further, as title holders of the pre-season Sempione-Cup FCA also entered this years edition of this competition.

== Players ==
The following is the list of the FCA first team squad this season. It also includes players that were in the squad the day the domestic league season started, on 27 July 1994, but subsequently left the club after that date.

Note: Flags indicate national team as defined under FIFA eligibility rules; some limited exceptions apply. Players may hold more than one non-FIFA nationality.

No.	Pos.	Nation	Player
1	GK	SUI	Andreas Hilfiker (league games: 32)
—	GK	SUI	Walter Müller (league games: 4)
—	DF	SUI	David Bader (league games: 29)
—	DF	SUI	Sven Christ (league games: 32)
—	DF	SUI	Moritz Gnehm (league games: 1)
—	DF	SUI	Bernd Kilian (to league games: 27)
—	DF	SUI	Dejan Markovic (league games: 25)
—	DF	CRO	Mirko Pavličević (league games: 35)
—	DF	SUI	Beat Studer (league games: 33)
—	DF	SUI	Daniel Wyss (league games: 32)
—	DF	SUI	Davide Zitola (league games: 5)

No.	Pos.	Nation	Player
—	MF	SUI	Renato Brugnoli (league games: 5)
—	MF	SUI	Marcel Heldmann (league games: 14)
—	MF	BRA	Ratinho (league games: 32)
—	MF	SUI	Remo Senn (league games: 25)
—	MF	POL	Dariusz Skrzypczak (league games: 34)
—	MF	SUI	André Wiederkehr (league games: 28)
—	FW	SUI	Adrian Allenspach (league games: 26)
—	FW	SUI	Philipp Andris (league games: 1)
—	FW	MKD	Sasa Ciric (league games: 31)
—	FW	SUI	Daniel Krenn (league games: 0)
—	FW	LUX	Jeff Saibene (league games: 32)

Players who left the squad

The following is the list of the FCZ first team players that left the squad during the previous season or in the off-season, before the new domestic season began.

Note: Flags indicate national team as defined under FIFA eligibility rules; some limited exceptions apply. Players may hold more than one non-FIFA nationality.

No.	Pos.	Nation	Player
—	MF	SUI	Patrick Bühlmann (to Sion)
—	MF	SUI	Michael Mazenauer (retired)
—	FW	SUI	Reto Burri (to Kriens)

No.	Pos.	Nation	Player
—	FW	SUI	Martin Fink (to Luzern)
—	FW	SUI	Joris Gratwohl (retired)
—	FW	SUI	Andreas Höhener (retired)
—	FW	POL	Cezary Kucharski (to Legia Warsaw)

== Results ==
Legend

Win Draw Loss Postponed

=== Nationalliga A ===
==== Qualification phase ====
The first stage of the NLA began on 19 July 1995 and was completed on 10 December. The top eight teams in the qualification phase would advance to the championship group and the last four teams would play against relegation.

19 July 1995 Round 1	Aarau	2–0	Zürich	Stadion Brügglifeld, Aarau
19:30	Wiederkehr 6' (1:0); Saibene (yellow card) 40'; Brugnoli (yellow card) 55'; Wiederkehr 56' (2:0); Markovic (yellow card) 78'	FCA summary FCZ summary	(yellow card) 18' Tarone; (yellow card) 30' Fischer; (yellow card) 82' Hoeks	Attendance: 5,600; Referee: (Switzerland) Andreas Schluchter (Schönenbuch)

22 July 1995 Round 2	Luzern	P–P	Aarau	Stadion Allmend, Luzern
16:00		FCA summary		Referee: (Switzerland) Hans Müller (Bern)
Note: Match postponed, so that Aarau could play the game against Uni Cluj in the last group match of the Intertoto Cup.

26 July 1995 Round 2	Luzern	3–0	Aarau	Stadion Allmend, Luzern
20:00	Aleksandrov 95' (1:0); Fink 67' (2:0); Aleksandrov 85' (3:0); Joller (yellow card); Gmür (yellow card)	FCA summary	(yellow card) Pavličević	Attendance: 11,000; Referee: (Switzerland) Hans Müller (Bern)
Note: Match rescheduled from the previous Saturday.

29 July 1995 Round 3	Grasshopper Club	P–P	Aarau	Hardturm, Zürich
		FCA summary
Note: Match postponed, so that Aarau could play the game against Karlsruhe in the round of 16 in the Intertoto Cup.

2 August 1995 Round 4	Aarau	0–0	Young Boys	Stadion Brügglifeld, Aarau
19:30	Saibene (red card) 85'	FCA summary	(yellow card) 35' Christensen; (yellow card) 59' Reto Gertschen; (yellow card) 83' Aebi	Attendance: 5,200; Referee: (Switzerland) Hans Stalder

5 August 1995 Round 5	Sion	2–1	Aarau	Stade Tourbillon, Sion
20:00	Kombouaré 28' (pen.); Vercruysse (yellow card) (yellow-red card) 87'; Kombouaré 90+1' (2:1)	FCA summary	(yellow card) (yellow-red card) 41' Studer; 73' (pen.) Wyss	Attendance: 9,800; Referee: (Switzerland) Kurt Zuppinger (Bremgarten, Aargau)

19 August 1995 Round 6	Aarau	2–4	Servette	Stadion Brügglifeld, Aarau
19:30	Markovic 1' (1:0); Ciric 23' (2:1)	FCA summary	7' (1:1) Neuville; 27' (2:2) Sesa; 64' (2:3) Neuville; 81' (2:4) Sesa; (yellow card) (yellow-red card) 84' Ippoliti; (yellow card) Juárez	Attendance: 5,700; Referee: (Switzerland) Karl Strässle (Steinach)

26 August 1995 Round 7	Lugano	2–0	Aarau	Cornaredo, Lugano
20:30	Carrasco 70' (1:0); Erceg 87' (2:0); Penzavalli (yellow card)	FCA summary	(yellow card) Christ	Attendance: 3,700; Referee: (Switzerland) Erwin Fölmli

29 August 1995 Round 8	Aarau	2–0	Basel	Stadion Brügglifeld, Aarau
19:30	Markovic 24' (1:0); Wyss (yellow card) 54'; Markovic (yellow card) 55'; Ratinho (yellow card) 62'; Allenspach 90+2' (2:0)	FCB summary FCA summary	(yellow card) 21' Okolosi; (yellow card) 29' Walker; (yellow card) 33' Tabakovic	Attendance: 6,800; Referee: (Switzerland) Freddy Philippoz (Sion)
Note: FCA played without the injured or sick Brugnoli, Heldmann, and Skrzypczak; FCB without the injured Cantaluppi, Disseris, Schreiber, Zuffi, Moser, Nyarko, and Orlando. Daniel Wyss was honored for his 200th league appearance with FC Aarau.

8 September 1995 Round 9	Xamax	3–2	Aarau	Stade de la Maladière, Neuchâtel
20:00	Isabella 11' (1:1); Moldovan 41' (2:2); Moldovan 61' (3:2)	FCA summary	10' (1:0) Senn; 34' (1:2) Ratinho	Attendance: 6,700; Referee: (Switzerland) Pierre-Alain Vuillemin (Geneva)
Note: Fair game, no cautions

16 September 1995 Round 10	Lausanne-Sport	0–2	Aarau	Olympique de la Pontaise, Lausanne
19:30		FCA summary	22' (0:1) Skrzypczak; 90+1' (0:2) Allenspach	Attendance: 4,200; Referee: (Switzerland) Andreas Schluchter (Schönenbuch)
Note: No yellow cards

19 September 1995 Round 11	Aarau	5–1	St. Gallen	Stadion Brügglifeld, Aarau
19:30	Ciric 14' (1:0); Senn 19' (2:1); Skrzypczak 22' (3:1); Kilian; Skrzypczak 51' (pen.); Allenspach (yellow card)	FCA summary	11' (pen.) Fonseca; (yellow card) Winkler	Attendance: 3,100; Referee: (Switzerland) Erwin Fölmli

23 September 1995 Round 3	Grasshopper Club	2–1	Aarau	Hardturm, Zürich
17:00	Viscaal 11' (1:0) de Napoli 53' (2:0)	FCA summary	72' (2:1) Ciric	Attendance: 4,650; Referee: (Switzerland) Claude Detruche (Thônex)
Note: The match was originally scheduled for 29 July 1995, but was postponed so that Aarau could play the game against Karlsruhe in the round of 16 in the Intertoto Cup and rescheduled.

30 September 1995 Round 12	Zürich	1–1	Aarau	Letzigrund, Zürich
16:00	Güntensperger (yellow card) 40'; Nixon 64' (1:1); Di Jorio (yellow card) 85'	FCZ summary	(yellow card) 34' Senn; 53' (0:1) Allenspach; (yellow card) 74' Saibene	Attendance: 3,500; Referee: (Switzerland) Freddy Philippoz (Sion)

3 October 1995 Round 13	Aarau	1–1	Luzern	Stadion Brügglifeld, Aarau
19:30	Ratinho 38' (1:1)	FCA summary	39' (0:1) Aleksandrov; (yellow card) Seoane; (yellow card) Knez	Attendance: 5,700; Referee: (Switzerland) Kurt Zuppinger (Bremgarten, Aargau)

15 October 1995 Round 14	Aarau	1–1	Grasshopper Club	Stadion Brügglifeld, Aarau
14:30	Skrzypczak 79' (1:1); Allenspach (yellow card); Pavličević (yellow card)	FCA summary	50' (0:1) Comisetti; (yellow card) Vogel; (yellow card) Comisetti; (yellow card) Thüler; (yellow card) Gämperle	Attendance: 7,400; Referee: (Switzerland) Serge Muhmenthaler (Grenchen)

21 October 1995 Round 15	Young Boys	0–4	Aarau	Wankdorf Stadium, Bern
17:30	Streun (red card) 13'	FCA summary	14' (pen.) Ratinho; 26' (0:2) Christ; 66' (0:3) Ratinho; 87' (0:4) Skrzypczak	Attendance: 1,800; Referee: (Switzerland) Claude Detruche (Thônex)

29 October 1995 Round 16	Aarau	0–1	Sion	Stadion Brügglifeld, Aarau
14:30	Saibene (yellow card)	FCA summary	60' (0:1) Mirandinha; (yellow card) (yellow-red card) 90' Quentin; (yellow card) Fournier; (yellow card) Zambaz	Attendance: 4,900; Referee: (Liechtenstein) Roland Beck (Triesenberg)

5 November 1995 Round 17	Servette	2–1	Aarau	Charmilles Stadium, Geneva
14:30	Fernandez 12' (1:0); Neuville 32' (2:0); Barea (yellow card)	FCA summary	84' (pen.) Wyss; (yellow card) Bader	Attendance: 3,800; Referee: (Switzerland) Kurt Zuppinger (Bremgarten, Aargau)

12 November 1995 Round 18	Aarau	5–0	Lugano	Stadion Brügglifeld, Aarau
14:30	Kilian 32' (1:0); Allenspach 45' (2:0); Allenspach 52' (3:0); Pavličević 73' (4:0); Ratinho 85' (5:0)	FCA summary	(yellow card) Englund	Attendance: 5,100; Referee: (Switzerland) Pierre-Alain Vuillemin (Geneva)

19 November 1995 Round 19	Basel	2–1	Aarau	St. Jakob Stadium, Basel
14:30	Sutter 12' (1:0); Olsen (yellow card) 40'; Nyarko (yellow card) 57'; Moser 83' (2:1)	FCB summary FCA summary	(yellow card) 26' Christ; 33' (1:1) Ratinho; (yellow card) 36' Skrzypczak; (yellow card) 38' Pavličević	Attendance: 13,000; Referee: (Switzerland) Karl Strässle (Steinach)
Note: FCB's first match with new head-coach Karl Engel. FCB without Meier (convalescent) and Walker (suspended). FCA without Heldmann, Brugnoli and reserve goalie Müller (all injured). Corner: 3:3 (1:2).

26 November 1995 Round 20	Aarau	2–2	Xamax	Stadion Brügglifeld, Aarau
14:30	Wiederkehr 47' (1:1); Ciric 79' (2:2); Studer (yellow card)	FCA summary	41' (0:1) Gigon; 61' (1:2) Bonalair; (yellow card) (yellow-red card) 90' Perret; (yellow card) Vernier; (yellow card) Kägi	Attendance: 5,200; Referee: (Switzerland) Jürg Herrmann (Hinterkapplen (Wohlen bei Bern))

3 December 1995 Round 21	Aarau	3–0	Lausanne-Sport	Stadion Brügglifeld, Aarau
14:30	Allenspach 45' (1:0); Ratinho 51' (2:0); Pavličević 77' (3:0); Allenspach (yellow card); Bader (yellow card)	FCA summary		Attendance: 4,900; Referee: (Switzerland) Serge Muhmenthaler (Grenchen)

10 December 1995 Round 22	St. Gallen	0–0	Aarau	Espenmoos, St. Gallen
14:30	Steingruber (yellow card); Milton (yellow card)	FCA summary	(yellow card) Ratinho; (yellow card) Wyss; (yellow card) Kilian	Attendance: 12,000; Referee: (Switzerland) Serge Muhmenthaler (Grenchen)

==== Qualification league table ====
Pos	Team	Pld	W	D	L	GF	GA	GD	Pts	Qualification
1	Grasshopper Club	22	13	4	5	38	22	+16	43	Advance to championship round halved points (rounded up) as bonus
2	Sion	22	13	3	6	37	28	+9	42	Advance to championship round halved points (rounded up) as bonus
3	Xamax	22	12	5	5	40	24	+16	41	Advance to championship round halved points (rounded up) as bonus
4	Luzern	22	11	7	4	36	25	+11	40	Advance to championship round halved points (rounded up) as bonus
5	Basel	22	9	3	10	23	29	−6	30	Advance to championship round halved points (rounded up) as bonus
6	Servette	22	7	7	8	28	28	0	28	Advance to championship round halved points (rounded up) as bonus
7	Aarau	22	7	6	9	36	27	+9	27	Advance to championship round halved points (rounded up) as bonus
8	St. Gallen	22	6	9	7	26	24	+2	27	Advance to championship round halved points (rounded up) as bonus
9	Lausanne-Sport	22	6	9	7	25	25	0	27	Continue to promotion/relegation round
10	Lugano	22	5	6	11	21	42	−21	21	Continue to promotion/relegation round
11	Zürich	22	4	6	12	17	32	−15	18	Continue to promotion/relegation round
12	Young Boys	22	4	5	13	14	35	−21	17	Continue to promotion/relegation round

Source: rsssf.com
Rules for classification: 1) Points; 2) Goal difference; 3) Goals scored; 4) Head-to-head points; 5) Away goals scored; 6) Draw.

==== Championship group ====
The first eight teams of the qualification phase competed in the Championship round. The teams took half of the points (rounded up to complete units) gained in the qualification as bonus with them. The championship group began on 25 February 1996 and was completed on 14 May.

25 February 1996 Round 1	Aarau	4–0	St. Gallen	Stadion Brügglifeld, Aarau
14:30	Ciric 8' (1:0); Allenspach 28' (2:0); Wiederkehr 42' (3:0); Ciric 84' (pen.); Skrzypczak (yellow card)	FCA summary	(yellow card) Leandro	Attendance: 5,100; Referee: (Switzerland) Kurt Zuppinger (Bremgarten, Aargau)

3 March 1996 Round 2	Grasshopper Club	0–0	Aarau	Hardturm, Zürich
14:30	Comisetti (yellow card); Türkyilmaz (yellow card); Vega (yellow card)	FCA summary	(yellow card) Studer	Attendance: 7,550; Referee: (Switzerland) Serge Muhmenthaler (Grenchen)

17 March 1996 Round 3	Aarau	2–2	Luzern	Stadion Brügglifeld, Aarau
14:30	Heldmann 29' (1:1); Ciric (penalty missed) 65′ Heldmann 86' (2:2); Skrzypczak (yellow card); Studer (yellow card)	FCA summary	5' (0:1) Aleksandrov; 42' (1:2) Aleksandrov; (yellow card) van Eck; (yellow card) Mutter	Attendance: 7,300; Referee: (Switzerland) Claude Detruche (Thônex)
Note: 65th minute, FCL goalkeeper Mutter held the penalty from Ciric.

24 March 1996 Round 4	Basel	1–3	Aarau	St. Jakob Stadium, Basel
14:30	Cantaluppi (yellow card) 22'; Orlando (yellow card) 29'; Nyarko 33' (1:1)	FCB summary FCA summary	20' (1:0) Studer; (yellow card) 21' Kilian; (yellow card) 22' Wyss; (yellow card) 40' Skrzypczak; 51' (1:2) Studer; 79' (1:3) Markovic	Attendance: 13,500; Referee: (Switzerland) Dieter Schoch (Attiswil)
Note: FCB without Walker, Disseris (both injured), Okolosi (fourth foreign player) and Moro (playing in the youth academy). FCA without Allenspach, Bader, Brugnoli, Müller, Wiederkehr and Zitola (all injured).

31 March 1996 Round 5	Servette	1–1	Aarau	Charmilles Stadium, Geneva
14:30	Ippoliti 58' (1:1); Duchosal (yellow card)	FCA summary	81' (1:1) Ciric; (yellow card) Markovic	Attendance: 3,800; Referee: (Switzerland) Karl Strässle (Steinach)

4 April 1996 Round 6	Aarau	3–2	Xamax	Stadion Brügglifeld, Aarau
20:00	(Rueda) 55' (o.g.); Kilian 59' (2:1); Pavličević 79' (3:1)	FCA summary	31' (0:1) Moldovan; 81' (3:2) Rueda	Attendance: 5,200; Referee: (Switzerland) Serge Muhmenthaler (Grenchen)
Note: Fair game, no cautions

14 April 1996 Round 7	Aarau	1–0	Sion	Stadion Brügglifeld, Aarau
14:30	Wyss 26' (1:0); Ciric (yellow card); Christ (yellow card)	FCA summary	(yellow card) Vidmar; (yellow card) Gaspoz	Attendance: 4,900; Referee: (Switzerland) Marcel Vollenweider (Rüti, Zürich)

18 April 1996 Round 8	Sion	2–0	Aarau	Stade Tourbillon, Sion
20:00	Quentin 29' (1:0); Giallanza 88' (2:0); Colombo (yellow card)	FCA summary		Attendance: 8,000; Referee: (Switzerland) Markus Nobs (Wohlen bei Bern)

21 April 1996 Round 9	Xamax	3–1	Aarau	Stade de la Maladière, Neuchâtel
16:30	Isabella 4' (1:0); Isabella 62' (2:1); Moldovan 86' (3:1)	FCA summary	26' (pen.) Wyss; (yellow card) Skrzypczak; (yellow card) Markovic	Attendance: 7,200; Referee: (Switzerland) Claude Detruche (Thônex)

27 April 1996 Round 10	Aarau	3–0	Servette	Stadion Brügglifeld, Aarau
19:30	Skrzypczak 18' (1:0); Ciric 50' (2:0); Ratinho 78' (3:0)	FCA summary		Attendance: 4,100; Referee: (Liechtenstein) Roland Beck (Triesenberg)
Note: Fair game, no cautions

30 April 1996 Round 11	Aarau	1–0	Basel	Stadion Brügglifeld, Aarau
19:30	Pavličević (yellow card) 10'; Ratinho 13' (1:0); Allenspach (yellow card) 56'; Bader (yellow card) 79'	FCB summary FCA summary	(yellow card) 9' Cantaluppi; (yellow card) 33' Rey	Attendance: 5,100; Referee: (Switzerland) Hans Stalder
Note: FCA without Brugnoli, Kilian and Müller (all injured); FCB without Hasler, Orlando (both injured) and Tabakovic (recovering). 35th minute, a clearance from FCA player Heldmann hits his own post. Dismissed Bayern coach Otto Rehhagel in the stands.

4 May 1996 Round 12	Luzern	4–0	Aarau	Stadion Allmend, Luzern
20:00	Aleksandrov 17' (1:0); Sawu 63' (2:0); Sawu 76' (3:0); Fink 77' (4:0); Müller (yellow card)	FCA summary	(yellow card) Studer; (yellow card) Christ	Attendance: 12,540; Referee: (Switzerland) Hans Müller (Bern)

11 May 1996 Round 13	Aarau	0–0	Grasshopper Club	Stadion Brügglifeld, Aarau
19:30		FCA summary	(yellow card) Pavlović; (yellow card) Koller	Attendance: 5,600; Referee: (Switzerland) Claude Detruche (Thônex)

14 May 1996 Round 14	St. Gallen	3–4	Aarau	Espenmoos, St. Gallen
20:00	Diallo 24' (1:1); Leandro 72' (2:4); Milton 78' (3:4)	FCA summary	6' (0:1) Allenspach; 27' (o.g.) (Tejeda); 31' (1:3) Allenspach; 35' (1:4) Wyss	Attendance: 3,500; Referee: (Switzerland) Serge Muhmenthaler (Grenchen)
Note: No cautions.

==== Final league table ====
Pos	Team	Pld	W	D	L	GF	GA	GD	BP	Pts	Qualification
1	Grasshopper Club	14	8	6	0	26	7	+19	22	52	Swiss champions, qualified for 1996–97 Champions League
2	Sion	14	8	2	4	20	14	+6	21	47	Swiss Cup winners, qualified for 1996–97 Cup Winners' Cup
3	Xamax	14	5	7	2	21	16	+5	21	43	qualified for 1996–97 UEFA Cup
4	Aarau	14	7	4	3	23	18	+5	14	39	qualified for 1996–97 UEFA Cup
5	Luzern	14	4	3	7	23	19	+4	20	35	entered 1996 UEFA Intertoto Cup
6	Basel	14	3	4	7	11	20	−9	15	28	entered 1996 UEFA Intertoto Cup
7	Servette	14	2	5	7	18	25	−7	14	25	
8	St. Gallen	14	2	3	9	11	34	−23	14	23	

Source: rsssf.com

Grasshopper Club won the championship title and this was GC's 24th title to this date.

=== Swiss Cup ===
The first-tier clubs from the 1994–95 Nationalliga A were granted byes for the first two rounds, eight of them joined the competition in this round The four clubs that were competing in the UEFA European competitions were granted byes for this round as well. The eight participating first-tier teams were seeded and cound not be drawn against each other. The draw respected regionalities, when possible, and the lower classed team was granted home advantage.

24 September 1996 Round 3	Zug 94	P–P	Aarau	Herti Allmend Stadion, Zug
		FCA summary
Note: Match was posponed and rescheduled.

8 October 1995 Round 3	Zug 94	0–3	Aarau	Herti Allmend Stadion, Zug
		FCA summary	29' (0:1) Pavličević; 85' (0:2) Skrzypczak; 88' (0:3) Ratinho	Attendance: 1,050; Referee: (Switzerland) Jürg Herrmann (Hinterkapplen (Wohlen bei Bern))

10 March 1996 Round 4	Aarau	1–0	FC Lugano	Stadion Brügglifeld, Aarau
	Kilian 75' (1:0)	FCA summary		Attendance: 3,600; Referee: (Switzerland) Andreas Schluchter (Schönenbuch)

21 March 1996 Round 5	Aarau	2–0	Zürich	Stadion Brügglifeld, Aarau
	Ćirić 1' (1:0); Ćirić (yellow card) 18'; Ćirić 57' (2:0)	FCA summary FCZ summary	(yellow card) 29' (yellow-red card) 72' Walker; (yellow card) 68' Nonda	Attendance: 2,800; Referee: (Switzerland) Kurt Zuppinger (Bremgarten, Aargau)

11 April 1996 Quarter-final	Aarau	1–4	Servette	Stadion Brügglifeld, Aarau
	Daniel Wyss 35' (pen.)	FCA summary Servette summary	8' (0:1) Neuville; 16' (0:2) Neuville; 37' (1:3) Neuville; 40' (1:4) Neuville	Attendance: 4,900; Referee: (Switzerland) Yvan Cornu

Servette advanced to the final. However, Sion won the cup beating them 3–2 in the final. This was Sion's 8th cup title to this date and it was their second cup win in a row.

=== Intertoto Cup ===
The 1995 UEFA Intertoto Cup was the first edition of the tournament administered by the UEFA. FCA were assigned to group three.

==== Group 3 matches ====
25 June 1995 Matchday 1	Aarau (Switzerland)	2–2	(Norway) Tromsø	Stadion Brügglifeld, Aarau
17:00	Kilian 73'; Wiederkehr 89'	FCA summary	Flo 61'; Berg Johansen 86'	Attendance: 2,430; Referee: Štefan Tivold (Slovenia)

2 July 1995 Matchday 2	Germinal Ekeren (Belgium)	3–3	(Switzerland) Aarau	Stadion Louis Lucas, Kapellen
16:00	Kinet 10'; Lukaku 16'; Radzinski 85'	FCA summary	Wiederkehr 20'; Wyss 21'; Allenspach 71'	Attendance: 1,500; Referee: Georg Dardenne (Germany)

16 July 1995 Matchday 4	Aarau (Switzerland)	6–1	(Faroe Islands) HB Tórshavn	Stadion Brügglifeld, Aarau
17:00	Skrzypczak 13', 26', 49', 54'; Wiederkehr 15'; Saibene 58'	FCA summary	Mohr 36'	Attendance: 1,610; Referee: Charles Schaak (Luxembourg)

23 July 1995 Matchday 5	Universitatea Cluj (Romania)	2–3	(Switzerland) Aarau	Stadionul Ion Moina, Cluj-Napoca
	Falub 58'; Șandru 74'	FCA summary Romaniasoccer.uv.ro/ Report	Ratinho 20'; Allenspach 67'; Wyss 76'	Attendance: 500; Referee: Zygmunt Ziober (Poland)

==== Final group table ====
Pos	Team	Pld	W	D	L	GF	GA	GD	Pts	Qualification	AAR	GER	TRO	TÓR	UCL
1	(Switzerland) Aarau	4	2	2	0	14	8	+6	8	Advanced to round of 16	—	—	2–2	6–1	—
2	(Belgium) Germinal Ekeren	4	2	2	0	10	5	+5	8		3–3	—	—	—	4–1
3	(Norway) Tromsø	4	2	1	1	13	4	+9	7		—	0–2	—	10–0	—
4	(Faroe Islands) HB Tórshavn	4	0	2	2	2	17	−15	2		—	1–1	—	—	0–0
5	(Romania) Universitatea Cluj	4	0	1	3	3	8	−5	1		2–3	—	0–1	—	—

Source: rsssf.com

==== Round of 16 ====
29 July 1995 Round of 16	Aarau (Switzerland)	1–2 (a.e.t.)	(Germany) Karlsruhe	Stadion Brügglifeld, Aarau
	Saibene 90+2' (1:1)	FCA summary Kicker summary	Schuster 87' (0:1); Knup 97' (1:2)	Attendance: 6,700; Referee: António José Almeida Marçal (Portugal)

Karlsruhe advanced to next round and then to the 1995–96 UEFA Cup#Preliminary round. Here they lost in the first round against Bordeaux.

=== Sempione Cup ===
8 July 1995 Semi-final	Aarau	3–0	Solothurn	Sportplatz Moos, Balsthal
	Markovic 21' (1:0); Wiederkehr 65' (2:0); Wiederkehr 87' (3:0)	[ FCA summary]
Note: The Sempione Cup was a club tournament played in summer at Sportanlage Moos, Balsthal, during the years 1987 to 2004.

12 July 1995 Final	Aarau	1–1 (6–5 p)	Young Boys	Sportplatz Moos, Balsthal
	Ratinho 84' (1:0)	[ FCA summary]	88' (1:1) Maiano
	Penalties
	Penalty scored		Penalty scored Penalty missed
Note: The Sempione Cup was a club tournament played in summer at Sportanlage Moos, Balsthal, during the years 1987 to 2004.

Aarau won the Sempione Cup for the second time in a row.

== Sources ==
- Switzerland 1995–96 at RSSSF
- FCA squad 1995–96 at arowa.ch

Preceded by 1994–95	FC Aarau seasons	Succeeded by 1996–97
