= Jean-Daniel Gross =

Swiss footballer and manager (born 1966)

Personal information
- Date of birth: 26 April 1966 (age 60)
- Place of birth: Fribourg, Switzerland
- Position: Defender

Senior career*
Years	Team	Apps	(Gls)
1989–1991	FC Fribourg		
1991–1993	Young Boys		
1993–1994	FC Bulle		
1994–2000	SC Kriens		
–2003	Zug 94		

Managerial career
- 2006–2007: SC Cham
- 2008: FC Luzern (caretaker)
- 2008–2012: FC Luzern II
- 2012–2014: SC Kriens
- * Club domestic league appearances and goals

Jean-Daniel Gross (born 26 April 1966) is a Swiss football manager and former player. In his playing career, which ended in 2003, he played for clubs including Young Boys and Zug 94.
