= James Derivaz =

Swiss footballer (born 1973)

Personal information
- Date of birth: 31 August 1973 (age 53)
- Place of birth: Martigny, Switzerland
- Height: 1.82 m (6 ft 0 in)
- Position: Forward

Senior career*
| Years | Team | Apps | (Gls) |
| 1991–1992 | FC Martigny-Sports | | |
| 1992–1993 | Servette | | |
| 1993–1994 | FC Monthey | | |
| 1994–1997 | FC Martigny-Sports | | |
| 1997–1999 | FC Sion | | |
| 1998 | → FC Stade Nyonnais (loan) | | |
| 1999–2000 | FC Stade Nyonnais | | |
| 2000–2001 | Étoile Carouge FC | | |
| 2001–2002 | FC Martigny-Sports | | |

Managerial career
- 2009–2010: FC Martigny-Sports (assistant)
- 2010–2012: FC Martigny-Sports
- * Club domestic league appearances and goals

James Derivaz (born 31 August 1973) is a Swiss former professional footballer who played as a forward. He managed FC Martigny-Sports.
