= Maurizio Melina =

Italian footballer

Personal information
- Date of birth: 15 July 1975 (age 51)
- Place of birth: Italy
- Height: 1.76 m (5 ft 9 in)
- Position: Striker

Senior career*
Years	Team	Apps	(Gls)
1992–1996	FC Luzern	22	(1)
1996–2006	SC Kriens	133	(34)
2002–2003	→ FC Sion (loan)	0	(0)
2006–2008	SC Cham	51	(11)
- * Club domestic league appearances and goals

Maurizio Melina (born 15 July 1975) is an Italian former footballer.

Melina started his career at FC Luzern in Swiss Super League. He then spent 10 seasons for SC Kriens in Swiss Challenge League, except on loan to FC Sion in Super League.

On 20 July 2006, he left for SC Cham in 1. Liga. He followed the club promoted in the next season.
