= Beat Mutter =

Swiss footballer (born 1962)

Personal information
- Date of birth: 22 July 1962 (age 64)
- Position: Goalkeeper

Senior career*
Years	Team	Apps	(Gls)
1986–1988	Servette FC		
1988–1990	AC Bellinzona		
1990–1997	FC Luzern		
- * Club domestic league appearances and goals

Beat Mutter (born 22 July 1962) is a retired Swiss football goalkeeper that played for Swiss football clubs Servette FC, AC Bellizona, and FC Luzern.
