= Ivo Georgiev =

Bulgarian footballer (1972–2021)

Personal information
- Full name: Ivo Georgiev Georgiev
- Date of birth: 12 May 1972
- Place of birth: Sofia, Bulgaria
- Date of death: 13 November 2021 (aged 49)
- Place of death: Sofia, Bulgaria
- Height: 1.82 m (6 ft 0 in)
- Position: Forward

Senior career*
Years	Team	Apps	(Gls)
1990–1993	Debrecen	68	(36)
1993	Dorogi Bányász	12	(1)
1994–1995	Korabostroitel	42	(38)
1995–1996	Spartak Varna	29	(21)
1996–1997	FC Aarau	28	(3)
1997	Levski Sofia	0	(0)
1998	Spartak Varna	13	(6)
1998–1999	Waldhof Mannheim	7	(0)
1999–2000	FC Aarau	10	(2)
2000	Dobrudzha	3	(1)
2001	Honvéd	17	(4)
2002	Botev Vratsa	8	(2)
Total		259	(138)

International career
1996	Bulgaria	1	(1)
- * Club domestic league appearances and goals

Ivo Georgiev (Bulgarian: Иво Георгиев; 12 May 1972 – 13 November 2021) was a Bulgarian professional footballer who played as a forward.

== Career ==
In his career Georgiev played for Volov Shumen, Debreceni VSC, Korabostroitel, Spartak Varna, FC Aarau, Levski Sofia, SV Waldhof Mannheim, Dobrudzha, Budapest Honvéd and Botev Vratsa.

In season 1995–96 Georgiev scored six goals for Spartak Varna in a Bulgarian league match against Spartak Plovdiv. In the same season he became top scorer of the league, scoring 21 goals.

For the Bulgaria national football team he was in roster for UEFA Euro 1996. He was capped once, scoring in his sole game.

== Death ==
Georgiev died from heart failure on 13 November 2021, at the age of 49.

== Career statistics ==
Scores and results list Bulgaria's goal tally first, score column indicates score after each Georgiev goal.

List of international goals scored by Ivo Georgiev
No.	Date	Venue	Opponent	Score	Result	Competition
1	28 May 1996	Vasil Levski National Stadium, Sofia, Bulgaria	(North Macedonia) Macedonia	3–0	3–0	Friendly match
