= Sascha Müller (footballer) =

Swiss footballer (born 1970)

Personal information
- Date of birth: 28 February 1970 (age 56)
- Position: Right midfielder

Senior career*
Years	Team	Apps	(Gls)
1990–1992	FC Brüttisellen		
1992–1994	FC Winterthur	64	(17)
1994–1995	FC St. Gallen	29	(0)
1995–1997	FC Luzern	28	(1)
1997–2003	FC St. Gallen	186	(17)
2003–2004	FC Herisau		

International career
1999–2001	Switzerland	6	(0)

Managerial career
- 2020–2022: Grasshopper Club Zürich (women)
- * Club domestic league appearances and goals

Sascha Müller (born 28 February 1970) is a retired Swiss football midfielder and current manager of Grasshopper Club Zürich women's team.

After retiring from playing football, Müller began his coaching career as a youth manager for St Gallen from 2005 until 2009. From 2009, he has moved to Grasshopper Zürich and coached the youth teams there until his appointment as their women's team manager in July 2020. On 22 March, he was appointed as the new talent manager of Grasshopper.

== Club career ==
Müller played over 300 games in his 14 year career, playing all of his club football in his native Switzerland. Müller started playing for FC Brüttisellen in 1990 in the second tier of Swiss football, Nationalliga B. After two seasons there, he moved to FC Winterthur for another two seasons in the second tier, before moving to St. Gallen for 1994-95 season. A disappointing season followed, where St. Gallen finished 11th in the league and after only one season Müller moved on again, this time to FC Luzern. Müller only made 28 appearances over two seasons for FC Luzern, so moved back to St. Gallen for the 1997-98 campaign.

Müller was part of the St. Gallen team that won the Nationalliga A in the 1999-00 season, making 31 appearances and scoring 5 goals in their title winning campaign. While at St. Gallen Müller memorably scored one of the goals as they overturned a 1-0 first leg deficit to win 2-0 in the second leg and eliminate Premier League side Chelsea from the 2000–01 UEFA Cup.

== International career ==
After two seasons where Müller was ever-present for his club team St. Gallen, he was called up to represent the Swiss national team. Müller made his debut in an international friendly against the Czech Republic, where he was used as a 69th minute substitute in their 3-0 defeat. The following month, Müller made his first competitive international appearance in the qualifying round for Euro 2000. He was used as a 77th minute substitute in Switzerland's 2-1 defeat to Denmark.

Müller also made an appearance in the qualifying round for the 2002 World Cup in a 5-0 victory over Luxembourg.

Müller made the starting line-up in one game for Switzerland, in a 4-0 friendly defeat to Poland in February 2001. He was used as substitute in all of his other international appearances.
