= Patrick Isabella =

Swiss footballer and manager (born 1971)

Personal information
- Date of birth: 25 January 1971 (age 55)
- Position: Midfielder

Senior career*
Years	Team	Apps	(Gls)
1987–1990	Yverdon Sport FC		
1990–1994	FC Lausanne-Sport		
1994–1999	Neuchâtel Xamax		
1999–2000	Grasshopper Club		
2000	Grazer AK		
2001	Sassuolo		
2001–2002	FC Wil 1900		
2002–2003	Yverdon Sport FC		
2003	FC Sion		
2003–2006	FC Lausanne-Sport		

Managerial career
- 2006–2007: FC Lausanne-Sport (co-manager)
- 2008–2011: FC Malley
- * Club domestic league appearances and goals

Patrick Isabella (born 25 January 1971) is a retired Swiss football midfielder and later manager.
