= Christof Oldani =

Swiss footballer (born 1974)

Personal information
- Date of birth: 3 February 1974 (age 52)
- Position: Midfielder

Senior career*
Years	Team	Apps	(Gls)
1992–1993	FC Wettingen		
1993–1996	FC Winterthur		
1996–1997	FC Aarau		
1997–2003	FC Baden		
- * Club domestic league appearances and goals

Christof Oldani (born 3 February 1974) is a retired Swiss football midfielder.
