= Adrian Allenspach =

Swiss footballer (born 1969)

Personal information
- Date of birth: 31 August 1969 (age 57)
- Place of birth: St. Gallen, Switzerland
- Height: 1.74 m (5 ft 9 in)
- Position: Forward

Senior career*
Years	Team	Apps	(Gls)
1988–1991	FC St. Gallen		
1991–1992	FC Winterthur		
1992–1995	FC Schaffhausen		
1995–1996	FC Aarau		
1996–1997	FC St. Gallen		
1997–1998	FC Lugano		
1998	FC Sion		
1999–2000	FC Wil 1900		

Managerial career
- 2007–2016: FC Tuggen
- 2017–: FC Tuggen
- * Club domestic league appearances and goals

Adrian Allenspach (born 31 August 1969) is a retired Swiss football striker.
