= Lodewijk Roembiak =

Dutch footballer (born 1969)

Personal information
- Full name: Lodewijk Paul Cornelius Roembiak
- Date of birth: 18 May 1969 (age 57)
- Place of birth: Leiden, Netherlands
- Height: 1.74 m (5 ft 9 in)
- Position: Midfielder

Senior career*
Years	Team	Apps	(Gls)
1987–1989	FC Den Haag	3	(0)
1989–1991	Sparta Rotterdam	19	(0)
1991–1993	Cambuur	62	(6)
1993	FC Zwolle	9	(0)
1993–1994	De Graafschap	25	(3)
1994–1995	Antalyaspor	15	(2)
1995–1996	SC Veendam	23	(4)
1996–1998	FC Aarau	59	(7)
1998–2000	Werder Bremen	18	(3)
2000	→ FC Aarau	11	(0)
2001	Waldhof Mannheim	3	(0)
Total		247	(25)
- * Club domestic league appearances and goals

Lodewijk "Lody" Roembiak (born 18 May 1969) is a Dutch former professional footballer who played as a midfielder for Bundesliga club Werder Bremen during the 1998–99 and 1999–2000 football seasons.

== Career ==
Born in Leiden, Roembiak made his professional debut for FC Den Haag in 1987. After just three appearances for the club, he joined Sparta Rotterdam. In the winter transfer window of the 1990–91 season, he moved to SC Cambuur. Following spells at FC Zwolle and De Graafschap, he signed for Turkish club Antalyaspor which he left for SC Veendam after just six months.

=== FC Aarau ===
In summer 1998, Roembiak joined FC Aarau where he went on to play two seasons.

=== Werder Bremen ===
In summer 1998, Roembiak signed for Bundesliga club Werder Bremen from FC Aarau for a transfer fee of DM 500,000. In August 1998, he assisted Dieter Frey for the single goal in Werder Bremen's 1–0 win over Vojvodina Novi Sad in the first leg of the 1998 UEFA Intertoto Cup final. After scoring three goals and making three assists in the first half of the 1998–99 season, he suffered an injury to his patellar tendon in the winter break; the injury required surgery in April 1999, keeping him out of action until the end of the season.

In the 1998–99 season Roembiak made just two substitute appearances under manager Felix Magath. He was unable to regain his position in the starting lineup under new manager Thomas Schaaf and was loaned back to FC Aarau for the second half of the 1999–2000 season, where he played in 11 matches. In January 2001, Roembiak joined 2. Bundesliga side Waldhof Mannheim for the remainder of the season. He left Werder permanently in summer 2001, having scored three goals in 18 appearances in the Bundesliga. During his spell at Werder Bremen, he became a popular player and was given the nicknames "Lody" and "Kugel" ("ball").

=== Later years ===
In September 2001, he went on trial at Fortuna Sittard but the club chose not to sign him.

He later returned to former club SC Cambuur and also played for LVV Friesland.
