= Blaise Piffaretti =

Swiss footballer and coach (born 1966)

Personal information
- Date of birth: 9 March 1966 (age 60)
- Place of birth: Saint-Léonard, Switzerland
- Height: 1.73 m (5 ft 8 in)
- Position: Midfielder

Senior career*
Years	Team	Apps	(Gls)
1984–1993	FC Sion	245	(17)
1993–1995	Neuchâtel Xamax	49	(5)
1995–1999	FC Lausanne-Sport	125	(4)
2001–2005	FC Sion	118	(2)
Total		537	(28)

International career
- Switzerland u-21
1988–1996	Switzerland	23	(0)

Managerial career
- 2007–2008: FC Sion (coach)
- 2010–2011: FC Sion (coach)
- * Club domestic league appearances and goals

Blaise Piffaretti (born 9 March 1966) is a retired Swiss football midfielder and later coach.

== Honours ==
=== Player ===
FC Sion

- Swiss Championship: 1991–92
- Swiss Cup: 1985–86, 1990–91
