= Dejan Markovic (Swiss footballer) =

Swiss footballer (born 1975)

Personal information
- Date of birth: 21 April 1975 (age 51)
- Position: Midfielder

Senior career*
Years	Team	Apps	(Gls)
1992–1993	FC Wettingen		
1993–2000	FC Aarau		
1996	→ Yverdon Sport FC		
1999	→ FC Solothurn		
2001–2002	SC YF Juventus		
2002–2005	FC Wohlen		
2005–2006	FC Baden		
2006–2007	FC Wangen bei Olten		
- * Club domestic league appearances and goals

Dejan Markovic (born 21 April 1975) is a retired Swiss football midfielder.
