= Thônex =

- Municipality
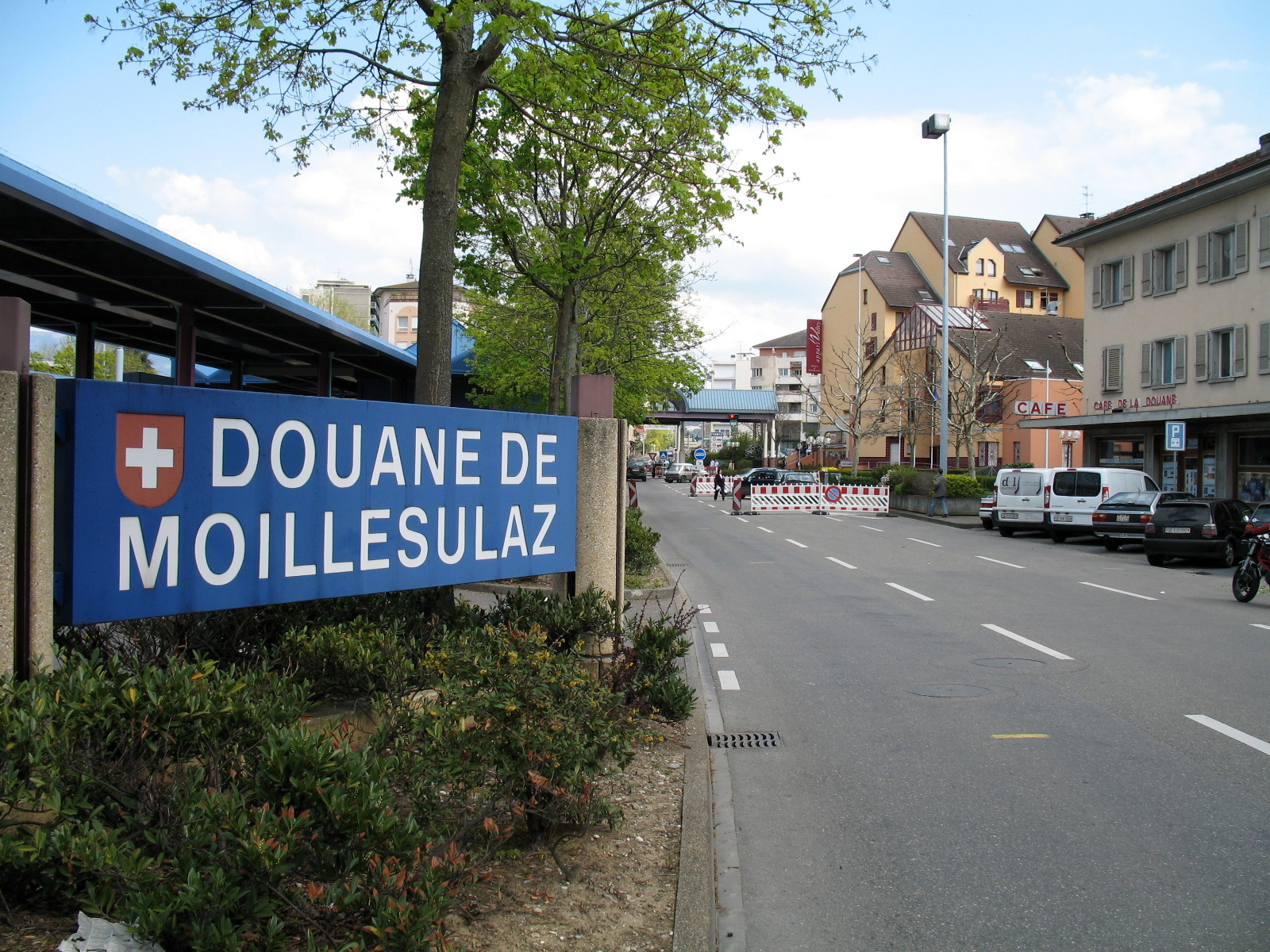

- Flag Coat of arms
- Location of Thônex
- Location within Switzerland Location within Canton of Geneva
- Coordinates: 46°11′N 06°11′E
- Country: Switzerland
- Canton: Geneva
- District: n.a.

Government
  - Mayor: Maire; Pascal Uehlinger

Area
  - Total: 3.84 km^{2} (1.48 sq mi)
- Elevation: 431 m (1,414 ft)

Population (December 2020)
  - Total: 14,573
  - Density: 3,800/km^{2} (9,830/sq mi)
- Time zone: UTC+01:00 (CET)
  - Summer (DST): UTC+02:00 (CEST)
- Postal code: 1226
- SFOS number: 6640
- ISO 3166 code: CH-GE
- Surrounded by: Ambilly (FR-74), Chêne-Bougeries, Chêne-Bourg, Choulex, Gaillard (FR-74), Puplinge, Vandœuvres, Veyrier
- Twin towns: Graveson (France)
- Website: www.thonex.ch

Thônex (French pronunciation: [tone]) is a municipality of the Canton of Geneva, Switzerland. It is situated in the east of the canton and shares a border with the French town of Ambilly.

== History ==
In 1869 the municipality was created when Chêne-Thônex split into two independent municipalities Chêne-Bourg and Thônex.

== Geography ==
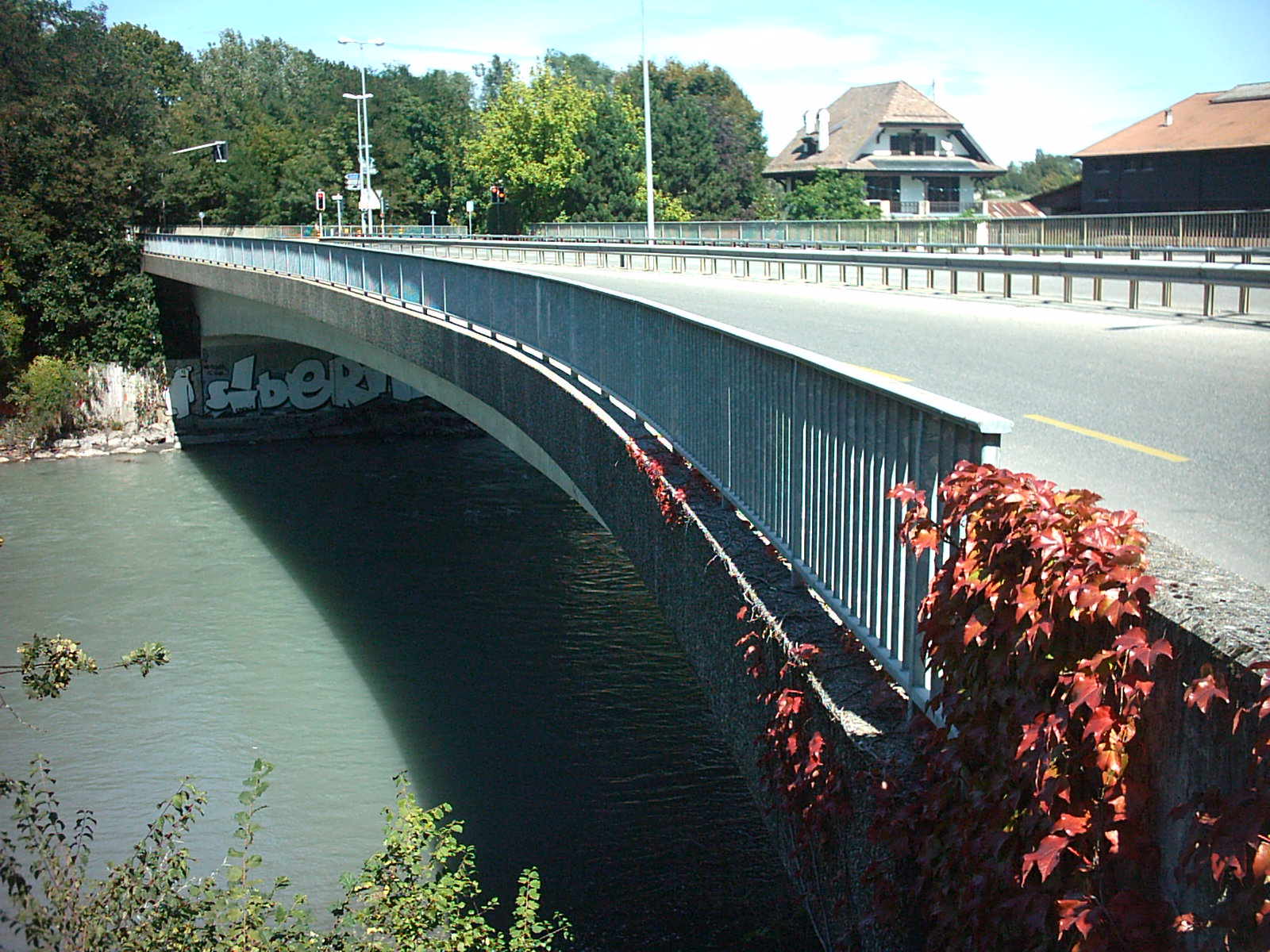
Sierne bridge at Thônex

Thônex has an area, as of 2009, of 3.84 square kilometers (1.48 sq mi). Of this area, 0.87 km^{2} (0.34 sq mi) or 22.7% is used for agricultural purposes, while 0.17 km^{2} (0.066 sq mi) or 4.4% is forested. Of the rest of the land, 2.74 km^{2} (1.06 sq mi) or 71.4% is settled (buildings or roads), 0.05 km^{2} (12 acres) or 1.3% is either rivers or lakes.

Of the built up area, industrial buildings made up 2.3% of the total area while housing and buildings made up 53.1% and transportation infrastructure made up 11.5%. while parks, green belts and sports fields made up 3.6%. Out of the forested land, 2.3% of the total land area is heavily forested and 2.1% is covered with orchards or small clusters of trees. Of the agricultural land, 18.2% is used for growing crops and 3.1% is pastures, while 1.3% is used for orchards or vine crops. All the water in the municipality is flowing water.

The municipality of Thônex consists of the sub-sections or villages of Belle-Idée, Les Sillons, Communaux d'Ambilly, Le Foron, Pierre-à-Bochet, Moillesulaz, Deux-Communes, Adrien-JEANDIN, Sous-Moulin - Les Verchères, Thônex - église, Villette.

== Demographics ==
Largest groups of foreign residents 2013
| Nationality | Amount | % total (population) |
|---|---|---|
| Portugal | 1,305 | 9.5 |
| France | 665 | 4.8 |
| Italy | 498 | 3.6 |
| Spain | 348 | 2.5 |
| UK | 118 | 0.9 |
| Kosovo | 104 | 0.8 |
| Brazil | 101 | 0.7 |
| Russia | 80 | 0.6 |
| Serbia | 68 | 0.5 |
| Germany | 61 | 0.4 |
| USA | 61 | 0.4 |
| Morocco | 55 | 0.4 |
| Congo-Kinshasa | 54 | 0.4 |
| Turkey | 48 | 0.3 |
| Belgium | 46 | 0.3 |
| Netherlands | 44 | 0.3 |
| Tunisia | 36 | 0.3 |
| Poland | 35 | 0.2 |
| Cameroon | 34 | 0.2 |
| Colombia | 34 | 0.2 |

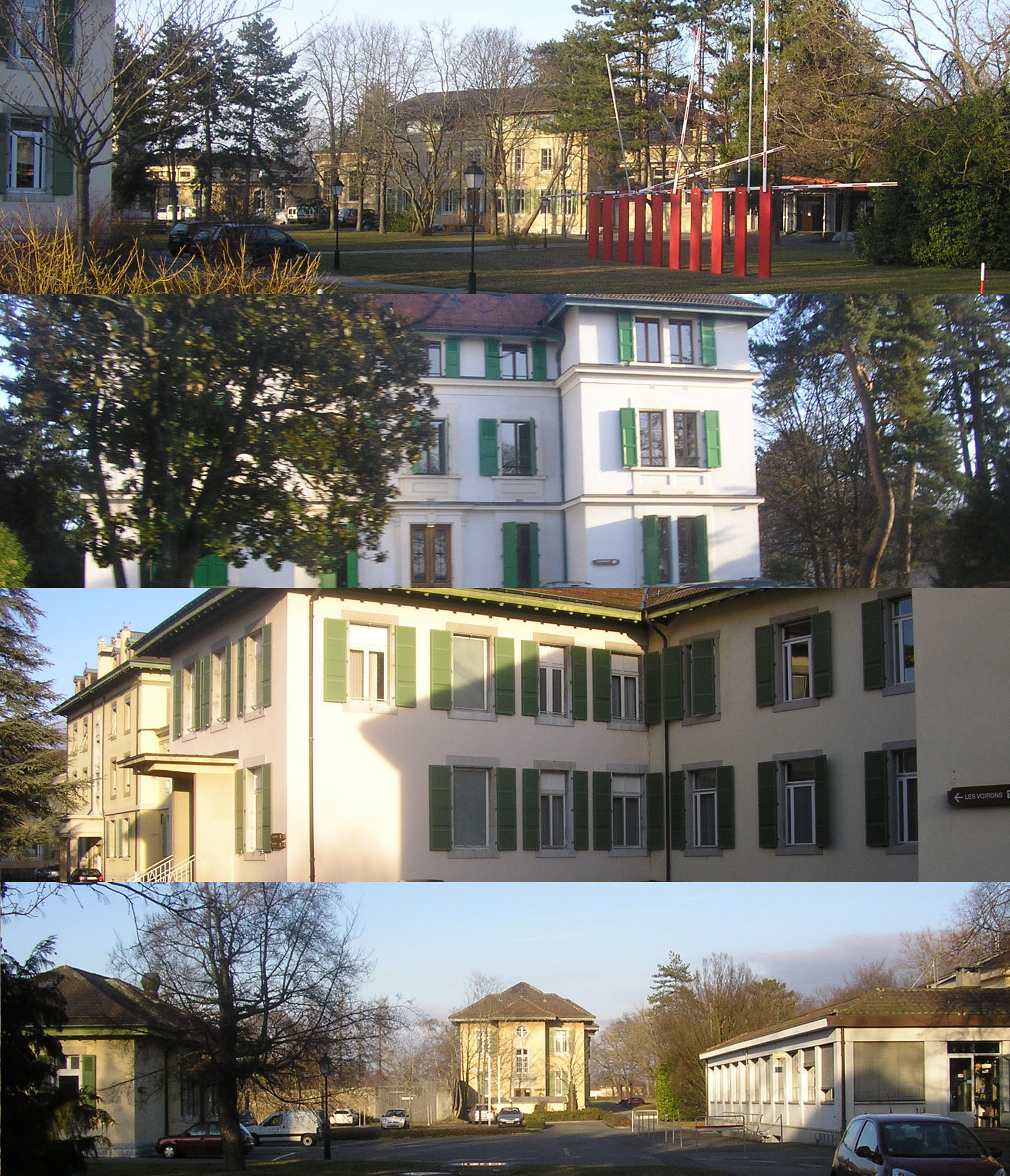
Views of the grounds of the Clinique de Belle-Idée à Genève

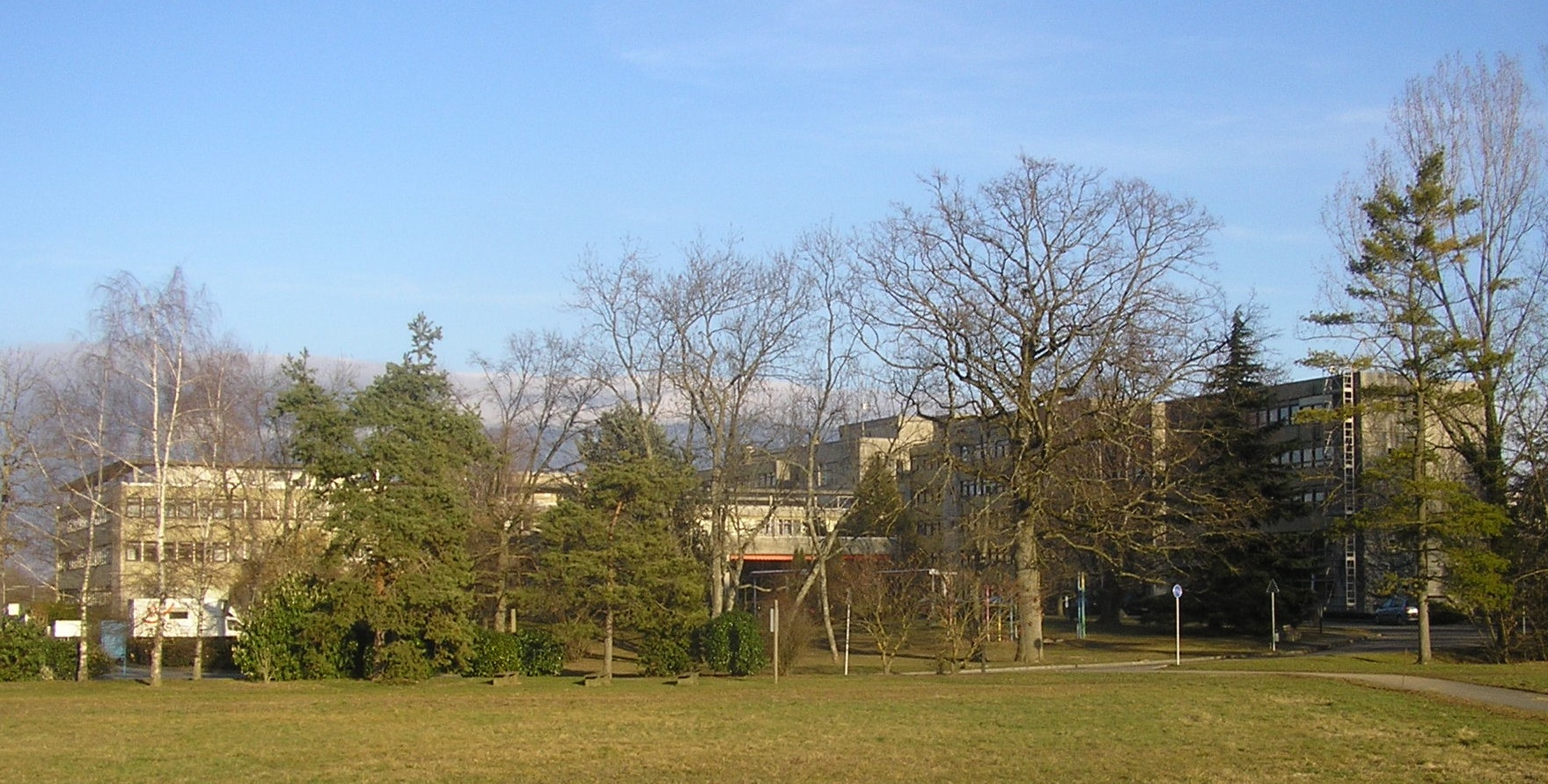
l'Hôpital des Trois-Chênes

Thônex has a population (as of December 2020) of 14,573. As of 2008, 32.6% of the population are resident foreign nationals. Over the last 10 years (1999–2009 ) the population has changed at a rate of 14.6%. It has changed at a rate of 10.8% due to migration and at a rate of 3.9% due to births and deaths.

Most of the population (as of 2000) speaks French (9,626 or 79.3%), with German being second most common (483 or 4.0%) and Portuguese being third (474 or 3.9%). There are 405 people who speak Italian and 7 people who speak Romansh.

As of 2008, the gender distribution of the population was 47.9% male and 52.1% female. The population was made up of 4,170 Swiss men (30.6% of the population) and 2,346 (17.2%) non-Swiss men. There were 4,884 Swiss women (35.9%) and 2,212 (16.3%) non-Swiss women. Of the population in the municipality 1,683 or about 13.9% were born in Thônex and lived there in 2000. There were 3,364 or 27.7% who were born in the same canton, while 1,837 or 15.1% were born somewhere else in Switzerland, and 4,690 or 38.6% were born outside of Switzerland.

In 2008 there were 71 live births to Swiss citizens and 53 births to non-Swiss citizens, and in same time span there were 57 deaths of Swiss citizens and 16 non-Swiss citizen deaths. Ignoring immigration and emigration, the population of Swiss citizens increased by 14 while the foreign population increased by 37. There were 17 Swiss men and 31 Swiss women who emigrated from Switzerland. At the same time, there were 56 non-Swiss men and 83 non-Swiss women who immigrated from another country to Switzerland. The total Swiss population change in 2008 (from all sources, including moves across municipal borders) was an increase of 134 and the non-Swiss population increased by 82 people. This represents a population growth rate of 1.6%.

The age distribution of the population (as of 2000) is children and teenagers (0–19 years old) make up 25.2% of the population, while adults (20–64 years old) make up 59.9% and seniors (over 64 years old) make up 14.9%.

As of 2000, there were 4,849 people who were single and never married in the municipality. There were 5,766 married individuals, 642 widows or widowers and 884 individuals who are divorced.

As of 2000, there were 5,153 private households in the municipality, and an average of 2.3 persons per household. There were 1,868 households that consist of only one person and 294 households with five or more people. Out of a total of 5,246 households that answered this question, 35.6% were households made up of just one person and there were 20 adults who lived with their parents. Of the rest of the households, there are 1,179 married couples without children, 1,620 married couples with children There were 404 single parents with a child or children. There were 62 households that were made up of unrelated people and 93 households that were made up of some sort of institution or another collective housing.

In 2000 there were 1,042 single family homes (or 71.5% of the total) out of a total of 1,457 inhabited buildings. There were 250 multi-family buildings (17.2%), along with 139 multi-purpose buildings that were mostly used for housing (9.5%) and 26 other use buildings (commercial or industrial) that also had some housing (1.8%). Of the single family homes 70 were built before 1919, while 144 were built between 1990 and 2000. The greatest number of single family homes (225) were built between 1971 and 1980. The most multi-family homes (62) were built between 1981 and 1990 and the next most (50) were built between 1961 and 1970. There were 12 multi-family houses built between 1996 and 2000.

In 2000 there were 5,860 apartments in the municipality. The most common apartment size was 3 rooms of which there were 1,361. There were 1,196 single room apartments and 1,204 apartments with five or more rooms. Of these apartments, a total of 5,043 apartments (86.1% of the total) were permanently occupied, while 707 apartments (12.1%) were seasonally occupied and 110 apartments (1.9%) were empty. As of 2009, the construction rate of new housing units was 5.5 new units per 1000 residents. The vacancy rate for the municipality, in 2010, was 0.23%.

The historical population is given in the following chart:

== Twin Town ==
Thônex is twinned with Graveson, France.

== Politics ==
Like all municipalities in the canton of Geneva, the political authorities of Thônex consist of an Administrative Council (Conseil administratif) and a Municipal Council (Conseil municipal), composed of three and twenty-seven citizens respectively, elected for four years. At the last municipal elections which took place in the spring of 2007, foreigners residing in the Canton of Geneva for eight years or more could vote.

In the 2007 federal election the most popular party was the SVP which received 24.02% of the vote. The next three most popular parties were the SP (17.6%), the LPS Party (17.51%) and the Green Party (14.06%). In the federal election, a total of 3,391 votes were cast, and the voter turnout was 49.1%.

In the 2009 Grand Conseil election, there were a total of 7,039 registered voters of which 2,932 (41.7%) voted. The most popular party in the municipality for this election was the Libéral with 21.3% of the ballots. In the canton-wide election they received the highest proportion of votes. The second most popular party was the MCG (with 17.2%), they were third in the canton-wide election, while the third most popular party was the Les Verts (with 12.9%), they were second in the canton-wide election.

For the 2009 Conseil d'Etat election, there were a total of 7,013 registered voters of which 3,376 (48.1%) voted.

In 2011, all the municipalities held local elections, and in Thônex there were 27 spots open on the municipal council. There were a total of 9,409 registered voters of which 3,831 (40.7%) voted. Out of the 3,831 votes, there were 13 blank votes, 12 null or unreadable votes and 223 votes with a name that was not on the list.

== Economy ==
As of 2010, Thônex had an unemployment rate of 6.9%. As of 2008, there were 8 people employed in the primary economic sector and about 4 businesses involved in this sector. 1,282 people were employed in the secondary sector and there were 88 businesses in this sector. 3,633 people were employed in the tertiary sector, with 328 businesses in this sector. There were 5,675 residents of the municipality who were employed in some capacity, of which females made up 45.8% of the workforce.

In 2008 the total number of full-time equivalent jobs was 4,316. The number of jobs in the primary sector was 4, all of which were in agriculture. The number of jobs in the secondary sector was 1,237 of which 831 or (67.2%) were in manufacturing and 396 (32.0%) were in construction. The number of jobs in the tertiary sector was 3,075. In the tertiary sector; 280 or 9.1% were in wholesale or retail sales or the repair of motor vehicles, 42 or 1.4% were in the movement and storage of goods, 110 or 3.6% were in a hotel or restaurant, 57 or 1.9% were in the information industry, 43 or 1.4% were the insurance or financial industry, 248 or 8.1% were technical professionals or scientists, 231 or 7.5% were in education and 1,688 or 54.9% were in health care.

In 2000, there were 4,372 workers who commuted into the municipality and 4,616 workers who commuted away. The municipality is a net exporter of workers, with about 1.1 workers leaving the municipality for every one entering. About 25.3% of the workforce coming into Thônex are coming from outside Switzerland, while 0.1% of the locals commute out of Switzerland for work. Of the working population, 29.8% used public transportation to get to work, and 50% used a private car.

== Religion ==
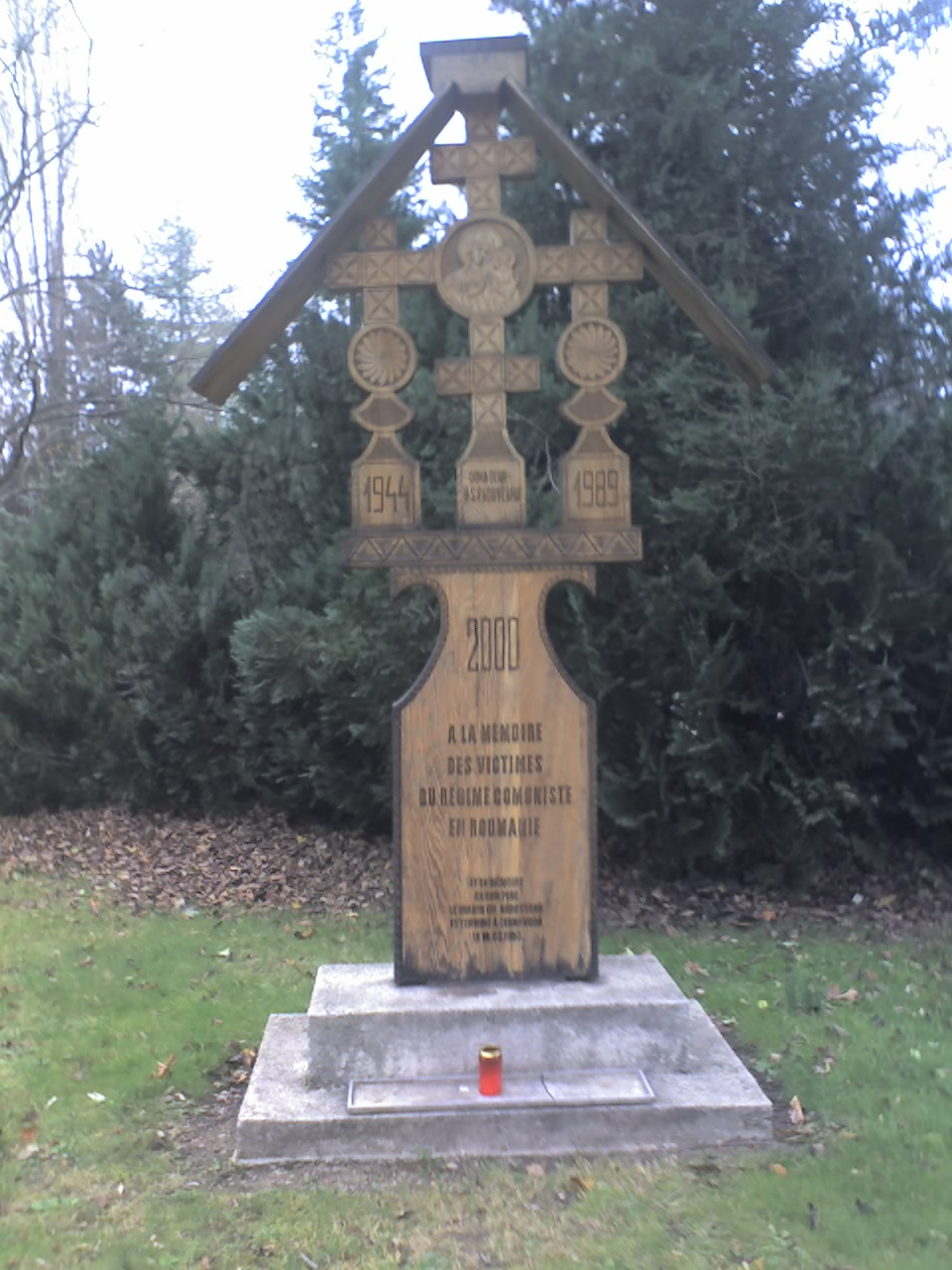
Cross in the courtyard of the Orthodox Church of Thônex, in memory of victims of communist rule in Romania

From the 2000 census, 5,154 or 42.5% were Roman Catholic, while 2,156 or 17.8% belonged to the Swiss Reformed Church. Of the rest of the population, there were 153 members of an Orthodox church (or about 1.26% of the population), there were 33 individuals (or about 0.27% of the population) who belonged to the Christian Catholic Church, and there were 219 individuals (or about 1.80% of the population) who belonged to another Christian church. There were 110 individuals (or about 0.91% of the population) who were Jewish, and 464 (or about 3.82% of the population) who were Islamic. There were 39 individuals who were Buddhist, 2 individuals who were Hindu and 26 individuals who belonged to another church. 2,759 (or about 22.72% of the population) belonged to no church, are agnostic or atheist, and 1,026 individuals (or about 8.45% of the population) did not answer the question.

== Education ==
In Thônex about 3,546 or (29.2%) of the population have completed non-mandatory upper secondary education, and 2,281 or (18.8%) have completed additional higher education (either university or a Fachhochschule). Of the 2,281 who completed tertiary schooling, 40.0% were Swiss men, 33.4% were Swiss women, 15.4% were non-Swiss men and 11.2% were non-Swiss women.

During the 2009–2010 school year there were a total of 2,816 students in the Thônex school system. The education system in the Canton of Geneva allows young children to attend two years of non-obligatory Kindergarten. During that school year, there were 131 children who were in a pre-kindergarten class. The canton's school system provides two years of non-mandatory kindergarten and requires students to attend six years of primary school, with some of the children attending smaller, specialized classes. In Thônex there were 487 students in kindergarten or primary school and 50 students were in the special, smaller classes. The secondary school program consists of three lower, obligatory years of schooling, followed by three to five years of optional, advanced schools. There were 487 lower secondary students who attended school in Thônex. There were 708 upper secondary students from the municipality along with 132 students who were in a professional, non-university track program. An additional 293 students attended a private school.

As of 2000, there were 431 students in Thônex who came from another municipality, while 1,022 residents attended schools outside the municipality.

== Sport ==
CS Chênois is the municipality's football club.

== Notable people ==
- Gaston Jacquet (1883 – 1970 in Thônex) a French actor
- María Corda (1898 – 1976 in Thônex) a Hungarian actress and a star of the silent film era in Germany and Austria
- Marie José of Belgium (1906 – 2001 in Thônex) the last Queen of Italy
- Nadège Lacroix (born 1986 in Thônex) a Swiss actress and television personality
