= Beat Studer =

Swiss footballer (born 1968)

Personal information
- Date of birth: 25 November 1968 (age 57)
- Position: Defender

Senior career*
Years	Team	Apps	(Gls)
1987–1994	FC Zürich		
1994–2000	FC Aarau		
2000–2001	SC YF Juventus		
- * Club domestic league appearances and goals

Beat Studer (born 25 November 1968) is a retired Swiss football defender.
