= Andreas Hilfiker =

Swiss footballer (born 1969)

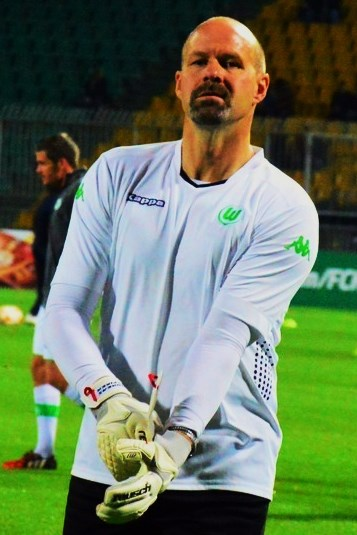

Personal information
- Full name: Andreas Hilfiker
- Date of birth: 11 February 1969 (age 57)
- Place of birth: Aarau, Switzerland
- Height: 1.86 m (6 ft 1 in)
- Position: Goalkeeper

Youth career
- 1981–1986: FC Kölliken
- 1986–1987: FC Aarau

Senior career*
| Years | Team | Apps | (Gls) |
| 1987–1997 | FC Aarau | 198 | (0) |
| 1997–1999 | 1. FC Nürnberg | 35 | (0) |
| 1999–2000 | Tennis Borussia Berlin | 32 | (0) |
| 2000–2001 | SSV Ulm 1846 | 31 | (0) |
| 2001–2002 | FC Vaduz | 17 | (0) |
| 2002–2004 | FC Luzern | 56 | (0) |
| 2004–2005 | Zug 94 | 7 | (0) |
| Total | | 376 | (0) |

International career
| 1997–1999 | Switzerland | 8 | (0) |

Managerial career
- 2024–: Grasshoppers academy (goalkeeping)
- * Club domestic league appearances and goals

Andreas Hilfiker (born 11 February 1969) is a Swiss former international footballer who played as a goalkeeper. He is currently the head goalkeeping coach for Grasshopper Club Zürich's academy.

== Playing career ==
Born in Aarau, Hilfiker joined FC Aarau in 1986, playing nearly 200 league games for the first team in over 10 years, winning the Swiss national title in 1992–93, before moving to Germany, where he signed for 1. FC Nürnberg. At this time, in the late 1990s, he made eight appearances for the Switzerland national football team. Hilfiker later played for Tennis Borussia Berlin and SSV Ulm 1846 before signing for FC Vaduz in Liechtenstein. He also played for FC Luzern and Zug 94 in his native Switzerland.

== Coaching career ==
At the end of his playing career, Hilfiker became the goalkeeping coach of FC Thun. After a period in the same role at his home-team club FC Aarau, he became the goalkeeping coach of VfL Wolfsburg in 2008. In 2018, he became responsible for coordinating the goalkeeping department at Wolfsburg. After almost 12 years at the club, Wolfsburg confirmed on 23 December 2019 that they had parted ways with Hilfiker by mutual agreement.

On 9 August 2024, he was announced as Grasshopper Club Zürich's academy's head goalkeeping coach.
