= Jeff Saibene =

Luxembourgish footballer and coach (born 1968)

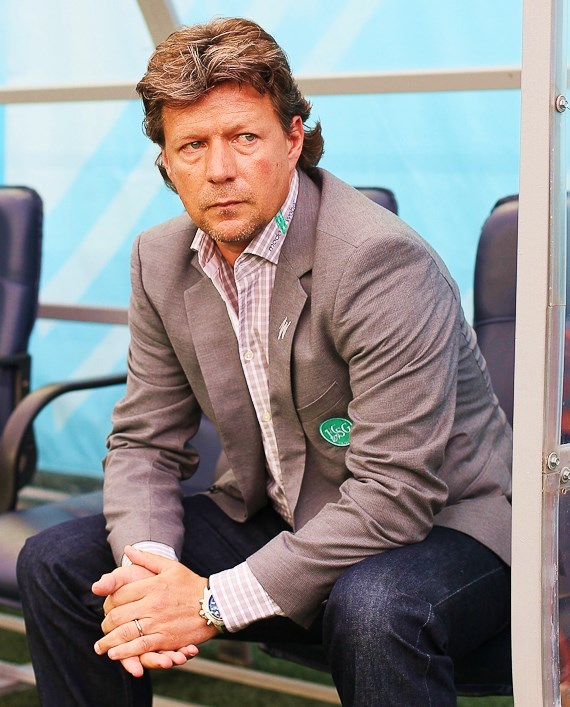
- Saibene in 2013

Personal information
- Date of birth: 13 September 1968 (age 58)
- Place of birth: Keispelt, Luxembourg
- Height: 1.70 m (5 ft 7 in)
- Position: Midfielder

Senior career*
Years	Team	Apps	(Gls)
1985–1986	Union Luxembourg		
1986–1989	Standard Liège	7	(0)
1989–1993	Aarau	49	(3)
1993–1994	Old Boys Basel	38	(9)
1994–1995	Monthey		
1995–1998	Aarau	72	(0)
1998–1999	Locarno		
1999–2002	Swift Hesperange		

International career
1986–2001	Luxembourg	63	(0)

Managerial career
- 2007: Thun
- 2009: Aarau
- 2010–2011: Luxembourg U-21
- 2011–2015: St. Gallen
- 2015–2017: Thun
- 2017–2018: Arminia Bielefeld
- 2019–2020: FC Ingolstadt
- 2020–2021: 1. FC Kaiserslautern
- 2021–2022: Racing-Union
- 2022–2023: Neuchâtel Xamax
- * Club domestic league appearances and goals

Jeff Saibene (born 13 September 1968) is a Luxembourgish former professional footballer and manager who most recently managed Swiss Challenge League club Neuchâtel Xamax.

== Personal life ==
Saibene is a citizen of both Luxembourg and Switzerland and married with a Swiss wife. He is a fan of Hamburger SV.

== Club career ==
He played most of his club football abroad, predominantly in Switzerland, but also in Belgium for Standard Liège. He began and ended his playing career in his native Luxembourg.

== International career ==
As a defensive midfielder or defender, Saibene played for Luxembourg's national team 63 times between 1986 and 2001. He played in 27 FIFA World Cup qualification matches.

He played his final international game in October 2001, a World Cup qualification loss at Yugoslavia.

== Coaching career ==
Saibene was the manager of FC Aarau, in Switzerland and assistant to Allan Simonsen at the national team. He was formerly the assistant manager to Ryszard Komornicki at Aarau but was promoted in June 2009 when Komornicki left the club. He then managed Luxembourg U-21. He left his position in March 2011 to coach FC St. Gallen.

On 19 March 2017, he was appointed as the new head coach of Arminia Bielefeld. He was sacked on 10 December 2018.

He was appointed as the new head coach of FC Ingolstadt for the 2019–20 season. He was sacked on 9 March 2020.

On 2 October 2020, he was named head coach of 1. FC Kaiserslautern. He was sacked on 30 January 2021.

In June 2021, he was named new head coach of Racing FC Union Luxembourg.

On 29 August 2022, he returned to Switzerland to take over coaching duties of struggling Swiss Challenge League side Neuchâtel Xamax. He was unable to turn around Xamax's fortune, managing only three wins in 25 games he managed. Following a 2–5 defeat to FC Aarau on 23 April 2023, he handed in his resignation.

=== Managerial ===
As of 23 April 2023

Managerial record by team and tenure
Team	Nat.	From	To	Record				
Team	Nat.	From	To	G	W	D	L	Win %
Thun	(Switzerland)	7 March 2007	5 June 2007	8	3	1	4	37.50
Aarau	(Switzerland)	1 July 2009	12 October 2009	13	2	2	9	15.38
Luxembourg U-21	(Luxembourg)	20 August 2010	7 March 2011	2	1	0	1	50.00
St. Gallen	(Switzerland)	7 March 2011	1 September 2015	182	80	42	60	43.96
Thun	(Switzerland)	6 October 2015	19 March 2017	53	15	18	20	28.30
Arminia Bielefeld	(Germany)	20 March 2017	10 December 2018	62	19	23	20	30.65
Ingolstadt 04	(Germany)	1 July 2019	9 March 2020	31	13	9	9	41.94
1. FC Kaiserslautern	(Germany)	2 October 2020	30 January 2021	21	4	12	5	19.05
Racing-Union	(Luxembourg)	1 July 2021	30 June 2022	36	19	4	13	52.78
Neuchâtel Xamax	(Switzerland)	29 August 2022	23 April 2023	25	3	10	12	12.00
Total				433	159	121	153	36.72

== Honours ==
=== As player ===
Union Luxembourg

- Luxembourg Cup: 1985–86

FC Aarau

- Swiss National League A: 1992–93

=== As manager ===
St. Gallen

- Swiss Challenge League: 2011–12

Racing Union

- Luxembourg Cup: 2021–22
