= Martin Trümpler =

Swiss footballer and manager (born 1948)

Personal information
- Date of birth: 13 August 1948 (age 78)
- Position: Defender

Senior career*
Years	Team	Apps	(Gls)
1970–1978	BSC Young Boys		
1978–1984	SC Burgdorf		

Managerial career
- 1986–1990: FC Thun
- 1990–1994: BSC Young Boys
- 1994–1995: FC Lausanne-Sport
- 1995–1998: FC Aarau
- Switzerland u-20
- * Club domestic league appearances and goals

Martin Trümpler (born 13 August 1948) is a retired Swiss football defender and later manager.
