= Serge Muhmenthaler =

Swiss football referee (born 1953)

Personal information
- Date of birth: 20 May 1953 (age 73)
- Place of birth: Grenchen, Switzerland
- Position: Forward

Youth career
- FC Grenchen

Senior career*
Years	Team	Apps	(Gls)
–1972	FC Grenchen		
1972–1975	Young Boys		
1975–1978	FC Basel		
- * Club domestic league appearances and goals

Serge Muhmenthaler
- Born: 20 May 1953 (age 73); Grenchen, Switzerland

Domestic
Years	League	Role
1988–1999	Swiss Nationalliga A	Referee

International
Years	League	Role
1989–1998	FIFA-listed	Referee

Serge Muhmenthaler (born 20 May 1953) is a Swiss former professional football player and referee. He played as a forward during the 1970s and 1980s. As referee he is known for having refereed a Swiss Cup Final, a UEFA Cup Final and one match in the UEFA Euro 1996.

== Career as player ==
Muhmenthaler was brought up in Grenchen and started his football with the youth teams of the local football club FC Grenchen. He also played in their first team in the Nationalliga B and they won promotion to the Nationalliga A in the 1970–71 season. The team also won the Uhrencup that year and Muhmenthaler scored the first goal in the final, as they beat FC Basel 3–1. In the summer of 1972, Muhmenthaler transferred to BSC Young Boys and he played there as forward for three years. With the Young Boys, Muhmenthaler won the Uhrencup 1973 and he scored a goal in the semifinal against his previous club Grenchen.

In 1975, Muhmenthaler transferred with a two-year contract to FC Basel. He made his team debut in the 5–1 home win against Grasshopper Club Zürich and Muhmenthaler scored three of the goals. He was part of the title winning team in the 1976–77 football season. During a cup match in February 1976, he suffered a meniscus rupture. Nevertheless, Basel extended his contract despite the fact that Muhmenthaler had to undergo three operations within the following two years. Muhmenthaler reached his third Uhrencup Final with his third club in 1977 but was unable to repeat the success, the final ended in a 6–1 defeat against Neuchâtel Xamax. Reaching the final again in the next year, Basel won the 1978 Uhrencup 2–1 against the same finalists.

Muhmenthaler was forced to terminate his playing career early due to his injury.

== Career as referee ==
After his time as an active player Muhmenthaler became referee in the Swiss Football League. His career in brief: 1980–81: 3. Liga. 1981 to 1984: 2. Liga. From the season 1984–85: referee in the Swiss Football Association. From 1989: FIFA-Referee.

From 1980 until the end of his career in December 1997 he conducted about 250 Swiss and some 75 international games. Amongst these he describes as one of his personal highlights the 1998 FIFA World Cup qualification match on 11 November 1997 between Italy and Russia (1–0) in front of 80 000 spectators at the Stadio San Paolo, Naples. As part of the then practiced German-Swiss referee exchange 1988–1990, Muhmenthaler led four games in the Bundesliga.

== Honours ==
Grenchen

- Promotion to Nationalliga A: 1970–71
- Uhrencup: 1971

BSC Young Boys

- Uhrencup: 1973

Basel

- Coppa delle Alpi Finalist: 1975
- Swiss National Championship: 1977
- Uhrencup: 1978

as Referee

- Swiss Referee of the Year: 1989, 1998
- 15 May 1989 Swiss Cup Final: Grasshopper Club Zürich – FC Aarau (2–1)
- 1 May 1996 UEFA Cup Final: Bayern Munich – FC Girondins de Bordeaux (2–0)
- 11 June 1996 UEFA Euro 1996 Group D: Turkey – Croatia (0–1)
- 5 February 1997 1996 UEFA Super Cup Second leg: Juventus Turin – Paris Saint-Germain (3–1)
