= Dariusz Skrzypczak =

Polish footballer and manager

Personal information
- Date of birth: 13 November 1967 (age 58)
- Place of birth: Rawicz, Poland
- Height: 1.81 m (5 ft 11 in)
- Position: Midfielder

Team information
- Current team: FC Besa Biel/Bienne (manager)

Senior career*
Years	Team	Apps	(Gls)
1984–1994	Lech Poznań	245	(36)
1994–2003	FC Aarau	227	(14)
2003–2004	FC Hochdorf		
2004–2007	FC Langenthal		

International career
- Poland U18
1991–1992	Poland	7	(0)

Managerial career
- 2010–2011: FC Emmenbrücke
- 2011–2012: FC Entfelden
- 2016: FC Wangen bei Olten
- 2016–2017: FC Black Stars Basel
- 2017–2019: FC Solothurn
- 2020: Stal Mielec
- 2023–2025: FC Rotkreuz
- 2025–: FC Besa Biel/Bienne
Medal record
Men's football
Representing Poland
UEFA European Under-18 Championship
Third place	1984 Soviet Union
- * Club domestic league appearances and goals

Dariusz Skrzypczak (born 13 November 1967) is a Polish professional football manager and former player. He is currently in charge of Swiss club FC Besa Biel/Bienne.

== Honours ==
Lech Poznań

- Ekstraklasa: 1989–90, 1991–92, 1992–93
- Polish Cup: 1987–88
- Polish Super Cup: 1990, 1992

Poland U18

- UEFA European Under-18 Championship third place: 1984
