= Remo Senn =

Swiss footballer (born 1976)

Personal information
- Date of birth: 26 September 1976 (age 50)
- Position: Midfielder

Senior career*
Years	Team	Apps	(Gls)
1995–1997	FC Aarau	37	(2)
1997	→ FC Locarno	1	(1)
1997-1998	FC Locarno	1	(0)
1999–2001	FC Aarau	24	(1)
2001–2003	FC Baden	7	(1)
2013-2015	FC Gränichen	9	(1)

International career
1997	U21 Swiss National Football Team	1	
- * Club domestic league appearances and goals

Remo Senn (born 26 September 1976) is a retired Swiss football midfielder.
