= David Bader (footballer) =

Swiss footballer (born 1969)

Personal information
- Date of birth: 22 December 1969 (age 56)
- Position: Defender

Senior career*
Years	Team	Apps	(Gls)
1989–2001	FC Aarau		
2001–2003	FC Wangen bei Olten		
- * Club domestic league appearances and goals

David Bader (born 22 December 1969) is a retired Swiss football defender.

While at FC Aarau he was part of the side that won the Swiss national title in 1992–93.
