= Stadion Brügglifeld =

Stadium in Aarau, Switzerland

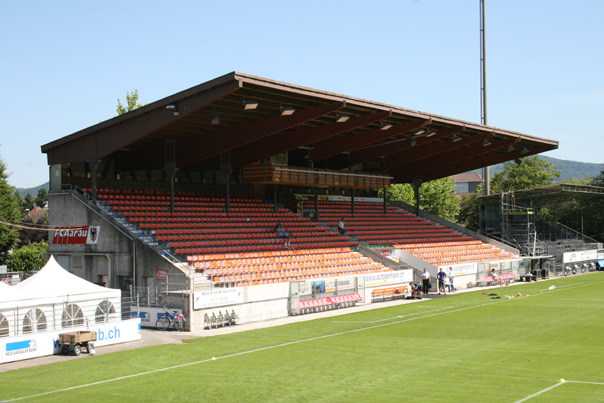
- Interactive map of Stadion Brügglifeld
- Location: Suhr, Aargau, Switzerland
- Coordinates: 47°23′00″N 8°03′36″E
- Owner: Platzgenossenschaft Brügglifeld
- Capacity: 9,249
- Surface: Grass

Construction
- Opened: 12 October 1924
- Expanded: 1982

Tenants
- FC Aarau

Stadion Brügglifeld is a multi-purpose stadium in Aarau, Switzerland. It is primarily used for football matches and is the home stadium of FC Aarau. The current capacity is 9,249 seats, which include 1499 covered seats. 1,187 covered seats are in the main stand and 312 additional seats are located in the smaller grandstand. The remainder of the seating capacity is an uncovered terracing area which has space for 7,750. Fans of away teams are seated behind one goal, to the right of the players' entrances. This section has space for 1,500 fans.

The stadium opened on 12 October 1924 with a friendly match against local side FC Zürich. A new main stand was added in 1982 and a smaller grandstand was completed in the 1990s, along with a complete renovation of the standing areas. The stadium is in the Suhr municipality.

In 2008, proposals were put forward for a new urban development to include a new home for FC Aarau. The proposal included that Mittelland Arena, in the heart of Central Park in Aarau, could be used to provide a capacity of over 12,500 seats. On 25 September 2005, the proposal for the new development, including the football stadium and a shopping centre, were rejected by the people of Aarau in a referendum. FC Aarau Ltd and the city council are currently working on a new solution for the club, as the current stadium is considered to be not good enough for top-flight football. The Swiss Football Association are unhappy at its use in the top flight.
