= Renato Brugnoli =

Swiss footballer (born 1969)

Personal information
- Date of birth: 1 May 1969 (age 57)
- Position: Midfielder

Senior career*
Years	Team	Apps	(Gls)
1991–1993	FC Schaffhausen		
1993–1994	SC Kriens		
1994–1997	FC Aarau		
1997–1998	FC Zürich		
1998–2002	FC Winterthur		
2002–2003	FC Vaduz		
2003–2004	FC Winterthur		
- * Club domestic league appearances and goals

Renato Brugnoli (born 1 May 1969) is a retired Swiss football midfielder.
