= 1996–97 FC Basel season =

FC Basel
1996–97 season
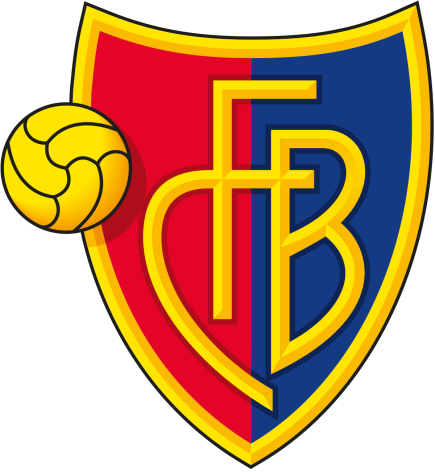
- Club president: René C. Jäggi
- Head coach: Karl Engel (until March 1997); Heinz Hermann (interim); Salvatore Andracchio (ad-interim from April)
- Ground: St. Jakob Stadium, Basel
- NLA Qualifying Phase: 8th of 12
- Championship Group: 8th of 8
- 1996–97 Swiss Cup: Round of 16
- 1996 UEFA Intertoto Cup: 2nd in Group 7
- Top goalscorer: League: Gaetano Giallanza (17); All: Gaetano Giallanza (19)
- Highest home attendance: 22,000 on 2 March 1997 vs Zürich
- Lowest home attendance: 6,000 on 15 May 1997 vs Xamax and on 31 May 1997 vs Aarau
- Average home league attendance: 10,800

The 1996–97 Fussball Club Basel 1893 season was their 104th season since the club's foundation. Peter Epting retired from the chairmanship and René C. Jäggi became the club's new chairman following the AGM which was held in November. FC Basel played their home games in the St. Jakob Stadium. Following their promotion in the 1993–94 season this was their third consecutive season in the highest tier of Swiss football.

== Overview ==
=== Pre-season ===
Club president Jäggi appointed Karl Engel as new head-coach before the start of the season. However, after a bad qualifying phase, as the team ended only two points above the relegation zone, and then continued in a very bad start to the championship group, Engel was fired by the club's sporting director Heinz Hermann in March 1997. Hermann replaced Engel on the side line himself, but he remained ad-interim coach for just a few weeks, in which he suffered three consequetive defeats. Hermann then installed Salvatore Andracchio as new coach ad-interim until the end of the season. The clubs priority aim for the team was to remain in the top flight of Swiss football and this had been achieved by reaching the championship group before the winter break. The teams next aim to reach at least a top five place was failed by a long way.

A number of players had left the club during the off-season, Ike Shorunmu transferred to Zürich, Mario Cantaluppi moved to Servette and Gabriel Okolosi to Young Boys. Both Davide Orlando and Alexandre Rey moved back to Sion. Further players who left the club were Marco Walker, who moved to German team 1860 Munich, Lars Olsen returned to Denmark and joined Brøndby and Andre Meier moved on to FC Schaffhausen. To balance this, the club made some new signings as the season started. Adrian Knup returned to the club, signed in after a short spell by Galatasaray. Other players who joined from foreign clubs were, Adrian Falub who came from Universitatea Cluj and Mariano Armentano from Racing Club. A number of players also transferred from the domestic league, Gaetano Giallanza and Jean-Pierre La Placa both signed in from Sion, Mario Frick came from St. Gallen and Yann Poulard signed in from SR Delémont.

=== Domestic league ===
The clubs priority aim for the team was to remain in the top flight of Swiss football, but the season did not start too well. It took until the twelfth round until the team recorded their third victory and one of these three was a forfeit victory because YB had used an unqualified player, Erol Bekirovski, in the match in the fourth round. As the first half of the season came to an end, the team had gathered five victories, ten draws and had suffered seven defeats in which the team scored 32 goals and conceded 33. Gaetano Giallanza was the team's top scorer with nine goals and Mario Frick was second best with six goals. Basel were in eighth position in the league table, thus, they qualified for the Championship round.

During the winter break Markus Schupp signed in on loan from Hamburger SV, Franco Foda signed in from VfB Stuttgart and Fabrice Henry signed in from CD Toledo. Also during the winter break Admir Smajić transferred out to Young Boys. The teams next aim was to reach at least a top five place in the Championship round. However, the team suffered six defeats in a row. During this period head-coach Karl Engel was fired and was replaced by Heinz Hermann. The football did not improve and after just a few weeks Hermann was replaced by Salvatore Andracchio. Basel ended the championship round with nine defeats in twelve games. They had won only three games and had drawn two, so they ended the group in the last position in the final league table. The team scored just 16 goals and had conceded 28. Gaetano Giallanza was the team's top scorer, he had netted eight times in this stage.

=== Swiss Cup ===
Basel entered the Swiss Cup in the third principal round. The opponent here was lower tier FC Münsingen. Basel won the match after extra time. In the fourth round hosted the game against Young Boys and won 2–1. Oumar Kondé and Jean-Pierre La Placa each scored a goal and turned the game, after the team had been a goal behind early in the match. In the round of 16 FCB hosted Servette but tFCB were knocked out, losing 1–4. The cup final was played between Sion and Luzern and ended with a three all draw after extra time. Sion won the penalty shoot out and won the trophy. Because Sion won the double, as Swiss champions, they were qualified for the 1997–98 Champions League. Therefore, as finalists Luzern qualified to the 1997–98 Cup Winners' Cup.

=== UEFA Intertoto Cup ===
In the 1996 UEFA Intertoto Cup Basel played in group 7 together with Rotor Volgograd, Antalyaspor, Shakhtar Donetsk and Ataka-Aura Minsk. Basel won in Turkey against Antalyaspor and at home in the St. Jakob Stadium against Minsk. They drew at home with Shakhtar, but lost the in Russia against Volgograd who ended at the top of the group and continued to the next round. Basel ended the competition as second-placed team in the group league table.

== Players ==
The following is the list of the Basel first team squad. It also includes players that were in the squad the day the season started on 10 July 1996 but subsequently left the club after that date.

Note: Flags indicate national team as defined under FIFA eligibility rules; some limited exceptions apply. Players may hold more than one non-FIFA nationality.

No.	Pos.	Nation	Player
1	GK	SUI	Stefan Huber
2	DF	SUI	Massimo Ceccaroni
3	DF	SUI	Yann Poulard (from SR Delémont)
4	DF	BIH	Samir Tabakovic
5	DF	SUI	Daniel Salvi (from Wil)
6	MF	GHA	Alex Nyarko
7	MF	SUI	Bruno Sutter
8	MF	LIE	Mario Frick (from St. Gallen)
8	MF	SUI	Mario Cantaluppi (to Servette)
9	FW	SUI	Dario Zuffi
10	MF	BIH	Admir Smajić (to Young Boys)
11	FW	SUI	Gaetano Giallanza (from Sion)
12	GK	SUI	Thomas Grüter
13	FW	SUI	Adrian Knup (from Galatasaray)
14	MF	SUI	Theodoros Disseris
15	MF	FRA	Fabrice Henry (from CD Toledo)

No.	Pos.	Nation	Player
16	DF	SUI	Ivan Reimann (from youth team)
16	MF	SUI	Dominic Moser (on loan to Young Boys)
17	MF	SUI	Jean-Pierre La Placa (from Sion)
17	MF	SUI	Hakan Yakin
18	DF	SUI	Cyrill Schmidiger (from SV Muttenz)
19	DF	SUI	Davide Orlando
20	DF	SUI	Oumar Kondé
21	MF	ARG	Mariano Armentano (from Racing Club)
22	GK	SUI	Oliver Stöckli
23	MF	ROU	Adrian Falub (from Universitatea Cluj)
24	DF	SUI	Yannick Hasler
24	MF	GER	Markus Schupp (from Hamburger SV)
24	MF	ITA	Marcello Gamberini (from Modigliana Calcio)
25	MF	GER	Franco Foda (from VfB Stuttgart)
—	DF	SUI	Remo Buess (from youth team)
—	DF	SUI	Marco Tschopp

Players who left the squad

The following is the list of the FCB first team players that left the squad during the previous season or in the off-season, before the new domestic season began.

Note: Flags indicate national team as defined under FIFA eligibility rules; some limited exceptions apply. Players may hold more than one non-FIFA nationality.

No.	Pos.	Nation	Player
—	GK	NIG	Ike Shorunmu (to Zürich)
—	DF	FRA	Yassine Douimi (to FC Riehen)
—	DF	DEN	Lars Olsen (to Brøndby)
—	DF	TUR	Dilaver Satılmış (to Trabzonspor)
—	DF	BRA	Vilmar (to FC Baden)

No.	Pos.	Nation	Player
—	DF	SUI	Marco Walker (to 1860 Munich)
—	MF	SUI	Andre Meier (to FC Schaffhausen)
—	MF	SUI	Daniele Moro (end of loan from Xamax)
—	MF	NIG	Gabriel Okolosi (to Young Boys)
—	FW	SUI	Davide Orlando (to Sion)
—	FW	SUI	Alexandre Rey (to Sion)

== Results ==
Legend

Win Draw Loss Postponed

=== Friendly matches ===
==== Pre- and mid-season ====
20 June 1996 Pre-season; Exhibition game	Basel (Switzerland)	2–4	(Switzerland) Grasshopper Club	Löhrenacker, Aesch
19:30	Smajić (yellow card) 80'; H. Yakin 89' (1:4); Nyarko 90' (2:4)	FCB summary	41' (0:1) Magnin; 52' (0:2) Magnin; 70' (0:3) Abdullahi; 79' (0:4) Jansen	Attendance: 1,200; Referee: (Switzerland) Andreas Schluchter (Schönenbuch)
Note: FCB were without Huber (his wife was expecting a child), Cantaluppi (injured), and Orlando (military service). GC were without Vogel, Türkyilmaz, and Comisetti (all on international duty), as well as Subiat, Thüler, Lombardo, and Gren (all injured or rested). 67th-minute, goal from GC player Abdullahi was disallowed (an extra ball from the stands got in the way). 90th-minute, goal from FCB player Giallanza was disallowed for offside.

25 June 1996 Pre-season	FC Deitingen (Switzerland)	0–8	(Switzerland) Basel	Grabmatt, Deitingen
19:00		FCB summary	1' (0:1) Armentano; 7' (0:2) La Placa; 13' (0:3) La Placa; 19' (0:4) Armentano; 22' (0:5) Smajić; 70' (0:6) Smajić; 82' (0:7) Armentano; 88' (0:8) Armentano	Attendance: 500; Referee: (Switzerland) Dieter Schoch (Attiswil)
Note: FCB were without Tabakovic, Sutter, Zuffi, and Ceccaroni (all injured), as well as Salvi and Poulard (both ill) and Huber (attended the birth of his son Jan). 19th minute: Frick substituted with a muscle strain. No cautions.

5 July 1996 Pre-season	Thun (Switzerland)	0–4	(Switzerland) Basel	Stadion Lachen, Thun
19:00		FCB summary	26' (0:1) H. Yakin; 78' (o.g. 0:2) (Speich); 82' (0:3) Frick; 88' (0:4) Giallanza	Attendance: 300; Referee: (Switzerland) Markus Nobs (Wohlen bei Bern)
Note: Thun played without Kurtulus (injured) and Baumann (absent), Basel without Sutter (recovering) and Nyarko (ill). No cautions in a fair game.

18 August 1996 Mid-season	Basel (Switzerland)	1–4	Bahrain	Stadion Rankhof, Basel
	Armentano (yellow card) 32'; Ivan Reimann (red card) 37'; Armentano 66' (1:2)	FCB summary	(yellow card) 15' Al-Haiki; 45' (0:1) Jassem; 62' (0:2) Issa; (yellow card) 75' Mohamed; 87' (1:3) Al Dossari; 90' (1:4) Jassem	Attendance: 2,500; Referee: (Switzerland) Andreas Schluchter (Schönenbuch)
Note: Opening of the Stadion Rankhof sports facilities. FCB, with the exception of Giallanza, without the players who had played against GC in the league on the day before.

3 October 1996 Mid-season	SV Muttenz (Switzerland)	1–5	(Switzerland) Basel	Margelacker, Muttenz
19:00	Morpain 64' (1:2)	FCB summary	24' (0:1) Giallanza; 62' (0:2) Armentano; 72' (1:3) Armentano; 77' (1:4) Armentano; 83' (1:5) Armentano	Attendance: 1,500; Referee: (Switzerland) Andreas Schluchter (Schönenbuch)
Note: Muttenz without Humbel and Füri (both absent), FCB without Smajic (Bosnia national team), Sutter, Yakin (both U21) and Orlando and Salvi (both injured). Anniversary game 75 years of SV Muttenz.

8 November 1996 Mid-season	Basel (Switzerland)	2–1	(Italy) Italian 11	Gitterli, Liestal
19:00	Falub (yellow card) 22'; Giallanza 23' (1:0); Zuffi 85' (2:1)	FCB summary	45' (1:1) Pupita; (yellow card) 57' Pupita; (yellow card) 82' Magrini	Attendance: 700; Referee: (Switzerland) Andreas Schluchter (Schönenbuch)
Note: FCB without Poulard (injured), Sutter, Yakin (both U21), and Tabakovic (played in the youth team that day).

==== Winter break ====
30 January 1997 Winter break Exhibition game	Servette (Switzerland)	3–0	(Switzerland) Basel	Stade des Trois-Chêne, Thônex
15:00	Rey 64' (1:0); Rey 66' (2:0); Pizzinat 69' (3:0); Nava (yellow card) 81'	FCB summary		Attendance: 100; Referee: (Switzerland) Dieter Schoch (Attiswil)
Note: FCB were without Zuffi (ill), Disseris (school), Tabakovic, Frick, and Poulard (all injured). Servette were without Marguerat, Barberis, Fatusi, and Varela (injured).

8 February 1997 Winter break	SC Freiburg (Germany)	2–2	(Switzerland) Basel	Dreisamstadion, Freiburg
15:30	Jurčević 19' (1:1); Wagner 84' (2:1)	FCB summary	13' (0:1) Nyarko; 90+1' (2:2) H. Yakin	Attendance: 9,000; Referee: (Germany) Fritz Baudendistel
Note: FCB were without Frick, Poulard and Orlando (all injured).

9 February 1997 Winter break	Locarno (Switzerland)	0–0	(Switzerland) Basel	Stadio del Lido, Locarno
14:00	Senn (yellow card) 35'	FCB summary	(yellow card) 17' La Placa; (yellow card) 32' H. Yakin	Attendance: 400; Referee: (Switzerland) Carlo Bertolini (Vira-Gambarogno)
Note: FCB without Poulard, Orlando and Frick (all injured).

13 February 1997 Winter break	Pianorese Calcio (Italy)	0–5	(Switzerland) Basel	Stadio Comunale, Pianoro, Bologna
		FCB summary	35' (0:1) Knup; 38' (0:2) H. Yakin; 58' (0:3) Knup; 75' (0:4) Knup; 87' (0:5) Giallanza	Attendance: 25; Referee: (Italy) Salvatore Nuccio
Note: FCB without Smajic, Orlando, Poulard and Frick (all injured).

15 February 1997 Winter break	Lugano (Switzerland)	1–0	(Switzerland) Basel	Cornaredo, Lugano
14:00	Kallon 73' (1:0)	FCB summary		Attendance: 500; Referee: (Switzerland) Roberto Ferrari
Note: Lugano without Andreoli (injured) and Karic (ill), Basel without Frick, Poulard, Orlando, Smajic and Nyarko (all injured) and without Foda (not yet in the squad). 67th minute: shot from FCB player Henry hits the crossbar.

22 February 1997 Winter break	Basel (Switzerland)	1–0	(Switzerland) Luzern	St. Jakob Stadium, Basel
15:00	Falub 24' (1:0)	FCB summary		Attendance: 4,700; Referee: (Switzerland) Andreas Schluchter (Schönenbuch)
Note: FCB without Poulard, Frick, Smajic, Orlando (all injured) and Armentano (not in the squad). FCL without Aleksandrov, Fink, T. Wyss (all injured) and Sawu (Zimbabwe national team). 63rd minute after Sutter's substitution, Henry in central midfield. 78th minute after Foda's substitution, Nyarko as libero, Konde in midfield. Bumpy pitch. FCB debut for Franco Foda.

=== Nationalliga A ===
This was the second season that three points were awarded to the winning team.

==== Qualification phase ====
The first stage of the NLA began on 10 July 1996 and was completed on 1 December. The top eight teams in the qualification phase would advance to the championship group and the last four teams would play against relegation.

10 July 1996 Round 1	Aarau	0–1	Basel	Stadion Brügglifeld, Aarau
20:00	Georgiev (yellow card) 89'	FCB summary FCA summary	58' (0:1) La Placa; (yellow card) 74' Smajić	Attendance: 7,900; Referee: (Switzerland) Dieter Schoch (Attiswil)
Note: Aarau were without Heldmann, Kilian, Skrzypczak, Zitola (all injured) and Benito (suspended). Basel were without Sutter (injured). Yakin was taken out with a concussion and Zuffi with a strain.

17 July 1996 Round 2	Basel	0–1	Xamax	St. Jakob Stadium, Basel
20:00	Orlando (yellow card) 21'; Frick (yellow card) 29'	FCB summary	(yellow card) 18' Vernier; 88' (0:1) Isabella	Attendance: 16,000; Referee: (Switzerland) Karl Strässle (Steinach)
Note: Basel were without Sutter, Zuffi and Grüter (all injured).

24 July 1996 Round 3	Basel	P–P	Luzern	St. Jakob Stadium, Basel
20:00

27 July 1996 Round 4	Young Boys	0–3 FF	Basel	Wankdorf Stadium, Bern
20:00	Okolosi 27' (1:0); Neqrouz (yellow card) 82'; Gerber (yellow card) 38' (goal) 85' (2:2)	FCB summary	(yellow card) 23' Tabakovic (1:1) Nyarko; (yellow card) 44' Orlando; 64' (1:2) Frick	Attendance: 8,000; Referee: (Switzerland) Marcel Vollenweider (Rüti, Zürich)
Note: YB without Malacarne, FCB without Zuffi (both injured). 39th minute, Okolosis' goal disallowed for offside. 50th minute, Lengen's header hits the post. 83rd minute, Nyarkos' free kick hits the post. Original score 2–2. Forfeit victory for FCB because YB used an unqualified player, Erol Bekirovski.

31 July 1996 Round 5	St. Gallen	1–0	Basel	Espenmoos, St. Gallen
20:00	Allenspach 50' (1:0); Motaung (yellow card) 81'	FCB summary	(yellow card) 30' Dominic Moser; (yellow card) 52' Ceccaroni; (yellow card) 82' Armentano; (yellow card) 90' Smajić	Attendance: 10,000; Referee: (Switzerland) Werner Müller (Obererlinsbach)
Note: St. Gallen were without Mouidi and Nyathi. FCB without Zuffi (both were injured).

3 August 1996 Round 6	Basel	1–1	Servette	St. Jakob Stadium, Basel
20:00	La Placa 34' (1:1); Frick (yellow card) 37'; La Placa (yellow card) 72'	FCB summary	7' (0:1) Pouget; (yellow card) 35' Müller; (yellow card) 65' Margarini	Attendance: 7,500; Referee: (Switzerland) Dieter Schoch (Attiswil)
Note: FCB were without Zuffi (injured). Servette were without Fernandez, Sesa, Juarez and Nava (all injured).

11 August 1996 Round 7	Sion	2–2	Basel	Stade Tourbillon, Sion
18:00	Kombouaré 8' (1:0); Gaspoz (yellow card) 41'; Bonvin 85' (2:2)	FCB summary	30' (1:1) Nyarko; 32' (1:2) Frick; (yellow card) 75' Zuffi	Attendance: 9,800; Referee: (Switzerland) Carlo Bertolini (Vira-Gambarogno)
Note: Sion without Colombo, Yenay, Lonfat (all in the youth ranks) and Pancev (not in the squad). Basel without Salvi (injured). Yakin and Frick taken out with knee injuries.

17 August 1996 Round 8	Basel	4–5	Grasshopper Club	St. Jakob Stadium, Basel
20:00	H. Yakin 10' (1:0); H. Yakin 12' (2:0); Frick 35' (3:3); Giallanza 90' (4:5)	FCB summary	(yellow card) 6' Gämperle; 13' (2:1) Moldovan; 14' (2:2) Moldovan; 20' (2:3) Türkyilmaz; 42' (3:4) Comisetti; (yellow card) 59' Esposito; (yellow card) 64' (yellow-red card) 82' Thüler; 73' (3:5) Türkyilmaz	Attendance: 14,000; Referee: (Switzerland) Serge Muhmenthaler (Grenchen)
Note: FCB without Disseris (injured), Hasler and Moser (both with youth team). GC without Abdullahi, Subiat, Vogel, Geiger, Lombardo (all injured). 42nd minute: Magnin header hits the post (before the 3-4). 79th minute: a shot from Frick hits the crossbar. Zuffi substituted with a mild concussion.

24 August 1996 Round 9	Lugano	1–1	Basel	Cornaredo, Lugano
20:00	Bugnard (yellow card) 65'; Giannini (yellow card) 48'; Giannini 86' (1:1)	FCB summary	(yellow card) 50' H. Yakin; 68' (0:1) Giallanza	Attendance: 3,300; Referee: (Switzerland) Kurt Zuppinger (Bremgarten, Aargau)
Note: Lugano were without Gentinzon, Sinval (both injured) and Belloni (military service). Basel were without Frick, Salvi and Disseris (all injured).

27 August 1996 Round 3	Basel	2–2	Luzern	St. Jakob Stadium, Basel
20:00	La Placa 4' (1:0); Smajić (yellow card) 68'; Frick 88' (pen. 2:2)	FCB summary	(yellow card) 27' (yellow-red card) 66' Fink; 33' (1:1) Sermeter; 78' (1:2) Wolf	Attendance: 7,500; Referee: (Liechtenstein) Roland Beck (Triesenberg)
Note: Rescheduled from 24 July after postponement. FCB without Moser, Salvi, and Disseris (all injured). FCL without Aleksandrov, Bachmann, van Eck (all injured), and Mutter (suspended). Giallanza left the field with a shoulder injury and is expected to be out for two weeks.

4 September 1996 Round 10	Basel	2–4	Lausanne-Sport	St. Jakob Stadium, Basel
20:00	Nyarko (yellow card) 19'; Frick (yellow card) 65' (goal) 30' (1:0); Giallanza 90+1' (2:4)	FCB summary	32' (1:1) Udovič; (yellow card) 36' Ohrel; 40' (1:2) Sané; (yellow card) 53' Iglesias; 76' (1:3) Douglas; 84' (1:4) Douglas	Attendance: 7,500; Referee: (Switzerland) Markus Nobs (Wohlen bei Bern)
Note: FCB without Huber, Disseris, Moser (all injured) and Smajic (suspended). Lausanne without Hänzi (injured). Falub's debut match for FCB. 52nd minute, Sutter left the game injured.

7 September 1996 Round 11	Zürich	1–1	Basel	Letzigrund, Zürich
20:00	Mazzarelli 77' (1:1)	FCZ summary FCB summary	(yellow card) 36' Ceccaroni; 38' (0:1) Giallanza; (yellow card) 73' Grüter; (yellow card) 75' Salvi	Attendance: 10,500; Referee: (Switzerland) Urs Meier (Wettingen and Würenlos)
Note: FCZ without Di Jorio (suspended), Baldassarri and Ziegler (injured). FCB without Frick (suspended), Huber, Nyarko, Kondé and Moser (all injured). National coach Rolf Fringer in the stands. 43rd minute a goal from FCB player Sutter was disallowed for offside.

14 September 1996 Round 12	Basel	2–0	Aarau	St. Jakob Stadium, Basel
20:00	Falub (yellow card) 4'; Armentano 18' (1:0); Armentano (yellow card) 18'; Nyarko 24' (2:0); Frick (yellow card) 90'	FCB summary FCA summary	(yellow card) 12' Bader; (yellow card) 66' Wiederkehr; (yellow card) 41' Christ	Attendance: 7,000; Referee: (Switzerland) Jürg Herrmann (Hinterkapplen (Wohlen bei Bern))
Note: FCB ohne Moser, Konde (verletzt). FCA ohne Kilian, Heldmann (verletzt) und De Napoli (gesperrt)

18 September 1996 Round 13	Xamax	3–3	Basel	Stade de la Maladière (1924), Neuchâtel
20:00	Leśniak 18' (1:0); Kunz 19' (2:0); Gigon (yellow card) 21'; Gigon 43' (3:1)	FCB summary	(yellow card) 11' Frick; 36' (2:1) La Placa; 55' (3:2) Giallanza; (yellow card) 56' Smajić; 67' (3:3) Frick	Attendance: 7,200; Referee: (Switzerland) Claude Detruche (Thônex)
Note: Xamax were without Sandjak, Vernier (both injured) and Cyprien (suspended). FCB without Armentano (suspended).

28 September 1996 Round 14	Luzern	0–3	Basel	Stadion Allmend Luzern
20:00		FCB summary	19' (0:1) Giallanza; 19' (0:2) La Placa; (yellow card) 34' La Placa; 45' (0:3) Giallanza	Attendance: 14,850; Referee: (Switzerland) Carlo Bertolini (Vira-Gambarogno)
Note: FCL without Moser, Sermeter, Gmür (all suspended) and Aleksandrov (injured). FCB without Sutter (injured). 80th minute: a shot from Fink hit the post.

9 October 1996 Round 15	Basel	1–1	Young Boys	St. Jakob Stadium, Basel
20:00	Giallanza 10' (1:0); Giallanza (yellow card) 76'	FCB summary	(yellow card) 8' Neqrouz; 35' (1:1) Okolosi; (yellow card) 44' Streun; (yellow card) 56' Ivanov; (yellow card) 79' Okolosi	Attendance: 10,500; Referee: (Switzerland) Marcel Vollenweider (Rüti, Zürich)
Note: FCB were without Frick (national team) and Salvi (injured). YB were without Pulver, Malacarne, and Camenzind (all injured). After the break, La Placa played as a striker, with Konde on the right wing.

13 October 1996 Round 16	Basel	2–2	St. Gallen	St. Jakob Stadium, Basel
14:30	Orlando (yellow card) 19'; Giallanza 39' (1:1); Zuffi (yellow card) 79'; H. Yakin 85' (2:2)	FCB summary	(yellow card) 4' Motaung; 27' (0:1) Regtop; (yellow card) 35' Mouidi; (yellow card) 65' Eugster; (yellow card) 69' Brunner; 75' (1:2) Dittgen; (yellow card) 90' Dittgen	Attendance: 14,000; Referee: (Switzerland) Serge Muhmenthaler (Grenchen)
Note: FCB ohne Salvi, Moser und Hasler (im Nachwuchs). St. Gallen ohne Dal Santo (verletzt).

20 October 1996 Round 17	Servette	2–0	Basel	Charmilles Stadium, Geneva
14:30	Nava 12' (1:0); Němeček 25' (2:0); Pizzinat (yellow card) 31'; Němeček (yellow card) 53'	FCB summary	(yellow card) 11' Zuffi	Attendance: 4,500; Referee: (Switzerland) Jürg Herrmann (Hinterkapplen (Wohlen bei Bern))
Note: Servette were without Sogbie, Barea (both injured), Sesa and Rey (both suspended). FCB without Nyarko, Frick, Giallanza (all injured) and Orlando (suspended). Basel reverted to a four-man backline after Salvis substiution on. Gamberini's debut for FCB.

27 October 1996 Round 18	Basel	0–3	Sion	St. Jakob Stadium, Basel
14:30	Salvi (yellow card) 44'; H. Yakin (yellow card) 78'	FCB summary	17' (0:1) Chassot; 34' (0:2) Bonvin; (yellow card) 49' Biaggi; (yellow card) 55' Lehmann; 75' (0:3) Vercruysse	Attendance: 8,500; Referee: (Switzerland) Claude Detruche (Thônex)
Note: FCB without Zuffi (suspended), Nyarko and Giallanza (both injured). Sion were without Lukic (injured).

3 November 1996 Round 19	Grasshopper Club	4–2	Basel	Hardturm, Zürich
14:30	Esposito 4' (1:0); Moldovan 15' (2:0); Moldovan 22' (3:0); Smiljanić (yellow card) 54'; Subiat 86' (4:2)	FCB summary	32' (3:1) Armentano; (yellow card) 58' Poulard; 70' (3:2) Nyarko	Attendance: 12,750; Referee: (Switzerland) Dieter Schoch (Attiswil)
Note: GC without Abdullahi (injured) and Gämperle (suspended). FCB without La Placa, Giallanza (both injured), Salvi (suspended) and Moser (not in the squad). After the Tabakovic-Armentano substitution, Basel switches from 5-3-2 to 4-4-2. After Yakin's substitution, Disseris in midfield, Frick in attack. 30th minute, a free kick from Frick onto the crossbar.

17 November 1996 Round 20	Basel	2–0	Lugano	St. Jakob Stadium, Basel
14:30	Giallanza 42' (1:0); Giallanza 55' (2:0); Nyarko (yellow card) 86'	FCB summary	(yellow card) 24' Morf; (yellow card) 62' Karić	Attendance: 7,500; Referee: (Switzerland) Urs Meier (Wettingen and Würenlos)
Note: FCB without Orlando and Moser (both injured), Poulard and Tabakovic (both not in the squad). Lugano without Giannini (suspended), Fusi (with the youth team), Penzavalli, Gentizon and Sinval (all injured). 14th minute: a shot from Lugano player Karic hit the crossbar. 37th minute: a shot from FCB player Smajic hit the post.

24 November 1996 Round 21	Lausanne-Sport	0–0	Basel	Olympique de la Pontaise, Lausanne
14:30	Iglesias (yellow card) 61'; Ohrel (yellow card) 88'	FCB summary	(yellow card) 81' Frick; (yellow card) 82' Disseris	Attendance: 5,100; Referee: (Switzerland) Carlo Bertolini (Vira-Gambarogno)
Note: Lausanne were without Savovic, Fryand, Oggier (all injured) and Streltsow (not yet qualified). FCB without Nyarko, Tabakovic (both suspended) and Orlando (injured).

1 December 1996 Round 22	Basel	0–0	Zürich	St. Jakob Stadium, Basel
14:30	Disseris (yellow card) 9'; Falub (yellow card) 84'	FCB summary FCZ summary	(yellow card) 22' Gambino; (yellow card) 42' Di Jorio; (yellow card) 45' Tarone	Attendance: 21,000; Referee: (Switzerland) Urs Meier (Wettingen and Würenlos)
Note: FCB without Frick (suspended) and Orlando (injured). FCZ without Studer (suspended). Mazzarelli left the field with a laceration on his instep.

==== Qualification table ====
Pos	Team	Pld	W	D	L	GF	GA	GD	Pts	Qualification
1	Xamax	22	12	8	2	36	20	+16	44	Advance to championship round halved points (rounded up) as bonus
2	Grasshopper Club	22	10	9	3	42	27	+15	39	Advance to championship round halved points (rounded up) as bonus
3	Sion	22	9	10	3	33	21	+12	37	Advance to championship round halved points (rounded up) as bonus
4	Aarau	22	9	8	5	21	14	+7	35	Advance to championship round halved points (rounded up) as bonus
5	Lausanne-Sports	22	9	7	6	35	32	+3	34	Advance to championship round halved points (rounded up) as bonus
6	St. Gallen	22	6	10	6	20	26	−6	28	Advance to championship round halved points (rounded up) as bonus
7	Zürich	22	6	9	7	24	25	−1	27	Advance to championship round halved points (rounded up) as bonus
8	Basel	22	5	11	6	32	32	0	26	Advance to championship round halved points (rounded up) as bonus
9	Servette	22	5	9	8	24	25	−1	24	Continue to promotion/relegation round
10	Luzern	22	4	11	7	27	32	−5	23	Continue to promotion/relegation round
11	Lugano	22	2	9	11	14	32	−18	15	Continue to promotion/relegation round
12	Young Boys	22	3	3	16	17	39	−22	12	Continue to promotion/relegation round

Source: rsssf.com
Rules for classification: 1) Points; 2) Goal difference; 3) Goals scored; 4) Head-to-head points; 5) Away goals scored; 6) Draw.

==== Championship group ====
The first eight teams of the qualification phase competed in the Championship round. The teams took half of the points (rounded up to complete units) gained in the qualification as bonus with them. The championship group started on 2 March 1997 and was completed on 4 June.

2 March 1997 Round 1	Basel	1–0	Zürich	St. Jakob Stadium, Basel
15:00	Zuffi (yellow card) 3'; Giallanza (yellow card) 22' (goal) 55' (pen. 1:0); Ceccaroni (yellow card) 84'	FCB summary FCZ summary	(yellow card) 9' Andersen; (yellow card) 55' Shorunmu; (yellow card) 87' Konjić	Attendance: 22,000; Referee: (Switzerland) Kurt Zuppinger (Bremgarten, Aargau)
Note: FCZ without Poulard, Frick, and Orlando (all injured) and without Disseris (suspended); FCZ without Tarone, Gambino, and Studer (all suspended). 10th-minute, goal from FCB player Giallanza was disallowed for offside. 25th minute, shot from Giallanza hit the post. 57th minute, shot from FCZ player Castillo hit the post.

9 March 1997 Round 2	Aarau	2–1	Basel	Stadion Brügglifeld, Aarau
14:30	Christ (yellow card) 21'; Ćirić 66' (1:0); Bader (yellow card); Hodel 84' (2:1)	FCB summary FCA summary	(yellow card) 17' Falub; (yellow card) 44' (yellow-red card) 59' Foda; 79' (1:1) Giallanza; (yellow card) 87' H. Yakin	Attendance: 9,700; Referee: (Switzerland) Dieter Schoch (Attiswil)
Note: FCA without Heldmann (injured). FCB without Frick, Orlando and Smajic (all injured). After Sutter's substitution, Henry played on the right of midfield. After Foda's dismissal, Nyarko in defense, Knup in midfield. 71st minute, Studer left the pitch with a torn capsule and ligaments, from then on Hodel in defense, Brugnoli in midfield.

23 March 1997 Round 3	Basel	0–1	Sion	St. Jakob Stadium, Basel
15:00	Ceccaroni (yellow card) 31'	FCB summary	(yellow card) 13' Quentin; 20' (0:1) Ouattara; (yellow card) 83' Murray	Attendance: 15,000; Referee: (Switzerland) Carlo Bertolini (Vira-Gambarogno)
Note: FCB were without Knup (who reported groin problems after the warm-up) and Zuffi (torn muscle fiber), as well as Frick, Henry, Poulard, Salvi, and Orlando (all injured). Heinz Hermann (sporting director) and Markus Schupp made their debuts for FC Basel. Sion were without Bonvin, Gaspoz, Sylvestre, Bertone, Quennoz, and Milton (all injured).

26 March 1997 Round 4	Xamax	3–0	Basel	Stade de la Maladière (1924), Neuchâtel
20:00	Kunz 19' (1:0); Perret (yellow card) 45'; Wittl 65' (2:0); Cyprien 90' (3:0)	FCB summary	(yellow card) 60' Reimann	Attendance: 8,800; Referee: (Switzerland) Urs Meier (Wettingen and Würenlos)
Note: Xamax were without Rueda and Pana (both injured). Basel were without Frick, Henry, Knup, Orlando, Zuffi, and Schupp (all injured). Among the spectators were Rino Foschi (sporting director of Hellas Verona) and Winnie Schäfer (coach of Karlsruher SC). Smajic, due to fatigue, and Tabakovic had to leave the field injured.

5 April 1997 Round 5	Basel	1–2	St. Gallen	St. Jakob Stadium, Basel
20:00	Giallanza 67' (1:0)	FCB summary	(yellow card) 30' Allenspach; 81' (1:1) Regtop; 88' (1:2) Regtop	Attendance: 7,400; Referee: (Switzerland) Claude Detruche (Thônex)
Note: FCB without Nyarko (back injury), Disseris (fracture of the maxillary sinus after a training collision with Yakin), Frick, Zuffi, Henry and Orlando (all injured); St. Gallen without Dittgen and Eugster (both injured). Before the game, Admir Smajic was officially farewelled.

13 April 1997 Round 6	Grasshopper Club	4–1	Basel	Hardturm, Zürich
14:30	Türkyilmaz 39' (1:1); Moldovan 56' (pen 2:1); Vogel 57' (3:1); Haas (yellow card) 61'; Vogel 68' (4:1)	FCB summary	(yellow card) 20' Nyarko; 32' (0:1) Bruno Sutter; (yellow card) 35' Huber; (yellow card) 38' Giallanza	Attendance: 11,000; Referee: (Switzerland) Dominique Tavel (Lonay)
Note: GC without Abdullahi and Gämperle (both injured). Basel were without Disseris, Frick, Henry, Orlando, and Hakan Yakin (all injured). Foda (thigh contusion), Tabakovic (bursitis) and Murat Yakin (foot injury) were forced off injured. 47th minute: Nyarko played as libero, Konde in midfield. 63rd minute: Schupp played on the right wing, Falub in the center. In the stands as spectators: Joachim Löw (coach of VfB Stuttgart) and Winnie Schäfer (coach of Karlsruher SC).

19 April 1997 Round 7	Lausanne-Sport	2–0	Basel	Olympique de la Pontaise, Lausanne
20:00	Hänzi 17' (1:0); Douglas (yellow card) 52'; Sané 83' (2:0)	FCB summary	(yellow card) 16' Huber; (yellow card) 31' Knup; (yellow card) 35' Foda	Attendance: 8,000; Referee: (Switzerland) Kurt Zuppinger (Bremgarten, Aargau)
Note: Lausanne without Gualco, Oggier (both injured) and Savovic (ill). Basel without Frick, Disseris, Henry, Yakin, Orlando and Schupp (all injured). - 78th minute: Salvi deflects the ball onto his own post.

24 April 1997 Round 8	Basel	3–2	Lausanne-Sport	St. Jakob Stadium, Basel
20:00	Giallanza 29' (1:1); Giallanza 35' (2:1); Kondé (yellow card) 79'; Nyarko 79' (3:2)	FCB summary	8' (0:1) Sané; (yellow card) 31' Iglesias; 59', 22' Rehn; (yellow card) 66' (yellow-red card) 87' Piffaretti	Attendance: 4,000; Referee: (Switzerland) Carlo Bertolini (Vira-Gambarogno)
Note: FCB without Huber, Yakin, Henry, Frick, Orlando, Disseris, Schupp (all injured) and Knup (ill); Lausanne were without Oggier, Gualco (injured), Triki (called up to the Moroccan national team) and Savovic (ill). 6th minute: Basel goalkeeper Grüter deflects Udovic's header onto the crossbar. 41st minute: a goal by Piffaretti disallowed for offside. 42nd minute: Iglesias was substituted out with a concussion, but was not replaced until after halftime.

3 May 1997 Round 9	Basel	3–3	Grasshopper Club	St. Jakob Stadium, Basel
20:00	Knup 7' (1:0); Giallanza 23' (2:1); Kondé (yellow card) 43'; Knup 72' (3:2)	FCB summary	(yellow card) 15' Smiljanić; 19' (1:1) Moldovan; (yellow card) 35' Haas; 43' (2:2) Türkyilmaz; 76' (3:3) Magnin; (yellow card) 80' Ahinful	Attendance: 13,000; Referee: (Switzerland) Urs Meier (Wettingen and Würenlos)
Note: FCB without Huber, Schupp, Henry, Disseris, and Orlando (all injured). GC without Subiat (suspended), Gämperle, Gren, Yakin, and Abdullahi (all injured). National coach Rolf Fringer was in the stands. 16th-minute, goal from Tabakovic was disallowed due to an alleged foul by Konde on Vogel. 76th minute. a shot from Magnin hit the crossbar. Grüter was substituted at halftime after suffering a partial tear of the medial collateral ligament in his left knee. Youth team goalkeeper Oliver Stöckli made his first team debut and played second half

10 May 1997 Round 10	St. Gallen	2–1	Basel	Espenmoos, St. Gallen
17:30	Regtop 18' (1:0); Hellinga (yellow card) 57'; Allenspach (yellow card) 61'; Tsawa (yellow card) 74'; Contini (yellow card) 76'; Regtop 82' (2:1); Regtop (yellow card) 82'	FCB summary	22' Giallanza; (yellow card) 25' Foda; (yellow card) 43' (yellow-red card) 79' Giallanza; (yellow card) 45' Falub; (red card) 84' Andracchio (head-coach, not on pitch)	Attendance: 8,500; Referee: (Switzerland) Jürg Herrmann (Hinterkapplen (Wohlen bei Bern))
Note: St. Gallen were without Bühlmann (suspended), Brunner, Dittgen, Koch, and Mouidi (all injured), as well as Meyer (U16 European Championship). FCB were without Disseris, Henry, Orlando, and reserve goalkeeper Grüter (all injured). National coach Rolf Fringer was in the stands. In the 79th minute, Foda received a second yellow card (second booking). In the 84th minute, Basel's interim coach Andracchio was sent to the stands.

15 May 1997 Round 11	Basel	1–3	Xamax	St. Jakob Stadium, Basel
20:00	Knup 39' (pen. 1:0); Frick (yellow card) 44'; Tabakovic (yellow card) 48'	FCB summary	(yellow card) 39' Corminbœuf; 47' (1:1) Leśniak; 52' (1:2) Isabella; (yellow card) 65' Martin Rueda; 80' (1:3) Wittl	Attendance: 6,000; Referee: (Switzerland) Serge Muhmenthaler (Grenchen)
Note: FCB without Salvi, Grüter, Disseris, Henry, Orlando (all injured), Giallanza and Foda (suspended); Xamax without Bonalair (injured). 69th minute: unpunished foul by Rothenbühler on Tabakovic.

24 May 1997 Round 12	Sion	1–0	Basel	Stade Tourbillon, Sion
20:00	Lukić 32' (1:0); Wicky (yellow card) 43'	FCB summary	(yellow card) 45' Kondé; (yellow card) 53' Schupp	Attendance: 11,000; Referee: (Switzerland) Kurt Zuppinger (Bremgarten, Aargau)
Note: Sion were without Grichting, Bonvin, Chassot, Sylvestre (all injured) and Bertone (suspended). Basel were without Poulard, Salvi, Nyarko, Grüter, Disseris, Henry and Orlando (all injured). 8th minute, goal Ouattara was disallowed (foul on Huber). In the stands: Giuseppe Giannini (free agent Italian midfielder).

31 May 1997 Round 13	Basel	3–2	Aarau	St. Jakob Stadium, Basel
20:00	Giallanza 49' (1:0); Knup 54' (2:0); Knup 60' (3:0); Ceccaroni (yellow card) 72'	FCB summary FCA summary	77' (3:1) Brugnoli; 90+1' (3:2) Kilian	Attendance: 6,000; Referee: (Switzerland) Werner Müller (Obererlinsbach)
Note: FCB without Konde, Schupp (both suspended), Poulard, Salvi, Grüter, Henry, Disseris, and Orlando (all injured). FCA without Heldmann, Kirik, Wiederkehr, and Saibene (all injured). 72nd minute: Viceconte substituted out due to injury. Last NLA match for referee Müller. No official farewell for the FCB players, who are already confirmed to be leaving today.

4 June 1997 Round 14	Zürich	1–1	Basel	Letzigrund, Zürich
20:00	Studer (yellow card) 39'; Studer 74' (1:1)	FCZ summary FCB summary	50' (0:1) La Placa	Attendance: 4,800; Referee: (Switzerland) Markus Nobs (Wohlen bei Bern)
Note: FCZ without Shorunmu (national team), Di Jorio, Pallay, Szubert (all injured), Walker and Weiler (both suspended). FCB without Disseris, Salvi, Grüter, Henry, Poulard, Orlando (all injured), Ceccaroni (suspended), Nyarko, Tabakovic (ill), Knup (on vacation) and Huber (only a backup goalkeeper due to foot problems). Studer and Walker were bid farewell by FC Zurich. Among the spectators: Thomas Bickel from Vissel Kobe whose contract ended and he now retired.

==== Final league table ====
Pos	Team	Pld	W	D	L	GF	GA	GD	BP	Pts	Qualification
1	Sion	14	9	3	2	18	10	+8	19	49	Swiss champions, qualified for 1997–98 Champions League
2	Xamax	14	6	6	2	22	14	+8	22	46	qualified for 1997–98 UEFA Cup
3	Grasshopper Club	14	7	4	3	37	18	+19	20	45	qualified for 1997–98 UEFA Cup
4	Lausanne-Sports	14	8	2	4	20	16	+4	17	43	entered 1997 UEFA Intertoto Cup
5	Aarau	14	3	4	7	17	22	−5	18	31	entered 1997 UEFA Intertoto Cup
6	St. Gallen	14	3	4	7	13	26	−13	14	27	
7	Zürich	14	1	7	6	9	18	−9	14	24	
8	Basel	14	3	2	9	16	28	−12	13	24	

Source: rsssf.com
Rules for classification: 1) points; 2) Position in the qualification.

=== Swiss Cup ===
The first-tier clubs from the 1994–95 NLA were granted byes for the first two rounds, eight of these teams joined the competition in the third round. The four clubs that were competing in the UEFA European competitions, Grasshopper Club (1996–97 Champions League), Xamax, Aarau (both 1996–97 UEFA Cup) and Sion (1996–97 Cup Winners' Cup) were granted byes for this round as well. The eight participating first-tier teams were seeded and cound not be drawn against each other. The draw respected regionalities, when possible, and the lower classed team was granted home advantage.

22 September 1996 Round 3	FC Münsingen	1–3 (a.e.t.)	Basel	Sportanlage Sandreutenen, Münsingen
14:30	Moreno (yellow card) 17'; Bruttin 90' (1:1); P. Leimgruber (yellow card) 102'	Summary	(yellow card) 30' Tabakovic; 36' (0:1) Nyarko; (yellow card) 49' Giallanza; (yellow card) 70' Smajić; 98' (1:2) Frick; 117' (1:3) Armentano	Attendance: 1,800; Referee: (Switzerland) Vincent Dafflon
Note: FCB without La Placa and Sutter (both injured).

15 March 1997 Round 4	Basel	2–1	Young Boys	St. Jakob Stadium, Basel
20:00	Giallanza (yellow card) 20'; Kondé 26' (1:1); La Placa 46' (2:1); Kondé (yellow card) 70'; Tabakovic (yellow card) 88'; H. Yakin (yellow card) 90'	FCB summary YB summary	(yellow card) 5' Baumann; 21' (0:1) Okolosi; (yellow card) 65' Lengen	Attendance: 11,000; Referee: (Switzerland) Marcel Vollenweider (Rüti, Zürich)
Note: FCB without Henry, Orlando, Smajic, and Sutter (all injured) as well as Foda (suspended). YB were without Bekirovski and Rotzetter (both injured) as well as Gianinazzi (suspended). In the stands: Markus Schupp (HSV) and national team coach Rolf Fringer.

29 March 1997 Round 5	Basel	1–4	Servette	St. Jakob Stadium, Basel
20:00	Foda (yellow card) 4'; Schupp 79' (pen. 1:3)	FCB Summary	5' (pen. 0:1) Sesa; (yellow card) 10' Němeček; (yellow card) 17' Margarini; 35' (0:2) Cantaluppi; (yellow card) 45' Juárez; (yellow card) 67' Cantaluppi; 70' (0:3) Karlen; 83' (o.g. 1:4) Schupp	Attendance: 10,000; Referee: (Switzerland) Dieter Schoch (Attiswil)
Note: FCB without Giallanza, Tabakovic (both suspended), Frick, Henry, Orlando, and Zuffi (injured). Servette without Ippoliti and Fatusi (injured). 43rd minute: a shot from Schupp hit the post. Second-half, after La Placa's substitution in, Konde played in the defense. Rolf Fringer and Marco Walker (1860 Munich) were among the spectators.

=== Intertoto Cup ===
The competition was played in the group stage pre-season from 22 June 1996 to 20 July. The semi-finals were held mid-season, on 27 July and the return legs on 31 July. The finals were held on 6 August with the return legs on 20 August. The winning teams advanced to the UEFA Cup.

==== Group 7 matches ====
22 June 1996 Round 1	Basel (Switzerland)	2–2	(Ukraine) Shakhtar Donetsk	St. Jakob Stadium, Basel
10:15	Zuffi 12' (1:0); H. Yakin 80' (2:2)	FCB summary	22' (1:1) Ostachov; (yellow card) 29' Jaksmanutski; (yellow card) 45' Pyatenko; 57' (1:2) Pyatenko	Attendance: 2,000; Referee: (Croatia) Darko Cvitkovic
Note: FCB were without Smajic, Cantaluppi, Moser (all injured) as well as without La Placa, Giallanza and Frick (all not yet eligible to play).

29 June 1997 Round 2	Antalyaspor (Turkey)	2–5	(Switzerland) Basel	Isparta Atatürk Stadium, Isparta
17:30	Aliriza 2' (1:0); Nuri 34' (2:3); Murat (yellow card) 39'	FCB summary	23' (1:1) Smajić; 25' (1:2) Moser; 29' (1:3) H. Yakin; 56' (2:4) Giallanza; (yellow card) 57' Poulard; 61' (2:5) La Placa; (yellow card) 69' Frick; (yellow card) 85' Armentano	Attendance: 4,600; Referee: (Romania) Gheorghe Constantin
Note: FCB without Nyarko (ill), Zuffi, Sutter, Disseris, Hasler (all injured), Huber (family), Antalyaspor without Ginchev (holiday after national team duty with Bulgaria).

13 July 1996 Round 3	Basel (Switzerland)	5–0	(Belarus) Ataka-Aura Minsk	St. Jakob Stadium, Basel
20:00	Nyarko 20' (1:0); Moser 22' (2:0); La Placa 42' (3:0); Frick 53' (4:0); Armentano 67' (5:0); Salvi (yellow card) 89'	FCB summary	(yellow card) 50' Ermakovich; (penalty missed) 89′ Malejew	Attendance: 4,200; Referee: Vanco Kocev (Macedonia)
Note: FCB without Sutter, Zuffi, Smajic, Hasler and Yakin (all injured). 59th minute: Frick hits the post. 89th minute: Huber saves Malejew's penalty.

20 July 1996 Round 4	Rotor Volgograd (Russia)	3–2	(Switzerland) Basel	Central Stadium, Volgograd
18:00	Niederhaus 18' (1:0); Yesipov 38' (2:2); Veretennikov 57' (3:2); Yesipov (yellow card) 61'	FCB summary	29' (1:1) Orlando; 30' (1:2) Giallanza; (yellow card) 31' Giallanza; (yellow card) 49' Salvi	Attendance: 8,000; Referee: Branimir Babarogić (FR Yugoslavia)
Note: Rotor without Schmarko and Berketow (both suspended), Basel without Zuffi, Sutter and Yakin (all injured).

==== Group 7 table ====
Pos	Team	Pld	W	D	L	GF	GA	GD	Pts	Qualification	ROT	BAS	ANT	SHA	AAM
1	(Russia) Rotor Volgograd	4	3	0	1	12	5	+7	9	Advanced to semi-finals	—	3–2	—	4–1	—
2	(Switzerland) Basel	4	2	1	1	14	7	+7	7		—	—	—	2–2	5–0
3	(Turkey) Antalyaspor	4	2	0	2	7	7	0	6		2–1	2–5	—	—	—
4	(Ukraine) Shakhtar Donetsk	4	1	1	2	5	8	−3	4		—	—	1–0	—	1–2
5	(Belarus) Ataka-Aura Minsk	4	1	0	3	2	13	−11	3		0–4	—	0–3	—	—

Source: rsssf.com
Rules for classification: 1) Points; 2) Goal difference; 3) Goals scored; 4) Head-to-head points; 5) Away goals scored; 6) Draw.

== See also ==
- History of FC Basel
- List of FC Basel players
- List of FC Basel seasons

== Sources ==
- Rotblau: Jahrbuch Saison 2015/2016. Publisher: FC Basel Marketing AG. ISBN 978-3-7245-2050-4
- Die ersten 125 Jahre / 2018. Publisher: Josef Zindel im Friedrich Reinhardt Verlag, Basel. ISBN 978-3-7245-2305-5
- 1996–97 Verein "Basler Fussballarchiv” homepage
- FCB squad 1996–97 at Joggeli.ch
- 1996–97 at RSSSF
