= 1996–97 Swiss Cup =

Tournament details
- Country: Switzerland
- Teams: 156

Final positions
- Champions: Sion
- Runners-up: Luzern

Tournament statistics
- Matches played: 155

The 1996–97 Swiss Cup was the 72nd season of Switzerland's football cup competition organised annually by the Swiss Football Association. The competition began on 10 August with the first games of Round 1 and ended on 8 June 1997 with the Final held at the former Wankdorf in Bern. The winners earned a place in the first round of the Cup Winners' Cup.

== Overview ==
The competition began on the week-end of 10–11 August 1996 with the games of the first round and it ended on Sunday 8 June 1997 with the final, which was held at the former Wankdorf Stadium in Bern. The 12 clubs from the Nationalliga B were granted byes for the first round and the 12 clubs from the Nationalliga A were granted byes for the first two rounds. The winners of the cup qualified themselves for the first round of the Cup Winners' Cup in the following season.

When possible, the draw respected regionalities and the lower classed team was granted home advantage. In the entire competition, the matches were played in a single knockout format. In the event of a draw after 90 minutes, the match went into extra time. In the event of a draw at the end of extra time, a penalty shoot-out was to decide which team qualified for the next round. No replays were foreseen in the entire competition.

== Round 1 ==
In the first round a total of 132 amateur clubs participated from the third-tier and lower. Reserve teams were not admitted to the competition. The draw respected regionalities, when possible, and the lower classed team was granted home advantage.

Team 1	Score	Team 2
10–11 August 1995
Muttenz	1–0	Old Boys
SC Derendingen	0–2	Grenchen
ASI Audax-Friul	0–2	Serrières
FC Lutry	0–2	FC Renens
FC Sierre	2–0	FC Bramois
FC Chêne Aubonne	0–3	Bex
Agno	0–4	Bellinzona
FC Bonaduz	1–2	FC Glarus
FC Collex-Bossy	0–3	Chênois
FC Perlen-Buchrain	0–4	Zug 94
Uster	4–0	FC Juventina Wettingen
FC Amriswil	0–5	Brühl St. Gallen
FC Baar	1–1 (a.e.t.) (6–5 p)	Emmenbrücke
CS Belprahon	0–9	SV Lyss
FC Cheseaux	1–4	Baulmes
Lancy-Sports	2–3	FC Vernier
CS La Tour-de-Peilz	1–5	Stade Lausanne
SC Münchenbuchsee	0–4	Bümpliz
FC Pully	1–2	Vevey Sports
Rapperswil-Jona	2–1	FC Stäfa
FC Seefeld Zürich	6–2	SV Seebach (Zürich)
St-Blaise FC	1–3	La Chaux-de-Fonds
FC Bütschwil	0–2	FC Flawil
FC Courroux	4–2	FC Lamboing
FC Subingen	0–2	FC Klus-Balsthal
FC Schönenwerd	0–3	Schötz
FC Altdorf (Uri)	1–4	FC Suhr
Brugg	0–5	FC Altstetten (Zürich)
FC Entlebuch	0–6	Buochs
FC Gunzwil	0–3	FC Sursee
FC Nottwil	0–2	FC Muri
FC Seuzach	1–4	Red Star
FC Spreitenbach	0–1	FC Dübendorf
FC Visp	1–2	FC Raron
FC Willisau	0–3	FC Emmen
US Collombey-Muraz	0–1	Naters
FC Wülflingen	1–2	YF Juventus
CS Romontois	0–7	Fribourg
FC Savièse	3–2	Martigny-Sports
FC Donneloye	0–6	Montreux-Sports
Köniz	1–1 (a.e.t.) (5–6 p)	Münsingen
FC Therwil	0–9	FC Riehen
Breitenrain	1–3	FC Langenthal
FC Dietikon	0–2	Bülach
FC Fehraltorf	0–7	Freienbach
FC Konolfingen	2–1	FC Langnau
Central Fribourg	2–1	Bulle
FC Valmont-Montagny	0–3	Echallens
FC Noiraigue	2–1	Colombier
FC Trübbach	0–1	FC Rorschach
FC Bern	1–3	FC Lerchenfeld (Thun)
FC Bévilard	1–4	Biel-Bienne
Nordstern Basel	2–2 (a.e.t.) (1–2 p)	Concordia Basel
FC Uznach	0–2	Frauenfeld
FC Villmergen	0–4	FC Hochdorf
FC Kloten	2–0	SV Schaffhausen
FC Puplinge	0–5	Stade Nyonnais
Signal FC (Bernex)	3–2	Grand-Lancy
FC Saint-Gingolph	1–4	Monthey
AC Vallemaggia	0–2	Chiasso
FC Cornol-La Baroche	0–2	FC Bözingen 34
Losone Sportiva	0–1	FC Ascona
Biaschesi	1–0	Mendrisio
FC Ostermundigen	1–2	Thun
FC Sargans	3–1	Tuggen
Wohlen	3–0	FC Kölliken

== Round 2 ==
The teams from the 1996–97 Nationalliga B (NLB) were granted byes for the first round and joined the competition in the second round. These 12 teams were seeded and cound not be drawn against each other. The draw respected regionalities, when possible, and the lower classed team was granted home advantage.

- Teams from the 1. Liga (third-tier) against teams from the NLB:

Team 1	Score	Team 2
30–31 August 1996
FC Sursee	2–1	Baden
Vevey Sports	1–4	Étoile Carouge
Chênois	2–1	Meyrin
Echallens	0–1	Yverdon-Sports
FC Glarus	0–7	Wil

- Teams from the 2. Liga (fourth-tier) against teams from the NLB:

Team 1	Score	Team 2
30–31 August 1996
FC Tresa/Monteggio	0–1	Locarno
Blue Stars	1–6	FC Schaffhausen
Brühl	1–3	Gossau
Muttenz	0–2	Delémont
Uster	0–5	Winterthur
SC Emmen	1–3	Kriens

- Teams from the 3. Liga (fifth-tier) against teams from the NLB:

Team 1	Score	Team 2
31 August 1996
FC Konolfingen	0–11	Solothurn

- Teams from the 1. Liga amongst themselves:

Team 1	Score	Team 2
30–31 August 1996
Rapperswil-Jona	3–1 (a.e.t.)	Freienbach
Bex	1–1 (a.e.t.) (2–4 p)	Montreux-Sports
FC Hochdorf	1–0	FC Muri
Chiasso	1–2	Bellinzona
Fribourg	2–1 (a.e.t.)	Bümpliz
La Chaux-de-Fonds	1–4 (a.e.t.)	Serrières
Zug 94	5–1	Schötz
FC Riehen	5–3	FC Suhr
Thun	0–3	Münsingen
Stade Nyonnais	2–1	Stade Lausanne

- Teams from the 2. Liga (fourth-tier) against teams from the 1. Liga:

Team 1	Score	Team 2
30–31 August 1996
FC Effretikon	1–3	FC Altstetten (Zürich)
FC Bellach	2–3	Grenchen
FC Sierre	0–1	Monthey
FC Fislisbach	3–7	YF Juventus
FC Bözingen 34	0–5	SV Lyss
FC Lerchenfeld (Thun)	3–0	FC Klus-Balsthal
FC Flawil	0–2	FC Rorschach
FC Steg	0–3	Naters
FC Langenthal	1–2	Biel-Bienne
FC Seefeld Zürich	2–1	Red Star
FC Arlesheim	4–2	Concordia Basel
FC Kloten	2–5	Bülach
Kreuzlingen	4–1	Frauenfeld
FC Marly	1–2	Central Fribourg
FC Châtel-St.Denis	3–2 (a.e.t.)	FC Noiraigue
Signal FC (Bernex)	0–3	FC Renens
Biaschesi	0–1 * FF awd 3–0	FC Ascona

- Note to the match Biaschesi–Ascona; the result was annulled and game awarded as a 3–0 victory for Biaschesi because a player of Ascona was not qualified.
- Teams from the 3. Liga (fifth-tier) against teams from the 1. Liga:

Team 1	Score	Team 2
30–31 August 1996
FC Mellingen	0–2	Buochs
FC Schlieren	0–5	FC Dübendorf

- Teams from the 2. Liga amongst themselves:

Team 1	Score	Team 2
30–31 August 1996
FC Le Locle	0–0 (a.e.t.) (5–4 p)	Baulmes
FC Gland	1–1 (a.e.t.) (4–5 p)	FC Vernier
FC Einsiedeln	1–2	FC Sargans
FC Raron	4–3 (a.e.t.)	FC Savièse

- Teams from the 3. Liga (fifth-tier) against teams from the 2. Liga:

Team 1	Score	Team 2
30–31 August 1996
FC Baar	6–2	Wohlen
FC Courroux	0–1	Dornach
FC Uzwil	3–0	FC St. Margrethen

== Round 3 ==
The first-tier clubs from the 1994–95 Nationalliga A were granted byes for the first two rounds, eight of them joined the competition in this round. The four clubs that were competing in the UEFA European competitions, Grasshopper Club (1996–97 Champions League), Xamax, Aarau (both 1996–97 UEFA Cup) and Sion (1996–97 Cup Winners' Cup) were granted byes for this round as well. The eight participating first-tier teams were seeded and cound not be drawn against each other. The draw respected regionalities, when possible, and the lower classed team was granted home advantage.

=== Summary ===
Team 1	Score	Team 2
21 September 1996
FC Sargans	0–4	FC Altstetten
FC Seefeld ZH	0–3	Winterthur
FC Arlesheim	6–0	FC Le Locle
Biel-Bienne	0–2	FC Riehen
FC Châtel-St-Denis	1–3	Étoile-Carouge
Fribourg	4–0	Central Fribourg
Serrières	0–0 (a.e.t.) (5–4 p)	Solothurn
FC Sursee	0–2	Zug 94
Montreux-Sports	0–2	Servette
FC Renens	0–2	Monthey
FC Rorschach	0–4	St. Gallen
FC Baar	0–2	Bellinzona
Bülach	2–3	FC Wil
FC Raron	0–4	Chênois
Grenchen	0–3	Luzern
Locarno	0–3	Lugano
Stade Nyonnais	1–8	Lausanne-Sport
22 September 1996
Münsingen	1–3 (a.e.t.)	Basel
SR Delémont	1–2	Young Boys
Rapperswil-Jona	2–0	FC Dübendorf
FC Vernier	1–2	Naters
YF Juventus	0–1	FC Schaffhausen
Dornach	0–3	Yverdon-Sport
Biaschesi	0–4	Buochs
Kreuzlingen	0–1	Gossau
FC Uzwil	0–10	Zürich

- Grasshopper Club, Xamax, Aarau and Sion were granted byes for this round, because they were playing European competitions.

=== Matches ===
21 September 1996
15:00

FC Arlesheim	6–0	FC Le Locle
Huggel 34' (1:0); Kunz 44' (2:0); Huggel 45+6' (3:0); Chénaux 60' (4:0); De Jesus 70' (5:0); Huggel 74' (6:0)	RSSSF summary

In den Widen, Arlesheim
Attendance: 1,000

21 September 1996

Montreux-Sports	0–2	Servette
	Servette summary	12' (0:1) Fatusi; 48' (0:2) Fatusi

Stade de Chailly, Montreux

22 September 1996
14:30

FC Münsingen	1–3 (a.e.t.)	Basel
Moreno (yellow card) 17'; Bruttin 90' (1:1); P. Leimgruber (yellow card) 102'	Summary	(yellow card) 30' Tabakovic; 36' (0:1) Nyarko; (yellow card) 49' Giallanza; (yellow card) 70' Smajić; 98' (1:2) Frick; 117' (1:3) Armentano

Sportanlage Sandreutenen, Münsingen
Attendance: 1,800
Referee: (Switzerland) Vincent Dafflon

22 September 1996

SR Delémont	1–2	Young Boys
Marchand 17' (1:0)	YB summary	40' (1:1) Kehrli; 62' (1:2) Gerber

La Blancherie, Delémont
Attendance: 1.100
Referee: (Switzerland) Andreas Schluchter (Schönenbuch)

22 September 1996

FC Uzwil	0–10	Zürich
	FCZ summary	12' (0:1) Andersen; 28' (0:2) Andersen; 41' (0:3) Tarone; 50' (0:4) Tarone; 53' (0:5) Andersen; 60' (0:6) Castillo; 73' (0:7) Studer; 78' (0:5) Castillo; 82' (0:9) Mazzarelli; 88' (0:10) Di Jorio

Rüti, Uzwil
Attendance: 1,600
Referee: (Switzerland) Massimo Busacca (Monte Carasso/Bellinzona)

== Round 4 ==
=== Summary ===
Team 1	Score	Team 2
15 March 1997
FC Altstetten (Zürich)	0–2	Kriens
FC Arlesheim	0–11	Lausanne-Sport
Buochs	1–1 (a.e.t.) (2–3 p)	St. Gallen
SV Lyss	0–3	Fribourg
Rapperswil-Jona	2–3	FC Schaffhausen
FC Wil	3–1	Zürich
CS Chênois	1–2	Étoile-Carouge
Naters	0–2 (a.e.t.)	Yverdon-Sport
Basel	2–1	Young Boys
16 March 1997
Bellinzona	2–3	Winterthur
Gossau	0–4	Grasshopper Club
Lugano	0–3	Luzern
Monthey	4–2	Serrières
FC Riehen	0–2	Sion
Servette	4–0	Xamax
Zug 94	1–4	Aarau

=== Matches ===
5 March 1997

FC Wil	3–1	Zürich
Puce 12' (1:1); Hafner 46' (2:1); Hafner (yellow card) 63'; Python 63' (3:1); Puce (yellow card) 65'	FCZ summary	12' (0:1) Andersen; (yellow card) 33' Nonda

Stadion Bergholz, Wil
Attendance: 1,600
Referee: (Switzerland) Nicolas Daina

15 March 1997
20:00

Basel	2–1	Young Boys
Giallanza (yellow card) 20'; Kondé 26' (1:1); La Placa 46' (2:1); Kondé (yellow card) 70'; Tabakovic (yellow card) 88'; H. Yakin (yellow card) 90'	FCB summary YB summary	(yellow card) 5' Baumann; 21' (0:1) Okolosi; (yellow card) 65' Lengen

St. Jakob Stadium, Basel
Attendance: 11,000
Referee: (Switzerland) Marcel Vollenweider (Rüti, Zürich)

6 March 1997

Gossau	0–4	Grasshopper Club
	RSSSF summary	34' (0:1) Moldovan; 49' (0:2) Moldovan; 67' (0:3) Smiljanic; 82' (0:4) Türkyilmaz

Sportanlage Buechenwald, Gossau

6 March 1997

Servette	4–0	Xamax
Sesa 67' (1:0); Ippoliti 73' (2:0); Sesa 85' (3:0); Karlen 90+1' (4:0)	Servette summary

Charmilles Stadium, Geneva

6 March 1997

Zug 94	1–4	Aarau
Baumann 81' (1:4)	FCA summary	24' (0:1) Ćirić; 73' (0:2) Ćirić; 76' (0:3) Ćirić; 78' (0:4) Saibene

Herti Allmend Stadion, Zug
Attendance: 1,400
Referee: (Switzerland) Massimo Busacca (Monte Carasso/Bellinzona)

== Round 5 ==
=== Summary ===
Team 1	Score	Team 2
29 March 1997
Monthey	2–3	Luzern
FC Schaffhausen	0–0 (a.e.t.) (3–1 p)	Aarau
FC Wil	2–3	Lausanne-Sport
Étoile-Carouge	3–2	Kriens
Basel	1–4	Servette
Sion	2–1	Grasshopper Club
31 March 1997
Fribourg	1–0	Winterthur
Yverdon-Sport	0–1	St. Gallen

=== Matches ===
29 March 1997

FC Schaffhausen	0–0 (a.e.t.)	Aarau
	FCA summary
Penalties
Gerstenmájer (penalty scored); Stübi (penalty missed); Bossi (penalty missed); Meier (penalty scored); Marongi (penalty scored)	3–1	(penalty scored) Roembiak; (penalty missed) Pavličević; (penalty missed) Wiederkehr; (penalty missed) Kilian

Stadion Breite, Schaffhausen
Attendance: 1,693
Referee: (Switzerland) Erwin Fölmli

29 March 1997
20:00
Round of 16

Basel	1–4	Servette
Foda (yellow card) 4'; Schupp 79' (pen. 1:3)	FCB Summary	5' (pen. 0:1) Sesa; (yellow card) 10' Němeček; (yellow card) 17' Margarini; 35' (0:2) Cantaluppi; (yellow card) 45' Juárez; (yellow card) 67' Cantaluppi; 70' (0:3) Karlen; 83' (o.g. 1:4) Schupp

St. Jakob Stadium, Basel
Attendance: 10,000
Referee: (Switzerland) Dieter Schoch (Attiswil)

29 March 1997

Sion	2–1	Grasshopper Club
Meyrieu 20' (1:0); Bertone 90' (2:1)	RSSSF summary	85' (1:1) Yakin

Stade Tourbillon, Sion

== Quarter-finals ==
=== Summary ===
Team 1	Score	Team 2
6 May 1997
FC Schaffhausen	1–0	Servette
Étoile-Carouge	0–6	Luzern
Fribourg	2–1 (a.e.t.)	Lausanne-Sport
FC Sion	5–0	St. Gallen

=== Matches ===
6 May 1997

FC Schaffhausen	1–0	Servette
Nungesser 38' (1:0)	Servette summary

Stadion Breite, Schaffhausen
Attendance: 1,923
Referee: (Switzerland) Andreas Schluchter (Schönenbuch)

6 May 1997

Étoile-Carouge	0–6	Luzern
Mosca (yellow card) 38' (yellow-red card) 57'	RSSSF summary	15' (0:1) Moser; 17' (0:2) Wolf; (yellow card) 55' Sawu; 58' (0:3) Yenai; 64' (0:4) Koilov; 80' (0:5) Moser; 89' (0:6) Brown

Stade de la Fontenette, Carouge
Attendance: 1,112
Referee: (Switzerland) Jürg Herrmann (Hinterkapplen (Wohlen bei Bern))

6 May 1997

Fribourg	2–1	Lausanne-Sport
Brülhart (yellow card) 40'; Jacquet 51' (1:1); Reigoso 108' (pen.); Flammini (yellow card) 120'	RSSSF summary	33' (0:1) Sané

Stade Universitaire Saint-Léonard, Fribourg
Attendance: 5,100
Referee: (Switzerland) Adrian Stalder (Oberburg, Bern)

6 May 1997

FC Sion	5–0	St. Gallen
Lonfat 13' (1:0); Veiga (yellow card) 30'; Lukic 33' (2:0); Milton (yellow card) 41'; Lukic 59' (3:0); Bonvin 64' (4:0); Lukic 67' (5:0)	RSSSF summary	(yellow card) 2' Hellinga; (yellow card) 29' Bühlmann; (yellow card) 30' Mouidi; (yellow card) 47' Brunner; (yellow card) 73' Moura

Stade Tourbillon, Sion
Attendance: 8,500
Referee: (Switzerland) Serge Muhmenthaler (Grenchen)

== Semi-finals ==
=== Summary ===
Team 1	Score	Team 2
19 May 1997
Luzern	2–1	FC Schaffhausen
Sion	5–2	Fribourg

=== Matches ===
19 May 1997

Luzern	2–1	FC Schaffhausen
Wyss (yellow card) 38'; Yenai 46' (1:1); Sawu 90' (2:1)	RSSSF summary	8' (0:1) Engesser; (yellow card) 50' Bossi

Stadion Allmend, Luzern
Attendance: 9,500
Referee: (Switzerland) Kurt Zuppinger (Bremgarten)

19 May 1997

Sion	5–2	Fribourg
Lukic 36' (1:0); Lonfat 39' (2:0); Zambaz 54' (3:1); Ouattara 81' (4:1); Milton 83' (5:1)	RSSSF summary	51' (2:1) Bourquenoud; 86' (5:2) Flammini

Stade Tourbillon, Sion
Attendance: 15,000
Referee: (Switzerland) Werner Müller (Obererlinsbach)

== Final ==
=== Summary ===
Team 1	Score	Team 2
8 June 1997
Sion	3–3 (a.e.t.) (5–4 p)	Luzern

=== Telegram ===
8 June 1997
15:00

Sion	3–3 (a.e.t.)	Luzern
Meyrieu 1'; Gaspoz 28'; Lukić 84' (pen.)	Report	17', 68' (pen.) Wolf; 42' Kögl
Penalties
Lukić (penalty scored); Outtara (penalty scored); Zambaz (penalty scored); Gaspoz (penalty scored); Assis (penalty missed); Quentin (penalty scored)	5–4	(penalty scored) Wolf; (penalty scored) Wyss; (penalty scored) Moser; (penalty scored) Kögl; (penalty missed) Sermeter; (penalty missed) Sawu

Wankdorf, Bern
Attendance: 28,500
Referee: (Switzerland) Claude Détruche (Thônex)

Sion won the cup and this was the club's ninth cup title to this date and their third cup win in succession.

== See also ==
- 1996–97 Nationalliga A
- 1996–97 Nationalliga B
- 1996–97 Swiss 1. Liga

== Sources and references ==
- Switzerland 1996/97 at RSSSF

Preceded by 1995–96	Seasons in Swiss Cup	Succeeded by 1997–98
