= Fabrice Henry =

French footballer (born 1968)

Personal information
- Date of birth: 13 February 1968 (age 58)
- Place of birth: Argenteuil, France
- Position: Midfielder

Youth career
- 1982–1985: Sochaux

Senior career*
Years	Team	Apps	(Gls)
1985–1993	Sochaux		
1993–1994	Marseille		
1994–1995	Nîmes Olympique		
1995	Perpignan Canet		
1995–1996	Toulouse		
1996–1997	CD Toledo	3	(0)
1997–2000	FC Basel	25	(1)
1999–2000	→ Hibernian (loan)	9	(0)
- * Club domestic league appearances and goals

Fabrice Henry (born 13 February 1968) is a French former professional footballer who played as a midfielder for various clubs in France, Spain and Scotland throughout the 1980s and 1990s.

== Career ==
Henry started his professional career at Sochaux in 1985, where he played for eight years, before joining Marseille in 1993. However, he never broke into the first team at Marseille, and left after just one season to join Nîmes. He then went on to play for Perpignan Canet, Toulouse and Toledo between 1995 and 1997, when he joined Swiss side FC Basel.

Henry joined FC Basel's first team for their 1996–97 season under head coach Karl Engel. After playing in six test games Henry played his domestic league debut for his new club in the home game at St. Jakob Stadium on 2 March 1997, when Basel won 1–0 against Zürich. He scored his first goal for the club on 15 November 1997 in the Swiss Cup game against SC Buochs as Basel won 7–2 after extra time. It was the last goal of the game in the 121 st minute.

Henry stayed with the club for two and a half seasons. Between the years 1997 and 1999 he played a total of 47 games for Basel scoring a total of four goals. 25 of these games were in the Nationalliga A, three in the Swiss Cup and 19 were friendly games. He scored one goal in the domestic league, one in the domestic cup and the other two were scored during the test games.

In July 1999 he signed, on loan for one year from Basel, for Scottish Premier League club Hibernian and here he played in nine league games before retiring from his active career in 2000.
