= Yann Poulard =

Swiss footballer (born 1969)

Personal information
- Full name: Yann Poulard
- Date of birth: 17 June 1969 (age 57)
- Place of birth: Morges, Switzerland
- Position: Defender

Senior career*
| Years | Team | Apps | (Gls) |
| 1988–1991 | FC Lausanne-Sport | 4 | (0) |
| 1991–1992 | → ES FC Malley (loan) | 35 | (2) |
| 1992–1995 | FC Lausanne-Sport | 86 | (3) |
| 1995–1996 | SR Delémont | 27 | (3) |
| 1996–1997 | FC Basel | 19 | (0) |
| 1997–1998 | FC Stade Nyonnais | | |
- * Club domestic league appearances and goals

Yann Poulard (born 17 June 1969) is a Swiss former footballer who played in the late 1980s and the 1990s as defender.

== Football career ==
Poulard advanced to FC Lausanne-Sport's first team in the 1988–89 Nationalliga A season. But during three seasons he only made four appearances, so he was loaned out to ES FC Malley, a club one division lower. During this one-year loan period Poulard was a regular starter and as he returned to Lausanne he became regular starter as well. Poulard played for Lausanne another three seasons before moving on to play one season for SR Delémont.

Poulard joined FC Basel's first team for their 1996–97 FC Basel season under head-coach Karl Engel. After playing in two test matches and two games in the UEFA Intertoto Cup Poulard played his domestic league debut for the club in the away game on 10 July 1996 as Basel won 1–0 against Aarau.

During his one season with the club, Poulard played a total of 26 games for Basel without scoring a goal. 19 of these games were in the Nationalliga A, four in the UEFA Intertoto Cup and three were friendly games.

Following his time with Basel, Poulard moved on and signed for FC Stade Nyonnais, who at that time played in the 1st League, the third tier of Swiss football. At the end of the 1997–98 season Poulard won promotion with his new club. They were the Group 1 champions and in the play-offs won 2–1 on aggregate against FC Münsingen and in the next round both games against SV Muttenz. Poulard stayed with Stade Nyonnais for another six months and then retired from professional football.

== Sources ==
- Die ersten 125 Jahre. Publisher: Josef Zindel im Friedrich Reinhardt Verlag, Basel. ISBN 978-3-7245-2305-5
- Verein "Basler Fussballarchiv" Homepage
