= Daniel Salvi =

Swiss footballer (born 1972)

Personal information
- Full name: Daniel Roger Salvi
- Date of birth: 29 January 1972 (age 54)
- Place of birth: Switzerland
- Positions: Defender; midfielder

Youth career
- 1990: Grasshopper Club Zürich

Senior career*
Years	Team	Apps	(Gls)
1990–1994	Grasshopper Club Zürich	4	(1)
1994–1996	FC Wil	67	(3)
1996–1998	FC Basel	29	(0)
- * Club domestic league appearances and goals

Daniel Roger Salvi (born 29 January 1972) is a Swiss former footballer who played in the 1990s. He played mainly in the position as defender or centre back and sometimes as defensive midfielder.

== Football career ==
Salvi played youth football with Grasshopper Club, advancing to their first team in 1990 under head-coach Ottmar Hitzfeld. Salvi played his domestic league debut for his club in the home game at the Hardturm on 3 March 1990 as he was substituted in at half time. He scored his first goal for his club in the same game. It was the first goal of the match as GC won 2–0 against Lugano.

At the end of the 1990–91 Nationalliga A season Grasshopper Club won the Swiss championship. Salvi played in four of the league matches. Salvi stayed with the club for another three seasons, but neither under head-coaches Oldrich Svab nor Leo Beenhakker who followed Hitzfeld in that position did Salvi play another league match for the team. So he moved on to FC Wil, who at that time played in the Nationalliga B, the second tier of Swiss football. Salvi was regular first team starter, playing mainly as centre back.

Salvi joined Basel's first team for their 1996–97 FC Basel season under head-coach Karl Engel. After playing in two test games and two matches in the UI Cup Salvi his domestic league debut for the club in the away game on 10 July 1996 as Basel won 1–0 against Aarau.

For Basel Salvi played mainly as left back beside Samir Tabakovic or Oliver Kreuzer. He stayed with the club for two seasons before he retired from professional football. During this time Salvi played a total of 47 games for Basel without scoring a goal. 29 of these games were in the Nationalliga A, three in the Swiss Cup, four in the Intertoto Cup and 11 were friendly games.

== Sources ==
- Die ersten 125 Jahre. Publisher: Josef Zindel im Friedrich Reinhardt Verlag, Basel. ISBN 978-3-7245-2305-5
- Verein "Basler Fussballarchiv" Homepage
