= Adrian Falub =

Romanian footballer and manager

Personal information
- Date of birth: 8 July 1971 (age 55)
- Place of birth: Dej, Romania
- Height: 1.84 m (6 ft 0 in)
- Position: Defender

Team information
- Current team: Universitatea Cluj (scout)

Youth career
- Unirea Dej

Senior career*
Years	Team	Apps	(Gls)
1988-1989	Unirea Dej	28	(1)
1989–1996	Universitatea Cluj	206	(9)
1996–1997	FC Basel	24	(0)
1997–1998	Universitatea Cluj	32	(4)
1998-1999	Gloria Bistrița	11	(3)
1999–2002	Național București	98	(4)
2002–2006	Digenis Akritas Morphou	78	(0)
Total		477	(21)

Managerial career
- 2006–2007: Universitatea Cluj
- 2008–2009: Sportul Studențesc
- 2009–2010: Unirea Alba Iulia
- 2010: FCM Târgu Mureș
- 2010–2011: Politehnica Iași
- 2012–2013: UTA Arad
- 2014: UTA Arad
- 2014: ASA Târgu Mureș
- 2015: Universitatea Cluj
- 2015: Al Urooba
- 2015–2016: Concordia Chiajna
- 2017: UTA Arad
- 2017–2018: Universitatea Cluj
- 2019: Concordia Chiajna
- 2019–2020: Universitatea Cluj
- 2021: CSM Reșița
- 2021–2022: Academica Clinceni
- 2022–2024: Gloria Bistrița
- 2024–2025: Unirea Dej
- 2026–: Universitatea Cluj (scout)
- * Club domestic league appearances and goals

Adrian Falub (born 8 July 1971) is a Romanian professional football manager and former player, currently scout at Liga I club Universitatea Cluj.

== Playing career ==
Falub started to play football at Unirea Dej in the 4'th Romanian league. In 1989, he was transferred to the Liga I team U Cluj where he played 9 consecutive seasons. In 1996 Adrian Falub was sold to FC Basel because of the financial difficulties of the club.

Falub joined Basel's first team for their 1996–97 season under heas coach Karl Engel. He played his domestic league debut for his new club in the home game in the St. Jakob Stadium on 4 September 1996 as Basel were defeated 2–4 by Lausanne-Sport. Falub did not adapt successfully to the Swiss lifestyle and after only one year, he returned to his beloved team U Cluj. During his short time with the club Falub played a total of 35 games for Basel scoring one goal. 24 of these games were in the Nationalliga A, three in the Swiss Cup and the other eight were friendly games. He scored his only goal during the test games.

In 1998 Falub moved to Gloria Bistriţa and one year later he was transferred to FC Naţional București. The Romanian defender played 4 seasons for FC Naţional București and in 2002 he went abroad, to the Cypriot side Digenis Akritas Morphou.

== Coaching career ==
In 2006 Falub accepted the offer to become coach of U Cluj and left Digenis Akritas Morphou. He managed to promote the team in Liga I, 3 weeks before the final lap of the championship. Unfortunately, Adrian Falub's team had a very bad start in the 2007–2008 season and he was fired after 10 matches without victory. In 2008 Falub signed a contract with the Liga II team, Sportul Studenţesc. In 35 matches played under Falub's command, Sportul achieved 8 victories, 12 draws and 15 losses. He has terminated the contract with the Bucharest team on 17 May 2009. In April 2009 Adrian Falub signed a contract with FC Unirea Alba Iulia, helped the team to promote in Liga I. In the autumn of 2010 Falub joined CSMS Iaşi. In the winter transfer window he brought to the team Bogdan Ghiceanu and Claudiu Tudor amongst others. His contract was terminated in the summer of 2011..On 14 February 2022, Adrian Falub signed a contract with CS Gloria Bistrița-Năsăud with the goal to promote the team to Liga II.

== Honours ==
=== Player ===
Universitatea Cluj

- Divizia B: 1991–92

=== Coach ===
Universitatea Cluj

- Liga II: 2006–07
- Liga III: 2017–18

Unirea Alba Iulia

- Liga II: 2008–09

FCM Târgu Mureș

- Liga II: 2009–10

== Sources ==
- Rotblau: Jahrbuch Saison 2017/2018. Publisher: FC Basel Marketing AG. ISBN 978-3-7245-2189-1
- Die ersten 125 Jahre. Publisher: Josef Zindel im Friedrich Reinhardt Verlag, Basel. ISBN 978-3-7245-2305-5
- Verein "Basler Fussballarchiv" Homepage
