= Cyrill Schmidiger =

Swiss footballer (born 1978)

Personal information
- Full name: Cyrill Schmidiger
- Date of birth: 22 June 1978 (age 48)
- Place of birth: Switzerland
- Height: 1.86 m (6 ft 1 in)
- Position: Midfielder

Senior career*
Years	Team	Apps	(Gls)
1995–1996	SV Muttenz	12	(3)
1996–1998	FC Basel	8	(0)
1998–2000	SV Muttenz	46	(7)
2000–2001	FC Solothurn	21	(1)
2001–2003	FC Concordia Basel	2	(0)
2003–2007	SV Muttenz		
- * Club domestic league appearances and goals

Cyrill Schmidiger (born 22 June 1978) is a Swiss former footballer who played in the 1990s and 2000s. He played mainly in the position as midfielder.

== Football career ==
Schmidiger played his youth football with local amateur club SV Muttenz and advanced to their first team during the summer 1995 and played one season in the 2nd League, the fourth tier of Swiss football.

Schmidiger joined FC Basel's youth system and first team before their 1996–97 FC Basel season, signing a two-year professional contract, under head-coach Karl Engel. He played mainly with the youth or reserve team, but after playing in three test games Schmidiger played his domestic league debut for the club in the home game in the St. Jakob Stadium on 31 May 1997 as Basel won 3–2 against Aarau.

He stayed with the club for one more season, but during this time he was only used as a substitute and therefore he returned to his club of origin. During his time with the club Schmidiger played a total of 16 games for Basel without scoring a goal. Eight of these games were in the Nationalliga A and eight were friendly games.

After playing two more years in the first team with SV Muttenz, who had in the meantime had been promoted to the 1st League, Schmidiger was hired by FC Solothurn, who at that time played in the Nationalliga B. Schmidiger played 21 league games, scoring one goal, for Solothurn. He then transferred to division rivals FC Concordia Basel and played as semi-professional. He played two seasons for Concordia but did not obtain much playing time and so he retired from professional career and again returned to his club of origin, who in the meantime had suffered relegation to the fourth tier. Two years later, at the end of the 2004–05 season, Schmidiger achieved promotion with Muttenz.

He played with their first team at least two more seasons.

== Private life ==
Schmidiger obtained his vocational diploma at the commercial school of business in Liestal in 1997. In 1999 he joined the UBS and worked as customer advisor and became team leader. After his professional football career, he visited a higher technical school for economics for his further education. Since 2014 he is branch manager.

== Sources ==
- Die ersten 125 Jahre. Publisher: Josef Zindel im Friedrich Reinhardt Verlag, Basel. ISBN 978-3-7245-2305-5
- Verein "Basler Fussballarchiv" Homepage
