= Markus Schupp =

German footballer (born 1966)

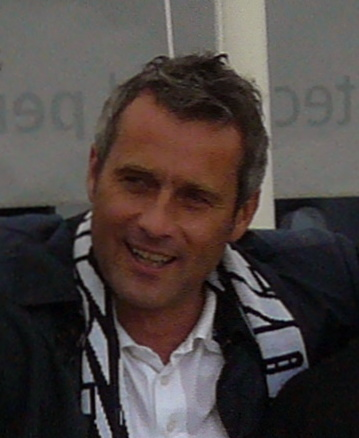
- Schupp in 2012

Personal information
- Date of birth: 7 January 1966 (age 60)
- Place of birth: Idar-Oberstein, West Germany
- Height: 1.80 m (5 ft 11 in)
- Position: Midfielder

Senior career*
Years	Team	Apps	(Gls)
1984–1991	1. FC Kaiserslautern	177	(16)
1991–1992	SG Wattenscheid 09	37	(8)
1992–1995	Bayern Munich	91	(12)
1995–1996	Eintracht Frankfurt	30	(4)
1996–1997	Hamburger SV	16	(0)
1997	→ FC Basel (loan)	6	(0)
1997–2001	Sturm Graz	128	(5)
Total		485	(45)

International career
1985–1987	West Germany U-21	7	(0)

Managerial career
- 2002–2004: Sturm Graz (reserves)
- 2004–2006: Wacker Burghausen
- 2007–2008: Hamburger SV (assistant)
- 2009: Red Bull Salzburg (assistant)
- 2009–2010: Karlsruher SC
- * Club domestic league appearances and goals

Markus Schupp (born 7 January 1966) is a German football manager and former player.

== Club career ==
Born in Idar-Oberstein, Rhineland-Palatinate, Schupp started playing professionally in 1984 at 1. FC Kaiserslautern, where he won the German Cup in 1990 and the league title in 1991. On 21 May 1985 (25th matchday) he scored in the 68th minute of a 5-2 home win over VfL Bochum to make it 4-0, just one minute after coach Manfred Krafft had substituted him for Bruno Hübner. He went on to play over 150 matches for the club over seven years before joining SG Wattenscheid 09 in July 1991. He played at Wattenscheid for just one season, but he was so impressive during that time that it led to him being signed by FC Bayern Munich in the Summer of 1992. At Bayern, he was a first-team regular and helped the club win the 1994 Bundesliga title and two Fuji-Cups, in 1994 and 1995. He then moved to Eintracht Frankfurt in 1995 where he had moderate personal success but won no major honours as he left the club after just one season to play for Hamburger SV. He was by no means a first-team regular at Hamburg and was sent on short loan spell in Switzerland in 1997.

Schupp joined FC Basel's first team for the second half of their 1996–97 FC Basel season under coach Karl Engel. Schupp played his domestic league debut for the club in the home game in the St. Jakob Stadium on 23 March 1997 as Basel were defeated 0–1 by Sion. He scored his first goal for his club on 29 March home game against Servette in the Swiss Cup. Schupp's goal was scored 79th minute from the penalty point. but only a few minutes later Schupp scored an own goal and Basel were defeated 1–4 and so eliminated from the competition. During this time the team suffered six defeats in a row and head-coach Karl Engel was fired and was replaced by Heinz Hermann. The football did not improve and after just a few weeks Hermann was replaced by Salvatore Andracchio. For Schupp this was not a good time either, he played in only seven games for Basel, scoring just that one goal. Six of these games were in the Nationalliga A and one in the Swiss Cup. All seven of these games ended with a defeat.

Later that year, he signed for SK Sturm Graz of Austria and retired in 2001, having played 128 league games for the club and having scored one goal in 20 games. His last appearance was a mark of respect for his club when they finished the group stage ahead of Galatasaray Istanbul, Rangers F.C. and AS Monaco FC to finish in the top 16 sides.

== International career ==
Schupp played twice for the U-18 national team: on 12 April 1983, he was a member of the team that beat China 4-1 in Brand and on 4 May 1983, the team that defeated Switzerland 5-2 in Schaffhausen defeated. On 16 November 1985, the U-21 national team defeated Czechoslovakia 3-1; Schupp made his debut for the U-21s when he was substituted in for Manfred Schwabl in the 75th minute. He played his last game for this selection on 24 March 1987 in a 4–1 home win over Luxembourg.

== Coaching career ==
After his retirement from playing, he managed SV Wacker Burghausen from 2004 until 2006 and was assistant manager to Huub Stevens at Hamburger SV during the 2007–08 season. On 22 April 2009, he signed a contract with FC Red Bull Salzburg as assistant coach and signed then on 3 September 2009 a contract as head coach of Karlsruher SC until 30 June 2011.

== Honours ==
1. FC Kaiserslautern

- Bundesliga: 1990–91
- DFB-Pokal: 1989–90

Bayern Munich

- Bundesliga: 1993–94

== Sources ==
- Rotblau: Jahrbuch Saison 2017/2018. Publisher: FC Basel Marketing AG. ISBN 978-3-7245-2189-1
- Die ersten 125 Jahre. Publisher: Josef Zindel im Friedrich Reinhardt Verlag, Basel. ISBN 978-3-7245-2305-5
- Verein "Basler Fussballarchiv" Homepage
