= Sandro Foda =

German footballer (born 1989)

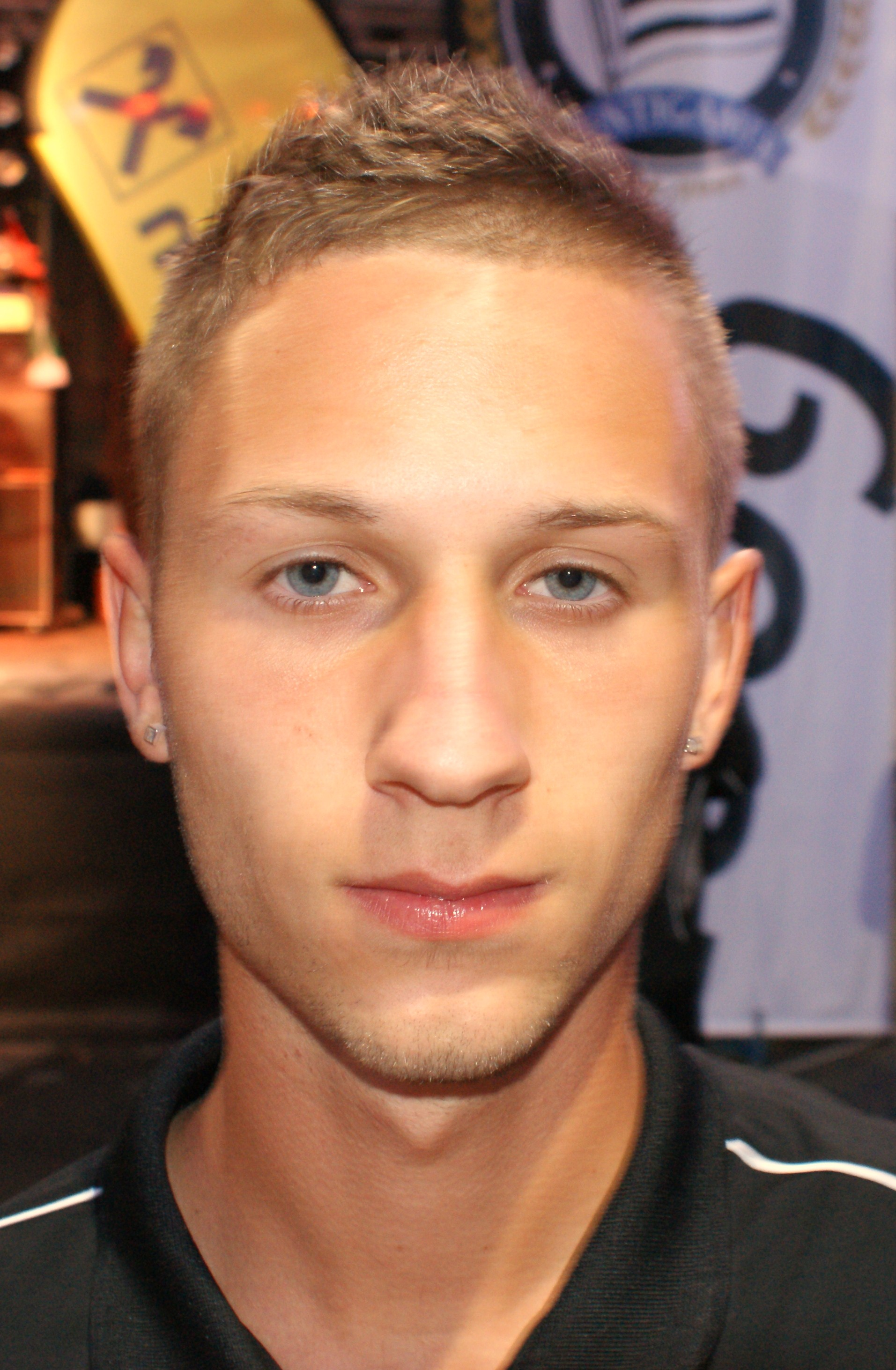
- Foda with Sturm Graz

Personal information
- Date of birth: 28 December 1989 (age 36)
- Place of birth: Mainz, West Germany
- Height: 1.81 m (5 ft 11 in)
- Position: Midfielder

Youth career
- 1997–2007: Sturm Graz

Senior career*
| Years | Team | Apps | (Gls) |
| 2007–2012 | Sturm Graz A | 33 | (2) |
| 2007–2012 | Sturm Graz | 27 | (0) |
| 2012–2013 | TSV Hartberg | 28 | (0) |
| Total | | 88 | (2) |
- * Club domestic league appearances and goals

Sandro Foda (born 28 December 1989) is a German former professional footballer who played as a midfielder.

== Career ==
Foda was born in Mainz, Germany. He played for Sturm Graz and TSV Hartberg.

== Personal life ==
Foda is of Italian descent through his paternal grandfather. His father is former player Franco Foda. He has worked as a youth coach at SV Wildon.
