= Mariano Armentano =

Argentine footballer

Personal information
- Full name: Mariano Andrés Armentano Lepera
- Date of birth: 12 July 1974 (age 52)
- Place of birth: Buenos Aires, Argentina
- Height: 1.82 m (6 ft 0 in)
- Position: Striker

Senior career*
Years	Team	Apps	(Gls)
1991–1994	Vélez Sarsfield	23	(4)
1994–1995	Estudiantes LP	23	(10)
1995–1996	Racing Club	9	(0)
1996–1997	Basel	24	(2)
1997–1998	Vélez Sarsfield	6	(0)
1998	Rosario Central	8	(0)
1998–2000	Elche	72	(19)
2000–2002	Osasuna	49	(8)
2002–2003	Elche	22	(4)
2003–2004	Algeciras	39	(14)
2004	Córdoba	18	(2)
2005–2007	Rayo Vallecano	64	(13)
Total		357	(76)
- * Club domestic league appearances and goals

Mariano Andrés Armentano Lepera (born 12 July 1974) is an Argentine retired footballer who played as a striker.

He also held Italian nationality, although he spent most of his professional career in Spain.

== Club career ==
Armentano was born in Buenos Aires. After beginning in his country with Club Atlético Vélez Sarsfield, Estudiantes de La Plata and Racing Club de Avellaneda, he had a brief stint in Switzerland.

Armentano joined FC Basel's first team for their 1996–97 season under head coach Karl Engel. After playing in one test game Armentano made his debut for his new club in the 1996 UEFA Intertoto Cup match on 22 June 1996. It was the home game in the St. Jakob Stadium as Basel played a two all draw with Shakhtar Donetsk. After playing in three test games and one further UIC match, Armentano played his domestic league debut for the club in the away game in on 10 July as Basel won 1–0 against Aarau. He scored his first league goal for his club on 14 September in the home game in the St. Jakob Stadium in the return match against Aarau as Basel won 2–0. Staying with the club just this one season, Armentano played a total of 38 games for Basel scoring a total of 13 goals. 25 of these games were in the Nationalliga A, one in the Swiss Cup, four in the UIC and 8 were friendly games. He scored 2 goals in the domestic league, one in the cup, one in the UIC and the other 9 were scored during the test games. On two occasions he scored four goals. The first occasion was on 25 June 1996 in the test game against FC Deitingen as Basel won 8–0. The second was the test match on 3 October against SV Muttenz as Basel won 5–1 and he scored the four within 21 minutes in the second half.

After this Armentano returned to Vélez. Armentano then signed with Rosario Central, going on to spend the following eight years in Spain, with Elche CF (two stints), CA Osasuna, Algeciras CF, Córdoba CF and Rayo Vallecano. Only with Osasuna did he play in La Liga, being an attacking backup; he retired in 2007, aged 33.

In 2010, Armentano returned to Vélez, being appointed the club's general manager.
