= Gaetano Giallanza =

Swiss footballer (born 1974)

Personal information
- Date of birth: 6 June 1974 (age 52)
- Place of birth: Dornach, Switzerland
- Position: Striker

Youth career
- Old Boys

Senior career*
Years	Team	Apps	(Gls)
1991–1992	Old Boys	7	(3)
1992–1993	Basel	1	(0)
1993–1994	Servette	10	(1)
1994–1995	Young Boys	33	(16)
1995–1996	Sion	10	(3)
1996–1997	Basel	43	(21)
1998–2000	Nantes	12	(2)
1998	→ Bolton Wanderers (loan)	3	(0)
1998–1999	→ Lugano (loan)	29	(8)
2000	→ Norwich City (loan)	3	(0)
2000–2002	Norwich City	11	(2)
2003–2004	Young Boys	19	(5)
2004–2006	Aarau	57	(19)
2006–2007	Darlington	14	(3)
- * Club domestic league appearances and goals

Gaetano Giallanza (born 6 June 1974) is a Swiss-Italian former professional footballer, who played as a striker. He is now a football agent and represented Timm Klose during his transfer to Giallanza's old club Norwich City.

== Football career ==
Giallanza played youth football with Old Boys and joined OB's first team for their 1991–92 in their Nationalliga B season. The following season he played with Basel U-18 team and had one appearance for their first team in Basel's 1992–93 season, also in the second tier of Swiss football. Giallanza moved on and signed for Servette in the 1993–94 Nationalliga A season. Servette won the championship and Giallanza scored one goal in ten appearances. He again moved on and signed for Young Boys for the 1994–95 Nationalliga A season. YB finished the qualification round bottom of the table and slipped into the relegation round. In the relegation round Giallanza scored nine goals and helped save the team from relegation. With the seven goals from the qualifying round, he was the team's top goal scorer. Giallanza played the following season with Sion, but could not maintain a place in the starting eleven and so moved on again.

Giallanza joined Basel for their 1996–97 season under head coach Karl Engel. After playing in two test games, Giallanza played his team debut for the club in the 1996 Intertoto Cup. This was the away game in the Isparta Atatürk Stadium on 29 June 1996 as Basel won 5–2 against Antalyaspor. He scored his first goal for the club during the same game. He played his domestic league debut with the team in the away game two weeks later on 10 July 1996 as Basel won 1–0 against Aarau. He scored his first league goal for the team on 17 August 1996 in the home game in the St. Jakob Stadium. But it did not help them because Basel were defeated 4–5 by Grasshopper Club. That season Giallanza had 32 appearances in the teams' 36 outings and he scored 17 goals and was the team's top goal scorer. In the following season Giallanza was also regular starter, but at the end of September he transferred to France.

During his one and a half seasons with the club Giallanza played a total of 67 games for Basel scoring a total of 37 goals. 43 of these games were in the Nationalliga A, 2 in the Swiss Cup, 3 in the UIC and 19 were friendly games. He scored 21 goals in the domestic league, 2 in the UIC and the other 14 were scored during the test games.

Giallanza signed for Nantes and played his league debut for them on 26 September 1997 and scored his first goal for them in the same game. But it could not help his team as they were defeated 1–2 by AS Caen. In March 1998 Giallanza was loaned to Bolton Wanderers. In the season 1998–99 Giallanza was loaned out to Lugano on a one-year contract and after this he then returned to Nantes. On 22 March 2000 Giallanza signed for Norwich City, originally on a three-month loan contract. He made a non-scoring debut in the 1–0 victory against Wolverhampton Wanderers on 15 April 2000. Giallanza signed definitively for the Canaries on 4 July 2000. An injury in the home match on 20 October 2000 against Sheffield United forced Giallanza out for the remainder of the season and the entire following year. In May 2002 the Canaries announced that they would not renew his contract as the club was struggling with their funds.

Returning to Switzerland Giallanza played one further season with Young Boys and two seasons with Aarau. Giallanza's last station was in the season 2006–07 as he returned to England and played with lower league Darlington.

== Personal career ==
Giallanza worked two years alongside former professional footballer David Hodgson for BHP sports management and representation. Giallanza has opened his own agency, Giallanza Sport, and now represents a number of players including Fabian Frei, Timm Klose and David von Ballmoos.

== Sources ==
- Die ersten 125 Jahre. Publisher: Josef Zindel im Friedrich Reinhardt Verlag, Basel. ISBN 978-3-7245-2305-5
- Verein "Basler Fussballarchiv" Homepage
