= Mario Frick (footballer) =

Liechtensteiner footballer (born 1974)

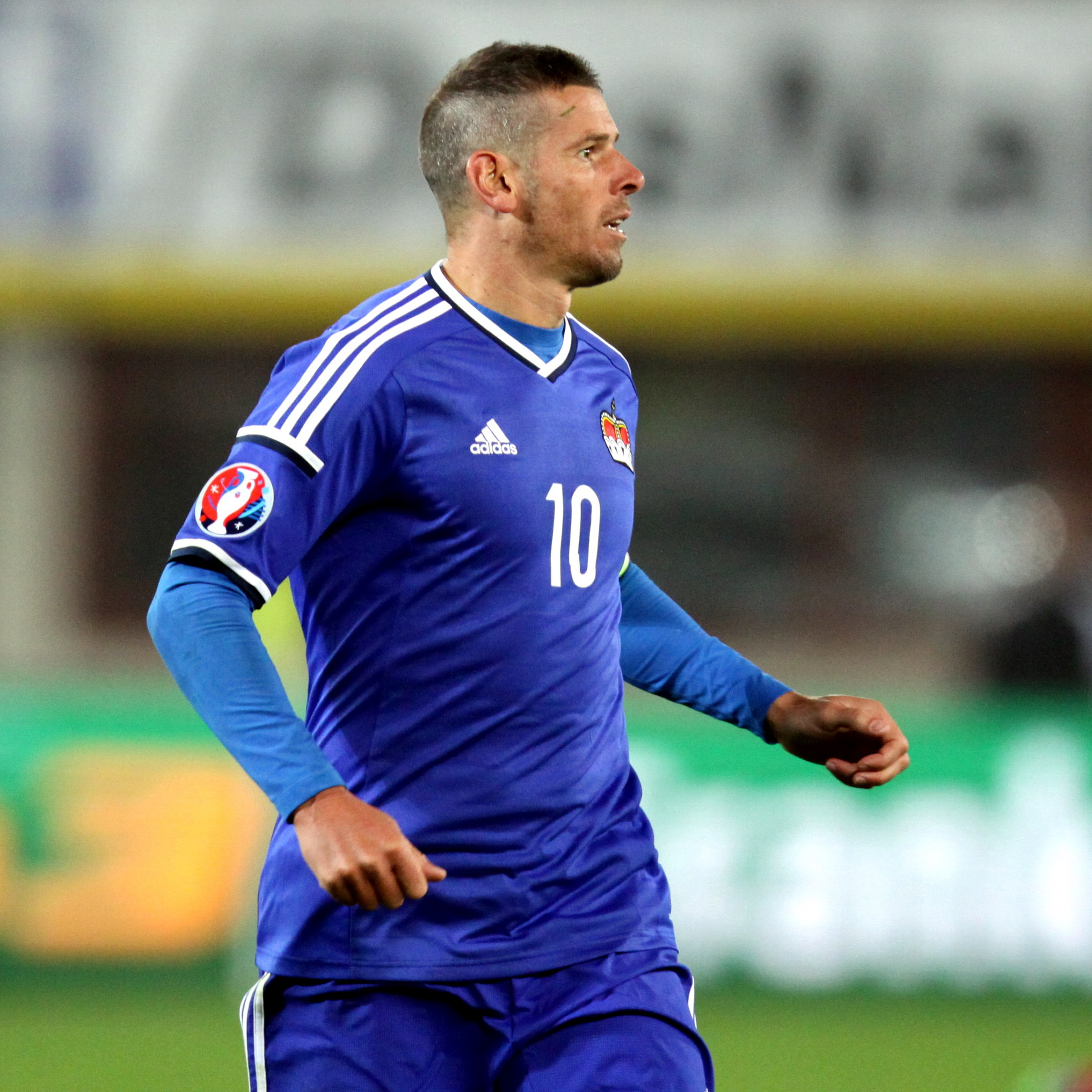
- Frick captaining Liechtenstein in 2015

Personal information
- Date of birth: 7 September 1974 (age 52)
- Place of birth: Chur, Switzerland
- Height: 1.82 m (6 ft 0 in)
- Positions: Forward; defender

Team information
- Current team: Aberdeen (manager)

Youth career
- 1982–1990: Balzers

Senior career*
Years	Team	Apps	(Gls)
1990–1994	Balzers	97	(49)
1994–1996	St. Gallen	60	(11)
1996–1999	Basel	81	(30)
1999–2000	Zürich	41	(7)
2000–2001	Arezzo	23	(18)
2001–2002	Verona	24	(7)
2002–2006	Ternana	133	(44)
2006–2009	Siena	88	(14)
2009–2011	St. Gallen	41	(5)
2011	Grasshopper	8	(1)
2011–2016	Balzers	69	(7)
Total		664	(190)

International career
1993–2015	Liechtenstein	125	(16)

Managerial career
- 2012–2017: Balzers
- 2017–2018: FC Vaduz U18
- 2017–2018: Liechtenstein U18
- 2017–2018: Liechtenstein U19
- 2018–2021: Vaduz
- 2021–2026: Luzern
- 2026–: Aberdeen
- * Club domestic league appearances and goals

Mario Frick (born 7 September 1974) is a Liechtensteiner football manager and former player who is head coach of Scottish Premiership club Aberdeen. He has earned 125 caps and scored a national record 16 goals for his country from his international debut in 1993 until his retirement in 2016. Mainly a striker, Frick was also deployed as a centre-back on occasion.

== Club career ==
=== Early career ===
Born in Chur, Graubünden, Switzerland, Frick started his career with the youth team at Liechtensteiner club FC Balzers, in which he then played four seasons in the first team within the early 1990s.

In 1994, Frick played abroad for the first time, signing with FC St. Gallen. In doing so, Frick became the first ever professional footballer in Liechtenstein history.

Frick joined Basel's first team for their 1996–97 season under head coach Karl Engel. After playing in two test games, Frick played his debut for his new club in the 1996 UEFA Intertoto Cup in the away game against Antalyaspor on 29 June 1996 as Basel won 5–2. Then after playing in another test game, in which he scored a goal against Thun as Basel won 4–0, Frick played his domestic league debut for the club in the away game in the Stadion Brügglifeld on 10 July as Basel won 1–0 against Aarau. He scored his first goal for his club on 27 July in the away game in the Stadion Wankdorf against Young Boys as Basel drew 2–2. The game was later recorded as a 3–0 forfeit victory for FCB because YB used an unqualified player. Frick scored his first recorded domestic league goal for Basel on 11 August in the away game in the Stade Tourbillon as Basel drew 2–2 with Sion.

Between the years 1996 and 1999 Frick played a total of 115 games for Basel scoring a total of 37 goals. 81 of these games were in the Nationalliga A, five in the Swiss Cup, three in the UIC and 26 were friendly games. He scored 30 goals in the domestic league, two in the Cup, one in the UIC and the other four were scored during the test games.

After his spells in the Swiss Super League with FC Basel and then FC Zürich, where he built a successful strike partnership with South Africa striker Shaun Bartlett, Frick began catching the eyes of scouts from some of the best leagues in the world, including the Serie A in neighboring Italy.

=== Italy ===
He signed ahead of the 2000–01 Serie C season for A.C. Arezzo, becoming the first ever Liechtensteiner to play professionally in Italy. On his debut, Frick scored both goals in a 2–1 win against Lucchese. With Arezzo, he scored an impressive 18 goals in 23 matches and became the highest scoring foreigner in the division at the time. Frick's good form helped Arezzo reach the Serie B promotion play-offs but they lost to Livorno 5–1 on aggregate in the semi-finals.

After his debut season with Arezzo, Frick signed a contract with Serie A club Hellas Verona. His first Serie A goal for Hellas came in a 2–2 draw against Parma on 28 October 2001.

Manager Alberto Malesani employed a 3–4–3 attacking formation with Frick being one of the three forwards. He would play alongside other promising youth including Alberto Gilardino, Adrian Mutu, Mauro Camoranesi, Sebastien Frey, Martin Laursen, Massimo Oddo, and Marco Cassetti, all of whom would both go on to have successful careers.

However, after a three-year stay in the Serie A, Verona was relegated at the end of the 2001–02 season. Frick signed with Serie B side Ternana on 25 August 2002. Frick was described at the time as a player with "pace and predatory instincts [that] make him a danger inside the penalty area and he has proved he can score against tough opponents."

On 8 January 2006, Frick extended his contract with Ternana until June 2009. Frick would go on to leave Ternana at the end of the 2005–06 season following their relegation from Serie B. Frick played four seasons with Ternana, amassing a total of 133 league games and scored 44 goals; both were personal records for Frick at a single club.

Frick moved to A.C. Siena in July 2006. He wore the number 7 as one of the club's starting formation, playing in the Serie A once again. Upon the expiry of his contract in May 2009, he left Siena.

=== Later career ===
On 22 June 2009, FC St. Gallen signed the Liechtensteiner forward on a free transfer until June 2010.

Following his spell with St. Gallen, Frick moved onto Grasshoppers in January 2011.

Frick decided to end his professional career and go part-time, returning to his first club FC Balzers in July 2011. Frick retired as a player following the 2015–16 season at the age of 41.

== International career ==
Frick made his Liechtenstein debut in October 1993 in a friendly against Estonia, and established himself almost immediately as a key player for the team. He went on to score his first goal for the national team in a 1998 FIFA World Cup qualification match against Romania in September 1997.

On 7 June 2000, Frick scored a notable goal away to Germany to level the scores at 2–2; however, Germany would score 6 goals in the last 10 minutes of the match to win 8–2.

Frick had a falling out with both the national coach, Ralf Loose, and the Liechtenstein Football Association near the end of the 2002 World Cup qualification stages, and he was left out of the team. This episode is chronicled in Charlie Connelly's book, Stamping Grounds: Liechtenstein's Quest for the World Cup. After changes concerning both the Liechtenstein Football Association and the coach, Frick returned to be part of the squad, which included playing in both games against England.

During a Euro 2008 qualifier against Latvia, Frick netted the only goal of the game which brought Liechtenstein their first win over a side that had qualified for a major tournament.

On 10 August 2011, Frick made a record 100th appearance for Liechtenstein.

Frick announced his retirement from international football in October 2015, at the age of 41, after 125 appearances and 16 goals for the Liechtenstein national side. He made his final international appearance for Liechtenstein in a 3–0 defeat to Austria in a European qualifying match on 12 October 2015.

Frick is the all-time record goal-scorer for Liechtenstein.

== Career statistics ==
=== International ===
Scores and results list Liechtenstein's goal tally first.

Goal	Date	Venue	Opponent	Score	Result	Competition
1	6 September 1997	Sportpark Eschen-Mauren, Eschen, Liechtenstein	Romania	1–7	1–8	1998 FIFA World Cup Qualifying
2	14 October 1998	Rheinpark Stadion, Vaduz, Liechtenstein	Azerbaijan	1–0	2–1	UEFA Euro 2000 Qualifying
3	7 June 2000	Dreisamstadion, Freiburg, Germany	Germany	2–2	2–8	Friendly match
4	21 August 2002	Tórsvøllur, Tórshavn, Faroe Islands	Faroe Islands	1–0	1–3	Friendly match
5	20 August 2003	Rheinpark Stadion, Vaduz, Liechtenstein	San Marino	1–0	2–2	Friendly match
6	13 October 2004	Stade Josy Barthel, Luxembourg City, Luxembourg	Luxembourg	3–0	4–0	2006 FIFA World Cup Qualifying
7	17 November 2004	Rheinpark Stadion, Vaduz, Liechtenstein	Latvia	1–1	1–3	2006 FIFA World Cup Qualifying
8	7 September 2005	Rheinpark Stadion, Vaduz, Liechtenstein	Luxembourg	1–0	3–0	2006 FIFA World Cup Qualifying
9	6 September 2006	Ullevi Stadion, Gothenburg, Sweden	Sweden	1–1	1–3	UEFA Euro 2008 Qualifying
10	6 October 2006	Rheinpark Stadion, Vaduz, Liechtenstein	Austria	1–0	1–2	Friendly match
11	28 March 2007	Rheinpark Stadion, Vaduz, Liechtenstein	Latvia	1–0	1–0	UEFA Euro 2008 Qualifying
12	22 August 2007	Windsor Park, Belfast, Northern Ireland	Northern Ireland	1–3	1–3	UEFA Euro 2008 Qualifying
13	17 October 2007	Rheinpark Stadion, Vaduz, Liechtenstein	Iceland	1–0	3–0	UEFA Euro 2008 Qualifying
14	6 June 2009	Helsinki Olympic Stadium, Helsinki, Finland	Finland	1–0	1–2	2010 FIFA World Cup Qualifying
15	7 September 2010	Hampden Park, Glasgow, Scotland	Scotland	1–0	1–2	UEFA Euro 2012 Qualifying
16	17 November 2010	A. Le Coq Arena, Tallinn, Estonia	Estonia	1–0	1–1	Friendly match

== Managerial career ==
On 17 September 2018, Frick was appointed manager of FC Vaduz. In his first season at the club, Frick led the club to a world record 47th Liechtenstein Football Cup title with a 3–2 win over FC Ruggell on 1 May 2019. In January 2020 his contract was extended until summer 2021.

Frick guided the club back into the Swiss Super League on 10 August 2020 following a second place finish in the 2019–20 Swiss Challenge League and subsequent 5–4 aggregate victory over FC Thun in the relegation play-offs.

On 20 December 2021, he was announced as the new head coach of struggling Super League club FC Luzern.

Frick was named as the Liechtenstein coach of the year in October 2025.

After the 2025-26 season, Luzern decided not to renew Frick's expiring contract. Luzern's U17 manager Jörg Portmann was announced as his replacement on 18 May 2026.

On 15 November Frick was appointed manager of Aberdeen, after the recent sacking of Stephen Robinson

== Personal life ==
Frick's sons, Yanik and Noah, are also professional footballers and both internationals for the Liechtenstein national football team.

In an interview with the Swiss pay-TV sports channel Blue Sport, Frick revealed that during his time at FC Basel in the late 1990s he was heavily addicted to sports gambling and accumulated a lot of debt. This led him to transfer to FC Zürich, in order to start anew. Frick has since beaten this addiction and stated that he is happy it happened to him at such a young age and that he has never relapsed since.

== Honours ==
=== As a player ===
Balzers

- Liechtenstein Football Cup: 1990–91, 1992–93

FC Zürich

- Swiss Cup: 1999–2000

Individual

- Liechtensteiner Footballer of the Year: 1993–94, 1998–99, 2001–02, 2006–07

=== As a manager ===
FC Vaduz

- Liechtenstein Football Cup: 2018–19

Individual

- Swiss Super League Team of the Year: 2022–23

== See also ==
- List of men's footballers with 100 or more international caps
