= Franco Foda =

German footballer (born 1966)

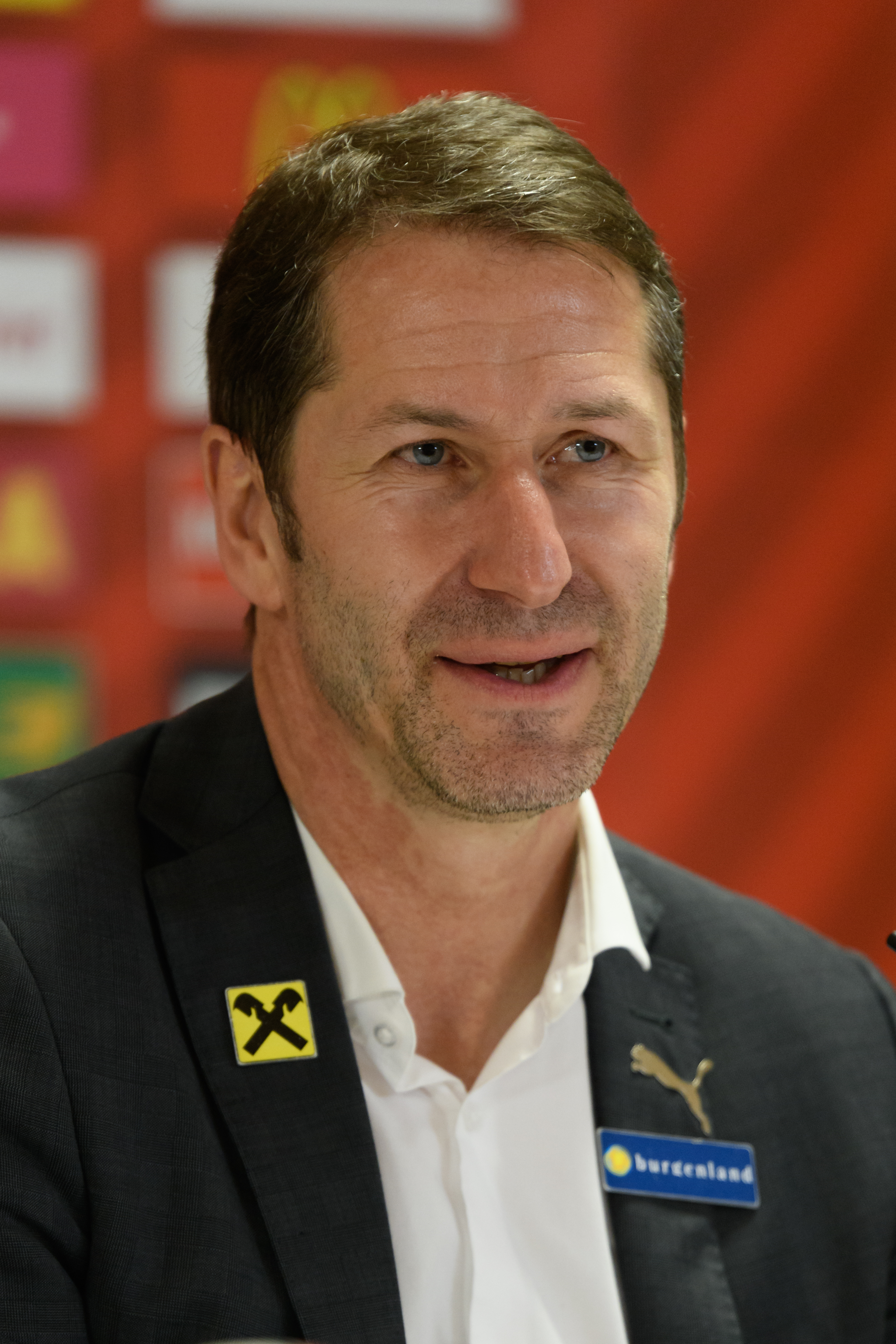
- Foda in 2018

Personal information
- Date of birth: 23 April 1966 (age 60)
- Place of birth: Mainz, West Germany
- Position: Defender

Team information
- Current team: Kosovo (manager)

Youth career
- 1973–1979: SV Weisenau
- 1979–1981: Mainz 05
- 1981–1984: 1. FC Kaiserslautern

Senior career*
Years	Team	Apps	(Gls)
1983–1984	1. FC Kaiserslautern	3	(0)
1984–1985	Arminia Bielefeld	43	(8)
1985–1987	1. FC Saarbrücken	52	(3)
1987–1990	1. FC Kaiserslautern	87	(5)
1990–1994	Bayer Leverkusen	113	(10)
1994–1996	VfB Stuttgart	69	(0)
1997	Basel	13	(0)
1997–2001	Sturm Graz	99	(1)
Total		479	(27)

International career
1985–1987	West Germany U21	7	(1)
1987	West Germany	2	(0)

Managerial career
- 2001–2002: Sturm Graz (amateurs)
- 2002: Sturm Graz (assistant)
- 2002–2003: Sturm Graz
- 2003–2006: Sturm Graz II
- 2006–2012: Sturm Graz
- 2012–2013: 1. FC Kaiserslautern
- 2014–2018: Sturm Graz
- 2018–2022: Austria
- 2022: Zürich
- 2024–: Kosovo
- * Club domestic league appearances and goals

Franco Foda (born 23 April 1966) is a German football manager and former player who is the manager of Kosovo national team.

== Playing career ==
Foda appeared in over 400 top-flight matches in (West) Germany, Switzerland and Austria. During his second spell with 1. FC Kaiserslautern in the 1980s he won two caps with the West Germany national team under coach Franz Beckenbauer; Foda played against Argentina and Brazil in late 1987. During his first ever international appearance, on 12 December 1987 in Brasilia against Brazil, Foda was at the centre of controversy. Both at the reading of the team names and later when he was substituted in, he was met with great applause by the Brazilian fans. Foda only found out the next day that this was due to his name translating to "free intercourse" in Portuguese.

Foda joined FC Basel's first team during the winter break of their 1996–97 season under head coach Karl Engel. Foda played his domestic league debut for his new club in the home game in the St. Jakob Stadium on 2 March 1997 as Basel won 1–0 against Zürich. During his few months with the club, Foda played a total of 15 games for Basel, without scoring a goal. 13 of these games were in the Nationalliga A, one was in the Swiss Cup and the other one was a friendly game.

== Coaching career ==
=== Early career ===
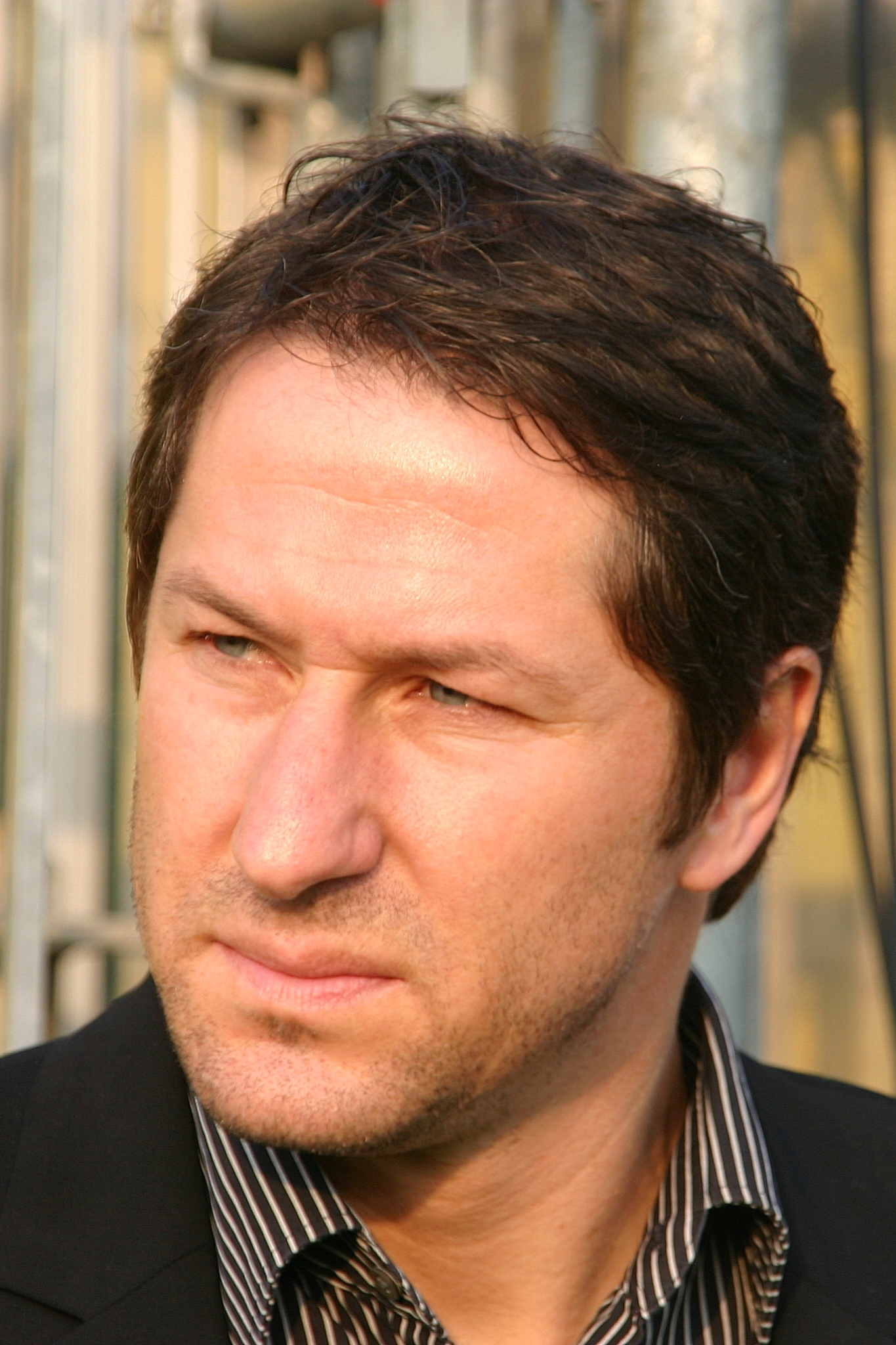
Foda in 2009

Foda moved into coaching with Sturm Graz as an assistant coach. He had been interim head coach between 20 September 2002 until November 2002. At this point, Foda became the permanent head coach until they hired Gilbert Gress to become the head coach on 4 June 2003. He then went on to coach the reserve team immediately after to when he was promoted to head coach of the first team on 1 June 2006. Sturm Graz won the 2010–11 Bundesliga and the 2009–10 Austrian Cup under Foda. He was originally scheduled to leave after the 2011–12 season. However, he ended up being sacked on 12 April 2012 after the club was knocked–out of the Austrian Cup.

=== 1. FC Kaiserslautern ===
On 22 May 2012, Foda was announced as new head coach of 1. FC Kaiserslautern, who had just been relegated to the second division after two seasons in the top flight. On 29 August 2013, he was sacked as head coach with immediate effect.

=== Return to Sturm Graz ===
Foda returned to Sturm Graz on 30 September 2014 and won his first match in–charge on 4 October 2014 against Grödig.

=== Austria national team ===
In October 2017, it was announced that Foda would become manager of the Austria national team, with effect from January 2018. Foda resigned from the position in March 2022, following their failure to qualify for the 2022 FIFA World Cup after the defeat to Wales in Cardiff.

=== FC Zürich ===
On 8 June 2022, he was announced as the new head coach of Swiss champions FC Zürich, replacing André Breitenreiter. Foda was sacked by Zürich on 21 September.

=== Kosovo national team ===
On 17 February 2024, Kosovo appointed Foda after agreeing to a contract until February 2026, this happened after the former coach Primož Gliha decided to resign after weak results in November 2023.

== Personal life ==
Foda is of Italian descent through his father. His son Sandro (born 1989) first appeared professionally with Sturm Graz in 2007, when his father was head coach.

== Managerial statistics ==
As of match played 17 November 2026

Team	From	To	Record					
Team	From	To	G	W	D	L	Win %	Ref.
Sturm Graz	20 September 2002	4 June 2003	33	13	4	16	39.39	
Sturm Graz II	4 June 2003	1 June 2006	93	34	24	35	36.56	
Sturm Graz	1 June 2006	12 April 2012	258	117	65	76	45.35	
1. FC Kaiserslautern	22 May 2012	29 August 2013	44	20	13	11	45.45	
Sturm Graz	30 September 2014	1 January 2018	141	71	28	42	50.35	
Austria	1 January 2018	29 March 2022	47	26	6	15	55.32	
FC Zürich	8 June 2022	21 September 2022	19	5	4	10	26.32	
Kosovo	17 February 2024	present	29	15	5	9	51.72	
Total			663	300	149	214	45.25	

== Honours ==
=== Player ===
1. FC Kaiserslautern

- DFB-Pokal 1989–90

Bayer Leverkusen

- DFB-Pokal: 1992–93

Sturm Graz

- Austrian Football Bundesliga: 1997–98, 1998–99
- Austrian Cup: 1998–99
- Austrian Supercup: 1999

=== Manager ===
Sturm Graz

- Austrian Football Bundesliga: 2010–11
- Austrian Cup: 2009–10
