= Jean-Pierre La Placa =

Swiss footballer (born 1973)

Personal information
- Full name: Jean-Pierre La Placa
- Date of birth: 15 June 1973 (age 53)
- Place of birth: Geneva, Switzerland
- Positions: Midfielder; striker

Youth career
- 1982–1990: Lausanne Sports

Senior career*
Years	Team	Apps	(Gls)
1990–1995	Lausanne Sports	126	(23)
1995–1996	FC Sion	21	(4)
1996–1998	FC Basel	41	(6)
1998	Toulouse FC	1	(0)
1998–2000	FC Aarau	44	(4)
2000–2004	R.A.E.C. Mons	111	(27)
2004	K.V. Red Star Waasland	13	(0)
2004–2005	R.A.E.C. Mons	6	(1)
2005–2006	AC Allianssi	14	(1)
2006–2007	R. Francs Borains	0	(0)
2007–2008	RACS Couillet	0	(0)
2008	URS Centre	1	(0)
2008–2010	SC Paturages	24	(3)

International career
1992–1995	Switzerland U-21		
- * Club domestic league appearances and goals as of 1 July 2010

Jean-Pierre La Placa (born 15 June 1973) is a Swiss former footballer, who played for a number of clubs in Switzerland and Belgium throughout the 1990s and 2000s.

== Career ==
La Placa started his professional career at Lausanne Sports in 1990 and played over 100 games for the club before joining FC Sion in 1995. He spent just one season at Sion and signed for FC Basel in 1996.

La Placa joined Basel's first team for their 1996–97 FC Basel season under coach Karl Engel. After playing in two test games, he played his debut for Basel in the away game in the Isparta Atatürk Stadium in Isparta on 29 June 1996 as the team played against Antalyaspor in the 1996 UEFA Intertoto Cup (UIC). He scored his first goal for his new club in the same game and it was the last goal of the game as Basel won 5–2. After playing in another test game, he played his domestic league debut for the club in the away game in the Stadion Brügglifeld on 10 July as Basel played against Aarau. La Placa scored the only goal of the game as Basel won 1–0.

Between the years 1996 and 1998 La Placa played a total of 59 games for Basel scoring a total of 11 goals. 41 of these games were in the Nationalliga A, 2 in the Swiss Cup, 3 in the UIC and 13 were friendly games. He scored 6 goals in the domestic league, 1 in the cup and 2 in the UIC, the other 2 were scored during the test games.

In 1998, he moved to France's FC Toulouse. He played just one game at Toulouse and returned to Switzerland, later that year, with FC Aarau. In 2000, he signed for Belgian side R.A.E.C. Mons, where he spent the most prolific four years of his career. In 2004, he had an unsuccessful spell at K.V. Red Star Waasland, but he returned to Mons shortly after. His second spell at Mons was much shorter, as he spent only a year at the club this time, mostly on the bench. In 2005, he signed for Finns AC Allianssi but didn't see much first-team football there, either. The club folded after a match-fixing scandal involving Chinese-Belgian businessman Zheyun Ye, and R. Francs Borains acquired his services in 2006, before he headed to RACS Couillet in 2007, and then URS Centre in Summer 2008.

== Sources ==
- Rotblau: Jahrbuch Saison 2017/2018. Publisher: FC Basel Marketing AG. ISBN 978-3-7245-2189-1
- Die ersten 125 Jahre. Publisher: Josef Zindel im Friedrich Reinhardt Verlag, Basel. ISBN 978-3-7245-2305-5
- Verein "Basler Fussballarchiv" Homepage
- http://www.football.ch
