= Alfredo Mosca =

Swiss footballer (born 1971)

Personal information
- Date of birth: 6 December 1971 (age 54)
- Position: Midfielder

Senior career*
| Years | Team | Apps | (Gls) |
| 1988–1998 | Étoile Carouge | | |
- * Club domestic league appearances and goals

Alfredo Mosca (born 6 December 1971) is a Swiss former professional footballer who played as a midfielder.
