= Ricardo Iglesias =

Chilean historian

Ricardo Iglesias is a Chilean historian. He served as director of the Institute of History, Pontifical Catholic University of Valparaíso.
