= Erik Regtop =

Dutch footballer (born 1968)

Personal information
- Full name: Hendrik Jan Regtop
- Date of birth: 16 February 1968 (age 58)
- Place of birth: Schoonebeek, Netherlands
- Position: Forward

Team information
- Current team: Rot-Weiß Rankweil (manager)

Youth career
- SC Oranje

Senior career*
Years	Team	Apps	(Gls)
1985–1990	Ajax	3	(0)
1987–1988	→ Telstar (loan)	14	(13)
1988–1989	→ FC Groningen (loan)	30	(5)
1990–1992	Telstar	43	(20)
1992–1996	SC Heerenveen	99	(26)
1996	Bradford City	8	(1)
1996–1998	St. Gallen	43	(19)
1998–1999	Nice	10	(1)
1999–2000	Austria Lustenau	47	(6)
2000–2002	SC Bregenz	79	(26)
2002–2005	SCR Altach		
2005–2007	FC Altstätten		
2008–2010	FC Montlingen	11	(10)
Total		387	(127)

Managerial career
- 2005–2007: FC Altstätten
- 2007–2010: FC Montlingen
- 2010–2014: SC Brühl
- 2015–2016: Rot-Weiß Rankweil
- * Club domestic league appearances and goals

Hendrik Jan "Erik" Regtop (born 16 February 1968) is a Dutch retired professional footballer who played as a forward. During his playing career, Regtop played professionally in the Netherlands, England, Switzerland, France and Austria, making nearly 400 league appearances in his career. Regtop is active as a football manager, and manages Austrian side Rot-Weiß Rankweil.

== Playing career ==
Regtop was born in Schoonebeek, Drenthe. He played in the Netherlands for Ajax, Telstar, FC Groningen and SC Heerenveen, in England for Bradford City, in Switzerland for FC St. Gallen, FC Altstätten and FC Montlingen, in France for OGC Nice, and in Austria for SC Austria Lustenau, SC Bregenz and SC Rheindorf Altach.

== Coaching career ==
Regtop was appointed player-manager of Swiss club FC Altstätten in 2005. He then moved to current club FC Montlingen, also as a player-manager, in 2007.
