= Vladan Lukić =

Serbian footballer (born 1970)

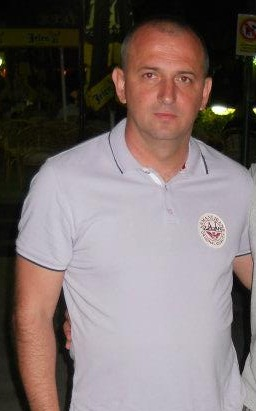
- Lukić in 2012

Personal information
- Date of birth: 16 February 1970 (age 56)
- Place of birth: Sopot, SR Serbia, SFR Yugoslavia
- Height: 1.82 m (6 ft 0 in)
- Position: Striker

Senior career*
Years	Team	Apps	(Gls)
1987–1993	Red Star Belgrade	76	(31)
1993	→ Atlético Madrid (loan)	9	(2)
1993–1994	Vojvodina	11	(3)
1994–1995	Atlético Marbella	19	(11)
1995	OFK Beograd	4	(1)
1996–1997	Sion	29	(15)
1997–1999	Metz	53	(10)
1999–2000	Paniliakos	14	(2)
Total		215	(75)

International career
1991–1998	FR Yugoslavia (Note: Including 4 caps and 2 goals for SFR Yugoslavia.)	6	(2)
Medal record
Representing Yugoslavia
Silver medal – second place	UEFA U-21 Euro	1990
- * Club domestic league appearances and goals

Vladan Lukić (Serbian Cyrillic: Владан Лукић; born 16 February 1970) is a Serbian former professional footballer who played as a striker. At international level, he made appearances for Yugoslavia and FR Yugoslavia.

== Playing career ==
After arrival to Red Star Belgrade from hometown Sopot, Lukić entered first team and immediately showed scoring abilities. He also had a good start with Yugoslavia national team, but his luck turned around in 1991 in a match against Austria, when he broke his leg in a collision with teammate Siniša Mihajlović. Lukić returned to football eventually, but never reached his full potential as a player. He had top performances in the 1996–97 season, when he won the Swiss Football League with FC Sion. The following year, he finished second placed in French Ligue 1 with FC Metz. He left the French club in protest against the NATO bombing of Yugoslavia and returned to his native Sopot where he joined the Yugoslav Army.

== Administrative career ==
After retiring from playing Lukić returned to his hometown and became the chairman of FK Sopot who were competing in the Serbian League Belgrade, which is the third tier of the Serbian football pyramid.

=== Red Star Belgrade president ===
On 26 May 2009, Lukić became president of Red Star Belgrade, replacing previous club president Dan Tana, whilst the club were experiencing major financial difficulties with their account blocked due to reported debt of €23 million. Along with Lukić, another former Red Star player came back to the club in administrative role—Ivan Adžić became the club's new sporting director. From the very beginning Lukić's tenure at the club was accompanied with rumours that Red Star's éminence grise Goran Vesić (also Democratic Party's prominent member and longtime political operative) is the real decision maker within the club.

Lukić's first official order of business was hiring new head coach Vladimir "Pižon" Petrović in early June 2009.

In November 2009, public prosecutor's office demanded for Lukić to be prohibited from performing the function of the president of Red Star Belgrade and fined due to his alleged support to hooligans. In December 2009, at the Serbian SuperLiga winter break, Red Star led the standings with three points ahead of eternal rivals FK Partizan. At the same time, Lukić announced that over his seven months in charge, the club managed to lower its debt by €6 million. Soon after the league restart, Lukić fired head coach Petrović despite Red Star still leading the league by three points, replacing him with club's youth system coach Ratko Dostanić. The coaching change did not produce the desired effect as the club not only failed to add to its lead at the top of the table, but instead lost its points advantage over Partizan. The league title was decided on 8 May at the Eternal Derby with Partizan winning the controversial match 1–0 at JNA Stadium on a long-range goal by Raća Petrović.

During the summer 2010 off-season, Lukić struck a sponsorship deal with Russian oil company Gazprom Neft. The terms of the five-year deal between two parties were not disclosed.

By late November 2011, information appeared in Sportski žurnal sports daily that Red Star's debt again swelled up to €42.6 million, which the club's general secretary Đorđe Stefanović vehemently denied, saying that the club's operational debt is between €25–33 million.

On 13 November 2012, Lukić resigned his post as club president. He was temporarily replaced by the so-called "working group" (also known as 'stabilization commission')—formed on the initiative by deputy prime minister Aleksandar Vučić and headed by Nebojša Čović—whose goal was to determine and assess the club's financial situation as well as to organize the elections for club's new president. In mid-December 2012, Dragan Džajić was elected club president (he was the only candidate after Branko Tekić's bid got rejected) while Čović's working group announced its findings of the club's financial analysis from 1996 until 2012 – pertaining to Lukić's tenure as club president, when he took over in late May 2009 the club debt was reported to be €22,398,806 and reportedly grew to €44,109,565 by November 2012 when Lukić left.

== Honours ==
=== Player ===
Sion

- Swiss Championship: 1996–97
- Swiss Cup: 1996–97

Red Star Belgrade

- European Cup: 1990–91
