= Erol Bekir =

Turkish-Swedish footballer and manager

Personal information
- Full name: Erol Bekirovski
- Date of birth: 25 January 1974 (age 52)
- Place of birth: Sweden, Malmö
- Height: 1.77 m (5 ft 10 in)
- Position: Midfielder

Youth career
- Malmö FF

Senior career*
Years	Team	Apps	(Gls)
–1995	Malmö FF	1	(0)
1995–1999	Young Boys	76	(11)
1999	FC Lugano	8	(1)
2000	Reggiana		
2001–2002	FC Thun		
2003	SV Waldhof Mannheim	3	(1)
2004–2009	IF Limhamn Bunkeflo		

Managerial career
- 2009–2012: IF Limhamn Bunkeflo
- * Club domestic league appearances and goals

Erol Bekir, formerly known as Erol Bekirovski, (born 25 January 1974) is a Turkish-Swedish football manager and former player of Turkish origin with roots from Macedonia.

== Playing career ==
=== Club ===
He started out playing for his hometown club Malmö FF in Sweden but spent most of his career playing abroad for clubs like BSC Young Boys, FC Lugano, Reggiana, FC Thun and SV Waldhof Mannheim.

== Managerial career ==
Upon returning to Sweden he signed with lower division Malmö club IF Limhamn Bunkeflo where he also became player manager before retiring as a player and focusing only on the manager part at the end of 2009. In August 2012, IF Limhamn Bunkeflo and Bekir went their separate ways after the club announced that they could not match Bekirs level of ambition.
