= Gabriel Okolosi =

Nigerian footballer

Personal information
- Date of birth: 8 July 1974 (age 52)
- Place of birth: Nigeria
- Positions: Midfielder; striker

Senior career*
| Years | Team | Apps | (Gls) |
| 1991 | Julius Berger | | |
| 1992–1995 | Africa Sports National | | |
| 1995–1996 | FC Basel | 25 | (2) |
| 1996–1997 | BSC Young Boys | 16 | (4) |
| 1997 | SV Waldhof Mannheim | 16 | (2) |
| 1998 | FC Baden | 7 | (0) |
| 1998–1999 | Espérance Sportive de Tunis | | |
| 1999–2000 | Al Ahli Tripoli | | |

International career
| 1998–1999 | Nigeria | 4 | (1) |
- * Club domestic league appearances and goals

Gabriel Okolosi (born 8 July 1974) is a Nigerian former footballer who played in the 1990s. He played mainly in the position as striker, but also as midfielder.

== Football career ==
Born in Nigeria Okolosi played for Julius Berger F.C and transferred to the Côte d'Ivoire and joined Africa Sports National. He was part of the team that won the Côte d'Ivoire Cup in 1993. He played for Africa Sports for four years before moving to Switzerland.

Okolosi joined FC Basel's first team for their 1995–96 season under head coach Claude Andrey. After playing in one test match Okolosi made his domestic league debut for the club in the home game in the St. Jakob Stadium on 19 July 1995 as Basel won 2–1 against Sion. Okolosi scored his first goal for his club in the home game on 2 August. In fact he scored two goals as Basel won 2–0 against Luzern. Altogether he netted four times, but two of the goals were canceled due to the off-side rule. Head coach used Okolosi in the starting team, often substituting him out. At the end of October Andrey lost his job and was replaced by Karl Engel who changed the team and put Okolosi on the substitutes bench.

This was not to the liking of Okolosi and at the end of the season he moved on. During his time with the club, he played a total of 39 games for Basel scoring a total of five goals. 25 of these games were in the Nationalliga A, four in the Swiss Cup and 10 were friendly games. In all he was substituted out on 13 occasions and in on 19 occasions. He scored two goals in the domestic league, two in the cup and the other was scored during the test games.

In the 1996 offseason Okolosi transferred to BSC Young Boys, but did not get as much playing time as with his former club, so the following summer he moved on again. He played for SV Waldhof Mannheim, where he played the first part on the 1997–98 Regionalliga season. The second half of the season he played for FC Baden in the second tier of Swiss football.

Following these three years in Europe Okolosi moved to Tunisia and joined Espérance Sportive, where he stayed for one season. Then he went on to play for Al-Ahli SC in Libya.

== Career statistics ==
=== International ===
Appearances and goals by national team and year
| National team | Year | Apps | Goals |
|---|---|---|---|
| Nigeria | 1998 | 2 | 0 |
| Nigeria | 1999 | 2 | 1 |
| Total | | 4 | 1 |

Scores and results list Nigeria's goal tally first, score column indicates score after each Okolosi goal.

List of international goals scored by Gabriel Okolosi
| No. | Date | Venue | Opponent | Score | Result | Competition |
|---|---|---|---|---|---|---|
| 1 | 17 August 1999 | Estádio da Machava, Matola, Mozambique | Mozambique | 1–0 | 1–0 | Friendly |

== Sources ==
- Gabriel Okolosi at National-Football-Teams.com
- Gabriel Okolosi at WorldFootball.net
- Die ersten 125 Jahre. Publisher: Josef Zindel im Friedrich Reinhardt Verlag, Basel. ISBN 978-3-7245-2305-5
- Verein "Basler Fussballarchiv" Homepage
