= Oumar Kondé =

Swiss footballer (born 1979)

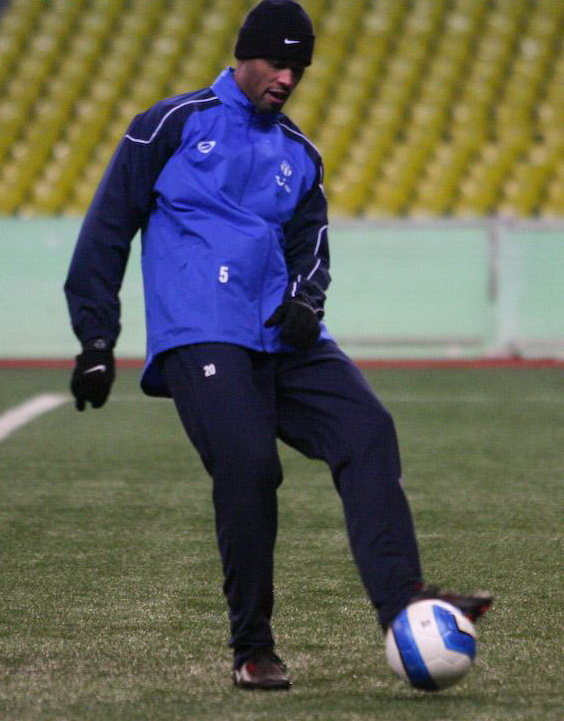
- Kondé in 2007

Personal information
- Date of birth: 19 August 1979 (age 47)
- Place of birth: Binningen, Switzerland
- Height: 1.87 m (6 ft 2 in)
- Position: Centre-back

Youth career
- –1994: SC Binningen
- 1994–1995: Basel

Senior career*
| Years | Team | Apps | (Gls) |
| 1995–1998 | Basel | 58 | (0) |
| 1998–1999 | Blackburn Rovers | 0 | (0) |
| 1999–2005 | SC Freiburg | 115 | (2) |
| 2005–2006 | Hansa Rostock | 2 | (0) |
| 2006 | Hibernian | 14 | (0) |
| 2006–2008 | Panionios | 3 | (0) |
| 2008–2011 | FC Zürich | 18 | (0) |
| 2009 | → Chengdu Blades (loan) | 14 | (0) |
| 2011 | TOT FC | | |
| 2011–2012 | SC Binningen | | |
| 2012–2013 | FC Kreuzlingen | 15 | (1) |
| 2013–2015 | SC Binningen | | |
- * Club domestic league appearances and goals

Oumar Kondé (born 19 August 1979) is a Swiss former professional footballer who played as a defender in the 1990s and 2000s.

== Career ==
=== Youth football and FC Basel ===
Born in Binningen, Switzerland, Kondé started his youth football with career with local club SC Binningen in his native Switzerland. In 1994 he moved to FC Basel and joined their first team during their 1995–96 season signing his first professional contract under head-coach Claude Andrey.

Kondé played his debut for the club in the Swiss Cup game on 10 March 1996. It was an away match and won 2–0 against FC Gossau. Kondé played his domestic league debut for the club in the away game on 14 April as Basel were defeated 3–0 by Grasshopper Club. He scored his first goal in the Swiss Cup on 15 March 1997. It was a home match in the St. Jakob Stadium and Basel won 2–1 against Young Boys.

Between the years 1995 and 1999 Kondé played a total of 90 games for Basel scoring a total of four goals. 58 of these games were in the Nationalliga A, six in the Swiss Cup, one in the UI Cup and 25 were friendly games. He scored that one goal in the domestic cup and the others were scored during the test games.

He played for Basel for three and a half years before he was sold to Premier League club Blackburn Rovers for £500,000. However, he made just one appearance for the club as a substitute, in a 0–0 draw with Newcastle United in the FA Cup.

=== SC Freiburg ===
Kondé had stints in the German Bundesliga with SC Freiburg and Hansa Rostock

=== Later years ===
Kondé next played for Scottish Premier League club Hibernian. He was eventually deemed surplus to requirements at the Edinburgh club by manager John Collins.

After a short trial with the Austrian side Sturm Graz, Kondé signed for Greek club Panionios in January 2007. After a six-month spell in Greece, he returned to his homeland on 28 August 2007 and signed a three-year contract for FC Zürich. He left FC Zürich and signed, on 9 March 2009, with the Chinese club Chengdu Blades a loan deal through 31 December 2009.

Kondé spent some time with TOT FC, then he returned to SC Binningen and spent one year with amateur club FC Kreuzlingen and again returned to his club of origin.

Kondé was capped by the Switzerland national under-21 team.

== Sources ==
- Rotblau: Jahrbuch Saison 2017/2018. Publisher: FC Basel Marketing AG. ISBN 978-3-7245-2189-1
- Die ersten 125 Jahre. Publisher: Josef Zindel im Friedrich Reinhardt Verlag, Basel. ISBN 978-3-7245-2305-5
- Verein "Basler Fussballarchiv" Homepage
