= Karl Engel (Swiss footballer) =

Swiss footballer (born 1952)

Personal information
- Date of birth: 24 November 1952 (age 73)
- Place of birth: Switzerland
- Height: 1.80 m (5 ft 11 in)
- Position: Goalkeeper

Senior career*
Years	Team	Apps	(Gls)
1971–1975	FC Lucerne		
1975–1980	Servette FC		
1980–1986	Neuchâtel Xamax		
1986–1990	FC Lugano		

International career
1978–1985	Switzerland	26	(0)

Managerial career
- 1992–94: FC Lugano
- 1995–97: FC Basel
- 1997–98: FC Lugano
- * Club domestic league appearances and goals

Karl Engel (born 24 November 1952) is a Swiss former footballer who played as a goalkeeper during the 1970s and 1980s.

== Career ==
Engel began playing professionally in 1971 with FC Lucerne, where he continued to play until 1975 when he signed for Servette FC. He saw the most successful years of his career at Servette, winning the League Title in 1979, the Swiss Cup in 1978 and 1979, and the League Cup in 1977, 1979 and 1980. In 1980, he joined Neuchâtel Xamax and he played for the club until 1986 when he moved on to AC Lugano. He retired from playing in 1990.

He was capped 26 times by the Swiss national team, making his debut in a 2–0 win over the United States on 6 September 1978 in Lucerne and playing his last international match on 10 November 1985, in a 1–1 draw with Norway, also in Lucerne.

Engel was appointed manager of FC Basel on 16 November 1995, and led the club to a fifth-place finish in his first season in charge and a solid mid-table finish in the 1996/97 season, but he was sacked after a poor start to the 1997/98 campaign, in which Basel finished second-bottom.

== Honours ==
Servette

- Swiss League Winner: 1

1979

- Swiss Cup Winner: 2

1978, 1979

- Swiss League Cup Winner: 3

1977, 1979, 1980

- Coppa delle Alpi Winner: 3

1975, 1976, 1978

Neuchâtel Xamax

- Swiss Cup Runner-Up: 1

1985
