= 1997–98 FC Basel season =

FC Basel
1997–98 season
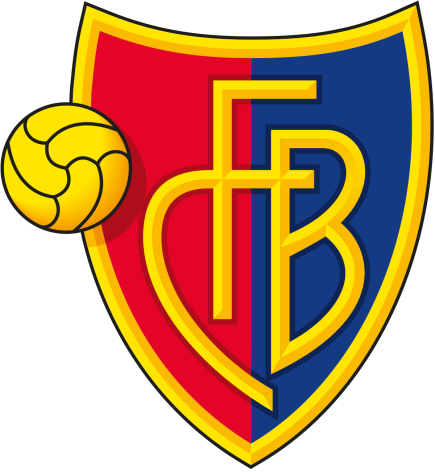
- Chairman: René C. Jäggi
- Manager: Jörg Berger (until October 1997); Salvatore Andracchio (ad interim); Guy Mathez (from 1 January 1998)
- Ground: St. Jakob Stadium, Basel
- 1997–98 NLA Qualification round: 11th of 12
- Promotion/relegation group NLA/NLB: 3rd of 8
- Swiss Cup: Round 6
- Top goalscorer: League: Mario Frick (14); All: Mario Frick (14)
- Highest home attendance: 36,500 vs Solothurn 24.05.1998
- Lowest home attendance: 3,500 vs Xamax 22.11.1997
- Average home league attendance: 10,100

The 1997–98 Fussball Club Basel 1893 season was their 105th season since the club's foundation. Following their promotion in the 1993–94 season this was their fourth consecutive season in the highest tier of Swiss football. René C. Jäggi was the club's chairman following the annual general meeting the year before. FC Basel played their home games in the St. Jakob Stadium, which was situated in the south-east of the city, neighboring the municipalities of Muttenz and Münchenstein. This was to be the last season of this stadium, it was to be knocked down and replaced by the St. Jakob-Park by the beginning of 2001.

== Overview ==
=== Pre-season ===
Jörg Berger was appointed as the new trainer at the start of the season, but in October 1997 he was sacked and was replaced by Salvatore Andracchio (ad interim) until Guy Mathez was appointed as trainer from 1 January 1998. The club's priority aim was to remain in the top flight of Swiss football.

The club made many new signings as the season started. Amongst these, there were many experienced players, such as Oliver Kreuzer from Bayern Munich, Marco Sas from Bradford City, Maurizio Gaudino from Eintracht Frankfurt, Jürgen Hartmann from Hamburger SV and Nestor Subiat from Grasshopper Club. There were also young players such as Marco Pérez from Vaduz, Jan Berger from Grasshopper Club and Fabinho Santos from Joinville (Brazil) as well as Luís Calapes and Alexander Frei from the club's own youth section.

Goalkeeper Thomas Grüter retired from professional football. Many other players also left the club, under them Mariano Armentano who transferred to Vélez Sarsfield, Adrian Falub who returned to Universitatea Cluj and Alex Nyarko who transferred to Karlsruher SC. The loan contracts with Franco Foda and Markus Schupp came to an end and because Basel did not opt to buy them, they both moved on to Sturm Graz. The youngsters Bruno Sutter transferred to Zürich and Hakan Yakin transferred to Grasshopper Club. At the end of the transfer window two further players left the squad, last season's top scorer Gaetano Giallanza transferred to Nantes in September and Jean-Pierre La Placa signed for Toulouse also in September.

In the pre-season friendly games Basel first played against a Regional 11 of local players in Alsace and then against a Regional 11 of local players from BS/BL. Basel then played in the Sempione Cup, which was a club tournament played in summer at Sportanlage Moos, Balsthal, during the years 1987 to 2004. Curiosity, in both Basel games, semi-final and third place match, the decision fell in a penalty shoot-out. The semi-final was undecided after five penalties each and had to be continued. In the end all 22 players including the goalkeepers hat to shoot a penalty. Both goalkeeps missed their penalty-shots and eventually Basel lost the shoot-out 8–9. The third placed match need 14 penalties for the decision and Basel won this shoot-out 5–4. Another curiosity in the mid-season friendly against amateur club FC Rothrist. Basel won the game 13–2. Alexander Frei scored six goals and all six in the first half and Maurizio Gaudino scored five goals, all five in the second half of the game.

=== Domestic league ===
The clubs priority aim for the team was to remain in the top flight of Swiss football and this was to be achieved by reaching the championship group before the winter break. The teams next aim was to reach at least a top five place in the table and perhaps even qualify for the UEFA European competitions. The football league season did not start the way that head-coach Berger had hoped. Four of the first six games ended in a defeat, the team conceding 12 goals and scoring just three. Berger was put under pressure by the club's board of directors, but things did not improve. After six consecutive defeats, a period during which Giallanza and La Placa both left, Berger was sacked. He was replaced ad interim by trainer Salvatore Andracchio, who had helped out the previous season. The team managed to improve their results, but could not correct the slip into the Relegation Group.

During the winter break Guy Mathez was appointed as new head-coach. Soon after this the newly signed Nemtsoudis left the club and Nestor Subiat's loan contract was ended and the contract with Marco Sas was dissolved. Under new trainer Mathez, the first few games were good. But after a period with three away defeats and two home draws, it seemed that the team were heading for relegation. A dramatic finish with three straight victories over the three better placed teams Young Boys, SC Kriens and finally Solothurn saved Basel from the relegation drop. They finished the promotion/relegation group with six wins, four draws and four defeats. They had scored 27 goals and conceded 22.

=== Swiss Cup ===
Basel entered the Swiss Cup with a bye in the third and fourth principal round and started in the fifth. The opponents here were lower tier SC Buochs. Despite an early lead through Dario Zuffi, a penalty and a goal just after half time gave the lower tier a lead. Basel were down 1–2 right up until the 86th minute. Then Nestor Subiat poked the ball into the goal out of the crowd of players who had gathered in the six yard box, the equalizer. In the extra period Basel had no further problems and the Buochs players had no more stamina. Two more Subiat goals, two from Adrian Knup and the final goal from Fabrice Henry was followed by the final whistle.

In the round of 16 Basel's opponents were Xamax, who were stronger and won by two goals to nil. The cup final was played between Lausanne-Sport and St. Gallen, this ended with a two all draw after extra time. Lausanne won the penalty shoot out winning the trophy and qualifying for the 1998–99 UEFA Cup Winners' Cup.

== Players ==
The following is the list of the Basel first team squad. It also includes all players that were in the squad on the day the season started on 5 July 1997 but subsequently left the club after that date. Players who left the squad in the off-season are listed below.

Note: Flags indicate national team as defined under FIFA eligibility rules; some limited exceptions apply. Players may hold more than one non-FIFA nationality.

| No. | Pos. | Nation | Player |
|---|---|---|---|
| 1 | GK | SUI | Stefan Huber |
| 2 | DF | SUI | Massimo Ceccaroni |
| 3 | DF | SUI | Daniel Salvi |
| 3 | DF | SUI | Luís Calapes (from Basel youth) |
| 4 | DF | BIH | Samir Tabakovic (to Waldhof Mannheim) |
| 5 | DF | GER | Oliver Kreuzer (from Bayern Munich) |
| 6 | DF | NED | Marco Sas (from Bradford City) |
| 7 | FW | SUI | Dario Zuffi |
| 8 | MF | LIE | Mario Frick |
| 9 | MF | FRA | Fabrice Henry |
| 10 | MF | GER | Maurizio Gaudino (from Eintracht Frankfurt) |
| 11 | FW | SUI | Gaetano Giallanza (to Nantes) |
| 12 | DF | SUI | Sébastien Barberis (from Servette) |
| 13 | FW | SUI | Adrian Knup |
| 14 | FW | RUS | Daniel Dobrovoljski (from VfB Stuttgart II) |
| 15 | FW | SUI | Deniz Mendi (from FC Klus-Balsthal) |

| No. | Pos. | Nation | Player |
|---|---|---|---|
| 15 | DF | SUI | Ivan Reimann |
| 16 | DF | GER | Jürgen Hartmann (from Hamburger SV) |
| 17 | MF | SUI | Jean-Pierre La Placa (to Toulouse) |
| 17 | MF | CZE | Václav Pěchouček (from Viktoria Plzeň) |
| 18 | GK | SUI | Oliver Stöckli |
| 19 | DF | SUI | Marco Tschopp |
| 20 | DF | SUI | Oumar Kondé |
| 21 | DF | LIE | Marco Pérez (from Vaduz) |
| 22 | MF | BRA | Webber (Leandro Dos Santos) (from Guarani) |
| 23 | DF | CZE | Jan Berger (from Grasshopper Club) |
| 24 | DF | BRA | Fabinho (from Joinville) |
| 24 | DF | SUI | Cyrill Schmidiger |
| 25 | MF | SUI | Theodoros Disseris |
| 27 | FW | SUI | Alexander Frei (from Basel youth) |
| 28 | DF | SUI | Giorgios Nemtsoudis (from Grasshopper Club) |
| 30 | FW | SUI | Nestor Subiat (from Grasshopper Club) |

Players who left the squad

Note: Flags indicate national team as defined under FIFA eligibility rules; some limited exceptions apply. Players may hold more than one non-FIFA nationality.

| No. | Pos. | Nation | Player |
|---|---|---|---|
| — | GK | SUI | Thomas Grüter (retired) |
| — | DF | SUI | Remo Buess (reserves) |
| — | DF | SUI | Yann Poulard (to FC Stade Nyonnais) |
| — | DF | SUI | Yannick Hasler (on loan to Baden) |
| — | MF | ARG | Mariano Armentano (to Vélez Sarsfield) |
| — | MF | ROU | Adrian Falub (to Universitatea Cluj) |

| No. | Pos. | Nation | Player |
|---|---|---|---|
| — | MF | GER | Franco Foda (to Sturm Graz) |
| — | MF | ITA | Marcello Gamberini (to Sansepolcro) |
| — | MF | SUI | Dominic Moser (on loan to Young Boys) |
| — | MF | GHA | Alex Nyarko (to Karlsruher SC) |
| — | MF | GER | Markus Schupp (to Sturm Graz) |
| — | MF | SUI | Bruno Sutter (to Zürich) |
| — | MF | SUI | Hakan Yakin (to Grasshopper Club) |

== Results ==
Legend

Win Draw Loss Postponed

=== Friendly matches ===
==== Pre- and mid-season ====
| 18 June 1997 Pre-season; Exhibition game | Regional 11 Alsace (France) | 0–8 | (Switzerland) Basel | Munster |
| 19:00 | | FCB summary | 16' (0:1) Barberis; 20' (0:2) Knup; 34' (0:3) Zuffi; 36' (0:4) Giallanza; 44' (0:5) Knup; 66' (0:6) Giallanza; 68' (0:7) Tschopp; 83' (0:8) Tschopp | Attendance: 200; Referee: (France) Thierry Keigler |
Note: FCB without Salvi, Henry and Disseris (all injured). 70th minute: Kreuzer was substituted out with a minor facial injury and not replaced.

| 21 June 1997 Pre-season | Basel (Switzerland) | 3–1 | (Switzerland) Regional 11 BS/BL | Tannenbrunn, Sissach |
| 16:30 | Giallanza 23' (1:0); Giallanza 25' (2:0); Gaudino 36' (3:0) | FCB summary | 89' (3:1) Schreiber | Attendance: 1,500; Referee: (Switzerland) Andreas Schluchter / Vroni Schluchter (Schönenbuch) |
Note: From the 46th minute, assistant referee Vroni Schluchter (Schönenbuch) led the game, as Andreas Schluchter went out with a thigh injury.

| 24 June 1997 Sempione-Cup; Semi-final | Basel (Switzerland) | 1–1 (8–9 p) | (Switzerland) Zürich | Moos, Balsthal |
| 19:30 | Frick (yellow card) 27'; Frei 60' (1:0) | FCZ summary FCB summary | 63' (1:1) Sutter; (yellow card) 78' Guzik; (penalty missed) 85′ Tarone | Attendance: 2,000; Referee: (Switzerland) Serge Muhmenthaler (Grenchen) |
| | Penalties |
| | Zuffi (penalty scored); Frei (penalty scored); Hartmann (penalty scored); Giallanza (penalty missed); Gaudino (penalty scored); Tschopp (penalty scored); Barberis (penalty scored); Ceccaroni (penalty scored); Schmidiger (penalty scored); Buess (penalty missed); Huber (penalty missed) | | (penalty scored) Gambino; (penalty scored) Guzik; (penalty scored) Sutter; (penalty missed) Brugnoli; (penalty scored) Santa'Anna; (penalty scored) Tejeda; (penalty scored) Weiler; (penalty scored) Castillo; (penalty scored) Tarone; (penalty missed) Shorunmu; (penalty scored) Konjić |
Note: The Sempione Cup was a club tournament played in the summer at Sportanlage Moos, Balsthal, during the years 1987 to 2004. Corners: 1:10

| 28 June 1997 Sempione-Cup; 3rd place match | Basel (Switzerland) | 1–1 (5–4 p) | (Switzerland) Luzern | Moos, Balsthal |
| 15:30 | Giallanza 27' (1:1) | FCB summary | 11' (0:1) Sawu | Attendance: 2,000; Referee: (Switzerland) Bruno Bachmann |
| | Penalties |
| | Zuffi (penalty missed); Pérez (penalty scored); Kreuzer (penalty missed); Schmidiger (penalty scored); Gaudino (penalty scored); Barberis (penalty scored) | | (penalty scored) Wyss; (penalty missed) Knez; (penalty scored) Moser; (penalty scored) Koilov; (penalty missed) Brega; (penalty missed) Baumann |
Note: The Sempione Cup was a club tournament played in summer at Sportanlage Moos, Balsthal, during the years 1987 to 2004. FCL with test-players Brega and Aklie.

| 5 July 1997 Pre-season | Basel (Switzerland) | 1–0 | (Germany) Borussia Dortmund | St. Jakob Stadium, Basel |
| 20:00 | Knup 13' (1:0) | FCB summary | | Attendance: 14,000; Referee: (Switzerland) Carlo Bertolini (Vira-Gambarogno) |
Note: FCB were without the injured Salvi, Henry, La Placa, Konde, Disseris, and Hasler. Dortmund were without the recovering Möller, Schneider, Cesar, and Sousa. 20th minute, a shot from Herrlich hit the post. Good pitch conditions despite the continuous rain.

| 5 September 1997 Mid-season | SC Dornach (Switzerland) | 1–5 | (Switzerland) Basel | Gigersloch, Dornach |
| | Weidmann 27' (pen. 1:2) | FCB summary | 5' (0:1) Kondé; 7' (0:2) Gaudino; 50' (1:3) Marco Sas; 54' (1:4) Giallanza; 80' (1:5) Dobrovoljski | Attendance: 350; Referee: (Switzerland) Dieter Schoch (Attiswil) |
Note: Dornach without Magro, Donelli, and Sorg (all injured) and without Rudin (absent); FCB without Zuffi (Swiss national team), Frick (Liechtenstein national team), Kreuzer (rested due to Achilles tendon irritation), Huber, Knup, Salvi, Mendi, and Buess (all injured). Fabrice Henry returns after a six-month injury layoff (torn cruciate ligament). 40th minute: Barberi hits the crossbar. 61st minute: Cecere's goal disallowed for handball. 68th minute: Ceccaroni's cross hits the post.

| 19 September 1997 Mid-season | FC Rothrist (Switzerland) | 2–13 | (Switzerland) Basel | Stampfi, Rothrist |
| 18:45 | Berisha 46' (1:7); Roth 88' (2:12) | FCB summary | 7' (0:1) Frei; 9' (0:2) Frei; 14' (pen. 0:3) Gaudino; 21' (0:4) Frei; 23' (0:5) Frei; 40' (0:6) Frei; 42' (0:7) Frei; 48' (1:8) Giallanza; 59' (1:9) Giallanza; 64' (1:10) Giallanza; 75' (1:11) Giallanza; 86' (1:12) Kondé; 90' (2:13) Giallanza | Attendance: 600; Referee: (Switzerland) Marcel Vollenweider (Rüti, Zürich) |
Note: Basel without Henry, Huber (both recovering), Knup, Disseris, Hasler and Ceccaroni (all injured). 80th minute: Frei hits the crossbar. Corners 0:12

==== Winter break ====
| 28 January 1998 Exhibition game | Basel (Switzerland) | 3–0 | (Switzerland) Zürich | Athletics stadium, Basel |
| | (Jean-Copain Nonda) 7' (o.g.); Knup 73' (2:0); Henry 84' (3:0) | FCZ summary FCB summary | | Attendance: 500; Referee: (Switzerland) Heinz Käser |
Note: Zürich without Ike Shorunmu and Shabani Nonda, but with his brother Jean-Copain Nonda as test-player.

| 31 January 1998 Winter break | Sheriff (Moldova) | 1–1 | (Switzerland) Basel |
| | 60' (1:0) | FCB summary | 75' (1:1) Gaudino |

| 4 February 1998 Training camp | APOP Paphos (Cyprus) | 1–5 | (Switzerland) Basel | Pafiako Stadium, Paphos, Cyprus |
| | 83' (1:4) | FCB summary | 16' (0:1) Gaudino; 33' (0:2) Hartmann; 43' (0:3) Kondé; 62' (0:4) Fabinho; 85' (1:5) Knup | Attendance: 800 |

| 6 February 1998 Training camp | Metalurh Donetsk (Ukraine) | 2–0 | (Switzerland) Basel | Pafiako Stadium, Paphos, Cyprus |
| | 33' (pen. 1:0); 90+2' (2:0) | FCB summary | | Attendance: 100 |

| 11 February 1998 Winter break | Basel (Switzerland) | 0–0 | (Russia) Lokomotiv Moscow | Europastadion, Rheinfelden (Baden) |
| 15:00 | | FCB summary | (yellow card) 70' Loskov | Referee: (Germany) Bernhard Zerr (Ottersweier) |

| 14 February 1998 Winter break | Luzern (Switzerland) | 3–0 | (Switzerland) Basel | Unterallmend, Root |
| 14:30 | Ibrahim 24' (1:0) (Webber) 43' (o.g. 2:0); Kögl 79' (3:0) | FCB summary | | Attendance: 800; Referee: (Switzerland) Markus Nobs, (Wohlen) |
Note: FCB without Knup (rested), Gaudino (ill), Sas and Fabinho (both injured). Fair game, No cautions. For FCB after the break, among others: Dobrovoljski as striker for Frick, who moved to the right wing. Konde for Hartmann in midfield, Salvi at left-back.

=== Nationalliga A ===
==== Qualifying Phase ====
| 5 July 1997 Round 1 | Basel | P–P | Aarau | St. Jakob Stadium, Basel |
Note: Match posponed and rescheduled to allow Aarau to play the match in the Intertoto Cup against 1. FC Köln.

| 9 July 1997 Round 2 | Lausanne-Sport | 3–0 | Basel | Olympique de la Pontaise, Lausanne |
| 19:30 | Piffaretti 40' (1:0); N'kufo 43' (2:0); Udovič 87' (3:0) | FCB summary | (yellow card) 32' Barberis; (yellow card) 33' Frick; (yellow card) 69' La Placa | Attendance: 7,100; Referee: (Switzerland) Marcel Vollenweider (Rüti, Zürich) |
Note: Lausanne were without Savovic (who was ill), Ohrel, Hottiger (both injured), Sané and Triki (both with their national teams). FCB without Salvi, Henry, Konde, Disseris and Hasler (all injured). 53rd minute, a header from Thurres hit the crossbar.

| 12 July 1997 Round 3 | Basel | 0–0 | Etoile Carouge | St. Jakob Stadium, Basel |
| 19:30 | Hartmann (yellow card) 27'; Ceccaroni (yellow card) 62'; Knup (yellow card) 75' | FCB summary | (yellow card) 25' Mosca; (yellow card) 78' Duchosal | Attendance: 12,000; Referee: (Switzerland) Dominique Tavel (Lonay) |
Note: FCB without Henry, Kondé, Salvi, Disseris, and Hasler (all injured), as well as La Placa (not in the squad). Carouge were without Negri, Bertone, Escofet, and Giuntini (all injured). 73rd minute: a shot from Gaudino landed on the top of the crossbar.

| 19 July 1997 Round 4 | Basel | 1–3 | Servette | St. Jakob Stadium, Basel |
| 19:30 | Gaudino 57' (pen.); Zuffi (yellow card) 70'; Ceccaroni (red card) 76' | FCB summary | (yellow card) 14' Barea; 34' (0:1) Cantaluppi; (yellow card) 45' Samuele MargariniMargarini; 55' (0:2) (yellow card) 23'Sesa; 77' (pen.) Durix | Attendance: 9,500; Referee: (Switzerland) Philippe Leuba (Chexbres) |
Note: FCB without Salvi, Henry, Kondé, Disseris, and Hasler (all injured) and La Placa was not in the squad. Servette were without Karlen, Costantino, Nava, and Jenny (all injured). Barea and Juarez had to leave the game injured. National coach Rolf Fringer and Borussia Dortmund's sporting director Ottmar Hitzfeld were in the stands.

| 26 July 1997 Round 5 | Zürich | 0–0 | Basel | Letzigrund, Zürich |
| 19:30 | Tarone (yellow card) 59'; Tejeda (yellow card) 70'; Yekini (yellow card) 89' | FCZ summary FCB summary | (yellow card) 17' Zuffi | Attendance: 15,500; Referee: (Liechtenstein) Roland Beck (Triesenberg) |
Note: FCZ without Huber and Weiler (both injured). FCB without Ceccaroni (suspended), Barberis, Disseris, Hasler, Henry and Konde (all injured). 25th minute: a goal from Nondas was disallowed. 50th minute: Shorunmu deflects a shot from Sas onto the goal-post.

| 2 August 1997 Round 6 | Basel | 1–3 | Sion | St. Jakob Stadium, Basel |
| 19:30 | Sas (yellow card) 23'; Giallanza 41' (1:1); Hartmann (yellow card) 61' | FCB summary | 3' (0:1) Camadini; 64' (1:2) Camadini; (yellow card) 68' Zambaz; 80' (1:3) Tholot | Attendance: 12,000; Referee: (Switzerland) Carlo Bertolini (Vira-Gambarogno) |
Note: FCB without Knup, Tabakovic, Konde, Disseris, Hasler, and Henry (all injured); Sion without Gaspoz, Biaggi, Chassot, Veiga, Sylvestre, Assis, and Vanetta (all injured). National coach Rolf Fringer and former FCB coach Claude Andrey in the stands. 36th minute: a shot from Hartmann hits the crossbar. Tactical change Gaudino reverts to playing behind the strikers after a quarter of an hour, with Frick in attack; La Placa, after coming on as a substitute (62nd minute), moves into attack, with Frick replacing Salvi in left midfield; FCB played without a libero after Sas' substitution (79th minute).

| 10 August 1997 Round 7 | Kriens | 3–1 | Basel | Stadion Kleinfeld, Kriens |
| 16:00 | Esposito 7' (1:0); Gross (yellow card) 74'; Schwizer 63' (2:0); Erni 73' (3:0) | FCB summary | (yellow card) 43' Frick; (yellow card) 57' (yellow-red card) 70' La Placa; 76' (3:1) Giallanza; (yellow card) 84' Salvi | Attendance: 4,100; Referee: (Switzerland) Kurt Zuppinger (Bremgarten, Aargau) |
Note: SC Kriens without Schnarwiler (injured); FCB without Ceccaroni (ill), Knup, Konde, Hasler, Henry and Disseris (all injured). 90th minute, a shot from Giallanza hit the post.

| 15 August 1997 Round 1 | Basel | 2–1 | Aarau | St. Jakob Stadium, Basel |
| 19:30 | Ceccaroni (yellow card) 14'; Gaudino 21' (1:0); Giallanza 31' (2:0); Frick (yellow card) 67'; Kreuzer (yellow card) 87' | FCB summary FCA summary | (yellow card) 19' Aloisi; 61' (2:1) Drakopulos; (yellow card) 65' Zdrilic; (yellow card) 70' de Napoli; (yellow card) 78' Kilian | Attendance: 9,500; Referee: (Switzerland) Guido Wildhaber (Kerzers) |
Note: This match was rescheduled after its postponement from 5 July due to FC Aarau's participation in the Intertoto Cup. Basel without La Placa, Tschopp (both suspended), Henry, Knup, Konde, Disseris and Hasler (all injured); Aarau without Roembiak (suspended), Heldmann, Kirik and Benito (all injured).

| 23 August 1997 Round 8 | Basel | 3–2 | St. Gallen | St. Jakob Stadium, Basel |
| 19:30 | Zuffi 23' (1:0); Dobrovoljski 77' (2:2); Frick 82' (3:2); Kreuzer (yellow card) 87'; Salvi (yellow card) 88' | FCB summary | (yellow card) 4' Hellinga; (yellow card) 18' Stiel; 35' (1:1) Vurens; 42' (1:2) Regtop; (yellow card) 61' Slavchev; (yellow card) 87' Herrera | Attendance: 12,000; Referee: (Switzerland) Claude Detruche (Thônex) |
Note: FCB without Knup, Henry, Disseris, Hasler (all injured). St. Gallen without Mouidi and Sène (both injured). 10th minute: a corner-kick from Contini rebounded off the post. Basel goalkeeper Huber substituted out with a torn ligament, Ceccaroni substituted out with a back contusion.

| 30 August 1997 Round 9 | Xamax | 3–0 | Basel | Stade de la Maladière (1924), Neuchâtel |
| 19:30 | Martin (yellow card) 57'; Leśniak 65' (1:0); Sandjak (penalty missed) 78′ Martinović 83' (2:0); Kunz 90' (3:0) | FCB summary | (yellow card) 66' Kreuzer; (yellow card) 77' Ceccaroni | Attendance: 8,100; Referee: (Switzerland) Carlo Bertolini (Vira-Gambarogno) |
Note: Neuchâtel Xamax were without Jeanneret and Rueda (both injured). FCB without Zuffi (suspended), Huber, Tabakovic, Henry, Knup, Disseris, and Hasler (all injured). 78th minute: the penalty kisk from Sandjak rebounded from the post. 89th minute: a shot from Gaudino hit the post.

| 2 September 1997 Round 10 | Basel | 3–4 | Luzern | St. Jakob Stadium, Basel |
| 19:30 | Frick 20' (1:0); Gaudino (yellow card) 28'; Frick 71' (2:1); Giallanza 74' (3:1) | FCB summary | (yellow card) 4' van Eck; (yellow card) 24' Joller; (yellow card) 43' Brunner; 58' (1:1) Aleksandrov; (yellow card) 67' Izzo; 82' (3:2) Kögl; 87' (3:3) Aleksandrov; 89' (3:4) Ibrahim | Attendance: 10,000; Referee: (Switzerland) Kurt Zuppinger (Bremgarten, Aargau) |
Note: FCB without Huber, Salvi, Tabakovic, Henry, Knup, Mendi, Disseris, and Hasler (all injured). FCL without Gmür, D. Wyss, Brown, Sermeter, Yenay, Achermann, and Braga (all injured). Basel's Reimann was substituted out at halftime with heart problems and taken to hospital. After the break, FCB played a 3-5-2 formation with Schmidiger as libero and Frick and Giallanza as strikers.

| 13 September 1997 Round 11 | Grasshopper Club | 3–2 | Basel | Hardturm, Zürich |
| 19:30 | Subiat 6'; Esposito 13'; Gren (yellow card) 48'; Kavelashvili (yellow card) 78' (goal) 78' | FCB summary | (yellow card) 13' Ceccaroni; 15' Barberis; 61' Gaudino; (yellow card) 69' Giallanza; (yellow card) 90+1' Frick | Attendance: 9,150; Referee: (Switzerland) Jürg Herrmann (Hinterkapplen (Wohlen bei Bern)) |
Note: GC without Moldovan, Comisetti, and Gämperle (all injured). FCB without Zuffi (suspended), Knup, La Placa, Huber, Henry, and Salvi (all injured). Representatives from Tyrol and Croatia Zagreb in the stands.

| 24 September 1997 Round 12 | Aarau | 1–0 | Basel | Stadion Brügglifeld, Aarau |
| 19:30 | Roembiak (yellow card) 32'; Kilian (yellow card) 68'; Ćirić 75' | FCB summary FCA summary | (yellow card) 64' Kreuzer | Attendance: 5,600; Referee: (Switzerland) Dieter Schoch (Attiswil) |
Note: FCA without Bader, Heldmann (both injured) and Zitola (suspended). FCB without Knup, Henry, Salvi, Hasler, Disseris (all injured), Frick and Ceccaroni (both suspended). After the break Hartmann right-back, Gaudino for Frei in the attack. In the stands Thomas Bickel and national coach Rolf Fringer.

| 28 September 1997 Round 13 | Basel | 0–1 | Lausanne-Sport | St. Jakob Stadium, Basel |
| 14:30 | | FCB summary | 27' Rehn; (yellow card) 31' Thurre; (yellow card) 38' Ohrel; (yellow card) 64' Piffaretti | Attendance: 7,500; Referee: (Switzerland) Massimo Busacca (Monte Carasso/Bellinzona) |
Note: Basel without Kreuzer (suspended) as well as Salvi, Knup, Hasler and Disseris (all injured). Fabrice Henry returns after a six-month injury layoff (torn cruciate ligament). Lausanne with full squad. 3rd minute a shot from Subiat hit the crossbar. 21st minute: Lausanne goalkeeper Martin Brunner leaves the field injured.

| 5 October 1997 Round 14 | Etoile Carouge | 2–1 | Basel | Stade de la Fontenette, Carouge |
| 16:00 | Aguilar 67'; Hertig 81' (pen.) | FCB summary | 45' Subiat; (yellow card) 46' Orlando; (yellow card) 51' Barberis; (yellow card) 55' Ceccaroni; (yellow card) 81' Huber | Attendance: 1,775; Referee: (Switzerland) Marcel Vollenweider (Rüti, Zürich) |
Note: Carouge without Cravero, Bertone, Giuntini, Nourou, Negri (all injured) and Millereau (suspended); FCB without Salvi, Knup, Buess, Schmidiger, Disseris and Hasler (all injured).

| 19 October 1997 Round 15 | Basel | 3–3 | Zürich | St. Jakob Stadium, Basel |
| 14:30 | Kreuzer 11'; Hartmann (yellow card) 30'; Zuffi 44'; Subiat 88' | FCZ summary FCB summary | 29' Nonda; 73' Tarone; 90' (yellow card) 47' Hodel | Attendance: 9,500; Referee: (Switzerland) Urs Meier (Wettingen and Würenlos) |
Note: FCB without Huber (calf strain), Knup, Salvi, Hasler, and Disseris (all injured). FCZ without Brugnoli (suspended), Baldassarri, Castillo, and Weiler (all injured). Yekini (thigh) and Sas (back) left the field injured. A very good refereeing trio.

| 26 October 1997 Round 16 | Servette | 4–1 | Basel | Charmilles Stadium, Geneva |
| 14:30 | Rey 13' (1:0); Durix 25' (2:0); Potocianu (yellow card) 61'; Sesa 85' (3:1); Durix 89' (4:1) | FCB summary | (yellow card) 71' Reimann; 75' (2:1) Frei; (yellow card) 77' Frick | Attendance: 3,500; Referee: (Liechtenstein) Roland Beck (Triesenberg) |
Note: Servette were without Karlen, Ippoliti, Tato, Salou (all injured) and Juarez (suspended). FCB without Knup, Salvi, Buess, Subiat (all injured) and Hartmann (suspended). Shots on the post: 4th minute, Cantaluppi; 68th minute, Barberis; 87th minute, free kick from Sesa hit the crossbar. As conseqence to this defeat (the seventh defeat in the last eight games) FCB club president René C. Jäggi dismissed head-coach Jörg Berger.

| 2 November 1997 Round 17 | Sion | 2–2 | Basel | Stade Tourbillon, Sion |
| 14:30 | Seoane 9'; Milton 73' | FCB summary | 15' Frick; 19' Barberis; (yellow card) 41' Kreuzer; (yellow card) 87' Ceccaroni | Attendance: 9,500; Referee: (Switzerland) Serge Muhmenthaler (Grenchen) |
Note: Sion were without Gaspoz, Assis, Chassot, Quennoz, Eydelie, and Sylvestre (all injured). FCB without Sas, Gaudino, Buess, Disseris, and Hasler (all injured). 46th minute (first half) shot from Subiat hit the post. FCB with ad-interim coach Salvatore Andracchio on the side line.

| 8 November 1997 Round 18 | Basel | 4–1 | Kriens | St. Jakob Stadium, Basel |
| 17:30 | Frick (yellow card) 10'; Mendi 11' (1:0); Mendi 29' (2:0); Kreuzer (yellow card) 30'; Frick 59' (3:0); Subiat 61' (4:0) | FCB summary | (yellow card) 17' Schnüriger; (yellow card) 48' Colatrella; 78' Melina | Attendance: 4,500; Referee: (Germany) Michael Herrmann |
Note: FCB without Zuffi, Gaudino and Disseris (both injured) as well as La Placa and Sas (not in the squad). Jan Berger's debut. Kriens without Bonnafous and Stoop (suspended) and Pascale (injured). A minute's silence for the late Bruno Michaud. This week-end saw a number of Swiss referees in the German leagues and a number of German referees performing in Switzerland.

| 19 November 1997 Round 19 | St. Gallen | 3–1 | Basel | Espenmoos, St. Gallen |
| 19:30 | Slavchev 10' (1:0); Regtop 20' (2:0); Dal Santo (yellow card) 60'; Vurens 67' (3:0) | FCB summary | (yellow card) 21' Kreuzer; 79' (3:1) Barberis | Attendance: 8,500; Referee: (Switzerland) Claude Detruche (Thônex) |
Note: St. Gallen were without Mouidi (injured) and Tsawa (suspended). FCB without Gaudino, Sas, La Placa (not in the squad), Mendi, Konde (both U-18 national team), Buess and Disseris (both injured).

| 22 November 1997 Round 20 | Basel | 1–4 | Xamax | St. Jakob Stadium, Basel |
| 17:30 | Henry (yellow card) 60'; Dobrovoljski 64' (1:4); Pérez (yellow card) 84' | FCB summary | 26' (0:1) Gazic; 32' (0:2) Jeanneret; 39' (0:3) Hamann; 45' (0:4) Kunz | Attendance: 3,500; Referee: (Switzerland) Massimo Busacca (Monte Carasso/Bellinzona) |
Note: FCB without Ceccaroni (calf contusion), Subiat (thigh strain), and Disseris (injured), as well as Konde, Mendi (both U-18 national team), and Gaudino (not in the squad). Xamax were without Rueda, Sandjak, Martinovic, Moret, Delay, and Boughanem (all injured), and Friedli (U18 national team). - 66th minute: Dobrovoljski hits the post.

| 30 November 1997 Round 21 | Basel | 1–0 | Grasshopper Club | St. Jakob Stadium, Basel |
| 14:30 | Frick (yellow card) 22'; Subiat 56' (1:0) | FCB summary | (yellow card) 18' Gämperle; (yellow card) 63' Haas; (yellow card) 90+1' Tikva | Attendance: 6,000; Referee: (Switzerland) Serge Muhmenthaler (Grenchen) |
Note: FCB without Sas and Ceccaroni (both injured). GC without Comisetti (injured), Gren, Smiljanic, and Esposito (all suspended). Barberis (strain) and Frick (shin injury) left the game injured. Referee Serge Muhmenthaler was honored before his last match before his retirement in Basel.

| 7 December 1997 Round 22 | Luzern | 0–1 | Basel | Stadion Allmend Luzern |
| 14:30 | Sawu (penalty missed) 30′ Fink (yellow card) 73' | FCB summary | (yellow card) 7' Hartmann; (yellow card) 21' Kondé; 47' (pen.) | Attendance: 9,050; Referee: (Switzerland) Philippe Leuba (Chexbres) |
Note: FCL without Kögl, Lehmann, Koilov, Yenay, Baumann, Daniel Wyss, Brown (all injured), Gmür (recovering) and van Eck (suspended); Basel without Subiat, Knup, Nemtsoudis, Ceccaroni, Barberis, Sas and Schmidiger (all injured). NLA debut of Louis Crayton (20/Liberia) in the FCL goal. 21st minute: a shot from Sawu hits the crossbar. 30th minute: FCB goalkeeper saved the penalty kick from Agent Sawu.

==== Qualification table ====
| Pos | Team | Pld | W | D | L | GF | GA | GD | Pts | Qualification |
|---|---|---|---|---|---|---|---|---|---|---|
| 1 | Grasshopper Club | 22 | 14 | 4 | 4 | 59 | 23 | +36 | 46 | Advance to championship round halved points (rounded up) as bonus |
| 2 | Lausanne-Sport | 22 | 12 | 6 | 4 | 45 | 27 | +18 | 42 | Advance to championship round halved points (rounded up) as bonus |
| 3 | Servette | 22 | 11 | 6 | 5 | 45 | 33 | +12 | 39 | Advance to championship round halved points (rounded up) as bonus |
| 4 | Aarau | 22 | 10 | 5 | 7 | 38 | 31 | +7 | 35 | Advance to championship round halved points (rounded up) as bonus |
| 5 | St. Gallen | 22 | 7 | 9 | 6 | 38 | 34 | +4 | 30 | Advance to championship round halved points (rounded up) as bonus |
| 6 | Zürich | 22 | 7 | 9 | 6 | 31 | 28 | +3 | 30 | Advance to championship round halved points (rounded up) as bonus |
| 7 | Sion | 22 | 7 | 9 | 6 | 30 | 27 | +3 | 30 | Advance to championship round halved points (rounded up) as bonus |
| 8 | Luzern | 22 | 7 | 8 | 7 | 26 | 28 | −2 | 29 | Advance to championship round halved points (rounded up) as bonus |
| 9 | Xamax | 22 | 7 | 5 | 10 | 37 | 39 | −2 | 26 | Continue to promotion/relegation round |
| 10 | Kriens | 22 | 5 | 7 | 10 | 23 | 41 | −18 | 22 | Continue to promotion/relegation round |
| 11 | Basel | 22 | 5 | 4 | 13 | 28 | 46 | −18 | 19 | Continue to promotion/relegation round |
| 12 | Étoile Carouge | 22 | 1 | 6 | 15 | 20 | 63 | −43 | 9 | Continue to promotion/relegation round |

Source: rsssf.com
Rules for classification: 1) Points; 2) Goal difference; 3) Goals scored; 4) Head-to-head points; 5) Away goals scored; 6) Draw.

==== Promotion/relegation group ====
| 1 March 1998 Round 1 | Solothurn | 2–3 | Basel | Stadion FC Solothurn, Solothurn |
| 14:30 | Plaschy (yellow card) 1'; Fluri (yellow card) 64'; Edward 75' (1:3); Bürgisser (yellow card) 79'; Fluri 81' (2:3); Edward (yellow card) 83' | FCB summary | (yellow card) 12' Gaudino; 20' (0:1) Gaudino; 71' (0:2) Berger; 74' (0:3) Berger; (yellow card) 80' Zuffi; (yellow card) 90+4' Barberis | Attendance: 6,750; Referee: (Switzerland) Guido Wildhaber (Kerzers) |
Note: Solothurn without Du Buisson and Maiano (both suspended). FCB without Henry (suspended), Sas, Fabinho (both injured) and Salvi was not in the 16-man squad (18 were allowed on the match sheet at that time). FCB with new head-coach Guy Mathez. Yellow card against Plaschy after just 42 seconds for a dangerous foul.

| 7 March 1998 Round 2 | Basel | 4–2 | Kriens | St. Jakob Stadium, Basel |
| 17:30 | Henry 8' (1:0); Kreuzer (yellow card) 25'; Frick 39' (2:2); Frick 64' (3:2); Henry (yellow card) 89'; Knup 90+2' (4:1) | FCB summary | (yellow card) 1' Egli; (yellow card) 19' Schwizer; 32' (1:1) Benson; 38' (1:2) Zwyssig | Attendance: 7,800; Referee: (Switzerland) Dieter Schoch (Attiswil) |
Note: FCB without Zuffi (suspended), Hartmann, Fabinho, Sas and Salvi (all injured). 69th minute: Frick substituted out with a bruised pelvis; 79th minute: Webber substituted out with an ankle injury. Kriens were without Burri (injured).

| 15 March 1998 Round 3 | Young Boys | 2–2 | Basel | Wankdorf Stadium, Bern |
| 14:30 | Smajić (yellow card) 5'; Lengen (yellow card) 23'; Smajić 50' (1:0); Ivanov (yellow card) 74'; Ivanov 85' (pen. 2:2) | FCB summary | (yellow card) 67' Kreuzer; (red card) 68' Mathez (head-coach, not on pitch); 73' (1:1) Barberis; (yellow card) 73' Gaudino; 76' (1:2) Kreuzer; (yellow card) 87' Henry | Referee: (Switzerland) Claude Detruche (Thônex) |
Note: YB without Lingenhag, Streun, Vukotic, Brechbühl (all injured) and Eich (youth team). FCB without Salvi, Sas and Fabinho (all injured). YB honored as National League B champions before the match. Shots on the goal post: (46th minute/1st half) Knup. 58th minute, Bekirovski. 68th minute: FCB coach Mathez sent onto the stands. 85th minute, Smajic substituted out with a broken shoulder. Inadequate, erratic refereeing. Lacking feel for the game, inconsistent, and unfocused in set-piece decisions. Very poor condition of the pitch.

| 21 March 1998 Round 4 | Basel | 3–6 | Xamax | St. Jakob Stadium, Basel |
| 17:30 | Gaudino 2' (1:0); Frick (yellow card) 24'; Webber (red card) 29'; Pérez 51' (2:3); Knup 53' (3:3); Mathez (head-coach, not on field) (red card) 64'; Gaudino (yellow card) 66'; Mendi (yellow card) 80' | FCB summary | 7' (1:1) Rueda; (yellow card) 8' Hamann; 25' (1:2) Halili; 38' (1:3) Rothenbühler; 61' (3:4) Zambaz; 81' (3:5) Maslov; 90+1' (3:6) Zambaz | Attendance: 10,500; Referee: (Switzerland) René Rogalla Wallisellen |
Note: FCB without Salvi, Sas, Fabinho, and Disseris (all injured), as well as Kreuzer, Henry, and Hasler (all suspended). Xamax were without Isabella (injured). 64th minute, FCB coach Guy Mathez was sent to the stands for dissent. The refereeing trio's performance was inconsistent.

| 29 March 1998 Round 5 | Lugano | 0–0 | Basel | Cornaredo, Lugano |
| 14:30 | Fernandez (yellow card) 41'; Wegmann (yellow card) 48'; Lendvai (yellow card) 51'; Giannini (yellow card) 55'; Anderson (yellow card) 85' | FCB summary | (yellow card) 22' Zuffi; (yellow card) 34' Tschopp; (yellow card) 55' Knup | Attendance: 3,900; Referee: (Switzerland) Guido Wildhaber (Kerzers) |
Note: Lugano without Gimenez, Vieira, Allenspach (all injured) and Bullo (suspended); FCB without Kreuzer, Frick, Gaudino, Webber, Hasler (all suspended), Fabinho, Sas, Salvi, Disseris (all injured). Luis Calapes made his debut. FCB coach Guy Mathez watched the game from the opposite stand due to a suspension. 31st minute, tactical change after the Lugano substitution from Enrique to Andersen, Andersen played in the center forward position.

| 4 April 1998 Round 6 | Basel | 3–1 | Etoile Carouge | St. Jakob Stadium, Basel |
| 17:30 | Gaudino 11' (1:0); Barberis (yellow card) 31'; Kondé (yellow card) 49'; Orlando (yellow card) 55'; Gaudino 72' (2:0); Gaudino 77' (3:1) | FCB summary | (yellow card) 10' Djorkaeff; (yellow card) 42' Duchosal; 76' (2:1) Hertig | Attendance: 6,500; Referee: (Switzerland) Jürg Herrmann (Hinterkapplen (Wohlen bei Bern)) |
Note: Basel were without Frick (suspended), Hartmann, Fabinho, and Salvi (all injured). Carouge were without Croci, Giuntini, and Cissé (all suspended), Bertone and Rapo (both injured), as well as Villiot and Bazdarevic (both not in the squad). 79th-minute, a goal from Mendi was disallowed (offside?).

| 8 April 1998 Round 7 | Baden | 3–1 | Basel | Esp Stadium, Fislisbach |
| 19:30 | Dnibi 39' (1:1); Casamento 56' (2:1); Lüthi 71' (3:1) | FCB summary | 6' (0:1) Knup; (yellow card) 70' Pérez; (yellow card) 78' Calapes (not on pitch). | Attendance: 3,450; Referee: (Liechtenstein) Roland Beck (Triesenberg) |
Note: Baden were without Viera, Torghele, Rossi (all suspended), Oldani, Hubeli and Wallon (all injured). Basel were without Salvi, Hartmann, Fabinho and Disseris (all injured). 78th minute, yellow card for Calapes for kicking the ball away, as substitute warming up, not on the pitch).

| 19 April 1998 Round 8 | Basel | 0–0 | Baden | St. Jakob Stadium, Basel |
| 19:30 | Gaudino (yellow card) 69'; Calapes (yellow card) 74' | FCB summary | (yellow card) 62' Rossi; (yellow card) 70' Adriano | Attendance: 6,000; Referee: (Switzerland) Roberto Ferrari |
Note: Basel without Huber, Zuffi, Hartmann, Fabinho and Salvi (all injured). Baden without Oldani, Hubeli (both injured) and Okolosi (trial in France). 53rd minute, a shot from Gaudino rebounded off the post.

| 25 April 1998 Round 9 | Etoile Carouge | 2–0 | Basel | Stade de la Fontenette, Carouge |
| 17:30 | Elmira (yellow card) 37'; Croci (yellow card) 57'; Djorkaeff 78' (1:0); Rothenbühler 86' (2:0) | FCB summary | (yellow card) 46' Barberis; (yellow card) 59' Hartmann | Attendance: 1,180; Referee: (Switzerland) Guido Wildhaber (Kerzers) |
Note: Etoile Carouge were without Duchosal, Aeby, Cravero (all injured), Escofet (ill) and Bazdarevic (Studying). FCB without Huber, Salvi, Zuffi, Konde, Fabinho (injured) and Webber (ill).

| 29 April 1998 Round 10 | Basel | 0–0 | Lugano | St. Jakob Stadium, Basel |
| 19:30 | Ceccaroni (yellow card) 53' | FCB summary | (yellow card) 44' Giménez; (yellow card) 88' Giannini | Attendance: 6,000; Referee: (Switzerland) Marcel Vollenweider (Rüti, Zürich) |
Note: FCB without Huber, Salvi, Henry, Fabinho (all injured) and Barberis (suspended). Lugano were without Brenna, Enrique (both suspended), Vivas (international duty), Andersen, Vieira and Allenspach (all injured). 58th minute, FCB tactical change Zuffi played in midfield, Reimann in defense.

| 2 May 1998 Round 11 | Xamax | 2–1 | Basel | Stade de la Maladière (1924), Neuchâtel |
| 19:30 | Wittl 16' (1:1); Martinović 45' (2:1); Maslov (yellow card) 70'; Delay (yellow card) 81' | FCB summary | (yellow card) 1' Knup; 11' (0:1) Frick; (yellow card) 57' Ceccaroni | Attendance: 6,500; Referee: (Switzerland) André Daina (Eclepens) |
Note: Xamax were without Perret (suspended), Chanlot (internally suspended), Corminbúuf, Moret, and Isabella (all injured). Basel were without Huber, Salvi, Henry, Gaudino, and Fabinho (all injured). 9th minute, Rueda left the field with a strain. Czech U21 international Pechoucek made his debut for Basel. The refereeing trio delivered a simply inadequate and error-prone performance.

| 9 May 1998 Round 12 | Basel | 4–1 | Young Boys | St. Jakob Stadium, Basel |
| 19:30 | Frick 25' (1:0); Pěchouček 32' (2:0); Kreuzer (yellow card) 34'; Knup (yellow card) 43'; Frick 47' (3:0); Gaudino 52' (4:0); Kondé (yellow card) 71' | FCB summary | 71' (pen.) Vukotić | Attendance: 13,000; Referee: (Switzerland) Carlo Bertolini (Vira-Gambarogno) |
Note: FCB without Salvi, Henry, Barberis and Fabinho (all injured) as well as Ceccaroni (suspended). YB without Streun, Smajic and Bekirovski (all injured) as well as Gerber (suspended).

| 17 May 1998 Round 13 | Kriens | 1–3 | Basel | Stadion Kleinfeld, Kriens |
| 16:00 | Esposito (yellow card) 16'; Disler (yellow card) 66'; Erni (yellow card) 68'; Rölli 73' (1:1); Burri (penalty missed) 89′ | FCB summary | (yellow card) 3' Reimann; (red card) 12' Pěchouček; (yellow card) 45' Zuffi; 49' (0:1) Frick; 75' (1:2) Frick; 90+3' Zuffi | Attendance: 5,000; Referee: (Switzerland) Dieter Schoch (Attiswil) |
Note: Kriens were without Bonnafous (injured) and Stoop (not in the squad). FCB without Ceccaroni, Knup, Konde (all suspended), Henry, Salvi, Barberis, and Fabinho (all injured). After Pechoucek's sending-off, Basel played with Zuffi in midfield and Frick as their lone striker. 89th minute, FCB goalkeeper Stefan Huber saved the penalty-kick from Reto Burri. There were disturbances after the final whistle by Basel "fans" who attacked the refereeing trio.

| 24 May 1998 Round 14 | Basel | 3–0 | Solothurn | St. Jakob Stadium, Basel |
| 16:00 | Kreuzer 4' (1:0); Gaudino 41' (2:0); Reimann (yellow card) 49'; Frick 57' (3:0); Pérez (yellow card) 64' | FCB summary | (yellow card) 40' Roth; (yellow card) 42' Aebi | Attendance: 36,500 (sold-out); Referee: (Switzerland) Urs Meier (Wettingen and Würenlos) |
Note: Basel were without Pechoucek (suspended), Salvi, Henry, Knup, Dobrovoljski, and Fabinho (all injured). Solothurn were without Knutti and Vifian (both injured). In the 50th minute, Konde replaced Disseris as man-marker, with Tschopp moving into midfield. No disturbances occurred before, during, or after the match. This was the last match in the St. Jakob Stadium before it was knocked down and replaced by the St. Jakob-Park.

==== League table ====
| Pos | Team | Pld | W | D | L | GF | GA | GD | Pts | Qualification |
|---|---|---|---|---|---|---|---|---|---|---|
| 1 | Xamax | 14 | 7 | 5 | 2 | 35 | 22 | +13 | 26 | Remain in 1998–99 Nationalliga A |
| 2 | Lugano | 14 | 6 | 5 | 3 | 15 | 12 | +3 | 23 | Promoted |
| 3 | Basel | 14 | 6 | 4 | 4 | 27 | 22 | +5 | 22 | Remain in 1998–99 Nationalliga A |
| 4 | BSC Young Boys | 14 | 6 | 4 | 4 | 20 | 23 | −3 | 22 | Promoted |
| 5 | Solothurn | 14 | 6 | 3 | 5 | 17 | 15 | +2 | 21 | Remain in 1998–99 Nationalliga B |
| 6 | Kriens | 14 | 4 | 4 | 6 | 19 | 25 | −6 | 16 | Relegated |
| 7 | Baden | 14 | 3 | 3 | 8 | 15 | 23 | −8 | 12 | Remain in 1998–99 Nationalliga B |
| 8 | Étoile Carouge | 14 | 3 | 2 | 9 | 13 | 19 | −6 | 11 | Relegated |

Source: rsssf.com

=== Swiss Cup ===
| 15 November 1997 Round 5 | SC Buochs | 2–7 (a.e.t.) | Basel | Stadion Seefeld, Buochs |
| 16:00 | Cavallucci 22' (pen. 1:1); Meier (yellow card) 33'; Bieri 54' (2:1); Von Flüe (yellow card) 90'; Barmettler (yellow card) 119' | FCB summary | 17' (0:1) Zuffi; (yellow card) 22' Nemtsoudis; (yellow card) 54' Henry; 86' (2:2) Subiat; 96' (2:3) Subiat; 101' (2:4) Subiat; 112' (2:5) Knup; 117' (2:6) Knup; 120+1' (2:7) Henry | Attendance: 2,500; Referee: (Switzerland) René Rogalla (Wallisellen) |
Note: SC Buochs played the 1997–98 season in the 1. Liga (fourth-tier). SC Buochs without Baumann (injured); FCB without Gaudino and Sas (not in the squad), Mendi (U-18 national team), Salvi (ill, on the bench). 66th minute, tactical change for Basel, Berger played on the left after coming on, Frick on the right in midfield, Barberis at full-back. After coming on, Knup played as a striker, Zuffi in midfield.

| 21 February 1998 Round 6 | Xamax | 2–0 | Basel | Stade de la Maladière (1924), Neuchâtel |
| 18:15 | Wittl (yellow card) 34'; Jeanneret (yellow card) 50'; Martinović 64' (1:0); Halili 71' (2:0); Hamann (yellow card) 76' | FCB summary | (yellow card) 15' Webber; (yellow card) 20' (yellow-red card) 45' Henry; (yellow card) 90+1' Gaudino | Attendance: 3,900; Referee: (Switzerland) Massimo Busacca |
Note: Xamax without Alicarte, Moret and Boughanem (all injured); Hamann as libero after the break. FCB without Fabinho (injured). 91st minute: a shot from Jeanneret bounced off the post.

== See also ==
- History of FC Basel
- List of FC Basel players
- List of FC Basel seasons

== Sources ==
- Rotblau: Jahrbuch Saison 2015/2016. Publisher: FC Basel Marketing AG. ISBN 978-3-7245-2050-4
- Rotblau: Jahrbuch Saison 2017/2018. Publisher: FC Basel Marketing AG. ISBN 978-3-7245-2189-1
- Die ersten 125 Jahre / 2018. Publisher: Josef Zindel im Friedrich Reinhardt Verlag, Basel. ISBN 978-3-7245-2305-5
- 1997–98 Verein "Basler Fussballarchiv” homepage
- 1997–98 at Joggeli.ch
- 1997–98 at RSSSF
