= They Cage the Animals At Night =

1984 book by Jennings Michael Burch

- Author: Jennings Michael Burch
- Language: English
- Genre: Autobiography
- Publication date: 1984

They Cage the Animals at Night (1984) is an autobiography written by Jennings Michael Burch. It tells the story of his childhood, detailing his experience with foster care, with an epilogue of what happened to the family's members. In the book, he talks about traveling to various foster homes after being abandoned by his mother, his experiences in each of them, and how he relied upon a stuffed animal he named "Doggie".

American musician Michael Jackson wanted to direct an adaptation of the work with Bryan Michael Stoller, whom he previously worked with for Miss Cast Away, entitling it Home of the Angels. The film was never produced.
