= Daniel Dobrovoljski =

Russian footballer

Personal information
- Date of birth: 9 June 1975 (age 51)
- Place of birth: Russia
- Height: 1.77 m (5 ft 10 in)
- Positions: Forward; midfielder

Senior career*
Years	Team	Apps	(Gls)
1995–1996	FC Wangen	24	(4)
1996–1997	VfB Stuttgart II	29	(9)
1997–1998	FC Basel	16	(2)
1998–1999	→ VfR Mannheim (loan)	21	(3)
1999–2001	FC Locarno	31	(16)
2001–2002	FC Vaduz	6	(1)
2002–2004	Austria Lustenau	6	(2)
- * Club domestic league appearances and goals

Daniel Dobrovoljski (born 9 June 1975) is a Russian former professional footballer who played for in the late 1990s and early 2000s. He played mainly in the position as forward, but also as midfielder.

== Career ==
Dobrovoljski first played his football with local amateur club FC Wangen 1905 e.V. In the summer period 1996 he moved on to play for VfB Stuttgart Amateure.

Dobrovoljski joined FC Basel's first team before their 1997–98 season, signing a two-year professional contract, under head coach Jörg Berger. After playing in three test games Dobrovoljski played his domestic league debut for the club in the home game in the St. Jakob Stadium on 12 July 1997, being substituted in during the 75th minute for Gaetano Giallanza as Basel played a 0–0 draw with Étoile Carouge. Dobrovoljski scored his first goal for his club in the home game on 23 August. He was substituted in during the 70th minute for Jürgen Hartmann. Seven minutes later Dobrovoljski scored the goal, it was the two/two equaliser, as Basel won 3–2 against St. Gallen.

In this season Dobrovoljski played 16 games, being substituted in 15 times and in the starting team once. To gain more playing time Basel loaned Dobrovoljski out to VfR Mannheim, who at that time played in the Regionalliga Süd the fourth tier of German football. After he returned from his loan period, he played in a few test matches and then transferred to FC Locarno. During the two- and a-bit seasons with the club, Dobrovoljski played a total of 31 games for FC Locarno scoring a total of four goals. 16 of these games were in the Nationalliga A, two in the Swiss Cup and 13 were friendly games. He scored two goals in the domestic league and the other two during the test games.

In the 1999–2000 season with Locarno, Dobrovoljski played in the 1st League, the third tier of Swiss football. At the end of the season, they were group three winners and qualified for the promotion play-offs. In the first round of the play-offs they beat Red Star Zürich twice and in the next round with a win and a draw against FC Wohlen achieved promotion to the Nationalliga B.

In the 2000–01 Swiss Football League season Locarno held their position in the second division. For the following season Dobrovoljski then played with FC Vaduz and then moved on to play two seasons with Austria Lustenau in the Austrian Football First League.
