= Maurizio Gaudino =

German footballer

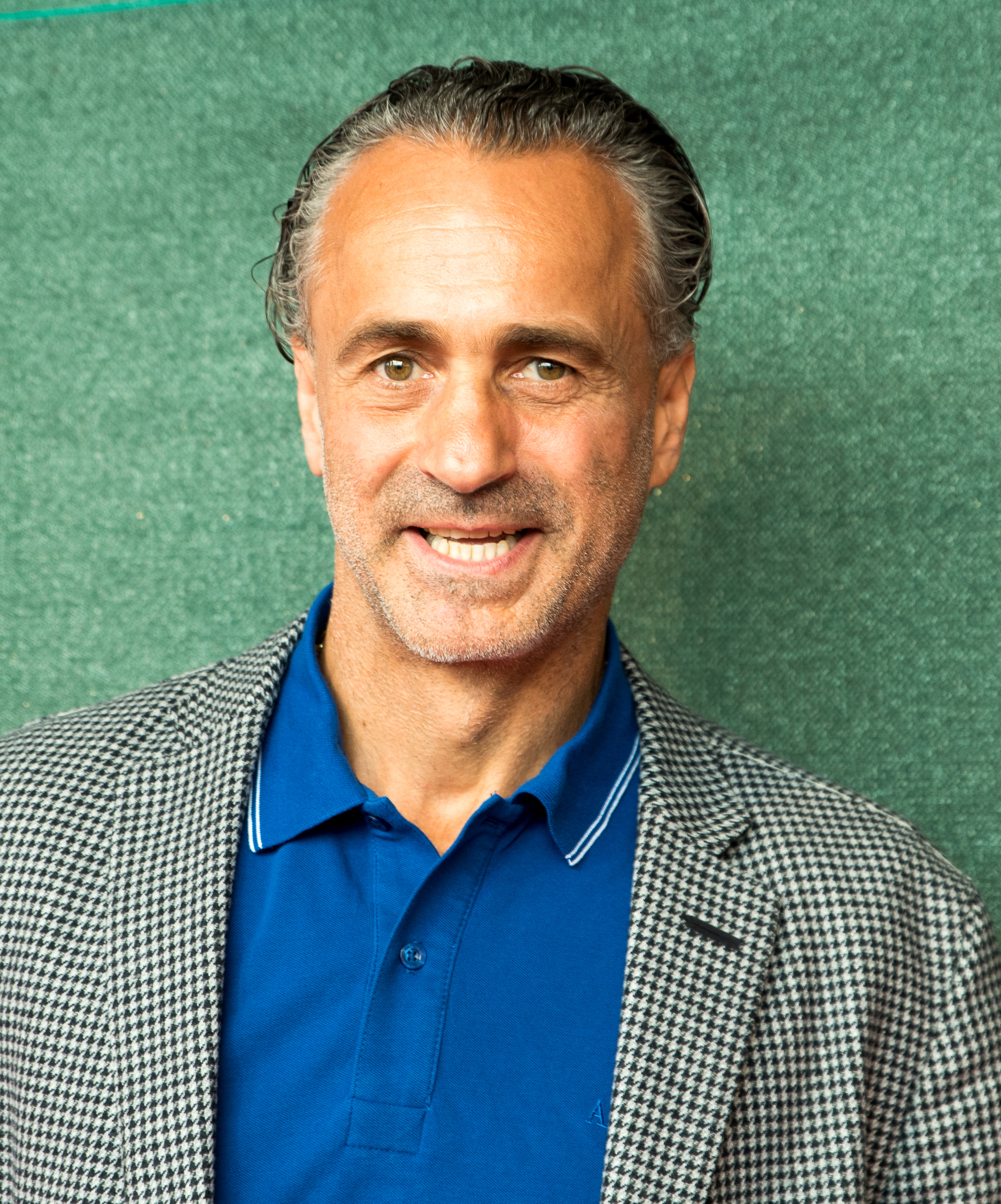
- Gaudino in 2016

Personal information
- Full name: Maurizio Gaudino
- Date of birth: 12 December 1966 (age 59)
- Place of birth: Brühl, West Germany
- Height: 1.84 m (6 ft 0 in)
- Position: Attacking midfielder

Team information
- Current team: SSV Reutlingen (director of football)

Youth career
- 1972–1981: TSG Rheinau
- 1981–1984: Waldhof Mannheim

Senior career*
Years	Team	Apps	(Gls)
1984–1987	Waldhof Mannheim	60	(9)
1987–1993	VfB Stuttgart	171	(30)
1993–1997	Eintracht Frankfurt	75	(16)
1994–1995	→ Manchester City (loan)	20	(3)
1995–1996	→ Club América (loan)	15	(1)
1997–1998	FC Basel	30	(10)
1998–1999	VfL Bochum	20	(2)
1999–2002	Antalyaspor	55	(8)
2003	Waldhof Mannheim	13	(0)
Total		469	(79)

International career
1993–1994	Germany	5	(1)

Managerial career
- 2004–2005: SV Waldhof Mannheim (caretaker)
- * Club domestic league appearances and goals

Maurizio Gaudino (German pronunciation: [maʊˈʁɪtsi̯oː ɡaʊˈdiːnoː], Italian: [mauˈrittsjo ɡauˈdiːno]; born 12 December 1966) is a German football coach and former professional footballer who is director of football for SSV Reutlingen 05.

As a player, he was a midfielder who notably played in the Bundesliga for VfB Stuttgart, Eintracht Frankfurt and VfL Bochum and in the Premier League for Manchester City. He also played top flight football in Mexico, Turkey and Switzerland for Club América, FC Basel and Antalyaspor. He also played for Waldhof Mannheim where he both started and finished his career. He was capped 5 times by Germany, scoring one goal.

== Playing career ==
Gaudino was capped five times for Germany in 1993 and 1994, and was in their squad for the 1994 World Cup.

Gaudino played 294 Bundesliga games for Waldhof Mannheim, VfB Stuttgart, Eintracht Frankfurt and VfL Bochum. He won the league title with Stuttgart in 1992. He also helped them to the 1989 UEFA Cup Final and got himself on the scoresheet in the first leg, although they ultimately lost to a Diego Maradona inspired Napoli.

In 1995, he was loaned out to Manchester City and helped the team end the season with some magnificent performances including a 3–2 victory over the league champions that year Blackburn Rovers. He scored three times in 20 league games, but City still finished 17th in the Premier League (just three places clear of relegation) after a promising early season run of form had hinted at a UEFA Cup place or even a push for the league title.

Gaudino joined FC Basel's first team for their 1997–98 season under head coach Jörg Berger. After playing in five test games Gaudino played his domestic league debut for his new club in the away game in the Olympique de la Pontaise on 9 July 1997 as Basel were defeated 0–3 by Lausanne-Sport. He scored his first goal for his club on 19 July in the home game in the St. Jakob Stadium against Servette. But this penalty goal could not help the team, because Basel were defeated 1–3. Gaudino scored one hat-trick for the club, this was on 4 April 1998 as Basel beat Étoile Carouge 3–1. Gaudino played with the club for just this one season. During this time he played a total of 42 games for Basel scoring a total of 16 goals. 30 of these games were in the Nationalliga A, one in the Swiss Cup and 11 were friendly games. He scored 10 goals in the domestic league, the other six were scored during the test games.

Following his time in Basel Gaudino signed for VfL Bochum and he stayed here only one season. He transferred to Antalyaspor in 1999 and played for them until Antalyaspor's relegation to Second League A Category in 2001–02 season.

== Coaching career ==
In 2004 he took temporary charge of SV Waldhof Mannheim.

On 11 May 2015, Gaudino was appointed as new director of football at SSV Reutlingen 05 valid from 1 July 2015.

== Personal life ==
Gaudino is son of Italian emigrants from Campania. His father was born in Orta di Atella while his mother is from Frattamaggiore. His son Gianluca is currently playing for Swiss club Lausanne Sport.

In 2006, Gaudino took part in a charity football match between England and Germany, based on the 1966 FIFA World Cup Final. In a game consisting of celebrities and former players, he was rugby tackled by future British prime minister Boris Johnson.

== Honours ==
VfB Stuttgart

- UEFA Cup: runner-up 1988–89
- Bundesliga: 1991–92
- DFL-Supercup: 1992

Antalyaspor

- Turkish Cup: runner-up 1999–2000
