= Marco Sas =

Dutch footballer

Personal information
- Date of birth: 16 February 1971 (age 55)
- Place of birth: Vlaardingen, Netherlands
- Position: Central defender

Youth career
- Sparta Rotterdam

Senior career*
Years	Team	Apps	(Gls)
1988–1991	Sparta Rotterdam	49	(0)
1991–1996	NAC Breda	97	(0)
1996–1997	Bradford City	31	(3)
1997–1998	FC Basel	14	(0)
1998–2001	SV Deltasport Vlaardingen		

International career
1988–1990	Netherlands U21	4	(0)
- * Club domestic league appearances and goals

Marco Sas (born 16 February 1971) is a Dutch retired footballer who played for Sparta Rotterdam, NAC Breda, Bradford City and FC Basel.

== Career ==
Sas advanced from the youth team to Sparta Rotterdam first team in 1988 and stayed with them for three seasons. During this time Sas made four appearances for the Netherlands U21 team. In 1991 he transferred to NAC Breda, where he played for five years. In 1996 Sas moved to England on a free transfer and signed for Bradford City, but after one season he moved on to Switzerland.

Sas joined FC Basel's first team for their 1997–98 season under head coach Jörg Berger. After playing in four test games _ played his domestic league debut for the club in the away game in the Stade Olympique de la Pontaise on 9 July 1997 as Basel were defeated 0–3 by Lausanne-Sport.

Sas was injured in October and due to this he did not play again before the winter break. He made a come back during the test games, but the injury re-occurred. Later Sas left the club and ended his professional career. During his short time with the club Sas played a total of 24 games for Basel. 14 of these games were in the Nationalliga A and 10 were friendly games. He scored one goal during these friendly games.

== Sources ==
- Rotblau: Jahrbuch Saison 2017/2018. Publisher: FC Basel Marketing AG. ISBN 978-3-7245-2189-1
- Die ersten 125 Jahre. Publisher: Josef Zindel im Friedrich Reinhardt Verlag, Basel. ISBN 978-3-7245-2305-5
- Verein "Basler Fussballarchiv" Homepage
