= Marco Pérez (Liechtenstein footballer) =

Liechtenstein footballer

Personal information
- Full name: Marco Pérez Sancho
- Date of birth: 21 March 1978 (age 48)
- Place of birth: Grabs, Switzerland
- Height: 1.78 m (5 ft 10 in)
- Position: Midfielder

Youth career
- –1993: FC Triesen
- 1993–1996: FC Vaduz

Senior career*
Years	Team	Apps	(Gls)
1996–1997	FC Vaduz	0	(0)
1997–2000	FC Basel 1893	62	(5)
2000	→ SR Delémont (loan)	3	(0)
2001	FC Wangen	13	(1)
2001–2006	FC Vaduz	130	(11)
2006–2007	SC Eisenstadt	15	(1)
2007–2008	First Vienna FC	26	(1)
2008–2014	Wiener Sport-Club	138	(3)
2014–2016	ASK-BSC Bruck/Leitha	51	(0)

International career
1996	Liechtenstein	1	(1)

Managerial career
- 2016–2017: Karabakh Wien U16
- 2017–: Karabakh Wien II
- * Club domestic league appearances and goals

Marco Pérez Sancho (born 21 March 1978) is a former international footballer from Liechtenstein who last played as a midfielder for ASK-BSC Bruck/Leitha.

== Club career ==
Perez played his youth football with FC Triesen and moved to FC Vaduz in 1993. He advanced to their first team, in the third tier of Swiss football, in the 1996–97 season.

Perez joined FC Basel's first team for their 1997–98 season under head coach Jörg Berger. After playing in two test games Perez played his domestic league debut for his new club in the home game in the St. Jakob Stadium on 15 August 1997 as Basel won 2–1 against Aarau. He scored his first goal for his club on 21 March 1998 in the home game against Xamax, but he could not help the team, because Basel were defeated 3–6.

In Basel's 1999–2000 season Perez did not come to much playing time, so in the winter break he was loaned out to SR Delémont, who at that time were in the Nationalliga A/B Playoff-round against relegation. In the following season Perez played in 4 friendly matches, but then moved on to FC Wangen b. O. During his time with the club, Perez played a total of 95 games for Basel, scoring a total of 6 goals. 62 of these games were in the Nationalliga A, two in the Swiss Cup, six in the UI Cip and 25 were friendly games. He scored five goals in the domestic league and the other was scored during the test games.

After playing for FC Wangen b. O., Perez returned to FC Vaduz, where he played for five seasons in the second tier of Swiss football. He played 130 league games and won the Liechtenstein Football Cup six times.

Then Perez moved to Austria, first to SC Eisenstadt for one season, then to First Vienna FC also for one season and then to Wiener Sport-Club where he played regularly for six seasons. Finally, he moved to ASK-BSC Bruck/Leitha, which was where he ended his active football career. He was later employed by FC Karabakh as coach for their youth teams.

== International career ==
Making his debut (and ultimately his only appearance for Liechtenstein) in a friendly against Germany in 1996, Pérez managed to score a goal in his sole international foray, a 9–1 thrashing at the hands of Die Mannschaft.

== Personal life ==
Pérez was born in Switzerland, in Grabs, Switzerland, to a Spanish mother and a Slovene father (although he did not take his surname or citizenship, as his parents were not married).

== Career statistics ==
Scores and results list Liechtenstein's goal tally first.

#	Date	Venue	Opponent	Score	Result	Competition
1	4 June 1996	Mannheim, Germany	Germany	1-7	1-9	Friendly

== Sources ==
- Rotblau: Jahrbuch Saison 2017/2018. Publisher: FC Basel Marketing AG. ISBN 978-3-7245-2189-1
- Die ersten 125 Jahre. Publisher: Josef Zindel im Friedrich Reinhardt Verlag, Basel. ISBN 978-3-7245-2305-5
- Verein "Basler Fussballarchiv" Homepage
