= Nestor Subiat =

Swiss footballer (born 1966)

Néstor Subiat
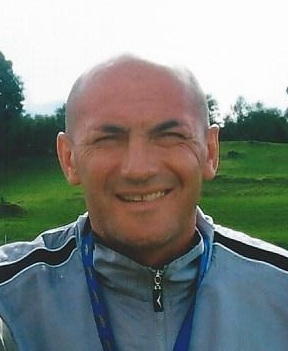

Personal information
- Full name: Néstor Gabriel Subiat
- Date of birth: 23 April 1966 (age 60)
- Place of birth: Buenos Aires, Argentina
- Height: 1.83 m (6 ft 0 in)
- Position: Striker

Youth career
- Mulhouse

Senior career*
Years	Team	Apps	(Gls)
1984–1992	Mulhouse	163	(55)
1990	→ Strasbourg (loan)	19	(6)
1992–1994	Lugano	55	(25)
1994–1998	Grasshoppers	48	(33)
1997	→ Basel (loan)	7	(4)
1998–2000	Saint-Étienne	26	(8)
2000	Étoile Carouge	11	(6)
2001	Lucerne	7	(0)
2001–2002	SC Orange		
Total		336	(137)

International career
1994–1996	Switzerland	15	(6)
- * Club domestic league appearances and goals

Néstor Gabriel Subiat (born 23 April 1966) is a Swiss former professional footballer who played as a striker.

He never played professionally in his country, representing several clubs in France and Switzerland and appearing with the latter national team at the 1994 World Cup.

== Club career ==
The son of a former FC Mulhouse player, also called Néstor and also a striker, Subiat was born in Buenos Aires, Argentina, and started his career precisely at the French club, as a defender but already showing scoring abilities, which prompted a move up front.

After a loan at RC Strasbourg Alsace, Subiat played until 1992 at Mulhouse, scoring a further 25 goals combined as both seasons were spent in Ligue 2. He then moved to Switzerland for the following six years, scoring aplenty for AC Lugano, Grasshopper Club Zürich – even though he only played regularly in his first year – and FC Basel and winning three national championships with the second team.

Subiat joined FC Basel's first team on loan for the first half of their 1997–98 season under head coach Jörg Berger. Subiat played his domestic league debut for the club in the home game in the St. Jakob Stadium on 28 September 1997 as Basel were defeated 0–1 by Lausanne-Sport. He scored his first goal for the club one week later, on 5 October, in the away game against Étoile Carouge, but this could not help the team, as Basel were defeated 1–2. Subiat scored a hat-trick for Basel in their Swiss Cup fifth round match against SC Buochs as Basel won 7–2 after extra time on 15 November. During his short period with the club, Subiat played a total of eight games for Basel scoring a total of seven goals. Seven of these games were in the Nationalliga A and one in the Swiss Cup. He scored four goals in the domestic league and the other three were scored in the above mentioned cup game. He then returned to GC for the second half of the season.

In the last four years of his career, Subiat appeared sparingly at professional level in both countries, with AS Saint-Étienne, Étoile Carouge FC and FC Lucerne, retiring in 2002 with amateurs SC Orange (France).

== International career ==
Subiat chose to represent Switzerland internationally, his first cap coming in 1994. He participated at that year's FIFA World Cup, appearing as a substitute in three scoreless games.

In total, Subiat scored six times in 15 matches over a two-year period.

== Sources ==
- Rotblau: Jahrbuch Saison 2017/2018. Publisher: FC Basel Marketing AG. ISBN 978-3-7245-2189-1
- Die ersten 125 Jahre. Publisher: Josef Zindel im Friedrich Reinhardt Verlag, Basel. ISBN 978-3-7245-2305-5
- Verein "Basler Fussballarchiv" Homepage
