= Collège Champittet =

Coordinates: 46.507288°N 6.6403559°E

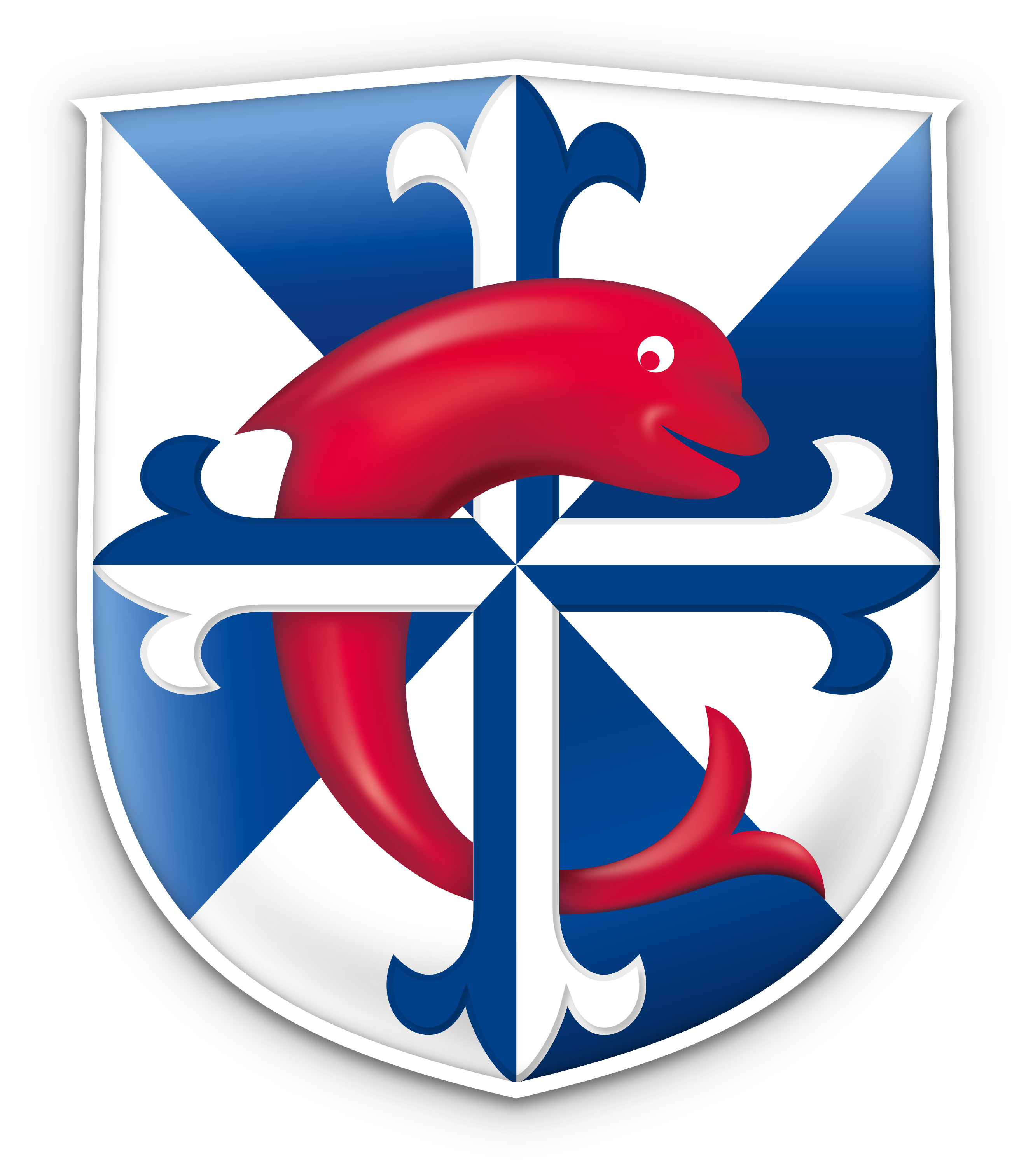
- Pully; Vaud; Switzerland

Information
- Type: Private school, International school Day & Boarding
- Founded: 1903
- Director: Philippe de Korodi
- Classes offered: Kindergarten/Primary/Secondary
- Website: www.nordangliaeducation.com/en/our-schools/switzerland/college-champittet/champittet-pully

Collège Champittet is a Swiss school in the canton de Vaud operated by Nord Anglia Education, a group of 82 schools around the world. The school offers an academic education for students ages 3–19 and has a campus located in the vicinity of Lausanne in Pully. It offers a Kindergarten, primary and a secondary education. The school offers a full boarding service for students who are willing to live in the Pully campus. The school has a 950-student capacity.

The school was established in 1903 by a group of Dominican fathers as a Catholic boarding school for French boys. They were in charge of the establishment until 1951, when they passed on the leadership of the school to capitular fathers of the Great Saint-Bernard order, who left the school in the care of a group of professional educators in 1998. During this time, in 1984, the school became co-educational and accepted girls.

Collège Champittet offers a bilingual program French/English for all students. A bilingual or Francophone curriculum and a program for non-francophone students (French as Foreign Language (FLE)) is also available. For the upper secondary students (age 14 to 19), students can choose between the Swiss Maturity, French Baccalaureate, the FLE program, and the International Baccalaureate Diploma Program.

Champittet hosts over 50 different nationalities (40% of which are Swiss), nearly all students are either French native speakers, bilingual or plurilingual (20% are native English speakers).

Many choices of co-curricular and extra-curricular activities are available for students: Global Citizenship, Model UN, Debate Club, music, sports etc. Variety of educational and humanitarian events are possible because of the involvement of Champittet in several charitable projects through Foundation Collège Champittet which collaborates with: Foundation Avotra in Madagascar, Foundation Jan & Oscar in Thailand, and 1001 Fontaines in Cambodia.

Champittet recently absorbed the students from L'Institut Mont-Olivet, a neighbouring school which closed in 2016.

== Religion ==
As College Champittet has Christian roots, it is values-driven. Various activities of the chaplaincy are aimed primarily at Catholic children but are open to any children no matter their religion, or because they want to better understand the Christian reality or prepare for baptism. On the occasion of celebrations or liturgical times, several masses are offered to students during the school year. Preparation for the sacraments (Baptism, First Communion and Confirmation) and a choir organization of children and young people are offered by the college's chaplaincy.

== Charity ==
The Collège Champittet Foundation is non-profit and independent from Nord Anglia Education. The Foundation is working in:

- In Madagascar, in partnership with Foundation Avotra created by Father Stefano.
- In Thailand, in partnership with Foundation Jan & Oscar.
- In Cambodia, in partnership with association 1001 Fontaines.

== Notable alumni ==
- Kevin Scott Allen, American actor
- Sébastien Barberis, football player
- Marcel Brion, writer and member of the Académie française
- Jean-Marie Lovey, bishop
- Bertrand Piccard, Swiss explorer, psychiatrist and environmentalist
- Michel Voïta, comedian
- Dominique de La Rochefoucauld-Montbel, humanitarian diplomat
