= Jan Berger (footballer, born 1976) =

Czech football midfielder

Personal information
- Full name: Jan Berger
- Date of birth: 18 August 1976 (age 50)
- Place of birth: Prague, Czechoslovakia
- Height: 1.84 m (6 ft 0 in)
- Position: Midfielder

Team information
- Current team: East Bengal

Youth career
- until 1986: Sparta Prague
- FC St. Gallen
- until 1994: Grasshopper

Senior career*
| Years | Team | Apps | (Gls) |
| 1994–1997 | Grasshopper | 16 | (0) |
| 1997–1998 | FC Basel | 14 | (2) |
| 1998–1999 | FC Aarau | 24 | (2) |
| 1999–2000 | AC Bellinzona | 14 | (0) |
| 2000 | FC Baden | 13 | (0) |
| 2000–2003 | FC St. Gallen | 45 | (0) |
| 2003–2004 | 1. FK Příbram | 2 | (0) |
| 2004–2006 | FC Sion | 15 | (1) |
| 2005 | → Lausanne Sports (loan) | 8 | (2) |
| 2006–2007 | FC Bulle | 12 | (2) |
| 2007 | CS Chênois | 0 | (0) |
| 2007–2008 | FK Fotbal Třinec | 25 | (3) |
| 2008–2009 | 1. FC Slovácko | 0 | (0) |
| 2009 | East Bengal | | |

International career
| 1997 | Czech Republic U21 | 1 | (0) |
- * Club domestic league appearances and goals as of 8 July 2008

Jan Berger (born 18 August 1976 in Prague, Czechoslovakia) is a Czech retired footballer who played as a midfielder. He last played for East Bengal FC in the I-League.

== Club career ==
As a youth, Jan Berger played for Sparta Prague but when his father, Jan Berger Senior, signed for FC Zürich, his family moved to Switzerland and he continued his youth career with FC St. Gallen. He then moved to the youth department by Grasshopper Club Zürich, later he started his professional career with them in 1994. With Grasshopper Club Zürich, he played 2 UEFA Champions League matches in 1996 and scored 1 goal against Rangers FC.

Berger joined FC Basel's first team for their 1997–98 season under head coach Jörg Berger. He played his domestic league debut for his new club in the home game in the St. Jakob Stadium on 8 November 1997 as Basel won 4–1 against Kriens. He scored his first goal for the club on 1 March 1998 an away game as Basel beat Solothurn. In fact he scored two goals as Basel won 3–2. He spent just one season with the club and during this time Berger played a total of 21 games for Basel scoring just those two goals. 14 of these games were in the Nationalliga A, two in the Swiss Cup and five were friendly games.

In the summer of 1998 Berger signed for FC Aarau. Short spells at AC Bellinzona and FC Baden then followed before he moved to FC St. Gallen, where he spent three years.

In the summer of 2003, he joined Czech club 1. FK Příbram on a free transfer. He played just two games in the Gambrinus liga before moving back to Switzerland to play for FC Sion. His move to Sion did not turn out so good either as he 18 reserve matches compared to his 15 first-team matches and was loaned out to Lausanne Sports in 2005.

He then played in the Swiss 1. Liga and 2. Liga with FC Bulle and CS Chênois, for a short while, before returning to the Czech Republic with FK Fotbal Třinec in 2007. He achieved some good form while playing in the Czech 2. Liga in the 2007/08 season, and in July 2008, he signed for 1. FC Slovácko.

He later headed to India, where he played for two I-League giants Kingfisher East Bengal F.C. and Dempo S.C. before returning to Switzerland.

In 2009, he signed with Swiss side FC Gossau and in 2011, he moved to FC Stans. Then he retired on 1 December 2011. He returned in football fields after his retirement and signed with another Swiss 2. Liga Inter outfit FC Amriswil.

== International career ==
Jan has represented Czech Republic national under-21 football team on one occasion in 1997.

== Personal life ==
He is the son of former Czechoslovak international footballer Jan Berger Sr. and is the brother of footballer Tomáš, the Czech Republic international midfielder Patrik Berger is his cousin.

Berger has a relationship with the Dutch royaltyreporter Sandra Schuurhof, She works for the Dutch TV-station RTL 4.

== Honours ==
East Bengal

- Federation Cup: 2009
