= Postmodern horror =

Subgenre of film

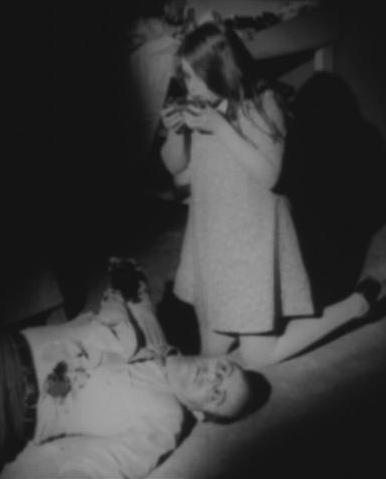
Night of the Living Dead (1968), one of the earliest examples of postmodern horror film

Postmodern horror is a horror film related to the art and philosophy of postmodernism including self-awareness of certain cliches and tropes to the point of parody. Examples of this type of film include George A. Romero's Night of the Living Dead, Tobe Hooper's The Texas Chain Saw Massacre, John Carpenter's slasher film Halloween, and Wes Craven's Scream.

== Background ==
Postmodern horror, which emerged in the turbulent 1960s and 1970s, is defined by several key characteristics. These include the disruption of everyday life through violence, the crossing and violation of boundaries, and a critique of rationality as a reliable framework. It also rejects traditional narrative closure, instead offering open-ended or unresolved storytelling. Additionally, it creates a confined experience of fear for the audience, fostering a sense of immersion.

Examples of this include the famous "rules of surviving a horror movie" speech from Wes Craven's 1996 slasher film Scream and the self-aware characters (including the main protagonist) slowly realizing they're living the plot of one in the 1990 precursor There's Nothing Out There.

== Examples of postmodern horror films ==
- Bride of the Monster (1955)
- Plan 9 from Outer Space (1957)
- Night of the Ghouls (1959)
- Psycho (1960)
- Persona (1966)
- Spider Baby (1967)
- Night of the Living Dead (1968)
- Targets (1968)
- Necromania (1971)
- The Texas Chain Saw Massacre (1974)
- House (1977)
- Halloween (1978)
- Dawn of the Dead (1978)
- Invasion of the Body Snatchers (1978)
- The Brood (1979)
- Alien (1979)
- The Shining (1980)
- The Evil Dead (1981)
- The Howling (1981)
- The Entity (1982)
- The Thing (1982)
- Videodrome (1983)
- The Toxic Avenger (1984)
- A Nightmare on Elm Street (1984)
- Re-Animator (1985)
- Fright Night (1985)
- Chopping Mall (1986)
- Henry: Portrait of a Serial Killer (1986)
- Evil Dead II (1987)
- Anguish (1987)
- Beetlejuice (1988)
- Lady in White (1988)
- Gremlins 2: The New Batch (1990)
- Candyman (1992)
- The Nightmare Before Christmas (1993)
- Wes Craven's New Nightmare (1994)
- From Dusk till Dawn (1996)
- Scream (1996)
- I Know What You Did Last Summer (1997)
- Bride of Chucky (1998)
- The Blair Witch Project (1999)
- American Psycho (2000)
- Final Destination (2000)
- Scary Movie (2000)
- Mulholland Drive (2001)
- Party Monster (2003)
- Shaun of the Dead (2004)
- Night Watch (2004)
- Inland Empire (2006)
- Drag Me to Hell (2009)
- Antichrist (2009)
- Shutter Island (2010)
- The Cabin in the Woods (2012)
- Frankenweenie (2012)
- ParaNorman (2012)
- Hotel Transylvania (2012)
- Abraham Lincoln: Vampire Hunter (2012)
- The Final Girls (2015)
- Get Out (2017)
- The House That Jack Built (2018)
- Bad Times at the El Royale (2018)
- In Fabric (2018)
- Us (2019)
- Midsommar (2019)
- Last Night in Soho (2021)
- Nope (2022)
- Razzennest (2022)
- X film series (2022–2024)
- Beau is Afraid (2023)
- Late Night with the Devil (2023)
- A Different Man (2024)
- The Substance (2024)
- Dracula (2025)
- I Saw the TV Glow (2025)
- Good Boy (2025)
- Weapons (2025)
- Backrooms (2026)
- The Bride! (2026)
- Buddy (2026)

== List of directors associated with postmodern horror ==
- Ed Wood
- George A. Romero
- David Cronenberg
- Wes Craven
- John Carpenter
- David Lynch
- Sam Raimi
- Lars Von Trier
- Tim Burton
- Edgar Wright
- Timur Bekmambetov
- Drew Goddard
- Jordan Peele
- Casper Kelly
- Johannes Grenzfurthner
- Ari Aster
- Ti West

== See also ==
- Postmodernist film
- Social thriller
- Extreme cinema
- Vulgar auteurism
- Art horror
- Folk horror
- American New Wave
- Indiewood
- Analog horror
