= Rolfe Kanefsky =

American film director

Rolfe Kanefsky (born 1969) is an American film writer/director who specializes in horror films.

== Early life ==
Kanefsky grew up in the suburbs of New York and attended Hampshire College where he studied Film. He began writing stories at a young age after his childhood dream of becoming a clown took the backseat to his interest in film. By the time he was twenty-one, Rolfe had written and directed the original cult classic horror spoof There's Nothing Out There. Rolfe eventually moved to California and has since been making his living writing and directing.

== Films ==
Kanefsky has directed 15 of his own films and been the writer on several others. Kanefsky's first film was the comedy/horror feature There's Nothing Out There (1991), a parody of the horror film genre. In the film, a character named Mike has seen every horror film made, and "knows the rules". Mike uses his knowledge of horror movies to survive the movie and terrorize the other characters. This resembles the character Randy in the Scream series of films. Since There's Nothing Out There predates Scream, much has been made of the common elements.

There's Nothing Out There went on to become a hit at the IFP in New York and the closing film at the Florence Film Festival before getting a theatrical release in New York City and Los Angeles. The New York Times was lukewarm, but the L.A. Times, Variety, and The Hollywood Reporter gave it more favorable press. It recently was re-released as a Special Edition DVD from Image Entertainment.

After There's Nothing Out There, Kanefsky directed My Family Treasure (1993), starring Dee Wallace and Theodore Bikel, and co-wrote Red Line (1996), starring Michael Madsen. Kanefsky teamed up with producer Alain Siritzky, who produced his next few features, including Pretty Cool, a teen comedy in the tradition of American Pie, and Tomorrow by Midnight, a dark comedy thriller starring Alexis Arquette and Carol Kane. TBM won much praise in many film festivals, a rave review in the L.A. Times and was awarded Best Feature in the Rhode Island Film Festival and the L.A. FirstGlance Film Festival.

More recently, Kanefsky completed production as both writer and director on the horror/comedy film The Hazing (2004) starring Brad Dourif, Brooke Burke and Parry Shen. The film has been covered on the E! Channel, Stuff magazine, Fangoria magazine, and has received rave reviews from around the world. Kanefsky also completed Corpses, a zombie comedy starring Jeff Fahey and Tiffany Shepis and Nightmare Man, a horror thriller independently produced under his Valkhn Films label, starring Blythe Metz, Tiffany Shepis and Richard Moll as well as Pocket Girl: Pretty Cool Too! – a sequel to his teen comedy Pretty Cool. He has also written & directed the film The Erotic Misadventures of the Invisible Man with Gabriella Hall on the lead based on the comic books of Milo Manara.

Kanefsky was both writer and director of the neo-noir thriller, One in the Gun starring Steven Man, created in 2011. Reviewers all remarked heavily on the inter-woven and deliberately confusing plot lines. This was the primary factor for the reviews given - with ratings ranging from poor, "more often than not making any sense.", fair, "Very little of what you see is meant to be taken at face value" and excellent "[It] veers off into the Twilight Zone for a surreal trip on the wild side".
