= The Nightmare Man =

The Nightmare Man may refer to:

- The Nightmare Man (TV series), a 1981 science fiction drama serial
- The Nightmare Man, a 1988 Point Horror novel by Tessa Krailing
- The Nightmare Man (The Sarah Jane Adventures), a 2010 two-part story of The Sarah Jane Adventures
- Nightmare Man (film), a 2006 horror film
