= Giorgios Nemtsoudis =

Swiss-Greek footballer (born 1973)

Personal information
- Date of birth: 1 January 1973 (age 53)
- Position: Defender

Youth career
- until 1988: SC Young Fellows Juventus
- 1988–1989: Grasshopper Club

Senior career*
| Years | Team | Apps | (Gls) |
| 1989–1997 | Grasshopper Club | 144 | (4) |
| 1995 | → FC Lausanne-Sport (loan) | 5 | (0) |
| 1997–1998 | FC Basel | 4 | (0) |
| 1998–1999 | FC Winterthur | 10 | (0) |
| 2000 | Apollon Kalamarias | 7 | (0) |
| 2001–2003 | FC Winterthur | 19 | (0) |
- * Club domestic league appearances and goals

Giorgios Nemtsoudis (born 1 January 1973) is a retired Swiss-Greek football defender.

Nemtsoudis is the son of Greek immigrants. He played his youth football with local club SC YF Juventus. The then Grasshopper Club sports director Eric Vogel brought the defender from them to the Hardturm and at the age of 16, Nemtsoudis made his debut for the Grasshoppers under head coach Ottmar Hitzfeld. In March 1994 Nemtsoudis had a wordy clash with the then head coach Christian Gross, who then degraded the defender to substitute. There after Nemtsoudis was loaned out to Lausanne-Sport, however, here he did not get much playing time due to his bad relationship with their head coach Martin Trümpler. Nemtsoudis returned to GC after just six months, in total he played with the club for nine seasons.

Nemtsoudis joined FC Basel's first team during September in their 1997–98 season under head coach Jörg Berger. After playing in one test game Nemtsoudis played his domestic league debut for the club in the away game in the Stadion Brügglifeld on 24 September 1997 as Basel were defeated 0–1 by Aarau.

After this, Nemtsoudis played only in four more games and was substituted out three times. After the winter break he did not return to the team. During his short period with the club Nemtsoudis played a total of six games for Basel without scoring a goal. Four of these games were in the Nationalliga A, one in the Swiss Cup and one was a friendly match.

Nemtsoudis signed for FC Winterthur in summer 1998 and played one and a half seasons for them. He then played 12 months with Greek club Apollon Kalamarias and returned to Winterthur. In 2003 Nemtsoudis ended his active playing career. Today Nemtsoudis works in the real estate industry.

== Sources ==
- Rotblau: Jahrbuch Saison 2017/2018. Publisher: FC Basel Marketing AG. ISBN 978-3-7245-2189-1
- Die ersten 125 Jahre. Publisher: Josef Zindel im Friedrich Reinhardt Verlag, Basel. ISBN 978-3-7245-2305-5
- Verein "Basler Fussballarchiv" Homepage
