= Deniz Mendi =

Turkish-Swiss footballer (born 1979)

Personal information
- Date of birth: 27 February 1979 (age 47)
- Place of birth: Balsthal, Switzerland
- Position: Forward

Youth career
- until 1997: FC Klus-Balsthal

Senior career*
Years	Team	Apps	(Gls)
1997–2000	FC Basel	32	(2)
1999	→ FC Winterthur (loan)	8	(0)
2000	→ BSC Young Boys (loan)	12	(3)
2001	→ FC Baden (loan)	20	(4)
2001	İstanbulspor		
2002	Étoile Carouge FC		
2004–2007	FC Solothurn		
2007–2008	FC Grenchen		
2008	FC Olten		
2009	FC Schötz		
2009–2010	FC Wangen bei Olten		
- * Club domestic league appearances and goals

Deniz Mendi (born 27 February 1979) is a retired Turkish-Swiss football forward.

Mendi played his youth football with local club FC Klus-Balsthal. He joined FC Basel's first team for their 1997–98 season under head coach Jörg Berger. After playing in four test games Mendi played his domestic league debut for his new club in the away game in the Stadion Kleinfeld on 10 August 1997 as Basel were defeated 1–3 by Kriens. He scored his first goal for the club on 8 November in the home game in the St. Jakob Stadium, in fact he scored the first two goals in the game, as Basel won 4–1 against Kriens in the return match.

In his first two seasons with the club, Mendi was used mainly as substitute. In his third season, after two appearances in the 1999 UEFA Intertoto Cup, he was loaned out to second tier FC Winterthur until the end of the calendar year. For the second half of the season he was on loan by Young Boys, who at that time also played in the second tier. After a third loan period in the lower league with FC Baden Mendi decided to leave the club. During his time with the club, Mendi played a total of 59 games for Basel scoring a total of 5 goals. 30 of these games were in the Nationalliga A, 1 in the Swiss Cup, 2 in the UI Cup and 26 were friendly games. He scored 2 goals in the domestic league, the other 5 were scored during the test games.

Mendi moved on to İstanbulspor, but this did not work out and he transferred to Étoile Carouge. After a number of seasons with various amateur clubs Mendi retired from active football.

== Sources ==
- Rotblau: Jahrbuch Saison 2017/2018. Publisher: FC Basel Marketing AG. ISBN 978-3-7245-2189-1
- Die ersten 125 Jahre. Publisher: Josef Zindel im Friedrich Reinhardt Verlag, Basel. ISBN 978-3-7245-2305-5
- Verein "Basler Fussballarchiv" Homepage
