= Undercover Angel (film) =

- DVD cover
- Directed by: Bryan Michael Stoller
- Written by: Bryan Michael Stoller
- Produced by: Eric Abrahamson; Bryan Michael Stoller
- Starring: Yasmine Bleeth; Dean Winters; Emily Mae Young; James Earl Jones; Casey Kasem
- Cinematography: Bruce Alan Greene
- Edited by: Stephen Adrianson
- Music by: Greg Edmonson
- Release dates: May 16, 1999 (Canada); 2000 (US)
- Running time: 91 minutes
- Country: Canada
- Language: English

Undercover Angel, also known as Un vrai petit ange (French title in Canada), is a 1999 romantic comedy film written and directed by Bryan Michael Stoller and starring Yasmine Bleeth and Dean Winters.

It was released on DVD in the 10 Movie Kid's Pack Volume 3 by Echo Bridge Home Entertainment in 2011.

== Plot ==
The story begins with a mystery-suspense script that is being written by a man, Harrison, who is a struggling freelance author of up-and-coming pulp novels. During the middle of Harrison’s day that was going uneasy for him, he becomes the unwilling babysitter of a charming, charismatic, and precocious little six-year-old girl, Jenny, when her mother, Melissa (Lorraine Ansell), one of Harrison's former lovers whom he hasn't seen for several years, asks him to babysit because she needs to be out of town for several weeks.

Harrison is originally unenthusiastic about the arrangement, but soon he develops a tenderness for Jenny after spending time to get to know her. Little Jenny decides to play matchmaker for Harrison and Holly, a beautiful woman he admires who frequently visits the same coffee shop as Harrison and Jenny.

Harrison tells stories for Jenny about Mr. Dodo—her favorite stuffed animal. Jenny secretly records them and gets Holly to transcribe the books, and they submit them to his publisher. Harrison accidentally discovers that he is Jenny's father after he views Jenny's birth certificate. Jenny's mother returns early and takes her away. Harrison tries to find a job in order to have financial stability and be eligible for custody of Jenny. Harrison tries to get custody of Jenny instead of her uncaring mother. The publisher contacts and contracts him for the Mr. Dodo series, which becomes a publishing success. Despite this, the judge grants custody to Melissa. After the hearing, Melissa and Jenny had an argument in which Jenny is slapped, causing her to cry and run to her room. However, Melissa later realizes that she was wrong and returns Jenny to Harrison. The scene ends with Jenny, Holly and Harrison at the bookstore signing autographs to the kids.

During the 'end credits', Mr. Dodo waves to the audience.

== Cast ==
- Yasmine Bleeth as Holly Anderson
- Dean Winters as Harrison Tyler
- Emily Mae Young as Jenny Morrison
- James Earl Jones as The Judge
- Casey Kasem as himself
- Lorraine Ansell as Melissa Morrison
- Richard Eden as Fred
- David L. McCallum as Dan O'Donnel (Publisher)
- Don Quiring as Sullivan
- Carherine Knight as Mrs. Stevens
- Leslie Rohonoczy as Receptionist Beth
- Carole Stoller as Mrs. Olend
- Malcolm Younger as Go-Cart Bob
- Rob Goyette as Table Guy Robbie
- Carmen as Stenographer
- Cory Sanford as Go-Cart Bystander
- Colin Brennan as Boy In Purple Shirt At Chapters
- Yves Fournier as Car Dealership interviewer

== Production ==
- Most of the film was shot on location in Ottawa, Ontario, Canada in July and August 1998. Some of the locations were the Canal Ritz Restaurant, Thunderbird Mini-golf and Go-Karts, The Supreme Court of Canada, and the Chapters location at the Pinecrest Shopping Centre. The scenes featuring Casey Kasem were filmed in a studio at CTV Ottawa.
- A scene was scheduled to be filmed with Jim Varney but was cancelled due to Yasmine Bleeth's agent refusing to allow her to be in a movie with him. Ultimately his part was played by a local actor in Ottawa as head of the go-kart track.
- Jay Leno was in talks to play the talk show host, but Casey Kasem ended up filling the role.
- The Ottawa Citizen had an ad to find extras for the film. Anyone interested was asked to write a short letter and fax it in. From those, extras were chosen for filming throughout the film.
- Glen Kulka, former football player and wrestler, moonlighted as security on the set.
- A film premiere was held at the Coliseum Theatres on Carling Avenue the year after filming. Bryan Michael Stoller and Emily Mae Young were in attendance.

== Reception ==
The Canadian website Media Film assessed the film as follows: "TV film recycling worn-out recipes without much effort. Routine direction. Average acting." while El País described it as "A typical sentimental exercise targeting the usual audience." A review at Dove.org stated: "This movie is a charming story of love and romance, along with the bond that grows between a father and a daughter. In today’s world there are many children that don’t find the closeness to one parent or the other."
