= Sébastien Barberis =

Swiss footballer (born 1972)

Personal information
- Full name: Sébastien Barberis
- Date of birth: 31 May 1972 (age 54)
- Place of birth: Sion, Switzerland
- Height: 1.75 m (5 ft 9 in)
- Positions: Defender; right winger

Senior career*
Years	Team	Apps	(Gls)
1990–1992	ES Malley	42	(6)
1992–1993	Lausanne Sports	4	(0)
1993–1997	Servette FC	111	(12)
1997–2005	FC Basel	224	(16)
2005–2007	FC Bulle	49	(4)
- * Club domestic league appearances and goals

Sébastien Barberis (born 31 May 1972) is a Swiss retired footballer who played mainly as defender or right winger.

== Football career ==
Barberis started his football career with ES Malley in 1990 and then moved to Lausanne Sports in 1992 before moving to Servette FC one year later. After four seasons with Servette he moved to Swiss giants FC Basel in 1997.

Barberis joined Basel's first team for their 1997–98 season under head coach Jörg Berger. After playing in five test games, Barberis played his domestic league debut for his new club in the away game in the Olympique de la Pontaise on 9 July 1997 as Basel were beaten 0–3 by Lausanne-Sport. He scored his first goal for the club on 13 September that year, in the away game in the Hardturm as Basel lost 2–3 against Grasshopper Club.

Between the years 1997 and 2005 Barberis played a total of 416 games for Basel scoring a total of 28 goals. 223 of these games were in the Nationalliga A, later called Super League, 20 in the Swiss Cup, 39 in the UEFA competitions (Champions League, UEFA cup and UIC) and 134 were friendly games. He scored 16 goal in the domestic league, two in the Cup and the other 10 were scored during the test games. With Basel he won three Swiss league titles and two Swiss Cups as well as progressing to the Second Group Stage of the UEFA Champions League.

Then in 2005, he signed for 1. Liga side FC Bulle on a free transfer. He retired from his active playing career at the end of the 2006/07 season.

== Personal life ==
Barberis is of Italian descent through his father. He is the son of the former Switzerland international footballer Umberto Barberis.

== Sources ==
- Rotblau: Jahrbuch Saison 2017/2018. Publisher: FC Basel Marketing AG. ISBN 978-3-7245-2189-1
- Die ersten 125 Jahre. Publisher: Josef Zindel im Friedrich Reinhardt Verlag, Basel. ISBN 978-3-7245-2305-5
- Verein "Basler Fussballarchiv" Homepage
