= Jürgen Hartmann =

German footballer

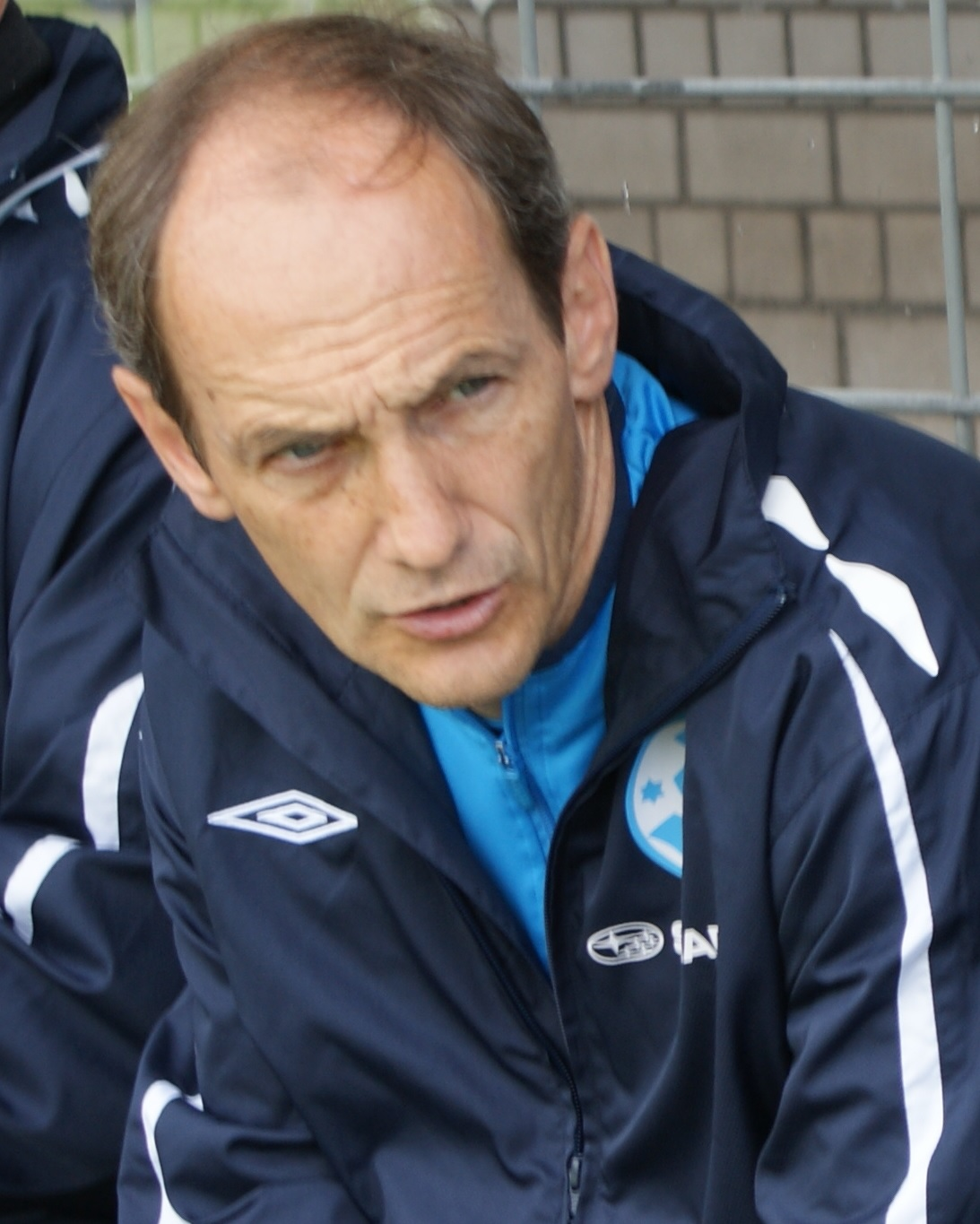
- Hartmann in 2013

Personal information
- Date of birth: 27 October 1962 (age 64)
- Place of birth: Lahr, West Germany
- Height: 1.81 m (5 ft 11 in)
- Position: Midfielder

Senior career*
| Years | Team | Apps | (Gls) |
| 1985–1991 | VfB Stuttgart | 174 | (10) |
| 1991–1997 | Hamburger SV | 189 | (7) |
| 1997–1998 | FC Basel | 28 | (0) |
| Total | | 384 | (17) |

Managerial career
- 2006–2007: Offenburger FV
- 2007: Alemannia Aachen (assistant)
- 2009–2010: Sonnenhof Großaspach
- 2012–2014: Stuttgarter Kickers II
- 2012–2013: Stuttgarter Kickers (assistant)
- 2013: Stuttgarter Kickers (interim)
- 2026: SC Sand
- * Club domestic league appearances and goals

Jürgen Hartmann (born 27 October 1962) is a German football coach and former player. A midfielder, he played during the 1980s and 1990s, most notably for the Bundesliga clubs VfB Stuttgart and Hamburger SV.

== Career ==
Hartmann was born in Lahr. He began his professional career at VfB Stuttgart in 1985 and went on to play over 150 matches for the club before he left to join Hamburger SV in 1991. He played for Hamburger SV for six years, making almost 200 appearances.

Hartmann joined FC Basel's first team for their 1997–98 season under head coach Jörg Berger. After playing in five test games Hartmann played his domestic league debut for his new club in the away game in the Olympique de la Pontaise on 9 July 1997 as Basel were defeated 0–3 by Lausanne-Sport. In the first half of the season (qualifying round) Hartmann was a regular in the starting eleven, missing just one game due to a suspension. During the second part of the season (promotion/relegation section) under new head coach Guy Mathez Hartmann played only half the games. At the beginning of the next season Hartmann could not set himself through and retired from his active playing career. During his time with the club Hartmann played a total of 46 games for Basel scoring one goal. 28 of these games were in the Nationalliga A, one in the Swiss Cup and 17 were friendly games. The goal was scored as Basel beat APOP Paphos 5–1 during the teams trainings camp in Cyprus.

In August 2007, Hartmann became assistant manager to Guido Buchwald at Alemannia Aachen. He then became the manager of SG Sonnenhof Großaspach in 2009. In 2012 he signed as coach for Stuttgarter Kickers II.

== Honours ==
- UEFA Cup finalist: 1988–89
- DFB-Pokal finalist: 1985–86

== Sources ==
- Rotblau: Jahrbuch Saison 2017/2018. Publisher: FC Basel Marketing AG. ISBN 978-3-7245-2189-1
- Die ersten 125 Jahre. Publisher: Josef Zindel im Friedrich Reinhardt Verlag, Basel. ISBN 978-3-7245-2305-5
- Verein "Basler Fussballarchiv" Homepage
