= Václav Pěchouček =

Czech footballer

Personal information
- Date of birth: 17 October 1978 (age 48)
- Position: Midfielder

Youth career
- until 1998: Viktoria Plzeň

Senior career*
Years	Team	Apps	(Gls)
1998–1999	FC Basel	10	(1)
1999–2000	FC Baden	17	(0)
2000–2003	Viktoria Plzeň		
2003–2008	FC Naters		
2008	FC Biel-Bienne		
2008–2009	SC Düdingen		
2009–2011	FC Wettswil-Bonstetten		
2011–2012	FC Küssnacht		
- * Club domestic league appearances and goals

Václav Pěchouček (born 5 March 1979) is a retired Czech football midfielder.

Pěchouček played his youth football by Viktoria Plzeň. He moved to Switzerland and joined FC Basel's first team during the winter break of their 1997–98 season under head coach Guy Mathez. Pěchouček played his domestic league debut for the club in the away game in the Stade de la Maladière on 2 May 1998 as Basel were 1–2 by Xamax. He scored his first goal for his club one week later on 9 May in the home game in the St. Jakob Stadium as Basel won 4–1 against Young Boys. He stayed with the club until the end of the following season. During this time Pěchouček played a total of 23 games for Basel scoring just that one goal. 10 of these games were in the Nationalliga A, one in the Swiss Cup and 12 were friendly games.

After his time with Basel, Pěchouček played one season with FC Baden before he returned to his club of origin Viktoria Plzeň. He played with them for three seasons and then returned to Switzerland. In 2003 Pěchouček signed for FC Naters and played with them for four and a half seasons. He played for four other semi-pro and amateur clubs before ending his active career in 2012.

== Sources ==
- Rotblau: Jahrbuch Saison 2017/2018. Publisher: FC Basel Marketing AG. ISBN 978-3-7245-2189-1
- Die ersten 125 Jahre. Publisher: Josef Zindel im Friedrich Reinhardt Verlag, Basel. ISBN 978-3-7245-2305-5
- Verein "Basler Fussballarchiv" Homepage
