= Dinoshark =

- DVD cover
- Written by: Frances Doel; Guy Prevost
- Directed by: Kevin O'Neill
- Starring: Eric Balfour
- Theme music composer: Cynthia Brown
- Country of origin: United States
- Original language: English

Production
- Producers: Roger Corman; Julie Corman
- Cinematography: Eduardo Flores Torres
- Editors: Vikram Kale; Olena Kuhtaryeva
- Running time: 90 minutes
- Budget: $2,000,000 (estimated)

Original release
- Network: Syfy
- Release: March 13, 2010

Dinoshark is a 2010 low budget horror film produced by Syfy. It was shown on Syfy on March 13, 2010. A spin-off and it is the third installment in the Dinocroc film series.

== Background ==
The film premiered on Syfy on the evening of March 13, 2010 before 2 million viewers. Dinoshark followed up Dinocroc; Roger Corman proposed a sequel (Dinocroc 2) but Syfy felt that television audiences tended to respond better to new-but-similar ideas more than direct sequels. April MacIntyre, of Monsters and Critics, compared the film to old B movies. A sequel titled Dinocroc vs. Supergator was released on June 26, 2010. Roger Corman said that while the plot is hard to believe, the film can be enjoyed if disbelief is suspended and that the film is internally consistent.

Dinoshark has been described as Dinocroc with flippers. Before the film was released, Margaret Lyons of Entertainment Weekly said that this, along with Sharktopus, were destined to be classics of the "awesomely awful made-for-TV movie genre".

== Plot ==
The film opens with aquatic reptil infants swimming away from a broken chunk of Arctic glacier that calved due to global warming. Three years later, one is a ferocious predatory adult and kills tourists and locals offshore from Puerto Vallarta, Mexico. The protagonist, Trace, is first to notice the creature and witnesses his friend get eaten, but has trouble convincing people that a creature of such antiquity is still alive and eating people.

== Cast ==
- Eric Balfour as Trace McGraw
- Iva Hasperger as Carol Brubaker
- Aarón Díaz as Luis
- Roger Corman as Dr. Reeves
- Blythe Metz as Newscaster
- Vela Hammond as Mag
- Blanche Wheeler as Dani
- Shaun Carson as David
- Jenna Manger as Ali

== Reception ==
Critics and reviewers tended to share similar views on the nature of the film, seeing it as a continuation in the tradition of older B movie horror/monster films, with the implausible plots, stock sequences and questionable acting typical of that genre.

Critics were divided between those who felt this made it highly entertaining and those who felt this made the film exceptionally poor in quality and panned it for its lack of redeeming features. In both cases though, critics conceded that it stood a chance of becoming a classic of its kind, if for nothing else than for a level of awfulness that mandated watching. April Macintyre of Monsters and critics gave it a positive review. Referring to "fun films, laced with implausible plots, brilliant poster art and laughable dialogue [that] demanded that you show up ready to suspend disbelief, prepare for a scare and always left the audience entertained", she wrote that some aspects are "hilariously over the top. Think Al Pacino's Cuban accent in Scarface times ten", but concluded that in the context of its genre, "we wouldn't want it any other way."

On the negative side, Dread Central was condemnatory of the "rubbery" monster, "exceptionally chintzy" effects, and "some of the worst acting ever seen in a Syfy original movie", concluding that users who did not regularly watch "schlocky shark flicks" would probably enjoy laughing at "this silly offering in which half the cast sound like they were voiced over by George Lopez". Chicago Now gave it one star out of 5 as a "low-budget joker" and "cheesy, mindless fun", stating there had to be a "fun drinking game" in it and the best thing about it was the title.

== Home video ==
Dinoshark was released on DVD and Blu-ray on April 26, 2011.

== See also ==
- List of killer shark films
