= Kevin Scott Allen =

American actor (born 1964)

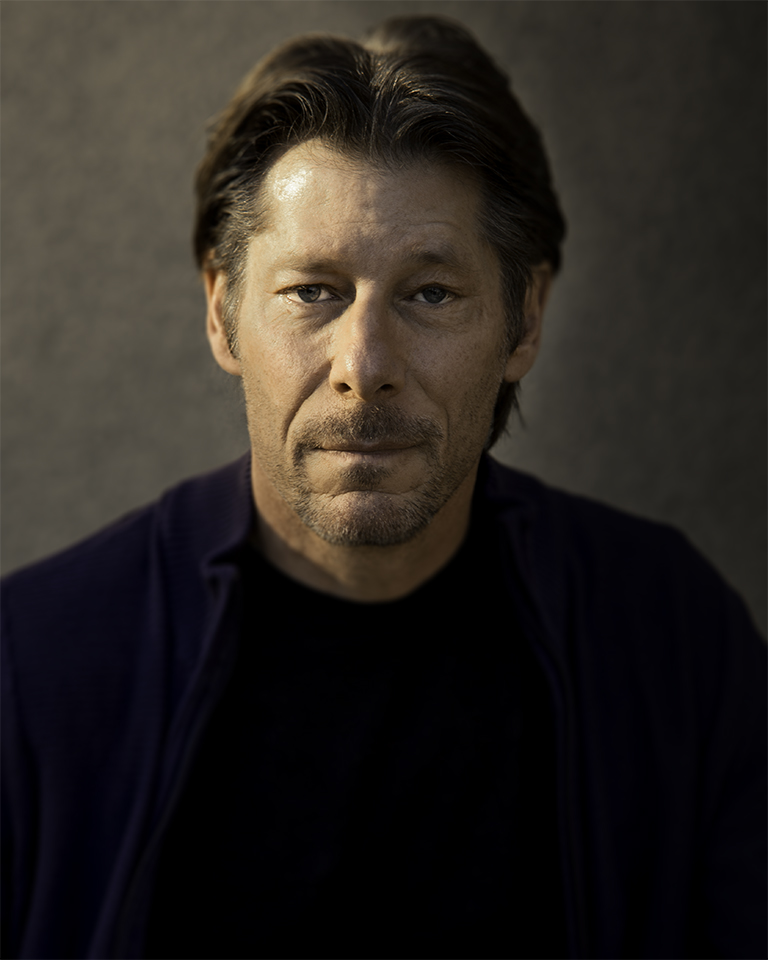

Kevin Scott Allen (born 20 March 1964) is an American stage, film, and television actor.

== Early life and career ==
Born in Washington, D.C., Allen grew up in California, Virginia, North Carolina, and New Jersey. He was educated at the Hun School of Princeton and Collège Champittet in Switzerland, where he learnt to speak French fluently, and then studied theatre and dramatic arts at the University of Redlands, California.

In 1979, at the Globe Theatre on Broadway, Allen played Buckingham in Henry VI, Part 2 and Clifford in Henry VI, Part 3. An early television appearance came in the Otherworld episode “The Zone Troopers Build Men” (1985).

== Films ==
- Little Heroes, Part 3 (2002)
- Le Petoname: Parti Avec (2005) as Dr Baudouin
- Abe and Bruno (2006) as Sheriff Kilgore
- Charlie Valentine (2009) as Marko
- About Scout (2015) as Ride Operator
- Stalked by My Mother (TV movie, 2016), as Nick Fox
- Puppet Master: Axis Termination (2017) as Sturmbannführer
- In Full Bloom (2019) as Vincent Warren

== Theatre ==
- Henry VI, Part 2 (Globe Theatre, Broadway, Los Angeles, 1979), as Buckingham
- Henry VI, Part 3 (Globe Theatre, Broadway, Los Angeles, 1979), as Clifford
- In a Northern Landscape (1983) by Timothy Mason (Cast-at-the-Circle Theatre, Hollywood)
- Romeo and Juliet (West Coast Ensemble, 1992), as Romeo
- Angels Twice Descending (Hudson Theatre, 1995)
- Electricity (Two Roads Theatre)
- Martin: Duty Calls by Roy Parker (Acme Theatre, 2018)
- Dr. Anonymous (Zephyr Theatre, 2014)
- Dreambook (Los Angeles Theatre Center)
- The King and I (Wolf Trap Theatre)

== Television ==
    - American Primeval (2025) as Louis
- Bearcats! (1971) as Town boy
- Otherworld: The Zone Troopers Build Men (1985) as Brindle
- Homefront (1991–1993) as Ed
- Star Trek: Deep Space Nine, "What You Leave Behind" (1999) as Jem’Hadr
- Alias (2005) as French Policeman
- Prison Break (2009) as Inmate
- Famously Afraid (2019) as Ty Pennington
- Extreme Measures (2019) as Older Tom Egley
- Station 19 (2020) as Henry
- American Primeval (2025) as Louis

== Publication ==
- Kevin Scott Allen, Conquering the Film and Television Audition (CreateSpace Independent Publishing, 2015)
