= Jennings Michael Burch =

American writer and author (1941 – 2013)

- Born: April 27, 1941; Manhattan, New York
- Died: January 15, 2013 (aged 71); Carmel, New York
- Education: John Jay College
- Occupation: Writer
- Writing career
- Notable work: They Cage the Animals At Night

Jennings Michael Burch (April 27, 1941 – January 15, 2013) was an American writer and author of the 1984 best-selling autobiography They Cage the Animals At Night.

== Early life and education ==
Jennings Michael Burch was born in the South Bronx, New York and spent most of his childhood in foster homes. Burch's mother, a single parent, first placed her children in foster care in 1949, when Jennings was eight and a half. Between 1949 and 1954, Burch stayed in 32 foster homes, moved with his family three times, and stayed with at least three sets of foster parents. He also lost his biological brother Jerome, whom he hardly knew.

He earned a B.A. in forensic psychology from John Jay College in Manhattan, New York City, New York.

== Career ==
He worked as a New York City policeman, a chauffeur, a theater manager, a magazine pressman, and a short-order cook.

== Personal life ==
Burch was married three times. He had two biological daughters (first marriage), one adopted daughter, (second marriage) and a son (third marriage).
