= Abe & Bruno =

- Directed by: Henri Charr
- Written by: Henri Charr; Jess Mancilla; Sree Scanda
- Produced by: Jess Mancilla
- Starring: Kevin Scott Allen; Blythe Metz
- Cinematography: Arnold Peterson
- Music by: Patrick Kirst
- Distributed by: Harmony Gold USA
- Release date: January 2006
- Running time: 95 minutes
- Country: United States
- Language: English
- Budget: $1M

Abe & Bruno is a 2006 American family film directed by Henri Charr and starring Kevin Scott Allen and Blythe Metz.

The film was released on DVD in 2014.

== Outline ==
Abe (Brad Sergi) is living in a cabin in the woods with his friend, a mountain gorilla, Bruno, stolen from a zoo. After scaring off some children who were on his property, Abe has a heart attack and collapses. Bruno then sets out for the nearest village to get help, but is considered dangerous.

Sheriff Kilgore (Kevin Scott Allen) leads a posse to capture Bruno, and the men arrive at Abe's cabin in time to save Abe, but Bruno remains on the run. Kilgore's men set bear traps to catch him. Sara (Blythe Metz), a reporter for Zoo TV, discovers Bruno's real identity, and the law is now after him in earnest, to return him to the zoo.

== Cast ==
- Brad Sergi as Abe
- Kevin Scott Allen as Sheriff Kilgore
- Blythe Metz as Sara
- Noah Crawford as Shawn
- Mario Luna as TV news reporter
- Eric Clarke as Reporter
- Darla Coele as Lounge Singer
- Jorden Davis as Brandon
- Gregory Franklin as Dr. Field
- Nadia Lieb as Wendy
- Candice Rose as Edie
- Maile Stone as Cowboy's daughter
- Janet Vincent Lee as TV News Reporter
- David McCoy as Man Chased by Gorilla

== Reception ==
The Dove Foundation said of the film, as released on DVD:

Abe and Bruno is a fun family movie with its serious side and humorous side. It is charming movie but unfortunately due to some language we cannot approve this film.

Another reviewer notes that Abe and Bruno are roommates and best friends, "one is a neat freak, the other a regular slob". Abe is the one considered a slob.

The DVD Talk review said:

The story involves a weepy old bearded man named Abe who lives comfortably in a home in the middle of the forest with a gorilla (clearly a guy in a gorilla suit) named Bruno... Abe and Bruno is quite simply a laughably bad kid flick with weak attempts at humor...stilted acting and even worse directing (people are fleeing and smiling instead of fleeing in terror in one scene). Basically, anything that can go wrong in a film does here.
