= Vladimir Martinović =

Serbian footballer

Personal information
- Full name: Vladimir Martinović
- Date of birth: 6 April 1973 (age 53)
- Place of birth: Zemun, SFR Yugoslavia
- Position: Defender

Youth career
- Partizan

Senior career*
Years	Team	Apps	(Gls)
1994–1997	Zemun	45	(8)
1997–2000	Neuchâtel Xamax	70	(15)
2000–2001	Baden	32	(5)
2001–2002	Vojvodina	9	(0)
2001–2003	Wohlen	34	(6)
2003–2004	Rapperswil-Jona		
2004–2007	Tuggen	82	(6)
2008–2011	Seefeld Zürich		

International career
1997	FR Yugoslavia	3	(0)
- * Club domestic league appearances and goals

Vladimir Martinović (Serbian Cyrillic: Владимир Мартиновић; born 6 April 1973) is a Serbian footballer.

Martinović earned three caps for FR Yugoslavia, all of them during the 1997 Korea Cup.
