= Denis Duchosal =

Swiss footballer (born 1971)

Personal information
- Date of birth: 16 August 1971 (age 55)
- Height: 1.82 m (6 ft 0 in)
- Position: Midfielder

Senior career*
| Years | Team | Apps | (Gls) |
| 1990–1996 | Servette | | |
| 1995 | → CS Chênois (loan) | | |
| 1996–1998 | Étoile Carouge | | |
| 1998–2000 | Meyrin | | |
- * Club domestic league appearances and goals

Denis Duchosal (born 16 August 1971) is a Swiss former professional footballer who played as a midfielder.
