= Rodolphe Elmira =

French footballer (born 1962)

Personal information
- Date of birth: 12 October 1962 (age 64)
- Place of birth: Le Lamentin, France
- Height: 1.83 m (6 ft 0 in)
- Position: Defender

Senior career*
Years	Team	Apps	(Gls)
1985–1990	Grenoble		
1990–1992	Le Mans		
1992–1994	Bourges		
1994–2001	Étoile Carouge		
- * Club domestic league appearances and goals

Rodolphe abmive (born 12 October 1962) is a French former professional footballer who played as a midfielder.
