= Nightmare Man (film) =

- Poster for Nightmare Man
- Directed by: Rolfe Kanefsky
- Written by: Rolfe Kanefsky
- Produced by: Esther Goodstein; Rolfe Kanefsky; Victor Kanefsky; Frederico Lapenda
- Starring: Gwen Davis; Robert Donovan; James Ferris; Blythe Metz; Richard Moll; Hanna Putnam; Tiffany Shepis; Aaron Sherry; Jack Sway; Luciano Szafir
- Cinematography: Paul Deng
- Edited by: Victor Kanefsky
- Music by: Christopher Farrell
- Release date: August 4, 2006
- Running time: 109 minutes
- Country: United States
- Language: English

Nightmare Man is a 2006 horror film written and directed by Rolfe Kanefsky. It was produced by Paradigm Pictures, a division of Paradigm Entertainment Group, and Frederico Lapenda.

== Plot ==
Ellen believes there is a supernatural creature named the "Nightmare Man" trying to kill her. However, her husband and doctors believe she is a paranoid schizophrenic.

On the way to a psychiatric ward, Morris' car breaks down. When her husband goes to get gas, Ellen stays behind and is attacked by the mysterious, horrifying enemy, the Nightmare Man. Escaping into the nearby woods, Ellen stumbles upon a country house where two young couples are spending the weekend. They do not know if the killer is real or just a figment of Ellen's tortured mind, nor if the killer is outside or already inside the house.

As people start dying, nobody knows whom they can trust. Near the end of the film, the killer is revealed to be a hitman hired by Ellen's husband to kill Ellen before she discovers his affairs. Ellen reveals she is possessed by the real Nightmare Man, a demon who enters a female body first by getting them to wear his mask, then he rapes them. As the Nightmare Man, she kills the hitman and her husband. She sets her sights on Mia, the survivor, who kills Ellen, but is stripped and raped by the Nightmare Man's spirit. She is left in an institution, where the doctor decides to take her off her medication, which are the only things that keep the demon asleep.

== Cast ==
- Blythe Metz as Ellen
- Tiffany Shepis as Mia
- Luciano Szafir as William
- Johanna Putnam as Trinity
- James Ferris as Jack
- Jack Sway as Ed
- Aaron Sherry as The Nightmare Man
- Richard Moll as Captain McCormack
- Gwen Davis as Officer Simmons
- Robert Donavan as Dr. Evans
- Victor Kanefsky as Officer Val
- Alice Glenn as Officer Kan

== Release ==
The film was completed in 2006. That same year, it screened at film festivals, such as the Shriekfest horror film festival in Hollywood, and it played for one week in a regular engagement at a theatre in West Hollywood. However, it did not receive actual distribution until it was picked up to be part of the 2007 After Dark Horror Fest, which annually releases eight independent horror films nationwide.
