= Bryan Michael Stoller =

Canadian film director

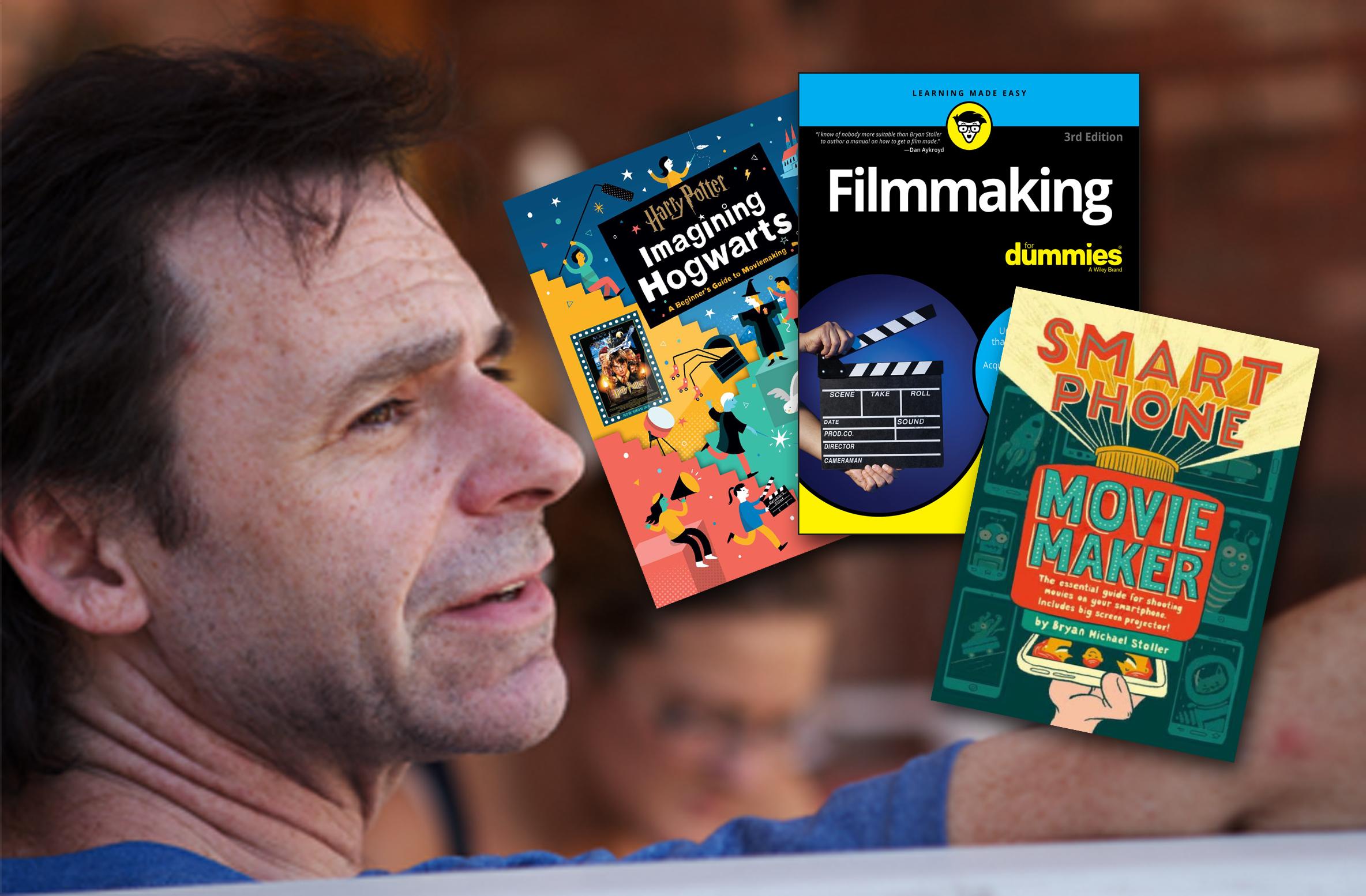
- Stoller in 2023
- Born: Peterborough, Ontario, Canada
- Occupation: Independent filmmaker
- Years active: 1970–present
- Parents: David Stoller; Carole Stoller
- Website: bryanmichaelstoller.com

Bryan Michael Stoller (born 1960) is a Canadian independent filmmaker whose films include First Dog, The Amazing Wizard of Paws, Santa Stole Our Dog, (Universal) Turn of the Blade, The Random Factor, Miss Cast Away and the Island Girls, Undercover Angel, and Light Years Away.

== Biography ==
His childhood hobbies included magic tricks and clay animation. His dad attempted to convince Bryan to pursue a different career; later, his dad said he was proud of Stoller's career. As a teen, he earned multiple Film Awards: a gold award in "Film Magic" at The Festival of the Americas (1978), a bronze medal at the Miami International Film Festival for a super documentary (1979), and Best Youth Film at the Canadian International Amateur Film Festival (1979). When Bryan was twelve years old he hosted a national children's show on the CBC (Canadian Broadcasting Company) called "Film Fun" showing pre-teens how to make their own super-8 movies.

After producing commercials for local businesses, he moved to Los Angeles at 19 when he was selected as a Director Fellow at the American Film Institute Later he earned a role dusting the Hulk, Lou Ferrigno on The Incredible Hulk TV series when he crashed through a wall.

Stoller said he prefers directing to producing because he enjoys the creative aspect. He has also acted briefly, making a few cameos in his productions and starring in a short A Canadian Werewolf in Hollywood, a parody of American Werewolf in London where he transforms into a werewolf in the middle of a call and uses his wolf side to produce a film. A Canadian Werewolf in Hollywood and other spoofs Stoller directed were packaged into a movie called Undershorts: The Movie for Paramount Home Video.

Other shorts in Undershorts: The Movie received attention from celebrities parodied by them. The Incredible Bulk, a parody of The Incredible Hulk TV series, included Lou Ferrigno from the TV show reprising his role as the Hulk. "The Shadow of Michael", a parody of a Pepsi commercial caught Jackson's attention, and Jackson reprised his minor character Agent MJ from Men in Black II in Stoller's feature film parody titled Miss Cast Away and the Island Girls, later re-released as Silly Movie 2.

Jackson and Stoller were planning to release a new movie called They Cage the Animals at Night prior to Jackson's death. Jackson's estate was not aware there was a formal deal for the movie, as Jackson didn't have a management team at the time he discussed the movie—though there was a contractual agreement drafted and signed through Jackson's attorneys. Stoller was interviewed after Jackson's death to talk about his friendship. Stoller noted that Jackson seemed frail prior to his death and said he didn't believe allegations against Jackson.

Stoller adopted a dog named Little Bear. The dog was previously fostered by former president Ronald Reagan and first lady Nancy Reagan. Stoller met Nancy Reagan, which inspired him to create the movie First Dog starring Little Bear as the First Dog who gets lost, and found by a foster kid.

Stoller has also coached filmmakers and actors and written the coaching books Filmmaking for Dummies and Harry Potter: Imagining Hogwarts, and Smartphone Movie Maker. Stoller has accomplished a feat that most independent filmmakers have not achieved; his movies UnderCover Angel and Wizard of Paws amassed close to eighteen million views on AVOD without any advertising—word of mouth only.

Stoller's films have appeared on almost every modern platform, including Netflix, Amazon Prime, HBO, FOX, ABC, NBC, CBS and in syndication.

== Selected filmography ==
=== Films ===
Year	Title	As	Notes
1971	Film Fun	Writer, Director, Producer, Co-Host	
1975	Vampire of Woodroffe High School	Writer, Director, Producer	
1977	Just Like Magic	Writer, Director, Producer	
1987	Undershorts: The Movie	Writer, Director, Producer	Appears as himself in the short "A Canadian Werewolf in Hollywood" and as a robber in the short "The Incredible Bulk"
1994	Turn of the Blade	Director, Writer (story), Producer	Cameo appearance as "Stroller couple."
1995	The Random Factor	Director, Writer, Producer	Cameo appearance as "Van Passenger."
1996	Dragon Fury II	Director	
1999	Undercover Angel	Director, Writer, Producer.	Cameo appearance as "Speedy Messenger."
2004	Miss Cast Away	Director, Writer, Producer	Cameo appearance as "Courier"; Featuring Michael Jackson.
2007	Light Years Away	Director, Writer, Producer	
2010	First Dog	Director, Writer, Producer.	(Also editor and music supervisor) Cameo appearance as "Letter Carrier Paul"; Featuring original songs by Dolly Parton
2014	The Amazing Wizard of Paws	writer, producer, director, editor	
2017	Santa Stole Our Dog	writer, producer, director, editor	Starring Ed Asner as Santa Claus

=== Television ===
Television and film roles
Year	Title	Role	Notes
1986	Tales from the Darkside	Director	Episode: "The Bitterest Pill"
1999	Animal Crackers	Writer	Season 3

== Bibliography ==
- Stoller, Bryan Michael, Filmmaking for Dummies (2003) ISBN 0470386940
- "Smartphone Moviemaking"
- "Harry Potter: Imagining Hogwarts" a guide to movie making.
