= Blythe Metz =

American actress

Blythe Laura Metz (born 1977), also known as Blythe Metz-Mändmets, is an American actress and writer.

== Life ==
Metz was educated at Arizona State University, graduating BA in performing arts in 2000. An early screen role was as a beauty Queen in Miss Cast Away and the Island Girls (2004), and her first lead parts were Jacqueline Hyde (2005) and Nightmare Man (2006).

Lynda Carter proposed Catherine Zeta-Jones, Cindy Crawford, and Metz as candidates for the role of Wonder Woman.

As a vlogger, Metz has sparked controversy by claims on her YouTube channel about natural treatments for cancer. In a video with over 600,000 views, she says "There are alternatives that have been sacked because they are a threat to this multi-trillion dollar business."

== Filmography ==
=== Film ===
Year	Title	Role	Notes
2002	Leather and Iron	Misty	
2002	Training Wheels	-	
2004	Miss Cast Away and the Island Girls	Miss Delaware	TV movie
2004	Lights and Darks	Young Wife	Short
2005	Jacqueline Hyde	Jacqueline Hyde	Video
2005	Fastback	Rose	
2005	Faceless	The Girl	Short
2006	Abe & Bruno	Sara	TV movie
2006	Bred in the Bone	Gigi Andrews	
2006	The Craving Heart	Walela	
2006	Nightmare Man	Ellen	
2006	The Thirst	Sasha	
2007	I Love You Mommy	Mommy	Short
2007	Everyone's a Victor	Roxanne	Short
2008	Surviving	Vivian	Short
2008	It's All a Game	Hosie	Short
2009	Fool's Dream	Karen	
2010	Dinoshark	TV Newscaster	
2010	Creed	Andrea Mills	
2012	Perception	Athena	
2013	The Joint	Carla	
2014	101: Modern Los Angeles Vampires	-	
2014	Lost Angels	Mimi	
2017	Love Is...	Jessica (Painter)	

== Awards ==
- Action on Film International Film Festival 2005, Best Actress, for Bred in the Bone (2006)
