= Miss Cast Away and the Island Girls =

- DVD cover
- Directed by: Bryan Michael Stoller
- Written by: Bryan Michael Stoller
- Produced by: Jeff Assofsky; Gloria Pryor; Bryan Michael Stoller
- Starring: Eric Roberts; Charlie Schlatter; Evan Marriott; Stuart Pankin; Joyce Giraud; Michael Jackson
- Cinematography: Bryan England
- Edited by: Michael Murphy
- Music by: Greg Edmonson
- Production company: Island Productions
- Distributed by: Showcase Entertainment
- Release dates: April 22, 2004 (WorldFest Houston); July 26, 2005 (United States)
- Running time: 90 minutes
- Country: United States
- Language: English
- Budget: $2 million

Miss Cast Away and the Island Girls (also known as Miss Cast Away and as Silly Movie 2, as titled for re-release in 2008) is a 2004 American parody anarchic comedy film written and directed by Bryan Michael Stoller, produced on a $2 million budget. It features Michael Jackson in his final scripted film performance before his death in 2009,, as a character who has been assigned by the Vatican to manipulate the castaways for the Vatican's own purposes.

== Cast ==
- Eric Roberts as Captain Maximus Powers
- Charlie Schlatter as Mike Saunders
- Joyce Giraud as Julie
- Stuart Pankin as Noah
- Evan Marriott as Joe Millionaire
- Michael Jackson as Agent M.J.
- Eugene Greytak as Your Holiness (as Gene Greytak)
- Richard Halpern as Groovy Guy
- Colleen Shannon as Miss Texas
- Blythe Metz as Miss Delaware
- Jackie Torres as Miss Congenial
- Allie Moss as Miss Nevada
- Janna Giacoppo as Miss Canada
- Popi Ardissone as Miss Nebraska
- Charity Rock as Miss Kentucky

=== Cameo appearances ===
Director Bryan Michael Stoller was able to get famous actors, such as Pat Morita and Bernie Kopell, to appear in cameo roles for the movie.

== Film production and release ==
Bryan Michael Stoller was given permission to shoot Michael Jackson's scenes at Neverland Ranch. He later said that while it was exciting to be given such a rare privilege, it presented its disruptions to the filming process at times. In an MTV interview, he said:

"It's his home. It's all normal to him that there's a train running around the property tooting its horn," the director recalled of a noisy interruption that appears among the DVD's bonus features. "[Another time] his staff brought us soup, so we were sipping soup and talking, and these two elephants walk by outside. Michael's continuing to sip his soup like a fly flew by, and I turn to Michael and look at him and he's not even acknowledging the elephants."

Miss Cast Away and the Island Girls was due to be released in theaters in the summer of 2004, but Jackson's legal problems during that time made the movie's distributors wary of releasing the movie. Director Stoller explained in a news release, "We've sort of had to put things on hold. It's a shame because Jackson has an amazing vision." The film's release date was also thrown into doubt due to worries of executives at 20th Century Fox that the title was too close to Tom Hanks' hit film Cast Away.

The film was shown in three film festivals during 2004, was shown on television in Russia in 2005, and was finally released to DVD in the United States in July 2005.

In July 2011, it was announced in a press release that the film would have its world premiere on My Family TV, Retro Television Network, and Tuff TV in Fall 2011, followed by a special limited DVD release featuring 20 minutes of unreleased footage of Jackson's involvement in the film. Curiously, the press release did not mention the film by name, only that it was falsely described as "Michael Jackson's last movie" (while this film was Jackson's last scripted appearance, his actual last movie was his concert film, Michael Jackson's This Is It, in 2009). The press release only gave away the fact that it was Miss Cast Away and the Island Girls by its description: "The film is a comedy that spoofs movies and television programs like Miss Congeniality, Planet of the Apes, Cast Away, The Love Boat, Gilligan's Island, The Sixth Sense, Jurassic Park, Men in Black, and more. Michael Jackson plays the role of Agent MJ. Jackson's scenes were shot at his Neverland Ranch home."
