= There's Nothing Out There =

1992 film by Rolfe Kanefsky

- Film poster
- Directed by: Rolfe Kanefsky
- Written by: Rolfe Kanefsky
- Based on: Horror films
- Produced by: Victor Kanefsky
- Starring: Craig Peck; Wendy Bednarz; Mark Collver; John Carhart
- Cinematography: Ed Hershberger
- Edited by: Victor Kanefsky
- Music by: Christopher Thomas
- Production company: Prism Entertainment Corporation
- Distributed by: Image Entertainment; Troma Entertainment
- Release date: 1991
- Running time: 91 min.
- Country: United States
- Language: English
- Budget: $350,000

There's Nothing Out There is a 1991 comedy horror film directed by Rolfe Kanefsky and starring Craig Peck, Wendy Bednarz, and Mark Collver.

In the film, an extraterrestrial resembling a frog attempts to mate with unwilling teenage girls. A boy attempts to save the damsels-in-distress.

== Plot ==
A frog-like alien attacks a group of teenagers who are camping, to mate with the girls. A boy's horror film knowledge helps them fight against the monster.

== Production ==
Kanefsky directed this film when he was 20 years old. The film satirizes horror films, five years before Scream would be released. A review for DVD Verdict said that the difference between There's Nothing Out There and Scream is that the first film is a comedy, while the other film can stand alone as a horror film. Various horror films are referenced, including Psycho.

There's Nothing Out There was filmed with 16 mm film, with the editing done on a Steenbeck. The film was finished in 1990 and was first released in 1991. After the film's success at the Independent Film Project film festival, they attempted to have a film studio release it. The director said of the film studios, "We had some important screenings, but the studios didn't understand the film. It was a horror film and a comedy that talked about horror films". He also compared his film to Scream.

It had a showing in New York City and Los Angeles, but no profit was made. The film rights were sold to Image Entertainment in 1992, and the company released the film on VHS and laser disc. The film aired on HBO and Cinemax in 1993.

== Reception ==
Reviewing the film in The New York Times, Janet Maslin wrote that Kanefsky's "intentions are good and his effects sometimes funny, but the whole film plays like exactly what it is, namely the work of a 20-year-old college student". She concluded that "Aside from Mr. Peck's comic timing and the cleverness of a few gags...not much about the film rises above amateurishness, but Mr. Kanefsky does show energy and promise."

Tom Becker, of DVD Verdict, concluded his review with, "A cool, if slightly loquacious, release from Troma, There's Nothing Out There is a fun little film that's worth checking out".

A review in VideoHound's Cult Flicks & Trash Pics said, "In general, this no-budget parody of screen schlock is barely better than the dreck it imitates".

== Home media ==
Image Entertainment released the film on VHS and laser disc in 1992. It was released on DVD in 2011 by Troma Entertainment.
