= Jörg Berger =

German footballer and manager

Personal information
- Date of birth: 13 October 1944
- Place of birth: Gotenhafen, Nazi Germany
- Date of death: 23 June 2010 (aged 65)
- Place of death: Duisburg, Germany
- Height: 1.80 m (5 ft 11 in)
- Position: Striker

Senior career*
Years	Team	Apps	(Gls)
1964–1970	1.FC Lok Leipzig		

Managerial career
- 1970–1972: Lok Leipzig II
- 1972–1974: Carl Zeiss Jena
- 1974–1976: Hallescher FC Chemie
- 1976–1978: East Germany U-19
- 1978–1979: East Germany U-21
- 1979–1980: Darmstadt 98
- 1980–1981: SSV Ulm
- 1981–1982: Fortuna Düsseldorf
- 1983–1986: KSV Hessen Kassel
- 1986: Hannover 96
- 1986–1988: SC Freiburg
- 1988–1991: Eintracht Frankfurt
- 1991–1993: 1. FC Köln
- 1993–1996: Schalke 04
- 1997: FC Basel
- 1997–1998: Karlsruher SC
- 1998–1999: Eintracht Frankfurt
- 2000: Bursaspor
- 2001–2004: Alemannia Aachen
- 2004–2005: Hansa Rostock
- 2009: Arminia Bielefeld
- * Club domestic league appearances and goals

Jörg Berger (13 October 1944 – 23 June 2010) was a German football manager and player, who last managed Arminia Bielefeld.

== Career ==
As an active he played for 1.FC Lok Leipzig.

== Coaching career ==
In 1970, Berger was forced to retire due to a muscle injury and started his managing career after the studying at the DHfK Leipzig. Berger was a reputable manager in East Germany who was planned to manage the national team as successor of longtime manager Georg Buschner some day.

Berger managed the youth team of the GDR. In 1979, he used a match in Yugoslavia to flee to West Germany. He signed with Second Bundesliga side SV Darmstadt 98. As a GDR refugee he suffered many threats by the East German secret police Stasi. He survived being poisoned whilst managing KSV Hessen Kassel in the mid-1980s. Evidence of the threats to his life were not available until 1990 when Germany was reunified, after which he was able to search his Stasi files.

He was renowned as a great motivator, helping clubs threatened with relegation, but with little chance to build up teams over a longer period. Berger became the ’’fireman’’ of the Bundesliga after he twice failed to gain promotion to the Bundesliga with KSV Hessen Kassel, ending up in fourth position in the Second division of the Bundesliga (1984 and 1985). His greatest achievements were two third positions with Eintracht Frankfurt in 1990 and with FC Schalke 04 in 1996. He was replaced as manager of Schalke by Huub Stevens in October 1996 shortly before they won the UEFA Cup in 1997.

Berger's last big success was reaching the DFB-Pokal final with Alemannia Aachen, a side from the Second division of the Bundesliga. However his contract was cancelled, by mutual agreement, after they lost to the then current champions (SV Werder Bremen) and failed to gain promotion to the Bundesliga.

From 17 November 2004 until 14 August 2005, he was the manager of FC Hansa Rostock. He was fired after a 1–4 defeat by TSV 1860 München. On 18 May 2009, was named as the new Head Coach from DSC Arminia Bielefeld. His contract ran until 30 June 2009. He left the club on this date.

== Personal life ==
Berger was the father of three children. In 2002, he had to interrupt his time as Alemannia Aachen manager due to an operation on an intestinal tumour. In 2005, he was operated on again, this time on liver metastasis. He released his biography "Meine zwei Halbzeiten: Ein Leben in Ost und West" (English: My Two Halves: A Life in the East and in the West) over the Leipzig based Rowohlt Verlag in March 2009. Berger died on 23 June 2010 of an enteric tumor.

== See also ==
- List of Soviet and Eastern Bloc defectors
