= 2000–01 FC Aarau season =

FC Aarau
2000–01 season
- Club president: Ernst Lämmli
- Head-coach: Rolf Fringer
- Stadium: Stadion Brügglifeld, Aarau
- 2000–01 NLA Qualifying phase: 9th of 12
- Promotion/relegation group NLA/NLB: 2nd of 8
- 2000–01 Swiss Cup: Round 5
- Top goalscorer: League: Olivier Baudry and Levan Khomeriki (both 9); All: Olivier Baudry and Levan Khomeriki (both 9)

The 2000–01 season was FC Aarau's 98th season in their existence, since their foundation in 1902. It was their nineteenth season in the top flight of Swiss football, following their promotion at the end of 1980–81 season. FCA played their home games in the Stadion Brügglifeld and the stadium is located on the southern outskirts of Aarau, in the territory of the neighboring municipality of Suhr. It is about one and a half kilometers from Aarau city center and the railway station.

== Overview ==
The local businessman and architect Ernst Lämmli was the club's president and patron at this time. He had taken over as chairman, as of the club's AGM in 1989. At the end of the previous season Lämmli and the club parted ways with the then existing head-coach Jochen Dries and had appointed a new head-coach in Rolf Fringer. Fringer had achieved the championsip with the club during the 1992–93 season and had been head-coach of the Swiss national football team during 1996 and 1997. Fringer continued as head-coach for the current season.

The FCA first team competed in this season's domestic first-tier 2000–01 Nationalliga A with the clear intention of reaching the championship group and to attempt to qualify for the European competitions. To achieve this would mean they would have to finish the qualifying stage under the top eight teams, which had failed during the previous seasons. The team also competed in the 2000–01 Swiss Cup. The FCA team had not qualified for the UEFA European competitions and they did not enter the Intertoto Cup.

== Players ==
The following is the list of the FCA first team squad this season. It also includes players that were in the squad the day the domestic league season started, on 15 July 2000, but subsequently left the club after that date.

Note: Flags indicate national team as defined under FIFA eligibility rules; some limited exceptions apply. Players may hold more than one non-FIFA nationality.

No.	Pos.	Nation	Player
1	GK	SUI	Ivan Benito (league games: 33)
—	GK	SUI	Alex Kollbrunner (league games: 1)
—	GK	SUI	Pascal Zuberbühler (league games: 2)
2	DF	SUI	David Bader (league games: 30)
4	DF	CRO	Mirko Pavličević (league games: 32)
5	DF	SUI	Frédéric Page (league games: 16)
12	DF	SUI	Mario Eggimann (league games: 30)
14	DF	SUI	Ivan Previtali (league games: 29)
16	DF	SUI	Marc Fiechter (league games: 31)
17	DF	ITA	Luca Iodice (league games: 23)
22	DF	SUI	Salvatore Romano (league games: 9)
—	DF	SUI	Flavio Schmid (league games: 2)
—	DF	SUI	Marc Strasser (league games: 1)
3	MF	FRA	Olivier Baudry (league games: 29)
6	MF	POL	Dariusz Skrzypczak (league games: 29)
7	MF	ITA	Roberto Baldassari (league games: 27)
8	MF	SUI	André Wiederkehr (league games: 33)

No.	Pos.	Nation	Player
15	MF	BIH	Amir Hamzić (league games: 7)
21	MF	SUI	Massimo Vivolo (league games: 1)
23	MF	SUI	Manuel Schenker (league games: 3)
25	MF	SUI	Carmine Pascariello (league games: 0)
27	MF	GER	Daniel Wolf (league games: 3)
—	MF	BRA	Cassiano (league games: 3)
—	MF	SUI	Remo Senn (league games: 5)
9	FW	SUI	Daniel Greco (league games: 8)
10	FW	SUI	Didi (league games: 20)
11	FW	GEO	Levan Khomeriki (league games: 30)
13	FW	ESP	Manuel Calvo (league games: 14)
19	FW	SUI	David Degen (league games: 5)
29	FW	SUI	Patrick De Napoli (league games: 25)
24	FW	ITA	Gerardo Donatiello (league games: 0)
26	FW	SUI	Remo Tovagliaro (league games: 0)
—	FW	BUL	Roumen Ivanov (league games: 17)
—	FW	SUI	Jean-Pierre La Placa (league games: 3)

Players who left the squad

The following is the list of the FCZ first team players that left the squad during the previous season or in the off-season, before the new domestic season began.

Note: Flags indicate national team as defined under FIFA eligibility rules; some limited exceptions apply. Players may hold more than one non-FIFA nationality.

No.	Pos.	Nation	Player
18	GK	SUI	Dino Roselli (unknown)
2	DF	SUI	Davide Zitola (reserves)
3	DF	SUI	Dejan Markovic (to SC YF Juventus)
5	DF	SUI	Beat Studer (to SC YF Juventus)
6	MF	SUI	Marcel Heldmann (to Zürich)
20	MF	SUI	Gerardo Viceconte (unknown)
32	MF	SUI	Daniel Tarone (to Bellinzona)
—	MF	NED	Lodewijk Roembiak (to Waldhof Mannheim)

No.	Pos.	Nation	Player
—	MF	POL	Sławomir Wojciechowski (to Bayern Munich)
11	FW	SUI	Lucio Esposito (to Zug 94)
21	FW	SUI	Carmine Viceconte (reserves)
22	FW	ITA	Gerardo Donatiello (reserves)
—	FW	BUL	Petar Alexandrov (to Kickers Luzern)
—	FW	CGO	Chris Bongo (unknown)
—	FW	SUI	Adrian Kunz (to SC Düdingen)
—	FW	SUI	Remo Tovagliaro (reserves)

== Results ==
Legend

Win Draw Loss Postponed

=== Nationalliga A ===
==== Qualifying Phase ====
The Qualification Round to the League season 2000–01 was contested by twelve teams. The first eight teams of the regular season (or Qualification) were then to compete in the Championship Playoff Round. The teams in the ninth to twelfth positions completed with the top four teams of the Nationalliga B in a promotion/relegation round. The qualifying phase started on 15 July 200 and was to be completed on 10 December.

15 July 2000 Round 1	Servette	2–1	Aarau	Charmilles Stadium, Geneva
19:30	Lonfat 53' (1:1); Rey 81' (2:1); Miéville (yellow card); Jeanneret (yellow card)	FCA summary	28' (0:1) Wiederkehr; (yellow card) Eggimann; (yellow card) Wiederkehr; (yellow card) Pavličević	Attendance: 2,522; Referee: (Switzerland) René Rogalla (Wallisellen)

19 July 2000 Round 2	Aarau	0–2	Lugano	Stadion Brügglifeld, Aarau
19:30	Skrzypczak (yellow card); Fiechter (yellow card)	FCA summary	44' (0:1) Giménez; 51' (0:2) Rossi; (yellow card) Magnin; (yellow card) Lubamba; (yellow card) Rota	Attendance: 3,500; Referee: (Switzerland) Nicole Petignat (Courgenay)

22 July 2000 Round 3	St. Gallen	3–0	Aarau	Espenmoos, St. Gallen
18:00	Guido 30' (1:0); Amoah 37' (2:0); Zellweger 89' (3:0)	FCA summary	(yellow card) Baldassarri; (yellow card) Fiechter	Attendance: 8,500; Referee: (Switzerland) Massimo Busacca (Monte Carasso/Bellinzona)

29 July 2000 Round 4	Luzern	0–0	Aarau	Stadion Allmend, Luzern
19:00	Ohrel (yellow card); Nkufo (yellow card)	FCA summary	(yellow card) Baldassarri; (yellow card) Bader	Attendance: 6,901; Referee: (Switzerland) Reto Rutz (Amriswil)

5 August 2000 Round 5	Aarau	2–1	Zürich	Stadion Brügglifeld, Aarau
19:30	Previtali 3' (1:1); Baudry 11' (2:1); Page (yellow card) 19'	FCZ summary	1' (0:1) Bartlett; (yellow card) 73' Giannini	Attendance: 3,900; Referee: (Switzerland) Philippe Leuba (Chexbres)

12 Augist 2000 Round 6	Sion	0–1	Aarau	Stade Tourbillon, Sion
19:30	Darbellay (yellow card); Fayolle (yellow card)	FCA summary	9' (0:1) Ivanov; (yellow card) (yellow-red card) 64' Bader; (yellow card) Ivanov; (yellow card) Skrzypczak; (yellow card) Baldassarri	Attendance: 7,900; Referee: (Switzerland) Carlo Bertolini (Vira-Gambarogno)

19 August 2000 Round 7	Aarau	1–2	Lausanne-Sport	Stadion Brügglifeld, Aarau
19:30	Baudry 63' (1:1); Pavličević (yellow card); Baudry (yellow card)	FCA summary	26' (0:1) Thiaw; 81' (1:2) Kuźba; (yellow card) Lombardo; (yellow card) Gomes	Attendance: 3,500; Referee: (Liechtenstein) Roland Beck (Triesenberg)

26 August 2000 Round 8	Xamax	1–5	Aarau	Stade de la Maladière, Neuchâtel
19:30	Luís Calapes 61' (1:3); Atouba (yellow card); Tschopp (yellow card)	FCA summary	7' (0:1) Ivanov; 39' (0:2) Khomeriki; 44' (0:3) Khomeriki; 65' (1:4) de Napoli; 90+3' (1:5) Calvo; (yellow card) Senn; (yellow card) Bader	Attendance: 3,900; Referee: (Switzerland) René Rogalla (Wallisellen)

5 September 2000 Round 9	Aarau	0–1	Basel	Stadion Brügglifeld, Aarau
19:30	Pavličević (yellow card) 3'	FCB summary FCA summary	(yellow card) 26' Cantaluppi; 36' (0:1) Tchouga	Attendance: 5,800; Referee: (Switzerland) Nicole Petignat (Courgenay)
Note: FCA without Page, Bader, Senn, Baudry, Skrzypczak, and De Napoli (all injured). FCA without Muff (injured).

10 September 2000 Round 10	Grasshopper Club	6–0	Aarau	Hardturm, Zürich
16:15	Chapuisat 38' (1:0); Gerber 49' (2:0); Chapuisat 56' (3:0); Chapuisat 58' (4:0); Zanni 73' (5:0); Petrić 81' (6:0); Haas (yellow card); Berner (yellow card)	FCA summary	(yellow card) Wolf; (yellow card) Vivolo; (yellow card) Wiederkehr; (yellow card) Previtali	Attendance: 5,400; Referee: (Switzerland) Philippe Leuba (Chexbres)

17 September 2000 Round 11	Aarau	4–3	Yverdon-Sports	Stadion Brügglifeld, Aarau
19:30	Khomeriki 8' (pen. 1:0); Baudry 52' (2:2); Khomeriki 62' (3:2); Khomeriki 67' (4:2); Benito (yellow card); Previtali (yellow card); Wiederkehr (yellow card)	FCA summary	11' (1:2) Peço; 53' (1:2) Gil Bala; 73' (4:3) Renfer; (red card) 77' Iglesias; (yellow card) Constantino	Attendance: 3,000; Referee: (Switzerland) Guido Wildhaber (Kerzers)

24 September 2000 Round 12	Aarau	0–3	Servette	Stadion Brügglifeld, Aarau
14:30	Skrzypczak (yellow card); Baudry (yellow card); Wiederkehr (yellow card)	FCA summary	21' (0:1) Lonfat; 25' (0:2) Šiljak; (red card) 28' Jaquet; 41' (0:3) Šiljak	Attendance: 3,400; Referee: (Liechtenstein) Roland Beck (Triesenberg)

29 September 2000 Round 13	Lugano	1–1	Aarau	Cornaredo, Lugano
19:30	Giménez 32' (1:0); Razzetti (red card) 43'; Rota (yellow card)	FCA summary	80' (1:1) Fiechter; (yellow card) Ivanov; (yellow card) Baudry; (yellow card) Pavličević; (yellow card) Khomeriki; (yellow card) Fiechter	Attendance: 3,680; Referee: (Switzerland) Andreas Schluchter (Schönenbuch)
Note: 17th minute, Baldassarri substitued out injured.

15 October 2000 Round 14	Aarau	1–1	St. Gallen	Stadion Brügglifeld, Aarau
14:30	Baudry 87' (1:1); Iodice (yellow card); Pavličević (yellow card); Previtali (yellow card)	FCA summary	(yellow card) (yellow-red card) 55' Müller; 59' (1:1) Gane; (yellow card) Winkler	Attendance: 4,600; Referee: (Switzerland) Dieter Schoch (Attiswil)

22 October 2000 Round 15	Aarau	3–3	Luzern	Stadion Brügglifeld, Aarau
14:30	Khomeriki 45' (1:2); Didi 60' (2:2); Baudry 81' (3:2); Wiederkehr (yellow card); Benito (yellow card)	FCA summary	16' (pen.) Wyss; 18' (0:2) Ohrel; 89' (pen. 3:3) Wyss; (yellow card) Selimi; (yellow card) Wyss; (yellow card) Amarildo	Attendance: 10,651; Referee: (Switzerland) Nicole Petignat (Courgenay)

29 October 2000 Round 16	Zürich	1–0	Aarau	Letzigrund, Zürich
14:30	Jamarauli (yellow card) 78'; Chassot 85' (1:0)	FCZ summary	(red card) 54' Baldassarri	Attendance: 4,600; Referee: (Switzerland) Markus Nobs (Wohlen bei Bern)

1 November 2000 Round 17	Aarau	1–1	Sion	Stadion Brügglifeld, Aarau
19:30	Bader 34' (1:0); Eggimann (yellow card); Pavličević (yellow card) de Napoli (yellow card); Fiechter (yellow card); Skrzypczak (yellow card)	FCA summary	90+1' (1:1) Hottiger; (yellow card) Kenedy; (yellow card) Sarni	Attendance: 3,200; Referee: (Switzerland) Philippe Leuba (Chexbres)

4 November 2000 Round 18	Lausanne-Sport	1–3	Aarau	Olympique de la Pontaise, Lausanne
19:30	Pape Thiaw 63' (1:2); Mazzoni (yellow card)	FCA summary	27' (0:1) Didi; 47' (0:2) Previtali; 75' (1:3) Wiederkehr; (yellow card) Previtali; (yellow card) Eggimann; (yellow card) Didi; (yellow card) Pavličević	Attendance: 2,050; Referee: (Switzerland) Andreas Schluchter (Schönenbuch)

19 November 2000 Round 19	Aarau	2–0	Xamax	Stadion Brügglifeld, Aarau
14:30	Didi 17' (1:0); Wiederkehr 83' (2:0)	FCA summary	(yellow card) (yellow-red card) 49' Sene; (yellow card) (yellow-red card) 79' Barea	Attendance: 3,100; Referee: (Switzerland) René Rogalla (Wallisellen)

26 November 2000 Round 20	Basel	5–2	Aarau	Stadion Schützenmatte, Basel
16:15	Koumantarakis 24' (1:1); Huggel 30' (2:1); Huggel (yellow card) 37'; Varela (yellow card) 39'; Huggel 47' (3:1); Tchouga 65' (4:2); Tholot 85' (5:2)	FCB summary FCA summary	7' (0:1) Wiederkehr; (yellow card) 34' Hamdzic; (yellow card) 50' Didi; 54' (3:2) Wiederkehr; (red card) 68' Senn	Attendance: 6,251; Referee: (Switzerland) Massimo Busacca (Monte Carasso/Bellinzona)
Note: FCB without Magro (suspended) as well as König, Savic, Muff, and Aziawonou (all injured). FCA without Previtali (suspended), De Napoli, Page, and Baudry (all injured), as well as Ivanov (relegated to the youth squad).

3 December 2000 Round 21	Aarau	1–3	Grasshopper Club	Stadion Brügglifeld, Aarau
16:15	Degen 46' (1:1); Skrzypczak (yellow card); Degen (yellow card); Fiechter (yellow card)	FCA summary	29' (0:1) Chapuisat; 49' (1:2) Yakin; 52' (pen.) Chapuisat; (yellow card) Hodel	Attendance: 5,200; Referee: (Switzerland) Dieter Schoch (Attiswil)
Note: FCA without Senn (suspended).

10 December 2000 Round 22	Yverdon-Sports	3–3	Aarau	Stade Municipal, Yverdon
16:15	Gil Bala 18' (1:1); Gohouri 86' (2:3); Gohouri 90' (3:3); Favre (yellow card); Delay (yellow card)	FCA summary	3' (0:1) Wiederkehr; 25' (1:2) Didi; 54' (1:3) Wiederkehr; (yellow card) Previtali; (yellow card) Didi	Attendance: 900; Referee: (Liechtenstein) Roland Beck (Triesenberg)

==== League table ====
Pos	Team	Pld	W	D	L	GF	GA	GD	Pts	Qualification
1	Lugano	22	12	6	4	33	16	+17	42	Advance to championship round halved points (rounded up) as bonus
2	St. Gallen	22	11	7	4	43	18	+25	40	Advance to championship round halved points (rounded up) as bonus
3	Grasshopper Club	22	11	3	8	46	25	+21	36	Advance to championship round halved points (rounded up) as bonus
4	Lausanne-Sport	22	11	2	9	37	34	+3	35	Advance to championship round halved points (rounded up) as bonus
5	Basel	22	10	4	8	42	36	+6	34	Advance to championship round halved points (rounded up) as bonus
6	Servette	22	9	6	7	34	26	+8	33	Advance to championship round halved points (rounded up) as bonus
7	Sion	22	9	5	8	27	31	−4	32	Advance to championship round halved points (rounded up) as bonus
8	Zürich	22	8	7	7	36	29	+7	31	Advance to championship round halved points (rounded up) as bonus
9	Aarau	22	6	6	10	31	43	−12	24	Continue to promotion/relegation round
10	Yverdon-Sport	22	5	6	11	27	43	−16	21	Continue to promotion/relegation round
11	Xamax	22	6	2	14	21	53	−32	20	Continue to promotion/relegation round
12	Luzern	22	5	4	13	27	50	−23	19	Continue to promotion/relegation round

Source: RSSSF
Rules for classification: 1) points; 2) goal difference; 3) number of goals scored; 4) Head-to-head points; 5) Away goals scored; 6) Draw.

==== Promotion/relegation NLA/NLB ====
The teams in the ninth to twelfth positions in Nationalliga A competed with the top four teams of Nationalliga B in a Nationalliga A/B Playoff round. This phase began on the week-end of Saturday 24 February 2001 and was completed on Sunday 27 May.

24 February 2001 Round 1	Aarau	0–2	Bellinzona	Stadion Brügglifeld, Aarau
17:30	Baudry (yellow card); Skrzypczak (yellow card)	FCA summary	13' (0:1) Bugnard; 43' (0:2) Manfreda; (yellow card) Mensah; (yellow card) Sarni; (yellow card) Edusei	Attendance: 1,900; Referee: (Switzerland) Andreas Schluchter (Schönenbuch)

4 March 2001 Round 2	Young Boys	P–P	Aarau	Wankdorf Stadium, Bern
		FCA summary
Note: Severe winter weather and heavy snowfall across Switzerland, the match was postponed.

7 March 2001 Round 2	Young Boys	1–0	Aarau	Wankdorf Stadium, Bern
19:30	Tholot 89' (1:0); Mitreski (yellow card); Burri (yellow card); Pintul (yellow card); Häberli (yellow card)	FCA summary	(yellow card) Wiederkehr; (yellow card) Khomeriki; (yellow card) Fiechter	Attendance: 4,000; Referee: (Switzerland) Carlo Bertolini (Vira-Gambarogno)
Note: The match was originally scheduled for Sunday 4 March 2001, but after the postponement due to heavy snowfall, it was rescheduled for three days later.

10 March 2001 Round 3	Aarau	0–0	Yverdon-Sports	Stadion Brügglifeld, Aarau
17:30	Romano (yellow card); Baldassarri (yellow card)	FCA summary	(yellow card) (yellow-red card) 31' Andreoli	Attendance: 1,450; Referee: (Liechtenstein) Roland Beck (Triesenberg)

18 March 2001 Round 4	Luzern	3–0	Aarau	Stadion Allmend, Luzern
14:30	Clemente 42' (1:0); Rey 60' (2:0); Arnold 90+2' (3:0); Hodel (yellow card); Wyss (yellow card)	FCA summary	(yellow card) Wiederkehr; (yellow card) de Napoli; (yellow card) Previtali; (yellow card) Pavličević	Attendance: 4,944; Referee: (Switzerland) Dieter Schoch (Attiswil)

31 March 2001 Round 5	Winterthur	1–2	Aarau	Schützenwiese, Winterthur
17:30	(Baudry) 60' (o.g.)	FCA summary	35' (0:1) Previtali; 81' (1:2) de Napoli	Attendance: 2,450; Referee: (Switzerland) Florian Etter

7 April 2001 Round 6	Aarau	1–0	Wil	Stadion Brügglifeld, Aarau
17:30	Didi 2' (1:0); Skrzypczak (yellow card); Hamzic (yellow card); Page (yellow card)	FCA summary	(yellow card) Hasler; (yellow card) Gambino; (yellow card) Mehmeti	Attendance: 3,000; Referee: (Switzerland) Claudio Circhetta (Muttenz)

16 April 2001 Round 7	Xamax	3–2	Aarau	Stade de la Maladière, Neuchâtel
19:30	Skachenko 11' (1:0); Skachenko 20' (2:0); Skachenko 56' (3:1); Oppliger (yellow card)	FCA summary	47' (2:1) Wiederkehr; 83' (3:2) Baudry	Attendance: 3,900; Referee: (Switzerland) Markus Nobs (Wohlen bei Bern)

21 April 2001 Round 8	Aarau	1–1	Xamax	Stadion Brügglifeld, Aarau
17:30	Didi 57' (1:1) de Napoli (yellow card); Romano (yellow card); Wiederkehr (yellow card)	FCA summary	Tachie-Mensah 11' (0:1); (yellow card) Skachenko	Attendance: 2,000; Referee: (Switzerland) Jean-Luc Schmid

28 April 2001 Round 9	Wil	2–3	Aarau	Stadion Bergholz, Wil
17:30	Sawu 19' (1:0); Sawu 27' (2:0); Mehmeti (yellow card); Rizzo (yellow card)	FCA summary	54' (2:1) Didi; 75' (2:2) Previtali; 78' (2:3) Baudry; (yellow card) Baudry; (yellow card) Wiederkehr	Attendance: 690; Referee: (Switzerland) Florian Etter

5 May 2001 Round 10	Aarau	2–0	Winterthur	Stadion Brügglifeld, Aarau
17:30	de Napoli 6' (1:0) de Napoli 71' (2:0) de Napoli (yellow card); Eggimann (yellow card)	FCA summary	(yellow card) Baumann; (yellow card) Castillo	Attendance: 3,300; Referee: (Liechtenstein) Roland Beck (Triesenberg)

12 May 2001 Round 11	Aarau	3–0	Luzern	Stadion Brügglifeld, Aarau
17:30	Previtali 68' (1:0); Khomeriki 86' (2:0) de Napoli 90' (3:0); Romano (yellow card); Skrzypczak (yellow card)	FCA summary	(yellow card) Ohrel	Attendance: 4,100; Referee: (Switzerland) Reto Rutz (Amriswil)

16 May 2001 Round 12	Yverdon-Sports	1–1	Aarau	Stade Municipal, Yverdon
19:30	Rochat 20' (1:0); Peço (yellow card); Gil Bala (yellow card)	FCA summary	23' (1:1) Didi; (yellow card) Baudry; (yellow card) Bader; (yellow card) de Napoli	Attendance: 1,200; Referee: (Switzerland) René Rogalla (Wallisellen)

20 May 2001 Round 13	Aarau	2–0	Young Boys	Stadion Brügglifeld, Aarau
16:15	Previtali 33' (1:0); Khomeriki 87' (2:0); Pavličević (yellow card); Bader (yellow card)	FCA summary	(yellow card) Malacarne; (yellow card) Rotanzi	Attendance: 4,500; Referee: (Switzerland) Massimo Busacca (Monte Carasso/Bellinzona)

27 May 2001 Round 14	Bellinzona	1–6	Aarau	Stadio Comunale, Bellinzona
14:30	Tarone 39' (1:3)	FCA summary	4' (0:1) Baudry; 21' (0:2) Baudry; 32' (0:3) de Napoli; 44' (1:4) Skrzypczak; 49' (1:5) Schenker; 66' (1:6) Khomeriki	Attendance: 1,500; Referee: (Switzerland) Bleuler (Grasshopper Club)

==== Final table ====
Pos	Team	Pld	W	D	L	GF	GA	GD	Pts	Promotion or relegation
1	Neuchâtel Xamax	14	7	6	1	24	16	+8	27	Remain in NLA
2	Aarau	14	7	3	4	23	15	+8	24	Remain in NLA
3	Luzern	14	7	3	4	24	18	+6	24	Remain in NLA
4	Young Boys	14	7	3	4	17	14	+3	24	Promoted to NLA
5	Yverdon-Sport	14	4	7	3	23	20	+3	19	Relegated to NLB
6	Winterthur	14	5	2	7	18	21	−3	17	Remain in NLB
7	Wil	14	2	5	7	17	22	−5	11	Remain in NLB
8	Bellinzona	14	1	3	10	8	28	−20	6	Remain in NLB

Source: RSSSF
Rules for classification: 1) points; 2) goal difference; 3) number of goals scored; 4) Head-to-head points; 5) Away goals scored; 6) Draw.

=== Swiss Cup ===
The 2000–01 Swiss Cup was the 76th season of Switzerland's annual cup competition. It began on 9 August with the first game of Round 1 and ended on Sunday 10 June 2001 with the final held at the newly opened St. Jakob-Park in Basel. The cup winners earned a place in the first round of the UEFA Cup. The 12 first-tier clubs from the 2000–01 Nationalliga A had been granted byes for the first four rounds and they joined the competition in the fifth round. The first-tier teams were seeded and cound not be drawn against each other. The draw respected regionalities, when possible, and the lower classed team was granted home advantage.

11 November 2000 Round 5	FC Schaffhausen	1–1 (a.e.t.) (4–3 p)	Aarau	Stadion Breite, Schaffhausen
16:30	Dos Santos 29' (1:0)	FCA summary	45' (1:1) Pavličević	Attendance: 1,1/2; Referee: (Switzerland) Dieter Schoch (Attiswil)
	Penalties
	Leu (penalty scored); Rohrer (penalty scored); Gil Steven Ribeiro (penalty scored); Stoop (penalty scored)		(penalty missed) Ivanov; (penalty scored) Khomeriki; (penalty scored) Senn; (penalty scored) Pavličević; (penalty missed) Skrzypczak

At the end of the season Servette won the cup and this was the club's seventh cup title to this date.

=== Friendly matches ===
FCA played various Exhibition games, here are a few examples.

11 Febriary 2001 Exhibition game	Aarau	1–2	Zürich	Stadion Brügglifeld, Aarau
	Khomeriki 88' (1:2)	FCZ summary	56' (0:1) Giannini; 63' (0:2) Kavelashvili
Note: 72 minute, a shot from Kavelashvili hit the crossbar.

23 March 2001 Mid-season	Basel	1–2	Aarau	Stadion Rankhof, Basel
18:00	Savić 51' (1:0)	FCB summary	58' (1:1) Didi; 75' (1:2) Didi	Attendance: 200; Referee: (Switzerland) Martin Salm
Note: FCB without Cravero and Cantaluppi (both injured), Muff, Yakin, and König (all on national team duty), as well as Tum and Tchouga (rested). 27th minute a shot from Magro hit the crossbar, 31st minute a shot from Kreuzer hit the crossbar. Corners: 6–4 (4–3). Fair game, no cautions given.

== Sources ==
- Switzerland 2000–01 at RSSSF
- FCA squad 2000–01 at arowa.ch

Preceded by 1999–2000	FC Aarau seasons	Succeeded by 2001–02
