= 1994–95 FC Aarau season =

FC Aarau
1994–95 season
- Club president: Ernst Lämmli
- Head-coach: Rolf Fringer
- Stadium: Stadion Brügglifeld, Aarau
- 1994–95 NLA Qualifying phase: 3rd of 12
- Championship group: 4th of 8
- 1994–95 Swiss Cup: Round 3
- 1994–95 UEFA Cup: Round 1
- Sepione Cup: Winners
- Top goalscorer: League: Ratinho (12); All: Ratinho (12)

The 1994–95 season was FC Aarau's 92nd season in their existence, since their foundation in 1902. It was their thirteenth season in the top flight of Swiss football, following their promotion at the end of 1980–81 season. FCA played their home games in the Stadion Brügglifeld and the stadium is located on the southern outskirts of Aarau, in the territory of the neighboring municipality of Suhr. It is about one and a half kilometers from Aarau city center and the railway station.

== Overview ==
The local businessman and architect Ernst Lämmli was the club's chairman and patron at this time. He held this position since the AGM in 1989. Lämmli had appointed the Austrian Rolf Fringer as head-coach two seasons earlier and after achieving the championship title in his first season with the team and qualifing for the UEFA Cup the previous season, his contract was extended.

The FCA first team competed in this season's domestic first-tier 1994–95 Nationalliga A with the clear intention of reaching the championship group and again to qualify for the European competitions. To achieve this would mean they would have to finish the qualifying stage under the top eight teams. The team had qualified for the 1994–95 UEFA Cup preliminary round and their aim here was to reach the main stage. The team also competed in the 1994–95 Swiss Cup. The first-tier teams from the NLA were granted byes for the first two cup rounds, eight of them competed in round three. The four teams that were engaged in the European competitions were granted byes for the third round and FCA competed in round four. FCA did not enter the 1994 Intertoto Cup.

== Players ==
The following is the list of the FCA first team squad this season. It also includes players that were in the squad the day the domestic league season started, on 27 July 1994, but subsequently left the club after that date.

Note: Flags indicate national team as defined under FIFA eligibility rules; some limited exceptions apply. Players may hold more than one non-FIFA nationality.

No.	Pos.	Nation	Player
1	GK	SUI	Andreas Hilfiker (league games: 32)
—	GK	SUI	Walter Müller (league games: 4)
—	DF	SUI	David Bader (league games: 34)
—	DF	SUI	Sven Christ (league games: 26)
—	DF	SUI	Dejan Markovic (league games: 16)
—	DF	CRO	Mirko Pavličević (league games: 32)
—	DF	SUI	Beat Studer (league games: 33)
—	DF	SUI	Daniel Wyss (league games: 32)
—	MF	SUI	Renato Brugnoli (league games: 34)

No.	Pos.	Nation	Player
—	MF	SUI	Patrick Bühlmann (league games: 34)
—	MF	SUI	Marcel Heldmann (league games: 22)
—	MF	SUI	Michael Mazenauer (league games: 14)
—	MF	BRA	Ratinho (league games: 36)
—	MF	POL	Dariusz Skrzypczak (league games: 34)
—	FW	SUI	Reto Burri (league games: 4)
—	FW	SUI	Martin Fink (league games: 30)
—	FW	SUI	Joris Gratwohl (league games: 2)
—	FW	SUI	Andreas Höhener (league games: 6)
—	FW	POL	Cezary Kucharski (league games: 34)

Players who left the squad

The following is the list of the FCZ first team players that left the squad during the previous season or in the off-season, before the new domestic season began.

Note: Flags indicate national team as defined under FIFA eligibility rules; some limited exceptions apply. Players may hold more than one non-FIFA nationality.

No.	Pos.	Nation	Player
—	DF	SUI	Bernd Kilian (to Grasshopper Club)
—	DF	SUI	Stefan Marini (to Thun as head-coach)
—	DF	ITA	Salvatore Romano (to Lausanne-Sport)
—	DF	SUI	Arne Stiel (to Baden)
—	DF	SUI	René Weiler (to Servette)

No.	Pos.	Nation	Player
—	MF	SUI	Heinz Hermann (retired)
—	MF	SUI	Stefan Renggli (to Luzern)
—	MF	GER	Sascha Stauch (to SV 08 Laufenburg (Germany))
—	MF	SUI	Thomas Wyss (to Luzern)
—	FW	BUL	Petar Alexandrov (to Levski Sofia)
—	FW	POL	Ryszard Komornicki (to Wohlen as player-coach)

== Results ==
Legend

Win Draw Loss Postponed

=== Nationalliga A ===
==== Qualification phase ====
The qualification of the NLA began on 27 July 1994, with the exception of Sion–Aarau that was played three days later, and was completed on 4 December. The top eight teams in the qualification phase would advance to the championship group and the last four teams would play against relegation.

30 July 1994 Round 1	Sion	2–0	Aarau	Stade Tourbillon, Sion
20:00	Assis 8' (1:0); Geiger 14' (2:0); Herr (yellow card)	FCA summary	(yellow card) Fink	Attendance: 9,500; Referee: (Switzerland) Serge Muhmenthaler (Grenchen)

3 August 1994 Round 2	Aarau	3–0	Zürich	Stadion Brügglifeld, Aarau
20:00	Pavličević 68' (1:0); Kucharski 82' (2:0); Fink 83' (3:0)	FCZ summary FCA summary	(yellow card) 31' Hodel; (yellow card) 75' Škoro	Attendance: 5,800; Referee: (Switzerland) Daniel Roduit (Sion)

6 August 1994 Round 3	Aarau	0–0	Lugano	Stadion Brügglifeld, Aarau
20:00	Pavličević (yellow card)	FCA summary	(yellow card) Colombo; (yellow card) Carrasco; (yellow card) Manfreda; (yellow card) Bugnard	Attendance: 4,300; Referee: (Switzerland) Karl Strässle (Steinach)

13 August 1994 Round 4	Luzern	1–0	Aarau	Stadion Allmend, Luzern
20:00	Güntensperger 68' (1:0); Rueda (yellow card); Güntensperger (yellow card)	FCA summary	(yellow card) (yellow-red card) 39' Kucharski; (yellow card) Heldmann	Attendance: 10,200; Referee: (Switzerland) Claude Detruche (Thônex)

20 August 1994 Round 5	Aarau	2–0	Young Boys	Stadion Brügglifeld, Aarau
20:00	Skrzypczak 24' (1:0) (Christensen) 80' (o.g.)	FCA summary		Attendance: 4,500; Referee: (Switzerland) Serge Muhmenthaler (Grenchen)
Note: Fair game, no cautions.

27 August 1994 Round 6	Servette	2–2	Aarau	Charmilles Stadium, Geneva
20:00	Canil 49' (1:1); Canil 79' (2:2)	FCA summary	33' (0:1) Ratinho; 63' (1:2) Fink; (yellow card) Fink	Attendance: 4,300; Referee: (Switzerland) Gottfried Friedrich (Seedorf, Uri)

31 August 1994 Round 7	Aarau	0–0	Basel	Stadion Brügglifeld, Aarau
20:00	Fink (yellow card) 8'; Ratinho (yellow card) 83'	FCB summary FCA summary	(yellow card) 44' Olsen; (yellow card) 56' Šarić; (yellow card) 57' Jeitziner	Attendance: 7,400; Referee: (Switzerland) Kurt Zuppinger (Bremgarten, Aargau)
Note: FCA without Hediger, Höhener and Mazenauer, FCB without Tabakovic, Smajic and Grüter (all injured). A confused, inconsistent referee.

3 September 1994 Round 8	Xamax	1–1	Aarau	Stade de la Maladière, Neuchâtel
20:00	Gottardi 11' (1:0); Wallon (yellow card); Détári (yellow card)	FCA summary	30' (pen. 1:1) Kucharski; (yellow card) Ratinho; (yellow card) Pavličević; (yellow card) Bader	Attendance: 9,100; Referee: (Switzerland) Jürg Herrmann (Hinterkapplen (Wohlen bei Bern))

10 September 1994 Round 9	Aarau	1–1	Lausanne-Sport	Stadion Brügglifeld, Aarau
20:00	Wyss 88' (1:1)	FCA summary	38' (0:1) Badea	Attendance: 3,900; Referee: (Switzerland) Dieter Schoch (Attiswil)
Note: Fair game, no cautions.

17 September 1994 Round 10	St. Gallen	2–2	Aarau	Espenmoos, St. Gallen
17:30	Frick 12' (1:0); Gilewicz 68' (pen. 2:2); Gambino (yellow card)	FCA summary	17' (1:1) Ratinho; 49' (1:2) Studer; (yellow card) Wyss; (yellow card) Pavličević	Attendance: 6,000; Referee: (Switzerland) Freddy Philippoz (Sion)

21 September 1994 Round 11	Aarau	5–1	Grasshopper Club	Stadion Brügglifeld, Aarau
20:00	Wyss 57' (1:0); Ratinho 64' (2:0); Skrzypczak 68' (3:0); Kucharski 82' (4:1); Bühlmann 89' (5:1); (yellow card) Markovic; (yellow card) Christ	FCA summary	69' (3:1) Lombardo; (yellow card) Vega	Attendance: 5,100; Referee: (Switzerland) Serge Muhmenthaler (Grenchen)

1 October 1994 Round 12	Aarau	3–0	Sion	Stadion Brügglifeld, Aarau
20:00	Fink 19' (1:0); Ratinho 35' (2:0); Wyss 90' (3:0); Fink (yellow card)	FCA summary	(yellow card) Oggier; (yellow card) Herr	Attendance: 4,300; Referee: (Switzerland) Claude Detruche (Thônex)

5 October 1994 Round 13	Zürich	4–0	Aarau	Letzigrund, Zürich
20:00	Tarone 42' (1:0); Møller 55' (2:0); Škoro (yellow card) 63' (yellow-red card) 68'; Favre 81' (3:0); Waas 84' (4:0)	FCZ summary FCA summary		Attendance: 3,800; Referee: (Switzerland) Daniel Roduit (Sion)

16 October 1994 Round 14	Lugano	1–1	Aarau	Cornaredo, Lugano
14:30	Patrick Englund 18' (1:1); Colombo (yellow card); Andrioli (yellow card); Galvão (yellow card)	FCA summary	8' (0:1) Ratinho; (yellow card) Kucharski	Attendance: 4,500; Referee: (Switzerland) Gottfried Friedrich (Seedorf, Uri)

23 October 1994 Round 15	Aarau	2–1	Luzern	Stadion Brügglifeld, Aarau
14:30	Christ 71' (1:0); Wyss 88' (2:0); Brugnoli (yellow card)	FCA summary	(yellow card) (yellow-red card) 79' Bertelsen; 90+1' (2:1) Camenzind; (yellow card) van Eck	Attendance: 6,900; Referee: (Switzerland) Yvan Cornu

26 October 1994 Round 16	Young Boys	1–0	Aarau	Wankdorf Stadium, Bern
20:00	Giallanza 58' (1:0); Aduobe (yellow card); Giallanza (yellow card); Neqrouz (yellow card)	FCA summary	(yellow card) Skrzypczak	Attendance: 2,300; Referee: (Switzerland) Philippe Leuba (Chexbres)

30 October 1994 Round 17	Aarau	3–0	Servette	Stadion Brügglifeld, Aarau
14:30	Heldmann 34' (1:0); Kucharski 53' (2:0); Skrzypczak 78' (3:0); Skrzypczak (yellow card)	FCA summary	(yellow card) Barberis; (yellow card) Moro; (yellow card) Margarini; (yellow card) Aeby	Attendance: 5,400; Referee: (Switzerland) Erwin Fölmli

5 November 1994 Round 18	Basel	0–2	Aarau	St. Jakob Stadium, Basel
17:30	Smajić (yellow card) 22'	FCB summary FCA summary	(yellow card) 44' Bühlmann; (yellow card) 60' Pavličević; (yellow card) 62' Wyss; 75' (0:1) Ratinho; 87' (0:2) Ratinho	Attendance: 14,000; Referee: (Switzerland) Serge Muhmenthaler (Grenchen)
Note: FCB without Van Duren (injured); FCA without Heidmann (ill) and Hediger (injured).

9 November 1994 Round 19	Aarau	2–2	Xamax	Stadion Brügglifeld, Aarau
20:00	Fink 45' (1:0); Fink 58' (2:0); Fink (yellow card)	FCA summary	68' (2:1) Aleksandrov; 86' (2:2) Ivanov	Attendance: 4,400; Referee: (Switzerland) Gottfried Friedrich (Seedorf, Uri)

20 November 1994 Round 20	Lausanne-Sport	P–P	Aarau	Olympique de la Pontaise, Lausanne
14:30		[ FCA summary]

22 November 1994 Round 20	Lausanne-Sport	2–2	Aarau	Olympique de la Pontaise, Lausanne
20:00	Sogbie 1' (1:0); Sogbie 45' (pen. 2:2); Biaggi (red card) 58'; La Placa (yellow card) (yellow-red card) 64'; Pister (yellow card); Badea (yellow card)	FCA summary	4' (1:1) Ratinho; 18' (1:2) Fink; (red card) 45' Pavličević; (red card) 58' Fink	Attendance: 2,800; Referee: (Switzerland) Dieter Schoch (Attiswil)
Note: The match was originally scheduled for Sunday, but was posponed and rescheduled.

27 November 1994 Round 21	Aarau	3–0	St. Gallen	Stadion Brügglifeld, Aarau
14:30	Bühlmann 11' (1:0); Kucharski 51' (2:0); Ratinho 70' (3:0); Christ (yellow card)	FCA summary	(yellow card) Winkler	Attendance: 5,400; Referee: (Switzerland) Michel Zen-Ruffinen

4 December 1994 Round 22	Grasshopper Club	1–0	Aarau	Hardturm, Zürich
14:30	Vega 25' (1:0); Willems (yellow card); Gämperle (yellow card)	FCA summary	(yellow card) Kucharski; (yellow card) Bühlmann	Attendance: 5,700; Referee: (Switzerland) Gottfried Friedrich (Seedorf, Uri)

==== Qualification table ====
Pos	Team	Pld	W	D	L	GF	GA	GD	Pts	Qualification
1	Grasshopper Club	22	13	5	4	36	21	+15	31	Advance to championship round halved points (rounded up) as bonus
2	Lugano	22	8	9	5	30	17	+13	25	Advance to championship round halved points (rounded up) as bonus
3	Aarau	22	8	9	5	34	22	+12	25	Advance to championship round halved points (rounded up) as bonus
4	Xamax	22	9	6	7	33	31	+2	24	Advance to championship round halved points (rounded up) as bonus
5	Lausanne-Sport	22	8	8	6	34	35	−1	24	Advance to championship round halved points (rounded up) as bonus
6	Sion	22	10	3	9	32	37	−5	23	Advance to championship round halved points (rounded up) as bonus
7	Basel	22	6	8	8	18	15	+3	20	Advance to championship round halved points (rounded up) as bonus
8	Luzern	22	7	6	9	22	31	−9	20	Advance to championship round halved points (rounded up) as bonus
9	Zürich	22	4	11	7	23	27	−4	19	Continue to promotion/relegation round
10	Servette	22	6	6	10	26	31	−5	18	Continue to promotion/relegation round
11	St. Gallen	22	4	10	8	20	28	−8	18	Continue to promotion/relegation round
12	Young Boys	22	6	5	11	24	37	−13	17	Continue to promotion/relegation round

Source: rsssf.com
Rules for classification: 1) Points; 2) Goal difference; 3) Goals scored; 4) Head-to-head points; 5) Away goals scored; 6) Draw.

==== Championship group ====
The first eight teams of the qualification phase competed in the Championship round. The teams took half of the points (rounded up to complete units) gained in the qualification as bonus with them. The championship group began on 26 February 1995 and was completed on 13 June.

26 February 1995 Round 1	Aarau	0–1	Basel	Stadion Brügglifeld, Aarau
14:30		FCB summary FCA summary	(yellow card) 16' Ceccaroni; 90' (0:1) Zuffi	Attendance: 9,300; Referee: (Switzerland) Serge Muhmenthaler (Grenchen)
Note: FCA were without Heldmann, Markovic (both injured), Kucharski, and Pavlicevic (both suspended). FCB were without Jeitziner (injured), Rey (fell ill with a 40-degree fever on Sunday night), Hertig, Saric, and Yakin (all suspended). First National League appearance for Moser (formerly of Birsfelden). Position changes after halftime: Moser in midfield, Smajic in attack. The pitch was in relatively good playing condition. Around 4,500 Basel fans were in attendance. A confident performance from referee Muhmenthaler and his linesmen.

5 March 1995 Round 2	Lausanne-Sport	0–1	Aarau	Olympique de la Pontaise, Lausanne
14:30	La Placa (yellow card)	FCA summary	51' (0:1) Fink; (yellow card) Mazenauer	Attendance: 3,700; Referee: (Switzerland) Andreas Schluchter (Schönenbuch)

12 March 1995 Round 3	Aarau	3–3	Lugano	Stadion Brügglifeld, Aarau
14:30	Skrzypczak 37' (1:1); Fink 72' (2:2); Ratinho 90+3' (3:3)	FCA summary	34' (0:1) Englund; 67' (1:2) Ferreira; 84' (pen. 2:3) Fernandez; (yellow card) Esposito; (yellow card) Morf	Attendance: 6,100; Referee: (Switzerland) Yvan Cornu

2 April 1995 Round 4	Luzern	1–0	Aarau	Stadion Allmend, Luzern
14:30	Güntensperger 61' (1:0); Gmür (yellow card)	FCA summary	(yellow card) Fink	Attendance: 9,600; Referee: (Switzerland) Claude Detruche (Thônex)

8 April 1995 Round 5	Grasshopper Club	1–0	Aarau	Hardturm, Zürich
17:30	Subiat 28' (1:0)	FCA summary		Attendance: 6,100; Referee: (Switzerland) Yvan Cornu
Note: Fair game, no cautions.

12 April 1995 Round 6	Aarau	1–1	Xamax	Stadion Brügglifeld, Aarau
20:00	Ratinho 70' (1:1)	FCA summary	39' (0:1) Aleksandrov	Attendance: 4,200; Referee: (Switzerland) Gottfried Friedrich (Seedorf, Uri)
Note: Fair game, no cautions.

29 April 1995 Round 7	Aarau	2–1	Sion	Stadion Brügglifeld, Aarau
20:00	Wyss 25' (1:0); Kucharski 82' (2:0)	FCA summary	85' (2:1) Bonvin; (yellow card) (yellow-red card) 88' Quentin; (yellow card) Giannini; (yellow card) Fournier	Attendance: 3,700; Referee: (Switzerland) Serge Muhmenthaler (Grenchen)

6 May 1995 Round 8	Sion	2–0	Aarau	Stade Tourbillon, Sion
20:00	Ouattara 23' (1:0); Bonvin 38' (2:0)	FCA summary	(yellow card) Markovic; (yellow card) Christ	Attendance: 7,500; Referee: (Switzerland) Kurt Zuppinger (Bremgarten, Aargau)

13 May 1995 Round 9	Xamax	3–0	Aarau	Stade de la Maladière, Neuchâtel
20:00	Wittl 2' (1:0); Aleksandrov 30' (2:0); Aleksandrov 86' (1:0); Corminbœuf (yellow card)	FCA summary	(yellow card) Skrzypczak	Attendance: 6,900; Referee: (Liechtenstein) Roland Beck (Triesenberg)

2 Mav 1995 Round 10	Aarau	2–2	Grasshopper Club	Stadion Brügglifeld, Aarau
20:00	Heldmann 48' (1:0); Christ 76' (2:0); Kucharski (yellow card); Christ (yellow card); Fink (yellow card)	FCA summary	86' (2:1) Koller; 90+4' (2:2) Gren; (yellow card) Rząsa; (yellow card) Gren	Attendance: 7,100; Referee: (Switzerland) Claude Detruche (Thônex)

27 May 1995 Round 11	Aarau	3–0	Luzern	Stadion Brügglifeld, Aarau
20:00	Kucharski 24' (1:0); Kucharski 51' (2:0); Mazenauer 90' (3:0); Studer (yellow card)	FCA summary	(yellow card) Bachmann; (yellow card) van Eck	Attendance: 6,000; Referee: (Switzerland) Serge Muhmenthaler (Grenchen)

31 May 1995 Round 12	Lugano	0–0	Aarau	Cornaredo, Lugano
20:00	Fernandez (yellow card)	FCA summary	(yellow card) Wyss	Attendance: 2,500; Referee: (Switzerland) Freddy Philippoz (Sion)

10 June 1995 Round 13	Aarau	4–1	Lausanne-Sport	Stadion Brügglifeld, Aarau
20:00	Pavličević 49' (1:0); Pavličević 60' (2:0); Kucharski 71' (3:1); Kucharski 81' (4:1)	FCA summary	70' (2:1) Sogbie	Attendance: 3,400; Referee: (Switzerland) Gottfried Friedrich (Seedorf, Uri)
Note: Fair game. no cautions

13 June 1995 Round 14	Basel	0–1	Aarau	St. Jakob Stadium, Basel
20:00		FCB summary	41' (0:1) Ratinho; (yellow card) 67' Christ	Attendance: 6,500; Referee: (Switzerland) Daniel Roduit
Note: Numerous honors before the match for: Rehorek, Fringer, Roduit, Jeitziner, Van Duren, Hertig, Saric, Niederer, Steingruber. FCB without Walker (suspended), Cantaluppi, Moser (injured), Zuffi (on vacation), Aarau without Gratwohl and Hediger (injured).

==== Final league table ====
Pos	Team	Pld	W	D	L	GF	GA	GD	BP	Pts	Qualification
1	Grasshopper Club	14	9	3	2	25	13	+12	16	37	Swiss champions, qualified for 1995–96 Champions League
2	Lugano	14	6	5	3	25	17	+8	13	30	qualified for 1995–96 UEFA Cup
3	Xamax	14	6	4	4	27	20	+7	12	28	qualified for 1995–96 UEFA Cup
4	Aarau	14	5	4	5	17	16	+1	13	27	entered 1995 UEFA Intertoto Cup
5	Luzern	14	5	5	4	14	18	−4	10	25	entered 1995 UEFA Intertoto Cup
6	Sion	14	5	2	7	24	25	−1	12	24	Swiss Cup winners, qualified for 1995–96 Cup Winners' Cup
7	Basel	14	7	0	7	20	19	+1	10	24	entered 1995 UEFA Intertoto Cup
8	Lausanne-Sport	14	1	1	12	11	35	−24	12	15	

Source: rsssf.com

Grasshopper Club won the championship title and this was GC's 23rd title to this date.

=== Swiss Cup ===
In the 1994–95 Swiss Cup, the first-tier teams were granted byes for the first two cup rounds, eight of these teams joined the competition in round three. The four teams that were engaged im the European competitions were granted byes for the third round as well and therefore FCA joind the competition in round four.

18 March 1995 Round 4	Basel	3–0	Aarau	St. Jakob Stadium, Basel
20:00	Zuffi 45' (1:0); Walker (yellow card) 85'; Hertig 86' (2:0); Šarić 88' (3:0)	FCB summary FCA summary	(yellow card) 72' Bader	Attendance: 12,000; Referee: (Switzerland) Kurt Zuppinger (Bremgarten, Aargau)
Note: FCB without Jeiztiner, Smajic (injured). FCA without Christ (suspended), Heldmann, Wyss (injured).

Sion won the cup and this was the Sion's seventh cup title in their seventh final to this date.

=== UEFA Cup ===
FCA had ended the previous season in fourth position in the domestic league. The top three places in the table were the slots for the UEFA competitions, but because the 1993–94 Swiss Cup winners, the Grasshopper Club, ended the season in second position in the league the UEFA slots were handed down one position. FCA were thus qualified for 1994–95 UEFA Cup preliminary round.

==== Preliminary round ====
9 August 1994 First leg	Aarau (Switzerland)	1–0	(Slovenia) Mura	Stadion Brügglifeld, Aarau
20:00	Brugnoli (yellow card) 47'; Kucharski 71'; Bühlmann (yellow card)	UEFA report FCA summary	(red card) 1' Gajser; (yellow card) 72' Cifer; (yellow card) 75' Poljšak	Attendance: 4,800; Referee: José Pratas (Portugal)

23 August 1994 Return leg	Mura (Slovenia)	0–1 (0–2 agg.)	(Switzerland) Aarau	Mestni stadion Fazanerija, Murska Sobota
17:30	Poljšak (yellow card) 17'; Cifer (yellow card) 38'	UEFA summary FCA summary	Skrzypczak 17'; (yellow card) 72' Pavličević	Attendance: 4,500; Referee: Géza Kiss (Hungary)

Aarau won 2–0 on aggregate and advanced to first round

==== First round ====
13 September 1994 First leg	Aarau (Switzerland)	0–0	(Portugal) Marítimo	Stadion Brügglifeld, Aarau
20:00	Skrzypczak (yellow card) 55'; Fink (yellow card) 68'; Pavličević (red card) 75'	Report; FCA summary	(yellow card) 37' Duarte; (red card) 47' Soares; (yellow card) 76' Bunbury	Attendance: 5,400; Referee: Karol Ihring (Slovakia)

27 September 1994 Return leg	Marítimo (Portugal)	1–0 (1–0 agg.)	(Switzerland) Aarau	Estádio dos Barreiros, Funchal
19:00	Costa (yellow card); Paulo Alves 62'; Flores (yellow card)	Report	(yellow card) 18' Christ; (yellow card) 77' Bühlmann	Attendance: 9,000

Marítimo won 1–0 on aggregate

=== Sepione Cup ===
13 July 1994 Semi-final	Aarau	2–0	St. Gallen	Sportplatz Moos, Balsthal
	Goal
Note: The Sempione Cup was a club tournament played in summer at Sportanlage Moos, Balsthal, during the years 1987 to 2004.

16 July 1994 Sepione Cup final	Basel	1–1 (4–5 p)	Aarau	Sportplatz Moos, Balsthal
20:00	Olsen (yellow card) 23'; Steingruber 81' (1:1)	FCB summary	27' (0:1) Fink; (yellow card) 42' Bader; (yellow card) 55' Mazenauer; (yellow card) 61' Heldmann; (yellow card) 72' Studer; (yellow card) 90+1' Christ	Attendance: 2,100; Referee: (Switzerland) Kurt Zuppinger (Bremgarten, Aargau)
	Penalties
	Rey (penalty scored); Steingruber (penalty missed); Walker (penalty scored); Cantaluppi (penalty scored); Zuffi (penalty scored); Gigon (penalty missed)		(penalty scored) Skrzypczak; (penalty missed) Kucharski; (penalty scored) Heldmann; (penalty scored) Burri; (penalty scored) Mazenauer; (penalty scored) Hoehener
Note: FCB were without Grüter, Ceccaroni, Jeitziner and Smajic (all injured). FCA were without Bühlmann (injured). The Sempione Cup was a club tournament played in summer at Sportanlage Moos, Balsthal, during the years 1987 to 2004.

== Sources ==
- Switzerland 1994–95 at RSSSF
- FCA squad 1994–95 at arowa.ch

Preceded by 1993–94	FC Aarau seasons	Succeeded by 1995–96
