= 2000–01 Swiss Cup =

Tournament details
- Country: Switzerland

Final positions
- Champions: Servette
- Runners-up: Yverdon-Sport

The 2000–01 Swiss Cup was the 76th season of Switzerland's annual cup competition. It began on 9 August with the first game of Round 1 and ended on Sunday 10 June 2001 with the final held at the newly opened St. Jakob-Park in Basel. The cup winners earned a place in the first round of the UEFA Cup.

== Overview ==
This seasons cup competition began on 9 August with the first game of the first round, but the majority of the games were played on the week-end 12–13 August. The competition ended on Sunday 10 June 2001 with the final, which this year was not held at the former Wankdorf Stadium, but in the brand new St. Jakob-Park in Basel. The Swiss Football Association (SFV-ASF) had modified the format of the Swiss football league system to the beginning of the season. The eldest Swiss youth U-20 championship was despanded, these teams were all up-graded to U-21 teams and were eligible to play in the third or fourth-tier and were also eligible to play in the Swiss Cup. The four top teams from last seasons U-20 championship advanced to the third tier 2000–01 Swiss 1. Liga, the other teams advanced to the newly created 2. Liga Interregional (fourth tier). The size of the 1. Liga had been reduced to 48 teams, previously this had been 56 teams.

The 48 clubs from the 2000–01 Swiss 1. Liga were granted byes for the first round and were to join the competition in the second round. The 12 clubs from the Nationalliga B were granted byes for the first three rounds. The 12 clubs from the Nationalliga A were granted byes for the first four rounds. The winners of the cup qualified themselves for the first round of the first round of the UEFA Cup in the following season.

When possible, the draw respected regionalities and the lower classed team was granted home advantage. In the entire competition, the matches were played in a single knockout format. In the event of a draw after 90 minutes, the match went into extra time. In the event of a draw at the end of extra time, a penalty shoot-out was to decide which team qualified for the next round. No replays were foreseen in the entire competition.

== Round 1 ==
In the first round a total of 130 amateur clubs participated from the fourth-tier and lower. The sole reserve team to qualify was that from FC Echallens, but the new U-21 teams also qualified. The draw respected regionalities, when possible, and the lower classed team was granted home advantage.

Team 1	Score	Team 2
9 August 2000
FC Wetzikon	1–2	FC Beringen
11 August 2000
FC Apples-Ballens	1–3	Gland
Echallens II	3–3 (a.e.t.) (7–6 p)	FC Epalinges
FC Hochdorf	1–4	Team Aargau U21
FC Espagnol LS	5–6 (a.e.t.)	FC Lancy-Sports
12 August 2000
Düdingen	3–1	Dürrenast
FC Ostermundigen	2–3	Köniz
FC Kirchberg (SG)	3–0	Bazenheid
FC Kirchberg (BE)	0–1	FC Aarberg
FC Collex-Bossy	0–5	FC Renens
Baulmes	2–1	FC La Tour/Le Pâquier
Frauenfeld	2–1	FC Uzwil
A.P. Genève	1–4	Montreux-Sports
FC Winkeln (SG)	4–2 (a.e.t.)	FC Wülflingen
FC Diepoldsau	1–2 (a.e.t.)	FC Grabs
FC Lutry	4–1	FC Marin-Sports
CS Romontois	5–1	FC Stade Payerne
FC Brig	0–4	FC Salgesch
FC Visp	2–1	US Collombey-Muraz
FC Klus-Balstahl	1–3	US Boncourt
FC Porrentruy	3–4	FC Riehen
FC Weissenstein BE	1–2 (a.e.t.)	FC Überstorf
Chur	4–0	FC St. Margrethen
SC Balerna	1–2	Lugano U-21
FC Küssnacht am Rigi	0–3	Biaschesi
AC Vallemaggia	2–1	FC Ascona
FC Champagne-Sports	2–0	FC Deportivo La Chaux-de-Fonds
FC La Sarraz-Eclépens	1–2	FC Châtel-St-Denis
Brühl	8–5 (a.e.t.)	Winterthur U-21
FC Baar	0–3	FC Schmerikon
FC Wittenbach	2–0	Cham
Basel U-21	7–0	FC Alle
Zofingen	0–3	Luzern U-21
FC Rothenburg	2–2 (a.e.t.) (5–2 p)	FC Gerlafingen
FC Lenzburg	3–1	Ibach
FC Schüpfheim	1–4	FC Meggen
Binningen	0–3	Old Boys
13 August 2000
FC Fully	1–2	Sion U-21
Herisau	4–2 (a.e.t.)	FC Amriswil
SV Lyss	3–1	FC Schönbühl
FC Jegenstorf	1–3 (a.e.t.)	Bümpliz
FC Langenthal	4–3 (a.e.t.)	Herzogenbuchsee
CS La Tour-de-Peilz	2–3	Xamax U-21
FC Aurore Bienne	3–1	FC Orpund
FC Fislisbach	5–0	SK Jugoslavija ZH
FC Wiesendangen	3–4 (a.e.t.)	FC Fortuna (SG)
FC Regensdorf	3–1	FC Affoltern am Albis
Höngg	3–1	FC Wiedikon
FC Montlingen	3–1	FC Rüti
FC Liestal	3–0	FC Bellach
FC Bremgarten	0–4	SC Emmen
FC Centro Gallego	0–7	Bülach
FC Dübendorf	1–5	FC Seefeld Zürich
Signal FC (Bernex)	4–4 (a.e.t.) (5–6 p)	FC Dardania Lausanne
CS Italien GE	2–2 (a.e.t.) (5–7 p)	ES Malley
FC Italia Nyon	0–3	FC Étoile-Laconnex
Cortaillod	6–0	FC Cornaux
FC Bramois	1–2	FC Savièse
FC Muri	4–2	FC Brugg
FC Mönchalttorf	1–2	Blue Stars
FC Court	1–1 (a.e.t.) (1–4 p)	FC Deitingen
FC Effretikon	5–3	FC Kilchberg-Rüschlikon
FC Russikon	0–11	Zürich U-21
FC Aesch	1–3	Nordstern Basel
FC Stabio	2–1	FC Bodio

== Round 2 ==
The 48 teams from the 2000–01 Swiss 1. Liga, that had been granted byes for the first round, joined the competition in this the second round. They were seeded and cound not be drawn against each other. The draw respected regionalities, when possible, and the lower classed team was granted the home advantage. Here it came to the novum that both the reserve team and the first team from FC Echallens were drawn against each other.

Team 1	Score	Team 2
23 August 2000
Xamax U-21	3–2 (a.e.t.)	La Chaux-de-Fonds
25 August 2000
FC Winkeln (SG)	2–0	SV Schaffhausen
Düdingen	4–0	Bümpliz
CS Romontois	4–3	Bulle
FC Echallens II	1–0	FC Echallens I
FC Châtel-St-Denis	0–3	Colombier
FC Lancy-Sports	1–3	Chênois
FC Regensdorf	1–2 (a.e.t.)	Red Star
Gland	2–5	Stade Lausanne Ouchy
26 August 2000
FC Visp	0–1	FC Savièse
FC Seefeld Zürich	4–3 (a.e.t.)	FC Schwamendingen
FC Beringen	1–3	St. Gallen U-21
Frauenfeld	0–2 (a.e.t.)	Kreuzlingen
FC Langenthal	2–4	Muttenz
FC Champagne-Sports	1–12	Serrières
Blue Stars	1–3	Zug 94
Chur	1–4	Rapperswil-Jona
FC Étoile-Laconnex	3–9 (a.e.t.)	Stade Nyonnais
ES Malley	2–1	US Terre Sainte
FC Grabs	1–3	FC Horgen
Old Boys	0–4	Schötz
FC Meggen	1–1 (a.e.t.) (4–5 p)	FC Fislisbach
FC Schmerikon	0–7	Tuggen
FC Lutry	1–6	Vevey Sports
FC Montlingen	4–4 (a.e.t.) (4–2 p)	Freienbach
FC Renens	0–5	Servette U-21
SV Lyss	2–1	Münsingen
FC Deitingen	0–7	Biel-Bienne
FC Wittenbach	3–1	FC Rorschach
Brühl	1–1 (a.e.t.) (3–5 p)	FC Schaffhausen
FC Kirchberg	0–2	Gossau
FC Effretikon	1–4	Luzern U-21
Montreux-Sports	0–1	Grand-Lancy
FC Salgesch	0–3	Martigny-Sports
FC Rothenburg	4–3	FC Sursee
SC Emmen	1–5	Zürich U-21
Cortaillod	0–3	Bex
Herisau	2–6	FC Widnau
Lugano U-21	0–1	Buochs
US Boncourt	0–3	Fribourg
FC Überstorf	1–7 (a.e.t.)	Basel U-21
FC Liestal	1–1 (a.e.t.) (4–2 p)	Köniz
FC Stabio	2–4	Malcantone Agno
27 August 2000
Baulmes	2–4	Lausanne-Sport U-21
FC Aurore Bienne	0–1	Concordia Basel
Höngg	1–4	YF Juventus
Team Aargau U21	5–1	Grasshopper Club U-21
FC Riehen	0–3	Nordstern Basel
Sion U-21	2–0	Naters
FC Dardania Lausanne	0–6	Meyrin
FC Muri	0–2	FC Altstetten Zürich
FC Lenzburg	0–2	Wohlen
FC Fortuna (SG)	2–5	Bülach
FC Aarberg	1–4	Grenchen
AC Vallemaggia	2–0	Mendrisio
Biaschesi	1–0	Chiasso

== Round 3 ==
Team 1	Score	Team 2
8 September 2000
CS Romontois	4–1	Düdingen
FC Wittenbach	0–4	Rapperswil-Jona
9 September 2000
Lausanne-Sport U-21	1–2	Grand-Lancy
Stade Lausanne Ouchy	3–6 (a.e.t.)	FC Martigny-Sports
YF Juventus	3–1	FC Altstetten (Zürich)
Luzern U-21	2–0	Malcantone Agno
Team Aargau U21	2–2 (a.e.t.) (5–3 p)	Buochs
Bülach	1–6	Kreuzlingen
ES Malley	3–5	Vevey Sports
Serrières	2–3	Fribourg
Zürich U-21	2–1	Red Star
FC Montlingen	0–3	FC Horgen
Sion U-21	5–1	Stade Nyonnais
Bex	3–1	Servette U-21
FC Echallens II	1–2	Meyrin
FC Schaffhausen	2–0	FC Widnau
Basel U-21	4–1	Muttenz
FC Fislisbach	0–3	FC Winkeln (SG)
Tuggen	0–1	Gossau
10 September 2000
FC Rothenburg	0–2	Wohlen
Xamax U-21	2–0	Colombier
FC Liestal	0–3	Nordstern Basel
FC Savièse	2–7	Chênois
SV Lyss	1–2	Concordia Basel
Grenchen	3–3 (a.e.t.) (6–8 p)	Biel-Bienne
FC Seefeld Zürich	3–4	St. Gallen U-21
AC Vallemaggia	1–2	Schötz
Biaschesi	2–1 (a.e.t.)	Zug 94

== Round 4 ==
The teams from the 2000–01 Nationalliga B (NLB) were granted byes for the first three rounds and they joined the competition in the fourth round. These 12 teams were seeded and cound not be drawn against each other. The draw respected regionalities, when possible, and the lower classed team was granted home advantage.

=== Summary ===
Team 1	Score	Team 2
7 October 2000
Martigny-Sports	1–3	Young Boys
Gossau	0–6	Locarno
Xamax U-21	1–0 (a.e.t.)	Biel-Bienne
Schötz	1–1 (a.e.t.) (3–1 p)	Rapperswil-Jona
Luzern U-21	0–4	Kreuzlingen
Biaschesi	0–0 (a.e.t.) (3–0 p) )	Kriens
CS Romontois	1–9	Delémont
Grand-Lancy	0–2	Étoile-Carouge
Fribourg	2–0	Bex
Sion U-21	1–3	Meyrin
Nordstern Basel	1–2	Vevey Sports
Concordia Basel	1–3	Wangen bei Olten
Chênois	1–2	Thun
8 October 2000
Basel U-21	1–3 (a.e.t.)	Solothurn
FC Schaffhausen	3–1	YF Juventus
Team Aargau U21	2–1	Baden
FC Winkeln (SG)	0–6	Bellinzona
Zürich U-21	2–3	Wil
FC Horgen	0–1	Wohlen
St. Gallen U-21	1–2	Winterthur

=== Matches ===
7 October 2000

Martigny-Sports	1–3	Young Boys
Wiedmer 76' (1:0)	YB report	(yellow card) 21' Sermeter; (yellow card) 27' Disler; 83' (1:1) Sermeter; 86' (1:2) Fryand; 90' (1:3) Descloux

Stade d'Octodure, Martigny
Attendance: 800
Referee: (Switzerland) Meyer

7 October 2000
19:00

Chênois	1–2	Thun
Jetisi 44' (pen.)	RSSSF summary	36' (0:1) Rama; 88' (1:2) Berisha

Stade des Trois-Chêne, Thônex
Referee: (Switzerland) Urs Meier (Würenlos)

8 October 2000
14:30

Team Aargau U21	2–1	Baden
Degen 70' (1:0); Calvo 73' (2:0)	RSSSF summary	77' (pen. 2:1) Martinovic

Stadion Brügglifeld, Aarau
Attendance: 500
Referee: (Switzerland) Vincent Dafflon

== Round 5 ==
The 12 first-tier clubs from the 2000–01 Nationalliga A had been granted byes for the first four rounds and they joined the competition in this round. The first-tier teams were seeded and cound not be drawn against each other. The draw respected regionalities, when possible, and the lower classed team was granted home advantage.

=== Summary ===
Team 1	Score	Team 2
11 November 2000
Biaschesi	1–0	Kreuzlingen
FC Schaffhausen	1–1 (a.e.t.)(4–3 p)	Aarau
Meyrin	1–3	Servette
Young Boys	3–0	Sion
12 November 2000
Bellinzona	2–0	Grasshopper Club
Team Aargau U21	1–5	Luzern
Wohlen	1–2	Schötz
Fribourg	3–2 (a.e.t.)	Vevey Sports
Delémont	0–1 (a.e.t.)	Thun
Solothurn	0–1	Yverdon-Sport
17 November 2000
Wangen bei Olten	2–1	Xamax
18 February 2001
Winterthur	1–0	Lugano
Locarno	0–4	Zürich
Wil	1–3	St. Gallen
Xamax U-21	0–2	Lausanne-Sport
Étoile-Carouge	1–1 (a.e.t.) (8–9 p)	Basel

=== Matches ===
11 November 2000
16:30

FC Schaffhausen	1–1 (a.e.t.)	Aarau
Dos Santos 29' (1:0)	FCA summary	45' (1:1) Pavličević
Penalties
Leu (penalty scored); Rohrer (penalty scored); Gil Steven Ribeiro (penalty scored); Stoop (penalty scored)	4–3	(penalty missed) Ivanov; (penalty scored) Khomeriki; (penalty scored) Senn; (penalty scored) Pavličević; (penalty missed) Skrzypczak

Stadion Breite, Schaffhausen
Attendance: 1,1/2
Referee: (Switzerland) Dieter Schoch (Attiswil)

11 November 2000
16:30

Meyrin	1–3	Servette
Chedly 56' (1:0)	Servette summary	82' (1:1) Wolf; 88' (1:2) Wolf; 90' (1:3) Petrov

Stade des Arbères, Meyrin

11 November 2000
17:30

Young Boys	3–0	Sion
Sermeter 17' (1:0); Sekulovic (yellow card) 42'; Hänzi 50' (2:0); Sermeter 55' (3:0); Disler (yellow card) 55'	YB report	(red card) 65' Deumi

Wankdorf Stadium, Bern
Attendance: 5,400
Referee: (Switzerland) René Rogalla (Wallisellen)

12 November 2000
14:30

Bellinzona	2–0	Grasshopper Club
Tsawa 32' (1:0); Giuseppe Manfreda 54' (2:0)	RSSSF summary

Stadio Comunale Bellinzona, Bellinzona

12 November 2000
14:30

Solothurn	0–1	Yverdon-Sport
	RSSSF summary	80' (0:1) Gohouri

Stadion FC Solothurn, Solothurn

18 February 2001
14:30

Locarno	0–4	Zürich
	FCZ summary	11' (0:1) Kavelachvili; 23' (0:2) Giannini; 58' (0:3) Kavelachvili; 84' (0:4) Chihab

Stadio comunale Lido, Locarno
Attendance: 1,050
Referee: (Switzerland) Markus Nobs (Wohlen bei Bern)

18 February 2001
15:00

Etoile Carouge	1–1 (a.e.t.)	Basel
Ebe (yellow card) 33'; Villiot 66' (1:0); Besseyre (yellow card) 84'; Iglesias (yellow card) 111'	FCB summary	(yellow card) 37' Cantaluppi; 83' (1:1) H. Yakin
Penalties
Derivaz (penalty scored); Villiot (penalty scored); Ballon (penalty scored); Bell (penalty missed); Boughanem (penalty scored); Braizat (penalty scored); Stilz (penalty scored); Daquin (penalty scored); Morisod (penalty scored); Iglesias (penalty missed)	8–9	(penalty scored) H. Yakin; (penalty missed) Knez; (penalty scored) Tchouga; (penalty scored) Cantaluppi; (penalty scored) Magro; (penalty scored) Muff; (penalty scored) Savić; (penalty scored) Cravero; (penalty scored) Tum; (penalty scored) Ceccaroni

Stade de la Fontenette, Carouge
Attendance: 1,185
Referee: (Switzerland) Guido Wildhaber (Kerzers)

== Round 6 ==
=== Summary ===
Team 1	Score	Team 2
18 February 2001
Thun	3–0	Luzern
4 March 2001
Bellinzona	2–3	Basel
7 March 2001
Schötz	0–1	Lausanne-Sport
14 March 2001
Wangen bei Olten	1–6	Young Boys
15 March 2001
Fribourg	1–7	St. Gallen
Biaschesi	1–3	Servette
Yverdon-Sport	1–0	Zürich
23 March 2001
FC Schaffhausen	2–3	Winterthur

=== Matches ===
18 February 2001
14:30

Thun	3–0	Luzern
Okpala 1' (1:0); Okpala 43' (2:0); Jurendic 49' (3:0)	RSSSF summary

Stadion Lachen, Thun
Attendance: 2,550
Referee: (Switzerland) Reto Rutz (Amriswil)

4 March 2001
14:30

Bellinzona	2–3	Basel
Tarone 18'; Manfreda 52'; Edusei (yellow card) 56'; Tsawa (yellow card) 76'; Bugnard (yellow card) 89' (yellow-red card) 90+4'	FCB summary	31', 76' Tchouga; (yellow card) 50' H. Yakin; 70' Magro

Stadio Comunale Bellinzona
Attendance: 3,000
Referee: (Switzerland) Urs Meier (Würenlos)

7 March 2001
19:30

Schötz	0–1	Lausanne-Sport
	RSSSF summary	80' (o.g.) (Blagojevic)

Sportplatz Wissenhusen, Schötz

14 March 2001
19:30

Wangen bei Olten	1–6	Young Boys
Renfer 29' (1:1); Ibrahim (red card) 45'	YB report	15' (0:1) Petrosyan; 59' (1:2) Tholot; (yellow card) 63' Häberli; (yellow card) 66' Mitreski; 74' (1:3) Häberli; 76' (1:4) Wallon; 82' (1:5) Wallon; (yellow card) 84' Burri; 85' (1:6) Burri

Sportplatz Chrüzmatt, Wangen bei Olten
Attendance: 1,350
Referee: (Switzerland) Guido Wildhaber (Kerzers)

15 March 2001
19:00

Fribourg	1–7	St. Gallen
Tona 7' (1:0)	RSSSF summary	14' (1:1) Pinnelli; 18' (1:2) Stefanovic; 20' (1:3) Jefferson; 48' (1:4) Stefanovic; 63' (1:5) Müller; 66' (1:6) Jefferson; 78' (1:7) Contini

Stade Universitaire Saint-Léonard, Fribourg

15 March 2001
19:30

Biaschesi	1–3	Servette
Quatrale 63' (1:2)	Servette summary	17' (0:1) Obradovic; 53' (0:2) Diogo; 74' (1:3) Fournier

Campo Sportivo "Al Vallone", Biasca
Attendance: 1,500
Referee: (Switzerland) Martin Salm (Veltheim, Aargau)

15 March 2001
19:30

Yverdon-Sport	1–0	Zürich
Gil Bala (yellow card); Gil Bala 81' (1:0); Bamba (yellow card) 83'	FCZ summary	(yellow card) 73' Chihab

Stade Municipal, Yverdon
Attendance: 650
Referee: (Switzerland) Andreas Schluchter (Schönenbuch)

23 March 2001
19:00

FC Schaffhausen	2–3	Winterthur
Niederhäuser 76' (1:3); Jukic 90' (2:3)	RSSSF summary	4' (0:1) Ramsauer; 38' (0:2) Maslov; 73' (0:3) Ramsauer

Stadion Breite, Schaffhausen

== Quarter-finals ==
=== Summary ===
Team 1	Score	Team 2
11 April 2001
Lausanne-Sport	0–0 (a.e.t.) (7–6 p)	Basel
Winterthur	1–3	St. Gallen
Young Boys	1–1 (a.e.t.) (2–3 p)	Servette
12 April 2001
Thun	1–1 (a.e.t.) (2–4 p)	Yverdon-Sport

=== Matches ===
11 April 2001
19:30

Lausanne-Sport	0–0 (a.e.t.)	Basel
Christ (yellow card) 47'; Meyer (yellow card) 71' (yellow-red card) 83'; Simon (yellow card) 76'	FCB summary
Penalties
Lombardo (penalty scored); Christ (penalty scored); Simon (penalty scored); Puce (penalty scored); Santini (penalty scored); Hellebuyck (penalty scored); Panow (penalty scored)	7–6	(penalty scored) M. Yakin; (penalty scored) Cantaluppi; (penalty scored) Ergić; (penalty scored) Kreuzer; (penalty scored) Huggel; (penalty scored) Savić; (penalty missed) Ceccaroni

Olympique de la Pontaise, Lausanne
Attendance: 3,500
Referee: (Switzerland) Reto Rutz (Amriswil)

11 April 2001
19:30

Winterthur	1–3	St. Gallen
Zamtaradze (yellow card) 37'; Brugnoli 75' (1:3)	RSSSF summary	27' (0:1) Zellweger; 47' (0:2) Contini; 72' (0:3) Gane

Schützenwiese, Winterthur
Attendance: 4,880
Referee: (Switzerland) Guido Wildhaber (Kerzers)

11 April 2001
19:30

Young Boys	1–1 (a.e.t.)	Servette
Häberli 35' (1:1); Sekulovic (yellow card) 40'; Rotanzi (red card) 47'	YB summary Servette summary	14' (0:1) Petrov; (yellow card) 38' Pizzinat; (yellow card) 43' Lonfat; (yellow card) 78' Lachor; (yellow card) 84' Thurre; (yellow card) 85' Bah; (yellow card) 90' Wolf
Penalties
Sermeter (penalty scored); Disler (penalty missed); Wallon (penalty scored); Hänzi (penalty missed); Vardanyan (penalty missed)	2–3	(penalty missed) Wolf; (penalty scored) Lonfat; (penalty missed) Petrov; (penalty scored) Lachor; (penalty scored) Oruma

Wankdorf Stadium, Bern
Attendance: 7,000
Referee: (Switzerland) Massimo Busacca (Monte Carasso/Bellinzona)

12 April 2001
17:00

Thun	1–1 (a.e.t.)	Yverdon-Sport
(Cavin) 9' (o.g.)	RSSSF summary	21' (o.g.)(Haller)
Penalties
Berisha (penalty missed); Born (penalty scored); Rama (penalty missed); Haller (penalty scored)	2–4	(penalty scored) Peço; (penalty scored) Andreoli; (penalty missed) Friedli; (penalty scored) Devolz; (penalty scored) Jenny

Stadion Lachen, Thun
Attendance: 1,660
Referee: (Switzerland) Nicole Petignat (Courgenay)

== Semi-finals ==
=== Summary ===
Team 1	Score	Team 2
3 May 2001
Servette	1–0	St. Gallen
Lausanne-Sport	0–0 (a.e.t.) (3–4 p)	Yverdon-Sport

=== Matches ===
3 May 2001

Servette	1–0	St. Gallen
Oruma (yellow card) 42'; Frei 77' (1:0)	Servette summary	(yellow card) 30' Colacino; (yellow card) 35' Guido; (yellow card) 64' Zellweger

Charmilles Stadium, Geneva
Attendance: 4,816
Referee: (Switzerland) Andreas Schluchter (Schönenbuch)

3 May 2001

Lausanne-Sport	0–0 (a.e.t.)	Yverdon-Sport
Karlen (yellow card) 28'; Puce (yellow card) 112'	RSSSF summary	(yellow card) 25' Gohouri; (yellow card) 56' Peço; (yellow card) 82' Andreoli
Penalties
Lombardo (penalty scored); Christ (penalty scored); Kuzba (penalty scored); Puce (penalty missed); Thiaw (penalty missed); Simon (penalty missed)	3–4	(penalty missed) Peço; (penalty scored) Andreoli; (penalty scored) Jenny; (penalty scored) Rochat; (penalty missed) Cavalo; (penalty scored) Njohole

Olympique de la Pontaise, Lausanne
Attendance: 3,150
Referee: (Switzerland) Philippe Leuba (Chexbres)

== Final ==
The winners of the first drawn semi-final was considered as home team in the final.

=== Summary ===
Team 1	Score	Team 2
10 June 2001
Servette	3–0	Yverdon-Sport

=== Telegram ===
10 June 2001
15:00

Servette	3–0	Yverdon-Sport
Lonfat 11'; Petrov 29'; Obradovic (yellow card) 31'; Frei 55'	Report	(yellow card) 83' Gil Bala

St. Jakob-Park, Basel
Attendance: 20,000
Referee: (Switzerland) Markus Nobs

Servette won the cup and this was the club's seventh cup title to this date.

== Further in Swiss football ==
- 2000-01 Nationalliga A
- 2000-01 Nationalliga B
- 2000-01 Swiss 1. Liga

== Sources and references ==
- Official site (in German)
- Switzerland 2000/01 at RSSSF

Preceded by 1999–2000	Seasons in Swiss Cup	Succeeded by 2001-02
