= 2000–01 BSC Young Boys season =

Young Boys
2000–01 season
- Chairman: Martin Maraggia (until November); Walter Theiler
- Manager: Marco Schällibaum
- Stadium: Wankdorf Stadium
- Nationalliga B: 1st
- Promotion play-offs: 4th (promoted)
- Swiss Cup: Quarter-finals
- Top goalscorer: League: Reto Burri (12); All: Reto Burri (13)
- Biggest win: Young Boys 8–2 Thun
- Biggest defeat: Winterthur 3–0 Young Boys

The 2000–01 BSC Young Boys season was the club's 103rd season in existence and the club's second consecutive season in the second division of Swiss football. In addition to the domestic league, Young Boys will participate in this season's edition of the Swiss Cup. The season covers the period from 1 July 2000 to 30 June 2001.

== Pre-season and friendlies ==
Win Draw Loss

17 February 2001 Friendly	Servette (Switzerland)	6–1	(Switzerland) Young Boys

== Competitions ==
=== Overview ===
Competition	First match	Last match	Starting round	Final position	Record							
Competition	First match	Last match	Starting round	Final position	Pld	W	D	L	GF	GA	GD	Win %
Nationalliga B	15 July 2000	26 November 2000	Matchday 1	Winners	22	13	6	3	42	20	+22	59.09
Promotion play-offs	24 February 2001	27 May 2001	Matchday 1	4th	14	7	4	3	17	14	+3	50.00
Swiss Cup	7 October 2000	11 April 2001	Round of 64	Quarter-finals	4	3	1	0	13	3	+10	75.00
Total					40	23	11	6	72	37	+35	57.50

Source: Competitions

=== Nationalliga B ===
==== League table ====
Pos	Team	Pld	W	D	L	GF	GA	GD	Pts
1	Young Boys	22	13	6	3	42	20	+22	45
2	Wil	22	14	3	5	47	28	+19	45
3	Winterthur	22	11	8	3	41	21	+20	41
4	Bellinzona	22	11	5	6	40	27	+13	38
5	Thun	22	10	5	7	46	39	+7	35

Source: RSSSF
Rules for classification: 1) points; 2) goal difference; 3) number of goals scored.

==== Results summary ====
Overall								Home						Away					
Pld	W	D	L	GF	GA	GD	Pts	W	D	L	GF	GA	GD	W	D	L	GF	GA	GD
0	0	0	0	0	0	0	0	0	0	0	0	0	0	0	0	0	0	0	0

==== Results by round ====
Round	1	2	3	4	5	6	7	8	9	10	11	12	13	14	15	16	17	18	19	20	21	22
Ground	H	A	H	A	A	H	A	H	H	A	H	A	H	A	H	A	H	A	H	A	H	A
Result	W	W	D	L	W	W	W	W	W	D	D	D	W	L	W	D	W	W	W	D	W	L
Position	2	1	1																			

A = Away; H = Home; W = Win; D = Draw; L = Loss

==== Matches ====
15 July 2000 1	Young Boys	1–0	Kriens	Bern
				Stadium: Wankdorf Stadium

18 July 2000 2	Solothurn	0–3	Young Boys

22 July 2000 3	Young Boys	1–1	Bellinzona	Bern
				Stadium: Wankdorf Stadium

29 July 2000 4	Delemont	3–1	Young Boys

2 August 2000 5	Wil	0–2	Young Boys

5 August 2000 6	Young Boys	3–1	Carouge	Bern
				Stadium: Wankdorf Stadium

11 August 2000 7	Thun	1–4	Young Boys

15 August 2000 8	Young Boys	2–1	Wangen	Bern
				Stadium: Wankdorf Stadium

19 August 2000 9	Young Boys	4–2	Baden	Bern
				Stadium: Wankdorf Stadium

26 August 2000 10	Locarno	1–1	Young Boys

2 September 2000 11	Young Boys	0–0	Winterthur	Bern
				Stadium: Wankdorf Stadium

9 September 2000 12	Wangen	1–1	Young Boys

16 September 2000 13	Young Boys	2–1	Wil	Bern
				Stadium: Wankdorf Stadium

23 September 2000 14	Kriens	1–0	Young Boys

30 September 2000 15	Young Boys	1–0	Solothurn	Bern
				Stadium: Wankdorf Stadium

15 October 2000 16	Bellinzona	2–2	Young Boys

21 October 2000 17	Young Boys	1–0	Delemont	Bern
				Stadium: Wankdorf Stadium

28 October 2000 18	Carouge	0–3	Young Boys

1 November 2000 19	Young Boys	8–2	Thun	Bern
				Stadium: Wankdorf Stadium

5 November 2000 20	Baden	0–0	Young Boys

19 November 2000 21	Young Boys	2–1	Locarno	Bern
				Stadium: Wankdorf Stadium

26 November 2000 22	Winterthur	3–0	Young Boys

=== Promotion play-offs ===
Pos	Team	Pld	W	D	L	GF	GA	GD	Pts
2	Aarau (P)	14	7	3	4	23	15	+8	24
3	Luzern (P)	14	7	3	4	24	18	+6	24
4	Young Boys (P)	14	7	3	4	17	14	+3	24
5	Yverdon-Sport (R)	14	4	7	3	23	20	+3	19
6	Winterthur (R)	14	5	2	7	18	21	−3	17

Source: RSSSF
Rules for classification: 1) points; 2) goal difference; 3) number of goals scored.
(P) Promoted; (R) Relegated

==== Results summary ====
Overall								Home						Away					
Pld	W	D	L	GF	GA	GD	Pts	W	D	L	GF	GA	GD	W	D	L	GF	GA	GD
0	0	0	0	0	0	0	0	0	0	0	0	0	0	0	0	0	0	0	0

==== Results by round ====
Round	1	2	3	4	5	6	7	8	9	10	11	12	13	14
Ground	A	H	A	H	H	A	A	H	H	A	A	H	A	H
Result	D	W	L	D	W	W	L	W	W	L	D	W	L	W
Position														

A = Away; H = Home; W = Win; D = Draw; L = Loss

==== Matches ====
24 February 2001 1	Wil	0–0	Young Boys

7 March 2001 2	Young Boys	1–0	Aarau	Bern
				Stadium: Wankdorf Stadium

11 March 2001 3	Winterthur	2–1	Young Boys

18 March 2001 4	Young Boys	0–0	Xamax	Bern
				Stadium: Wankdorf Stadium

31 March 2001 5	Young Boys	3–2	Yverdon	Bern
				Stadium: Wankdorf Stadium

7 April 2001 6	Bellinzona	2–3	Young Boys

16 April 2001 7	Luzern	1–0	Young Boys

28 April 2001 9	Young Boys	1–0	Bellinzona	Bern
				Stadium: Wankdorf Stadium

1 May 2001 8	Young Boys	2–0	Luzern	Bern
				Stadium: Wankdorf Stadium

6 May 2001 9	Yverdon	4–2	Young Boys

12 May 2001 11	Xamax	1–1	Young Boys

15 May 2001 12	Young Boys	2–0	Winterthur	Bern
				Stadium: Wankdorf Stadium

20 May 2001 13	Aarau	2–0	Young Boys

27 May 2001 14	Young Boys	1–0	Wil	Bern
				Stadium: Wankdorf Stadium

=== Swiss Cup ===
7 October 2000 Round of 64	Martigny	1–3	Young Boys	Martigny
				Attendance: 800; Referee: Meyer

11 November 2000 Round of 32	Young Boys	3–0	Sion	Bern
				Stadium: Wankdorf Stadium; Attendance: 5,400; Referee: Rogalla

14 March 2001 Round of 16	Wangen	1–6	Young Boys	Wangen bei Olten
				Attendance: 1,350; Referee: Wildhaber

11 April 2001 Quarter-finals	Young Boys	1–1 (a.e.t.) (3–4 p)	Servette	Bern
	Häberli 35'		Petrov 14'	Stadium: Wankdorf Stadium; Attendance: 7,000; Referee: Massimo Busacca
