= 2000–01 Swiss 1. Liga =

1. Liga
- Season: 2000–01
- Champions: Group 1: Serrières; Group 2: Concordia; Group 3: Vaduz
- Promoted: Concordia; Vaduz
- Relegated: Group 1: Martigny-Sports; Terre Sainte; Group 2: Horgen; Muttenz; Group 3: Widnau; Sursee
- Matches: 3 times 240 plus 9 play-offs

The 2000–01 Swiss 1. Liga was the 69th season of this league since its creation in 1931. The 1. Liga was the third tier of the Swiss football league system and it was also the highest level of amateur football.

== Format ==
There were 48 teams in this division this season, including four U-21 teams, which were the eldest youth teams of the professional clubs in the Super League and the Challenge League. The 1. Liga was divided into three regional groups, each with 16 teams. Within each group, the teams would play a double round-robin to decide their positions in the league. The three group winners and the three runners-up then contested a play-off for the two promotion slots. The U-21 teams were not eligible for promotion and could not compete the play-offs. The two last placed teams in each group were directly relegated to the 2. Liga Interregional.

== Group 1 ==
=== Teams ===
Club	Canton	Stadium	Capacity
FC Bex	Vaud	Relais	2,000
CS Chênois	Geneva	Stade des Trois-Chêne	8,000
FC Colombier	Neuchâtel	Stade des Chézards	2,500
FC Echallens	Vaud	Sportplatz 3 Sapins	2,000
Grand-Lancy FC	Geneva	Stade de Marignac	1,500
FC La Chaux-de-Fonds	Neuchâtel	Centre Sportif de la Charrière	12,700
Lausanne-Sport U-21	Vaud	Stade Olympique de la Pontaise	15,700
FC Martigny-Sports	Valais	Stade d'Octodure	2,500
FC Meyrin	Geneva	Stade des Arbères	9,000
FC Naters	Valais	Sportanlage Stapfen	3,000
FC Serrières	Neuchâtel	Pierre-à-Bot	1,700
Servette U-21	Geneva	Stade de Genève	30,084
FC Stade Lausanne Ouchy	Vaud	Centre sportif de Vidy	1,000
FC Stade Nyonnais	Vaud	Stade de Colovray	7,200
US Terre Sainte	Vaud	Centre Sportif des Rojalets	1,400
Vevey Sports	Vaud	Stade de Copet	4,000

=== Final league table ===
Pos	Team	Pld	W	D	L	GF	GA	GD	Pts	Qualification or relegation
1	FC Serrières	30	16	10	4	45	27	+18	58	Play-off to Challenge League
2	FC Stade Lausanne Ouchy	30	16	7	7	50	29	+21	55	Play-off to Challenge League
3	Servette U-21	30	16	6	8	54	33	+21	54	
4	FC Colombier	30	14	9	7	43	37	+6	51	
5	CS Chênois	30	12	11	7	60	44	+16	47	
6	Vevey Sports	30	11	10	9	56	39	+17	43	
7	FC Bex	30	11	8	11	51	50	+1	41	
8	FC Meyrin	30	11	8	11	38	40	−2	41	
9	FC La Chaux-de-Fonds	30	11	7	12	44	53	−9	40	
10	FC Naters	30	10	9	11	46	51	−5	39	
11	Lausanne-Sport U-21	30	10	4	16	43	48	−5	34	
12	Grand-Lancy FC	30	8	10	12	38	54	−16	34	
13	FC Echallens	30	9	5	16	36	44	−8	32	
14	FC Stade Nyonnais	30	8	8	14	48	63	−15	32	
15	FC Martigny-Sports	30	8	7	15	43	50	−7	31	Relegation to 2. Liga Interregional
16	US Terre Sainte	30	6	7	17	31	64	−33	25	Relegation to 2. Liga Interregional

Source: Erste Liga official website
Rules for classification: 1) Points; 2) Goal difference within the league or play-off for qualifiers.

== Group 2 ==
=== Teams ===
Club	Canton	Stadium	Capacity
FC Altstetten	Zürich	Buchlern	1,000
FC Biel-Bienne	Bern	Stadion Gurzelen	15,000
FC Bulle	Fribourg	Stade de Bouleyres	7,000
FC Concordia Basel	Basel-City	Stadion Rankhof	7,000
FC Fribourg	Fribourg	Stade Universitaire	9,000
Grasshopper Club U-21	Zürich	GC/Campus Niederhasli	2,000
FC Grenchen	Solothurn	Stadium Brühl	15,100
FC Horgen	Zürich	Waldegg	1,000
FC Münsingen	Bern	Sportanlage Sandreutenen	1,400
SV Muttenz	Basel-Country	Sportplatz Margelacker	3,200
FC Red Star Zürich	Zürich	Allmend Brunau	2,000
FC Schaffhausen	Schaffhausen	Stadion Breite	7,300
SV Schaffhausen	Schaffhausen	Sportplatz Bühl	1,000
FC Schwamendingen	Zürich	Sportanlage Heerenschürli	1,522
FC Wohlen	Aargau	Stadion Niedermatten	3,734
SC YF Juventus	Zürich	Utogrund	2,850

=== Final league table ===
Pos	Team	Pld	W	D	L	GF	GA	GD	Pts	Qualification or relegation
1	FC Concordia Basel	30	18	8	4	58	30	+28	62	Play-off to Challenge League
2	FC Schaffhausen	30	17	9	4	55	26	+29	60	Play-off to Challenge League
3	SC Young Fellows Juventus	30	16	7	7	56	35	+21	55	
4	FC Altstetten	30	15	8	7	48	31	+17	53	
5	FC Grenchen	30	12	11	7	60	34	+26	47	
6	FC Red Star Zürich	30	13	7	10	41	38	+3	46	
7	FC Fribourg	30	10	10	10	47	39	+8	40	
8	FC Münsingen	30	8	12	10	36	43	−7	36	
9	FC Biel-Bienne	30	9	8	13	41	58	−17	35	
10	FC Wohlen	30	9	7	14	50	48	+2	34	
11	FC Schwamendingen	30	9	7	14	45	59	−14	34	
12	FC Bulle	30	9	5	16	41	64	−23	32	
13	SV Schaffhausen	30	7	10	13	36	61	−25	31	
14	Grasshopper Club U-21	30	7	9	14	44	48	−4	30	
15	FC Horgen	30	7	8	15	42	57	−15	29	Relegation to 2. Liga Interregional
16	SV Muttenz	30	7	8	15	41	70	−29	29	Relegation to 2. Liga Interregional

Source: Erste Liga official website
Rules for classification: 1) Points; 2) Goal difference within the league, or play-off for qualifiers.

== Group 3 ==
=== Teams ===
Club	Canton	Stadium	Capacity
SC Buochs	Nidwalden	Stadion Seefeld	5,000
FC Chiasso	Ticino	Stadio Comunale Riva IV	4,000
FC Freienbach	Schwyz	Chrummen	4,500
FC Gossau	St. Gallen	Sportanlage Buechenwald	3,500
FC Kreuzlingen	Thurgau	Sportplatz Hafenareal	1,200
FC Malcantone Agno	Ticino	Cornaredo Stadium	6,330
FC Mendrisio	Ticino	Centro Sportivo Comunale	4,000
FC Rapperswil-Jona	St. Gallen	Stadion Grünfeld	2,500
FC Rorschach	Schwyz	Sportplatz Kellen	1,000
FC Schötz	Lucerne	Sportplatz Wissenhusen	1,750
St. Gallen U-21	St. Gallen	Espenmoos	11,000
FC Sursee	Lucerne	Stadion Schlottermilch	3,500
FC Tuggen	Schwyz	Linthstrasse	2,800
FC Vaduz	Liechtenstein	Rheinpark Stadion	7,584
FC Widnau	St. Gallen	Sportanlage Aegeten	2,000
Zug 94	Zug	Herti Allmend Stadion	6,000

=== Final league table ===
Pos	Team	Pld	W	D	L	GF	GA	GD	Pts	Qualification or relegation
1	FC Vaduz	30	19	7	4	78	31	+47	64	Play-off to Challenge League
2	FC Schötz	30	17	7	6	61	32	+29	58	Play-off to Challenge League
3	St. Gallen U-21	30	15	9	6	54	34	+20	54	
4	Zug 94	30	15	8	7	50	29	+21	53	
5	FC Gossau	30	14	6	10	51	55	−4	48	
6	FC Malcantone Agno	30	12	8	10	41	30	+11	44	
7	SC Buochs	30	14	1	15	37	45	−8	43	
8	FC Tuggen	30	11	8	11	41	43	−2	41	
9	FC Kreuzlingen	30	8	14	8	37	35	+2	38	
10	FC Chiasso	30	8	13	9	27	32	−5	37	
11	FC Rapperswil-Jona	30	9	8	13	41	48	−7	35	
12	FC Freienbach	30	9	8	13	43	57	−14	35	
13	FC Rorschach	30	7	13	10	30	43	−13	34	
14	FC Mendrisio	30	6	12	12	35	43	−8	30	
15	FC Widnau	30	6	7	17	41	67	−26	25	Relegation to 2. Liga Interregional
16	FC Sursee	30	5	1	24	34	77	−43	16	Relegation to 2. Liga Interregional

Source: Erste Liga official website
Rules for classification: 1) Points; 2) Goal difference within the league, or play-off for qualifiers.

== Promotion play-off ==
The three group winners and the runners-up contested this play-off for the two promotion slots. The U-21 teams were not eligible for this stage.

=== Qualification round ===
Team 1	Score	Team 2
Stade Lausanne Ouchy	1–2	Vaduz
Vaduz	3–3	Stade Lausanne Ouchy

Vaduz win 5–4 on aggregate and continue to the finals.

Team 1	Score	Team 2
Schötz	1–0	Concordia
Concordia	3–0	Schötz

Concordia win 3–1 on aggregate and continue to the finals.

Team 1	Score	Team 2
Schaffhausen	3–2	Serrières
Serrières	2–1	Schaffhausen

4–4 on aggregate, Serrières win on away goals and continue to the finals.

=== Final round ===
Team 1	Score	Team 2
Serrières	1–3	Vaduz
Vaduz	0–1	Concordia
Concordia	0–0	Serrières

=== Final table ===
Pos	Team	Pld	W	D	L	GF	GA	GD	Pts	Qualification or relegation
1	FC Concordia Basel	2	1	1	0	1	0	+1	4	Promotion to Challenge League
2	FC Vaduz	2	1	0	1	3	2	+1	3	Promotion to Challenge League
3	FC Serrières	2	0	1	1	1	3	−2	1	

Source: Erste Liga official website
Rules for classification: 1) Points; 2) Goal difference; 3) Goals scored; 4) Head-to-head points; 5) Away goals scored; 6) Play-off.

== Summary ==
Group 1 champions were Serrières, runners-up were Stade Lausanne Ouchy. Group 2 champions were Concordia and runners-up were FC Schaffhausen. Group 3 champions were Vaduz, runners-up were Schötz. These six teams played a qualification and the three winners played a single round-robin to decide the two promotion slots. Concordia and Vaduz secured their promotion to the second tier. Concordia secured the 1. Liga championship.

From group 1 relegated were FC Martigny-Sports and US Terre Sainte. Relegated from group 2 were the two clubs FC Horgen and SV Muttenz and from group 3 the two teams FC Widnau and FC Sursee also suffered relegation. The remaining teams in the division were to be joined in following season by the six winners of the 2. Liga Interregional. These were Sion U-21, FC Baulmes, Basel U-21, Luzern U-21, Zürich U-21 and FC Chur 97.

== See also ==
- 2000–01 Nationalliga A
- 2000–01 Swiss Cup

== Sources ==
- 2000–01 at RSSSF
- Season 2000–01 at the official website

Preceded by 1999–2000	Seasons in Swiss 1. Liga	Succeeded by 2001–02
