= Andrej Poljšak =

Slovenian footballer

Personal information
- Full name: Andrej Poljšak
- Date of birth: 24 June 1968 (age 58)
- Place of birth: Koper, SFR Yugoslavia
- Height: 1.83 m (6 ft 0 in)
- Position: Defender

Youth career
- Koper

Senior career*
Years	Team	Apps	(Gls)
1987–1994	Koper	90+	(0+)
1994–1995	Mura	44	(1)
1996–1997	Gorica	36	(1)
1997–1999	Primorje	54	(0)
1999–2006	Koper	166	(3)
2006–2009	Olimpija	44	(1)

International career
1993–1998	Slovenia	15	(1)
- * Club domestic league appearances and goals

Andrej Poljšak (born 24 June 1968 in Koper) is a Slovenian retired football defender.

== International career ==
Poljšak was capped 15 times and scored 1 goal for the Slovenian national team between 1993 and 1998. His final international was an April 1998 friendly match against the Czech Republic.
