= Manuel Bachmann =

Swiss footballer (born 1975)

Personal information
- Date of birth: 1 April 1975 (age 51)
- Position: Midfielder

Senior career*
Years	Team	Apps	(Gls)
1994–1995	FC Luzern		
- * Club domestic league appearances and goals

Manuel Bachmann (born 1 April 1975) is a Swiss retired football midfielder.
