= Renatus Boniface Njohole =

Tanzanian footballer

Renatus Njohole
Personal information
- Full name: Renatus Boniface Njohole
- Date of birth: June 16, 1980 (age 46)
- Place of birth: Dar es Salaam, Tanzania
- Height: 1.80 m (5 ft 11 in)
- Position: Defensive midfielder

Team information
- Current team: FC Bavois
- Number: 25

Youth career
- Mirambo

Senior career*
Years	Team	Apps	(Gls)
1997	Mirambo	18	(2)
1998–1999	Simba SC	57	(10)
1999–2004	Yverdon Sports	80	(6)
2004	FC Valmont	12	(1)
2005–2007	FC Baulmes	65	(6)
2007–2009	FC Le Mont	22	(0)
2010–	FC Bavois		

International career
2002–2006	Tanzania	4	(0)
- * Club domestic league appearances and goals

Renatus Boniface Njohole (born 16 June 1980, in Dar es Salaam) is a Tanzanian footballer who plays club football for FC Bavois.

== International career ==
He earned 3 international caps for the Tanzania national team between 2002 and 2006.
