= Cassiano (footballer, born 1975) =

Brazilian footballer

Cassiano Mendes
Personal information
- Full name: Cassiano Mendes da Rocha
- Date of birth: 4 December 1975 (age 50)
- Place of birth: Porto Alegre, Brazil
- Height: 1.70 m (5 ft 7 in)
- Position: Midfielder

Senior career*
Years	Team	Apps	(Gls)
1994–1995	Mogi Mirim	6	
1995–1996	Grêmio	3	
1997	Palmeiras	10	
1997–1998	CD Logroñés	20	(2)
1999	São Paulo FC	1	
2000	FC Uralan Elista	24	(1)
2001	FC Aarau	3	(0)
2001–2002	Toros Neza	34	(5)
2002	Nacional	15	(6)
2003	Pohang Steelers	15	(4)
2003–2004	Al Shabab	22	(8)
2004	Botafogo	3	(0)
2004–2005	Penafiel	10	(0)
2005–2006	Deportivo Cuenca	14	(3)
2006	Atlético Junior	16	(3)
2007–2009	Hanoi T&T	34	(6)
2009	Rio Claro	12	(1)
2010	Atlético Sorocaba	11	(1)
- * Club domestic league appearances and goals

Cassiano Mendes da Rocha or simply Cassiano (born 4 December 1975 in Porto Alegre) is a former Brazilian football player. He currently works as a football player's manager in Brazil (CMR Sports Management), leading young athlete's careers. He is qualified as a FIFA Agent and is authorized to work with minors.

== Honours ==
Grêmio

- Brasileirão champion: 1996
- Campeonato Gaúcho champion: 1995, 1996

Nacional

- Uruguayan Primera División champion: 2002
