= Didi (footballer, born 1976) =

Brazilian footballer

Personal information
- Full name: Sebastião Pereira do Nascimento
- Date of birth: 24 February 1976 (age 50)
- Place of birth: Parelhas, Brazil
- Height: 1.79 m (5 ft 10 in)
- Position: Striker

Senior career*
Years	Team	Apps	(Gls)
1997	Sport		
1998	Corinthians Paulista		
1999	Portuguesa		
1999	VfB Stuttgart	2	(0)
2000	FC Aarau		
2001	Juventude		
2002	Busan I'Park	23	(5)
2003	Joinville Esporte Clube		
2003	Ituano Futebol Clube		
2003	Bahia		
2004	Inter		
2004–2005	Chiapas	32	(9)
2005	Tigres	12	(1)
2006–2007	San Luis	46	(5)
2007	Salamanca	17	(8)
2008	Bahia		
2008–2009	Jaibos Tampico Madero		
2010	Paysandu		
2012	Brasil de Farroupilha		
- * Club domestic league appearances and goals

Sebastião Pereira do Nascimento (born 24 February 1976), also known as Didi, is a Brazilian former professional footballer who played as a striker.

In 1999, German club VfB Stuttgart signed him for $2.2 million, because they hoped he could fill the gap caused by Fredi Bobic, who had left Stuttgart for fellow German club Borussia Dortmund, but he was only substituted in twice, and because he always felt bad, he was finally forced to go into a medical control. There, the inability of the player was finally found out: cartilage damage in the knee. Stuttgart finally annulled the contract pretty quickly, and later on, various other clubs seemed to be unaware of his inability and signed him although the cartilage always remained.

He played for several clubs in the domestic leagues and Busan I'Park in South Korean K-League. Above all, he spent the peak of his career at Mexican clubs including Chiapas, Tigres and San Luis.
