= Marinko Jurendic =

Croatian footballer and coach (born 1977)

Marinko Jurendić
Personal information
- Date of birth: 24 November 1977 (age 48)
- Place of birth: SFR Yugoslavia
- Height: 1.80 m (5 ft 11 in)
- Position: Striker

Senior career*
Years	Team	Apps	(Gls)
2000–2002	Thun	56	(18)
2002	Winterthur	7	(1)
2003	Grenchen	14	(13)
2003–2004	Kriens	28	(6)
2004–2005	Luzern	17	(0)
2005–2009	Cham	61	(24)
2010–2012	Ibach		

Managerial career
- 2009–2012: Ibach (player-manager)
- 2009–2017: Switzerland U-16
- 2014–2017: Kriens
- 2017–2018: Aarau
- * Club domestic league appearances and goals

Marinko Jurendić (born 24 November 1977) is a Swiss retired footballer and coach with Bosnian-Croatian roots.

He was named manager of Aarau in June 2017. From 2020 to 2023 he was the sporting director of FC Zürich. In 2023 Jurendic became sporting director of FC Augsburg in the German Bundesliga, when Stefan Reuter resigned as managing director sport, he took up part of Reuters responsibilities, without inheriting his role.
