= Serhiy Skachenko =

Ukrainian and Kazakhstani footballer (born 1972)

Personal information
- Full name: Serhiy Skachenko
- Date of birth: 18 November 1972 (age 53)
- Place of birth: Pavlodar, Pavlodar Province, Kazakh SSR
- Height: 1.85 m (6 ft 1 in)
- Position: Forward

Senior career*
Years	Team	Apps	(Gls)
1989–1990	Traktor Pavlodar	37	(4)
1991	Metalist Kharkiv	9	(2)
1992–1993	Torpedo Moscow	30	(3)
1992–1993	→ Torpedo-d Moscow	8	(3)
1993–1994	Temp Shepetivka	28	(13)
1994–1997	Dynamo Kyiv	26	(5)
1995	→ Dynamo-2 Kyiv	7	(2)
1996–1997	→ Anyang LG Cheetahs (loan)	34	(13)
1997	Jeonnam Dragons	12	(6)
1998–1999	Torpedo Moscow	42	(7)
1999–2003	Metz	32	(4)
2000–2002	→ Metz II	16	(8)
2001	→ Neuchâtel Xamax (loan)	7	(4)
2001	→ Sanfrecce Hiroshima (loan)	11	(2)
2003	→ Aarau (loan)	4	(0)
2003–2004	Karpaty Lviv	2	(0)
2004–2005	Turan Tovuz	20	(4)

International career
1992	CIS U-21	2	(1)
1994–2002	Ukraine	17	(3)
- * Club domestic league appearances and goals

Serhiy Skachenko (born 18 November 1972) is a former Ukrainian football player.

== Career ==
He played for FC Seoul, then known as Anyang LG Cheetahs and Jeonnam Dragons of the South Korean K League.

== Club statistics ==
Club performance			League	
Season	Club	League	Apps	Goals
Soviet Union			League	
1989	Traktor Pavlodar		4	0
1990	Traktor Pavlodar		33	4
1991	Metalist Kharkiv	Top League	9	2
Russia			League	
1992	Torpedo Moscow	Top League	25	3
1993	Torpedo Moscow	Top League	5	0
Ukraine			League	
1993/94	Temp Shepetivka	Premier League	28	13
1994/95	Dynamo Kyiv	Premier League	16	3
1995/96	Dynamo Kyiv	Premier League	10	2
Korea Republic			League	
1996	Anyang LG Cheetahs	K-League	31	11
1997	Anyang LG Cheetahs	K-League	3	2
1997	Chunnam Dragons	K-League	12	6
Russia			League	
1998	Torpedo Moscow	Top Division	29	6
1999	Torpedo Moscow	Top Division	13	1
France			League	
1999/00	Metz	Division 1	16	4
2000/01	Metz	Division 1	8	0
Switzerland			League	
2000/01	Neuchâtel Xamax	Nationalliga A	7	4
Russia			League	
2001	Torpedo Moscow	Top Division	1	0
Japan			League	
2001	Sanfrecce Hiroshima	J1 League	11	2
France			League	
2001/02	Metz	Division 1	3	0
2002/03	Metz	Ligue 2	5	0
Switzerland			League	
2002/03	Aarau	Nationalliga A	4	0
Ukraine			League	
2003/04	Karpaty Lviv	Premier League	2	0
Azerbaijan			League	
2004/05	Turan Tovuz	Top League	20	4
Country	Soviet Union		46	6
Country	Russia		73	10
Country	Ukraine		56	18
Country	Korea Republic		46	19
Country	France		32	4
Country	Switzerland		11	4
Country	Japan		11	2
Country	Azerbaijan		20	4
Total			295	67

== National team statistics ==
Ukraine national team
Year	Apps	Goals
1994	4	0
1995	0	0
1996	0	0
1997	0	0
1998	4	3
1999	7	0
2000	0	0
2001	0	0
2002	2	0
Total	17	3

== International goals ==
Results list Ukraine's goal tally first.

Date	Venue	Opponent	Score	Result	Competition
19 August 1998	Kyiv, Ukraine	Georgia	1 goal	4–0	Friendly match
5 September 1998	Kyiv, Ukraine	Russia	1 goal	3–2	UEFA Euro 2000 qualifying
14 October 1998	Kyiv, Ukraine	Armenia	1 goal	2–0	UEFA Euro 2000 qualifying
