= Cezary Kucharski =

Polish footballer

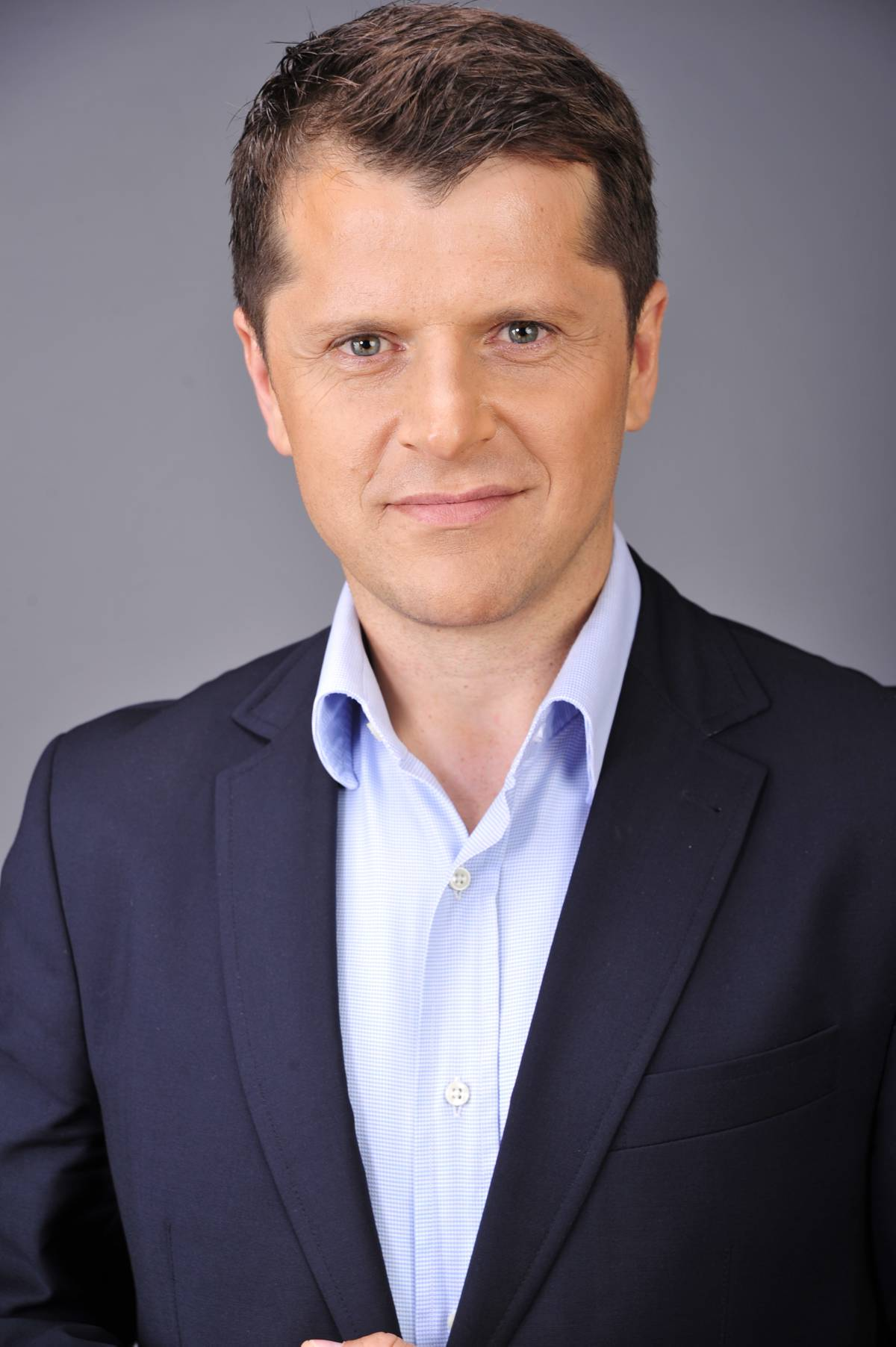

Personal information
- Date of birth: 17 February 1972 (age 54)
- Place of birth: Łuków, Poland
- Height: 1.80 m (5 ft 11 in)
- Position: Striker

Senior career*
Years	Team	Apps	(Gls)
1989–1990	Orlęta Łuków		
1990–1993	Siarka Tarnobrzeg		
1993–1995	Aarau	45	(18)
1995–1997	Legia Warsaw	53	(30)
1997	Sporting Gijón	12	(2)
1997–1999	Legia Warsaw	21	(2)
1999–2000	Stomil Olsztyn	26	(8)
2000–2003	Legia Warsaw	74	(25)
2003–2004	Iraklis	15	(3)
2004–2005	Górnik Łęczna	24	(4)
2005–2006	Legia Warsaw	9	(1)

International career
1996–2002	Poland	17	(3)
- * Club domestic league appearances and goals

Cezary Kucharski (Polish pronunciation: [t͡sɛˈzarɨ kuˈxarskʲi]) (born 17 February 1972) is a Polish politician, football agent and former player who played as a striker.

== Club career ==
Born in Łuków, Kucharski began his playing career in 1989 with his hometown club Orlęta Łuków. In 1990, he moved to Siarka Tarnobrzeg, where he played for more than three seasons, before joining Swiss club FC Aarau in 1994. In 1995, he joined Legia Warsaw, marking the peak of his playing career.

In his first season at Legia Warsaw, the 1995–96 season, he played in the UEFA Champions League and helped the club reach the quarter-finals. During the 1996–97 season, he won the Polish Cup, after which he moved to Spain to join Sporting de Gijón. After returning to Legia Warsaw in 1997, he remained with the club until the 2002–03 season, apart from a one-season spell with Stomil Olsztyn.

During the 2001–02 season, he helped Legia Warsaw win the Ekstraklasa title and the Polish League Cup. In 2003, he moved to Greek club Iraklis Thessaloniki, and the following season he played for Polish club Górnik Łęczna. After returning to Legia for a second spell in 2006, he won another Ekstraklasa title with the club before ending his playing career.

On 2 June 2007, Kucharski played a testimonial match in his hometown of Łuków between his hometown club Orlęta Łuków and Legia, marking his retirement from football.

== International career ==
Kucharski made his debut for the Poland national team in 1996 and made a total of 17 appearances and scored three goals for the national team between 1996 and 2002.

Kucharski was a member of the Poland national team at the 2002 FIFA World Cup. He did not feature in Poland's opening group-stage match against the South Korea or their second match against the Portugal. In the final group-stage match against the United States, he started and played for 64 minutes. Poland won the match 3–1.

== Post-playing career ==
Kucharski finished his career, on 2 June 2007 in his home town of Łuków. After his playing career has started a sports management company called CK Sports Management. He also acts as an agent for several players through Eurosportsmanagement Gmbh. Until February 2018, he managed Robert Lewandowski.

Kucharski served as a Civic Platform member of the Sejm during the 2011-2015 term.

== Career statistics ==
=== International ===
Appearances and goals by national team and year
National team	Year	Apps	Goals
Poland
Poland	1996	2	0
Poland	1997	11	3
Poland	1998	1	0
Poland	2002	3	0
Total		17	3

== Honours ==
Legia Warsaw

- Ekstraklasa: 2001–02, 2005–06
- Polish Cup: 1996–97
- Polish League Cup: 2001–02
