= Franc Cifer =

Slovenian footballer and manager (born 1971)

Personal information
- Date of birth: 16 February 1971 (age 55)
- Height: 1.83 m (6 ft 0 in)
- Position: Defender

Youth career
- Veržej

Senior career*
Years	Team	Apps	(Gls)
1988–2004	Mura	289	(22)
2004–2006	Nafta Lendava	14	(0)
2008	Čarda	2	(0)
Total		305	(22)

International career
1994–1996	Slovenia	7	(0)

Managerial career
- 2012: Mura 05 (interim)
- 2013–2014: Rakičan
- 2014–2016: Mura
- 2016–2018: Beltinci
- 2018–2022: Odranci
- 2024–2025: Dokležovje
- 2026–: Gančani
- * Club domestic league appearances and goals

Franc "Feri" Cifer (born 16 February 1971) is a retired Slovenian footballer who played as a defender.

During his career, Cifer played for Mura and Nafta Lendava, and also represented the Slovenia national team.

== International career ==
Cifer made his debut for Slovenia in a February 1994 friendly match against Tunisia and earned a total of seven caps.

== Managerial career ==
Cifer managed Mura 05 during the 2012–13 UEFA Europa League campaign, where his team reached the play-off round.

Between 2016 and 2018, he was the manager of Beltinci.
