= Martin Fink (footballer) =

Swiss footballer (born 1970)

Personal information
- Date of birth: 21 February 1970 (age 56)
- Place of birth: Emmen, Switzerland
- Position: Forward

Senior career*
Years	Team	Apps	(Gls)
1989–1992	FC Wettingen		
1992–1993	FC Lausanne-Sport		
1993–1994	FC Lugano		
1994–1995	FC Aarau		
1995–1998	FC Luzern		

International career
- Switzerland u-21
- * Club domestic league appearances and goals

Martin Fink (born 21 February 1970) is a retired Swiss football striker.
