= Olivier Baudry (footballer, born 1970) =

French footballer

Personal information
- Date of birth: 13 April 1970 (age 56)
- Place of birth: Orléans
- Position: Defender

Senior career*
Years	Team	Apps	(Gls)
1988–1991	Lens		
1991–1992	Louhans-Cuiseaux		
1992–1993	RSC Charleroi		
1993–1995	Excelsior Mouscron		
1995–1996	FC Mulhouse		
1996–1999	KRC Harelbeke		
1999–2001	FC Aarau		
2001–2003	RAEC Mons		
2003–2006	F91 Dudelange		
2006–2007	Racing FC Union		
2007–2008	SR Delémont		
2008–2009	Jeunesse Esch		
2009–2011	Racing FC Union		
- * Club domestic league appearances and goals

Olivier Baudry (born 13 April 1970) is a retired French football defender.
