= Manfred Oggier =

Swiss footballer (born 1972)

Personal information
- Date of birth: 7 August 1972 (age 54)
- Position: Defender

Senior career*
Years	Team	Apps	(Gls)
1992–1995	FC Sion		
1995–1997	FC Lausanne-Sport		
- * Club domestic league appearances and goals

Manfred Oggier (born 7 August 1972) is a retired Swiss football defender.
