= Genc Mehmeti =

Swiss footballer (born 1980)

Personal information
- Date of birth: 4 November 1980 (age 46)
- Place of birth: Peja, SFR Yugoslavia
- Height: 1.78 m (5 ft 10 in)
- Position: Defensive midfielder

Team information
- Current team: FC Emmenbrücke
- Number: 22

Senior career*
Years	Team	Apps	(Gls)
1999–2000	FC Baden	33	(0)
2000–2001	FC Wil 1900	27	(0)
2001–2002	FC Baden	10	(0)
2002–2007	FC Luzern	103	(5)
2007–2008	FC Schaffhausen	13	(0)
2008–2010	AC Bellinzona	42	(1)
2010–2012	SC Kriens	44	(0)
2012–2013	FC Wangen bei Olten	8	(0)
2013–	FC Emmenbrücke		
- * Club domestic league appearances and goals as of 11 July 2013

Genc Mehmeti (born 4 November 1980) is a Swiss footballer who plays for FC Emmenbrücke.
