= Arjan Peço =

Albanian footballer and coach

Personal information
- Date of birth: 26 April 1975 (age 51)
- Place of birth: Tirana, Albania
- Height: 1.75 m (5 ft 9 in)
- Position: Midfielder

Team information
- Current team: Dornach (first-team coach)

Senior career*
Years	Team	Apps	(Gls)
1992–1995	Dinamo Tirana	95	(12)
1995–1996	Olimpik Tirana	31	(3)
1996–1998	Partizani Tirana	27	(2)
1998–1999	Delémont	39	(1)
1999–2001	Yverdon	77	(4)
2001–2006	Concordia	140	(20)
2006–2008	Laufen	46	(6)
Total		455	(48)

International career
1996–2002	Albania	13	(0)

Managerial career
- 2011–2013: Basel U14
- 2013–2015: Team Basel/Jura U17
- 2015–2017: Basel U18
- 2017–2020: Basel U21
- 2022: Nice (assistant)
- 2023–: Dornach
- * Club domestic league appearances and goals

Arjan Peço (born 26 April 1975) is an Albanian football coach and former player, who is currently first-team coach Dornach.

== Club career ==
During a playing than span 16 years, Peço played for Dinamo and Partizani in Albania, and Delémont, Yverdon, Concordia and Laufen in Switzerland.

== International career ==
Peço made his debut for Albania in an April 1996 friendly match against Bosnia and earned a total of 13 caps, scoring no goals. His final international was a January 2002 Bahrain Tournament match against Bahrain.

== Managerial career ==
Since 2011 he has been working for Basel in the academy. In summer 2017 he was appointed head coach of Basel U-21. He left the post in 2020.

== Honours ==
Partizani

- Albanian Cup: 1996–97
