= Robert Wallon =

Polish footballer

Personal information
- Date of birth: 23 March 1975 (age 51)
- Place of birth: Tarnowskie Góry, Poland
- Height: 1.72 m (5 ft 8 in)
- Position: Midfielder

Senior career*
Years	Team	Apps	(Gls)
1992–1993	Górnik Zabrze	1	(0)
1994	Urania Genève Sport		
1994	Bulle		
1995–1996	Neuchâtel Xamax	2	(0)
1996–1997	Yverdon Sport		
1997–1998	Étoile Carouge	0	(0)
1998–1999	Baden		
2000–2001	Young Boys	32	(5)
2001–2002	Vaduz	18	(3)
2002–2005	Viry-Châtillon		
2010	UKS Biskupice		
- * Club domestic league appearances and goals

Robert Wallon (born Robert Staniszewski on 23 March 1975) is a Poland former professional footballer who played as a midfielder.
