= Gil Bala =

Brazilian footballer (born 1980)

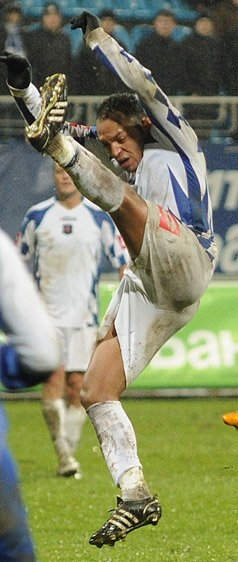

Personal information
- Full name: Josemar Silva dos Santos
- Date of birth: 18 October 1980 (age 46)
- Place of birth: João Pessoa, Brazil
- Height: 1.73 m (5 ft 8 in)
- Position: Striker

Youth career
- 1998: Matsubara
- 1999–2000: Fluminense

Senior career*
| Years | Team | Apps | (Gls) |
| 2000–2004 | Yverdon-Sport | 72 | (21) |
| 2004 | Fluminense | | |
| 2005–2006 | Germinal Beerschot | 18 | (2) |
| 2007 | Matsubara | | |
| 2007 | Stal Alchevsk | 13 | (5) |
| 2007–2010 | Arsenal Kyiv | 48 | (7) |
| 2010 | Yverdon-Sport | 11 | (5) |
| 2011 | Dubai C.S.C. | 7 | (1) |
| 2012 | Mogi Mirim | | |
| 2015–2017 | Campinense | 5 | (0) |
- * Club domestic league appearances and goals

Josemar Silva dos Santos or simply Gil Bala (born 18 October 1980) is a Brazilian former professional footballer who played as a striker.

== Career ==
Gil Bala was born in João Pessoa. He played for Yverdon-Sport in Switzerland, arriving in June 2000. He also played for Fluminense in the 2004 Copa do Brasil. He spent the following season with Germinal Beerschot in the Jupiler League.
