= 2000–01 Swiss Football League =

Swiss football season

Nationalliga A
- Season: 2000–01
- Champions: Grasshopper Club; 26th title
- Relegated: Yverdon Sport
- Top goalscorer: Stéphane Chapuisat (21); Christian Giménez (21)

The 2000–01 season Swiss Football League contains two divisions, the Swiss Super League, at the time called Nationalliga A, and the Swiss Challenge League, at the time called Nationalliga B (in French: Ligue Nationale A/B and Italian: Lega Nazionale A/B). At the end of the season, Nationalliga A held its own championship playoffs, and Nationalliga B held its own relegation playoffs. Additionally, the last 4 teams from A and top 4 teams from B held a relegation/promotion playoff.

== Nationalliga A ==
=== Regular season ===
The Qualification Round to the League season 2000–01 was contested by twelve teams. The first eight teams of the regular season (or Qualification) then competed in the Championship Playoff Round. The teams in the ninth to twelfth positions completed with the top four teams of the Nationalliga B in a Nationalliga A/B Playoff round. The regular season (Grunddurchgang) started on 15 July and ended on 10 December. At the end of the season Grasshopper Club Zürich won the championship.

==== Table ====
Pos	Team	Pld	W	D	L	GF	GA	GD	Pts
1	Lugano	22	12	6	4	33	16	+17	42
2	St. Gallen	22	11	7	4	43	18	+25	40
3	Grasshopper	22	11	3	8	46	25	+21	36
4	Lausanne-Sport	22	11	2	9	37	34	+3	35
5	Basel	22	10	4	8	42	36	+6	34
6	Servette	22	9	6	7	34	26	+8	33
7	Sion	22	9	5	8	27	31	−4	32
8	Zürich	22	8	7	7	36	29	+7	31
9	Aarau	22	6	6	10	31	43	−12	24
10	Yverdon-Sport	22	5	6	11	27	43	−16	21
11	Neuchâtel Xamax	22	6	2	14	21	53	−32	20
12	Luzern	22	5	4	13	27	50	−23	19

Source: RSSSF
Rules for classification: 1) points; 2) goal difference; 3) number of goals scored.

==== Results ====
Home \ Away	AAR	BAS	GCZ	LS	LUG	LUZ	NX	SER	SIO	STG	YS	ZÜR
Aarau		0–1	1–3	1–2	0–2	3–3	2–0	0–3	1–1	1–1	4–3	2–1
Basel	5–2		1–0	2–3	2–3	7–4	5–1	4–2	4–1	2–2	2–1	1–1
Grasshopper	6–0	1–2		3–0	0–3	4–0	6–0	1–1	5–0	1–1	1–0	2–3
Lausanne-Sport	1–3	3–0	0–2		1–0	1–2	2–0	1–1	3–2	0–2	4–2	2–0
Lugano	1–1	1–0	2–0	2–2		3–0	3–0	1–0	0–0	1–0	3–0	1–0
Luzern	0–0	0–2	2–3	2–1	1–1		2–0	0–2	3–1	1–5	2–0	0–2
Neuchâtel Xamax	1–5	2–0	1–3	2–4	1–0	1–1		2–1	1–0	2–1	1–1	3–1
Servette	2–1	1–1	3–1	0–4	2–0	2–0	5–2		0–1	3–1	2–0	1–1
Sion	0–1	1–1	1–0	0–1	3–2	3–0	2–1	1–0		2–1	0–0	3–3
St. Gallen	3–0	4–0	1–0	3–1	1–1	2–1	2–0	0–0	3–1		7–0	2–0
Yverdon-Sport	3–3	1–0	2–3	2–0	1–1	3–1	4–0	2–1	0–1	1–1		1–1
Zürich	1–0	2–0	1–1	3–1	1–2	4–2	3–0	2–2	1–3	0–0	5–0	

Source: RSSSF
Legend: Blue = home team win; Yellow = draw; Red = away team win.

=== Champion playoffs ===
The first eight teams of the regular season (or Qualification) competed in the Championship Playoff Round. They took half of the points (rounded up to complete units) gained in the Qualification as Bonus with them.

==== Table ====
Pos	Team	Pld	W	D	L	GF	GA	GD	BP	Pts	Qualification
1	Grasshopper (C)	14	8	4	2	29	14	+15	18	46	Qualification to Champions League third qualifying round
2	Lugano	14	5	5	4	24	19	+5	21	41	Qualification to Champions League second qualifying round
3	St. Gallen	14	6	2	6	23	28	−5	20	40	Qualification to UEFA Cup qualifying round
4	Basel	14	4	8	2	18	16	+2	17	37	Qualification to Intertoto Cup second round
5	Servette	14	5	5	4	26	19	+7	17	37	Qualification to UEFA Cup first round (Note: As 2000–01 Swiss Cup winner.)
6	Lausanne-Sport	14	4	3	7	15	27	−12	18	33	Qualification to Intertoto Cup first round
7	Sion	14	4	4	6	16	22	−6	16	32	
8	Zürich	14	3	3	8	12	18	−6	16	28	

Source: RSSSF
Rules for classification: 1) points; 2) goal difference; 3) number of goals scored.
(C) Champions

==== Results ====
Home \ Away	BAS	GCZ	LS	LUG	SER	SIO	STG	ZÜR
Basel		3–3	0–0	4–1	1–1	2–1	1–1	2–1
Grasshopper	0–0		4–0	1–1	4–3	3–0	2–1	4–2
Lausanne-Sport	1–1	1–3		0–3	2–1	2–1	2–0	1–1
Lugano	1–1	0–0	4–1		1–1	1–1	4–1	0–1
Servette	3–0	1–0	3–1	2–3		2–2	4–1	2–0
Sion	0–1	2–0	1–0	2–1	1–1		2–1	1–1
St. Gallen	3–2	0–4	4–2	3–2	2–2	4–1		1–0
Zürich	0–0	0–1	1–2	1–2	1–0	3–1	0–1	

Source: RSSSF
Legend: Blue = home team win; Yellow = draw; Red = away team win.

== Nationalliga B ==
=== Regular season ===
==== Table ====
Pos	Team	Pld	W	D	L	GF	GA	GD	Pts
1	Young Boys	22	13	6	3	42	20	+22	45
2	Wil	22	14	3	5	47	28	+19	45
3	Winterthur	22	11	8	3	41	21	+20	41
4	Bellinzona	22	11	5	6	40	27	+13	38
5	Thun	22	10	5	7	46	39	+7	35
6	Delémont	22	9	4	9	43	39	+4	31
7	Kriens	22	7	4	11	29	37	−8	25
8	Locarno	22	6	6	10	28	41	−13	24
9	Wangen b.O.	22	5	7	10	26	38	−12	22
10	Baden	22	5	5	12	23	40	−17	20
11	Étoile Carouge	22	3	9	10	25	36	−11	18
12	Solothurn	22	4	6	12	16	40	−24	18

Source: RSSSF
Rules for classification: 1) points; 2) goal difference; 3) number of goals scored.

==== Results ====
Home \ Away	BAD	BEL	DEL	ÉTO	KRI	LOC	SOL	THU	WAN	WIL	WIN	YB
Baden		1–1	0–0	1–0	2–3	3–2	2–1	0–2	1–2	2–0	1–5	0–0
Bellinzona	4–1		5–3	1–0	1–0	2–0	1–2	3–2	1–1	0–2	2–2	2–2
Delémont	3–0	1–3		3–0	0–2	6–1	2–1	3–2	5–1	4–6	0–1	3–1
Étoile Carouge	0–0	1–2	3–3		1–1	0–0	1–1	1–4	3–1	0–3	1–1	0–3
Kriens	3–1	1–0	1–3	1–3		4–0	2–2	2–5	2–1	0–3	0–2	1–0
Locarno	3–1	1–2	0–0	0–0	1–1		4–1	0–3	2–1	1–2	1–0	1–1
Solothurn	0–3	2–0	1–0	1–7	1–1	0–2		0–0	1–1	0–3	0–0	0–3
Thun	1–1	3–1	2–0	4–1	2–0	3–3	0–1		0–3	3–3	3–3	1–4
Wangen b.O.	1–0	0–5	2–2	2–2	2–1	2–3	2–0	0–1		1–1	1–1	1–1
Wil	1–0	1–3	0–2	1–0	3–2	4–1	4–1	1–0	3–1		2–2	0–2
Winterthur	4–1	1–0	6–0	0–0	3–1	3–2	1–0	1–3	1–0	1–3		3–0
Young Boys	4–2	1–1	1–0	3–1	1–0	2–1	1–0	8–2	2–0	2–1	0–0	

Source: RSSSF
Legend: Blue = home team win; Yellow = draw; Red = away team win.

=== Relegation playoffs ===
Each team was awarded half of the points from the regular season.

==== Table ====
Pos	Team	Pld	W	D	L	GF	GA	GD	Pts
5	Delémont	14	6	5	3	24	20	+4	39
6	Thun	14	5	4	5	24	21	+3	37
7	Kriens	14	5	5	4	12	13	−1	33
8	Baden	14	6	4	4	31	22	+9	32
9	Locarno	14	5	4	5	17	24	−7	31
10	Étoile Carouge	14	3	10	1	16	12	+4	28
11	Wangen b.O. (R)	14	5	1	8	24	32	−8	27
12	Solothurn (R)	14	1	7	6	22	26	−4	19

Source: RSSSF
Rules for classification: 1) points; 2) goal difference; 3) number of goals scored.
(R) Relegated

==== Results ====
Home \ Away	BAD	DEL	ÉTO	KRI	LOC	SOL	THU	WAN
Baden		3–3	1–1	3–0	5–0	2–2	0–1	3–2
Delémont	1–5		0–0	1–1	0–1	2–0	1–2	6–4
Étoile Carouge	2–2	0–0		4–0	1–1	1–1	1–1	2–1
Kriens	1–0	0–0	1–1		2–0	1–0	0–0	2–0
Locarno	3–0	0–2	0–0	1–0		2–2	1–5	3–0
Solothurn	3–4	1–2	1–1	1–1	1–2		2–2	1–2
Thun	2–1	1–2	0–1	1–3	2–2	2–5		1–2
Wangen b.O.	1–2	2–4	3–1	1–0	4–1	2–3	0–4	

Source: RSSSF
Legend: Blue = home team win; Yellow = draw; Red = away team win.

== Nationalliga A/B playoffs ==
The teams in the ninth to twelfth positions in Nationalliga A competed with the top four teams of Nationalliga B in a Nationalliga A/B Playoff round.

=== Table ===
Pos	Team	Pld	W	D	L	GF	GA	GD	Pts
1	Neuchâtel Xamax (P)	14	7	6	1	24	16	+8	27
2	Aarau (P)	14	7	3	4	23	15	+8	24
3	Luzern (P)	14	7	3	4	24	18	+6	24
4	Young Boys (P)	14	7	3	4	17	14	+3	24
5	Yverdon-Sport (R)	14	4	7	3	23	20	+3	19
6	Winterthur (R)	14	5	2	7	18	21	−3	17
7	Wil (R)	14	2	5	7	17	22	−5	11
8	Bellinzona (R)	14	1	3	10	8	28	−20	6

Source: RSSSF
Rules for classification: 1) points; 2) goal difference; 3) number of goals scored.
(P) Promoted; (R) Relegated

=== Results ===
Home \ Away	AAR	BEL	LUZ	NX	WIL	WIN	YB	YS
Aarau		0–2	3–0	1–1	1–0	2–0	2–0	0–0
Bellinzona	1–6		0–1	1–2	0–0	0–0	2–3	1–1
Luzern	3–0	2–0		2–3	4–0	2–3	1–0	4–3
Neuchâtel Xamax	3–2	2–0	2–2		1–0	0–0	1–1	1–1
Wil	2–3	5–0	0–0	2–4		1–3	0–0	1–1
Winterthur	1–2	3–1	1–2	1–2	2–4		2–1	0–1
Young Boys	1–0	1–0	2–0	0–0	1–0	2–0		3–2
Yverdon-Sport	1–1	2–0	1–1	3–2	2–2	1–2	4–2	

Source: RSSSF
Legend: Blue = home team win; Yellow = draw; Red = away team win.

== Attendances ==
#	Club	Average
1	Basel	15,152
2	St. Gallen	10,317
3	GCZ	7,583
4	Sion	7,283
5	Zürich	6,056
6	Lugano	5,325
7	Luzern	4,857
8	Servette	4,583
9	Aarau	3,895
10	Xamax	3,800
11	Lausanne	3,564
12	Yverdon	2,036

== Sources ==
- RSSSF
