= Reto Burri =

Swiss footballer (born 1976)

Personal information
- Date of birth: 3 March 1976 (age 50)
- Position: Forward

Senior career*
Years	Team	Apps	(Gls)
1991–1993	SC Kriens		
1993–1994	FC Luzern		
1994–1995	FC Aarau		
1995–1997	SC Kriens		
1997	FC Sion		
1997	BSC Young Boys		
1998	SC Kriens		
1998	BSC Young Boys		
1999	FC Zürich		
1999–2002	BSC Young Boys		
2002–2006	SC Kriens		
- * Club domestic league appearances and goals

Reto Burri (born 3 March 1976) is a retired Swiss football striker.
