= 1990–91 FC Zürich season =

FC Zürich
1990–91 season
- Owner: Sven Hotz
- Chairman: Sven Hotz
- Head-coach: Herbert Neumann
- Stadium: Letzigrund
- 1990–91 Nationalliga A: 11th of 12
- Promotion/relegation round: Group winners
- 1990–91 Swiss Cup: Semi-final
- Top goalscorer: League: Robert Kok (11); All: Robert Kok (14)

The 1990–91 season was FC Zürich's 94th season in their existence, since their foundation in 1896. It was their first season in the top flight of Swiss football, following their promotion at the end of last season.

== Overview ==
Since the AGM in 1986 the local businessman Sven Hotz was the club's chairman and patron. Herbert Neumann had been appointed as head-coach for the previous season, Walter Iselin was his assistant, and the pair continued in charge of the FCZ first team this season. The FCZ first team competed in this years domestic first-tier 1990–91 Nationalliga A with the clear intention of retaining their top level standing. The team also competed in 1990–91 Swiss Cup. They had not qualified for any of the UEFA European tournaments and they did not enter the Intertoto Cup. FCZ played their home games in the Letzigrund and the stadium is located in the west of Zurich in the district of Altstetten, which is about three kilometers from the city center.

== Players ==
The following is the list of the FCZ first team squad this season. It also includes players that were in the squad the day the domestic league season started, on 25 July 1990, but subsequently left the club after that date.

Note: Flags indicate national team as defined under FIFA eligibility rules; some limited exceptions apply. Players may hold more than one non-FIFA nationality.

No.	Pos.	Nation	Player
—	GK	SUI	Joël Corminbœuf (league games: 14)
—	GK	SUI	Urs Suter (league games: 22)
—	DF	SUI	Vincent Fournier (league games: 33)
—	DF	SUI	Christoph Gilli (league games: 34)
—	DF	SUI	Marcel Hotz (league games: 25)
—	DF	SUI	Ruedi Landolt (league games: 15)
—	DF	SWE	Roger Ljung (league games: 33)
—	DF	SUI	Giuseppe Mazzarelli (league games: 1)
—	DF	SUI	Jürgen Pitsch (league games: 5)
—	DF	SUI	Beat Studer (league games: 34)
—	MF	SUI	Matthias Bärlocher (league games: 19)
—	MF	SUI	Enrico Bizzotto (league games: 13)

No.	Pos.	Nation	Player
—	MF	SUI	Roberto Fregno (league games: 32)
—	MF	SUI	Ralph Heydecker (league games: 4)
—	MF	SUI	Luca Lurati (league games: 1)
—	MF	RSA	Thomas Madigage (league games: 1)
—	MF	RSA	August Makalakalane (league games: 34)
—	MF	SUI	Michael Mazenauer (league games: 24)
—	MF	SUI	Daniele Moro (league games: 15)
—	MF	MAR	Chouaib Saykouk (league games: 11)
—	FW	SUI	Marco Grassi (league games: 7)
—	FW	NED	Robert Kok (league games: 32)
—	FW	TUR	Ercüment Şahin (league games: 6)
—	FW	SUI	David Sesa (league games: 0)
—	FW	COL	John Jairo Tréllez (league games: 26)

Players who left the squad

The following is the list of the FCZ first team players that left the squad during the previous season or in the off-season, before the new domestic season began.

Note: Flags indicate national team as defined under FIFA eligibility rules; some limited exceptions apply. Players may hold more than one non-FIFA nationality.

No.	Pos.	Nation	Player
—	GK	SUI	Stefan Knutti (to Grenchen)
—	DF	SUI	Salvatore Andracchio (retired)
—	DF	SUI	Christian Hedinger (to FC Glarus)
—	DF	YUG	Jochen Kalauz (to SC Zug)
—	DF	NED	Willy Scheepers (to FC Glarus)

No.	Pos.	Nation	Player
—	MF	CZE	Jan Berger (to FC Zug)
—	MF	SUI	René Müller (to FC Herisau as player-coach)
—	MF	SUI	Salvatore Paradiso (to Chiasso)
—	MF	ROU	Marcel Răducanu (retired)
—	FW	SUI	Michel Maiano (to Winterthur)

== Results ==
Legend

Win Draw Loss Postponed

=== Nationalliga A ===
==== Qualification phase ====
25 July 1990 Round 1	Grasshopper Club	1–2	Zürich	Hardturm, Zürich
20:00	Gämperle (yellow card) 32'; Közle 56' (1:2); In-Albon (yellow card) 87'	FCZ summary	27' (0:1) Makalakalane; 48' (0:2) Fregno	Attendance: 18,800; Referee: (Switzerland) Bruno Galler (Kirchdorf, Bern)

28 July 1990 Round 2	Zürich	1–1	Aarau	Letzigrund, Zürich
20:00	Fregno 60' (1:1)	FCZ summary FCA summary	28' (0:1) Wassmer	Attendance: 8,500; Referee: (Switzerland) Gottfried Friedrich (Seedorf, Uri)

4 August 1990 Round 3	Xamax	0–1	Zürich	Stade Charrière, La Chaux-de-Fonds
20:00		FCZ summary	50' (0:1) Makalakalane	Attendance: 8,200; Referee: (Switzerland) Andreas Weber (Bern)
Note: Due to work on the ground, it was not possible to play at the Maladière.

8 August 1990 Round 4	Zürich	1–1	Lugano	Letzigrund, Zürich
20:00	Makalakalane 30' (1:1)	FCZ summary	29' (0:1) Güntensperger; (yellow card) 85' Fornera	Attendance: 8,100; Referee: (Switzerland) Arturo Martino (Neukirch an der Thur)

8 August 1990 Round 5	Lausanne-Sport	4–2	Zürich	Olympique de la Pontaise, Lausanne
20:00	Schürmann 12' (1:0); Aeby 51' (2:1); Schürmann 57' (3:1); Douglas 71' (4:1)	FCZ summary	42' (1:1) Kok; 86' (4:2) Tréllez	Attendance: 10,600; Referee: (Switzerland) Rolf Blattmann (Zeiningen)

18 August 1990 Round 6	Zürich	1–1	Sion	Letzigrund, Zürich
20:00	Tréllez 34' (1:0)	FCZ summary	68' (1:1) Orlando	Attendance: 6,800; Referee: (Switzerland) Kurt Röthlisberger (Suhr, Aargau)

25 August 1990 Round 7	Wettingen	2–2	Zürich	Stadion Altenburg, Wettingen
20:00	Andermatt 27' (1:1); Heldmann (yellow card) 45'; Fasel (yellow card) 61'; Fink 87' (2:2)	FCZ summary	6' (o.g.) (Közle); 54' (1:2) Kok; (yellow card) 73' Bizzotto; (yellow card) 74' B. Studer	Attendance: 5,200; Referee: (Switzerland) Manfred Schlup, (Grenchen)

31 August 1990 Round 8	Zürich	0–3	Young Boys	Letzigrund, Zürich
20:00	Fregno (yellow card); Lurati (yellow card)	FCZ summary	12' (0:1) Zuffi; 55' (0:2) Christensen; 82' (0:3) Löbmann	Attendance: 5,700; Referee: (Switzerland) Werner Müller (Obererlinsbach)

5 September 1990 Round 9	Servette	3–2	Zürich	Charmilles Stadium, Geneva
20:00	Türkyilmaz 14' (1:0); Türkyilmaz 60' (2:1); Hermann 77' (3:2)	FCZ summary	21' (1:1) Makalakalane; 61' (2:2) Kok	Attendance: 4,200; Referee: (Switzerland) Gottfried Friedrich (Seedorf, Uri)

15 September 1990 Round 10	Luzern	5–1	Zürich	Stadion Allmend, Luzern
20:00	Hotz) 11' (o.g.); Knup 31' (2:0); Eriksen 67' (3:0); Moser (yellow card) 81'; Baumann 82' (4:1); Moser 85' (5:1)	(FCZ summary	(yellow card) 58' (yellow-red card) 63' Fregno; 69' (3:1) Madigage	Attendance: 11,600; Referee: (Switzerland) Marcel Despland (Yverdon-les-Bains)

22 September 1990 Round 11	Zürich	1–1	St. Gallen	Letzigrund, Zürich
20:00	Kok (yellow card) 22'; Kok 88' (pen.)	FCZ summary	61' (0:1) Fischer; (yellow card) 71' Sidler; (yellow card) 88' Cardozo; (yellow card) 90' Balmer; (yellow card) 90+1' (yellow-red card) 90+2' Irizik	Attendance: 5,900; Referee: (Switzerland) Manfred Schlup, (Grenchen)

16 October 1990 Round 12	Zürich	1–2	Grasshopper Club	Letzigrund, Zürich
20:00	Tréllez (yellow card) 25'; Gilli (yellow card) 55'; Moro 77' (1:2); Fournier (yellow card) 78'	FCZ summary	(yellow card) 4' Gämperle; 47' (0:1) Strudal; 72' (0:2) Strudal	Attendance: 13,500; Referee: (Switzerland) Arturo Martino (Neukirch an der Thur)

10 October 1990 Round 13	Aarau	2–1	Zürich	Stadion Brügglifeld, Aarau
20:00	Juchli (yellow card) 22'; Mapuata 62' (1:1); Rossi 67' (2:1); Rossi (yellow card) 84'	FCZ summary FCA summary	57' (0:1) Kok; (yellow card) 74' Makalakalane	Attendance: 3,800; Referee: (Switzerland) Freddy Philippoz (Sion)

20 October 1990 Round 14	Zürich	0–1	Xamax	Letzigrund, Zürich
17:30	Gilli (yellow card)	FCZ summary	20' (0:1) Sutter; (red card) 28' Ramzy; (yellow card) Lönn	Attendance: 3,400; Referee: (Switzerland) Francesco Bianchi (Chiasso)

27 October 1990 Round 15	Lugano	3–0	Zürich	Cornaredo, Lugano
20:00	Galvão 21' (1:0); Bloch Jensen 56' (2:0); Bloch Jensen 73' (3:0); Pelosi (yellow card) 86'	FCZ summary	(yellow card) 20' Kok	Attendance: 1,500; Referee: (Switzerland) Paul-Louis Christe (Lausanne)

4 November 1990 Round 16	Zürich	0–0	Lausanne-Sport	Letzigrund, Zürich
14:30	Tréllez (yellow card) 58'	FCZ summary	(yellow card) 75' Ohrel	Attendance: 4,100; Referee: (Switzerland) Daniel Roduit (Sion)

10 November 1990 Round 17	Sion	1–0	Zürich	Stade Tourbillon, Sion
20:00	Geiger 56' (1:0)	FCZ summary	(yellow card) 75' Tréllez	Attendance: 5,900; Referee: (Switzerland) Karl Strässle (Steinach)

18 November 1990 Round 18	Zürich	2–4	Wettingen	Letzigrund, Zürich
14:30	Fournier 13' (1:0); B. Studer (yellow card) 59'; Makalakalane 89' (2:4)	FCZ summary	18' (1:1) Larsen; (yellow card) 32' Brunner; 41' (1:2) Larsen; 51' (1:3) Mathy; 75' (1:4) Fink	Attendance: 2,700; Referee: (Switzerland) Andreas Weber (Bern)

25 November 1990 Round 19	Young Boys	5–1	Zürich	Wankdorf Stadium, Bern
14:30	Jakobsen (yellow card) 8'; Zuffi 18' (pen.); Christensen 20' (2:0); Bohinen 28' (3:0); Zuffi 46' (4:1); Bohinen 51' (5:1); Wittwer (yellow card) 82'	FCZ summary	(yellow card) 24' Hotz; 30' (3:1) Kok	Attendance: 4,600; Referee: (Switzerland) Serge Muhmenthaler (Grenchen)

2 December 1990 Round 20	Zürich	1–2	Servette	Letzigrund, Zürich
14:30	B. Studer 19' (1:0)	FCZ summary	45' (1:1) Sinval; 70' (1:2) Jacobacci	Attendance: 1,500; Referee: (Switzerland) Jean-Claude Craviolini

9 December 1990 Round 21	Zürich	1–0	Luzern	Letzigrund, Zürich
14:30	Tréllez (yellow card) 43'; Makalakalane 70' (1:0); Gilli (yellow card) 85'	FCZ summary	(yellow card) 84' Van Eck	Attendance: 2,300; Referee: (Switzerland) Andreas Weber (Bern)
Note: Christoph Gilli deliberately gets his third yellow card of the season in the 85th minute so that he can serve his suspension in the last match of the qualifying phase.

16 December 1990 Round 22	St. Gallen	3–0	Zürich	Espenmoos, St. Gallen
14:30	Irizik (yellow card) 24'; Mauerhofer 62' (1:0); Hugo Rubio 78' (2:0); Hugo Rubio 89' (3:0)	FCZ summary	(yellow card) 39' Fournier; (yellow card) 88' Landolt	Attendance: 7,000; Referee: (Switzerland) Gottfried Friedrich (Seedorf, Uri)

==== Qualification table ====
Pos	Team	Pld	W	D	L	GF	GA	GD	Pts	Qualification
1	Sion	22	10	10	2	31	20	+11	30	Advance to championship round halved points (rounded up) as bonus
2	Grasshopper Club	22	9	9	4	29	17	+12	27	Advance to championship round halved points (rounded up) as bonus
3	Xamax	22	8	10	4	25	15	+10	26	Advance to championship round halved points (rounded up) as bonus
4	Lausanne-Sport	22	9	8	5	39	30	+9	26	Advance to championship round halved points (rounded up) as bonus
5	Lugano	22	8	9	5	27	22	+5	25	Advance to championship round halved points (rounded up) as bonus
6	Servette	22	9	6	7	30	27	+3	24	Advance to championship round halved points (rounded up) as bonus
7	Young Boys	22	6	11	5	35	26	+9	23	Advance to championship round halved points (rounded up) as bonus
8	Luzern	22	8	7	7	30	28	+2	23	Advance to championship round halved points (rounded up) as bonus
9	St. Gallen	22	7	8	7	26	26	0	22	Continue to promotion/relegation round
10	Aarau	22	3	9	10	19	30	−11	15	Continue to promotion/relegation round
11	Zürich	22	3	6	13	21	45	−24	12	Continue to promotion/relegation round
12	Wettingen	22	3	5	14	24	50	−26	11	Continue to promotion/relegation round

Source: rsssf.com
Rules for classification: 1) Points; 2) Goal difference; 3) Goals scored; 4) Head-to-head points; 5) Away goals scored; 6) Draw.

==== Promotion/relegation phase, group B ====
6 March 1991 Round 1	Schaffhausen	0–0	Zürich	Stadion Breite, Schaffhausen
14:30	Bossi (yellow card) 44'; Engesser (yellow card) 54'; Thoma (red card) 67'	FCZ summary	(yellow card) 31' (yellow-red card) 47' Hotz; (yellow card) 61' Ljung	Attendance: 3,000; Referee: (Switzerland) Arturo Martino (Neukirch an der Thur)

10 March 1991 Round 2	Zürich	3–1	Locarno	Letzigrund, Zürich
14:30	B. Studer 14' (1:1); Saykouk (yellow card) 37'; Bärlocher 74' (2:1); Kok 82' (3:1)	FCZ summary	11' (0:1) Vera; (yellow card) 33' Costas; (yellow card) 87' Omini	Attendance: 3,300; Referee: (Switzerland) Freddy Philippoz (Sion)

16 March 1991 Round 3	Urania Genève Sport	0–2	Zürich	Stade de Frontenex, Geneva
14:30	Domine (yellow card) 53'	FCZ summary	(yellow card) 28' Grassi; 69' (0:1) Grassi; 74' (0:2) Grassi	Attendance: 1,100; Referee: (Switzerland) Kurt Röthlisberger (Suhr, Aargau)

27 March 1991 Round 4	Zürich	0–0	Aarau	Letzigrund, Zürich
20:00	B. Studer (yellow card) 53'; Fregno (yellow card) 86'	FCZ summary FCA summary	(yellow card) 33' Sutter; (yellow card) 44' Koch	Attendance: 4,100; Referee: (Switzerland) Andreas Weber (Bern)

6 April 1991 Round 5	Zürich	4–0	SC Zug	Letzigrund, Zürich
20:00	Grassi 15' (1:0); Grassi 28' (2:0); Fregno 42' (3:0); Mazenauer 73' (4:0)	FCZ summary	(yellow card) 54' Kaltaveridis	Attendance: 2,100; Referee: (Switzerland) Karl Strässle (Steinach)

13 April 1991 Round 6	La Chaux-de-Fonds	0–4	Zürich	Stade Charrière, La Chaux-de-Fonds
17:30	Maranesi (yellow card) 70'	FCZ summary	18' (0:1) Fregno; 58' (0:2) Fregno; 65' (0:3) Fregno; 81' (0:4) Şahin	Attendance: 2,200; Referee: (Switzerland) Bruno Galler (Kirchdorf, Bern)

20 April 1991 Round 7	Old Boys	2–2	Zürich	Stadion Schützenmatte, Basel
20:00	Kägi (yellow card) 6'; Meisel (yellow card) 13'; Kägi 45' (1:0); Lüthi 67' (2:0); Ferrari (yellow card) 72'	FCZ summary	(red card) 6' Makalakalane; 69' (2:1) Kok; 88' (2:2) Saykouk	Attendance: 700; Referee: (Switzerland) Urs Meier (Würenlos)

4 May 1991 Round 8	Zürich	0–0	Old Boys	Letzigrund, Zürich
20:00	Gilli (yellow card) 74'	FCZ summary	(yellow card) 13' Kägi; (yellow card) 30' Lüthi; (yellow card) 39' Paul	Attendance: 1,500; Referee: (Switzerland) Francesco Bianchi (Chiasso)

11 May 1991 Round 9	Zürich	2–1	La Chaux-de-Fonds	Letzigrund, Zürich
20:00	Kok 28' (1:0); Kok 76' (2:1)	FCZ summary	(yellow card) 18' Lovis; 41' (o.g.) (Mazenauer)	Attendance: 1,200; Referee: (Switzerland) Karl Strässle (Steinach)

17 May 1991 Round 10	SC Zug	1–1	Zürich	Allmend Stadion, Zug
20:00	Adams (yellow card) 18'; Winiger (yellow card) 28'; Kaltaveridis (yellow card); Büeler 80' (1:1)	FCZ summary	41' (0:1) Tréllez	Attendance: 800; Referee: (Switzerland) Werner Müller (Obererlinsbach)

25 May 1991 Round 11	Aarau	2–2	Zürich	Stadion Brügglifeld, Aarau
17:30	Sutter 36' (1:2); Komornicki 65' (2:2)	FCZ summary	6' (0:1) Fregno; 9' (0:2) Kok; (yellow card) 36' Gilli; (yellow card) 50' Fournier	Attendance: 4,200; Referee: (Switzerland) Marcel Despland (Yverdon-les-Bains)

1 June 1991 Round 12	Zürich	6–3	Urania Genève Sport	Letzigrund, Zürich
20:00	Tréllez 17' (1:2); Hotz 28' (2:2); Tréllez 44' (3:2); Mazenauer 64' (4:2); Tréllez 85' (5:3); Makalakalane 89' (6:3)	FCZ summary	2' (0:1) Detraz; 13' (0:2) Besnard; (yellow card) 23' Beti; 71' (4:3) Detraz	Attendance: 1,700; Referee: (Switzerland) Urs Meier (Würenlos)

8 June 1991 Round 13	Locarno	0–0	Zürich	Stadio del Lido, Locarno
20:00	Bützer (yellow card) 88' (yellow-red card) 90'	FCZ summary	(yellow card) 60' Makalakalane; (yellow card) 75' Gilli	Attendance: 3,750; Referee: (Switzerland) Karl Strässle (Steinach)

12 June 1991 Round 14	Zürich	2–0	Schaffhausen	Letzigrund, Zürich
20:00	Fregno (yellow card) 11'; Hotz (yellow card) 37'; Tréllez 83' (1:0); Tréllez 90' (2:0)	FCZ summary	(yellow card) 38' Beer	Attendance: 14,700; Referee: (Switzerland) Kurt Röthlisberger (Suhr, Aargau)

==== Final group table ====
Pos	Team	Pld	W	D	L	GF	GA	GD	Pts	Qualification
1	Zürich	14	7	7	0	28	10	+18	21	Remain in NLA 1991–92
2	Aarau	14	7	6	1	28	12	+16	20	Remain in NLA 1991–92
3	FC Schaffhausen	14	8	2	4	19	12	+7	18	Remain in NLB 1991–92
4	Locarno	14	6	5	3	18	13	+5	17	Remain in NLB 1991–92
5	La Chaux-de-Fonds	14	5	2	7	27	26	+1	12	Remain in NLB 1991–92
6	Urania Genève Sport	14	2	7	5	16	27	−11	11	Remain in NLB 1991–92
7	SC Zug	14	2	3	9	14	29	−15	7	Remain in NLB 1991–92
8	BSC Old Boys	14	2	2	10	11	32	−21	6	Remain in NLB 1991–92

Source: rsssf.com
Rules for classification: 1) Points; 2) Goal difference; 3) Goals scored; 4) Head-to-head points; 5) Away goals scored; 6) Draw.

=== Swiss Cup ===
30 September 1990 Round 3	FC Fehraltorf	0–7	Zürich	Hüttenwis, Fehraltorf
		FCZ summary	35' (0:1) Tréllez; 57' (0:2) Tréllez; 58' (0:3) Lurati; 65' (0:4) Ljung; 80' (0:5) Landolt; 87' (0:7) Tréllez; 90' (0:6) Lurati	Attendance: 2,000; Referee: (Switzerland) Walter Nussbaumer (Siebnen)

24 March 1991 Round 4	FC Pratteln	0–1	Zürich	In den Sandgruben, Pratteln
		FCZ summary	63' (0:1) Mazenauer	Attendance: 2,700; Referee: (Switzerland) Urs Meier (Wettingen, Würenlos)

9 April 1991 Round 5	Étoile-Carouge	1–3 (a.e.t.)	Zürich	Stade de la Fontenette, Carouge
	Celso 26' (1:0); Thome (yellow card) 30'; Besnard (yellow card) 96'	FCZ summary	(yellow card) 35' Studer; (yellow card) 41' Grassi; 54' (1:1) Bärlocher; (yellow card) 81' Kok; 95' (pen 1:2) Kok; 115' (1:3) Kok	Attendance: 1,900; Referee: (Switzerland) Fredy Philippoz (Sion)

3 April 1991 Quarter-final	Zürich	4–1 (a.e.t.)	La Chaux-de-Fonds	Letzigrund, Zürich
20:00	Grassi 24' (1:0); Kok 94' (2:1); Tréllez 114' (3:1); Grassi 120' (4:1)	FCZ summary	45' (pen. 1:1) Haatrecht	Attendance: 2,350; Referee: Daniel Roduit Sion, Switzerland

7 May 1991 Semi-final	Young Boys	4–1	Zürich	Wankdorf Stadium, Bern
	Jakobsen 25' (1:0); Bregy 39' (pen. 2:0); Bregy (yellow card) 41'; Bohinen 57' (3:0); Jakobsen 65' (4:0); Wittwer (yellow card) 73'; Hänzi 90' (5:0)	YB summary FCZ summary	(yellow card) 41' Grassi; (yellow card) 43' Fournier; 73' (4:1) Bärlocher	Attendance: 7,000; Referee: (Switzerland) Bruno Galler (Kirchdorf, Bern)

=== Friendly matches ===
==== Pre-season ====
28 June 1990 Exhibition game	Grenchen	0–2	Zürich	Derendingen, Switzerland
		FCZ summary	50' (0:1) Kok; 85' (0:2) Şahin

30 June 1990 Exhibition game	Zürich	1–0	Schaffhausen	Hardhof, Zürich
	Kok 50' (1:0)	FCZ summary		Attendance: 100; Referee: (Switzerland) Gottlieb Barmettler (Luzern)

4 July 1990 Exhibition game	Chiasso	2–0	Zürich	Stadio Comunale, Chiasso
	Goal	FCZ summary

6 JUly 1990 Exhibition game	Bellinzona	0–1	Zürich	Personico
		FCZ summary	30' (0:1) Moro

12 July 1990 Exhibition game	Grenchen	2–2 (4–2 p)	Zürich	Moos, Balsthal
	Przybylo 70' (1:2); Przybylo 72' (2:2)	FCZ summary	35' (0:1) B. Studer; 64' (0:2) Fournier	Attendance: 400; Referee: (Switzerland) Willi Rudin (Liestal)
	Penalties
	Penalty scored		Penalty scored Penalty missed
Note: Sempione-Cup, semi-final.

14 July 1990 Exhibition game	Basel	1–2	Zürich	Moos, Balsthal
17:00	Zbinden 6' (pen. 1:0)	FCZ summary FCB summary	14' (1:1) Tréllez; 49' (1:2) Kok	Attendance: 500; Referee: (Switzerland) Urs Meier (Würenlos)
Note: Sempione-Cup, match for third place.

16 July 1990 Uhrencup	Zürich	0–1	Lugano	Stadion Brühl, Grenchen
		FCZ summary	60' (0:1) Güntensperger	Attendance: 1,200; Referee: (Switzerland) Gottfried Friedrich (Seedorf, Uri)
Note: Uhrencup preliminary round

19 July 1990 Uhrencup	Basel	3–1	Zürich	Stadion Brühl, Grenchen
20:00	Bertelsen 29' (1:0); Gottardi (yellow card) 31'; Maissen 52' (2:0); Zbinden 90' (3:1)	FCZ summary FCB summary	(yellow card) 63' Gilli; 80' (2:1) Kok	Attendance: 1,000; Referee: (Switzerland) Urs Meier (Würenlos)
Note: Uhrencup, match for third place.

==== Winter break and mid-season ====
26 January 1991 Exhibition game	Zürich	6–2	TSV Ofterdingen	Hardhof, Zürich
	3x Grassi	FCZ summary	Goal

30 January 1991 Exhibition game	Lugano	2–2	Zürich	Cornaredo, Lugano
	Gorter 38' (1:1); Bloch Jensen 87' (2:2)	FCZ summary	13' (0:1) Grassi; 42' (1:2) Bizzotto	Attendance: 150

31 January 1991 Exhibition game	FC Mendrisio	1–3	Zürich	Centro Sportivo Comunale, Mendrisio
	Goal	FCZ summary	Tréllez; Makalakalane; Makalakalane	Attendance: 80
Note: First half 45 minutes, second half 35 minutes.

11 February 1991 Exhibition game	Zürich	3–0	ES FC Malley	Mandelieu (France)
	Kok 26' (1:0); Makalakalane 45' (2:0); Tréllez 49' (3:0)	FCZ summary
Note: The training camp took place in the south of France, as Marbella was ruled out due to the Gulf War.

14 February 1991 Exhibition game	Zürich	3–2	Stade Brestois 29	Mandelieu (France)
	Fregno 63' (1:1); Tréllez 75' (2:1); Tréllez 81' (3:2)	FCZ summary	40' (0:1) Ferrer; 80' (2:2) Martins
Note: The training camp took place in the south of France, as Marbella was ruled out due to the Gulf War.

20 February 1991 Exhibition game	Luzern	4–1	Zürich	Schmidguet, Ebikon
	Wolf 21' (1:0); Eriksen 23' (2:1); Nadig 39' (3:1); Knup 69' (4:1)	FCZ summary	23' (1:1) Grassi	Attendance: 300; Referee: (Switzerland) Schuler (Einsiedeln)
Note: The game was abandoned in the 80th minute due to fog.

23 February 1991 Exhibition game	Zürich	2–1	Winterthur	Letzigrund, Zürich
	Kok 32' (1:1); Grassi 53' (2:1)	FCZ summary	28' (0:1) Pisarev	Attendance: 250; Referee: (Switzerland) Schuler (Einsiedeln)

16 April 1991 Mid-season	FC Uznach	0–3	Zürich	Benknerstrasse, Uznach
		FCZ summary	60' (0:1) Sesa; 73' (0:2) Grassi; 84' (0:3) Kok	Attendance: 1,200; Referee: (Switzerland) Karl Strässle (Steinach)

== Sources ==
- dbFCZ Homepage
- Switzerland 1990–91 at RSSSF

Preceded by 1989–90	FC Zürich seasons	Succeeded by 1991–92
