= 1991–92 FC Zürich season =

FC Zürich
1991–92 season
- Owner: Sven Hotz
- Chairman: Sven Hotz
- Head-coach from then: Herbert Neumann until 1 October 1991; Kurt Jara
- Stadium: Letzigrund
- 1991–92 Nationalliga A: 8th of 12
- Championship group: 7th of 8
- 1991–92 Swiss Cup: Round 3
- Top goalscorer: League: Roberto Di Matteo (6); All: Roberto Di Matteo (6)

The 1991–92 season was FC Zürich's 95th season in their existence, since their foundation in 1896. It was their second season in the top flight of Swiss football, following their promotion at the end of 1989–90 season.

== Overview ==
Since the AGM in 1986 the local businessman Sven Hotz was the club's chairman and patron. Herbert Neumann had been head-coach for the previous two seasons and Walter Iselin had been his assistant and the pair continued in charge of the FCZ first team for this season. The FCZ first team competed in this years domestic first-tier 1991–92 Nationalliga A with the clear intention of retaining their top level status. The team also competed in 1991–92 Swiss Cup. They had not qualified for any of the UEFA European tournaments and they did not enter the Intertoto Cup. FCZ played their home games in the Letzigrund and the stadium is located in the west of Zurich in the district of Altstetten, which is about three kilometers from the city center.

Following a bad run, with five league defeats in seven games during August, and the elimination from the Cup in the third round, the club and head-coach Neumann parted ways. Neumann was replaced by Kurt Jara on 1 October. Jara had previously coached St. Gallen for two years and had led Grasshopper Club to the championship title in the 1989–90 season.

== Players ==
The following is the list of the FCZ first team squad this season. It also includes players that were in the squad the day the domestic league season started, on 24 July 1991, but subsequently left the club after that date.

Note: Flags indicate national team as defined under FIFA eligibility rules; some limited exceptions apply. Players may hold more than one non-FIFA nationality.

No.	Pos.	Nation	Player
—	GK	SUI	Roberto Böckli (league games: 25)
—	GK	SUI	Urs Suter (league games: 11)
—	DF	SUI	Peter Beer (league games: 25)
—	DF	SUI	Vincent Fournier (league games: 8)
—	DF	SUI	Alexander Germann (league games: 28)
—	DF	SUI	Christoph Gilli (league games: 27)
—	DF	SUI	Marcel Hotz (league games: 31)
—	DF	SUI	Giuseppe Mazzarelli (league games: 6)
—	DF	SUI	Umberto Romano (league games: 3)
—	DF	ARG	Víctor Sotomayor (league games: 10)
—	DF	SUI	Beat Studer (league games: 10)
—	MF	SUI	Matthias Bärlocher (league games: 25)

No.	Pos.	Nation	Player
—	MF	SUI	Francesco Di Jorio (league games: 1)
—	MF	ITA	Roberto Di Matteo (league games: 34)
—	MF	SUI	Roberto Fregno (league games: 33)
—	MF	SUI	Ralph Heydecker (league games: 18)
—	MF	RSA	August Makalakalane (league games: 24)
—	MF	SUI	Michael Mazenauer (league games: 18)
—	MF	SUI	Daniele Moro (league games: 23)
—	MF	BRA	Luiz Milton (league games: 36)
—	FW	SUI	Marco Grassi (league games: 5)
—	FW	NED	Robert Kok (league games: 14)
—	FW	SUI	David Sesa (league games: 11)
—	FW	YUG	Haris Škoro (league games: 15)
—	FW	COL	John Jairo Tréllez (league games: 10)

Players who left the squad

The following is the list of the FCZ first team players that left the squad during the previous season or in the off-season, before the new domestic season began.

Note: Flags indicate national team as defined under FIFA eligibility rules; some limited exceptions apply. Players may hold more than one non-FIFA nationality.

No.	Pos.	Nation	Player
—	GK	SUI	Joël Corminbœuf (to Xamax)
—	DF	SUI	Ruedi Landolt (to FC Albisrieden player-coach)
—	DF	SWE	Roger Ljung (to Admira Wacker)
—	DF	SUI	Jürgen Pitsch (to FC Brüttisellen)
—	MF	SUI	Enrico Bizzotto (retired)

No.	Pos.	Nation	Player
—	MF	SUI	Luca Lurati (reserves)
—	MF	RSA	Thomas Madigage (to Jomo Cosmos)
—	MF	MAR	Chouaib Saykouk (to FC Brüttisellen)
—	FW	TUR	Ercüment Şahin (to Chiasso)

== Results ==
Legend

Win Draw Loss Postponed

=== Nationalliga A ===
==== Qualification phase ====
24 July 1991 Round 1	Zürich	1–1	Wettingen	Letzigrund, Zürich
20:00	Tréllez 34' (1:0)	FCZ summary	(yellow card) 45' Andermatt; 68' (1:1) Nyfeler; (yellow card) 72' Häusermann; (yellow card) 80' Kundert	Attendance: 5,900; Referee: (Switzerland) Manfred Schlup, (Grenchen)

27 July 1991 Round 2	Young Boys	0–2	Zürich	Wankdorf Stadium, Bern
20:00	Baumann (yellow card) 41'	FCZ summary	9' (0:1) Fregno; 78' (0:2) Tréllez	Attendance: 5,200; Referee: (Switzerland) Werner Müller (Obererlinsbach)

3 August 1991 Round 3	Zürich	0–1	Luzern	Letzigrund, Zürich
20:00		FCZ summary	86' (0:1) Nadig	Attendance: 9,800; Referee: (Switzerland) Werner Müller (Obererlinsbach)

6 August 1991 Round 4	Sion	2–1	Zürich	Stade Tourbillon, Sion
20:00	Calderón 86' (pen. 1:1); Calderón 90' (pen. 2:1)	FCZ summary	(yellow card) 60' Fournier; 71' (0:1) Fregno; (yellow card) 73' Beer; (yellow card) 81' B. Studer; (red card) 89' Di Matteo	Attendance: 8,900; Referee: (Switzerland) Francesco Bianchi (Chiasso)

10 August 1991 Round 5	Zürich	1–1	Lausanne-Sport	Letzigrund, Zürich
20:00	Makalakalane 13' (1:1)	FCZ summary	5' (0:1) Cina; (yellow card) 38' Hottiger	Attendance: 8,700; Referee: (Switzerland) Kurt Röthlisberger (Suhr, Aargau)

17 August 1991 Round 6	Grasshopper Club	3–1	Zürich	Hardturm, Zürich
20:00	Bickel 52' (1:1); Sutter 72' (2:1); Bickel 84' (3:1)	FCZ summary	41' (0:1) Milton	Attendance: 16,100; Referee: (Switzerland) Kurt Röthlisberger (Suhr, Aargau)

24 August 1991 Round 7	Xamax	3–0	Zürich	Stade de la Maladière, Neuchâtel
20:00	Zé Maria 8' (1:0); Zé Maria 52' (2:0); Ramzy 68' (3:0)	FCZ summary		Attendance: 8,800; Referee: (Switzerland) Freddy Philippoz (Sion)

28 August 1991 Round 8	Zürich	1–1	St. Gallen	Letzigrund, Zürich
20:00	Fregno 41' (1:0); Milton (yellow card) 65'	FCZ summary	(yellow card) 32' Wyss; (yellow card) 50' Gambino; 52' (1:1) Zambrano	Attendance: 5,000; Referee: (Switzerland) Serge Muhmenthaler (Grenchen)

31 August 1991 Round 9	Zürich	1–2	Lugano	Letzigrund, Zürich
20:00	Fregno 6' (1:0); Beer (yellow card) 66'	FCZ summary	50' (1:1) Zuffi; 58' (1:2) Hertig; (yellow card) 61' Penzavalli; (yellow card) 75' Locatelli; (yellow card) 80' Fornera	Attendance: 4,400; Referee: (Switzerland) Marcel Despland (Yverdon-les-Bains)

4 September 1991 Round 10	Aarau	1–3	Zürich	Stadion Brügglifeld, Aarau
20:00	Rossi 19' (1:0); Kilian (yellow card) 60'	FCZ summary	49' (1:1) Makalakalane; 55' (1:2) Kok; 83' (1:3) Beer	Attendance: 3,900; Referee: (Switzerland) Arturo Martino (Neukirch an der Thur)

14 September 1991 Round 11	Zürich	1–1	Servette	Letzigrund, Zürich
20:00	Milton 85' (1:0)	FCZ summary	83' (0:1) Molnar	Attendance: 5,300; Referee: (Switzerland) Serge Muhmenthaler (Grenchen)
Note: Servette were managed ad-interim by Bernard Mocellin together with Jackie Barlie.

21 September 1991 Round 12	Wettingen	1–1	Zürich	Stadion Altenburg, Wettingen
20:00	Mathy (yellow card) 17'; Mathy 37' (1:0); Nicora (yellow card) 77'	FCZ summary	(yellow card) 55' Hotz; 58' (1:1) Kok; (yellow card) 68' Gilli	Attendance: 3,200; Referee: (Switzerland) Karl Strässle (Steinach)

5 October 1991 Round 13	Zürich	0–0	Young Boys	Letzigrund, Zürich
20:00	Mazenauer (yellow card) 70' (yellow-red card) 85'	FCZ summary		Attendance: 3,800; Referee: (Switzerland) Manfred Schlup, (Grenchen)

12 October 1991 Round 14	Luzern	0–1	Zürich	Stadion Allmend, Luzern
20:00		FCZ summary	(yellow card) 45' Gilli; (yellow card) 53' Di Matteo; 88' (0:1) Di Matteo	Attendance: 6,500; Referee: (Switzerland) Urs Meier (Würenlos)

15 October 1991 Round 15	Zürich	4–2	Sion	Letzigrund, Zürich
20:00	Kok 13' (1:0); Hotz 24' (2:0); Milton 59' (3:1); Fregno 90' (4:1)	FCZ summary	35' (2:1) Brigger; 90+3' (4:2) Rey	Attendance: 5,100; Referee: (Switzerland) Kurt Röthlisberger (Suhr, Aargau)

19 October 1991 Round 16	Lausanne-Sport	2–0	Zürich	Olympique de la Pontaise, Lausanne
20:00	Cina (yellow card) 39' van den Boogaard 66' (1:0); Gigon 90+1' (2:0)	FCZ summary	(yellow card) 62' Fregno	Attendance: 4,200; Referee: (Switzerland) Gottfried Friedrich (Seedorf, Uri)

26 October 1991 Round 17	Zürich	1–1	Grasshopper Club	Letzigrund, Zürich
17:30	Di Matteo 81' (1:1)	FCZ summary	(yellow card) 21' Wiederkehr; 60' (0:1) Wiederkehr	Attendance: 13,000; Referee: (Switzerland) Bruno Galler (Kirchdorf, Bern)

3 November 1991 Round 18	Zürich	1–1	Xamax	Letzigrund, Zürich
17:30	Moro 44' (1:1); Germann (yellow card) 62'; Hotz (yellow card) 75'; Fregno (yellow card) 82'	FCZ summary	1' (0:1) Sutter	Attendance: 4,200; Referee: (Switzerland) Werner Müller (Obererlinsbach)
Note: Goal by Beat Sutter after just 15 seconds.

19 November 1991 Round 19	St. Gallen	0–0	Zürich	Espenmoos, St. Gallen
20:00	Beer (yellow card) 19'; Gilli (yellow card) 71'; Kok (yellow card) 90'	FCZ summary	(yellow card) 20' Gambino	Attendance: 9,500; Referee: (Switzerland) Kurt Röthlisberger (Suhr, Aargau)

24 November 1991 Round 20	Lugano	2–2	Zürich	Cornaredo, Lugano
14:30	Morf (yellow card) 41'; Hertig 71' (1:2); Zuffi 73' (2:2)	FCZ summary	13' (0:1) Škoro; 51' (0:2) Di Matteo; (yellow card) 54' Moro; (yellow card) 81' Grassi	Attendance: 3,000; Referee: (Switzerland) Daniel Roduit (Sion)

1 December 1991 Round 21	Zürich	0–0	Aarau	Letzigrund, Zürich
14:30		FCZ summary FCA summary	(yellow card) 9' Fluri	Attendance: 3,300; Referee: (Switzerland) Arturo Martino (Neukirch an der Thur)

8 December 1991 Round 22	Servette	0–0	Zürich	Charmilles Stadium, Geneva
14:30	Molnar (yellow card) 19'; Djurovski (yellow card) 27'	FCZ summary	(yellow card) 23' Škoro	Attendance: 5,800; Referee: (Switzerland) Bruno Galler (Kirchdorf, Bern)

==== Qualification table ====
Pos	Team	Pld	W	D	L	GF	GA	GD	Pts	Qualification
1	Lausanne-Sport	22	10	10	2	42	17	+25	30	Advance to championship round halved points (rounded up) as bonus
2	Grasshopper Club	22	12	5	5	39	24	+15	29	Advance to championship round halved points (rounded up) as bonus
3	Sion	22	9	10	3	34	20	+14	28	Advance to championship round halved points (rounded up) as bonus
4	Servette	22	10	7	5	37	28	+9	27	Advance to championship round halved points (rounded up) as bonus
5	Xamax	22	9	6	7	28	22	+6	24	Advance to championship round halved points (rounded up) as bonus
6	St. Gallen	22	8	6	8	27	32	−5	22	Advance to championship round halved points (rounded up) as bonus
7	Young Boys	22	8	5	9	30	30	0	21	Advance to championship round halved points (rounded up) as bonus
8	Zürich	22	4	12	6	22	25	−3	20	Advance to championship round halved points (rounded up) as bonus
9	Luzern	22	5	10	7	21	26	−5	20	Continue to promotion/relegation round
10	Lugano	22	6	8	8	25	36	−11	20	Continue to promotion/relegation round
11	Aarau	22	3	8	11	21	39	−18	14	Continue to promotion/relegation round
12	Wettingen	22	1	7	14	18	45	−27	9	Continue to promotion/relegation round

Source: rsssf.com
Rules for classification: 1) Points; 2) Goal difference; 3) Goals scored; 4) Head-to-head points; 5) Away goals scored; 6) Draw.

==== Championship group ====
The first eight teams of the qualification phase competed in the Championship round. The teams took half of the points (rounded up to complete units) gained in the qualification as bonus with them. The championship group began on 1 March 1992 and was completed on 30 May.

1 March 1991 Round 1	Zürich	2–2	Lausanne-Sport	Letzigrund, Zürich
14:30	Sotomayor (yellow card) 28'; Grassi (yellow card) 31'; Gilli (yellow card) 37'; Di Matteo 55' (pen.); Grassi 80' (2:0)	FCZ summary	(yellow card) 21' J. Studer; (yellow card) 31' Schürmann; (yellow card) 31' Herr; (yellow card) 66' Hottiger; 81' (2:1) van den Boogaard; 87' (2:2) Herr	Attendance: 7,600; Referee: (Switzerland) Kurt Röthlisberger (Suhr, Aargau)

8 March 1992 Round 2	Young Boys	1–2	Zürich	Wankdorf Stadium, Bern
14:30	Weber (yellow card) 40'; Kunz 63' (1:0); Baumann (yellow card) 85'	FCZ summary	(yellow card) 11' Gilli; 71' (1:1) Grassi; 76' (1:2) Grassi	Attendance: 7,200; Referee: (Switzerland) Urs Meier (Würenlos)

15 March 1992 Round 3	Zürich	0–2	Grasshopper Club	Letzigrund, Zürich
14:30	Fregno (yellow card) 8'; Beer (yellow card) 33'	FCZ summary	(yellow card) 24' Häsler; (yellow card) 26' Gämperle; 49' (pen.) Sutter; (yellow card) 69' Nemtsoudis; (yellow card) 73' Cantaluppi; 89' (pen.) Sutter	Attendance: 15,200; Referee: (Switzerland) Manfred Schlup, (Grenchen)

21 March 1992 Round 4	Sion	1–1	Zürich	Stade Tourbillon, Sion
20:00	Lehmann (yellow card) 65'; Rey 77' (1:1); Sauthier (red card) 88'	FCZ summary	(yellow card) 43' Škoro; (yellow card) 64' Hotz; 69' (0:1) Škoro; (red card) 88' Škoro; (yellow card) 90+5' Mazenauer	Attendance: 7,700; Referee: (Switzerland) Karl Strässle (Steinach)

4 April 1992 Round 5	Servette	3–3	Zürich	Charmilles Stadium, Geneva
20:00	Dobrovolsky 11' (1:0); Schepull 30' (2:1); Sinval 74' (3:2); Jacobacci (yellow card) 75'	FCZ summary	25' (1:1) Milton; 40' (2:2) Germann; 77' (pen 3:3) Di Matteo	Attendance: 4,200; Referee: (Switzerland) Arturo Martino (Neukirch an der Thur)
Note: The Charmilles pitch was deep, heavy and had large puddles.

8 April 1992 Round 6	Zürich	1–3	Xamax	Letzigrund, Zürich
20:00	Sotomayor 45' (1:2); Di Matteo (yellow card) 76'	FCZ summary	16' (0:1) Bonvin; 39' (0:2) Bonvin; (yellow card) 62' Egli; 83' (1:3) Cravero	Attendance: 4,100; Referee: (Switzerland) Gottfried Friedrich (Seedorf, Uri)

11 April 1992 Round 7	Zürich	2–1	St. Gallen	Letzigrund, Zürich
20:00	Sesa 59' (1:1); Moro 66' (2:1)	FCZ summary	18' (0:1) Besio; (yellow card) 36' Wyss	Attendance: 3,900; Referee: (Switzerland) Bruno Galler (Kirchdorf, Bern)

24 April 1992 Round 8	St. Gallen	1–1	Zürich	Espenmoos, St. Gallen
17:30	Gambino 20' (1:0); Hengartner (yellow card) 35'; Wyss (yellow card) 65'	FCZ summary	44' (1:1) B. Studer	Attendance: 6,500; Referee: (Switzerland) Urs Meier (Wettingen and Würenlos)

25 April 1992 Round 9	Xamax	3–1	Zürich	Stade de la Maladière, Neuchâtel
20:00	Bonvin 51' (1:1); Chassot (yellow card) 56'; Gottardi (yellow card) 66'; Ramzy 85' (2:1); Chassot 90' (3:1); Smajić (yellow card) 90+1'	FCZ summary	44' (0:1) Škoro; (yellow card) 45' Milton	Attendance: 11,600; Referee: (Switzerland) Karl Strässle (Steinach)

2 May 1992 Round 10	Zürich	2–2	Servette	Letzigrund, Zürich
20:00	Di Matteo 61' (pen. 1:1); Bärlocher (yellow card) 59'; Sotomayor (yellow card) 59'; Sotomayor 67' (2:1)	FCZ summary	51' (pen. 0:1) Dobrovolski; (yellow card) 61' Duchosal; 84' (2:2) Dobrovolski	Attendance: 4,000; Referee: (Switzerland) Gottfried Friedrich (Seedorf, Uri)

9 May 1992 Round 11	Zürich	0–0	Sion	Letzigrund, Zürich
20:00	Sesa (yellow card) 67'	FCZ summary	(yellow card) 87' Brigger	Attendance: 4,600; Referee: (Switzerland) Urs Meier (Wettingen and Würenlos)

16 May 1992 Round 12	Grasshopper Club	3–0	Zürich	Hardturm, Zürich
20:00	Élber 8' (1:0); Bickel 34' (2:0); Grétarsson (yellow card) 36'; Élber 65' (3:0)	FCZ summary	(yellow card) 47' B. Studer; (yellow card) 64' Moro; (red card) 76' Sotomayor	Attendance: 7,100; Referee: (Switzerland) Bruno Galler (Kirchdorf, Bern)
Note: The NZZ dated 18 May 1992, suspected that the increased ticket prices were the reason for the modest turnout of spectators.

23 May 1992 Round 13	Zürich	1–5	Young Boys	Letzigrund, Zürich
20:00	Di Matteo (yellow card) 50'; Germann (yellow card) 59'; Makalakalane 73' (1:4)	FCZ summary	12' (0:1) Baumann; 28' (0:2) Baumann; 37' (0:3) Bohinen; 62' (0:4) Streun; 86' (1:5) Kunz	Attendance: 2,700; Referee: (Switzerland) Daniel Roduit (Sion)

30 May 1992 Round 14	Lausanne-Sport	0–1	Zürich	Olympique de la Pontaise, Lausanne
20:00	Cina (yellow card) 80'	FCZ summary	(yellow card) 73' Mazzarelli; 76' (0:1) Bärlocher	Attendance: 2,500; Referee: (Switzerland) Erwin Fölmli

==== Championship table ====
Pos	Team	Pld	W	D	L	GF	GA	GD	BP	Pts	Qualification
1	Sion	14	7	5	2	23	16	+7	14	33	Swiss champions, qualified for 1992–93 UEFA Champions League
2	Xamax	14	7	5	2	27	16	+11	12	31	Qualified for 1992–93 UEFA Cup
3	Grasshopper Club	14	6	3	5	18	14	+4	15	30	Qualified for 1992–93 UEFA Cup and entered 1992 Intertoto Cup
4	Young Boys	14	7	3	4	24	16	+8	11	28	Entered 1992 Intertoto Cup
5	Servette	14	4	5	5	23	22	+1	14	27	
6	Lausanne Sports	14	2	4	8	11	22	−11	15	23	Entered 1992 Intertoto Cup
7	Zürich	14	3	6	5	17	27	−10	10	22	
8	St. Gallen	14	3	3	8	18	28	−10	11	20	Entered 1992 Intertoto Cup

Source: rsssf.com
Rules for classification: 1) points; 2) Position in the qualification.

=== Swiss Cup ===
27 September 1991 Round 3	Bellinzona	2–1	Zürich	Stadio Comunale Bellinzona, Bellinzona
	Esposito 23' (1:0); Eggeling 62' (2:0); De Lusi (yellow card) 90+1'	FCZ summary	89' (2:1) Milton	Attendance: 1,400; Referee: (Switzerland) Willi Rudin (Liestal)

=== Friendly matches ===
==== Pre-season ====
2 July 1991 Exhibition game	FC Chur	2–0	Zürich	Thusis
	Jildiz 30' (1:0); Casanova 49' (2:0)	FCZ summary		Attendance: 400; Referee: (Liechtenstein) Roland Beck (Triesenberg)

3 July 1991 Exhibition game	Bellinzona	0–1	Zürich	Gudo
		FCZ summary	80' (0:1) Gilli

7 July 1991 Exhibition game	Chiasso	0–1	Zürich	Campo Comunale, Airolo
		FCZ summary	10' (pen.) Makalakalane

11 July 1991 Exhibition game	Basel	1–1 (4–5 p)	Zürich	Moos, Balsthal, Switzerland
19:30	Gottardi (yellow card) 35'; M. Rahmen 63' (1:0)	FCZ summary FCB summary	86' (1:1) Kok	Attendance: 700; Referee: (Switzerland) Dieter Schoch (Attiswil)
	Penalties
	Ceccaroni (penalty scored); Heidenreich (penalty scored); M. Rahmen (penalty scored); Bernhard (penalty missed); Schweizer (penalty scored)		(penalty scored) Tréllez; (penalty scored) Milton; (penalty scored) Mazenauer; (penalty scored) Di Matteo; (penalty scored) Kok
Note: Sempione-Cup, semi-final

13 July 1991 Exhibition game	Zürich	2–1	Aarau	Moos, Balsthal, Switzerland
	Makalakalane 14' (1:0); Di Jorio 69' (2:1)	FCZ summary	62' (1:1) Saibene	Attendance: 1,100; Referee: (Switzerland) René Gemperle (Bremgarten)
Note: Sempione-Cup, final

14 July 1991 Exhibition game	Zürich	2–0	1. FC Köln	Brühl (Muri, Aargau)
	Milton 36' (1:0); Hotz 40' (2:0)	FCZ summary		Attendance: 3,300; Referee: (Switzerland) Gottlieb Barmettler (Luzern)

20 July 1991 Exhibition game	Zürich	1–0	Slavia Prague	Letzigrund, Zürich
	Tréllez 56' (1:0)	FCZ summary		Attendance: 6,000; Referee: (Switzerland) Urs Meier (Wettingen and Würenlos)
Note: Farewell match for Ruedi Landolt: In the 16th minute, the game is interrupted to honor Landolt. Landolt played 451 competition games for FCZ in his 15 year career with the club.

7 November 1991 Mid-season	Zürich	3–5	Milan	Letzigrund, Zürich
	Kok 3' (1:0); Kok 60' (2:3); Makalakalane 69' (3:4)	FCZ summary	21' (1:1) Massaro; 33' (1:2) Massaro; 39' (1:3) Rijkaard; 68' (2:4) Serena; 80' (3:5) Serena	Attendance: 15,000; Referee: (Switzerland) René Kellenberger (Herisau)

==== Winter break ====
26 January 1992 Exhibition game	Lugano	0–0	Zürich	Lugano
		FCZ summary

2 February 1992 Exhibition game	Chiasso	1–2	Zürich	Chiasso
	Şahin (1:2)	FCZ summary	(0:1) Milton (0:2) Bärlocher

6 February 1992 Exhibition game	Minervino	1–6	Zürich	Bari
	Goal	FCZ summary	Škoro; Škoro; Škoro; Sesa; Sesa; Hotz
Note: Match as part of the training camp in Bari.

9 February 1992 Exhibition game	Zürich	1–3	Dynamo Kyiv	Bari
	Goal	FCZ summary	Goal
Note: Match as part of the training camp in Bari.

13 February 1992 Exhibition game	Trani	2–2	Zürich	Bari
	Goal	FCZ summary	Škoro; Sotomayor
Note: Match as part of the training camp in Bari.

19 February 1992 Exhibition game	Winterthur	2–3	Zürich	Winterthur
	Uccella (red card) 45'; Lötscher 55' (1:0); Ramsauer 70' (2:2)	FCZ summary	57' (1:1) Sesa; 62' (1:2) Bärlocher; 79' (2:3) Sotomayor

22 February 1992 Exhibition game	Zürich	3–0	Étoile Carouge	Letzigrund, Zürich
	Škoro 14' (1:0); Grassi 36' (2:0); Di Matteo 78' (pen.)	FCZ summary		Attendance: 150; Referee: (Switzerland) Fritsch

== Sources ==
- dbFCZ Homepage
- Switzerland 1991–92 at RSSSF

Preceded by 1990–91	FC Zürich seasons	Succeeded by 1992–93
