= 1989–90 FC Zürich season =

FC Zürich
1989–90 season
- Owner: Sven Hotz
- Chairman: Sven Hotz
- Head-coach: Walter Iselin ad-interim until end of September from then Hannes Bongartz
- Stadium: Letzigrund
- Nationalliga B: 2nd in group
- Promotion/relegation round: 2nd in group and promoted
- 1989–90 Swiss Cup: Round 4
- Top goalscorer: League: Robert Kok (18); All: Robert Kok (18)

The 1989–90 season was FC Zürich's 93rd season in their existence, since their foundation in 1896. It was their second season in the second flight of Swiss football, following their relegation at the end of the 1987–88 season. FCZ played their home games in the Letzigrund and the stadium is located in the west of Zurich in the district of Altstetten, which is about three kilometers from the city center.

== Overview ==
Since the AGM in 1986 the local businessman Sven Hotz was the club's chairman and patron. Hannes Bongartz had been head-coach the previous season and former player Walter Iselin had been his assistant. Bongartz stood down before the season started. Hotz then appointed the German Herbert Neumann as head-coach. He had been player-coach with Chiasso during the previous three seasons. However, until the end of September when Neumann received his full coaching diploma, he was represented on the side-line by coach ad-interim and assistant Iselin. The FCZ first team competed in this years domestic second-tier Nationalliga B with the clear intention of achieving promotion. The team also competed in 1989–90 Swiss Cup. They had not qualified for any of the UEFA European tournaments and they did not enter the Intertoto Cup.

== Players ==
The following is the list of the FCZ first team squad this season. It also includes players that were in the squad the day the domestic league season started, on 22 July 1989, but subsequently left the club after that date.

Note: Flags indicate national team as defined under FIFA eligibility rules; some limited exceptions apply. Players may hold more than one non-FIFA nationality.

No.	Pos.	Nation	Player
—	GK	SUI	Stefan Knutti (league games: 27)
—	GK	SUI	Urs Suter (league games: 9)
—	DF	SUI	Salvatore Andracchio (league games: 5)
—	DF	SUI	Vincent Fournier (league games: 34)
—	DF	SUI	Christoph Gilli (league games: 34)
—	DF	SUI	Christian Hedinger (league games: 7)
—	DF	YUG	Jochen Kalauz (league games: 19)
—	DF	SUI	Ruedi Landolt (league games: 25)
—	DF	NED	Willy Scheepers (league games: 26)
—	DF	SUI	Beat Studer (league games: 26)
—	MF	CZE	Jan Berger (league games: 12)

No.	Pos.	Nation	Player
—	MF	SUI	Enrico Bizzotto (league games: 2)
—	MF	RSA	August Makalakalane (league games: 14)
—	MF	SUI	Michael Mazenauer (league games: 1)
—	MF	SUI	Daniele Moro (league games: 3)
—	MF	SUI	René Müller (league games: 34)
—	MF	SUI	Salvatore Paradiso (league games: 26)
—	MF	ROU	Marcel Răducanu (league games: 14)
—	FW	SUI	Marco Grassi (league games: 31)
—	FW	NED	Robert Kok (league games: 36)
—	FW	SUI	Michel Maiano (league games: 22)
—	FW	TUR	Ercüment Şahin (league games: 27)
—	FW	COL	John Jairo Tréllez (league games: 13)

Players who left the squad

The following is the list of the FCZ first team players that left the squad during the previous season or in the off-season, before the new domestic season began.

Note: Flags indicate national team as defined under FIFA eligibility rules; some limited exceptions apply. Players may hold more than one non-FIFA nationality.

No.	Pos.	Nation	Player
—	DF	GER	Norbert Eder (retired)
—	DF	SUI	Pierre Thévenaz (to Xamax)
—	DF	SUI	Mario Uccella (to Winterthur)

No.	Pos.	Nation	Player
—	MF	SUI	Stefan Schlumpf (to FC Töss (Winterthur))
—	MF	SUI	Roger Stoop (to FC Brüttisellen)
—	MF	SUI	Jürg Studer (to Aarau)

== Results ==
Legend

Win Draw Loss Postponed

=== Nationalliga B ===
==== Qualification phase group East ====
22 July 1989 Round 1	FC Emmenbrücke	1–2	Zürich	Stadion Gersag, Emmen
	Florian Carrel (yellow card) 47'; Eggeling 90' (pen.)	FCZ summary	(yellow card) 42' Gilli; (yellow card) 60' Grassi; 76' (0:1) Müller; 87' (0:2) Maiano	Attendance: 1,550; Referee: (Switzerland) André Reck (Birsfelden)
Note: Head-coach Herbert Neumann took a place in the stands due to the lack of his diplomas. He was represented on the side-line by assistant coach Walter Iselin until the end of September.

26 July 1989 Round 2	Zürich	3–0	Chiasso	Letzigrund, Zürich
20:00	Răducanu (yellow card) 20'; Şahin 59' (1:0); Müller 75' (2:0); Grassi 85' (3:0)	FCZ summary	(yellow card) 20' Jeannoteguy; (yellow card) 63' Bizzozero	Attendance: 2,600; Referee: (Switzerland) Andreas Weber (Bern)

29 July 1989 Round 3	SC Zug	0–2	Zürich	Herti Allmend Stadion, Zug
	Stierli (yellow card) 38'; Adams (red card) 74'; Allegretti (yellow card) 78'	FCZ summary	(yellow card) 32' Răducanu; (penalty missed) 43′ Müller; 65' (0:1) Şahin; (red card) 74' Berger; 85' (0:2) Şahin	Attendance: 1,050; Referee: (Switzerland) Erwin Schuler (Einsiedeln)
Note: Goalkeeper Markus Hunkeler held the René Müller penalty shot.

5 August 1989 Round 4	Zürich	1–0	FC Schaffhausen	Letzigrund, Zürich
20:00	Răducanu (yellow card) 7'; Răducanu 8' (1:0)	FCZ summary	(yellow card) 26' Di Matteo; (yellow card) 68' Chini; (yellow card) 74' Meier; (yellow card) 85' (yellow-red card) 86' Dreher	Attendance: 4,600; Referee: (Switzerland) Ludwig Zurkirchen

9 August 1989 Round 5	FC Glarus	0–2	Zürich	Buchholz, Glarus
	Aubrun (yellow card) 8'; Hofer (yellow card) 39'; De Giovanni (yellow card) 63'	FCZ summary	4' (0:1) Scheepers; 90' (0:2) Grassi	Attendance: 2,700; Referee: (Switzerland) Marbet (Känerkinden)

15 August 1989 Round 6	Locarno	1–1	Zürich	Stadio del Lido, Locarno
	Pedrotti 24' (1:0)	FCZ summary	74' (1:1) Kok	Attendance: 3,000; Referee: (Switzerland) Marino Paggiola (Appenzell)

23 August 1989 Round 7	Zürich	1–2	Winterthur	Letzigrund, Zürich
20:00	Kok 21' (1:2); Kalauz (yellow card) 90'	FCZ summary	1' (0:1) Güntensperger; 19' (0:2) Hutka; (yellow card) 82' Käser	Attendance: 4,300; Referee: (Switzerland) René Gemperle (Bremgarten)

26 August 1989 Round 8	FC Zug	1–4	Zürich	Allmend Stadion, Zug
	Cossar 65' (1:3)	FCZ summary	38' (0:1) Kok; 53' (0:2) Berger; 63' (0:3) Maiano; 74' (1:4) Maiano	Attendance: 900; Referee: (Switzerland) Pierre-Alain Vuillemin (Geneva)

30 August 1989 Round 9	Zürich	2–0	FC Chur	Letzigrund, Zürich
20:00	Kok 77' (1:0); Fournier 83' (2:0)	FCZ summary	(yellow card) 56' Schmid; (yellow card) 79' Sidler	Attendance: 2,300; Referee: (Switzerland) Willi Rudin (Liestal)

9 September 1989 Round 10	Zürich	4–1	Baden	Letzigrund, Zürich
	Răducanu 48' (1:1); Scheepers 62' (2:1); Paradiso 85' (3:1); Şahin 89' (4:1)	FCZ summary	1' (0:1) Opoku Nti; (yellow card) 41' Nakhid; (yellow card) 44' Müller	Attendance: 2,700; Referee: (Switzerland) Stefan Kohli (Thörishaus)

16 September 1989 Round 11	FC Brüttisellen	0–2	Zürich	Lindenbuck, Wangen-Brüttisellen
	Ruch (yellow card) 18'	FCZ summary	11' (0:1) Scheepers; 14' (0:2) Paradiso	Attendance: 2,650; Referee: (Switzerland) Gottfried Friedrich (Seedorf, Uri)
Note: With 2,650 spectators, a new attendance record.

23 September 1989 Round 12	Zürich	4–2	FC Emmenbrücke	Letzigrund, Zürich
20:00	Müller 3' (1:0); Grassi (yellow card) 17'; Şahin 33' (2:1); Şahin 68' (3:1); Müller 86' (4:2)	FCZ summary	4' (1:1) Eggeling; (yellow card) 49' Wipfli; (yellow card) 51' Kälin; 69' (3:2) Roth; (yellow card) 88' Schupp	Attendance: 1,400; Referee: (Switzerland) Marino Paggiola (Appenzell)

30 September 1989 Round 13	Chiasso	2–1	Zürich	Stadio Comunale, Chiasso
	Minelli (yellow card) 30'; Leva 44' (1:1); Fontana (yellow card) 46' (yellow-red card) 51'; Jeannoteguy 49' (2:1); Sordelli (yellow card) 78'; Jeannoteguy (yellow card) 90'	FCZ summary	31' (0:1) Şahin; (yellow card) 66' (yellow-red card) 88' Gilli	Attendance: 900; Referee: (Switzerland) Robert Grisch (Schaanwald)

8 October 1989 Round 14	Zürich	4–2	SC Zug	Letzigrund, Zürich
	Paradiso 32' (1:1); Kok 36' (2:1); Kok 67' (3:2); Grassi 88' (4:2)	FCZ summary	15' (0:1) Hölzgen; (yellow card) 30' Flückiger; (yellow card) 52' Jakob Bühlmann; 63' (2:2) Hölzgen; (yellow card) 64' Hölzgen	Attendance: 1,100; Referee: (Switzerland) André Reck (Birsfelden)

15 October 1989 Round 15	Schaffhausen	0–0	Zürich	Stadion Breite, Schaffhausen
	Meier (yellow card) 82'	FCZ summary	(yellow card) 38' Paradiso	Attendance: 2,750; Referee: (Switzerland) Francesco Bianchi (Chiasso)

22 October 1989 Round 16	Zürich	1–3	FC Brüttisellen	Letzigrund, Zürich
14:30	Müller (yellow card) 40'; Gilli 65' (1:3); B. Studer (yellow card) 75'; Gilli (yellow card) 85'	FCZ summary	21' (0:1) Malik; 26' (0:2) Wehrli; 58' (0:3) Wehrli; (yellow card) 64' Meier; (yellow card) 81' Pellegrino; (yellow card) 85' Stoop	Attendance: 1,300; Referee: (Switzerland) Paul-Louis Christe (Lausanne)

29 October 1989 Round 17	Zürich	2–0	FC Glarus	Letzigrund, Zürich
	Kok 2' (1:0); Răducanu 27' (2:0)	FCZ summary		Attendance: 1,100; Referee: (Switzerland) Urs Meier (Würenlos)

8 November 1989 Round 18	FC Chur	1–1	Zürich	Ringstrasse, Chur
	Faber (yellow card); Sidler 75' (1:0)	FCZ summary	84' (1:1) Müller	Attendance: 1,500; Referee: (Switzerland) Peter Bochsler (Basel)

12 November 1989 Round 19	Zürich	1–1	Locarno	Letzigrund, Zürich
14:30	Gilli (yellow card) 45'; Şahin 82' (1:1)	FCZ summary	(yellow card) 44' Bützer; 4' (0:1) Fluri; (yellow card) 84' Ferro; (yellow card) 86' Giani; (yellow card) 87' Gianfreda	Attendance: 1,000; Referee: (Switzerland) Ludwig Zurkinden (Zell)

19 November 1989 Round 20	Winterthur	5–3	Zürich	Schützenwiese, Winterthur
	Gurrieri 26' (1:0); Güntensperger 42' (2:0); Hutka 48' (3:0); Gurrieri 87' (4:3); Käser (yellow card) 88'; Isler 90' (5:3)	FCZ summary	(yellow card) 62' Müller; 80' (3:1) Scheepers; 83' (3:2) Scheepers; 84' (3:3) Kok	Attendance: 4,100; Referee: (Switzerland) Charles-Henri Morex (Bex)

26 November 1989 Round 21	Zürich	3–0	FC Zug	Letzigrund, Zürich
	Grassi 12' (1:0); Landolt (yellow card) 81'; Kok 39' (2:0); B. Studer (yellow card) 80'; Kok 83' (3:0); Müller (yellow card) 85'	FCZ summary	(yellow card) 60' Bel Bahi	Attendance: 750; Referee: (Switzerland) François Xavier Amherdt

3 December 1989 Round 22	Baden	2–1	Zürich	Esp Stadium, Fislisbach
	Sitek 69' (1:1); Sitek 89' (2:1)	FCZ summary	27' (0:1) Grassi; (yellow card) 50' Lüdi	Attendance: 1,300; Referee: (Switzerland) Pierre-Alain Eschmann (Moutier)

==== Table group East ====
Pos	Team	Pld	W	D	L	GF	GA	GD	Pts	Qualification
1	Baden	22	14	4	4	46	25	+21	32	Promotion round
2	Zürich	22	13	4	5	45	24	+21	30	Promotion round
3	Winterthur	22	12	5	5	45	30	+15	29	Promotion round
4	FC Schaffhausen	22	8	10	4	36	26	+10	26	Promotion round
5	Locarno	22	7	10	5	36	31	+5	24	Promotion round
6	FC Chur	22	7	9	6	28	26	+2	23	Promotion round
7	Chiasso	22	8	6	8	24	27	−3	22	Relegation round
8	Emmenbrücke	22	6	6	10	38	40	−2	18	Relegation round
9	SC Zug	22	4	10	8	28	39	−11	18	Relegation round
10	FC Glarus	22	3	9	10	27	41	−14	15	Relegation round
11	FC Zug	22	4	6	12	23	52	−29	14	Relegation round
12	FC Brüttisellen	22	5	3	14	33	48	−15	13	Relegation round

Source: RSSSF
Rules for classification: 1) Points; 2) Goal difference; 3) Goals scored; 4) Head-to-head points; 5) Away goals scored; 6) Draw.

==== Promotion/relegation phase, group A ====
25 February 1990 Round 1	Zürich	3–2	Fribourg	Letzigrund, Zürich
14:30	Kok 45' (1:0); Tréllez 66' (2:0); Kok 76' (3:1)	FCZ summary	75' (2:1) Rojević; 81' (3:2) Gross; (yellow card) Troiani	Attendance: 2,300; Referee: (Switzerland) Arturo Martino (Neukirch an der Thur)

4 March 1990 Round 2	Schaffhausen	2–2	Zürich	Stadion Breite, Schaffhausen
14:30	Engesser 9' (1:0); Dreher (yellow card) 22' von Niederhäusern (yellow card) 60'; Harder 90' (2:2)	FCZ summary	36' (1:1) Kok; 44' (1:2) Kok; (yellow card) 68' Răducanu	Attendance: 2,330; Referee: (Switzerland) Karl Strässle (Steinach)

11 March 1990 Round 3	Zürich	1–0	Bellinzona	Letzigrund, Zürich
14:30	Tréllez 79' (1:0)	FCZ summary	(yellow card) 29' Tognini; (yellow card) 42' Mapuata	Attendance: 4,400; Referee: (Switzerland) Jean-Claude Craviolini

18 March 1990 Round 4	FC Chur	1–4	Zürich	Ringstrasse, Chur
14:30	Manetsch 16' (1:0); Brezík (yellow card) 36'	FCZ summary	(yellow card) 9' Gilli; 47' (1:1) Grassi; 60' (1:2) Tréllez; 62' (o.g.) (De Gani); 85' (1:4) Şahin	Attendance: 2,200; Referee: (Switzerland) Francesco Bianchi (Chiasso)

11 April 1990 Round 6	Servette	4–0	Zürich	Charmilles Stadium, Geneva
20:00	Bonvin 16' (1:0); Fargeon 40' (2:0); Favre 63' (3:0); Hermann 86' (4:0)	FCZ summary		Attendance: 6,200; Referee: (Switzerland) Marco Raveglia (San Vittore)

16 April 1990 Round 7	Basel	3–3	Zürich	St. Jakob Stadium, Basel
14:30	Maiano (yellow card) 13' (Dittus) 18' (o.g. 1:0); Scheepers (yellow card) 29'; Tréllez 45+1' (2:0); Makalakalane (yellow card) 57'; Tréllez 72' (3:1)	FCZ summary FCB summary	66' (pen. 2:1) Dittus; 78' (3:2) Wassmer; (yellow card) 87' Moscatelli; 90+1' (3:3) Dittus	Attendance: 22,000; Referee: (Switzerland) Charles-Henri Morex (Bex)

24 April 1990 Round 8	Zürich	3–1	Basel	Letzigrund, Zürich
20:00	Kok 24' (1:0); Müller 25' (2:0); Tréllez 70' (3:0)	FCZ summary FCB summary	(yellow card) 27' Dittus; (yellow card) 60' Reich; (yellow card) 64' Rindlisbacher; 77' (pen. 3:1) Dittus	Attendance: 15,800; Referee: (Switzerland) Arturo Martino (Neukirch an der Thur)
Note: NZZ, April 26, 1990: "For the second time since the start of the game [after 2:0], the Basel fans had behaved badly by throwing bananas and bottles at August Makalakalane, one of the very best and also fairest players on the field."

28 April 1990 Round 9	Zürich	1–2	Servette	Letzigrund, Zürich
20:00	B. Studer (yellow card) 30'; Kok 53' (1:2)	FCZ summary	12' (0:1) Guex; (yellow card) 16' Stiel; 37' (0:2) Türkyilmaz; (yellow card) 81' Hermann; (yellow card) 81' Pédat	Attendance: 10,300; Referee: (Switzerland) Serge Muhmenthaler (Grenchen)

5 May 1990 Round 10	Yverdon-Sports	0–0	Zürich	Stade Municipal, Yverdon
20:00	Schertenleib (yellow card) 53'; Kékesi (yellow card) 58'	FCZ summary	(yellow card) 16' Gilli; (yellow card) 30' Paradiso; (yellow card) 52' B. Studer	Attendance: 2,300; Referee: (Switzerland) Manfred Schlup, (Grenchen)

12 May 1990 Round 11	Zürich	2–1	FC Chur	Letzigrund, Zürich
20:00	Makalakalane 57' (1:0); Grassi 90+1' (2:1)	FCZ summary	81' (1:1) Di Muro	Attendance: 2,500; Referee: (Switzerland) Freddy Philippoz (Sion)

20 May 1990 Round 12	Bellinzona	0–0	Zürich	Stadio Comunale, Bellinzona
20:00	Djurovic (yellow card) 75'; Marchand (yellow card) 77'	FCZ summary		Attendance: 2,000; Referee: (Switzerland) Karl Strässle (Steinach)

26 1990 Round 13	Zürich	4–0	Schaffhausen	Letzigrund, Zürich
20:00	Tréllez 12' (1:0); Tréllez 25' (2:0); Tréllez 70' (3:0); B. Studer 86' (4:0)	FCZ summary	(yellow card) 12' Meier; (yellow card) 60' Harder; (yellow card) 81' Di Matteo	Attendance: 3,100; Referee: (Switzerland) Paul-Louis Christe (Lausanne)

30 May 1990 Round 14	Fribourg	0–4	Zürich	Stade Universitaire Saint-Léonard, Fribourg
20:00	Buntschu (yellow card) 19'; Mulenga (red card) 70'	FCZ summary	23' (0:1) Grassi; 50' (0:2) Grassi; 54' (0:3) Grassi; 75' (0:4) Kok	Attendance: 2,300; Referee: (Switzerland) Arturo Martino (Neukirch an der Thur)
Note: Thanks to this victory, FCZ finished the promotion/relegation round in second place and was promoted to the NLA. NZZ, 31 May 1990: "The supporters of the home club watched the action in amazement, though mostly in silence. The FCZ fans, on the other hand, were all the more exuberant (and at times undisciplined), soon advancing to the touchlines, setting off flares, and staging a spectacle. Eventually, they even commandeered Neumann's substitutes' bench. After the final whistle, the pitch was flooded with supporters."

==== Final group table ====
Pos	Team	Pld	W	D	L	GF	GA	GD	Pts	Qualification
1	Servette	14	8	4	2	29	13	+16	20	Remain in Nationalliga A 1990–91
2	Zürich	14	8	4	2	30	17	+13	20	Promoted to Nationalliga A 1990–91
3	Basel	14	6	5	3	27	17	+10	17	Remain in NLB 1990–91
4	Bellinzona	14	5	5	4	19	16	+3	15	Relegated to NLB 1990–91
5	Yverdon-Sports	14	3	7	4	14	16	−2	13	Remain in NLB 1990–91
6	Fribourg	14	4	3	7	17	27	−10	11	Remain in NLB 1990–91
7	Chur	14	3	3	8	9	21	−12	9	Remain in NLB 1990–91
8	Schaffhausen	14	2	3	9	15	33	−18	7	Remain in NLB 1990–91

Source: RSSSF
Rules for classification: 1) Points; 2) Goal difference; 3) Goals scored; 4) Head-to-head points; 5) Away goals scored; 6) Draw.

=== Swiss Cup ===
20 August 1989 Round 2	FC Altstetten (Zürich)	0–9	Zürich	Buchlern, Altstetten
		FCZ summary	4' (0:1) Maiano; 16' (0:2) Paradiso; 27' (0:3) Paradiso; 31' (0:4) Şahin; 55' (0:5) Şahin; 67' (0:6) Răducanu; 72' (0:7) Maiano; 76' (0:6) Maiano; 85' (0:9) Maiano	Attendance: 1,000; Referee: (Switzerland) Karl Strässle (Steinach)

2 September 1989 Round 3	Zürich	2–0	Chur	Letzigrund, Zürich
	Scheepers (yellow card) 7'; Răducanu 50' (1:0); Răducanu 59' (2:0); Răducanu (yellow card) 71'	FCZ summary	(yellow card) 34' Grazia	Attendance: 947; Referee: (Switzerland) Marco Raveglia (San Vittore)

7 April 1990 Round 4	FC Zürich	3–4	St. Gallen	Hardturm, Zürich
	Stübi (yellow card) 28'; Studer (yellow card) 43'; Müller 59' (1:3); Landolt (yellow card) 71'; Tréllez 76' (2:3); Grassi 82' (3:3)	FCZ summary	13' (0:1) Gambino; 52' (0:2) Hengartner; 57' (0:3) Gämperle; (yellow card) 71' Rubio; 86' (pen. 3:4) Hegi	Attendance: 5,700; Referee: (Switzerland) Kurt Röthlisberger (Suhr)

=== Friendly matches ===
==== Pre-season ====
1 July 1989 Exhibition game	Zürich	1–2	Velež Mostar	Stadion Kleinfeld, Kriens
	Grassi 80' (1:2)	FCZ summary	(0:1) (0:2)	Attendance: 1,500; Referee: (Switzerland) Marco Raveglia (San Vittore)
Note: 6th SRS Cup, Semi-final. The match for 3rd place against Karlsruher SC cancelled due to bad weather conditions.

5 July 1989 Exhibition game	Grenchen	2–0	Zürich	Sportplatz Moos, Balsthal
	Goal	FCZ summary
Note: Sempione-Cup, semi-final.

8 July 1989 Exhibition game	FC Klus-Balsthal	1–5	Zürich	Sportplatz Moos, Balsthal
	75' (1:2)	FCZ summary	32' (0:1) Kok; 48' (0:2) Grassi; 69' (0:3) Kalauz; 86' (1:4) Müller; 90' (1:5) Şahin	Attendance: 350; Referee: (Switzerland) Stefan Kohli (Thörishaus)
Note: Sempione Cup, third place match.

11 July 1989 Exhibition game	Grenchen	5–3	Zürich	Stadion Brühl, Grenchen
	Ciołek 46' (1:2); Du Buisson 51' (2:2); Sahli 53' (3:2); Du Buisson 65' (4:2); Bruder 82' (5:3)	FCZ summary	5' (0:1) Kok; 31' (0:2) Şahin; 66' (4:3) Paradiso	Attendance: 1,000; Referee: (Switzerland) Werner Müller (Obererlinsbach)
Note: Uhrencup, semi-final.

15 July 1989 Exhibition game	Basel	2–0	Zürich	Stadion Brühl, Grenchen
17:00	Moscatelli 26' (1:0); Maissen 44' (2:0); Dittus (yellow card) 53'; Hodel (yellow card) 63'; Berg (yellow card) 77'	FCZ summary FCB summary	(yellow card) 18' Studer; (yellow card) 28' (yellow-red card) 53' Şahin; (yellow card) 90' Scheepers	Attendance: 1,600; Referee: (Switzerland) Walter Rudin Birsfelden
Note: Uhrencup, match for third place

18 July 1989 Exhibition game	BSC Old Boys	0–2	Zürich	Stadion Schützenmatte, Basel
		FCZ summary	4' (0:1) Müller; 13' (0:2) Maiano	Attendance: 350; Referee: (Switzerland) Willi Rudin (Liestal)

==== Winter break ====
21 January 1990 Exhibition game	Zürich	2–1		Letzigrund Trainings pitch, Zürich
	Müller (1:0); Makalakalane (2:0)	FCZ summary	(2:1) Sforza

25 January 1990 Exhibition game	Zürich	0–4	Brøndby IF	Estepona
		FCZ summary	Goal
Note: Match during the training camp in Spain

28 January 1990 Exhibition game	Zürich	0–3	1. FC Kaiserslautern	Estepona
		FCZ summary	Goal
Note: Match during the training camp in Spain

4 February 1990 Exhibition game	FC Einsiedeln	1–4	Zürich	Einsiedeln
	Mijanovic (1:0)	FCZ summary	(1:1) Maiano (1:2) Maiano (1:3) Şahin (1:4) Tréllez

7 February 1990 Exhibition game	Baden	3–2	Zürich	Esp Stadium, Fislisbach
	Sitek 37' (1:1); Sitek 67' (2:1); Sitek 77' (3:1)	FCZ summary	27' (0:1) Kok; 86' (3:2) Tréllez	Attendance: 150; Referee: (Switzerland) René Gemperle (Bremgarten)

15 February 1990 Exhibition game	FC Kilchberg	0–5	Zürich	Kilchberg
		FCZ summary	30' (0:1) Tréllez; 35' (0:2) Şahin; 60' (0:3) Şahin; 80' (0:4) Müller; 85' (0:5) B. Studer

18 February 1990 Exhibition game	Zürich	2–0	Winterthur	Letzigrund training pitch, Zürich
	Maiano 66' (1:0); Tréllez 77' (pen.)	FCZ summary		Attendance: 600; Referee: (Switzerland) Rolf Blattmann (Zeiningen)

== Sources ==
- dbFCZ Homepage
- Switzerland 1989–90 at RSSSF

Preceded by 1988–89	FC Zürich seasons	Succeeded by 1990–91
