= 1990–91 Swiss Cup =

Tournament details
- Country: Switzerland
- Teams: 196

Final positions
- Champions: FC Sion
- Runners-up: BSC Young Boys

Tournament statistics
- Matches played: 195

The 1990–91 Swiss Cup was the 66th season of Switzerland's annual football cup competition. It began on 11 August with the first games of Round 1 and ended on 20 May 1991 with the Final held at former stadium Wankdorf in Bern. The winners earned a place in the first round of the Cup Winners' Cup in the following season.

== Overview ==
The competition began on the week-end 11–12 August 1990 with the first games of Round 1 and ended on Whit Monday 20 May 1991 with the final held at the former Wankdorf Stadium in Bern. The 24 clubs from the Nationalliga B were granted byes for the first round. The 12 clubs from the Nationalliga A were granted byes for the first two rounds. The winners of the cup qualified themselves for the first round of the Cup Winners' Cup in the next season.

The draw was respecting regionalities, when possible, and the lower classed team was granted home advantage. In the entire competition, the matches were played in a single knockout format. In the event of a draw after 90 minutes, the match went into extra time. In the event of a draw at the end of extra time, a penalty shoot-out was to decide which team qualified for the next round. No replays were foreseen, except in the final.

== Round 1 ==
In the first round a total of 160 clubs participated from the third-tier and lower. Reserve teams were not admitted to the competition.

=== Summary ===
Team 1	Score	Team 2
11–12 August 1990
FC Donzelle	1–0	Signal FC (Bernex)
Lancy-Sports	2–4	Stade Nyonnais
Gland	0–3	FC Collex-Bossy
FC Grône	4–5 (a.e.t.)	FC Aigle
FC Brig	1–5	Martigny-Sports
FC Saint-Imier	0–1	Moutier
FC Bassecourt	2–1	FC Le Locle
FC Ueberstorf	0–2	FC Châtel-St-Denis
FC Siviriez	0–2	Vevey Sports
FC Pully	3–1	Concordia/Folgore Lausanne
FC Dompierre	0–12	FC Beauregard Fribourg
FC Marly	2–5	FC Farvagny
FC Allmendingen	0–1	FC Lerchenfeld (Thun)
FC Rapid Ostermundigen	1–4	Thun
FC Langenthal	0–2	Münsingen
Lengnau	2–0	Bümpliz
FC Lamboing	0–2	Biel-Bienne
FC Laupen	1–3	FC Ceneri Bienne
FC Hägglingen	0–2	FC Suhr
FC Windisch	0–6	FC Brugg
Schötz	2–1	FC Hochdorf
FC Sarnen	4–1	FC Brunnen
FC Littau	2–3	FC Zug
FC Hergiswil	2–3	Buochs
SC Emmen	0–1	FC Sursee
Muttenz	7–2	FC Breitenbach
FC Allschwil	0–4 *	FC Pratteln
FC Gelterkinden	1–1 (5–4 p)	Alle
Wangen bei Olten	0–2	FC Klus-Balsthal
FC Welschenrohr	1–4	Solothurn
FC Subingen	1–2	SC Derendingen
FC Effretikon	4–3	Red Star
Schwarz-Weiss Zürich	0–7	Young Fellows
SC Siebnen	0–7	FC Brüttisellen
FC Neunkirch	0–2	FC Fehraltorf
SC Berg	0–5	FC Rorschach
FC Wil	0–1	Frauenfeld
FC Grabs	1–3	Vaduz
US Monte Carasso	0–4	FC Ascona
FC Morbio	1–0	FC Ponte Tresa
FC Apples-Balens	3–2	FC Perly
FC Italia Morges	2–1	FC Versoix
FC Saint-Légier	0–2	FC Fully
FC Grimisuat	2–1	FC Savičse
Bex	1–3	FC Raron
FC Saint-Gingolph	n/p *	Monthey
FC Courtételle	0–3	Laufen
Cortaillod	1–1 (4–2 p)	Delémont
FC Superga	0–1	FC Boudry
FC Bure	1–3 (a.e.t.)	FC Haute-Rive
FC Develier	0–6	Colombier
Düdingen	0–1	FC Domdidier
Baulmes	1–3	Echallens
FC Vallorbe	0–1	FC Grandson
FC Muri (BE)	0–7	FC Bern
Azzurra Gümligen	0–3	SV Lyss
FC Bremgarten	1–5	Wohlen
FC Menziken	0–6	FC Muri (AG)
SC Obergeissenstein	2–1	FC Willisau
SC Baudepartement Basel	0–1	Nordstern Basel
Black Stars	0–0 (a.e.t.) (2–4 p)	FC Riehen
FC Dottikon	1–0	FC Härkinge
FC Beringen	3–1	SC Veltheim (Winterthur)
FC Greifensee	1–2 (a.e.t.)	FC Männedorf
FC Birmensdorf	0–9	Bülach
Blue Stars	1–3	Tuggen
FC Stäfa	2–0	FC Kilchberg
SV Schaffhausen	1–1 (a.e.t.) (5–2 p)	FC Thayngen
FC Spreitenbach	5–2	FC Einsielden
FC Dietikon	2–1	FC Töss (Winterthur)
FC Uzwil	0–4	FC Altstätten (St. Gallen)
FC Winkeln (St.Gallen)	0–1	Brühl
FC Heiden	0–3	Kreuzlingen
St. Otmar	0–4	Herisau
FC Flums	2–0	FC Landquart
FC Mels	1–0	Gossau
FC Vex	1–3	FC Bramois
FC Maggia	5–4 (a.e.t.)	Biaschesi
FC Stabio	0–1	Mendrisio
Racing Club Lausanne	1–14 * FF aws 3–0	FC Renens

- Note to the match Allschwil–Pratteln was played in Pratteln.
- Note to the match Saint-Gingolph–Monthey was not played, no referees, and replayed.
- Note to the match Racing Club–Renens was annulled and awarded as a 3–0 victory for Racing Club. The player Raphaël Baumgartner of Renens was not qualified.

Replay

Team 1	Score	Team 2
16 August 1990
Monthey	2–0	FC Saint-Gingolph

== Round 2 ==
The 24 clubs from the Nationalliga B were granted byes for the first round and joined the competition in the second round. These teams were seeded and cound not be drawn against each other. The draw respected regionalities, when possible, and the lower classed team was granted home advantage.

=== Summary ===
Teams from the Nationalliga B against teams from the 1. Liga:

Team 1	Score	Team 2
18–19 August 1990
Echallens	0–2 (a.e.t.)	Urania Genève Sport
FC Châtel-St-Denis	1–3	Bulle
FC Lerchenfeld (Thun)	1–5	Fribourg
FC Beauregard Fribourg	0–1	SC Burgdorf
FC Klus-Balsthal	0–2	Grenchen
FC Pratteln	4–0	Basel
Young Fellows	0–0 (a.e.t.) (3–5 p)	Winterthur
FC Altstätten (St. Gallen)	0–1	FC Glarus
Tuggen	1–0	Chur
Mendrisio	1–2	Locarno

Teams from NLB against teams from the 2. Liga:

Team 1	Score	Team 2
18–19 August 1990
FC Italia Morges	0–10	Chênois
FC Pully	1–1 (a.e.t.) (3–4 p)	Montreux-Sports
FC Farvagny	2–5	ES Malley
FC Haute-Rive	1–10	Yverdon-Sport
FC Boudry	0–10	La Chaux-de-Fonds
Muttenz	1–3	Old Boys
Schötz	1–2	Kriens
FC Effretikon	1–4	SC Zug
SV Schaffhausen	0–4	Baden
FC Stäfa	1–7	FC Schaffhausen
FC Morbio	0–10	Chiasso

Teams from NLB against teams from the 3. Liga:

Team 1	Score	Team 2
18–19 August 1990
FC Donzelle	0–7	Étoile-Carouge
SC Obergeissenstein	0–3	Bellinzona
FC Sarnen	1–3	Emmenbrücke

Teams from the 1. Liga amongst themselves:

Team 1	Score	Team 2
18–19 August 1990
FC Aigle	1–3	FC Raron
Münsingen	4–1	FC Bern
Nordstern Basel	0–4	FC Sursee
Buochs	1–2	FC Zug
Vaduz	1–3	Kreuzlingen
FC Riehen	1–2	Laufen
Herisau	1–3	FC Rorschach
Monthey	1–0	Martigny-Sports

Teams from the 1. Liga against teams from the 2. Liga:

Team 1	Score	Team 2
18–19 August 1990
FC Bramois	0–5	Vevey-Sports
FC Grimisuat	0–3	FC Fully
Cortaillod	3–1	FC Domdidier
Biel-Bienne	0–2	SV Lyss
FC Dottikon	1–2	FC Suhr
FC Muri (AG)	1–5	Solothurn
FC Gelterkinden	2–3	Moutier
Bülach	3–2	FC Brüttisellen
FC Beringen	3–0	FC Brugg
FC Flums	3–5	Brühl
FC Mels	2–5	Frauenfeld
FC Maggia	3–2	FC Ascona

Teams from the 1. Liga against teams from the 3. Liga:

Team 1	Score	Team 2
18–19 August 1990
FC Grandson	1–4	Colombier
FC Ceneri Bienne	1–2	Thun
FC Racing Club Lausanne	0–10	FC Collex-Bossy

Teams from the 2. Liga amongst themselves:

Team 1	Score	Team 2
18–19 August 1990
FC Bassecourt	3–1	Lengnau
Wohlen	4–0	SC Derendingen
FC Dietikon	0–3	FC Spreitenbach
FC Fehraltorf	4–1	FC Männedorf

Teams from the 2. Liga against teams from the 3. Liga:

Team 1	Score	Team 2
18–19 August 1990
FC Apples-Balens	0–1	Stade Nyonnais

=== Matches ===
18 August 1990
17:30

FC Pratteln	4–0	Basel
Ferreira (yellow card) 41'; Böni (yellow card) 67'; Füri 62' (1:0); Utvic 86' (2:0); Weng 86' (3:0); Steiner 90' (4:0)	Summary	(red card) 49' Bernauer; (yellow card) 83' Reich

In den Sandgruben, Pratteln
Attendance: 1,389
Referee: (Switzerland) Walter Rudin (Birsfelden)

== Round 3 ==
The 12 clubs from the Nationalliga A were granted byes for the first two rounds and they joined the competition in this round. These teams were seeded and cound not be drawn against each other. The draw respected regionalities, when possible, and the lower classed team was granted home advantage.

=== Summary ===
Team 1	Score	Team 2
19 September 1990
FC Pratteln	1–0	Solothurn
28 September 1990
Brühl	1–2	Tuggen
Emmenbrücke	0–2	Luzern
Stade Nyonnais	0–5	Lausanne-Sport
29 September 1990
FC Beringen	3–11	FC Schaffhausen
ES Malley	3–0	Urania Genève Sport
Thun	2–4 (a.e.t.)	Fribourg
FC Maggia	0–3	Chiasso
Moutier	5–0	SV Lyss
Baden	0–2	FC Glarus
Cortaillod	2–1	Colombier
SC Kriens	2–1	AC Bellinzona
La Chaux-de-Fonds	4–1	Bulle
Old Boys	1–2	Wettingen
FC Rorschach	0–2	St. Gallen
Wohlen	0–1	FC Sursee
Yverdon-Sport	1–2	Xamax
Chênois	0–4	Servette
FC Raron	3–2	Monthey
Vevey-Sports	1–4	Montreux-Sports
30 September 1990
FC Fehraltorf	0–7	Zürich
FC Grenchen	1–0	Aarau
Laufen	1–2	FC Suhr
FC Bassecourt	0–7	Young Boys
Bülach	3–0	FC Spreitenbach
FC Collex-Bossy	2–8	Étoile-Carouge
FC Fully	1–3	Sion
Kreuzlingen	1–5	Frauenfeld
Locarno	2–0	Lugano
Münsingen	0–0 (a.e.t.) (2–3 p)	SC Burgdorf
FC Zug	0–3	SC Zug
31 October 1990
Winterthur	1–3	Grasshopper Club

=== Matches ===
29 September 1990

Chênois	0–4	Servette
	Servette summary	15' (0:1) Türkyilmaz; 48' (0:2) Türkyilmaz; 49' (0:3) Türkyilmaz; 53' (0:4) Türkyilmaz

Stade des Trois-Chêne, Thônex

30 September 1990

FC Fehraltorf	0–7	Zürich
	FCZ summary	35' (0:1) Tréllez; 57' (0:2) Tréllez; 58' (0:3) Lurati; 65' (0:4) Ljung; 80' (0:5) Landolt; 87' (0:7) Tréllez; 90' (0:6) Lurati

Hüttenwis, Fehraltorf
Attendance: 2,000
Referee: (Switzerland) Walter Nussbaumer (Siebnen)

30 September 1990

FC Grenchen	1–0	Aarau
Jäggi 70' (pen.)	FCA summary

Stadion Brühl, Grenchen
Attendance: 1,450
Referee: (Switzerland) Gottfried Friedrich (Seedorf, Uri)

30 September 1990

FC Bassecourt	0–7	Young Boys
	YB summary	4' (0:1) Grossenbacher; 8' (0:2) Bregy; 15' (0:3) Gottardi; 16' (0:4) Zuffi; 25' (0:5) Bohinen; 26' (0:6) Bohinen; 28' (0:7) Löbmann

Stade des Grands-Prés, Bassecourt
Attendance: 1,200
Referee: (Switzerland) Rolf Blattmann (Zeiningen)

31 September 1990

Winterthur	1–3	Grasshopper Club
Maiano 44' (1:2)	RSSSF summary	10' (0:1) De Vicente; 40' (pen. 0:2)Sforza; 90+2' (1:3) Strudal

Schützenwiese, Winterthur

== Round 4 ==
=== Summary ===
Team 1	Score	Team 2
23 March 1991
Bülach	0–3	Grasshopper Club
ES Malley	3–0	SC Burgdorf
Frauenfeld	0–1	St. Gallen
Chiasso	2–1 (a.e.t.)	Luzern
Kriens	0–1	Wettingen
Moutier	0–7	Xamax
Étoile-Carouge	5–2	Montreux-Sports
La Chaux-de-Fonds	3–0	Servette
FC Sursee	0–0 (a.e.t.) (6–5 p)	FC Glarus
24 March 1991
Cortaillod	0–4	Lausanne-Sport
Fribourg	0–1	Young Boys
Locarno	1–0	Grenchen
FC Pratteln	0–1	Zürich
FC Schaffhausen	2–0	SC Zug
Tuggen	1–1 (a.e.t.) (3–2 p)	FC Suhr
FC Raron	0–2	Sion

=== Matches ===
23 March 1991

Bülach	0–3	Grasshopper Club
	RSSSF summary	38' (0:1) De Vicente; 68' (0:2) Strudal; 77' (0:3) Strudal

Stadion Erachfeld, Bülach

23 March 1991

La Chaux-de-Fonds	3–0	Servette
37' (0:1) Kincses; 49' (0:2) Urosevic; 50' (pen.) Haatrech	Servette summary

Stade Charrière, La Chaux-de-Fonds

24 March 1991

Fribourg	0–1	Young Boys
Booked	YB summary	66' (0:1) Wittwer; (yellow card) 88' Bregy

Stade Universitaire, Fribourg
Attendance: 2,500
Referee: (Switzerland) Bruno Galler (Kirchdorf, Bern)

24 March 1991

FC Pratteln	0–1	Zürich
	FCZ summary	63' (0:1) Mazenauer

In den Sandgruben, Pratteln
Attendance: 2,700
Referee: (Switzerland) Urs Meier (Wettingen, Würenlos)

== Round 5 ==
=== Summary ===
Team 1	Score	Team 2
9 April 1991
Tuggen	1–0	FC Sursee
Chiasso	2–1 (a.e.t.)	ES Malley
Étoile-Carouge	1–3 (a.e.t.)	Zürich
Grasshopper Club	1–0 (a.e.t.)	Lausanne-Sport
La Chaux-de-Fonds	1–0	Xamax
Locarno	0–1 (a.e.t.)	Sion
Wettingen	1–5	St. Gallen
Young Boys	3–0	FC Schaffhausen

=== Matches ===
9 April 1991

Tuggen	1–0	FC Sursee
Bachmann 50' (1:0)	RSSSF summary

Linthstrasse, Tuggen

9 April 1991

Chiasso	2–1 (a.e.t.)	ES Malley
Bernaschina 7' (1:0); Paradiso 96' (2:1)	RSSSF summary	80' (pen. 1:1) Comisetti

Stadio Comunale Riva IV, Chiasso

9 April 1991

Étoile-Carouge	1–3 (a.e.t.)	Zürich
Celso 26' (1:0); Thome (yellow card) 30'; Besnard (yellow card) 96'	FCZ summary	(yellow card) 35' Studer; (yellow card) 41' Grassi; 54' (1:1) Bärlocher; (yellow card) 81' Kok; 95' (pen 1:2) Kok; 115' (1:3) Kok

Stade de la Fontenette, Carouge
Attendance: 1,900
Referee: (Switzerland) Fredy Philippoz (Sion)

9 April 1991

Grasshopper Club	1–0 (a.e.t.)	Lausanne-Sport
Strudal 111' (1:0)	RSSSF summary

Hardturm, Zürich

9 April 1991

La Chaux-de-Fonds	1–0	Xamax
Urosevic 37' (1:0)	RSSSF summary

Stade Charrière, La Chaux-de-Fonds

9 April 1991

Locarno	0–1 (a.e.t.)	Sion
	RSSSF summary	116' (0:1) Albertoni

Stadio del Lido, Locarno

9 April 1991

Wettingen	1–5	St. Gallen
Rueda 45' (1:1)	RSSSF summary	41' (0:1) Raschle; 52' (1:2) Gambino; 63' (1:3) Cardozo; 76' (1:4) Cardozo; 83' (pen.) Raschle

Stadion Altenburg, Wettingen

9 April 1991

Young Boys	3–0	FC Schaffhausen
32' (1:0) Jakobsen; 38' (2:0) Fimian; 40' (3:0) Hänzi	YB summary

Wankdorf Stadium, Bern
Attendance: 3,980
Referee: (Switzerland) Serge Muhmenthaler (Grenchen)

== Quarter-finals ==
=== Summary ===
Team 1	Score	Team 2
23 April 1991
Tuggen	0–4	Chiasso
Sion	1–0 (a.e.t.)	St. Gallen
Young Boys	2–0	Grasshopper Club
Zürich	4–1 (a.e.t.)	La Chaux-de-Fonds

=== Matches ===
3 April 1991
19:00

Tuggen	0–4	Chiasso
	RSSSF summary	36' (0:1) Bernaschina; 64' (0:2) Dario; (yellow card) 67' Käslin; (yellow card) 75' Minelli; 83' (0:3) Pelosi; 84' (0:4) Milton

Linthstrasse, Tuggen
Attendance: 2,600
Referee: (Switzerland) Arturo Martino (Neukirch an der Thur)

3 April 1991
20:00

Sion	1–0 (a.e.t.)	St. Gallen
Brigger (yellow card) 8'; Brigger 119' (1:0)	RSSSF summary	(yellow card) 98' Irizik; (yellow card) 102' Raschle

Stade Tourbillon, Sion
Attendance: 7,500
Referee: (Switzerland) Gottfried Friedrich (Seedorf, Uri)

3 April 1991
20:00

Young Boys	2–0	Grasshopper Club
Löbmann 35' (1:0); Zuffi 68' (2:0)	YB summary

Wankdorf Stadium, Bern
Attendance: 4,460
Referee: (Switzerland) Karl Strässle (Steinach)

3 April 1991
20:00

Zürich	4–1 (a.e.t.)	La Chaux-de-Fonds
Grassi 24' (1:0); Kok 94' (2:1); Tréllez 114' (3:1); Grassi 120' (4:1)	FCZ summary	45' (pen. 1:1) Haatrecht

Letzigrund, Zürich
Attendance: 2,350
Referee: Daniel Roduit Sion, Switzerland

== Semi-finals ==
=== Summary ===
Team 1	Score	Team 2
7 May 1991
Sion	2–1	Chiasso
Young Boys	5–1	Zürich

=== Matches ===
7 May 1991
20:00

Sion	2–1	Chiasso
A. Rey 13' (1:0); Gertschen 54' (2:0)	RSSSF summary	73' (2:1) Dario

Stade Tourbillon, Sion
Attendance: 8,650
Referee: (Switzerland) Rolf Blattmann (Zeiningen)

7 May 1991

Young Boys	4–1	Zürich
Jakobsen 25' (1:0); Bregy 39' (pen. 2:0); Bregy (yellow card) 41'; Bohinen 57' (3:0); Jakobsen 65' (4:0); (yellow card) 73'; Hänzi 90' (5:0)	YB summary FCZ summary	(yellow card) 41' Grassi; (yellow card) 43' Fournier; 73' (4:1) Bärlocher

Wankdorf Stadium, Bern
Attendance: 7,000
Referee: (Switzerland) Bruno Galler (Kirchdorf, Bern)

== Final ==
=== Summary ===
Team 1	Score	Team 2
20 May 1991
Sion	3–2	Young Boys

=== Telegram ===
20 May 1991
15:00

Sion	3–2	Young Boys
Clausen (yellow card) 35'; Brigger (yellow card) 44'; Orlando 50' (1:2); Orlando 80' (2:2); O. Rey 81' (3:2); Geiger (yellow card) 86'; A. Rey (yellow card) 90+1'	Report	4' (og 0:1) Piffaretti; 47' (0:2) Zuffi; (yellow card) 86' Bregy

Wankdorf, Bern
Attendance: 50,000
Referee: (Switzerland) Kurt Röthlisberger (Suhr)

Sion won the cup and this was the club's sixth cup title to this date.

== Sources and references ==
- RSSSF Page
