= 1988–89 FC Zürich season =

FC Zürich
1988–89 season
- Owner: Sven Hotz
- Chairman: Sven Hotz
- Head-coach: Hannes Bongartz
- Stadium: Letzigrund
- Nationalliga B: 3rd
- Promotion/relegation round: 3rd
- 1988–89 Swiss Cup: Round 3
- Top goalscorer: League: Ercüment Şahin (31); All: Ercüment Şahin (33)

The 1988–89 season was FC Zürich's 92nd season in their existence, since their foundation in 1896. It was their first season in the second flight of Swiss football, following their relegation at the end of last season. FCZ played their home games in the Letzigrund and the stadium is located in the west of Zurich in the district of Altstetten, which is about three kilometers from the city center.

== Overview ==
Since the AGM in 1986 the local businessman Sven Hotz was the club's chairman and patron. As the team suffered relegation the previous season, Hotz did not prolong the contract as head-coach with Friedhelm Konietzka. Many players also left the team. Hotz appointed the German Hannes Bongartz as head-coach. Bongartz had been a free agent, after spending two years coaching 1. FC Kaiserslautern. The FCZ first team competed in this years domestic second-tier Nationalliga B with the clear intention of achieving re-promotion. The team also competed in 1988–89 Swiss Cup. They had not qualified for any of the UEFA European tournaments and they did not enter the Intertoto Cup.

== Players ==
The following is the list of the FCZ first team squad this season. It also includes players that were in the squad the day the domestic league season started, on 23 July 1988, but subsequently left the club after that date.

Note: Flags indicate national team as defined under FIFA eligibility rules; some limited exceptions apply. Players may hold more than one non-FIFA nationality.

No.	Pos.	Nation	Player
—	GK	SUI	Stefan Knutti (league games: 36)
—	GK	SUI	Urs Suter (league games: 1)
—	DF	SUI	Salvatore Andracchio (league games: 26)
—	DF	GER	Norbert Eder (league games: 24)
—	DF	SUI	Vincent Fournier (league games: 35)
—	DF	SUI	Christoph Gilli (league games: 34)
—	DF	SUI	Christian Hedinger (league games: 3)
—	DF	SUI	Ruedi Landolt (league games: 33)
—	DF	SUI	Beat Studer (league games: 19)
—	DF	SUI	Pierre Thévenaz (league games: 11)
—	DF	SUI	Mario Uccella (league games: 12)

No.	Pos.	Nation	Player
—	MF	CZE	Jan Berger (league games: 14)
—	MF	NED	Robert Kok (league games: 14)
—	MF	SUI	Daniele Moro (league games: 13)
—	MF	SUI	René Müller (league games: 36)
—	MF	SUI	Salvatore Paradiso (league games: 30)
—	MF	ROU	Marcel Răducanu (league games: 33)
—	MF	SUI	Stefan Schlumpf (league games: 5)
—	MF	SUI	Roger Stoop (league games: 1)
—	MF	SUI	Jürg Studer (league games: 18)
—	FW	SUI	Michel Maiano (league games: 27)
—	FW	TUR	Ercüment Şahin (league games: 34)

Players who left the squad

The following is the list of the FCZ first team players that left the squad during the previous season or in the off-season, before the new domestic season began.

Note: Flags indicate national team as defined under FIFA eligibility rules; some limited exceptions apply. Players may hold more than one non-FIFA nationality.

No.	Pos.	Nation	Player
—	GK	SUI	Patrick Tornare (retired)
—	DF	SUI	Renato Hächler (retired)
—	DF	SUI	Heinz Lüdi (to Xamax)
—	DF	SUI	Daniel Perisset (to SC Zug)
—	DF	NZL	Shane Rufer (to Bellinzona)
—	DF	SUI	Peter Stoll (to Schaffhausen)
—	MF	SUI	Thomas Bickel (to Grasshopper Club)
—	MF	SUI	Marcel Gamper (reserves)
—	MF	SUI	Urs Jakob Huber (reserves)
—	MF	SUI	Roger Kundert (to Wettingen)

No.	Pos.	Nation	Player
—	MF	ITA	Marco Mautone (to Grenchen)
—	MF	SUI	Michael Mazenauer (reserves)
—	MF	SUI	Norbert Sonderegger (resereves)
—	MF	SUI	Marcel Stoob (to FC Chur)
—	MF	SWE	Jonas Thern (to Malmö FF)
—	MF	SUI	Dragan Vojnovic (reserves)
—	FW	SUI	Massimo Alliata (retired)
—	FW	ENG	John Linford (to FC Utrecht)
—	FW	ITA	Salvatore Romano to Wettingen
—	FW	GER	Wolfgang Vöge (retired)

== Results ==
Legend

Win Draw Loss Postponed

=== Nationalliga B ===
==== Qualification phase group East ====
23 July 1988 Round 1	Zürich	1–1	Basel	Letzigrund, Zürich
20:00	Landolt 6' (1:1); Landolt (yellow card) 27'	FCZ summary FCB summary	3' (0:1) Esposito; (yellow card) 24' Baumann; (yellow card) 63' Moscatelli	Attendance: 5,300; Referee: (Switzerland) Francesco Bianchi
Note: Goalie Urs Suter left the field in the 45th minute with a torn Achilles tendon.

27 July 1988 Round 2	Baden	3–2	Zürich	Esp Stadium, Fislisbach
20:00	Schneider 19' (1:0); Wiesner 48' (pen.); Humbel 80' (3:2); Haller (yellow card) 87'	FCZ summary	(yellow card) 46' Landolt; 65' (2:1) Landolt; 77' (2:2) Maiano	Attendance: 2,200; Referee: (Switzerland) Peter Bochsler (Basel)

30 July 1988 Round 3	Zürich	5–1	FC Emmenbrücke	Letzigrund, Zürich
20:00	J. Studer 17' (1:0); Şahin 44' (2:0); Şahin 45' (3:0); Şahin 63' (4:0); Müller 67' (pen.); Gilli (yellow card)	FCZ summary	75' (5:1) Roth; (yellow card) Hölzgen; (yellow card) Greber	Attendance: 2,100; Referee: (Switzerland) Willy Hänni, (Cugy)

6 August 1988 Round 4	Chiasso	3–2	Zürich	Stadio Comunale, Chiasso
20:00	Bordoli 4' (1:0); Airaghi (yellow card) 41'; Di Muro 81' (pen.); Di Muro 83' (3:2)	FCZ summary	51' (1:1) Maiano; (yellow card) 57' J. Studer; 75' (1:2) Landolt	Attendance: 1,300; Referee: (Switzerland) Jean-Claude Craviolini

10 August 1988 Round 5	Zürich	4–0	Winterthur	Letzigrund, Zürich
20:00	J. Studer 33' (1:0); Şahin 55' (2:0); Maiano 65' (3:0); Müller 68' (pen.)	FCZ summary	(yellow card) 25' Güntensperger; (yellow card) 51' Isler	Attendance: 4,600; Referee: (Switzerland) Serge Muhmenthaler (Grenchen)

12 August 1988 Round 6	SC Zug	1–5	Zürich	Herti Allmend Stadion, Zug
19:30	Schwarz (yellow card) 57'; Ferrari 64' (1:1); Sidler (yellow card) 71'	FCZ summary	(yellow card) 31' Paradiso; 37' (0:1) Paradiso; 74' (1:2) Maiano; 77' (1:3) Şahin; (yellow card) 75' Gilli; 88' (1:4) Maiano; 89' (1:5) Paradiso	Attendance: 1,200; Referee: (Switzerland) Flavio Scalena (Montagnola)

16 August 1988 Round 7	FC Chur	1–1	Zürich	Ringstrasse, Chur
20:00	Caviezel (yellow card) 14'; Stoob (yellow card) 22'; Ferrari 69' (1:1); Manetsch (yellow card) 80'	FCZ summary	40' (0:1) Eder; (yellow card) 58' Maiano; (yellow card) 73' Răducanu	Attendance: 2,000; Referee: (Switzerland) Werner Müller (Obererlinsbach)

27 August 1988 Round 8	Zürich	7–1	FC Glarus	Letzigrund, Zürich
20:00	Müller 25' (pen.); Müller 45' (pen.); Şahin 63' (3:1); Gilli 65' (4:1); Landolt 70' (5:1); 73' (6:1); Şahin 84' (7:1)	FCZ summary	27' (1:1) Lötscher	Attendance: 5,100; Referee: (Switzerland) Andreas Weber (Bern)

31 August 1988 Round 9	Zürich	6–2	Locarno	Letzigrund, Zürich
20:00	Răducanu 6' (1:0); Maiano 8' (2:0); Răducanu 41' (3:1); Şahin 52' (4:1); Müller 77' (pen.); Maiano { 86' (6:2); Andracchio (yellow card)	FCZ summary	29' (2:1) Kurz; 54' (4:2) Niedermayer; (yellow card) Forestier; (yellow card) Laydu	Attendance: 2,600; Referee: (Switzerland) Marcel Despland (Yverdon-les-Bains)

10 September 1988 Round 10	Old Boys	3–0	Zürich	Stadion Schützenmatte, Basel
20:00	Kägi (yellow card) 45'; Hauser 66' (1:0); Hauser 74' (2:0); Hauser (yellow card) 80'; Hauser 86' (3:0)	FCZ summary	(yellow card) 38' Maiano; (yellow card) 65' Eder	Attendance: 1,300; Referee: (Switzerland) Robert Grisch (Schaanwald)
Note: Despite the victory, Old Boys coach Marcel Hottiger was dismissed after the game due to unmet objectives.

17 September 1988 Round 11	Zürich	3–1	Schaffhausen	Letzigrund, Zürich
20:00	Şahin 55' (1:0); Andracchio 59' (2:0); Răducanu (yellow card) 65'; Şahin 69' (3:0)	FCZ summary	(yellow card) 40' Sengör; 66' (2:1) Krebs; (yellow card) 67' Mercanti	Attendance: 2,600; Referee: (Switzerland) Pierre-Alain Vuillemin (Geneva)

24 September 1988 Round 12	Basel	2–2	Zürich	St. Jakob Stadium, Basel
20:00	Esposito 18' (1:1); Mata 58' (2:1); Dittus (yellow card) 62'	FCZ summary FCB summary	4' (0:1) Şahin; (yellow card) 8' Şahin; (yellow card) 59' B. Studer; 63' (2:2) J. Studer; (yellow card) 85' Gilli	Attendance: 8,500; Referee: (Switzerland) Ludwig Zurkirchen (Zell, Lucerne)

1 October 1988 Round 13	Zürich	2–1	Baden	Letzigrund, Zürich
20:00	Landolt 51' (1:1); Landolt 85' (2:1); B. Studer (yellow card)	FCZ summary	(red card) 21' Born; 42' (0:1) Humbel; (yellow card) Haller; (yellow card) Humbel; (yellow card) Schneider	Attendance: 2,100; Referee: (Switzerland) Manfred Schlup, (Grenchen)

9 October 1988 Round 14	FC Emmenbrücke	3–3	Zürich	Stadion Gersag, Emmen
14:30	Roth 35' (1:3); Greber 56' (2:3); Hölzgen 77' (3:3)	FCZ summary	6' (0:1) Şahin; 27' (0:2) Şahin; 33' (0:3) Şahin; (yellow card) 56' Landolt; (yellow card) 81' Şahin	Attendance: 1,500; Referee: (Switzerland) Marco Raveglia (San Vittore)

16 October 1988 Round 15	Zürich	2–2	Chiasso	Letzigrund, Zürich
14:30	Eder 10' (1:0); Eder (yellow card) 33'; Paradiso 70' (2:2)	FCZ summary	15' (1:1) Bordoli; 27' (1:2) Bordoli; (yellow card) 39' Zjajo; (yellow card) 65' Malnati; (yellow card) 69' Kalbermatter	Attendance: 2,800; Referee: (Switzerland) Paul-Louis Christe (Lausanne)

23 October 1988 Round 16	Winterthur	1–1	Zürich	Schützenwiese, Winterthur
14:30	Jakovljev (yellow card) 62'; Gurrieri 65' (1:1)	FCZ summary	55' (0:1) Landolt; (yellow card) 64' Uccella	Attendance: 4,700; Referee: (Switzerland) Willi Rudin (Liestal)

30 October 1988 Round 17	Zürich	1–0	SC Zug	Letzigrund, Zürich
14:30	Şahin 28' (1:0); Landolt (yellow card) 63'; Gilli (yellow card) 81'	FCZ summary	(yellow card) 20' Nussbaumer; (yellow card) 67' Schwarz; (yellow card) 82' Pekas	Attendance: 2,300; Referee: (Switzerland) Flavio Scalena (Montagnola)

6 November 1988 Round 18	Zürich	9–2	FC Chur	Letzigrund, Zürich
14:30	Müller 10' (pen.); Moro 19' (2:0); Şahin 22' (3:0); Andracchio 39' (4:0); Şahin 59' (5:0); Răducanu 62' (6:0); Şahin 73' (7:0); J. Studer 87' (8:3); Şahin 89' (9:1)	FCZ summary	75' (7:1) Ferrari; 83' (pen. 7:3) Sitek; (yellow card) Verveer; (yellow card) Strebel; (yellow card) Manetsch	Attendance: 2,200; Referee: (Switzerland) André Reck (Birsfelden)

20 November 1988 Round 19	FC Glarus	1–2	Zürich	Buchholz, Glarus
20:00	Di Renzo 26' (1:1); (yellow card) 51' Berger; (yellow card) 67' Noser; (yellow card) 71' Lötscher	FCZ summary	24' (0:1) Şahin; (yellow card) 60' Knutti; (yellow card) 66' Landolt; 80' (1:2) Răducanu	Attendance: 2,100; Referee: (Switzerland) Charles-Henri Morex (Bex)

27 November 1988 Round 20	Locarno	2–2	Zürich	Stadio del Lido, Locarno
14:30	Schönwetter 66' (1:2); Laydu (yellow card) 75'; Omini 87' (2:2)	FCZ summary	(yellow card) 71' Uccella; 33' (0:1) Uccella; 62' (0:2) Müller; (yellow card) 90' Landolt	Attendance: 2,000; Referee: (Switzerland) Freddy Philippoz (Sion)

4 December 1988 Round 21	Zürich	1–0	Old Boys	Letzigrund, Zürich
14:30	Eder (yellow card) 46'; Maiano 57' (1:0)	FCZ summary		Attendance: 1,900; Referee: (Switzerland) Marino Paggiola (Appenzell)

11 December 1988 Round 22	Schaffhausen	1–1	Zürich	Stadion Breite, Schaffhausen
14:30	Sengör (yellow card) 15'; Mercanti (yellow card) 36'; Sengör 80' (1:1)	FCZ summary	1' (0:1) Şahin; (yellow card) 14' Andracchio	Attendance: 3,000; Referee: (Switzerland) Serge Muhmenthaler (Grenchen)

==== Qualification table ====
Pos	Team	Pld	W	D	L	GF	GA	GD	Pts	Qualification
1	Basel	22	14	4	4	48	23	+25	32	Advance to promotion round
2	Locarno	22	12	6	4	58	28	+30	30	Advance to promotion round
3	Zürich	22	11	8	3	62	32	+30	30	Advance to promotion round
4	Baden	22	10	4	8	44	29	+15	24	Advance to promotion round
5	Old Boys	22	10	4	8	37	29	+8	24	Advance to promotion round
6	Chiasso	22	8	8	6	35	33	+2	24	Advance to promotion round
7	FC Schaffhausen	22	9	6	7	32	36	−4	24	Continue in relegation round
8	Winterthur	22	8	6	8	39	36	+3	22	Continue in relegation round
9	Emmenbrücke	22	7	5	10	31	41	−10	19	Continue in relegation round
10	Chur	22	4	8	10	27	54	−27	16	Continue in relegation round
11	SC Zug	22	3	5	14	14	47	−33	11	Continue in relegation round
12	FC Glarus	22	2	4	16	19	58	−39	8	Continue in relegation round

Source: rsssf.com
Rules for classification: 1) Points; 2) Goal difference; 3) Goals scored; 4) Head-to-head points; 5) Away goals scored; 6) Draw.

==== Promotion/relegation group A ====
18 March 1989 Round 1	Zürich	2–1	Grenchen	Letzigrund, Zürich
17:30	Gilli 24' (1:1); B. Studer 88' (2:1)	FCZ summary	4' (o.g.) (Landolt)	Attendance: 3,300; Referee: (Switzerland) Francesco Bianchi (Chiasso)

27 March 1989 Round 2	Basel	1–1	Zürich	St. Jakob-Park, Basel
14:30	Moscatelli 68' (1:0); Hodel (yellow card) 83'	FCZ summary FCB summary	71' (1:1) Maiano	Attendance: 12,000; Referee: (Switzerland) Bruno Galler (Kirchdorf, Bern)
Note: Corners: 8:5

1 April 1989 Round 3	Zürich	1–1	Lausanne-Sport	Letzigrund, Zürich
20:00	(Herr) 32' (o.g.); Müller (yellow card) 43'; Maiano (yellow card) 80'	FCZ summary	(yellow card) 23' Fernandez; (yellow card) 37' Hottiger; 71' (1:1) Hartmann	Attendance: 7,200; Referee: (Switzerland) Bruno Klötzli (Bévilard)

8 April 1989 Round 4	ES Malley	0–1	Zürich	Stade du Bois-Gentil, Lausanne
17:30	Gavillet (yellow card) 34'	FCZ summary	64' (0:1) Răducanu; (yellow card) 90' Landolt	Attendance: 2,100; Referee: (Switzerland) Willi Rudin (Liestal)

15 April 1989 Round 5	Zürich	3–0	Chênois	Letzigrund, Zürich
20:00	Şahin 6' (1:0); Müller (yellow card) 51'; Şahin 72' (2:0); Răducanu 84' (3:0)	FCZ summary	(yellow card) 80' Esterházy	Attendance: 3,500; Referee: (Switzerland) Marco Raveglia (San Vittore)
Note: Before the start of the game, a minute's silence was observed for the victims of the Hillsborough disaster in Sheffield.

29 April 1989 Round 6	Zürich	2–3	St. Gallen	Letzigrund, Zürich
20:00	Thévenaz (yellow card) 24'; Şahin 27' (1:2); Landolt 64' (2:3); Paradiso (yellow card) 68'; Maiano (yellow card) 73'	FCZ summary	2' (0:1) Zamorano; 12' (0:2) Zamorano; (yellow card) 20' (yellow-red card) 67' Pitsch; (yellow card) 28' Irizik; 32' (1:3) Gambino; (yellow card) 40' Hengartner; (yellow card) 64' Fischer	Attendance: 8,500; Referee: (Switzerland) Serge Muhmenthaler (Grenchen)

6 May 1989 Round 7	Old Boys	1–6	Zürich	Stadion Schützenmatte, Basel
20:00	Erlachner 38' (1:2)	FCZ summary	14' (0:1) Şahin; 33' (0:2) Răducanu; 48' (1:3) Maiano; (yellow card) 57' Landolt; 57' (1:4) B. Studer; 62' (1:5) B. Studer; 66' (1:6) Şahin	Attendance: 1,500; Referee: (Switzerland) Jean-Claude Craviolini

15 May 1989 Round 8	Grenchen	2–0	Zürich	Stadion Brühl, Grenchen
17:30	Hirschi (yellow card) 41'; Jäggi 76' (1:0); Wenger 90' (2:0)	FCZ summary	(yellow card) 85' Andracchio	Attendance: 1,500; Referee: (Switzerland) Marco Raveglia (San Vittore)

20 May 1989 Round 9	Zürich	0–2	Basel	Letzigrund, Zürich
20:00	Şahin (yellow card) 21'	FCZ summary FCB summary	(yellow card) 6' Ceccaroni; 18' (0:1) Syfrig; (yellow card) 52' Mata; (yellow card) 78' Moscatelli; (yellow card) 80' Bernauer; 89' (0:2) Moscatelli	Attendance: 6,000; Referee: (Switzerland) Freddy Philippoz (Sion)

23 May 1989 Round 10	Lausanne-Sport	6–1	Zürich	Olympique de la Pontaise, Lausanne
20:00	(Landolt) 24' (o.g.); Schürmann 26' (2:0); Hartmann 60' (3:0); Thychosen 77' (4:1); Hartmann 79' (5:1); Aeby 82' (pen.)	FCZ summary	74' (pen.) Müller	Attendance: 4,000; Referee: (Switzerland) Kurt Röthlisberger (Suhr, Aargau)

27 May 1989 Round 11	Zürich	9–1	ES Malley	Letzigrund, Zürich
20:00	Răducanu 15' (1:0); Müller 17' (2:0); Maiano 24' (3:0); Andracchio 35' (4:0); Şahin 59' (5:0); Müller 68' (6:0); Şahin 70' (7:0); Răducanu 77' (8:1); Kok 86' (9:1)	FCZ summary	72' (pen.) Gavillet	Attendance: 1,137; Referee: (Switzerland) Peter Bochsler (Basel)

3 June 1989 Round 12	Chênois	2–0	Zürich	Stade des Trois-Chêne, Thônex
20:00	Esterházy 21' (1:0); Navarro 90' (2:0)	FCZ summary		Attendance: 600; Referee: (Switzerland) Manfred Schlup, (Grenchen)

6 June 1989 Round 14	Zürich	2–1	Old Boys	Letzigrund, Zürich
20:00	Şahin 15' (1:0); Şahin 47' (2:0)	FCZ summary	60' (2:1) Erlachner	Attendance: 550; Referee: (Switzerland) Francis Fischer (Arch)
Note: Regarding the number of spectators, the Tages-Anzeiger (June 7, 1989) noted: “Officially there were 550, in reality perhaps half.”

10 June 1989 Round 13	St. Gallen	2–1	Zürich	Espenmoos, St. Gallen
17:30	Lehnherr 68' (1:1); Metzler 90' (2:1)	FCZ summary	55' (0:1) Müller	Attendance: 5,200; Referee: (Switzerland) Bruno Klötzli (Bévilard)
Note: Thanks to sponsors, entry prices reduced by up to 70%.

==== Table group A ====
Pos	Team	Pld	W	D	L	GF	GA	GD	Pts	Qualification
1	St. Gallen	14	10	3	1	30	13	+17	23	Remain in Nationalliga A 1989–90
2	Lausanne-Sport	14	9	4	1	42	8	+34	22	Remain in Nationalliga A 1989–90
3	Zürich	14	6	2	6	29	23	+6	14	Remain in 1989–90 Nationalliga B
4	Basel	14	4	6	4	19	21	−2	14	Remain in 1989–90 Nationalliga B
5	Chênois	14	4	4	6	22	29	−7	12	Remain in 1989–90 Nationalliga B
6	Grenchen	14	3	4	7	17	26	−9	10	Remain in 1989–90 Nationalliga B
7	ES Malley	14	2	6	6	15	29	−14	10	Remain in 1989–90 Nationalliga B
8	Old Boys	14	3	1	10	13	38	−25	7	Remain in 1989–90 Nationalliga B

Source: rsssf.com
Rules for classification: 1) Points; 2) Goal difference; 3) Goals scored; 4) Head-to-head points; 5) Away goals scored; 6) Draw.

=== Swiss Cup ===
20 August 1988 Round 2	FC Rorschach	0–8	Zürich	Sportplatz Pestalozzi, Rorschach
		FCZ summary	7' (0:1) Studer; 24' (0:2) Müller; 43' (0:3) Landolt; 48' (0:4) Gilli; 57' (0:5) Şahin; 59' (0:6) Maiano; 82' (0:7) Răducanu; 89' (0:8) Landolt	Attendance: 1,500; Referee: (Switzerland) Gritsch (Schaanwald

3 September 1988 Round 3	Zürich	1–2	St. Gallen	Letzigrund, Zürich
	Şahin 10' (1:0)	FCZ summary	(yellow card) 8' Fischer; (yellow card) 36' Metzler; 64' (1:1) Piserchia; 73' (1:2) Braschler; (yellow card) Braschler	Attendance: 5,200; Referee: (Switzerland) Franz Gächter (Aarau, Suhr, Aargau)
Note: Due to a power fail, the half-time break lasted 22 minutes.

=== Friendly matches ===
==== Pre-season ====
26 June 1988 Exhibition game	Zürich	2–0	Bellinzona	Utogrund, Zürich
	Schlumpf 6' (1:0); Schlumpf 75' (2:0)	FCZ summary		Attendance: 1,000

6 July 1988 Exhibition game	La Chaux-de-Fonds	1–1	Zürich	Noiraigue
	Lovis 4' (1:0)	FCZ summary	40' (1:1) J. Studer

10 July 1988 Exhibition game	ES Malley	5–1	Zürich	Malley
	Goal	FCZ summary	Goal

16 July 1988 Exhibition game	Young Boys	1–2	Zürich	Wankdorf Stadium, Bern
	Sutter (1:0)	FCZ summary	(1:1) J. Studer (1:2) Moro	Attendance: 2,000
Note: Nissan-Cup, Semi-final.

19 July 1988 Exhibition game	Twente Enschede	0–0 (5–4 p)	Zürich	Wankdorf Stadium, Bern
		FCZ summary
	Penalties
	Penalty scored		(penalty scored) (penalty scored) (penalty scored) (penalty scored) (penalty missed) Stoob missed the decisive penalty.
Note: Nissan-Cup, Final

26 September 1988 Mid-season	Zürich	1–4	Darmstadt	Letzigrund, Zürich
	Şahin 45' (1:1)	FCZ summary	30' (0:1) Trares; 55' (1:2) Prinzen; 61' (1:3) Eichenauer; 63' (1:4) Sánchez	Attendance: 500; Referee: (Switzerland) René Kellenberger (Herisau und Zollikon)
Note: Darmstadt played in the 2nd Bundesliga in 1988.

==== Winter break ====
18 February 1989 Exhibition game	Lugano	1–1	Zürich	Cornaredo, Lugano
	Sylvestre 32' (1:1)	FCZ summary	5' (0:2) Müller	Attendance: 500; Referee: (Switzerland) Rossi (Ascona)

19 February 1989 Exhibition game	Locarno	0–5	Zürich	Stadio del Lido, Locarno
		FCZ summary	19' (0:1) Paradiso; 35' (0:2) Şahin; 53' (0:2) Uccella; 56' (0:4) Şahin; 85' (0:5) Paradiso	Attendance: 1,100; Referee: (Switzerland) Marco Raveglia (San Vittore)

23 February 1989 Exhibition game	Rot-Weiss Essen	0–1	Zürich	Stadion im Sportzentrum, Hennef
		FCZ summary	50' (0:1) Thévenaz

23 February 1989 Exhibition game	Bayer 04 Leverkusen Amateure	1–1	Zürich	Stadion im Sportzentrum, Hennef
	(1:1)	FCZ summary	(0:1) Kok

5 March 1989 Exhibition game	Bellinzona	4–1	Zürich	Stadio Comunale Bellinzona, Bellinzona
	Rössli 9' (1:0); Türkyilmaz 21' (2:1); Türkyilmaz 40' (3:1); Jacobacci 50' (4:1)	FCZ summary	20' (1:1) Landolt	Attendance: 400

8 March 1989 Exhibition game	Zürich	1–5	Wettingen	Letzigrund, Zürich
	Paradiso 17' (1:2)	FCZ summary	2' (0:1) Heldmann; 10' (0:2) Bertelsen; 44' (1:3) Pellegrini; 49' (pen.) Rueda; 74' (1:5) Peterhans	Attendance: 350; Referee: (Switzerland) René Kellenberger (Herisau)

12 March 1989 Exhibition game	Bulle	0–0	Zürich	Stade de Bouleyres, Bulle
		FCZ summary		Attendance: 300; Referee: (Switzerland) Willy Hänni, (Cugy)

== Sources ==
- dbFCZ Homepage
- Switzerland 1988–89 at RSSSF

Preceded by 1987–88	FC Zürich seasons	Succeeded by 1989–90
