= Olivier Rey =

French mathematician and philosopher

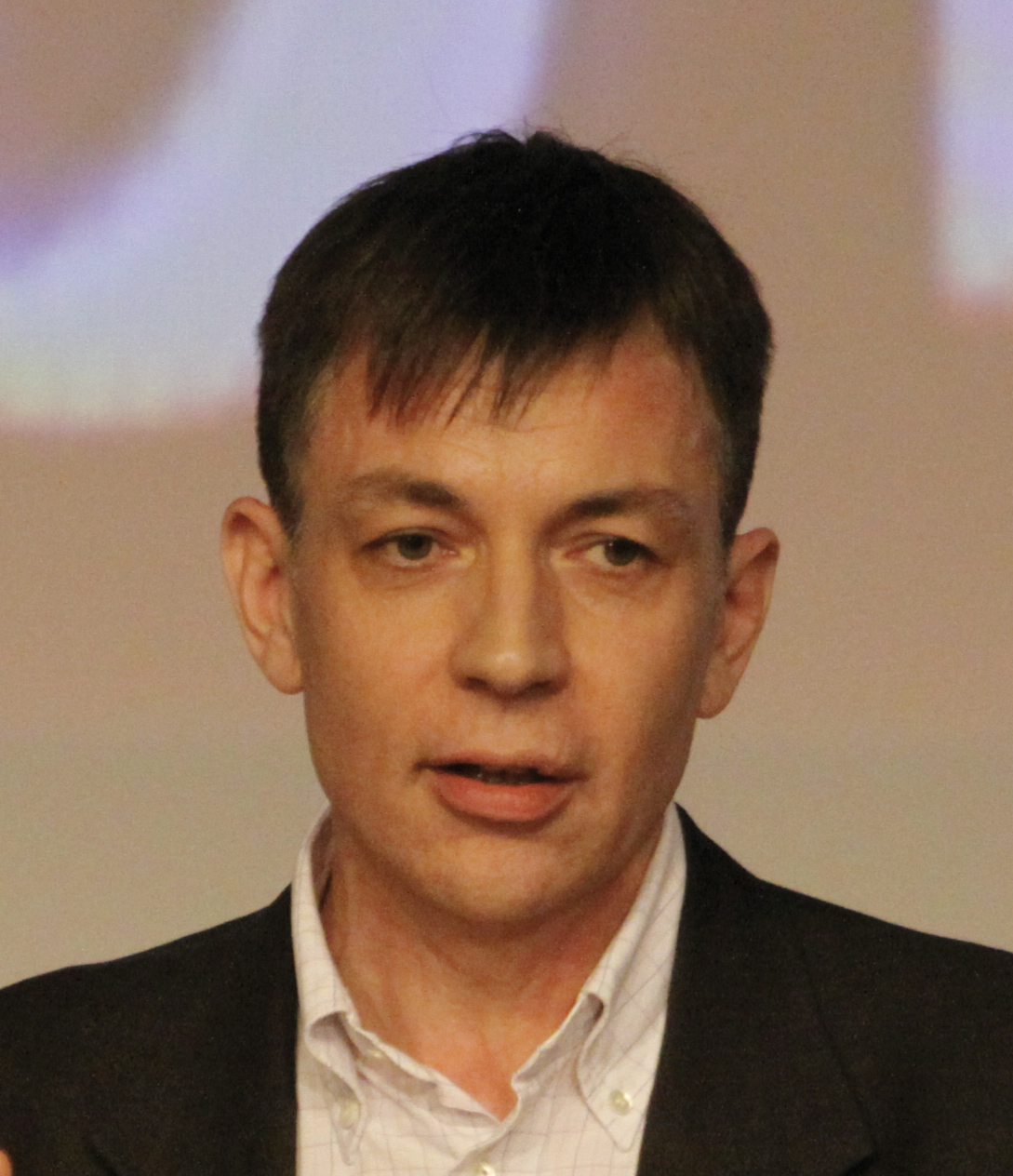
- Olivier Rey (2014)
- Born: 1964 (age 61–62); Nantes, France
- Occupation: Philosopher

Olivier Donatien Rey (birth 1964 in Nantes), is a French philosopher of science.

== Works ==
The majority of his works focus on the place of science in modern and contemporary society. He is currently affiliated to the Institut d'histoire et de philosophie des sciences et des techniques (IHPST) a mixed research unit between the University Paris-1-Sorbonne and the CNRS. He published books on the emergence of statistics and on the ethical and scientific implications of transhumanism.

Books and Essays

- (in French) Itinéraire de l'égarement. Du rôle de la science dans l'absurdité contemporaine, Le Seuil, 2003 ISBN 2-02-060537-6
- (in French) Une folle solitude. Le fantasme de l'homme auto-construit, Le Seuil, 2006 ISBN 978-2020863803
- (in French) Le Testament de Melville : Penser le bien et le mal avec Billy Budd, Gallimard, coll. « Bibliothèque des idées », 2011 ISBN 2070134903
- (in French) Une question de taille, Stock, coll. « Les essais », 2014 ISBN 978-2-234-07765-2.
- (in French) Quand le monde s'est fait nombre, Stock, coll. « Les essais », 2016 ISBN 978-2-234-07339-5
- (in French) Leurre et malheur du transhumanisme, Desclée de Brouwer, 2018 ISBN 978-2-220-09551-6
- (in French) Réparer l'eau, Stock, coll. « Les essais », 2022 ISBN 978-2234091054.
- (in French) Défécondité. Ses raisons, sa déraison, Gallimard, coll. « Tracts », no 71, 2025 ISBN 978-2-07-314628-1

=== Novels ===
- (in French) Le Bleu du sang, Flammarion, coll. « Fiction Française », 1994 ISBN 2080670336
- (in French) Après la chute, Pierre-Guillaume de Roux Éditions, 2014 ISBN 2363710789

== Awards ==
- Prix Bristol des Lumières 2014 for Une question de taille
- Grand prix of the fondation Prince Louis de Polignac 2015 (Institut de France) for his oeuvre.
- Prix Jacques Ellul 2019 for Leurre et malheur du transhumanisme.
