= FC Cortaillod =

Swiss football club

- Full name: Football Club Cortaillod
- Founded: 1955
- Ground: La Rive
- Capacity: 600
- Chairman: Joseph Pacelli
- Coach: Jose Saiz
- 2008/2009: 14th

== Introduction ==
FC Cortaillod are a football team from Switzerland who were recently relegated from the 2L Inter Group 2.

== Current squad ==
Note: Flags indicate national team as defined under FIFA eligibility rules; some limited exceptions apply. Players may hold more than one non-FIFA nationality.

No.	Pos.	Nation	Player
—	MF	(Tunisia) TUN	Brahim Bourassi
—	FW	(Switzerland) SUI	Michael Decastel

== Staff and board members ==
- President: (Switzerland) Marco Schild
- Vice President: (Switzerland) Cedric Guillod
- Treasurer : (Switzerland) Francois Cano
- Secretary : (Switzerland) Jessica Pacelli
