= Lars Larsen (footballer, born 1970) =

Danish footballer (born 1970)

Personal information
- Date of birth: 6 December 1970 (age 55)
- Place of birth: Hårslev, Denmark
- Height: 1.78 m (5 ft 10 in)
- Position: Midfielder

Youth career
- –1979: Hårslev Boldklub
- 1979–1989: B 1909

Senior career*
Years	Team	Apps	(Gls)
1989–1990	B 1909		
1990–1991	B 1913		
1991	Ikast	6	(0)
1991–1992	FC Wettingen	12	(3)
1992–1993	B 1909	12	(2)
1993–1995	AGF	35	(5)
1995–1998	Ikast	30	(4)
1998–2001	Lyngby	44	(2)
2001–2003	AB	53	(8)
2003–2008	Örebro SK	109	(20)

International career
1987	Denmark U17	2	(0)
1990–1991	Denmark U21	4	(0)
- * Club domestic league appearances and goals

Lars Larsen (born 6 December 1970) is a Danish former professional footballer who played as a midfielder.

== Career ==
Larsen was born in Hårslev, Nordfyn, Denmark. As a nine-year-old, he moved with his family to Vollsmose, a suburb of Odense, where he began playing for B 1909. He would since play for many clubs, including B 1913, FC Wettingen, AGF, Ikast, Lyngby, AB and, most notably, Swedish club Örebro SK between 2003 and 2007.

== Personal life ==
In Denmark he was nicknamed Dyne after Danish entrepreneur Lars Larsen.

Larsen is married to Swedish politician, Sofia Larsen, who has been member of the Riksdag since 1998.
