= Thomas Hartmann (footballer) =

Swiss footballer (born 1967)

Personal information
- Date of birth: 26 March 1967 (age 59)
- Position: Forward

Senior career*
Years	Team	Apps	(Gls)
1988–1990	FC Lausanne-Sport		
1991–1993	FC Bulle		
1994–1995	BSC Young Boys		
- * Club domestic league appearances and goals

Thomas Hartmann (born 26 March 1967) is a retired Swiss football striker.
