= René Morf =

Swiss footballer (born 1969)

Personal information
- Date of birth: 19 October 1969 (age 57)
- Place of birth: Winterthur, Switzerland
- Position: Defender

Senior career*
Years	Team	Apps	(Gls)
1988–2003	FC Lugano		

International career
- Switzerland u-21
- * Club domestic league appearances and goals

René Morf (born 19 October 1969) is a retired Swiss football defender. He holds the record for the most competitive games played for FC Lugano, the team he played during his entire career.
