= Víctor Sotomayor =

Argentine footballer

Personal information
- Full name: Víctor Hugo Sotomayor
- Date of birth: 21 January 1968 (age 58)
- Place of birth: Córdoba, Argentina
- Height: 1.85 m (6 ft 1 in)
- Position: Defender

Senior career*
Years	Team	Apps	(Gls)
1986–1989	Racing de Córdoba	54	(0)
1989–1991	Verona	47	(2)
1991–1992	FC Zürich	10	(2)
1992–1999	Vélez	130	(0)
1999–2002	Talleres	70	(0)

International career
1996	Argentina	1	(0)
- * Club domestic league appearances and goals

Víctor Hugo Sotomayor (born 21 January 1968, in Córdoba) is a retired Argentine football player who played for a number of clubs both in Argentina and Europe, including Club Atlético Vélez Sársfield, Talleres de Córdoba and Hellas Verona F.C.

A central defender, Sotomayor also earned one cap for Argentina, which came against the Federal Republic of Yugoslavia on 28 December 1996.
