= Thomas Madigage =

South African soccer player and coach

Personal information
- Date of birth: 14 November 1970
- Place of birth: Burgersfort, South Africa
- Date of death: 18 October 2012 (aged 41)
- Place of death: Burgersfort, South Africa
- Height: 1.70 m (5 ft 7 in)
- Position: Midfielder

Senior career*
Years	Team	Apps	(Gls)
1983–1986	Arcadia Shepherds	17	(2)
1987–1989	Jomo Cosmos	78	(14)
1990–1991	FC Zürich	1	(1)
1992	Jomo Cosmos	24	(11)
1993–2003	SuperSport United	189	(23)
Total		309	(51)

International career
1993–1997	South Africa	4	(0)
- * Club domestic league appearances and goals

Thomas Madigage (11 November 1970 – 19 October 2012) was a South African football player and coach.

== Club career ==
Born in Pretoria, Madigage started his career at Arcadia Shepherds where he played alongside Paul Matthews, the son of Roy Matthews, assistant at Jomo Cosmos. After impressing Matthews, he was spotted by Jomo Sono who brought the player to his own team, raising him as a son.

He made his debut for Jomo Cosmos at the age of 16, winning the 1987 National Soccer League in his first year at the club. In 1990, he had a trial at Rangers with fellow Cosmos player Augustine Makalakalane, but the duo was not signed. Instead, both joined Swiss side FC Zürich.

At Zürich, Madigage suffered with knee injuries and played a single league match in a 5-1 loss against FC Luzern, scoring his sole team goal. After failing to appear in further matches, he returned to Jomo Cosmos in 1992.

He later joined Pretoria City (later renamed SuperSport United), winning the 2nd division and reaching the Bob Save Super Bowl in 1995, before retiring in 2003.

== International career ==
Madigage earned four caps for the South African national team.

== Retirement ==
After retiring as a player, Madigage worked as an assistant coach for SuperSport United from 2004 to 2012 and later the South African national team.

== Later life and death ==
Madigage died in a car crash in the early hours of Friday 19 October 2012, after hitting a donkey crossing a road near Burgersfort, Limpopo. He was 41 at the time.
