= Roberto Fregno =

Swiss footballer (born 1959)

Personal information
- Date of birth: 23 February 1959 (age 67)
- Place of birth: Grenchen
- Position: Midfielder

Senior career*
Years	Team	Apps	(Gls)
1977–1981	FC Grenchen		
1981–1982	FC Locarno		
1982–1984	FC Wettingen		
1984–1986	FC Aarau		
1986–1987	FC St. Gallen		
1987–1990	AC Bellinzona		
1990–1992	FC Zürich		
1992–1993	FC Luzern		
- * Club domestic league appearances and goals

Roberto Fregno (born 23 February 1959) is a retired Swiss football midfielder.
