= Joël Corminbœuf =

Swiss footballer (born 1964)

Personal information
- Date of birth: 16 March 1964 (age 62)
- Place of birth: Fribourg, Switzerland
- Height: 1.84 m (6 ft 1/2 in)
- Position: Goalkeeper

Youth career
- 1974–1985: Domdidier

Senior career*
Years	Team	Apps	(Gls)
1985–1991	Neuchâtel Xamax		
1991	FC Zürich		
1991–1993	Neuchâtel Xamax		
1993–1994	RC Strasbourg	30	(0)
1994–2000	Neuchâtel Xamax		

International career
1988-1998	Switzerland	8	(0)
- * Club domestic league appearances and goals

Joël Corminbœuf (born 16 March 1964) is a former association football player who played as a goalkeeper. He was born in Fribourg.

He played for Neuchâtel Xamax (1985-January 1991 and September 1991 – 1993 and 1994–2000) which won two Swiss Premier League in 1987 and 1988, and also for FC Zurich and RC Strasbourg. He finished his career in 2000.

For Switzerland national football team he got 6 international caps in 1988 and was in roster for Euro 1996, but never played a match at the tournament.

== Honours ==
Neuchâtel Xamax

- Swiss Super League: 1986–87, 1987–88
- Swiss Super Cup: 1987, 1988
