= Alessandro Minelli (footballer, born 1970) =

Swiss footballer

Personal information
- Date of birth: 28 November 1970 (age 55)
- Position: Defender

Senior career*
Years	Team	Apps	(Gls)
1989–1993	FC Chiasso		
1993–1995	FC Luzern		
1999–1999	FC Locarno		
- * Club domestic league appearances and goals

Alessandro Minelli (born 28 November 1970) is a retired Swiss football defender.
