= Jürg Wittwer =

Swiss footballer (born 1959)

Personal information
- Date of birth: 25 July 1959 (age 67)
- Position: Defender

Senior career*
Years	Team	Apps	(Gls)
1978–1983	FC Bern		
1983–1991	BSC Young Boys		

International career
1986	Switzerland	3	(0)
- * Club domestic league appearances and goals

Jürg Wittwer (born 25 July 1959) is a retired Swiss football defender.

== Honours ==
- Swiss Super League:
  - Winner: 1985–86
- Swiss Super Cup:
  - Winner: 1986
- Swiss Cup:
  - Winner: 1986–87
