= Willy Scheepers =

Dutch football player (born 1961)

Personal information
- Date of birth: 8 April 1961 (age 65)
- Place of birth: Netherlands
- Height: 1.82 m (6 ft 0 in)
- Positions: Defender; midfielder

Senior career*
Years	Team	Apps	(Gls)
1978–1981	PSV	17	(0)
1981–1983	Overpelt Fabriek	?	(?)
1983–1984	AGF	43	(7)
1985	Velje	15	(2)
1985–1987	Darmstadt 98	50	(2)
1987–1988	OB	46	(1)
1988–1989	FC Glarus	?	(?)
1989–1990	FC Zürich	26	(5)
1990–1991	FC Glarus	?	(?)
1991–1993	FC Dietikon	?	(?)

International career
	Netherlands	?	(?)

Managerial career
- 1992–1994: FC Dietikon
- 1994–1997: SC Burgdorf
- 1998–1999: FC Näfels
- 2002–2004: FC Kreuzlingen
- 2005–2006: SC Konstanz-Wollmatingen
- 2006–2007: FC Oberwinterthur
- 2007–2008: FC Kreuzlingen
- 2009–2010: APEP
- 2010–2011: Bali Devata
- 2013: Nuenen
- * Club domestic league appearances and goals as of 10 March 2008

Willy Scheepers (born 8 April 1961) is a Dutch former professional football player and manager. In 2022, he was arrested and convicted of drug trafficking and money laundering in Switzerland.
