= Luca Lurati =

Swiss footballer (born 1966)

Personal information
- Date of birth: 22 August 1966 (age 60)
- Position: Midfielder

Senior career*
Years	Team	Apps	(Gls)
1987–1990	FC Chiasso		
1990–1991	FC Zürich		
- * Club domestic league appearances and goals

Luca Lurati (born 22 August 1966) is a retired Swiss football midfielder.
