= Enrico Bizzotto =

Swiss footballer (born 1965)

Personal information
- Date of birth: 7 September 1965 (age 61)
- Position: Midfielder

Senior career*
| Years | Team | Apps | (Gls) |
| 1984–1985 | FC Luzern | | |
| 1985 | FC Zug | | |
| 1989–1991 | FC Zürich | | |
- * Club domestic league appearances and goals

Enrico Bizzotto (born 7 September 1965) is a retired Swiss football midfielder.
