= John Jairo Tréllez =

Colombian footballer (born 1968)

Personal information
- Full name: John Jairo Trellez Valencia
- Date of birth: April 29, 1968 (age 58)
- Place of birth: Turbo, Colombia
- Height: 6 ft 4 in (1.93 m)
- Position: Striker

Senior career*
Years	Team	Apps	(Gls)
1985–1989	Atlético Nacional	217	(116)
1989–1991	FC Zürich	33	(12)
1991–1994	Atlético Nacional		
1994	Boca Juniors	16	(3)
1995–1996	EC Juventude	86	(18)
1997–1998	Al-Hilal		
1999	Dallas Burn	17	(3)
2001–2004	Zhejiang Greentown		
2005–2006	Bajo Cauca		

International career
1987–1994	Colombia	25	(3)
- * Club domestic league appearances and goals

John Jairo Tréllez Valencia (Latin American Spanish: [ɟʝoŋ ˈxajɾo ˈtɾeʝes]; (Note: In isolation, John is pronounced [ɟʝon].) born 29 April 1968) is a retired Colombian footballer. A striker, he played most of his career with Atlético Nacional of Medellín. He has a son, also a striker, Santiago Tréllez.

== Career ==
Tréllez was born in Turbo, Antioquia, and started playing for Atlético Nacional in 1985. He scored his first goal as professional the same day the debuted against Cúcuta Deportivo. With Atlético Nacional Tréllez scored a total of 116 goals, 14 of which were against Independiente Medellín, Atlético Nacional's eternal rivals. In 1992, he became the top goal scorer in Colombia with 25 goals, becoming the first Colombian to become the league's goal scorer for Atlético Nacional. In 1994, Tréllez became the first Colombian to ever play for Boca Juniors of Argentina, where he scored two goals in 19 games, in all competitions.

At the international level, Tréllez also played two seasons for FC Zürich and then played in the United States for the Dallas Burn.

== Honours ==
- Colombian Championship winner with Atlético Nacional (1991)
- Copa Libertadores Championship winner with Atlético Nacional (1989)
