= Christoph Gilli =

Swiss footballer (1963–2010)

Personal information
- Date of birth: 17 June 1963
- Place of birth: Littau
- Date of death: 26 May 2010 (aged 46)
- Position: Defender

Senior career*
Years	Team	Apps	(Gls)
1983–1985	SC Zug		
1985–1987	FC Aarau		
1987–1988	AC Bellinzona		
1988–1992	FC Zürich		
1992–1994	FC Luzern		

International career
1986	Switzerland	1	(0)
- * Club domestic league appearances and goals

Christoph Gilli (17 June 1963 – 26 May 2010) was a Swiss football defender.
