= August Makalakalane =

South African soccer player

Personal information
- Date of birth: 15 September 1963 (age 63)
- Place of birth: South Africa
- Height: 1.73 m (5 ft 8 in)
- Position: Midfielder

Senior career*
| Years | Team | Apps | (Gls) |
| 1984–1989 | Jomo Cosmos | ? | (?) |
| 1990–1992 | FC Zürich | 74 | (11) |
| 1993–1995 | FC Baden | 72 | (33) |
| 1995–1996 | FC Zürich | 31 | (1) |
| 1996–1997 | FC Baden | 0 | (0) |
| 1997–1998 | Mamelodi Sundowns | ? | (?) |
| 1998–1999 | Wits University | ? | (?) |
| Total | | 177 | (45) |

International career
| 1992–1996 | South Africa | 14 | (0) |

Managerial career
- 2002: Black Leopards (caretaker)
- 2006–2011: South Africa Women
- * Club domestic league appearances and goals

Augustine Makalakalane (born 15 September 1963) is a South African former soccer player who played at both professional and international levels as a midfielder.

Makalakalane played club football in South Africa for Jomo Cosmos, Mamelodi Sundowns and Wits University and was the first South African to play in Switzerland having represented FC Zürich and FC Baden. He also earned 14 caps for the South African national side between 1992 and 1996, and was part of the squad that won the 1996 African Cup of Nations.

After retiring, he worked as coach, first taking charge of Black Leopards in 2002 and then the South Africa women's national football team until 2011, when he was dismissed for sexually harassing his players. He was later appointed as soccer institute coach at the North-West University.
