= Sven Hotz =

Swiss football executive (1929–2025)

Sven Hotz (12 October 1929 – 7 December 2025) was a Swiss property dealer and the president of the football team FC Zürich.

== Early life and career ==
Hotz was raised in Zurich; he had three brothers and two sisters. He joined FC Zürich at the age of twelve. For over twenty years, he served as president and patron of the club.

Hotz resigned as the president of FC Zürich in 2006. He was given a farewell ceremony before the championship match between FC Zürich and FC Sion in front of 11,600 spectators at the Hardturm Stadium.

== Personal life and death ==
Hotz was married to Ruth Hotz and had five children.

Hotz died on 7 December 2025, at the age of 96.
