= Kurt Röthlisberger =

Swiss football referee (born 1951)

- Born: May 21, 1951 (age 75); Suhr, Switzerland

Domestic
Years	League	Role
1983–1996	Nationalliga A	Referee

International
Years	League	Role
1985–1996	FIFA-listed	Referee

Kurt Röthlisberger (born 21 May 1951 in Suhr) is a retired football referee from Switzerland. He is known for supervising five matches in the FIFA World Cup: three matches in 1990, and two in 1994.

== Career ==
In the 1994 World Cup, he refereed the round of 16 match between Germany and Belgium, which Germany won 3–2. Röthlisberger later admitted that he missed a penalty when Thomas Helmer tripped Josip Weber in the penalty area against Germany and due to this mistake he did not referee another game in the tournament.

He also refereed the 1992-93 UEFA Champions League final between Olympique de Marseille and A.C. Milan.

He was later banned from refereeing for life after allegations of match fixing in the 1996-97 UEFA Champions League. The game in question was between Grasshoppers Club Zürich and AJ Auxerre, with Vadim Zhuk of Belarus the referee. UEFA said Röthlisberger contacted the Swiss team and asked if it would be interested in having the referee favor the Grasshoppers.
