= Vincent Fournier (footballer) =

Swiss footballer (born 1961)

Personal information
- Date of birth: 13 September 1961 (age 65)
- Position: Defender

Senior career*
Years	Team	Apps	(Gls)
1980–1988	FC Sion		
1988–1992	FC Zürich		

International career
- Switzerland u-21
- * Club domestic league appearances and goals

Vincent Fournier (born 13 September 1961) is a retired Swiss football defender.

== Honours ==
=== Player ===
FC Sion

- Swiss Cup: 1981–82, 1985–86
