= Michael Mazenauer =

Swiss footballer (born 1971)

Personal information
- Date of birth: 18 September 1971 (age 55)
- Position: Midfielder

Senior career*
Years	Team	Apps	(Gls)
1987–1993	FC Zürich		
1993–1994	FC Chiasso		
1994–1995	FC Aarau		

International career
- Switzerland u-21
- * Club domestic league appearances and goals

Michael Mazenauer (born 18 September 1971) is a retired Swiss football midfielder.
