= 1993–94 FC Zürich season =

FC Zürich
1993–94 season
- Owner: Sven Hotz
- Chairman: Sven Hotz
- Head-coach from then: Kurt Jara until 1 April 1994; Bob Houghton
- Stadium: Letzigrund
- 1993–94 Nationalliga A Qualification round: 9th of 12
- Promotion/relegation group: 4th of 8
- 1993–94 Swiss Cup: Semi-finals
- 1993 Intertoto Cup: Group winners

The 1993–94 season was FC Zürich's 97th season in their existence, since their foundation in 1896. It was their fourth consecutive season in the top flight of Swiss football, following their promotion at the end of 1989–90 season.

== Overview ==
Since the AGM in 1986 the local businessman Sven Hotz was the club's chairman and patron. Kurt Jara was the FCZ first team head-coach and he started his third year in that position this season. The FCZ first team competed in this years domestic first-tier 1993–94 Nationalliga A with the clear intention of retaining their top level status. The team also competed in 1993–94 Swiss Cup. They had not qualified for any of the UEFA European tournaments, but they did enter the 1993 Intertoto Cup. FCZ played their home games in the Letzigrund and the stadium is located in the west of Zurich in the district of Altstetten, which is about three kilometers from the city center.

Coach Kurt Jara was dismissed by President Sven Hotz immediately after the end of the game on 8 April 1994 as FCZ lost by three goals to nil against St. Gallen. This was the teams third defeat in eight days, including the Cup semi-final against Grasshopper Club. He was replaced by Bob Houghton, who had spent the previous year coaching Al-Ittihad in Jeddah, Saudi Arabia, but was at this moment without a contract.

== Players ==
The following is the list of the FCZ first team squad this season. It also includes players that were in the squad the day the domestic league season started, on 18 July 1992, but subsequently left the club after that date.

Note: Flags indicate national team as defined under FIFA eligibility rules; some limited exceptions apply. Players may hold more than one non-FIFA nationality.

No.	Pos.	Nation	Player
—	GK	SUI	Roberto Böckli (league games: 10)
—	GK	SUI	Patrick Mäder (league games: 28)
—	DF	YUG	Mirsad Baljić (league games: 13)
—	DF	SUI	Marc Hodel (league games: 33)
—	DF	SUI	Marcel Hotz (league games: 8)
—	DF	SUI	Giuseppe Mazzarelli (league games: 32)
—	DF	SUI	Umberto Romano (league games: 3)
—	DF	SUI	Beat Studer (league games: 25)
—	DF	SUI	Roland Widmer (league games: 31)
—	MF	ITA	Roberto Baldassarri (league games: 10)
—	MF	NED	Pierre Blättler (league games: 28)

No.	Pos.	Nation	Player
—	MF	GER	Rainer Ernst (league games: 16)
—	MF	SUI	Francesco Di Jorio (league games: 23)
—	MF	SUI	Ralph Heydecker (league games: 30)
—	MF	SUI	Mario Kägi (league games: 26)
—	MF	TUN	Mohamed Ali Mahjoubi (league games: 0)
—	MF	SUI	Jürg Studer (league games: 33)
—	MF	SUI	Daniel Tarone (league games: 1)
—	MF	SUI	Georgios Tzionas (league games: 2)
—	FW	SUI	Marco Grassi (league games: 17)
—	FW	TUR	Ercüment Şahin (league games: 27)
—	FW	YUG	Haris Škoro (league games: 29)
—	FW	GER	Herbert Waas (league games: 33)

Players who left the squad

The following is the list of the FCZ first team players that left the squad during the previous season or in the off-season, before the new domestic season began.

Note: Flags indicate national team as defined under FIFA eligibility rules; some limited exceptions apply. Players may hold more than one non-FIFA nationality.

No.	Pos.	Nation	Player
—	DF	SUI	Alexander Germann (to Kriens)
—	DF	SUI	Urs Isler (to Baden)
—	MF	BRA	Luiz Milton (to Sion)
—	MF	SUI	Matthias Bärlocher (to Baden)

No.	Pos.	Nation	Player
—	MF	ITA	Mario Casamento (to Baden)
—	MF	RSA	August Makalakalane (to Baden)
—	MF	SUI	Michael Mazenauer (to Chiasso)
—	FW	SUI	David Sesa (to Baden)

== Results ==
Legend

Win Draw Loss Postponed

=== Nationalliga A ===
==== Qualification phase ====
28 July 1993 Round 1	Zürich	1–0	Sion	Letzigrund, Zürich
20:00	Blättler 57' (1:0); Škoro (yellow card) 83'	FCZ summary	(yellow card) 84' Quentin	Attendance: 7,600; Referee: (Switzerland) Kurt Röthlisberger (Suhr, Aargau)

31 July 1993 Round 2	Young Boys	0–0	Zürich	Wankdorf Stadium, Bern
20:00	Nowak (yellow card) 78'	FCZ summary	(yellow card) 25' (yellow-red card) 70' Grassi; (yellow card) 53' Şahin; (yellow card) 73' J. Studer	Attendance: 6,500; Referee: (Switzerland) Freddy Philippoz (Sion)

7 August 1993 Round 3	Zürich	0–0	Yverdon-Sports	Letzigrund, Zürich
20:00	Blättler (yellow card) 66'; Şahin (yellow card) 88'	FCZ summary	(yellow card) 13' Luís Carlos; (yellow card) 50' Castella	Attendance: 4,100; Referee: (Switzerland) Karl Strässle (Steinach)

14 August 1993 Round 4	Kriens	0–2	Zürich	Stadion Kleinfeld, Kriens
20:00	De Simone (yellow card) 28'; Mouidi (yellow card) 54'	FCZ summary	53' (0:1) Waas; 70' (0:2) Waas	Attendance: 2,400; Referee: (Switzerland) Hans Müller (Bern)

18 August 1993 Round 5	Zürich	0–1	Servette	Letzigrund, Zürich
20:00	B. Studer (yellow card) 41'; Grassi (yellow card) 48'; Şahin (yellow card) 80'	FCZ summary	(yellow card) 7' Gjurovski; 44' (0:1) Anderson	Attendance: 6,100; Referee: (Switzerland) Michel Zen-Ruffinen

21 August 1993 Round 6	Zürich	3–1	Aarau	Letzigrund, Zürich
20:00	Baljić 21' (1:0); Mazzarelli (yellow card) 27'; Baljić 41' (2:1); Widmer (yellow card) 53'; Baljić (yellow card) 73'; Kägi 80' (3:1)	FCZ summary FCA summary	40' (1:1) Romano	Attendance: 5,100; Referee: (Switzerland) Andreas Schluchter (Schönenbuch)

25 August 1993 Round 7	Xamax	0–0	Zürich	Stade de la Maladière, Neuchâtel
20:00	Ramzy (yellow card) 53'	FCZ summary	(yellow card) 29' Baljić; (yellow card) 37' Grassi; (yellow card) 57' J. Studer	Attendance: 9,800; Referee: (Switzerland) Kurt Röthlisberger (Suhr, Aargau)

31 August 1993 Round 8	Zürich	4–0	Lausanne-Sport	Letzigrund, Zürich
20:00	B. Studer 17' (1:0); B. Studer (yellow card) 35'; Grassi 45' (2:0); Grassi 62' (3:0); Heydecker (yellow card) 68'; Şahin 87' (4:0)	FCZ summary	(yellow card) 16' Calderón; (yellow card) 60' Biaggi	Attendance: 5,700; Referee: (Switzerland) Daniel Roduit (Sion)

11 September 1993 Round 11	Zürich	4–0	Luzern	Letzigrund, Zürich
20:00	Grassi (yellow card) 29'; B. Studer (yellow card) 31'; Waas 36' (1:0); J. Studer (yellow card) 49'; Grassi 74' (2:0); Şahin 84' (3:0); Kägi 87' (4:0)	FCZ summary	(yellow card) 78' Schällibaum; (yellow card) 79' Güntensperger	Attendance: 6,800; Referee: (Switzerland) Manfred Schlup, (Grenchen)
Note: Match brought forward from 28 September.

22 September 1993 Round 9	Lugano	2–2	Zürich	Cornaredo, Lugano
20:00	Subiat 22' (1:1); Fernandez (yellow card) 44'; Andrioli 89' (pen. 2:2)	FCZ summary	2' (0:1) Baljić; (yellow card) 20' Kägi; (yellow card) 29' (yellow-red card) 90+2' Baljić; 73' (1:2) Waas; (yellow card) 84' Blättler	Attendance: 2,500; Referee: (Switzerland) Daniel Roduit (Sion)

25 September 1993 Round 10	Grasshopper Club	2–0	Zürich	Hardturm, Zürich
17:00	Willems 30' (1:0); Élber (yellow card) 30'; Willems (yellow card) 33'; Lombardo (yellow card) 44'; Élber 56' (2:0); Bickel (yellow card) 65'	FCZ summary	(yellow card) 35' Şahin; (yellow card) 42' J. Studer; (yellow card) 88' Widmer	Attendance: 10,300; Referee: (Switzerland) Werner Müller (Obererlinsbach)

2 October 1993 Round 12	Sion	P–P	Zürich	Stade Tourbillon, Sion
		[ FCZ summary]		Referee: (Switzerland)

6 October 1993 Round 13	Zürich	1–2	Young Boys	Letzigrund, Zürich
20:00	Blättler 33' (1:1); Grassi (yellow card) 65'	FCZ summary	(yellow card) 16' Markovic; 32' (0:1) Markovic; 38' (1:2) Markovic; (yellow card) 90' Porfido	Attendance: 3,700; Referee: (Switzerland) Karl Strässle (Steinach)
Note: Coach Jara Was suspended and took a seat in the stands.

16 October 1993 Round 14	Yverdon-Sports	1–1	Zürich	Stade Municipal, Yverdon
20:00	Luís Carlos 31' (1:0); Karlen (yellow card) 70'; Wicht (yellow card) 75'	FCZ summary	(yellow card) 32' B. Studer; 42' (1:1) Waas; (yellow card) 59' Grassi; (yellow card) 64' Widmer	Attendance: 2,650; Referee: (Switzerland) Andreas Schluchter (Schönenbuch)

23 October 1993 Round 15	Zürich	0–1	Kriens	Letzigrund, Zürich
20:00	Baljić (yellow card) 8'; Grassi (yellow card) 22'; B. Studer (yellow card) 37'	FCZ summary	(yellow card) 21' Berchtold; (yellow card) 32' Heitzmann; 84' (0:1) Rossi; (yellow card) 90' Rossi	Attendance: 2,200; Referee: (Switzerland) Dieter Schoch (Attiswil)

26 October 1993 Round 12	Sion	3–1	Zürich	Stade Tourbillon, Sion
20:00	Assis 63' (1:1); Marcio 76' (2:1); Assis 83' (3:1)	FCZ summary	16' (0:1) Waas; (yellow card) 55' Kägi; (yellow card) 68' Blättler	Attendance: 6,000; Referee: (Switzerland) Werner Müller (Obererlinsbach)
Note: Rescheduled after postponement on 2 October

29 October 1993 Round 16	Servette	4–2	Zürich	Charmilles Stadium, Geneva
19:30	Barea (yellow card) 15'; Renato 25' (1:0); Anderson 42' (2:0); Egli 77' (3:2); Renato 90' (4:2)	FCZ summary	(yellow card) 17' Škoro; 59' (2:1) Baljić; 75' (2:2) Grassi; (yellow card) 82' Kägi	Attendance: 5,500; Referee: (Switzerland) Jürg Herrmann (Hinterkapplen)

10 November 1993 Round 17	Aarau	1–0	Zürich	Stadion Brügglifeld, Aarau
19:00	Pavličević 31' (1:0); Kilian (yellow card) 39'	FCZ summary	(yellow card) 38' Şahin; (yellow card) 48' Widmer; (yellow card) 54' Ernst	Attendance: 4,500; Referee: (Switzerland) Serge Muhmenthaler (Grenchen)

21 Mpvember 1993 Round 18	Zürich	2–2	Xamax	Letzigrund, Zürich
14:30	Ernst (yellow card) 10'; Škoro (yellow card) 43'; Waas 77' (1:2); Waas 90+1' (2:2); Mazzarelli (yellow card) 90+2'	FCZ summary	(yellow card) 15' Manfreda; 25' (0:1) Adriano; (yellow card) 31' Fasel; 69' (0:2) Ramzy	Attendance: 2,500; Referee: (Switzerland) Serge Muhmenthaler (Grenchen)

28 November 1993 Round 19	Lausanne-Sport	0–0	Zürich	Olympique de la Pontaise, Lausanne
14:30	Poulard (yellow card) 47'; Sogbie (yellow card) 63'	FCZ summary	(yellow card) 41' Grassi	Attendance: 4,500; Referee: (Switzerland) Werner Müller (Obererlinsbach)

1 December 1993 Round 20	Zürich	1–1	Lugano	Letzigrund, Zürich
19:00	Škoro (yellow card) 13'; Ernst (yellow card) 45'; Mazzarelli 48' (1:1)	FCZ summary	22' (1:0) Andrioli	Attendance: 1,800; Referee: (Switzerland) Kurt Röthlisberger (Suhr, Aargau)

5 December 1993 Round 21	Luzern	0–1	Zürich	Stadion Allmend, Luzern
14:30	Bertelsen (yellow card) 16'; Rueda (penalty missed) 46′ Schällibaum (yellow card) 80'	FCZ summary	25' (0:1) Baljić; (yellow card) 40' B. Studer; (yellow card) 47' Mazzarelli; (yellow card) 80' Kägi	Attendance: 8,900; Referee: (Switzerland) Serge Muhmenthaler (Grenchen)
Note: 46th minute: FCZ goalie Roberto Böckli held artin Rueda's penalty-kick.

12 December 1993 Round 22	Zürich	0–1	Grasshopper Club	Letzigrund, Zürich
14:30		FCZ summary	73' (0:1) Vega	Attendance: 10,800; Referee: (Switzerland) Serge Muhmenthaler (Grenchen)

==== Qualification table ====
Pos	Team	Pld	W	D	L	GF	GA	GD	Pts	Qualification
1	Grasshopper Club	22	12	7	3	37	15	+22	43	Advance to championship round halved points (rounded up) as bonus
2	Sion	22	11	9	2	34	14	+20	42	Advance to championship round halved points (rounded up) as bonus
3	Young Boys	22	9	7	6	37	25	+12	34	Advance to championship round halved points (rounded up) as bonus
4	Servette	22	9	7	6	38	37	+1	34	Advance to championship round halved points (rounded up) as bonus
5	Lausanne-Sport	22	9	6	7	28	27	+1	33	Advance to championship round halved points (rounded up) as bonus
6	Lugano	22	7	8	7	23	27	−4	29	Advance to championship round halved points (rounded up) as bonus
7	Luzern	22	8	5	9	26	32	−6	29	Advance to championship round halved points (rounded up) as bonus
8	Aarau	22	8	5	9	24	31	−7	29	Advance to championship round halved points (rounded up) as bonus
9	Zürich	22	6	8	8	25	22	+3	26	Continue to promotion/relegation round
10	Xamax	22	4	9	9	24	31	−7	21	Continue to promotion/relegation round
11	Yverdon-Sport	22	3	8	11	19	33	−14	17	Continue to promotion/relegation round
12	Kriens	22	3	7	12	17	38	−21	16	Continue to promotion/relegation round

Source: rsssf.com
Rules for classification: 1) Points; 2) Goal difference; 3) Goals scored; 4) Head-to-head points; 5) Away goals scored; 6) Draw.

==== Promotion/relegation group ====
20 February 1994 Round 1	Schaffhausen	0–1	Zürich	Stadion Breite, Schaffhausen
14:30	Pagno (yellow card) 49'	FCZ summary	23' (0:1) Waas	Attendance: 1,600; Referee: (Switzerland) Gottfried Friedrich (Seedorf)

27 February 1994 Round 2	Zürich	2–1	Xamax	Letzigrund, Zürich
14:30	Waas (yellow card) 17'; Di Jorio 23' (1:0); Heydecker (yellow card) 51'; Şahin 53' (2:1); Škoro (yellow card) 60'	FCZ summary	(yellow card) 22' Gottardi; (yellow card) 24' Fasel; 33' (1:1) Sutter; (yellow card) 75' (yellow-red card) 90+3' Ivanov	Attendance: 2,800; Referee: (Switzerland) Werner Müller (Obererlinsbach)

5 March 1994 Round 3	Yverdon-Sports	1–2	Zürich	Stade Municipal, Yverdon
17:30	Urošević 82' (pen. 1:2)	FCZ summary	(yellow card) 31' Şahin; (yellow card) 31' Kägi; 65' (0:1) J. Studer; 76' (0:2) Baldassari; (yellow card) 88' Blättler	Attendance: 2,100; Referee: (Switzerland) Dieter Schoch (Attiswil)

13 March 1994 Round 4	Zürich	1–1	Basel	Letzigrund, Zürich
14:30	Waas 15' (1:0); Kägi (yellow card) 51'	FCZ summary Summary	(yellow card) 42' Smajić; 70' (1:1) Zuffi	Attendance: 18,500; Referee: (Switzerland) Gottfried Friedrich (Seedorf)

20 March 1994 Round 5	Zürich	5–1	Kriens	Letzigrund, Zürich
14:30	Şahin 3' (1:0); Şahin 61' (pen.); Blättler 75' (3:1); Škoro 84' (4:1); Waas 90+2'	FCZ summary	56' (1:1) Sawu	Attendance: 1,900; Referee: (Switzerland) Karl Strässle (Steinach)

27 March 1994 Round 6	Étoile Carouge	0–0	Zürich	Stade de la Fontenette, Carouge
14:30	Aresu (yellow card)	FCZ summary	(yellow card) Hodel; (yellow card) J. Studer	Attendance: 580; Referee: (Switzerland) Hans Müller (Bern)

30 March 1994 Round 7	Zürich	1–3	St. Gallen	Letzigrund, Zürich
20:00	Şahin 3' (1:0); Şahin (yellow card) 38'	FCZ summary	9' (1:1) Gilewicz; (yellow card) 14' Koch; (yellow card) 25' Gilewicz; 46' (pen.) Gambino; 90+2' (1:3) Gilewicz	Attendance: 5,500; Referee: (Switzerland) Cornu

8 April 1994 Round 8	St. Gallen	3–0	Zürich	Espenmoos, St. Gallen
20:00	Gertschen 40' (1:0); Gertschen 52' (2:0); Gilewicz 85' (3:0); Bouderbala (yellow card)	FCZ summary	(yellow card) Ernst	Attendance: 5,700; Referee: (Switzerland) Dieter Schoch (Attiswil)
Note: FCZ head-coach Kurt Jara was dismissed by President Sven Hotz immediately after the end of the game.

16 April 1994 Round 9	Zürich	5–0	Étoile Carouge	Letzigrund, Zürich
20:00	Škoro 6' (1:0); Waas (yellow card) 34'; J. Studer 39' (2:0); Waas 60' (3:0); Şahin 69' (4:0); Widmer (yellow card) 71'; Şahin 80' (5:0)	FCZ summary	(yellow card) 24' M. Studer; (yellow card) 28' Brea; (yellow card) 60' Favre	Attendance: 1,600; Referee: (Switzerland) Freddy Philippoz (Sion)

23 April 1994 Round 10	Kriens	1–2	Zürich	Stadion Kleinfeld, Kriens
17:30	Zwyssig (yellow card) 14'; Ndlovu 17' (1:0)	FCZ summary	70' (1:1) Škoro; 75' (1:2) Şahin	Attendance: 1,800; Referee: (Liechtenstein) Roland Beck (Triesenberg)

30 April 1994 Round 11	Basel	1–1	Zürich	St. Jakob Stadium, Basel
20:00	Cantaluppi 11'	FCZ summary FCB summary	81' Škoro	Attendance: 42,125; Referee: (Switzerland) Werner Müller (Obererlinsbach)
Note: Fair game, no yellow cards

3 May 1994 Round 12	Zürich	2–0	Yverdon-Sports	Letzigrund, Zürich
20:00	Ernst 15' (1:0); Mazzarelli 30' (2:0)	FCZ summary	(yellow card) 36' Wicht; (yellow card) 82' Castro; (red card) 86' Bamba	Attendance: 1,500; Referee: (Liechtenstein) Roland Beck (Triesenberg)

7 May 1994 Round 13	Xamax	1–0	Zürich	Stade de la Maladière, Neuchâtel
20:00	Adriano 28' (1:0); Adriano (yellow card) 58'	FCZ summary	(yellow card) 32' Di Jorio; (yellow card) 62' Widmer; (yellow card) 87' (yellow-red card) 89' Şahin	Attendance: 6,400; Referee: (Switzerland) Claude Détruche (Thônex)

10 May 1994 Round 16	Zürich	2–2	Schaffhausen	Letzigrund, Zürich
20:00	Mazzarelli 74' (1:2); Ernst 84' (pen. 2:2)	FCZ summary	18' (0:1) Kopp; 68' (0:2) Guirao; (yellow card) 73' Beer	Attendance: 1,000; Referee: (Switzerland) Andreas Schluchter (Schönenbuch)

==== Final table ====
Pos	Team	Pld	W	D	L	GF	GA	GD	Pts	Qualification or relegation
1	Basel	14	7	6	1	22	7	+15	20	Promoted to NLA 1994–95
2	St. Gallen	14	8	4	2	28	14	+14	20	Promoted to NLA 1994–95
3	Xamax	14	9	2	3	21	12	+9	20	Remain in NLA 1994–95
4	Zürich	14	7	4	3	24	15	+9	18	Remain in NLA 1994–95
5	Kriens	14	4	4	6	21	20	+1	12	Relegated to NLB 1994–95
6	Étoile Carouge	14	3	5	6	14	24	−10	11	Remain in NLB 1994–95
7	FC Schaffhausen	14	2	3	9	14	31	−17	7	Remain in NLB 1994–95
8	Yverdon-Sport	14	1	2	11	8	29	−21	4	Relegated to NLB 1994–95

Source: rsssf.com

=== Swiss Cup ===
The first-tier clubs from the 1993–94 Nationalliga A were granted byes for the first two rounds and joined the competition in the third round. These teams were seeded and cound not be drawn against each other. The draw respected regionalities, when possible, and the lower classed team was granted home advantage.

18 September 1993 Round 3	Bülach	1–2	Zürich	Stadion Erachfeld, Bülach
	Oberhänsli 26' (1:0)	FCZ summary	45' (1:1) Grassi; 57' (1:2) Şahin	Attendance: 1,302; Referee: (Switzerland) Hug
Note: FC Bülach played in the 1993/1994 season in the 2. Liga (fourth-tier).

6 November 1993 Round 4	St. Gallen	0–0 (a.e.t.) (4–5 p)	Zürich	Espenmoos, St. Gallen
	Fodor (yellow card) 60'; Vernier (yellow card) 114'	FCZ summary	(yellow card) 7' Widmer; (yellow card) 42' B. Studer; (yellow card) 57' J. Studer; (yellow card) 70' Kägi; (yellow card) 109' Hodel	Attendance: 4,000; Referee: (Switzerland) Werner Müller (Obererlinsbach)
	Penalties
	Fischer (penalty missed); Gambino (penalty scored); Vernier (penalty scored); Gertschen (penalty scored); Fodor (penalty scored); Tiefenbach (penalty missed)		(penalty missed) Ernst; (penalty scored) Şahin; (penalty scored) Škoro; (penalty scored) Waas; (penalty scored) Blättler; (penalty scored) Kägi

2 March 1994 Round 5	Chênois	1–3	Zürich	Stade des Trois-Chêne, Thônex
	Tarare 29' (1:1); Rothenbühler (yellow card) 73'	FCZ summary	5' (0:1) Mazzarelli; (yellow card) 63' Škoro; 72' (1:2) Škoro; 84' (1:3) Hodel	Attendance: 750; Referee: Daniel Roduit (Sion, Switzerland)

23 March 1994 Quarter-final	Chiasso	0–1	Zürich	Stadio Comunale Riva IV, Chiasso
	Morandi (yellow card)	FCZ summary	67' (0:1) Ernst; (yellow card) Hodel; (yellow card) Blättler; (yellow card) Kägi	Attendance: 750; Referee: (Switzerland) Kurt Zuppinger (Bremgarten)

4 April 1994 Semi-final	Zürich	1–2	Grasshopper Club	Letzigrund, Zürich
	Şahin (yellow card) 58'; Şahin 65' (pen. 1:1)	FCZ summary	60' (0:1) Willems; 90' (1:2) Élber	Attendance: 13,500; Referee: (Switzerland) Serge Muhmenthaler (Grenchen)

=== Intertoto Cup ===
==== Group 6 matches ====
27 June 1993 GS1	Zürich (Switzerland)	2–0	(Denmark) Silkeborg IF	Linthstrasse, Tuggen
	Grassi 44' (pen.); Hodel 69' (2:0)	FCZ summary		Attendance: 650; Referee: (Switzerland) Willi Rudin (Liestal)

3 July 1993 GS2	Slovan Bratislava (Slovakia)	2–4	(Switzerland) Zürich	Bratislava
	Gostič 70' (1:2); Juriga 76' (2:3)	FCZ summary	7' (0:1) Waas; 48' (0:2) Şahin; (red card) 65' B. Studer; 73' (1:3) Blättler; 79' (2:4) Grassi	Attendance: 5,000; Referee: (Slovakia) Jhlring

17 July 1994 GS3	VfL Bochum (Germany)	1–1	(Switzerland) Zürich	Hattingen, North Rhine-Westphalia, Germany
	Helmig 78' (1:1)	FCZ summary	11' (0:1) Waas	Attendance: 2,500; Referee: (Germany) Hellmut Krug
Note: Match as part of the 100th anniversary celebrations of SG Welper 1893 e.V. VfL Bochum played in the 2. Bundesliga in the 1993/1994 season.

24 July 1994 GS4	Zürich (Switzerland)	0–2	(Austria) Tirol Innsbruck	Sportsplatz Rheinwiese, Schaan, Liechtenstein
		FCZ summary	23' (0:1) Václav Daněk; 78' (0:2) Westerthaler	Attendance: 1,100; Referee: (Switzerland) Michel Zen-Ruffinen
Note: Despite the defeat, FCZ is the winner of the Intertoto Group 6 (thanks to a better goal difference than Slovan Bratislava) and thus wins the prize money of 60,000 DM.

==== Group table ====
Pos	Team	Pld	W	D	L	GF	GA	GD	Pts
1	(Switzerland) Zürich	4	2	1	1	7	5	+2	5
2	(Slovakia) Slovan Bratislava	4	2	1	1	8	8	0	5
3	(Austria) Tirol Innsbruck	4	1	2	1	5	4	+1	4
4	(Germany) VfL Bochum	4	1	2	1	5	5	0	4
5	(Denmark) Silkeborg IF	4	0	2	2	4	7	−3	2

Source: Pawel Mogielnicki's Page

=== Friendly matches ===
==== Pre-season ====
8 July 1993 Uhrencup semi-final	Zürich	1–1 (4–3 p)	SR Delémont	Stadion Brühl, Grenchen
	Grassi 27' (1:0)	FCZ summary	30' (1:1) Renzi	Referee: (Switzerland) Reto Tollot
	Penalties
	Penalty scored		Penalty missed Penalty scored

10 July 1993 Uhrencup final	Basel	4–5	Zürich	Stadion Brühl, Grenchen
19:00	Karrer (yellow card) 7'; Hertig 12' (1:1); Berg 22' (2:1); Smajić 72' (pen. 3:2); Palumbo 86' (4:5)	FCZ summary FCB summary	2' (0:1) Blättler; (yellow card) 16' Şahin; 28' (pen.2:2) Blättler; 76' (o.g. 3:3) (Meier); 79' (3:4) Blättler; 82' (3:5) J. Studer	Attendance: 1,250; Referee: (Switzerland) Kurt Zuppinger (Bremgarten)
Note: The Uhrencup was a club tournament, that was held annually in Grenchen.

22 Augist 1993 Exhibition game Mid-season	Zürich	4–2	VfB Stuttgart	Hofstattmatten, Suhr, Aargau
	Di Jorio 58' (1:1); Di Jorio 63' (2:1); Rildon 74' (3:1); Di Jorio 77' (4:2)	FCZ summary	2' (0:1) Knup; 76' (3:2) Walter; (yellow card) 86' Schwab	Attendance: 1,000; Referee: (Switzerland) Kurt Röthlisberger (Suhr, Aargau)
Note: Match as part of FC Suhr's 50th anniversary celebrations. FCZ were reinforced with players from their farm-team FC Baden (Casamento, Disler, Filipović, Hedinger, Makalakalane, Patusi, Sesa, Stoop, Zubko) as well as trialists Jozić (Cesena), Jones (Crystal Palace), Milovanović (Dynamo Dresden) and Brazilian Rildon.

2 November 1993 Exhibition game Mid-season	Stuttgarter Kickers	3–1	Zürich	Stuttgart
	Dundee 1' (1:0); Koch 2' (2:0); Aschenbrenner (3:0)	FCZ summary	Goal

==== Winter break ====
22 January 1994 Exhibition game	Zürich	6–1	Baden
	5x Di Jorio	FCZ summary	Goal	Referee: (Switzerland)

5 February 1994 Exhibition game	Luzern	1–1	Zürich	Unterallmend, Root, Switzerland
	Koch 54' (1:0)	FCZ summary	76' (1:1) Şahin	Attendance: 1,000; Referee: (Switzerland) Walter Kronig

12 February 1994 Exhibition game	Grenchen	3–5	Zürich	Stadion Brühl, Grenchen
	Przybylo 24' (1:2); Lanz 29' (2:2); Przybylo 41' (3:3)	FCZ summary	12' (0:1) Waas; 13' (0:2) Waas; 33' (2:3) Škoro; 70' (3:4) Mazzarelli; 82' (3:5) Blättler	Attendance: 150; Referee: (Switzerland) Dieter Schoch (Attiswil)

13 February 1994 Exhibition game	Winterthur	0–5	Zürich	Schützenwiese, Winterthur
		FCZ summary	7' (0:1) Škoro; 25' (pen.) Şahin; 42' (0:3) Škoro; 55' (0:4) Şahin; 88' (0:5) Şahin
Note: Winterthur without seven injured regular players.

12 April 1994 Exhibition game Mid-season	FC Rapperswil-Jona	0–3	Zürich	Lido, Rapperswil-Jona
		FCZ summary	50' (0:1) Di Jorio; 75' (0:2) Mazzarelli; 88' (0:3) Tarone	Attendance: 600; Referee: (Switzerland) Marcel Vollenweider (Rüti and Wald)
Note: Rapperswil-Jona played in the 2. Liga in 1993/94 (fourth-tier). FC Zürich's first match after the dismissal of coach Kurt Jara. Manager Raimondo Ponte coached the team from the sidelines. New coach Bob Houghton was present as a spectator (because he was lacking his work permit).

== Sources ==
- dbFCZ Homepage
- Switzerland 1993–94 at RSSSF

Preceded by 1992–93	FC Zürich seasons	Succeeded by 1994–95
