= 1992–93 FC Zürich season =

FC Zürich
1992–93 season
- Owner: Sven Hotz
- Chairman: Sven Hotz
- Head-coach: Kurt Jara
- Stadium: Letzigrund
- Qualification: 6th of 12
- Championship group: 5th of 8
- 1992–93 Swiss Cup: Quarter-finals
- Top goalscorer: League: Marco Grassi (9); All: Marco Grassi (13)

The 1992–93 season was FC Zürich's 96th season in their existence, since their foundation in 1896. It was their third season in the top flight of Swiss football, following their promotion at the end of 1989–90 season.

== Overview ==
Since the AGM in 1986 the local businessman Sven Hotz was the club's chairman and patron. Kurt Jara Had taken over as head-coach in October of the previous year and he continued in that position for this season. The FCZ first team competed in this years domestic first-tier 1992–93 Nationalliga A with the clear intention of retaining their top level status. The team also competed in 1992–93 Swiss Cup. They had not qualified for any of the UEFA European tournaments and they did not enter the Intertoto Cup. FCZ played their home games in the Letzigrund and the stadium is located in the west of Zurich in the district of Altstetten, which is about three kilometers from the city center.

== Players ==
The following is the list of the FCZ first team squad this season. It also includes players that were in the squad the day the domestic league season started, on 18 July 1992, but subsequently left the club after that date.

Note: Flags indicate national team as defined under FIFA eligibility rules; some limited exceptions apply. Players may hold more than one non-FIFA nationality.

No.	Pos.	Nation	Player
—	GK	SUI	Patrick Mäder (league games: 36)
—	DF	YUG	Mirsad Baljić (league games: 18)
—	DF	SUI	Alexander Germann (league games: 22)
—	DF	SUI	Marcel Hotz (league games: 26)
—	DF	SUI	Urs Isler (league games: 16)
—	DF	SUI	Giuseppe Mazzarelli (league games: 32)
—	MF	BRA	Luiz Milton (league games: 32)
—	DF	SUI	Umberto Romano (on loan to Wettingen)
—	DF	SUI	Beat Studer (league games: 31)
—	DF	SUI	Roland Widmer (league games: 19)
—	MF	ITA	Roberto Baldassarri (league games: 25)

No.	Pos.	Nation	Player
—	MF	SUI	Matthias Bärlocher (league games: 9)
—	MF	ITA	Mario Casamento (league games: 14)
—	MF	SUI	Francesco Di Jorio (on loan to Wettingen)
—	MF	SUI	Ralph Heydecker (league games: 34)
—	MF	SUI	Mario Kägi (league games: 24)
—	MF	RSA	August Makalakalane (league games: 22)
—	MF	SUI	Michael Mazenauer (league games: 24)
—	FW	SUI	Marco Grassi (league games: 30)
—	FW	SUI	David Sesa (league games: 19)
—	FW	YUG	Haris Škoro (league games: 31)
—	FW	GER	Herbert Waas (league games: 19)

Players who left the squad

The following is the list of the FCZ first team players that left the squad during the previous season or in the off-season, before the new domestic season began.

Note: Flags indicate national team as defined under FIFA eligibility rules; some limited exceptions apply. Players may hold more than one non-FIFA nationality.

No.	Pos.	Nation	Player
—	GK	SUI	Roberto Böckli (to Grasshopper Club)
—	GK	SUI	Urs Suter (to Wettingen)
—	DF	SUI	Peter Beer (to Chiasso)
—	DF	SUI	Vincent Fournier (retired)
—	DF	SUI	Christoph Gilli (to Luzern)
—	DF	ARG	Víctor Sotomayor (to Vélez Sarsfield)

No.	Pos.	Nation	Player
—	MF	ITA	Roberto Di Matteo (to Aarau)
—	MF	SUI	Roberto Fregno (to Luzern)
—	MF	SUI	Daniele Moro (to Chiasso)
—	FW	NED	Robert Kok (to Basel)
—	FW	COL	John Jairo Tréllez (to Atlético Nacional)

== Results ==
Legend

Win Draw Loss Postponed

=== Nationalliga A ===
==== Qualification phase ====
18 July 1992 Round 1	Young Boys	4–1	Zürich	Wankdorf Stadium, Bern
20:00	Bregy 7' (1:0); Kunz 26' (2:0); Bregy 60' (3:0); Moser 82' (4:0)	FCZ summary YB summary	(yellow card) 8' (yellow-red card) 35' Kägi; (yellow card) 51' Grassi; (yellow card) 58' Baljić; 84' (4:1) Baljić	Attendance: 5,100; Referee: (Switzerland) Willy Hänni, (Cugy)

22 July 1992 Round 2	Zürich	0–1	Sion	Letzigrund, Zürich
20:00	Škoro (yellow card) 35'	FCZ summary	(yellow card) 31' Rey; (yellow card) 44' Quentin; (yellow card) 58' Biaggi; 80' (0:1) Hottiger	Attendance: 4,700; Referee: (Switzerland) Gottfried Friedrich (Seedorf)

25 July 1992 Round 3	St. Gallen	1–1	Zürich	Espenmoos, St. Gallen
20:00	Thüler 13' (1:0); Irizik (yellow card) 67'; Wyss (yellow card) 82'	FCZ summary	(yellow card) 15' Milton; (yellow card) 64' B. Studer; 80' (1:1) Mazzarelli	Attendance: 6,000; Referee: (Switzerland) Kurt Zuppinger (Bremgarten)

31 July 1992 Round 4	Zürich	0–2	Chiasso	Letzigrund, Zürich
20:00	Germann (yellow card) 34'	FCZ summary	34' (0:1) Şahin; 52' (0:2) Şahin	Attendance: 2,400; Referee: (Switzerland) Claude Détruche (Thônex)

8 August 1992 Round 5	FC Bulle	1–0	Zürich	Stade de Bouleyres, Bulle
20:00	Eberhard 41' (1:0); Magnin 70' (2:0); Hartmann (penalty missed) 90+1′	FCZ summary	(yellow card) 27' Grassi; (yellow card) 76' Sesa; (yellow card) 85' Mazzarelli; 87' (2:1) Škoro	Attendance: 2,200; Referee: (Switzerland) Freddy Philippoz (Sion)
Note: FCZ goalie Patrick Mäder held the penalty kick taken by Hartmann.

11 August 1992 Round 6	Zürich	0–0	Grasshopper Club	Letzigrund, Zürich
20:00	Škoro (yellow card) 55'	FCZ summary	(yellow card) 42' de Vicente	Attendance: 8,100; Referee: (Switzerland) Werner Müller (Obererlinsbach)

18 August 1992 Round 7	Aarau	1–1	Zürich	Stadion Brügglifeld, Aarau
20:00	Fluri (yellow card) 47'; Sutter 83' (1:1)	FCZ summary FCA summary	(yellow card) 63' Baljić; (yellow card) 65' Mazzarelli; 66' (0:1) Baljić; (yellow card) 70' Kägi	Attendance: 5,900; Referee: (Switzerland) Strässle (Steinach)

22 August 1992 Round 8	Zürich	0–0	Xamax	Letzigrund, Zürich
20:00	Germann (yellow card) 26'; Škoro (yellow card) 39'	FCZ summary		Attendance: 3,900; Referee: (Switzerland) Arturo Martino (Neukirch an der Thur)

29 August 1992 Round 9	Lausanne-Sport	3–2	Zürich	Olympique de la Pontaise, Lausanne
20:00	Fink 24' (1:0); Badea 54' (2:1); J. Studer (yellow card) 65'; Fink 90+3' (3:2)	FCZ summary	(yellow card) 15' Kägi; 48' (1:1) Kägi; (yellow card) 51' B. Studer; (yellow card) 54' Baldassarri; 85' (2:2) Grassi; (yellow card) 86' Milton	Attendance: 4,900; Referee: (Switzerland) Werner Müller (Obererlinsbach)

2 September 1992 Round 10	Zürich	2–1	Lugano	Letzigrund, Zürich
20:00	Milton 2' (1:0); Kägi 64' (2:1); Kägi (yellow card); Baljić (yellow card)	FCZ summary	25' (1:1) Subiat	Attendance: 3,700; Referee: (Switzerland) Freddy Philippoz (Sion)

12 September 1992 Round 11	Servette	0–1	Zürich	Charmilles Stadium, Geneva
20:00		FCZ summary	51' (0:1) Mazenauer; (yellow card) 53' Mazzarelli; (yellow card) 56' Germann; (yellow card) 83' Heydecker	Attendance: 6,600; Referee: (Switzerland) Urs Meier (Würenlos)

19 September 1992 Round 12	Zürich	2–1	Young Boys	Letzigrund, Zürich
20:00	Kägi 45' (1:0) (Baumann) 76' (o.g.)	FCZ summary	87' (2:1) Meier	Attendance: 4.200; Referee: (Switzerland) Andreas Schluchter (Schönenbuch)

26 September 1992 Round 13	Sion	0–0	Zürich	Stade Tourbillon, Sion
20:00	Piffaretti (yellow card) 14'; Herr (yellow card) 44'; Quentin (yellow card) 53'	FCZ summary	(red card) 6' Škoro; (yellow card) 14' Mäder; (yellow card) 76'Grassi	Attendance: 8,000; Referee: (Switzerland) Serge Muhmenthaler (Grenchen)

7 October 1992 Round 14	Zürich	0–1	St. Gallen	Letzigrund, Zürich
20:00	Fischer (red card) 14'; Grassi (yellow card) 36'; Mazzarelli (yellow card) 37'; Germann (yellow card) 76'; B. Studer (yellow card) 86'	FCZ summary	57' (0:1) Hurtado	Attendance: 4,500; Referee: (Switzerland) Gottfried Friedrich (Seedorf)

17 October 1992 Round 15	Chiasso	0–1	Zürich	Stadio Riva Quarto, Chiasso
20:00	Fargeon (yellow card) 54'	FCZ summary	81' (0:1) Kägi	Attendance: 1,000; Referee: (Switzerland) Kurt Röthlisberger (Suhr, Aargau)

24 October 1992 Round 16	Zürich	2–0	Bulle	Letzigrund, Zürich
20:00	Milton 57' (1:0); Kägi (yellow card) 58'; Waas 67' (pen.)	FCZ summary	(yellow card) 31' Hartmann; (yellow card) 40' Corminboeuf	Attendance: 2,000; Referee: (Switzerland) Kurt Röthlisberger (Suhr, Aargau)

1 November 1992 Round 17	Grasshopper Club	3–1	Zürich	Hardturm, Zürich
17:30	Élber 63' (1:1); Bickel 90' (2:1); Élber 90+2' (3:1)	FCZ summary	48' (0:1) Waas	Attendance: 8,200; Referee: (Switzerland) Arturo Martino (Neukirch an der Thur)

8 November 1992 Round 18	Zürich	2–0	Aarau	Letzigrund, Zürich
14:30	Sesa (yellow card) 4'; Grassi 47' (1:0); Sesa 90+2'	FCZ summary FCA summary	(yellow card) 16' Rupf; (yellow card) 52' Di Matteo; (yellow card) 90+1' Pavličević	Attendance: 5,300; Referee: (Switzerland) Daniel Roduit (Sion)

14 November 1992 Round 19	Xamax	1–1	Zürich	Stade de la Maladière, Neuchâtel
17:30	Sutter 48' (1:0)	FCZ summary	89' (1:1) Germann	Attendance: 7,600; Referee: (Switzerland) Kurt Röthlisberger (Suhr, Aargau)

22 November 1992 Round 20	Zürich	1–0	Lausanne-Sport	Letzigrund, Zürich
14:30	Grassi 52' (1:0); Hotz (yellow card) 78'	FCZ summary	(yellow card) 48' Raschle	Attendance: 3,700; Referee: (Switzerland) Serge Muhmenthaler (Grenchen)

29 November 1992 Round 21	Lugano	0–1	Zürich	Cornaredo, Lugano
14:30	Galvao (yellow card) 33'; Käslin (yellow card) 87'	FCZ summary	(yellow card) 13' B. Studer; 52' (0:1) Waas	Attendance: 4,900; Referee: (Switzerland) Kurt Röthlisberger (Suhr, Aargau)

6 December 1992 Round 22	Zürich	1–1	Servette	Letzigrund, Zürich
14:30	Grassi 71' (1:0)	FCZ summary	(yellow card) 28' Rey; (yellow card) 67' Anderson; 73' (1:1) Sinval	Attendance: 7,100; Referee: (Switzerland) Werner Müller (Obererlinsbach)

==== Qualification table ====
Pos	Team	Pld	W	D	L	GF	GA	GD	Pts	Qualification
1	Young Boys	22	11	6	5	44	30	+14	28	Advance to championship round halved points (rounded up) as bonus
2	Servette	22	10	7	5	32	18	+14	27	Advance to championship round halved points (rounded up) as bonus
3	Sion	22	8	10	4	28	21	+7	26	Advance to championship round halved points (rounded up) as bonus
4	Lausanne-Sport	22	7	10	5	28	21	+7	24	Advance to championship round halved points (rounded up) as bonus
5	Aarau	22	9	6	7	30	34	−4	24	Advance to championship round halved points (rounded up) as bonus
6	Zürich	22	8	7	7	21	22	−1	23	Advance to championship round halved points (rounded up) as bonus
7	Xamax	22	6	10	6	30	26	+4	22	Advance to championship round halved points (rounded up) as bonus
8	Lugano	22	7	8	7	29	28	+1	22	Advance to championship round halved points (rounded up) as bonus
9	Grasshopper Club	22	5	11	6	27	27	0	21	Continue to promotion/relegation round
10	St. Gallen	22	4	10	8	21	28	−7	18	Continue to promotion/relegation round
11	Chiasso	22	5	6	11	15	26	−11	16	Continue to promotion/relegation round
12	Bulle	22	4	5	13	18	42	−24	13	Continue to promotion/relegation round

Source: rsssf.com
Rules for classification: 1) Points; 2) Goal difference; 3) Goals scored; 4) Head-to-head points; 5) Away goals scored; 6) Draw.

==== Championship group ====
The first eight teams of the qualification phase competed in the Championship round. The teams took half of the points (rounded up to complete units) gained in the qualification as bonus with them. The championship group began on 28 February 1993 and was completed on 12 June.

28 February 1993 Round 1	Lugano	2–0	Zürich	Cornaredo, Lugano
14:30	Sylvestre 22' (1:0); Käslin (yellow card) 64'; Pelosi 87' (2:0)	FCZ summary	(yellow card) 24' (yellow-red card) 68' Kägi; (yellow card) 55' Grassi; (yellow card) 74' Widmer	Attendance: 3,000; Referee: (Switzerland) Daniel Roduit (Sion)
Note: "A match played under the most adverse weather conditions" (NZZ).

6 March 1993 Round 2	Zürich	0–0	Young Boys	Letzigrund, Zürich
17:00		FCZ summary		Attendance: 1,500; Referee: (Switzerland) Kurt Röthlisberger (Suhr, Aargau)

14 March 1993 Round 3	Servette	0–2	Zürich	Charmilles Stadium, Geneva
14:30	Ohrel (yellow card) 73'	FCZ summary	26' (0:1) B. Studer; (yellow card) 41' Kägi; (yellow card) 42' Milton; 88' (0:2) Grassi	Attendance: 4,200; Referee: (Switzerland) Karl Strässle (Steinach)

24 March 1993 Round 4	Zürich	0–0	Sion	Letzigrund, Zürich
20:00	Grassi (yellow card) 25'	FCZ summary	(yellow card) 61' Piffaretti	Attendance: 2,800; Referee: (Switzerland) Karl Strässle (Steinach)

3 April 1993 Round 5	Xamax	3–0	Zürich	Stade de la Maladière, Neuchâtel
20:00	Bonvin 53' (1:0); Rothenbühler 63' (2:0); Sutter 69' (3:0)	FCZ summary	(yellow card) 43' B. Studer; (yellow card) 75' Widmer	Attendance: 5,500; Referee: (Switzerland) Kurt Röthlisberger (Suhr, Aargau)

10 April 1993 Round 6	Zürich	2–1	Lausanne-Sport	Letzigrund, Zürich
20:00	Kägi 23' (1:0); Mazzarelli (yellow card) 43'; Kägi 60' (2:0); Waas (yellow card) 73'	FCZ summary	1' (0:1) Vernaz; (yellow card) 35' Londono	Attendance: 3,100; Referee: (Switzerland) Claude Détruche (Thônex)
Note: Vernaz scored for Lausanne after 22 seconds.

24 April 1993 Round 7	Zürich	0–0	Aarau	Letzigrund, Zürich
20:00	Widmer (yellow card) 15'	FCZ summary FCA summary	(yellow card) 26' Bader; (yellow card) 31' Heldmann; (yellow card) 42' Di Matteo; (yellow card) 65' Wassmer	Attendance: 7,200; Referee: (Switzerland) Manfred Schlup, (Grenchen)

8 May 1993 Round 8	Aarau	1–0	Zürich	Stadion Brügglifeld, Aarau
20:00	Romano (yellow card) 52'; Komornicki (yellow card) 88'; Heldmann 90' (1:0)	FCZ summary FCA summary	(yellow card) 35' B. Studer; (yellow card) 50' Grassi; (yellow card) 88' Germann	Attendance: 3,500; Referee: (Switzerland) Manfred Schlup, (Grenchen)

15 May 1993 Round 9	Lausanne-Sport	2–0	Zürich	Olympique de la Pontaise, Lausanne
20:00	Badea (yellow card) 65'; J. Studer 67' (1:0); Fink 74' (2:0)	FCZ summary	(yellow card) 59' Mazenauer	Attendance: 3,900; Referee: (Switzerland) Daniel Roduit (Sion)

22 May 1993 Round 10	Zürich	2–0	Xamax	Letzigrund, Zürich
20:00	Škoro (yellow card) 14'; Škoro 46' (1:0); Škoro 51' (pen.)	FCZ summary	(yellow card) 2' Fernandez; (yellow card) 86' Fasel	Attendance: 2,000; Referee: (Switzerland) Karl Strässle (Steinach)

25 May 1993 Round 11	Sion	1–4	Zürich	Stade Tourbillon, Sion
20:00	Assis 49' (1:3)	FCZ summary	6' (0:1) Škoro; 12' (0:2) Grassi; 42' (0:3) Waas; (yellow card) 49' Mazzarelli; 88' (1:4) Grassi	Attendance: 4,000; Referee: (Switzerland) Urs Meier (Würenlos)

5 June 1993 Round 12	Zürich	3–2	Servette	Letzigrund, Zürich
20:00	Grassi 44' (1:1); Waas 56' (2:1); Grassi 75' (pen.); Mäder (yellow card)	FCZ summary	15' (0:1) Renato; (yellow card) 59' Renato; 79' (3:2) Gertschen	Attendance: 8,500; Referee: (Switzerland) Serge Muhmenthaler (Grenchen)
Note: The FC Aarau team, who had already won 2-1 against Sion during the afternoon, watched the game live at Letzigrund and afterwards celebrated their now confirmed championship title in front of the south stand.

9 June 1993 Round 13	Young Boys	0–0	Zürich	Wankdorf Stadium, Bern
20:00	Widmer (yellow card) 10'	FCZ summary	(yellow card) 11' Rotzetter	Attendance: 6,300; Referee: (Switzerland) Kurt Röthlisberger (Suhr, Aargau)

12 June 1993 Round 14	Zürich	0–2	Lugano	Letzigrund, Zürich
20:00	Morf (yellow card) 42'; Andrioli (yellow card) 49'	FCZ summary	16' (0:1) Pelosi; (yellow card) 61' Grassi; 68' (0:2) Colombo	Attendance: 5,400; Referee: (Switzerland) Daniel Roduit (Sion)

==== Final league table ====
Pos	Team	Pld	W	D	L	GF	GA	GD	BP	Pts	Qualification
1	Aarau	14	9	4	1	21	7	+14	12	34	Swiss champions, qualified for 1993–94 UEFA Champions League preliminary round and entered 1993 Intertoto Cup
2	Young Boys	14	5	4	5	15	15	0	14	28	Qualified for 1993–94 UEFA Cup and entered 1993 Intertoto Cup
3	Servette	14	5	3	6	16	19	−3	14	27	Qualified for 1993–94 UEFA Cup
4	Lugano	14	7	2	5	21	14	+7	11	27	Swiss Cup winners, qualified for 1993–94 UEFA Cup Winners' Cup
5	Zürich	14	5	4	5	13	14	−1	12	26	Entered 1993 Intertoto Cup
6	Sion	14	4	3	7	17	22	−5	13	24	
7	Xamax	14	4	5	5	16	16	0	11	24	
8	Lausanne-Sport	14	3	3	8	11	23	−12	12	21	Entered 1993 Intertoto Cup

Source: rsssf.com
Rules for classification: 1) points; 2) Position in the qualification.

=== Swiss Cup ===
The 12 clubs from the Nationalliga A were granted byes for the first two rounds and they joined the competition in round 3.

4 October 1992 Round 3	FC Arbon	0–3	Zürich	Stacherholz, Arbon
		FCZ summary	24' (0:1) Makalakalane; 36' (0:2) Heydecker; 41' (0:3) Casamento; (yellow card) 85' Makalakalane	Attendance: 1,200; Referee: (Liechtenstein) Roland Beck (Triesenberg)

20 March 1993 Round 4	Mendrisio	0–3	Zürich	Centro Sportivo Comunale, Mendrisio
14:45	Fontana (yellow card) 39'	FCZ summary	50' (pen.) Grassi; 82' (0:2) Sesa; 89' (0:3) Sesa	Attendance: 800; Referee: (Switzerland) Jürg Herrmann (Hinterkapplen (Wohlen bei Bern))

6 April 1993 Round 5	FC Schaffhausen	0–5	Zürich	Stadion Breite, Schaffhausen
		FCZ summary	9' (0:1) Grassi; 33' (0:2) Waas; 37' (0:3) Baldassari; 63' (0:4) Škoro; 74' (0:5) Grassi; (penalty missed) 83′ Sesa	Attendance: 2,059; Referee: (Switzerland) Michel Zen Ruffinen
Note: 83rd minute: Sesa hits the post with the penalty kick and the ball was then cleared.

20 April 1993 Quarter-final	Lugano	4–2	Zürich	Cornaredo, Lugano
	Subiat 26' (1:1); Jensen 54' (2:1); Sylvestre 74' (3:2); Penzavalli 85' (4:2)	FCZ summary	7' (0:1) Studer; 57' (2:2) Grassi	Attendance: 3,500; Referee: (Switzerland) Gottfried Friedrich (Seedorf, Uri)

=== Friendly matches ===
==== Pre-season ====
20 June 1992 Exhibition game	FC Vils	0–6	Zürich	Vils, Austria
		FCZ summary	Goal

21 Jume 1992 Exhibition game	SV Krün	3–17	Zürich	Krün, Germany
	Goal	FCZ summary	Goal

27 June 1992 Exhibition game	Wacker Innsbruck	2–2	Zürich	Wörgl, Austria
	Goal	FCZ summary	Škoro; Baldassari

2 July 1992 Uhrencup semi-final	Basel	1–6	Zürich	Stadion Brühl, Grenchen
19:30	Jeitziner (yellow card) 40'; Sitek 49' (1:3); Jeitziner (penalty missed) 90′	FCZ summary FCB summary	14' (0:1) Škoro; 24' (0:2) Škoro; 29' (0:3) Baljić; (yellow card) 61' Germann; 67' (1:4) Baljić; 74' (1:5) Kägi; 86' (1:6) Kägi	Attendance: 600; Referee: (Switzerland) Dieter Schoch (Attiswil)
Note: For various reasons, the players Baumgartner, Karrer, Marcolli, Micha Rahmen, Wagner, Walther and Zbinden were missing from the FCB squad, as were Casamento, Grassi and Milton from the FCZ squad. 90th minute: Mäder held the penalty-kick from Jeitziner.

4 July 1992 Uhrencup final	Zürich	2–0	SR Delémont	Stadion Brühl, Grenchen
	Grassi 21' (1:0); Baljić 73' (2:0)	FCZ summary	(yellow card) 63' Bonato; (yellow card) 68' Renzi	Attendance: 800; Referee: (Switzerland) Jürg Herrmann (Hinterkapplen)

7 July 1992 Exhibition game	Aarau	5–0	Zürich	Sportplatz Breite, Erlinsbach, Solothurn
	Aleksandrov 7' (1:0); Heldmann 20' (2:0); Aleksandrov 30' (3:0); Wassmer 35' (4:0); Heldmann 85' (5:0)	FCZ summary		Attendance: 1,250; Referee: (Switzerland) Werner Müller (Obererlinsbach)

10 July 1992 Exhibition game	Zürich	6–0	La Chaux-de-Fonds	Lyss
	Škoro 8' (1:0); Bärlocher 16' (2:0); Tzionas 32' (3:0); Sesa 47' (4:0); B. Studer 50' (5:0); Bärlocher 64' (6:0)	FCZ summary
Note: Semi-final of the tournament in Lyss. A youth team from FCZ played in the final against Bulle on July 11, 1992, and lost 0-2.

11 July 1992 Exhibition game	Zürich	2–6	Borussia Dortmund	Stadion Kleinfeld, Kriens
	Baljić 3' (1:0); Germann 34' (2:4)	FCZ summary	5' (1:1) Poschner; 15' (1:2) Chapuisat; 25' (1:3) Reinhardt; 28' (1:4) Chapuisat; 78' (2:5) Mill; 87' (2:6) Wegmann	Attendance: 3,000; Referee: (Switzerland) Urs Meier (Würenlos)
Note: Semi-final as part of the 9th tournament in Kriens.

14 July 1992 Exhibition game	Kriens	0–4	Zürich	Stadion Kleinfeld, Kriens
		FCZ summary	24' (0:1) Baljić; 51' (0:2) Sesa; 75' (0:3) Baljić; 80' (0:4) Baljić	Referee: (Switzerland) Meyer
Note: Match for 3rd place as part of the 9th tournament in Kriens

23 September 1992 Exhibition game	Zürich	0–2	Italy (national team)	Letzigrund, Zürich
		FCZ summary	40' (0:1) Bianchi; 45' (0:2) Vialli	Attendance: 14,300; Referee: (Switzerland) Arturo Martino (Neukirch an der Thur)

==== Winter break ====
19 January 1993 Exhibition game	Winterthur	2–6	Zürich	Schützenwiese, Winterthur
	Ramsauer 73' (1:5); Brogno 85' (2:6)	FCZ summary	7' (0:1) Baljić; 25' (0:2) Škoro; 30' (0:3) Waas; 32' (0:4) Mazenauer; 55' (0:5) Bärlocher; 82' (1:6) Sesa

23 January 1993 Exhibition game	Luzern	3–0	Zürich	Buchrain
	Güntensperger (1:0); Güntensperger (2:0); Gerstenmájer (3:0)	FCZ summary

29 January 1993 Exhibition game	Karlsruher SC	3–1	Zürich	Karlsruhe
	Kirjakov 23' (1:0); Carl 81' (2:1); Bender 85' (pen.)	FCZ summary	69' (1:1) Sesa

31 January 1993 Exhibition game	SC Freiburg	4–0	Zürich	Steinen, Baden-Württemberg
	Rraklli 21' (1:0); Braun 65' (2:0); Freund 87' (3:0); Heidenreich 90' (4:0)	FCZ summary

5 February 1993 Exhibition game	Los Angeles selection	1–5	Zürich	Los Angeles
	Goal	FCZ summary	(0:1) Baldassari (0:2) Baldassari (0:3) Grassi (0:4) Grassi (0:5) Škoro

8 February 1993 Exhibition game	LRI Malév SC (Hungary)	0–3	Zürich	Los Angeles
		FCZ summary	(0:1) Kägi (0:2) Sesa (0:3) Škoro

9 February 1993 Exhibition game	United States (national team)	2–1	Zürich	Trabuco Hills High School Stadium, Mission Viejo, California
	Henderson 86' (1:1); Jones 90' (2:1)	FCZ summary	31' (0:1) Baljić	Attendance: 5,327

12 February 1993 Exhibition game	San Diego Surf SC	1–2	Zürich	San Diego
	Goal	FCZ summary	(0:1) Grassi (0:2) Mazenauer	Attendance: Exhibition game

17 February 1993 Exhibition game	Basel	0–0	Zürich	St. Jakob Stadium, Basel
20:00		FCZ summary Summary	(yellow card) 37' Kägi; (penalty missed) 87′ Waas	Attendance: 736; Referee: (Switzerland) Kurt Röthlisberger (Suhr)

21 February 1993 Exhibition game	Aarau	2–1	Zürich	Stadion Brügglifeld, Aarau
	Aleksandrov 71' (1:1); Meier 87' (2:1)	FCZ summary	44' (0:1) Škoro	Attendance: 800

== Sources ==
- dbFCZ Homepage
- Switzerland 1992–93 at RSSSF

Preceded by 1991–92	FC Zürich seasons	Succeeded by 1993–94
