= 1993–94 Swiss Cup =

Tournament details
- Country: Switzerland

Final positions
- Champions: Grasshoppers
- Runners-up: FC Schaffhausen

The 1993–94 Swiss Cup was the 69th season of Switzerland's football cup competition organised annually by the Swiss Football Association. It began on 28 August with the first games of Round 1 and ended on Sunday 15 May 1994 with the Final held at Wankdorf, Bern. The winners earned a place in the first round of the Cup Winners' Cup.

== Overview ==
The competition began on the week-end of 28–29 August 1993 with the games of the first round and ended on Sunday 15 May 1994 with the final held at the former Wankdorf Stadium in Bern. The 20 clubs from the reduced in size Nationalliga B were granted byes for the first round. The 12 clubs from the Nationalliga A were granted byes for the first two rounds. The winners of the cup qualified themselves for the first round of the Cup Winners' Cup in the next season.

The draw was respecting regionalities, when possible, and the lower classed team was granted home advantage. In the entire competition, the matches were played in a single knockout format. In the event of a draw after 90 minutes, the match went into extra time. In the event of a draw at the end of extra time, a penalty shoot-out was to decide which team qualified for the next round. No replays were foreseen.

== Round 1 ==
In the first round a total of 167 clubs participated from the third-tier and lower. Reserve teams were not admitted to the competition.

Team 1	Score	Team 2
28–29 August 1993
FC Orbe	1–2	Montreux-Sports
Baulmes	1–3 (a.e.t.)	Echallens
FC Hermance	0–6	Signal FC (Bernex)
FC Pfyn	0–8	Chur
Veyrier-Sports	3–7	FC Saint-Jean GE
FC Wädenswil	1–3	Tuggen
FC Sierre	1–10	FC Fully
FC Aigle	5–0	FC Bramois
FC Amriswil	0–2	FC Altstätten (St. Gallen)
FC Bodio	0–3	FC Ascona
FC Cornaux	1–5	FC Le Locle
Dornach	1–2	FC Klus-Balsthal
FC Frenkendorf	3–1	FC Trimbach
FC Grimisuat	1–3	Martigny-Sports
FC Industrie (Zürich)	2–6	SC Veltheim (Winterthur)
FC Rapid Ostermundigen	0–2	Thun
Biel-Bienne	2–2 (a.e.t.) (8–7 p)	Moutier
FC La Tour-de-Trême	1–2	FC Châtel-St-Denis
FC Chêne-Aubonne	1–0	Vevey Sports
FC Emmen	2–3	Buochs
FC Luterbach	2–5	FC Riehen
SC Menzingen	1–1 (a.e.t.) (0–3 p)	SC Zug
FC Seon	0–2	FC Brunnen
FC Stade Payerne	1–6	Colombier
SC Steinhausen	1–10	Emmenbrücke
Wohlen	2–3	FC Kölliken
FC Subingen	3–1	Wangen bei Olten
US Morobbia-Giubiasco	0–4	FC Tresa
FC Superga (La Chaux-de-Fonds)	0–5	La Chaux-de-Fonds
FC Wallisellen	1–5	Red Star
FC Bern	1–2	Bümpliz
FC Reinach (BL)	1–2 (a.e.t.)	FC Pratteln
FC Rheinfelden	4–2 (a.e.t.)	FC Allschwil
FC Schwammendingen	0–6	FC Altstetten (Zürich)
SV Seebach (ZH)	1–0	FC Wiedikon
FC Töss (Winterthur)	1–3	FC Brüttisellen
FC Volketswil	5–0	FC Dietikon
Kickers Luzern	2–2 (a.e.t.) (6–5 p)	FC Muri (AG)
FC Münchwilen	0–1	FC Fortuna (SG)
FC Post Bern	1–5	FC Wyler Bern
FC Spiez	1–2 (a.e.t.)	FC Dürrenast
SC Worb	0–1	SV Lyss
FC Lenzburg	0–2	FC Suhr
FC Trübbach	3–4	FC Winkeln St.Gallen
FC Flurlingen	2–3	Bülach
FC Ins	0–5	FC Lerchenfeld (Thun)
FC Azzurri Bienne	0–4	Burgdorf
FC Embrach	2–3	FC Fehraltorf
Muttenz	1–1 (a.e.t.) (6–5 p)	Laufen
FC Trinacria Le Locle	2–5	FC Boudry
FC Murten	1–2	Serrières
FC Wängi	2–5	Frauenfeld
FC Bottens	1–3	FC Assens
SC Derendigen	0–2	Solothurn
FC Dübendorf	3–2	FC Stäfa
FC Espagnol LS	0–1 (a.e.t.)	Grand-Lancy
FC Grandson-Tuileries	0–4	FC Renens
FC Les Breuleux	0–1	FC Bassecourt
FC Littau	3–2	FC Küssnacht am Rigi
Nordstern Basel	1–4	Concordia Basel
FC Rüti	2–2 (a.e.t.) (2–4 p)	FC Zürich-Affoltern
FC Salgesch	0–2	FC Naters
FC Seefeld Zürich	2–0	FC Glarus
Stade Nyonnais	2–0	Stade Lausanne
SV Schaffhausen	3–2 (a.e.t.)	YF Juventus
FC Zell	0–2	FC Sins
Düdingen	1–4	Central Fribourg
FC Aarberg	1–4	Münsingen
FC Männedorf	0–4	Freienbach
FC Teufen	0–1	Herisau
FC Bad Ragaz	2–3	Brühl
FC Eschenbach	1–4	FC Zug
Kreuzlingen	1–5	FC Rorschach
FC Leytron	3–4	FC Savièse
FC Rapid Lugano	0–7	Mendrisio
FC Visp	0–7	FC Raron
FC Bözingen 34	1–2	FC Courtételle
Biaschesi	1–3	FC Morbio
FC Maggia	1–3	FC Stabio
FC Lutry	1–0	ES Malley
FC Collex-Bossy	4–3	FC Versoix
FC Givisiez	2–7	FC Domdidier
FC Azzurri Bienne	0–4	Brugg

- Schöftland qualified for the second round with a bye for the first round.

== Round 2 ==
The 20 clubs from the Nationalliga B were granted byes for the first round and joined the competition in the second round. These teams were seeded and cound not be drawn against each other. The draw respected regionalities, when possible, and the lower classed team was granted home advantage.

=== Summary ===
Team 1	Score	Team 2
4–5 September 1993
FC Assens	0–6	FC Saint-Jean GE
FC Lutry	1–5	Monthey
FC Le Locle	0–1	Serrières
FC Klus-Balstahl	0–2	Old Boys
FC Aigle	1–0	Signal FC (Bernex)
FC Collex-Bossy	0–1	FC Fully
FC Chêne-Aubonne	1–7	Stade Nyonnais
Thun	3–2	Bulle
FC Fortuna (SG)	2–3	Freienbach
FC Stabio	0–2	Chiasso
FC Renens	0–2	Echallens
Martigny-Sports	5–1	FC Naters
FC Wyler Bern	7–0	La Chaux-de-Fonds
Chur	1–2	Red Star
Montreux-Sports	0–2	Étoile Carouge
FC Châtel-St-Denis	0–4 (a.e.t.)	Urania Genève Sport
FC Boudry	3–2 (a.e.t.)	FC Bassecourt
FC Rorschach	1–0 (a.e.t.)	FC Wil
FC Sins	1–1 (a.e.t.) (4–5 p)	Schöftland
FC Raron	2–1 (a.e.t.)	Grand-Lancy
SC Zug	0–10	Basel
FC Tresa	0–1	Bellinzona
Biel-Bienne	1–1 (a.e.t.) (4–3 p)	Colombier
FC Domdidier	0–2	Münsingen
Buochs	3–2	Concordia Basel
FC Pratteln	2–2 (a.e.t.) (2–4 p)	FC Suhr
Burgdorf	0–4	Bümpliz
Muttenz	2–3	Grenchen
FC Seefeld Zürich	0–6	Tuggen
FC Kölliken	2–2 (a.e.t.) (3–1 p)	FC Zug
FC Rheinfelden	0–8	FC Subingen
FC Frenkendorf	1–4	Emmenbrücke
FC Fehraltorf	1–4 (a.e.t.)	Frauenfeld
SV Schaffhausen	0–3	FC Dübendorf
FC Zürich-Affoltern	2–6	Gossau
FC Volketswil	1–3	Brühl
SV Seebach (Zürich)	0–8	Winterthur
SC Veltheim (Winterthur)	0–2	St. Gallen
Central Fribourg	4–2 (a.e.t.)	FC Lerchenfeld (Thun)
Bülach	2–1	FC Winkeln St.Gallen
FC Savièse	1–1 (a.e.t.) (2–4 p)	Chênois
SV Lyss	1–6	Fribourg
Dürrenast	2–1	FC Courtételle
FC Brüttisellen	3–5	FC Schaffhausen
FC Altstätten (St. Gallen)	0–2	FC Altstetten (Zürich)
FC Morbio	1–0 (a.e.t.)	FC Ascona
Herisau	0–6	Baden
FC Littau	0–0 (a.e.t.) (1–4 p)	Delémont
Mendrisio	1–3	Locarno
FC Riehen	0–0 (a.e.t.) (2–4 p)	FC Sursee
7 September 1993
Kickers Luzern	1–1 (a.e.t.) (2–4 p)	Solothurn
9 September 1993
FC Brunnen	5–2	Brugg

=== Matches ===
4 September 1993
19:30

SC Zug	0–10	Basel
Bilic (red card) 20'; Baumann (yellow card) 57'	FCB summary	3' (0:1) Karrer; 36' (0:2) Steingruber; 53' (o.g. 0:3) Hermann; 59' (0:4) Walker; 64' (0:5) Karrer; 76' (0:6) Berg; 79' (0:7) M. Rahmen; 83' (0:8) M. Rahmen; 85' (0:9) Zuffi; 88' (0:10) Berg

Herti Allmend Stadion, Zug
Attendance: 510
Referee: (Switzerland) Walter Nussbaumer

== Round 3 ==
The first-tier clubs from the 1993–94 Nationalliga A were granted byes for the first two rounds and joined the competition in this round. These teams were seeded and cound not be drawn against each other. The draw respected regionalities, when possible, and the lower classed team was granted home advantage.

=== Summary ===
Team 1	Score	Team 2
17 September 1993
Bellinzona	1–1 (a.e.t.) (5–3 p)	Kriens
Buochs	0–4	Baden
Frauenfeld	2–3	FC Altstetten (Zürich)
Fribourg	1–3	Yverdon-Sport
Solothurn	1–0	FC Sursee
Urania Genève Sport	0–2	Sion
18 September 1993
Serrières	0–2	FC Grenchen
FC Dübendorf	1–2	FC Lugano
FC Fully	2–5	Stade Nyonnais
FC Morbio	1–4	FC Gossau
Red Star	2–3	FC Locarno
FC Aigle	2–3	Chênois
Tuggen	1–6	St. Gallen
Bülach	1–2	Zürich
Dürrenast	0–4	Young Boys
Echallens	1–6	Servette
Freienbach	0–2	Grasshopper Club
FC Kölliken	0–5	Luzern
Münsingen	1–0	Thun
FC Subingen	0–9	Xamax
FC Wyler Bern	1–0	Biel-Bienne
Central Fribourg	1–2	Bümpliz
FC Saint-Jean Genève	2–13	Lausanne-Sport
Brühl	0–3	FC Schaffhausen
Emmenbrücke	1–4 (a.e.t.)	FC Suhr
Martigny-Sports	1–0 (a.e.t.)	FC Raron
FC Rorschach	1–3	Winterthur
FC Boudry	0–9	Delémont
FC Brunnen	1–2	Old Boys
Schöftland	1–4	FC Chiasso
Basel	4–1	Aarau
Monthey	3–2 (a.e.t.)	Étoile-Carouge

=== Matches ===
18 September 1993

Bülach	1–2	Zürich
Oberhänsli 26' (1:0)	FCZ summary	45' (1:1) Grassi; 57' (1:2) Şahin

Stadion Erachfeld, Bülach
Attendance: 1,302
Referee: (Switzerland) Hug

18 September 1993

Dürrenast	0–4	Young Boys
	YB summary	40' (0:1) Kunz; 47' (0:2) Kunz; 88' (0:3) Reich; 89' (0:4) Kunz

Stadion Lachen, Thun
Attendance: 1,400
Referee: (Switzerland) Gottfried Friedrich (Seedorf, Uri)

18 September 1993

Echallens	1–6	Servette
Pezzola 78' (1:5)	Servette summary	2' (0:1) Anderson; 27' (0:2) Anderson; 36' (0:3) Sauthier; 39' (0:4) Sinval; 58' (0:5) Schepull; 89' (1:6) Anderson

Sportplatz Trois Sapins, Échallens

18 September 1993

Freienbach	0–2	Grasshopper Club
	RSSSF summary	33' (0:1) Lombardo; 65' (0:2) Élber

Chrummen, Freienbach

18 September 1993

Münsingen	1–0	Thun
Christen 15' (1:0)	RSSSF summary

Sportanlage Sandreutenen, Münsingen

19 September 1993
20:00

Basel	4–1	Aarau
Cantaluppi (yellow card) 22'; Jeitziner 52' (pen. 1:1); Smajić (yellow card) 55'; Smajić 59' (2:1); Smajić 72' (3:1); Zuffi 78' (4:1); Walker (yellow card) 83'	FCB summary FCA summary	(yellow card) 14' Stiel; 18' (o.g. 0:1) Meier; (yellow card) 70' Romano

St. Jakob Stadium, Basel
Attendance: 12,500
Referee: (Switzerland) Dieter Schoch (Attiswil)

== Round 4 ==
=== Summary ===
Team 1	Score	Team 2
6 November 1993
FC Wyler Bern	1–6	Servette
St. Gallen	0–0 (a.e.t.) (4–5 p)	Zürich
Baden	3–1	Locarno
Chênois	4–4 (a.e.t.) (3–1 p)	Sion
Solothurn	1–3	Lugano
Yverdon-Sport	2–1	Young Boys
Basel	2–0	Lausanne-Sport
7 November 1993
FC Altstetten (Zürich)	1–5	Chiasso
Bellinzona	0–1	Xamax
Bümpliz	0–3	Old Boys
Delémont	3–0	Monthey
Gossau	0–1	Grasshopper Club
FC Suhr	0–2	FC Schaffhausen
Winterthur	0–1	Luzern
Martigny-Sports	5–2	Münsingen
Stade Nyonnais	0–0 (a.e.t.) (6–5 p)	Grenchen

=== Matches ===
6 November 1993

FC Wyler Bern	1–6	Servette
Roth 83' (1:5)	Servette summary	9' (0:1) Giallanza; 23' (0:2) Neuville; 44' (0:3) Aeby; 50' (0:4) Neuville; 52' (0:5) Egli; 85' (1:6) Neuville

Sportanlage Wyler, Bern

6 November 1993

St. Gallen	0–0 (a.e.t.)	Zürich
	FCZ summary
Penalties
Fischer (penalty missed); Gambino (penalty scored); Vernier (penalty scored); Gertschen (penalty scored); Fodor (penalty scored); Tiefenbach (penalty missed)	4–5	(penalty missed) Ernst; (penalty scored) Şahin; (penalty scored) Škoro; (penalty scored) Waas; (penalty scored) Blättler; (penalty scored) Kägi

Espenmoos, St. Gallen
Attendance: 4,000
Referee: (Switzerland) Werner Müller (Obererlinsbach)

6 November 1993

Chênois	4–4 (a.e.t.)	Sion
Baumann 55' (1:2); Dimic 58' (2:2); Hadjami 92' (3:2); Rodriguez 120+2' (pen. 4:4)	BaZ summary	12' (0:1) Rey; 48' (0:2) Rey; 101' (3:3) Fournier; 111' (3:4) Rey
Penalties
Rothenbühler (penalty scored); Rodriguez (penalty scored); Tarare (penalty missed); Ursea (penalty missed); Mattioli (penalty scored)	3–1	(penalty scored) Quentin; (penalty missed) Giannini; (penalty missed) Geiger; (penalty missed) Assis

Stade des Trois-Chêne, Chêne-Bourg
Attendance: 1,150
Referee: (Switzerland) M. Köhli (Thörishaus in Köniz)

6 November 1993

Yverdon-Sport	2–1	Young Boys
Urosevic 67' (pen.); Karlen 85' (2:1)	YB summary	43' (0:1) Bregy

Stade Municipal, Yverdon-les-Bains
Attendance: 3,300
Referee: (Switzerland) Urs Meier (Würenlos)

6 November 1993
20:00

Basel	2–0	Lausanne-Sport
Zuffi 45' (1:0); Smajić 57' (2:0); Smajić (yellow card) 84'	FCB summary	(yellow card) 24' Sylvestre; (yellow card) 34' Comisetti

St. Jakob Stadium, Basel
Attendance: 15,850
Referee: (Switzerland) Serge Muhmenthaler (Grenchen)

7 November 1993
14:30

Bümpliz	0–3	Old Boys
	RSSSF summary	2' (0:1) Saibene; 21' (pen.) Hauck; 55' (0:3) Adobe

Bodenweid, Bern

7 November 1993
14:30

Gossau	0–1	Grasshopper Club
	RSSSF summary	11' (0:1) Wiederkehr

Sportanlage Buechenwald, Gossau

== Round 5 ==
=== Summary ===
Team 1	Score	Team 2
12 February 1994
Chiasso	2–1	Servette
Basel	1–0	Xamax
13 February 1994
Lugano	1–2	Grasshopper Club
Yverdon-Sport	3–1	Luzern
26 February 1994
Martigny-Sports	0–1	Old Boys
2 March 1994
Chênois	1–3	Zürich
9 March 1994
FC Schaffhausen	0–0 (a.e.t.) (5–4 p)	Delémont
Stade Nyonnais	0–0 (a.e.t.) (10–11 p)	Baden

=== Matches ===
12 February 1994

Chiasso	2–1	Servette
R.Negri 2' (1:0); M.Negri 82' (2:1)	Servette summary	27' (1:1) Grassi

Stadio Comunale Riva IV, Chiasso

12 February 1994
17:30

Basel	1–0	Xamax
Zuffi 51' (1:0); Walker (yellow card) 69'	FCB summary	(yellow card) 50' Sutter; (yellow card) 66' Henchoz

St. Jakob Stadium, Basel
Attendance: 12,290
Referee: (Switzerland) Serge Muhmenthaler (Grenchen)

13 February 1994

Lugano	1–2	Grasshopper Club
Galvao 55' (1:2)	RSSSF summary	34' (0:1) Yakin; 43' (0:2) Bickel

Cornaredo, Lugano

26 February 1994

Martigny-Sports	0–1	Old Boys
	RSSSF summary	52' (pen.) Saibene

Stade d'Octodure, Martigny

2 March

Chênois	1–3	Zürich
Tarare 29' (1:1)	FCZ summary	5' (0:1) Giuseppe Mazzarelli; 72' (1:2) Škoro; 84' (1:3) Hodel

Stade des Trois-Chêne, Thônex
Attendance: 750
Referee: Daniel Roduit Sion, Switzerland

== Quarter-finals ==
=== Summary ===
Team 1	Score	Team 2
23 March 1994
FC Schaffhausen	3–1	Old Boys
Baden	1–5	Grasshopper Club
Basel	1–0 (a.e.t.)	Yverdon-Sport
Chiasso	0–1	Zürich

=== Matches ===
23 March 1994

FC Schaffhausen	3–1	Old Boys
Zibert 45' (1:0); Zibert 48' (2:0); Guirao 86' (3:0)	RSSSF summary	88' (3:1) Varano

Stadion Breite, Schaffhausen

23 March 1994

Baden	1–5	Grasshopper Club
Zambotti 90+2' (1:5)	RSSSF summary	6' (0:1) Yakin; 13' (0:2) Élber; 27' (0:3) Élber; 28' (0:4) Élber; 65' (0:5) Élber

Esp Stadium, Fislisbach

23 March 1994
20:00

Basel	1–0 (a.e.t.)	Yverdon-Sports
Tabakovic (yellow card) 49'; Karrer (yellow card) 105'; Zuffi 118' (1:0)	FCB summary	(yellow card) 3' Dériaz; (yellow card) 86' Juárez; (yellow card) 89' Guex

St. Jakob Stadium, Basel
Attendance: 14,620
Referee: (Switzerland) Kurt Röthlisberger (Suhr)

23 March 1994

Chiasso	0–1	Zürich
Morandi (yellow card)	FCZ summary	67' (0:1) Ernst; (yellow card) Hodel; (yellow card) Blättler; (yellow card) Kägi

Stadio Comunale Riva IV, Chiasso
Attendance: 750
Referee: (Switzerland) Kurt Zuppinger (Bremgarten)

== Semi-finals ==
=== Summary ===
Team 1	Score	Team 2
4 April 1994
Basel	0–0 (a.e.t.) (5–6 p)	FC Schaffhausen
Zürich	1–2	Grasshopper Club

=== Matches ===
4 April 1994
17:00

Basel	0–0 (a.e.t.)	Schaffhausen
Smajić (yellow card) 13'	Summary	(yellow card) 21' Ziffert; (yellow card) 101' Pagno; (yellow card) 111' Stübi
Penalties
Zuffi (penalty missed); Jeitziner (penalty scored); Steingruber (penalty scored); Meier (penalty scored); Kruse (penalty scored); Smajić (penalty scored); Tabakovic (penalty missed)	5–6	(penalty scored) Ziffert; (penalty missed) Engesser; (penalty scored) Kuzmanovic; (penalty scored) Beer; (penalty scored) Pagno; (penalty scored) Stübi; (penalty scored) Zibert

St. Jakob Stadium, Basel
Attendance: 23,344
Referee: (Switzerland)

4 April 1994

Zürich	1–2	Grasshopper Club
Şahin (yellow card) 58'; Şahin 65' (pen. 1:1)	FCZ summary	60' (0:1) Willems; 90' (1:2) Élber

Letzigrund, Zürich
Attendance: 13,500
Referee: (Switzerland) Serge Muhmenthaler (Grenchen)

== Final ==
=== Summary ===
Team 1	Score	Team 2
15 May 1994
Grasshopper Club	4–0	FC Schaffhausen

=== Telegram ===
15 May 1994
15:00

Grasshopper Club	4–0	FC Schaffhausen
Bickel 5' (1:0); Gämperle (yellow card) 14'; Vega 35' (2:0); Lombardo (yellow card) 64'; Magnin 71' (3:0); Magnin 77' (4:0)	Fussball-Schweiz summary

Wankdorf, Bern
Attendance: 12,000
Referee: (Switzerland) Daniel Roduit (Châteauneuf)

Grasshopper Club won the cup and this was the club's 18th cup title to this date.

== See also ==
- 1993–94 Nationalliga A
- 1993–94 Nationalliga B
- 1993–94 Swiss 1. Liga

== Sources and references ==
- RSSSF Page

Preceded by 1992–93	Seasons in Swiss Cup	Succeeded by 1994–95
