= UEFA Euro 1996 squads =

These are the squads for the UEFA Euro 1996 tournament, which took place in England between 8 June and 30 June 1996. The players' listed ages are as of the tournament's opening day (8 June 1996).

== Group A ==
=== England ===
Coach: Terry Venables

Terry Venables announced England's 22-man squad on 28 May 1996.

No.	Pos.	Player	Date of birth (age)	Caps	Club
1	GK	David Seaman	19 September 1963 (aged 32)	24	(England) Arsenal
2	DF	Gary Neville	18 February 1975 (aged 21)	10	(England) Manchester United
3	DF	Stuart Pearce	24 April 1962 (aged 34)	65	(England) Nottingham Forest
4	MF	Paul Ince	21 October 1967 (aged 28)	19	(Italy) Internazionale
5	DF	Tony Adams (captain)	10 October 1966 (aged 29)	40	(England) Arsenal
6	DF	Gareth Southgate	3 September 1970 (aged 25)	4	(England) Aston Villa
7	MF	David Platt	10 June 1966 (aged 29)	58	(England) Arsenal
8	MF	Paul Gascoigne	27 May 1967 (aged 29)	38	(Scotland) Rangers
9	FW	Alan Shearer	13 August 1970 (aged 25)	23	(England) Blackburn Rovers
10	FW	Teddy Sheringham	2 April 1966 (aged 30)	15	(England) Tottenham Hotspur
11	MF	Darren Anderton	3 March 1972 (aged 24)	11	(England) Tottenham Hotspur
12	DF	Steve Howey	26 October 1971 (aged 24)	4	(England) Newcastle United
13	GK	Tim Flowers	3 February 1967 (aged 29)	8	(England) Blackburn Rovers
14	MF	Nick Barmby	11 February 1974 (aged 22)	6	(England) Middlesbrough
15	MF	Jamie Redknapp	25 June 1973 (aged 22)	4	(England) Liverpool
16	DF	Sol Campbell	18 September 1974 (aged 21)	1	(England) Tottenham Hotspur
17	MF	Steve McManaman	11 February 1972 (aged 24)	10	(England) Liverpool
18	FW	Les Ferdinand	8 December 1966 (aged 29)	10	(England) Newcastle United
19	DF	Phil Neville	21 January 1977 (aged 19)	1	(England) Manchester United
20	MF	Steve Stone	20 August 1971 (aged 24)	6	(England) Nottingham Forest
21	FW	Robbie Fowler	9 April 1975 (aged 21)	3	(England) Liverpool
22	GK	Ian Walker	31 October 1971 (aged 24)	2	(England) Tottenham Hotspur

=== Netherlands ===
Coach: Guus Hiddink

No.	Pos.	Player	Date of birth (age)	Caps	Club
1	GK	Edwin van der Sar	29 October 1970 (aged 25)	7	(Netherlands) Ajax
2	DF	Michael Reiziger	3 May 1973 (aged 23)	8	(Netherlands) Ajax
3	DF	Danny Blind (captain)	1 August 1961 (aged 34)	39	(Netherlands) Ajax
4	MF	Clarence Seedorf	1 April 1976 (aged 20)	11	(Italy) Sampdoria
5	DF	Jaap Stam (Injury replacement for Frank de Boer)	17 July 1972 (aged 23)	1	(Netherlands) PSV Eindhoven
6	MF	Ronald de Boer	15 May 1970 (aged 26)	24	(Netherlands) Ajax
7	FW	Gaston Taument	1 October 1970 (aged 25)	13	(Netherlands) Feyenoord
8	MF	Edgar Davids	13 March 1973 (aged 23)	7	(Netherlands) Ajax
9	FW	Patrick Kluivert	1 July 1976 (aged 19)	6	(Netherlands) Ajax
10	FW	Dennis Bergkamp	10 May 1969 (aged 27)	45	(England) Arsenal
11	FW	Peter Hoekstra	4 April 1973 (aged 23)	3	(Netherlands) Ajax
12	MF	Aron Winter	1 March 1967 (aged 29)	54	(Italy) Lazio
13	DF	Arthur Numan	14 December 1969 (aged 26)	14	(Netherlands) PSV Eindhoven
14	MF	Richard Witschge	20 September 1969 (aged 26)	25	(France) Bordeaux
15	DF	Winston Bogarde	22 October 1970 (aged 25)	3	(Netherlands) Ajax
16	GK	Ed de Goey	20 December 1966 (aged 29)	28	(Netherlands) Feyenoord
17	MF	Jordi Cruyff	9 February 1974 (aged 22)	3	(Spain) Barcelona
18	DF	Johan de Kock	25 October 1964 (aged 31)	8	(Netherlands) Roda JC
19	FW	Youri Mulder	23 March 1969 (aged 27)	7	(Germany) Schalke 04
20	MF	Phillip Cocu	29 October 1970 (aged 25)	3	(Netherlands) PSV Eindhoven
21	GK	Ruud Hesp	31 October 1965 (aged 30)	0	(Netherlands) Roda JC
22	DF	John Veldman	24 February 1968 (aged 28)	1	(Netherlands) Sparta Rotterdam

=== Scotland ===
Coach: Craig Brown

No.	Pos.	Player	Date of birth (age)	Caps	Club
1	GK	Jim Leighton	24 July 1958 (aged 37)	74	(Scotland) Hibernian
2	DF	Stewart McKimmie	27 October 1962 (aged 33)	38	(Scotland) Aberdeen
3	DF	Tom Boyd	24 November 1965 (aged 30)	35	(Scotland) Celtic
4	DF	Colin Calderwood	20 January 1965 (aged 31)	11	(England) Tottenham Hotspur
5	DF	Colin Hendry	7 December 1965 (aged 30)	18	(England) Blackburn Rovers
6	DF	Derek Whyte	31 August 1968 (aged 27)	9	(England) Middlesbrough
7	FW	John Spencer	11 September 1970 (aged 25)	9	(England) Chelsea
8	MF	Stuart McCall	10 June 1964 (aged 31)	34	(Scotland) Rangers
9	FW	Ally McCoist	24 September 1962 (aged 33)	52	(Scotland) Rangers
10	MF	Gary McAllister (captain)	25 December 1964 (aged 31)	41	(England) Leeds United
11	MF	John Collins	31 January 1968 (aged 28)	33	(Scotland) Celtic
12	GK	Andy Goram	13 April 1964 (aged 32)	36	(Scotland) Rangers
13	DF	Tosh McKinlay	3 December 1964 (aged 31)	4	(Scotland) Celtic
14	FW	Gordon Durie	6 December 1965 (aged 30)	28	(Scotland) Rangers
15	MF	Eoin Jess	13 December 1970 (aged 25)	12	(England) Coventry City
16	DF	Craig Burley	24 September 1971 (aged 24)	9	(England) Chelsea
17	MF	Billy McKinlay	22 April 1969 (aged 27)	17	(England) Blackburn Rovers
18	FW	Kevin Gallacher	23 November 1966 (aged 29)	22	(England) Blackburn Rovers
19	MF	Darren Jackson	25 July 1966 (aged 29)	12	(Scotland) Hibernian
20	FW	Scott Booth	16 December 1971 (aged 24)	11	(Scotland) Aberdeen
21	MF	Scot Gemmill	2 January 1971 (aged 25)	6	(England) Nottingham Forest
22	GK	Nicky Walker	29 September 1962 (aged 33)	2	(Scotland) Partick Thistle

=== Switzerland ===
Coach: (Portugal) Artur Jorge

No.	Pos.	Player	Date of birth (age)	Caps	Club
1	GK	Marco Pascolo	9 May 1966 (aged 30)	36	(Switzerland) Servette
2	DF	Marc Hottiger	7 November 1967 (aged 28)	60	(England) Everton
3	DF	Yvan Quentin	2 May 1970 (aged 26)	26	(Switzerland) Sion
4	DF	Stéphane Henchoz	7 September 1974 (aged 21)	16	(Germany) Hamburger SV
5	DF	Alain Geiger (captain)	5 November 1960 (aged 35)	110	(Switzerland) Grasshopper
6	MF	Raphaël Wicky	26 April 1977 (aged 19)	1	(Switzerland) Sion
7	MF	Sébastien Fournier	27 June 1971 (aged 24)	11	(Switzerland) Sion
8	MF	Patrick Sylvestre	1 September 1968 (aged 27)	47	(Switzerland) Sion
9	FW	Marco Grassi	8 August 1968 (aged 27)	22	(France) Rennes
10	MF	Ciriaco Sforza	2 March 1970 (aged 26)	40	(Germany) Bayern Munich
11	FW	Stéphane Chapuisat	28 June 1969 (aged 26)	46	(Germany) Borussia Dortmund
12	GK	Stephan Lehmann	15 August 1963 (aged 32)	7	(Switzerland) Sion
13	DF	Sébastien Jeanneret	12 December 1973 (aged 22)	1	(Switzerland) Neuchâtel Xamax
14	FW	Kubilay Türkyilmaz	4 March 1967 (aged 29)	48	(Switzerland) Grasshopper
15	DF	Ramon Vega	14 June 1971 (aged 24)	8	(Switzerland) Grasshopper
16	MF	Marcel Koller	11 November 1960 (aged 35)	52	(Switzerland) Grasshopper
17	MF	Johann Vogel	8 March 1977 (aged 19)	4	(Switzerland) Grasshopper
18	DF	Régis Rothenbühler	11 October 1970 (aged 25)	10	(Switzerland) Neuchâtel Xamax
19	FW	David Sesa	10 July 1973 (aged 22)	1	(Switzerland) Servette
20	MF	Alexandre Comisetti	21 July 1973 (aged 22)	3	(Switzerland) Grasshopper
21	MF	Christophe Bonvin	14 April 1965 (aged 31)	41	(Switzerland) Sion
22	GK	Joël Corminboeuf	16 March 1964 (aged 32)	6	(Switzerland) Neuchâtel Xamax

== Group B ==
=== Bulgaria ===
Coach: Dimitar Penev

No.	Pos.	Player	Date of birth (age)	Caps	Club
1	GK	Borislav Mihaylov (captain)	12 February 1963 (aged 33)	88	(England) Reading
2	DF	Radostin Kishishev	30 July 1974 (aged 21)	6	(Bulgaria) Neftohimik Burgas
3	DF	Trifon Ivanov	27 July 1965 (aged 30)	59	(Austria) Rapid Wien
4	DF	Iliyan Kiryakov	4 August 1967 (aged 28)	55	(Cyprus) Anorthosis
5	DF	Petar Hubchev	26 February 1964 (aged 32)	31	(Germany) Hamburger SV
6	MF	Zlatko Yankov	7 June 1966 (aged 30)	51	(Germany) Uerdingen 05
7	FW	Emil Kostadinov	12 August 1967 (aged 28)	52	(Germany) Bayern Munich
8	FW	Hristo Stoichkov	8 February 1966 (aged 30)	60	(Italy) Parma
9	FW	Lyuboslav Penev	31 August 1966 (aged 29)	48	(Spain) Atlético Madrid
10	MF	Krasimir Balakov	29 March 1966 (aged 30)	53	(Germany) VfB Stuttgart
11	MF	Yordan Letchkov	9 July 1967 (aged 28)	35	(Germany) Hamburger SV
12	GK	Dimitar Popov	27 February 1970 (aged 26)	13	(Bulgaria) CSKA Sofia
13	MF	Boncho Genchev	7 July 1964 (aged 31)	11	(England) Luton Town
14	FW	Nasko Sirakov	26 April 1962 (aged 34)	79	(Bulgaria) Slavia Sofia
15	MF	Ivaylo Yordanov	22 April 1968 (aged 28)	24	(Portugal) Sporting CP
16	MF	Daniel Borimirov	15 January 1970 (aged 26)	23	(Germany) 1860 Munich
17	DF	Emil Kremenliev	13 August 1969 (aged 26)	26	(Greece) Olympiacos
18	DF	Tsanko Tsvetanov	6 January 1970 (aged 26)	34	(Germany) Waldhof Mannheim
19	DF	Gosho Ginchev	2 February 1969 (aged 27)	5	(Turkey) Denizlispor
20	FW	Georgi Donkov	2 June 1970 (aged 26)	3	(Bulgaria) CSKA Sofia
21	FW	Ivo Georgiev	12 May 1972 (aged 24)	1	(Bulgaria) Spartak Varna
22	GK	Zdravko Zdravkov	4 October 1970 (aged 25)	3	(Bulgaria) Slavia Sofia

=== France ===
Coach: Aimé Jacquet

No.	Pos.	Player	Date of birth (age)	Caps	Club
1	GK	Bernard Lama	7 April 1963 (aged 33)	29	(France) Paris Saint-Germain
2	DF	Jocelyn Angloma	7 August 1965 (aged 30)	35	(Italy) Torino
3	DF	Éric Di Meco	7 September 1963 (aged 32)	22	(France) Monaco
4	DF	Frank Leboeuf	22 January 1968 (aged 28)	9	(France) Strasbourg
5	DF	Laurent Blanc	19 November 1965 (aged 30)	51	(France) Auxerre
6	MF	Vincent Guérin	22 November 1965 (aged 30)	14	(France) Paris Saint-Germain
7	MF	Didier Deschamps (captain)	15 October 1968 (aged 27)	53	(Italy) Juventus
8	DF	Marcel Desailly	7 September 1968 (aged 27)	25	(Italy) Milan
9	MF	Youri Djorkaeff	9 March 1968 (aged 28)	20	(France) Paris Saint-Germain
10	MF	Zinedine Zidane	23 June 1972 (aged 23)	15	(France) Bordeaux
11	FW	Patrice Loko	6 February 1970 (aged 26)	17	(France) Paris Saint-Germain
12	DF	Bixente Lizarazu	9 December 1969 (aged 26)	21	(France) Bordeaux
13	FW	Christophe Dugarry	24 March 1972 (aged 24)	11	(France) Bordeaux
14	MF	Sabri Lamouchi	9 November 1971 (aged 24)	8	(France) Auxerre
15	DF	Lilian Thuram	1 January 1972 (aged 24)	14	(France) Monaco
16	GK	Fabien Barthez	28 June 1971 (aged 24)	4	(France) Monaco
17	FW	Mickaël Madar	8 May 1968 (aged 28)	3	(France) Monaco
18	MF	Reynald Pedros	10 October 1971 (aged 24)	22	(France) Nantes
19	MF	Christian Karembeu	3 December 1970 (aged 25)	20	(Italy) Sampdoria
20	DF	Alain Roche	14 October 1967 (aged 28)	22	(France) Paris Saint-Germain
21	MF	Corentin Martins	11 July 1969 (aged 26)	14	(France) Auxerre
22	GK	Bruno Martini	25 January 1962 (aged 34)	31	(France) Montpellier

=== Romania ===
Coach: Anghel Iordănescu

No.	Pos.	Player	Date of birth (age)	Caps	Club
1	GK	Bogdan Stelea	5 December 1967 (aged 28)	33	(Romania) Steaua București
2	DF	Dan Petrescu	22 December 1967 (aged 28)	51	(England) Chelsea
3	DF	Daniel Prodan	23 March 1972 (aged 24)	32	(Romania) Steaua București
4	DF	Miodrag Belodedici	20 May 1964 (aged 32)	47	(Spain) Villarreal
5	MF	Ioan Lupescu	9 December 1968 (aged 27)	48	(Germany) Bayer Leverkusen
6	DF	Gheorghe Popescu	9 October 1967 (aged 28)	80	(Spain) Barcelona
7	FW	Marius Lăcătuș	5 April 1964 (aged 32)	74	(Romania) Steaua București
8	MF	Ioan Sabău	12 February 1968 (aged 28)	47	(Italy) Brescia
9	FW	Florin Răducioiu	17 March 1970 (aged 26)	37	(Spain) Espanyol
10	MF	Gheorghe Hagi (captain)	5 February 1965 (aged 31)	97	(Spain) Barcelona
11	MF	Dorinel Munteanu	25 June 1968 (aged 27)	46	(Germany) 1. FC Köln
12	GK	Florin Prunea	8 August 1968 (aged 27)	31	(Romania) Dinamo București
13	DF	Tibor Selymes	14 May 1970 (aged 26)	29	(Belgium) Cercle Brugge
14	MF	Constantin Gâlcă	8 March 1972 (aged 24)	17	(Romania) Steaua București
15	DF	Anton Doboș	13 October 1965 (aged 30)	8	(Romania) Steaua București
16	DF	Gheorghe Mihali	9 December 1965 (aged 30)	30	(France) Guingamp
17	DF	Iulian Filipescu	29 March 1974 (aged 22)	5	(Romania) Steaua București
18	MF	Ovidiu Stîngă	5 December 1972 (aged 23)	13	(Spain) Salamanca
19	FW	Adrian Ilie	20 April 1974 (aged 22)	5	(Romania) Steaua București
20	FW	Viorel Moldovan	8 July 1972 (aged 23)	10	(Switzerland) Neuchâtel Xamax
21	FW	Ion Vlădoiu	5 November 1968 (aged 27)	19	(Romania) Steaua București
22	GK	Florin Tene	10 November 1968 (aged 27)	6	(Romania) Rapid București

=== Spain ===
Coach: Javier Clemente

No.	Pos.	Player	Date of birth (age)	Caps	Club
1	GK	Andoni Zubizarreta (captain)	23 October 1961 (aged 34)	106	(Spain) Valencia
2	DF	Juanma López	3 September 1969 (aged 26)	7	(Spain) Atlético Madrid
3	DF	Alberto Belsué	2 March 1968 (aged 28)	12	(Spain) Zaragoza
4	DF	Rafael Alkorta	16 September 1968 (aged 27)	35	(Spain) Real Madrid
5	DF	Abelardo	19 April 1970 (aged 26)	25	(Spain) Barcelona
6	MF	Fernando Hierro	23 March 1968 (aged 28)	41	(Spain) Real Madrid
7	FW	José Amavisca	19 June 1971 (aged 24)	10	(Spain) Real Madrid
8	MF	Julen Guerrero	7 January 1974 (aged 22)	22	(Spain) Athletic Bilbao
9	FW	Juan Antonio Pizzi	7 June 1968 (aged 28)	11	(Spain) Tenerife
10	MF	Donato	30 December 1962 (aged 33)	11	(Spain) Deportivo La Coruña
11	FW	Alfonso	26 September 1972 (aged 23)	11	(Spain) Real Betis
12	DF	Sergi	28 December 1971 (aged 24)	18	(Spain) Barcelona
13	GK	Santiago Cañizares	18 December 1969 (aged 26)	9	(Spain) Real Madrid
14	FW	Kiko	26 April 1972 (aged 24)	8	(Spain) Atlético Madrid
15	MF	José Luis Caminero	8 November 1967 (aged 28)	18	(Spain) Atlético Madrid
16	DF	Jorge Otero	28 January 1969 (aged 27)	8	(Spain) Valencia
17	MF	Javier Manjarín	31 December 1969 (aged 26)	6	(Spain) Deportivo La Coruña
18	MF	Guillermo Amor	4 December 1967 (aged 28)	18	(Spain) Barcelona
19	FW	Julio Salinas	11 September 1962 (aged 33)	54	(Spain) Sporting Gijón
20	DF	Miguel Ángel Nadal	28 July 1966 (aged 29)	30	(Spain) Barcelona
21	MF	Luis Enrique	8 May 1970 (aged 26)	22	(Spain) Real Madrid
22	GK	José Francisco Molina	8 August 1970 (aged 25)	1	(Spain) Atlético Madrid

== Group C ==
=== Czech Republic ===
Coach: Dušan Uhrin

No.	Pos.	Player	Date of birth (age)	Caps	Club
1	GK	Petr Kouba	28 November 1969 (aged 26)	30	(Czech Republic) Sparta Prague
2	MF	Radoslav Látal	6 January 1970 (aged 26)	29	(Germany) Schalke 04
3	DF	Jan Suchopárek	23 September 1969 (aged 26)	31	(Czech Republic) Slavia Prague
4	MF	Pavel Nedvěd	30 August 1972 (aged 23)	9	(Czech Republic) Sparta Prague
5	DF	Miroslav Kadlec	22 June 1964 (aged 31)	53	(Germany) Kaiserslautern
6	MF	Václav Němeček (captain)	25 January 1967 (aged 29)	56	(Switzerland) Servette
7	MF	Jiří Němec	15 May 1966 (aged 30)	35	(Germany) Schalke 04
8	MF	Karel Poborský	30 March 1972 (aged 24)	14	(Czech Republic) Slavia Prague
9	FW	Pavel Kuka	19 July 1968 (aged 27)	43	(Germany) Kaiserslautern
10	FW	Radek Drulák	12 January 1962 (aged 34)	13	(Czech Republic) Petra Drnovice
11	MF	Martin Frýdek	9 March 1969 (aged 27)	24	(Czech Republic) Sparta Prague
12	DF	Luboš Kubík	20 January 1964 (aged 32)	48	(Czech Republic) Petra Drnovice
13	MF	Radek Bejbl	29 August 1972 (aged 23)	8	(Czech Republic) Slavia Prague
14	MF	Patrik Berger	10 November 1973 (aged 22)	15	(Germany) Borussia Dortmund
15	DF	Michal Horňák	28 April 1970 (aged 26)	6	(Czech Republic) Sparta Prague
16	GK	Pavel Srníček	10 March 1968 (aged 28)	4	(England) Newcastle United
17	MF	Vladimír Šmicer	24 May 1973 (aged 23)	3	(Czech Republic) Slavia Prague
18	DF	Martin Kotůlek	11 September 1969 (aged 26)	3	(Czech Republic) Sigma Olomouc
19	DF	Karel Rada	2 March 1971 (aged 25)	2	(Czech Republic) Sigma Olomouc
20	MF	Pavel Novotný	14 September 1973 (aged 22)	0	(Czech Republic) Slavia Prague
21	FW	Milan Kerbr	9 June 1967 (aged 28)	2	(Czech Republic) Sigma Olomouc
22	GK	Ladislav Maier	4 January 1966 (aged 30)	1	(Czech Republic) Slovan Liberec

=== Germany ===
Coach: Berti Vogts

Germany were allowed to call up an additional player, Jens Todt, prior to the final, due to injury problems.

No.	Pos.	Player	Date of birth (age)	Caps	Club
1	GK	Andreas Köpke	12 March 1962 (aged 34)	33	(Germany) Eintracht Frankfurt
2	DF	Stefan Reuter	16 October 1966 (aged 29)	53	(Germany) Borussia Dortmund
3	MF	Marco Bode	23 July 1969 (aged 26)	3	(Germany) Werder Bremen
4	MF	Steffen Freund	19 January 1970 (aged 26)	15	(Germany) Borussia Dortmund
5	DF	Thomas Helmer	21 April 1965 (aged 31)	48	(Germany) Bayern Munich
6	DF	Matthias Sammer	5 September 1967 (aged 28)	64	(Germany) Borussia Dortmund
7	MF	Andreas Möller	2 September 1967 (aged 28)	61	(Germany) Borussia Dortmund
8	MF	Mehmet Scholl	16 October 1970 (aged 25)	9	(Germany) Bayern Munich
9	FW	Fredi Bobic	30 October 1971 (aged 24)	8	(Germany) VfB Stuttgart
10	MF	Thomas Häßler	30 May 1966 (aged 30)	74	(Germany) Karlsruhe
11	FW	Stefan Kuntz	30 October 1962 (aged 33)	18	(Turkey) Beşiktaş
12	GK	Oliver Kahn	15 June 1969 (aged 26)	4	(Germany) Bayern Munich
13	MF	Mario Basler	18 December 1968 (aged 27)	19	(Germany) Werder Bremen
14	DF	Markus Babbel	8 September 1972 (aged 23)	14	(Germany) Bayern Munich
15	DF	Jürgen Kohler	6 October 1965 (aged 30)	83	(Germany) Borussia Dortmund
16	DF	René Schneider	1 February 1973 (aged 23)	1	(Germany) Hansa Rostock
17	DF	Christian Ziege	1 February 1972 (aged 24)	19	(Germany) Bayern Munich
18	FW	Jürgen Klinsmann (captain)	30 July 1964 (aged 31)	85	(Germany) Bayern Munich
19	MF	Thomas Strunz	25 April 1968 (aged 28)	27	(Germany) Bayern Munich
20	FW	Oliver Bierhoff	1 May 1968 (aged 28)	5	(Italy) Udinese
21	MF	Dieter Eilts	13 December 1964 (aged 31)	17	(Germany) Werder Bremen
22	GK	Oliver Reck	27 February 1965 (aged 31)	1	(Germany) Werder Bremen
23	MF	Jens Todt	5 January 1970 (aged 26)	3	(Germany) Freiburg

=== Italy ===
Coach: Arrigo Sacchi

No.	Pos.	Player	Date of birth (age)	Caps	Club
1	GK	Angelo Peruzzi	16 February 1970 (aged 26)	8	(Italy) Juventus
2	DF	Luigi Apolloni	2 May 1967 (aged 29)	13	(Italy) Parma
3	DF	Paolo Maldini (captain)	26 June 1968 (aged 27)	69	(Italy) Milan
4	DF	Amedeo Carboni	6 April 1965 (aged 31)	12	(Italy) Roma
5	DF	Alessandro Costacurta	24 April 1966 (aged 30)	36	(Italy) Milan
6	DF	Alessandro Nesta	19 March 1976 (aged 20)	0	(Italy) Lazio
7	MF	Roberto Donadoni	9 September 1963 (aged 32)	60	(United States) MetroStars
8	DF	Roberto Mussi	25 August 1963 (aged 32)	8	(Italy) Parma
9	DF	Moreno Torricelli	23 January 1970 (aged 26)	4	(Italy) Juventus
10	MF	Demetrio Albertini	23 August 1971 (aged 24)	40	(Italy) Milan
11	MF	Dino Baggio	24 July 1971 (aged 24)	34	(Italy) Parma
12	GK	Francesco Toldo	2 December 1971 (aged 24)	3	(Italy) Fiorentina
13	MF	Fabio Rossitto	21 September 1971 (aged 24)	1	(Italy) Udinese
14	FW	Alessandro Del Piero	9 November 1974 (aged 21)	10	(Italy) Juventus
15	MF	Angelo Di Livio	26 July 1966 (aged 29)	5	(Italy) Juventus
16	MF	Roberto Di Matteo	29 May 1970 (aged 26)	14	(Italy) Lazio
17	MF	Diego Fuser	11 November 1968 (aged 27)	5	(Italy) Lazio
18	FW	Pierluigi Casiraghi	4 March 1969 (aged 27)	32	(Italy) Lazio
19	FW	Enrico Chiesa	29 December 1970 (aged 25)	2	(Italy) Sampdoria
20	FW	Fabrizio Ravanelli	12 November 1968 (aged 27)	10	(Italy) Juventus
21	FW	Gianfranco Zola	5 July 1966 (aged 29)	14	(Italy) Parma
22	GK	Luca Bucci	13 March 1969 (aged 27)	3	(Italy) Parma

=== Russia ===
Coach: Oleg Romantsev

Caps include those for USSR, CIS, and Russia, while those for other countries, such as Ukraine, are not counted.

No.	Pos.	Player	Date of birth (age)	Caps	Club
1	GK	Dmitri Kharine	16 August 1968 (aged 27)	35	(England) Chelsea
2	DF	Omari Tetradze	13 October 1969 (aged 26)	23	(Russia) Alania Vladikavkaz
3	DF	Yuri Nikiforov	16 September 1970 (aged 25)	30	(Russia) Spartak Moscow
4	MF	Ilya Tsymbalar	17 June 1969 (aged 26)	16	(Russia) Spartak Moscow
5	DF	Yuri Kovtun	5 January 1970 (aged 26)	16	(Russia) Dynamo Moscow
6	MF	Valery Karpin	2 February 1969 (aged 27)	31	(Spain) Real Sociedad
7	DF	Viktor Onopko (captain)	14 October 1969 (aged 26)	43	(Spain) Oviedo
8	MF	Andrei Kanchelskis	23 January 1969 (aged 27)	44	(England) Everton
9	FW	Igor Kolyvanov	6 March 1968 (aged 28)	42	(Italy) Foggia
10	MF	Aleksandr Mostovoi	22 August 1968 (aged 27)	32	(France) Strasbourg
11	FW	Sergei Kiriakov	1 January 1970 (aged 26)	35	(Germany) Karlsruher SC
12	GK	Stanislav Cherchesov	2 September 1963 (aged 32)	36	(Austria) Tirol Innsbruck
13	DF	Yevgeni Bushmanov	2 November 1971 (aged 24)	3	(Russia) CSKA Moscow
14	MF	Igor Dobrovolski	27 August 1967 (aged 28)	45	Unattached
15	MF	Igor Shalimov	2 February 1969 (aged 27)	44	(Italy) Udinese
16	FW	Igor Simutenkov	3 April 1973 (aged 23)	7	(Italy) Reggiana
17	FW	Vladimir Beschastnykh	1 April 1974 (aged 22)	18	(Germany) Werder Bremen
18	MF	Igor Yanovsky	3 August 1974 (aged 21)	2	(Russia) Alania Vladikavkaz
19	MF	Vladislav Radimov	26 November 1975 (aged 20)	9	(Russia) CSKA Moscow
20	DF	Sergei Gorlukovich	18 November 1961 (aged 34)	37	(Russia) Spartak Moscow
21	MF	Dmitri Khokhlov	22 December 1975 (aged 20)	0	(Russia) CSKA Moscow
22	GK	Sergei Ovchinnikov	10 November 1970 (aged 25)	3	(Russia) Lokomotiv Moscow

== Group D ==
=== Croatia ===
Coach: Miroslav Blažević

No.	Pos.	Player	Date of birth (age)	Caps	Club
1	GK	Dražen Ladić	1 January 1963 (aged 33)	25	Croatia Zagreb
2	DF	Nikola Jurčević	14 September 1966 (aged 29)	14	(Germany) SC Freiburg
3	DF	Robert Jarni	26 October 1968 (aged 27)	28	(Spain) Real Betis
4	DF	Igor Štimac	6 September 1967 (aged 28)	18	(England) Derby County
5	DF	Nikola Jerkan	8 December 1964 (aged 31)	22	(Spain) Oviedo
6	DF	Slaven Bilić	11 September 1968 (aged 27)	21	(England) West Ham United
7	MF	Aljoša Asanović	14 December 1965 (aged 30)	23	(Croatia) Hajduk Split
8	MF	Robert Prosinečki	12 January 1969 (aged 27)	30	(Spain) Barcelona
9	FW	Davor Šuker	1 January 1968 (aged 28)	22	(Spain) Sevilla
10	MF	Zvonimir Boban (captain)	8 October 1968 (aged 27)	23	(Italy) Milan
11	FW	Alen Bokšić	21 January 1970 (aged 26)	13	(Italy) Lazio
12	GK	Marijan Mrmić	6 May 1965 (aged 31)	5	(Croatia) Varteks Varaždin
13	FW	Mario Stanić	10 April 1972 (aged 24)	10	(Belgium) Club Brugge
14	MF	Zvonimir Soldo	2 November 1967 (aged 28)	13	Croatia Zagreb
15	DF	Dubravko Pavličić	28 November 1967 (aged 28)	18	(Spain) Hércules
16	MF	Mladen Mladenović	13 September 1964 (aged 31)	14	(Japan) Gamba Osaka
17	FW	Igor Pamić	19 November 1969 (aged 26)	3	(Croatia) Osijek
18	DF	Elvis Brajković	12 June 1969 (aged 26)	8	(Germany) 1860 Munich
19	FW	Goran Vlaović	7 August 1972 (aged 23)	11	(Italy) Padova
20	DF	Dario Šimić	12 November 1975 (aged 20)	3	Croatia Zagreb
21	FW	Igor Cvitanović	1 November 1970 (aged 25)	6	Croatia Zagreb
22	GK	Tonči Gabrić	11 November 1961 (aged 34)	4	(Croatia) Hajduk Split

=== Denmark ===
Coach: Richard Møller Nielsen

No.	Pos.	Player	Date of birth (age)	Caps	Club
1	GK	Peter Schmeichel	18 November 1963 (aged 32)	84	(England) Manchester United
2	DF	Thomas Helveg	24 June 1971 (aged 24)	13	(Italy) Udinese
3	DF	Marc Rieper	5 June 1968 (aged 28)	38	(England) West Ham United
4	DF	Lars Olsen	2 February 1961 (aged 35)	84	(Denmark) Brøndby
5	DF	Jes Høgh	7 May 1966 (aged 30)	21	(Turkey) Fenerbahçe
6	DF	Michael Schjønberg	19 January 1967 (aged 29)	13	(Denmark) Odense
7	MF	Brian Steen Nielsen	28 December 1968 (aged 27)	35	(Denmark) Odense
8	DF	Claus Thomsen	31 May 1970 (aged 26)	6	(England) Ipswich Town
9	FW	Mikkel Beck	12 May 1973 (aged 23)	9	(Germany) Fortuna Köln
10	MF	Michael Laudrup (captain)	15 June 1964 (aged 31)	88	(Spain) Real Madrid
11	FW	Brian Laudrup	22 February 1969 (aged 27)	63	(Scotland) Rangers
12	DF	Torben Piechnik	21 May 1963 (aged 33)	14	(Denmark) Aarhus
13	MF	Henrik Larsen	17 May 1966 (aged 30)	36	(Denmark) Lyngby
14	DF	Jens Risager	9 April 1971 (aged 25)	12	(Denmark) Brøndby
15	FW	Erik Bo Andersen	14 November 1970 (aged 25)	5	(Scotland) Rangers
16	GK	Lars Høgh	14 January 1959 (aged 37)	8	(Denmark) Odense
17	MF	Allan Nielsen	13 March 1971 (aged 25)	3	(Denmark) Brøndby
18	MF	Kim Vilfort	15 November 1962 (aged 33)	75	(Denmark) Brøndby
19	MF	Stig Tøfting	14 August 1969 (aged 26)	2	(Denmark) Aarhus
20	DF	Jacob Laursen	6 October 1971 (aged 24)	11	(Denmark) Silkeborg
21	FW	Søren Andersen	31 January 1970 (aged 26)	2	(Denmark) AaB
22	GK	Mogens Krogh	31 October 1963 (aged 32)	5	(Denmark) Brøndby

=== Portugal ===
Coach: António Oliveira

No.	Pos.	Player	Date of birth (age)	Caps	Club
1	GK	Vítor Baía (captain)	15 October 1969 (aged 26)	41	(Portugal) Porto
2	DF	Carlos Secretário	12 May 1970 (aged 26)	13	(Portugal) Porto
3	MF	Paulinho Santos	21 November 1970 (aged 25)	12	(Portugal) Porto
4	MF	Oceano	29 July 1962 (aged 33)	40	(Portugal) Sporting CP
5	DF	Fernando Couto	2 August 1969 (aged 26)	32	(Italy) Parma
6	MF	José Tavares	25 April 1966 (aged 30)	5	(Portugal) Boavista
7	MF	Vítor Paneira	16 February 1966 (aged 30)	44	(Portugal) Vitória de Guimarães
8	FW	João Pinto	19 August 1971 (aged 24)	24	(Portugal) Benfica
9	FW	Sá Pinto	10 October 1972 (aged 23)	10	(Portugal) Sporting CP
10	MF	Rui Costa	29 March 1972 (aged 24)	21	(Italy) Fiorentina
11	FW	Jorge Cadete	27 August 1968 (aged 27)	23	(Scotland) Celtic
12	GK	Alfredo Castro	5 October 1962 (aged 33)	3	(Portugal) Boavista
13	DF	Dimas	16 February 1969 (aged 27)	6	(Portugal) Benfica
14	MF	Pedro Barbosa	6 August 1970 (aged 25)	9	(Portugal) Sporting CP
15	FW	Domingos	2 January 1969 (aged 27)	27	(Portugal) Porto
16	DF	Hélder	21 March 1971 (aged 25)	19	(Portugal) Benfica
17	MF	Hugo Porfírio	28 September 1973 (aged 22)	4	(Portugal) União de Leiria
18	MF	António Folha	21 May 1971 (aged 25)	19	(Portugal) Porto
19	MF	Paulo Sousa	30 August 1970 (aged 25)	24	(Italy) Juventus
20	MF	Luís Figo	4 November 1972 (aged 23)	27	(Spain) Barcelona
21	DF	Paulo Madeira	6 September 1970 (aged 25)	12	(Portugal) Belenenses
22	GK	Rui Correia	22 October 1967 (aged 28)	1	(Portugal) Braga

=== Turkey ===
Coach: Fatih Terim

No.	Pos.	Player	Date of birth (age)	Caps	Club
1	GK	Adnan Erkan	15 January 1968 (aged 28)	1	(Turkey) Ankaragücü
2	DF	Recep Çetin	1 October 1965 (aged 30)	48	(Turkey) Beşiktaş
3	DF	Alpay Özalan	29 May 1973 (aged 23)	20	(Turkey) Beşiktaş
4	DF	Vedat İnceefe	1 April 1974 (aged 22)	2	(Turkey) Kardemir Karabükspor
5	MF	Tugay Kerimoğlu	24 August 1970 (aged 25)	38	(Turkey) Galatasaray
6	FW	Ertuğrul Sağlam	19 November 1969 (aged 26)	23	(Turkey) Beşiktaş
7	FW	Hami Mandıralı	20 July 1968 (aged 27)	37	(Turkey) Trabzonspor
8	DF	Ogün Temizkanoğlu	6 October 1969 (aged 26)	37	(Turkey) Trabzonspor
9	FW	Hakan Şükür	1 September 1971 (aged 24)	28	(Turkey) Galatasaray
10	MF	Oğuz Çetin (captain)	15 February 1963 (aged 33)	59	(Turkey) Fenerbahçe
11	MF	Orhan Çıkırıkçı	15 April 1967 (aged 29)	25	(Turkey) Trabzonspor
12	FW	Faruk Yiğit	15 April 1968 (aged 28)	7	(Turkey) Kocaelispor
13	DF	Rahim Zafer	25 January 1971 (aged 25)	3	(Turkey) Gençlerbirliği
14	FW	Saffet Sancaklı	27 February 1966 (aged 30)	13	(Turkey) Kocaelispor
15	MF	Tayfun Korkut	2 April 1974 (aged 22)	4	(Turkey) Fenerbahçe
16	MF	Sergen Yalçın	5 October 1972 (aged 23)	14	(Turkey) Beşiktaş
17	MF	Abdullah Ercan	8 December 1971 (aged 24)	25	(Turkey) Trabzonspor
18	FW	Arif Erdem	2 January 1972 (aged 24)	11	(Turkey) Galatasaray
19	MF	Tolunay Kafkas	31 March 1968 (aged 28)	19	(Turkey) Trabzonspor
20	DF	Bülent Korkmaz	24 November 1968 (aged 27)	47	(Turkey) Galatasaray
21	GK	Şanver Göymen	22 January 1967 (aged 29)	5	(Turkey) Altay
22	GK	Rüştü Reçber	10 May 1973 (aged 23)	16	(Turkey) Fenerbahçe
