= Blättler =

Blättler is a surname. Notable people with this surname include:

- Pierre Blättler (born 1966), retired Dutch footballer
- Rolf Blättler (1942–2024), Swiss footballer
- Tim Blättler (born 1994), Dutch professional footballer
- Tobias Blättler (born 1981), professional race car driver
