= Corminboeuf (surname) =

Corminboeuf or Corminbœuf is a surname. Notable people with the surname include:

- Alain Corminbœuf (born 1966), Swiss footballer
- Clémence Corminboeuf (born 1977), Swiss chemist
- Joël Corminbœuf (born 1964), Swiss footballer
- Pascal Corminboeuf (1944–2026), Swiss politician

== See also ==
- Corminboeuf, a municipality in Switzerland
