= Christian Stübi =

Swiss footballer (born 1970)

Personal information
- Date of birth: 10 April 1970 (age 56)
- Position: Midfielder

Senior career*
Years	Team	Apps	(Gls)
1988–1992	FC St. Gallen		
1992–1998	FC Schaffhausen		

Managerial career
- 2000–2010: FC Schaffhausen (director)
- 2007: FC Schaffhausen (caretaker manager)
- 2011–2017: FC St. Gallen (administration)
- * Club domestic league appearances and goals

Christian Stübi (born 10 April 1970) is a retired Swiss football midfielder.
