= Tim Blättler =

Dutch footballer (born 1994)

Personal information
- Date of birth: 4 September 1994 (age 32)
- Place of birth: Kerkrade, Netherlands
- Height: 1.80 m (5 ft 11 in)
- Position: Forward

Team information
- Current team: VV Chevremont

Youth career
- Roda JC
- KVC Oranje

Senior career*
Years	Team	Apps	(Gls)
- VV Chevremont
2013–2014	EVV	27	(9)
2014–2015	VV Chèvremont		
2015–2017	Jong Roda JC	3	(0)
2015–2017	Roda JC	19	(7)
2017–2018	VV Chevremont		
2018–2019	Wegberg-Beeck	4	(1)
2019–2020	Groene Ster		
2020–2021	KVC Oranje		
2021–	VV Chevremont		
- * Club domestic league appearances and goals as of 13:14, 29 July 2019 (UTC)

Tim Blättler (born 4 September 1994) is a Dutch professional footballer who plays for RKSV Groene Ster as a forward.

== Early and personal life ==
He is the nephew of former player Pierre Blättler, who also played for Roda JC. His younger brother Rick is also a footballer. His grandfather was a miner.

== Career ==
Blättler played youth football for Roda JC, joining the club at the age of six. He left to play for KVC Oranje, and he later played amateur football for VV Chèvremont and EVV. In May 2015 he had had a two-week trial period with Fortuna Sittard. He returned to Roda JC in June 2015, initially on an amateur basis. He made his debut for Roda JC in December 2015. At that time he was still working part-time in a sporting goods store.

Ahead of the 2019–20 season, Blättler joined RKSV Groene Ster. After a season at KVC Oranje in 2020–21, Blättler returned to his former club, VV Chevremont, in the summer 2021.
