= Daniel Fasel =

Swiss footballer (born 1967)

Personal information
- Date of birth: 3 May 1967 (age 59)
- Position: Defender

Senior career*
Years	Team	Apps	(Gls)
1986–1990	Neuchâtel Xamax		
1990–1901	FC Wettingen		
1991–1994	Neuchâtel Xamax		
1995–2000	Yverdon Sport FC		
- * Club domestic league appearances and goals

Daniel Fasel (born 3 May 1967) is a retired Swiss football defender.

== Honours ==
Neuchâtel Xamax

- Swiss Super Cup: 1988
