= Roberto Baldassari =

Swiss footballer (born 1972)

Personal information
- Date of birth: 31 December 1972 (age 53)
- Place of birth: Würenlos
- Position: Midfielder

Senior career*
Years	Team	Apps	(Gls)
1991–1992	FC Wettingen		
1992–1998	FC Zürich		
1998–2003	FC Aarau		
- * Club domestic league appearances and goals

Roberto Baldassari (born 31 December 1972) is a retired Swiss football midfielder.
