= Alain Vernier =

Swiss footballer (born 1968)

Personal information
- Date of birth: 9 February 1968 (age 58)
- Position: Defender

Senior career*
Years	Team	Apps	(Gls)
1987–1989	SR Delémont		
1989–1992	Neuchâtel Xamax		
1992–1993	FC Bulle		
1993–1994	FC St. Gallen		
1994–1997	Neuchâtel Xamax		
1998	FC Thun		
1998–2003	SR Delémont		
- * Club domestic league appearances and goals

Alain Vernier (born 9 February 1968) is a retired Swiss football defender.
