= Mirsad Baljić =

Bosnian footballer (born 1962)

Personal information
- Date of birth: 4 March 1962 (age 64)
- Place of birth: Sarajevo, FPR Yugoslavia
- Height: 1.85 m (6 ft 1 in)
- Position: Left-back

Youth career
- Sarajevo

Senior career*
Years	Team	Apps	(Gls)
1979–1988	Željezničar	187	(20)
1988–1992	Sion	126	(41)
1992–1993	Zürich	31	(8)
1993	Luzern	11	(1)
1994	Locarno	0	(0)
Total		355	(80)

International career
1984–1990	Yugoslavia	29	(2)
Medal record
Men's Football
Representing Yugoslavia
Olympic Games
Bronze medal – third place	1984 Los Angeles	Team
- * Club domestic league appearances and goals

Mirsad Baljić (born 4 March 1962) is a Bosnian former professional footballer who played as an offensive left-back.

He got his nickname Žvaka (chewing gum) for his constant use of chewing gum during matches.

== Club career ==
Baljić made his first football steps in hometown club Sarajevo's youth team before temporarily leaving football because of medical problems. When he returned, he went to city rivals Željezničar, and as one of their more talented youngsters, he got the opportunity to play in the first team. His league debut came in 1980 when he was aged 18. His biggest success at the club was reaching the UEFA Cup semi-finals in the 1984–85 season under the guidance of Ivica Osim.

In 1988, Baljić moved to Swiss side Sion and stayed there until 1992, before leaving to join Zürich. After two seasons there he left to Luzern. Baljić finished his career at Locarno in 1995.

== International career ==
Baljić played in the youth, under-21 and Olympic teams of Yugoslavia.

He made his senior debut for Yugoslavia in a March 1984 friendly game against Hungary and has earned a total of 29 caps, scoring 2 goals. Baljić was part of the UEFA Euro 1984 and 1990 FIFA World Cup Yugoslav squads. His final international was a June 1990 FIFA World Cup match against West Germany.

Yugoslav national team
Year	Apps	Goals
1984	4	0
1985	7	2
1986	5	0
1987	6	0
1988	2	0
1989	2	0
1990	3	0
Total	29	2

International caps by year

List of international goals scored by Mirsad Baljić
No.	Date	Venue	Opponent	Score	Result	Competition	Ref.
1	20 January 1985	Maharaja College Stadium, Kochi, India	Iran	1–0	3–1	Friendly	
2	20 January 1985	Maharaja College Stadium, Kochi, India	Iran	2–0	3–1	Friendly	

== Personal life ==
Baljić lives and works in Switzerland. His son Omar is also a footballer, and has played for the Swiss national youth teams.

== Honours ==
Sion

- Nationalliga A: 1991–92
- Swiss Cup: 1990–91

Yugoslavia

- Summer Olympics third place: 1984
