= Ronald Rothenbühler =

Swiss footballer (born 1971)

Personal information
- Date of birth: 15 August 1971 (age 55)
- Height: 1.70 m (5 ft 7 in)
- Position: Defender

Senior career*
Years	Team	Apps	(Gls)
1988–1992	Neuchâtel Xamax		
1992–1993	Delémont		
1993–1995	CS Chênois		
1995–1999	Étoile Carouge		
2000–2011	Fraser Park		
2001	Delémont		
2002–2003	Meyrin		
2004–2005	Terre Sainte		
- * Club domestic league appearances and goals

Ronald Rothenbühler (born 15 August 1971) is a Swiss former professional footballer who played as a defender.
