= Patrick Mäder =

Journalist and retired Swiss footballer

Personal information
- Date of birth: 27 February 1965 (age 61)
- Place of birth: Schaffhausen
- Position: Goalkeeper

Senior career*
| Years | Team | Apps | (Gls) |
| 1987–1992 | FC Baden | | |
| 1992–1994 | FC Zürich | | |
| 1994–1995 | FC Winterthur | | |
| 1995–1996 | FC Baden | | |
| 1996–1997 | FC Zürich | | |
- * Club domestic league appearances and goals

Patrick Mäder (born 27 February 1965) is a journalist at Blick and retired Swiss football goalkeeper.

== Career ==
Patrick Mäder played in the Swiss Super League in the position of goalkeeper between 1988 and 1997. Early in his career, he played for FC Baden in Regulation Groups B and A, before transferring to FC Zurich for the 1992/93 season. He played one season with FC Winterthur in 1994/95.

After retiring from football, he became a social researcher at IPSO before becoming a sports journalist. He was editor-in-chief of the sport at the news magazine Facts. As of September 2023, Patrick Mäder is the Deputy Head of Sport at Blick. He is also published in MSN, The Mining Journal, La Crosse Tribune and other publications.

Patrick is also an abstract painter.

== Family & Education ==
Born on February 27, 1965, in Schaffhausen, Patrick Mäder attended Schaffhausen Cantonal School. He began to play professional football in 1985. After retirement, he attended the University of Zurich graduating in 1997 with a degree in sociology, journalism and political science. He has two children and three grandchildren.
