= Roland Widmer =

Swiss footballer (born 1965)

Personal information
- Date of birth: 26 September 1965 (age 61)
- Place of birth: Luzern
- Position: Defender

Senior career*
| Years | Team | Apps | (Gls) |
| 1983–1988 | FC Luzern | | |
| 1988–1989 | Neuchâtel Xamax | | |
| 1990–1992 | FC Wettingen | | |
| 1992–1996 | FC Zürich | | |

International career
- Switzerland u-21

Managerial career
- 2019–: SC Kriens (coach)
- * Club domestic league appearances and goals

Roland Widmer (born 26 September 1965) is a retired Swiss football defender.

== Honours ==
Neuchâtel Xamax

- Swiss Super Cup: 1988
