= Ralph Heydecker =

Swiss footballer (born 1965)

Personal information
- Date of birth: 2 April 1965 (age 61)
- Place of birth: Schaffhausen
- Position: Midfielder

Senior career*
| Years | Team | Apps | (Gls) |
| 1985–1990 | FC Schaffhausen | | |
| 1990–1995 | FC Zürich | | |
| 1995–1998 | FC Schaffhausen | | |
- * Club domestic league appearances and goals

Ralph Heydecker (born 2 April 1965) is a retired Swiss football midfielder.
