= Roy Pagno =

Swiss footballer (born 1969)

Ivan Reimann
Personal information
- Date of birth: 5 November 1969 (age 56)
- Position: Midfielder

Senior career*
Years	Team	Apps	(Gls)
1989–1990	FC St. Gallen		
1990–1991	FC Schaffhausen		
1991–1992	FC Chur		
1992–2000	FC Schaffhausen		
- * Club domestic league appearances and goals

Roy Pagno (born 5 November 1969) is a retired Swiss football midfielder.
