= Milton (footballer) =

Brazilian footballer

Personal information
- Full name: Milton Luiz de Souza Filho
- Date of birth: 11 November 1961 (age 64)
- Place of birth: Rio de Janeiro, Brazil
- Position: Midfielder

Senior career*
| Years | Team | Apps | (Gls) |
| 1983–1985 | Serrano-RJ | | |
| 1985–1986 | Nacional-AM | | |
| 1986–1988 | Coritiba FC | | |
| 1988–1990 | Como | | |
| 1990–1991 | FC Chiasso | | |
| 1991–1993 | FC Zürich | | |
| 1993–1995 | FC Sion | | |
| 1995–1996 | FC St. Gallen | | |
| 1996–1998 | FC Sion | | |

International career
| 1987–1988 | Brazil | 5 | (0) |
| 1988 | Brazil Olympic | 6 | (0) |
- * Club domestic league appearances and goals

Milton Luiz de Souza Filho (born 11 November 1961), shortened to Milton, is a Brazilian footballer who played as a midfielder. He competed in the men's tournament at the 1988 Summer Olympics. He spent the majority of his club career, eight years, in Switzerland playing for four different clubs.

== Honours ==
=== Player ===
FC Sion

- Swiss Championship: 1996–97
- Swiss Cup: 1994–95, 1996–97
