= Alain Corminbœuf =

Swiss footballer (born 1966)

Personal information
- Date of birth: 8 July 1966 (age 60)
- Position: Defender

Senior career*
| Years | Team | Apps | (Gls) |
| 1991–1993 | FC Bulle | | |
- * Club domestic league appearances and goals

Alain Corminbœuf (born 8 July 1966) is a retired Swiss football defender.
