= Patrick Sylvestre =

Swiss footballer (born 1968)

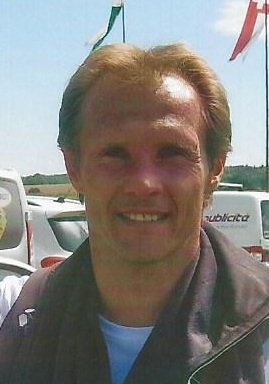

Personal information
- Date of birth: 1 September 1968 (age 58)
- Place of birth: Bure, Switzerland
- Height: 1.73 m (5 ft 8 in)
- Position: Defensive midfielder

Senior career*
Years	Team	Apps	(Gls)
1986–1988	La Chaux-de-Fonds	60	(2)
1988–1993	Lugano	162	(7)
1993–1996	Lausanne-Sport	50	(6)
1996–1998	Sion	32	(1)
Total		304	(16)

International career
1989-1994	Switzerland	11	(0)
- * Club domestic league appearances and goals

Patrick Sylvestre (born 1 September 1968, in Bure, Switzerland) is a retired Swiss football midfielder.

He made his debut for the Swiss national team in 1989 against Spain, and was capped 11 times. He was in the Swiss squad at the 1994 FIFA World Cup, but only played 7 minutes during the game against Romania. He was also in the roster for Euro 1996, but never played a game.

== Honours ==
- Swiss league champion 1997 with FC Sion
- Swiss Cup champion 1993 with FC Lugano
- Swiss Cup champion 1996 with FC Sion
- Swiss Cup champion 1997 with FC Sion
