= Haris Škoro =

Bosnian former footballer (born 1962)

Personal information
- Date of birth: September 2, 1962 (age 64)
- Place of birth: Vogošća, FPR Yugoslavia
- Height: 1.84 m (6 ft 0 in)
- Position: Striker

Youth career
- FK UNIS Vogošća

Senior career*
Years	Team	Apps	(Gls)
1981–1982	Bosna Visoko		
1982–1987	Željezničar	107	(27)
1987–1988	Dinamo Zagreb	28	(14)
1988–1991	Torino	87	(17)
1991–1995	Zürich	101	(15)
1995–1996	Baden		

International career
1985–1989	Yugoslavia	15	(4)
- * Club domestic league appearances and goals

Haris Škoro (born September 2, 1962) is a Bosnian former footballer who represented Yugoslavia at international level.

== Club career ==
He started playing football at hometown club FK Vogošća. After that, he left to NK Bosna Visoko for which he played for one season. He was spotted there by Željezničar scouts who wanted him to come and play for them. In 1982, he made his debut in Željezničar's blue shirt. Škoro played a little more than 100 games for the club. He was part of the team that reached the 1984-1985 UEFA Cup semifinals.

That same year, he made his debut for the Yugoslavia national team as well. He has collected 15 caps in following years. He also scored four goals and played in the 1990 FIFA World Cup qualifiers for Yugoslavia.

In 1987, he moved to Dinamo Zagreb as Miroslav Blažević's biggest wish at the time. He made 30 appearances in the league and scored 14 goals. After only one season in Dinamo, he went to Serie A club Torino. He stayed there for three seasons and played alongside Torino stars like Rafael Martín Vázquez, Luis Müller and Francesco Romano.

He moved to Switzerland in 1992. as he has signed a contract with FC Zürich. He played for this Swiss club until 1995. After that, he played for FC Baden before he finally ended his career in 1996.

== International career ==
Škoro made his debut for Yugoslavia in a September 1985 World Cup qualification match against East Germany in which he scored his country's only goals and has earned a total of 15 caps, scoring 4 goals. He scored against England in a friendly at Wembley on December 13, 1989, a game which would see England win 2-1 and was his final international.

== International goals ==
Scores and results table. Yugoslavia's goal tally first:

#	Date	Venue	Opponent	Score	Result	Competition
1	28 September 1985	JNA Stadium, Belgrade, Yugoslavia	East Germany	1–2	1–2	1986 FIFA World Cup qualification
2	11 May 1986	Ruhrstadion, Bochum, West Germany	West Germany	1–0	1–1	Friendly
3	19 May 1986	Heysel-Stadion, Brussels, Belgium	Belgium	1–0	3–1	Friendly
4	13 December 1989	Wembley Stadium, London, England	England	1–1	1–2	Friendly

== Personal life ==
He lives in Switzerland.
