= Pierre Blättler =

Dutch footballer

Personal information
- Date of birth: 3 February 1966 (age 60)
- Place of birth: Kerkrade, Netherlands
- Position: Midfielder

Senior career*
| Years | Team | Apps | (Gls) |
| 1984–1990 | Roda JC | 106 | (9) |
| 1991–1993 | St. Gallen | | |
| 1993–1994 | FC Zürich | 28 | (3) |
| 1994–1995 | Baden | | |
| 1995–1997 | Germania Teveren | | |

International career
| 1987-1988 | Netherlands U-21 | 4 | (0) |
- * Club domestic league appearances and goals

Pierre Blättler (born 3 February 1966) is a Dutch retired football midfielder. He played for the Netherlands national under-21 football team.

He is the uncle of Tim Blättler.
