= Mario Kägi =

Swiss footballer (born 1967)

Personal information
- Date of birth: 24 February 1967 (age 59)
- Place of birth: Möhlin
- Position: Midfielder

Senior career*
Years	Team	Apps	(Gls)
1987–1991	BSC Old Boys		
1991–1992	FC La Chaux-de-Fonds		
1992–1995	FC Zürich		
1995–1996	Neuchâtel Xamax		
- * Club domestic league appearances and goals

Mario Kägi (born 24 February 1967) is a retired Swiss football midfielder.
