= Reto Gertschen =

Swiss footballer (born 1965)

Personal information
- Date of birth: 7 February 1965 (age 61)
- Place of birth: Bern, Switzerland
- Height: 1.87 m (6 ft 2 in)
- Position: Midfielder

Senior career*
Years	Team	Apps	(Gls)
1982–1987	Young Boys	56	(3)
1990–1993	Lausanne-Sport	74	(8)
1990–1993	Sion	80	(13)
1993	Servette	9	(2)
1993–1995	St. Gallen	41	(8)
1995–1996	Young Boys	16	(0)
1996–2001	SC Bümpliz 78		

International career
1990	Switzerland	1	(0)

Managerial career
- 2023: Switzerland women
- * Club domestic league appearances and goals

Reto Gertschen (born 7 February 1965) is a Swiss former professional footballer who played as a midfielder. He has managed the Switzerland women's national team.

== Club career ==
Gertschen began his professional football career playing for Young Boys from 1982 to 1987, with which he won the Swiss Super League in 1986 and the Swiss cup the next year. He later transferred to Lausanne-Sport until 1990. From 1990 to 1993 Gertschen played for Sion where he won the Swiss cup in 1991 and the Swiss league title in 1992. In 1993 he left the club and transferred to Servette, where he departed in 1995. Later on he played for St. Gallen, BSC Young Boys and ended his career with SC Bümpliz 78.

== International career ==
Gertschen earned one cap for the Switzerland national team.

== Coaching career ==
Gertschen was the manager of the Switzerland women's national team in 2023.

== Honours ==
Young Boys

- Swiss Super League: 1985–86
- Swiss Cup: 1986–87
- Swiss Super Cup: 1986

Sion

- Swiss Super League: 1990–91
- Swiss Cup: 1991–92
