= Herbert Waas =

German footballer (born 1963)

Personal information
- Date of birth: 8 September 1963 (age 63)
- Place of birth: Passau, West-Germany
- Height: 1.76 m (5 ft 9 in)
- Position: Striker

Senior career*
Years	Team	Apps	(Gls)
1981–1982	1860 Munich	35	(11)
1982–1989	Bayer Leverkusen	209	(72)
1989–1991	Bologna	52	(6)
1991–1992	Hamburger SV	33	(2)
1992–1995	FC Zürich	69	(19)
1995	Dynamo Dresden	5	(0)
Total		403	(110)

International career
1983–1988	West Germany U-21	11	(2)
1983–1988	West Germany	11	(1)
- * Club domestic league appearances and goals

Herbert Waas (born 8 September 1963) is a German former footballer who played as a striker, and won 11 caps for West Germany, scoring once.

== Club career ==
Waas spent the most prolific time of his career with Bayer Leverkusen, with whom he won the UEFA Cup in 1988. Waas was the club's first German international, and Bild named him in a list of the club's top 50 all-time players. In the Bundesliga he scored 74 goals in 247 matches.

At the end of Waas' stint with Bayer Leverkusen, new manager Jürgen Gelsdorf froze him out of the playing squad as the club put him up for sale in a cost-cutting move.

== International career ==
Waas made his debut for the West Germany national team on 6 July 1983 in a 4–2 friendly home win against Luxembourg. He scored his first and final goal in a 2–2 home friendly draw against Spain three years later.

== Career statistics ==
Score and result list West Germany's goal tally first, score column indicates score after Waas goal.

International goal scored by Herbert Waas
No.	Date	Venue	Opponent	Score	Result	Competition
1	15 October 1986	Niedersachsenstadion, Hannover, West Germany	Spain	1–1	2–2	Friendly
