= David Sesa =

Swiss footballer (born 1973)

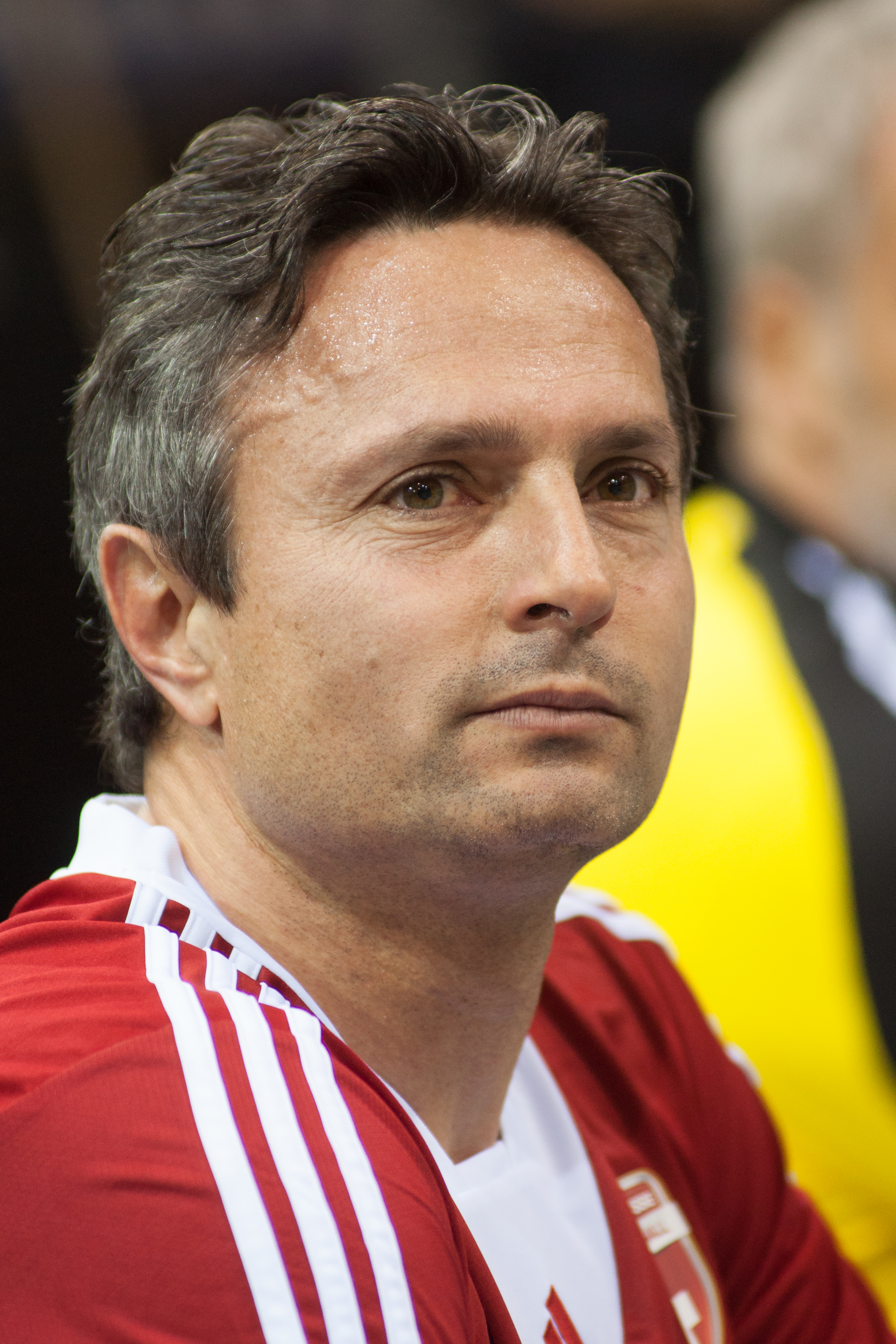
- Sesa in 2014

Personal information
- Date of birth: 10 July 1973 (age 53)
- Place of birth: Zürich, Switzerland
- Height: 1.74 m (5 ft 9 in)
- Position: Winger

Team information
- Current team: FC Schaffhausen (Manager)

Senior career*
Years	Team	Apps	(Gls)
1991–1993	Zürich	30	(2)
1993–1994	Baden	27	(22)
1994–1998	Servette	129	(32)
1998–2000	Lecce	59	(14)
2000–2004	Napoli	76	(4)
2004	Aarau	3	(0)
2005	Palazzolo	12	(2)
2005–2008	SPAL	76	(20)
2008–2010	Rovigo	24	(2)

International career
1996–2002	Switzerland	36	(1)

Managerial career
- 2012–2014: Wohlen
- 2016–2017: Anderlecht (assistant)
- 2019–2020: Al Ahly (assistant)
- 2022: Bellinzona
- 2022–2025: Rapperswil-Jona
- 2026–: FC Schaffhausen
- * Club domestic league appearances and goals

David Sesa (born 10 July 1973) is a Swiss football manager and former player who is the manager of FC Schaffhausen. A midfielder or forward, he made 36 appearances for the Switzerland national team.

== Club career ==
Sesa started his career in Switzerland playing for Zürich and Baden before having his breakthrough during his stint at Servette FC. In 1998, he moved to Italy to join Serie B club Lecce, winning promotion to Serie A on his first season. His second season in Italy gained him interest from Napoli, who signed him for 16 billion Italian lira in 2000. His stay at Napoli however turned out to be rather unimpressive, and he suffered relegation with his club on his first season with the Azzurri. He was released by Napoli in 2004, after the club folded due to financial troubles, and returned to Switzerland to play for Aarau. In 2005, he returned to Italy, playing in the lower professional tiers with Palazzolo, SPAL and Rovigo before retiring in 2010.

== International career ==
Sesa has played for the Switzerland national team and was part of the squad at the 1996 UEFA European Championship.

== Style of play ==
Sesa was capable of playing as a right winger or as a second striker, and was considered a fast and elegant forward, despite his lack of particularly notable physical attributes. He was also an accurate free kick taker.

== Managerial career ==
Sesa took his first head coaching job in 2012 as new boss of Swiss Challenge League club Wohlen. He was removed from managerial duties in February 2014 due to poor results and replaced with Ciriaco Sforza.

In the summer 2016, Sesa became the assistant manager of his former teammate, René Weiler, at Belgian club Anderlecht. Weiler was fired on 18 September 2017 but Sesa stayed at the club to assist interim manager Nicolás Frutos. However, his contract was terminated in the beginning of the following month.

On 31 August 2019, Sesa was appointed assistant manager of Weiler once again, this time at Egyptian club Al Ahly.

On 1 October 2020, Sesa departed Al Ahly following the departure of Weiler.

On 21 June 2022, he was announced as the new head coach of Bellinzona in their first season back in the Swiss Challenge League, after achieving promotion in the previous season from the Swiss Promotion League. On 22 August 2022, after only five games with Bellinzona, he resigned from his post.

In January 2026, FC Schaffhausen hired him as their new manager.
