= Ercüment Şahin =

Footballer (born 1968)

Personal information
- Date of birth: 1 October 1968 (age 58)
- Place of birth: Bülach, Switzerland
- Height: 1.77 m (5 ft 10 in)
- Position: Striker

Youth career
- 1980–1984: Bülach
- 1984–1988: Zürich

Senior career*
Years	Team	Apps	(Gls)
1988–1991	Zürich	86	(43)
1991–1993	Chiasso	48	(30)
1993–1995	Zürich	60	(16)
1995–1997	Bursaspor	42	(14)
1996–1997	→Altay (loan)	20	(1)
1997–2000	Vanspor	59	(18)
2000–2001	Konyaspor	49	(21)
2001–2002	Sarıyer	11	(2)

International career
1996	Turkey	1	(0)

Managerial career
- 2004–2005: Zürich U21 (assistant)
- 2005–2007: Dardanelspor (assistant)
- 2007–2008: İzmirspor (assistant)
- 2007–2008: İnegölspor (assistant)
- 2008–2009: Eskişehirspor (assistant)
- 2009–2010: Kuşadası Esnafspor
- 2010–2011: Kayseri Erciyesspor (assistant)
- 2012–2013: TKİ Tavşanlı Linyitspor (assistant)
- 2014–2015: Orduspor (assistant)
- 2016–2017: Aarau (assistant)
- 2016–2017: Wil (assistant)
- 2017–: Zürich U17
- * Club domestic league appearances and goals

Ercüment Şahin (Turkish pronunciation: [æɾ'dʒy'mænt ʃa'hin]; born 1 October 1968) is a professional football manager and former player who manages FC Zürich U17s. Born in Switzerland, he made one appearance for the Turkey national team.

== Club career ==
A striker, Ercüment began his career at his local club FC Zürich, where he became one of their top scorers. He had a brief stint at Chiasso. In 1995 he continued his career at Bursaspor, becoming a cult hero at the club. He thereafter played for Vanspor, Konyaspor and Sarıyer before retiring and moving on to management.

== International career ==
Born in Switzerland to Turkish parents, Ercüment made one appearance with the Turkey national team in a 2–0 friendly win over Moldova on 14 August 1996.
