= Marco Grassi =

Swiss footballer (born 1968)

Personal information
- Date of birth: 8 August 1968 (age 58)
- Place of birth: Chiasso, Switzerland
- Height: 1.89 m (6 ft 2 in)
- Position: Centre forward

Youth career
- 1977–1984: Chiasso
- 1984–1987: SC Zug

Senior career*
Years	Team	Apps	(Gls)
1987–1989	SC Zug	49	(15)
1989–1990	Zürich	30	(10)
1990–1991	Chiasso	18	(10)
1991–1993	Zürich	59	(21)
1994	Servette	13	(9)
1994–1996	Rennes	55	(26)
1996–1997	Monaco	12	(0)
1997	Sion	10	(4)
1997–1998	Cannes	18	(6)
1998–1999	Lyon	24	(6)
1999–2000	Nice	21	(3)
Total		309	(110)

International career
1993–1998	Switzerland	31	(3)
- * Club domestic league appearances and goals

Marco Grassi (born 8 August 1968) is a Swiss former professional footballer, who played as a centre forward. He was part of the Switzerland national team squads at the 1994 World Cup and at the UEFA Euro 1996.

== Club career ==
Grassi was born in Chiasso.

During his career, spent entirely in Switzerland and France, Grassi represented SC Zug, FC Chiasso, FC Zürich, Servette FC, Stade Rennais, AS Monaco, FC Sion, AS Cannes, Olympique Lyonnais and OGC Nice. At Monaco, he was part of the side that won the 1996-97 Ligue 1 title, making 12 appearances in the process.

As an expatriate, his best years were with Rennes, scoring 15 and 11 times respectively, as the club had just returned to the first division in his first year, proceeding to qualify for the UEFA Intertoto Cup in the second.

Grassi retired in 2000, at nearly 32, with French second division's Nice. Six years later, he became president of his very first club, hometown Chiasso.

== International career ==
For Switzerland, Grassi gained 31 international caps, scoring three goals, his debut coming in 1993; always as a backup, he participated at 1994 FIFA World Cup (one match) and UEFA Euro 1996 (two).
