= 1998 UEFA European Under-16 Championship squads =

Below are the rosters for the EFA European Under-16 Football Championship 1998 tournament in Scotland.

== Group A ==
=== Denmark ===
Head coach:

=== Greece ===
Head coach:

=== Iceland ===
Head coach:

=== Sweden ===
Head coach:

== Group B ==
=== Italy ===
Head coach:

=== Liechtenstein ===
Head coach:

=== Norway ===
Head coach:

No.	Pos.	Player	Date of birth (age)	Caps	Goals	Club
	MF	Magnus Amundsen	4 March 1981 (aged 17)			(Norwegian Football Federation) Fredrikstad
	GK	Kristian Dolmen	7 February 1981 (aged 17)			(Norwegian Football Federation) Aalesund
	MF	Eivind Ellingsen	29 January 1981 (aged 17)			(Norwegian Football Federation) Hana
	DF	Terje Flugheim	9 May 1981 (aged 16)			(Norwegian Football Federation) Sogndal
	MF	Morten Hagh	4 September 1981 (aged 16)			(Norwegian Football Federation) Mo
	MF	André Hanssen	31 January 1981 (aged 17)			(Norwegian Football Federation) Skjervøy
	DF	Andreas Heggelund	2 March 1981 (aged 17)			(Norwegian Football Federation) Lyn
	FW	Espen Hoff	20 November 1981 (aged 16)			(Norwegian Football Federation) Larvik Turn
	MF	Thomas Holm	19 February 1981 (aged 17)			(Norwegian Football Federation) Vålerenga
	DF	Patrick Holtet	2 April 1981 (aged 17)			(Norwegian Football Federation) Kongsvinger
	DF	Kjetil Holvik	23 January 1981 (aged 17)			(Norwegian Football Federation) Måløy
	DF	Azar Karadas	9 August 1981 (aged 16)			(Norwegian Football Federation) Eid
	GK	Per Morten Kristiansen	14 July 1981 (aged 16)			(Norwegian Football Federation) Fredrikstad
	MF	Stian Kristoffersen	9 July 1981 (aged 16)			(Norwegian Football Federation) Skeid
	FW	Trond Fredrik Ludvigsen	22 June 1982 (aged 15)			(Norwegian Football Federation) Alta
	DF	Kristoffer Paulsen Vatshaug	3 June 1981 (aged 16)			(Norwegian Football Federation) Steinkjer
	MF	Glenn Sagdahl	4 January 1981 (aged 17)			(Norwegian Football Federation) Langevåg
	MF	Kim Solberg	19 February 1981 (aged 17)			(Norwegian Football Federation) Ski

=== Portugal ===
Head coach:

== Group C ==
=== Republic of Ireland ===
Head coach: Brian Kerr

No.	Pos.	Player	Date of birth (age)	Caps	Goals	Club
1	GK	Joe Murphy	21 August 1981 (aged 16)			(The Football Association) Tranmere Rovers
2	DF	John Thompson	12 October 1981 (aged 16)			(Football Association of Ireland) Home Farm
4	DF	Keith Foy	30 December 1981 (aged 16)			(The Football Association) Nottingham Forest
6	DF	Jim Goodwin	20 November 1981 (aged 16)			(Scottish Football Association) Celtic
5	DF	John O'Shea	30 April 1981 (aged 16)			(Football Association of Ireland) Waterford Bohemians
17	MF	Andy Reid	29 July 1982 (aged 15)			(The Football Association) Nottingham Forest
10	MF	Shaun Byrne	21 January 1981 (aged 17)			(The Football Association) West Ham United
14	MF	Brendan McGill	22 March 1981 (aged 17)			(Football Association of Ireland) Rivervalley Rangers
11	FW	David McMahon	17 January 1981 (aged 17)			(The Football Association) Newcastle United
9	MF	Liam Miller	13 February 1981 (aged 17)			(Scottish Football Association) Celtic
15	FW	Graham Barrett	6 October 1981 (aged 16)			(The Football Association) Arsenal
13	DF	Dessie Byrne	14 October 1981 (aged 16)			(Football Association of Ireland) Cherry Orchard
12	MF	Jonathan Douglas	22 November 1981 (aged 16)			(Football Association of Ireland) Monaghan United
18	MF	David Warren	28 February 1981 (aged 17)			(Football Association of Ireland) Mayfield
7	DF	Brian O'Callaghan	24 February 1981 (aged 17)			(Football Association of Ireland) Pike Rovers
3	DF	Ian Rossiter	25 February 1981 (aged 17)			(Football Association of Ireland) Galway United
8	MF	Kevin Grogan	15 November 1981 (aged 16)			(The Football Association) Manchester United
16	GK	David Madden	28 February 1981 (aged 17)			(Football Association of Ireland) Tramore Athletic

=== Scotland ===
Head coach:

=== Spain ===
Head coach:

== Group D ==
=== Croatia ===
Head coach:

=== Israel ===
Head coach:

=== Russia ===
Head coach: Aleksandr Kuznetsov

No.	Pos.	Player	Date of birth (age)	Caps	Goals	Club
	GK	Veniamin Mandrykin	30 August 1981 (aged 16)			(Russian Football Union) Alania Vladikavkaz
	GK	Stanislav Khoteyev	7 March 1981 (aged 17)			(Russian Football Union) Lokomotiv Moscow
	DF	Semyon Semenenko	9 July 1981 (aged 16)			(Russian Football Union) Lokomotiv Moscow
	DF	Oleg Kuzmin	9 May 1981 (aged 16)			(Russian Football Union) Spartak Moscow
	DF	Ivan Telyatnikov	29 April 1981 (aged 16)			(Russian Football Union) Chkalovets Novosibirsk
	DF	Aleksandr Klyuyev	3 January 1981 (aged 17)			(Russian Football Union) Chernomorets Novorossiysk
	DF	Kirill Novikov	14 January 1981 (aged 17)			(Russian Football Union) Dynamo Moscow
	DF	Konstantin Lobov	2 May 1981 (aged 16)			(Russian Football Union) Smena Saint Petersburg
	DF	Roman Romanov	5 February 1981 (aged 17)			(Russian Football Union) DYuSSh Volzhsky
	MF	Aleksandr Gorin	7 January 1981 (aged 17)			(Russian Football Union) DYuSSh Voronezh
	MF	Alan Kusov	11 August 1981 (aged 16)			(Russian Football Union) Alania Vladikavkaz
	MF	Ruslan Pimenov	25 November 1981 (aged 16)			(Russian Football Union) Torpedo Moscow
	MF	Pavel Khramov	19 March 1981 (aged 17)			(Russian Football Union) CSKA Moscow
	MF	Anatoli Malkov	8 July 1981 (aged 16)			(Russian Football Union) DYuSSh Volgograd
	FW	Yevgeni Zinovyev	15 June 1981 (aged 16)			(Russian Football Union) Chkalovets Novosibirsk
	FW	Alan Sakiyev	2 August 1981 (aged 16)			(Russian Football Union) Alania Vladikavkaz
	FW	Aleksandr Shchipkov	6 April 1981 (aged 17)			(Russian Football Union) Spartak Moscow
	FW	Sergei Gorokhov	12 November 1981 (aged 16)			(Russian Football Union) Alania Vladikavkaz

=== Ukraine ===
Head coach: (Ukraine) Anatoliy Buznyk

No.	Pos.	Player	Date of birth (age)	Caps	Goals	Club
1	GK	Andriy Kolodyuk	20 January 1981 (aged 17)			(Ukrainian Association of Football) Dynamo Kyiv
2	DF	Denys Kucher	19 July 1981 (aged 16)			(German Football Association) Borussia Mönchengladbach
3	DF	Andriy Smalko	22 January 1981 (aged 17)			(Ukrainian Association of Football) Borysfen Boryspil
4	DF	Vitaliy Komarnytskyi	2 August 1981 (aged 16)			(Ukrainian Association of Football) Nyva Vinnytsia
5	MF	Ruslan Bidnenko	20 July 1981 (aged 16)			(Ukrainian Association of Football) Borysfen Boryspil
6	MF	Dmytro Kondratovych	24 June 1981 (aged 16)			(Ukrainian Association of Football) Dnipro Dnipropetrovsk
7	MF	Ruslan Valeyev	31 October 1981 (aged 16)			(German Football Association) Borussia Mönchengladbach
8	FW	Serhiy Levchenko	3 January 1981 (aged 17)			(German Football Association) Borussia Mönchengladbach
9	FW	Andriy Herasymenko	8 January 1981 (aged 17)			(Ukrainian Association of Football) Dynamo Kyiv
10	MF	Oleksandr Batrachenko	9 February 1981 (aged 17)			(Ukrainian Association of Football) Metalurh Zaporizhia
11	DF	Bohdan Shershun	14 May 1981 (aged 16)			(Ukrainian Association of Football) Dnipro Dnipropetrovsk
12	MF	Ihor Bendovskyi	6 October 1981 (aged 16)			(German Football Association) Borussia Dortmund
13	MF	Andriy Matveyev	6 May 1981 (aged 16)			(Ukrainian Association of Football) Dnipro Dnipropetrovsk
14	DF	Serhiy Khistyev	30 June 1981 (aged 16)			(Ukrainian Association of Football) Dynamo Kyiv
15	MF	Yaroslav Skydan	23 October 1981 (aged 16)			(Ukrainian Association of Football) Zorya Luhansk
16	MF	Roman Popekhin	7 January 1981 (aged 17)			(Ukrainian Association of Football) Avanhard Rovenky
