= 1992–93 FC Basel season =

FC Basel
1992–93 season
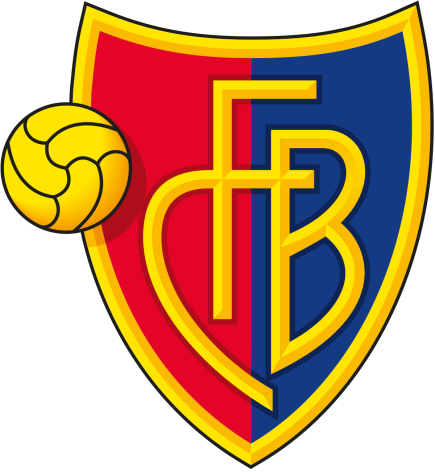
- Club president: Charles Röthlisberger until March 1993; Peter Epting from March 1993
- Head coach: Friedel Rausch
- Ground: St. Jakob Stadium, Basel
- Nationalliga B: Qualifying Phase 2nd of 12
- Promotion/relegation round: 4th of 8
- 1992–93 Swiss Cup: Quarterfinal
- Top goalscorer: Qualifying Phase; André Sitek (20); Promotion Phase; Frédéric Chassot (9)
- Highest home attendance: 34,000 on 24 March 1993 vs Grasshopper Club and on 24 April vs Luzern
- Lowest home attendance: 2,300 on 12 June vs SR Delémont
- Average home league attendance: 8,450

The Fussball Club Basel 1893 1992–93 season was their 100th anniversary season since the club's foundation. Peter Epting took over as the club's chairman that season from Charles Röthlisberger at the Annual General Meeting in March 1993. FC Basel played their home games in the St. Jakob Stadium. Following their relegation in the 1987–88 season this was their fifth season in the second tier of Swiss football.

== Overview ==
=== Pre-season ===
Friedel Rausch was appointed as new trainer, following Karl Odermatt and Bruno Rahmen. The duo had taken over ad interim after Ernst-August Künnecke had been sacked toward the end of the previous season. After missing promotion during the last four seasons, the club's repeated priority aim was to return to the top flight of Swiss football.

A number of players left the squad. Robert Kok, who had only been with the club the previous season, retired from active football. Three players moved on to Germany; Mourad Bounoua transferred to TuS Celle, Maximilian Heidenreich and Thomas Schweizer both moved on to SC Freiburg. Other players transferred within the Swiss League, Walter Bernhard transferred to Fribourg, Gilbert Epars transferred to Urania Genève Sport and Boris Mancastroppa to Schaffhausen. A few other players stepped shorter, ending their professional careers and continuing as amateurs with local clubs; Miodrag Đurđević went to SG Lörrach-Stetten, Martin Thalmann to FC Riehen and Vittorio Gottardi to SC Dornach. Both Roger Glanzmann and Rocco Verrelli left the club because their contracts were not prolonged, but both also continued as amateurs.

In the other direction Christian Reinwald joined from Chur as the new second goalkeeper. Then there were two transfers from Germany, Dirk Lellek transferred in from VfL Osnabrück and Ørjan Berg transferred in from 1860 Munich. Within the Swiss League, Mario Uccella joined from Winterthur, Marco Walker from Lugano and Pierre-André Schürmann from Lausanne-Sport. Two players joined from Xamax, Admir Smajić transferred in and Frédéric Chassot on loan. Patrick Rahmen returned to his club of origin from Young Boys and youngster Gaetano Giallanza signed his first professional contract, coming from Old Boys. Two other youngsters advanced from Basel's youth team, Pasquale D'Ambrosio and Cedric Jakob.

=== Domestic league ===
The 24 teams in the Nationalliga B were divided into two groups, an East and a West group. Both groups would first play a qualification round. Then in the second stage the tops six teams of each group and the last four teams of the Nationalliga A would play a promotion/relegation round, also divided into two separate groups. The top two teams in each of these groups would play in the top flight the next season. Basel were assigned to the West group, together with local rivals Old Boys. In the two local duals, Basel won both games and both with 3–0. Basel ended the Qualifying Phase in second position in the league table. In the 22 matches Basel totaled 36 points with 16 victories, four draws and two defeats. The team scored 54 goals and conceded only 10.

Basel thus qualified for the promotion stage and were assigned to group A. Further teams assigned to this group from the Nationalliga B were Delémont, Chênois, Luzern, Locarno and Wil. Assigned to this group and fighting against relegation from the Nationalliga A were Bulle and Grasshopper Club. Basel ended the promotion stage in a very disappointing fourth position in the league table. The 14 matches resulted in seven victories, four draws and three defeats with 18 points, scoring 25, conceding 17 goals. Therefore, Basel missed promotion again.

=== Swiss Cup ===
Basel entered the 1992–93 Swiss Cup in the second round. Here they were drawn away from home against lower-tier local team FC Baudepartement Basel. André Sitek scored a hat-trick between the 12th and the 31st minute as Basel won 6–0 to advance to the next round. In the third round FCB were drawn at home to local rivals Old Boys and this was won 4–0. Basel were drawn away against lower-tier SC Young Fellows Juventus in the fourth round and this was won 3–0. In the fifth round FCB were again drawn at home, also against a lower-tier team, FC Savièse. All four of these games had been won without the team conceding a single goal. However, in the quarterfinals Basel played at home against higher-tier Xamax. Because this match ended with a 2–3 defeat they were eliminated from the competition. Xamax were defeated in the semi-final by Lugano, who went on to win the final 4–1 against Grasshopper Club.

== Players ==
Note: Flags indicate national team as defined under FIFA eligibility rules; some limited exceptions apply. Players may hold more than one non-FIFA nationality.

No.	Pos.	Nation	Player
—	GK	SUI	Thomas Grüter
—	GK	SUI	Christian Reinwald (from Chur)
—	DF	SUI	Olivier Bauer
—	DF	SUI	Reto Baumgartner
—	DF	SUI	Massimo Ceccaroni
—	DF	SUI	Thomas Karrer
—	DF	GER	Dirk Lellek (from VfL Osnabrück)
—	DF	SUI	Micha Rahmen
—	DF	ITA	Mario Uccella (from Winterthur)
—	DF	SUI	Marco Walker (from Lugano)
—	MF	NOR	Ørjan Berg (from 1860 Munich)
—	MF	SUI	Martin Jeitziner
—	MF	SUI	Adrian Jenzer

No.	Pos.	Nation	Player
—	MF	SUI	Christian Marcolli
—	MF	SUI	Pierre-André Schürmann (from Lausanne-Sport)
—	MF	BIH	Admir Smajić (from Xamax)
—	MF	SUI	Andreas Steiner
—	MF	GER	Manfred Wagner
—	FW	SUI	Frédéric Chassot (on loan from Neuchâtel Xamax)
—	FW	ITA	Gaetano Giallanza (from Old Boys)
—	FW	SUI	Patrick Rahmen (from Young Boys)
—	FW	NED	André Sitek
—	FW	GER	Frank Wittmann
—	FW	SUI	Ruedi Zbinden
—		SUI	Pasquale D'Ambrosio
—		SUI	Cedric Jakob
—		SUI	Mathias Walther

Players who left the squad

Note: Flags indicate national team as defined under FIFA eligibility rules; some limited exceptions apply. Players may hold more than one non-FIFA nationality.

No.	Pos.	Nation	Player
—	GK	SUI	Roger Glanzmann
—	DF	SUI	Walter Bernhard (to Fribourg)
—	DF	BIH	Miodrag Đurđević (to SG Lörrach-Stetten)
—	DF	SUI	Martin Thalmann (to FC Riehen)
—	MF	FRA	Mourad Bounoua (to TuS Celle)
—	MF	SUI	Gilbert Epars (to Urania Genève Sport)

No.	Pos.	Nation	Player
—	MF	ITA	Vittorio Gottardi (to SC Dornach)
—	MF	GER	Maximilian Heidenreich (to SC Freiburg)
—	MF	ITA	Boris Mancastroppa (to Schaffhausen)
—	FW	NED	Robert Kok (retired)
—	MF	GER	Thomas Schweizer (to SC Freiburg)
—		SUI	Rocco Verrelli

== Results ==
Legend

Win Draw Loss Postponed

=== Friendly matches ===
==== Pre-season ====
29 June 1992 Pre-season; Exhibition game	SC Freiburg (Germany)	1–0	(Switzerland) Basel	Schliechtstadion, Lenzkirch, Germany
	Schmidt 79' (1:0)	FCB summary		Attendance: 600
Note: This Exhibition game was arranged due to the transfers of Walter Bernhard and Maximilian Heidenreich to SCF from FCB

2 July 1992 Uhrencup semi-final	Basel (Switzerland)	1–6	(Switzerland) Zürich	Stadion Brühl, Grenchen
19:30	Jeitziner (yellow card) 40'; Sitek 49' (1:3); Jeitziner (penalty missed) 90′	FCZ summary FCB summary	14' (0:1) Škoro; 24' (0:2) Škoro; 29' (0:3) Baljić; (yellow card) 61' Germann; 67' (1:4) Baljić; 74' (1:5) Kägi; 86' (1:6) Kägi	Attendance: 600; Referee: (Switzerland) Dieter Schoch (Attiswil)
Note: For various reasons, the players Baumgartner, Karrer, Marcolli, Micha Rahmen, Wagner, Walther and Zbinden were missing from the FCB squad, as were Casamento, Grassi and Milton from the FCZ squad. 90th minute, FCZ goalkeeper Patrick Mäder held the penalty-kick from Jeitziner.

4 July 1992 Uhrencup third place	Grenchen (Switzerland)	0–2	(Switzerland) Basel	Stadion Brühl, Grenchen
17:00		FCB summary	6' (0:1) Sitek; 44' (pen. 0:2) Sitek	Attendance: 700; Referee: (Switzerland) Hans Müller (Bern)
Note: The Uhrencup is a former club football tournament that was held annually in Grenchen in Switzerland. This was the match for third place. Grenchen were without Sven Christ, Moser, Wenger, and Lanz (all injured); Basel were without Zbinden, Marcoll, Bauer, and Wagner (all injured), as well as Mischa Rahmen (who underwent groin surgery). The pitch was slippery after heavy rain showers midway through the first half.

8 July 1992 Sempione-Cup semi-final	Basel (Switzerland)	5–3	(Switzerland) Schaffhausen	Moos, Balsthal
19:30	Sitek 16' (1:0); Sitek 33' (2:1); Baumgartner 43' (3:1); P. Rahmen (yellow card) 49'; P. Rahmen 55' (4:1); Sitek 65' (5:1)	FCB summary	33' (1:1) Rubli; (yellow card) 43' Ziltert; 70' (5:2) Engesser; 87' (5:3) Pavlovic	Attendance: 500; Referee: (Switzerland) Schwaller
Note: Basel were without Bauer, Marcolli, Rahmen, Wagner, Walker, Walther, and Zbinden (all injured or carrying knocks). Schaffhausen were without Allenspach, Janicjebic, and Guirao. The match kicked off a quarter of an hour late due to traffic congestion. 12th minute, goal from Sitek disallowed due to a preceding foul.

11 July 1992 Sempione-Cup final	Basel (Switzerland)	2–1	(Switzerland) Grenchen	Moos, Balsthal
19:00	Walker (yellow card) 40'; P. Rahmen 54' (1:1); P. Rahmen 64' (2:1)	FCB summary	11' (0:1) Przybolo; (yellow card) 68' Aebi; (yellow card) 88' Sahli	Attendance: 1,200; Referee: (Switzerland) Serge Muhmenthaler (Grenchen)
Note: FCB without the slightly injured or sick Grüter, Berg, Wagner, Mischa Rahmen, Bauer, Jenzer, Marcolli and Karrer.

15 July 1992 Pre-season	Basel (Switzerland)	1–0	(Germany) Borussia Dortmund	Wolfstiege, Gelterkinden
18:00	Sitek (yellow card) 41'; Sitek 66' (1:0)	FCB summary		Attendance: 4,200; Referee: (Switzerland) Walter Rudin (Birsfelden)

==== Winter break ====
24 January 1993 Winter break	Chiasso (Switzerland)	0–1	(Switzerland) Basel	Stadio Comunale (second field), Chiasso
14:00		FCB summary	9' (0:1) Sitek; (yellow card) 65' (yellow-red card) 67' Zbinden	Attendance: 250; Referee: (Switzerland) Francesco Bianchi (Chiasso)
Note: Chiasso without goalkeeper Bizzozero, Fargeon and Negri (all injured). Basel without Walker (injured), Marcolli and D’Ambrosio (both did not travel to Ticino).

27 January 1993 Winter break	Basel (Switzerland)	3–3	(Switzerland) Young Boys	St. Jakob Stadium, Basel
18:30	Sitek 18' (1:0); Sitek 33' (2:1); Sitek 86' (3:3)	FCB summary	27' (1:1) Weber; 41' (2:2) Jakobsen; 62' (2:3) Agostino	Attendance: 1,100; Referee: (Switzerland) Walter Rudin (Birsfelden)
Note: FCB without Walker (injured). YB without Bregy (national team), Kunz (ill) and Gross (injured).

1 February 1993 Training camp	Basel (Switzerland)	4–2	(Czech Republic) TJ Vitkovice	Maspalomas, Gran Canaria, Canary Islands
12:00	Ceccaroni 26' (1:0); Berg 46' (2:1); Sitek 48' (3:1); Berg 69' (4:1)	FCB summary	38' (1:1) Kabyl; 72' (4:2) Kabyl	Attendance: 100; Referee: (Switzerland) Andreas Schluchter (Schönenbuch)
Note: Basel without Lellek (injured), Walker (recovering), Zbinden (rested).

3 February 1993 Training camp	CD Maspalomas (Spain)	3–2	(Switzerland) Basel	Maspalomas, Gran Canaria, Canary Islands
21:00	Torres Perez 51' (1:0); Torres Perez 66' (2:1); Medina 73' (3:1)	FCB summary	67' (1:1) Marini; 81' (3:2) Marini	Attendance: 150; Referee: (Spain) Jimenez, (Gran Canaria)
Note: Basel with test player Marini. Basel played without Sitek (rested), Zbinden, Uccella, Reinwald, Walther and D’Ambrosio (all slightly injured) as well as Lellek (foot injury), Jeitziner, Schürmann and Berg nominated as substitutes, but not used.

5 February 1993 Training camp	Basel (Switzerland)	1–5	(Germany) Bayern Munich	Maspalomas, Gran Canaria, Canary Islands
21:00	Uccella 78' (1:4)	FCB summary	9' (0:1) Wohlfarth; 20' (0:2) Wohlfarth; 45' (0:3) Wohlfarth; 70' (0:4) Wohlfarth; 82' (1:5) Labbadia	Attendance: 2,000; Referee: (Spain) Garcia, (Gran Canaria)
Note: Bayern Munich without Sternkopf, Wouters, Jorginho (all injured); Basel without Lellek and Zbinden (both injured).

8 February 1993 Training camp	Basel (Switzerland)	0–1	(Czech Republic) TJ Vitkovice	Maspalomas, Gran Canaria, Canary Islands
		FCB summary	46' (0:1) Ciesla	Attendance: 50; Referee: (Switzerland) Andreas Schluchter (Schönenbuch)
Note: Basel without Lellek and Zbinden (both injured), Berg and Sitek (both rested).

13 February 1993 Winter break	Basel (Switzerland)	2–3	(Switzerland) Emmenbrücke	St. Jakob Stadium, Basel
14:30	Sitek 67' (pen. 1:3); Sitek 87' (2:3)	FCB summary	16' (0:1) Bühler; 54' (0:2) Andermatt; 60' (0:3) Mouidi	Attendance: 800; Referee: (Switzerland) Peter Bochsler (Basel)

15 February 1993 Winter break	Basel (Switzerland)	1–1	(Switzerland) Old Boys	Sports facilities St. Jakob (Athletics stadium), Münchenstein
19:00	Plotka 42' (1:1)	FCB summary	14' (0:1) Léchenne	Attendance: 500; Referee: (Switzerland) Andreas Schluchter (Schönenbuch)
Note: FCB with test player Plotka, without Lellek, Zbinden, Bauer, Sltek, Grüter (injured or rested) and without coach Friedel Rausch (ill, coaching by Uwe Dittus), OB without Saibene (with Luxembourg's national team in Greece).

17 February 1993 Winter break	Basel	0–0	Zürich	St. Jakob Stadium, Basel
20:00		FCZ summary Summary	(yellow card) 37' Kägi; (penalty missed) 87′ Waas	Attendance: 736; Referee: (Switzerland) Kurt Röthlisberger (Suhr)
Note: FCB without Lellek, Grüter, Bauer, D'Ambrosio, Jenzer, Walther, and Croatian Peternac, who had to forgo another friendly appearance due to a minor strain. Coach Friedel Rausch also absent due to illness (coaching by Uwe Dittus). FCZ without Isler and Heydecker, who were both ill, and goalkeeper Mader (conjunctivitis). 87th minute, Waas shot the penalty-kick wide of the goal.

21 February 1993 Winter break	Basel (Switzerland)	1–0	(Switzerland) Servette	St. Jakob Stadium, Basel
14:30	Berg 56' (1:0)	FCB summary		Attendance: 1,300; Referee: (Switzerland) Serge Muhmenthaler (Grenchen)
Note: FCB without Lellek (injured) and Grüter (ailing).

=== Nationalliga B ===
The qualification of the NLB began on 18 July 1992 and was completed on 29 November. The top six teams in each group were qualified to play in the two promotion/relegation groups. The bottom six teams in each group then played in the newly drawn groups against relegation.

==== Qualifying Phase West ====
18 July 1992 Round 1	Grenchen	1–0	Basel	Stadion Brühl, Grenchen
17:30	F. Sahli (yellow card) 31'; Lombardo (yellow card) 66'; Wenger 73' (1:0)	FCB summary	(yellow card) 41' Lellek; (yellow card) 87' Uccella	Attendance: 3,000; Referee: (Liechtenstein) Roland Beck (Triesenberg)
Note: FC Grenchen were without Röthlisberger (injured), FC Basel without the suspended Jeitziner and Zbinden, as well as without the injured Grüter, Bauer, Marcolli, Mischa Rahmen, Wagner, Jenzer, and Karrer. The refereeing was poor (completely inadequate protection for the fouled players, strange weighting of cautions).

21 July 1992 Round 2	Basel	2–0	Etoile Carouge	Stadion Schützenmatte, Basel
20:00	Schürmann 7' (1:0); P. Rahmen 52' (2:0); Berg (yellow card) 80'	FCB summary	(yellow card) 35' Morina	Attendance: 3,000; Referee: (Switzerland) Ruppen
Note: FCB without the injured Grüter, Marcolli, Bauer, Mischa Rahmen, Wagner and Karrer. Carouge without Morisod, Mosca and Regillo.

25 July 1992 Round 3	Chênois	2–2	Basel	Stade des Trois-Chêne, Trois-Chêne
17:30	Taddeo (yellow card) 24'; Novo (yellow card) 41' (yellow-red card) 62'; Ursea (yellow card) 61'; Ursea 72' (1:2); Grange 73' (2:2)	FCB summary	(yellow card) 3' Zbinden; (yellow card) 21'Ceccaroni; 47' (0:1) Sitek; 61' (0:2) Schürmann; (yellow card) 85' Berg	Attendance: 800; Referee: (Switzerland) Marti
Note: Basel without Walker, Mischa Rahmen, Grüter (all injured), Chênois without Rodriguez (injured) and Dimic (absent).

31 July 1992 Round 4	Basel	0–0	Yverdon-Sports	Stadion Schützenmatte, Basel
20:00	Sitek (yellow card) 36'; Baumgartner (yellow card) 84'	FCB summary	(yellow card) 57' (yellow-red card) 62' Castro	Attendance: 4,500; Referee: (Switzerland) Peter Kellenberger
Note: Basel were without Grüter, Mischa Rahmen and Walker (all three injured). Yverdon were at full strength. In the 62nd minute, Yverdon coach Bernard Challandes was sent to the stands. The refereeing trio had difficulty with the offside decisions.

8 August 1992 Round 5	La Chaux-de-Fonds	0–3	Basel	Stade Charrière, La Chaux-de-Fonds
17:30	Guede (yellow card) 82'	FCB summary	34' (0:1) Sitek; (yellow card) 68' Walker; 74' (0:2) Jeitziner; 85' (0:3) D'Ambrosio	Attendance: 900; Referee: (Switzerland) Daniel Roduit (Sion)
Note: Basel without Uccella, Grüter, and M. Rahmen (all injured), as well as Marcolli, Thalmann, Jakob, and Verrelli (all with the youth team). La Chaux-de-Fonds had their full squad available.

11 August 1992 Round 6	Basel	3–0	Old Boys	St. Jakob Stadium, Basel
20:00	Baumgartner 26' (1:0); Jeitziner (yellow card) 34'; Zbinden 74' (2:0); Sitek 82' (3:0); Jakob (yellow card) 89'	FCB summary	(yellow card) 22' Rivolta; (yellow card) 32' Kohler; (yellow card) 32' Vadászan	Attendance: 5,500; Referee: (Switzerland) Pierre-Alain Vuillemin (Geneva)
Note: FCB without Grüter, Uccella, Wagner, Jenzer, M. Rahmen and Karrer. OB without Messerli and Schembri.

18 August 1992 Round 7	Basel	7–0	Bümpliz	St. Jakob Stadium, Basel
20:00	Lellek 35' (1:0); Sitek 41' (2:0); Berg 60' (3:0); Walker (yellow card) 61'; Schürmann 83' (4:0); P. Rahmen 86' (5:0); Marcolli 88' (6:0); Sitek 90' (7:0)	FCB summary	(yellow card) 23' Fimian; (yellow card) 68' Todt	Attendance: 3,800; Referee: (Switzerland) Walter Nussbaumer (Crans-près-Céligny)
Note: FCB without Mischa Rahmen, Uccella and Grüter, Bümpliz without Aebi.

26 August 1992 Round 8	Urania Genève Sport	3–5	Basel	Stade de Frontenex, Geneva
20:00	Oranci 32' (1:3); Studer (yellow card) 41'; Studer 43' (2:3); Studer 61' (3:4)	FCB summary	1' (0:1) Sitek; 4' (0:2) Berg; 17' (0:3) Sitek; 46' (2:4) Schürmann; (yellow card) 58' Bauer; 83' (3:5) Sitek	Attendance: 450; Referee: (Liechtenstein) Roland Beck (Triesenberg)
Note: Urania without Beti (ill), Serra (military duty), and Besnard (injured). Basel without Zbinden, Walker, M. Rahmen, and Grüter (all injured).

29 August 1992 Round 9	Châtel-Saint-Denis	1–1	Basel	Stade du Lussy, Châtel-Saint-Denis
17:30	Piguet (yellow card) 27'; Ducret (yellow card) 31'; Sumerauer (yellow card) 58'; Ruiz 64' (1:1)	FCB summary	16' (0:1) Sitek	Attendance: 400; Referee: (Switzerland) Serge Muhmenthaler (Grenchen)
Note: Châtel-St-Denis without Baumann, Menoud, Moreno, and Dupraz (all injured). Basel without Grüter, Lellek, M. Rahmen, Steiner, Uccella, and Walker (all injured).

2 September 1992 Round 10	Basel	1–0	SR Delémont	St. Jakob Stadium, Basel
20:00	Zbinden 57' (1:0)	FCB summary	(yellow card) 54' Rothenbühler	Attendance: 5,800; Referee: (Switzerland) Willy Hänni, (Cugy)
Note: FC Basel without Lellek, Walker, Grüter and Micha Rahmen, Delémont without Renzi and Lovis (all injured).

12 September 1992 Round 11	Fribourg	0–3	Basel	Stade Universitaire, Freiburg
20:00	Bernhard (yellow card) 37'; Bourquenoud (red card) 67'	FCB summary	38' (0:1) P. Rahmen; 49' (0:2) P. Rahmen; 79' (0:3) P. Rahmen	Attendance: 1,058; Referee: (Switzerland) Erwin Fölmli
Note: Fribourg without Descloux and Schafer, Basel without M. Rahmen, Lellek, Walker and Grüter (all injured).

19 September 1992 Round 12	Basel	2–0	Grenchen	St. Jakob Stadium, Basel
20:00	Sitek 15' (1:0); Uccella (yellow card) 38'; Sitek 68' (2:0)	FCB summary	(yellow card) 31' Przybolo; (yellow card) 52' Aebi; (yellow card) 66' F. Sahli	Attendance: 4,759; Referee: (Switzerland) Peter Kellenberger
Note: FCB without Lellek (substitute, previously used in the youth team), Grüter, Mischa Rahmen, Walter, and Walker (all injured). Grenchen without Christoph Sahli, Röthlisberger, Maire (all injured), and Vifian (ill). FCB head-coach Friedel Rausch named only three substitutes (D'Ambrosio, Lellek, and goalkeeper Mark Rausch). The pitch was not fenced due to a pop concert. The referee dis a good job.

26 September 1992 Round 13	Etoile Carouge	0–1	Basel	Stade de la Fontenette, Carouge
20:00		FCB summary	51' (0:1) Sitek; (yellow card) 58' Baumgartner; (yellow card) 66' P. Rahmen	Attendance: 740; Referee: (Switzerland) Freddy Philippoz (Sion)
Note: Due to a power failure on one of the masts, the match started 30 minutes late. Carouge without Gamberini and Peneveyre (injured). FCB without Mischa Rahmen, Walker, and Grüter (injured).

7 October 1992 Round 14	Basel	3–0	Chênois	St. Jakob Stadium, Basel
20:00	Ceccaroni 20' (1:0); P. Rahmen 44' (2:0); P. Rahmen (yellow card) 68'; P. Rahmen 79' (3:0)	FCB summary	(yellow card) 25' Benito RodriguezRodriguez; (yellow card) 73' Oberson; (yellow card) 77' Novo	Attendance: 11,500; Referee: (Switzerland) Francesco Bianchi (Chiasso)
Note: FCB without Grüter and Walker (both injured) as well as Wagner, Marcolli and Steiner (youth team). Free entry thanks to a spectator promotion.

10 October 1992 Round 15	Basel	3–0	Fribourg	St. Jakob Stadium, Basel
20:00	Bauer (yellow card) 10'; Sitek 55' (1:0); Sitek 82' (2:0); Jenzer 90+1' (3:0)	FCB summary	(yellow card) 40' Bernhard	Attendance: 3,500; Referee: (Switzerland) Pierre-Alain Vuillemin (Geneva)
Note: FCB without Grüter, Jeitziner and Walker, FC Fribourg without their new Hungarian player Zsadanyi, Mottiez (injured during the warm-up), Piller and Caluwaerts (all injured).

18 October 1992 Round 16	Yverdon-Sports	3–1	Basel	Stade Municipal, Yverdon
14:30	(Uccella) 59' (o.g. 1:0); Kekesi (yellow card) 60'; Chatelan 67' (2:0); Comisetti 91' (3:0); Schrago (yellow card) 87'	FCB summary	90+2' (3:1) Sitek	Attendance: 3,750; Referee: (Switzerland) Hans Müller (Bern)
Note: Yverdon without Castro (injured), FCB without Walker, Grüter, Jeitziner (all injured), Bauer (suspended) and Ceccaroni (bronchitis).

24 October 1992 Round 17	Basel	2–0	La Chaux-de-Fonds	St. Jakob Stadium, Basel
20:00	Sitek 18' (1:0); Zbinden 62' (2:0)	FCB summary	(yellow card) 55' Gaille	Attendance: 2,500; Referee: (Switzerland) Marcel Vollenweider (Rüti, Zürich)
Note: FCB without Grüter, Jeitziner, Walker and Mischa Rahmen (all injured). Minute of silence for former government councilor Arnold Schneider, who attended every FCB home game until his death.

31 October 1992 Round 18	Old Boys	0–3	Basel	Schützenmatte, Basel
17:30	Brechbühl (red card) 48'; Léchenne (yellow card) 82'	FCB summary	(yellow card) 31' Zbinden; 75' (0:1) Marcolli; 89' (0:2) Sitek; 90+1' (0:3) D'Ambrosio	Attendance: 2,000; Referee: (Switzerland) Claude Detruche, (Thônex)
Note: OB without the injured Gaudiano, Giallanza, Schembri, and Rivolta, as well as the suspended Ryter. FCB without the injured Grüter, Walker, and Jeitziner, as well as Lellek, who was ill.

8 November 1992 Round 19	Bümpliz	0–0	Basel	Bodenweid, Bern
14:30	Zivkovic (yellow card) 68'	FCB summary	(yellow card) 63' Sitek	Attendance: 2,200; Referee: (Switzerland) Gottlieb Barmettler (Luzern)

14 November 1992 Round 20	Basel	8–0	Urania Genève Sport	St. Jakob Stadium, Basel
20:00	Sitek 14' (1:0); Ceccaroni 19' (2:0); P. Rahmen 24' (3:0); Sitek 26' (4:0); P. Rahmen 30' (5:0); P. Rahmen 54' (6:0); Sitek 75' (7:0); Uccella (yellow card) 77'; Berg 80' (8:0)	FCB summary	(yellow card) 61' Kospo	Attendance: 2,500; Referee: (Switzerland) Fabrice Kaltenrieder
Note: FCB without Walker, Jeitziner and Grüter, Urania without Cacciapaglia and Pavoni

22 November 1992 Round 21	Basel	3–0	Châtel-Saint-Denis	St. Jakob Stadium, Basel
14:30	Berg 4' (1:0); Zbinden 17' (2:0); Berg (yellow card) 35'; Sitek (yellow card) 60'; Berg 61' (3:0); Zbinden (yellow card) 73'	FCB summary	(yellow card) 1' Palombo; (yellow card) 35' Maillard; (yellow card) 74' Caverzasio	Attendance: 2,700; Referee: (Switzerland) Carlo Bertolini (Vira-Gambarogno)
Note: FCB without the long-term injured Jeitziner, Walker, and Grüter, as well as the suspended Uccella. Châtel without Simunek (injured).

29 November 1992 Round 22	SR Delémont	0–1	Basel	La Blancherie, Delémont
14:30	Borgeaud (yellow card) 74'	FCB summary	(yellow card) 22' Baumgartner; 82' (0:1) Uccella	Attendance: 1,800; Referee: (Switzerland) Pierre-Alain Vuillemin (Geneva)
Note: Basel without Grüter, Walker, Jeitziner, Wagner (all injured), Sitek, Berg and Zbinden (suspended). Delémont were without Renzi, Lovis, Bonato (all injured) and Egli (internally suspended). 9th minute, Jenzer's headed goal was disallowed due to offside.

==== League table ====
Pos	Team	Pld	W	D	L	GF	GA	GD	Pts	Qualification
1	Yverdon-Sport	22	17	3	2	60	24	+36	37	Promotion round
2	Basel	22	16	4	2	54	10	+44	36	Promotion round
3	Etoile Carouge	22	14	0	8	48	32	+16	28	Promotion round
4	CS Chênois	22	12	2	8	37	39	−2	26	Promotion round
5	Grenchen	22	11	3	8	40	25	+15	25	Promotion round
6	Delémont	22	8	5	9	31	33	−2	21	Promotion round
7	Urania Genève Sport	22	7	4	11	33	43	−10	18	Relegation round
8	Old Boys	22	5	7	10	27	39	−12	17	Relegation round
9	Fribourg	22	7	3	12	29	42	−13	17	Relegation round
10	SC Bümpliz 78	22	5	5	12	26	52	−26	15	Relegation round
11	Châtel-Saint-Denis	22	2	8	12	25	47	−22	12	Relegation round
12	La Chaux-de-Fonds	22	4	4	14	25	49	−24	12	Relegation round

Source: rsssf.com
Rules for classification: 1) Points; 2) Goal difference; 3) Goals scored; 4) Head-to-head points; 5) Away goals scored; 6) Draw.

==== Promotion/relegation Phase Group A ====
28 February 1993 Round 1	SR Delémont	0–2	Basel	La Blancherie, Delémont
14:30	Sallai (yellow card) 25'; Malllard (yellow card) 55'	FCB summary	(yellow card) 6' Schürmann; 13' (0:1) Chassot; (yellow card) 47' Uccella; 54' (0:2) Chassot; (yellow card) 86' Karrer; (yellow card) 90+1' Zbinden	Attendance: 5,100; Referee: (Switzerland) Freddy Philippoz (Sion)
Note: Delémont without the injured Lovis, Sonnleitner, and Coelho (all injured), as well as new signing Lorenzo (Moutier, not yet qualified); FCB without Patrick Rahmen (strain) and Smajic (suspended). The pitch was snow-covered, with the penalty areas cleared and the ground not frozen.

7 March 1993 Round 2	Basel	1–1	Wil	St. Jakob Stadium, Basel
14_30	(Cimino) 28' (o.g. 1:0); M. Rahmen (yellow card) 65'	FCB summary	(yellow card) 10' Manfred RaschleRaschle; 45+2' (1:1) Buhl; (yellow card) 67' Buhl	Attendance: 9,200; Referee: (Switzerland) Jürg Herrmann (Hinterkapplen (Wohlen bei Bern))
Note: FCB without Uccella (suspended), Jeitziner and Patrick Rahmen (injured) and Lellek (extra foreign player), Wil without Fuchs (ill) and Schneider (suspended).

14 March 1993 Round 3	Bulle	1–3	Basel	Stade de Bouleyres, Bulle
14:30	Hartmann 23' (1:1); Coria (yellow card) 29'	FCB summary	(yellow card) 8' Lellek; 21' (0:1) Lellek; (yellow card) 28' Walker; 37' (1:2) Berg; (yellow card) 70' Karrer; 77' (1:3) Sitek; (yellow card) 84' Chassot	Attendance: 4,500; Referee: (Switzerland) Francesco Bianchi (Chiasso)
Note: Bulle without Guillod (injured), Thomann (suspended), as well as Rumo, Rusca, Galley and Pittet (all playing for the youth team). Basel without Smajic, Bauer and Jeitziner (all injured).

24 March 1993 Round 4	Basel	0–2	Grasshopper Club	St. Jakob Stadium, Basel
20:00	Ceccaroni (yellow card) 33'; Smajić (yellow card) 68'	FCB summary	7' (0:1) Élber; (yellow card) 36' Bickel; 57' (0:2) Willems	Attendance: 34,000; Referee: (Switzerland) Kurt Röthlisberger (Suhr, Aargau)
Note: FCB without Bauer (injured) and Lellek (extra foreign player). GC without Gretarson, Gämperle (injured), and Yakin (ill).

3 April 1993 Round 5	Locarno	1–4	Basel	Stadio del Lido, Locarno
20:00	Gorini (yellow card) 42'; Barbas (yellow card) 45'; Popescu 53' (1:2)	FCB summary	5' (0:1) Baumgartner; 40' (0:2) Smajić; (yellow card) 49' Karrer; (yellow card) 57' Uccella; 65' (1:3) Sitek; 90' (1:4) Schürmann	Attendance: 4,500; Referee: (Switzerland) Karl Strässle (Steinach and Heiden)
Note: Locarno without the injured Pedrotti, Frizzi and Salmina; FCB without the suspended Ceccaroni, the injured Lellek, Walker, Jeitziner, Chassot, Patrick Rahmen, Bauer and without Marcolli, who was ill on the day of the match.

10 April 1993 Round 6	Basel	4–1	Chênois	St. Jakob Stadium, Basel
20:00	Ceccaroni (yellow card) 9'; Sitek 26' (pen. 1:0); Sitek (yellow card) 50'; Schürmann 70' (2:0); Chassot 89' (3:1); Smajić 90+2' (4:1)	FCB summary	(yellow card) 5' Mattioli; (yellow card) 29' Gianoli; (yellow card) 65' Taddeo; (yellow card) 71' Alberton; 76' (2:1) Taddeo; (yellow card) 80' Barea	Attendance: 10,200; Referee: (Switzerland) Werner Müller (Obererlinsbach)
Note: FCB without Jeitziner, Walker, Bauer and Lellek (all injured or recovering); Chênois without Ursea (injured) and Rodriguez (suspended).

24 April 1993 Round 7	Basel	1–1	Luzern	St. Jakob Stadium, Basel
20:00	Baumgartner (yellow card) 43'; Walker (yellow card) 52'; Chassot 59' (1:1); Uccella (yellow card) 74'	FCB summary	4' (0:1) Güntensperger; (yellow card) 16' Baumann; (yellow card) 50' Wolf; (yellow card) 61' van Eck; (yellow card) 67' Gerstenmájer	Attendance: 32,000; Referee: (Switzerland) Serge Muhmenthaler (Grenchen)
Note: FCB ohne Jeitziner, Bauer und Lellek; FCL ohne Schönenberger.

8 May 1993 Round 8	Luzern	4–1	Basel	Stadion Allmend Luzern
20:00	Gerstenmájer 1' (1:0); Rueda 46' (2:1); Güntensperger 74' (3:1); Birrer (yellow card) 53'; Rueda 63' (pen. 4:1); Gerstenmájer (yellow card) 75'	FCB summary	7' (1:1) Berg; (yellow card) 9' Baumgartner; (yellow card) 75' Smajić; (yellow card) 83' Ceccaroni; (yellow card) 83' Sitek	Attendance: 26,100; Referee: (Switzerland) Werner Müller (Obererlinsbach)
Note: FCL without Schönenberger, Russo (both injured) and Gilli (suspended), FCB without Michel Rahmen (injured) and Lellek (extra foreign player).

15 May 1993 Round 9	Chênois	0–1	Basel	Stade des Trois-Chêne, Chêne-Bourg
20:00	Gianoli (yellow card) 63'	FCB summary	47' (0:1) Berg	Attendance: 1,000; Referee: (Switzerland) Manfred Schlup, (Grenchen)
Note: Chênois without the suspended Popoviciu and Mattioli, as well as without the injured Duarte; FCB without the suspended Sitek, Smajic and Baumgartner, as well as without the injured Mischa Rahmen.

22 May 1993 Round 10	Basel	2–0	Locarno	St. Jakob Stadium, Basel
20:00	Chassot 63' (1:0); Chassot 90' (2:0)	FCB summary	(yellow card) 58' Gorini	Attendance: 7,500; Referee: (Switzerland) Gottfried Friedrich (Seedorf, Uri)
Note: FCB without Smajic (injured), with Sitek sidelined for the time being due to a groin strain. Locamo without the injured Bommarito, Moreira, and Pedrotti, as well as the suspended Barbas, Bützer, and Salmina.

25 May 1993 Round 11	Grasshopper Club	1–1	Basel	Hardturm, Zürich
20:00	Koller (yellow card) 57'; Willems 62' (pen. 1:0)	FCB summary	(yellow card) 3' Uccella; (yellow card) 7' Schürmann; (yellow card) 9' Walker; 70' (1:1) Sitek	Attendance: 14,800; Referee: (Switzerland) Manfred Schlup, (Grenchen)
Note: GC without the injured Elber, Gämperle, Gretarsson, and Yakin, as well as the suspended Bickel. FCB without Smajic and Micha Rahmen (injured) and without Lellek (unavailable, ill).

5 June 1993 Round 12	Basel	1–2	Bulle	St. Jakob Stadium, Basel
20:00	Baumgartner 33' (1:1); Baumgartner (yellow card) 35'; Bauer (yellow card) 66'	FCB summary	8' (0:1) Hartmann; (yellow card) 65' Coria; (yellow card) 80' Aubonney; (yellow card) 81' Eberhard; 82' (1:2) Bwalya	Attendance: 5,000; Referee: (Switzerland) Freddy Philippoz (Sion)
Note: FC Basel without Schürmann, UccelIa (both suspended), Lellek, Mischa Rahmen, Smajic (all injured), and FC Bulle without Rudakow, Rumo (both suspended), Guillod, Magnin, Thomann, Duc and Corminboeuf (all injured).

9 June 1993 Round 13	Wil	1–1	Basel	Stadion Bergholz, Wil
20:00	Petruzzi 9' (1:0)	FCB summary	70' (1:1) Berg	Attendance: 1,700; Referee: (Switzerland) Erwin Schuler
Note: FC Wil without Scherrer (suspended), Völsen, Ljaljic, and Schneider; FCB without Sitek and Ceccaroni (all injured). 49th minute, Rahmen's headed goal was disallowed due to an offside.

12 June 1993 Round 14	Basel	3–2	SR Delémont	St. Jakob Stadium, Basel
20:00	Chassot 4' (1:0); Chassot 44' (2:0); Smajić (yellow card) 67'; Chassot 72' (3:1)	FCB summary	(yellow card) 10' Varga; 47' (2:1) Renzi; 85' (3:2) Léchenne	Attendance: 1,104; Referee: (Switzerland) Ruppen
Note: FCB without the injured Sitek, Mischa Rahmen, Lellek, Ceccaroni, and Marcolli. Baumgartner was substituted with a suspected cruciate ligament tear. Delémont without Lovis (injured). Basel were without head-coach Rausch (at the match FC Zurich-Lugano); Uwe Dittus was the interim coach.

==== League table ====
Pos	Team	Pld	W	D	L	GF	GA	GD	Pts	Qualification
1	Grasshopper Club	14	10	2	2	42	8	+34	22	Remain in NLA 1993–94
2	Luzern	14	10	2	2	30	6	+24	22	Promoted to NLA 1993–94
3	Bulle	14	8	3	3	28	20	+8	19	Relegation to NLB 1993–94
4	Basel	14	7	4	3	25	17	+8	18	Remain in NLB 1993–94
5	SR Delémont	14	4	2	8	14	28	−14	10	Remain in NLB 1993–94
6	CS Chênois	14	4	1	9	9	29	−20	9	Remain in NLB 1993–94
7	Locarno	14	3	1	10	16	31	−15	7	Remain in NLB 1993–94
8	Wil	14	1	3	10	7	32	−25	5	Remain in NLB 1993–94

Source: rsssf.com
Rules for classification: 1) Points; 2) Goal difference; 3) Goals scored; 4) Head-to-head points; 5) Away goals scored; 6) Draw.

=== Swiss Cup ===
22 August 1992 Round 2	SC Baudepartement Basel	0–6	Basel	Leichtathletik Stadion St. Jakob, Basel
20:00	Röösli (yellow card) 70'	FCB summary	12' (0:1) Sitek; 15' (0:2) Berg; 20' (0:3) Sitek; 31' (0:4) Sitek; 43' (0:5) Schürmann; (yellow card) 45' Ceccaroni; 84' (0:6) Lellek	Attendance: 1,576; Referee: (Switzerland) Rieder
Note: 12th minute. Spagnuolo (Sitek's–guard) was forced off with a torn cruciate ligament in his knee and taken to hospital.

3 October 1992 Round 3	Basel	4–0	Old Boys	St. Jakob Stadium, Basel
20:00	Sitek 12' (1:0); Jeitziner 19' (2:0); Lellek 30' (3:0); Sitek 84' (4:0)	FCB summary		Attendance: 3,900; Referee: (Switzerland) Erwin Schuler

20 March 1993 Round 4	SC Young Fellows Juventus	0–3	Basel	Letzigrund, Zürich
14:30		FCB summary	8' (0:1) Sitek; 35' (0:2) Schürmann; (yellow card) 75' Sitek; 85' (0:3) Sitek	Attendance: 2,100; Referee: (Liechtenstein) Roland Beck (Triesenberg)
Note: YF Juventus without Tinner (injured), FCB without Patrick Rahmen, Uccella, Bauer, Jeitziner (all injured), Chassot, Walker, Lellek (all suspended).

6 April 1993 Round 5	Basel	3–0	FC Savièse	St. Jakob Stadium, Basel
20:00	Smajić 11' (1:0); Berg 17' (2:0); Smajić 27' (3:0)	FCB summary	(yellow card) 44' Obrist; (yellow card) 53' Lopez	Attendance: 2,600; Referee: (Switzerland) Francis Fischer (Arch)
Note: FCB without Walker, Jeitziner, Patrick Rahmen, Chassot, Karrer, Bauer and Lellek. FC Saviése without Berbard Varone, Devayes and Hertier.

20 April 1993 Quarterfinal	Basel	2–3	Xamax	St. Jakob Stadium, Basel
20:00	P. Rahmen (yellow card) 52'; Schürmann (yellow card) 68'; Sitek 76' (1:3); Sitek 86' (2:3); Smajić (yellow card) 90'	FCB summary	13' (0:1) Rothenbühler; 19' (0:2) Sutter; (yellow card) 21' Adriano; 26' (2:3) Sutter; (yellow card) 46' Rothenbühler; (yellow card) 90' Manfreda	Attendance: 13,000; Referee: (Switzerland) Urs Meier (Wettingen and Würenlos)
Note: FCB without Jeitziner, Bauer (injured), and Lellek (not in the squad). Xamax without Bonvin (injured) and Fasel (suspended). Visually, there seemed to be significantly more spectators in the stadium than the stated 13,000.

== See also ==
- History of FC Basel
- List of FC Basel players
- List of FC Basel seasons
