= 1992–93 Swiss Cup =

Tournament details
- Country: Switzerland
- Teams: 195

Final positions
- Champions: FC Lugano
- Runners-up: Grasshoppers

Tournament statistics
- Matches played: 194

The 1992–93 Swiss Cup was the 68th season of Switzerland's annual football cup competition. It began on the week-end 8–9 August 1992 with the first games of the first round and ended on Whit Monday 1993 with the Final held at Wankdorf, Bern. The winners earned a place in the qualifying round of the Cup Winners' Cup.

== Overview ==
The competition began on the second week-end 8in August 1992 with the games of the first round and ended on Whit Monday 31 May 1993 with the final held at the former Wankdorf Stadium in Bern. The 24 clubs from the Nationalliga B were granted byes for the first round. The 12 clubs from the Nationalliga A were granted byes for the first two rounds. The winners of the cup qualified themselves for the first round of the Cup Winners' Cup in the next season.

The draw was respecting regionalities, when possible, and the lower classed team was granted home advantage. In the entire competition, the matches were played in a single knockout format. In the event of a draw after 90 minutes, the match went into extra time. In the event of a draw at the end of extra time, a penalty shoot-out was to decide which team qualified for the next round. No replays were foreseen, except in the case that the final ended level after extra time.

== Round 1 ==
In the first round a total of 159 clubs participated from the third-tier and lower. Reserve teams were not admitted to the competition.

Team 1	Score	Team 2
8–9 August 1992
FC Boudry	0–2	FC Domdidier
FC Superga (La Chaux-de-Fonds)	0–2	Serrières
FC Internazionale Basilea	1–1 (a.e.t.) (3–4 p)	Muttenz
Meyrin	3–0	FC Saint-Jean GE
FC Grône	0–4	FC Aigle
FC Schwarz-Weiss Zürich	1–0	Freienbach
FC Lonay	0–2	FC Renens
FC Sierre	1–6	FC Fully
FC Bôle	2–4	Colombier
FC Wyler BE	0–4	Münsingen
FC Schönbühl BE	0–6	SV Lyss
Dornach	2–4 (a.e.t.)	FC Klus-Balsthal
FC Subingen	1–2	Laufen
FC Lachen	0–4	Tuggen
FC Tägerwilen	0–1	FC Altstätten (St. Gallen)
Gland	4–4 (a.e.t.) (8–7 p)	Montreux-Sports
FC Chalais	0–4	FC Raron
FC Interlaken	0–1	Bern
FC Fulenbach	2–2 (a.e.t.) (7–6 p)	FC Riehen
FC Breitenbach	3–2	Concordia Basel
FC Stans	1–2	Buochs
Bülach	0–1	FC Dübendorf
FC Einsielden	3–1	FC Glarus
FC Maggia	3–1	FC Rapid Lugano
Le Mont-sur-Lausanne	8–3	Italia Morges
Vevey Sports	3–2	FC Versoix
FC Moudon	3–1	ES Malley
FC Cornol	0–5	Moutier
FC Murten	1–2	Burgdorf
Ibach	0–2 (a.e.t.)	FC Zug
Hochdorf	3–1	FC Olten
FC Buttisholz	1–2	FC Gunzwil
Schöftland	3–3 (a.e.t.) (6–7 p)	Oberentfelden
Wohlen	0–3	FC Kölliken
FC Ebikon	1–7	SC Zug
FC Horgen	1–4	FC Altstetten (Zürich)
Biaschesi	4–5	FC Ascona
FC Bunt-Lichtensteig	0–2	FC Bad Ragaz
FC Vernier	2–5	FC Collex-Bossy
FC Leuzigen	0–5	Solothurn
FC Stade Payerne	4–0	FC Concordia Lausanne
FC Baar	1–2	FC Altdorf (Uri)
FC Schlieren ZH	0–5	FC Wiedikon
FC Glattbrugg	3–1	FC Seefeld ZH
FC Uzwil	0–4	Balzers
CS Romontois	0–3	Stade Lausanne
FC Courtepin	0–2	FC Beauregard Fribourg
Gossau	2–0 (a.e.t.)	Frauenfeld
FC Azzuri Bienne	3–1	FC Herzogenbuchsee
SC Baudepartement Basel	1–1 (a.e.t.) (6–5 p)	FC Pratteln
Zofingen	3–2	FC Lenzburg
FC Oerlikon (ZH)	0–13	YF Juventus
FC Stella Azzurra (Gümligen)	2–3	FC Lerchenfeld (Thun)
FC Regensdorf	2–1	FC Stäfa
FC Dietikon	3–1	SC Veltheim (Winterthur)
FC Höngg (ZH)	0–3	FC Küsnacht (ZH)
FC Naters	2–3	Monthey
FC Spreitenbach	0–1	Red Star
FC Muri (AG)	1–0	FC Suhr
FC Au	2–1 (a.e.t.)	FC Berg
Arbon	1–1 (a.e.t.) (6–5 p)	Kreuzlingen
FC Winkeln St.Gallen	1–2 (a.e.t.)	Brühl
FC Deitingen	3–2 (a.e.t.)	Wangen bei Olten
ASI Audax-Friul	1–3	Central Fribourg
FC Crissier	3–1	Baulmes
Signal FC (Bernex)	0–1	Grand-Lancy
FC Leytron	2–1	Martigny-Sports
Post Bern	0–4	FC Muri-Gümligen
FC Wädenswil	4–0	Blue Stars
AS Coldrerio	2–3	FC Stabio
FC Morbio	1–3	FC Tresa
FC Uzwil	0–3	FC Rorschach
FC Mels	2–1	Herisau
FC Hergiswil	0–7	FC Sursee
FC Varen	0–4	FC Savièse
FC Espagnol Montreux	1–7	Echallens
FC Ins	2–3	SC Ostermundigen
FC Rapid Ostermundigen	0–1	Thun
FC Les Breuleux	0–2 * FF awd 3–0	FC Bure

- Mendrisio qualified for the second round with a bye for the first round.
- Note to the match Les Breuleux–Renens: the result was annulled and awarded as a 3–0 victory for Les Breuleux.

== Round 2 ==
The 24 clubs from the Nationalliga B were granted byes for the first round and joined the competition in the second round. These teams were seeded and cound not be drawn against each other. The draw respected regionalities, when possible, and the lower classed team was granted home advantage.

=== Summary ===
Team 1	Score	Team 2
22–23 August 1992
SC Baudepartement Basel	0–6	Basel
Gossau	3–0	FC Wil
FC Maggia	0–3	Luzern
FC Tresa	1–6	Locarno
FC Einsielden	4–3	FC Brüttisellen
FC Sursee	0–4	Kriens
Vevey Sports	0–2	Chênois
Grand-Lancy	3–2	Étoile Carouge
FC Küsnacht (ZH)	0–1	FC Schaffhausen
Burgdorf	3–0	La Chaux-de-Fonds
FC Fulenbach	0–8	Grenchen
Laufen	0–4	Delémont
Solothurn	0–3	Old Boys
FC Beauregard Fribourg	2–5	Fribourg
FC Renens	4–3	Yverdon-Sports
FC Stade Payerne	3–5	Urania Genève Sport
SC Ostermundigen	2–11	FC Châtel-St-Denis
FC Wädenswil	2–4	Winterthur
FC Muri (AG)	0–1	Emmenbrücke
FC Azzuri Bienne	1–2	Bümpliz
Zofingen	0–4	Baden
FC Regensdorf	2–5	Wettingen
FC Bad Ragaz	2–0	Chur
FC Stabio	1–5	Bellinzona
Monthey	1–0	FC Raron
SV Lyss	3–3 (a.e.t.) (2–3 p)	Münsingen
Buochs	2–1	FC Zug
FC Altstetten (Zürich)	3–2	FC Wiedikon
Mendrisio	3–2	FC Ascona
FC Les Breuleux	0–2	Moutier
FC Moudon	0–4	Stade Lausanne
Baulmes	1–2	Echallens
FC Domdidier	4–3	Serrières
FC Dübendorf	0–4	Red Star
FC Mels	0–2	FC Altstätten (St. Gallen)
Hochdorf	3–0	FC Kölliken
Gland	3–1	Meyrin
FC Altdorf (Uri)	0–1	FC Gunzwil
FC Schwarz-Weiss Zürich	2–1	FC Glattbrugg
FC Rorschach	1–0	Brühl
FC Aigle	2–3	FC Savièse
FC Leytron	2–5	FC Fully
Central Fribourg	1–3	Thun
FC Muri-Gümligen	3–7	Colombier
FC Bern	1–2	FC Lerchenfeld (Thun)
FC Oberentfelden	2–2 (a.e.t.) (3–5 p)	SC Zug
FC Breitenbach	1–1 (a.e.t.) (2–3 p)	FC Klus-Balsthal
FC Au	0–7	Tuggen
FC Dietikon	0–2	YF Juventus
Le Mont-sur-Lausanne	2–1	FC Collex-Bossy
FC Deitingen	0–7	Muttenz
Arbon	5–4	Balzers

=== Matches ===
22 August 1992
20:00

SC Baudepartement Basel	0–6	Basel
Röösli (yellow card) 70'	FCB summary	12' (0:1) Sitek; 15' (0:2) Berg; 20' (0:3) Sitek; 31' (0:4) Sitek; 43' (0:5) Schürmann; (yellow card) 45' Ceccaroni; 84' (0:6) Lellek

Leichtathletik Stadion St. Jakob, Basel
Attendance: 1,576
Referee: (Switzerland) Rieder

== Round 3 ==
The 12 clubs from the Nationalliga A were granted byes for the first two rounds and they joined the competition in this round. These teams were seeded and cound not be drawn against each other. The draw respected regionalities, when possible, and the lower classed team was granted home advantage.

=== Summary ===
Team 1	Score	Team 2
2 October 1992
Fribourg	7–4 (a.e.t.)	Bümpliz
Kriens	1–0	Emmenbrücke
Stade Lausanne	1–5	Lausanne-Sport
Winterthur	2–5	St. Gallen
Thun	1–2	FC Bulle
3 October 1992
Gland	0–4	FC Fully
FC Klus-Balsthal	2–2 (a.e.t.) (4–2 p)	Wettingen
Muttenz	1–2	Baden
FC Oberentfelden	3–4	Mendrisio
Tuggen	1–3	Red Star
Hochdorf	1–2	Buochs
FC Renens	0–3	Sion
FC Rorschach	1–7	Grasshopper Club
Chênois	1–1 (a.e.t.) (7–8 p)	Servette
Delémont	0–2	Young Boys
Colombier	1:0	Moutier
Basel	4–0	Old Boys
FC Domdidier	0–1	FC Châtel-St-Denis
Locarno	2–0	Grenchen
Luzern	1–0	Chiasso
FC Altstätten (St. Gallen)	0–5	FC Schaffhausen
4 October 1992
Burgdorf	4–3	FC Lerchenfeld (Thun)
Echallens	0–1	Urania Genève Sport
Münsingen	1–4	Xamax
Arbon	0–3	Zürich
FC Gunzwil	2–7	Lugano
Le Mont-sur-Lausanne	1–1 (a.e.t.) (3–5 p)	FC Savièse
FC Bad Ragaz	0–4	Gossau
FC Einsielden	1–2	SC YF Juventus
Grand-Lancy	2–0	Monthey
FC Schwarz Weiss Zürich	0–1	FC Altstetten (Zürich)
5 October 1992
Bellinzona	0–3	Aarau

=== Matches ===
3 October 1992

FC Rorschach	1–7	Grasshopper Club
Hafner 57' (1:4)	RSSSF summary	7' (0:1) Bickel; 22' (0:2) Sutter; 34' (0:3) Magnin; 46' (0:4) Élber; 75' (pen.) Sutter; 85' (1:6) Élber; 90' (1:7) Hermann

Sportplatz Kellen, Rorschach

3 October 1992

Chênois	1–1 (a.e.t.)	Servette
Popoviviu 50' (1:0)	Servette summary	82' (1:1) Tarare
Penalties
Penalty scored Penalty missed	7–8	Penalty scored

Stade des Trois-Chêne, Thônex

3 October 1992

Delémont	0–2	Young Boys
	YB summary	30' (0:1) Nowak; 74' (0:2) Christensen

La Blancherie, Delémont
Attendance: 1,400
Referee: (Switzerland) Michel Zen Ruffinen

3 October 1992
20:00

Basel	4–0	Old Boys
Sitek 12' (1:0); Jeitziner 19' (2:0); Lellek 30' (3:0); Sitek 84' (4:0)	FCB summary

St. Jakob Stadium, Basel
Attendance: 3,900
Referee: (Switzerland) Erwin Schuler

4 October 1992

FC Arbon	0–3	Zürich
	FCZ summary	24' (0:1) Makalakalane; 36' (0:2) Heydecker; 41' (0:3) Casamento; (yellow card) 85' Makalakalane

Stacherholz, Arbon
Attendance: 1,200
Referee: (Liechtenstein) Roland Beck (Triesenberg)

5 October 1992

Bellinzona	0–3	Aarau
	FCA summary	25' (0:1) Wyss; 57' (0:2) Aleksandrov; 89' (0:3) Aleksandrov

Stadio Comunale, Bellinzona
Attendance: 680
Referee: (Switzerland) Marcel Vollenweider (Rüti, Zürich)

== Round 4 ==
=== Summary ===
Team 1	Score	Team 2
20 March 1993
FC Altstetten (Zürich)	0–2 (a.e.t.)	Locarno
FC Châtel-St-Denis	1–3	Lausanne-Sport
Mendrisio	0–3	Zürich
Red Star	0–1	Kriens
FC Savièse	3–2	Grand-Lancy
Buochs	2–1	FC Klus-Balsthal
Baden	1–5	Young Boys
Urania Genève Sport	0–4	Xamax
21 March 1993
Aarau	1–2	Grasshopper Club
Bulle	1–4	Sion
Burgdorf	0–2	Luzern
Colombier	1–3	Fribourg
FC Fully	0–5	Servette
FC Schaffhausen	0–0 (a.e.t.) (5–3 p)	St. Gallen
YF Juventus	0–3	Basel
Gossau	1–3	Lugano

=== Matches ===
20 March 1993

Mendrisio	0–3	Zürich
Fontana (yellow card) 39'	FCZ summary	50' (pen.) Grassi; 82' (0:2) Sesa; 89' (0:3) Sesa

Centro Sportivo Comunale, Mendrisio
Attendance: 800
Referee: (Switzerland) Jürg Herrmann (Hinterkapplen (Wohlen bei Bern))

20 March 1993

Baden	1–5	Young Boys
Makalakalane 68' (1:3)	YB summary	24' (0:1) Jakobsen; 45' (0:2) Hänzi; 64' (0:3) Kunz; 83' (1:4) Kunz; 90+1' (1:5) Bregy

Esp Stadium, Fislisbach
Attendance: 932
Referee: (Switzerland) Erwin Fölmli

21 March 1993

Aarau	1–2	Grasshopper Club
Di Matteo 33' (1:0)	FCA summary	80' (1:1) Bickel; 82' (1:2) Közle

Stadion Brügglifeld, Aarau
Attendance: 7,700
Referee: Daniel Roduit Sion, Switzerland

21 March 1993

FC Fully	0–5	Servette
	Servette summary	8' (0:1) Tarare; 33' (0:2) Sinval; 48' (o.g.) (Bruchez); 60' (0:4) Neuville; 88' (o.g.) (Bruchez)

Stade de Charnot, Fully
Attendance: 1,000

20 March 1993
14:30

SC Young Fellows Juventus	0–3	Basel
	FCB summary	8' (0:1) Sitek; 35' (0:2) Schürmann; (yellow card) 75' Sitek; 85' (0:3) Sitek

Letzigrund, Zürich
Attendance: 2,100
Referee: (Liechtenstein) Roland Beck (Triesenberg)

== Round 5 ==
=== Summary ===
Team 1	Score	Team 2
6 April 1993
FC Basel	3–0	FC Savièse
Fribourg	0–4	Grasshopper Club
Kriens	3–2 (a.e.t.)	Buochs
Lausanne-Sport	1–1 (a.e.t.) (3–4 p)	Sion
Xamax	2–1 (a.e.t.)	Luzern
FC Schaffhausen	0–5	Zürich
Servette	1–0	FC Locarno
Young Boys	1–1 (a.e.t.) (4–5 p)	FC Lugano

=== Matches ===
6 April 1993
20:00

Basel	3–0	FC Savièse
Smajić 11' (1:0); Berg 17' (2:0); Smajić 27' (3:0)	FCB summary	(yellow card) 44' Obrist; (yellow card) 53' Lopez

St. Jakob Stadium, Basel
Attendance: 2,600
Referee: (Switzerland) Francis Fischer

6 April 1993

Fribourg	0–4	Grasshopper Club
	RSSSF summary	6' (0:1) Közle; 37' (0:2) Sutter; 41' (0:3) Élber; 82' (0:4) Közle

Stade Universitaire Saint-Léonard, Fribourg

6 April 1993

FC Schaffhausen	0–5	Zürich
	FCZ summary	9' (0:1) Grassi; 33' (0:2) Waas; 37' (0:3) Baldassari; 63' (0:4) Škoro; 74' (0:5) Grassi

Stadion Breite, Schaffhausen
Attendance: 2,059
Referee: (Switzerland) Michel Zen Ruffinen

6 April 1993

Servette	1–0	FC Locarno
Mielcarski 27' (1:0)	Servette summary

Charmilles Stadium, Geneva

6 April 1993

Young Boys	1–1 (a.e.t.)	FC Lugano
Jakobsen 115' (1:1)	YB summary	107' (0:1) Subiat
Penalties
Bregy (penalty scored); Jakobsen (penalty scored); Baumann (penalty scored); Moser (penalty scored); Weber (penalty missed)	4–5	(penalty scored) Tami; (penalty scored) Penzavalli; (penalty scored) Subiat; (penalty scored) Morf; (penalty scored) Galvão

Wankdorf Stadium, Bern
Attendance: 2,450
Referee: (Switzerland) Fredy Philippoz (Sion)

== Quarter-finals ==
=== Summary ===
Team 1	Score	Team 2
20 April 1993
Servette	2–2 (a.e.t.) (5–3 p)	Sion
Basel	2–3	Xamax
Kriens	2–3	Grasshopper Club
Lugano	4–2	Zürich

=== Matches ===
20 April 1993

Servette	2–2 (a.e.t.)	Sion
Anderson 18' (1:0); Anderson 54' (2:0)	Servette summary	74' (2:1) Assis; 87' (2:2) Biaggi
Penalties
Penalty scored	5–3	Penalty scored Penalty missed

Charmilles Stadium, Geneva

20 April 1993
20:00

Basel	2–3	Xamax
P. Rahmen (yellow card) 52'; Schürmann (yellow card) 68'; Sitek 76' (1:3); Sitek 86' (2:3); Smajić (yellow card) 90'	FCB summary	13' (0:1) Rothenbühler; 19' (0:2) Sutter; (yellow card) 21' Adriano; 26' (2:3) Sutter; (yellow card) 46' Rothenbühler; (yellow card) 90' Manfreda

St. Jakob Stadium, Basel
Attendance: 13,000
Referee: (Switzerland) Urs Meier

20 April 1993

Kriens	2–3	Grasshopper Club
Berchtold 34' (1:2); Vukic 49' (2:2)	RSSSF summary	2' (0:1) Közle; 32' (0:2) Willems; 77' (2:3) Nakhid

Stadion Kleinfeld, Kriens

20 April 1993

Lugano	4–2	Zürich
Subiat 26' (1:1); Jensen 54' (2:1); Sylvestre 74' (3:2); Penzavalli 85' (4:2)	FCZ summary	7' (0:1) Studer; 57' (2:2) Grassi

Cornaredo, Lugano
Attendance: 3,500
Referee: (Switzerland) Gottfried Friedrich (Seedorf, Uri)

== Semi-finals ==
=== Summary ===
Team 1	Score	Team 2
4 May 1993
Xamax	2–3 (a.e.t.)	Lugano
Servette	0–2	Grasshopper Club

=== Matches ===
4 May 1993

Xamax	2–3 (a.e.t.)	Lugano
(Kaeslin) 69' (o.g.); Adriano 90+2' (2:2)	RSSSF summary	50' (0:1) Colombo; 57' (0:2) Zuffi; 116' (2:3) Subiat

Stade de la Maladière (1924), Neuchâtel
Attendance: 4,000
Referee: Daniel Roduit Sion, Switzerland

4 May 1993

Servette	0–2	Grasshopper Club
	Servette summary	38' (0:1) Bickel; 88' (0:2) Magnin

Charmilles Stadium, Geneva
Attendance: 9,300
Referee: (Switzerland) Fredy Philippoz (Sion)

== Final ==
=== Summary ===
Team 1	Score	Team 2
31 May 1993
FC Lugano	4–1	Grasshopper Club

=== Telegram ===
31 May 1993
15:00

FC Lugano	4–1	Grasshopper Club
Andrioli 14' (1:0); Subiat 41' (2:0); Subiat 72' (3:1); Fornera 89' (4:1)	Report	61' (2:1) Élber

Wankdorf, Bern
Attendance: 20,000
Referee: (Switzerland) Gottfried Friedrich (Seedorf)

FC Lugano won the cup and this was the club's third cup title to this date.

== Further in Swiss football ==
- 1992–93 Nationalliga A
- 1992–93 Nationalliga B
- 1992–93 Swiss 1. Liga

== Sources and references ==
- Switzerland 1992/93 at RSSSF
