= Dirk Lellek =

German footballer (1964–2016)

Personal information
- Date of birth: 3 January 1964
- Place of birth: Bremen, Germany
- Date of death: 21 April 2016 (aged 52)
- Place of death: Ahlhorn, Germany
- Height: 1.97 m (6 ft 6 in)
- Position: Defender

Youth career
- 1972–1982: Werder Bremen

Senior career*
Years	Team	Apps	(Gls)
1982–1985	Werder Bremen II		
1983–1985	Werder Bremen	6	(1)
1985–1986	→Hertha BSC (loan)	25	(4)
1986	→Viktoria Aschaffenburg (loan)	9	(1)
1987	Werder Bremen	0	(0)
1987–1988	VfB Oldenburg	2	(0)
1988–1990	Eintracht Braunschweig	59	(5)
1990–1992	VfL Osnabrück	67	(5)
1992–1993	FC Basel	18	(2)
1993–1995	VfB Oldenburg		
1995–1996	SV Wilhelmshaven		
1996–1997	Kickers Emden		
- * Club domestic league appearances and goals

Dirk Lellek (3 January 1964 – 21 April 2016) was a German professional footballer who played as a defender.

== Career ==
Lellek started his children's football with Werder Bremen and stayed with their youth department until he advanced up to their amateur team. With them he became German amateur champion in the 1984–85 season. In the same year, the professionals, for whom he had appeared six times, finished second in the Bundesliga.

For the 1985–86 season, Lellek was loaned out to Hertha BSC in the then still divided Berlin. Hertas first team coach at that time was Uwe Kliemann and they played in the 2. Bundesliga. Lellek had 25 league appearances, scoring four goals in his loan season. In the following season he was loaned six months to Viktoria Aschaffenburg and with them he made nine league appearances scoring one goal. In the New Year he was called back into the Werder first team, but he did not receive any playing time.

In the summer of 1987 Lellek signed a one-year contract with VfB Oldenburg, who at that time played in the Oberliga Nord the third tier of German football. Lellek then moved to Eintracht Braunschweig, who at that time played in the 2. Bundesliga, where he played for two seasons and afterwards two seasons for VfL Osnabrück.

At the age of 28, the central defender Lellek was signed by FC Basel for their 1992–93 season. Their first team, under head coach Friedel Rausch, were making its fifth attempt to return to the Nationalliga A. After playing in four test games, Lellek played his Swiss domestic league debut for the club in the away game on 18 July 1992 as Basel were defeated 1–0 by Grenchen. He scored his first goal for his new team in the home game in the St. Jakob Stadium one month later, on 18 August. It was the first goal of the game as Basel went on to win 7–0 against Bümpliz. In March Lellek was injured and he was out until the end of the season. The team missed their promotion aim and Lellek returned to Germany.

During his time with the club, he played a total of 27 games for Basel scoring a total of six goals. 18 of these games were in the Swiss Super League, two in the Swiss Cup and seven were friendly games. He scored two goals in the domestic league, two in the cup and the other two were scored during the test games.

Lellek then ended his active career at VfB Oldenburg, SV Wilhelmshaven and Kickers Emden. Later he worked for various amateur clubs as a trainer for a short time.

== Private life ==
Before entering professional football, Lellek completed an apprenticeship as a business clerk at the Theater Bremen. During his football career, he broke his foot three times in a very short space of time. That threw him off track. "It's not interesting to me whether my career would have been different without the injuries. I'm quite happy the way it was," he once said.

After his active football career Lellek worked professionally in adult education in Oldenburg and Bremen and he worked in sales. Lellek lived with his wife and two sons in the town of Ahlhorn (Grosskneten) in Lower Saxony for more than 20 years. He died a sudden death on 21 April 2016.

== Sources ==
- Josef Zindel (2018). FC Basel 1893. Die ersten 125 Jahre (in German). Basel: Friedrich Reinhardt Verlag. ISBN 978-3-7245-2305-5.
- Verein "Basler Fussballarchiv" Homepage
