= Aleksandr Shchipkov =

Aleksandr Shchipkov may refer to:

- Aleksandr Shchipkov (born 1981), Russian association football player
- Aleksandr Shchipkov (born 1957), Russian sociologist of religion
