= Granero =

Granero is a surname. Notable people with the surname include:

- Borja Granero (born 1990), Spanish footballer
- Esteban Granero (born 1987), Spanish footballer
- José Carlos Granero (born 1963), Spanish footballer
- Jose Gonzalez Granero (born 1985), Spanish clarinetist and composer
- Juanjo García Granero (born 1981), Spanish footballer
