= Reinwald =

Reinwald is a surname. Notable people with the surname include:

- Christian Reinwald (born 1964), Swiss football goalkeeper
- Christophine Reinwald (1757–1847), German artist
- Grete Reinwald (1902–1983), German actress
- Hanni Reinwald (1903–1978), German actress
- Otto Reinwald (1899–1968), German actor
