= Klyuyev =

Klyuyev or Klyuev (Russian: Клюев) is a Russian surname. Notable people with the surname include:

- Aleksandr Klyuyev, Russian football player
- Andriy Klyuyev, Ukrainian businessman and politician
- Boris Klyuyev, Russian actor
- Denis Klyuyev, Russian football player
- Nikolai Klyuev, Russian poet
- Serhiy Klyuyev, Ukrainian businessman and politician
- Yury Klyuyev, Russian speed skater
