= Pasquale D'Ambrosio =

Swiss footballer (born 1971)

Personal information
- Full name: Pasquale D'Ambrosio
- Date of birth: 7 October 1971 (age 55)
- Place of birth: Basel, Switzerland
- Positions: Defender; midfielder

Youth career
- until 1992: FC Basel

Senior career*
| Years | Team | Apps | (Gls) |
| 1992–1993 | FC Basel | 17 | (2) |
- * Club domestic league appearances and goals

Pasquale D'Ambrosio (born 7 October 1971) is a Swiss retired footballer who played for FC Basel. He played mainly in the position as midfielder, but also as defender.

== Football career ==
D'Ambrosio played his youth football with FC Basel and advanced to their first team for their 1992–93 season, signing a one-year professional contract, under head coach Friedel Rausch. After playing in four test games D'Ambrosio played his domestic league debut for the club, coming on as substitute, in the away game on 18 July 1992 in Stadion Brühl as Basel were defeated 1–0 by Grenchen. He scored his first goal for his club on 8 August in the away game against La Chaux-de-Fonds as Basel won 3–0.

D'Ambrosio played only this one season for the club, in which he a total of 25 games for Basel scoring a total of 2 goals. 17 of these games were in the Nationalliga A, 2 in the Swiss Cup and 6 were friendly games. He scored both his goals in the domestic league.

== Sources ==
- Die ersten 125 Jahre. Publisher: Josef Zindel im Friedrich Reinhardt Verlag, Basel. ISBN 978-3-7245-2305-5
- Verein "Basler Fussballarchiv" Homepage
