= Jadestadion =

Football stadium in Wilhelmshaven, Germany

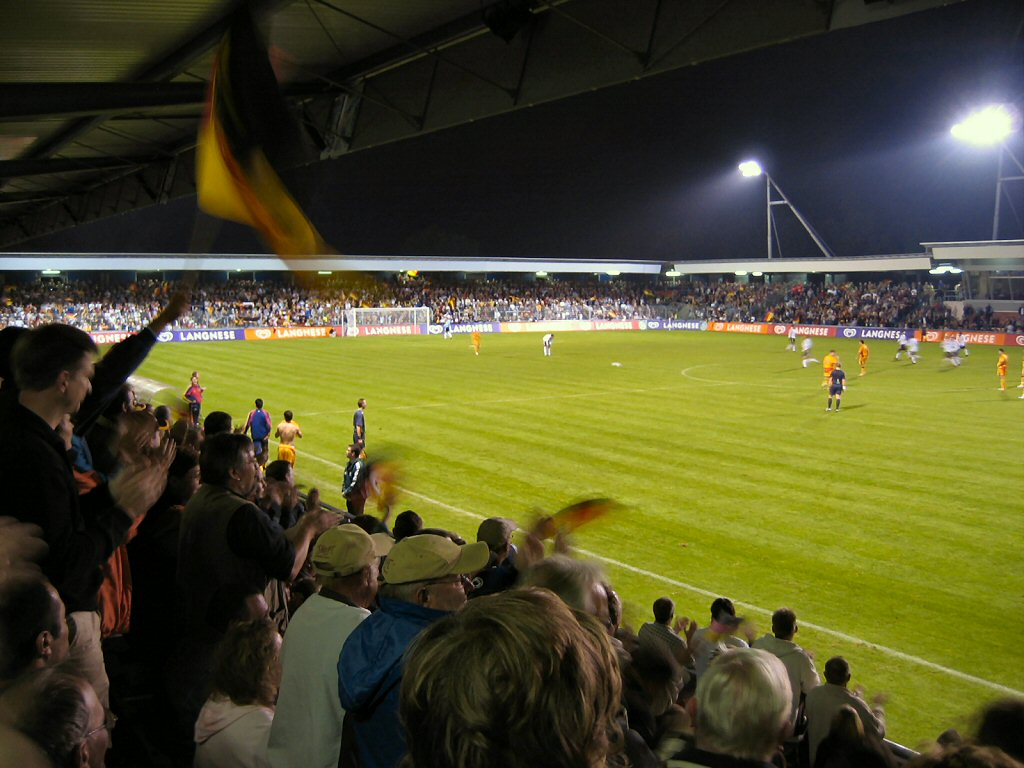
- Interactive map of Jadestadion
- Coordinates: 53°32′5″N 8°5′53″E
- Owner: City of Wilhelmshaven
- Capacity: 7,500
- Surface: grass

Construction
- Opened: 1999

Tenant
- SV Wilhelmshaven

Jadestadion is a multi-use stadium in Wilhelmshaven, Germany. It is used mostly for football matches and is the home stadium of SV Wilhelmshaven. The capacity is 7,500 people.
