= Alan Sakiyev =

Russian footballer

Personal information
- Full name: Alan Khasanovich Sakiyev
- Date of birth: 2 August 1981 (age 45)
- Height: 1.70 m (5 ft 7 in)
- Position: Midfielder

Senior career*
Years	Team	Apps	(Gls)
1997–1999	FC Alania Vladikavkaz	2	(0)
1997–1998	→ FC Alania-d Vladikavkaz (loan)	32	(6)
2000	FC Avtodor Vladikavkaz	5	(1)
2000	FC Nemkom Krasnodar (D4)		
2001–2003	FC Sokol Saratov	20	(3)
2006	FC Sokol Saratov (D4)		
2007	FC Spartak-UGP Anapa	5	(0)
2007	FC Spartak Gelendzhik		
- * Club domestic league appearances and goals

Alan Khasanovich Sakiyev (Russian: Алан Хасанович Сакиев; born 2 August 1981) is a former Russian football player.

He represented Russia at the 1998 UEFA European Under-16 Championship.

In 2003, he was seriously injured in a car accident which killed 3 other people, including a professional player Tamerlan Tskhovrebov.
