= Dave Warren (footballer) =

Irish footballer

Personal information
- Date of birth: 28 February 1982 (age 44)
- Place of birth: Cork, Ireland
- Position: Forward

Youth career
- –1999: Mayfield United F.C.

Senior career*
Years	Team	Apps	(Gls)
1999–2002	Wrexham	6	(0)
2002–2003	Cork City	18	(0)
2003	→ Cobh Ramblers (loan)	13	(3)
2004–2006	Cobh Ramblers (loan)	79	(16)
2007–2009	Waterford United	3	(0)
2010	Cork City	7	(0)
Medal record
Men's football
Representing Republic of Ireland
UEFA Euro U-16
Winner	1998 Scotland
- * Club domestic league appearances and goals

Dave Warren (born 28 February 1981) is a former professional footballer who played as a forward for League of Ireland side Cork City. Warren's previous clubs include Wrexham FC and Cobh Ramblers.

== Career ==
Warren was born in Cork. He took his first football steps with local club Mayfield United as a central midfielder.

In 2000, he moved to Welsh side Wrexham but after two frustrating seasons during which he made just six League appearances for The Robins. The financial troubles that beset the Football League meant that Warren was released by Wrexham in 2002 and he returned to his hometown club Cork City along with the likes of George O'Callaghan and John O'Flynn.

At Turner's Cross, Warren struggled for form and moved on loan to Cobh . There he impressed under then-manager Dave Hill who made the move to St Colman's Park permanent. After a successful spell at Cobh, Warren moved to League of Ireland Premier Division side Waterford United in 2007.
