= André Sitek =

Dutch footballer

Personal information
- Full name: André Sitek
- Date of birth: 17 April 1963 (age 63)
- Position: Forward

Youth career
- 1978–1983: HFC Haarlem

Senior career*
Years	Team	Apps	(Gls)
1983–1988	HFC Haarlem		
1988–1989	FC Chur	27	(17)
1989–1991	FC Baden	66	(41)
1991–1993	FC Basel	61	(44)
1993–1995	FC Locarno		
- * Club domestic league appearances and goals

André Sitek (born 17 April 1963) is a retired Dutch football striker who played in the 1980s and 90s. He played first in the Netherlands and in 1988 moved to Switzerland. After his playing career he returned to the Netherlands and became sport journalist.

== Football career ==
Aged 15, in 1978, Sitek joined the youth system of HFC Haarlem and he later advanced to their first team, who at that time played in the Eredivisie. In the 1986–87 and 1987–88 season Sitek was regular starter in the team. In the summer 1988 Sitec moved to Switzerland and signed for FC Chur, who at that time played in the Nationalliga B, the second tier of Swiss football. He stayed with Chur for one season and then moved on to FC Baden, also for two seasons.tel

Sitek joined FC Basel for their 1991–92 season under head coach Ernst August Künnecke. After playing one test game Sitek played his domestic league debut for his new club in the away game in the Stadion Schützenmatte on 17 August as FCB lost 0–4 against local rivals Old Boys. He scored his first goal for the club a week later, on 24 August in the away game as Basel won 4–0 against Châtel-Saint-Denis. Sitek scored his first hat-trick for FCB in the away match on 17 November as Basel won 3–2 against Fribourg. Sitek was the team's top goal scorer in the league season with 20 goals.

For their 1992–93 season the club appointed Friedel Rausch as new trainer. Sitek was on top form and was the team's top goal scorer in the first part of the season. In the qualifying phase, he scored 20 goals in 22 appearances. He scored a hat-trick in the away game against Urania Genève Sport on 26 August as Basel won 5–3 and in the return match, on 14 November, as Basel won 8–0 he scored another hat-trick. He also scored a hattrick in the first round cup match against SC Baudepartement. In second phase of the season Sitek was no longer in such a good form and rumors were circulated as to why. He scored only four times in the team's 14 games and they missed promotion. At the end of the season Sitek's contract was not extended. During his two seasons with the club Sitek played a total of 89 games for Basel scoring a total of 77 goals. 61 of these games were in the Nationalliga A, 9 in the Swiss Cup and 19 were friendly games. He scored 44 goals in the domestic league, 12 in the cup and the other 21 were scored during the test games.

Following his time with Basel Sitek signed for FC Locarno and remained with them for two seasons before he retired from active football.

== Private life ==
After his active football career Sitek returned to the Netherlands and became sport journalist.

== Sources ==
- Die ersten 125 Jahre. Publisher: Josef Zindel im Friedrich Reinhardt Verlag, Basel. ISBN 978-3-7245-2305-5
- Verein "Basler Fussballarchiv" Homepage
- A portrait (in German) on FCB internet
