= Kjetil Holvik =

Norwegian footballer (born 1981)

Personal information
- Date of birth: 23 January 1981 (age 45)
- Height: 1.84 m (6 ft 0 in)
- Position: Defender

Youth career
- –1996: Tornado
- 1998–2000: Rosenborg

Senior career*
Years	Team	Apps	(Gls)
1997–1998	Tornado		
2000	Rosenborg	0	(0)
2001	→ Byåsen (loan)	19	(1)
2002–2007	Sogndal	53	(1)

International career
1996–1997	Norway U15	13	(4)
1997	Norway U16	2	(0)
1998	Norway U17	7	(0)
1998	Norway U18	2	(0)
- * Club domestic league appearances and goals

Kjetil Holvik (born 23 January 1981) is a retired Norwegian footballer who played as a defender. He played in Norway's highest league Eliteserien for Sogndal, having been scouted as a teenager by Rosenborg.

== Career ==
Hailing from Måløy, Holvik started his career in Tornado FK. He made his international debut for Norway U15 during a tournament in Oppland, and continued with qualification matches for the 1997 UEFA European Under-16 Championship. In 1997 he played together with Azar Karadas in central defense as Norway won a Nordic U16 Championship. Afterwards, he was invited to the Manchester United Academy to train in October 1997, including one training with the Reserves. He turned down "an offer" from SC Heerenveen, but also trained with Rosenborg BK.

On the club level, Holvik played on the senior team of Tornado in 1997. Ahead of the 1998 season, he had offers from Molde FK and Rosenborg BK, and chose the latter. The transfer was effective from July 1998. That year he also participated in the 1998 UEFA European Under-16 Championship.

Shortly after joining Rosenborg, Holvik was injured and needed surgery. His national team career was cut short; he missed most of 1999 and 2000, and in 2001 he was sent on a season-long loan to Byåsen IL. Byåsen were relegated from the 2001 1. divisjon, and Holvik was allowed to quit and move to Sogndal IL. He made his Eliteserien debut in April 2002 against Moss. (Note: Kjetil Holvik at the Norwegian Football Federation (in Norwegian))

In late 2003 he underwent meniscus surgery. In conjunction with several of his three knee surgeries, the doctors advised him to stop playing football. A fourth surgery followed in June 2004. After leaving the field in a game in late August 2004, Holvik had to sit out 20 months of football, missing the entire 2005 season before he finally returned to play a league game in April 2006. Having played regularly in 2006, he missed the winter of 2006–07 due to yet another injury. He left Sogndal in late 2007 and took a civil job in Måløy.

In 2009 he was a boys' coach in Tornado. He was later director of sports in the same club.

== Personal life ==
Holvik is a Arsenal supporter.
