= Sergio Sagarzazu =

Argentine footballer

Personal information
- Full name: Sergio Sagarzazu
- Date of birth: 11 September 1987 (age 39)
- Place of birth: Buenos Aires, Argentina
- Height: 1.74 m (5 ft 8 1/2 in)
- Position: Midfielder

Team information
- Current team: Deportivo Mandiyu

Youth career
- Excursionistas
- River Plate

Senior career*
Years	Team	Apps	(Gls)
2007–2008	SV Wilhelmshaven	38	(1)
2008–2012	San Martín Tucumán	0	(0)
2009	→ Estudiantes BA (loan)	16	(0)
2009–2011	→ Unión Sunchales (loan)	33	(2)
2012	Chacarita Juniors	9	(0)
2013	Crucero del Norte	15	(1)
2013–2014	Gimnasia Concepción	28	(5)
2014–2015	Guaraní Antonio Franco	51	(2)
2016–2017	San Martín SJ	6	(1)
2017–2018	Juventud Unida	22	(1)
2018–2019	Los Andes	16	(0)
2019–	Sarmiento de Resistencia	72	(13)
- * Club domestic league appearances and goals as of 16:38, 14 August 2022 (UTC)

Sergio Sagarzazu (born 11 September 1987) is an Argentine professional footballer who plays as a midfielder for Sarmiento de Resistencia.

== Career ==
Sagarzazu played for Excursionistas and River Plate in his youth career. He departed the latter in 2007 to join German Regionalliga Nord side SV Wilhelmshaven. He made his debut on 4 March 2007 against Bayer Leverkusen II, before scoring his first goal a week later versus Kickers Emden. The club were relegated at the conclusion of 2006–07. He spent one season in Oberliga Nord, making twenty-seven appearances as SV Wilhelmshaven were promoted back up to tier four. He departed in 2008 after two years and thirty-eight appearances for the Germans, though controversy arose three years later.

Sagarzazu's ex-clubs, Excursionistas and River Plate, filed a lawsuit with FIFA over unpaid bonuses; which his club denied. In 2014, FIFA sided with the aforementioned teams and SV Wilhelmshaven were relegated from the 2013–14 Regionalliga. Two years later, in 2016, the Federal Court of Justice and Oberlandesgericht cleared SV Wilhelmshaven of any wrongdoing. After leaving German football in 2008, Sagarzazu subsequently joined San Martín (T). However, despite spending four years with San Martín (T), he never played for them; instead, being loaned out on two occasions.

Firstly to Estudiantes, and then to Unión Sunchales. For the two clubs, he featured forty-nine times and scored twice. After leaving San Martín (T), he had spells with Chacarita Juniors, Crucero del Norte, Gimnasia y Esgrima and Guaraní Antonio Franco between 2012 and 2015. On 6 January 2016, San Martín (SJ) of the Argentine Primera División signed Sagarzazu. His debut arrived against Godoy Cruz on 23 April, which was followed by a goal in appearance two versus Atlético Tucumán on 13 May. He played six further matches for San Martín (SJ) before departing ahead of 2017–18.

For the 2017–18 campaign, Sagarzazu spent it in Primera B Nacional with Juventud Unida. One goal in twenty-two games occurred for Sagarzazu, in a season which ended in relegation. On 23 May 2018, Primera B Nacional's Los Andes became Sagarzazu's eleventh senior club.

== Career statistics ==
As of 26 May 2018

Appearances and goals by club, season and competition
Club	Season	League			Cup		League Cup		Continental		Other		Total	
Club	Season	Division	Apps	Goals	Apps	Goals	Apps	Goals	Apps	Goals	Apps	Goals	Apps	Goals
SV Wilhelmshaven	2006–07	Regionalliga Nord	11	1	0	0	—		—		0	0	11	1
SV Wilhelmshaven	2007–08	Oberliga Nord	27	0	1	0	—		—		0	0	28	0
SV Wilhelmshaven	Total		38	1	1	0	—		—		0	0	39	1
San Martín (T)	2008–09	Primera División	0	0	0	0	—		—		0	0	0	0
San Martín (T)	2009–10	Primera B Nacional	0	0	0	0	—		—		0	0	0	0
San Martín (T)	2010–11	Primera B Nacional	0	0	0	0	—		—		0	0	0	0
San Martín (T)	2011–12	Primera B Nacional	0	0	0	0	—		—		0	0	0	0
San Martín (T)	Total		0	0	0	0	—		—		0	0	0	0
Estudiantes (loan)	2008–09	Primera B Metropolitana	16	0	0	0	—		—		0	0	16	0
Chacarita Juniors	2012–13	Primera B Metropolitana	9	0	0	0	—		—		0	0	9	0
Crucero del Norte	2012–13	Primera B Nacional	15	1	0	0	—		—		0	0	15	1
Gimnasia y Esgrima	2013–14	Torneo Argentino A	28	5	5	0	—		—		0	0	33	5
Guaraní Antonio Franco	2014	Primera B Nacional	17	1	0	0	—		—		0	0	17	1
Guaraní Antonio Franco	2015	Primera B Nacional	34	1	2	0	—		—		0	0	36	1
Guaraní Antonio Franco	Total		51	2	2	0	—		—		0	0	53	2
San Martín (SJ)	2016	Primera División	2	1	1	0	—		—		0	0	3	1
San Martín (SJ)	2016–17	Primera División	4	0	1	0	—		—		0	0	5	0
San Martín (SJ)	Total		6	1	2	0	—		—		0	0	8	1
Juventud Unida	2017–18	Primera B Nacional	22	1	1	0	—		—		0	0	23	1
Career total			185	11	11	0	—		—		0	0	196	11
