= Christian Reinwald =

Swiss footballer (born 1964)

Personal information
- Date of birth: 16 October 1964 (age 62)
- Position: Goalkeeper

Senior career*
| Years | Team | Apps | (Gls) |
| 1984–1985 | St. Gallen | 0 | (0) |
| 1989–1990 | Chur | 36 | (0) |
| 1990–1991 | Grasshopper Club | 0 | (0) |
| 1991–1992 | Winterthur | 31 | (0) |
| 1992–1993 | Basel | 35 | (0) |
- * Club domestic league appearances and goals

Christian Reinwald (born 16 October 1964) is a retired Swiss football goalkeeper who played in the 1980s and 90s.

== Football career ==
In the 1984–85 Nationalliga A season Reinwald was the reserve goalkeeper for St. Gallen, but never appeared in a league match. He played some games in the Swiss Cup. In the 1989–90 season he signed for Chur, who at that time played in the Nationalliga B, the second tier of Swiss football. Reinwald was first choice goalkeeper and played in all the 36 league matches. For the 1990–91 Nationalliga A season he signed for Grasshopper Club as reserve keeper. At the end of the season the club won the Swiss Championship. Reinwald did not play in a league match, but he did play in the Swiss Cup. For the 1991–92 season Reinwald transferred to Winterthur in the Nationalliga B as was first choice goalkeeper.

Reinwald joined Basel for their 1992–93 season under head coach Friedel Rausch. After playing in three test games Reinwald played his domestic league debut for his new club in the away game in the Stadion Brühl on 18 July 1992 as Basel lost 0–1 against Grenchen. Reinwald was first choice goalkeeper and missed just one of their 36 league matches. In the qualifying phase Reinwald held 17 clean sheets in the 22 matches and the team conceded just 10 goals. However, conceding 17 in the 10 games in the second phase they missed promotion by four points.

He stayed with the club just this one season and during this time Reinwald played a total of 50 games for Basel. 35 of these games were in the Nationalliga A, 5 in the Swiss Cup and 10 were friendly games.

== Sources ==
- Rotblau: Jahrbuch Saison 2017/2018. Publisher: FC Basel Marketing AG. ISBN 978-3-7245-2189-1
- Die ersten 125 Jahre. Publisher: Josef Zindel im Friedrich Reinhardt Verlag, Basel. ISBN 978-3-7245-2305-5
- Verein "Basler Fussballarchiv" Homepage
