= Sergei Gorokhov =

Russian footballer

Personal information
- Full name: Sergei Vasilyevich Gorokhov
- Date of birth: 12 November 1981 (age 44)
- Height: 1.83 m (6 ft 0 in)
- Position: Forward

Senior career*
Years	Team	Apps	(Gls)
1997–1998	FC Alania Vladikavkaz	0	(0)
1997–1998	→ FC Alania-d Vladikavkaz (loan)	32	(4)
1999	FC Dynamo Stavropol	9	(0)
2000	FC Zhemchuzhina Sochi	3	(1)
2000	FC Avtodor Vladikavkaz	8	(0)
2001	FC Zhemchuzhina Sochi	4	(0)
2001	FC Alania Vladikavkaz	0	(0)
2002	FC Metallurg Krasnoyarsk	8	(0)
- * Club domestic league appearances and goals

Sergei Vasilyevich Gorokhov (Russian: Сергей Васильевич Горохов; born 12 November 1981) is a former Russian football player.

== Club career ==
He played 3 seasons in the Russian Football National League for FC Dynamo Stavropol, FC Zhemchuzhina Sochi and FC Metallurg Krasnoyarsk.

== International career ==
He represented Russia at the 1998 UEFA European Under-16 Championship.

== Refereeing career ==
After retiring as a player, he worked as an assistant referee in the Russian Professional Football League from 2005 to 2009.
