= Kay Stisi =

German footballer

Personal information
- Date of birth: 12 June 1971 (age 55)
- Height: 1.91 m (6 ft 3 in)
- Position: Forward

Senior career*
Years	Team	Apps	(Gls)
–1994	TSV Eltingen		
1994–1996	FC St. Pauli	14	(1)
1996–1997	VfB Lübeck	12	(1)
–2000	BV Cloppenburg		
2000–2002	VfB Oldenburg		
2002–2004	SV Wilhelmshaven		

Managerial career
- 2004–2007: SV Wilhelmshaven (assistant)
- 2007: SV Wilhelmshaven
- * Club domestic league appearances and goals

Kay Stisi (born 12 June 1971) is a German former professional footballer who played as a forward. He played Bundesliga with St. Pauli. In 1995 he trialled with Stabæk together with teammate Andreas Mayer, but only Mayer secured a transfer.
