= Pierre-André Schürmann =

Swiss footballer and manager (born 1960)

Personal information
- Date of birth: 5 July 1960 (age 66)
- Place of birth: Port-Valais, Switzerland
- Height: 1.70 m (5 ft 7 in)
- Position: Midfielder

Senior career*
Years	Team	Apps	(Gls)
1979–1980	FC Sion	1	
1981–1983	FC Monthey	59	(21)
1983–1984	Chiasso	29	(2)
1984–1986	Vevey-Sports	58	(23)
1986–1992	Lausanne-Sport	164	(37)
1992–1993	FC Basel	34	(6)
1994–1995	FC Wil	37	(7)

Managerial career
- 1994–1997: FC Wil
- 1998–2001: Lausanne-Sport
- 2001–2009: Switzerland (Youth teams)
- 2009–2010: Neuchâtel Xamax
- 2012: Tavriya Simferopol Reserves (Youth teams)
- 2012–2013: FC Sion
- 2014–2016: Algeria U23
- 2018–2019: Zamalek (assistant)
- * Club domestic league appearances and goals

Pierre-André Schürmann (born 5 July 1960) is a Swiss football manager and former player. During his playing career, He played for FC Sion, FC Monthey, Chiasso, Vevey-Sports, Lausanne-Sport, FC Basel and FC Wil.

== Playing career ==
Schürmann was born in Port-Valais, Switzerland.

Schürmann advanced to FC Sion's first team during the 1979–80 Nationalliga A season, but he made only two appearances in that season, so he moved on to FC Monthey in the second tier of Swiss football for the following two seasons. He then played one seasons for Chiasso and two for Vevey-Sports before he moved on to Lausanne-Sport. He stayed with LS for six seasons.

Schürmann joined FC Basel's first team for their 1992–93 season under head-coach Friedel Rausch. After playing in five test games Schürmann played his domestic league debut for the club in the away game on 18 July 1992 as Basel were defeated 1–0 by Grenchen. He scored his first goal for his club one week later on 21 July in the home game in the Stadion Schützenmatte. It was the first goal of the game as Basel won 2–0 against Etoile Carouge.

During Basel's 1993–94 season, under head-coach Claude Andrey, his teammates were the likes of Swiss international goalkeeper Stefan Huber, defenders Massimo Ceccaroni, Marco Walker and Samir Tabakovic, the midfielders Mario Cantaluppi, Martin Jeitziner, Admir Smajić and Ørjan Berg and the Swiss international strikers Dario Zuffi and Philippe Hertig. Together they won the promotion/relegation group and became Nationalliga B champions and thus won promotion to the top flight of Swiss football. This after six seasons in the second tier.

Schürmann stayed with the club for two seasons. During this time Schürmann played a total of 59 games for Basel scoring a total of eight goals. 34 of these games were in the Nationalliga B, six in the Swiss Cup and 19 were friendly games. He scored six goals in the domestic league and the other two were scored in the cup.

Following his time with Basel, Schürmann moved on to play for Wil.

== Managerial career ==
Schürmann became player-manager of FC Wil in 1994. He played with them in that position for four seasons and then ended his playing career. He then went on to coach Lausanne Sports. He has been working in the SFV's youth set-up since 2000. He was part of the coaching staff behind Switzerlands victory in the 2002 UEFA European Under-17 Championship. He helped the Switzerland U19s reach the semi-finals in Switzerland in 2004.

Schürmann was appointed as manager of the Switzerland national under-21 team on 18 July 2007.

In June 2009, he joined Neuchâtel Xamax and on 14 April 2010 after four consecutive league defeats, Neuchatel Xamax officials sacked and replaced him with the club's junior squad coach Jean-Michel Aeby.

In April 2018 he was one of 77 applicants for the vacant Cameroon national team job.

== Sources ==
- Die ersten 125 Jahre. Publisher: Josef Zindel im Friedrich Reinhardt Verlag, Basel. ISBN 978-3-7245-2305-5
- Verein "Basler Fussballarchiv" Homepage
