= David McMahon (association footballer) =

Irish footballer (born 1981)

Personal information
- Full name: David McMahon
- Date of birth: 17 January 1981 (age 45)
- Place of birth: Dublin, Ireland
- Height: 6 ft 2 in (1.88 m)
- Position: Forward

Youth career
- 19??–1997: Tolka Rovers
- 1997–2000: Newcastle United

Senior career*
Years	Team	Apps	(Gls)
2000–2001	Newcastle United	0	(0)
2000	→ Falkirk (loan)	3	(0)
2000–2001	→ Darlington (loan)	8	(1)
2001	Durham City		
2001	Bangor		
2001–2002	Queen of the South	1	(0)
2002–2003	Blyth Spartans		
2003–2004	Whitley Bay		(16)
2004–2005	Newcastle Blue Star		
2005–2006	Ryton		
2006–2007	Bedlington Terriers		(1)
2007–200?	Ashington		

International career
1997	Ireland U15		
1998	Ireland U16		
1998–1999	Ireland U17	8	(6)
1998–2000	Ireland U18		
Medal record
Men's football
Representing Republic of Ireland
UEFA Euro U-16
Winner	1998 Scotland
- * Club domestic league appearances and goals

David McMahon (born 17 January 1981) is an Irish former footballer who played as a forward for Darlington in the Football League and for Falkirk and Queen of the South in the Scottish League. He also appeared in the Irish League for Bangor, and in English non-league football for Durham City, Blyth Spartans, Whitley Bay, Newcastle Blue Star, Ryton, Bedlington Terriers and Ashington.

Internationally, McMahon represented the Republic of Ireland at levels up to under-18. He scored the winning goal as Ireland's under-16 team won the 1998 UEFA European Under-16 Championship.

== Club career ==
=== Early career ===
McMahon was born in Dublin, and comes from the Finglas district. He began his football career as a youngster with nearby Tolka Rovers, and signed for Newcastle United in 1997. He played for Newcastle's junior teams, and was given a first-team squad number for the 2000–01 season.

In September 2000, he joined Scottish Division One club Falkirk on loan for a month to gain experience of first-team football. He went straight into the starting eleven for Falkirk's League Cup match against Hibernian, and opened the scoring in the 75th minute with a powerful header, but the Scottish Premier League leaders won 2–1 after extra time. He contributed to a 2–1 defeat of Raith Rovers in the league, and crossed for Gareth Hutchison's opening goal as Falkirk won at Ross County, before returning to Newcastle.

=== Darlington ===
In December 2000, McMahon joined Football League Third Division club Darlington on loan for the remainder of the season. He made his debut as a second-half substitute in a 1–0 defeat at Leyton Orient, and scored his first goal in the next match, heading home Martin Gray's cross to open the scoring in a 3–0 win at home to Lincoln City. Ahead of the Football League Trophy visit to York City in January 2001, McMahon agreed with manager Gary Bennett's suggestion that he had not been at his best; he responded by producing a run that forced a York defender to bring him down for a penalty kick, and then, collecting the ball from a throw-in with his back to goal on the edge of York's penalty area, he "turned and sent a left-foot curler past the outstretched hand" of the goalkeeper for Darlington's third goal. As the club brought in other forwards during the season, including David Brightwell, Steve Harper and Clint Marcelle, McMahon lost his place. His last of eleven appearances in all competitions was on 24 February as a substitute. When his Newcastle contract expired at the end of the season, the club released him on a free transfer.

=== Return to Ireland ===
He returned to Ireland where he trained with Shelbourne during pre-season, but came back to England and played briefly for Northern League club Durham City before joining Bohemians on an ultimately unsuccessful trial. Before a deal could be done, he signed a short-term contract with Irish League First Division club Bangor instead. McMahon showed up well on his Bangor debut, a 3–0 win against Limavady United; manager Lee Doherty was complimentary about his movement. He scored his first goal for the club in the County Antrim Shield, but Bangor lost the match to amateur club East Belfast. In the next league game, Bangor only drew at home to Carrick Rangers as McMahon's 87th-minute penalty was saved.

=== Later career ===
His next club was Scottish Division Two Queen of the South in mid-December 2001, but bad weather restricted his playing time to just 13 minutes in his month's contract, and he was released. He finished the season back in England with Northern Premier League club Blyth Spartans. McMahon scored twice against Lancaster City in the second qualifying round of the 2002–03 FA Cup, but was unable to help his side get past Runcorn to reach the first round proper. Another two goals helped Blyth eliminate North Ferriby United from the FA Trophy, and he scored again against Moor Green in the next round.

McMahon spent the 2003–04 season in the Northern League with Whitley Bay, and helped Newcastle Blue Star gain promotion to the Northern League First Division in 2004–05. He went on to play for Ryton in the Northern League Second Division, and for Bedlington Terriers and Ashington in the First.

== International career ==
McMahon "scored in almost every match at under-15 level" in 1997, and the following season, he was a member of the Ireland team that qualified for the 1998 UEFA European Under-16 Championship. In the qualifying tournament, he scored in the 2–1 win against Belgium, and a goalless draw against Northern Ireland was enough for Ireland to top the group on goals scored. In the championships proper, Ireland were grouped with Finland, Scotland and Spain. Described by the Irish Times' Paul Buttner as "so unfortunate not to have scored" in Ireland's first two group games, McMahon was "the deserving hero" as he headed Brendan McGill's cross home for the only goal of the match against Spain that confirmed qualification for the quarter-finals. He was involved in both goals as Ireland beat Denmark 2–0, but received his second yellow card of the tournament, which meant he was suspended for the semi-final. Despite his absence, Ireland beat Portugal 2–0 to become the first Irish football team to reach the final of a major championship, in which they faced Italy. According to the Irish Times, "McMahon, given a torrid time throughout the game by his marker Maurizio Lanzaro, lost him for a moment and was there in the right place at the right time to tap the ball home from just yards." He said he had not played well, "but I scored the winner in the final of the European Championship, so I'm not complaining." The team returned to a welcome from thousands of supporters at Dublin Airport and to praise from President Mary McAleese and Taoiseach Bertie Ahern.

In September 1998, he was called up to the under-18 team for the first time, to add physicality to the squad ahead of their European Championship qualifying stage. He played once, coming on to partner Gary Doherty as a substitute in the third group match with Ireland needing to beat Russia to qualify for the play-off round – Colin Healy scored the winner in the 90th minute – but played no further part as Ireland went on to finish third in the 1999 Championship.

He was top scorer with four goals in five appearances as Ireland under-17s finished second in a six-team invitational tournament in Israel in December 1998 and January 1999. Despite McMahon's two goals in three matches, the second bringing his scoring record to 16 goals from 26 youth internationals, Ireland U17 failed to progress past the group stage of the 1999 Meridian Cup. Later that year he played for the under-18s in a friendly against Germany, in the European qualifier against Malta, and in the second leg of the 2000 European Championship play-off defeat against France.

== Style of play ==
McMahon is a tall man, and reached his full height of 6 ft 2 in (1.88 m) while still a youngster. The Irish Times' preview of the European Under-16 final described him as an "excellent targetman who makes a nuisance of himself". He learnt much about the role of striker from watching England international Alan Shearer in training, but likened himself more to Newcastle's Scotland international Duncan Ferguson, "because I am taller and like to battle for things in the air." Brian Kerr, then manager of Ireland under-17s, described McMahon as honest and hard-working, "not the most skilful player, but will get goals", but Darlington manager Gary Bennett believed there was more to his game: that he and strike partner John Williams both had enough skill to play a passing game and "hold the ball well up front without us hitting long balls towards them".
