= Ihor Bendovskyi =

Ukrainian footballer (born 1981)

Personal information
- Date of birth: 6 October 1981 (age 45)
- Place of birth: Odesa, Soviet Union
- Height: 1.78 m (5 ft 10 in)
- Position: Midfielder

Youth career
- 1997–1999: Chornomorets Odesa

Senior career*
Years	Team	Apps	(Gls)
1999–2002	Borussia Dortmund II	70	(8)
2002–2003	Borussia Fulda	14	(0)
2003–2004	Fortuna Köln	12	(0)
2004–2007	Bayer Leverkusen II	53	(4)
2007–2008	Dynamo Dresden	28	(1)
2009	SV Wilhelmshaven	7	(0)
2010	Rot-Weiss Essen	12	(0)
2010–2012	KFC Uerdingen		
2012–2013	SC Odesa		
2013–2014	SC Hassel		

International career
1998	Ukraine-16	6	(2)
2000	Ukraine-18	8	(3)
Medal record
Men's football
Representing Ukraine
UEFA European Under-18 Championship
Runner-up	2000 Germany
- * Club domestic league appearances and goals

Ihor Bendovskyi (Ukrainian: Ігор Васильович Бендовський; born 6 October 1981) is a Ukrainian former professional footballer who played as a midfielder. (Note: Ihor Bendovskyi at WorldFootball.net)
