= Carlos Coria =

Swiss footballer (born 1961)

Personal information
- Date of birth: 13 May 1961 (age 65)
- Position: Midfielder

Senior career*
Years	Team	Apps	(Gls)
1982–1984	FC Fribourg		
1987–1993	FC Bulle		
- * Club domestic league appearances and goals

Carlos Coria (born 13 May 1961) is a retired Swiss football midfielder.
