= Martin Thalmann =

Swiss footballer (born 1972)

Personal information
- Date of birth: 5 September 1972 (age 54)
- Place of birth: Switzerland
- Position: Defender

Youth career
- FC Basel

Senior career*
| Years | Team | Apps | (Gls) |
| 1990–1992 | FC Basel | 5 | (0) |
| 1992–1995 | FC Riehen | | |
| 1995–1997 | TSF Ditzingen | | |
| 1997–1998 | Waldhof Mannheim | | |
| 1998–2001 | Schaffhausen | | |
- * Club domestic league appearances and goals

Martin Thalmann (born 5 September 1972) is a Swiss former professional footballer who played in the 1990s and early 2000s. He played mainly in the position as defender, but also as midfielder.

== Career ==
Thalmann came through the youth system of FC Basel and advanced to their U-21 team 1990. He was called up to their first team many times in their 1990–91 season under head coach Ernst August Künnecke. He played his domestic league debut for the club in the home game in the St. Jakob Stadium on 22 December 1990 as Basel won 6–2 against Schaffhausen. In that season he played just two league matches. In the following season he was also called into their first team and had three appearances for them. Thalmann left FCB in the summer of 1992 and moved to FC Riehen.

In his two seasons with the club Thalmann played a total of 11 games for Basel's first team without scoring a goal. Five of these games were in the Nationalliga A and six were friendly games.

Thalmann later played for the German teams TSF Ditzingen and Waldhof Mannheim before moving to Schaffhausen in 1998, who at that time played in the second tier of Swiss football. In the 2000–01 season Schaffhausen suffered relegation.

== Sources ==
- Die ersten 125 Jahre. Publisher: Josef Zindel im Friedrich Reinhardt Verlag, Basel. ISBN 978-3-7245-2305-5
- Verein "Basler Fussballarchiv" Homepage
