= SV Wilhelmshaven =

German football club

- Full name: Sport-Verein Wilhelmshaven Germania 1905 e. V.
- Founded: 1905
- Ground: Jadestadion
- Capacity: 7500
- Chairman: Dr. Hans Herrnberger
- Manager: Dario Fossi
- League: Oberliga Niedersachsen (V)
- 2025–26: Oberliga Niedersachsen, 5th of 16
- Website: www.svwilhelmshaven.de
Home colours	Away colours

SV Wilhelmshaven is a German association football club from Wilhelmshaven, Lower Saxony. SV Wilhelmshaven play in the Regionalliga Nord. SV Wilhelmshaven was founded in 1905. Since 1999, Wilhelmshaven's stadium is the Jadestadion.

== History ==
Predecessor side SpVgg Wilhelmshaven was formed as FC Comet in 1905 and was quickly renamed FC Deutschland Wilhelmshaven. In 1912 this club was joined by Heppenser BSV, and later, in 1924, merged with VfB Wilhelmshaven to become Wilhelmshavener SV 1906.

In 1939, SV 06 merged with VfL 1905 Rüstringen to create SpVgg Wilhelmshaven. This side immediately won promotion to the first division Gauliga Niedersachsen, one of sixteen top flight divisions created in the re-organization of German football under the Third Reich in 1933. After the division was split in 1942, the club captured two consecutive titles in the newly formed Gauliga Weser-Ems in 1943 and 1944, but was unable to advance past the eighth-final round in the national playoffs.

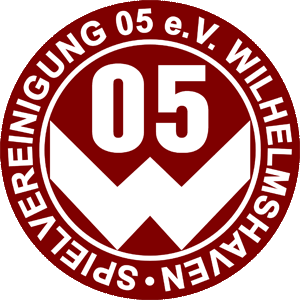
Logo of predecessor side SpVgg Wilhelmshaven

In the aftermath of World War II, SpVgg was disbanded as were most other organizations in Germany, including sports and football associations. It was not until 1952 that the club was resurrected. In 1972, they were joined by TSV Germania to form an association under the current name SV Wilhelmshaven.

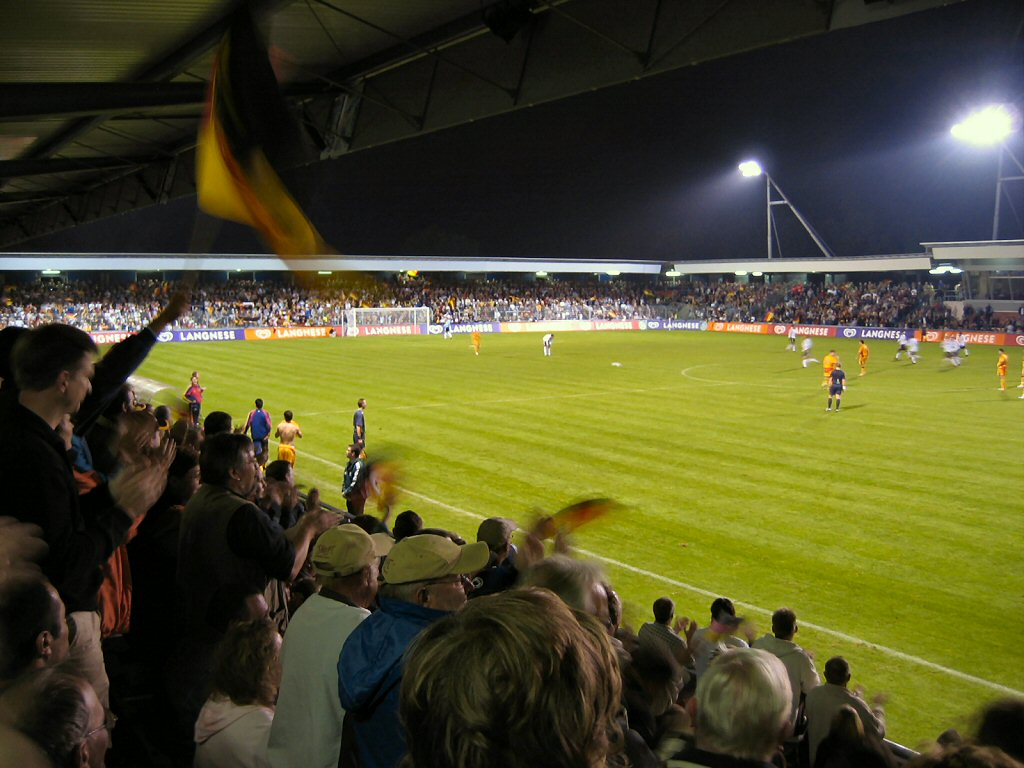
The Jadestadion

The combined club spent its first three seasons in the Regionalliga Nord (II)/2.Bundesliga Nord, but then fell to the third tier Amateur Oberliga Nord. SV was relegated to the Verbandsliga Niedersachsen (IV) for the first time in 1980 and since then has played as an elevator side moving between the third and fourth divisions.

In 1992, SVW merged with TSR Olympia Wilhelmshaven, but TSR's footballers left to play on their own on the local city circuit. SVW then had a brush with bankruptcy in 2000, and after being refused permission by the German Football Association for a merger that would have seen the return of Olympia's footballers, was forcibly sent down in spite of a respectable finish well clear of relegation.

SV Wilhelmshaven performed well in the Oberliga Nord (IV) and a division championship in 2005–06 returned the team to the Regionalliga Nord (III), briefly ending a five-year stay in the fourth division. The club finished last there in the following season and returned to Oberliga play. SV enjoyed a successful 2007–08 campaign and, on the strength of a third-place finish, qualified for play in what will become the fourth division Regionalliga after the introduction of the new 3. Liga in 2008–09. It spent six seasons in the Regionalliga until 2014 when it was demoted to the tier six Landesliga Weser-Ems. The clubs suffered another relegation, now to the Bezirksliga, after the 2015–16 season.

== FIFA lawsuit ==
SV Wilhelmshaven filed a lawsuit against FIFA, the international governing body of football, regarding the signing in 2007 of free transfer Sergio Sagarzazu. Sagarzazu played 38 times for the club over a year and a half. However, Sagarzazu's former clubs River Plate and Excursionistas filed for compensation in the amount of 157,000 Euros, which is allowed under FIFA's regulations. SV Wilhelmshaven refused to pay, claiming that such fees violated German law. FIFA demanded that the German FA deduct six points from Wilhelmshaven in the 2011–12 season. Despite this deduction, SV Wilhelmshaven managed to avoid relegation from the Regionalliga Nord.

FIFA imposed another six-point deduction in 2012–13 for lack of payment, but again, the club avoided relegation as two other teams went bankrupt. FIFA demanded that the German FA relegate SV Wilhelmshaven for lack of payment following the 2013–14 season. SV Wilhelmshaven filed suit against FIFA in German court to overturn the relegation order, stating that a German Court decision (from 2004) that the payment of training compensation was a restraint of trade under European law of free choice of employment meant that they did not have to pay such compensation. The club were relegated at the end of 2013–14. Months after, the Federal Court of Justice and Oberlandesgericht cleared SV Wilhelmshaven of any wrongdoing.

== Honours ==
The club's honours:

- Oberliga Nord
  - Champions: 2006
- Verbandsliga Niedersachsen
  - Champions: 1994

== Notable players ==
- (Brazil) Renato Bernardi Bauer
- Cyrille Florent Bella – played one game for the Cameroon national football team
- (Canada) Jonathan Beaulieu-Bourgault – played for the Canadian national U-20 team at 2007 FIFA U-20 World Cup
- (Canada) Riley O'Neill – played for the Canadian national U-20 team at 2005 FIFA World Youth Championship
- (Republic of the Congo) Christ Bongo – former member of the Congo national football team
- Rohan Ricketts - former Premier League, Football League Championship and Major League Soccer player & former member of the England national under-20 football team
- Heiko Bonan – former member of the East Germany national football team
- Dirk Schuster – former member of the East Germany and Germany national football team
- (Germany) Daniel Farke – former Premier League and Bundesliga manager
- (Germany) Mike Barten
- Fabian Lucassen – played five games for the Germany U-19 team
- George Alhassan – former member of the Ghana national under-20 football team
- Valdas Ivanauskas – former member of the Lithuania national football team
- Romanus Stonkus – former member of the Lithuania national football team who presented his country in twenty-one game and scores one goal
- Vidmantas Vysniauskas – former member of the who played two games for the Lithuania national football team
- Paweł Kryszałowicz – played in the FIFA World Cup 2002 with the Poland national football team
- (Slovakia) Jozef Kotula
- Karol Praženica – played five games for the Slovakia national football team
- (Slovakia) Richard Slezak
- Igor Bendovskyi – former Ukraine youth international
- (United States) Marcus Storey – played formerly in the US Major League Soccer
- (Sweden) Igor Krulj – former Swedish youth international and Allsvenskan
- Ben Starkie - Truro City midfielder and full international for Tanzania national team

== Former coaches ==
- (Germany) Hans-Werner Moors (31.10.1999 – 30.06.2002)
- (Germany) Wolfgang Steinbach (01.07.2002 – 04.04.2007)
- (Germany) Kay Stisi (05.04.2007 – 07.09.2007)
- (Bosnia and Herzegovina) Ivica Josić (07.09.2007 – 14.09.2007)
- (Croatia) Predrag Uzelac (14.09.2007 – 22.09.2008)
- (Croatia) Boris Ekmeščić (23.09.2008 – 04.04.2009)
