= Aleksandr Gorin =

Russian footballer

Personal information
- Full name: Aleksandr Vladimirovich Gorin
- Date of birth: 7 January 1981 (age 45)
- Place of birth: Bereznyagovka, Russian SFSR
- Height: 1.81 m (5 ft 11 1/2 in)
- Position: Defender

Senior career*
Years	Team	Apps	(Gls)
1999–2000	FC Torpedo-2 Moscow	27	(2)
2000–2001	FC Kryvbas Kryvyi Rih	11	(1)
2001–2003	FC Torpedo Moscow	18	(0)
2004–2006	FC Fakel Voronezh	100	(2)
2007	FC Shinnik Yaroslavl	11	(0)
2008–2009	FC Nosta Novotroitsk	62	(1)
2010	FC Salyut Belgorod	28	(0)
2011	FC Sibir Novosibirsk	4	(0)

International career
2002–2003	Russia U-21	8	(0)
- * Club domestic league appearances and goals

Aleksandr Vladimirovich Gorin (Russian: Александр Владимирович Горин; born 7 January 1981) is a Russian former professional footballer.

== Club career ==
He made his debut in the Russian Premier League in 2002 for FC Torpedo Moscow.
