= Shaun Byrne (footballer, born 1981) =

Footballer (born 1981)

Personal information
- Date of birth: 21 January 1981 (age 45)
- Place of birth: Taplow, England
- Positions: Defender; midfielder

Youth career
- West Ham United

Senior career*
Years	Team	Apps	(Gls)
1999–2004	West Ham United	2	(0)
2000	→ Bristol Rovers (loan)	2	(0)
2004	→ Swansea City (loan)	9	(0)
2004	Dublin City	4	(1)
2005	Chesham United		
2005–2006	Burnham		
2006–2009	Hemel Hempstead Town	29	(4)
2009	Slough Town	1	(1)
Total		47	(6)

International career
1998	Republic of Ireland U16		
2001–2002	Republic of Ireland U21	11	(1)
Medal record
Men's football
Representing Republic of Ireland
UEFA Euro U-16
Winner	1998 Scotland
- * Club domestic league appearances and goals

Shaun Byrne (born 21 January 1981) is a former professional footballer who played as a defender or a midfielder. Born in England, he represented the Republic of Ireland internationally at youth level.

== Club career ==
Byrne started as a trainee with West Ham United before moving to Dublin City in 2004. After four games with Dublin City he quit the team, citing the difficult transition from London to Dublin as the reason. Once free from multiple transfer binds, he trialed at various teams and then moved to Chesham United, initially on trial before joining permanently. He later played for Burnham and before transferring to Hemel Hempstead Town in March 2006 and Slough Town on 7 March 2009.

== International career ==
Byrne captained the Republic of Republic of Ireland U16 national team to victory at the 1998 UEFA European Under-16 Championship in Scotland in May 1998. He was also part of the Republic of Ireland U21.

== Honours ==
Republic of Ireland U16

- UEFA U-17 Championship: 1998
