= Simo Mouidi =

Moroccan footballer

Personal information
- Date of birth: 20 August 1967 (age 59)
- Position: Defender

Senior career*
Years	Team	Apps	(Gls)
1989–1993	FC Emmenbrücke		
1993–1994	FC St. Gallen		
1994–1999	SC Kriens		

International career
1994	Morocco	1	(0)

Managerial career
- 2007–2008: FC Witikon
- * Club domestic league appearances and goals

Simo Mouidi (born 20 August 1967) is a retired Moroccan football defender.
