= Régis Rothenbühler =

Swiss footballer (born 1970)

Personal information
- Date of birth: 11 October 1970 (age 56)
- Place of birth: Neuchâtel, Switzerland
- Height: 1.75 m (5 ft 9 in)
- Position: Defender

Senior career*
Years	Team	Apps	(Gls)
1988–1993	Neuchâtel Xamax	88	(3)
1993	Servette	12	(1)
1994–1999	Neuchâtel Xamax	167	(2)
1999–2002	Lugano	58	(2)
2002	Chiasso	12	(0)
2003	Lugano	6	(0)
2003–2004	Malcantone Agno	26	(0)
2004	Biaschesi	9	(0)
2005–2006	Fribourg	19	(0)

International career
1992–2000	Switzerland	19	(0)

Managerial career
- 2010–2011: AC Bellinzona (assistant)
- * Club domestic league appearances and goals

Régis Rothenbühler (born 11 October 1970) is a retired Swiss football player.

He played as a defender mostly for Neuchâtel Xamax and FC Lugano. He played 19 times for the Switzerland national football team and was a participant at the 1996 UEFA European Championship.
