= 1998 UEFA European Under-16 Championship =

1998 UEFA Under-16 Championship
Tournament details
- Host country: Scotland
- Dates: 26 April – 8 May
- Teams: 16 (from 1 confederation)

Final positions
- Champions: Republic of Ireland (1st title)
- Runners-up: Italy
- Third place: Spain
- Fourth place: Portugal

Tournament statistics
- Matches played: 32
- Goals scored: 70 (2.19 per match)

The 1998 UEFA European Under-16 Championship was the 16th edition of UEFA's European Under-16 Football Championship. Scotland hosted the championship, during 26 April – 8 May 1998. Players born on or after 1 January 1981 were eligible to participate in this competition (the age limit was previously in August). 16 teams entered the competition, and Republic of Ireland were unbeaten all the way to final, defeating Italy to win the competition for the first time.

== Participants ==
- Croatia
- Denmark
- Finland
- Greece
- Iceland
- Israel
- Italy
- Liechtenstein
- Norway
- Portugal
- Republic of Ireland
- Russia
- Scotland
- Spain
- Sweden
- Ukraine

== Group stage ==
=== Group A ===
Team	Pld	W	D	L	GF	GA	GD	Pts
Greece	3	2	1	0	4	0	+4	7
Denmark	3	1	2	0	2	1	+1	5
Sweden	3	0	2	1	2	4	−2	2
Iceland	3	0	1	2	1	4	−3	1

26 April 1998

Denmark	1–1	Sweden

Cumbernauld

26 April 1998

Greece	2–0	Iceland

Paisley

28 April 1998

Denmark	0–0	Greece

Cumbernauld

28 April 1998

Sweden	1–1	Iceland

Paisley

30 April 1998

Iceland	0–1	Denmark

Paisley

30 April 1998

Sweden	0–2	Greece

Cumbernauld

=== Group B ===
Team	Pld	W	D	L	GF	GA	GD	Pts
Italy	3	2	1	0	7	2	+5	7
Portugal	3	2	1	0	4	2	+2	7
Norway	3	1	0	2	7	6	+1	3
Liechtenstein	3	0	0	3	0	8	−8	0

26 April 1998

Liechtenstein	0–5	Norway

Livingston

26 April 1998

Portugal	1–1	Italy
Miguel Barros 67'		Dalla Bona 28'

Motherwell

28 April 1998

Liechtenstein	0–1	Portugal
		Miguel Barros 70'

Glasgow

28 April 1998

Norway	1–4	Italy

Motherwell

30 April 1998

Italy	2–0	Liechtenstein

Glasgow

30 April 1998

Norway	1–2	Portugal
Holm 55'		Jorge Ribeiro 5'; Miguel Barros 15'

Motherwell

=== Group C ===
Team	Pld	W	D	L	GF	GA	GD	Pts
Republic of Ireland	3	2	1	0	3	0	+3	7
Spain	3	1	1	1	2	2	0	4
Finland	3	1	0	2	2	3	−1	3
Scotland	3	0	2	1	1	3	−2	2

26 April 1998

Scotland	0–0	Republic of Ireland

Stirling

26 April 1998

Spain	1–0	Finland

Perth
Referee: Kyros Vassaras (Greece)

28 April 1998

Republic of Ireland	2–0	Finland
Reid 4'; Barrett 23'

Stirling

28 April 1998

Scotland	1–1	Spain

Perth
Referee: Herbert Fandel (Germany)

30 April 1998

Finland	2–0	Scotland

Perth

30 April 1998

Republic of Ireland	1–0	Spain
McMahon 63'

Stirling
Referee: Frank De Bleeckere (Belgium)

=== Group D ===
Team	Pld	W	D	L	GF	GA	GD	Pts
Israel	3	1	2	0	4	2	+2	5
Croatia	3	1	1	1	2	2	0	4
Ukraine	3	1	1	1	3	4	−1	4
Russia	3	0	2	1	2	3	−1	2

26 April 1998

Croatia	2–0	Ukraine

Inverness

26 April 1998

Russia	1–1	Israel
80' Lobov

Dingwall

28 April 1998

Israel	1–1	Ukraine

Dingwall

28 April 1998

Russia	0–0	Croatia

Inverness

30 April 1998

Israel	2–0	Croatia

Dingwall

30 April 1998

Ukraine	2–1	Russia
		70' Shchipkov

Inverness

== Knockout stages ==
=== Quarterfinals ===
3 May 1998

Greece	1–2	Spain

Paisley
Referee: Mike McCurry (Scotland)

3 May 1998

Republic of Ireland	2–0	Denmark
Barrett 31'; Byrne 59'

Stirling
Referee: Stéphane Bré (France)

3 May 1998

Italy	2–1	Croatia

Motherwell
Referee: Herbert Fandel (Germany)

3 May 1998

Israel	1–4	Portugal
Abuksis 67'		Lourenço 26'; Miguel Barros 44', 62'; Cândido Costa 78'

Inverness
Referee: Florin Chivulete (Romania)

=== Semifinals ===
5 May 1998

Spain	1–2	Italy

Motherwell
Referee: Erol Ersoy (Turkey)

5 May 1998

Republic of Ireland	2–0	Portugal
Byrne 53', 79'

Perth
Referee: Frank De Bleeckere (Belgium)

=== Third Place Playoff ===
8 May 1998

Spain	2–1	Portugal
Granero 33' (pen.); Aganzo 75'		Manuel José 2'

Stirling
Referee: Michal Beneš (Czech Republic)

=== Final ===
8 May 1998

Italy	1–2	Republic of Ireland
Pelanti 52'		35' Foy; 57' McMahon

McDiarmid Park, Perth
Referee: Mike McCurry (Scotland)
