= Juanjo García Granero =

Spanish footballer

Personal information
- Full name: Juan José García Granero
- Date of birth: 26 April 1981 (age 45)
- Place of birth: Madrid, Spain
- Height: 1.79 m (5 ft 10 1/2 in)
- Position: Midfielder

Youth career
- Real Madrid
- 1997–2000: Zaragoza

Senior career*
Years	Team	Apps	(Gls)
2000–2003	Zaragoza B	73	(10)
2003–2005	Zaragoza	4	(0)
2003–2004	→ Elche (loan)	30	(3)
2005–2006	Xerez	29	(1)
2007	Vecindario	12	(0)
2007–2008	Ionikos	27	(1)
2009	Universidad LP	10	(1)
2009–2010	Leganés	15	(0)
2010	Cerro Reyes		
2011–2012	Alcobendas Sport		
2012–2015	San Fernando	49	(6)

International career
1997–1998	Spain U16	12	(2)
1998–1999	Spain U17	12	(1)
1999	Spain U18	1	(0)
2001	Spain U20	1	(0)

Managerial career
- 2021: San Fernando
- 2022–2023: RC Alcobendas
- * Club domestic league appearances and goals

Juan José "Juanjo" García Granero (born 26 April 1981) is a Spanish football coach and a former player who played mainly as a left midfielder.
