= Aleksandr Klyuyev =

Russian footballer

Personal information
- Full name: Aleksandr Sergeyevich Klyuyev
- Date of birth: 3 January 1981 (age 45)
- Place of birth: Novorossiysk, Russian SFSR
- Height: 1.83 m (6 ft 0 in)
- Positions: Defender; midfielder

Youth career
- FC Chernomorets Novorossiysk

Senior career*
Years	Team	Apps	(Gls)
2000–2001	FC Spartak Kostroma	65	(0)
2002	FC Arsenal-2 Tula	34	(0)
2003–2006	FC Dynamo Bryansk	40	(1)
2006–2007	FC Nara-Desna Naro-Fominsk	56	(1)
2008	FC Dmitrov	2	(0)
2008–2009	FC Zhemchuzhina-Sochi	40	(1)
2010	FC Chernomorets Novorossiysk	12	(0)
2010	FC Gubkin	9	(0)
2012	FC Olimpia Gelendzhik	0	(0)
- * Club domestic league appearances and goals

Aleksandr Sergeyevich Klyuyev (Russian: Александр Серге́евич Клюев; born 3 January 1981) is a former Russian professional football player.

== Club career ==
He played 3 seasons in the Russian Football National League for FC Dynamo Bryansk.
