= Ron Willems =

Dutch footballer

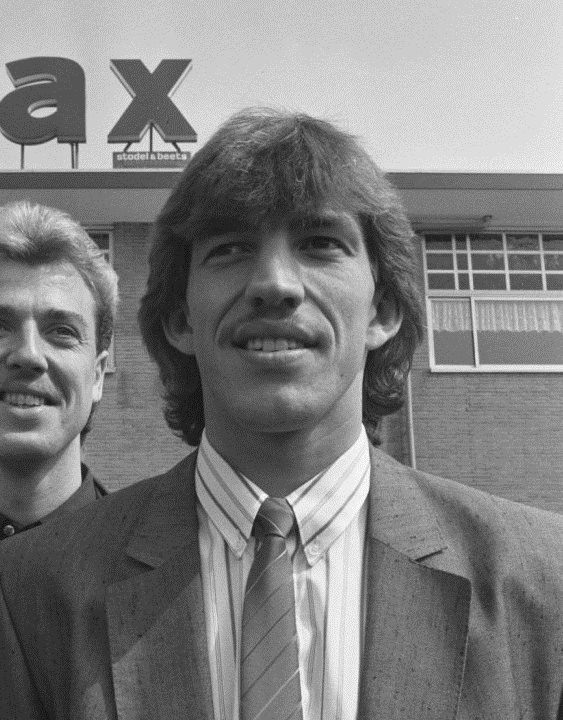
- Willems in 1988

Personal information
- Full name: Ron Willems
- Date of birth: 20 September 1966 (age 60)
- Place of birth: Vaassen, Netherlands
- Height: 1.83 m (6 ft 0 in)
- Position: Striker

Senior career*
Years	Team	Apps	(Gls)
1983–1986	PEC Zwolle	43	(7)
1986–1989	FC Twente	85	(16)
1989–1993	AFC Ajax	47	(15)
1993–1995	Grasshoppers	56	(18)
1995–1998	Derby County	59	(13)
Total		290	(69)
- * Club domestic league appearances and goals

Ron Willems (born 20 September 1966 in Vaassen, Gelderland) is a former Dutch footballer.

During his career he played for PEC Zwolle, FC Twente, AFC Ajax, Grasshopper Club Zürich, and Derby County F.C., where he made 26 appearances and scored 2 goals in the Premier League.

Following his retirement, Willems was diagnosed with schizophrenia. His relative Menno Willems was also a professional footballer.
