= Aleksandr Shchipkov (footballer) =

Russian footballer

Personal information
- Full name: Aleksandr Sergeyevich Shchipkov
- Date of birth: 6 April 1981 (age 45)
- Place of birth: Reutov, Russian SFSR
- Height: 1.86 m (6 ft 1 in)
- Positions: Forward; midfielder

Senior career*
Years	Team	Apps	(Gls)
1999–2000	FC Spartak-2 Moscow	57	(5)
2000	FC Spartak Moscow	1	(1)
2001–2003	FC Uralan Elista	23	(0)
2005–2008	FC Spartak Shchyolkovo	77	(10)
- * Club domestic league appearances and goals

Aleksandr Sergeyevich Shchipkov (Russian: Александр Серге́евич Щипков; born 6 April 1981) is a former Russian professional footballer. He made his professional debut in the Russian Second Division in 1999 for FC Spartak-2 Moscow.

== Honours ==
- Russian Premier League champion: 2000.
