= Friedel Rausch =

German football player and manager (1940–2017)

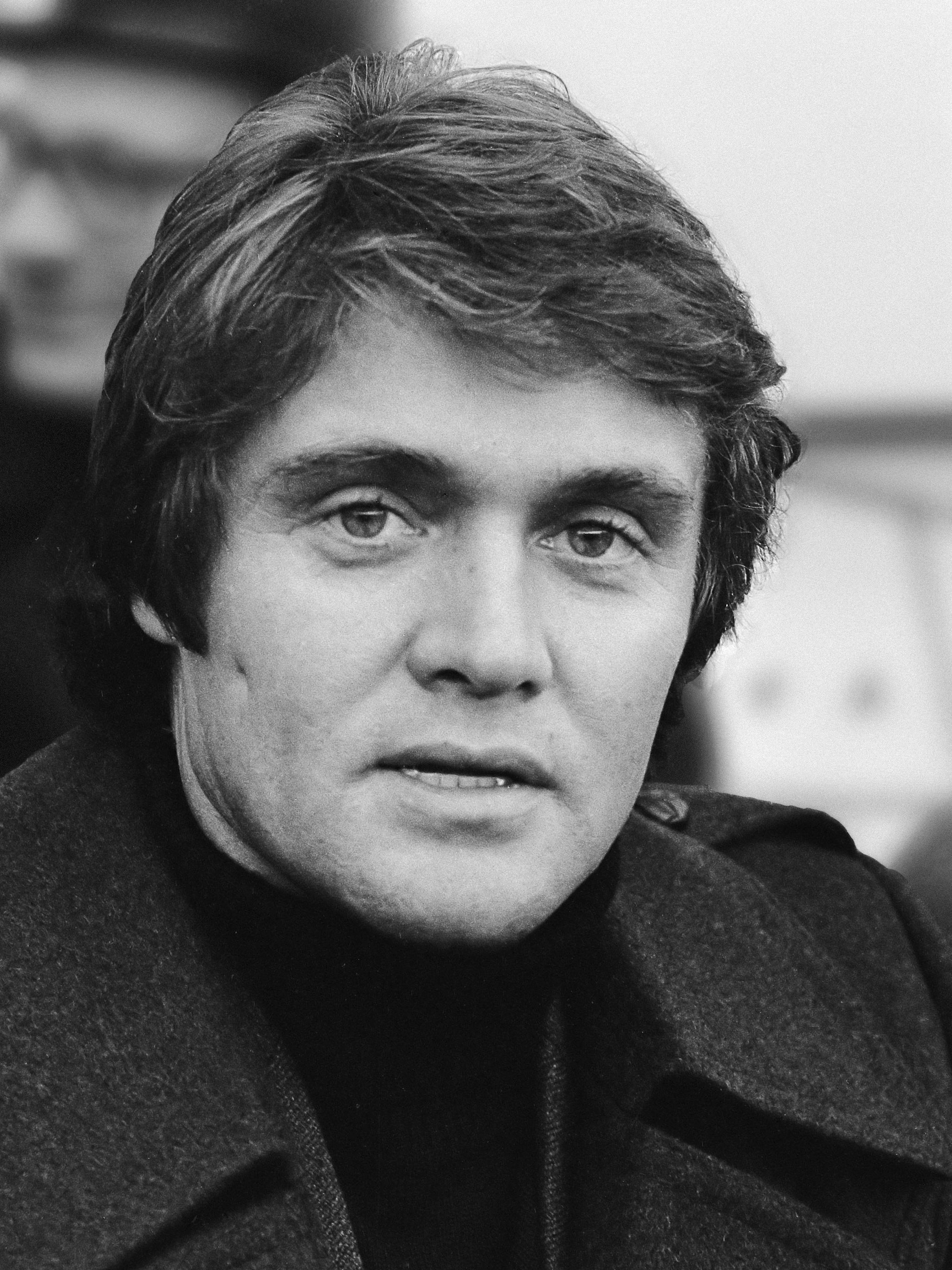
- Rausch in 1979

Personal information
- Date of birth: 27 February 1940
- Place of birth: Duisburg, Germany
- Date of death: 18 November 2017 (aged 77)
- Place of death: Horw, Switzerland
- Position: Defender

Senior career*
Years	Team	Apps	(Gls)
1961–1962	Meidericher SV		
1962–1971	Schalke 04	195	(7)

Managerial career
- 1971–1976: Schalke 04 (youth, assistant)
- 1976–1977: Schalke 04
- 1979–1980: Eintracht Frankfurt
- 1980–1982: Fenerbahçe
- 1982–1983: MVV
- 1983–1984: Iraklis Thessaloniki
- 1985–1992: FC Luzern
- 1992–1993: FC Basel
- 1993–1996: 1. FC Kaiserslautern
- 1996–1997: LASK
- 1998: Borussia Mönchengladbach
- 1998–2000: 1. FC Nürnberg
- 2001: Eintracht Frankfurt
- * Club domestic league appearances and goals

Friedel Rausch (27 February 1940 – 18 November 2017) was a German football player and manager. As a manager, he won with FC Luzern the Swiss championship in 1989 and the cup in 1992, thereby becoming the most successful manager in the club's history.

In 1969, Rausch was bitten by an Alsatian during the derby of Schalke 04 and Borussia Dortmund.

In 2006, Rausch was diagnosed with skin cancer. He died at the age of 77 on 18 November 2017.

== See also ==
- List of UEFA Cup winning managers
