= 1994–95 FC Zürich season =

FC Zürich
1994–95 season
- Owner: Sven Hotz
- Chairman: Sven Hotz
- Head-coach from then: Bob Houghton until March 1995; Raimondo Ponte
- Stadium: Letzigrund
- Nationalliga A Qualification round: 9th of 12
- Promotion/relegation group NLA/NLB: 3rd of 8
- 1994–95 Swiss Cup: Round 5
- Top goalscorer: League: Peter Møller (9); All: Peter Møller (12)

The 1994–95 season was FC Zürich's 98th season in their existence, since their foundation in 1896. It was their fifth consecutive season in the top flight of Swiss football, following their promotion at the end of 1989–90 season.

== Overview ==
The local businessman Sven Hotz was the club's chairman and patron at this time. He had taken over as club president at the AGM in 1986. Englishman Bob Houghton had been appointed as first team head-coach in April during the previous season and he continued in this function for this season. The FCZ first team competed in this years domestic first-tier 1994–95 Nationalliga A with the clear intention of retaining their top level status. The team also competed in 1994–95 Swiss Cup. They had not qualified for any of the UEFA European tournaments and they did not enter the 1994 Intertoto Cup. FCZ played their home games in the Letzigrund. the stadium is located in the west of Zurich in the district of Altstetten, which is about three kilometers from the city center.

The qualification of the NLA began on 27 July 1994 and was completed on 4 December. The top eight teams in the qualification phase would advance to the championship group and the last four teams would play against relegation. At the end of the qualification phase, FCZ slipped into the relegation zone With the defeat on the final matchday against Luzern their opponents secured themselves a slot in the championship group and left FCZ below the split, to play against relegation. Hotz held on to his head-coach, but after the third match day in the relegation group the moods changed and Bob Houghton lost his job. He was replaced by Raimondo Ponte who at that time was head-coach by the FCZ farm-team FC Baden.

== Players ==
The following is the list of the FCZ first team squad this season. It also includes players that were in the squad the day the domestic league season started, on 27 July 1994, but subsequently left the club after that date.

Note: Flags indicate national team as defined under FIFA eligibility rules; some limited exceptions apply. Players may hold more than one non-FIFA nationality.

No.	Pos.	Nation	Player
—	GK	SUI	Patrick Abatangelo (league games: 3)
—	GK	SUI	Jörg Stiel (league games: 33)
—	DF	SUI	Pascal Castillo (league games: 4)
—	DF	SUI	Mark Disler (league games: 12)
—	DF	SUI	Marc Hodel (league games: 33)
—	DF	SUI	Urs Isler (league games: 16)
—	DF	SUI	Giuseppe Mazzarelli (league games: 25)
—	DF	SUI	Kazik Nicolò (league games: 4)
—	DF	SUI	Martin Ninghetto (league games: 1)
—	DF	SUI	Fabio Patera (league games: 1)
—	DF	SUI	Aniello Tomeo (league games: 2)
—	DF	SUI	Roland Widmer (league games: 29)
—	MF	SUI	Alijosa Aleksandrovic (league games: 1)
—	MF	ITA	Roberto Baldassarri (league games: 13)

No.	Pos.	Nation	Player
—	MF	ITA	Mario Casamento (league games: 17)
—	MF	SUI	Francesco Di Jorio (on loan to Lausanne-Sport)
—	MF	SUI	Gérard Favre (league games: 15)
—	MF	SUI	Ralph Heydecker (league games: 34)
—	MF	SUI	Mario Kägi (league games: 24)
—	MF	SUI	Andreas Schmid (league games: 2)
—	MF	SUI	Jürg Studer (league games: 23)
—	MF	SUI	Daniel Tarone (league games: 31)
—	FW	DEN	Peter Møller (league games: 26)
—	FW	TUR	Ercüment Şahin (league games: 33)
—	FW	YUG	Haris Škoro (league games: 26)
—	FW	ENG	Roger Walker (league games: 20)
—	FW	GER	Herbert Waas (league games: 17)
—	FW	ITA	Claudio Zambotti (league games: 4)

Players who left the squad

The following is the list of the FCZ first team players that left the squad during the previous season or in the off-season, before the new domestic season began.

Note: Flags indicate national team as defined under FIFA eligibility rules; some limited exceptions apply. Players may hold more than one non-FIFA nationality.

No.	Pos.	Nation	Player
—	GK	SUI	Roberto Böckli (to Grasshopper Club)
—	GK	SUI	Patrick Mäder (to Winterthur)
—	DF	YUG	Mirsad Baljić (to Luzern)
—	DF	SUI	Marcel Hotz (to FC Dübendorf)
—	DF	SUI	Umberto Romano (to Baden)
—	DF	SUI	Beat Studer (retired)

No.	Pos.	Nation	Player
—	MF	NED	Pierre Blättler (to Baden)
—	MF	GER	Rainer Ernst (to FSV Salmrohr)
—	MF	TUN	Mohamed Ali Mahjoubi (to Espérance Sportive de Tunis)
—	MF	SUI	Georgios Tzionas (reserves)
—	FW	SUI	Marco Grassi (to Servette)

== Results ==
Legend

Win Draw Loss Postponed

=== Nationalliga A ===
==== Qualification phase ====
27 July 1994 Round 1	Zürich	1–1	Lausanne-Sport	Letzigrund, Zürich
20:00	Şahin (yellow card) 5'; Heydecker (yellow card) 62'; J. Studer 64' (1:1); Isler (yellow card) 78'	FCZ summary	(yellow card) 17' Pister; 38' (0:1) Käslin; (yellow card) 50' Viret; (yellow card) 27' La Placa; (yellow card) 62' Sylvestre	Attendance: 4,600; Referee: (Switzerland) Michel Zen-Ruffinen

3 August 1994 Round 2	Aarau	3–0	Zürich	Stadion Brügglifeld, Aarau
20:00	Pavličević 68' (1:0); Kucharski 82' (2:0); Fink 83' (3:0)	FCZ summary FCA summary	(yellow card) 31' Hodel; (yellow card) 75' Škoro	Attendance: 5,800; Referee: (Switzerland) Daniel Roduit (Sion)

6 August 1994 Round 3	Zürich	0–0	Basel	Letzigrund, Zürich
20:00	J. Studer (yellow card) 36'	FCZ summary FCB summaey	(yellow card) 66' Rey	Attendance: 12,000; Referee: (Switzerland) Kurt Röthlisberger
Note: League debut for Thierry Schmitt

14 August 1994 Round 4	Grasshopper Club	2–1	Zürich	Hardturm, Zürich
20:00	Lombardo (yellow card) 25'; Subiat 40' (1:0); Koller 48' (2:0); Vega (yellow card) 73'	FCZ summary	(yellow card) 53' Mazzarelli; 65' (2:1) Kägi; (yellow card) 78' Škoro	Attendance: 10,200; Referee: (Switzerland) Urs Meier (Würenlos)

20 August 1994 Round 5	St. Gallen	1–1	Zürich	Espenmoos, St. Gallen
17:30	(Mazzarelli) 74' (o.g.); Fischer (yellow card) 86'	FCZ summary	(yellow card) 44' Tarone; 67' (0:1) Mazzarelli; (yellow card) 80' Škoro	Attendance: 6,800; Referee: (Switzerland) Kurt Zuppinger (Bremgarten)

27 August 1994 Round 6	Zürich	1–1	Lugano	Letzigrund, Zürich
20:00	Tarone 43' (1:0)	FCZ summary	(yellow card) 45' Esposito; 46' (1:1) Galvão	Attendance: 3,600; Referee: (Switzerland) Serge Muhmenthaler (Grenchen)

31 August 1994 Round 7	Xamax	0–1	Zürich	Stade de la Maladière, Neuchâtel
20:00		FCZ summary	68' (0:1) Møller	Attendance: 9,500; Referee: (Switzerland) Hans Müller (Bern)

3 September 1994 Round 8	Young Boys	4–0	Zürich	Wankdorf Stadium, Bern
20:00	Neqrouz 31' (1:0); Giallanza (yellow card) 47'; Giallanza 62' (pen.); Hartmann 79' (3:0); Giallanza 84' (4:0); Aduobe (yellow card) 89'	FCZ summary	(yellow card) 75' Heydecker	Attendance: 4,900; Referee: (Switzerland) Werner Müller (Obererlinsbach)

10 September 1994 Round 9	Zürich	1–1	Servette	Letzigrund, Zürich
20:00	J. Studer 45' (1:0); Heydecker (yellow card) 61'	FCZ summary	82' (1:1) Renato; (yellow card) 90' Schepull	Attendance: 3,700; Referee: (Switzerland) Cornu

17 September 1994 Round 10	Sion	2–1	Zürich	Stade Tourbillon, Sion
20:00	Widmer 4' (o.g.); Orlando (yellow card) 25'; Herr 71' (2:1)	FCZ summary	8' (1:1) Favre; (yellow card) 69' Widmer; (yellow card) 75' Isler; (yellow card) 88' J. Studer	Attendance: 7,000; Referee: (Switzerland) Dieter Schoch (Attiswil)

21 September 1994 Round 11	Zürich	2–2	Luzern	Letzigrund, Zürich
20:00	Tarone (yellow card) 27'; Widmer (yellow card) 35'; Heydecker 72' (pen.); Heydecker 90+2' (2:2)	FCZ summary	17' (0:1) Güntensperger; 21' (0:2) Bertelsen; (yellow card) 27' Renggli; (yellow card) 33' Wyss	Attendance: 3,600; Referee: (Switzerland) Andreas Schluchter (Schönenbuch)

1 October 1994 Round 12	Lausanne-Sport	0–0	Zürich	Olympique de la Pontaise, Lausanne
20:00	Badea (yellow card) 1'	FCZ summary	(yellow card) 4' Isler; (yellow card) 68' Hodel; (yellow card) 71' Widmer; (yellow card) 75' Disler	Attendance: 4,000; Referee: (Switzerland) Kurt Zuppinger (Bremgarten)

5 October 1994 Round 13	Zürich	4–0	Aarau	Letzigrund, Zürich
20:00	Tarone 42' (1:0); Møller 55' (2:0); Škoro (yellow card) 63' (yellow-red card) 68'; Favre 81' (3:0); Waas 84' (4:0)	FCZ summary FCA summary		Attendance: 3,800; Referee: (Switzerland) Daniel Roduit (Sion)

15 October 1994 Round 14	Basel	0–0	Zürich	St. Jakob-Park, Basel
20:00	Cantaluppi (yellow card) 34'; Meier (yellow card) 61'	FCZ summary FCB report	(yellow card) 28' Hodel; (yellow card) 46' Kägi; (yellow card) 88' Favre	Attendance: 25,000; Referee: (Switzerland) Michel Zen-Ruffinen

23 October 1994 Round 15	Zürich	0–3	Grasshopper Club	Letzigrund, Zürich
14:30	(yellow card) 90+2' Stiel; (yellow card) 90+2' Favre	FCZ summary	13' (0:1) Willems; 27' (0:2) Willems; 90+2' M. Yakin	Attendance: 10,000; Referee: (Switzerland) Werner Müller (Obererlinsbach)

26 October 1994 Round 16	Zürich	1–1	St. Gallen	Letzigrund, Zürich
20:00	Favre 1' (1:0); Hodel (yellow card) 32'	FCZ summary	15' (1:1) Frick; (yellow card) 37' Tejeda	Attendance: 2,600; Referee: (Switzerland) Serge Muhmenthaler (Grenchen)

30 October 1994 Round 17	Lugano	2–2	Zürich	Cornaredo, Lugano
14:30	Galvão 26' (1:1); Fernandez (yellow card) 42'; Englund 89' (2:2)	FCZ summary	7' (0:1) Şahin; (yellow card) 18' Hodel; 77' (1:2) Møller; (yellow card) 90' Stiel	Attendance: 4,200; Referee: (Switzerland) Andreas Schluchter (Schönenbuch)

6 November 1994 Round 18	Zürich	2–0	Xamax	Letzigrund, Zürich
14:30	Škoro 9' (1:0); Kägi (yellow card) 54'; Møller 72' (2:0)	FCZ summary	(yellow card) 30' Gottardi	Attendance: 2,500; Referee: (Switzerland) Urs Meier (Wettingen and Würenlos)

9 November 1994 Round 19	Zürich	0–0	Young Boys	Letzigrund, Zürich
20:00	Škoro (yellow card) 47' (yellow-red card) 80'	FCZ summary	(yellow card) 32' Baumann; (yellow card) 77' Ippoliti; (yellow card) 85' Sutter	Attendance: 3,300; Referee: (Switzerland) Michel Zen-Ruffinen

20 November 1994 Round 20	Servette	2–0	Zürich	Charmilles Stadium, Geneva
14:30	Neuville 2' (1:0); Neuville 39' (2:0); Renato (yellow card) 77'	FCZ summary	(red card) 77' Mazzarelli	Attendance: 4,500; Referee: (Switzerland) Kurt Röthlisberger (Suhr, Aargau)

27 November 1994 Round 21	Zürich	4–0	Sion	Letzigrund, Zürich
14:30	Heydecker 10' (pen.); Škoro 42' (2:0); Waas 45' (3:0); Şahin 58' (4:0)	FCZ summary		Attendance: 4,000; Referee: (Switzerland) Serge Muhmenthaler (Grenchen)

4 December 1994 Round 22	Luzern	2–1	Zürich	Stadion Allmend, Luzern
14:30	Güntensperger 45' (1:1); Gmür 72' (2:1); Güntensperger (yellow card) 88'	FCZ summary	39' (0:1) Şahin; (yellow card) 39' Şahin; (yellow card) 43' Mazzarelli; (yellow card) 65' Tarone	Attendance: 8,700; Referee: (Switzerland) Kurt Röthlisberger (Suhr, Aargau)

==== Qualification table ====
Pos	Team	Pld	W	D	L	GF	GA	GD	Pts	Qualification
1	Grasshopper Club	22	13	5	4	36	21	+15	31	Advance to championship round halved points (rounded up) as bonus
2	Lugano	22	8	9	5	30	17	+13	25	Advance to championship round halved points (rounded up) as bonus
3	Aarau	22	8	9	5	34	22	+12	25	Advance to championship round halved points (rounded up) as bonus
4	Xamax	22	9	6	7	33	31	+2	24	Advance to championship round halved points (rounded up) as bonus
5	Lausanne-Sport	22	8	8	6	34	35	−1	24	Advance to championship round halved points (rounded up) as bonus
6	Sion	22	10	3	9	32	37	−5	23	Advance to championship round halved points (rounded up) as bonus
7	Basel	22	6	8	8	18	15	+3	20	Advance to championship round halved points (rounded up) as bonus
8	Luzern	22	7	6	9	22	31	−9	20	Advance to championship round halved points (rounded up) as bonus
9	Zürich	22	4	11	7	23	27	−4	19	Continue to promotion/relegation round
10	Servette	22	6	6	10	26	31	−5	18	Continue to promotion/relegation round
11	St. Gallen	22	4	10	8	20	28	−8	18	Continue to promotion/relegation round
12	Young Boys	22	6	5	11	24	37	−13	17	Continue to promotion/relegation round

Source: rsssf.com
Rules for classification: 1) Points; 2) Goal difference; 3) Goals scored; 4) Head-to-head points; 5) Away goals scored; 6) Draw.

==== Promotion/relegation group NLA/NLB ====
The teams in the ninth to twelfth positions in Nationalliga A competed with the top four teams of Nationalliga B in a Nationalliga A/B promotion/relegation round. The stage began on 26 February and was completed on 13 June 1995.

26 February 1995 Round 1	Kriens	P–P	Zürich	Stadion Kleinfeld, Kriens
14:30		[ FCZ summary]		Referee: (Switzerland) Urs Meier (Wettingen and Würenlos)

5 March 1995 Round 2	Zürich	2–1	Yverdon-Sports	Letzigrund, Zürich
14:30	Møller 17' (1:0); Walker (yellow card) 23'; Tarone 35' (2:1)	FCZ summary	22' (pen. 1:1) Luciano; (yellow card) 32' Fasel; (yellow card) 63' Sutter	Attendance: 2,500; Referee: (Switzerland) Werner Müller (Obererlinsbach)

12 March 1995 Round 3	FC Solothurn	2–2	Zürich	Stadion FC Solothurn, Solothurn
14:30	Du Buisson 35' (1:2); Du Buisson 80' (2:2)	FCZ summary	1' (0:1) Møller; 14' (0:2) Møller; (yellow card) 33' Walker	Attendance: 2,850; Referee: (Switzerland) Karl Strässle (Steinach)
Note: Møller's first goal after 32 seconds

16 March 1995 Round 1	Kriens	1–1	Zürich	Stadion Kleinfeld, Kriens
19:00	Ahinful 33' (1:0)	FCZ summary	(yellow card) 45' Kägi; 75' (1:1) Walker	Attendance: 1,000; Referee: (Switzerland) Urs Meier (Wettingen and Würenlos)
Note: Rescheduled following postponement on 26 February

1 April 1995 Round 4	Zürich	0–1	Servette	Letzigrund, Zürich
17:30	Møller (yellow card) 54'; Škoro (yellow card) 70'	FCZ summary	(yellow card) 31' Moro; 48' (0:1) Sinval; (yellow card) 85' Mild	Attendance: 2,100; Referee: (Switzerland) Serge Muhmenthaler (Grenchen)

8 April 1995 Round 5	Winterthur	0–1	Zürich	Schützenwiese, Winterthur
20:00		FCZ summary	(yellow card) 34' Widmer; 54' (0:1) Škoro	Attendance: 3,800; Referee: (Switzerland) Hans Müller (Bern)

12 April 1995 Round 6	Zürich	2–1	St. Gallen	Letzigrund, Zürich
20:00	Mazzarelli 18' (1:0); Walker (yellow card) 29'; Škoro 51' (2:0); Škoro (yellow card) 82'	FCZ summary	53' (2:1) Gilewicz; (yellow card) 77' Gambino	Attendance: 3,400; Referee: (Switzerland) Andreas Schluchter (Schönenbuch)

29 April 1995 Round 7	Young Boys	2–2	Zürich	Wankdorf Stadium, Bern
20:00	Christensen 14' (1:1); Aduobe 52' (2:1); Neqrouz (yellow card) 67'; Baumann (yellow card) 74'	FCZ summary	12' (0:1) Kägi; (yellow card) 61' Mazzarelli; 77' (2:2) Şahin	Attendance: 5,000; Referee: (Switzerland) Urs Meier (Wettingen and Würenlos)

6 May 1995 Round 8	Zürich	1–0	Young Boys	Letzigrund, Zürich
17:30	Møller 33' (1:0); Tarone (yellow card) 85'	FCZ summary	(yellow card) 44' Aduobe	Attendance: 2,800; Referee: (Switzerland) Andreas Schluchter (Schönenbuch)

14 May 1995 Round 9	St. Gallen	1–1	Zürich	Espenmoos, St. Gallen
17:30	Gertschen 28' (1:1); Fischer (yellow card) 36'; Koch (yellow card) 73'	FCZ summary	20' (0:1) Şahin; (red card) 33' Møller; (yellow card) 67' Kägi	Attendance: 4,000; Referee: (Switzerland) Werner Müller (Obererlinsbach)

20 May 1995 Round 10	Zürich	0–0	Winterthur	Letzigrund, Zürich
17:30	Tarone (yellow card) 71'	FCZ summary	(yellow card) 8' Simunek; (yellow card) 11' Torghele; (yellow card) 54' Maiano; (yellow card) 57' Ibrahim	Attendance: 2,600; Referee: (Switzerland) Karl Strässle (Steinach)

28 May 1995 Round 11	Servette	0–0	Zürich	Charmilles Stadium, Geneva
20:00	Margarini (yellow card) 27'; Mild (yellow card) 78'	FCZ summary	(yellow card) 76' Şahin	Attendance: 3,900; Referee: (Switzerland) Andreas Schluchter (Schönenbuch)

31 May 1995 Round 12	Zürich	5–0	FC Solothurn	Letzigrund, Zürich
20:00	Şahin 17' (1:0); Tarone 43' (2:0); Şahin 42' (3:0); Mazzarelli 56' (4:0); Mazzarelli 69' (5:0)	FCZ summary		Attendance: 1,652; Referee: (Switzerland) Dominique Tavel (Lonay)

6 June 1995 Round 13	Yverdon-Sports	2–1	Zürich	Stade Municipal, Yverdon
20:00	Yenay 4' (1:0); Yenay (yellow card) 35'; Yenay 78' (2:1); Fasel (yellow card) 81'; Langel (yellow card) 86'; Castro (yellow card) 89'	FCZ summary	18' (1:1) Schmid	Attendance: 1,100; Referee: (Liechtenstein) Roland Beck (Triesenberg)

13 June 1995 Round 14	Zürich	1–5	Kriens	Letzigrund, Zürich
20:00	Møller 87' (1:4)	FCZ summary	14' (0:1) Ahinful; 19' (0:2) Ahinful; 23' (0:3) Zwyssig; 67' (0:4) Ndlovu; 89' (1:5) Zwyssig	Attendance: 1,000; Referee: (Switzerland) Serge Muhmenthaler (Grenchen)

==== Final table ====
Pos	Team	Pld	W	D	L	GF	GA	GD	Pts	Qualification
1	BSC Young Boys	14	7	3	4	22	14	+8	17	Remain in 1995–96 Nationalliga A
2	FC St. Gallen	14	5	6	3	20	13	+7	16	Remain in 1995–96 Nationalliga A
3	FC Zürich	14	5	6	3	19	16	+3	16	Remain in 1995–96 Nationalliga A
4	Servette FC	14	5	6	3	15	13	+2	16	Remain in 1995–96 Nationalliga A
5	SC Kriens	14	4	7	3	18	14	+4	15	Remain in 1995–96 Nationalliga B
6	Yverdon-Sport FC	14	6	3	5	18	15	+3	15	Remain in 1995–96 Nationalliga B
7	FC Winterthur	14	3	7	4	13	13	0	13	Remain in 1995–96 Nationalliga B
8	FC Solothurn	14	0	4	10	4	31	−27	4	Remain in 1995–96 Nationalliga B

Source: rsssf.com
Rules for classification: 1) Points; 2) Goal difference; 3) Goals scored; 4) Head-to-head points; 5) Away goals scored; 6) Draw.

=== Swiss Cup ===
The first-tier teams from the 1994–95 Nationalliga A were granted byes for the first two rounds, eight of them joined the competition in this round. The four that were engaged im the European competitions were granted byes for this round as well. The eight participating teams were seeded and cound not be drawn against each other. The draw respected regionalities, when possible, and the lower classed team was granted home advantage.

25 September 1994 Round 3	Winterthur	1–2	Zürich	Schützenwiese, Winterthur
	Ferro (yellow card) 13'; Gaspoz (yellow card) 17'; Saykouk 63' (1:1); Ibrahim (yellow card) 89'	FCZ summary	47' (0:1) Møller; (yellow card) 56' J. Studer; (yellow card) 63' Tarone; 90' (1:2) Møller	Attendance: 3,700; Referee: (Switzerland) Marcel Vollenweider (Rüti, Zürich)

19 March 1995 Round 4	FC Chiasso	0–2	Zürich	Stadio Comunale Riva IV, Chiasso
	Lorenzi (yellow card) 8'	FCZ summary	(yellow card) 9' Mazzarelli; 39' (0:1) Møller; 63' (0:2) Škoro; (yellow card) 73' Walker	Attendance: 1,000; Referee: (Liechtenstein) Roland Beck (Triesenberg)

17 April 1995 Round 5	FC Wil	1–0	Zürich	Stadion Bergholz, Wil
	Buhl 36' (1:0); Besio (yellow card) 58'; Schürmann (yellow card) 76'; Baur (yellow card) 80'	FCZ summary	(yellow card) 54' Şahin; (yellow card) 80' Tarone	Attendance: 2,800; Referee: (Switzerland) Vincent Dafflon

=== Friendly matches ===
==== Pre-season ====
7 July 1994 Exhibition game	Zürich	2–1	Baden	Sportplatz Moos, Affoltern am Albis
	Waas 63' (1:0); Škoro 69' (2:0)	FCZ summary		Referee: (Switzerland) Urs Meier (Wettingen and Würenlos)

12 July 1994 Semi-final Sepione Cup	Basel	0–0 (4–3 p)	Zürich	Sportplatz Moos, Balsthal
19:30	Tabakovic (yellow card) 90'	FCZ summary FCB summary		Attendance: 1,600; Referee: (Switzerland) Serge Muhmenthaler (Grenchen)
	Penalties
	Hertig (penalty scored); Rey (penalty scored); Meier (penalty scored); Walker (penalty missed); Cantaluppi (penalty scored)		(penalty missed) Škoro; (penalty missed) Şahin; (penalty scored) Heydecker; (penalty scored) Casamento; (penalty scored) Mazzarelli
Note: The Sempione Cup was a club tournament played in the summer at Sportanlage Moos in Balsthal, during the years 1987 to 2004.

16 July 1994 Sepione Cup	Zürich	1–0	St. Gallen	Sportplatz Moos, Balsthal
	Waas 4' (1:0)	FCZ summary		Attendance: 700; Referee: (Switzerland) Schuppisser
Note: Sepione Cup match for third place

21 July 1994 Uhrencup semi-final	Zürich	2–0	Schaffhausen	Stadion Brühl, Grenchen
	Mazzarelli 63' (1:0); Škoro 70' (2:0)	FCZ summary	(yellow card) 5' Bossi	Attendance: 450; Referee: (Switzerland) Reto Tollot
Note: The Uhrencup is a former club football tournament that was held annually in Grenchen in Switzerland.

23 July 1994 Uhrencup final	Zürich	2–1	SR Delémont	Stadion Brühl, Grenchen
	Heydecker 9' (pen.); Škoro 33' (2:0)	FCZ summary	52' (2:1) Vukic; (red card) 76' Froidevaux	Attendance: 800; Referee: (Switzerland) Werner Müller (Obererlinsbach)
Note: Prize money CHF 10 000

==== Winter break ====
17 January 1995 Exhibition game	Coco Expo	0–8	Zürich	West Palm Beach, Florida
		FCZ summary	Škoro; Škoro; Møller; Møller; Şahin; Şahin; Castillo; Castillo
Note: Coco Expo was a soccer team from Palm Beach County, Florida

24 January 1995 Exhibition game	Eintracht Frankfurt	6–0	Zürich	West Palm Beach, Florida
	Furtok; Furtok; Doll; Doll; Wolf; Penksa	FCZ summary

2 February 1994 Exhibition game	Bellinzona	1–1	Zürich	Stadio Comunale, Bellinzona
	Bützer 88' (1:1)	FCZ summary	21' (0:1) Mazzarelli	Attendance: 200

16 February 1995 Exhibition game	Zürich	3–3	Grasshopper Club	Letzigrund, Zürich
	Walker 25' (1:1); Škoro 53' (2:3); Şahin 82' (3:3)	FCZ summary	22' (0:1) Lombardo; 27' (1:2) M. Yakin; 31' (1:3) Subiat	Attendance: 500; Referee: (Switzerland) Urs Meier (Wettingen and Würenlos)

17 February 1995 Exhibition game	Schaffhausen	2–2	Zürich	Stadion Breite, Schaffhausen
	Pagno 45' (1:1); Gerstenmájer 87' (2:2)	[ FCZ summary]	28' (0:1) Mazzarelli; 84' (1:2) J. Studer	Attendance: 400; Referee: (Switzerland) Urs Meier (Wettingen and Würenlos)

== Sources ==
- dbFCZ Homepage
- Switzerland 1994–95 at RSSSF

Preceded by 1993–94	FC Zürich seasons	Succeeded by 1995–96
