= 1995–96 FC Zürich season =

FC Zürich
1995–96 season
- Owner: Sven Hotz
- Chairman: Sven Hotz
- Head-coach: Raimondo Ponte
- Stadium: Letzigrund
- Nationalliga A Qualification round: 11th of 12
- Promotion/relegation group NLA/NLB: 2nd of 8
- 1995–96 Swiss Cup: Round 5

The 1995–96 season was FC Zürich's 99th season in their existence, since their foundation in 1896. It was their sixth consecutive season in the top flight of Swiss football, following their promotion at the end of 1989–90 season.

== Overview ==
The local businessman Sven Hotz was the club's chairman and patron at this time. He had taken over as club president at the AGM in 1986. Raimondo Ponte had been appointed as first team head-coach in March, during the previous season, and he continued in this function for this season. The FCZ first team competed in this years domestic first-tier 1995–96 Nationalliga A with the clear intention of retaining their top level status. This was the first season that three points were awarded to the winning team of each match, previously this had been two. The team also competed in 1995–96 Swiss Cup. They had not qualified for any of the UEFA European tournaments and they did not enter the 1995 Intertoto Cup.

FCZ played their home games in the Letzigrund. The stadium is located in the west of Zurich in the district of Altstetten, which is about three kilometers from the city center.

== Players ==
The following is the list of the FCZ first team squad this season. It also includes players that were in the squad the day the domestic league season started, on 19 July 1995, but subsequently left the club after that date.

Note: Flags indicate national team as defined under FIFA eligibility rules; some limited exceptions apply. Players may hold more than one non-FIFA nationality.

No.	Pos.	Nation	Player
—	GK	SUI	Patrick Abatangelo (on loan to FC Bülach)
—	GK	SUI	Jörg Stiel (league games: 36)
—	DF	SUI	Pascal Castillo (league games: 29)
—	DF	SUI	Mark Disler (league games: 10)
—	DF	SUI	Urs Fischer (league games: 33)
—	DF	SUI	Giuseppe Gambino (league games: 32)
—	DF	SUI	Marc Hodel (league games: 20)
—	DF	SUI	Robert Huber (league games: 27)
—	DF	SUI	Giuseppe Mazzarelli (league games: 22)
—	DF	SUI	Kazik Nicolò (league games: 3)
—	DF	SUI	Aniello Tomeo (league games: 1)
—	DF	SUI	Carmelo Trande (league games: 5)
—	DF	SUI	Roland Widmer (league games: 8)
—	MF	SUI	Alijosa Aleksandrovic (league games: 1)
—	MF	ITA	Roberto Baldassarri (league games: 23)

No.	Pos.	Nation	Player
—	MF	SUI	Francesco Di Jorio (league games: 21)
—	MF	SUI	Philipp Lehner (league games: 1)
—	MF	RSA	August Makalakalane (league games: 31)
—	MF	ITA	Giuseppe Nocita (league games: 2)
—	MF	SUI	Andreas Schmid (league games: 1)
—	MF	SUI	Jürg Studer (league games: 31)
—	MF	SUI	Daniel Tarone (league games: 33)
—	MF	SUI	Rony Ziegler (league games: 6)
—	FW	NOR	Jørn Andersen (league games: 28)
—	FW	SUI	Urs Güntensperger (league games: 33)
—	FW	NED	John Hoeks (league games: 5)
—	FW	SUI	Sinisa Metlar (league games: 1)
—	FW	TRI	Jerren Nixon (league games: 29)
—	FW	COD	Shabani Nonda (league games: 10)
—	FW	ENG	Roger Walker (league games: 10)

Players who left the squad

The following is the list of the FCZ first team players that left the squad during the previous season or in the off-season, before the new domestic season began.

Note: Flags indicate national team as defined under FIFA eligibility rules; some limited exceptions apply. Players may hold more than one non-FIFA nationality.

No.	Pos.	Nation	Player
—	DF	SUI	Urs Isler (to FC Frauenfeld)
—	DF	SUI	Martin Ninghetto (reserves)
—	DF	SUI	Fabio Patera (to SC Young Fellows Juventus)
—	MF	ITA	Mario Casamento (to Baden)
—	MF	SUI	Gérard Favre (to FC Bulle)
—	MF	SUI	Ralph Heydecker (to Schaffhausen)

No.	Pos.	Nation	Player
—	MF	SUI	Mario Kägi (to Xamax)
—	FW	DEN	Peter Møller (to Brøndby IF)
—	FW	TUR	Ercüment Şahin (to Bursaspor)
—	FW	YUG	Haris Škoro (to Baden)
—	FW	GER	Herbert Waas (to Dynamo Dresden)
—	FW	ITA	Claudio Zambotti (to Schaffhausen)

== Results ==
Legend

Win Draw Loss Postponed

=== Nationalliga A ===
This was the first season that three points were awarded to the winning team of each match, previously this had been two.

==== Qualification phase ====
The first stage of the NLA began on 22 July 1995 and was completed on 3 December. The top eight teams in the qualification phase would advance to the championship group and the last four teams would play against relegation.

19 July 1995 Round 1	Aarau	2–0	Zürich	Stadion Brügglifeld, Aarau
19:30	Wiederkehr 6' (1:0); Saibene (yellow card) 40'; Brugnoli (yellow card) 55'; Wiederkehr 56' (2:0); Markovic (yellow card) 78'	FCZ summary FCA summary	(yellow card) 18' Tarone; (yellow card) 30' Fischer; (yellow card) 82' Hoeks	Attendance: 5,600; Referee: (Switzerland) Andreas Schluchter (Schönenbuch)

22 July 1995 Round 2	Zürich	0–4	St. Gallen	Letzigrund, Zürich
16:00	J. Studer (yellow card) 5'; Gambino (yellow card) 22' (yellow-red card) 34'; Hodel (yellow card) 28'	FCZ summary	23' (0:1) Tejeda; (yellow card) 30' Tejeda; 45' (0:2) Milton; 72' (0:3) Frick; 78' (0:4) Zellweger	Attendance: 5,200; Referee: (Switzerland) Kurt Zuppinger (Bremgarten)
Note: Mazzarelli's 87th-minute goal was disallowed due to an offside.

29 July 1995 Round 3	Luzern	1–0	Zürich	Stadion Allmend, Luzern
20:00	Aleksandrov 10' (1:0); Aleksandrov (yellow card) 89'	FCZ summary	(yellow card) 20' Widmer; (yellow card) 53' Güntensperger; (yellow card) 59' Disler; (yellow card) 89' Tarone	Attendance: 9,000; Referee: (Switzerland) Serge Muhmenthaler (Grenchen)

2 August 1995 Round 4	Zürich	1–4	Grasshopper Club	Letzigrund, Zürich
20:00	Disler (yellow card) 29'; Mazzarelli (yellow card) 47'; Güntensperger 61' (1:3); Fischer (yellow card) 79'	FCZ summary	30' (0:1) Viscaal; 44' (0:2) Ali Ibrahim; 51' (0:3) Comisetti; 76' (1:4) Viscaal; (penalty missed) 90+1′ Vogel	Attendance: 10,000; Referee: (Switzerland) Serge Muhmenthaler (Grenchen)

5 August 1995 Round 5	Zürich	0–0	Basel	Letzigrund, Zürich
16:00	Gambino (yellow card) 5'; Hoeks (yellow card) 52'	FCZ summary FCB summary		Attendance: 13,500; Referee: (Switzerland) Hans Müller (Bern)
Note: According to NZZ, mainly FCB fans at the Letzigrund. According to Baz, around 9,000 FCB supporters in the stadium. Corners: 4:4. Good referee.

19 August 1995 Round 6	Lausanne-Sport	3–0	Zürich	Olympique de la Pontaise, Lausanne
19:30	Küffer (yellow card) 27'; Biaggi 31' (1:0); Biaggi 35' (2:0); Dembiński 79' (3:0); Comisetti (yellow card) 82'	FCZ summary	(yellow card) 4' Güntensperger; (yellow card) 37' Hodel; (yellow card) 67' Castillo	Attendance: 4,800; Referee: (Switzerland) Claude Détruche (Thônex)

26 August 1995 Round 7	Zürich	1–3	Xamax	Letzigrund, Zürich
16:00	Güntensperger (yellow card) 18'; Baldassari 88' (1:3)	FCZ summary	52' (0:1) Wittl; 66' (0:2) Moldovan; 72' (0:3) Bonalair	Attendance: 2,600; Referee: (Switzerland) Kurt Zuppinger (Bremgarten)

30 August 1995 Round 8	Zürich	2–1	Servette	Letzigrund, Zürich
20:00	Di Jorio 23' (1:0); Fischer (yellow card) 73'; Gambino 81' (2:1)	FCZ summary	37' (1:1) Sesa; (yellow card) 49' Němeček	Attendance: 3,100; Referee: (Switzerland) Hans Müller (Bern)

9 September 1995 Round 9	Sion	2–2	Zürich	Stade Tourbillon, Sion
20:00	Giallanza 10' (1:0); Vercruysse 62' (2:2); Vercruysse (yellow card) 64'	FCZ summary	43' (1:1) Güntensperger; (yellow card) 51' Gambino; (yellow card) 53' Di Jorio; 55' (1:2) Güntensperger; (yellow card) 82' Widmer; (yellow card) 90+2' Hodel	Attendance: 8,500; Referee: (Switzerland) Dominique Tavel (Lonay)

16 September 1995 Round 10	Lugano	1–1	Zürich	Cornaredo, Lugano
20:30	Penzavalli (yellow card) 57'; Manfreda 65' (1:0)	FCZ summary	(yellow card) 70' Baldassari; 81' (1:1) Andersen	Attendance: 3,000; Referee: (Switzerland) Werner Müller (Obererlinsbach)

20 September 1995 Round 11	Zürich	0–0	Young Boys	Letzigrund, Zürich
20:00	Widmer (yellow card) 30'; Güntensperger (yellow card) 73'	FCZ summary	(red card) 20' Streun; (yellow card) 44' Baumann; (yellow card) 52' Christensen; (yellow card) 82' Eich	Attendance: 2,800; Referee: (Switzerland) Karl Strässle (Steinach)

30 September 1995 Round 12	Zürich	1–1	Aarau	Letzigrund, Zürich
16:00	Güntensperger (yellow card) 40'; Nixon 64' (1:1); Di Jorio (yellow card) 85'	FCZ summary	(yellow card) 34' Senn; 53' (0:1) Allenspach; (yellow card) 74' Saibene	Attendance: 3,500; Referee: (Switzerland) Freddy Philippoz (Sion)

4 October 1995 Round 13	St. Gallen	1–0	Zürich	Espenmoos, St. Gallen
20:00	Brunner 5' (1:0); Tejeda (yellow card) 6'; Pédat (yellow card) 36'; Fonseca (yellow card) 45'	FCZ summary	(yellow card) 65' Fischer; (yellow card) 85' Castillo	Attendance: 7,500; Referee: (Switzerland) Claude Détruche (Thônex)

14 October 1995 Round 14	Zürich	0–1	Luzern	Letzigrund, Zürich
16:00		FCZ summary	(yellow card) 54' Gmür; 85' (0:1) Wolf	Attendance: 4.500; Referee: (Liechtenstein) Roland Beck (Triesenberg)

21 October 1995 Round 15	Grasshopper Club	2–0	Zürich	Hardturm, Zürich
14:30	Geiger 18' (1:0); Ali Ibrahim 84' (2:0)	FCZ summary	(yellow card) 32' Andersen; (yellow card) 51' Walker	Attendance: 7,550; Referee: (Switzerland) Urs Meier (Wettingen and Würenlos)

28 October 1995 Round 16	Basel	0–3	Zürich	St. Jakob Stadium, Basel
20:00	Smajić (yellow card) 88'	FCZ summary FCB summary	10' Güntensperger; 44' Gambino; (yellow card) 85' Makalakalane; 90' Castillo	Attendance: 13,500; Referee: (Switzerland) Werner Müller (Obererlinsbach)
Note: FCB's first match after sacking head-coach Claude Andrey with Oldřich Šváb as interims coach on the side-line.

5 November 1995 Round 17	Zürich	3–1	Lausanne-Sport	Letzigrund, Zürich
16:00	Makalakalane 5' (1:0); Güntensperger 50' (2:0); Nixon 54' (3:0)	FCZ summary	63' (3:1) Biaggi	Attendance: 3,200; Referee: (Switzerland) Hans Müller (Bern)

12 November 1995 Round 18	Xamax	0–2	Zürich	Stade de la Maladière, Neuchâtel
15:30		FCZ summary	31' (0:1) Güntensperger; 53' (0:2) Güntensperger; (yellow card) 74' Kägi	Attendance: 8,200; Referee: (Switzerland) Cornu

19 November 1995 Round 19	Servette	0–0	Zürich	Charmilles Stadium, Geneva
14:30	Barberis (yellow card) 71'; Duchosal (yellow card) 86'	FCZ summary	(yellow card) 35' Castillo; (yellow card) 77' Baldassari	Attendance: 4,800; Referee: (Switzerland) Werner Müller (Obererlinsbach)

36 November 1995 Round 20	Zürich	0–1	Sion	Letzigrund, Zürich
16:00	Güntensperger (yellow card) 68'	FCZ summary	(yellow card) 22' Kombouaré; (yellow card) 47' Sylvestre; 87' (0:1) La Placa	Attendance: 4,800; Referee: (Switzerland) Andreas Schluchter (Schönenbuch)

3 December 1995 Round 21	Zürich	1–2	Lugano	Letzigrund, Zürich
14:30	Castillo 45' (1:1); Gambino (yellow card) 73'	FCZ summary	4' (0:1) Erceg; 90' (1:2) Colombo	Attendance: 1,900; Referee: (Switzerland) Cornu
Note: Lugano player 16-year-old Mohamed Kallon (on loan from Inter Milan) has his NLA-debut.

10 December 1995 Round 22	Young Boys	2–0	Zürich	Wankdorf Stadium, Bern
14:30	Gianinazzi 55' (1:0); Aebi (yellow card) 63'; Neqrouz 82' (2:0)	FCZ summary	(yellow card) 55' Mazzarelli; (yellow card) 63' Nixon	Attendance: 1,350; Referee: (Switzerland) Carlo Bertolini (Vira-Gambarogno)

==== Qualification league table ====
Pos	Team	Pld	W	D	L	GF	GA	GD	Pts	Qualification
1	Grasshopper Club	22	13	4	5	38	22	+16	43	Advance to championship round halved points (rounded up) as bonus
2	Sion	22	13	3	6	37	28	+9	42	Advance to championship round halved points (rounded up) as bonus
3	Xamax	22	12	5	5	40	24	+16	41	Advance to championship round halved points (rounded up) as bonus
4	Luzern	22	11	7	4	36	25	+11	40	Advance to championship round halved points (rounded up) as bonus
5	Basel	22	9	3	10	23	29	−6	30	Advance to championship round halved points (rounded up) as bonus
6	Servette	22	7	7	8	28	28	0	28	Advance to championship round halved points (rounded up) as bonus
7	Aarau	22	7	6	9	36	27	+9	27	Advance to championship round halved points (rounded up) as bonus
8	St. Gallen	22	6	9	7	26	24	+2	27	Advance to championship round halved points (rounded up) as bonus
9	Lausanne-Sport	22	6	9	7	25	25	0	27	Continue to promotion/relegation round
10	Lugano	22	5	6	11	21	42	−21	21	Continue to promotion/relegation round
11	Zürich	22	4	6	12	17	32	−15	18	Continue to promotion/relegation round
12	Young Boys	22	4	5	13	14	35	−21	17	Continue to promotion/relegation round

Source: rsssf.com
Rules for classification: 1) Points; 2) Goal difference; 3) Goals scored; 4) Head-to-head points; 5) Away goals scored; 6) Draw.

==== Promotion/relegation NLA/NLB ====
The teams in the ninth to twelfth positions in Nationalliga A competed with the top four teams of the Nationalliga B in a NLA/NLB promotion/relegation round. The top four teams would play in the top-tier the following season, the other four would play in the second tier. This stage began on 25 February 1996 and ended on 14 May.

25 February 1996 Round 1	Zürich	4–1	Young Boys	Letzigrund, Zürich
14:30	Castillo 8' (1:0); Castillo 14' (2:0); Nixon 24' (3:1); Tarone (yellow card) 42'; Güntensperger (yellow card) 56'; Nonda 82' (4:1)	FCZ summary	(yellow card) 14' Sermeter; 15' (2:1) Sermeter; (yellow card) 83' Neqrouz	Attendance: 2,400; Referee: (Switzerland) Andreas Schluchter (Schönenbuch)

3 March 1996 Round 2	Étoile Carouge	0–1	Zürich	Stade de la Fontenette, Carouge
14:30		FCZ summary	(yellow card) 13' Makalakalane; (yellow card) 40' Mazzarelli; (yellow card) 72' Widmer; 86' (0:1) Nixon	Attendance: 1,600; Referee: (Switzerland) Dieter Schoch (Attiswil)

17 March 1996 Round 3	Zürich	2–2	Lausanne-Sport	Letzigrund, Zürich
14:30	Tarone 34' (1:1); Nonda 59' (2:1)	FCZ summary	32' (0:1) Sané; 83' (og 2:2) (Andersen)	Attendance: 2,450; Referee: (Switzerland) Kurt Röthlisberger (Suhr, Aargau)

24 March 1996 Round 4	Lugano	0–2	Zürich	Cornaredo, Lugano
14:30	Penzavalli (yellow card) 34'; Carrasco (yellow card) 40'; Walker (yellow card) 76'	FCZ summary	(yellow card) 18' J. Studer; (yellow card) 34' Makalakalane; 46' (0:1) J. Studer; 84' (0:2) Castillo	Attendance: 2,200; Referee: (Switzerland) Urs Meier (Wettingen and Würenlos)

31 March 1996 Round 5	Kriens	0–1	Zürich	Stadion Kleinfeld, Kriens
14:30	Stoop (yellow card) 77'	FCZ summary	88' (0:1) Nonda	Attendance: 1,400; Referee: (Switzerland) Markus Nobs (Wohlen bei Bern)

6 April 1996 Round 6	Zürich	1–1	Yverdon-Sports	Letzigrund, Zürich
20:00	Andersen (yellow card) 44'; Castillo 72' (1:0)	FCZ summary	(yellow card) 35' Innis; 78' (1:1) Innis; (yellow card) 86' Langel	Attendance: 1,600; Referee: (Switzerland) Andreas Schluchter (Schönenbuch)

14 April 1996 Round 7	SR Delémont	0–1	Zürich	La Blancherie, Delémont
20:00	Poulard (yellow card) 5'; Varga (yellow card) 74'	FCZ summary	(yellow card) 13' Huber; 52' (0:1) J. Studer	Attendance: 2,100; Referee: (Switzerland) Karl Strässle (Steinach)

18 April 1996 Round 8	Zürich	1–1	SR Delémont	Letzigrund, Zürich
20:00	Güntensperger 45' (1:0)	FCZ summary	(yellow card) 17' Kohler; 80' (1:1) Boudouma; (yellow card) 88' Gigon	Attendance: 1,300; Referee: (Switzerland) Cornu

21 April 1996 Round 9	Yverdon-Sports	1–2	Zürich	Stade Municipal, Yverdon
14:30	Sutter (yellow card) 28'; Benson 76' (1:2)	FCZ summary	18' (0:1) Güntensperger; 47' (pen.) Güntensperger; (yellow card) 90' Walker	Attendance: 1,550; Referee: (Switzerland) Carlo Bertolini (Vira-Gambarogno)

27 April 1996 Round 10	Zürich	2–1	Kriens	Letzigrund, Zürich
20:00	Hodel 17' (1:1); Güntensperger 64' (pen 2:1)	FCZ summary	9' (0:1) Zwyssig; (yellow card) 18' Londono	Attendance: 1,700; Referee: (Switzerland) Jürg Herrmann (Hinterkapplen)

30 April 1996 Round 11	Zürich	1–1	Lugano	Letzigrund, Zürich
20:00	Castillo 39' (1:0); Tarone (yellow card) 41'; Andersen (yellow card) 65'	FCZ summary	47' (pen. 1:1) Galvão; (yellow card) 60' Magnin; (yellow card) 62' Modica	Attendance: 1,500; Referee: (Switzerland) Vincent Dafflon
Note: In advance of the match FCZ announced the contract extension with head-coach Raimondo Ponte for a further year. The team was assured to remain in the top-tier for the next season 1996–97 Nationalliga A

4 May 1996 Round 12	Lausanne-Sport	2–0	Zürich	Olympique de la Pontaise, Lausanne
20:00	Sané 68' (1:0); Hänzi 72' (2:0)	FCZ summary	(yellow card) 60' J. Studer	Attendance: 1,300; Referee: (Liechtenstein) Roland Beck (Triesenberg)

11 May 1996 Round 13	Zürich	2–0	Étoile Carouge	Letzigrund, Zürich
17:30	Nonda 21' (1:0); Güntensperger 67' (pen.); Güntensperger (yellow card) 83'	FCZ summary		Attendance: 1,200; Referee: (Switzerland) Philippe Leuba (Chexbres)

14 May 1996 Round 14	Young Boys	2–1	Zürich	Wankdorf Stadium, Bern
20:00	Sermeter 4' (1:0); Prytz 24' (2:0)	FCZ summary	(yellow card) 39' Tarone; 72' (2:1) J. Studer	Attendance: 4,716; Referee: (Switzerland) Ivan Delgrosso

==== Promotion/relegation table ====
Pos	Team	Pld	W	D	L	GF	GA	GD	Pts	Qualification
1	Young Boys	14	10	3	1	28	13	+15	33	Remain in 1996–97 Nationalliga A
2	Zürich	14	8	4	2	21	12	+9	28	Remain in 1996–97 Nationalliga A
3	Lausanne-Sport	14	7	6	1	24	10	+14	27	Remain in 1996–97 Nationalliga A
4	Lugano	14	4	5	5	13	17	−4	17	Remain in 1996–97 Nationalliga A
5	Yverdon-Sport	14	3	4	7	16	22	−6	13	Remain in 1996–97 Nationalliga B
6	Delémont	14	3	4	7	17	26	−9	13	Remain in 1996–97 Nationalliga B
7	Kriens	14	2	5	7	14	22	−8	11	Remain in 1996–97 Nationalliga B
8	Etoile-Carouge	14	1	5	8	9	20	−11	8	Remain in 1996–97 Nationalliga B

Source: rsssf.com
Rules for classification: 1) Points; 2) Goal difference; 3) Goals scored; 4) Head-to-head points; 5) Away goals scored; 6) Draw.

=== Swiss Cup ===
The first-tier clubs from the 1995–96 Nationalliga A were granted byes for the first two rounds, eight of them joined the competition in this round The four clubs that were competing in the UEFA European competitions were granted byes for the third round as well. The eight participating first-tier teams were seeded and cound not be drawn against each other. The draw respected regionalities, when possible, and the lower classed team was granted home advantage.

24 September 1995 Round 3	Red Star	1–4	Zürich	Allmend Brunau, Zürich
	Kocatürk 27' (1:1); Waldvogel (yellow card); Righetti (yellow card)	FCZ summary	3' (0:1) Andersen; (red card) 27' Tarone; 32' (1:2) Andersen; 34' (1:3) Di Jorio; 80' (1:4) Castillo; (yellow card) Andersen	Attendance: 1,500; Referee: (Switzerland) Marcel Vollenweider (Rüti, Zürich)

9 March 1996 Round 4	Tuggen	0–2	Zürich	Linthstrasse, Tuggen
	Wild (yellow card) 65'	FCZ summary	40' (0:1) Hodel; (yellow card) 64' Andersen; (yellow card) 70' Hodel; 82' (0:2) Di Jorio	Attendance: 2,100; Referee: (Switzerland) Hans Stadler

21 March 1996 Round 5	Aarau	2–0	Zürich	Stadion Brügglifeld, Aarau
	Ćirić 1' (1:0); Ćirić (yellow card) 18'; Ćirić 57' (2:0)	FCZ summary FCA summary	(yellow card) 29' (yellow-red card) 72' Walker; (yellow card) 68' Nonda	Attendance: 2,800; Referee: (Switzerland) Kurt Zuppinger (Bremgarten, Aargau)

=== Friendly matches ===
==== Pre-season ====
3 July 1995 Exhibition game	Kriens	2–2	Zürich	Littau
	Ndlovu 4' (1:0); Esposito 70' (2:1)	FCZ summary	43' (1:1) Nixon; 76' (2:2) Di Jorio	Attendance: 450

7 July 1995 Exhibition game	Zürich	3–1	St. Gallen	Sportanlage Frohberg, Stäfa
	Baldassari 51' (1:1); Fischer 75' (2:1); Disler (yellow card) 77'; Gambino 86' (3:1)	FCZ summary	17' (0:1) Fonseca; (yellow card) 40' Galič; (yellow card) 45' Winkler; (yellow card) 57' Tejeda; (yellow card) 68' Mouidi	Attendance: 700; Referee: (Switzerland) Karl Strässle (Steinach)

9 July 1995 Exhibition game	Grasshopper Club	1–0	Zürich	Sportanlage Frohberg, Stäfa
	Gämperle (yellow card) 54'; Udi (yellow card) 72'; Udi 84' (pen.); Vega (yellow card) 87'	FCZ summary	(yellow card) 67' Makalakalane	Attendance: 1,800; Referee: (Switzerland) Marcel Vollenweider (Rüti and Wald)

11 July 1995 Exhibition game	FC Bülach	0–3	Zürich	Stadion Erachfeld, Bülach
		FCZ summary	22' (0:1) Makalakalane; 48' (pen.) Tarone; 75' (0:3) Di Jorio	Attendance: 700; Referee: (Switzerland) Gugler
Note: 2-day international tournament in Bülach, semi-final

12 July 1995 Exhibition game	Zürich	4–1	Baden	Stadion Erachfeld, Bülach
	Hoeks 29' (1:0); Mazzarelli 60' (2:1); Hoeks 68' (3:1); Hoeks 69' (4:1)	FCZ summary	45' (pen.)	Attendance: 800
Note: 2-day international tournament in Bülach, final

14 July 1995 Exhibition game	Schaffhausen	0–2	Zürich	Stadion Breite, Schaffhausen
		FCZ summary	75' (0:1) Güntensperger; 85' (0:2) Nixon	Attendance: 350

==== Winter break ====
4 February 1996 Exhibition game	Sion	3–3	Zürich	Stade des Plantys, Vétroz
	Mirandinha 23' (1:1); Vidmar 38' (2:3); Zambaz 57' (3:3)	FCZ summary	2' (0:1) Baldassari; 29' (1:2) Baldassari; 30' (1:3) Nonda	Attendance: 1,300

7 February 1996 Exhibition game	Zürich	2–2	Grazer AK	Telese Terme
	Nixon; Güntensperger	FCZ summary	Goal

10 February 1996 Exhibition game	US Salernitana	1–1	Zürich	Chiasso
	Goal	FCZ summary	30' Güntensperger

11 February 1996 Exhibition game	Chiasso	2–0	Zürich	Stadio Riva Quarto, Chiasso
	Goal	FCZ summary

14 February 1996 Exhibition game	Basel	1–1	Zürich	Athletics Stadium, Basel
14:30	Moser 1' (1:0)	FCZ summary FCB summary	82' (1:1) Nonda	Attendance: 500; Referee: (Switzerland) Kurt Röthlisberger (Suhr)

18 February 1996 Exhibition game	Grasshopper Club	0–1	Zürich	Förrlibuck (Training grounds GC), Zürich
		FCZ summary	3' (0:1) Nonda	Attendance: 500; Referee: (Switzerland) Andreas Schluchter (Schönenbuch)

== Sources ==
- dbFCZ Homepage
- Switzerland 1995–96 at RSSSF

Preceded by 1994–95	FC Zürich seasons	Succeeded by 1996–97
