= 1994–95 Swiss Cup =

Tournament details
- Country: Switzerland
- Teams: 180

Final positions
- Champions: FC Sion
- Runners-up: Grasshopper Club

Tournament statistics
- Matches played: 179

The 1993–94 Swiss Cup was the 70th season of Switzerland's football cup competition organised annually by the Swiss Football Association. The competition began on 13 August with the first games of Round 1 and ended on 5 June 1995 with the Final held at Wankdorf in Bern. The cup winners earned a place in the qualifying round of the UEFA Cup Winners' Cup.

== Overview ==
The competition began on the week-end of 13–14 August 1994 with the games of the first round and ended on Whit Monday 5 June 1995 with the final held at the former Wankdorf Stadium in Bern. The 16 clubs from the reduced in size Nationalliga B were granted byes for the first round. The 12 clubs from the Nationalliga A were granted byes for the first two rounds. The winners of the cup qualified themselves for the first round of the Cup Winners' Cup in the next season.

The draw was respecting regionalities, when possible, and the lower classed team was granted home advantage. In the entire competition, the matches were played in a single knockout format. In the event of a draw after 90 minutes, the match went into extra time. In the event of a draw at the end of extra time, a penalty shoot-out was to decide which team qualified for the next round. No replays were foreseen.

== Round 1 ==
In the first round a total of 152 amateur clubs participated from the third-tier and lower. Reserve teams were not admitted to the competition. The 42 teams from the 1994–95 1. Liga were seeded and cound not be drawn against each other. The draw respected regionalities, when possible, and the lower classed team was granted home advantage.

Teams from the 2. Liga (fourth-tier) against teams from the 1. Liga:

Team 1	Score	Team 2
13–14 August 1994
FC Fortuna (SG)	1–3	Chur
BC Albisrieden	0–1	FC Altstetten (Zürich)
AC Sementina	0–5	Chiasso
FC Collex-Bossy	2–2 (a.e.t.) (4–5 p)	Stade Nyonnais
FC Herzogenbuchsee	0–3	Wangen bei Olten
Kreuzlingen	2–0	St. Otmar
Meyrin	2–5	FC Renens
FC Töss (Winterthur)	0–3	Freienbach
FC Turicum	1–2	Red Star
FC Muri-Gümlingen	2–5	Thun
FC Lenzburg	4–1	Buochs
FC Montlingen	2–5	FC Rorschach
FC Grandson-Tuileries	0–3	Colombier
Uster	1–4	FC Stäfa
FC Noiraigue	2–1	La Chaux-de-Fonds
FC Au	1–3	FC Altstätten (St. Gallen)
Burgdorf	2–1	FC Klus-Balstahl
FC Cologny-Geneva	0–6	Grand-Lancy
FC Leytron	2–0	FC Fully
Schöftland	2–1	FC Muri (AG)
Baulmes	2–4	FC Le Locle
FC Orbe	0–3	Serrières
FC Apples-Ballens	1–6	Signal FC (Bernex)
FC Beauregard Fribourg	3–3 (a.e.t.) (3–4 p)	Fribourg
FC Beringen	1–3	YF Juventus
FC Breitenbach	1–4	Old Boys
CS La Tour-de-Peilz	0–3	Vevey Sports
FC Winkeln St.Gallen	1–4	Brühl
Biel-Bienne	2–2 (a.e.t.) (2–4 p)	Bulle
FC Conthey	2–0	Stade Lausanne
FC Sierre	0–4	FC Naters
FC Cornol	0–8	FC Riehen
FC Oftringen	2–1	Emmenbrücke
FC Rüti ZH	4–2	FC Wiedikon
FC Therwil	2–2 (a.e.t.) (1–2 p)	FC Pratteln
Zofingen	0–5	FC Sursee
FC Belfaux	5–3	Moutier
FC Birsfelden	2–4	Concordia Basel
FC Riddes	1–2	Montreux-Sports
FC Salgesch	2–6	Martigny-Sports
US Terre Sainte	1–2	Le Mont-sur-Lausanne
FC Domdidier	2–1	ASI Audax-Friul
FC Morbio	1–1 (a.e.t.) (5–3 p)	FC Ascona
FC Maggia	3–2	FC Tresa-Monteggio

Teams from the 3. Liga (fifth-tier) against teams from the 1. Liga:

Team 1	Score	Team 2
13–14 August 1994
Losone Sportiva	0–1	Mendrisio
Kirchberg SG	1–0	FC Glarus
FC Trimbach	0–2	FC Kölliken
FC Schmerikon	1–5	FC Brüttisellen
FC Konolfingen	1–7	SV Lyss
FC Olympic Fahy	1–2	Laufen
FC Frutigen	1–6	Münsingen
FC Roche	0–10	Monthey
SV Sissach	1–6	FC Suhr
FC Eschenbach	1–4	Frauenfeld

Teams from the 4. Liga (sixth-tier) against teams from the 1. Liga:

Team 1	Score	Team 2
14 August 1994
SC Obergeissenstein	1–4	Zug 94

Teams from the 2. Liga amongst themselves:

Team 1	Score	Team 2
13–14 August 1994
Muttenz	0–2	Dornach
FC Volketswil	5–0	FC Wettswil-Bonstetten
FC Fontainemelon	2–1	FC Le Landeron
Central Fribourg	2–3	FC Bözingen 34
FC Seefeld Zürich	5–4	SV Seebach (Zürich)
FC Subingen	4–0	FC Deitingen
FC Altdorf (Uri)	3–2	Stabio
FC Seon	1–8	FC Hergiswil
FC Onex	3–1	FC Chêne-Aubonne
Schötz	5–1	FC Olten
FC Tägerwilen	1–1 (a.e.t.) (0–3 p)	Rapperswil-Jona

Teams from the 3. Liga against teams from the 2. Liga:

Team 1	Score	Team 2
13–14 August 1994
FC Perlen-Buchrain	0–5	Ibach
FC Hinwil	2–0	FC Affoltern am Albis
FC Court	1–4	FC Courtepin
FC Niederurnen	2–5	FC Uznach
SV Meiringen	1–5	FC Wyler Bern
FC Thayngen	2–5	FC Horgen
FC Bremgarten	1–0	FC Küssnacht am Rigi
FC Lachen	1–1 (a.e.t.) (4–3 p)	FC Wädenswil

Teams from the 3. Liga amongst themselves:

Team 1	Score	Team 2
14 August 1994
FC Bottens	3–2	FC Versoix
FC Brunnen	1–2	FC Alpnach

== Round 2 ==
The teams from the 1994–95 Nationalliga B were granted byes for the first round and joined the competition in the second round. These 16 teams were seeded and cound not be drawn against each other. The draw respected regionalities, when possible, and the lower classed team was granted home advantage.

Teams from the 1. Liga (third-tier) against teams from the NLB:

Team 1	Score	Team 2
2–3–4 September 1994
Grand-Lancy	3–1	Étoile Carouge
YF Juventus	3–0	Gossau
Vevey Sports	1–2	Chênois
FC Le Locle	0–1	Yverdon-Sports
FC Stäfa	1–2	FC Schaffhausen
Mendrisio	0–2	Locarno
Zug 94	0–2	Solothurn

Teams from the 2. Liga (fourth-tier) against teams from the NLB:

Team 1	Score	Team 2
2–3–4 September 1994
FC Morbio	0–6	Bellinzona
FC Châtel-St-Denis	0–5	Delémont
FC Noiraigue	0–4	Echallens
FC Hergiswil	0–5	Grenchen
FC Altstätten (St. Gallen)	0–8	Tuggen
Wangen bei Olten	0–4	Kriens

Teams from the 2. Liga (fourth-tier) against teams from the NLB:

Team 1	Score	Team 2
2–3–4 September 1994
FC Alpnach	0–5	Baden
FC Kirchberg (SG)	0–13	Wil
FC Hinwil	1–4	Winterthur

Teams from the 1. Liga amongst themselves:

Team 1	Score	Team 2
2–3–4 September 1994
Signal FC (Bernex)	5–5	Montreux-Sports
FC Raron	0–1	Martigny-Sports
Le Mont-sur-Lausanne	2–3	FC Renens
Stade Nyonnais	1–0	FC Naters
Fribourg	3–2	Serrières
Thun	3–1	SV Lyss
FC Uznach	4–2 (a.e.t.)	Frauenfeld
Chur	0–1	FC Altstetten (Zürich)

Teams from the 2. Liga against teams from the 1. Liga:

Team 1	Score	Team 2
2–3–4 September 1994
FC Belfaux	2–6	Bulle
FC Conthey	1–4	Urania Genève Sport
FC Leytron	2–5	Monthey
FC Fontainemelon	0–4	Colombier
FC Bözingen 34	2–1	Münsingen
FC Wyler Bern	1–4	Bümpliz
FC Subingen	4–1 (a.e.t.)	FC Kölliken
Ibach	1–3	Old Boys
FC Oftringen	0–1	FC Sursee
Burgdorf	6–1	FC Pratteln
FC Lenzburg	1–6	FC Suhr
FC Seefeld Zürich	0–0 (a.e.t.) (2–4 p)	Red Star
FC Horgen	0–3	Brühl
FC Brüttisellen	1–3	Freienbach
FC Maggia	0–4	Chiasso

Teams from the 3. Liga against teams from the 1. Liga:

Team 1	Score	Team 2
4 September 1994
FC Bremgarten	1–1 (a.e.t.) (5–6 p)	FC Riehen

Teams from the 2. Liga amongst themselves:

Team 1	Score	Team 2
2–3–4 September 1994
FC Courtepin	3–3 (a.e.t.) (2–4 p)	FC Domdidier
FC Altdorf (Uri)	0–3	Dornach
Laufen	1–0 (a.e.t.)	Concordia Basel
Schöftland	1–5	Schötz
FC Rüti (ZH)	4–1	FC Rorschach
FC Volketswil	0–3	Rapperswil-Jona

Teams from the 3. Liga against teams from the 2. Liga:

Team 1	Score	Team 2
4 September 1994
FC Bottens	2–3	FC Onex
FC Lachen	2–0	Kreuzlingen

== Round 3 ==
The first-tier teams from the 1994–95 Nationalliga A were granted byes for the first two rounds, eight of them joined the competition in this round. The four that were engaged im the European competitions were granted byes for this round as well. The eight participating teams were seeded and cound not be drawn against each other. The draw respected regionalities, when possible, and the lower classed team was granted home advantage.

=== Summary ===
Team 1	Score	Team 2
16 September 1994
FC Onex	0–9	Xamax
24 September 1994
FC Altstetten (Zürich)	1–2 (a.e.t.)	Baden
FC Subingen	2–0	Locarno
Burgdorf	3–2	Colombier
FC Lachen	3–4	Red Star
FC Uznach	1–3	Brühl
Dornach	2–4	Luzern
Old Boys	1–2	FC Riehen
FC Renens	1–0	Grand-Lancy
Schötz	0–1	Chiasso
Solothurn	2–2 (a.e.t.) (6–7 p)	Young Boys
FC Suhr	0–2	Lugano
FC Rüti	2–3	Freienbach
FC Domdidier	2–1	Urania Genève Sport
FC Schaffhausen	1–0	St. Gallen
25 September 1994
FC Bözingen 34	0–5	Basel
Bulle	1–2	Delémont
YF Juventus	0–1	FC Wil
Bümpliz	0–2	Grenchen
Echallens	0–5	Yverdon-Sport
Laufen	0–2	FC Sursee
Monthey	4–2	Lausanne-Sport
Rapperswil-Jona	2–4	Tuggen
Thun	3–0	Fribourg
Stade Nyonnais	0–0 (a.e.t.) (4–2 p)	Signal FC (Bernex)
Winterthur	1–2	Zürich
Kriens	2–3	Bellinzona
Martigny-Sports	1–3	Chênois

- Aarau, Grasshopper Club, Servette and Sion were granted byes for this round.

=== Matches ===
16 September 1994

FC Onex	0–9	Xamax
	RSSSF summary	4' (0:1) Wiederkehr; 6' (0:2) Wiederkehr; 32' (0:3) Wiederkehr; 62' (0:4) Gottardi; 66' (0:5) Wiederkehr; 71' (0:6) Gottardi; 75' (0:7) Henchoz; 78' (0:8) Chassot; 81' (0:8) Wiederkehr

Stade municipal d'Onex

24 September 1994

Solothurn	2–2 (a.e.t.)	Young Boys
Moulin 64' (1:1); Taddei 120' (pen. 2:2)	YB summary	55' (0:1) Moser; 112' (1:2) Giallanza
Penalties
Taddei (penalty scored); Moulin (penalty missed); Membrez (penalty scored) du Buisson (penalty scored); Loosli (penalty scored); Eberhard (penalty scored); H.R. Baumann (penalty scored); Uebelhart (penalty missed)	6–7	(penalty scored) Christensen; (penalty scored) Sutter; (penalty missed) Neqrouz; (penalty scored) Küffer; (penalty scored) Giallanza; (penalty scored) A. Baumann; (penalty scored) Lengen; (penalty scored) Agostino

Stadion FC Solothurn, Solothurn
Attendance: 2,600
Referee: (Switzerland) Karl Strässle (Steinach)

25 September 1994
14:30

FC Bözingen 34	0–5	Basel
Born (yellow card) 42'; Gallo (yellow card) 44'	FCB summary	59' (0:1) Gigon; 66' (0:2) Hertig; 71' (0:3) Rey; 85' (0:4) Hertig; 90+3' (0:5) Zuffi

Sportplatz Längfeld, Biel/Bienne
Attendance: 3,000
Referee: (Switzerland) Francis Fischer

25 September 1994

Winterthur	1–2	Zürich
Saykouk 63' (1:1)	FCZ summary	47' (0:1) Møller; 90' (1:2) Møller

Schützenwiese, Winterthur
Attendance: 3,700
Referee: (Switzerland) Marcel Vollenweider (Rüti, Zürich)

== Round 4 ==
=== Summary ===
Team 1	Score	Team 2
18 March 1995
Burgdorf	0–5	Lugano
Red Star	0–1	Luzern
FC Renens	1–3 (a.e.t.)	Sion
Basel	3–0	Aarau
19 March 1995
Baden	0–2	Grenchen
Brühl	0–0 (a.e.t.) (4–5 p)	Young Boys
Chênois	2–0	Yverdon-Sport
FC Chiasso	0–2	Zürich
Delémont	2–1	Xamax
FC Sursee	0–2	Grasshopper Club
Thun	1–2	Bellinzona
FC Wil	3–0	Tuggen
FC Domdidier	3–3 (a.e.t.) (4–2 p)	Stade Nyonnais
Freienbach	2–1	FC Riehen
Monthey	2–4 (a.e.t.)	Servette
FC Subingen	0–4	FC Schaffhausen

=== Matches ===
18 March 1995
20:00

Basel	3–0	Aarau
Zuffi 45' (1:0); Walker (yellow card) 85'; Hertig 86' (2:0); Šarić 88' (3:0)	FCB summary	(yellow card) 72' Bader

St. Jakob Stadium, Basel
Attendance: 12,000
Referee: (Switzerland) Kurt Zuppinger (Bremgarten, Aargau)

19 March 1995

Brühl	0–0 (a.e.t.)	Young Boys
	YB summary
Penalties
Aktas (penalty missed); Weber (penalty missed); Domeisen (penalty scored); Tsawa (penalty scored); Hutter (penalty scored); Rentzmann (penalty scored); Pedron (penalty missed)	4–5	(penalty missed) Neqrouz; (penalty scored) Giallanza; (penalty scored) Trzeciak; (penalty missed) Sutter; (penalty scored) Ippoliti; (penalty scored) Christensen; (penalty scored) Baumann

Paul-Grüninger-Stadion, St. Gallen
Attendance: 1,350
Referee: (Switzerland) Marcel Vollenweider (Rüti, Zürich)

19 March 1995

FC Chiasso	0–2	Zürich
Lorenzi (yellow card) 8'	FCZ summary	(yellow card) 9' Mazzarelli; 39' (0:1) Møller; 63' (0:2) Škoro; (yellow card) 73' Walker

Stadio Comunale Riva IV, Chiasso
Attendance: 1,000
Referee: (Liechtenstein) Roland Beck (Triesenberg)

19 March 1995

FC Sursee	0–2	Grasshopper Club
	RSSSF summary	45' (0:1) Lombardo; 67' (pen.) Gren

Stadion Schlottermilch, Sursee

19 March 1995

Monthey	2–4 (a.e.t.)	Servette
Gabbud 22' (1:0); Gabbud 64' (2:2)	Servette summary	20' (1:1) Renato; 54' (1:1) Moro; 99' (2:3) Moro; 115' (2:4) Renato

Stade Philippe Pottier, Monthey

== Round 5 ==
=== Summary ===
Team 1	Score	Team 2
15 April 1995
Grasshopper Club	1–0	Lugano
17 April 1995
Chênois	2–3 (a.e.t.)	Bellinzona
Young Boys	1–1 (a.e.t.) (5–4 p)	Servette
FC Domdidier	0–1	FC Schaffhausen
Freienbach	0–9	Sion
Luzern	2–0	Basel
FC Wil	1–0	Zürich
Grenchen	0–2	Delémont

=== Matches ===
15 April 1995

Grasshopper Club	1–0	Lugano
Lombardo 66' (1:0)	RSSSF summary

Hardturm, Zürich

17 April 1995

Young Boys	1–1 (a.e.t.)	Servette
Ippoliti	YB summary Servette summary	61' (0:1) Barberis
Penalties
Christensen (penalty scored); Baumann (penalty missed); Küffer (penalty scored); Giallanza (penalty scored); Ippoliti (penalty scored); Lengen (penalty scored)	5–4	(penalty scored) Sinval; (penalty scored) Renato; (penalty missed) Djurovski; (penalty scored) Margarini; (penalty scored) Schepull; (penalty missed) Sesa

Wankdorf Stadium, Bern
Attendance: 8,000
Referee: (Switzerland) Fredy Philippoz (Sion)

17 April 1995

Freienbach	0–9	Sion
	RSSSF summary	8' (0:1) Assis; 22' (0:2) Giannini; 26' (0:3) Bonvin; 36' (0:4) Ouattara; 42' (0:5) Moser; 55' (0:6) Bonvin; 60' (0:7) Ouattara; 62' (0:8) Kunz; 65' (0:9) Kunz

Chrummen, Freienbach

17 April 1995
17:00

Luzern	2–0	Basel
Wolf 30' (1:0); Güntensperger 59' (2:0); Gmür (yellow card) 64'; Wyss (yellow card) 81'	FCB summary	(yellow card) 21' Meier; (yellow card) 54' Ceccaroni; (red card) 81' Gigon

Stadion Allmend, Luzern
Attendance: 22,500
Referee: (Switzerland) Gottfried Friedrich (Seedorf, Uri)

17 April 1995

FC Wil	1–0	Zürich
Buhl 36' (1:0); Besio (yellow card) 58'; Schürmann (yellow card) 76'; Baur (yellow card) 80'	FCZ summary	(yellow card) 54' Şahin; (yellow card) 80' Tarone

Stadion Bergholz, Wil
Attendance: 2,800
Referee: (Switzerland) Vincent Dafflon

== Quarter-finals ==
=== Summary ===
Team 1	Score	Team 2
2 May 1995
FC Wil	0–2	Grasshopper Club
Bellinzona	0–1	Sion
Luzern	0–1	Young Boys
FC Schaffhausen	1–2	Delémont

=== Matches ===
2 May 1995

FC Wil	0–2	Grasshopper Club
	RSSSF summary	26' (0:1) Magnin; 70' (0:2) Rzasa

Stadion Bergholz, Wil

2 May 1995

Bellinzona	0–1	Sion
	RSSSF summary	66' (0:1) Kunz

Stadio Comunale, Bellinzona

2 May 1995

Luzern	0–1	Young Boys
	YB summary	89' (0:1) Giallanza

Stadion Allmend, Luzern
Attendance: 11,600
Referee: (Switzerland) Kurt Röthlisberger (Suhr, Aargau)

2 May 1995

FC Schaffhausen	1–2	Delémont
Beer 90' (1:2)	RSSSF summary	19' (0:1) Olaru; 83' (0:2) Vukic

Stadion Breite, Schaffhausen

== Semi-finals ==
=== Summary ===
Team 1	Score	Team 2
16 May 1995
Sion	6–1	Delémont
Young Boys	1–2 (a.e.t.)	Grasshopper Club

=== Matches ===
16 May 1995

Sion	6–1	Delémont
Bonvin 36' (1:0); Bonvin 57' (2:0); Kunz 65' (3:0); Fournier 74' (4:1); Moser 76' (5:1); Ouattara 86' (6:1)	RSSSF summary	72' (3:1) Marcolli

Stade Tourbillon, Sion
Attendance: 8,000
Referee: (Switzerland) Claude Détruche (Thônex)

16 May 1995

Young Boys	1–2 (a.e.t.)	Grasshopper Club
Küffer 33' (1:0)	YB summary	65' (1:1) Magnin; 108' (1:2) Sermeter

Wankdorf Stadium, Bern
Attendance: 8,000
Referee: (Switzerland) Serge Muhmenthaler (Grenchen)

== Final ==
=== Summary ===
Team 1	Score	Team 2
5 June 1995
Sion	4–2	Grasshopper Club

=== Telegram ===
5 June 1995
15:00

Sion	4–2	Grasshopper Club
Ouattara 5' (1:0); Assis 40' (pen. 2:0); Bonvin 68' (3:1); Ouattara 84' (4:2)	Fussball-Schweiz summary	52' (2:1) Vega; 70' (3:2) Willems

Wankdorf, Bern
Attendance: 35,000
Referee: (Switzerland) Werner Müller (Obererlinsbach)

Sion won the cup and this was the club's seventh cup title in their seventh final to this date.

== See also ==
- 1994–95 Nationalliga A
- 1994–95 Nationalliga B
- 1994–95 Swiss 1. Liga

== Sources and references ==
- Switzerland 1994/95 at RSSSF

Preceded by 1993–94	Seasons in Swiss Cup	Succeeded by 1995–96
