= 2020–21 Accra Great Olympics F.C. season =

Accra Great Olympics F.C.
- Manager: Annor Walker
- Stadium: Accra Sports Stadium; Accra, Greater Accra, Ghana
- Premier League: 2nd
- Top goalscorer: Maxwell Abbey Quaye (6)
Home colours	Away colours
- All statistics correct as of 11 April 2021.

2021–21 season of Ghanaian club Accra Great Olympics F.C.

== Pre-season and friendlies ==
The season was delayed as a result of COVID-19 pandemic.

== Squad ==
=== Roaster beginning of season ===
As of 1 January 2021

Note: Flags indicate national team as defined under FIFA eligibility rules; some limited exceptions apply. Players may hold more than one non-FIFA nationality.

No.	Pos.	Nation	Player
1	GK	GHA	Benjamin Asare
2	DF	GHA	Jamal Deen Haruna
3	FW	GHA	Sunday Alhassan
4	DF	GHA	Samuel Ashie Quaye
5	DF	GHA	Philip Nii Kojo Sackey
6	DF	GHA	Matthew Ofori Dunga
7	FW	GHA	Maxwell Abbey Quaye (vice-captain)
8	MF	GHA	Michel Otou
9	MF	GHA	Roger Sackey
10	MF	GHA	Gladson Awako (captain)
11	MF	GHA	Michael Yeboah
12	MF	GHA	Godfred Odametey
13	FW	GHA	Tijani Ahmed

No.	Pos.	Nation	Player
14	FW	GHA	Abdul Manaf Mudasiru
15	DF	GHA	Stephan Sowah
16	GK	GHA	Saed Salifu
17	MF	GHA	David Amuzu
18	MF	GHA	Mujeed Abdul Hakeem
19	DF	GHA	Eric Osei Bonsu
20	MF	GHA	Charles Danso Otu
21	DF	GHA	Razak Kasim
22	GK	GHA	Stephen Kwaku
23	MF	GHA	Mustapha Zakaria
24	FW	GHA	Arnold Abbey Mensah
25	MF	GHA	Hamza Zakari
26	DF	GHA	Ebenezer Sekyere

== League ==
- 2020–21 Ghana Premier League

=== Matches ===
Date	Opponents	H / A	Result F–A
15 November 2020	Medeama SC	A	1–1
20 November 2020	Legon Cities	H	3–0
17 December 2020	Asante Kotoko	A	0–1
24 December 2020	Cape Coast Ebusua Dwarfs	H	1–1
13 December 2020	Liberty Professionals	A	2–0
20 December 2020	West African Football Academy	H	1–0
3 January 2021	Aduana Stars	A	2–1
10 January 2021	Ashanti Gold	H	1–2
15 January 2021	International Allies	A	0–2
23 January 2021	Karela United	H	0–0
30 January 2021	Accra Hearts of Oak	A	0–2
2 February 2021	King Faisal Babes	H	3–1
7 February 2021	Bechem United	A	3–1
16 February 2021	Elimina Sharks	H	1–0
21 February 2021	Eleven Wonders	A	1–0
26 February 2021	Berekum Chelsea FC	H	1–0
7 March 2021	Dreams FC	A	0–1
2 April 2021	Medeama SC	H	1–0
11 April 2021	Legon Cities	A	2–0
16 April 2021	Asante Kotoko	H	

== Squad statistics ==
=== Goalscorers ===
Includes all competitive matches. The list is sorted alphabetically by surname when total goals are equal.

Rank	No.	Pos.	Player	Premier League	FA Cup	Total
1	7	FW	(Ghana) Maxwell Abbey Quaye	6	0	6
2	10	MF	(Ghana) Gladson Awako	4	0	4
2	11	FW	(Ghana) Michael Yeboah	4	0	4
4	20	DF	(Ghana) Samuel Ashie Quaye	3	0	3
5	26	MF	(Ghana) Charles Danso Otu	3	0	3
6	31	DF	(Ghana) Thomas Darlington	1	0	1
Own goals						
Totals				25	0	25

=== Clean sheets ===
The list is sorted by shirt number when total clean sheets are equal. Numbers in parentheses represent games where both goalkeepers participated and both kept a clean sheet; the number in parentheses is awarded to the goalkeeper who was substituted on, whilst a full clean sheet is awarded to the goalkeeper who was on the field at the start of play.

			Clean sheets		
No.	Player	Games Played	Premier League	FA Cup	Total
1	(Ghana) Benjamin Asare	8	5	0	5
16	(Ghana) Saed Salifu	10	4	0	4
22	(Ghana) Stephen Kwaku	0	0	0	0
Totals			9	0	9

== Awards ==
=== Ghana Premier League Player of the Month ===
Month	Player	Ref.
December	(Ghana) Gladon Awako	

== Managers ==
In December 2020, Annor Walker took a health leave and Yaw Preko and Godwin Attram were brought in as head coach and assistant, respectively. He later resumed in February 2021.

- Annor Walker (head coach) 2020–
- Yaw Preko (assistant head coach) 2020–2021
- Godwin Attram (assistant head coach) 2020–2021
