= Hamza Zakari =

Hamza Zakari may refer to:

- Hamza Zakari (footballer)
- Hamza Zakari (politician)
