= Michael Yeboah =

Ghanaian footballer (born 2001)

Personal information
- Date of birth: 3 May 2001 (age 25)
- Place of birth: Accra, Ghana
- Height: 5 ft 6 in (1.68 m)
- Position: Midfielder

Team information
- Current team: Las Vegas Lights (on loan from Accra Great Olympics)
- Number: 17

Youth career
- –2020: Attram De Visser Soccer Academy

Senior career*
Years	Team	Apps	(Gls)
2020–	Accra Great Olympics	16	(4)
2021–	→ Las Vegas Lights (loan)	12	(0)
- * Club domestic league appearances and goals as of 8 November 2021

Michael Yeboah (born 3 May 2001) is a Ghanaian professional footballer who currently plays as a midfielder for USL Championship club Las Vegas Lights FC on loan from Accra Great Olympics. He gained prominence after scoring a winning goal against Ghana Premier League giants Kumasi Asante Kotoko.

== Career ==
=== Early career ===
Yeboah played for Ghana Division Two League side Attram De Visser Soccer Academy before moving to Accra Great Olympics.

=== Great Olympics ===
==== 2020–21 season ====
Ahead of the 2020–21 Ghana Premier League season, Yeboah moved to Accra Great Olympics. He was named on the team's squad list for that season. He made his debut during the first match of the season on 15 November 2020 against Medeama SC, in the process scoring his first goal of the season in the 73rd minute after coming on as a substitute to help them salvage a 1–1 draw. On 17 December 2020, he started his first match of the season and scored the only goal in a 1–0 win against Asante Kotoko to give Kotoko their first defeat of the season. He scored by heading in a cross from club captain Gladson Awako. As part of Kotoko's sponsorship deal with Hisense, Yeboah was to receive GH₵ 5,000 for scoring a winning goal against the club. In February 2021, the company fulfilled their pledge and presented a cheque to him.

On 2 February 2021, he was named man of the match after scoring a goal in a 3–1 win against King Faisal Babies. The win helped Olympics move back to 2nd place. On 26 February 2021, he scored his 4th goal of the season after scoring the only goal in a match against Berekum Chelsea.

He was nominated for the NASCO Player of the Month Award for February after scoring two goals and picking up three man of the match awards. The award was eventually won by Dreams FC striker Joseph Esso.

==== Las Vegas Lights (loan) ====
On 5 April 2021, Yeboah joined USL Championship side Las Vegas Lights FC on loan ahead of the 2021 season.
