= Christopher Nettey =

Ghanaian footballer

Personal information
- Full name: Christopher Nakai Nettey
- Date of birth: 17 July 1998 (age 28)
- Place of birth: Accra, Ghana
- Position: Right-back

Team information
- Current team: Dynamos
- Number: 23

Youth career
- Attram De Visser SA

Senior career*
Years	Team	Apps	(Gls)
- Attram De Visser SA
2017	→ Great Olympics (loan)	11	(0)
2019–2022	Asante Kotoko	57	(1)
2023–2024	Great Olympics	39	(2)
2025	Nations FC	14	(0)
2026–	Dynamos		

International career^{‡}
2020–2021	Ghana	2	(0)
- * Club domestic league appearances and goals as of 4 September 2026 ‡ National team caps and goals as of 4 September 2026

Christopher Nakai Nettey (born 17 July 1998) is a Ghanaian professional footballer who plays as a right-back for Zimbabwean club Dynamos. He has also represented the Ghana national football team.

Nettey began his career with Attram De Visser Soccer Academy and had an early loan spell with Great Olympics before joining Asante Kotoko in 2019. He established himself as a regular at Kotoko and was part of the team that won the 2021–22 Ghana Premier League. After leaving the club in 2022, he returned to Great Olympics and later played for Nations FC before moving to Dynamos in 2026.

== Club career ==
=== Early career ===
Nettey began his career with Attram De Visser Soccer Academy in Accra. In January 2017, he was one of ten players from the academy's under-19 side who joined Great Olympics on a season-long loan ahead of the 2017 Ghanaian Premier League.

He made his Ghana Premier League debut for Great Olympics on 18 February 2017, starting and playing the full match in a 3–1 away defeat to Ashanti Gold.

=== Asante Kotoko ===
In December 2019, Nettey joined Asante Kotoko from Attram De Visser Soccer Academy on a three-year contract. He quickly established himself as a regular at right-back and made 13 league appearances during the truncated 2019–20 Ghana Premier League season, winning three NASCO Man of the Match awards.

Nettey remained a regular during the 2020–21 season, making 24 league appearances. On 20 January 2021, he scored his first league goal for Kotoko, heading in the winning goal in a 1–0 victory over Ebusua Dwarfs. His performance earned him the man of the match award.

During the 2021–22 season, Nettey made 18 league appearances as Asante Kotoko won the Ghana Premier League title, the club's first league championship in eight years.

Nettey left Asante Kotoko in December 2022 following the expiration of his three-year contract after negotiations over a renewal were unsuccessful. He made 62 appearances in all competitions during his time with the club, scoring once.

=== Return to Great Olympics ===
On 25 January 2023, Nettey returned to Great Olympics on a free transfer following his departure from Asante Kotoko. He made 19 league appearances and scored twice during the remainder of the 2022–23 Ghana Premier League season. On the final day of the season, he scored in a 2–1 victory over Nsoatreman, helping Great Olympics secure their Ghana Premier League status.

Nettey remained with Great Olympics for the 2023–24 season, making 20 league appearances. The club was relegated from the Ghana Premier League at the end of the season.

Following Great Olympics' relegation at the end of the 2023–24 season, Nettey became a free agent. He subsequently joined Futsal Premier League side Blessed Kickers on a short-term deal to maintain his fitness while seeking a return to association football. He scored on his futsal debut in a 4–3 victory over Adenta Youth.

=== Nations FC ===
In January 2025, Nettey returned to the Ghana Premier League after joining Nations FC on a free transfer. He made 14 league appearances for the club during the remainder of the 2024–25 Ghana Premier League season.

=== Dynamos ===
In March 2026, Nettey moved abroad to join Zimbabwean Premier Soccer League club Dynamos. He made an immediate impact at the club, earning a place in the starting lineup during their competitive fixtures.

== International career ==
In November 2020, Nettey received a late call-up to the Ghana national football team for the 2021 Africa Cup of Nations qualifying double-header against Sudan, after Harrison Afful was withdrawn due to an injury.

He made his senior international debut on 12 November 2020, starting at right-back as Ghana defeated Sudan 2–0 at the Cape Coast Sports Stadium.

== Honours ==
Asante Kotoko

- Ghana Premier League: 2021–22
- President's Cup: 2019
