= Jamal Deen Haruna =

Ghanaian professional footballer

Jamal Haruna
Personal information
- Full name: Jamal Deen Haruna
- Date of birth: 23 October 1999 (age 27)
- Place of birth: Ghana
- Height: 1.86 m (6 ft 1 in)
- Position: Centre-back

Team information
- Current team: Sogndal
- Number: 14

Youth career
- Tudu Mighty Jets

Senior career*
Years	Team	Apps	(Gls)
2018–2019	Wa All Stars	3	(0)
2019–2023	Accra Great Olympics	50	(0)
2023–2024	Raufoss	39	(1)
2024–	Sogndal	27	(0)
2024-2025	→ Raufoss (loan)	16	(1)
2025	Sogndal 2 (loan)	1	(0)
2025	→ Skeid (loan)	5	(0)
2026	→ Sandnes Ulf (loan)	11	(0)
- * Club domestic league appearances and goals as of 14 November 2026

Jamal Deen Haruna (born 23 October 1999) is a Ghanaian professional footballer who plays as a centre-back for Norwegian First Division side, Sogndal.

== Career ==
=== Time in Ghana ===
Haruna started his career at Tudu Mighty Jets' academy. Later, Haruna played for then Wa All Stars now Legon Cities FC. In 2019. he moved to Accra Great Olympics. He played 12 league matches in the 2019–20 Ghana Premier League season before the league was put on hold and later cancelled due to the COVID-19 pandemic.

=== Raufoss ===
In early 2023, after a week-long trial spell, Haruna was signed by Norwegian side Raufoss, on a two-year contract.

=== Sogndal ===
After a year-and-a-half at Raufoss, Haruna was signed by fellow Norwegian First Division side Sogndal. The deal included a loan back to Raufoss for the rest of the 2024 season, before Haruna would join up with the rest of the Sogndal squad before the start of the 2025 season.

In August 2025, after thirteen league games for Sogndal, Haruna was once again loaned out, this time to struggling Skeid, on a loan that ran through the rest of the season.

== International career ==
In early 2021, Haruna was picked as one of several Accra Great Olympics players to train with the Ghana national team ahead of their 2021 Africa Cup of Nations qualification games against São Tomé and Príncipe and South Africa, although he ultimately did not play either of the games.

== Career statistics ==
As of 7 July 2026

Appearances and goals by club, season and competition
Club	Season	League			National Cup		Total	
Club	Season	Division	Apps	Goals	Apps	Goals	Apps	Goals
Raufoss	2023	1. divisjon	27	1	4	1	31	2
Raufoss	2024	1. divisjon	12	0	3	0	15	0
Raufoss	Total		39	1	7	1	46	2
Raufoss (loan)	2024	1. divisjon	16	1	0	0	16	1
Sogndal	2025	1. divisjon	13	0	4	0	17	0
Sogndal 2	2025	4. divisjon	1	0	—		1	0
Skeid (loan)	2025	1. divisjon	5	0	0	0	5	0
Sandnes Ulf (loan)	2026	1. divisjon	11	0	0	0	11	0
Career total			85	2	11	1	96	3
