= Attram De Visser Soccer Academy =

Football team in Ghana

Attram De Visser Soccer Academy (ADVSA)
- Full name: Attram De Visser Soccer Academy
- Founded: 21 June 2010; 16 years ago
- Ground: ADVSA Park; Sowutuom, Greater Accra Region, Ghana
- Capacity: 1,000
- Coordinates: 6°2′07″N 0°33′02″E
- Owner(s): Godwin Attram & Piet de Visser
- Manager: Godwin Attram
- League: Ghana Division Two League
- Website: https://www.attramdevisseracademy.com/
Home colours	Away colours

Attram De Visser Soccer Academy (ADVSA) is a Ghanaian professional football club based near Sowutuom in the Greater Accra Region that was founded by Ghanaian international footballer Godwin Attram and Dutch coach Piet de Visser. They compete in the Division Two League and the MTN FA Cup.

== History ==
In the early 2010s retired Ghanaian international footballer Godwin Attram and Dutch coach and scout Piet de Visser, who is best known for scouting Brazilian football Legend Ronaldo and bringing him to PSV and then Manchester City star Kevin De Bruyne, came up with plans to start a soccer academy in Ghana, to serve both Ghana and West Africa. The vision of the two was to set up a soccer academy to create future opportunities for underprivileged children within the Greater Accra Metropolitan area. With that vision and idea the club was officially established on 21 June 2010.

The ADVSA's aim was started to help young talented African footballers work on their football skills, whilst helping them nurture their football potential the children are helped to acquire formal education which was funded by club. The club is based in Sowutuom, Accra in the Greater Accra Region.

In January 2017, ahead of the 2017-2018 Ghana premier league season, 10 players within the youth ranks of the club were loaned to Ghana Premier League club Accra Great Olympics. The players included Ghanaian international footballer Christopher Nakai Nettey who signed for signed for Asante Kotoko in December 2019 and currently plays for the Kumasi-Based club.

In September 2019, ADVSA won the Greater Accra Regional Football Association (RFA) Special Competition, special competition organized by the Greater Accra FA Association for Division 2 clubs within their region to revive domestic football until the re-organization of the GFA, after the 2018 league season was abandoned, due to the scandals and dissolution of the GFA in June 2018.

In October 2020, Major League Soccer outfit Los Angeles Football Club announced the signing of 19 year old Ghanaian youth international prospect Kwadwo “Mahala” Opoku from ADVSA.

== Partnerships ==
- (Ghana) Accra Great Olympics F.C.
- (Germany) FC Schalke 04
- (United States) Los Angeles FC
- (Netherlands) PSV Eindhoven
- (Netherlands) Willem II

== Honours ==
=== National Titles ===
- Greater Accra Regional Football Association (RFA) Special Competition: 1

2018 ccp

== Notable players ==
For details see Category:Attram De Visser Soccer Academy players.

== Managerial history ==
- (Ghana) Godwin Attram (2010–)

== See also ==
- Godwin Attram
- Piet de Visser
