= Olivier Biaggi =

Swiss footballer (born 1971)

Personal information
- Date of birth: 17 March 1971 (age 55)
- Position: Midfielder

Senior career*
Years	Team	Apps	(Gls)
1989–1993	FC Sion		
1993–1996	FC Lausanne-Sport		
1996	Servette FC		
1996–1999	FC Sion		
1999–2000	Yverdon Sport FC		
2000–2002	FC Lugano		
2002	FC Sion		
2003	FC Luzern		
- * Club domestic league appearances and goals

Olivier Biaggi (born 17 March 1971) is a retired Swiss football midfielder.

== Honours ==
=== Player ===
FC Sion

- Swiss Championship: 1991–92, 1996–97
- Swiss Cup: 1996–97
