= Ali Ibrahim Pelé =

Ghanaian footballer

Ali Ibrahim
Personal information
- Full name: Ali Ibrahim
- Date of birth: 1 September 1969 (age 57)
- Place of birth: Accra, Ghana
- Height: 1.80 m (5 ft 11 in)
- Position: Striker

Senior career*
Years	Team	Apps	(Gls)
1989–1990	Great Olympics	10	(8)
1990–1994	SG Wattenscheid 09	53	(5)
1994–1995	FC Winterthur	23	(8)
1995–1996	Grasshoppers	24	(6)
1996–1998	De Graafschap	42	(8)
1998	K.R.C. Zuid-West-Vlaanderen	12	(0)
1998–2000	Gaziantepspor	29	(8)
2000–2001	SC Paderborn 07	5	(0)
2001–2003	Caracas FC		
2003–2005	SV Babberich		
2005–2006	DSC Zevenaar		

International career
1992–1993	Ghana	7	(0)
- * Club domestic league appearances and goals

Ali Ibrahim (born 1 September 1969), known as Ali Ibrahim Pelé, is a former Ghanaian footballer. He played mainly as a striker, but also appeared as a midfielder.

== Club career ==
Ibrahim started his football career at hometown club Great Olympics before moving to Germany in 1990 to join Bundesliga newcomers SG Wattenscheid 09, staying the four seasons that the club played in the top flight. After relegation, he moved to Swiss club FC Winterthur and Grasshoppers one season later, winning the 1995–96 Nationalliga A.

In 1996, he switched countries again, this time to Dutch club De Graafschap, staying for two seasons. In Netherlands, he gained notoriety after hitting the crossbar when trying a rabona scorpion kick in a match against Ajax. He left the club in 1998 and had a period as a journeyman playing in Belgium for K.R.C. Zuid-West-Vlaanderen, Gaziantepspor in Turkey, returning to Germany at SC Paderborn 07 and Venezuelan Caracas FC. After his spell in South America, he then returned to Netherlands where he finished his career at amateur football clubs SV Babberich and DSC Zevenaar.

== International career ==
Ibrahim was first called to the Ghana national football team in 1991, but only debuting one year later. He was part of the Ghanaian squad that finished as runners-up in the 1992 African Cup of Nations.
