= Hamza Zakari (politician) =

Nigerian politician

Hamza Zakari is a Nigerian politician who represented the Kabo/Gwarzo Federal constituency in the Kano State House of Assembly from 1990 to 2003 and 2003 to 2007 as a member of the All Nigeria Peoples Party (ANPP).
