= Abdellah Boudouma =

Moroccan footballer

Personal information
- Full name: Eric Abdellah Boudouma
- Date of birth: 24 June 1972 (age 54)
- Place of birth: Morocco
- Positions: Midfielder; winger; forward

Senior career*
Years	Team	Apps	(Gls)
- COD Meknès
	Olympique de Marseille	0	(0)
1994/95-1995/96	FC Luzern	1	(0)
1995/1996	SR Delémont	12	(3)
1996-1998	FC Winterthur		
1998/1999	SC Pfullendorf	8	(1)
1999/00-2001	Associazione Dilettantistica Calcio Eclisse CareniPievigina		
2001-2002	A.S. Cittadella	22	(2)
2002/2003	S.S. Teramo Calcio	12	(1)
- * Club domestic league appearances and goals

Eric Abdellah Boudouma (born 24 June 1972 in Morocco) is a Moroccan retired footballer.

== Career ==
Raised in France where he studied law, Boudouma started his senior career with COD Meknès in Morocco, where he was sent by his parents.

After playing for Olympique de Marseille, one of the most successful clubs in France, Boudouma played in Switzerland and Germany, until his father died of hepatitis C aged 67. As a result, Boudouma stopped playing football for six months and chose to restart his life in Italy, where he joined Associazione Dilettantistica Calcio Eclisse CareniPievigina in the fourth division.

From 2001 to 2002, Boudouma played for A.S. Cittadella in the Serie B, the Italian second division, before becoming a coach.
