= Hamza Zakari (footballer) =

Ghanaian footballer

Personal information
- Date of birth: 4 July 1994 (age 32)
- Place of birth: Ghana
- Position: Midfielder

Team information
- Current team: Great Olympics

Youth career
- Aspire Academy

Senior career*
Years	Team	Apps	(Gls)
2012–2013	Eupen	1	(0)
2013	→ Tromsø (loan)	0	(0)
2014–2016	Selfoss	8	(0)
2016–2017	Elche B	6	(1)
2019–	Great Olympics		
- * Club domestic league appearances and goals as of 00:35, 23 March 2020 (UTC)

Hamza Zakari (born 4 July 1994) is a Ghanaian professional football midfielder who plays for Great Olympics.

== Career ==
Zakari played a match in 2013–14 UEFA Europa League: with Tromsø, he was on the pitch in the 0–1 loss against Anzhi Makhachkala. He played 9 matches for Icelandic side Selfoss.
