= Samuel Abbey-Ashie Quaye =

Ghanaian footballer

Samuel Abbey-Ashie Quaye (born 14 April 2001) is a Ghanaian professional footballer who plays as a left-back for Ghanaian Premier league side Accra Great Olympics.

== Career ==
Quaye had been instrumental for Accra Great Olympics in the 2020–21 Ghana Premier League Season, providing an assist for his brother Maxwell Quaye to score a goal against Accra Hearts of Oak, to earn Olympics a 2–0 win.
