= Josephus Yenay =

Liberian footballer (born 1975)

Personal information
- Date of birth: 5 September 1975 (age 51)
- Place of birth: Liberia
- Position: Striker

Senior career*
Years	Team	Apps	(Gls)
1993–1995	Yverdon-Sport	36	(14)
1995–1996	Sion	7	(1)
1996–1997	Luzern	13	(4)
1997–1998	Sion	6	(0)
1998	Fluminense	2	(0)
1998–1999	Naval 1º de Maio	8	(3)
1999	Oulun Tervarit	5	(2)
1999–2000	SV Meppen	14	(7)
2000–2001	Eintracht Braunschweig	17	(1)
2001–2002	Eintracht Trier	12	(2)
2002–2003	União Madeira	12	(2)

International career
2001–2002	Liberia	2	(0)
- * Club domestic league appearances and goals

Josephus Yenay (born 5 September 1975) is a Liberian former professional footballer who played as a striker.

== Club career ==
Yenay had a spell with Associação Naval 1º de Maio in the Portuguese Liga de Honra.

== International career ==
Yenay made two appearances for the Liberia national team. He was selected for the Liberia squad at the 2002 African Cup of Nations and made one appearance in the final tournament.
