= Godfried Aduobe =

Ghanaian footballer (born 1975)

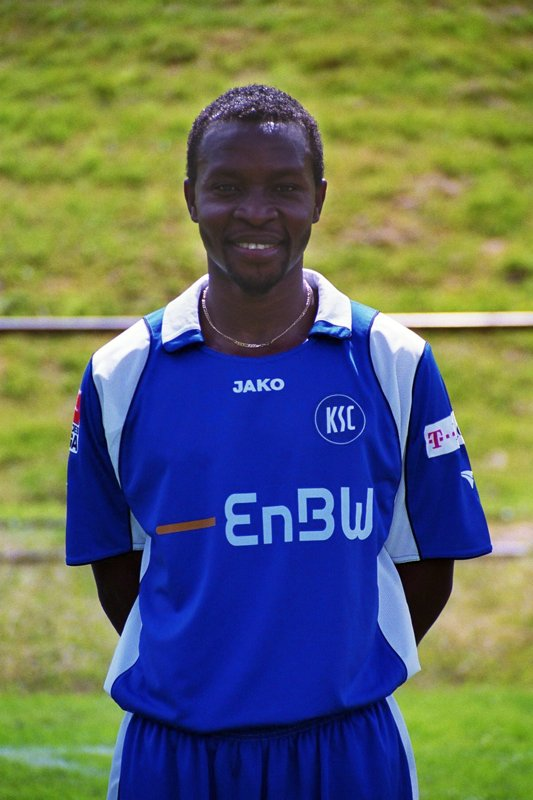

Personal information
- Date of birth: 29 October 1975 (age 51)
- Place of birth: Accra, Ghana
- Height: 1.78 m (5 ft 10 in)
- Position: Midfielder

Youth career
- 1985–1993: Powerlines Accra
- 1993: Torino Calcio

Senior career*
Years	Team	Apps	(Gls)
1993–1994	BSC Old Boys	13	(2)
1994–1996	Young Boys Bern	39	(6)
1996–1998	Greuther Fürth	35	(4)
1998–2002	SSV Reutlingen	129	(7)
2002–2005	Hansa Rostock	45	(1)
2005–2011	Karlsruher SC	162	(2)

International career^{‡}
2003	Ghana	2	(0)
- * Club domestic league appearances and goals as of 2 June 2011 ‡ National team caps and goals as of 25 October 2006

Godfried Aduobe (born 29 October 1975) is a former Ghanaian football midfielder.

== Playing career ==
Aduobe started to play football in his hometown of Accra in Ghana. He moved to Europe by joining the Italian youth club Torino Calcio in 1993, before signing for the Swiss club BSC Old Boys the same year and going on to make 13 appearances for them in the second division. In 1994, he joined another Swiss club, BSC Young Boys, where he spent the next two seasons and made a total of 39 appearances in the Super League.

In 1996, he moved to Germany and went on to spend the remaining 15 years of his playing career in the country. He first played for Greuther Fürth in the third division and helped the club clinch promotion to the 2. Bundesliga for the 1997–98 season. In 1998, he moved back to the third tier of German football by joining SSV Reutlingen. He was a regular at the club over the next four seasons. In his first two seasons with SSV Reutlingen, he made a total of 63 appearances in the third division. He helped the club get promoted to the 2. Bundesliga at the end of his second season there, which allowed him to return to playing in the second division in 2000–01. In his third and fourth seasons with SSV Reutlingen, he only missed two of the club's 68 matches in the 2. Bundesliga.

In 2002, Aduobe joined Bundesliga side Hansa Rostock, where he spent his first season as a regular and made a total of 29 appearances in the top flight. However, he lost his place in the starting line-up after that and was only able to add 16 Bundesliga appearances to his tally over the following season and a half, before moving back to the 2. Bundesliga by joining Karlsruher SC midway through the 2004–05 season in January 2005.

Aduobe went on to spend the remaining six and a half seasons of his playing career with the club. Until the end of the 2004–05 season in the 2. Bundesliga, he scored two goals in 13 appearances and helped Karlsruher SC avoid relegation. Their fortunes improved in the following two seasons, with Aduobe becoming one of the key players and appearing in 30 of the club's 34 league matches, all in the starting line-up, in each of the two seasons. After barely missing promotion to the Bundesliga by finishing in 6th place in 2005–06, Karlsruher SC won the 2. Bundesliga in 2006–07 and secured itself a spot in the top flight for 2007–08. During the club's two seasons in the Bundesliga, Aduobe appeared in 46 out of 68 matches.

Following their relegation back to the 2. Bundesliga in 2009, he spent a further two seasons with Karlsruher SC. Although he began struggling with injuries in 2010, he was still able to appear in 43 of the club's 68 league matches during the two seasons, and make the final appearance of his career on 15 May 2011 in a 3–2 win at home to Union Berlin that allowed Karlsruher SC to avoid relegation to the third division in their final 2. Bundesliga match of the 2010–11 season.
