= Claudio Taddei =

Uruguayan-Swiss singer-songwriter and painter (1966–2019)

- Born: 22 December 1966; Minas, Uruguay
- Died: 9 August 2019 (aged 52); Lugano, Switzerland
- Occupations: Singer-songwriter, painter

Claudio Taddei (22 December 1966 – 9 August 2019) was a Uruguayan-Swiss singer-songwriter and painter.
