= Urs Isler =

Swiss footballer (born 1965)

Personal information
- Date of birth: 10 June 1965 (age 61)

Senior career*
Years	Team	Apps	(Gls)
1987–1990	FC Winterthur		
1990–1992	FC Baden		
1992–1993	FC Zürich		
1993–1994	FC Baden		
1994–1995	FC Zürich		
- * Club domestic league appearances and goals

Urs Isler (born 10 June 1965) is a retired Swiss football player.
