= Gladson Awako =

Ghanaian footballer (born 1990)

Personal information
- Full name: Gladson Awako
- Date of birth: December 31, 1990 (age 35)
- Place of birth: Akame, Volta Region, Ghana
- Height: 1.67 m (5 ft 5 1/2 in)
- Position: Midfielder

Team information
- Current team: Accra Great Olympics
- Number: 7

Youth career
- Berekum Arsenal

Senior career*
Years	Team	Apps	(Gls)
2006–2008	All Stars	30	(11)
2008–2010	Heart of Lions	34	(13)
2008	→ Real Sportive (loan)	37	(9)
2010	Recreativo de Huelva	0	(0)
2010–2011	Heart of Lions	0	(0)
2011–2012	Berekum Chelsea	7	(0)
2012–2017	TP Mazembe	90	(13)
2017–2018	Phoenix Rising	46	(2)
2019–	Accra Great Olympics	41	(9)

International career^{‡}
2009	Ghana U-20		
2009–	Ghana	8	(1)
- * Club domestic league appearances and goals as of 8 July 2021 ‡ National team caps and goals as of 8 March 2023

Gladson Awako (born December 31, 1990) is a Ghanaian footballer who plays as a midfielder and captains Accra Hearts of Oaks.

== Career ==
=== Early career ===
Awako began his career with Berekum Arsenal and joined in 2006 to All Stars F.C. who played his first profi matches in the Ghana Premier League. On 11 March 2008 was scouted from Heart of Lions and left also after two years All Stars F.C. He played than from May 2008 a half year on loan from Heart of Lions for Real Sportive between October 2008 on loan for Real Sportive before turned back to Heart of Lions.

On 29 April 2009 the 19-year-old Ghanaian U-20 National Team player by Heart of Lions completed a trial training at Tottenham Hotspur F.C. and was eyeing from Internazionale, and A.C. Chievo in Italy.

=== Recreativo de Huelva ===
On 17 February 2010 the Segunda División club Recreativo de Huelva signed him, but he couldn't play for the first team or the "B" squad until summer 2010. After a half year, he returned to his former club Heart of Lions. On 10 June 2011, he moved to the fellow league club Berekum Chelsea.

=== TP Mazembe ===
On 17 October 2012 Awako joined Congolese giants TP Mazembe on a five-year contract.

At the end of November 2019, Awako move returned to Ghana and joined Accra Great Olympics.

== International career ==
Awako is member of the Ghana national under-20 football team at 2009 African Youth Championship in Rwanda and won with the team the tournament. He was called up for the Black Stars for a friendly game against Argentina national football team and made in the game on 1 October 2009 his debut.

=== International goals ===
Scores and results list Ghana's goal tally first.

No.	Date	Venue	Opponent	Score	Result	Competition
1.	24 July 2022	Cape Coast Sports Stadium, Cape Coast, Ghana	Benin	3–0	3–0	2022 African Nations Championship qualification

== Style of play ==
Awako is a midfielder and playmaker. He previously played as a fullback.

== Honours ==
Berekum Chelsea

- President's Cup: 2012

TP Mazembe

- DR Congo Championship : 2013, 2013–14, 2015–16
- DR Congo Super Cup : 2013, 2014, 2016
- CAF Champions League : 2015
- Confederation Cup : 2016, runner up: 2013
- CAF Super Cup : 2016

Hearts of Oak

- President's Cup: 2022
- Ghanaian FA Cup: 2022

Ghana U20

- 2009 African Youth Championship
- 2009 FIFA U-20 World Cup
