= Jürg Studer =

Swiss footballer (born 1966)

Jörg Studer
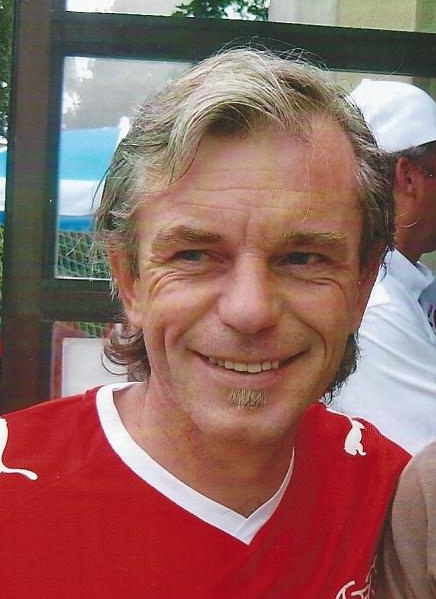
- Jörg Studer

Personal information
- Date of birth: 8 September 1966 (age 60)
- Place of birth: Rüttenen, Switzerland
- Height: 1.70 m (5 ft 7 in)
- Position: Midfielder

Senior career*
Years	Team	Apps	(Gls)
1986–1989	FC Zürich		
1989–1990	FC Aarau	16	(0)
1990–1993	Lausanne Sport	58	(4)
1993–1997	FC Zürich	70	(3)
1997–1999	Young Boys	21	(2)
1999–2001	FC Solothurn		

International career
1992–1994	Switzerland	6	(0)
- * Club domestic league appearances and goals

Jürg Studer (born 8 September 1966) is a Swiss former professional footballer who played as a midfielder.

He earned six caps for the Swiss national team and was in the Swiss squad at the 1994 FIFA World Cup.
