= Jörg Stiel =

Swiss footballer and coach (born 1968)

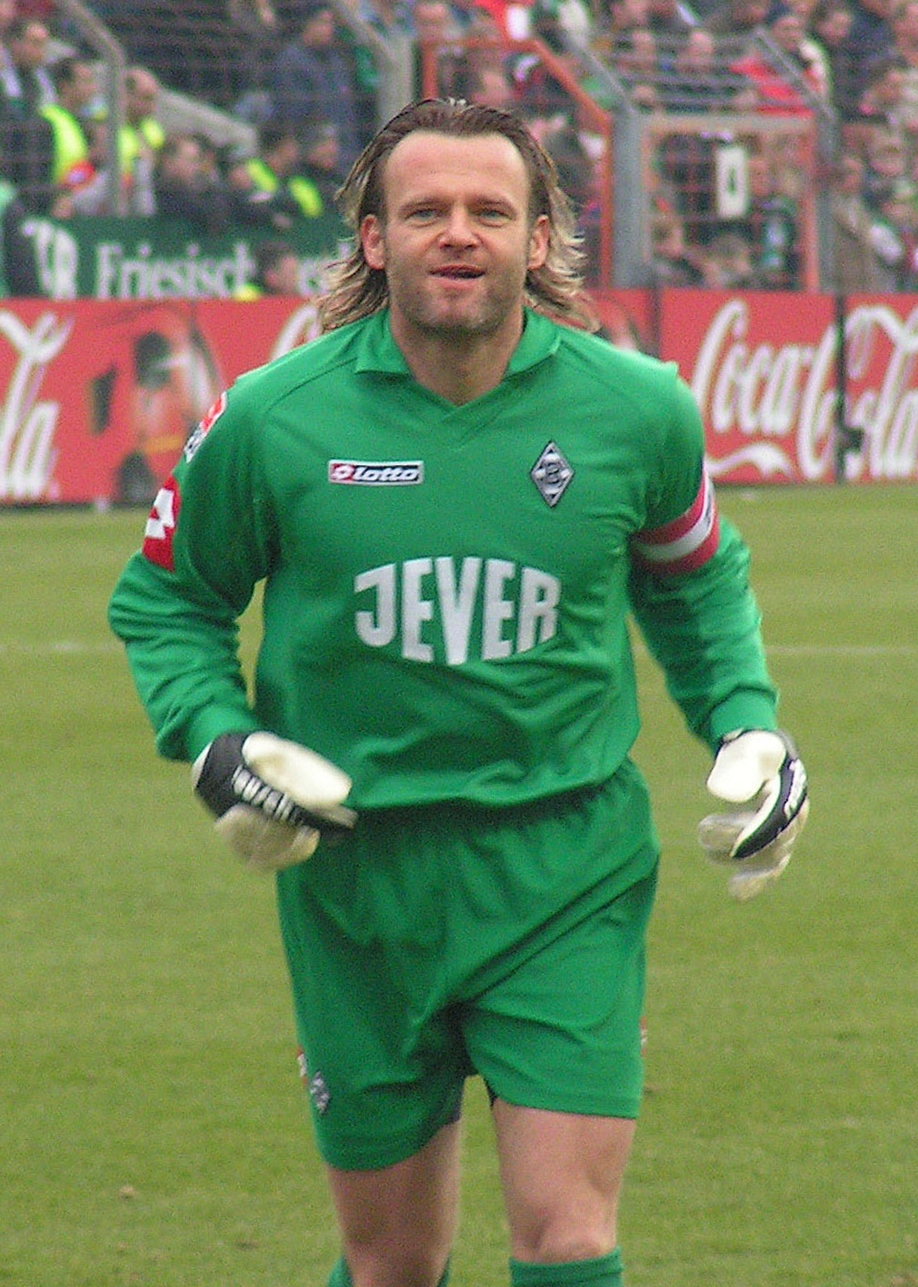
- Stiel with Borussia Mönchengladbach

Personal information
- Date of birth: 3 March 1968 (age 58)
- Place of birth: Baden, Switzerland
- Height: 1.80 m (5 ft 11 in)
- Position: Goalkeeper

Team information
- Current team: Beijing Guoan (goalkeeping coach)

Senior career*
Years	Team	Apps	(Gls)
1986–1990	Wettingen	96	(0)
1990–1993	St. Gallen	108	(0)
1993–1994	Toros Neza	35	(0)
1994–1996	Zürich	69	(0)
1996–2001	St. Gallen	161	(0)
2001–2004	Borussia Mönchengladbach	89	(0)
Total		558	(0)

International career
2000–2004	Switzerland	21	(0)

Managerial career
- 2021–2025: Grasshoppers (goalkeeping)
- 2026–: Beijing Guoan (goalkeeping)
- * Club domestic league appearances and goals

Jörg Stiel (born 3 March 1968) is a Swiss former professional footballer who played as a goalkeeper. He is the goalkeeing coach of Chinese Super League club Beijing Guoan.

He appeared in 409 Swiss Super League games during 14 seasons, representing in the competition Wettingen, St. Gallen and Zürich. Over an 18-year professional career, he also played in Germany with Borussia Mönchengladbach. Stiel was also part of the Swiss squad at Euro 2004.

== Club career ==
Born in Baden, Stiel started his career with FC Wettingen, later playing for FC St. Gallen and FC Zürich in his native country. He also spent a season with Mexican club Toros Neza, before returning to St. Gallen in 1996.

For 2001–02, Stiel was signed by Borussia Mönchengladbach in the Bundesliga. He was the undisputed starter throughout his three-season stint in Germany, featuring in 96 matches all competitions comprised and relegating legendary Uwe Kamps to the substitutes bench.

== International career ==
Stiel won 21 caps for Switzerland during three-and-a-half years, and was the country's first-choice at UEFA Euro 2004, appearing in all three group games in Portugal. In the 0–3 loss against England, one of the goals came after deflecting from the post onto the back of his head, although it was officially credited to Wayne Rooney.

After the tournament, where he was also named Man of the match in the 0–0 draw with Croatia, Stiel retired from playing altogether.

== Coaching career ==
In November 2006, Stiel joined Austrian side SC Rheindorf Altach as goalkeeping coach. On 19 July 2009, he returned to Borussia in the same capacity.

Stiel returned to his country in the summer of 2014, going on to work with FC Basel's youths as a goalkeeper coach.

In June 2021, he became the goalkeeper coach of Grasshopper Club Zürich. On 12 May 2025, he was relieved of his duties at Grasshoppers, just weeks before he was set to depart the club anyway.

On 19 July 2026, Stiel was named as the goalkeeping coach of Chinese Super League club Beijing Guoan.
