= Alain Baumann =

Swiss footballer (born 1966)

Personal information
- Date of birth: 12 March 1966 (age 60)
- Place of birth: Köniz
- Position: Midfielder

Senior career*
Years	Team	Apps	(Gls)
1985–1999	BSC Young Boys		
1999–2001	FC Thun		
- * Club domestic league appearances and goals

Alain Baumann (born 12 March 1966) is a retired Swiss football midfielder.

== Honours ==
- Swiss Super League:
  - Winner: 1985–86
- Swiss Super Cup:
  - Winner: 1986
- Swiss Cup:
  - Winner: 1986–87
