= Peter Gmür =

Swiss footballer (born 1967)

Personal information
- Date of birth: 15 May 1967 (age 59)
- Position: Defender

Senior career*
Years	Team	Apps	(Gls)
1987–1998	FC Luzern		
- * Club domestic league appearances and goals

Peter Gmür (born 15 May 1967) is a retired Swiss football defender.
