= Roger Walker (footballer) =

English footballer

Personal information
- Full name: Roger Anthony Walker
- Date of birth: 15 November 1966 (age 59)
- Place of birth: Bolton, England
- Position: Winger

Youth career
- 1982–1984: Bolton Wanderers

Senior career*
Years	Team	Apps	(Gls)
1984–1986	Bolton Wanderers	12	(1)
1986	IF Friska Viljor	?	(?)
1986–1987	Gillingham	0	(0)
1987–1991	Sliema Wanderers	55	(18)
1991–1992	FC Bern 1894	?	(?)
1992–1994	FC Baden	?	(?)
1994–1997	FC Zürich	39	(1)
1997–2001	Hibernians	76	(7)
2001–2002	Sliema Wanderers	16	(2)
2002–2004	Marsaxlokk	37	(2)
Total		235	(31)
- * Club domestic league appearances and goals

Roger Anthony Walker (born 15 November 1966) is an English former professional footballer who played as a winger.

== Playing career ==
Born in Bolton, Walker began his career with Bolton Wanderers, making 12 appearances in the Football League between 1984 and 1986. Later he played for Swedish team IF Friska Viljor, before returning to England at Gillingham, where he spent a year without making a League appearance.

Walker later spent time in Switzerland, playing for FC Bern 1894, FC Baden and FC Zürich between 1991 and 1997. He also played in Malta for a number of teams including Sliema Wanderers, Hibernians and Marsaxlokk.

== Coaching career ==
In June 2022, Walker, having remained in Malta, was appointed as assistant coach and youth team coach at Mellieħa.

== Personal life ==
Walker's son Jacob has also played professional football, representing Malta at under-21 level and has followed in his father's footsteps by playing for Marsaxlokk.
