= Giuseppe Mazzarelli =

Swiss footballer (born 1972)

Personal information
- Date of birth: 14 August 1972 (age 54)
- Place of birth: Uster, Switzerland
- Height: 1.80 m (5 ft 11 in)
- Position: Defender

Senior career*
| Years | Team | Apps | (Gls) |
| 1990–1995 | Zürich | 118 | (8) |
| 1996 | Manchester City (loan) | 2 | (0) |
| 1996–1997 | Zürich | 29 | (1) |
| 1997–1999 | Grasshoppers | 43 | (1) |
| 1999–2000 | St. Gallen | 36 | (3) |
| 2001–2003 | Bari | 61 | (4) |
| 2004–2005 | Baden | 9 | (0) |
| Total | | 298 | (17) |

International career
| 1994–2002 | Switzerland | 13 | (1) |
- * Club domestic league appearances and goals

Giuseppe Mazzarelli (born 14 August 1972) is a former Swiss footballer who played as a defender.

During his career he played for FC Zürich, Manchester City F.C., Grasshopper Club Zürich, FC St. Gallen, A.S. Bari and FC Baden. He earned 12 caps for the Switzerland national football team.
