= Urs Güntensperger =

Swiss footballer (born 1967)

Personal information
- Full name: Urs Güntensperger
- Date of birth: 24 November 1967 (age 58)
- Place of birth: Switzerland
- Height: 1.75 m (5 ft 9 in)
- Position: Striker

Youth career
- –1987: FC Albisrieden

Senior career*
Years	Team	Apps	(Gls)
1987–1988	FC Albisrieden		
1988–1990	FC Winterthur	60	(25)
1990–1991	FC Lugano	32	(6)
1992–1995	FC Luzern	77	(28)
1995–1996	FC Zürich	33	(12)
1996–1998	Eintracht Frankfurt	44	(11)
1999	Lausanne Sports	2	(0)
1999–2000	FC Basel	6	(0)
2000	FC Tuggen		
2000	FC Horgen		
2001	Red Star Zürich		
2001	BSC Zürich		
2003–06	FC Reinach		

International career
	Swiss U-21	3	(0)

Managerial career
- 2004–06: FC Reinach
- 2006–07: FC Bubendorf
- * Club domestic league appearances and goals

Urs Güntensperger (born 24 November 1967) is a retired Swiss football striker.

== Playing career ==
Güntensperger played his youth football with local amateur club FC Albisrieden and advanced to their first team during the 1987–88 season.

Güntensperger signed for FC Winterthur in 1988, who at this time played in the second tier of Swiss football, then in 2000 he signed for Lugano who played in the top tier. During this period Güntensperger had three appearances in the Swiss national U-21 team. Due to a car accident, during the 1991–92 season Güntensperger was injured and was not with a football club. In 1992 he signed for FC Luzern and with Luzern, Güntensperger achieved promotion from the second to the top tier, where he played for a further three seasons. In the summer 1996 he moved to FC Zürich and one year later to Eintracht Frankfurt in Germany. Two years later he returned to Switzerland and signed for Lausanne Sports.

Güntensperger joined FC Basel's first team during their 1998–99 season under head-coach Guy Mathez. He played his domestic league debut for the club in the home game in the Stadion Schützenmatte on 19 April 1999 as Basel played a 3–3 draw against St. Gallen. In the following season, Güntensperger played another few games for the club before retiring from professional football. During his short period with the club, Güntensperger played a total of nine games for Basel without scoring a goal. Six of these games were in the Nationalliga A, one in the Swiss Cup and two were friendly games.

Güntensperger then played for amateur clubs FC Tuggen, FC Horgen, Red Star Zürich and BSC Zürich.

== Coaching career ==
Working as a player-coach. Güntensperger's first job was for FC Reinach (BL) and he commenced this engagement in the summer of 2003. For the 2006–07 season he moved to FC Bubendorf, however, in February 2007 he surprisingly resigned and the reasons remain unclear.

== Sources ==
- Rotblau: Jahrbuch Saison 2017/2018. Publisher: FC Basel Marketing AG. ISBN 978-3-7245-2189-1
- Die ersten 125 Jahre. Publisher: Josef Zindel im Friedrich Reinhardt Verlag, Basel. ISBN 978-3-7245-2305-5
- Verein "Basler Fussballarchiv" Homepage
