= Rachid Neqrouz =

Moroccan footballer

Personal information
- Full name: Rachid Neqrouz
- Date of birth: 10 April 1972 (age 54)
- Place of birth: Ksar es Souk, Morocco
- Height: 1.89 m (6 ft 2 1/2 in)
- Position: Centre back

Senior career*
Years	Team	Apps	(Gls)
1993–1994	Mouloudia Oujda		
1994–1997	Young Boys	100	(7)
1997–2003	Bari	159	(6)

International career
1994–2000	Morocco	52	(3)
- * Club domestic league appearances and goals as of April 18, 2007

Rachid Neqrouz (Arabic: راشد نقروز) (born 10 April 1972) is a former Moroccan former football defender, who played for Young Boys Bern in Switzerland and A.S. Bari in Italy. He retired in 2003, after being released for free by Bari.

== Career ==
Neqrouz made over 100 appearances in Serie A for Bari.

He played for the Morocco national football team and was a participant at the 1994 FIFA World Cup and at the 1998 FIFA World Cup.
