= Peter Møller =

Danish footballer and sports journalist (born 1972)

- Møller in 2004

Personal information
- Full name: Peter Møller Nielsen
- Date of birth: 23 March 1972 (age 54)
- Place of birth: Abildgård, Frederikshavn, Denmark
- Height: 1.90 m (6 ft 3 in)
- Position: Striker

Team information
- Current team: HIK (youth coach)

Youth career
- –1980: LKB Gistrup
- 1980–1990: AaB

Senior career*
Years	Team	Apps	(Gls)
1990–1993	AaB	81	(46)
1993–1995	Copenhagen	30	(8)
1994–1995	→ FC Zürich (loan)	26	(9)
1995–1997	Brøndby	69	(42)
1997–1998	PSV	22	(6)
1998–2001	Real Oviedo	38	(3)
2000	→ Brøndby (loan)	7	(3)
2001	→ Fulham (loan)	5	(1)
2001–2005	Copenhagen	124	(36)
Total		402	(154)

International career
1990	Denmark U19	1	(0)
1990–1993	Denmark U21	22	(16)
1991–2005	Denmark	20	(5)

Managerial career
- 2018–: HIK (youth coach)
- * Club domestic league appearances and goals

Peter Møller Nielsen (Danish pronunciation: [ˈpʰe̝ˀtɐ ˈmølˀɐ ˈne̝lsn̩]; born 23 March 1972) is a Danish former professional footballer, sports journalist, and football coach.

As a player, Møller won four Danish Superliga championships for the rival clubs Brøndby IF and F.C. Copenhagen, and became the most scoring Superliga player ever in 2005. He scored five goals in 20 matches for the Denmark national football team, and took part in the 1998 FIFA World Cup.

In 2018, Møller became sporting director of the Danish Football Association. He is currently working as a youth coach at HIK.

== Biography ==
Born in part of Frederikshavn called Abildgård, Møller played with local team Aalborg Boldspilklub (AaB). He got his breakthrough in the top-flight Danish championship, when he was handed his debut by AaB manager Poul Erik Andreasen in 1990. He was called up for the Danish under-21 national team in November 1990, and went on to score 16 goals in 22 games for the under-21 national team, including games at the 1992 Summer Olympics. He made his Denmark national team debut in September 1991, under national manager Richard Møller Nielsen, but would spend the following years mainly as a substitute.

He was AaB's leading goal scorer in his four seasons at the club, and was the Superliga top scorer two consecutive seasons in the 1991–92 and 1992–93 seasons. Møller was chased by both Danish top teams F.C. Copenhagen (FCK) and Brøndby IF, and ended up moving to FCK in July 1993. He played a single year at FCK, but struggled to reproduce his goalscoring ability. He was loaned out to Swiss club FC Zürich in August 1994, and when he returned to FCK in June 1995, he looked to leave the club.

He moved to Brøndby IF, where he was Brøndby's league top goalscorer two consecutive seasons, as Brøndby won the 1995–96 Superliga and 1996–97 Superliga championships. After a three-year absence, he was recalled to the Denmark national team in August 1996, by new national manager Bo Johansson. He moved abroad in 1997, when he was sold to Dutch club PSV Eindhoven. He did not find success at PSV, but was included in the Danish squad for the 1998 FIFA World Cup. He played two games at the tournament, and scored a goal against Nigeria.

After the World Cup, he moved on to Real Oviedo in Spain. Not a proven goalscorer for Oviedo either, he had short loan spells at English club Fulham, scoring once against Queens Park Rangers, and back home with Brøndby IF. He was once more dropped from the Denmark national team. In the summer 2001, he moved back to Denmark to once again play for F.C. Copenhagen. With his previous success for FCK's arch rivals Brøndby IF, he was initially scorned by the FCK fans and only referred to by his shirt number, "number 32". He would convert even his harshest critics over time, as he always fought for the team and scored some important goals. He helped FCK win two Superliga titles, as well as the 2004 Danish Cup trophy. After two years away from the national team, Møller was recalled by national manager Morten Olsen in March 2005. He scored two goals in Denmark's 3–0 win against Kazakhstan in the 2006 FIFA World Cup qualification.

Møller ended his active playing career in December 2005. He ended his FCK contract six months early, to become a sports journalist at Danmarks Radio. In 2005, he was elected chairman for the Danish football players' association, a position Møller left in favour of Thomas Lindrup, when ending his active career.

== Career highlights ==
=== Club statistics ===
Total number of goals for Brøndby IF (1995–1997 and 2000):

- In the Danish league: 45 goals
- In the Danish Cup: 4 goals
- In the Danish League Cup: 2 goals
- In the UEFA Cup/Champions League: 11 goals
- Total score in 101 games: 62 goals

=== Honours ===
- Danish Superliga:
  - 1996 and 1997, with Brøndby I.F
  - 2003 and 2004, with FC København
- Danish Cup: 2004
- Royal League: 2005
- Football League Championship: 2000–01 with Fulham
