= Accra Great Olympics F.C. =

Association football club in Accra

Accra Great Olympics
- Full name: Accra Great Olympics Football Club Limited
- Nickname: Oly Dade
- Founded: 1954; 72 years ago
- Ground: Accra Sports Stadium; Accra, Greater Accra, Ghana
- Capacity: 40,000
- Manager: Annor Walker
- League: Ghana Premier League
Home colours	Away colours

Accra Great Olympics is a Ghanaian professional football club based in Accra, Greater Accra. The club is currently competing in the Ghana Premier League. It has won the Ghana Premier League twice, in 1970, 1974 and the Ghana FA Cup thrice, in 1975, 1983 and 1995. Since its inception the club has forged a fierce rivalry between their neighbours Accra Hearts of Oak which has culminated into interesting game weeks over the years when the two face each other.

== History ==
The club was formed in 1954 in Accra, Greater Accra Region of Ghana. It celebrated its 52nd anniversary in 2006, and their 66th in 2020.

=== 2020 ===
The club is currently coached by Annor Walker assisted by Yaw Preko and captained by Ghanaian 2009 U-20 World Cup champion Gladson Awako.

== Grounds ==
The club plays their matches at the Accra Sports Stadium.

== Current squad ==
As of 3 February 2024

Note: Flags indicate national team as defined under FIFA eligibility rules; some limited exceptions apply. Players may hold more than one non-FIFA nationality.

No.	Pos.	Nation	Player
1	GK	GHA	Seidu Ismaila
2	DF	GHA	Mathew Abayase
3	MF	GHA	Isaac Mensah
4	DF	GHA	Samuel Ashie Quaye
7	FW	GHA	Michael Yeboah
9	FW	GHA	Michael Osei
10	MF	GHA	Emmanuel Antwi
11	MF	GHA	Rodney Appiah
12	MF	GHA	Emmanuel Akesseh
13	FW	GHA	Prince Antwi
14	DF	GHA	Raymond Oko Grippman
15	DF	GHA	Richard Botchway
16	GK	GHA	Eugene Adjah Sowah

No.	Pos.	Nation	Player
17	FW	GHA	Michael Kweku Osei
18	DF	GHA	Solomon Adomako
20	MF	GHA	Prince Kwadwo Afrifa
21	DF	GHA	Razak Kasim
23	MF	GHA	Boateng Frimpong
26	DF	GHA	Ebenezer Sekyere
27	DF	GHA	Solomon Twene
28	FW	GHA	Matthew Agama
29	DF	GHA	Christopher Nettey
30	DF	GHA	Kekeli Attor
31	FW	GHA	Abraham Nissi
40	GK	GHA	Benjamin Asare

== Honours ==
- Ghana Premier League
  - Champions 1970, 1974
- Ghanaian FA Cup
  - Winners 1975, 1983, 1995

== Performance in CAF competitions ==
- African Cup of Champions Clubs: 2 appearances

1971: Semi-Final
1975: First Round

- CAF Cup: 1 appearance

1999 – First Round

- CAF Cup Winners' Cup: 4 appearances

1984 – Second Round
1992 – Second Round
1996 – withdrew in First Round
2000 – First Round

== Participation in CAF competitions ==
Year	Tournament	Round	Club	Home	Away	Total
1971	African Cup of Champions Clubs	1	(Kenya) Abaluhya United	3–1	0–0	3–1
1971	African Cup of Champions Clubs	2	(Madagascar) MMM Tamatave	4–0	1–2	5–2
1971	African Cup of Champions Clubs	Quarterfinal	(Uganda) Coffee United SC	2–0	0–0	2–0
1971	African Cup of Champions Clubs	Semi-final	(Ghana) Asante Kotoko	1–1	0–1	1–2
1975	African Cup of Champions Clubs	1	(Nigeria) Enugu Rangers	0–2	1–2	1–4
1984	African Cup Winners’ Cup	1	(Mali) Djoliba AC	0–0	4–0	4–0
1984	African Cup Winners’ Cup	2	(Ivory Coast) ASEC Mimosas	2–1	0–2	2–3
1992	African Cup Winners’ Cup	1	(Liberia) Invincible Eleven	0–1	2–0	2–1
1992	African Cup Winners’ Cup	2	(Zaire) DC Motema Pembe	1–0	2–4	3–4
1996	African Cup Winners’ Cup	1	(Senegal) ASF Douanes	w.o.^{1}		
1999	CAF Cup	1	(Burkina Faso) Etoile Filante	3–2	0–2	3–4
2000	African Cup Winners’ Cup	1	(Libya) Al Ittihad Tripoli	2–0	0–2	2–2 (2–3 p)

1- Great Olympics withdrew

== Managers ==
Annor Walker (head coach) 2020–

Yaw Preko (assistant head coach) 2020–

Godwin Attram (assistant head coach) 2020–2021

=== Previous notable coaches ===
Cecil Jones Attuquayefio (1974–1984)

David Duncan (2001–2003)

Ken Augustt (2011–2012)

Godwin Attram (2017)

Yaw Preko (2020)

== Seasons ==
- 2020–21 Accra Great Olympics F.C. season
