= 1995–96 UEFA Cup =

25th season of Europe's secondary club football tournament organised by UEFA

Tournament details
- Dates: 8 August 1995 – 15 May 1996
- Teams: 98

Final positions
- Champions: (Germany) Bayern Munich (1st title)
- Runners-up: (France) Bordeaux

Tournament statistics
- Matches played: 126
- Goals scored: 330 (2.62 per match)
- Top scorer(s): Jürgen Klinsmann (Bayern Munich); 15 goals
- Statistics are for the competition proper, which does not include the preliminary round.

The 1995–96 UEFA Cup was the 25th season of Europe's then-tertiary club football tournament organised by UEFA. It was won by German club Bayern Munich on aggregate over Bordeaux of France. Girondins de Bordeaux went to the final all the way from the 1995 UEFA Intertoto Cup, its first season, being the only Intertoto Cup entrant to reach this far in the UEFA Cup. With this victory, Bayern became the third club to have won all three major European trophies at the time (European Cup/UEFA Champions League, UEFA Cup/UEFA Europa League, and the Cup Winners' Cup). The finals itself was the only UEFA Cup final during the 1990s to not feature any Italian sides.

The 1995–96 season also saw the return of Yugoslav clubs on the international scene after three years of ban due to UN embargo. However, Yugoslav national champion, Red Star Belgrade, was eliminated as early as in the qualifying round.

== Format ==
According to 1994 UEFA ranking, the Netherlands and Hungary lost a slot, while Israel gained one. Under a UEFA special decision, Czech Republic and Slovakia were still considered as a single country.

The access list was finally increased to 98 clubs:

- the federations with a UEFA place rose from the traditional number of 32 to 36,
- the national champions excluded from the Champions League were 23,
- 4 winners of the new UEFA Intertoto Cup quarter-finals entered into the UEFA Cup,
- 3 clubs of the UEFA Fair Play ranking were added.

== Teams ==
The labels in the parentheses show how each team qualified for the place of its starting round:

- TH: Title holders
- LC: League Cup winners
- Nth: League position
- IC: Intertoto Cup
- FP: Fair play

First round
(Italy) Lazio (2nd)	(Italy) Milan (4th)	(Italy) Roma (5th)	(Italy) Internazionale (6th)
(France) Lyon (2nd)	(France) Auxerre (4th)	(France) Lens (5th)	(France) Monaco (6th)
(Germany) Werder Bremen (2nd)	(Germany) Freiburg (3rd)	(Germany) Kaiserslautern (4th)	(Germany) Bayern Munich (6th)
(Spain) Real Betis (3rd)	(Spain) Barcelona (4th)	(Spain) Sevilla (5th)	(England) Manchester United (2nd)
(England) Nottingham Forest (3rd)	(England) Liverpool (LC)	(Portugal) Benfica (3rd)	(Portugal) Vitória de Guimarães (4th)
(Portugal) Farense (5th)	(Russia) Lokomotiv Moscow (3rd)	(Russia) Rotor Volgograd (4th)	(Russia) Spartak Vladikavkaz (5th)
(Belgium) Standard Liège (2nd)	(Belgium) Eendracht Aalst (4th)	(Belgium) Lierse (5th)	(Netherlands) Roda (2nd)
(Netherlands) PSV Eindhoven (3rd)	(England) Leeds United (FP)		
Preliminary round
(Turkey) Galatasaray (3rd)	(Turkey) Fenerbahçe (4th)	(Austria) Sturm Graz (2nd)	Austria Wien (4th)
(Federal Republic of Yugoslavia) Red Star Belgrade (1st)	(Greece) Olympiacos (2nd)	(Greece) Apollon Smyrnis (4th)	(Denmark) Brøndby (2nd)
(Denmark) Silkeborg (3rd)	(Sweden) Örebro (2nd)	(Sweden) Malmö FF (3rd)	(Scotland) Motherwell (2nd)
(Scotland) Raith Rovers (LC)	(Switzerland) Lugano (2nd)	(Switzerland) Neuchâtel Xamax (3rd)	(Poland) Widzew Łódź (2nd)
(Poland) Zagłębie Lubin (4th)	(Romania) Universitatea Craiova (2nd)	(Romania) Dinamo București (3rd)	(Norway) Lillestrøm (2nd)
(Israel) Hapoel Be'er Sheva (3rd)	(Israel) Hapoel Tel Aviv (4th)	(Hungary) Újpest (2nd)	(Croatia) Osijek (3rd)
(Cyprus) Omonia (2nd)	(Ukraine) Chornomorets Odesa (2nd)	(Georgia (country)) Dinamo Tbilisi (1st)	(Georgia (country)) Samtredia (2nd)
(Iceland) ÍA (1st)	(Iceland) FH (2nd)	(Latvia) Skonto (1st)	(Latvia) RAF Jelgava (2nd)
(Finland) TPV (1st)	(Finland) MyPa (2nd)	(Slovakia) Slovan Bratislava (1st)	(Slovakia) Košice (2nd)
(Slovenia) Olimpija Ljubljana (1st)	(Slovenia) Maribor (2nd)	(Bulgaria) Levski Sofia (1st)	(Bulgaria) Botev Plovdiv (3rd)
(Bulgaria) Slavia Sofia (4th)	(Czech Republic) Sparta Prague (1st)	(Czech Republic) Slavia Prague (2nd)	(Wales) Bangor City (1st)
(Wales) Afan Lido (2nd)	(Northern Ireland) Crusaders (1st)	(Northern Ireland) Glenavon (2nd)	(Republic of Ireland) Dundalk (1st)
(Republic of Ireland) Shelbourne (2nd)	(Belarus) Dinamo Minsk (1st)	(Malta) Hibernians (1st)	(Malta) Sliema Wanderers (2nd)
(Albania) Tirana (1st)	(Albania) Partizani (3rd)	(Lithuania) Inkaras Kaunas (1st)	(Luxembourg) Jeunesse Esch (1st)
(Faroe Islands) GÍ (1st)	(Armenia) Shirak (1st)	(North Macedonia) Vardar (1st)	(Moldova) Zimbru Chișinău (1st)
(Estonia) Flora (1st)	(Azerbaijan) Kapaz (1st)	(France) Bordeaux (IC)	(France) Strasbourg (IC)
(Germany) Karlsruhe (IC)	(Austria) Tirol Innsbruck (IC)	(Norway) Viking (FP)	(Luxembourg) Avenir Beggen (FP)

== Preliminary round ==
Team 1	Agg.	Team 2	1st leg	2nd leg
Omonia (Cyprus)	5–1	(Malta) Sliema Wanderers	3–0	2–1
Sparta Prague (Czech Republic)	4–2	(Turkey) Galatasaray	3–1	1–1
Afan Lido (Wales)	1–2	(Latvia) RAF Jelgava	1–2	0–0
Apollon Smyrnis (Greece)	2–3	(Slovenia) Olimpija Ljubljana	1–0	1–3
Bangor City (Wales)	0–5	(Poland) Widzew Łódź	0–4	0–1
Brøndby (Denmark)	6–0	(Lithuania) Inkaras Kaunas	3–0	3–0
Crusaders (Northern Ireland)	1–6	(Denmark) Silkeborg	1–2	0–4
Dinamo București (Romania)	1–2	(Bulgaria) Levski Sofia	0–1	1–1(aet)
Dundalk (Republic of Ireland)	0–4	(Sweden) Malmö FF	0–2	0–2
Jeunesse Esch (Luxembourg)	0–4	(Switzerland) Lugano	0–0	0–4
Košice (Slovakia)	1–3	(Hungary) Újpest	0–1	1–2
Universitatea Craiova (Romania)	0–0(1-3p)	(Belarus) Dinamo Minsk	0–0	0–0
Fenerbahçe (Turkey)	6–0	(Albania) Partizani	2–0	4–0
Vardar (North Macedonia)	3–0	(Georgia (country)) Samtredia	1–0	2–0
Glenavon (Northern Ireland)	1–0	(Iceland) FH	0–0	1–0
Hibernians (Malta)	2–7	(Ukraine) Chornomorets Odesa	2–5	0–2
Kapaz (Azerbaijan)	1–9	Austria Wien	0–4	1–5
Lillestrøm (Norway)	4–1	(Estonia) Flora	4–0	0–1
Motherwell (Scotland)	3–3(a)	(Finland) MyPa	1–3	2–0
Örebro (Sweden)	0–3	(Luxembourg) Avenir Beggen	0–0	0–3
Botev Plovdiv (Bulgaria)	2–0	(Georgia (country)) Dinamo Tbilisi	1–0	1–0
Slavia Sofia (Bulgaria)	0–3	(Greece) Olympiacos	0–2	0–1
Raith Rovers (Scotland)	6–2	(Faroe Islands) GÍ	4–0	2–2
Red Star Belgrade (Federal Republic of Yugoslavia)	0–1	(Switzerland) Neuchâtel Xamax	0–1	0–0
Shelbourne (Republic of Ireland)	0–6	(Iceland) ÍA	0–3	0–3
Slovan Bratislava (Slovakia)	6–0	(Croatia) Osijek	4–0	2–0
Sturm Graz (Austria)	1–2	(Czech Republic) Slavia Prague	0–1	1–1
Tirana (Albania)	0–3	(Israel) Hapoel Be'er Sheva	0–1	0–2
Skonto (Latvia)	1–2	(Slovenia) Maribor	1–0	0–2
TPV (Finland)	1–7	(Norway) Viking	0–4	1–3
Zagłębie Lubin (Poland)	1–0	(Armenia) Shirak	0–0	1–0
Zimbru Chișinău (Moldova)	2–0	(Israel) Hapoel Tel Aviv	2–0	0–0
Tirol Innsbruck (Austria)	2–7	(France) Strasbourg	1–1	1–6
Karlsruhe (Germany)	2–4	(France) Bordeaux	0–2	2–2

=== First leg ===
8 August 1995
19:00

Omonia (Cyprus)	3–0	(Malta) Sliema Wanderers
Ștefan 39' (pen.), 51'; Malekkos 75'	Report

Makario Stadium, Nicosia
Attendance: 10,861
Referee: Frank McDonald (Northern Ireland)

8 August 1995
20:00

Sparta Prague (Czech Republic)	3–1	(Turkey) Galatasaray
Nedvěd 17', 73'; Lokvenc 22'	Report	Saunders 56'

Stadion Letná, Prague
Attendance: 10,947
Referee: João Pinto Correia (Portugal)

8 August 1995
20:30

Afan Lido (Wales)	1–2	(Latvia) RAF Jelgava
Moore 29'	Report	Karašausks 19'; Bogdans 64'

Penydarren Park, Merthyr Tydfil
Attendance: 2,117
Referee: Knud Erik Fisker (Denmark)

8 August 1995
20:15

Apollon Smyrnis (Greece)	1–0	(Slovenia) Olimpija Ljubljana
Kola 41'	Report

Nikos Goumas Stadium, Athens
Attendance: 4,364
Referee: Hugh Dallas (Scotland)

8 August 1995
20:00

Bangor City (Wales)	0–4	(Poland) Widzew Łódź
	Report	Czerwiec 25', 42'; Koniarek 51', 90'

Farrar Road Stadium, Bangor
Attendance: 1,623
Referee: Amand Ancion (Belgium)

8 August 1995
20:00

Brøndby (Denmark)	3–0	(Lithuania) Inkaras Kaunas
Hansen 12'; Bjur 42'; E. Sand 82'	Report

Brøndby Stadion, Brøndbyvester
Attendance: 6,470
Referee: Gheorge Constantin (Romania)

8 August 1995
21:00

Crusaders (Northern Ireland)	1–2	(Denmark) Silkeborg
G. Hunter 66'	Report	Fernandez 15'; Larsen 47' (pen.)

Seaview, Belfast
Attendance: 3,600
Referee: Herman van Dijk (Netherlands)

8 August 1995
17:00

Dinamo București (Romania)	0–1	(Bulgaria) Levski Sofia
	Report	Varga 30' (o.g.)

Stadionul Dinamo, Bucharest
Attendance: 3,260
Referee: Roelof Luinge (Netherlands)

8 August 1995
19:30

Jeunesse Esch (Luxembourg)	0–0	(Switzerland) Lugano
	Report

Stade de la Frontière, Esch-sur-Alzette
Attendance: 1,700
Referee: Andrew Waddell (Scotland)

8 August 1995
19:00

Košice (Slovakia)	0–1	(Hungary) Újpest
	Report	Tiefenbach 39'

Všešportový areál, Košice
Attendance: 8,725
Referee: Manfred Schüttengruber (Austria)

8 August 1995
17:00

Universitatea Craiova (Romania)	0–0	(Belarus) Dinamo Minsk
	Report

Stadionul Central, Craiova
Attendance: 12,000
Referee: Werner Müller (Switzerland)

8 August 1995
19:00

Fenerbahçe (Turkey)	2–0	(Albania) Partizani
Bolić 71'; Uygun 87'	Report

İzmit İsmetpaşa Stadium, İzmit
Attendance: 37,455
Referee: Stefan Ormandzhiev (Bulgaria)

8 August 1995
20:00

Vardar (North Macedonia)	1–0	(Georgia (country)) Samtredia
Nikolovski 9'	Report

Stadion Gradski Park, Skopje
Attendance: 5,211
Referee: Sándor Piller (Hungary)

8 August 1995
20:30

Glenavon (Northern Ireland)	0–0	(Iceland) FH
	Report

Mourneview Park, Lurgan
Attendance: 1,826
Referee: Lutz Michael Fröhlich (Germany)

8 August 1995
20:00

Hibernians (Malta)	2–5	(Ukraine) Chornomorets Odesa
Lawrence 27'; Sultana 87'	Report	Huseynov 15'; Gashkin 23'; Musolitin 40', 53'; Kardash 48'

National Stadium, Ta' Qali
Attendance: 1,447
Referee: Sotirios Vorgias (Greece)

8 August 1995
14:00

Kapaz (Azerbaijan)	0–4	Austria Wien
	Report	Mjelde 31'; Belajić 39'; Flögel 50'; Pacult 85'

Mehdi Huseynzade Stadium, Sumgait
Attendance: 10,000
Referee: István Vad (Hungary)

8 August 1995
19:00

Lillestrøm (Norway)	4–0	(Estonia) Flora
Ingelstad 43'; Ingebrigtsen 60'; Gulbrandsen 69', 87'	Report

Åråsen stadion, Lillestrøm
Attendance: 1,294
Referee: Lars Gerner (Denmark)

8 August 1995
20:45

Motherwell (Scotland)	1–3	(Finland) MyPa
McSkimming 8'	Report	Grönholm 12'; Tiainen 30'; Mahlio 56'

Fir Park, Motherwell
Attendance: 8,280
Referee: René Temmink (Netherlands)

8 August 1995
19:00

Örebro (Sweden)	0–0	(Luxembourg) Avenir Beggen
	Report

Eyravallen, Örebro
Attendance: 1,800
Referee: Timo Keltanen (Finland)

8 August 1995
18:00

Botev Plovdiv (Bulgaria)	1–0	(Georgia (country)) Dinamo Tbilisi
Gerov 43'	Report

Stadion Hristo Botev, Plovdiv
Attendance: 3,400
Referee: Vassilios Nikakis (Greece)

8 August 1995
18:30

Slavia Sofia (Bulgaria)	0–2	(Greece) Olympiacos
	Report	Ivić 83'; Juskowiak 89'

Vasil Levski National Stadium, Sofia
Attendance: 5,000
Referee: Paul Durkin (England)

8 August 1995
20:30

Raith Rovers (Scotland)	4–0	(Faroe Islands) GÍ
Dair 21'; Rougier 47'; McAnespie 75'; Cameron 78'	Report

Stark's Park, Kirkcaldy
Attendance: 5,082
Referee: Bragi Bergmann (Iceland)

8 August 1995
20:00

Red Star Belgrade (Federal Republic of Yugoslavia)	0–1	(Switzerland) Neuchâtel Xamax
	Report	Wittl 85'

Red Star Stadium, Belgrade
Attendance: 25,641
Referee: Alain Sars (France)

8 August 1995
20:45

Shelbourne (Republic of Ireland)	0–3	(Iceland) ÍA
	Report	B. Gunnlaugsson 21'; A. Gunnlaugsson 83'; Reynisson 84'

Tolka Park, Dublin
Attendance: 3,200
Referee: Kurt Zuppinger (Switzerland)

8 August 1995
18:30

Slovan Bratislava (Slovakia)	4–0	(Croatia) Osijek
Tittel 8'; Rusnák 15', 40'; Faktor 88'	Report

Tehelné pole, Bratislava
Attendance: 8,300
Referee: Juan Fernández Marín (Spain)

8 August 1995
18:15

Sturm Graz (Austria)	0–1	(Czech Republic) Slavia Prague
	Report	Bejbl 83' (pen.)

Gruabn, Graz
Attendance: 7,000
Referee: Philippe Leduc (France)

8 August 1995
17:00

Tirana (Albania)	0–1	(Israel) Hapoel Be'er Sheva
	Report	Zeiberliņš 1'

Qemal Stafa Stadium, Tirana
Attendance: 6,500
Referee: Andreas Georgiou (Cyprus)

8 August 1995
17:30

Skonto (Latvia)	1–0	(Slovenia) Maribor
Babičevs 12'	Report

Daugava Stadium, Riga
Attendance: 2,000
Referee: Marek Kowalczyk (Poland)

8 August 1995
17:30

TPV (Finland)	0–4	(Norway) Viking
	Report	Bøe 48'; Østenstad 58'; Medalen 73'; Sørloth 86'

Tammelan Stadion, Tampere
Attendance: 2,192
Referee: Sten Johanzon (Sweden)

8 August 1995
17:00

Zagłębie Lubin (Poland)	0–0	(Armenia) Shirak
	Report

Stadion Zagłębia Lubin, Lubin
Attendance: 6,700
Referee: Andrey Butenko (Russia)

8 August 1995
17:00

Zimbru Chișinău (Moldova)	2–0	(Israel) Hapoel Tel Aviv
Gavriliuc 28'; Rebeja 70'	Report

Stadionul Republican, Chișinău
Attendance: 9,000
Referee: Karol Ihring (Slovakia)

8 August 1995
20:20

Tirol Innsbruck (Austria)	1–1	(France) Strasbourg
Schiener 62'	Report	Sauzée 26'

Tivoli, Innsbruck
Attendance: 8,300
Referee: Michael Donald Reed (England)

8 August 1995
20:30

Karlsruhe (Germany)	0–2	(France) Bordeaux
	Report	Dugarry 41'; Dutuel 88'

Wildparkstadion, Karlsruhe
Attendance: 16,000
Referee: Antonio Jesús López Nieto (Spain)

9 August 1995
20:45

Dundalk (Republic of Ireland)	0–2	(Sweden) Malmö FF
	Report	Pettersson 1'; A. Andersson 10'

United Park, Drogheda
Attendance: 2,100
Referee: Didier Pauchard (France)

=== Second leg ===
22 August 1995
20:00

Sliema Wanderers (Malta)	1–2	(Cyprus) Omonia
Suda 43'	Report	Ștefan 59'; Xiourouppas 88'

National Stadium, Ta' Qali
Attendance: 758
Referee: Pierluigi Collina (Italy)

Omonia won 5–1 on aggregate.

22 August 1995
19:00

Galatasaray (Turkey)	1–1	(Czech Republic) Sparta Prague
Saunders 4'	Report	Nedvěd 22'

Ali Sami Yen Stadium, Istanbul
Attendance: 27,762
Referee: Gianni Beschin (Italy)

Sparta Prague won 4–2 on aggregate.

22 August 1995
17:00

RAF Jelgava (Latvia)	0–0	(Wales) Afan Lido
	Report

Daugava Stadium, Riga
Attendance: 650
Referee: Otar Guntadze (Georgia)

RAF Jelgava won 2–1 on aggregate.

22 August 1995
17:30

Olimpija Ljubljana (Slovenia)	3–1	(Greece) Apollon Smyrnis
Bozgo 9', 66'; Zulič 79'	Report	Kola 2'

Stadion Bežigrad, Ljubljana
Attendance: 1,800
Referee: Celino Gracia Redondo (Spain)

Olimpija Ljubljana won 3–2 on aggregate.

22 August 1995
17:00

Widzew Łódź (Poland)	1–0	(Wales) Bangor City
Pikuta 83'	Report

Stadion Widzewa Łódź, Łódź
Attendance: 4,371
Referee: Alfred Wieser (Austria)

Widzew Łódź won 5–0 on aggregate.

22 August 1995
18:00

Inkaras Kaunas (Lithuania)	0–3	(Denmark) Brøndby
	Report	Møller 53', 65'; Risager 62'

Darius and Girėnas Stadium, Kaunas
Attendance: 7,000
Referee: Roy Helge Olsen (Norway)

Brøndby won 6–0 on aggregate.

22 August 1995
19:00

Silkeborg (Denmark)	4–0	(Northern Ireland) Crusaders
Larsen 8'; Fernandez 51'; Sommer 68', 82'	Report

Silkeborg Stadion, Silkeborg
Attendance: 4,339
Referee: Mika Peltola (Finland)

Silkeborg won 6–1 on aggregate.

22 August 1995
19:00

Levksi Sofia (Bulgaria)	1–1 (a.e.t.)	(Romania) Dinamo București
Vasilev 108'	Report	Lupu 70'

Stadion Georgi Asparuhov, Sofia
Attendance: 7,000
Referee: Loris Stafoggia (Italy)

Levski Sofia won 2–1 on aggregate.

22 August 1995
19:00

Újpest (Hungary)	2–1	(Slovakia) Košice
Bérczy 56'; Szanyó 80' (pen.)	Report	Weiss 85'

Megyeri úti Stadion, Budapest
Attendance: 5,615
Referee: Christer Fällström (Sweden)

Újpest won 3–1 on aggregate.

22 August 1995
18:00

Dinamo Minsk (Belarus)	0–0 (a.e.t.)	(Romania) Universitatea Craiova
	Report
Penalties
Kachura (penalty scored); Khatskevich (penalty scored); Shtanyuk (penalty scored)	3–1	(penalty scored) Papură; (penalty missed) Gane; (penalty missed) Ungur; (penalty missed) Olăroiu

Dinamo Stadium, Minsk
Attendance: 9,700
Referee: Guy Goethals (Belgium)

0–0 on aggregate. Dinamo Minsk won 3–1 on penalties.

22 August 1995
16:30

Partizani (Albania)	0–4	(Turkey) Fenerbahçe
	Report	Uygun 14'; Şentürk 24'; Bolić 60'; Taşkıran 86'

Qemal Stafa Stadium, Tirana
Attendance: 3,085
Referee: Antoine de Pandis (France)

Fenerbahçe won 6–0 on aggregate.

22 August 1995
15:00

Samtredia (Georgia (country))	0–2	(North Macedonia) Vardar
	Report	Serafimovski 19'; Petreski 39'

Central Stadium, Batumi
Attendance: 13,000
Referee: Wojciech Rudy (Poland)

Vardar won 3–0 on aggregate.

22 August 1995
18:00

Chornomorets Odesa (Ukraine)	2–0	(Malta) Hibernians
Kozakevych 34'; Musolitin 75'	Report

Central Stadium Chornomorets, Odesa
Attendance: 3,600
Referee: Kostadin Gerginov (Bulgaria)

Chornomorets Odesa won 7–2 on aggregate.

22 August 1995
20:20

Austria Wien	5–1	(Azerbaijan) Kapaz
Mjelde 10', 29'; Ogris 17', 42'; Glatzer 64'	Report	İ. Süleymanov 26'

Franz-Horr-Stadion, Vienna
Attendance: 1,700
Referee: Daood Suheil (Israel)

Austria Wien won 9–1 on aggregate.

22 August 1995
17:00

Flora (Estonia)	1–0	(Norway) Lillestrøm
Korgalidze 54'	Report

Kadriorg Stadium, Tallinn
Attendance: 850
Referee: Syarhey Shmolik (Belarus)

Lillestrøm won 4–1 on aggregate.

22 August 1995
17:30

MyPa (Finland)	0–2	(Scotland) Motherwell
	Report	Burns 29'; Arnott 69'

Saviniemen jalkapallostadion, Kouvola
Attendance: 3,880
Referee: Sven Kjelbrott (Norway)

3–3 on aggregate. MyPa won on away goals.

22 August 1995
19:30

Avenir Beggen (Luxembourg)	1–1	(Sweden) Örebro
Holtz 20'	Report	Birgisson 88'

Stade Henri-Dunant, Luxembourg
Attendance: 1,030
Referee: José Veiga Trigo (Portugal)

Örebro fielded an ineligible player, so the match was awarded 3–0 to Avenir Beggen. Avenir Beggen won 3–0 on aggregate.

22 August 1995
17:00

Dinamo Tbilisi (Georgia (country))	0–1	(Bulgaria) Botev Plovdiv
	Report	Vidolov 89'

Boris Paichadze National Stadium, Tbilisi
Attendance: 18,500
Referee: Hans-Jürger Weber (Germany)

Botev Plovdiv won 2–0 on aggregate.

22 August 1995
20:00

Olympiacos (Greece)	1–0	(Bulgaria) Slavia Sofia
Ivić 10'	Report

O.A.K.A., Athens
Attendance: 13,570
Referee: Serge Muhmenthaler (Switzerland)

Olympiacos won 3–0 on aggregate.

22 August 1995
19:30

GÍ (Faroe Islands)	2–2	(Scotland) Raith Rovers
H. Jarnskor 80'; M. Jarnskor 88'	Report	Lennon 30'; Crawford 82'

Svangaskarð, Toftir
Attendance: 350
Referee: Alan Howells (Wales)

Raith Rovers won 6–2 on aggregate.

22 August 1995
20:00

Neuchâtel Xamax (Switzerland)	0–0	(Federal Republic of Yugoslavia) Red Star Belgrade
	Report

Stade de la Maladière, Neuchâtel
Attendance: 6,500
Referee: Bernd Heynemann (Germany)

Neuchâtel Xamax won 1–0 on aggregate.

22 August 1995
19:45

Osijek (Croatia)	0–2	(Slovakia) Slovan Bratislava
	Report	Rusnák 54'; Gomes 86'

Stadion Kranjčevićeva, Zagreb
Attendance: 1,420
Referee: Markus Merk (Germany)

Slovan Bratislava won 6–0 on aggregate.

22 August 1995
18:00

Slavia Prague (Czech Republic)	1–1	(Austria) Sturm Graz
Hyský 45'	Report	Haas 54'

Stadion Eden, Prague
Attendance: 5,074
Referee: Walter Cinciripini (Italy)

Slavia Prague won 2–1 on aggregate.

22 August 1995
18:00

Hapoel Be'er Sheva (Israel)	2–0	(Albania) Tirana
Husyev 19'; Avigdor 22'	Report

Vasermil Stadium, Beersheba
Attendance: 3,401
Referee: Metin Tokat (Turkey)

Hapoel Be'er Sheva won 3–0 on aggregate.

22 August 1995
18:00

Maribor (Slovenia)	2–0	(Latvia) Skonto
Šterbal 15'; Fricelj 20'	Report

Ljudski vrt, Maribor
Attendance: 8,000
Referee: Bujar Pregja (Albania)

Maribor won 2–1 on aggregate.

22 August 1995
19:00

Viking (Norway)	3–1	(Finland) TPV
Bergersen 4', 41'; Sørloth 62'	Report	Wiss 88' (pen.)

Stavanger stadion, Stavanger
Attendance: 2,354
Referee: Vladimir Ovchinnikov (Russia)

Viking won 7–1 on aggregate.

22 August 1995
16:00

Shirak (Armenia)	0–1	(Poland) Zagłębie Lubin
	Report	Machaj 22'

Hrazdan Stadium, Yerevan
Attendance: 5,500
Referee: Serhiy Tatulyan (Ukraine)

Zagłębie Lubin won 1–0 on aggregate.

22 August 1995
17:00

Hapoel Tel Aviv (Israel)	0–0	(Moldova) Zimbru Chișinău
	Report

Bloomfield Stadium, Tel Aviv
Attendance: 20,000
Referee: Adrian Porumboiu (Romania)

Zimbru Chișinău won 2–0 on aggregate.

22 August 1995
18:00

Strasbourg (France)	6–1	(Austria) Tirol Innsbruck
Sauzée 16', 55'; Mostovoi 66'; Keller 67', 71', 90+2'	Report	Kirchler 51'

Stade de la Meinau, Strasbourg
Attendance: 13,550
Referee: Frans van den Wijngaert (Belgium)

Strasbourg won 7–2 on aggregate.

22 August 1995
20:30

Bordeaux (France)	2–2	(Germany) Karlsruhe
Lizarazu 2' (pen.), 10'	Report	Fink 40'; Schmitt 87'

Parc Lescure, Bordeaux
Attendance: 20,000
Referee: Pierluigi Pairetto (Italy)

Bordeaux won 4–2 on aggregate.

23 August 1995
19:00

Malmö FF (Sweden)	2–0	(Republic of Ireland) Dundalk
A. Andersson 22'; Fjellström 50'	Report

Malmö IP, Malmö
Attendance: 4,112
Referee: Vladimír Hriňák (Slovakia)

Malmö FF won 4–0 on aggregate.

23 August 1995
20:30

Lugano (Switzerland)	4–0	(Luxembourg) Jeunesse Esch
Erceg 18', 45', 54'; Esposito 35'	Report

Stadio di Cornaredo, Lugano
Attendance: 4,200
Referee: Lawrence Sammut (Malta)

Lugano won 4-0 on aggregate.

23 August 1995
20:00

FH (Iceland)	0–1	(Northern Ireland) Glenavon
	Report	Johnston 64'

Kaplakriki, Hafnarfjörður
Attendance: 457
Referee: Willie Young (Scotland)

Glenavon won 1–0 on aggregate.

23 August 1995
20:00

ÍA (Iceland)	3–0	(Republic of Ireland) Shelbourne
S. Jónsson 45'; Ó. Þórðarson 58'; Pétursson 90'	Report

Akranesvöllur, Akranes
Attendance: 1,355
Referee: Tore Hollung (Norway)

ÍA won 6–0 on aggregate.

== First round ==
Team 1	Agg.	Team 2	1st leg	2nd leg
Lugano (Switzerland)	2–1	(Italy) Internazionale	1–1	1–0
Milan (Italy)	8–1	(Poland) Zagłębie Lubin	4–0	4–1
Sparta Prague (Czech Republic)	(a)2–2	(Denmark) Silkeborg	0–1	2–1
Monaco (France)	1–3	(England) Leeds United	0–3	1–0
Bayern Munich (Germany)	5–1	(Russia) Lokomotiv Moscow	0–1	5–0
Brøndby (Denmark)	3–0	(Norway) Lillestrøm	3–0	0–0
Chornomorets Odesa (Ukraine)	1–1 (6-5p)	(Poland) Widzew Łódź	1–0	0–1
Spartak Vladikavkaz (Russia)	1–2	(England) Liverpool	1–2	0–0
Fenerbahçe (Turkey)	1–4	(Spain) Real Betis	1–2	0–2
Austria Wien	1–3	(Belarus) Dinamo Minsk	1–2	0–1
Vardar (North Macedonia)	1–3	(France) Bordeaux	0–2	1–1
Glenavon (Northern Ireland)	0–7	(Germany) Werder Bremen	0–2	0–5
Hapoel Be'er Sheva (Israel)	0–12	(Spain) Barcelona	0–7	0–5
Lierse (Belgium)	2–5	(Portugal) Benfica	1–3	1–2
Malmö FF (Sweden)	2–2(a)	(England) Nottingham Forest	2–1	0–1
MyPa (Finland)	2–8	(Netherlands) PSV Eindhoven	1–1	1–7
Neuchâtel Xamax (Switzerland)	1–5	(Italy) Roma	1–1	0–4
Olympiacos (Greece)	5–1	(Slovenia) Maribor	2–0	3–1
Levski Sofia (Bulgaria)	1–3	(Belgium) Eendracht Aalst	1–2	0–1
Raith Rovers (Scotland)	3–2	(Iceland) ÍA	3–1	0–1
Lens (France)	13–0	(Luxembourg) Avenir Beggen	6–0	7–0
Strasbourg (France)	5–0	(Hungary) Újpest	3–0	2–0
Roda JC (Netherlands)	5–2	(Slovenia) Olimpija Ljubljana	5–0	0–2
Farense (Portugal)	0–2	(France) Lyon	0–1	0–1
Freiburg (Germany)	1–2	(Czech Republic) Slavia Prague	1–2	0–0
Rotor Volgograd (Russia)	(a)2–2	(England) Manchester United	0–0	2–2
Sevilla (Spain)	3–1	(Bulgaria) Botev Plovdiv	2–0	1–1
Slovan Bratislava (Slovakia)	2–4	(Germany) Kaiserslautern	2–1	0–3
Lazio (Italy)	7–1	(Cyprus) Omonia	5–0	2–1
Viking (Norway)	1–2	(France) Auxerre	1–1	0–1
Vitória de Guimarães (Portugal)	3–1	(Belgium) Standard Liège	3–1	0–0
Zimbru Chișinău (Moldova)	3–1	(Latvia) RAF Jelgava	1–0	2–1

=== First leg ===
12 September 1995
20:30

Lugano (Switzerland)	1–1	(Italy) Internazionale
Carrasco 67'	Report	Roberto Carlos 12'

Stadio di Cornaredo, Lugano
Attendance: 12,300
Referee: Dick Jol (Netherlands)

12 September 1995
20:45

Milan (Italy)	4–0	(Poland) Zagłębie Lubin
Savićević 11'; Machaj 47' (o.g.); Weah 66'; Boban 71'	Report

San Siro, Milan
Attendance: 7,629
Referee: Christer Fällström (Sweden)

12 September 1995
20:15

Sparta Prague (Czech Republic)	0–1	(Denmark) Silkeborg
	Report	Fernandez 6'

Stadion Letná, Prague
Attendance: 10,875
Referee: Ion Crăciunescu (Romania)

12 September 1995
20:30

Monaco (France)	0–3	(England) Leeds United
	Report	Yeboah 3', 65', 80'

Stade Louis-II, Monaco
Attendance: 8,900
Referee: José María García-Aranda (Spain)

12 September 1995
20:15

Bayern Munich (Germany)	0–1	(Russia) Lokomotiv Moscow
	Report	Kharlachyov 70'

Olympiastadion, Munich
Attendance: 16,000
Referee: Guy Goethals (Belgium)

12 September 1995
20:00

Brøndby (Denmark)	3–0	(Norway) Lillestrøm
Hansen 38'; Eggen 58'; Bjur 87' (pen.)	Report

Brøndby Stadion, Brøndbyvester
Attendance: 7,686
Referee: John Ashman (Wales)

12 September 1995
17:00

Chornomorets Odesa (Ukraine)	1–0	(Poland) Widzew Łódź
Kozakevych 87'	Report

Central Stadium Chornomorets, Odesa
Attendance: 4,800
Referee: Mika Peltola (Finland)

12 September 1995
18:30

Spartak Vladikavkaz (Russia)	1–2	(England) Liverpool
Qosimov 20'	Report	McManaman 33'; Redknapp 53'

Republican Spartak Stadium, Vladikavkaz
Attendance: 33,500
Referee: Rémi Harrel (France)

12 September 1995
19:00

Fenerbahçe (Turkey)	1–2	(Spain) Real Betis
Kocaman 74'	Report	Pier 27'; Sabas 79'

Şükrü Saracoğlu Stadium, Istanbul
Attendance: 13,500
Referee: Sergei Khusainov (Russia)

12 September 1995
20:20

Austria Wien	1–2	(Belarus) Dinamo Minsk
Kogler 84'	Report	Zhuravel 26'; Shukanaw 40'

Franz-Horr-Stadion, Vienna
Attendance: 3,800
Referee: Stephen Lodge (England)

12 September 1995
19:00

Hapoel Be'er Sheva (Israel)	0–7	(Spain) Barcelona
	Report	De la Peña 4'; Roger 45', 68', 78'; Óscar 63'; Figo 65', 81'

Vasermil Stadium, Beersheba
Attendance: 13,500
Referee: Theodoros Kefalas (Greece)

12 September 1995
20:30

Lierse (Belgium)	1–3	(Portugal) Benfica
Huysmans 39' (pen.)	Report	Valdo 25' (pen.); Marcelo 51'; Paulo Bento 62'

Herman Vanderpoortenstadion, Lier
Attendance: 9,300
Referee: Anders Frisk (Sweden)

12 September 1995
19:00

Malmö FF (Sweden)	2–1	(England) Nottingham Forest
J. Persson 59'; A. Andersson 71'	Report	Woan 38'

Malmö stadion, Malmö
Attendance: 12,486
Referee: Hellmut Krug (Germany)

12 September 1995
18:00

MyPa (Finland)	1–1	(Netherlands) PSV Eindhoven
Mahlio 29'	Report	Ronaldo 50'

Lahden stadion, Lahti
Attendance: 3,600
Referee: Volodymyr Pianykh (Ukraine)

12 September 1995
20:30

Neuchâtel Xamax (Switzerland)	1–1	(Italy) Roma
Jeanneret 13'	Report	Moriero 19'

Stade de la Maladière, Neuchâtel
Attendance: 9,060
Referee: David Elleray (England)

12 September 1995
20:00

Olympiacos (Greece)	2–0	(Slovenia) Maribor
Juskowiak 52'; Skartados 68' (pen.)	Report

Karaiskakis Stadium, Piraeus
Attendance: 20,200
Referee: Kostadin Gerginov (Bulgaria)

12 September 1995
18:30

Levski Sofia (Bulgaria)	1–2	(Belgium) Eendracht Aalst
Vasilev 68'	Report	Markov 57' (o.g.); Paas 77'

Stadion Georgi Asparuhov, Sofia
Attendance: 18,000
Referee: Nikolai Levnikov (Russia)

12 September 1995
20:30

Raith Rovers (Scotland)	3–1	(Iceland) ÍA
Lennon 14', 66'; Wilson 79'	Report	Ó. Þórðarson 44'

Stark's Park, Kirkcaldy
Attendance: 5,284
Referee: Branimir Babarogić (FR Yugoslavia)

12 September 1995
20:30

Strasbourg (France)	3–0	(Hungary) Újpest
Zitelli 7'; Lebœuf 72' (pen.); Baticle 74'	Report

Stade de la Meinau, Strasbourg
Attendance: 22,579
Referee: José Pratas (Portugal)

12 September 1995
20:30

Roda JC (Netherlands)	5–0	(Slovenia) Olimpija Ljubljana
Van Galen 2'; Roelofsen 23'; Babangida 34'; Graef 44'; De Kock 88' (pen.)	Report

Gemeentelijk Sportpark Kaalheide, Kerkrade
Attendance: 10,400
Referee: Gerd Grabher (Austria)

12 September 1995
18:00

Freiburg (Germany)	1–2	(Czech Republic) Slavia Prague
Todt 78'	Report	Novotný 22'; Pěnička 75'

Dreisamstadion, Freiburg im Breisgau
Attendance: 18,000
Referee: Knud Erik Fisker (Denmark)

12 September 1995
18:00

Rotor Volgograd (Russia)	0–0	(England) Manchester United
	Report

Central Stadium, Volgograd
Attendance: 36,800
Referee: Peter Mikkelsen (Denmark)

12 September 1995
21:00

Sevilla (Spain)	2–0	(Bulgaria) Botev Plovdiv
Šuker 29', 33'	Report

Estadio Ramón Sánchez-Pizjuán, Seville
Attendance: 37,500
Referee: Markus Merk (Germany)

12 September 1995
16:00

Slovan Bratislava (Slovakia)	2–1	(Germany) Kaiserslautern
Tittel 28'; Soboňa 74'	Report	Hollerbach 64'

Tehelné pole, Bratislava
Attendance: 17,000
Referee: Karl-Erik Nilsson (Sweden)

12 September 1995
20:30

Lazio (Italy)	5–0	(Cyprus) Omonia
Casiraghi 11', 16', 87'; Rambaudi 52'; Signori 55' (pen.)	Report

Stadio Olimpico, Rome
Attendance: 30,660
Referee: Werner Müller (Switzerland)

12 September 1995
18:00

Viking (Norway)	1–1	(France) Auxerre
Ulfstein 55'	Report	West 14'

Stavanger stadion, Stavanger
Attendance: 4,097
Referee: Paul Durkin (England)

12 September 1995
21:45

Vitória de Guimarães (Portugal)	3–1	(Belgium) Standard Liège
Gilmar 22', 88'; Edinho 68'	Report	Schepens 32'

Estádio D. Afonso Henriques, Guimarães
Attendance: 16,200
Referee: Jim McCluskey (Scotland)

12 September 1995
18:00

Zimbru Chișinău (Moldova)	1–0	(Latvia) RAF Jelgava
Testemițanu 40'	Report

Stadionul Republican, Chișinău
Attendance: 8,000
Referee: Daood Suheil (Israel)

13 September 1995
18:00

Glenavon (Northern Ireland)	0–2	(Germany) Werder Bremen
	Report	Cardoso 59'; Vier 88'

Mourneview Park, Lurgan
Attendance: 4,200
Referee: René Temmink (Netherlands)

13 September 1995
19:00

Farense (Portugal)	0–1	(France) Lyon
	Report	Giuly 5'

Estádio de São Luís, Faro
Attendance: 10,500
Referee: Urs Meier (Switzerland)

14 September 1995
18:30

Vardar (North Macedonia)	0–2	(France) Bordeaux
	Report	Bancarel 25', 75'

Stadion Gradski Park, Skopje
Attendance: 18,500
Referee: Karol Ihring (Slovakia)

14 September 1995
20:30

Lens (France)	6–0	(Luxembourg) Avenir Beggen
Camara 11', 49'; Meyrieu 33'; Tiéhi 62', 74'; Boli 70'	Report

Stade Félix-Bollaert, Lens
Attendance: 13,437
Referee: Mateo Beusan (Croatia)

=== Second leg ===
26 September 1995
20:30

Internazionale (Italy)	0–1	(Switzerland) Lugano
	Report	Carrasco 85'

Stadio Giuseppe Meazza, Milan
Attendance: 15,955
Referee: Hans-Jürgen Weber (Germany)

Lugano won 2–1 on aggregate.

26 September 1995
13:30

Zagłębie Lubin (Poland)	1–4	(Italy) Milan
Krzyżanowski 73'	Report	Eranio 53'; Simone 63'; Boban 86', 90'

Stadion Zagłębia Lubin, Lubin
Attendance: 13,800
Referee: Oğuz Sarvan (Turkey)

Milan won 8–1 on aggregate.

26 September 1995
20:00

Silkeborg (Denmark)	1–2	(Czech Republic) Sparta Prague
Duus 52'	Report	Lokvenc 21'; J. Němec 51'

Silkeborg Stadion, Silkeborg
Attendance: 5,200
Referee: Georg Dardenne (Germany)

2–2 on aggregate. Sparta Prague won on away goals.

26 September 1995
21:00

Leeds United (England)	0–1	(France) Monaco
	Report	Anderson 22'

Elland Road, Leeds
Attendance: 24,501
Referee: Serge Muhmenthaler (Switzerland)

Leeds United won 3–1 on aggregate.

26 September 1995
18:00

Lokomotiv Moscow (Russia)	0–5	(Germany) Bayern Munich
	Report	Klinsmann 26', 34'; Herzog 39'; Scholl 45'; Strunz 78'

Lokomotiv Stadium, Moscow
Attendance: 20,000
Referee: Karl-Erik Nilsson (Sweden)

Bayern Munich won 5–1 on aggregate.

26 September 1995
15:30

Lillestrøm (Norway)	0–0	(Denmark) Brøndby
	Report

Åråsen stadion, Lillestrøm
Attendance: 1,090
Referee: Wojciech Rudy (Poland)

Brøndby won 3–0 on aggregate.

26 September 1995
20:00

Widzew Łódź (Poland)	1–0 (a.e.t.)	(Ukraine) Chornomorets Odesa
Mikhalchuk 81'	Report
Penalties
Czerwiec (penalty scored); Siadaczka (penalty scored); Podolski (penalty scored); Mikhalchuk (penalty scored); Koniarek (penalty missed); Boguś (penalty scored); Bajor (penalty missed)	5–6	(penalty scored) Ternavsky; (penalty missed) Parfyonov; (penalty scored) Zotov; (penalty scored) Kardash; (penalty scored) Suslov; (penalty scored) Vasylkiv; (penalty scored) Bukel

Stadion Widzewa Łódź, Łódź
Attendance: 10,125
Referee: István Vad (Hungary)

1–1 on aggregate. Chornomorets Odesa won 6–5 on penalties.

26 September 1995
21:00

Liverpool (England)	0–0	(Russia) Spartak Vladikavkaz
	Report

Anfield, Liverpool
Attendance: 35,042
Referee: Jiří Ulrich (Czech Republic)

Liverpool won 2–1 on aggregate.

26 September 1995
21:30

Real Betis (Spain)	2–0	(Turkey) Fenerbahçe
Alexis 21' (pen.); Cañas 38'	Report

Estadio Benito Villamarín, Seville
Attendance: 34,900
Referee: Ryszard Wójcik (Poland)

Real Betis won 4–1 on aggregate.

26 September 1995
18:10

Dinamo Minsk (Belarus)	1–0	Austria Wien
Byalkevich 90'	Report

Dinamo Stadium, Minsk
Attendance: 10,800
Referee: Hugh Dallas (Scotland)

Dinamo Minsk won 3–1 on aggregate.

26 September 1995
21:00

Barcelona (Spain)	5–0	(Israel) Hapoel Be'er Sheva
Guardiola 12'; Hagi 27'; Velamazán 52'; Carreras 62'; Amor 66'	Report

Estadio del Futbol Club Barcelona, Barcelona
Attendance: 24,000
Referee: Richard O'Hanlon (Republic of Ireland)

Barcelona won 12–0 on aggregate.

26 September 1995
22:00

Benfica (Portugal)	2–1	(Belgium) Lierse
João Pinto 25'; Kenedy 60'	Report	Van Kerckhoven 34'

Estádio da Luz, Lisbon
Attendance: 37,800
Referee: Philippe Leduc (France)

Benfica won 5–2 on aggregate.

26 September 1995
20:45

Nottingham Forest (England)	1–0	(Sweden) Malmö FF
Roy 70'	Report

City Ground, West Bridgford
Attendance: 23,817
Referee: Marc Batta (France)

2–2 on aggregate. Nottingham Forest won on away goals.

26 September 1995
20:30

PSV Eindhoven (Netherlands)	7–1	(Finland) MyPa
Ronaldo 14', 45', 72', 82'; Jonk 56', 70'; Hoekstra 65'	Report	Keskitalo 16'

Philips Stadion, Eindhoven
Attendance: 10,800
Referee: Mike Reed (England)

PSV Eindhoven won 8–2 on aggregate.

26 September 1995
19:00

Roma (Italy)	4–0	(Switzerland) Neuchâtel Xamax
Balbo 26', 36'; Fonseca 32'; Rueda 55' (o.g.)	Report

Stadio Olimpico, Rome
Attendance: 18,953
Referee: Marnix Sandra (Belgium)

Roma won 5–1 on aggregate.

26 September 1995
20:30

Maribor (Slovenia)	1–3	(Greece) Olympiacos
Karić 70' (pen.)	Report	Ivić 37'; Skartados 64' (pen.); Chatzidis 83'

Ljudski vrt, Maribor
Attendance: 5,300
Referee: Karel Bohuněk (Czech Republic)

Olympiacos won 5–1 on aggregate.

26 September 1995
20:15

Eendracht Aalst (Belgium)	1–0	(Bulgaria) Levski Sofia
Lamberg 59'	Report

Pierre Cornelisstadion, Aalst
Attendance: 7,500
Referee: Pierluigi Pairetto (Italy)

Eendracht Aalst won 3–1 on aggregate.

26 September 1995
18:00

ÍA (Iceland)	1–0	(Scotland) Raith Rovers
A. Gunnlaugsson 51'	Report

Akranesvöllur, Akranes
Attendance: 4,000
Referee: Roelof Luinge (Netherlands)

Raith Rovers won 3–2 on aggregate.

26 September 1995
18:00

Olimpija Ljubljana (Slovenia)	2–0	(Netherlands) Roda JC
Bozgo 37' (pen.); Zulič 75' (pen.)	Report

Stadion Bežigrad, Ljubljana
Attendance: 2,200
Referee: Giorgos Bikas (Greece)

Roda JC won 5–2 on aggregate.

26 September 1995
18:00

Lyon (France)	1–0	(Portugal) Farense
Sassus 47'	Report

Stade de Gerland, Lyon
Attendance: 13,800
Referee: Alfred Wieser (Austria)

Lyon won 2–0 on aggregate.

26 September 1995
16:00

Slavia Prague (Czech Republic)	0–0	(Germany) Freiburg
	Report

Stadion Eden, Prague
Attendance: 9,300
Referee: José Rubio Valdivieso (Spain)

Slavia Prague won 2–1 on aggregate.

26 September 1995
21:00

Manchester United (England)	2–2	(Russia) Rotor Volgograd
Scholes 59'; Schmeichel 88'	Report	Niederhaus 16'; Veretennikov 24'

Old Trafford, Manchester
Attendance: 29,724
Referee: Bernd Heynemann (Germany)

2–2 on aggregate. Rotor Volgograd won on away goals.

26 September 1995
18:00

Botev Plovdiv (Bulgaria)	1–1	(Spain) Sevilla
Ivanov 69'	Report	Monchu 57'

Stadion Hristo Botev, Plovdiv
Attendance: 9,100
Referee: Pierluigi Collina (Italy)

Sevilla won 3–1 on aggregate.

26 September 1995
20:30

Kaiserslautern (Germany)	3–0	(Slovakia) Slovan Bratislava
Wegmann 27', 56'; Wollitz 38'	Report

Fritz-Walter-Stadion, Kaiserslautern
Attendance: 13,500
Referee: Ahmet Çakar (Turkey)

Kaiserslautern won 4–2 on aggregate.

26 September 1995
19:30

Omonia (Cyprus)	1–2	(Italy) Lazio
Xiourouppas 68'	Report	Casiraghi 15'; Di Vaio 75'

Makario Stadium, Nicosia
Attendance: 4,400
Referee: Hermann Albrecht (Germany)

Lazio won 7–1 on aggregate.

26 September 1995
20:30

Auxerre (France)	1–0	(Norway) Viking
Silvestre 47'	Report

Stade de l'Abbé-Deschamps, Auxerre
Attendance: 11,000
Referee: António Almeida Marçal (Portugal)

Auxerre won 2–1 on aggregate.

26 September 1995
19:15

Standard Liège (Belgium)	0–0	(Portugal) Vitória de Guimarães
	Report

Stade Maurice Dufrasne, Liège
Attendance: 10,900
Referee: Leif Sundell (Sweden)

Vitória de Guimarães won 3–1 on aggregate.

26 September 1995
17:30

RAF Jelgava (Latvia)	1–2	(Moldova) Zimbru Chișinău
Zujevs 76'	Report	Gavriliuc 4', 25'

Daugava Stadium, Riga
Attendance: 1,000
Referee: Roy Helge Olsen (Norway)

Zimbru Chișinău won 3–1 on aggregate.

27 September 1995
17:30

Werder Bremen (Germany)	5–0	(Northern Ireland) Glenavon
Hobsch 26', 36', 39'; Basler 37' (pen.); Borowka 65'	Report

Weserstadion, Bremen
Attendance: 13,700
Referee: Alain Hamer (Luxembourg)

Werder Bremen won 7–0 on aggregate.

27 September 1995
18:00

Avenir Beggen (Luxembourg)	0–7	(France) Lens
	Report	Camara 22'; Meyrieu 26'; Boli 42'; Delmotte 53', 73'; Tiéhi 55', 71'

Stade rue Henri Dunant, Luxembourg
Attendance: 1,600
Referee: Terje Hauge (Norway)

Lens won 13–0 on aggregate.

28 September 1995
18:00

Bordeaux (France)	1–1	(North Macedonia) Vardar
Lizarazu 63' (pen.)	Report	Serafimovski 57'

Stade du Parc Lescure, Bordeaux
Attendance: 2,600
Referee: Leslie Irvine (Northern Ireland)

Bordeaux won 3–1 on aggregate.

28 September 1995
18:00

Újpest (Hungary)	0–2	(France) Strasbourg
	Report	Mostovoi 9'; Zitelli 77'

Megyeri úti Stadion, Budapest
Attendance: 2,750
Referee: Hartmut Strampe (Germany)

Strasbourg won 5–0 on aggregate.

== Second round ==
Team 1	Agg.	Team 2	1st leg	2nd leg
Kaiserslautern (Germany)	1–4	(Spain) Real Betis	1–3	0–1
Lugano (Switzerland)	1–3	(Czech Republic) Slavia Prague	1–2	0–1
Sparta Prague (Czech Republic)	6–3	(Moldova) Zimbru Chișinău	4–3	2–0
Auxerre (France)	0–1	(England) Nottingham Forest	0–1	0–0
Roma (Italy)	4–0	(Belgium) Eendracht Aalst	4–0	0–0
Brøndby (Denmark)	1–0	(England) Liverpool	0–0	1–0
Barcelona (Spain)	7–0	(Portugal) Vitória de Guimarães	3–0	4–0
Chornomorets Odesa (Ukraine)	0–4	(France) Lens	0–0	0–4
Bordeaux (France)	3–1	(Russia) Rotor Volgograd	2–1	1–0
Leeds United (England)	3–8	(Netherlands) PSV Eindhoven	3–5	0–3
Lyon (France)	4–1	(Italy) Lazio	2–1	2–0
Raith Rovers (Scotland)	1–4	(Germany) Bayern Munich	0–2	1–2
Strasbourg (France)	1–3	(Italy) Milan	0–1	1–2
Sevilla (Spain)	(a)2–2	(Greece) Olympiacos	1–0	1–2(aet)
Benfica (Portugal)	3–2	(Netherlands) Roda JC	1–0	2–2
Werder Bremen (Germany)	6–2	(Belarus) Dinamo Minsk	5–0	1–2

=== First leg ===
17 October 1995
20:30

Lugano (Switzerland)	1–2	(Czech Republic) Slavia Prague
Shalimov 84'	Report	Vágner 20'; Pěnička 25'

Stadio di Cornaredo, Lugano
Attendance: 8,000
Referee: Vítor Melo Pereira (Portugal)

17 October 1995

Sparta Prague (Czech Republic)	4–3	(Moldova) Zimbru Chișinău
Frýdek 23'; Nedvěd 45' (pen.), 57'; Budka 59'	Report	Suharev 56'; Testemițanu 62', 90' (pen.)

Stadion Letná, Prague
Attendance: 8,147
Referee: Mike Reed (England)

17 October 1995
19:15

Auxerre (France)	0–1	(England) Nottingham Forest
	Report	Stone 23'

Stade de l'Abbé-Deschamps, Auxerre
Attendance: 17,000
Referee: Pierluigi Collina (Italy)

17 October 1995
20:30

Roma (Italy)	4–0	(Belgium) Eendracht Aalst
Moriero 6'; Cappioli 51'; Balbo 69'; Totti 77'	Report

Stadio Olimpico, Rome
Attendance: 19,272
Referee: Sándor Varga (Hungary)

17 October 1995
20:05

Brøndby (Denmark)	0–0	(England) Liverpool
	Report

Parken Stadium, Copenhagen
Attendance: 37,648
Referee: Jaap Uilenberg (Netherlands)

17 October 1995
21:00

Barcelona (Spain)	3–0	(Portugal) Vitória de Guimarães
Kodro 44', 66'; Celades 76'	Report

Estadio del Futbol Club Barcelona, Barcelona
Attendance: 91,000
Referee: Alain Sars (France)

17 October 1995
16:15

Chornomorets Odesa (Ukraine)	0–0	(France) Lens
	Report

Central Stadium Chornomorets, Odesa
Attendance: 15,000
Referee: Theodoros Kefalas (Greece)

17 October 1995
20:30

Bordeaux (France)	2–1	(Russia) Rotor Volgograd
Histilloles 47'; Witschge 86' (pen.)	Report	Niederhaus 42'

Stade du Parc Lescure, Bordeaux
Attendance: 8,000
Referee: Zbigniew Przesmycki (Poland)

17 October 1995
21:00

Leeds United (England)	3–5	(Netherlands) PSV Eindhoven
Speed 6'; Palmer 48'; McAllister 72'	Report	Eijkelkamp 11'; Vink 35'; Jonk 39'; Nilis 83', 88'

Elland Road, Leeds
Attendance: 24,846
Referee: Antonio López Nieto (Spain)

17 October 1995
20:30

Lyon (France)	2–1	(Italy) Lazio
Devaux 15'; Deplace 64'	Report	Winter 24'

Stade de Gerland, Lyon
Attendance: 29,800
Referee: Markus Merk (Germany)

17 October 1995
19:00

Raith Rovers (Scotland)	0–2	(Germany) Bayern Munich
	Report	Klinsmann 6', 73'

Easter Road, Edinburgh
Attendance: 12,818
Referee: Rémi Harrel (France)

17 October 1995
21:00

Strasbourg (France)	0–1	(Italy) Milan
	Report	Simone 79'

Stade de la Meinau, Strasbourg
Attendance: 25,765
Referee: Jim McCluskey (Scotland)

17 October 1995
20:15

Sevilla (Spain)	1–0	(Greece) Olympiacos
Juanito 90'	Report

Estadio Ramón Sánchez-Pizjuán, Seville
Attendance: 22,000
Referee: Ion Crăciunescu (Romania)

17 October 1995
22:00

Benfica (Portugal)	1–0	(Netherlands) Roda JC
Panduru 78'	Report

Estádio da Luz, Lisbon
Attendance: 32,000
Referee: Periklis Vasilakis (Greece)

17 October 1995
20:15

Werder Bremen (Germany)	5–0	(Belarus) Dinamo Minsk
Shtanyuk 52' (o.g.); Basler 64', 83'; Hobsch 72'; Bode 88'	Report

Weserstadion, Bremen
Attendance: 16,500
Referee: Philippe Leduc (France)

18 October 1995
18:00

Kaiserslautern (Germany)	1–3	(Spain) Real Betis
Koch 46'	Report	Alfonso 45', 73'; Alexis 54'

Fritz-Walter-Stadion, Kaiserslautern
Attendance: 18,300
Referee: Charles Agius (Malta)

=== Second leg ===
31 October 1995
19:00

Slavia Prague (Czech Republic)	1–0	(Switzerland) Lugano
Šmicer 61'	Report

Stadion Eden, Prague
Attendance: 8,821
Referee: Loizos Loizou (Cyprus)

Slavia Prague won 3–1 on aggregate.

31 October 1995
16:30

Zimbru Chișinău (Moldova)	0–2	(Czech Republic) Sparta Prague
	Report	Koller 44'; Vonášek 63'

Stadionul Republican, Chișinău
Attendance: 22,000
Referee: Gerd Grabher (Austria)

Sparta Prague won 6–3 on aggregate.

31 October 1995
20:45

Nottingham Forest (England)	0–0	(France) Auxerre
	Report

City Ground, West Bridgford
Attendance: 28,063
Referee: Sergei Khusainov (Russia)

Nottingham Forest won 1–0 on aggregate.

31 October 1995
20:30

Eendracht Aalst (Belgium)	0–0	(Italy) Roma
	Report

Stade Constant Vanden Stock, Brussels
Attendance: 10,322
Referee: Karl-Erik Nilsson (Sweden)

Roma won 4–0 on aggregate.

31 October 1995
21:00

Liverpool (England)	0–1	(Denmark) Brøndby
	Report	Eggen 79'

Anfield, Liverpool
Attendance: 35,878
Referee: Karol Ihring (Slovakia)

Brøndby won 1–0 on aggregate.

31 October 1995
22:30

Vitória de Guimarães (Portugal)	0–4	(Spain) Barcelona
	Report	Kodro 18'; Óscar 61'; Celades 66'; Sergi 77'

Estádio D. Afonso Henriques, Guimarães
Attendance: 8,700
Referee: Hartmut Strampe (Germany)

Barcelona won 7–0 on aggregate.

31 October 1995
18:00

Rotor Volgograd (Russia)	0–1	(France) Bordeaux
	Report	Bancarel 83'

Central Stadium, Volgograd
Attendance: 10,000
Referee: Alfredo Trentalange (Italy)

Bordeaux won 3–1 on aggregate.

31 October 1995
20:30

PSV Eindhoven (Netherlands)	3–0	(England) Leeds United
Cocu 13', 75'; Pemberton 44' (o.g.)	Report

Philips Stadion, Eindhoven
Attendance: 26,900
Referee: Marc Batta (France)

PSV Eindhoven won 8–3 on aggregate.

31 October 1995
20:30

Lazio (Italy)	0–2	(France) Lyon
	Report	Maurice 21'; Assadourian 59'

Stadio Olimpico, Rome
Attendance: 40,340
Referee: Juan Ansuátegui Roca (Spain)

Lyon won 4–1 on aggregate.

31 October 1995
20:00

Bayern Munich (Germany)	2–1	(Scotland) Raith Rovers
Klinsmann 50'; Babbel 64'	Report	Lennon 43'

Olympiastadion, Munich
Attendance: 27,000
Referee: Vasyl Melnychuk (Ukraine)

Bayern Munich won 4–1 on aggregate.

31 October 1995
20:00

Olympiacos (Greece)	2–1 (a.e.t.)	(Spain) Sevilla
Sapanis 72'; Juskowiak 93' (pen.)	Report	Šuker 110'

Karaiskakis Stadium, Piraeus
Attendance: 33,000
Referee: Sándor Puhl (Hungary)

2–2 on aggregate. Sevilla won on away goals.

31 October 1995
18:00

Roda JC (Netherlands)	2–2	(Portugal) Benfica
D. Hesp 61'; Trost 74'	Report	Nader 87', 90'

Gemeentelijk Sportpark Kaalheide, Kerkrade
Attendance: 18,500
Referee: Serge Muhmenthaler (Switzerland)

Benfica won 3–2 on aggregate.

31 October 1995
17:30

Dinamo Minsk (Belarus)	2–1	(Germany) Werder Bremen
Khatskevich 76' (pen.); Shukanaw 90'	Report	Bode 26'

Dinamo Stadium, Minsk
Attendance: 8,000
Referee: Christer Fällström (Sweden)

Werder Bremen won 6–2 on aggregate.

1 November 1995
17:45

Real Betis (Spain)	1–0	(Germany) Kaiserslautern
Jarni 55'	Report

Estadio Benito Villamarín, Seville
Attendance: 35,000
Referee: Pierluigi Pairetto (Italy)

Real Betis won 4–1 on aggregate.

1 November 1995
17:30

Lens (France)	4–0	(Ukraine) Chornomorets Odesa
Meyrieu 13'; Vairelles 19'; Déhu 25'; Foé 77'	Report

Stade Félix-Bollaert, Lens
Attendance: 31,000
Referee: Leslie Irvine (Northern Ireland)

Lens won 4–0 on aggregate.

2 November 1995
20:45

Milan (Italy)	2–1	(France) Strasbourg
Baggio 28', 44' (pen.)	Report	Sauzée 45'

San Siro, Milan
Attendance: 13,652
Referee: Vassilios Nikakis (Greece)

Milan won 3–1 on aggregate.

== Third round ==
Team 1	Agg.	Team 2	1st leg	2nd leg
Milan (Italy)	2–0	(Czech Republic) Sparta Prague	2–0	0–0
Bayern Munich (Germany)	7–2	(Portugal) Benfica	4–1	3–1
Brøndby (Denmark)	3–4	(Italy) Roma	2–1	1–3
Bordeaux (France)	3–2	(Spain) Real Betis	2–0	1–2
Nottingham Forest (England)	1–0	(France) Lyon	1–0	0–0
PSV Eindhoven (Netherlands)	2–1	(Germany) Werder Bremen	2–1	0–0
Sevilla (Spain)	2–4	(Spain) Barcelona	1–1	1–3
Slavia Prague (Czech Republic)	1–0	(France) Lens	0–0	1–0 (aet)

=== First leg ===
21 November 1995
20:30

Bayern Munich (Germany)	4–1	(Portugal) Benfica
Klinsmann 26', 31', 44', 46'	Report	Dimas 30'

Olympiastadion, Munich
Attendance: 30,000
Referee: Dermot Gallagher (England)

21 November 1995
20:30

Brøndby (Denmark)	2–1	(Italy) Roma
Møller 45'; Bjur 76'	Report	Fonseca 17'

Brøndby Stadion, Brøndbyvester
Attendance: 28,379
Referee: Rémi Harrel (France)

21 November 1995
20:00

Bordeaux (France)	2–0	(Spain) Real Betis
Dutuel 24'; Croci 81'	Report

Stade du Parc Lescure, Bordeaux
Attendance: 18,000
Referee: Atanas Uzunov (Bulgaria)

21 November 1995
21:00

Nottingham Forest (England)	1–0	(France) Lyon
McGregor 83'	Report

City Ground, West Bridgford
Attendance: 22,141
Referee: Sándor Puhl (Hungary)

21 November 1995
18:30

PSV Eindhoven (Netherlands)	2–1	(Germany) Werder Bremen
Ronaldo 9' (pen.); Nilis 84'	Report	Bode 55'

Philips Stadion, Eindhoven
Attendance: 30,400
Referee: Ahmet Çakar (Turkey)

21 November 1995
22:00

Sevilla (Spain)	1–1	(Spain) Barcelona
Šuker 47'	Report	Hagi 65'

Estadio Ramón Sánchez-Pizjuán, Seville
Attendance: 42,000
Referee: Serge Muhmenthaler (Switzerland)

21 November 1995
18:00

Slavia Prague (Czech Republic)	0–0	(France) Lens
	Report

Stadion Eden, Prague
Attendance: 8,032
Referee: Günter Benkö (Austria)

23 November 1995
20:45

Milan (Italy)	2–0	(Czech Republic) Sparta Prague
Weah 33', 76'	Report

San Siro, Milan
Attendance: 12,758
Referee: Frans Van Den Wijngaert (Belgium)

=== Second leg ===
5 December 1995
22:45

Benfica (Portugal)	1–3	(Germany) Bayern Munich
Valdo 14'	Report	Klinsmann 32', 68'; Herzog 83'

Estádio da Luz, Lisbon
Attendance: 20,000
Referee: Peter Mikkelsen (Denmark)

Bayern Munich won 7–2 on aggregate.

5 December 1995
20:45

Roma (Italy)	3–1	(Denmark) Brøndby
Totti 22'; Balbo 72'; Carboni 90'	Report	Møller 84'

Stadio Olimpico, Rome
Attendance: 43,376
Referee: Bernd Heynemann (Germany)

Roma won 4–3 on aggregate.

5 December 1995
21:00

Lyon (France)	0–0	(England) Nottingham Forest
	Report

Stade de Gerland, Lyon
Attendance: 38,500
Referee: Mario van der Ende (Netherlands)

Nottingham Forest won 1–0 on aggregate.

5 December 1995
19:30

Werder Bremen (Germany)	0–0	(Netherlands) PSV Eindhoven
	Report

Weserstadion, Bremen
Attendance: 25,100
Referee: Alfredo Trentalange (Italy)

PSV Eindhoven won 2–1 on aggregate.

5 December 1995
21:00

Barcelona (Spain)	3–1	(Spain) Sevilla
Bakero 62'; Popescu 79'; Roger 82'	Report	Moya 80'

Estadio del Futbol Club Barcelona, Barcelona
Attendance: 68,000
Referee: Piero Ceccarini (Italy)

Barcelona won 4–2 on aggregate.

6 December 1995
17:30

Real Betis (Spain)	2–1	(France) Bordeaux
Alexis 28'; Stošić 45'	Report	Zidane 4'

Estadio Benito Villamarín, Seville
Attendance: 36,000
Referee: Rune Pedersen (Norway)

Bordeaux won 3–2 on aggregate.

7 December 1995
20:15

Sparta Prague (Czech Republic)	0–0	(Italy) Milan
	Report

Stadion Letná, Prague
Attendance: 17,200
Referee: Antonio López Nieto (Spain)

Milan won 2–0 on aggregate.

7 December 1995
20:00

Lens (France)	0–1 (a.e.t.)	(Czech Republic) Slavia Prague
	Report	Poborský 96'

Stade Félix-Bollaert, Lens
Attendance: 27,680
Referee: Ryszard Wójcik (Poland)

Slavia Prague won 1–0 on aggregate.

== Quarter-finals ==
Team 1	Agg.	Team 2	1st leg	2nd leg
Milan (Italy)	2–3	(France) Bordeaux	2–0	0–3
Bayern Munich (Germany)	7–2	(England) Nottingham Forest	2–1	5–1
Barcelona (Spain)	5–4	(Netherlands) PSV Eindhoven	2–2	3–2
Slavia Prague (Czech Republic)	(a)3–3	(Italy) Roma	2–0	1–3 (aet)

=== First leg ===
5 March 1996
20:45

Milan (Italy)	2–0	(France) Bordeaux
Eranio 29'; Baggio 74'	Report

San Siro, Milan
Attendance: 22,740
Referee: Vadzim Zhuk (Belarus)

5 March 1996
20:15

Bayern Munich (Germany)	2–1	(England) Nottingham Forest
Klinsmann 16'; Scholl 44'	Report	Chettle 17'

Olympiastadion, Munich
Attendance: 38,000
Referee: Antonio López Nieto (Spain)

5 March 1996
21:00

Barcelona (Spain)	2–2	(Netherlands) PSV Eindhoven
Bakero 21'; Abelardo 70'	Report	Nilis 4', 50'

Estadio del Futbol Club Barcelona, Barcelona
Attendance: 90,000
Referee: Anders Frisk (Sweden)

5 March 1996
20:30

Slavia Prague (Czech Republic)	2–0	(Italy) Roma
Poborský 10'; Vágner 50'	Report

Stadion Eden, Prague
Attendance: 14,372
Referee: Leslie Mottram (Scotland)

=== Second leg ===
19 March 1996
20:30

Bordeaux (France)	3–0	(Italy) Milan
Tholot 14'; Dugarry 64', 70'	Report

Stade du Parc Lescure, Bordeaux
Attendance: 32,500
Referee: Ahmet Çakar (Turkey)

Bordeaux won 3–2 on aggregate.

19 March 1996
21:00

Nottingham Forest (England)	1–5	(Germany) Bayern Munich
Stone 85'	Report	Ziege 30'; Strunz 43'; Klinsmann 64', 79'; Papin 72'

City Ground, West Bridgford
Attendance: 28,800
Referee: Piero Ceccarini (Italy)

Bayern Munich won 7–2 on aggregate.

19 March 1996
20:30

PSV Eindhoven (Netherlands)	2–3	(Spain) Barcelona
Zenden 44'; Eijkelkamp 65'	Report	Bakero 4'; Figo 23'; Sergi 80'

Philips Stadion, Eindhoven
Attendance: 29,050
Referee: Nikolai Levnikov (Russia)

Barcelona won 5–4 on aggregate.

19 March 1996
20:30

Roma (Italy)	3–1 (a.e.t.)	(Czech Republic) Slavia Prague
Moriero 60', 99'; Giannini 82'	Report	Vávra 112'

Stadio Olimpico, Rome
Attendance: 63,859
Referee: Atanas Uzunov (Bulgaria)

3–3 on aggregate. Slavia Prague won on away goals.

== Semi-finals ==
Team 1	Agg.	Team 2	1st leg	2nd leg
Bayern Munich (Germany)	4–3	(Spain) Barcelona	2–2	2–1
Slavia Prague (Czech Republic)	0–2	(France) Bordeaux	0–1	0–1

=== First leg ===
2 April 1996
20:15

Bayern Munich (Germany)	2–2	(Spain) Barcelona
Witeczek 52'; Scholl 57'	Report	Óscar 14'; Hagi 77'

Olympiastadion, Munich
Attendance: 63,000
Referee: Michel Piraux (Belgium)

2 April 1996
20:30

Slavia Prague (Czech Republic)	0–1	(France) Bordeaux
	Report	Dugarry 8'

Stadion Evžena Rošického, Prague
Attendance: 17,523
Referee: Mario van der Ende (Netherlands)

=== Second leg ===
16 April 1996
21:00

Barcelona (Spain)	1–2	(Germany) Bayern Munich
De la Peña 88'	Report	Babbel 39'; Witeczek 83'

Estadio del Futbol Club Barcelona, Barcelona
Attendance: 115,000
Referee: Atanas Uzunov (Bulgaria)

Bayern Munich won 4–3 on aggregate.

16 April 1996
20:30

Bordeaux (France)	1–0	(Czech Republic) Slavia Prague
Tholot 47'	Report

Stade du Parc Lescure, Bordeaux
Attendance: 31,500
Referee: Vassilios Nikakis (Greece)

Bordeaux won 2–0 on aggregate.

== Final ==
=== First leg ===
1 May 1996
20:00

Bayern Munich (Germany)	2–0	(France) Bordeaux
Helmer 34'; Scholl 60'	Report

Olympiastadion, Munich
Attendance: 63,000
Referee: Serge Muhmenthaler (Switzerland)

=== Second leg ===
15 May 1996
20:45

Bordeaux (France)	1–3	(Germany) Bayern Munich
Dutuel 75'	Report	Scholl 53'; Kostadinov 66'; Klinsmann 77'

Stade du Parc Lescure, Bordeaux
Attendance: 36,000
Referee: Vadzim Zhuk (Belarus)

Bayern Munich won 5–1 on aggregate.

== Top scorers ==
The top scorers from the 1995–96 UEFA Cup are as follows:

Rank	Name	Team	Goals
1	(Germany) Jürgen Klinsmann	(Germany) Bayern Munich	15
2	(Brazil) Ronaldo	(Netherlands) PSV Eindhoven	6
3	(Belgium) Luc Nilis	(Netherlands) PSV Eindhoven	5
3	(Czech Republic) Pavel Nedvěd	(Czech Republic) Sparta Prague	5
3	(Germany) Mehmet Scholl	(Germany) Bayern Munich	5
6	(Argentina) Abel Balbo	(Italy) Roma	4
6	(Italy) Pierluigi Casiraghi	(Italy) Lazio	4
6	(Germany) Bernd Hobsch	(Germany) Werder Bremen	4
6	(Northern Ireland) Danny Lennon	(Scotland) Raith Rovers	4
6	(Denmark) Peter Møller	(Denmark) Brøndby	4
6	(Spain) Roger	(Spain) Barcelona	4
6	(Croatia) Davor Šuker	(Spain) Sevilla	4
6	(Ivory Coast) Joël Tiéhi	(France) Lens	4

== See also ==
- 1995–96 UEFA Champions League
- 1995–96 UEFA Cup Winners' Cup
- 1995 UEFA Intertoto Cup
