= Bogon =

Bogon may refer to:

== Places ==
- Bogon, Kale, a village in western Burma
- Bogon, Shwegu, a village in north-eastern Burma
- Bogon Islet, a South Pacific islet in the Enewetak Atoll

== Other uses ==
- Bogon filtering, the filtering of bogus IP addresses (bogon space)
- Bogon (fictional elementary particle)

== See also ==
- Bogong moth
- Bogus (disambiguation)
- Bogo (disambiguation)
- Fake (disambiguation)
- BogoMips, an unscientific measurement of CPU speed made by the Linux kernel
- Bogosort, a particularly ineffective sorting algorithm
- Bogan (sometimes pronounced bogon) an Australian and New Zealand slang word
