= Bogo =

Bogo or BOGO may refer to:

- Bogø, a Danish island in the Baltic Sea
- Bogo, Cebu, a city in Cebu, Philippines
- Bogo, Cameroon, a commune in Cameroon
- BogoMIPS, an unreliable CPU speed test used by Linux
- Bogo people, in Eritrea
  - Bogo language
- BOGO or BOGOF, an initialism for buy one, get one free, a common form of sales promotion
- Bogo, Sežana, a village in southwestern Slovenia
- Bogosort, a highly inefficient sorting algorithm
- Chief Bogo, a character in the 2016 Walt Disney film Zootopia

== See also ==
- Bogey (disambiguation)
- Bogus (disambiguation)
