= Bogus =

Bogus may refer to:

== Entertainment and media ==
- Bogus (film), a 1996 film starring Whoopi Goldberg
- Bogus (game), alternative name of the dice game Dice 10000
- Mr. Bogus, a 1992 animated television series

== Other ==
- Bogus (surname)
- Bogus Basin mountain resort in Idaho
- Bogus (Ruby), application for testing computer code

== See also ==
- Bogon (disambiguation)
- BogoMips
- Bogosort
- Counterfeit
- Fake (disambiguation)
- Misinformation
