= 1996–97 Toto Cup Leumit =

Toto Cup Leumit
- Season: 1996–97
- Champions: Bnei Yehuda (2nd title)

The 1996–97 Toto Cup Leumit was the 13th season of the third most important football tournament in Israel since its introduction.

It was held in two stages. First, the 16 Liga Leumit teams were divided into four groups. The group winners advanced to the semi-finals, which, as was the final, were held as one-legged matches.

The competition was won by Bnei Yehuda, who had beaten Hapoel Haifa 3–0 in the final.

== Group stage ==
=== Group A ===
| Pos | Team | Pld | W | D | L | GF | GA | GD | Pts | MTA | HTA | HTZ | HRL |
|---|---|---|---|---|---|---|---|---|---|---|---|---|---|
| 1 | Maccabi Tel Aviv (A) | 6 | 4 | 0 | 2 | 15 | 6 | +9 | 12 | — | 1–3 | 4–0 | 3–0 |
| 2 | Hapoel Tel Aviv | 6 | 3 | 2 | 1 | 9 | 8 | +1 | 11 | 0–3 | — | 3–2 | 0–0 |
| 3 | Hapoel Tzafririm Holon | 6 | 2 | 1 | 3 | 8 | 13 | −5 | 7 | 2–1 | 1–1 | — | 3–1 |
| 4 | Hapoel Rishon LeZion | 6 | 1 | 1 | 4 | 6 | 11 | −5 | 4 | 1–3 | 1–2 | 3–0 | — |

Source: WikiHapoel (in Hebrew); Maccabi Tel Aviv (in Hebrew)
Rules for classification: 1st points; 2nd goal difference; 3rd matches won; 4th goals scored; 5th head-to-head; 6th decision match
(A) Advanced to semifinal

=== Group B ===
| Pos | Team | Pld | W | D | L | GF | GA | GD | Pts | MHA | HBS | HBN | MPT |
|---|---|---|---|---|---|---|---|---|---|---|---|---|---|
| 1 | Maccabi Haifa (A) | 6 | 3 | 2 | 1 | 10 | 7 | +3 | 11 | — | 1–2 | 0–0 | 1–0 |
| 2 | Hapoel Be'er Sheva | 6 | 2 | 2 | 2 | 10 | 9 | +1 | 8 | 1–3 | — | 3–0 | 1–1 |
| 3 | Hapoel Beit She'an | 6 | 2 | 1 | 3 | 7 | 10 | −3 | 7 | 3–4 | 1–0 | — | 2–1 |
| 4 | Maccabi Petah Tikva | 6 | 1 | 1 | 4 | 6 | 11 | −5 | 4 | 1–1 | 3–3 | 2–1 | — |

Source: Maccabi Haifa (in Hebrew)
Rules for classification: 1st points; 2nd goal difference; 3rd matches won; 4th goals scored; 5th head-to-head; 6th decision match
(A) Advanced to semifinal

=== Group C ===
| Pos | Team | Pld | W | D | L | GF | GA | GD | Pts | BnY | BEI | MHE | HTY |
|---|---|---|---|---|---|---|---|---|---|---|---|---|---|
| 1 | Bnei Yehuda (A) | 6 | 3 | 3 | 0 | 17 | 9 | +8 | 12 | — | 2–2 | 2–2 | 3–0 |
| 2 | Beitar Jerusalem | 6 | 3 | 3 | 0 | 9 | 6 | +3 | 12 | 2–2 | — | 2–1 | 0–0 |
| 3 | Maccabi Herzliya | 6 | 2 | 1 | 3 | 14 | 12 | +2 | 7 | 2–4 | 1–2 | — | 4–1 |
| 4 | Hapoel Tayibe | 6 | 0 | 1 | 5 | 3 | 16 | −13 | 1 | 1–4 | 0–1 | 1–4 | — |

Source: Bnei Yehuda Museum (in Hebrew)
Rules for classification: 1st points; 2nd goal difference; 3rd matches won; 4th goals scored; 5th head-to-head; 6th decision match
(A) Advanced to semifinal

=== Group D ===
| Pos | Team | Pld | W | D | L | GF | GA | GD | Pts | HHA | HKS | HJE | HPT |
|---|---|---|---|---|---|---|---|---|---|---|---|---|---|
| 1 | Hapoel Haifa (A) | 6 | 3 | 2 | 1 | 21 | 8 | +13 | 11 | — | 6–0 | 5–0 | 3–0 |
| 2 | Hapoel Kfar Saba | 6 | 3 | 2 | 1 | 9 | 11 | −2 | 11 | 2–2 | — | 2–0 | 1–1 |
| 3 | Hapoel Jerusalem | 6 | 2 | 1 | 3 | 7 | 12 | −5 | 7 | 2–1 | 1–2 | — | 2–2 |
| 4 | Hapoel Petah Tikva | 6 | 0 | 3 | 3 | 8 | 14 | −6 | 3 | 4–4 | 1–2 | 0–2 | — |

Source: hpt.co.il (in Hebrew); hpt.co.il (in Hebrew); Hapoel Kfar Saba (in Hebrew)
Rules for classification: 1st points; 2nd goal difference; 3rd matches won; 4th goals scored; 5th head-to-head; 6th decision match
(A) Advanced to semifinal

== Elimination rounds ==
=== Semifinals ===
| 11 February 1997 | Maccabi Tel Aviv | 0–1 | Bnei Yehuda | Ramat Gan |
| | | Report (in Hebrew) | Avigdor 11' (pen.) | Stadium: Ramat Gan Stadium; Attendance: 900; Referee: Danny Koren |

| 11 February 1997 | Maccabi Haifa | 1–2 | Hapoel Haifa | Haifa |
| | Glam 63' | Maccabi Haifa (in Hebrew) | Shitrit 56'; Banin 84' (pen.) | Stadium: Kiryat Eliezer Stadium; Attendance: 6000; Referee: Meir Levi |

=== Final ===
18 February 1997

| Bnei Yehuda | 3–0 | Hapoel Haifa |
|---|---|---|
| Tikva 16', 63'; Mizrahi 55' | Bnei Yehuda Museum (in Hebrew) |

Ramat Gan Stadium
Attendance: 3000
Referee: Haim Lefkovich

== See also ==
- 1996–97 Toto Cup Artzit
