= Budka =

Budka is a Polish surname. Notable people with this surname include:

- Adrian Budka (born 1980), Polish football player
- Borys Budka (born 1978), Polish politician
- Frank Budka (born 1942), American football player
- Nykyta Budka (1877–1949), Ukrainian clergyman
- Ryszard Budka (1935–2025), Polish footballer
- Václav Budka (born 1969), Czech football player
