= Bogus (surname) =

Bogus is a surname. Notable people with the surname include:

- Adelina Boguș (born 1988), Romanian rower
- Carl Bogus (born 1948), American legal scholar
- Liz Bogus (born 1984), American soccer player
- Marcin Boguś (born 1973), Polish footballer

== See also ==
- Bogguss
