= 1993–94 Liga Leumit =

Liga Leumit
- Season: 1993–94
- Champions: Maccabi Haifa; 4th title
- Relegated: Hapoel Kfar Saba
- Top goalscorer: Alon Mizrahi (28)

The 1993–94 Liga Leumit season began on 28 August 1993 and ended on 4 June 1994, with Maccabi Haifa winning their fifth title.

That season saw one of the best teams in history of Israeli football, according to many pundits, when Maccabi Haifa won the league without suffering a single loss, breaking many Israeli records in the process.

In that season (as well as in the previous season) it was decided that three teams will be promoted from Liga Artzit and one relegated from Liga Leumit. The fourth place in Liga Artzit would play against before last (13th) place in Liga Leumit in a Playoff to see which team is to play in the premier league.

The three teams from Liga Artzit that were promoted at the end of the previous season: Maccabi Herzliya, Maccabi Ironi Ashdod and Hapoel Kfar Saba. The team relegated was Beitar Tel Aviv.

== Final table ==
| Pos | Team | Pld | W | D | L | GF | GA | GD | Pts | Qualification or relegation |
|---|---|---|---|---|---|---|---|---|---|---|
| 1 | Maccabi Haifa (C) | 39 | 28 | 11 | 0 | 97 | 27 | +70 | 95 | Qualification for the Champions League qualifying round |
| 2 | Maccabi Tel Aviv | 39 | 27 | 7 | 5 | 80 | 36 | +44 | 88 | Qualification for the Cup Winners' Cup qualifying round (Note: Since Maccabi Tel Aviv won the Israeli State Cup, then the 3rd-positioned team awarded with entry to the 1994–1995 UEFA Cup.) |
| 3 | Hapoel Be'er Sheva | 39 | 18 | 11 | 10 | 54 | 38 | +16 | 65 | Qualification for the UEFA Cup preliminary round |
| 4 | Beitar Jerusalem | 39 | 19 | 7 | 13 | 75 | 66 | +9 | 64 | |
| 5 | Hapoel Tel Aviv | 39 | 16 | 6 | 17 | 61 | 59 | +2 | 54 | |
| 6 | Maccabi Netanya | 39 | 13 | 10 | 16 | 64 | 71 | −7 | 49 | |
| 7 | Hapoel Petah Tikva | 39 | 12 | 12 | 15 | 53 | 56 | −3 | 48 | |
| 8 | Maccabi Petah Tikva | 39 | 11 | 14 | 14 | 37 | 46 | −9 | 47 | |
| 9 | Bnei Yehuda | 39 | 13 | 8 | 18 | 55 | 67 | −12 | 47 | |
| 10 | Tzafririm Holon | 39 | 11 | 12 | 16 | 43 | 68 | −25 | 45 | |
| 11 | Maccabi Herzliya | 39 | 10 | 11 | 18 | 41 | 53 | −12 | 41 | |
| 12 | Maccabi Ironi Ashdod | 39 | 9 | 11 | 19 | 53 | 57 | −4 | 38 | |
| 13 | Hapoel Haifa (O) | 39 | 7 | 13 | 19 | 39 | 80 | −41 | 34 | Qualification for the relegation play-offs |
| 14 | Hapoel Kfar Saba (R) | 39 | 7 | 11 | 21 | 36 | 64 | −28 | 32 | Relegation to Liga Artzit |

Source: rsssf.com
(C) Champions; (O) Play-off winners; (R) Relegated

== Results ==
=== First and second round ===
| Home \ Away | BEI | BnY | HBS | HHA | HKS | HPT | HTA | MHA | MHE | MIA | MNE | MPT | MTA | TZH |
|---|---|---|---|---|---|---|---|---|---|---|---|---|---|---|
| Beitar Jerusalem | — | 2–1 | 0–2 | 3–1 | 3–2 | 3–0 | 1–0 | 2–3 | 2–2 | 2–0 | 1–1 | 3–1 | 0–1 | 4–2 |
| Bnei Yehuda | 3–1 | — | 0–4 | 3–1 | 3–1 | 0–1 | 4–0 | 0–3 | 0–1 | 0–2 | 1–1 | 0–1 | 2–0 | 1–0 |
| Hapoel Be'er Sheva | 2–3 | 0–1 | — | 2–1 | 1–0 | 3–1 | 3–1 | 0–2 | 1–1 | 0–0 | 2–1 | 3–0 | 0–3 | 1–1 |
| Hapoel Haifa | 1–1 | 0–0 | 1–3 | — | 0–2 | 1–1 | 2–3 | 0–0 | 0–1 | 0–7 | 0–0 | 0–0 | 0–7 | 3–1 |
| Hapoel Kfar Saba | 1–1 | 1–0 | 0–2 | 2–0 | — | 1–1 | 0–3 | 1–1 | 0–1 | 0–0 | 1–0 | 1–1 | 1–2 | 1–4 |
| Hapoel Petah Tikva | 1–1 | 1–2 | 0–1 | 4–0 | 2–1 | — | 3–1 | 1–3 | 3–0 | 3–1 | 3–0 | 1–1 | 1–2 | 0–0 |
| Hapoel Tel Aviv | 0–4 | 2–0 | 1–3 | 0–2 | 3–0 | 2–0 | — | 0–1 | 1–1 | 2–2 | 3–1 | 2–1 | 1–2 | 2–3 |
| Maccabi Haifa | 4–0 | 5–1 | 2–1 | 4–0 | 0–0 | 2–1 | 2–1 | — | 1–0 | 2–1 | 4–2 | 4–0 | 5–0 | 5–0 |
| Maccabi Herzliya | 0–2 | 2–1 | 2–3 | 1–1 | 2–2 | 2–0 | 1–3 | 0–2 | — | 0–0 | 2–1 | 0–0 | 1–2 | 0–2 |
| Maccabi Ironi Ashdod | 0–2 | 6–0 | 0–1 | 2–1 | 0–2 | 1–1 | 1–2 | 1–3 | 0–3 | — | 5–1 | 1–0 | 2–5 | 1–1 |
| Maccabi Netanya | 1–5 | 2–0 | 1–1 | 7–1 | 3–0 | 2–2 | 1–3 | 2–2 | 4–3 | 3–2 | — | 4–1 | 1–3 | 2–0 |
| Maccabi Petah Tikva | 1–0 | 1–1 | 0–0 | 0–0 | 4–0 | 0–1 | 3–0 | 0–1 | 0–1 | 1–0 | 1–2 | — | 1–1 | 1–0 |
| Maccabi Tel Aviv | 2–3 | 5–1 | 2–0 | 3–0 | 2–1 | 2–1 | 1–0 | 1–1 | 1–0 | 1–0 | 1–0 | 4–0 | — | 6–0 |
| Tzafririm Holon | 5–1 | 1–1 | 1–1 | 0–0 | 2–1 | 3–1 | 1–1 | 0–0 | 1–0 | 2–0 | 1–2 | 1–1 | 0–0 | — |

Legend: Blue = home team win; Yellow = draw; Red = away team win.

=== Third round ===
| Home \ Away | BEI | BnY | HBS | HHA | HKS | HPT | HTA | MHA | MHE | MIA | MNE | MPT | MTA | TZH |
|---|---|---|---|---|---|---|---|---|---|---|---|---|---|---|
| Beitar Jerusalem | — | — | — | 1–3 | 1–0 | — | 1–1 | — | 1–0 | — | — | 1–2 | 1–2 | 6–1 |
| Bnei Yehuda | 8–2 | — | — | — | 2–2 | 1–3 | — | — | — | — | 4–2 | 3–1 | 2–2 | — |
| Hapoel Be'er Sheva | 1–3 | 3–0 | — | 0–0 | — | 2–1 | — | 2–2 | — | 3–1 | 0–0 | — | — | — |
| Hapoel Haifa | — | 1–1 | — | — | 4–3 | 2–1 | — | — | 1–3 | 1–1 | — | 1–2 | — | — |
| Hapoel Kfar Saba | — | — | 2–0 | — | — | — | 1–4 | 1–4 | 2–0 | — | — | 0–0 | — | 1–2 |
| Hapoel Petah Tikva | 3–3 | — | — | — | 1–1 | — | — | — | 0–0 | — | 4–2 | 0–0 | 2–1 | — |
| Hapoel Tel Aviv | — | 2–0 | 0–1 | 1–4 | — | 0–0 | — | 2–3 | — | 5–2 | — | — | — | 4–0 |
| Maccabi Haifa | 5–1 | 1–0 | — | 6–1 | — | 6–0 | — | — | — | 1–1 | 1–1 | — | 1–1 | — |
| Maccabi Herzliya | — | 2–2 | 2–2 | — | — | — | 0–1 | 1–3 | — | 0–0 | — | — | — | 5–1 |
| Maccabi Ironi Ashdod | 1–3 | 1–3 | — | — | 0–0 | 2–0 | — | — | — | — | 4–1 | — | 0–2 | — |
| Maccabi Netanya | 2–1 | — | — | 1–1 | 3–1 | — | 3–2 | — | 2–0 | — | — | 1–1 | 1–2 | — |
| Maccabi Petah Tikva | — | — | 1–0 | — | — | — | 1–2 | 1–1 | 3–0 | 0–5 | — | — | — | 4–0 |
| Maccabi Tel Aviv | — | — | 1–0 | 3–2 | 2–0 | — | 0–0 | — | 2–1 | — | — | 1–1 | — | 2–3 |
| Tzafririm Holon | — | 1–3 | 0–0 | 0–2 | — | 1–4 | — | 0–1 | — | 0–0 | 2–0 | — | — | — |

Legend: Blue = home team win; Yellow = draw; Red = away team win.

== Promotion-relegation play-off ==
A promotion-relegation play-off between the 13th-placed team in Liga Leumit, Hapoel Haifa, and the 4th team in Liga Artzit, Shimshon Tel Aviv.

11 June 1994

| Hapoel Haifa | 0 – 1 | Shimshon Tel Aviv |

Kiryat Eliezer, Haifa
18 June 1994

| Shimshon Tel Aviv | 0 – 3 | Hapoel Haifa |

Ramat Gan Stadium, Ramat Gan

Hapoel Haifa won 3–1 on aggregate and remained in Liga Leumit.

== Top scorers ==
| Rank | Player | Club | Goals |
|---|---|---|---|
| 1 | (Israel) Alon Mizrahi | Maccabi Haifa | 28 |
| 2 | (Israel) Itzik Zohar | Maccabi Tel Aviv | 22 |
| 3 | (Israel) Motti Kakoun | Hapoel Petah Tikva | 21 |
| 4 | (Ukraine) Nikolay Kodritski | Bnei Yehuda | 20 |
| 5 | (Russia) Vladimir Grechnyov | Beitar Jerusalem | 19 |
| 6 | (Israel) Amir Turgeman | Maccabi Ironi Ashdod | 17 |
| 7 | (Israel) Amir Avigdor | Hapoel Be'er Sheva | 16 |
| 7 | (Israel) Eli Ohana | Beitar Jerusalem | 16 |
| 9 | (Israel) Ronen Harazi | Beitar Jerusalem | 15 |
| 9 | (Russia) Roman Filipchuk | Maccabi Netanya | 13 |
