= Lubin Stadium =

Football stadium located in Lubin, Poland

Coordinates: 51°24′50″N 16°11′54″E

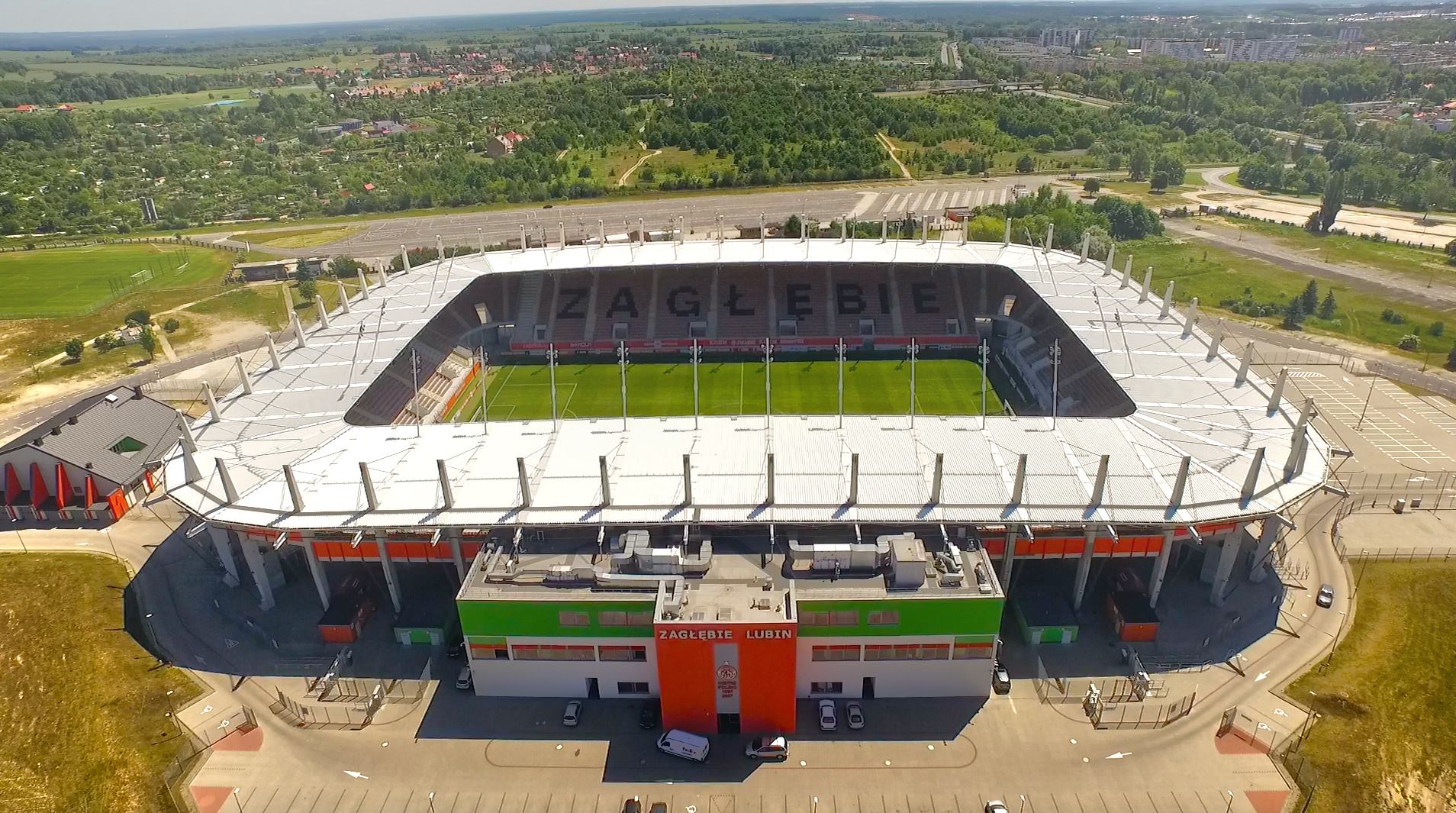
- Interactive map of Lubin Stadium
- Full name: KGHM Zagłębie Arena
- Former names: Dialog Arena (14 March 2009 - 30 January 2012)
- Location: ul. Marii Skłodowskiej-Curie 98 59-300 Lubin, Poland
- Owner: City of Lubin
- Operator: Zagłębie Lubin
- Capacity: 16,068
- Surface: Field (Grass)
- Record attendance: 16,033 Zagłębie - Lech (15 March 2026)
- Field size: 105 m × 68 m (344 ft × 223 ft)

Construction
- Groundbreaking: 2007
- Built: 2007–2010
- Opened: 14 March 2009
- Cost: 130 mln Złotych
- Architect: Bremer AG

Tenant
- Zagłębie Lubin (2009–present)

Website
- www.zaglebie.com

The Lubin Stadium (Polish: Stadion w Lubinie), branded as KGHM Zagłębie Arena for sponsorship reasons, is a football stadium located in Lubin, Poland. It is the home ground of Zagłębie Lubin. The stadium holds 16,068 people.

The old multi-use stadium was built on 22 July 1985 with a capacity of 35,000. Construction of a new stadium started on 18 September 2007. Zagłębie played its first official match in the new stadium on 14 March 2009 against Górnik Łęczna. Only three stands were opened. The main stand was finished in 2010.

== Stadium characteristic ==
The new stadium was built in the same place where the old stadium was located. Its construction began on September 18, 2007. Stands of the old stadium opened in 1985 were created on artificial hills. The large part (about 65%) of them, was demolished in the early stage of construction. The playing ground has been moved nearly 20 meters compared to the old stadium. Stadion Miejski is not the modernization of the old facility – it has been completely built from scratch.

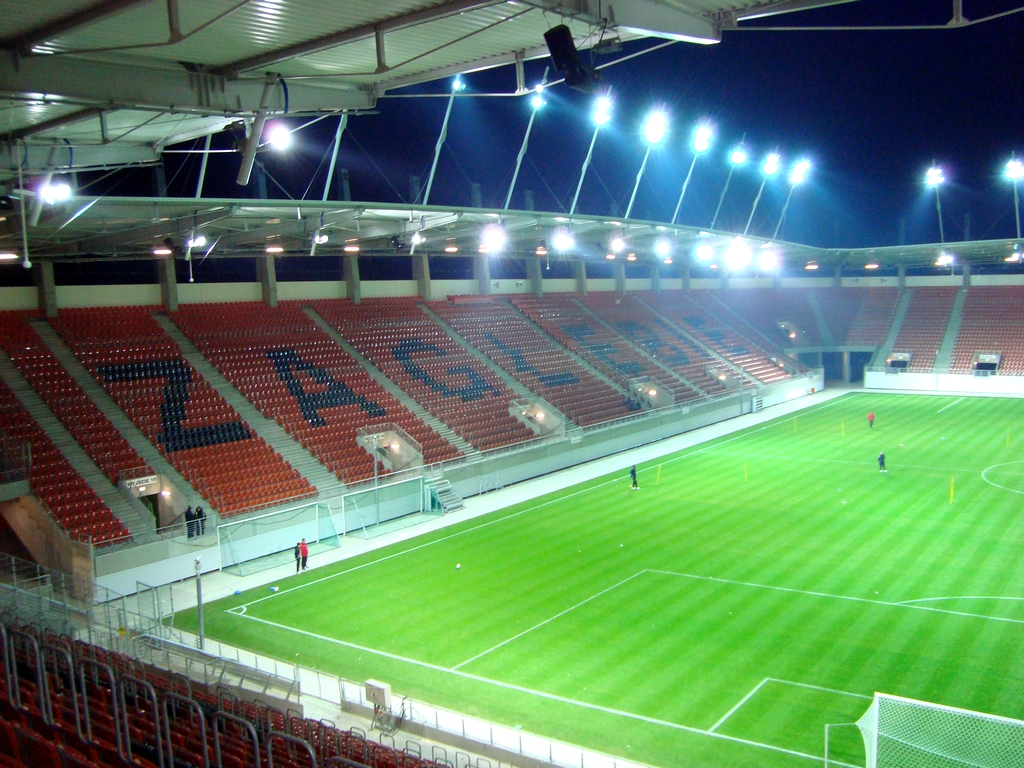
The Stadion Miejski at night

Construction of the new stadium took place in two stages. First stage provided for the construction of three stand was completed in early 2009. In the second stage the main stand was built, with the press center and VIP section. Construction cost per single chair was about 1817.5 €.

The new stadium meets the criteria for Category UEFA stadium 3. For watching matches in luxurious conditions conducive to the distance separating the stands from the pitch - 5.5 meters. The advantages of the new stadium are also one-level stands, which affect the quality of doping. Their height is 14 feet. All seats are covered. Steel roof structure is supported by 52 concrete pillars, the weight of each is 24 tons. The stadium is lit by 150 floodlights, whose total illuminance is 2000 lux, enabling broadcasting of matches in High Definition.

On the main stand, the press center was established, which includes a conference room, a press center, two TV studios, 10 tables for the press, 10 desktops with 3 seats for television and radio commentator, and platforms for the cameras. Also, on the main stand is located 600 VIP category seats and 100 SuperVIP seats. Moreover, there are 32 places for disabled persons.

== Naming rights ==
The naming rights to the stadium was sold to Polish telecommunications company Telefonia Dialog. The official contract was signed at 3 February 2009. From then until February 2012, the stadium was known as the "Dialog Arena". From February 2012 stadium returned to its original standard names, as Stadion Zagłębia Lubin (Zagłębie Lubin Stadium) and Stadion w Lubinie (Stadium in Lubin). On 7 October 2023 naming rights to the stadium was sold again to Polish multinational mining corporation KGHM Polska Miedź. From that moment, the commercial name of the stadium is "KGHM Zagłebie Arena".

== Matches of the Poland national team ==
So far, Poland national football team has played only 1 match on the Zagłębie Lubin Stadium (Dialog Arena - during this match).

Nr	Competition	Date	Opponent	Attendance	Result	Scorers for Poland
1	Friendly	10 August 2011	Georgia	12310	1:0 (1:0)	Jakub Błaszczykowski

== See also ==
- List of football stadiums in Poland
