= Oleksandr Kozakevych =

Ukrainian footballer

Personal information
- Date of birth: 9 August 1975 (age 51)
- Place of birth: Odesa, Ukrainian SSR
- Position: Forward

Senior career*
Years	Team	Apps	(Gls)
1992–1994	Chornomorets-2 Odesa	90	(23)
1994–1995	SC Odesa	38	(9)
1995–1998	Chornomorets Odesa	69	(5)
1999–2000	Polissya Zhytomyr	51	(13)
2000–2003	Oleksandriya	28	(6)
2001	→ Zirka Kirovohrad (loan)	3	(0)
2003–2004	Nyva Vinnytsia	25	(5)
2004	Oleksandriya	10	(0)
2005–2006	Dnister Ovidiopol	24	(5)
- * Club domestic league appearances and goals

Oleksandr Kozakevych (born 9 August 1975) is a retired Ukrainian football striker.
