= Emil Šterbal =

Slovenian footballer

Personal information
- Full name: Emil Šterbal
- Date of birth: 15 June 1970 (age 56)
- Place of birth: SFR Yugoslavia
- Position: Defender

Senior career*
Years	Team	Apps	(Gls)
1991–1999	Maribor	203	(2)
1999–2000	AA Gent	21	(0)
2001	Siirt Jetpaspor	3	(0)
2002–2008	Drava Ptuj	143	(0)
2008–2009	Zavrč		
- * Club domestic league appearances and goals

Emil Šterbal (born 15 June 1970) is a Slovene retired football player, who played as a defender.

During most of his playing career Šterbal played in the Slovenian PrvaLiga and made a total of 330 league appearances for Maribor (203) and Drava Ptuj (127). He also scored two league goals; both while a member of Maribor.

In 2024, Šterbal began as a coach for the NK Malečnik.
