= Wojciech Rudy =

Polish footballer (born 1952)

Personal information
- Full name: Wojciech Rudy
- Date of birth: 24 October 1952 (age 74)
- Place of birth: Katowice, Poland
- Height: 1.75 m (5 ft 9 in)
- Position: Midfielder

Youth career
- Gwardia Katowice

Senior career*
Years	Team	Apps	(Gls)
1970–1983	Zagłębie Sosnowiec	272	(13)
1983–1984	Kuopion Palloseura		(4)
1984–1985	Zagłębie Sosnowiec	3	(0)

International career
1974–1981	Poland	40	(1)
Medal record
Men's football
Representing Poland
Olympic Games
Silver medal – second place	1976 Montréal	Team
- * Club domestic league appearances and goals

Wojciech Władysław Rudy (born 24 October 1952) is a Polish former professional footballer who played as a midfielder. He played mostly for Zagłębie Sosnowiec.

He played for the Poland national team, making 40 appearances and scoring once, and was a participant at the 1978 FIFA World Cup, as well as the 1976 Summer Olympics, where Poland won the silver medal. In 1979, he won the Polish Footballer of the Year Award presented by the Piłka Nożna football weekly.

== Honours ==
Zagłębie Sosnowiec

- Polish Cup: 1976–77, 1977–78

Poland

- Olympic silver medal: 1976

Individual

- Piłka Nożna Polish Footballer of the Year: 1979
