= Bogo, Sežana =

Bogo
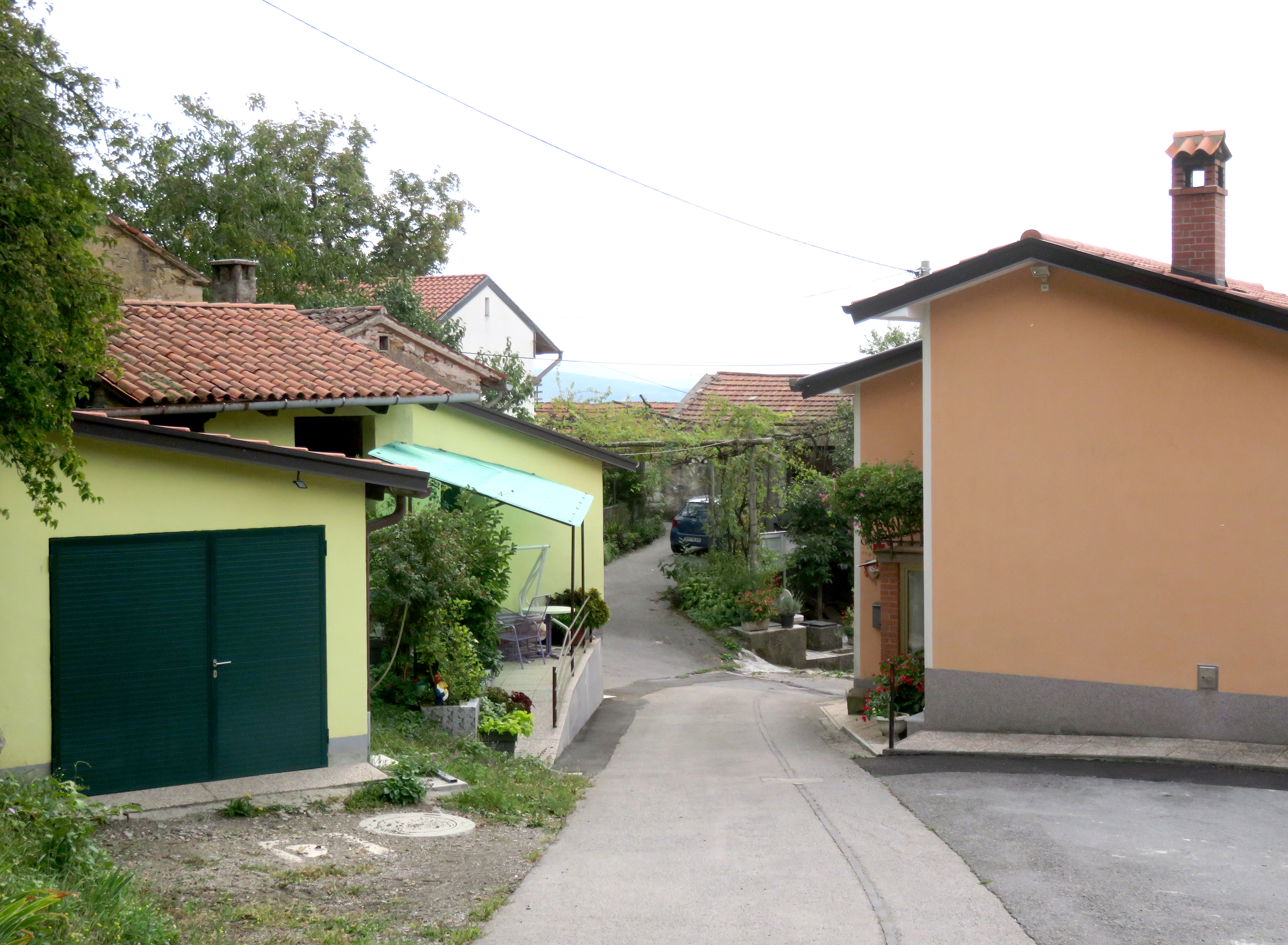

- Location in Slovenia
- Coordinates: 45°47′9.12″N 13°55′3.77″E
- Country: Slovenia
- Traditional region: Littoral
- Statistical region: Coastal–Karst
- Municipality: Sežana

Area
  - Total: 0.61 km^{2} (0.24 sq mi)
- Elevation: 497.1 m (1,631 ft)

Population (2002)
  - Total: 9

Bogo (pronounced [ˈboːɡɔ]) is a small settlement in the Municipality of Sežana in the Littoral region of Slovenia. Part of the village was burned down by German soldiers in the Second World War.

== Church ==
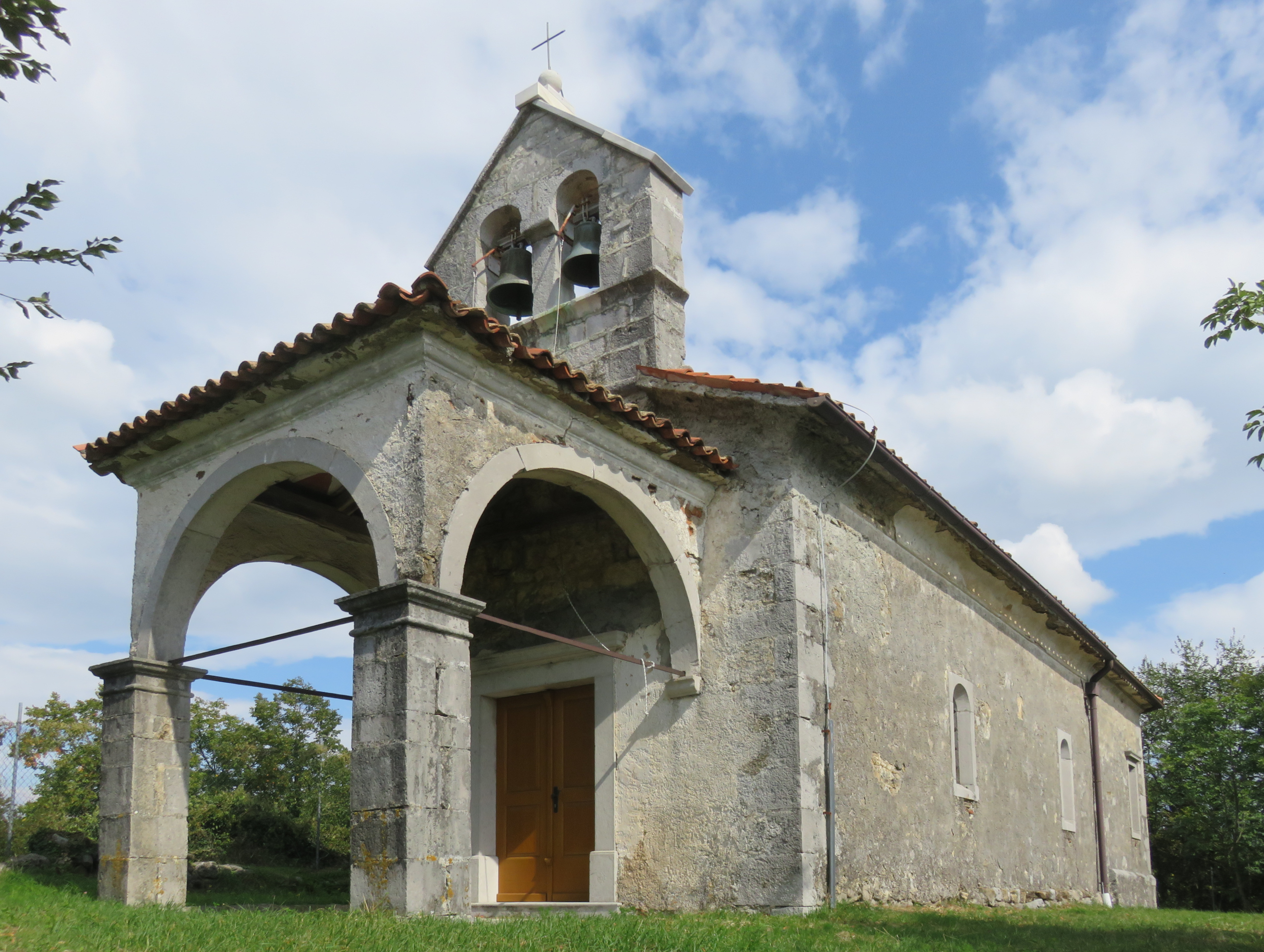
Saint Catherine's Church

The local church is dedicated to Saint Catherine of Alexandria and belongs to the Parish of Štjak.
