= Bogdan Pikuta =

Polish footballer

Personal information
- Date of birth: 12 August 1972 (age 54)
- Place of birth: Jaworzno, Poland
- Height: 1.75 m (5 ft 9 in)
- Position: Forward

Team information
- Current team: Górnik Piaski
- Number: 23

Senior career*
| Years | Team | Apps | (Gls) |
- Górnik Jaworzno
| 1992–1993 | Victoria Jaworzno | | |
| 1993 | Górnik Zabrze | 16 | (5) |
| 1993 | GKS Katowice | 4 | (0) |
| 1994 | Stal Stalowa Wola | 15 | (5) |
| 1994–1995 | Widzew Łódź | 28 | (8) |
| 1996–1997 | GKS Katowice | 42 | (6) |
| 1997–1998 | Raków Częstochowa | 17 | (0) |
| 1998–2002 | KSZO Ostrowiec Świętokrzyski | | |
| 2002–2003 | Zagłębie Sosnowiec | | |
| 2003–2004 | Victoria Jaworzno | | |
| 2004 | Zagłębie Sosnowiec II | | |
| 2006–2008 | Kilrush Rangers AFC | | |
| 2009 | MCKS Czeladź | | |
| 2012–2014 | Przemsza Okradzionów | | |
| 2014–2016 | Unia Dąbrowa Górnicza | | |
| 2016– | Górnik Piaski | | |
- * Club domestic league appearances and goals as of 12 August 2024

Bogdan Pikuta (born 12 August 1972) is a Polish footballer who plays as a forward for Górnik Piaski.

== Honours ==
Górnik Piaski

- Klasa A Sosnowiec: 2021–22
