= Stadion Eden (1953) =

Stadium in Prague, Czech Republic

- Eden
- Interactive map of Stadion Eden
- Full name: Stadion Eden Dr.Václava Vacka
- Location: Prague, Czech Republic
- Coordinates: 50°04′03″N 14°28′18″E
- Owner: Slavia Prague
- Operator: Slavia Prague
- Capacity: 38,000 (1953); 4,500 (2000)

Construction
- Opened: 27 September 1953
- Demolished: December 2003-2004

Tenant
- Slavia Prague (1953-1989, 1990s-2000)

Stadion Eden, officially named Stadion Dr. Václava Vacka, was a multi-use stadium in Prague, Czech Republic. It was initially used as the stadium of Slavia Prague matches. It was replaced by the current Eden Arena in 2008. The original capacity of the stadium was 38,000 spectators, mostly standing terraces.

== History ==
In the early 1950s, Slavia was forced to leave its stadium at Letná and a new stadium was built at Eden in the Vršovice district, known as Stadion Dr. Václava Vacka after Prague mayor Václav Vacek. Its capacity was about 38,000 (mostly for standing) and the stadium also featured an athletics track. The wooden western (main) stand was taken from the old stadium at Letná, the rest of the stands were made of concrete. The first match at this stadium took place on 27 September 1953, Slavia drew 1–1 against the team of Křídla vlasti Olomouc. Josef Bican scored the home team's goal.

In the 1970s, it became apparent that the stadium did not provide sufficient comfort for the visitors and planning started to build a new stadium at the same site. However, under the communist regime, the planning went quite slowly. Several projects were made, and construction was finally due to start in 1990. In 1989, Slavia moved temporarily to nearby Ďolíček stadium (then home of FC Bohemians Prague) and the eastern stand was torn down. However, the overthrowing of the communist regime in 1989 delayed the construction. In the meantime, Slavia moved to Stadion Evžena Rošického, a stadium on the Strahov hill, which is large but uncomfortable and poorly accessible.

In the early 1990s, the whole construction was cancelled and Slavia moved back to Eden. A temporary stand was built in the place of the former eastern stand, but it was clear that Eden was outdated and Slavia needed a new home ground. Several more projects were proposed, but Slavia was unable to raise sufficient funds and there were some legal problems, as the premises were owned by the government and it took a lot of effort to transfer them to Slavia. In 2000, the stadium was ineligible to host Czech league matches, so Slavia moved to the unpopular Strahov again.

== New stadium ==
In December 2003, the old and abandoned Eden stadium was torn down. 2006 saw the beginning of construction of a new stadium, which opened in May 2008 as the Eden Arena.
