= Volodymyr Musolitin =

Ukrainian footballer (born 1973)

Personal information
- Full name: Volodymyr Mykolayovych Musolitin
- Date of birth: 11 March 1973 (age 53)
- Place of birth: Odesa, Ukrainian SSR
- Height: 1.81 m (5 ft 11 in)
- Position: Forward

Youth career
- SSSOR Chornomorets Odesa

Senior career*
| Years | Team | Apps | (Gls) |
| 1991–1994 | SC Odesa | 70 | (13) |
| 1992–1993 | → CSK ZSU Kyiv | 28 | (8) |
| 1993 | → Naftovyk Okhtyrka | 13 | (3) |
| 1994–1997 | Chornomorets Odesa | 94 | (5) |
| 1998–1999 | Vorskla Poltava | 40 | (8) |
| 1998–1999 | → Vorskla-2 Poltava | 7 | (2) |
| 1999–2000 | CSKA Kyiv | 37 | (9) |
| 1999–2000 | → CSKA-2 Kyiv | 9 | (2) |
| 2001 | Vorskla Poltava | 23 | (3) |
| 2001 | → Vorskla-2 Poltava | 7 | (8) |
| 2002–2003 | Kryvbas Kryvyi Rih | 27 | (13) |
| 2003 | Metalurh Zaporizhzhia | 6 | (0) |
| 2004 | Dnister Ovidiopol | 19 | (6) |

International career
| 2002 | Ukraine | 3 | (1) |
- * Club domestic league appearances and goals

Volodymyr Mykolayovych Musolitin (Ukrainian: Володимир Миколайович Мусолітін; born 11 March 1973) is a Ukrainian and former Soviet professional footballer.

== Personal life ==
Volodymyr is the father of Ukrainian professional footballer Mykola Musolitin.

== International goal ==
Scores and results list Ukraine's goal tally first.

| No | Date | Venue | Opponent | Score | Result | Competition |
|---|---|---|---|---|---|---|
| 1. | 17 May 2002 | Dynamo Stadium, Moscow, Russia | FR Yugoslavia | 2–0 | 2–0 | LG Cup |
