= Stefan Machaj =

Polish footballer

Personal information
- Date of birth: 29 September 1964 (age 62)
- Place of birth: Głogów, Poland
- Height: 1.84 m (6 ft 0 in)
- Position: Defender

Senior career*
Years	Team	Apps	(Gls)
1982–1989	Śląsk Wrocław	140	(8)
1989–1992	Zagłębie Lubin	85	(13)
1992–1993	Pogoń Szczecin	26	(1)
1993–1996	Zagłębie Lubin	98	(10)
1996–1999	Hapoel Jerusalem	78	(0)
2000	Pomerania Police		
2000	Odra Szczecin		
2000–2001	Odra Opole		
2003–2004	Odra Chobienia		
- * Club domestic league appearances and goals

Stefan Machaj (born 29 September 1964) is a Polish former professional footballer who played as a defender.

== Honours ==
Śląsk Wrocław

- Polish Cup: 1986–87

Zagłębie Lubin

- Ekstraklasa: 1990–91
