= Lubin Stadium (1985) =

Football stadium in Lubin, Poland

Coordinates: 51°24′48″N 16°11′51″E

Stadion Zagłębia Lubin
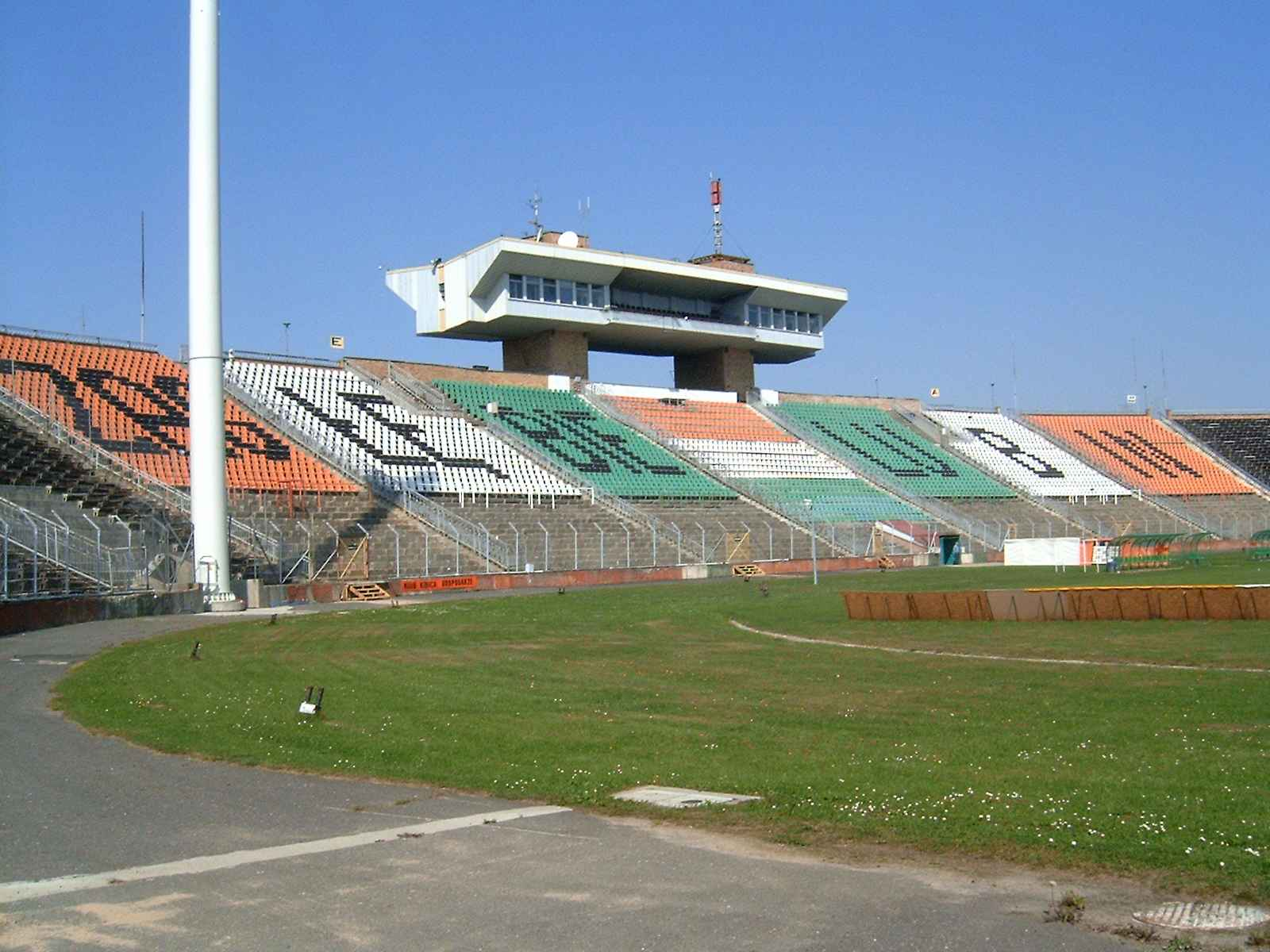
- Interactive map of Stadion Zagłębia Lubin
- Location: Lubin, Poland
- Owner: Lubin
- Capacity: 32,430

Construction
- Built: 1985
- Opened: 22 July 1985

Tenant
- Zagłębie Lubin

Stadion Zagłębia Lubin (Zagłębie Lubin Stadium) was a football stadium in Lubin, Poland. It served as the home ground of Zagłębie Lubin until the Municipal Stadium opened in 2009. The stadium had a capacity of 32,430 people and opened in 1985.

The stadium hosted two games for the Poland national football team. The first was a 2–0 win against the East Germany national football team on August 19, 1987. The second was a 1–1 draw against the Soviet Union national football team on 23 August 1989.
