= Juris Karašausks =

Latvian footballer

Personal information
- Date of birth: 18 January 1970 (age 56)
- Position: Forward

Senior career*
Years	Team	Apps	(Gls)
–1988	RAF Jelgava		
1988–?	FSK Daugava 90		
1992–1993	FK Pārdaugava		
1994	Vidus Rīga		
1994–1995	RAF Jelgava		
1996–1998	Dinaburg FC		
1999–2000	FK Rīga		

International career
1995–1998	Latvia	6	(0)
- * Club domestic league appearances and goals

Juris Karašausks (born 18 January 1970) is a retired Latvian football striker.

His son Artūrs Karašausks is also a football striker and a member of national team.
