= Michael Larsen (footballer) =

Danish footballer (born 1969)

Personal information
- Date of birth: 16 October 1969 (age 57)
- Place of birth: Odense, Denmark
- Position: Midfielder

Youth career
- Fraugde
- B 1913

Senior career*
Years	Team	Apps	(Gls)
1989–1992	B 1913	75	(5)
1992–2003	Silkeborg	269	(25)
Total		344	(30)

International career
1993	Denmark	2	(0)
Medal record
Men's football
Representing Denmark
CONMEBOL–UEFA Cup of Champions
Runner-up	1993 Argentina
- * Club domestic league appearances and goals

Michael Larsen (born 16 October 1969) is a Danish former professional footballer who played as a midfielder. He played two games for the Denmark national football team in 1993, and represented Denmark at the 1992 Summer Olympics football tournament. He played most of his career for Silkeborg IF, and won the 1994 Danish Superliga championship and 2001 Danish Cup tournament with the club.

== Honours ==
Silkeborg

- Danish Superliga: 1993–94
- UEFA Intertoto Cup: 1996
- Danish Cup: 2000–01
