= Ruslan Vasylkyv =

Ukrainian footballer

Personal information
- Date of birth: 8 January 1973 (age 53)
- Position: Defender

Senior career*
Years	Team	Apps	(Gls)
1991–1993	SC Odesa	22	(1)
1993–1994	Chornomorets-2 Odesa	20	(4)
1994–1995	SC Odesa	20	(1)
1995	Chornomorets Odesa	13	(2)
1996–1997	Mikolaiv	55	(3)
1998	SC Odesa	29	(1)
1999	Chornomorets Odesa	18	(0)
1999	→ Chornomorets-2 Odesa	7	(0)
2000	Portovyk Illichivsk	19	(1)
2001	Spartak Sumy	14	(0)
2001–2002	Obolon Kyiv	16	(1)
2001–2002	→ Obolon-2 Kyiv	11	(0)
2003–2005	Real Odesa	37	(4)
2005–2006	Ivan Odesa	10	(1)
- * Club domestic league appearances and goals

Ruslan Vasylkyv (born 8 January 1973) is a retired Ukrainian football defender.
