= René Glatzer =

Austrian footballer

Personal information
- Date of birth: 24 February 1977 (age 49)
- Place of birth: Mödling
- Position: Midfielder

Senior career*
Years	Team	Apps	(Gls)
1994–1999	Austria Wien		
1999–2002	Austria Wien II		
2002–2003	LASK Linz		
2003–2004	Wiener Sport-Club		
- * Club domestic league appearances and goals

René Glatzer (born 24 February 1977) is a retired Austrian football midfielder.
