= Quantum bogodynamics =

Parody of quantum mechanics

Quantum bogodynamics (/ˌkwɒntəm ˌboʊɡoʊdaɪˈnæmɪks/) is a humorous parody of quantum mechanics that describes the universe through interactions of fictional elementary particles, bogons (by analogy to the naming of real elementary particles, e.g. photons; but also from the English word bogus, meaning 'fake'). Bogosity refers to the degree to which something is bogus.

This theory assumes the existence of three basic phenomena:

- Bogon-emitting sources (such as politicians, used-car dealers, TV preachers, and teleshopping hosts)
- Bogon absorbers (or sinks) (taxpayers and computers),
- Bogosity potential fields.

The Jargon File Glossary describes the theory as follows:

Here is a representative QBD theory: The bogon is a boson (integral spin, +1 or −1), and has zero rest mass. In this respect it is very much like a photon. However, it has a much greater momentum, thus explaining its destructive effect on computer electronics and human nervous systems. The corollary to this is that bogons also have tremendous inertia, and therefore a bogon beam is deflected only with great difficulty. When the bogon encounters its antiparticle, the cluon, they mutually annihilate each other, releasing magic smoke. Furthermore 1 Lenat = 1 mole (6.022E23) of bogons.

The unit of bogosity is microLenat, proposed by David Jefferson, and was intended as an attack against computer scientist Doug Lenat. "Doug had failed the student on an important exam because the student gave only 'AI is bogus' as his answer to the questions. The slur is generally considered unmerited, but it has nevertheless become a running gag. Some of Doug's friends argue that of course a microLenat is bogus, since it is only one millionth of a Lenat. Others have suggested that the unit should be redesignated after the grad student, as the microReid."

The term comes from hacker culture, where bogons were used to describe units of "bogusness" or failure.
