= Václav Budka =

Czech footballer

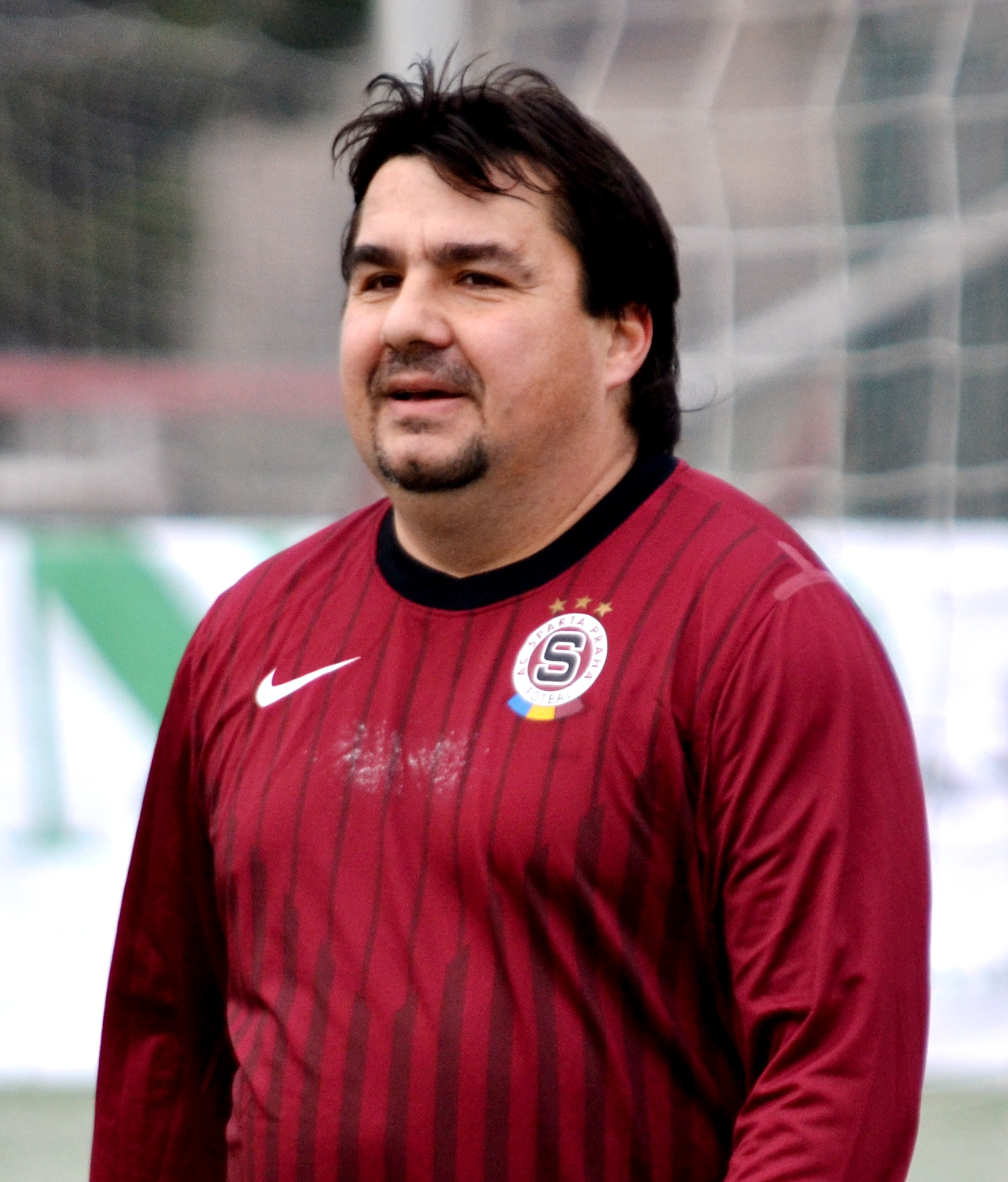

Personal information
- Date of birth: 22 March 1969 (age 57)
- Position: Midfielder

Senior career*
Years	Team	Apps	(Gls)
1993–1996	AC Sparta Praha	62	(9)
1996–1999	Sporting Lokeren	77	(7)
2000–2001	FK Jablonec	16	(0)
2001–2002	FK Mladá Boleslav		
2002–2006	FC Chomutov		
- * Club domestic league appearances and goals

Václav Budka (born 22 March 1969) is a retired Czech football midfielder.
