= Marcin Boguś =

Polish footballer

Personal information
- Date of birth: 11 July 1973 (age 53)
- Place of birth: Łódź, Poland
- Height: 1.77 m (5 ft 10 in)
- Position: Midfielder

Senior career*
Years	Team	Apps	(Gls)
1990–1996	Widzew Łódź	57	(1)
1996	Zagłębie Lubin	10	(10)
1996–2001	Ceramika Opoczno		
2002–2004	Górnik Łęczna		
2004–2005	KSZO Ostrowiec Świętokrzyski	28	(0)
2005–2006	Heko Czermno	25	(0)
2006–2008	Woy Opoczno		
2008–2009	Woy Bukowiec Opoczyński	30	(0)
2009–2010	Broń Radom		
2010–2011	Jandar Bodzechów		
2011–2013	Powiślanka Lipsko		
- * Club domestic league appearances and goals

Marcin Boguś (born 11 July 1973) is a Polish former professional footballer who played as a defender.

== Honours ==
Widzew Łódź

- Ekstraklasa: 1995–96
