= Amir Avigdor =

Israeli former football association

Personal information
- Date of birth: 29 January 1970 (age 56)
- Place of birth: Beersheba, Israel
- Positions: Attacking midfielder; forward

Youth career
- Hapoel Be'er Sheva

Senior career*
Years	Team	Apps	(Gls)
1989–1992	Hapoel Be'er Sheva		
1992–1993	Hapoel Haifa	8	(0)
1993–1996	Hapoel Be'er Sheva	87	(23)
1996–1997	Bnei Yehuda	30	(2)
1997–1998	Hapoel Be'er Sheva	27	(1)
1998–1999	Hapoel Tzafririm Holon	18	(2)
1999–2001	Hapoel Nazareth Illit		
2001	Maccabi Ashkelon		
2001–2002	Beitar Be'er Sheva		

Managerial career
- 2008: Hapoel Be'er Sheva (U19)
- * Club domestic league appearances and goals

Amir Avigdor (Hebrew: אמיר אביגדור; born 29 January 1970) is a retired footballer who played as a forward. Most of his career, he played for Hapoel Be'er Sheva.

== Playing career ==
Avigdor began playing as a child in Hapoel Be'er Sheva's youth division. On 13 May 1989, he made his debut in the senior team in the match against Shimshon Tel Aviv and also scored his debut goal.

In 1992, he signed to Hapoel Haifa. One year later, he returned to Hapoel Be'er Sheva and scored 16 goals in 1993–94 season.

Later in the career, he played in Bnei Yehuda, Hapoel Tzafririm Holon, Hapoel Nazareth Illit, Maccabi Ashkelon and Beitar Be'er Sheva.

In 2012 he emigrated to Phoenix, Arizona.
