= BogoMips =

Unscientific measurement of CPU speed made by the Linux kernel

BogoMips (from "bogus" and MIPS) is a crude measurement of CPU speed made by the Linux kernel when it boots to calibrate an internal busy-loop. An often-quoted definition of the term is "the number of million times per second a processor can do absolutely nothing".

BogoMips is a value that can be used to verify whether the processor in question is in the proper range of similar processors, i.e. BogoMips represents a processor's clock frequency as well as the potentially present CPU cache. It is not usable for performance comparisons among different CPUs.

== History ==
In 1993, Lars Wirzenius posted a Usenet message explaining the reasons for its introduction in the Linux kernel on comp.os.linux:

[...]

MIPS is short for Millions of Instructions Per Second. It is a measure for the computation speed of a processor. Like most such measures, it is more often abused than used properly (it is very difficult to justly compare MIPS for different kinds of computers).

BogoMips are Linus's own invention. The linux kernel version 0.99.11 (dated 11 July 1993) needed a timing loop (the time is too short and/or needs to be too exact for a non-busy-loop method of waiting), which must be calibrated to the processor speed of the machine. Hence, the kernel measures at boot time how fast a certain kind of busy loop runs on a computer. "Bogo" comes from "bogus", i.e., something which is a fake. Hence, the BogoMips value gives some indication of the processor speed, but it is way too unscientific to be called anything but BogoMips.

The reasons (there are two) it is printed during boot-up is that a) it is slightly useful for debugging and for checking that the computer[’]s caches and turbo button work, and b) Linus loves to chuckle when he sees confused people on the news.

[...]

== Proper BogoMips ratings ==
As a very approximate guide, the BogoMips can be pre-calculated by the following table. The given rating is typical for that CPU with the then current and applicable Linux version. The index is the ratio of "BogoMips per clock speed" for any CPU to the same for an Intel 386DX CPU, for comparison purposes.

System	Rating	Index
Intel 8088	clock × 0.004	0.02
Intel/AMD 386SX	clock × 0.14	0.8
Intel/AMD 386DX	clock × 0.18	1 (definition)
Motorola 68030	clock × 0.25	1.4
Cyrix/IBM 486	clock × 0.34	1.8
Intel Pentium	clock × 0.40	2.2
Intel 486	clock × 0.50	2.8
AMD 5x86	clock × 0.50	2.8
MIPS R4000/R4400	clock × 0.50	2.8
ARM9	clock × 0.50	2.8
Motorola 68040	clock × 0.67	3.7
PowerPC 603	clock × 0.67	3.7
Intel StrongARM	clock × 0.66	3.7
NexGen Nx586	clock × 0.75	4.2
PowerPC 601	clock × 0.84	4.7
Alpha 21064/21064A	clock × 0.99	5.5
Alpha 21066/21066A	clock × 0.99	5.5
Alpha 21164/21164A	clock × 0.99	5.5
Intel Pentium Pro	clock × 0.99	5.5
Cyrix 5x86/6x86	clock × 1.00	5.6
Intel Pentium II/III	clock × 1.00	5.6
AMD K7/Athlon	clock × 1.00	5.6
Intel Celeron	clock × 1.00	5.6
Intel Itanium	clock × 1.00	5.6
R4600	clock × 1.00	5.6
Hitachi SH-4	clock × 1.00	5.6
Raspberry Pi (Model B)	clock × 1.00	5.6
Intel Itanium 2	clock × 1.49	8.3
Alpha 21264	clock × 1.99	11.1
VIA Centaur	clock × 1.99	11.1
AMD K5/K6/K6-2/K6-III	clock × 2.00	11.1
AMD Duron/Athlon XP	clock × 2.00	11.1
AMD Sempron	clock × 2.00	11.1
UltraSparc II	clock × 2.00	11.1
Intel Pentium MMX	clock × 2.00	11.1
Intel Pentium 4	clock × 2.00	11.1
Intel Pentium M	clock × 2.00	11.1
Intel Core Duo	clock × 2.00	11.1
Intel Core 2 Duo	clock × 2.00	11.1
Intel Atom N455	clock × 2.00	11.1
Centaur C6-2	clock × 2.00	11.1
PowerPC 604/604e/750	clock × 2.00	11.1
Intel Pentium III Coppermine	clock × 2.00	11.1
Intel Pentium III Xeon	clock × 2.00	11.1
Motorola 68060	clock × 2.00	11.1
Intel Xeon MP (32-bit) (hyper-threading)	clock × 3.97	22.1
AMD Ryzen 7 PRO 8840HS (hyper-threading)	clock × 2.00	6588.14

With the 2.2.14 Linux kernel, a caching setting of the CPU state was moved from behind to before the BogoMips calculation. Although the BogoMips algorithm itself wasn't changed, from that kernel onward the BogoMips rating for then current Pentium CPUs was twice that of the rating before the change. The changed BogoMips outcome had no effect on real processor performance.

In a shell, BogoMips can be easily obtained by searching the cpuinfo file:

$ grep -i bogomips /proc/cpuinfo

== Computation of BogoMips ==
With kernel 2.6.x, BogoMips are implemented in the /usr/src/linux/init/calibrate.c kernel source file. It computes the Linux kernel timing parameter loops_per_jiffy (see jiffy) value. The explanation from source code:

  /*
   * A simple loop like
   *  while ( jiffies < start_jiffies+1)
   *    start = read_current_timer();
   * will not do. As we don't really know whether jiffy switch
   * happened first or timer_value was read first. And some asynchronous
   * event can happen between these two events introducing errors in lpj.
   *
   * So, we do
   * 1. pre_start <- When we are sure that jiffy switch hasn't happened
   * 2. check jiffy switch
   * 3. start <- timer value before or after jiffy switch
   * 4. post_start <- When we are sure that jiffy switch has happened
   *
   * Note, we don't know anything about order of 2 and 3.
   * Now, by looking at post_start and pre_start difference, we can
   * check whether any asynchronous event happened or not
   */

loops_per_jiffy is used to implement udelay (delay in microseconds) and ndelay (delay in nanoseconds) functions. These functions are needed by some drivers to wait for hardware. Note that a busy waiting technique is used, so the kernel is effectively blocked when executing ndelay/udelay functions. For i386 architecture delay_loop is implemented in /usr/src/linux/arch/i386/lib/delay.c as:

/* simple loop based delay: */
static void delay_loop(unsigned long loops)
{
  int d0;

  __asm__ __volatile__(
    "\tjmp 1f\n"
    ".align 16\n"
    "1:\tjmp 2f\n"
    ".align 16\n"
    "2:\tdecl %0\n\tjns 2b"
    :"=&a" (d0)
    :"0" (loops));
}

equivalent to the following assembler code

;  input: eax = d0
; output: eax = 0
       jmp  start
.align 16
start: jmp  body
.align 16
body:  decl eax
       jns  body

which can be rewritten to C-pseudocode

static void delay_loop(long loops)
{
  long d0 = loops;
  do {
    --d0;
  } while (d0 >= 0);
}

Full and complete information and details about BogoMips, and hundreds of reference entries can be found in the (outdated) BogoMips mini-Howto.

== Timer-based delays ==
In 2012, ARM contributed a new udelay implementation allowing the system timer built into many ARMv7 CPUs to be used instead of a busy-wait loop. This implementation was released in Version 3.6 of the Linux kernel. Timer-based delays are more robust on systems that use frequency scaling to dynamically adjust the processor's speed at runtime, as loops_per_jiffies values may not necessarily scale linearly. Also, since the timer frequency is known in advance, no calibration is needed at boot time.

One side effect of this change is that the BogoMIPS value will reflect the timer frequency, not the CPU's core frequency. Typically the timer frequency is much lower than the processor's maximum frequency, and some users may be surprised to see an unusually low BogoMIPS value when comparing against systems that use traditional busy-wait loops.

== See also ==
- Turbo button
- Instructions per second
