= 1995 UEFA Intertoto Cup =

Tournament details
- Dates: 24 June – 2 August
- Teams: 60

Final positions
- Champions: (France) Strasbourg (France) Bordeaux

Tournament statistics
- Matches played: 132
- Goals scored: 433 (3.28 per match)
- Top scorer(s): Franck Sauzée (Strasbourg); 6 goals
- Statistics do not include the semi-finals, which were part of the UEFA Cup.

The 1995 UEFA Intertoto Cup was the first edition of the tournament administered by the UEFA. It saw Strasbourg and Bordeaux win their semi-finals to advance to the first round of the UEFA Cup, the latter eventually finishing runners-up. It also saw English representatives Wimbledon and Tottenham Hotspur banned from European competition for the following season, after both had fielded under-strength sides in their respective Intertoto Cup matches. The ban was lifted on appeal but England were still forced to forfeit their UEFA Fair Play berth for the 1996–97 UEFA Cup.

The 1995 competition also saw the return of Yugoslav clubs on the international scene after three years of ban due to UN embargo. However both representatives, Bečej and Budućnost, were eliminated in the group stage.

== Qualified teams ==
Qualified teams for 1995 UEFA Intertoto Cup
Entry round	Teams			
Group stage	(Austria) Tirol Innsbruck (5th)	(Austria) LASK Linz (6th)	(Austria) Vorwärts Steyr (8th)	(Belarus) Dnepr Mogilev (5th)
Group stage	(Belgium) Germinal Ekeren (6th)	(Belgium) Beveren (10th)	(Belgium) Charleroi (13th)	(Bulgaria) Spartak Plovdiv (6th)
Group stage	(Bulgaria) Etar Veliko Tarnovo (9th)	(Croatia) NK Zagreb (4th)	(Cyprus) Nea Salamis Famagusta (3rd)	(Czechoslovakia) Boby Brno (3rd)
Group stage	(Denmark) Aarhus GF (4th)	(Denmark) Næstved (5th)	(Denmark) Odense (8th)	(England) Tottenham Hotspur (7th)
Group stage	(England) Wimbledon (9th)	(England) Sheffield Wednesday (13th)	(Estonia) Tervis Pärnu (1st)	(Faroe Islands) HB Tórshavn (2nd)
Group stage	(Finland) HJK (3rd)	(France) Bordeaux (7th)	(France) Metz (8th)	(France) Cannes (9th)
Group stage	(France) Strasbourg (10th)	(Germany) Bayer Leverkusen (7th)	(Germany) Karlsruhe (8th)	(Germany) Eintracht Frankfurt (9th)
Group stage	(Germany) Köln (10th)	(Greece) Iraklis (6th)	(Greece) OFI (9th)	(Hungary) Békéscsaba (5th)
Group stage	(Iceland) Keflavík (3rd)	(Republic of Ireland) Bohemians (4th)	(Israel) Hapoel Petah Tikva (5th)	(Israel) Beitar Jerusalem (6th)
Group stage	(Lithuania) Panerys Vilnius (4th)	(Malta) Floriana (4th)	(Netherlands) Heerenveen (9th)	(Netherlands) Groningen (13th)
Group stage	(Norway) Tromsø (7th)	(Poland) Górnik Zabrze (5th)	(Poland) Pogoń Szczecin (8th)	(Portugal) Leiria (6th)
Group stage	(Romania) Ceahlăul (5th)	(Romania) Farul Constanța (11th)	(Romania) Universitatea Cluj (12th)	(Scotland) Partick Thistle (8th)
Group stage	(Slovakia) Košice (2nd)	(Slovenia) Rudar Velenje (7th)	(Sweden) Norrköping (4th)	(Sweden) Öster (5th)
Group stage	(Switzerland) Aarau (4th)	(Switzerland) Luzern (5th)	(Switzerland) Basel (7th)	(Turkey) Gençlerbirliği (5th)
Group stage	(Turkey) Bursaspor (6th)	(Wales) Ton Pentre (3rd)	(Federal Republic of Yugoslavia) Budućnost (1st)	(Federal Republic of Yugoslavia) Bečej (4th)

== Group stage ==
=== Group 1 ===
Pos	Team	Pld	W	D	L	GF	GA	GD	Pts	Qualification	KAR	SHW	BAS	AAR	GÓR
1	(Germany) Karlsruhe	4	3	1	0	13	4	+9	10	Advanced to round of 16	—	1–1	—	3–0	—
2	(England) Sheffield Wednesday	4	2	1	1	7	5	+2	7		—	—	—	3–1	3–2
3	(Switzerland) Basel	4	2	0	2	6	6	0	6		2–3	1–0	—	—	—
4	(Denmark) Aarhus GF	4	2	0	2	7	8	−1	6		—	—	2–1	—	4–1
5	(Poland) Górnik Zabrze	4	0	0	4	5	15	−10	0		1–6	—	1–2	—	—

Source: rsssf.com
24 June 1995
17:00

Aarhus GF (Denmark)	4–1	(Poland) Górnik Zabrze
Mortensen 48'; Skovgaard 52'; Jørgensen 58'; Jokovic 72'	Report	Brzoza 82'

Aarhus Idrætspark, Aarhus
Attendance: 1,375
Referee: Kenny Clark (Scotland)

24 June 1995
20:00

Basel (Switzerland)	1–0	(England) Sheffield Wednesday
Rey 68'	Report

St. Jakob Stadium, Basel
Attendance: 5,200
Referee: Manuel Schüttengruber (Austria)

1 July 1995
17:00

Górnik Zabrze (Poland)	1–2	(Switzerland) Basel
Brzoza 39'	Report	Zuffi 27', 41'

Stadion Górnika, Zabrze
Attendance: 1,714
Referee: Ladislav Gadosi (Slovakia)

1 July 1995
18:00

Karlsruhe (Germany)	3–0	(Denmark) Aarhus GF
Knup 2'; Bender 39'; Wück 55'	Report

Wildparkstadion, Karlsruhe
Attendance: 6,000
Referee: Amand Ancion (Belgium)

8 July 1995
15:00

Sheffield Wednesday (England)	3–2	(Poland) Górnik Zabrze
Krzętowski 13' (o.g.); Bright 44'; Waddle 53'	Report	Szemoński 30'; Woods 72' (o.g.)

Millmoor, Rotherham (Note: These matches were played at Rotherham United's nearby Millmoor ground, as Hillsborough was unavailable due to construction work ahead of UEFA Euro 1996.)
Attendance: 5,592
Referee: Alan Snoddy (Northern Ireland)

8 July 1995
16:00

Basel (Switzerland)	2–3	(Germany) Karlsruhe
Zuffi 39' (pen.); Rey 84'	Report	Fink 13'; Nowotny 31'; Schmitt 78'

St. Jakob Stadium, Basel
Attendance: 11,300
Referee: Gylfi Þór Orrason (Iceland)

15 July 1995
16:00

Karlsruhe (Germany)	1–1	(England) Sheffield Wednesday
Bilić 5'	Report	Bright 81'

Wildparkstadion, Karlsruhe
Attendance: 13,000
Referee: Pierluigi Collina (Italy)

15 July 1995
17:00

Aarhus GF (Denmark)	2–1	(Switzerland) Basel
Jokovic 7'; Piechnik 35'	Report	Yakin 78'

Aarhus Idrætspark, Aarhus
Attendance: 1,600
Referee: Timo Keltanen (Finland)

22 July 1995
15:00

Sheffield Wednesday (England)	3–1	(Denmark) Aarhus GF
Bright 11', 49'; Petrescu		Jokovic 23'

Millmoor, Rotherham
Attendance: 6,990
Referee: Jan Wegereef (Netherlands)

22 July 1995
17:00

Górnik Zabrze (Poland)	1–6	(Germany) Karlsruhe
Koseła 73' (pen.)	Report	Bilić 16'; Knup 52', 64'; Tarnat 53'; Häßler 80' (pen.); Wück 88'

Stadion Górnika, Zabrze
Attendance: 3,000
Referee: Vencel Tóth (Hungary)

=== Group 2 ===
Pos	Team	Pld	W	D	L	GF	GA	GD	Pts	Qualification	KÖL	LUZ	ÖST	TOT	RUD
1	(Germany) Köln	4	2	2	0	11	2	+9	8	Advanced to round of 16	—	2–2	—	8–0	—
2	(Switzerland) Luzern	4	2	2	0	8	5	+3	8		—	—	3–2	—	1–1
3	(Sweden) Öster	4	2	1	1	7	5	+2	7		0–0	—	—	—	3–1
4	(England) Tottenham Hotspur	4	1	0	3	3	13	−10	3		—	0–2	1–2	—	—
5	(Slovenia) Rudar Velenje	4	0	1	3	3	7	−4	1		0–1	—	—	1–2	—

Source: rsssf.com
25 June 1995
18:00

Öster (Sweden)	0–0	(Germany) Köln
	Report

Värendsvallen, Växjö
Attendance: 804
Referee: Jacek Granat (Poland)

25 June 1995
12:00

Tottenham Hotspur (England)	0–2	(Switzerland) Luzern
	Report	Fink 69'; Aleksandrov 87'

Goldstone Ground, Hove (Note: These matches were played at Brighton & Hove Albion's Goldstone Ground as White Hart Lane was unavailable.)
Attendance: 2,497
Referee: Bertrand Saules (France)

1 July 1995
17:00

Rudar Velenje (Slovenia)	1–2	(England) Tottenham Hotspur
Ekmečić 4'	Report	Sampson 15'; Hendry 61'

Ob Jezeru, Velenje
Attendance: 2,000
Referee: Lubomír Puček (Czech Republic)

1 July 1995

Luzern (Switzerland)	3–2	(Sweden) Öster
Fink 34'; Aleksandrov 42', 61'		Eklund 23'; Axeldal 71'

Stadion Allmend, Lucerne
Attendance: 2,000
Referee: Alain Hamer (Luxembourg)

8 July 1995
15:30

Köln (Germany)	2–2	(Switzerland) Luzern
Labbadia 12'; Baumann 14'	Report	Wolf 28'; Aleksandrov 69'

Müngersdorferstadion, Cologne
Attendance: 5,300
Referee: Hugo Luyten (Netherlands)

9 July 1995

Öster (Sweden)	3–1	(Slovenia) Rudar Velenje
Ernstsson 71', 85'; Bild 82'		Komar 89'

Värendsvallen, Växjö
Attendance: 522
Referee: Oleg Timofeyev (Estonia)

15 July 1995
15:00

Tottenham Hotspur (England)	1–2	(Sweden) Öster
McMahon 27'		Eklund 33', 86'

Goldstone Ground, Hove
Attendance: 2,143
Referee: Fernand Meese (Belgium)

16 July 1995
18:00

Rudar Velenje (Slovenia)	0–1	(Germany) Köln
	Report	Polster 16'

Ob Jezeru, Velenje
Attendance: 2,000
Referee: Fritz Stuchlik (Austria)

22 July 1995
17:45

Köln (Germany)	8–0	(England) Tottenham Hotspur
Munteanu 4', 51'; Labbadia 10', 30', 83'; Polster 37', 58'; Kohn 88'	Report

Müngersdorferstadion, Cologne
Attendance: 6,100
Referee: Knud Erik Fisker (Denmark)

22 July 1995

Luzern (Switzerland)	1–1	(Slovenia) Rudar Velenje
Fink 10'		Cvikl 56'

Stadion Allmend, Lucerne
Attendance: 2,000
Referee: Gianni Beschin (Italy)

=== Group 3 ===
Pos	Team	Pld	W	D	L	GF	GA	GD	Pts	Qualification	AAR	GER	TRO	TÓR	UCL
1	(Switzerland) Aarau	4	2	2	0	14	8	+6	8	Advanced to round of 16	—	—	2–2	6–1	—
2	(Belgium) Germinal Ekeren	4	2	2	0	10	5	+5	8		3–3	—	—	—	4–1
3	(Norway) Tromsø	4	2	1	1	13	4	+9	7		—	0–2	—	10–0	—
4	(Faroe Islands) HB Tórshavn	4	0	2	2	2	17	−15	2		—	1–1	—	—	0–0
5	(Romania) Universitatea Cluj	4	0	1	3	3	8	−5	1		2–3	—	0–1	—	—

Source: rsssf.com
25 June 1995
17:00

Aarau (Switzerland)	2–2	(Norway) Tromsø
Kilian 73'; Wiederkehr 89'	Report	Flo 61'; Berg Johansen 86'

Stadion Brügglifeld, Aarau
Attendance: 2,430
Referee: Štefan Tivold (Slovenia)

25 June 1995
20:00

HB Tórshavn (Faroe Islands)	0–0	(Romania) Universitatea Cluj
	Report

Svangaskarð, Toftir
Attendance: 421
Referee: Per-Olof Ståhl (Sweden)

2 July 1995
16:00

Germinal Ekeren (Belgium)	3–3	(Switzerland) Aarau
Kinet 10'; Lukaku 16'; Radzinski 85'	Report	Wiederkehr 20'; Wyss 21'; Allenspach 71'

Stadion Louis Lucas, Kapellen
Attendance: 1,500
Referee: Georg Dardenne (Germany)

2 July 1995

Tromsø (Norway)	10–0	(Faroe Islands) HB Tórshavn
Hafstad 20', 31'; Flo 25', 41', 46'; Swift 33' (pen.), 50' (pen.), 75'; Berg Johansen 63', 89'	Report

Alfheim Stadion, Tromsø
Attendance: 1,461
Referee: Mika Peltola (Finland)

9 July 1995
16:00

HB Tórshavn (Faroe Islands)	1–1	(Belgium) Germinal Ekeren
Clementsen 86'	Report	Halmai 79'

Svangaskarð, Toftir
Attendance: 250
Referee: Jørn West Larsen (Denmark)

9 July 1995

Universitatea Cluj (Romania)	0–1	(Norway) Tromsø
	Report	Berg Johansen 84'

Stadionul Ion Moina, Cluj-Napoca
Attendance: 1,000
Referee: Antoine De Pandis (France)

15 July 1995

Germinal Ekeren (Belgium)	4–1	(Romania) Universitatea Cluj
Radzinski 34', 80'; Wégria 35'; Dheedene 46'	Report	Niță 61'

Stadion Veltwijckpark, Ekeren
Attendance: 552
Referee: Roelof Luinge (Netherlands)

16 July 1995
17:00

Aarau (Switzerland)	6–1	(Faroe Islands) HB Tórshavn
Skrzypczak 13', 26', 49', 54'; Wiederkehr 15'; Saibene 58'	Report	Mohr 36'

Stadion Brügglifeld, Aarau
Attendance: 1,610
Referee: Charles Schaak (Luxembourg)

23 July 1995

Universitatea Cluj (Romania)	2–3	(Switzerland) Aarau
Falub 58'; Șandru 74'	Report	Ratinho 20'; Allenspach 67'; Wyss 76'

Stadionul Ion Moina, Cluj-Napoca
Attendance: 500
Referee: Zygmunt Ziober (Poland)

23 July 1995

Tromsø (Norway)	0–2	(Belgium) Germinal Ekeren
	Report	Radzinski 48'; Abeels 56'

Alfheim Stadion, Tromsø
Attendance: 1,039
Referee: William Young (Scotland)

=== Group 4 ===
Pos	Team	Pld	W	D	L	GF	GA	GD	Pts	Qualification	HEE	LEI	NÆS	BÉK	TON
1	(Netherlands) Heerenveen	4	3	0	1	13	2	+11	9	Advanced to round of 16	—	—	2–1	4–0	—
2	(Portugal) Leiria	4	2	2	0	7	3	+4	8		1–0	—	1–1	—	—
3	(Denmark) Næstved	4	1	2	1	7	6	+1	5		—	—	—	3–3	2–0
4	(Hungary) Békéscsaba	4	1	2	1	9	9	0	5		—	2–2	—	—	4–0
5	(Wales) Ton Pentre	4	0	0	4	0	16	−16	0		0–7	0–3	—	—	—

Source: rsssf.com
24 June 1995

Békéscsaba (Hungary)	2–2	(Portugal) Leiria
Kulcsár 40'; Mracskó 76'		Telmo Pinto 27'; Pinha 50'

Stadion Kórház utcai, Békéscsaba
Attendance: 1,698
Referee: Vahap Beyaz (Turkey)

25 June 1995

Heerenveen (Netherlands)	2–1	(Denmark) Næstved
Hellinga 64'; Tammer 88'		Jakobsen 49'

Abe Lenstra Stadion, Heerenveen
Attendance: 6,800
Referee: Richard O'Hanlon (Ireland)

1 July 1995

Ton Pentre (Wales)	0–7	(Netherlands) Heerenveen
		Hansma 11', 23'; Regtop 16', 82'; Tammer 58', 73'; Tomasson 78'

Cardiff Arms Park, Cardiff
Attendance: 1,200
Referee: Stephen Lodge (England)

1 July 1995

Næstved (Denmark)	3–3	(Hungary) Békéscsaba
Juel 75'; Kristensen 78'; Mathiesen 89'		Kasik 12'; Majos 34', 68'

Næstved Stadion, Næstved
Attendance: 612
Referee: Sten Johanson (Sweden)

8 July 1995

Békéscsaba (Hungary)	4–0	(Wales) Ton Pentre
Ellacot 25' (o.g.); Kulcsár 35', 36'; Szarvas 45'

Stadion Kórház utcai, Békéscsaba
Attendance: 1,924
Referee: Petar Ianinski (Bulgaria)

8 July 1995

Leiria (Portugal)	1–1	(Denmark) Næstved
Bambo 43'		Mathiesen 57'

Estádio Municipal da Marinha Grande, Marinha Grande
Attendance: 399
Referee: Mike Reed (England)

15 July 1995

Ton Pentre (Wales)	0–3	(Portugal) Leiria
		Telmo Pinto 8', 29'; João Manuel 85'

Cardiff Arms Park, Cardiff
Attendance: 520
Referee: Herbert Barr (Northern Ireland)

15 July 1995

Heerenveen (Netherlands)	4–0	(Hungary) Békéscsaba
Tammer 38', 86'; Regtop 56'; Wouden 82'

Abe Lenstra Stadion, Heerenveen
Attendance: 7,250
Referee: Hans-Jürgen Weber (Germany)

22 July 1995

Næstved (Denmark)	2–0	(Wales) Ton Pentre
Jakobsen 27', 32'

Næstved Stadion, Næstved
Attendance: 378
Referee: Bragi Bergmann (Iceland)

22 July 1995

Leiria (Portugal)	1–0	(Netherlands) Heerenveen
Telmo Pinto 85'

Estádio Municipal da Marinha Grande, Marinha Grande
Attendance: 392
Referee: Didier Pauchard (France)

=== Group 5 ===
Pos	Team	Pld	W	D	L	GF	GA	GD	Pts	Qualification	BOR	ODE	HJK	NOR	BOH
1	(France) Bordeaux	4	3	1	0	13	3	+10	10	Advanced to round of 16	—	4–0	—	6–2	—
2	(Denmark) Odense	4	3	0	1	7	7	0	9	Advanced to round of 16	—	—	2–1	3–2	—
3	(Finland) HJK	4	1	2	1	6	6	0	5		1–1	—	—	—	3–2
4	(Sweden) Norrköping	4	1	1	2	10	10	0	4		—	—	1–1	—	5–0
5	(Republic of Ireland) Bohemians	4	0	0	4	2	12	−10	0		0–2	0–2	—	—	—

Source: rsssf.com
24 June 1995

Bohemians (Republic of Ireland)	0–2	(Denmark) Odense
		Hjorth 20'; Pedersen 74'

Dalymount Park, Dublin
Attendance: 1,510
Referee: Tom Henning Øvrebø (Norway)

25 June 1995

Norrköping (Sweden)	1–1	(Finland) HJK
Sandström 90'		Kottila 74'

Nya Parken, Norrköping
Attendance: 914
Referee: Sven Kjelbrott (Norway)

1 July 1995

Bordeaux (France)	6–2	(Sweden) Norrköping
Tholot 5', 14', 56'; Zidane 6', 64'; Prunier 88'		Jansson 68'; P. Karlsson 73'

Stade Chaban-Delmas, Bordeaux
Attendance: 5,626
Referee: Lawrence Sammut (Malta)

2 July 1995

HJK (Finland)	3–2	(Republic of Ireland) Bohemians
Lius 26', 38'; Heinola 43'		Swan 27'; Markey 86'

Helsinki Olympic Stadium, Helsinki
Attendance: 1,546
Referee: Kim Milton Nielsen (Denmark)

8 July 1995

Odense (Denmark)	2–1	(Finland) HJK
P. Pedersen 51', 60'		Lius 82'

TRE-FOR Park, Odense
Attendance: 1,020
Referee: Andreas Schluchter (Switzerland)

8 July 1995

Bohemians (Republic of Ireland)	0–2	(France) Bordeaux
		Dugarry 43'; Zidane 84'

Dalymount Park, Dublin
Attendance: 1,500
Referee: Alan Howells (Wales)

15 July 1995

Bordeaux (France)	4–0	(Denmark) Odense
Zidane 18'; Prunier 52'; Tholot 56'; Lizarazu 63' (pen.)

Stade Chaban-Delmas, Bordeaux
Attendance: 7,842
Referee: José Núñez Manrique (Spain)

16 July 2015

Norrköping (Sweden)	5–0	(Republic of Ireland) Bohemians
Steiner 15', 48', 80'; Bergort 39'; Blohm 53'

Nya Parken, Norrköping
Attendance: 699
Referee: Marek Kowalczyk (Poland)

22 July 1995

Odense (Denmark)	3–2	(Sweden) Norrköping
Jensen 26', 39', 70'		Persson 10'; P. Karlsson 54'

TRE-FOR Park, Odense
Attendance: 555
Referee: Hugh Dallas (Scotland)

23 July 1995

HJK (Finland)	1–1	(France) Bordeaux
Kottila 78'		Bancarel 81'

Helsinki Olympic Stadium, Helsinki
Attendance: 1,647
Referee: Andrei Butenko (Russia)

=== Group 6 ===
Pos	Team	Pld	W	D	L	GF	GA	GD	Pts	Qualification	MET	LAS	ZAG	PAR	KEF
1	(France) Metz	4	4	0	0	5	1	+4	12	Advanced to round of 16	—	1–0	—	1–0	—
2	(Austria) LASK Linz	4	1	2	1	4	4	0	5		—	—	—	2–2	2–1
3	(Croatia) NK Zagreb	4	1	2	1	2	2	0	5		0–1	0–0	—	—	—
4	(Scotland) Partick Thistle	4	1	1	2	6	6	0	4		—	—	1–2	—	3–1
5	(Iceland) Keflavík	4	0	1	3	3	7	−4	1		1–2	—	0–0	—	—

Source: rsssf.com
25 June 1995

Keflavík (Iceland)	1–2	(France) Metz
Einarsson 8'	Report	Blanchard 56', 73'

Nettovöllurinn, Keflavík
Attendance: 500
Referee: Roland Beck (Liechtenstein)

25 June 1995

LASK Linz (Austria)	2–2	(Scotland) Partick Thistle
Haiden 5'; M. Weissenberger 6'		McDonald 31'; McWilliams 66'

Linzer Stadion, Linz
Attendance: 1,350
Referee: Ľuboš Micheľ (Slovakia)

1 July 1995

Partick Thistle (Scotland)	3–1	(Iceland) Keflavík
Craig 52'; Smith 70', 83'		Tanasic 21'

Firhill Stadium, Glasgow
Attendance: 3,182
Referee: Frank McDonald (Northern Ireland)

2 July 1995

NK Zagreb (Croatia)	0–0	(Austria) LASK Linz
	Report

Stadion Kranjčevićeva, Zagreb
Attendance: 250
Referee: Edgar Steinborn (Germany)

8 July 1995

Metz (France)	1–0	(Scotland) Partick Thistle
Pouget 55'	Report

Stade Saint-Symphorien, Metz
Attendance: 3,905
Referee: Vítor Melo Pereira (Portugal)

8 July 1995

Keflavík (Iceland)	0–0	(Croatia) NK Zagreb
	Report

Nettovöllurinn, Keflavík
Attendance: 200
Referee: Paul Durkin (England)

15 July 1995

LASK Linz (Austria)	2–1	(Iceland) Keflavík
Gussnig 19'; Russ 87'		Sverrisson 12'

Linzer Stadion, Linz
Attendance: 1,800
Referee: Sandor Piller (Hungary)

15 July 1995

NK Zagreb (Croatia)	0–1	(France) Metz
	Report	Blanchard 89'

Stadion Kranjčevićeva, Zagreb
Attendance: 3,650
Referee: Urs Meier (Switzerland)

22 July 1995

Partick Thistle (Scotland)	1–2	(Croatia) NK Zagreb
Curran 85'	Report	Sopić 29'; Džafić 75'

Firhill Stadium, Glasgow
Attendance: 2,588
Referee: Jon Skjervold (Norway)

22 July 1995

Metz (France)	1–0	(Austria) LASK Linz
Pouget 89'	Report

Stade Saint-Symphorien, Metz
Attendance: 622
Referee: Léon Schellings (Belgium)

=== Group 7 ===
Pos	Team	Pld	W	D	L	GF	GA	GD	Pts	Qualification	LEV	OFI	NSF	BUD	PÄR
1	(Germany) Bayer Leverkusen	4	4	0	0	12	1	+11	12	Advanced to round of 16	—	1–0	—	3–0	—
2	(Greece) OFI	4	3	0	1	8	5	+3	9	Advanced to round of 16	—	—	2–1	—	2–0
3	(Cyprus) Nea Salamis Famagusta	4	1	1	2	4	5	−1	4		0–2	—	—	—	2–0
4	(Federal Republic of Yugoslavia) Budućnost	4	1	1	2	7	9	−2	4		—	3–4	1–1	—	—
5	(Estonia) Tervis Pärnu	4	0	0	4	2	13	−11	0		1–6	—	—	1–3	—

Source: rsssf.com
25 June 1995

Tervis Pärnu (Estonia)	1–3	(Federal Republic of Yugoslavia) Budućnost
Staleliunas 84'		Dmitrović 27'; Vukčević 50'; Jovović 89'

Kadriorg Stadium, Tallinn
Attendance: 300
Referee: Juha Hirviniemi (Finland)

25 June 1995

OFI (Greece)	2–1	(Cyprus) Nea Salamis Famagusta
Konstantinidis 7'; Vlachoudis 65'		Adamou 83'

Theodoros Vardinogiannis Stadium, Heraklion
Attendance: 300
Referee: Amit Klein (Israel)

1 July 1995

Nea Salamis Famagusta (Cyprus)	2–0	(Estonia) Tervis Pärnu
Ioannou 26'; Okkas 56'

Ammochostos Stadium, Larnaca
Attendance: 338
Referee: Ion Crăciunescu (Romania)

2 July 1995

Bayer Leverkusen (Germany)	1–0	(Greece) OFI
Kurth 53'

BayArena, Leverkusen
Attendance: 5,300
Referee: Jiří Ulrich (Czech Republic)

8 July 1995

Tervis Pärnu (Estonia)	1–6	(Germany) Bayer Leverkusen
Staleliunas 89'		Barnes 24', 50', 59'; Kurth 41'; Becker 51'; Addo 82'

Kadriorg Stadium, Tallinn
Attendance: 1,000
Referee: Lars Gerner (Denmark)

9 July 1995

Budućnost (Federal Republic of Yugoslavia)	1–1	(Cyprus) Nea Salamis Famagusta
Maraš 10'		Okkas 4'

Partizan Stadium, Belgrade (Note: These matches were played in Belgrade since Budućnost's ground in Podgorica didn't meet UEFA standards.)
Attendance: 500
Referee: Roger Philippi (Luxembourg)

15 July 1995

Bayer Leverkusen (Germany)	3–0	(Federal Republic of Yugoslavia) Budućnost
Völler 27'; Thom 67'; Kirsten 89'

BayArena, Leverkusen
Attendance: 6,100
Referee: Gilles Veissière (France)

15 July 1995

OFI (Greece)	2–0	(Estonia) Tervis Pärnu
Frantzeskos 39', 63'

Theodoros Vardinogiannis Stadium, Heraklion
Attendance: 539
Referee: Charles Agius (Malta)

22 July 1995

Nea Salamis Famagusta (Cyprus)	0–2	(Germany) Bayer Leverkusen
		Paulo Sérgio 6'; Kirsten 14'

Ammochostos Stadium, Larnaca
Attendance: 2,800
Referee: Claude Détruche (Switzerland)

23 July 1995

Budućnost (Federal Republic of Yugoslavia)	3–4	(Greece) OFI
Maraš 65'; Vukčević 71'; Popović 77'		Konstantinidis 33'; Machlas 38'; Frantzeskos 45'; Thomaidis 66'

Partizan Stadium, Belgrade
Attendance: 300
Referee: Alfred Weiser (Austria)

=== Group 8 ===
Pos	Team	Pld	W	D	L	GF	GA	GD	Pts	Qualification	FAR	CAN	DNE	BEČ	POG
1	(Romania) Farul Constanța	4	3	1	0	6	2	+4	10	Advanced to round of 16	—	—	2–0	—	2–1
2	(France) Cannes	4	2	2	0	5	3	+2	8		0–0	—	—	1–0	—
3	(Belarus) Dnepr Mogilev	4	1	2	1	7	8	−1	5		—	2–2	—	2–1	—
4	(Federal Republic of Yugoslavia) Bečej	4	1	0	3	4	6	−2	3		1–2	—	—	—	2–1
5	(Poland) Pogoń Szczecin	4	0	1	3	6	9	−3	1		—	1–2	3–3	—	—

Source: rsssf.com
24 June 1995

Pogoń Szczecin (Poland)	1–2	(France) Cannes
Kaczmarek 55'	Report	Horlaville 23'; Kozniku 76'

Stadion Florian Krygier, Szczecin
Attendance: 4,000
Referee: Nikolai Levnikov (Russia)

24 June 1995

Bečej (Federal Republic of Yugoslavia)	1–2	(Romania) Farul Constanța
Aleksić 63'	Report	Toma 62'; Cornățeanu 90'

Gradski stadion, Bečej
Attendance: 400
Referee: István Vad Sr. (Hungary)

1 July 1995
18:00 UTC+2

Dnepr Mogilev (Belarus)	2–1	(Federal Republic of Yugoslavia) Bečej
Solodukhin 22', 78'	Report	Shuneyka 56' (o.g.)

Dinamo Stadium, Minsk
Attendance: 2,500
Referee: Vesselin Bogdanov (Bulgaria)

1 July 1995

Farul Constanța (Romania)	2–1	(Poland) Pogoń Szczecin
Carabaș 29'; Oprea 73' (pen.)	Report	Moskalewicz 61'

Stadionul Farul, Constanța
Attendance: 3,000
Referee: Stefan Ormandzhiev (Bulgaria)

8 July 1995
17:00 UTC+1

Pogoń Szczecin (Poland)	3–3	(Belarus) Dnepr Mogilev
Dymkowski 31'; Rycak 47'; Rafałowicz 85'	Report	Solodukhin 53'; Skorobogatko 55'; Klimashevsky 59'

Pogoń Stadium, Szczecin
Attendance: 3,500
Referee: Sándor Varga (Hungary)

9 July 1995

Cannes (France)	0–0	(Romania) Farul Constanța
	Report

Stade Pierre de Coubertin, Cannes
Attendance: 6,000
Referee: Ceri Richards (Wales)

15 July 1995
18:00 UTC+2

Dnepr Mogilev (Belarus)	2–2	(France) Cannes
Klimashevsky 17', 45'	Report	Horlaville 7', 10'

Dinamo Stadium, Minsk
Attendance: 2,500
Referee: Volodymyr Pyanykh (Ukraine)

16 July 1995

Bečej (Federal Republic of Yugoslavia)	2–1	(Poland) Pogoń Szczecin
Ćirić 45', 52'		Dymkowski 82'

Gradski stadion, Bečej
Attendance: 246
Referee: Hermann Albrecht (Germany)

22 July 1995
18:00 UTC+1

Farul Constanța (Romania)	2–0	(Belarus) Dnepr Mogilev
Ciurea 22'; Barba 90' (pen.)

Stadionul Farul, Constanța
Attendance: 6,500
Referee: Metin Tokat (Turkey)

23 July 1995

Cannes (France)	1–0	(Federal Republic of Yugoslavia) Bečej
Rodríguez 88'

Stade Pierre de Coubertin, Cannes
Attendance: 1,300
Referee: Antonio Almeida Marcal (Portugal)

=== Group 9 ===
Pos	Team	Pld	W	D	L	GF	GA	GD	Pts	Qualification	CEA	GRO	BEV	BRN	ETA
1	(Romania) Ceahlăul	4	3	1	0	6	0	+6	10	Advanced to round of 16	—	—	—	2–0	2–0
2	(Netherlands) Groningen	4	2	2	0	7	3	+4	8		0–0	—	—	—	3–0
3	(Belgium) Beveren	4	1	1	2	6	8	−2	4		0–2	2–2	—	—	—
4	(Czechoslovakia) Boby Brno	4	1	0	3	6	9	−3	3		—	1–2	3–2	—	—
5	(Bulgaria) Etar Veliko Tarnovo	4	1	0	3	4	9	−5	3		—	—	1–2	3–2	—

Source: rsssf.com
24 June 1995

Boby Brno (Czech Republic)	1–2	(Netherlands) Groningen
Dostálek 82'		Bombarda 34'; Sion 54'

Stadion Za Lužánkami, Brno
Attendance: 4,741
Referee: Hartmut Strampe (Germany)

25 June 1995

Ceahlăul (Romania)	2–0	(Bulgaria) Etar Veliko Tarnovo
Ionescu 67' (pen.); Enache 84'

Stadionul Ceahlăul, Piatra Neamț
Attendance: 1,127
Referee: Anastasios Papaioannou (Cyprus)

1 July 1995

Beveren (Belgium)	0–2	(Romania) Ceahlăul
		Enache 4'; Axinia 32'

Freethiel Stadion, Beveren
Attendance: 1,500
Referee: Tomasz Mikulski (Poland)

2 July 1995

Etar Veliko Tarnovo (Bulgaria)	3–2	(Czech Republic) Boby Brno
Nikolov 17'; Kolev 57'; Georgiev 64'		Maléř 26'; Kukleta 76'

Stadion Ivaylo, Veliko Tarnovo
Attendance: 845
Referee: Athanasios Zachariadis (Greece)

8 July 1995

Boby Brno (Czech Republic)	3–2	(Belgium) Beveren
Wagner 19', 26'; Dostálek 70'		Goots 23'; Udovič 38'

Stadion Za Lužánkami, Brno
Attendance: 3,721
Referee: Milan Mitrović (Slovenia)

9 July 1995

Groningen (Netherlands)	3–0	(Bulgaria) Etar Veliko Tarnovo
Bombarda 11', 90'; Gorré 79'

Stadion Oosterpark, Groningen
Attendance: 2,904
Referee: Claude Colombo (France)

15 July 1995

Beveren (Belgium)	2–2	(Netherlands) Groningen
Goots 32'; Udovič 59'		Gorré 12'; Beerens 67' (pen.)

Freethiel Stadion, Beveren
Attendance: 1,006
Referee: Kurt Zuppinger (Switzerland)

16 July 1995

Ceahlăul (Romania)	2–0	(Czech Republic) Boby Brno
Ionescu 58'; Enache 88'

Stadionul Ceahlăul, Piatra Neamț
Attendance: 1,367
Referee: Oğuz Sarvan (Turkey)

22 July 1995

Etar Veliko Tarnovo (Bulgaria)	1–2	(Belgium) Beveren
Nikolov 12'		Goots 60', 73'

Stadion Ivaylo, Veliko Tarnovo
Attendance: 1,000
Referee: Günter Benkö (Austria)

23 July 1995

Groningen (Netherlands)	0–0	(Romania) Ceahlăul

Stadion Oosterpark, Groningen
Attendance: 6,891
Referee: Joseph Byrne (Ireland)

=== Group 10 ===
Pos	Team	Pld	W	D	L	GF	GA	GD	Pts	Qualification	BUR	KOŠ	CHA	WIM	BEI
1	(Turkey) Bursaspor	4	3	1	0	9	1	+8	10	Advanced to round of 16	—	1–1	—	—	2–0
2	(Slovakia) Košice	4	2	2	0	10	7	+3	8		—	—	3–2	1–1	—
3	(Belgium) Charleroi	4	2	0	2	6	5	+1	6		0–2	—	—	3–0	—
4	(England) Wimbledon	4	0	2	2	1	8	−7	2		0–4	—	—	—	0–0
5	(Israel) Beitar Jerusalem	4	0	1	3	3	8	−5	1		—	3–5	0–1	—	—

Source: rsssf.com
24 June 1995

Wimbledon (England)	0–4	(Turkey) Bursaspor
	Report	Ercüment 6', 55'; Kılıç 27'; Ünal 78'

Goldstone Ground, Hove (Note: These matches were played at Brighton & Hove Albion's Goldstone Ground as Selhurst Park was unavailable.)
Attendance: 1,879
Referee: Roy Helge Olsen (Norway)

24 June 1995

Beitar Jerusalem (Israel)	0–1	(Belgium) Charleroi
		Balog 56'

Teddy Stadium, Jerusalem
Attendance: 800
Referee: Stelios Charlabanis (Greece)

1 July 1995

Bursaspor (Turkey)	2–0	(Israel) Beitar Jerusalem
Ercüment 47'; Musisi 90'	Report

Bursa Atatürk Stadium, Bursa
Attendance: 13,534
Referee: Sergo Kvaratskhelia (Georgia)

2 July 1995

Košice (Slovakia)	1–1	(England) Wimbledon
Weiss 47'	Report	Piper 59'

Všešportový areál, Košice
Attendance: 4,023
Referee: Lennart Elofsson (Sweden)

8 July 1995

Beitar Jerusalem (Israel)	3–5	(Slovakia) Košice
Sallói 7', 28'; Czéh 52'		Dina 16', 39', 49' (pen.); Gostič 75', 82'

Teddy Stadium, Jerusalem
Attendance: 610
Referee: Valeriy Onufer (Ukraine)

9 July 1995

Charleroi (Belgium)	0–2	(Turkey) Bursaspor
	Report	Şaban 84'; Musisi 87'

Stade du Mambourg, Charleroi
Attendance: 7,214
Referee: Marcus Merk (Germany)

15 July 1995

Wimbledon (England)	0–0	(Israel) Beitar Jerusalem
	Report

Goldstone Ground, Hove
Attendance: 702
Referee: Alain Sars (France)

16 July 1995

Košice (Slovakia)	3–2	(Belgium) Charleroi
Kozák 9'; Pančík 13'; Semeník 51'		Gérard 56'; Fiers 87'

Všešportový areál, Košice
Attendance: 2,483
Referee: Karl Finzinger (Austria)

22 July 1995

Bursaspor (Turkey)	1–1	(Slovakia) Košice
Ercüment 47'	Report	Semeník 51'

Bursa Atatürk Stadium, Bursa
Attendance: 11,784
Referee: Aron Huzu (Romania)

22 July 1995

Charleroi (Belgium)	3–0	(England) Wimbledon
Brogno 48'; Missé-Missé 52'; Balog 61'	Report

Stade du Mambourg, Charleroi
Attendance: 2,014
Referee: José Joâo Mendes Pratas (Portugal)

=== Group 11 ===
Pos	Team	Pld	W	D	L	GF	GA	GD	Pts	Qualification	STR	TIR	GEN	HPT	FLO
1	(France) Strasbourg	4	3	1	0	12	1	+11	10	Advanced to round of 16	—	4–0	4–1	—	—
2	(Austria) Tirol Innsbruck	4	3	0	1	9	6	+3	9	Advanced to round of 16	—	—	3–2	2–0	—
3	(Turkey) Gençlerbirliği	4	2	0	2	10	7	+3	6		—	—	—	4–0	3–0
4	(Israel) Hapoel Petah Tikva	4	0	2	2	1	7	−6	2		0–0	—	—	—	1–1
5	(Malta) Floriana	4	0	1	3	1	12	−11	1		0–4	0–4	—	—	—

Source: rsssf.com
25 June 1995

Floriana (Malta)	0–4	(Austria) Tirol Innsbruck
	Report	Streiter 9' (pen.); Cerny 27'; Kirchler 31', 90'

Gozo Stadium, Gozo
Attendance: 1,375
Referee: Werner Müller (Switzerland)

25 June 1995

Gençlerbirliği (Turkey)	4–0	(Israel) Hapoel Petah Tikva
Diyadin 41'; Özdemir 46'; Ertan 52'; Dalçiçek 75'	Report

19 Mayıs Stadium, Ankara
Attendance: 8,252
Referee: Adrian Porumboiu (Romania)

1 July 1995

Hapoel Petah Tikva (Israel)	1–1	(Malta) Floriana
Maya 45' (pen.)	Report	Buhagiar 25' (pen.)

Municipal Stadium, Petah Tikva
Attendance: 378
Referee: Michael Ioannou (Cyprus)

1 July 1995

Strasbourg (France)	4–1	(Turkey) Gençlerbirliği
Baticle 30'; Mostovoi 49', 88'; Zitelli 50'	Report	Özdemir 79'

Stade de la Meinau, Strasbourg
Attendance: 10,380
Referee: Marnix Sandra (Belgium)

8 July 1995

Tirol Innsbruck (Austria)	2–0	(Israel) Hapoel Petah Tikva
Streiter 35' (pen.); Cerny 57'	Report

Tivoli, Innsbruck
Attendance: 1,075
Referee: Jürgen Aust (Germany)

9 July 1995

Floriana (Malta)	0–4	(France) Strasbourg
	Report	Leboeuf 23'; Sauzée 31'; Keller 58'; Mostovoi 59'

Gozo Stadium, Gozo
Attendance: 1,000
Referee: Bujar Pregja (Albania)

15 July 1995

Strasbourg (France)	4–0	(Austria) Tirol Innsbruck
Sauzée 7', 65'; Keller 15'; Leboeuf 26' (pen.)	Report

Stade de la Meinau, Strasbourg
Attendance: 8,530
Referee: Zbigniew Przesmycki (Poland)

16 July 1995

Gençlerbirliği (Turkey)	3–0	(Malta) Floriana
Özdemir 28'; Diyadin 43'; Işık 55'	Report

19 Mayıs Stadium, Ankara
Attendance: 6,400
Referee: Gennady Yakubovsky (Belarus)

22 July 1995

Hapoel Petah Tikva (Israel)	0–0	(France) Strasbourg
	Report

Municipal Stadium, Petah Tikva
Attendance: 1,500
Referee: Theodoros Kefalas (Greece)

22 July 1995

Tirol Innsbruck (Austria)	3–2	(Turkey) Gençlerbirliği
Zafer 29' (o.g.); Schiener 35'; Kitzbichler 49'	Report	Özdemir 45', 70'

Tivoli, Innsbruck
Attendance: 3,850
Referee: Herman Van Dijk (Netherlands)

=== Group 12 ===
Pos	Team	Pld	W	D	L	GF	GA	GD	Pts	Qualification	VOR	EIN	SPP	IRA	PAN
1	(Austria) Vorwärts Steyr	4	3	1	0	8	2	+6	10	Advanced to round of 16	—	—	2–0	3–0	—
2	(Germany) Eintracht Frankfurt	4	3	0	1	14	3	+11	9	Advanced to round of 16	1–2	—	—	5–1	—
3	(Bulgaria) Spartak Plovdiv	4	1	1	2	3	6	−3	4		—	0–4	—	—	3–0
4	(Greece) Iraklis	4	1	1	2	4	9	−5	4		—	—	0–0	—	3–1
5	(Lithuania) Panerys Vilnius	4	0	1	3	2	11	−9	1		1–1	0–4	—	—	—

Source: rsssf.com
24 June 1995

Spartak Plovdiv (Bulgaria)	0–4	(Germany) Eintracht Frankfurt
		Binz 11'; Legat 14'; Dickhaut 39'; Furtok 76'

Stadion Todor Diev, Plovdiv
Attendance: 1,698
Referee: Vladimír Hriňák (Slovakia)

24 June 1995

Vorwärts Steyr (Austria)	3–0	(Greece) Iraklis
Barac 34'; Azima 48'; Westerthaler 79'

Vorwärts Stadium, Steyr
Attendance: 450
Referee: René Temmink (Netherlands)

1 July 1995

Panerys Vilnius (Lithuania)	1–1	(Austria) Vorwärts Steyr
Ražanauskas 80'		Madlener 58'

Panerys Stadium, Vilnius
Attendance: 800
Referee: Karl-Erik Nilsson (Sweden)

2 July 1995

Iraklis (Greece)	0–0	(Bulgaria) Spartak Plovdiv

Kaftanzoglio Stadium, Thessaloniki
Attendance: 124
Referee: Géza Kiss (Hungary)

8 July 1995

Spartak Plovdiv (Bulgaria)	3–0	(Lithuania) Panerys Vilnius
Nikolov 7', 43'; Adamyan 57'

Stadion Todor Diev, Plovdiv
Attendance: 300
Referee: Gheorge Constantin (Romania)

8 July 1995

Eintracht Frankfurt (Germany)	5–1	(Greece) Iraklis
Okocha 26', 64', 80'; Binz 43'; Bindewald 54'		Papadopoulos 19'

Waldstadion, Frankfurt
Attendance: 6,500
Referee: Karel Bohuněk (Czech Republic)

15 July 1995

Panerys Vilnius (Lithuania)	0–4	(Germany) Eintracht Frankfurt
		Schupp 23'; Rauffmann 28'; Aničić 89'; Bindewald 90'

Panerys Stadium, Vilnius
Attendance: 815
Referee: Sergey Shmolik (Belarus)

16 July 1995

Vorwärts Steyr (Austria)	2–0	(Bulgaria) Spartak Plovdiv
Madlener 48'; Westerthaler 60'

Vorwärts Stadium, Steyr
Attendance: 1,112
Referee: Eric Blareau (Belgium)

22 July 1995

Iraklis (Greece)	3–1	(Lithuania) Panerys Vilnius
Borbokis 37', 84'; Mitropoulos 90'		Morinas 26'

Kaftanzoglio Stadium, Thessaloniki
Attendance: 250
Referee: Haïm Lipkovitz (Israel)

23 July 1995

Eintracht Frankfurt (Germany)	1–2	(Austria) Vorwärts Steyr
Komljenović 85'		Linzmaier 45'; Westerthaler 57'

Waldstadion, Frankfurt
Attendance: 6,000
Referee: Juan Fernández Marin (Spain)

=== Ranking of second-placed teams ===
Pos	Grp	Team	Pld	W	D	L	GF	GA	GD	Pts	Qualification
1	12	(Germany) Eintracht Frankfurt	4	3	0	1	14	3	+11	9	Advance to round of 16
2	11	(Austria) Tirol Innsbruck	4	3	0	1	9	6	+3	9	Advance to round of 16
3	7	(Greece) OFI	4	3	0	1	8	5	+3	9	Advance to round of 16
4	5	(Denmark) Odense	4	3	0	1	7	7	0	9	Advance to round of 16
5	3	(Belgium) Germinal Ekeren	4	2	2	0	10	5	+5	8	
6	9	(Netherlands) Groningen	4	2	2	0	7	3	+4	8	
6	4	(Portugal) Leiria	4	2	2	0	7	3	+4	8	
8	10	(Slovakia) Košice	4	2	2	0	10	7	+3	8	
9	2	(Switzerland) Luzern	4	2	2	0	8	5	+3	8	
10	8	(France) Cannes	4	2	2	0	5	3	+2	8	
11	1	(England) Sheffield Wednesday	4	2	1	1	7	5	+2	7	
12	6	(Austria) LASK Linz	4	1	2	1	4	4	0	5	

Source: RSSSF
Rules for classification: 1) Points; 2) Goal difference; 3) Goals scored.

== Round of 16 ==
=== Summary ===
Team 1	Score	Team 2
Strasbourg (France)	4–0	(Austria) Vorwärts Steyr
Ceahlăul (Romania)	0–2	(France) Metz
Heerenveen (Netherlands)	4–0	(Romania) Farul Constanța
Köln (Germany)	1–3	(Austria) Tirol Innsbruck
Bayer Leverkusen (Germany)	5–2	(Denmark) Odense
Bordeaux (France)	3–0	(Germany) Eintracht Frankfurt
Aarau (Switzerland)	1–2 (a.e.t.)	(Germany) Karlsruhe
Bursaspor (Turkey)	2–1	(Greece) OFI

=== Matches ===
29 July 1995

Strasbourg (France)	4–0	(Austria) Vorwärts Steyr
Sauzée 33', 84'; Keller 72', 90'	Report

Stade de la Meinau, Strasbourg
Attendance: 9,000
Referee: Dimitar Momirov (Bulgaria)

29 July 1995

Ceahlăul (Romania)	0–2	(France) Metz
	Report	Blanchard 70'; Meyrignac 90'

Stadionul Ceahlăul, Piatra Neamţ
Attendance: 12,000
Referee: Andrew Waddell (Scotland)

29 July 1995

Heerenveen (Netherlands)	4–0	(Romania) Farul Constanța
Regtop 19', 35'; Tomasson 48'; Wouden 71'	Report

Abe Lenstra Stadion, Heerenveen
Attendance: 5,000
Referee: Martin Bodenham (England)

29 July 1995

Köln (Germany)	1–3	(Austria) Tirol Innsbruck
Munteanu 35'	Report	Cerny 23', 44', 56'

Müngersdorfer Stadion, Cologne
Attendance: 6,500
Referee: Gilles Veissière (France)

29 July 1995

Bayer Leverkusen (Germany)	5–2	(Denmark) Odense
Völler 39' (pen.); Lehnhoff 45'; Kirsten 67'; Paulo Sérgio 88', 90'	Report	P. Pedersen 3'; U. Pedersen 73'

Ulrich-Haberland-Stadion, Leverkusen
Attendance: 7,800
Referee: Zbigniew Przesmycki (Poland)

29 July 1995

Bordeaux (France)	3–0	(Germany) Eintracht Frankfurt
Lucas 49'; Dutuel 61'; Zidane 83'	Report

Stade Chaban-Delmas, Bordeaux
Attendance: 11,000
Referee: Léon Schelings (Belgium)

29 July 1995

Aarau (Switzerland)	1–2 (a.e.t.)	(Germany) Karlsruhe
Saibene 90+'	Report	Schuster 87'; Knup 97'

Stadion Brügglifeld, Aarau
Attendance: 6,700
Referee: António José Almeida Marçal (Portugal)

29 July 1995

Bursaspor (Turkey)	2–1	(Greece) OFI
Ercüment 10'; Levent 44'	Report	Frantzeskos 1'

Bursa Atatürk Stadium, Bursa
Attendance: 17,281
Referee: Kim Milton Nielsen (Denmark)

== Quarter-finals ==
=== Summary ===
Team 1	Score	Team 2
Bordeaux (France)	2–0	(Netherlands) Heerenveen
Tirol Innsbruck (Austria)	2–2 (a.e.t.) (5–4 p)	(Germany) Bayer Leverkusen
Bursaspor (Turkey)	3–3 (a.e.t.) (5–6 p)	(Germany) Karlsruhe
Metz (France)	0–2	(France) Strasbourg

=== Matches ===
2 August 1995

Bordeaux (France)	2–0	(Netherlands) Heerenveen
Dutuel 51'; Lizarazu 70'	Report

Stade Chaban-Delmas, Bordeaux
Attendance: 12,830
Referee: Günter Benkö (Austria)

2 August 1995

Bursaspor (Turkey)	3–3 (a.e.t.)	(Germany) Karlsruhe
Baljić 56'; Musisi 80'; Ercüment 98'	Report	Häßler 26'; Şaban 66' (o.g.); Wittwer 113'
Penalties
Levent (penalty scored); Baljić (penalty scored); Ercüment (penalty scored); Musisi (penalty scored); Ganchev (penalty scored); Şengül (penalty missed)	5–6	(penalty scored) Bilić; (penalty scored) Knup; (penalty scored) Bender; (penalty scored) Dundee; (penalty scored) Häßler; (penalty scored) Tarnat

Bursa Atatürk Stadium, Bursa
Attendance: 30,000
Referee: Graziano Cesari (Italy)

2 August 1995

Metz (France)	0–2	(France) Strasbourg
	Report	Sauzée 78'; Mostovoi 90'

Stade Saint-Symphorien, Metz
Attendance: 12,830
Referee: Juan Manuel Brito Arceo (Spain)

2 August 1995

Tirol Innsbruck (Austria)	2–2 (a.e.t.)	(Germany) Bayer Leverkusen
Streiter 31' (pen.); Baur 84'	Report	Ramon 24'; Völler 49'
Penalties
Cerny (penalty scored); Brzęczek (penalty scored); Grüner (penalty scored); Baur (penalty scored); Streiter (penalty scored)	5–3	(penalty missed) Paulo Sérgio; (penalty scored) Lupescu; (penalty scored) Neuendorf; (penalty scored) Schuster

Tivoli, Innsbruck
Attendance: 10,000
Referee: Leif Sundell (Sweden)

== Semi-finals (part of UEFA Cup) ==
The semi-finals were part of the 1995–96 UEFA Cup preliminary round. The ties determined the two champions of the 1995 UEFA Intertoto Cup, as no final was held. The winning semi-finalists advanced to the UEFA Cup first round.

=== Summary ===
Team 1	Agg.	Team 2	1st leg	2nd leg
Tirol Innsbruck (Austria)	2–7	(France) Strasbourg	1–1	1–6
Karlsruhe (Germany)	2–4	(France) Bordeaux	0–2	2–2

=== Matches ===
8 August 1995
20:20

Tirol Innsbruck (Austria)	1–1	(France) Strasbourg
Schiener 62'	Report	Sauzée 26'

Tivoli, Innsbruck
Attendance: 8,300
Referee: Michael Donald Reed (England)
22 August 1995
18:00

Strasbourg (France)	6–1	(Austria) Tirol Innsbruck
Sauzée 16', 55'; Mostovoi 66'; Keller 67', 71', 90+2'	Report	Kirchler 51'

Stade de la Meinau, Strasbourg
Attendance: 13,550
Referee: Frans van den Wijngaert (Belgium)

Strasbourg won 7–2 on aggregate.

8 August 1995
20:30

Karlsruhe (Germany)	0–2	(France) Bordeaux
	Report	Dugarry 41'; Dutuel 88'

Wildparkstadion, Karlsruhe
Attendance: 16,000
Referee: Antonio Jesús López Nieto (Spain)
22 August 1995
20:30

Bordeaux (France)	2–2	(Germany) Karlsruhe
Lizarazu 2' (pen.), 10'	Report	Fink 40'; Schmitt 87'

Parc Lescure, Bordeaux
Attendance: 20,000
Referee: Pierluigi Pairetto (Italy)

Bordeaux won 4–2 on aggregate.

== See also ==
- 1995–96 UEFA Champions League
- 1995–96 UEFA Cup
