= 1997 U.S. Cup =

- Genre: Sporting Event
- Date: January
- Venue: Jack Murphy Stadium
- Location: San Diego
- Country: United States
- Participants: United States; Denmark; Mexico; Peru

The 1997 U.S. Cup was a United States Soccer Federation (USSF) organized tournament held in January 1997. USSF had hosted the annual U.S. Cup since 1992, except for the FIFA World Cup years of 1994 and 1998 when no tournament took place. The 1997 U.S. Cup included the host United States, Mexico, Peru and Denmark. Staged as a six-game, round robin tournament, the team with the best win–loss record took the title. This was the only U.S. Cup for both Peru and Denmark, and the third for Mexico. They had won the previous cup and would go on to win this one and the 1999 edition.

USSF organized the 1997 cup as three doubleheaders. On January 17, 1997, Denmark played Mexico and the U.S. played Peru. Two days later, Peru took on Denmark, while the U.S. played arch-rival Mexico. On the last day of the cup, January 22, Mexico played Peru and the U.S. hosted Denmark.

== January 17: First Doubleheader ==
In the first game of the tournament, the U.S. took on Peru in San Diego's Jack Murphy Stadium. Peru struck early, when German Carty scored in the 8th minute off a Paolo Maldonado cross. Peru dominated the first half possession, but the U.S. dominated long stretches of the second half. The U.S. had several good chances, but was unable to score on any of them.

January 17, 1997

United States	0–1	Peru
	(Report)	8' Carty

Jack Murphy Stadium
Attendance: 35,232
Referee: Carter (Mexico)

United States: Brad Friedel, Mike Burns, Jeff Agoos, Alexi Lalas, Joe-Max Moore, Preki (Cobi Jones 78'), Claudio Reyna, Frankie Hejduk (Jason Kreis 60'), Brian McBride, Steve Ralston (Jovan Kirovski 55'), Roy Lassiter

Peru: Julio César Balerio, Alfonso Dulanto, Juan Reynoso, Percy Olivares, Nolberto Solano, Roger Serrano, Juan Jayo, Paolo Maldonado, José Pereda, Alex Magallanes (Waldir Sáenz 58'), Germán Carty (Robert Farfán 68')

In the second game, Mexico defeated Denmark 3-1.

January 17, 1997

Denmark	1–3	Mexico
Nielsen 64'	Report	41' Alfaro; 59' Hernández; 72' Hermosillo

Jack Murphy Stadium
Attendance: ?
Referee: ?

Denmark: Mogens Krogh, Søren Colding, Michael Hemmingsen, Jens Jessen, Per Nielsen, Kim Daugaard (Peter Frank 76'), Bjarne Goldbæk, Brian Steen Nielsen, Stig Tøfting (Jesper Thygesen 46'), Miklos Molnar (Søren Andersen 69'), Per Pedersen (Peter Møller 52')

Mexico: ?

== January 19: Second Doubleheader ==
In the first game of the day, Denmark came back from its loss to Mexico to defeat Peru 2-1 in its January 19 game in Pasadena's Rose Bowl. The Peruvian team had a hard time converting their technical superiority into goals, partly due to Danish goalkeeper Mogens Krogh.

January 19, 1997

Denmark	2–1	Peru
Andersen 8'; Colding 81'	(Report)	50' Solano

Rose Bowl
Attendance: 15,000
Referee: Kevin Scott (USA)

Denmark: Mogens Krogh, Søren Colding, Peter Frank (Jens Jessen 46'), Michael Hemmingsen, Steen Nedergaard, Per Nielsen, Bjarne Goldbæk (Ulrik Pedersen 60'), Brian Steen Nielsen (Stig Tøfting 75'), Jesper Thygesen, Søren Andersen, Peter Møller

Peru: ?

In the second game of the doubleheader, Mexico easily defeated the U.S. In the third minute, Alberto Garcia Aspe assisted on a goal by Luís Roberto Alves. In the 71st minute, Aspe bagged a goal for himself. Mexico stripped the ball from the U.S. and, using several quick passes, Aspe received the ball and placed a rocket shot past Brad Friedel from 25 yards out. With the win, Mexico defeated the U.S. for the first time on American soil since 1974.

January 19, 1997

United States	0–2	Mexico
	(Report)	3' Alves; 71' Aspe

Rose Bowl
Attendance: 31,725
Referee: Kevin Skinner (Canada)

United States: Brad Friedel, Mike Burns, Jeff Agoos, Alexi Lalas, Cobi Jones, Jovan Kirovski, Martin Vasquez (Preki 50'), Jason Kreis (Frankie Hejduk 53'), Claudio Reyna, Joe-Max Moore, Brian McBride (Roy Lassiter 66')

Mexico: Adolfo Ríos, Pavel Pardo, Claudio Suárez, Duilio Davino, Ramón Ramírez, Alberto Coyote, Alberto García Aspe (Marcelino Bernal 74'), Benjamín Galindo, Enrique Alfaro (Nicolás Ramírez 83'), Carlos Hermosillo (Luis García 68'), Luís Roberto Alves (Luis Hernández 54')

== January 22: Third Doubleheader ==
Per Pedersen put on a goal scoring clinic as Denmark crushed the U.S. 4-1. Pedersen scored all four of Denmark's goals, three in the first half. While the U.S. maintained possession for long periods of time, they were unable to break into the last half of the field. Denmark on the other hand, allowed the U.S. to expend its energy on pointless play, then would strip the U.S. of the ball and easily move into counterattacks. Joe-Max Moore became the only U.S. player to score in this cup when he hit a 25-yard free kick in the 44th minute.

January 22, 1997

United States	1–4	Denmark
Moore 45'	(Report)	Pedersen 16', 26', 45', 55'

Rose Bowl
Attendance: 17,342
Referee: unknown

United States: Brad Friedel (Mark Dodd 46'), Jeff Agoos, Dan Calichman, Alexi Lalas, Mike Burns, Steve Ralston (Jason Kreis 57'), Claudio Reyna, Joe-Max Moore, Cobi Jones, Jovan Kirovski (Preki 63'), Roy Lassiter (Brian McBride 33')

Denmark: Mogens Krogh, Søren Colding, Michael Hemmingsen, Per Nielsen, Jens Jessen, Steen Nedergaard, Brian Steen Nielsen (Kim Daugaard 79'), Jesper Thygesen, Ulrik Pedersen (Stig Tøfting 71'), Søren Andersen (Miklos Molnar 66'), Per Pedersen (Peter Møller 87')

In the second, and decisive game, Mexico cruised to an easy 0-0 tie with Peru. With the point it earned from the tie, Mexico topped the standings and took its second consecutive U.S. Cup title.

January 22, 1997

Mexico	0–0 (global 2-1)	Peru
	(Report)

Rose Bowl
Attendance: 17,342
Referee: Esfandiar Baharmast (USA)

== Champion ==
1997 Nike U.S. Cup Winner:

Mexico
Second title

== Scorers ==
Four goals

- (Denmark) Per Pedersen

One goal

- (Denmark) Søren Andersen
- (Denmark) Søren Colding
- (Denmark) Brian Steen Nielsen
- (Mexico) Enrique Alfaro
- (Mexico) Alberto García Aspe
- (Mexico) Luís Roberto Alves
- (Mexico) Luis Hernandez
- (Mexico) Carlos Hermosillo
- (Peru) Germán Carty
- (Peru) Nolberto Solano
- (United States) Joe-Max Moore

== Final rankings ==
Team		Pts	GP	W	T	L	GF	GA	Dif	%
1	Mexico	7	3	2	1	0	5	1	+4	77.8%
2	Denmark	6	3	2	0	1	7	5	+2	66.7%
3	Peru	4	3	1	1	1	2	2	0	44.4%
4	United States	0	3	0	0	3	1	7	-6	00,0%
