= 2001–02 Taça de Portugal =

Tournament details
- Country: Portugal
- Dates: 2 September 2001 – 12 May 2002
- Teams: 230

Final positions
- Champions: Sporting CP (13th title)
- Runners-up: Leixões

Tournament statistics
- Top goal scorer: Mário Jardel (7 goals)

The 2001–02 Taça de Portugal was the 62nd edition of the Portuguese football knockout tournament, organized by the Portuguese Football Federation (FPF). The 2001–02 Taça de Portugal began on 2 September 2001. The final was played on 12 May 2002 at the Estádio Nacional.

Porto were the previous holders, having defeated Marítimo 2–0 in the previous season's final. Defending champions Porto were eliminated in the quarter-finals by Braga. Sporting CP defeated Leixões, 1–0 in the final to win their thirteenth Taça de Portugal. As a result of Sporting CP winning both the league and cup in the same season, cup finalists Leixões would play the Leões in the 2002 Supertaça Cândido de Oliveira.

== First round ==
For the first round draw, teams were drawn against each other in accordance to their geographical location. The draw was split up into four sections: teams from the north, the center, the south and the Azores region. All first round cup ties were played on the 2 September. Ties which ended in a draw were replayed on the 12 September. Due to the odd number of teams at this stage of the competition, Guadalupe progressed to the next round due to having no opponent to face at this stage of the competition. The first round of the cup saw teams from the Terceira Divisão (IV) start the competition alongside some teams who registered to participate in the cup from the Portuguese District Leagues (V).

=== North Zone ===
Home team	Score	Away team
Amarante (IV)	5–0	Cerveira (V)
Amares (IV)	4–1	Águias da Graça (IV)
Avintes (IV)	3–1	Valdevez (IV)
Fafe (IV)	2–4	Dragões Sandinenses (IV)
Juventude de Ronfe (IV)	1–4	Tirsense (IV)
Lousada (IV)	2–1	Terras de Bouro (V)
Lusitânia Lourosa (IV)	7–1	Ucha (V)
Merelinense (IV)	0–4	Lamego (IV)
Montalegre (IV)	0–1	Torre de Moncorvo (IV)
Pedrouços (IV)	3–1	Fão (IV)

Home team	Score	Away team
Pevidém (IV)	1–0 (aet)	Cambres (IV)
Régua (V)	4–1	Nogueirense (IV)
Rio Tinto (IV)	5–0	Limianos (IV)
São Pedro da Cova (V)	1–0	Trofense (IV)
Serzedelo (IV)	3–4 (aet)	Ribeirão (IV)
Valenciano (IV)	1–0	Rebordosa (IV)
Valpaços (IV)	0–1	Monção (IV)
Vianense (IV)	2–0	UD Valonguense (IV)
Vilaverdense (IV)	2–0	Maria da Fonte (IV)
Vinhais (V)	0–7	Macedo de Cavaleiros (IV)

=== Central Zone ===
Home team	Score	Away team
Águeda (IV)	1–2	Esmoriz (IV)
Ala-Arriba (IV)	0–1	Milieu Guarda (IV)
Alcobaça (IV)	6–3	Teixosense (IV)
Alqueidão da Serra (IV)	2–2 (aet)	União Almeirim (IV)
Atlético Cucujães (IV)	2–2 (aet)	Mangualde (IV)
Cadima (V)	1–3	Anadia (IV)
Caranguejeira (IV)	3–0	Gafanha (IV)
Cinfães (V)	1–2	Lourinhanense (IV)
Estação (V)	2–1 (aet)	Avanca (IV)
Estarreja (IV)	5–1	Arouca (IV)
Figueirense (V)	2–1	União da Serra (V)

Home team	Score	Away team
Fornos de Algodres (IV)	6–0	Elvenses (V)
Mirense (IV)	4–1	Cartaxo (V)
Penalva do Castelo (IV)	3–0	Mirandense (IV)
Peniche (IV)	2–2 (aet)	Cesarense (IV)
Portomosense (IV)	1–0	Canedo (V)
São Roque (IV)	2–3 (aet)	Milheiroense (IV)
Sertanense (IV)	0–0 (aet)	Portalegrense (IV)
Torres Novas (IV)	1–1 (aet)	Riachense (IV)
União de Tomar (IV)	0–2	Bidoeirense (IV)
Valecambrense (IV)	1–3	Estrela Portalegre (IV)
Vitória de Sernache (IV)	3–0	Sátão (IV)

==== Replays ====
Home team	Score	Away team
Mangualde (IV)	1–1 (aet, p. 4–3)	Atlético Cucujães (IV)
Cesarense (IV)	2–1	Peniche (IV)
Portalegrense (IV)	1–3	Sertanense (IV)

Home team	Score	Away team
Riachense (IV)	0–1	Torres Novas (V)
União Almeirim (IV)	2–3 (aet)	Alqueidão da Serra (IV)

=== South Zone ===
Home team	Score	Away team
1º Maio Funchal (V)	4–2	Bencatelense (V)
Aldenovense (IV)	0–1	Ourique (IV)
Arrentela (V)	2–0	Lusitano de Évora (IV)
Camarate (IV)	4–3	Coruchense (IV)
Desportivo de Beja (IV)	3–0	Santana (IV)
Estrela Vendas Novas (IV)	1–1 (aet)	Vasco da Gama Sines (IV)
Fazendense (IV)	1–1 (aet)	Pinhalnovense (IV)
Fornos de Algodres (IV)	6–0	Elvenses (V)
Futebol Benfica (IV)	2–4 (aet)	Sintrense (IV)
Juventude Évora (IV)	1–2 (aet)	Mafra (IV)
Loures (IV)	3–0	Lagoa (V)

Home team	Score	Away team
Montijo (IV)	0–1 (aet)	Esperança de Lagos (IV)
Oriental (IV)	3–0	Almancilense (IV)
Pescadores (IV)	2–2 (aet)	Silves (IV)
Portosantense (IV)	2–1	Alcochetense (IV)
Sacavenense (IV)	5–0	Serpa (V)
Samora Correia (IV)	1–3	Carregado (IV)
Santacruzense (V)	2–1	Avisenses (IV)
São Vicente (IV)	2–1	Ribeira Brava (IV)
Sesimbra (IV)	0–1	Pontassolense (IV)
União de Montemor (IV)	1–0 (aet)	Quarteirense (IV)
União de Tires (V)	0–0 (aet)	Lusitano VRSA (IV)

==== Replays ====
Home team	Score	Away team
Vasco da Gama Sines (IV)	1–0	Estrela Vendas Novas (IV)
Pinhalnovense (IV)	4–0	Fazendense (IV)

Home team	Score	Away team
Silves (IV)	2–1	Pescadores (IV)
Lusitano VRSA (IV)	6–0	União de Tires (V)

=== Azores Zone ===
Home team	Score	Away team
Águia (IV)	2–0	Boavista São Mateus (V)
Angrense (IV)	0–2	Praiense (IV)
Boavista Ribeirinha (IV)	2–5 (aet)	Fayal (IV)

Home team	Score	Away team
Santiago (IV)	3–1	Flamengos (IV)
Santo António (IV)	0–1	União Micaelense (IV)
Vasco da Gama (V)	2–16	Madalena (IV)

== Second round ==
For the second round draw, teams were drawn against each other in accordance to their geographical location. The draw was split up into three sections: teams from the north, the center and the south. The draw for the second round was made on the 18 September, with the ties being played between the 6–7 October. Ties which ended in a draw were replayed on the 17 October. Caçadores das Taipas' tie against Marco was played at a later date due to a scheduling conflict. Due to the odd number of teams at this stage of the competition, Imortal progressed to the next round due to having no opponent to face at this stage of the competition. The second round saw teams from the Portuguese Second Division (III) enter the competition.

=== North Zone ===
Home team	Score	Away team
Amares (IV)	4–1	Bragança (III)
Canelas (III)	4–1	Ribeirão (IV)
Dragões Sandinenses (IV)	4–1	Monção (IV)
Famalicão (III)	2–4 (aet)	Infesta (III)
Freamunde (III)	1–2	Vilanovense (III)
Joane (III)	2–1	Pedrouços (IV)
Os Sandinenses (III)	2–0	Avintes (IV)
Paredes (III)	1–2	Macedo de Cavaleiros (IV)
Pedras Rubras (III)	1–1 (aet)	Amarante (IV)

Home team	Score	Away team
Pevidém (IV)	0–1	Leixões (III)
Régua (V)	2–3	São Pedro da Cova (V)
Rio Tinto (IV)	0–1	Lousada (IV)
Torre de Moncorvo (IV)	2–1	Ermesinde (III)
Valenciano (IV)	1–0	Gondomar (III)
Vianense (IV)	1–0	Vizela (III)
Vila Real (III)	2–0	Esposende (III)
Vilaverdense (IV)	2–3	Tirsense (IV)
Caçadores das Taipas (III)	2–1 (aet)	Marco (III)

==== Replays ====
Home team	Score	Away team
Amarante (IV)	0–0 (aet, p. 3–4)	Pedras Rubras (III)

=== Central Zone ===
Home team	Score	Away team
Fornos de Algodres (IV)	0–1	Marinhense (III)
Milieu Guarda (IV)	3–1 (aet)	Alqueidão da Serra (IV)
Alcains (III)	3–1	Caranguejeira (IV)
Arrifanense (III)	1–2	Académico de Viseu (III)
Beneditense (III)	2–0 (aet)	Lamego (IV)
Bidoeirense (IV)	3–4	Estarreja (IV)
Cesarense (IV)	1–3	Caldas (III)
Estação (V)	2–1	Sertanense (IV)
Estrela Portalegre (IV)	4–0	Esmoriz (IV)
Feirense (III)	0–1 (aet)	Odivelas (III)
Ginásio Figueirense (V)	1–3	Torres Novas (IV)

Home team	Score	Away team
Lusitânia Lourosa (IV)	1–0	Oliveira do Bairro (III)
Lourinhanense (IV)	3–2	Alcobaça (IV)
Mangualde (IV)	2–1	Penalva do Castelo (IV)
Milheiroense (IV)	1–2	Portomosense (IV)
Mirense (IV)	0–3	Sanjoanense (III)
Sourense (V)	1–0	São João de Ver (V)
Sporting de Pombal (III)	2–0	Benfica Castelo Branco (III)
Torreense (III)	2–1	Sporting da Covilhã (III)
União de Coimbra (III)	2–2 (aet)	Anadia (IV)
Vilafranquense (III)	1–1 (aet)	Fátima (III)
Vitória de Sernache (IV)	1–1 (aet)	Oliveira do Hospital (III)

==== Replays ====
Home team	Score	Away team
Anadia (IV)	2–0	União de Coimbra (III)
Fátima (III)	1–1 (aet, p. 5–4)	Vilafranquense (III)

Home team	Score	Away team
Oliveira do Hospital (III)	5–0	Vitória de Sernache (IV)

=== South Zone ===
Home team	Score	Away team
Vasco da Gama Sines (IV)	3–0	Ourique (IV)
1º Maio Funchal (IV)	2–5	Estoril (III)
Amora (III)	0–2	Operário (III)
Atlético CP (III)	2–0	Lusitano VRSA (IV)
Camacha (III)	2–1 (aet)	Olhanense (III)
Carregado (IV)	2–1	Barreirense (III)
Câmara de Lobos (III)	2–1	Lusitânia (III)
Louletano (III)	1–0 (aet)	Pinhalnovense (IV)
Mafra (IV)	1–2	Casa Pia (III)
Olivais e Moscavide (III)	2–1	Loures (IV)
Oriental (IV)	6–1	Guadalupe (V)

Home team	Score	Away team
Padernense (III)	2–3	Sacavenense (IV)
Pontassolense (IV)	0–1	Machico (III)
Praiense (IV)	0–2	Esperança de Lagos (IV)
Santacruzense (V)	1–2	Portosantense (IV)
Santiago (IV)	1–4	Silves (IV)
São Vicente (IV)	3–0	Águia (IV)
Seixal (III)	3–1	Madalena (IV)
Sintrense (IV)	5–4 (aet)	Desportivo de Beja (IV)
União da Madeira (III)	4–0	Camarate (IV)
União de Montemor (IV)	1–0	Arrentela (V)
União Micaelense (IV)	7–0	Fayal (IV)

== Third round ==
The draw for the third round was made on the 16 October, with the ties being played between the 31 October and the 11 November. Ties which ended in a draw were replayed on the 7–11 November. The third round saw teams from the Liga de Honra (II) enter the competition.

== Fourth round ==
Ties were played on the 16–18 November. Ties which ended in a draw were replayed between the 28 November and the 5 December. Due to the odd number of teams at this stage of the competition, Vitória de Guimarães progressed to the next round due to having no opponent to face at this stage of the competition. The fourth round saw teams from the Primeira Liga (I) enter the competition.

== Fifth round ==
Ties were played on the 5–12 December. Ties which ended in a draw were replayed on the 18–19 December.

5 December 2001	Académico de Viseu (III)	1–0	Penafiel (II)	Estádio do Fontelo, Viseu
	Lemos 56'			Referee: João Vilas Boas

11 December 2001	Belenenses (I)	5–0	Sacavenense (III)	Estádio do Restelo, Lisbon
	Peixoto 16'; Verona 58'; Gerson 64', 82'; Tuck 85'			Referee: Carlos Xistra

11 December 2001	Sanjoanense (III)	0–1	Académica de Coimbra (II)	Estádio Conde Dias Garcia, São João da Madeira
			Adriano 74'	Referee: Paulo Costa

12 December 2001	Benfica (I)	1–1 (a.e.t.)	Marítimo (I)	Estádio da Luz, Lisbon
	Zahovič 110'		Ferraz 92'	Referee: Lucílio Batista

12 December 2001	Boavista (I)	0–1	Alverca (I)	Estádio do Bessa, Porto
			Tinaia 90'	Referee: Paulo Baptista

12 December 2001	Estarreja (IV)	0–0 (a.e.t.)	Caçadores das Taipas (III)	Estádio Doutor Tavares da Silva, Estarreja
				Referee: Jorge Sousa

12 December 2001	Louletano (III)	3–1	Sintrense (IV)	Estádio Municipal de Loulé, Faro
	Anderson 32', 82'; Telmo Pinto 67'		Vicente 42'	Referee: Bruno Paixão

12 December 2001	Moreirense (II)	1–2 (a.e.t.)	Leixões (III)	Parque de Jogos Comendador Joaquim de Almeida Freitas, Moreira de Cónegos
	Roberto 18'		Antchouet 7'; Barros 104'	Referee: João Ferreira

12 December 2001	Naval (II)	2–3	Salgueiros (I)	Estádio Municipal José Bento Pessoa, Figueira da Foz
	Lavos 42'; José Carlos 90'		João Pedro 82', 88'; Litera 93'	Referee: Duarte Gomes

12 December 2001	Porto (I)	2–1 (a.e.t.)	Santa Clara (I)	Estádio das Antas, Porto
	Paredes 81'; Postiga 105'		Vítor Vieira 84'	Referee: Augusto Duarte

12 December 2001	Sporting CP (I)	4–1	Farense (I)	Estádio José Alvalade, Lisbon
	Quaresma 53'; Jardel 75' (pen.), 87'; Cruz 80'		Mestre 49'	Referee: Paulo Paraty

12 December 2001	Sporting de Pombal (III)	1–2	Portimonense (II)	Estádio Municipal de Pombal, Pombal
	Soares 45'		Vicente 20'; Clara 28'	Referee: Luís Miranda

12 December 2001	Vila Real (III)	2–1	Beira-Mar (I)	Complexo Desportivo Monte da Forca, Vila Real
	Freddy 44'; T. Martins 89'		Demétrius 1'	Referee: Martins dos Santos

12 December 2001	Vitória de Guimarães (I)	2–2 (a.e.t.)	Braga (I)	Estádio D. Afonso Henriques, Guimarães
	Flamarion 30' (pen.); Ceará 118'		Barata 20'; C. Lima 111'	Referee: Vítor Pereira

12 December 2001	Vitória de Setúbal (I)	1–2	Paços de Ferreira (I)	Estádio do Bonfim, Setúbal
	M. Ferreira 1'		Jurandir 39'; Carneiro 42'	Referee: Pedro Proença

18 December 2001 Replay	Braga (I)	2–1	Vitória de Guimarães (I)	Estádio Primeiro de Maio, Braga
	Barata 23', 60'		Flamarion 89'	Referee: Pedro Proença

19 December 2001 Replay	Caçadores das Taipas (III)	3–2	Estarreja (IV)	Estádio do Montinho, Caldas das Taipas
				Referee: Joaquim Cunha

19 December 2001 Replay	Marítimo (I)	1–0	Benfica (I)	Estádio dos Barreiros, Funchal
	Van der Gaag 17'			Referee: Paulo Paraty

== Sixth round ==
Ties were played between the 28–29 December to the 9 January. Due to the odd number of teams involved at this stage of the competition, Leixões qualified for the quarter-finals due to having no opponent to face at this stage of the competition.

28 December 2001	Alverca (I)	0–0 (a.e.t.)	Sporting CP (I)	Complexo Desportivo FC Alverca, Alverca do Ribatejo
				Referee: António Costa

29 December 2001	Académica de Coimbra (II)	1–2	Salgueiros (I)	Estádio Cidade de Coimbra, Coimbra
	Dyduch 50' (pen.)		João Pedro 20'; Masi 36'	Referee: Jacinto Paixão

29 December 2001	Académico de Viseu (III)	0–4	Porto (I)	Estádio do Fontelo, Viseu
			McCarthy 6'; Postiga 43', 71'; Clayton 76'	Referee: Mário Mendes

29 December 2001	Braga (I)	4–2	Paços de Ferreira (I)	Estádio Primeiro de Maio, Braga
	Beto 34' (o.g.); Idalécio 69'; Artur Jorge 77'; Barata 87'		Mauro 41'; Leonardo 90' (pen.)	Referee: Bruno Paixão

29 December 2001	Caçadores das Taipas (III)	0–2	Portimonense (II)	Estádio do Montinho, Caldas das Taipas
			Clara 7'; Artur Vicente 51'	Referee: José Leirós

29 December 2001	Marítimo (I)	1–0	Belenenses (I)	Estádio dos Barreiros, Funchal
	Gaúcho 78'			Referee: Olegário Benquerença

29 December 2001	Vitória de Setúbal (III)	2–1	Louletano (III)	Complexo Desportivo Monte Da Forca, Vila Real
	Carlos Pinto 10', 86'		Telmo Pinto 3'	Referee: Manuel Sousa

9 January 2002 Replay	Sporting CP (I)	2–1	Alverca (I)	Estádio José Alvalade, Lisbon
	João Pinto 76'; Jardel 86' (pen.)		Zeferino 11'

== Quarter-finals ==
All quarter-final ties were played on the 16–30 January.

16 January 2002	Leixões (III)	3–1	Portimonense (II)	Estádio do Mar, Matosinhos
	Antchouet 35', 80'; Detinho 68'		Toni 72'	Referee: José Pratas

16 January 2002	Salgueiros (I)	2–2 (a.e.t.)	Marítimo (I)	Estádio Engenheiro Vidal Pinheiro, Porto
	Masi 19'; Toy 38'		Gaúcho 1', 60'	Referee: Duarte Gomes

16 January 2002	Vila Real (III)	0–4	Sporting CP (I)	Complexo Desportivo Monte Da Forca, Vila Real
			Luís Filipe 22', 55'; André Cruz 35'; Quaresma 74'	Referee: António Costa

16 January 2002	Porto (I)	1–2	Braga (I)	Estádio das Antas, Porto
21:00	Capucho 51'		Castanheira 71'; Idalécio 74'	Referee: Vítor Pereira

30 January 2002 Replay	Marítimo (I)	0–0 (a.e.t.) (8–7 p)	Salgueiros (I)	Estádio dos Barreiros, Funchal
	Penalties
	Penalty scored		(penalty scored) (penalty scored) (penalty scored) (penalty scored) (penalty scored) (penalty scored) (penalty scored); Freitas (penalty missed)

== Semi-finals ==
Ties were played on the 6–21 February.

6 February 2002	Sporting CP (I)	3–2 (a.e.t.)	Marítimo (I)	Estádio José Alvalade, Lisbon
21:00	Nalitzis 65'; André Cruz 85'; João Pinto 92'		Sabry 30'; Gaúcho 81'	Referee: Paulo Costa

21 February 2002	Braga (I)	1–3	Leixões (III)	Estádio Primeiro de Maio, Braga
	Barroso 83'		Abílio 49'; Nené 80'; Detinho 90'	Attendance: 7,000; Referee: José Pratas

== Final ==
12 May 2002
17:00 WEST

Leixões	0–1	Sporting CP
		Jardel 40'

Estádio Nacional, Oeiras
Attendance: 37,500
Referee: Olegário Benquerença (Leiria)
