= Allan K. Jepsen =

Danish footballer (born 1977)

Allan Jepsen
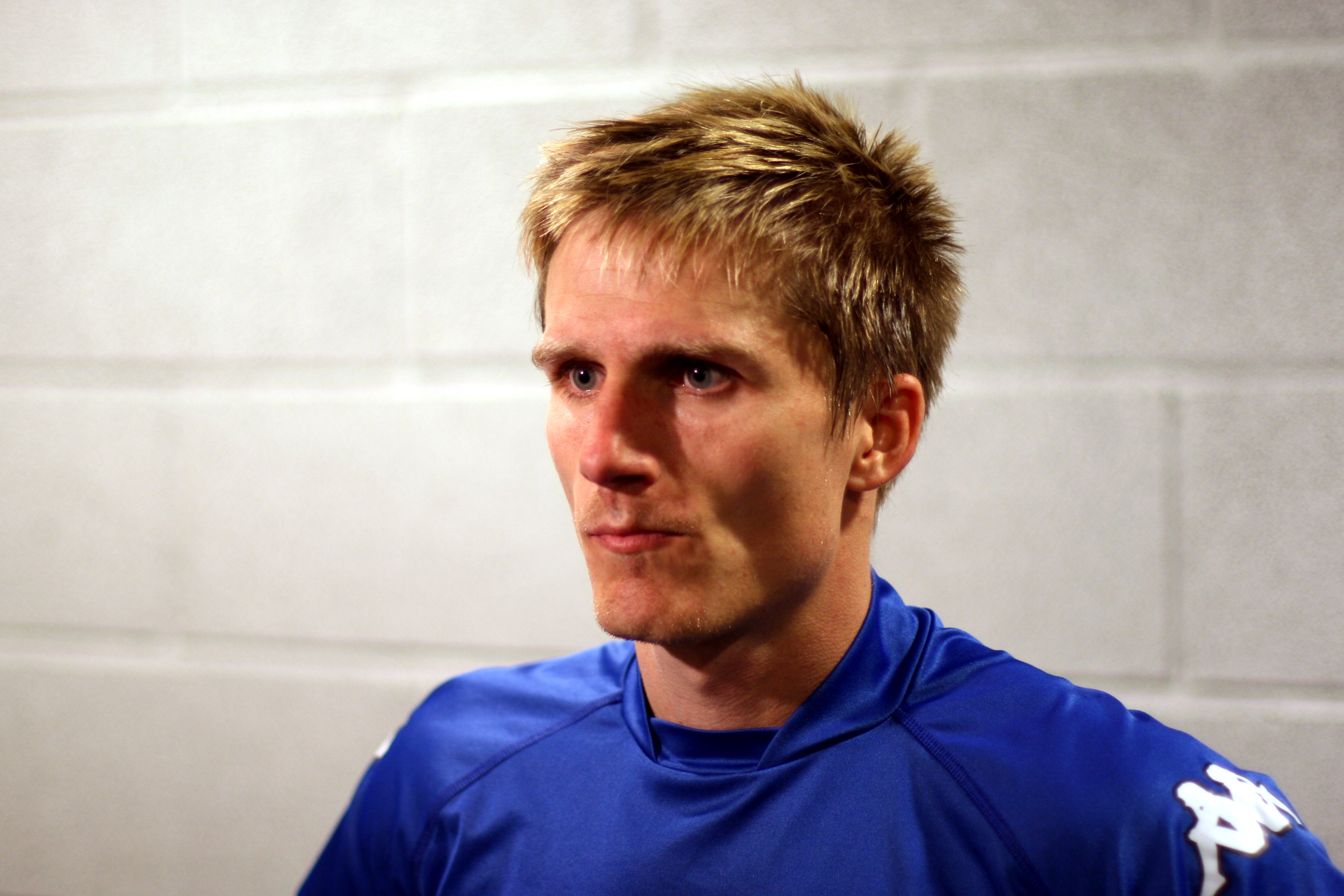

Personal information
- Full name: Allan Kierstein Jepsen
- Date of birth: 4 July 1977 (age 49)
- Place of birth: Kolding, Denmark
- Height: 1.75 m (5 ft 9 in)
- Position: Left back

Team information
- Current team: Midtjylland (U17 manager)

Senior career*
Years	Team	Apps	(Gls)
1996–1997	AGF	23	(1)
1997–1999	Hamburger SV	26	(1)
1999–2000	Heerenveen	10	(0)
2000–2005	AaB	173	(3)
2006–2009	Vålerenga	72	(3)
2009–2010	Randers	12	(0)
2010	Alemannia Aachen	15	(0)
2010–2011	Horsens	10	(0)

International career
2005–2006	Denmark	2	(0)

Managerial career
- 2013–2014: AGF U14
- 2014–2016: AGF U17
- 2016–2017: AGF (Assistant)
- 2017–2019: AGF (staff)
- 2019–2020: AaB (assistant)
- 2020–2021: NSÍ
- 2022–: Midtjylland (U17)
- * Club domestic league appearances and goals

Allan Kierstein Jepsen (born 4 July 1977) is a Danish former professional football player and current U17 manager at FC Midtjylland.

He played as a left back for a number of clubs, spending most of his career with Aalborg Boldspilklub. Jepsen played two games for the Denmark national football team.

== Career ==
Starting his professional career at AGF, Jepsen was a promising talent for many years, and was capped 24 times for the Danish national U21 team, while playing abroad for prominent teams Heerenveen and Hamburg. The young defender, however, never broke into the starting eleven on the highest level, and before the 2000–01 season he returned to the Danish Superliga outfit AaB, poised to replace club legend Jens Jessen. After almost 200 matches for AaB, Jepsen finally achieved a full cap for the Danish national team on 2 June 2005, coming on for Niclas Jensen at the 71st minute in the 1–0 win over Finland.

On 13 March 2006, Jepsen used a clause in his contract as he signed for the Norwegian club Vålerenga for a €335,000 transfer fee. He revealed that the chance of playing in the UEFA Champions League was one of the chief reasons in choosing his new club. In June 2009, Vålerenga and the Danish club Randers made a transfer agreement for Jepsen. The Dane signed a six-month contract with the Danish side. Jepsen played his last match for Vålerenga on 14 June 2009.

Jepsen played 12 games for Randers, but left the club when his contract ran out in January 2010. He returned to Germany, signing for Alemannia Aachen in the German 2. Bundesliga.
