= 1994–95 Belgian First Division =

92nd season of top-tier football in Belgium

Belgian First Division
- Season: 1994–95

Following are the results for the 1994–95 Belgian First Division professional association football season. R.S.C. Anderlecht won the title of the 1994–95 season.

This was the final season in which two points were awarded for a win; going forward this changed to three points.

== Relegated teams ==
Location of teams in Belgian First Division 1994–95

These teams were relegated to the second division at the end of the season:

- K.V. Oostende
- R.F.C. Liégeois

== Final league table ==
Pos	Team	Pld	W	D	L	GF	GA	GD	Pts	Qualification or relegation
1	R.S.C. Anderlecht	34	23	6	5	80	31	+49	52	Qualified for 1995–96 UEFA Champions League
2	Standard Liège	34	21	9	4	52	23	+29	51	Qualified for 1995–96 UEFA Cup
3	Club Brugge	34	21	7	6	68	31	+37	49	Qualified for 1995–96 UEFA Cup Winners' Cup
4	K.S.C. Eendracht Aalst	34	14	11	9	63	57	+6	39	Qualified for 1995–96 UEFA Cup
5	Lierse S.K.	34	14	9	11	52	52	0	37	Qualified for 1995–96 UEFA Cup
6	K.F.C. Germinal Beerschot	34	12	13	9	57	39	+18	37	Qualified for 1995 UEFA Intertoto Cup
7	K.F.C. Lommel S.K.	34	13	9	12	44	41	+3	35	
8	K. Sint-Truidense V.V.	34	11	13	10	34	35	−1	35	
9	R.F.C. Seraing	34	12	10	12	53	45	+8	34	
10	K.S.K. Beveren	34	10	12	12	40	46	−6	32	Qualified for 1995 UEFA Intertoto Cup
11	Y.R. K.V. Mechelen	34	11	9	14	41	46	−5	31	
12	R.W.D. Molenbeek	34	10	11	13	34	41	−7	31	
13	R. Charleroi S.C.	34	10	11	13	33	43	−10	31	Qualified for 1995 UEFA Intertoto Cup
14	K.A.A. Gent	34	11	8	15	41	53	−12	30	
15	Cercle Brugge K.S.V.	34	9	10	15	43	52	−9	28	
16	R. Antwerp F.C.	34	8	8	18	40	56	−16	24	
17	K.V. Oostende	34	5	9	20	34	81	−47	19	Relegated to Belgian Second Division
18	R.F.C. de Liège	34	5	7	22	35	72	−37	17	Relegated to Belgian Second Division

== Results ==
Home \ Away	AAL	AND	ANT	BEV	CER	CLU	CHA	EKE	GNT	RCL	LIE	LOM	MEC	MOL	OST	SER	STV	STA
Eendracht Aalst		3–6	3–0	1–3	6–4	1–0	0–0	0–3	3–1	2–0	2–2	1–1	1–1	2–0	7–1	1–3	2–2	1–3
Anderlecht	3–2		3–1	2–1	1–1	1–0	4–0	2–2	4–0	2–0	4–2	3–2	0–1	2–0	3–0	4–0	0–1	2–1
Antwerp	2–3	2–4		0–0	2–1	0–1	0–2	4–2	3–3	3–0	0–3	1–1	2–0	2–0	2–1	2–2	0–3	0–1
Beveren	3–0	0–0	0–4		1–0	0–2	2–1	1–1	4–0	5–4	2–2	2–0	3–0	1–1	0–0	1–0	0–0	2–2
Cercle Brugge	1–1	2–1	0–0	2–0		0–4	0–1	1–2	1–1	3–0	5–0	3–1	2–2	0–0	3–1	2–1	0–1	3–0
Club Brugge	2–3	1–0	3–2	4–1	4–0		3–2	0–0	3–2	2–0	1–0	5–0	2–0	3–1	2–3	3–3	4–1	2–0
Charleroi	0–0	2–1	0–0	0–0	2–0	1–1		1–2	0–0	4–1	1–0	2–0	0–1	2–0	1–0	2–3	0–4	0–3
Germinal Ekeren	2–3	2–3	2–0	3–0	1–1	1–1	5–0		4–1	3–1	2–4	2–2	0–2	0–1	4–1	3–1	1–2	1–1
Gent	1–2	0–2	2–1	2–1	4–0	1–2	2–2	1–0		1–0	2–2	0–2	2–0	0–0	5–0	1–0	0–0	0–1
Liége	2–3	0–4	3–1	1–0	0–0	1–1	2–2	0–0	4–1		2–0	1–2	1–2	2–2	1–2	0–1	1–1	1–1
Lierse	3–1	1–8	3–0	3–1	2–1	1–2	1–0	0–0	2–1	5–0		0–0	0–0	2–0	3–1	0–0	1–0	0–0
Lommel	1–0	1–2	1–0	1–1	0–0	1–0	2–0	1–1	3–1	4–2	2–3		2–0	3–0	3–1	3–1	0–1	3–0
Mechelen	2–2	1–1	1–1	1–1	3–1	1–2	1–3	0–2	0–0	6–1	4–0	1–0		1–0	4–1	2–1	0–1	0–2
Molenbeek	1–2	0–2	3–1	2–0	1–1	1–1	1–0	0–0	0–1	4–0	2–1	0–0	3–1		1–1	1–0	1–0	1–2
Oostende	2–2	0–2	0–3	2–1	0–2	1–6	1–1	1–1	2–4	1–3	0–3	2–1	1–1	2–2		1–2	2–1	0–2
Seraing	2–3	1–1	2–0	1–2	4–1	0–0	1–1	1–1	3–0	2–1	4–1	3–0	3–1	1–2	2–2		3–0	1–1
Sint-Truiden	0–0	0–2	0–0	0–0	3–2	0–1	0–0	0–4	0–1	1–0	2–2	1–1	2–0	4–2	1–1	1–1		1–1
Standard Liège	0–0	1–1	3–1	4–1	2–0	2–0	2–0	2–0	2–0	1–0	2–0	1–0	3–1	1–1	2–0	1–0	2–0	

Legend: Blue = home team win; Yellow = draw; Red = away team win.

== Top goal scorers ==
Scorer	Goals	Team
(Australia) Aurelio Vidmar	22	Standard Liège
(Belgium) Gilles De Bilde	21	Eendracht Aalst
(Belgium) Gunther Hofmans	16	Germinal Ekeren
(Croatia) (Belgium) Josip Weber	15	Anderlecht
(Zaire) Roger Lukaku	15	Seraing
(Belgium) Lorenzo Staelens	15	Club Brugge
(Belgium) Gert Verheyen	15	Club Brugge
(Belgium) Patrick Goots	14	Beveren
(Belgium) Christophe Lauwers	14	Cercle Brugge

== Attendances ==
#	Club	Average
1	Anderlecht	19,265
2	Standard	16,265
3	Club Brugge	9,441
4	STVV	8,671
5	Charleroi	8,076
6	Gent	7,612
7	Mechelen	7,600
8	Lommel	7,559
9	Aalst	7,559
10	Lierse	6,500
11	Oostende	5,524
12	Seraing	5,176
13	Antwerp	5,124
14	RWDM	5,029
15	Beveren	5,018
16	Ekeren	4,476
17	Liège	4,412
18	Cercle	3,688
