= Engin Özdemir =

Turkish footballer

Personal information
- Date of birth: 1 October 1968 (age 58)
- Place of birth: Sivas, Turkey
- Height: 1.72 m (5 ft 8 in)
- Position: Midfielder

Team information
- Current team: Türkischer SV Singen

Youth career
- 1978–1987: SV 07 Raunheim

Senior career*
Years	Team	Apps	(Gls)
1987–1988	Mainz 05	6	(0)
1988–1992	Türkgücü München	67	(12)
1992–1996	Gençlerbirliği	109	(25)
1996–2001	İstanbulspor	73	(6)
1998–2000	→ Adanaspor (loan)	20	(3)
2001	→ Diyarbakırspor (loan)	14	(6)
2001	Gençlerbirliği	2	(0)
2002–2003	Antalyaspor	18	(2)

International career
1984–1985	Turkey U16	4	(0)
1996	Turkey	2	(0)

Managerial career
- 2015–2016: Yeni Malatyaspor (youth)
- 2016–2017: Yeni Malatyaspor (assistant)
- 2018–2019: Eskişehirspor (assistant)
- 2021: Çatalcaspor
- 2021–2022: Eskisehir Yunusemre Spor
- 2022–2023: Karaman FK (assistant)
- 2023-2024: Gençlerbirliği (assistant)
- 2024–2025: Kayserispor (assistant)
- 2025-: Türkischer SV Singen
- * Club domestic league appearances and goals

Engin Özdemir (born 1 October 1968) is a Turkish former professional footballer who played as a right midfielder and winger. He is best known for playing for Gençlerbirliği. He is also the father of YouTuber CaniSports.

== Club career ==
Özdemir started playing for SV 07 Raunheim at the age of 10, before joining Mainz 05, who at the time were playing in the Oberliga Südwest, nine years later. During his two-year stay, he played 23 matches in all competitions, scoring 11 and getting 1 assist and helped Mainz gain promotion to the 2. Bundesliga for the 1988–89 season.

He then joined Türkgücü München, who were playing in the Landesliga Bayern-Süd. Before leaving in November 1992, Özdemir playing 12 games, scoring 11 times in the 1992–93 season.

Özdemir made four appearances at the 1995 UEFA Intertoto Cup, scoring four goals. However, Gençlerbirliği finished third in their group and so failed to progress. With İstanbulspor, he played six times and scored one goal at the 1997 Intertoto Cup.

== International career ==
Özdemir made his international debut for Turkey on 9 April 1996 in a friendly against Azerbaijan, in which Turkey won 1–0. He played again in a subsequent friendly on 1 May against Ukraine, where Turkey won 3–2.

== Coaching career ==
Özdemir was player-coach of SV Dersim Ruesselsheim from July 2009 until December 2009. From 2010 until December 2012, he was a player-coach for FV Biebrich.

From 2013 until 2014, he was the youth team coach for TSG 1846 Mainz-Kastel. Özdemir was the head coach of the Yeni Malatyaspor youth team from October 2015 until August 2016, where he was made assistant manager of the senior team until May 2017. He was the assistant coach of Eskişehirspor from August 2018 until May 2019. In January 2021, he became the manager of Çatalcaspor, who are in the TFF 3. Lig.

== Career statistics ==
=== Club ===
Appearances and goals by club, season and competition
Club	Season	League			Cup (Note: The Südwestpokal and the Turkish Cup)		Continental (Note: The UEFA Intertoto Cup)		Total	
Club	Season	Division	Apps	Goals	Apps	Goals	Apps	Goals	Apps	Goals
Mainz 05	1987–88	Oberliga	6	0	2	0	–	–	8	0
Mainz 05	1998–89	2. Bundesliga	0	0	–	–	–	–	0	0
Türkgücü München	1998–89	Landesliga			–	–	–	–		
Türkgücü München	1989–90	Landesliga			–	–	–	–		
Türkgücü München	1990–91	Landesliga			–	–	–	–		
Türkgücü München	1991–92	Landesliga			–	–	–	–		
Türkgücü München	1992–93	Landesliga	12	11	–	–	–	–	12	11
Gençlerbirliği	1992–93	1. Lig (Note: Named respectively as Milli Lig between 1959–1962, Türkiye 1. Futbol Ligi (1. Lig) between 1962–2000, and Süper Lig from 2001 to present)	16	1	–	–	–	–	16	1
Gençlerbirliği	1993–94	1. Lig	29	4	–	–	–	–	29	4
Gençlerbirliği	1994–95	1. Lig	33	10	1	0	–	–	34	10
Gençlerbirliği	1995–96	1. Lig	31	10	3	1	4	5	38	16
İstanbulspor	1996–97	1. Lig	28	2	1	1	–	–	29	3
İstanbulspor	1997–98	1. Lig	27	2	3	0	6	1	36	3
İstanbulspor	1998–99	1. Lig	6	0	–	–	–	–	6	0
İstanbulspor	1999–2000	1. Lig	5	1	–	–	–	–	5	1
İstanbulspor	2000–01	1. Lig	7	1	1	1	–	–	8	2
Adanaspor (loan)	1998–99	1. Lig	2	0	0	0	–	–	2	0
Adanaspor (loan)	1999–2000	1. Lig	18	3	1	0	–	–	19	3
Diyarbakırspor	2000–01	2. Lig	14	6	–	–	–	–	14	6
Gençlerbirliği	2001–02	Süper Lig	2	0	–	–	–	–	2	0
Antalyaspor	2001–02	Süper Lig	8	1	–	–	–	–	8	1
Antalyaspor	2001-01	1. Lig	10	1	–	–	–	–	10	1
Career total			236	42	10	3	10	6	268	62

=== International ===
Appearances and goals by national team and year
National team	Year	Apps	Goals
Turkey	1996	2	0
Total		2	0
