= Ara de Trajano =

Coordinates: 41°29′13″N 8°20′38″W

The Ara de Trajano is a Roman inscription made on a granite boulder located in Caldas das Taipas, Braga District, Portugal with an honorific inscription to Trajan, dated 103. It was classified as a Monumento Nacional(National Monument) by the Decreto of 16–06–1910, Diário do Governo, No. 136, of 23–06–1910.

It is also known as Lápide das Taipas, Ara de Nerva or Penedo da Moura.

The inscription is on one of the faces of a granite block cut into three faces, each of them approximately three meters high. The inscription reads:

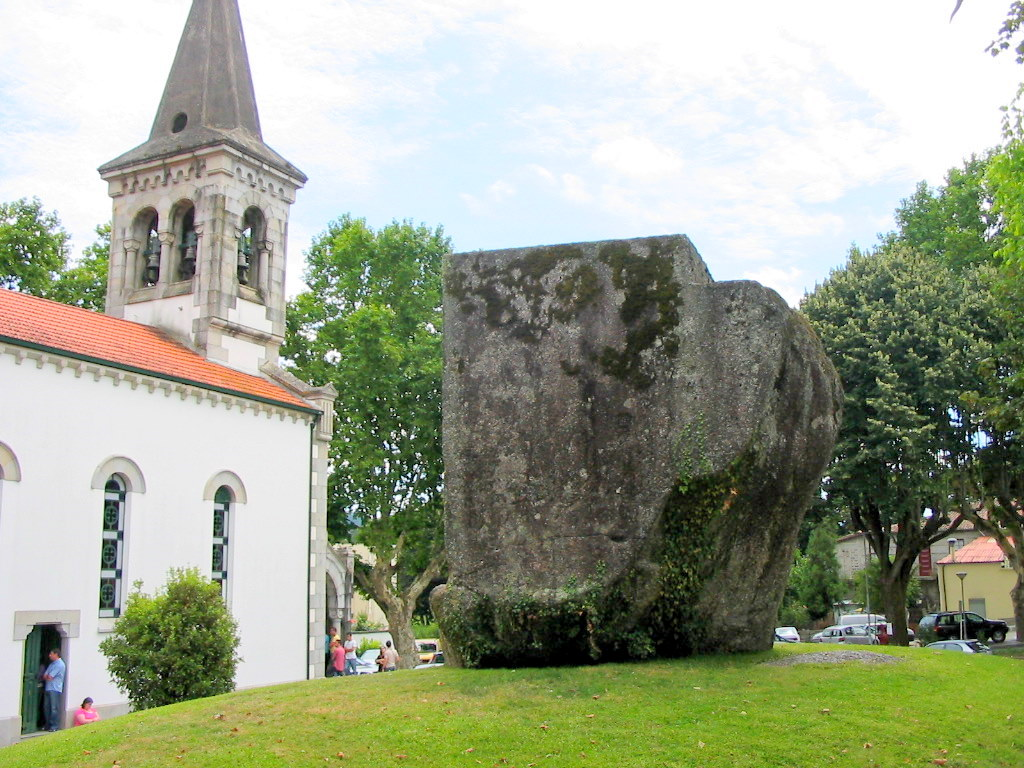

IMP(ERATOR) CAES(AR) NERVA/ TRAIANVS AVG(VSTVS), GER(MANICVS), DAC(ICVS)/ POT(IFEX) MAX(IMVS), TRIB(VNITIA) POT(ESTATE) VII/ IMP(ERATOR) IIII CO(N)S(UL) V, P(ATER) P(ATRIAE)] ("Emperor Caesar Nerva Trajan, Augustus, Germanicus, Dacicus, Pontiff Maximus, with the tribune power for the seventh time, Emperor for the fourth time, Consul for the fifth time, Father of the Fatherland").

== Trivia ==
- This monument was honored by the opening of a Unidade de Saúde Familiar (Family Medical Clinic) in Caldas das Taipas, USF Ara de Trajano.
