= Çatalcaspor =

Turkish football club

- Full name: Çatalca Spor Kulübü
- Founded: 1942
- Ground: Ziya Altınoğlu Stadı, Çatalca, Istanbul
- Chairman: Hasan Gökçe
- Manager: Engin Özdemir
- League: TFF Third League
- 2022–23: TFF Third League, Group 1, 8th
Home colours	Away colours

Çatalcaspor is a Turkish football club from Istanbul that plays in the TFF Third League.

== League Participations ==
- TFF Third League: 2014–present
- Turkish Regional Amateur League: 2011–2014
- Amatör Futbol Ligleri: ??

== Stadium ==
Currently the team plays at the 1150 capacity Ziya Altınoğlu Stadı.
