= Nocko Joković =

Danish footballer (born 1973)

Personal information
- Full name: Novica Joković
- Date of birth: 3 July 1973 (age 53)
- Place of birth: Silkeborg, Denmark
- Height: 1.78 m (5 ft 10 in)
- Position: Striker

Youth career
- –1986: Silkeborg
- 1986–1992: AGF

Senior career*
Years	Team	Apps	(Gls)
1992–1996	AGF	56	(15)
1996–1999	Silkeborg	100	(22)
2000–2001	AGF	57	(18)
2002	Livingston	3	(0)
2002	Havnar Bóltfelag	6	(4)
2003–2005	Randers	2	(0)

International career
1995	Denmark U21	2	(0)
- * Club domestic league appearances and goals

Novica "Nocko" Joković (Serbian Cyrillic: Новица "Ноцко" Јоковић; born 3 July 1973) is a Danish former professional footballer who played as a striker.

== Club career ==
Joković started playing football for hometown club Silkeborg IF, before moving to AGF's youth academy at age 15. He made his professional debut for the club on 12 August 1992, starting in a 1–0 win over Lyngby. He played for the club until 1996, where he returned to Silkeborg. After a successful spell, he returned to AGF again in 2000. He was released from the club in January 2002 after disciplinary issues during practice.

After being a free agent for two months, Joković moved to Scottish club Livingston where he joined compatriot Morten Petersen. He left as his contract expired at the end of the 2001–02 season, which saw Livingston finish third in the Scottish Premier League while Joković made only three appearances in which he did not score. In August 2002, Joković left for Faroese club Havnar Bóltfelag and was part of the team winning the top tier 1. deild before leaving in October 2002 after the season.

Joković returned to Denmark after almost a year as a free agent, signing a two-year contract with Danish 1st Division club Randers FC on 15 August 2003. He retired from football in January 2005 after a spell plagued by knee injuries, and with only two appearances. His stint with Randers had a legal aftermath, and in January 2009 he sued his former club through Spillerforeningen (The Danish Player Association) in a dispute over unpaid insurance money. Randers was sentenced to pay a fee of DKK 150,000 in damages to Joković in March 2010.

== International career ==
Joković made his Denmark under-21 debut against Finland in May 1995. He came on as a substitute for Ulrik Pedersen in the 1–0 loss, after a late Sami Hyypiä goal.

== Personal life ==
Born in Silkeborg, Denmark, to Serbian parents, Vojin and Gordana Joković, Joković has an older brother, Aleksandar.

Joković is divorced from Louise Søndergaard and together they have a daughter and a son.

=== Legal issues ===
Joković was convicted in February 2000 of aggravated assault after punching a young man during a night out and was subsequently given a suspended jail term of 30 days. In July 2000 he was involved in another case of assault, but was acquitted in the case in January 2001.

== Honours ==
Silkeborg

- UEFA Intertoto Cup: 1996

Havnar Bóltfelag

- 1. deild (Note: 1. deild was originally the top level of Faroe Islands football but was replaced by the Faroe Islands Premier League in 2005): 2002
