= Brendan Markey =

Irish footballer

Personal information
- Date of birth: 19 May 1976 (age 50))
- Place of birth: Dublin, Ireland
- Position: Striker

Youth career
- Cherry Orchard F.C.

Senior career*
| Years | Team | Apps | (Gls) |
| 1994–1996 | Bohemians | 24 | (12) |
| 1996–1998 | Millwall | 0 | (0) |
| 1996–1997 | → Dundalk (loan) | 5 | (2) |
| 1997–1998 | → Bohemians (loan) | 11 | (3) |
| 1998–1999 | → Shamrock Rovers (loan) | 14 | (1) |
| 1999–2000 | Waterford United | 23 | (3) |
| 2000–2001 | Newry Town | 6 | (0) |
| 2000–2001 | Bohemians | 11 | (1) |
| 2001–2003 | Dublin City F.C. | 49 | (15) |
| 2002–2003 | Glenavon | 2 | (1) |
| 2003 | Athlone Town | 12 | (0) |
| 2003 | Dundalk | 9 | (0) |
| 2004 | Monaghan United | 16 | (2) |
| 2004 | St Patrick's Athletic | 10 | (0) |
| Total | | 192 | (40) |
- * Club domestic league appearances and goals

Brendan Markey (born 19 May 1976 is an Irish former soccer player.

== Career ==
A striker, he started his career with Bohemians, where he scored at Helsingin Jalkapalloklubi in a 1995 UEFA Intertoto Cup tie.

In December 1995 he was bought for £60,000 by Mick McCarthy at Millwall. However his time in London was marred by injury and he did not play a single first team game for the Lions. He was loaned out to Dundalk in November 1996.

He signed for Shamrock Rovers for the 1998-99 League of Ireland season. His only goal came at Oriel Park on 25 February.

He then moved to Waterford United where he scored in just one game all season on 27 December 1999, a hat trick against St Pats. There were further spells at Bohemians again, Monaghan United, St Patrick's Athletic, Athlone Town, Newry Town and Glenavon F.C.
