= Telmo Pinto =

Portuguese footballer

Personal information
- Full name: Telmo Manuel Machado Pinto
- Date of birth: 18 January 1971 (age 55)
- Place of birth: Quarteira, Portugal
- Position: Midfielder

Senior career*
Years	Team	Apps	(Gls)
1988–1990	Louletano		
1991–1992	Almancilense		
1992–1993	Salir		
1993–1995	Louletano		
1995	União de Leiria	1	(0)
1995–1996	Paços de Ferreira	31	(5)
1996–1997	Académica de Coimbra	3	(0)
1997	União de Leiria	2	(0)
1998	Espinho	7	(0)
1998–1999	Esposende	29	(4)
1999–2001	Penafiel		
2001–2006	Louletano		
- * Club domestic league appearances and goals

Telmo Manuel Machado Pinto (born 18 January 1971) is a Portuguese former professional footballer who played as a midfielder. He is the president of the junta de freguesia of Quarteira, elected from the Socialist Party.

== Career ==
Pinto made his professional debut in the Primeira Liga for União de Leiria on 19 August 1995 as a second-half substitute in a 4–0 loss against Marítimo.

He scored four goals for União de Leiria in the 1995 UEFA Intertoto Cup campaign.
