= Per Pedersen (footballer) =

Danish footballer

Personal information
- Full name: Per Werner Pedersen
- Date of birth: 30 March 1969 (age 57)
- Place of birth: Aalborg, Denmark
- Height: 1.85 m (6 ft 1 in)
- Position: Striker

Senior career*
Years	Team	Apps	(Gls)
1986–1990	Odense BK	44	(16)
1990–1995	Lyngby BK	96	(38)
1995–1997	Odense BK	49	(27)
1997–1998	Blackburn Rovers	11	(1)
1997–1998	→ Borussia M'gladbach (loan)	14	(1)
1998–1999	Racing Strasbourg	7	(0)
1999–2000	Odense BK	11	(1)

International career
1988	Denmark u-21	2	(1)
1991–1997	Denmark	6	(2)

Managerial career
- 2003–2004: BK Marienlyst
- * Club domestic league appearances and goals

Per Werner Pedersen (born 30 March 1969) is a Danish former footballer who played the majority of his career for Danish clubs Odense BK and Lyngby BK. Pedersen scored two goals in six games for the Danish national team between 1991 and 1997. In 1997, he became the most expensive player sold by a Danish football club, when he signed a £2.5 million transfer deal with English club Blackburn Rovers, where he scored once against Chelsea at Stamford Bridge. Pedersen also had short stints with German club Borussia Mönchengladbach and Racing Strasbourg in France. He moved back to Denmark to play for Odense BK, where he suffered a career-ending injury, and retired in June 2001.

Pedersen also appeared in matches for Denmark's league selection, in which he played in several matches not considered fully official. A high point of his career came in 1997, when he scored four goals in a game for Denmark against the United States at the U.S. Cup.

== Honours ==
- Danish football championship: 1989, 1991–92
- Danish Cup: 1990–91, 1992–93
