= Caldas das Taipas =

- Civil parish
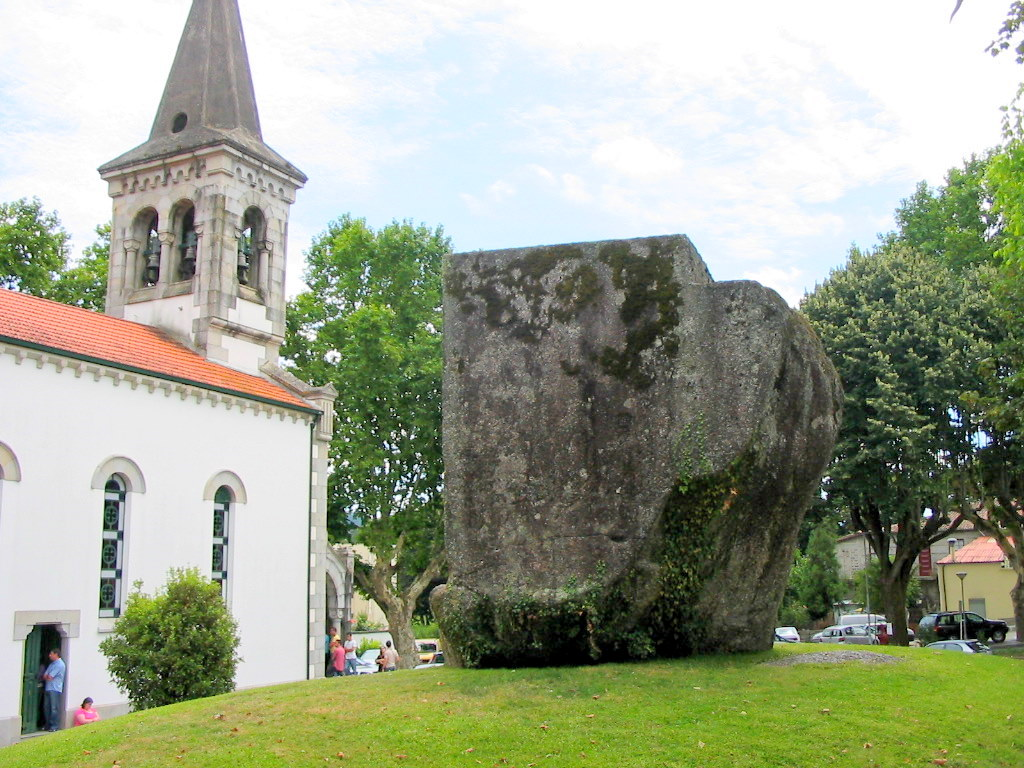
- Ara de Trajano

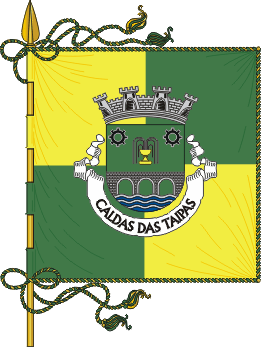
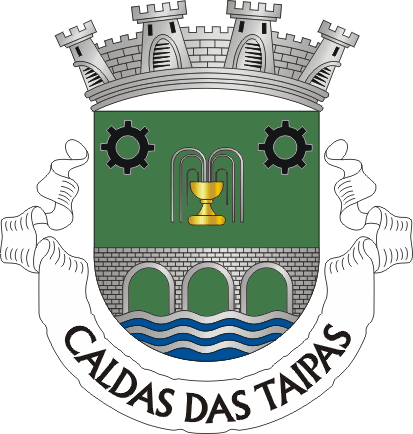
- Flag Coat of arms

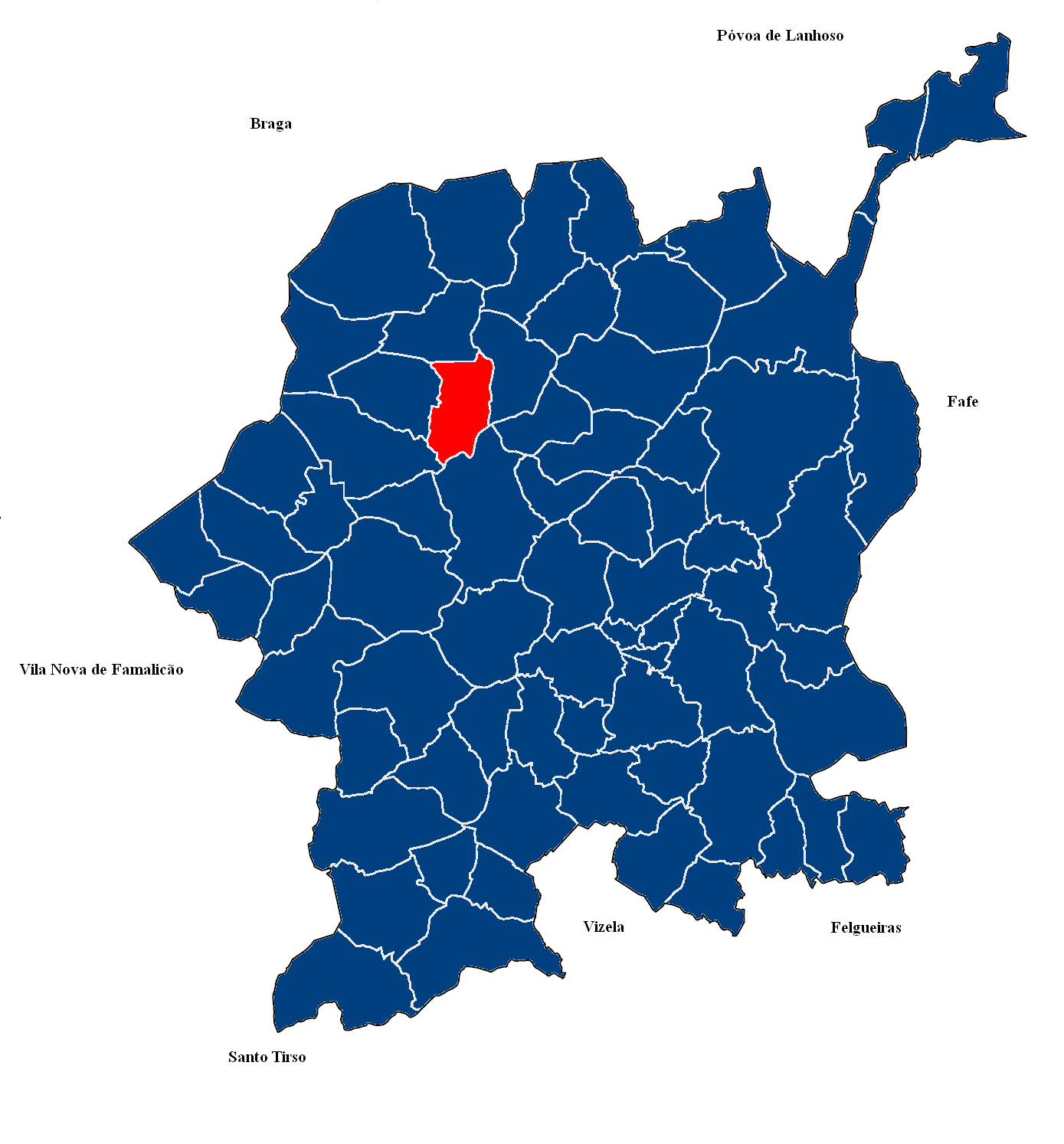
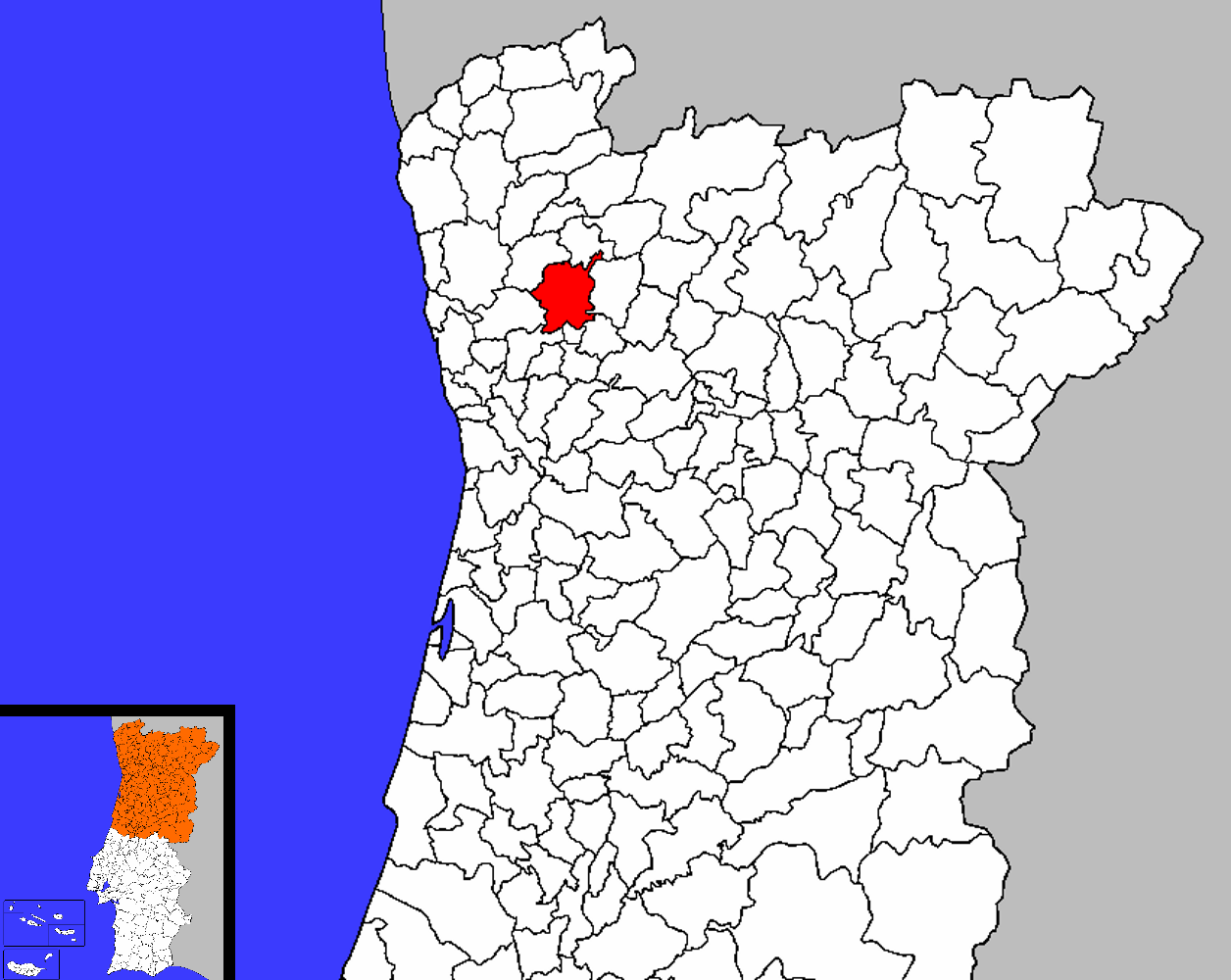
- Coordinates: 41.486°N 8.348°W
- Country: Portugal
- Region: Norte
- Intermunic. comm.: Ave
- District: Braga
- Municipality: Guimarães

Area
  - Total: 2.69 km^{2} (1.04 sq mi)

Population (2021)
  - Total: 6,304
  - Density: 2,340/km^{2} (6,070/sq mi)
- Time zone: UTC+00:00 (WET)
  - Summer (DST): UTC+01:00 (WEST)
- Patron: Saint Thomas
- Website: https://caldasdastaipas.com/

Caldelas (also known as Caldas das Taipas and, in the past, S. Tomé de Caldelas) is a Portuguese civil parish in the municipality of Guimarães. With an area of 2.69 km² and 6304 inhabitants (2021 census). Its population density is 2 343.5 hab./km².

== History ==
The village seat of the parish was raised to the category of town by decree no. 30 518 of June 19, 1940, under the name of Caldas das Taipas.

The seat of the parish of Caldelas is known as Caldas das Taipas, due to the hot springs recognized since the Roman presence in the Iberian Peninsula. It is located on the road that connects the cities of Guimarães and Braga (EN 101). It is about 7 km from the first and 14 km from the second.

From the time of the Romans, who used the thermal waters of Caldelas with medicinal qualities, some testimonies remain, such as the Ara de Trajano, with inscriptions to the emperor. Several vestiges of that time were found in the place where the first bathhouse was installed, which has since been rebuilt to what is known today as Banhos Velhos (Old Baths).

The discovery of new water springs and the need to build new facilities for the Baths, determined the location of what has since become known as New Baths. After a period of interregnum, the Baths resumed operation in the 1980s and have been developing technical improvements in order to expand the services.

The landscape qualities were once described by artists writers who eternalized the natural beauty: Ferreira de Castro and Ramalho Ortigão.

However, the town had a great growth both in terms of resident population and in terms of urban agglomeration. This growth is explained, in a first moment, by the expressive installation of the cutlery industry and, in a second moment, by the fact of the proximity of two important cities - Braga and Guimarães and the improvement of the access facilities to the cities. The growth, not having been controlled, led to situations of rupture and the road connection to Guimarães is made with some difficulty, due to the high traffic that is registered along that road. Indelibly, that growth had negative impacts on the landscape and the descriptions of those authors would be quite different today.

Besides the thermal springs, there is also a camping park, a swimming pool complex and a natural park on the banks of the Ave River, which together show the town's strong vocation for tourism, which is still potential and expectant.

Although its patron saint (orago) is Saint Thomas (São Tomé), the town is more celebrated in pilgrimages related to Saint Peter (São Pedro).

=== Spa ===
The potential of the thermal activity in Caldelas begins with the Romanization. In 1753, Friar Cristóvão, in a book he wrote about the places he visited, praised the thermal springs and their therapeutic virtues.

The ruins of Banhos Velhos represent a thermal complex with a well, pool, tanks, springs, and baths, with a brick and mosaic covering, and were discovered in the 19th century.

In 1818, the municipality expropriates the Tapadinho field to build a baths there. The growing importance of exploiting the thermal waters is evident in the fact that they were exhibited at the Industrial Exhibition of Guimarães, in 1884. In 1906, José Antunes Machado bought from the Guimarães City Council the concession of the industrial and commercial exploitation of the springs, implementing a series of infrastructures: the "buvette" of water catchment and a modern bathhouse. José Machado soon gave the exploitation rights to a consortium: Empresa Termal das Taipas.

In 1917, the Hotel das Termas, designed by Eduardo da Costa Alves, an architect from Oporto, was inaugurated. The President of the Republic Óscar Carmona stayed there, during the Commemorations of the Double Centennial, in 1940. The spa is housed in a building of neoclassical eighteenth-century inspiration, being the only spa in the country with effective treatment for dermatological problems. Nowadays, the thermal complex is much more than just a spa. Known as Taipas Termal, today there are hotel units, as well as a camping park intrinsic to the thermal complex, and also the Taipas Termal pools and the Leisure Park, among other reasons of interest.

=== Avepark ===
Avepark has been under construction since June 2006, between the town of Caldas das Taipas and the parish of Barco, as the Ave pole of the Oporto Science and Technology Park where, in partnership with the University of Minho, it is also planned to install, as part of an application made to the European Union, the first European Center of Excellence in Portugal (the European Institute of Excellence in Tissue Engineering and Regenerative Medicine).

== Heritage ==
- Ara de Trajano (Lápide das Taipas) or Penedo de Trajano, Penedo da Moura or Ara de Nerva
- Ponte do Rio Ave or Ponte das Taipas
- Termas das Taipas (Banhos Velhos)

== Economic Activities ==
- Agriculture
- Metalworking Industry
- Cutlery Industry
- Commerce

== Collectivities and Associations ==
- Banda Musical de Caldas das Taipas (Musical Band)
- Clube Caçadores das Taipas (Football Team)
- Centro de Atividades Recreativas Taipense (CART) (Sports Centre)
- Rotary Club de Caldas das Taipas (Motorcycle Club)
- Centro Social Pe. Manuel Joaquim de Sousa
- Clube de Ténis (Tennis Club)
- Clube de Ténis de Mesa (Table Tennis Club)
- Clube de Caça do Vale do Ave (Hunting Club)
- Clube de Pesca (Fishing Club)
- CNE - Agrupamento 666 de Caldas das Taipas (Scouts)
- Associação Humanitária dos Bombeiros Voluntários de Caldas das Taipas (Volunteer Firefighter Association)
- Movimento Artístico das Taipas - Associação Cultural (Art Association)
- Molinhas - Clube de Rope Skipping das Taipas (Rope Skipping Club)
- Comissão de Festas Dar Vida à Vila (DVAV) (Party & Civic Celebrations Commission)

== Fairs, festivals and pilgrimages ==
- S. Pedro (Festas da Vila)
- S. Tomé e Santo Ovídio
- Weekly Market on Mondays

== Cultural and Touristic Activities ==
- Antique and "Old Stuff" Market
- Cultural activities promoted by Comissão de Festas Dar Vida à Vila (DVAV)
- Cultural activities promoted by Banhos Velhos

== Cuisine ==
- Rojões com papas de sarrabulho

== Other Places ==
- Leisure park with fluvial beach
- Spa
- Camping Park
- Sports center CART
- Tennis court
- Swimming pools
