= Patrick Sandström =

Swedish footballer (born 1970)

Patrik Sandström
Personal information
- Date of birth: 7 October 1970 (age 56)
- Height: 1.72 m (5 ft 8 in)
- Position: Forward

Senior career*
Years	Team	Apps	(Gls)
1976-1987	Umedalens IF		
1988–1993	Umeå FC		
1994–1996	IFK Norrköping		
1997–1998	Umeå FC		
1999–2001	Örgryte IS		
2001–2003	Umeå FC		
2004-2007	Umedalens IF		
2008	Umeå FC		
- * Club domestic league appearances and goals

Patrick Sandström (born 7 October 1970) is a Swedish retired football striker.
