= Pinha (footballer) =

Cape Verdean footballer

Personal information
- Full name: Plínio Osvaldo Fonseca Brito
- Date of birth: 5 August 1972 (age 54)
- Height: 1.78 m (5 ft 10 in)
- Position: Midfielder

Youth career
- –1991: Académico de Viseu

Senior career*
Years	Team	Apps	(Gls)
1991–1993	Académico de Viseu	4	(1)
1993–1994	Penalva Castelo		
1994	Tondela	32	(15)
1995–1999	União de Leiria	5	(0)
1995–1996	→ Portimonense	31	(6)
1997	→ Ourense		
1997–1998	→ Académico de Viseu	25	(5)
1999	Académico de Viseu	9	(5)
1999–2000	Quarteirense		
2000	Pombal	4	(1)
2001	Tondela		
2001–2002	Sourense	23	(10)
2002–2003	Tourizense		
2003	Benfica de Luanda		
- * Club domestic league appearances and goals

Plínio Osvaldo Fonseca Brito, known as Pinha (born 5 August 1972) is a Cape Verdean former footballer who played as a midfielder. He also holds Portuguese citizenship.

== Career ==
Pinha made his professional debut in the Segunda Liga for Académico de Viseu on 12 January 1992 in a game against Portimonense.

He made his Primeira Liga debut for União de Leiria on 1 September 1996, when he played the whole game in a 3–0 loss to Leça.
