= Vladimir Solodukhin =

Russian footballer and coach

Personal information
- Date of birth: 8 April 1969 (age 57)
- Place of birth: Bryansk, Soviet Union
- Height: 1.74 m (5 ft 8 1/2 in)
- Position: Forward

Youth career
- Dynamo Bryansk

Senior career*
Years	Team	Apps	(Gls)
1992–1993	Dynamo Bryansk	56	(12)
1994–2001	Dnepr-Transmash Mogilev	201	(70)
2002	Dynamo Bryansk	33	(6)
2003	Mashuk-KMV Pyatigorsk	31	(8)
2004	Volochanin-Ratmir Vyshny Volochyok	9	(2)

Managerial career
- 2010–: Dynamo Bryansk (youth)
- * Club domestic league appearances and goals

Vladimir Solodukhin (Russian: Владимир Солодухин; born 8 April 1969) is a retired Russian professional footballer and a coach. Since 2010, he works as a youth coach at his hometown club Dynamo Bryansk.

== Honours ==
Dnepr-Transmash Mogilev

- Belarusian Premier League champion: 1998
