= Patric Karlsson =

Swedish footballer

Personal information
- Full name: Lars Patric Karlsson
- Date of birth: 9 November 1967 (age 58)
- Position: Forward

Senior career*
Years	Team	Apps	(Gls)
1985–1991	IFK Eskilstuna		
1987	→ IF Verdandi (loan)		
1992	IFK Luleå		
1993–1994	Lillestrøm	32	(9)
1994	Vålerenga IF	7	(2)
1995	IFK Norrköping		
1996	Örgryte IS		
1996–1997	Olympiacos Volos		
1997	Tromsø	12	(5)
1997–2000	BK Häcken		
2001	Eskilstuna City FK		
- * Club domestic league appearances and goals

Lars Patric Karlsson (born 9 November 1967) is a Swedish retired football striker.

He started his senior career in IFK Eskilstuna, including a spell in IF Verdandi. He took a spell in IFK Luleå before trying his luck in Norway and Lillestrøm SK in 1993. He also played the autumn of 1994 in Vålerenga IF. Returning to Sweden, he got one season in IFK Norrköping and half a season in Örgryte IS before going abroad again, to Greece's Olympiacos Volos. In the spring of 1997 he went to his third Norwegian club, Tromsø IL, before finishing off in Sweden's BK Häcken and Eskilstuna City FK.
