= Romeo Wouden =

Dutch former footballer

Nilson
Personal information
- Full name: Romeo Ricardo Wouden
- Date of birth: 24 December 1970 (age 55)
- Place of birth: Amsterdam, Netherlands
- Height: 1.71 m (5 ft 7 in)
- Position: Left winger

Senior career*
Years	Team	Apps	(Gls)
1988–1995	Dordrecht '90		
1995–1997	SC Heerenveen	54	(19)
1997	Boavista	1	(0)
1998	Veracruz		
1998–1999	Sparta Rotterdam	32	(2)
1999–2000	→ Dordrecht (loan)	22	(3)
2002–2003	Neptunus		
2003–2004	Zwart-Wit '28		
2004–2007	Neptunus		
- * Club domestic league appearances and goals

Romeo Ricardo Wouden (born 24 December 1970) is a Dutch former professional footballer who played as a left winger.

== Career ==
Wouden was born in Amsterdam, Netherlands. He made his Eerste Divisie league debut with FC Dordrecht during the 1988–89 season and played his last Eerste Divisie league game with club Sparta Rotterdam during the 1999–2000 season.
