= Jesper Thygesen =

Danish footballer (born 1969)

Personal information
- Date of birth: 20 September 1969 (age 57)
- Place of birth: Denmark
- Height: 1.84 m (6 ft 0 in)
- Position: Midfielder

Youth career
- Randers Freja

Senior career*
Years	Team	Apps	(Gls)
1991–1994	Ikast FS	45	(5)
1994–1998	Silkeborg IF	113	(23)
1998–1999	Brøndby IF	26	(3)
2000–2003	Silkeborg IF	92	(11)
2003–2005	Randers FC	51	(18)

International career
1985–1986	Denmark U17	17	(2)
1986–1988	Denmark U19	20	(1)
- * Club domestic league appearances and goals

Jesper Thygesen (born 20 September 1969) is a Danish football director, commentator, and former player. From 1991 to 2005, Thygesen played 296 games and scored 45 goals in the Danish Superliga. He played in the midfielder position, and represented Ikast FS, Silkeborg IF, Brøndby IF, and Randers FC, winning the 1998 Superliga and 1998 Danish Cup with Brøndby. He played 27 national youth team games, and represented the Denmark League XI national football team on seven occasions in 1997 and 1998.

He started his youth career with Randers Freja, before getting his breakthrough with Ikast FS. He returned to the Randers club, now known as Randers FC, in 2003, and ended his career with the team in 2005. He was a playing assistant manager in his final year in Randers FC. He was appointed as Director of the new Randers Football College in 2005, working there until the summer 2009. He served temporarily as attacking coach for Randers FC in the spring 2009. In his later years he has gained notorious status for publicly announcing his disdain for the Danish football team Silkeborg IF, in which he previously played. This sparked outrage amongst fans.

Jesper Thygesen is currently a sports commentator for the Danish TV-station TV3 Sport.

== Honours ==
Silkeborg

- UEFA Intertoto Cup: 1996
