= Şaban Yıldırım =

Turkish footballer

Personal information
- Date of birth: 25 January 1970 (age 56)
- Place of birth: Adapazarı, Turkey
- Position: Defender

Team information
- Current team: Karaman FK (manager)

Senior career*
Years	Team	Apps	(Gls)
1988–1992	Sakaryaspor		
1992–1993	Denizlispor		
1993–2000	Bursaspor		
1998–1999	→ Dardanelspor (loan)		
2000–2001	Sakaryaspor		

Managerial career
- 2002–2004: Sakaryaspor (youth)
- 2004: Sakaryaspor (assistant)
- 2004–2005: Sakaryaspor
- 2005: Samsunspor (assistant)
- 2005–2006: İstanbulspor (assistant)
- 2006: Mardinspor (assistant)
- 2007–2008: Sakaryaspor (assistant)
- 2009–2010: Elazığspor
- 2010–2012: Sakaryaspor
- 2012–2013: Kızılcahamamspor
- 2013–2014: Kartalspor
- 2014–2015: İnegölspor
- 2015–2016: Pendikspor
- 2019: Sakaryaspor
- 2019: Sarıyer
- 2019–2020: Sakaryaspor
- 2020-2021: Pendikspor
- 2021-2022: Inegölspor
- 2023: Karaman FK
- 2023-: 68 Yeni Aksarayspor
- * Club domestic league appearances and goals

Şaban Yıldırım (born 25 January 1970) is a retired Turkish football defender and later manager.
