= Constantin Enache =

Romanian cross-country skier (1928–2017)

Constantin Enache (July 4, 1928 – May 23, 2017) was a Romanian cross-country skier who competed in the 1950s. He finished 39th in the 18 km event at the 1952 Winter Olympics in Oslo. He was born in Buşteni.
