= Gaúcho (footballer, born 1972) =

Brazilian footballer

Personal information
- Full name: Eric Freire Gomes
- Date of birth: 22 September 1972 (age 54)
- Place of birth: Barreiros, Brazil
- Height: 1.81 m (5 ft 11 in)
- Position: Striker

Senior career*
Years	Team	Apps	(Gls)
1992	Guarani		
1993–1994	Ferroviário		
1995–1996	Sport	13	(1)
1996–2001	Estrela Amadora	133	(54)
1999	→ Ourense (loan)	18	(2)
2001–2004	Marítimo	83	(35)
2004	Busan I'Cons	11	(2)
2004–2006	Rio Ave	62	(14)
2006–2007	Feirense	26	(4)
2008	Beira-Mar	9	(0)
2008–2009	Moreirense	25	(5)
2009	Santa Cruz		
2010	Limoeirense	1	(0)
Total		381	(117)
- * Club domestic league appearances and goals

Eric Freire Gomes (born 22 September 1972), known as Gaúcho, is a Brazilian retired footballer who played as a striker.

He amassed Primeira Liga totals of 278 matches and 103 goals during ten seasons, mainly at the service of Estrela da Amadora.

== Football career ==
Born in Barreiros, Pernambuco, Gaúcho spent most of his career as a prolific goalscorer in Portugal, mainly with C.F. Estrela da Amadora for whom he played in five Primeira Liga seasons. In 1999–2000, his 21 league goals – third-best in the competition – propelled the Lisbon outskirts team to a final eighth place.

Gaúcho, who represented five other clubs in the country, also had brief spells in South Korea and Spain. In the 1998–99 campaign, loaned by Estrela, he only scored twice as CD Ourense suffered second level relegation; he played almost until his 40s, retiring after a stint in amateur football in his country.
