= Jens Jessen =

Danish footballer (born 1967)

Personal information
- Date of birth: 20 October 1967 (age 59)
- Position: Midfielder

Senior career*
Years	Team	Apps	(Gls)
1988–1990	Varde IF		
1991–2000	AaB	265	(31)
2000–2003	FC Midtjylland	76	(14)
Total		341	(45)
- * Club domestic league appearances and goals

Jens Jessen (born 20 October 1967) is a Danish former professional footballer who made 341 appearances in the Superliga for AaB and FC Midtjylland. He also played for Varde IF.
