= Patrick Goots =

Belgian footballer

Personal information
- Full name: Patrick Goots
- Date of birth: 10 April 1966 (age 60)
- Place of birth: Mol, Belgium
- Height: 1.83 m (6 ft 0 in)
- Position: Striker

Senior career*
Years	Team	Apps	(Gls)
1982–1986	Dessel	88	(43)
1986–1988	Lommel SK	59	(35)
1988–1990	Beerschot VAC	49	(20)
1990–1991	Kortrijk	31	(15)
1991–1994	Genk	98	(31)
1994–1996	Beveren	57	(28)
1996–1997	Sint-Truiden	27	(11)
1997–1999	Turnhout	67	(72)
1999–2004	Antwerp	153	(83)
2004–2006	Mechelen	61	(36)
2006–2008	RC Mol-Wezel	37	(14)
2009	Thes Sport	3	(1)
Total		730	(389)
- * Club domestic league appearances and goals

Patrick Goots (born 10 April 1966) is a Belgian former professional footballer who played as a striker.

== Club career ==
Goots was in the late 1980s, 90s and the beginning of the next decade, one of the best strikers in Belgium. At the level of the first division of the Belgian Pro League he scored a total of 156 goals. He was also remembered for his Ponytail hairstyle. His nickname was "Patje Boem Boem". He played at the highest level in Belgium until the age of 38 and in his last season in the Belgian Pro League he was the top scorer for Antwerp with eight goals. In the 2002–03 season, he scored two goals against Anderlecht in a 2–1 win.

Despite his goal-scoring ability, he never played for the Belgium national team.

In January 2009, Goots signed with fourth-tier side Thes Sport. In March 2009, due to a serious knee injury he was forced to retire and decided to start coaching-career.

== Personal life ==
When at Antwerp, Goots also played for a pubteam called Kempenzonen. In 2000 they were invited to help out at the Belgian heavy metal festival Graspop Metal Meeting. He stopped tending beer after 20 years of service in 2022.

== Honours ==
Lommel SK

- Belgian Third Division: 1986–87

Antwerp

- Belgian Second Division: 1999–2000

Individual

- Belgian Second Division top scorer: 1997–98, 1998–99, 1999–2000
- Goal of the Year: 2002
