= Ulrik Pedersen =

Danish footballer

Personal information
- Full name: Ulrik Bærholm Pedersen
- Date of birth: 11 January 1974 (age 52)
- Place of birth: Odense, Denmark
- Position: Defender

Youth career
- Dalum IF

Senior career*
Years	Team	Apps	(Gls)
1992–2001	OB		
2001–2006	Silkeborg		
2006–2011	Kolding FC		

Managerial career
- 2011–2014: FC Sydvest 05
- 2014–2015: Middelfart G&BK
- * Club domestic league appearances and goals

Ulrik Pedersen (born 11 January 1974) is a Danish former footballer and coach, who was also formerly the sporting director of Kolding IF.

== Career ==
During his active playing career, Pedersen played as a centre back for OB, Silkeborg and Kolding FC. For the former, he was part of the "Miracle in Madrid"-team which knocked out Real Madrid in the third round of the 1994–95 UEFA Cup.

In 2012, as head coach of FC Sydvest 05, Pedersen reached promotion to the Danish 2nd Division, the third highest division in Denmark.

He managed Middelfart G&BK for six months – between July 2014 and January 2015 – a chaotic period in which he was sent on Christmas holiday in mid-October after a disappointing start to the season. On 26 May 2016, Pedersen was presented as the new sporting director of Kolding IF, with whom he promoted to the Danish 1st Division (second highest division) in June 2019. After the promotion, he was released from his duties by Kolding IF.
