= 1994–95 UEFA Cup =

24th season of Europe's tertiary club football tournament organised by UEFA

- Dates: 9 August 1994 – 17 May 1995

Final positions
- Champions: (Italy) Parma (1st title)
- Runners-up: (Italy) Juventus

Tournament statistics
- Matches played: 126
- Goals scored: 361 (2.87 per match)
- Top scorer(s): Ulf Kirsten (Bayer Leverkusen); 10 goals

The 1994–95 UEFA Cup was won by Parma on aggregate over Juventus. Internazionale were the defending champions with a wild card, but were knocked out in the first round by Aston Villa.

== New format ==
Twenty-two national champions were demoted to the UEFA Cup after the locking of the Champions League. Following the final extinction of two historic countries, Yugoslavia and East Germany, nation 9 and nation 10 obtained a third slot, and England obtained this prize. Wales took the place of usually retired Albania. Czechoslovakia split between Czech Republic and Slovakia. The Faroe Islands and Israel had their own slot. A preliminary round would reduce the 91 clubs to the usual 64.

== Teams ==
The labels in the parentheses show how each team qualified for the place of its starting round:

- TH: Title holders
- LC: League Cup winners
- Nth: League position

First round
(Italy) Internazionale (TH)	(Germany) Bayer Leverkusen (3rd)	(Portugal) Sporting CP (3rd)	(Netherlands) PSV Eindhoven (3rd)
(Italy) Juventus (2nd)	(Germany) Borussia Dortmund (4th)	(Portugal) Boavista (4th)	(Netherlands) Vitesse (4th)
(Italy) Lazio (4th)	(Germany) Eintracht Frankfurt (5th)	(Portugal) Marítimo (5th)	(Netherlands) Twente (5th)
(Italy) Parma (5th)	(Belgium) Seraing (3rd)	(Russia) Rotor Volgograd (2nd)	(Austria) Admira Wacker (3rd)
(Italy) Napoli (6th)	(Belgium) Charleroi (4th)	(Russia) Dynamo Moscow (3rd)	(Austria) Tirol Innsbruck (4th)
(France) Marseille (2nd)	(Belgium) Royal Antwerp (5th)	(Russia) Tekstilshchik Kamyshin (4th)	(Greece) Olympiacos (3rd)
(France) Bordeaux (4th)	(Spain) Deportivo La Coruña (2nd)	(England) Blackburn Rovers (2nd)	(Turkey) Trabzonspor (3rd)
(France) Nantes (5th)	(Spain) Real Madrid (4th)	(England) Newcastle United (3rd)	(Switzerland) Sion (3rd)
(France) Cannes (6th)	(Spain) Athletic Bilbao (5th)	(England) Aston Villa (LC)	(Romania) Dinamo București (3rd)
(Germany) Kaiserslautern (2nd)			
Preliminary round
(Greece) Aris (4th)	(Bulgaria) Levski Sofia (1st)	(Cyprus) Anorthosis Famagusta (2nd)	(Slovakia) Slovan Bratislava (1st)
(Turkey) Fenerbahçe (2nd)	(Bulgaria) CSKA Sofia (2nd)	(Wales) Bangor City (1st)	(Slovakia) Inter Bratislava (2nd)
(Scotland) Aberdeen (2nd)	(Bulgaria) Shumen (4th)	(Wales) Inter Cardiff (2nd)	(Luxembourg) Grevenmacher (2nd)
(Scotland) Motherwell (3rd)	(Hungary) Kispesti Honvéd (2nd)	(Slovenia) Olimpija Ljubljana (1st)	(Belarus) Dinamo Minsk (1st)
(Switzerland) Aarau (4th)	(Hungary) Békéscsaba Előre (3rd)	(Slovenia) Mura (2nd)	(Faroe Islands) GÍ (1st)
(Denmark) Copenhagen (2nd)	(Norway) Rosenborg (1st)	(Albania) Teuta Durrës (1st)	(Faroe Islands) HB (2nd)
(Denmark) Odense (4th)	(Norway) Lillestrøm (3rd)	(Northern Ireland) Linfield (1st)	(Czech Republic) Slavia Prague (2nd)
(Romania) Universitatea Craiova (2nd)	(Latvia) Skonto (1st)	(Northern Ireland) Portadown (2nd)	(Moldova) Zimbru Chișinău (1st)
(Romania) Rapid București (4th)	(Ukraine) Shakhtar Donetsk (2nd)	(Republic of Ireland) Shamrock Rovers (1st)	(Estonia) Flora (1st)
(Sweden) AIK (3rd)	(Iceland) ÍA (1st)	(Republic of Ireland) Cork City (2nd)	(Lithuania) ROMAR Mažeikiai (1st)
(Sweden) Trelleborg (4th)	(Iceland) FH (2nd)	(Malta) Hibernians (1st)	(North Macedonia) Vardar (1st)
(Poland) GKS Katowice (2nd)	(Finland) Jazz (1st)	(Malta) Valletta (3rd)	(Armenia) Ararat Yerevan (1st)
(Poland) Górnik Zabrze (3rd)	(Finland) MyPa (2nd)	(Georgia (country)) Dinamo Tbilisi (1st)	(Azerbaijan) Turan Tovuz (1st)
(Israel) Hapoel Be'er Sheva (3rd)	(Cyprus) Apollon Limassol (1st)		

== Preliminary round ==
Team 1	Agg.	Team 2	1st leg	2nd leg
Anorthosis Famagusta (Cyprus)	4–1	(Bulgaria) Shumen	2–0	2–1
Aris (Greece)	5–2	(Israel) Hapoel Be'er Sheva	3–1	2–1
Bangor City (Wales)	1–4	(Iceland) ÍA	1–2	0–2
Kispesti Honvéd (Hungary)	5–1	(Moldova) Zimbru Chișinău	4–1	1–0
Grevenmacher (Luxembourg)	1–8	(Norway) Rosenborg	1–2	0–6
Aarau (Switzerland)	2–0	(Slovenia) Mura	1–0	1–0
Dinamo Minsk (Belarus)	6–5	(Malta) Hibernians	3–1	3–4 (aet)
Dinamo Tbilisi (Georgia (country))	4–1	(Romania) Universitatea Craiova	2–0	2–1
Copenhagen (Denmark)	4–1	(Finland) Jazz	0–1	4–0
Fenerbahçe (Turkey)	7–0	(Azerbaijan) Turan Tovuz	5–0	2–0
FH (Iceland)	2–3	(Northern Ireland) Linfield	1–0	1–3
Inter Bratislava (Slovakia)	1–3	(Finland) MyPa	0–3	1–0
Vardar (North Macedonia)	1–2	(Hungary) Békéscsaba	1–1	0–1
GÍ (Faroe Islands)	2–4	(Sweden) Trelleborg	0–1	2–3
Górnik Zabrze (Poland)	8–0	(Republic of Ireland) Shamrock Rovers	7–0	1–0
Teuta Durrës (Albania)	3–8	(Cyprus) Apollon Limassol	1–4	2–4
Lillestrøm (Norway)	4–3	(Ukraine) Shakhtar Donetsk	4–1	0–2
Motherwell (Scotland)	7–1	(Faroe Islands) HB	3–0	4–1
Odense (Denmark)	6–0	(Estonia) Flora	3–0	3–0
Olimpija Ljubljana (Slovenia)	5–3	(Bulgaria) Levski Sofia	3–2	2–1
CSKA Sofia (Bulgaria)	3–0	(Armenia) Ararat Yerevan	3–0	0–0
Portadown (Northern Ireland)	0–5	(Slovakia) Slovan Bratislava	0–2	0–3
ROMAR Mažeikiai (Lithuania)	0–4	(Sweden) AIK	0–2	0–2
Slavia Prague (Czech Republic)	6–0	(Republic of Ireland) Cork City	2–0	4–0
Skonto (Latvia)	1–1 (a)	(Scotland) Aberdeen	0–0	1–1
Inter Cardiff (Wales)	0–8	(Poland) GKS Katowice	0–2	0–6
Valletta (Malta)	3–7	(Romania) Rapid București	2–6	1–1

=== First leg ===
9 August 1994
19:30

Anorthosis Famagusta (Cyprus)	2–0	(Bulgaria) Shumen
Charalambous 19'; Nikolić 39'	Report

Antonis Papadopoulos Stadium, Larnaca
Attendance: 4,238
Referee: Alfred Wieser (Austria)

9 August 1994
20:00

Aris (Greece)	3–1	(Israel) Hapoel Be'er Sheva
Sapountzis 6', 65' (pen.); Ivan 90'	Report	Husyev 11'

Charilaou Stadium, Thessaloniki
Attendance: 14,425
Referee: Alfredo Trentalange (Italy)

9 August 1994
20:00

Bangor City (Wales)	1–2	(Iceland) ÍA
Mottram 53'	Report	Reynisson 42'; S. Jónsson 47'

Farrar Road, Bangor
Attendance: 3,426
Referee: Vítor Melo Pereira (Portugal)

9 August 1994
19:00

Kispesti Honvéd (Hungary)	4–1	(Moldova) Zimbru Chișinău
Illés 28' (pen.), 67' (pen.); Pisont 61'; Hamar 76'	Report	Timbur 60'

Bozsik József Stadion, Budapest
Attendance: 5,000
Referee: Theodoros Kefalas (Greece)

9 August 1994
19:00

Grevenmacher (Luxembourg)	1–2	(Norway) Rosenborg
Alves Silva 83'	Report	Leonhardsen 5'; Løken 89' (pen.)

Stade Op Flohr, Grevenmacher
Attendance: 1,200
Referee: Joseph Camilleri (Malta)

9 August 1994
20:00

Aarau (Switzerland)	1–0	(Slovenia) Mura
Kucharski 71'	Report

Stadion Brügglifeld, Aarau
Attendance: 4,800
Referee: José Pratas (Portugal)

9 August 1994
18:00

Dinamo Minsk (Belarus)	3–1	(Malta) Hibernians
Kashentsev 68'; Kachura 78'; Byalkevich 85'	Report	Lawrence 6'

Dinamo Stadium, Minsk
Attendance: 7,000
Referee: Georg Dardenne (Germany)

9 August 1994
17:00

Dinamo Tbilisi (Georgia (country))	2–0	(Romania) Universitatea Craiova
Kinkladze 25'; S. Arveladze 57' (pen.)	Report

Boris Paichadze National Stadium, Tbilisi
Attendance: 45,000
Referee: Gerald Ashby (England)

9 August 1994
19:00

Copenhagen (Denmark)	0–1	(Finland) Jazz
	Report	Ruhanen 32'

Parken, Copenhagen
Attendance: 4,390
Referee: Karol Ihring (Slovakia)

9 August 1994
19:00

Fenerbahçe (Turkey)	5–0	(Azerbaijan) Turan Tovuz
Uygun 16'; Kocaman 41', 61'; Steen Nielsen 80'; Taşkıran 87'	Report

Şükrü Saracoğlu Stadium, Istanbul
Attendance: 25,600
Referee: Atanas Uzunov (Bulgaria)

9 August 1994
21:00

FH (Iceland)	1–0	(Northern Ireland) Linfield
Magnússon 65' (pen.)	Report

Kaplakriki, Hafnarfjörður
Attendance: 989
Referee: Armand Ancion (Belgium)

9 August 1994
18:00

Inter Bratislava (Slovakia)	0–3	(Finland) MyPa
	Report	Kolkka 11', 31'; Rajamäki 49'

Štadión Pasienky, Bratislava
Attendance: 2,007
Referee: Vasyl Melnychuk (Ukraine)

9 August 1994
20:00

Vardar (North Macedonia)	1–1	(Hungary) Békéscsaba
S. Miloševski 27'	Report	Mracskó 45'

Stadion Gradski Park, Skopje
Attendance: 13,936
Referee: Daniel Roduit (Switzerland)

9 August 1994
20:00

GÍ (Faroe Islands)	0–1	(Sweden) Trelleborg
	Report	C. Karlsson 44'

Svangaskarð, Toftir
Attendance: 814
Referee: Stephen Lodge (England)

9 August 1994
18:00

Górnik Zabrze (Poland)	7–0	(Republic of Ireland) Shamrock Rovers
Szemoński 29', 83'; Bałuszyński 35' (pen.), 58'; Koseła 51'; Orzeszek 76'; Kubik 78'	Report

Stadion Górnika, Zabrze
Attendance: 6,001
Referee: Jef van Vliet (Netherlands)

9 August 1994
17:00

Teuta Durrës (Albania)	1–4	(Cyprus) Apollon Limassol
Fraholli 8'	Report	Špoljarić 58'; Krčmarević 74', 84'; Šćepović 77'

Niko Dovana Stadium, Durrës
Attendance: 3,632
Referee: Rémi Harrel (France)

9 August 1994
19:00

Lillestrøm (Norway)	4–1	(Ukraine) Shakhtar Donetsk
Hedman 2'; Johnsen 43'; T. Gulbrandsen 49'; Pedersen 68'	Report	Kryventsov 59'

Åråsen Stadion, Lillestrøm
Attendance: 6,835
Referee: Herbie Barr (Northern Ireland)

9 August 1994
20:00

Motherwell (Scotland)	3–0	(Faroe Islands) HB
Coyne 20'; McGrillen 34'; Kirk 83'	Report

Fir Park, Motherwell
Attendance: 7,517
Referee: John Ashman (Wales)

9 August 1994
19:00

Odense (Denmark)	3–0	(Estonia) Flora
Thorup 13'; Schjønberg 57' (pen.); Madsen 88'	Report

Odense Stadion, Odense
Attendance: 2,834
Referee: Jim McCluskey (Scotland)

9 August 1994
20:15

Olimpija Ljubljana (Slovenia)	3–2	(Bulgaria) Levski Sofia
Dosti 35', 38', 75'	Report	Sirakov 56', 73'

Bežigrad Stadium, Ljubljana
Attendance: 3,600
Referee: Periklis Vasilakis (Greece)

9 August 1994
18:15

CSKA Sofia (Bulgaria)	3–0	(Armenia) Ararat Yerevan
Tanev 21' (pen.); Koilov 44'; Shishkov 70'	Report

Stadion Balgarska Armia, Sofia
Attendance: 12,000
Referee: Ion Crăciunescu (Romania)

9 August 1994
20:30

Portadown (Northern Ireland)	0–2	(Slovakia) Slovan Bratislava
	Report	Timko 58'; Rusnák 74'

Shamrock Park, Portadown
Attendance: 1,612
Referee: Didier Pauchard (France)

9 August 1994
17:00

ROMAR Mažeikiai (Lithuania)	0–2	(Sweden) AIK
	Report	M. Johansson 27'; Simpson 62'

Mažeikių stadionas, Mažeikiai
Attendance: 5,000
Referee: Piotr Werner (Poland)

9 August 1994
16:30

Slavia Prague (Czech Republic)	2–0	(Republic of Ireland) Cork City
Šmicer 36'; Suchopárek 69'	Report

Stadion Eden, Prague
Attendance: 3,663
Referee: Hans-Jürgen Weber (Germany)

9 August 1994
17:30

Skonto (Latvia)	0–0	(Scotland) Aberdeen
	Report

Latvijas Universitātes stadions, Riga
Attendance: 5,000
Referee: Urs Meier (Switzerland)

9 August 1994
20:30

Inter Cardiff (Wales)	0–2	(Poland) GKS Katowice
	Report	Sermak 83' (pen.), 89'

Penydarren Park, Merthyr Tydfil
Attendance: 1,500
Referee: Juan Ansuátegui Roca (Spain)

9 August 1994
19:30

Valletta (Malta)	2–6	(Romania) Rapid București
J. Agius 16'; Zerafa 67'	Report	Chebac 5'; Vlădoiu 14', 46'; Țîră 74'; Chiriță 77'; Voinea 83'

National Stadium, Ta' Qali
Attendance: 5,000
Referee: Manuel Díaz Vega (Spain)

=== Second leg ===
23 August 1994
16:00

Shumen (Bulgaria)	1–2	(Cyprus) Anorthosis Famagusta
Iskrenov 43' (pen.)	Report	Assiotis 60'; Gogić 82'

Stadion Panayot Volov, Shumen
Attendance: 11,000
Referee: Vladimír Hriňák (Slovakia)

Anorthosis Famagusta won 4–1 on aggregate.

23 August 1994
16:30

Hapoel Be'er Sheva (Israel)	1–2	(Greece) Aris
Madar 46'	Report	Bougiouklis 30'; Milojević 55'

Arthur Vasermil Municipal Stadium, Be'er-Sheva
Attendance: 7,000
Referee: Werner Müller (Switzerland)

Aris won 5–2 on aggregate.

24 August 1994
20:00

ÍA (Iceland)	2–0	(Wales) Bangor City
Ingólfsson 8'; Ó. Þórðarson 22'	Report

Akranesvöllur, Akranes
Attendance: 1,200
Referee: Alain Hamer (Luxembourg)

ÍA won 4–1 on aggregate.

23 August 1994
18:00

Zimbru Chișinău (Moldova)	0–1	(Hungary) Kispesti Honvéd
	Report	Orosz 81'

Stadionul Republican, Chișinău
Attendance: 3,000
Referee: Lars Gerner (Denmark)

Kispesti Honvéd won 5–1 on aggregate.

23 August 1994
19:00

Rosenborg (Norway)	6–0	(Luxembourg) Grevenmacher
Strand 37', 87'; Bergersen 44'; Jakobsen 61'; Brattbakk 77', 84'	Report

Lerkendal Stadion, Trondheim
Attendance: 7,350
Referee: Patrick Kelly (Republic of Ireland)

Rosenborg won 8–1 on aggregate.

23 August 1994
17:30

Mura (Slovenia)	0–1	(Switzerland) Aarau
	Report	Skrzypczak 17'

Mestni stadion Fazanerija, Murska Sobota
Attendance: 4,500
Referee: Géza Kiss (Hungary)

Aarau won 2–0 on aggregate.

23 August 1994
19:00

Hibernians (Malta)	4–3 (a.e.t.)	(Belarus) Dinamo Minsk
Astrowski 32' (o.g.); Scerri 72'; M. Spiteri 90'; Carabott 117'	Report	Mayoraw 45' (pen.); Kashentsev 91'; M. Spiteri 106' (o.g.)

National Stadium, Ta' Qali
Attendance: 3,000
Referee: Walter Cinciripini (Italy)

Dinamo Minsk won 6–5 on aggregate.

23 August 1994
16:00

Universitatea Craiova (Romania)	1–2	(Georgia (country)) Dinamo Tbilisi
Pigulea 58'	Report	Kavelashvili 2'; Kinkladze 83'

Stadionul Central, Craiova
Attendance: 7,000
Referee: José María García-Aranda (Spain)

Dinamo Tbilisi won 4–1 on aggregate.

23 August 1994
17:00

Jazz (Finland)	0–4	(Denmark) Copenhagen
	Report	Mi. Johansen 52'; M. Nielsen 80'; Frandsen 82'; A. Nielsen 87'

Porin stadion, Pori
Attendance: 4,390
Referee: Timofejev (Estonia)

Copenhagen won 4–1 on aggregate.

23 August 1994
17:00

Turan Tovuz (Azerbaijan)	0–2	(Turkey) Fenerbahçe
	Report	Durmuş 83' (pen.); Uygun 87'

Mehdi Huseynzade Stadium, Sumgait
Attendance: 8,000
Referee: Lubomír Puček (Czech Republic)

Fenerbahçe won 7–0 on aggregate.

23 August 1994
20:30

Linfield (Northern Ireland)	3–1	(Iceland) FH
Beatty 15'; Gorman 30'; Peebles 36'	Report	Podunavac 20'

Windsor Park, Belfast
Attendance: 5,800
Referee: Hartmut Strampe (Germany)

Linfield won 3–2 on aggregate.

23 August 1994
17:30

MyPa (Finland)	0–1	(Slovakia) Inter Bratislava
	Report	Greguška 3'

Saviniemen jalkapallostadion, Anjalankoski
Attendance: 3,315
Referee: Yuri Chebotarev (Russia)

MyPa won 3–1 on aggregate.

23 August 1994
16:30

Békéscsaba (Hungary)	1–0	(North Macedonia) Vardar
S. Csató 59'	Report

Kórház utcai Stadion, Békéscsaba
Attendance: 4,100
Referee: Sabri Çelik (Turkey)

Békéscsaba won 2–1 on aggregate.

23 August 1994
20:00

Trelleborg (Sweden)	3–2	(Faroe Islands) GÍ
C. Karlsson 5' (pen.); Eriksson 11'; Rasmusson 48'	Report	H. Jarnskor 54'; M. Jarnskor 81'

Vångavallen, Trelleborg
Attendance: 1,867
Referee: Juha Hirviniemi (Finland)

Trelleborg won 4–2 on aggregate.

23 August 1994
19:00

Shamrock Rovers (Republic of Ireland)	0–1	(Poland) Górnik Zabrze
	Report	Bałuszyński 48'

RDS Arena, Dublin
Attendance: 926
Referee: Georges Ramos (France)

Górnik Zabrze won 8–0 on aggregate.

23 August 1994
19:00

Apollon Limassol (Cyprus)	4–2	(Albania) Teuta Durrës
Šćepović 23', 29'; Chatziloizou 60'; Pittas 88'	Report	Zalla 34'; Koça 75'

Tsirio Stadium, Limassol
Attendance: 3,000
Referee: Roelof Luinge (Netherlands)

Apollon Limassol won 8–3 on aggregate.

23 August 1994
18:00

Shakhtar Donetsk (Ukraine)	2–0	(Norway) Lillestrøm
Orbu 48'; Petrov 55'	Report

Shakhtar Stadium, Donetsk
Attendance: 22,000
Referee: Ryszard Wójcik (Poland)

Lillestrøm won 4–3 on aggregate.

23 August 1994
19:00

HB (Faroe Islands)	1–4	(Scotland) Motherwell
Hansen 57'	Report	Kirk 12', 68'; Davies 19'; Burns 86'

Svangaskarð, Toftir
Attendance: 480
Referee: Sven Kjelbrott (Norway)

Motherwell won 7–1 on aggregate.

23 August 1994
16:45

Flora (Estonia)	0–3	(Denmark) Odense
	Report	C. Hemmingsen 19', 48'; Tchami 69'

Kadrioru staadion, Tallinn
Attendance: 1,000
Referee: Karl-Erik Nilsson (Sweden)

Odense won 6–0 on aggregate.

23 August 1994
19:00

Levski Sofia (Bulgaria)	1–2	(Slovenia) Olimpija Ljubljana
Stoilov 2'	Report	Novak 24'; Pavlin 88'

Stadion Georgi Asparuhov, Sofia
Attendance: 8,500
Referee: Piero Ceccarini (Italy)

Olimpija Ljubljana won 5–3 on aggregate.

23 August 1994
17:00

Ararat Yerevan (Armenia)	0–0	(Bulgaria) CSKA Sofia
	Report

Hrazdan Stadium, Yerevan
Attendance: 7,200
Referee: Sándor Piller (Hungary)

CSKA Sofia won 3–0 on aggregate.

23 August 1994
18:00

Slovan Bratislava (Slovakia)	3–0	(Northern Ireland) Portadown
Faktor 13'; Tittel 32'; Rusnák 63'	Report

Tehelné pole, Bratislava
Attendance: 3,219
Referee: Lyuben Angelov (Bulgaria)

Slovan Bratislava won 5–0 on aggregate.

23 August 1994
19:00

AIK (Sweden)	2–0	(Lithuania) ROMAR Mažeikiai
Lidman 20', 62'	Report

Råsunda, Solna
Attendance: 2,446
Referee: Andrew Waddell (Scotland)

AIK won 4–0 on aggregate.

23 August 1994
19:00

Cork City (Republic of Ireland)	0–4	(Czech Republic) Slavia Prague
	Report	Hogen 33', 50'; Vávra 49'; Berger 89'

Bishopstown Stadium, Cork
Attendance: 1,567
Referee: Marnix Sandra (Belgium)

Slavia Prague won 6–0 on aggregate.

23 August 1994
20:30

Aberdeen (Scotland)	1–1	(Latvia) Skonto
Kane 90'	Report	Semjonovs 55'

Pittodrie Stadium, Aberdeen
Attendance: 19,000
Referee: Terje Hauge (Norway)

1–1 on aggregate. Skonto won on away goals.

23 August 1994
18:30

GKS Katowice (Poland)	6–0	(Wales) Inter Cardiff
Walczak 24'; Maciejewski 33', 44' (pen.); Jojko 74' (pen.); Wolny 77', 89'	Report

Stadion GKS Katowice, Chorzów
Attendance: 4,000
Referee: Bülent Yavuz (Turkey)

GKS Katowice won 8–0 on aggregate.

23 August 1994
16:30

Rapid București (Romania)	1–1	(Malta) Valletta
Țîră 35'	Report	G. Agius 21'

Stadionul Giulești, Bucharest
Attendance: 7,000
Referee: Manfred Schüttengruber (Austria)

Rapid București won 7–3 on aggregate.

== First round ==
Team 1	Agg.	Team 2	1st leg	2nd leg
AIK (Sweden)	2–2 (a)	(Czech Republic) Slavia Prague	0–0	2–2
Anorthosis Famagusta (Cyprus)	2–3	(Spain) Athletic Bilbao	2–0	0–3
Apollon Limassol (Cyprus)	4–5	(Switzerland) Sion	1–3	3–2 (aet)
Cannes (France)	9–1	(Turkey) Fenerbahçe	4–0	5–1
Bayer Leverkusen (Germany)	5–4	(Netherlands) PSV Eindhoven	5–4	0–0
Blackburn Rovers (England)	2–3	(Sweden) Trelleborg	0–1	2–2
Boavista (Portugal)	3–2	(Finland) MyPa	2–1	1–1
Borussia Dortmund (Germany)	3–0	(Scotland) Motherwell	1–0	2–0
Aarau (Switzerland)	0–1	(Portugal) Marítimo	0–0	0–1
Dinamo Minsk (Belarus)	1–4	(Italy) Lazio	0–0	1–4
Dinamo Tbilisi (Georgia (country))	2–5	(Austria) Tirol Innsbruck	1–0	1–5
Bordeaux (France)	5–1	(Norway) Lillestrøm	3–1	2–0
Tekstilshchik Kamyshin (Russia)	6–2	(Hungary) Békéscsaba	6–1	0–1
Twente (Netherlands)	4–5	(Hungary) Kispesti Honvéd	1–4	3–1
GKS Katowice (Poland)	1–1 (4-3 p)	(Greece) Aris	1–0	0–1
ÍA (Iceland)	1–8	(Germany) Kaiserslautern	0–4	1–4
Internazionale (Italy)	1–1 (3–4 p)	(England) Aston Villa	1–0	0–1
Linfield (Northern Ireland)	1–6	(Denmark) Odense	1–1	0–5
Napoli (Italy)	3–0	(Latvia) Skonto	2–0	1–0
Olimpija Ljubljana (Slovenia)	1–3	(Germany) Eintracht Frankfurt	1–1	0–2
Olympiacos (Greece)	1–5	(France) Marseille	1–2	0–3
CSKA Sofia (Bulgaria)	1–8	(Italy) Juventus	0–3	1–5
Royal Antwerp (Belgium)	2–10	(England) Newcastle United	0–5	2–5
Seraing (Belgium)	4–4 (a)	(Russia) Dynamo Moscow	3–4	1–0
Rapid București (Romania)	3–2	(Belgium) Charleroi	2–0	1–2
Real Madrid (Spain)	2–2 (a)	(Portugal) Sporting CP	1–0	1–2
Rosenborg (Norway)	2–4	(Spain) Deportivo La Coruña	1–0	1–4(aet)
Rotor Volgograd (Russia)	3–5	(France) Nantes	3–2	0–3
Slovan Bratislava (Slovakia)	2–1	(Denmark) Copenhagen	1–0	1–1
Trabzonspor (Turkey)	5–4	(Romania) Dinamo București	2–1	3–3
Admira Wacker (Austria)	6–3	(Poland) Górnik Zabrze	5–2	1–1
Vitesse (Netherlands)	1–2	(Italy) Parma	1–0	0–2

=== First leg ===
13 September 1994
19:00

AIK (Sweden)	0–0	(Czech Republic) Slavia Prague
	Report

Råsunda, Solna
Attendance: 3,190
Referee: Lyube Spasov (Bulgaria)

13 September 1994
18:00

Anorthosis Famagusta (Cyprus)	2–0	(Spain) Athletic Bilbao
Gogić 6'; Pounas 41'	Report

Antonis Papadopoulos Stadium, Larnaca
Attendance: 8,000
Referee: Atanas Uzunov (Bulgaria)

13 September 1994
19:15

Apollon Limassol (Cyprus)	1–3	(Switzerland) Sion
Krčmarević 35'	Report	Bonvin 71'; Marin 82', 86'

Tsirio Stadium, Limassol
Attendance: 8,000
Referee: Gheorghe Constantin (Romania)

13 September 1994
20:00

Cannes (France)	4–0	(Turkey) Fenerbahçe
Durix 51' (pen.); Kozniku 55', 81'; Horlaville 67'	Report

Stade Pierre-de-Coubertin, Cannes
Attendance: 9,747
Referee: Dermot Gallagher (England)

13 September 1994
20:20

Bayer Leverkusen (Germany)	5–4	(Netherlands) PSV Eindhoven
Kirsten 6', 16', 41'; Dooley 13'; Schuster 73'	Report	Ronaldo 11' (pen.), 45', 61'; Nilis 88'

Ulrich-Haberland-Stadion, Leverkusen
Attendance: 16,000
Referee: László Vágner (Hungary)

13 September 1994
21:00

Blackburn Rovers (England)	0–1	(Sweden) Trelleborg
	Report	Sandell 72'

Ewood Park, Blackburn
Attendance: 13,775
Referee: Hartmut Strampe (Germany)

13 September 1994
18:00

Boavista (Portugal)	2–1	(Finland) MyPa
Artur 1'; Nuno Gomes 63'	Report	Laaksonen 43'

Estádio do Bessa, Porto
Attendance: 1,500
Referee: John Ferry (Northern Ireland)

13 September 1994
18:00

Borussia Dortmund (Germany)	1–0	(Scotland) Motherwell
Möller 57'	Report

Westfalenstadion, Dortmund
Attendance: 35,400
Referee: Charles Agius (Malta)

13 September 1994
20:00

Aarau (Switzerland)	0–0	(Portugal) Marítimo
	Report

Stadion Brügglifeld, Aarau
Attendance: 5,400
Referee: Karol Ihring (Slovakia)

13 September 1994
18:30

Dinamo Minsk (Belarus)	0–0	(Italy) Lazio
	Report

Dinamo Stadium, Minsk
Attendance: 15,000
Referee: Marnix Sandra (Belgium)

13 September 1994
16:00

Dinamo Tbilisi (Georgia (country))	1–0	(Austria) Tirol Innsbruck
R. Arveladze 40' (pen.)	Report

Boris Paichadze National Stadium, Tbilisi
Attendance: 45,000
Referee: Michel Piraux (Belgium)

13 September 1994
18:45

Bordeaux (France)	3–1	(Norway) Lillestrøm
Dugarry 4'; Johnsen 38' (o.g.); Witschge 85'	Report	Pedersen 5'

Stade du Parc Lescure, Bordeaux
Attendance: 3,000
Referee: João Pinto Correia (Portugal)

13 September 1994
17:00

Tekstilshchik Kamyshin (Russia)	6–1	(Hungary) Békéscsaba
Gusakov 38'; Polstyanov 55', 90'; Volgin 58'; Filippov 80', 89'	Report	Szarvas 14'

Central Dynamo Stadium, Moscow
Attendance: 2,000
Referee: Adrian Porumboiu (Romania)

13 September 1994
18:00

Twente (Netherlands)	1–4	(Hungary) Kispesti Honvéd
Mols 38'	Report	K. Kovács 20', 52', 75'; Hamar 88'

Diekman Stadion, Enschede
Attendance: 6,000
Referee: Kenny Clark (Scotland)

13 September 1994
18:30

GKS Katowice (Poland)	1–0	(Greece) Aris
Maciejewski 12' (pen.)	Report

Stadion GKS Katowice, Chorzów
Attendance: 8,000
Referee: Gilles Veissière (France)

13 September 1994
22:00

ÍA (Iceland)	0–4	(Germany) Kaiserslautern
	Report	Hamann 33'; Anders 44'; Kuntz 53'; Kuka 60'

Laugardalsvöllur, Reykjavík
Attendance: 4,000
Referee: Herbie Barr (Northern Ireland)

13 September 1994
20:30

Linfield (Northern Ireland)	1–1	(Denmark) Odense
Anderson 86'	Report	Bailie 46' (o.g.)

Windsor Park, Belfast
Attendance: 3,485
Referee: Alain Sars (France)

13 September 1994
20:30

Napoli (Italy)	2–0	(Latvia) Skonto
Carbone 30' (pen.), 49'	Report

Stadio San Paolo, Naples
Attendance: 9,389
Referee: José Pratas (Portugal)

13 September 1994
20:30

Olympiacos (Greece)	1–2	(France) Marseille
Ivić 56'	Report	Ferrer 31'; Marquet 80'

Georgios Karaiskakis Stadium, Piraeus
Attendance: 32,000
Referee: Pierluigi Pairetto (Italy)

13 September 1994
18:00

CSKA Sofia (Bulgaria)	3–2	(Italy) Juventus
Mihtarski 43', 80'; Radukanov 68'	Report	Porrini 35'; Del Piero 75'

Stadion Balgarska Armia, Sofia
Attendance: 18,000
Referee: Kurt Röthlisberger (Switzerland)

UEFA invalidated this game and awarded a 3–0 win to Juventus because CSKA Sofia fielded an ineligible player, Petar Mihtarski.

13 September 1994
20:00

Royal Antwerp (Belgium)	0–5	(England) Newcastle United
	Report	Lee 1', 9', 51'; Sellars 40'; Watson 78'

Bosuilstadion, Antwerp
Attendance: 19,700
Referee: Ryszard Wójcik (Poland)

13 September 1994
20:00

Seraing (Belgium)	3–4	(Russia) Dynamo Moscow
Wamberto 66'; Schaessens 75'; Edmílson 90'	Report	Smirnov 19'; Cheryshev 26', 62'; Simutenkov 43' (pen.)

Stade du Pairay, Seraing
Attendance: 4,000
Referee: Alfredo Trentalange (Italy)

13 September 1994
16:00

Rapid București (Romania)	2–0	(Belgium) Charleroi
Chiriţă 18'; Vlădoiu 75'	Report

Stadionul Giulești, Bucharest
Attendance: 7,000
Referee: Piotr Werner (Poland)

13 September 1994
21:00

Real Madrid (Spain)	1–0	(Portugal) Sporting CP
Martín Vázquez 12'	Report

Estadio Santiago Bernabéu, Madrid
Attendance: 55,000
Referee: Frans Van Den Wijngaert (Belgium)

13 September 1994
19:00

Rosenborg (Norway)	1–0	(Spain) Deportivo La Coruña
Løken 52'	Report

Lerkendal Stadion, Trondheim
Attendance: 5,281
Referee: Sergei Khusainov (Russia)

13 September 1994
17:00

Rotor Volgograd (Russia)	3–2	(France) Nantes
Herashchenko 43'; Nechay 65'; Veretennikov 77'	Report	Ouédec 28'; N'Doram 81'

Central Stadium, Volgograd
Attendance: 31,000
Referee: Sándor Varga (Hungary)

13 September 1994
18:00

Slovan Bratislava (Slovakia)	1–0	(Denmark) Copenhagen
Tomaschek 76'	Report

Tehelné pole, Bratislava
Attendance: 7,570
Referee: Patrick Kelly (Republic of Ireland)

13 September 1994
18:30

Trabzonspor (Turkey)	2–1	(Romania) Dinamo București
Kaynak 7'; Boz 19'	Report	Ivan 28'

Hüseyin Avni Aker Stadium, Trabzon
Attendance: 20,000
Referee: Angelo Amendolia (Italy)

13 September 1994
19:30

Admira Wacker (Austria)	5–2	(Poland) Górnik Zabrze
Gager 5' (pen.), 60' (pen.); Schiener 18'; Klausz 66'; Wałdoch 90' (o.g.)	Report	Szemoński 27'; Orzeszek 42'

Bundesstadion Südstadt, Maria Enzersdorf
Attendance: 3,300
Referee: Oğuz Sarvan (Turkey)

13 September 1994
19:00

Vitesse (Netherlands)	1–0	(Italy) Parma
Gillhaus 50'	Report

Nieuw Monnikenhuize, Arnhem
Attendance: 9,000
Referee: Nikolai Levnikov (Russia)

15 September 1994
20:30

Internazionale (Italy)	1–0	(England) Aston Villa
Bergkamp 76' (pen.)	Report

Stadio Giuseppe Meazza, Milan
Attendance: 22,639
Referee: Peter Mikkelsen (Denmark)

15 September 1994
20:20

Olimpija Ljubljana (Slovenia)	1–1	(Germany) Eintracht Frankfurt
Šiljak 2'	Report	Legat 84'

Bežigrad Stadium, Ljubljana
Attendance: 3,200
Referee: Urs Meier (Switzerland)

=== Second leg ===
27 September 1994
17:00

Slavia Prague (Czech Republic)	2–2	(Sweden) AIK
Suchopárek 26' (pen.); Bejbl 57'	Report	Lidman 35'; Sundgren 83'

Stadion Eden, Prague
Attendance: 6,329
Referee: Antonio Martín Navarrete (Spain)

2–2 on aggregate. AIK won on away goals.

27 September 1994
20:00

Athletic Bilbao (Spain)	3–0	(Cyprus) Anorthosis Famagusta
Guerrero 18', 24'; Andrinua 89'	Report

Estadio San Mamés, Bilbao
Attendance: 35,000
Referee: Roger Philippi (Luxembourg)

Athletic Club won 3–2 on aggregate.

27 September 1994
20:15

Sion (Switzerland)	2–3 (a.e.t.)	(Cyprus) Apollon Limassol
Marin 90'; Orlando 103'	Report	Krčmarević 48'; Špoljarić 67'; Šćepović 77'

Stade de Tourbillon, Sion
Attendance: 8,000
Referee: Vítor Melo Pereira (Portugal)

Sion won 5–4 on aggregate.

27 September 1994
19:00

Fenerbahçe (Turkey)	1–5	(France) Cannes
Uygun 60'	Report	Tayfur 21' (o.g.); Horlaville 25', 62'; Micoud 50'; Vieira 77'

Şükrü Saracoğlu Stadium, Istanbul
Attendance: 33,000
Referee: Urs Meier (Switzerland)

Cannes won 9–1 on aggregate.

27 September 1994
20:45

PSV Eindhoven (Netherlands)	0–0	(Germany) Bayer Leverkusen
	Report

Philips Stadion, Eindhoven
Attendance: 22,400
Referee: Dermot Gallagher (England)

Bayer Leverkusen won 5–4 on aggregate.

27 September 1994
20:00

Trelleborg (Sweden)	2–2	(England) Blackburn Rovers
J. Karlsson 50', 85'	Report	Sutton 18'; Shearer 82'

Vångavallen, Trelleborg
Attendance: 6,730
Referee: Dick Jol (Netherlands)

Trelleborg won 3–2 on aggregate.

27 September 1994
14:00

MyPa (Finland)	1–1	(Portugal) Boavista
Grönholm 77'	Report	Artur 89' (pen.)

Saviniemen jalkapallostadion, Anjalankoski
Attendance: 3,616
Referee: Lubomír Puček (Czech Republic)

Boavista won 3–2 on aggregate.

27 September 1994
19:00

Marítimo (Portugal)	1–0	(Switzerland) Aarau
Paulo Alves 62'	Report

Estádio dos Barreiros, Funchal
Attendance: 9,000
Referee: John Blankenstein (Netherlands)

Marítimo won 1–0 on aggregate.

27 September 1994
20:30

Lazio (Italy)	4–1	(Belarus) Dinamo Minsk
Astrowski 45' (o.g.); Favalli 61'; Bokšić 74'; Fuser 84'	Report	Kachura 9'

Stadio Olimpico, Rome
Attendance: 33,850
Referee: José María García-Aranda (Spain)

Lazio won 4–1 on aggregate.

27 September 1994
19:35

Tirol Innsbruck (Austria)	5–1	(Georgia (country)) Dinamo Tbilisi
Cerny 4'; Stöger 31'; Daněk 35', 56'; Janeschitz 90'	Report	S. Arveladze 36'

Tivoli-Stadion, Innsbruck
Attendance: 9,000
Referee: Bülent Yavuz (Turkey)

Tirol Innsbruck won 5–2 on aggregate.

27 September 1994
17:15

Lillestrøm (Norway)	0–2	(France) Bordeaux
	Report	Zidane 2'; Fournier 13'

Ullevaal Stadion, Oslo
Attendance: 2,003
Referee: Ilkka Koho (Finland)

Bordeaux won 5–1 on aggregate.

27 September 1994
14:30

Békéscsaba (Hungary)	1–0	(Russia) Tekstilshchik Kamyshin
S. Csató 77' (pen.)	Report

Kórház utcai Stadion, Békéscsaba
Attendance: 2,000
Referee: Mateo Beusan (Croatia)

Tekstilshchik Kamyshin won 6–2 on aggregate.

27 September 1994
17:00

Kispesti Honvéd (Hungary)	1–3	(Netherlands) Twente
Illés 58' (pen.)	Report	Vurens 32'; Ellerman 67'; Boerebach 86'

Bozsik József Stadion, Budapest
Attendance: 7,000
Referee: Vasyl Melnychuk (Ukraine)

Kispesti Honvéd won 5–4 on aggregate.

27 September 1994
20:00

Aris (Greece)	1–0 (a.e.t.)	(Poland) GKS Katowice
Sapountzis 48'	Report
Penalties
Sapountzis (penalty scored); Konstantinidis (penalty scored); Stratilatis (penalty scored); Ivan (penalty missed); Kofidis (penalty missed)	3–4	(penalty missed) Maciejewski; (penalty scored) Kucz; (penalty scored) Świerczewski; (penalty scored) Nikodem; (penalty scored) Jojko

Charilaou Stadium, Thessaloniki
Attendance: 18,000
Referee: Jaap Uilenberg (Netherlands)

1–1 on aggregate. GKS Katowice won 4–3 on penalties.

27 September 1994
19:00

Kaiserslautern (Germany)	4–1	(Iceland) ÍA
Kuka 56', 88'; Wagner 60'; Haber 81'	Report	Gíslason 89'

Fritz-Walter-Stadion, Kaiserslautern
Attendance: 23,100
Referee: Brendan Shorte (Republic of Ireland)

Kaiserslautern won 8–1 on aggregate.

27 September 1994
19:00

Odense (Denmark)	5–0	(Northern Ireland) Linfield
Nedergaard 6', 85'; Schjønberg 25', 42' (pen.); Thorup 40'	Report

Odense Stadion, Odense
Attendance: 4,518
Referee: Marek Kowalczyk (Poland)

Odense won 6–1 on aggregate.

27 September 1994
18:00

Skonto (Latvia)	0–1	(Italy) Napoli
	Report	Buso 31'

Daugava Stadium, Riga
Attendance: 2,879
Referee: Karl-Erik Nilsson (Sweden)

Napoli won 3–0 on aggregate.

27 September 1994
17:00

Eintracht Frankfurt (Germany)	2–0	(Slovenia) Olimpija Ljubljana
Dickhaut 9'; Yeboah 85'	Report

Waldstadion, Frankfurt am Main
Attendance: 11,500
Referee: John Ashman (Wales)

Eintracht Frankfurt won 3–1 on aggregate.

27 September 1994
20:45

Marseille (France)	3–0	(Greece) Olympiacos
Cascarino 53', 89'; Ferreri 85'	Report

Stade Vélodrome, Marseille
Attendance: 38,593
Referee: Manuel Díaz Vega (Spain)

Marseille won 5–1 on aggregate.

27 September 1994
20:30

Juventus (Italy)	5–1	(Bulgaria) CSKA Sofia
Ravanelli 9', 65', 69', 81', 83'	Report	Mihtarski 90'

Stadio delle Alpi, Turin
Attendance: 15,000
Referee: Sándor Puhl (Hungary)

Juventus won 8–1 on aggregate.

27 September 1994
21:00

Newcastle United (England)	5–2	(Belgium) Royal Antwerp
Lee 11'; Cole 26', 39', 88'; Beardsley 36' (pen.)	Report	Kiekens 73'; Severeyns 74'

St James' Park, Newcastle upon Tyne
Attendance: 29,737
Referee: Rune Pedersen (Norway)

Newcastle United won 10–2 on aggregate.

27 September 1994
18:00

Dynamo Moscow (Russia)	0–1	(Belgium) Seraing
	Report	Schaessens 88'

Central Dynamo Stadium, Moscow
Attendance: 2,589
Referee: Finn Lambek (Denmark)

4–4 on aggregate. Dynamo Moscow won on away goals.

27 September 1994
20:00

Charleroi (Belgium)	2–1	(Romania) Rapid București
Balog 89'; Missé-Missé 90'	Report	Țîră 48'

Stade du Mambourg, Charleroi
Attendance: 12,000
Referee: Tore Hollung (Norway)

Rapid București won 3–2 on aggregate.

27 September 1994
22:00

Sporting CP (Portugal)	2–1	(Spain) Real Madrid
Sá Pinto 3'; Oceano 31'	Report	Laudrup 15'

Estádio José Alvalade, Lisbon
Attendance: 55,000
Referee: Jim McCluskey (Scotland)

2–2 on aggregate. Real Madrid won on away goals.

27 September 1994
20:00

Deportivo La Coruña (Spain)	4–1 (a.e.t.)	(Norway) Rosenborg
Bebeto 81', 99', 115'; Donato 107' (pen.)	Report	Brattbakk 93'

Estadio Riazor, A Coruña
Attendance: 22,000
Referee: Alfred Wieser (Austria)

Deportivo La Coruña won 4–2 on aggregate.

27 September 1994
19:00

Nantes (France)	3–0	(Russia) Rotor Volgograd
Ouédec 29', 61'; Loko 75'	Report

Stade de la Beaujoire, Nantes
Attendance: 25,000
Referee: Manfred Schüttengruber (Austria)

Nantes won 5–3 on aggregate.

27 September 1994
19:00

Copenhagen (Denmark)	1–1	(Slovakia) Slovan Bratislava
Højer 44' (pen.)	Report	Nigro 23'

Parken, Copenhagen
Attendance: 4,232
Referee: Hellmut Krug (Germany)

Slovan Bratislava won 2–1 on aggregate.

27 September 1994
14:00

Dinamo București (Romania)	3–3	(Turkey) Trabzonspor
Ceaușilă 6'; Niculescu 51'; Lică 82'	Report	Orhan 21'; Kaynak 23'; Boz 78'

Stadionul Dinamo, Bucharest
Attendance: 8,000
Referee: Gerald Ashby (England)

Trabzonspor won 5–4 on aggregate.

27 September 1994
19:00

Górnik Zabrze (Poland)	1–1	(Austria) Admira Wacker
Bałuszyński 30'	Report	Lytovchenko 45'

Stadion Górnika, Zabrze
Attendance: 9,000
Referee: Ladislav Gádoši (Slovakia)

Admira Wacker won 6–3 on aggregate.

27 September 1994
20:30

Parma (Italy)	2–0	(Netherlands) Vitesse
Zola 23', 71'	Report

Stadio Ennio Tardini, Parma
Attendance: 9,081
Referee: Hans-Jürgen Weber (Germany)

Parma won 2–1 on aggregate.

28 September 1994
16:15

Motherwell (Scotland)	0–2	(Germany) Borussia Dortmund
	Report	Riedle 56', 66'

Fir Park, Motherwell
Attendance: 11,000
Referee: Anders Frisk (Sweden)

Borussia Dortmund won 3–0 on aggregate.

29 September 1994
21:00

Aston Villa (England)	1–0 (a.e.t.)	(Italy) Internazionale
Houghton 41'	Report
Penalties
Parker (penalty scored); Staunton (penalty scored); Townsend (penalty scored); Whittingham (penalty missed); King (penalty scored)	4–3	(penalty scored) Bia; (penalty scored) Bergkamp; (penalty scored) Seno; (penalty missed) Fontolan; (penalty missed) Sosa

Villa Park, Birmingham
Attendance: 30,533
Referee: Joël Quiniou (France)

1–1 on aggregate. Aston Villa won 4–3 on penalties.

== Second round ==
Team 1	Agg.	Team 2	1st leg	2nd leg
Kaiserslautern (Germany)	1–1 (a)	(Denmark) Odense	1–1	0–0
AIK (Sweden)	0–3	(Italy) Parma	0–1	0–2
Boavista (Portugal)	2–3	(Italy) Napoli	1–1	1–2
Kispesti Honvéd (Hungary)	0–7	(Germany) Bayer Leverkusen	0–2	0–5
Marítimo (Portugal)	1–3	(Italy) Juventus	0–1	1–2
Dynamo Moscow (Russia)	2–6	(Spain) Real Madrid	2–2	0–4
Nantes (France)	4–1	(Russia) Tekstilshchik Kamyshin	2–0	2–1
Sion (Switzerland)	3–3 (a)	(France) Marseille	2–0	1–3
Tirol Innsbruck (Austria)	2–4	(Spain) Deportivo La Coruña	2–0	0–4
GKS Katowice (Poland)	2–1	(France) Bordeaux	1–0	1–1
Newcastle United (England)	3–3 (a)	(Spain) Athletic Bilbao	3–2	0–1
Rapid București (Romania)	2–6	(Germany) Eintracht Frankfurt	2–1	0–5
Slovan Bratislava (Slovakia)	2–4	(Germany) Borussia Dortmund	2–1	0–3
Trabzonspor (Turkey)	2–2 (a)	(England) Aston Villa	1–0	1–2
Trelleborg (Sweden)	0–1	(Italy) Lazio	0–0	0–1
Admira Wacker (Austria)	5–3	(France) Cannes	1–1	4–2

=== First leg ===
18 October 1994
20:15

Kaiserslautern (Germany)	1–1	(Denmark) Odense
Sforza 75'	Report	C. Hemmingsen 72'

Fritz-Walter-Stadion, Kaiserslautern
Attendance: 19,900
Referee: László Vágner (Hungary)

18 October 1994
21:00

Boavista (Portugal)	1–1	(Italy) Napoli
Sánchez 26'	Report	Carbone 58'

Estádio do Bessa, Porto
Attendance: 7,000
Referee: Hans-Jürgen Weber (Germany)

18 October 1994
16:00

Kispesti Honvéd (Hungary)	0–2	(Germany) Bayer Leverkusen
	Report	Münch 16'; Paulo Sérgio 80'

Bozsik József Stadion, Budapest
Attendance: 7,000
Referee: Rune Pedersen (Norway)

18 October 1994
22:00

Marítimo (Portugal)	0–1	(Italy) Juventus
	Report	Ravanelli 78'

Estádio dos Barreiros, Funchal
Attendance: 21,250
Referee: José María García-Aranda (Spain)

18 October 1994
18:00

Dynamo Moscow (Russia)	2–2	(Spain) Real Madrid
Simutenkov 65'; Cheryshev 69'	Report	Sandro 21'; Zamorano 73'

Central Dynamo Stadium, Moscow
Attendance: 7,000
Referee: Roger Philippi (Luxembourg)

18 October 1994
20:30

Nantes (France)	2–0	(Russia) Tekstilshchik Kamyshin
Ouédec 32' (pen.), 61'	Report

Stade de la Beaujoire, Nantes
Attendance: 20,000
Referee: Charles Agius (Malta)

18 October 1994
19:45

Sion (Switzerland)	2–0	(France) Marseille
Wicky 24'; Kunz 43'	Report

Stade de Tourbillon, Sion
Attendance: 15,700
Referee: Jorge Coroado (Portugal)

18 October 1994
19:00

Tirol Innsbruck (Austria)	2–0	(Spain) Deportivo La Coruña
Sané 29'; Stöger 56'	Report

Tivoli-Stadion, Innsbruck
Attendance: 11,000
Referee: Graziano Cesari (Italy)

18 October 1994
17:00

GKS Katowice (Poland)	1–0	(France) Bordeaux
Strojek 88'	Report

Stadion GKS Katowice, Chorzów
Attendance: 6,000
Referee: Svend Erik Christensen (Denmark)

18 October 1994
21:05

Newcastle United (England)	3–2	(Spain) Athletic Bilbao
Fox 9'; Beardsley 34' (pen.); Cole 56'	Report	Ziganda 72'; Suances 80'

St James' Park, Newcastle upon Tyne
Attendance: 32,140
Referee: Hellmut Krug (Germany)

18 October 1994
18:00

Slovan Bratislava (Slovakia)	2–1	(Germany) Borussia Dortmund
Rusnák 53'; Tittel 62'	Report	Tomaschek 17' (o.g.)

Tehelné pole, Bratislava
Attendance: 20,000
Referee: Marcello Nicchi (Italy)

18 October 1994
18:00

Trabzonspor (Turkey)	1–0	(England) Aston Villa
Kaynak 77'	Report

Hüseyin Avni Aker Stadium, Trabzon
Attendance: 27,500
Referee: Michel Piraux (Belgium)

18 October 1994
20:00

Trelleborg (Sweden)	0–0	(Italy) Lazio
	Report

Vångavallen, Trelleborg
Attendance: 7,303
Referee: Zbigniew Przesmycki (Poland)

18 October 1994

Admira Wacker (Austria)	1–1	(France) Cannes
Gager 36' (pen.)	Report	Bedrossian 67'

Bundesstadion Südstadt, Maria Enzersdorf
Attendance: 4,000
Referee: Adrian Porumboiu (Romania)

19 October 1994
17:00

Rapid București (Romania)	2–1	(Germany) Eintracht Frankfurt
Andrași 69'; Voinea 77'	Report	Furtok 65'

Stadionul Giulești, Bucharest
Attendance: 18,000
Referee: Alfred Wieser (Austria)

20 October 1994
18:00

AIK (Sweden)	0–1	(Italy) Parma
	Report	Crippa 73'

Råsunda, Solna
Attendance: 18,000
Referee: Gerald Ashby (England)

=== Second leg ===
1 November 1994
20:30

Napoli (Italy)	2–1	(Portugal) Boavista
Agostini 19', 35'	Report	Luciano 76'

Stadio San Paolo, Naples
Attendance: 27,656
Referee: Urs Meier (Switzerland)

Napoli won 3–2 on aggregate.

1 November 1994
17:30

Bayer Leverkusen (Germany)	5–0	(Hungary) Kispesti Honvéd
Kirsten 29', 65', 68'; Hapal 31'; Tolkmitt 60'	Report

Ulrich-Haberland-Stadion, Leverkusen
Attendance: 14,900
Referee: Loizos Loizou (Cyprus)

Bayer Leverkusen won 7–0 on aggregate.

1 November 1994
17:15

Real Madrid (Spain)	4–0	(Russia) Dynamo Moscow
Zamorano 48'; Redondo 77'; Dani 89', 90'	Report

Estadio Santiago Bernabéu, Madrid
Attendance: 75,000
Referee: Anders Frisk (Sweden)

Real Madrid won 6–2 on aggregate.

1 November 1994
17:00

Tekstilshchik Kamyshin (Russia)	1–2	(France) Nantes
Polstyanov 69'	Report	Ouédec 47', 63'

Central Dynamo Stadium, Moscow
Attendance: 1,800
Referee: Roy Helge Olsen (Norway)

Nantes won 4–1 on aggregate.

1 November 1994
20:45

Marseille (France)	3–1	(Switzerland) Sion
Libbra 47', 65'; Ferreri 73'	Report	Kunz 5'

Stade Vélodrome, Marseille
Attendance: 40,000
Referee: László Vágner (Hungary)

3–3 on aggregate. Sion won on away goals.

1 November 1994
20:30

Deportivo La Coruña (Spain)	4–0	(Austria) Tirol Innsbruck
Claudio 36', 38'; Donato 41' (pen.); Manjarín 72'	Report

Estadio Riazor, A Coruña
Attendance: 29,000
Referee: Dick Jol (Netherlands)

Deportivo La Coruña won 4–2 on aggregate.

1 November 1994
20:00

Bordeaux (France)	1–1	(Poland) GKS Katowice
Histilloles 18'	Report	Walczak 70' (pen.)

Stade du Parc Lescure, Bordeaux
Attendance: 25,000
Referee: Jim McCluskey (Scotland)

GKS Katowice won 2–1 on aggregate.

1 November 1994
19:15

Athletic Bilbao (Spain)	1–0	(England) Newcastle United
Ziganda 67'	Report

Estadio San Mamés, Bilbao
Attendance: 47,000
Referee: Angelo Amendolia (Italy)

3–3 on aggregate. Athletic Club won on away goals.

1 November 1994
20:20

Eintracht Frankfurt (Germany)	5–0	(Romania) Rapid București
Bommer 10'; Yeboah 13', 17'; Furtok 65', 67'	Report

Waldstadion, Frankfurt
Attendance: 12,000
Referee: Keith Burge (Wales)

Eintracht Frankfurt won 6–2 on aggregate.

1 November 1994
21:05

Aston Villa (England)	2–1	(Turkey) Trabzonspor
Atkinson 77'; Ehiogu 90'	Report	Kaynak 89'

Villa Park, Birmingham
Attendance: 23,858
Referee: Jaap Uilenberg (Netherlands)

2–2 on aggregate. Trabzonspor won on away goals.

1 November 1994
19:00

Cannes (France)	2–4	(Austria) Admira Wacker
Kozniku 48'; Charvet 87'	Report	Mayrleb 8'; Klausz 17', 55'; Schiener 24'

Stade Pierre-de-Coubertin, Cannes
Attendance: 12,000
Referee: Michel Zen-Ruffinen (Switzerland)

Admira Wacker won 5–3 on aggregate.

1 November 1994
19:30

Lazio (Italy)	1–0	(Sweden) Trelleborg
Bokšić 90'	Report

Stadio Olimpico, Rome
Attendance: 36,784
Referee: Karol Ihring (Slovakia)

Lazio won 1–0 on aggregate.

2 November 1994
17:45

Odense (Denmark)	0–0	(Germany) Kaiserslautern
	Report

Odense Stadion, Odense
Attendance: 14,200
Referee: Philippe Leduc (France)

1–1 on aggregate. Odense won on away goals.

2 November 1994
17:45

Parma (Italy)	2–0	(Sweden) AIK
Minotti 5', 16'	Report

Stadio Ennio Tardini, Parma
Attendance: 5,301
Referee: Patrick Kelly (Republic of Ireland)

Parma won 3–0 on aggregate.

2 November 1994
17:45

Juventus (Italy)	2–1	(Portugal) Marítimo
Ravanelli 34', 52'	Report	Paulo Alves 79'

Stadio delle Alpi, Turin
Attendance: 4,254
Referee: Rémi Harrel (France)

Juventus won 3–1 on aggregate.

3 November 1994
17:30

Borussia Dortmund (Germany)	3–0	(Slovakia) Slovan Bratislava
Möller 15'; Riedle 46', 68'	Report

Westfalenstadion, Dortmund
Attendance: 32,500
Referee: Nikolai Levnikov (Russia)

Borussia Dortmund won 4–2 on aggregate.

== Third round ==
Team 1	Agg.	Team 2	1st leg	2nd leg
Athletic Bilbao (Spain)	3–4	(Italy) Parma	1–0	2–4
Deportivo La Coruña (Spain)	2–3	(Germany) Borussia Dortmund	1–0	1–3(aet)
Eintracht Frankfurt (Germany)	2–0	(Italy) Napoli	1–0	1–0
Nantes (France)	6–2	(Switzerland) Sion	4–0	2–2
GKS Katowice (Poland)	1–8	(Germany) Bayer Leverkusen	1–4	0–4
Odense (Denmark)	4–3	(Spain) Real Madrid	2–3	2–0
Trabzonspor (Turkey)	2–4	(Italy) Lazio	1–2	1–2
Admira Wacker (Austria)	2–5	(Italy) Juventus	1–3	1–2

=== First leg ===
22 November 1994
19:00

Athletic Bilbao (Spain)	1–0	(Italy) Parma
Ziganda 48'	Report

Estadio San Mamés, Bilbao
Attendance: 45,000
Referee: Bo Karlsson (Sweden)

22 November 1994
21:15

Deportivo La Coruña (Spain)	1–0	(Germany) Borussia Dortmund
Bebeto 23'	Report

Estadio Riazor, A Coruña
Attendance: 26,000
Referee: Serge Muhmenthaler (Switzerland)

22 November 1994
17:45

GKS Katowice (Poland)	1–4	(Germany) Bayer Leverkusen
Nikodem 54'	Report	Kirsten 29', 44'; Lehnhoff 41', 64'

GKS Katowice Stadium, Chorzów
Attendance: 8,000
Referee: Anders Frisk (Sweden)

22 November 1994
20:30

Odense (Denmark)	2–3	(Spain) Real Madrid
Schjønberg 44'; Hjorth 78'	Report	Zamorano 67'; Amavisca 69'; Laudrup 90'

Odense Stadion, Odense
Attendance: 14,238
Referee: Gerd Grabher (Austria)

22 November 1994
18:30

Trabzonspor (Turkey)	1–2	(Italy) Lazio
Ünal 68'	Report	Rambaudi 60'; Negro 62'

Hüseyin Avni Aker Stadium, Trabzon
Attendance: 22,500
Referee: Antonio López Nieto (Spain)

24 November 1994
20:30

Eintracht Frankfurt (Germany)	1–0	(Italy) Napoli
Buso 55' (o.g.)	Report

Waldstadion, Frankfurt
Attendance: 31,000
Referee: Sándor Puhl (Hungary)

24 November 1994
20:30

Nantes (France)	4–0	(Switzerland) Sion
Loko 15'; Ferri 33'; N'Doram 54'; Makélélé 82'	Report

Stade de la Beaujoire, Nantes
Attendance: 34,210
Referee: Dermot Gallagher (England)

24 November 1994
19:30

Admira Wacker (Austria)	1–3	(Italy) Juventus
Binder 56'	Report	Conte 9'; Baggio 16', 42'

Bundesstadion Südstadt, Maria Enzersdorf
Attendance: 8,000
Referee: Leslie Mottram (Scotland)

=== Second leg ===
6 December 1994
19:00

Parma (Italy)	4–2	(Spain) Athletic Bilbao
Zola 22'; Baggio 39', 49'; Couto 64'	Report	Vales 57'; Guerrero 76'

Stadio Ennio Tardini, Parma
Attendance: 14,627
Referee: David Elleray (England)

Parma won 4–3 on aggregate.

6 December 1994
20:20

Borussia Dortmund (Germany)	3–1 (a.e.t.)	(Spain) Deportivo La Coruña
Zorc 50'; Riedle 116'; Ricken 119'	Report	Alfredo 102'

Westfalenstadion, Dortmund
Attendance: 35,400
Referee: Joël Quiniou (France)

Borussia Dortmund won 3–2 on aggregate.

6 December 1994
17:30

Bayer Leverkusen (Germany)	4–0	(Poland) GKS Katowice
Schuster 11'; Thom 13'; Scholz 15'; Hapal 28'	Report

Ulrich-Haberland-Stadion, Leverkusen
Attendance: 24,000
Referee: Ahmet Çakar (Turkey)

Bayer Leverkusen won 8–1 on aggregate.

6 December 1994
17:15

Real Madrid (Spain)	0–2	(Denmark) Odense
	Report	Pedersen 72'; Bisgaard 90'

Estadio Santiago Bernabéu, Madrid
Attendance: 50,000
Referee: Loris Stafoggia (Italy)

Odense won 4–3 on aggregate.

6 December 1994
20:30

Lazio (Italy)	2–1	(Turkey) Trabzonspor
Cravero 25'; Di Vaio 75'	Report	Mandıralı 74'

Stadio Olimpico, Rome
Attendance: 24,887
Referee: Bernd Heynemann (Germany)

Lazio won 4–2 on aggregate.

6 December 1994
20:30

Juventus (Italy)	2–1	(Austria) Admira Wacker
Ferrara 17'; Vialli 87'	Report	Wimmer 73'

Stadio delle Alpi, Turin
Attendance: 5,732
Referee: Nikolai Levnikov (Russia)

Juventus won 5–2 on aggregate.

7 December 1994
17:45

Napoli (Italy)	0–1	(Germany) Eintracht Frankfurt
	Report	Falkenmayer 54'

Stadio San Paolo, Naples
Attendance: 25,000
Referee: Mario van der Ende (Netherlands)

Eintracht Frankfurt won 2–0 on aggregate.

8 December 1994
20:30

Sion (Switzerland)	2–2	(France) Nantes
Herr 76'; Marin 82'	Report	Loko 30'; N'Doram 31'

Stade de Tourbillon, Sion
Attendance: 12,000
Referee: Hellmut Krug (Germany)

Nantes won 6–2 on aggregate.

== Quarter-finals ==
Team 1	Agg.	Team 2	1st leg	2nd leg
Bayer Leverkusen (Germany)	5–1	(France) Nantes	5–1	0–0
Eintracht Frankfurt (Germany)	1–4	(Italy) Juventus	1–1	0–3
Parma (Italy)	1–0	(Denmark) Odense	1–0	0–0
Lazio (Italy)	1–2	(Germany) Borussia Dortmund	1–0	0–2

=== First leg ===
28 February 1995
19:00

Bayer Leverkusen (Germany)	5–1	(France) Nantes
Lehnhoff 9'; Kirsten 18', 90'; Paulo Sérgio 78', 84'	Report	Ouédec 63' (pen.)

Ulrich-Haberland-Stadion, Leverkusen
Attendance: 21,400
Referee: Jorge Coroado (Portugal)

28 February 1995
17:15

Eintracht Frankfurt (Germany)	1–1	(Italy) Juventus
Furtok 73'	Report	Marocchi 36'

Waldstadion, Frankfurt
Attendance: 40,000
Referee: Peter Mikkelsen (Denmark)

28 February 1995
21:00

Lazio (Italy)	1–0	(Germany) Borussia Dortmund
Freund 69' (o.g.)	Report

Stadio Olimpico, Rome
Attendance: 54,000
Referee: Jaap Uilenberg (Netherlands)

2 March 1995
19:00

Parma (Italy)	1–0	(Denmark) Odense
Zola 50' (pen.)	Report

Stadio Ennio Tardini, Parma
Attendance: 6,319
Referee: Rune Pedersen (Norway)

=== Second leg ===
14 March 1995
20:45

Nantes (France)	0–0	(Germany) Bayer Leverkusen
	Report

Stade de la Beaujoire, Nantes
Attendance: 35,000
Referee: Piero Ceccarini (Italy)

Bayer Leverkusen won 5–1 on aggregate.

14 March 1995
18:00

Juventus (Italy)	3–0	(Germany) Eintracht Frankfurt
Conte 70'; Ravanelli 86'; Del Piero 90'	Report

Stadio delle Alpi, Turin
Attendance: 17,000
Referee: Manuel Díaz Vega (Spain)

Juventus won 4–1 on aggregate.

14 March 1995
20:00

Odense (Denmark)	0–0	(Italy) Parma
	Report

Odense Stadion, Odense
Attendance: 13,000
Referee: Atanas Uzunov (Bulgaria)

Parma won 1–0 on aggregate.

14 March 1995
19:45

Borussia Dortmund (Germany)	2–0	(Italy) Lazio
Chapuisat 11' (pen.); Riedle 90'	Report

Westfalenstadion, Dortmund
Attendance: 35,400
Referee: László Vágner (Hungary)

Borussia Dortmund won 2–1 on aggregate.

== Semi-finals ==
Team 1	Agg.	Team 2	1st leg	2nd leg
Bayer Leverkusen (Germany)	1–5	(Italy) Parma	1–2	0–3
Juventus (Italy)	4–3	(Germany) Borussia Dortmund	2–2	2–1

=== First leg ===
4 April 1995
19:00

Bayer Leverkusen (Germany)	1–2	(Italy) Parma
Paulo Sérgio 21'	Report	Baggio 48'; Asprilla 51'

Ulrich-Haberland-Stadion, Leverkusen
Attendance: 20,000
Referee: Manuel Díaz Vega (Spain)

4 April 1995
21:00

Juventus (Italy)	2–2	(Germany) Borussia Dortmund
Baggio 27' (pen.); Kohler 88'	Report	Reuter 8'; Möller 71'

San Siro, Milan
Attendance: 78,800
Referee: Marc Batta (France)

=== Second leg ===
18 April 1995
18:30

Parma (Italy)	3–0	(Germany) Bayer Leverkusen
Asprilla 4', 55'; Zola 67'	Report

Stadio Ennio Tardini, Parma
Attendance: 14,000
Referee: Guy Goethals (Belgium)

Parma won 5–1 on aggregate.

18 April 1995
20:30

Borussia Dortmund (Germany)	1–2	(Italy) Juventus
Júlio César 10'	Report	Porrini 7'; Baggio 31'

Westfalenstadion, Dortmund
Attendance: 35,400
Referee: Mario van der Ende (Netherlands)

Juventus won 4–3 on aggregate.

== Final ==
=== First leg ===
3 May 1995
20:30

Parma (Italy)	1–0	(Italy) Juventus
Baggio 5'	Report

Stadio Ennio Tardini, Parma
Attendance: 22,062
Referee: Antonio López Nieto (Spain)

=== Second leg ===
17 May 1995
20:30

Juventus (Italy)	1–1	(Italy) Parma
Vialli 35'	Report	Baggio 53'

San Siro, Milan
Attendance: 80,754
Referee: Frans Van Den Wijngaert (Belgium)

Parma won 2–1 on aggregate.

== Top scorers ==
Rank	Name	Team	Goals
1	(Germany) Ulf Kirsten	(Germany) Bayer Leverkusen	10
2	(Italy) Fabrizio Ravanelli	(Italy) Juventus	9
3	(France) Nicolas Ouédec	(France) Nantes	8
4	(Germany) Karl-Heinz Riedle	(Germany) Borussia Dortmund	6
5	(Italy) Dino Baggio	(Italy) Parma	5
5	(Federal Republic of Yugoslavia) Slobodan Krčmarević	(Cyprus) Apollon Limassol	5
5	(Denmark) Michael Schjønberg	(Denmark) Odense	5
5	(Italy) Gianfranco Zola	(Italy) Parma	5
9	(Italy) Roberto Baggio	(Italy) Juventus	4
9	(Poland) Henryk Bałuszyński	(Poland) Górnik Zabrze	4
9	(Brazil) Bebeto	(Spain) Deportivo La Coruña	4
9	(Poland) Jan Furtok	(Germany) Eintracht Frankfurt	4
9	(Turkey) Orhan Kaynak	(Turkey) Trabzonspor	4
9	(England) Rob Lee	(England) Newcastle United	4
9	(Germany) Marcus Marin	(Switzerland) Sion	4
9	(Brazil) Paulo Sérgio	(Germany) Bayer Leverkusen	4
9	(England) Andy Cole	(England) Newcastle United	4
9	(Ghana) Tony Yeboah	(Germany) Eintracht Frankfurt	4

== See also ==
- 1994–95 UEFA Champions League
