= 1994–95 Turkish Cup =

Türkiye Kupası

Tournament details
- Country: Turkey
- Teams: 76

Final positions
- Champions: Trabzonspor
- Runners-up: Galatasaray

Tournament statistics
- Matches played: 82
- Goals scored: 283 (3.45 per match)
- Top goal scorer(s): Shota Arveladze; Orhan Kaynak (6 goals each)

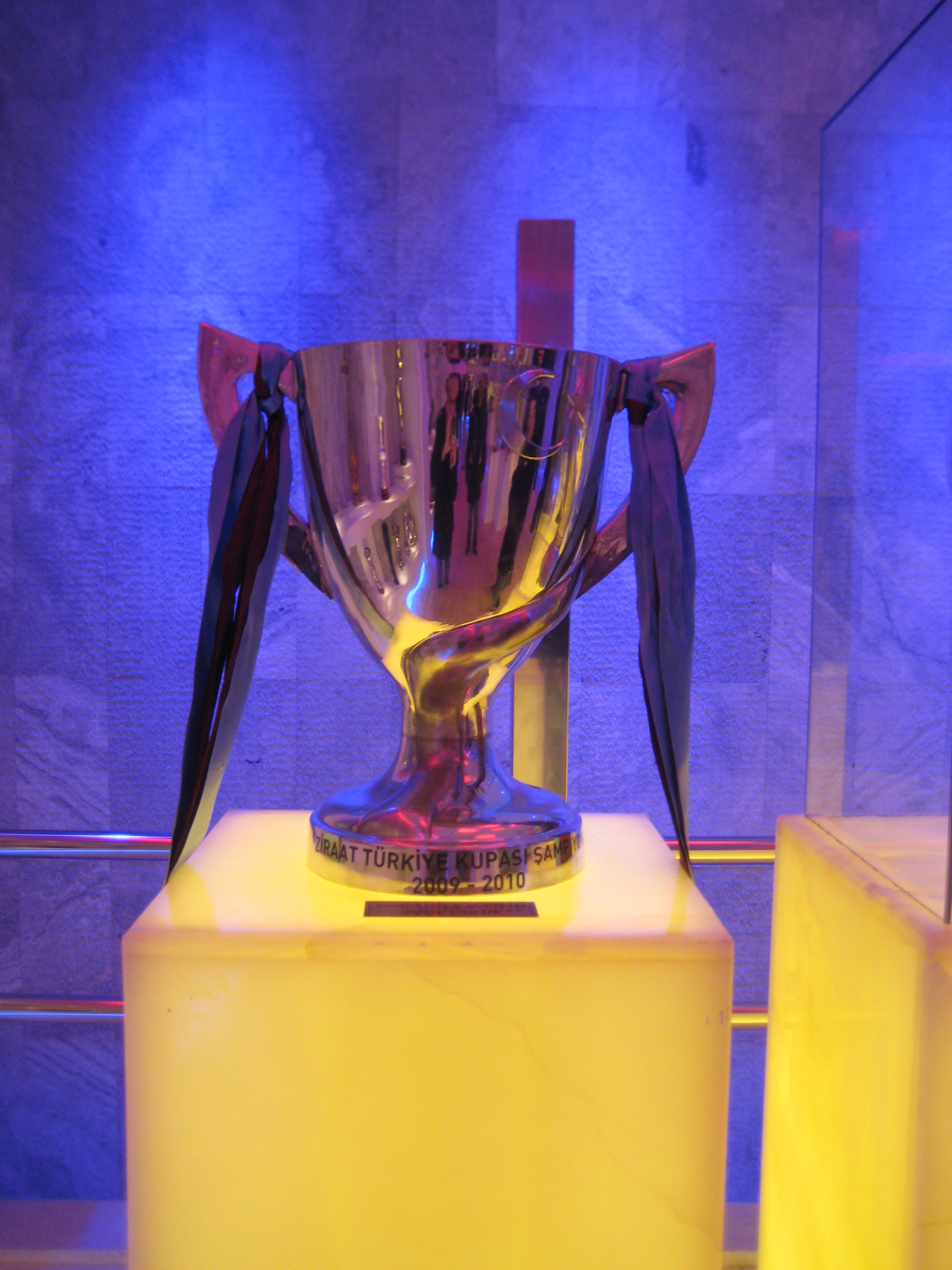
The Turkish Cup, located in the Trabzonspor Şamil Ekinci Museum.

The 1994–95 Turkish Cup was the 33rd edition of the tournament that determined the association football Süper Lig Turkish Cup (Turkish: Türkiye Kupası) champion under the auspices of the Turkish Football Federation (Turkish: Türkiye Futbol Federasyonu; TFF). champion under the auspices of the Turkish Football Federation (Turkish: Türkiye Futbol Federasyonu; TFF). Trabzonspor successfully contested Galatasaray on both legs of the finals. The results of the tournament also determined which clubs would be promoted or relegated.

== First round ==
The first round matches were played on the first team's home ground on 21 September 1994.

Team 1	Score	Team 2
Şanlıurfaspor	2–0	Batman Belediyespor
Çaykur Rizespor	2–0	Erzincanspor
Kahramanmaraşspor	2–1	Mersin Polisgücü
Nevşehirspor	1–4	Şekerspor
Erdemir Ereğlispor	3–1 (aet)	Kastamonuspor
Antalya Köy Hizmetleri	1–2 (aet)	Kemerspor
Düzcespor	4–0	İnegölspor
Güngören Belediyespor	1–2	Edirnespor
Soma Linyitspor	4–1	Yeni Afyonspor
Bergamaspor	7–3	Manisaspor

== Second round ==
Second round matches were played on 5 October 1994 on the first team's home ground.

Team 1	Score	Team 2
Kemerspor	1–3	Alanyaspor
Sakaryaspor	1–0 (aet)	Düzcespor
Yeni Turgurluspor	1–1 (6–7 p)	Bergamaspor
Aydınspor	1–3	Göztepe
Balıkesirspor	1–2	Soma Linyitspor
Bucaspor	2–3	Yeni Salihlispor
Muğlaspor	1–2	Karşıyaka
Anadolu Üsküdar	1–4	Sarıyer
Çorluspor	3–4	İstanbul BB
İstanbulspor	0–1	Gaziosmanpaşa
Edirnespor	0–1	Çanakkale Dardanelspor
Bakırköyspor	1–2	Kartalspor
Kahramanmaraşspor	2–0	Malatyaspor
Tarsus İdman Yurdu	2–4	Adanaspor
Hatayspor	0–1	Mersin İdman Yurdu
Çorumspor	5–1	Yeni Sincanspor
Şekerspor	2–4	Kardemir Karabükspor
Konyaspor	2–1	Ispartaspor
Zonguldakspor	4–1	Erdemir Ereğlispor
Eskişehirspor	4–1	Boluspor
Orduspor	1–0	Giresunspor
Erzurumspor	2–0	Çaykur Rizespor
Siirt Köy Hizmetleri	3–0	Adıyamanspor
Şanlıurfaspor	1–2	Diyarbakırspor

== Third round ==
Team 1	Score	Team 2
Alanyaspor	2–1 (aet)	Mersin İdman Yurdu
Sarıyer	4–0	İstanbul BB
Kartalspor	2–1	Gaziosmanpaşa
Yeni Salihlispor	4–3 (aet)	Karşıyaka
Soma Linyitspor	1–1 (4–3 p)	Bergamaspor
Göztepe	2–1	Çanakkale Dardanelspor
Kahramanmaraşspor	0–3	Adanaspor
Eskişehirspor	3–1	Konyaspor
Çorumspor	5–0	Sakaryaspor
Diyarbakırspor	3–2	Siirt Köy Hizmetleri
Zonguldakspor	2–2 (2–3 p)	Kardemir Karabükspor
Erzurumspor	3–1	Orduspor

== Fourth round ==
Team 1	Score	Team 2
Kartalspor	0–2	Sarıyer
Yeni Salihlispor	6–0	Göztepe
Soma Linyitspor	1–0	Alanyaspor
Adanaspor	4–1	Diyarbakırspor
Çorumspor	5–3 (aet)	Erzurumspor
Eskişehirspor	2–1	Kardemir Karabükspor

== Fifth round ==
Team 1	Score	Team 2
Bursaspor	3–0	Soma Linyitspor
Antalyaspor	0–2	Ankaragücü
Sarıyer	1–2 (aet)	Altay
Denizlispor	2–1	Yeni Salihlispor
Petrol Ofisi	6–1	Çorumspor
Vanspor	2–0	Zeytinburnuspor
Kayserispor	3–1 (aet)	Adana Demirspor
Adanaspor	1–2 (aet)	Eskişehirspor

== Sixth round ==
Team 1	Score	Team 2
Petrol Ofisi	0–2	Galatasaray
Bursaspor	1–1 (5–4 p)	Beşiktaş
Trabzonspor	3–0	Vanspor
Altay	2–2 (3–4 p)	Gaziantepspor
Denizlispor	1–2 (aet)	Fenerbahçe
Eskişehirspor	1–0	Gençlerbirliği
Samsunspor	1–0	Ankaragücü
Kayserispor	1–2	Kocaelispor

== Quarter-finals ==
Team 1	Agg.	Team 2	1st leg	2nd leg
Samsunspor	2–0	Kocaelispor	2–0	0–0
Bursaspor	3–6	Galatasaray	1–1	2–5
Fenerbahçe	5–0	Eskişehirspor	4–0	1–0
Trabzonspor	9–2	Gaziantepspor	7–0	2–2

== Semi-finals ==
=== Summary table ===
Team 1	Agg.	Team 2	1st leg	2nd leg
Fenerbahçe	2–2 (6–7 p)	Galatasaray	1–1	1–1
Samsunspor	0–5	Trabzonspor	0–4	0–1

=== 1st leg ===
8 February 1995 Semi-final	Fenerbahçe	1–1	Galatasaray	Istanbul
19:00 EET (UTC+02)	Aykut 72' (pen.)		Saffet 69'	Stadium: Şükrü Saracoğlu Stadium; Referee: Ahmet Çakar

22 February 1995 Semi-final	Samsunspor	0–4	Trabzonspor	Samsun
19:00 EET (UTC+02)			Orhan 3'; Soner 12'; Tolunay 28'; Hami 84'	Stadium: Samsun 19 Mayıs Stadium; Referee: Metin Tokat

=== 2nd leg ===
22 February 1995 Semi-final	Galatasaray	1–1 (a.e.t.) (7–6 p)	Fenerbahçe	Istanbul
19:00 EET (UTC+02)	Suat 52'		Aygün 22'	Stadium: Ali Sami Yen Stadium; Referee: Oğuz Sarvan
	Penalties
	Saffet (penalty scored); Hakan Ş. (penalty scored); Feti Okuroğlu (penalty scored); Hamza Hamzaoğlu (penalty scored); Mert (penalty scored); Bülent (penalty scored); Okan (penalty scored)		(penalty scored) Bülent; (penalty scored) Kemalettin; (penalty scored) Oğuz; (penalty scored) Nielse; (penalty scored) Mecnur; (penalty scored) Hakan T. (penalty missed) Aygün

15 March 1995 Semi-final	Trabzonspor	1–0	Samsunspor	Trabzon
15:00 EET (UTC+02)	Sinan 57' (o.g.)			Stadium: Hüseyin Avni Aker Stadium; Referee: Orhan Erdemir

== Final ==
=== 1st leg ===
5 April 1995 Final	Galatasaray	2–3	Trabzonspor	Istanbul, Turkey
19:00 EEST (UTC+03)	Sedat 66'; Tugay 84' (pen.)		Hami 11', 88'; Arveladze 60'	Stadium: Ali Sami Yen Stadium; Referee: Mustafa Çulcu

=== 2nd leg ===
12 April 1995 Final	Trabzonspor	1–0	Galatasaray	Trabzon, Turkey
19:00 EEST (UTC+03)	Orhan 16'			Stadium: Hüseyin Avni Aker Stadium; Referee: Ayhan Yücebilgiç

== See also ==
- 1994–95 1.Lig
