= Krzysztof Maciejewski =

Krzysztof Maciejewski can refer to:

- Krzysztof Maciejewski (footballer)
- Krzysztof Maciejewski (politician)
