= Andreas Hansen =

Andreas Hansen may refer to:

- Andreas Nicolai Hansen (1798–1893), Danish businessman and landowner
- Andreas Falkvard Hansen (born 1966), Faroese football defender
- Andreas Granskov Hansen (born 1989), Danish footballer
- Andreas Hansen (footballer) (born 1995), Danish football goalkeeper
