= List of Linfield F.C. players =

Linfield F.C. is a professional association football club based in Belfast, Northern Ireland. The club plays in the NIFL Premiership, the highest level of the Northern Ireland Football League. They have played at their current home ground, Windsor Park, since 1905. Previous to this they had played at Ulsterville Avenue from 1889 until 1905 and The Meadow from their foundation in 1886 to 1889. They were one of the founding clubs of the league in 1890, and since that time the club has competed in numerous nationally and internationally organised competitions.

Players who have made 100 or more appearances for Linfield are listed below. Players are listed according to the date their first contract was signed with the club.

Forward Tommy Dickson is Linfield's record goal scorer, with 454 goals in 660 appearances between 1948 and 1965. A one-club man and former club captain, defender Noel Bailie holds the record for the most Linfield appearances, playing 1,013 times for the club during a career that spanned 22 years between his debut in 1989 and his retirement in 2011.

== Players ==
As of end of the 2017–18 season.

- Notes:
  - Appearances and goals are counted for competitive matches in all first-team competitions. Wartime matches and friendly/pre-season matches are excluded.
  - Substitute appearances are listed in parentheses (if known) and are included in the total.
  - Players listed in **bold** are still active at the club.

Player	Position	Years active	Appearances (inc. as sub)	Goals	Goals/games ratio
(Ireland) Joe Bambrick	FW	1927–1935	183	286	1.56
(Northern Ireland) Tommy Dickson	FW	1948–1965	660	454	0.69
(Northern Ireland) Phil Scott	FW	1958–1962; 1963–1973	400	220	0.55
(Northern Ireland) Trevor Anderson	FW	1979–1987	327	96	0.29
(Northern Ireland) David Jeffrey	DF	1982–1992	269	69	0.26
(Northern Ireland) Stephen Baxter	FW	1987–1993	219 (50)	102	0.47
(Northern Ireland) Noel Bailie	DF	1989–2011	1,013 (24)	25	0.02
(Northern Ireland) Stephen Beatty	MF	1990–2001	455	52	0.11
(Republic of Ireland) Dessie Gorman	FW	1992–1997	166 (15)	56	0.34
(Northern Ireland) William Murphy	DF	1997–2013	639 (12)	48	0.08
(Northern Ireland) Glenn Ferguson	FW	1998–2009	515 (41)	285	0.55
(Northern Ireland) Michael Gault	MF	1999–2014	480 (50)	30	0.06
(Northern Ireland) Alan Mannus	GK	2000–2009	366	1	0.01
(Northern Ireland) Peter Thompson	FW	2001–2008; 2010–2015	418 (73)	230	0.55
(Scotland) Steven Douglas	DF	2003–2013	266 (29)	13	0.05
(Northern Ireland) Paul McAreavey	MF	2003–2009	180 (33)	39	0.22
(Northern Ireland) Aidan O'Kane	MF	2003–2011	268 (75)	31	0.12
(Northern Ireland) **Jamie Mulgrew**	MF	2005–present	389 (53)	38	0.09
(Northern Ireland) Aaron Burns	MF	2008–2012; 2013–2017	273 (73)	91	0.33
