= Jens Madsen =

Jens Madsen can refer to:

- Jens Christian Madsen (born 1970), Danish footballer
- Jens Christian Mosegaard Madsen (born 1972), Danish footballer
- Jens-Erik Madsen (born 1981), Danish cyclist
