= İrfan Kaynak =

Turkish footballer (1956–1992)

Personal information
- Date of birth: 20 January 1956
- Place of birth: Adana, Turkey
- Date of death: 25 October 1992 (aged 36)
- Place of death: Adana, Turkey
- Position: Forward

Youth career
- Ceyhanspor

Senior career*
Years	Team	Apps	(Gls)
1973–1974	Mersin İdmanyurdu	2	(0)
1974–1983	Adanaspor	76	(10)
- * Club domestic league appearances and goals

İrfan Kaynak (20 January 1956 – 25 October 1992) was a Turkish footballer who played as a forward in the Süper Lig with Adanaspor.

== Personal life and death ==
Kaynak was born in to a large family of eight children. His brothers Orhan, Reşit, Kaynak, İlhan and Ayhan were all professional footballers.

He died in 1993 of a heart attack, the same condition that killed his brothers Reşit and Kaynak.
