= 1993–94 Irish League =

Irish League
- Season: 1993–94
- Champions: Linfield; 42nd Irish title
- Matches played: 240
- Goals scored: 736 (3.07 per match)
- Top goalscorer: Darren Erskine; Stephen McBride (22 goals each)

Location of teams in the Irish League from 1990–95
Location of Belfast-based teams in the Irish League from 1990–95

The 1993–94 Irish League was the 93rd edition of the Irish League, the highest level of league competition in Northern Irish football. The league consisted of 16 teams, and Linfield won the championship.

== League standings ==
Pos	Team	Pld	W	D	L	GF	GA	GD	Pts	Qualification
1	Linfield (C)	30	21	7	2	63	22	+41	70	Qualification for the UEFA Cup qualifying round
2	Portadown	30	20	8	2	76	21	+55	68	Qualification for the UEFA Cup qualifying round
3	Glenavon	30	21	5	4	69	29	+40	68	
4	Crusaders	30	17	7	6	53	30	+23	58	
5	Bangor	30	14	3	13	45	49	−4	45	Qualification for the Cup Winners' Cup first round
6	Ards	30	13	2	15	59	55	+4	41	
7	Distillery	30	11	8	11	41	40	+1	41	
8	Cliftonville	30	11	10	9	41	32	+9	40 (Note: 3 points deducted)	
9	Glentoran	30	10	7	13	46	43	+3	37	
10	Coleraine	30	10	7	13	41	50	−9	37	
11	Ballymena United	30	9	6	15	37	55	−18	33	
12	Ballyclare Comrades	30	9	6	15	35	57	−22	33	
13	Carrick Rangers	30	6	7	17	42	81	−39	25	
14	Newry Town	30	5	9	16	26	52	−26	24	
15	Larne	30	5	7	18	30	62	−32	22	
16	Omagh Town	30	6	5	19	32	58	−26	14 (Note: 9 points deducted)	

Source: rsssf.com
(C) Champions

== Results ==
Home \ Away	ARD	BAN	BLC	BLM	CRK	CLI	COL	CRU	DIS	GLV	GLT	LRN	LIN	NEW	OMA	POR
Ards		5–3	2–0	1–2	3–3	1–2	3–2	2–4	1–0	4–1	1–0	4–0	0–3	9–0	3–3	1–2
Bangor	0–2		4–2	1–0	5–1	2–1	2–0	2–1	1–2	1–0	0–3	2–1	0–1	3–1	4–2	1–1
Ballyclare Comrades	1–0	3–0		1–1	0–3	0–0	0–1	0–0	2–2	1–1	2–1	1–0	1–2	1–2	4–1	2–0
Ballymena United	0–3	1–2	2–3		0–2	2–1	1–0	0–0	1–1	1–3	3–2	2–0	0–1	0–0	1–3	1–1
Carrick Rangers	1–2	3–2	2–4	2–5		1–0	1–1	3–2	2–2	1–5	1–2	2–1	1–2	0–3	0–0	1–6
Cliftonville	6–2	1–0	0–2	0–2	3–1		1–2	2–1	1–1	0–1	1–1	0–1	2–2	1–1	1–1	1–1
Coleraine	4–0	3–1	3–2	5–2	3–2	0–0		0–2	0–2	0–2	1–1	2–1	2–2	1–1	2–0	0–1
Crusaders	3–1	4–0	4–0	1–0	3–0	1–1	2–0		2–2	2–4	3–2	3–1	1–1	2–1	3–0	1–1
Distillery	3–2	1–2	4–0	4–1	2–0	1–2	1–2	1–2		1–1	0–2	0–1	2–2	1–0	1–1	1–6
Glenavon	1–0	3–1	5–2	3–2	8–0	0–1	2–1	2–0	1–0		2–1	6–1	3–2	5–0	1–0	2–2
Glentoran	2–0	2–2	3–0	1–1	3–1	1–4	5–3	0–1	0–2	0–1		0–0	0–2	4–0	3–1	1–3
Larne	4–1	1–1	1–1	5–1	1–1	0–3	3–3	1–1	1–2	0–2	2–2		0–2	0–3	4–2	0–5
Linfield	2–1	1–0	5–0	2–1	2–1	3–1	5–0	0–1	3–0	0–0	2–0	3–0		1–0	4–1	2–2
Newry Town	1–3	1–2	2–0	1–2	2–2	0–3	0–0	0–2	0–1	1–1	1–1	2–0	1–1		1–2	0–2
Omagh Town	1–2	0–1	2–0	1–2	3–3	0–1	1–0	0–1	0–1	1–2	2–3	1–0	1–3	1–0		1–2
Portadown	1–0	2–0	4–0	5–0	6–1	1–1	4–0	3–0	1–0	3–1	1–0	4–0	0–2	1–1	5–0	

Source: Irish League Archive
Legend: Blue = home team win; Yellow = draw; Red = away team win.
