= İlhan Kaynak =

Turkish footballer

Personal information
- Place of birth: Adana, Turkey
- Position: Forward

Senior career*
Years	Team	Apps	(Gls)
1976	Adanaspor	1	(0)
- * Club domestic league appearances and goals

İlhan Kaynak is a Turkish former footballer who played one game in the Süper Lig with Adanaspor.

== Career ==
A forward, İlhan made one professional appearance in football with Adanaspor, in a 1–1 Süper Lig tie with İstanbulspor A.Ş. on 28 May 1972.

== Personal life ==
İlhan was born in to a large family of eight children. His brothers Orhan, Reşit, İrfan, Kayhan and Ayhan were all professional footballers.
