= Reşit Kaynak =

Turkish footballer (1952–1999)

Personal information
- Date of birth: 12 August 1952
- Place of birth: Adana, Turkey
- Date of death: 26 March 1999 (aged 46)
- Place of death: Bursa, Turkey
- Height: 1.87 m (6 ft 2 in)
- Position: Forward

Youth career
- 1961–1967: Ceyhan Akınspor

Senior career*
Years	Team	Apps	(Gls)
1967–1968	Ceyhan Akınspor	12	(5)
1968–1975	Adanaspor	104	(56)
1975–1978	Beşiktaş J.K.	57	(24)
1978–1980	Diyarbakırspor	68	(28)
1980–1981	Galatasaray	3	(0)
1980–1981	→Gaziantepspor (loan)	14	(5)
1981–1984	Gençlerbirliği S.K.	75	(43)
1984–1986	Adanaspor	58	(32)
1986–1988	Ayvalıkgücü Belediyespor	47	(17)
1988–1989	Hatayspor	25	(7)

International career
1971–1972	Turkey U18	3	(0)
1973–1976	Turkey U21	6	(0)
1976–1979	Turkey	4	(1)

Managerial career
- 1992–1993: Ereğlispor
- * Club domestic league appearances and goals

Reşit Kaynak (12 August 1952 – 26 March 1999) was a Turkish professional footballer best known for his stints in the Süper Lig with Adanaspor. A forward, he was a prolific goalscorer in the top divisions of Turkey, and was briefly an international footballer for Turkey.

== Personal life and death ==
Reşit was born in to a large family of eight children. His brothers Orhan, Kayhan, İrfan, İlhan and Ayhan were all professional footballers.

He died on 26 March 1999 of a heart attack, the same condition that killed his brothers Kayhan and İrfan.
