= Michael Hemmingsen =

Danish footballer and manager (born 1967)

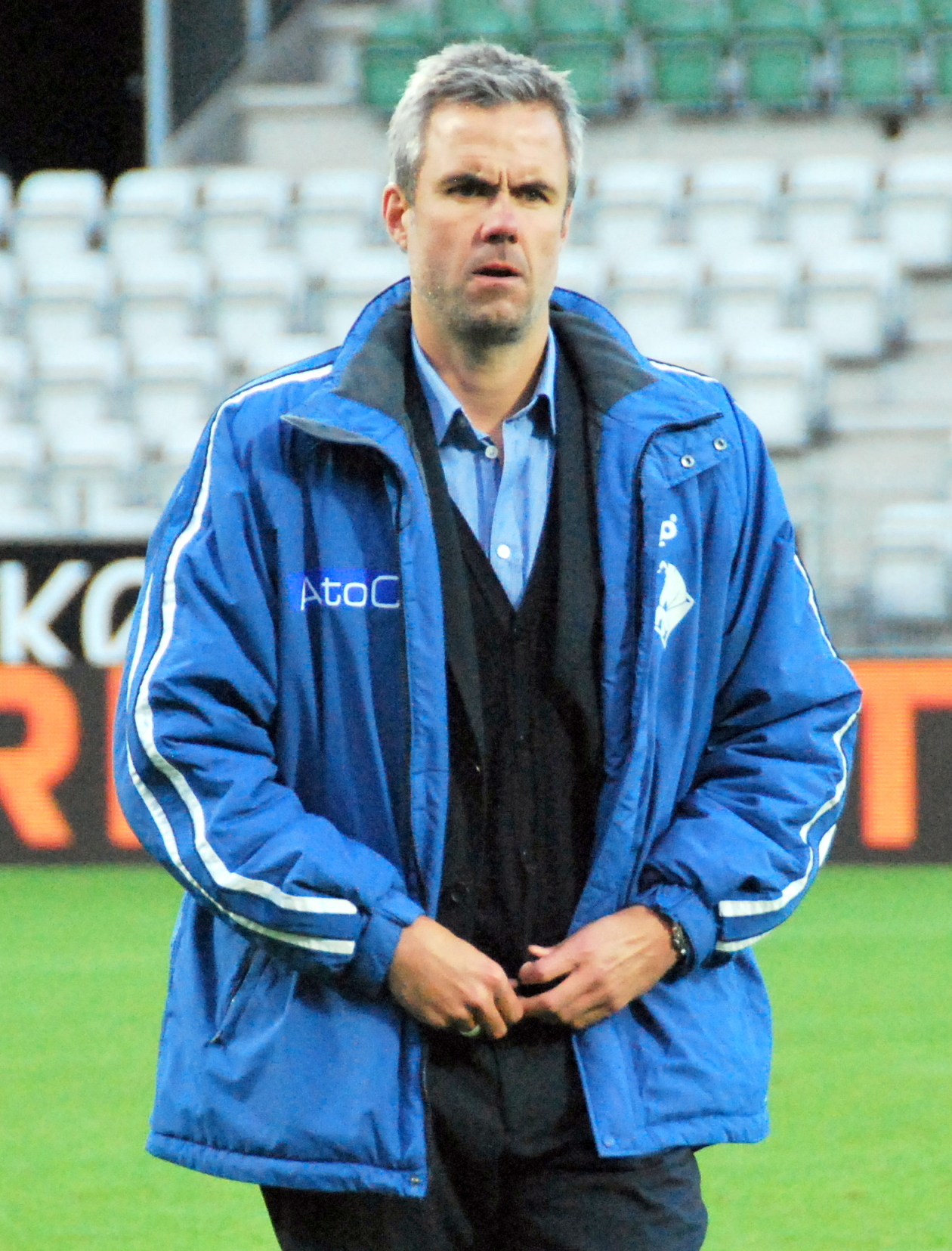
- Hemmingsen in 2012

Personal information
- Date of birth: 2 October 1967 (age 59)
- Place of birth: Denmark
- Height: 1.90 m (6 ft 3 in)
- Position: Defender

Senior career*
Years	Team	Apps	(Gls)
1984–1986	Brændekilde Bellinge		
1987	Assens		
1988–1993	B 1909		
1992–2005	OB	303	(22)

International career
1997	Denmark	3	(0)

Managerial career
- 2007: OB (caretaker)
- 2009–2011: SønderjyskE
- 2011–2012: Randers
- 2015: Vestsjælland
- 2017–2019: Næstved
- 2021: OB (caretaker)
- 2022: Fremad Amager
- * Club domestic league appearances and goals

Michael Hemmingsen (born 2 October 1967) is a Danish professional football manager and former footballer who most recently was the head coach of Danish 1st Division club Fremad Amager.

== Career ==
He was formerly the interim manager at Odense BK after Bruce Rioch left the club in March 2007, and the manager of SønderjyskE, Randers, Vestsjælland, and Næstved BK. He played the most of his career in OB as well. He is the older brother of former Denmark international Carsten Hemmingsen.

On 28 June 2022, Fremad Amager appointed Hemmingsen as head coach, effective from 17 July 2022, replacing Peter Løvenkrands. He was sacked in December 2022 with the club placed in 9th place.

=== Managerial Statistics ===
Managerial record by team and tenure
Team	From	To	Record				
Team	From	To	P	W	D	L	Win %
OB	March 2007	June 2007	1	1	0	0	100.0
SønderjyskE	July 2009	September 2009	9	3	2	4	33.3
SønderjyskE	January 2010	June 2011	49	16	10	23	32.7
Randers	July 2011	July 2012	28	16	4	8	57.1
Vestsjælland	September 2015	December 2015	13	2	4	7	15.4
Næstved	March 2017	June 2019	82	40	22	20	48.8
OB	March 2021	June 2021	11	5	3	3	45.5
Fremad Amager	June 2022	December 2022	21	8	2	11	38.1
Total			214	91	47	76	42.5

== Honours ==
=== Player ===
OB

- Danish Cup: 2001–02

=== Manager ===
OB

- Danish Cup: 2006–07
