= Kayhan Kaynak =

Turkish footballer (1960–1994)

Personal information
- Date of birth: 14 October 1960
- Place of birth: Adana, Turkey
- Date of death: 9 January 1994 (aged 33)
- Place of death: Karataş, Turkey
- Position: Forward

Youth career
- Ceyhanspor

Senior career*
Years	Team	Apps	(Gls)
1976–1978	Ceyhanspor		
1979–1986	Adanaspor	162	(56)
1986–1988	Fenerbahçe	61	(6)
1988–1991	Konyaspor	52	(15)
1991–1992	Eskişehirspor	17	(3)
1992–1993	Aydınspor	9	(1)
1993–1994	Adana Demirspor	26	(17)

International career
1978	Turkey U18	1	(0)
1982	Turkey U21	2	(0)
1987	Turkey	3	(1)
1987	Turkey Olympic	2	(0)
- * Club domestic league appearances and goals

Kayhan Kaynak (born 14 October 1960 – 9 January 1994) was a Turkish footballer best known for his stint in the Süper Lig with Adanaspor. A forward, Kayhan was a prolific goalscorer in Adanaspor, and transferred to Fenerbahçe where he had some successful seasons. After falling out with management, Kayhan joined Konyaspor, scoring 28 goals in 68 games, becoming the first superstar for the team.

== Personal life and death ==
Kayhan was born in to a large family of eight children. His brothers Orhan, Reşit, İrfan, İlhan and Ayhan were all professional footballers.

He died on 9 January 1994 of a heart attack, the same condition that killed his brothers Reşit and İrfan. He died during training for Adana Demirspor. After his death, a stadium was named after him in Adana.
