= Jesper Hjorth =

Danish footballer (born 1975)

Personal information
- Full name: Jesper Hjorth
- Date of birth: April 3, 1975 (age 51)
- Place of birth: Odense, Denmark
- Height: 1.83 m (6 ft 0 in)
- Position: Striker

Senior career*
Years	Team	Apps	(Gls)
1994–1999	Odense BK	61	(9)
1999	Herning Fremad		
1999–2001	Darlington	45	(6)
2001–2003	B1909		

International career
1992–1993	Denmark U19	6	(1)
1995–1996	Denmark U21	10	(1)
- * Club domestic league appearances and goals

Jesper Hjorth (born April 3, 1975) is a Danish former professional association footballer, who predominantly played in the striker position. He played 10 games and scored one goal for the Denmark under-21 national team.

Born in Odense, Hjorth started his senior career at Odense BK in the Danish Superliga championship, making his league debut in November 1994. The highlight of his career came in December 1994, at the age of just 19. In the 1994-95 UEFA Cup, Hjorth played at the Santiago Bernabéu stadium against Real Madrid to help Odense BK knock Real Madrid out of the tournament. He also scored against Madrid in the first leg at home. Having scored nine goals in 61 league games, Hjorth left Odense BK in January 1999, and joined Herning Fremad in the Danish 1st Division.

In November 1999, Hjorth moved abroad to play for English team Darlington in the Football League Two tournament. Having scored 6 goals in 45 first team appearances for Darlington, Hjorth moved back to Danish football to play for B1909 in June 2001. In July 2003, Hjorth went on to play amateur football in Næsby.
