= Peter Hedman =

Swedish footballer (born 1966)

Personal information
- Full name: Peter Johannes Hedman
- Date of birth: 18 September 1966 (age 60)
- Position: Forward

Youth career
- –1983: Löftadalens IF

Senior career*
Years	Team	Apps	(Gls)
1984–1985	Åsa IF		
1986–1987	IFK Göteborg		
1988–1989	Lillestrøm	32	(3)
1990–1993	Örgryte IS		
1994–1995	Lillestrøm	33	(9)
1996–1997	IK Oddevold		
1998	GAIS		
1999	Åsa IF		

International career
1984	Sweden U17	7	(2)
- * Club domestic league appearances and goals

Peter Johannes Hedman (born 18 September 1966) is a Swedish retired forward and winger.

== Career ==
Hedman started his senior career in Åsa IF and moved to IFK Göteborg in 1986. He did not break through in the first team, though he played once in the 1986-87 UEFA Cup which IFK eventually won. He was also capped as a Swedish youth international.

After the 1987 season he moved to Lillestrøm SK in Norway, recommended by the team's new manager Owe Rundberg. In 1989, according to Tidningarnas Telegrambyrå Hedman was one of 22 Swedish footballers who played abroad. Lillestrøm would field Swedish players continuously from 1987 through 2006.

Lillestrøm had acquired three new forwards in 1988, with Stein Amundsen and Jan Åge Fjørtoft competing for one of the forward positions, whereas Hedman was usually preferred alongside one of them due to his pace. After Lillestrøm beat Strømmen in the season opener on May Day, Hedman was immediately noticed as one of the fastest players in the league. Wrote Ola Bernhus for Dagbladet; "A gasp arose from the 8,000 spectators as Peter Hedman commenced his first sprint, it was as if the Strømmen players ran in reverse". Lillestrøm's director of sports claimed that Hedman and his compatriot Dennis Schiller were "the best purchases of all time" in Lillestrøm. VG also praised Hedman's qualities and named him man of the match against Sogndal.

Lillestrøm went on to become league champions in 1989, but Hedman only played half of the games in 1989. He picked up a knee injury against Vålerengen in July. After the 1989 season, Hedman went back to Göteborg and Örgryte IS to heal.

As Hedman was bought back from Örgryte IS to Lillestrøm in 1994, VG touted him as one of the best picks in the new fantasy football game Drømmeligaen. VG anticipated that Hedman would be a threat as a forward or winger. After a goalless start to the 1994 Eliteserien, where Hedman played winger, he was placed as a striker against Sogndal in the 16th of May game. Hedman scored double as well as delivering one assist.

As Lillestrøm entered the 1994–95 UEFA Cup, they faced Shakhtar Donetsk in the preliminary round. Already after 1 minute and 15 seconds, Hedman scored the first goal in what would be a 4–1 routing at home. When Lillestrøm were eliminated by Girondins de Bordeaux in the next round, Hedman missed two major goalscoring opportunities.

The 1994 season saw Lillestrøm become runners-up in the league, with Hedman adding a silver medal to his previous silver and gold from the 1980s. Entering the 1995–96 UEFA Cup, Lillestrøm were knocked out by Brøndby in the first round. After the 1995 season, Hedman's contract was not renewed. Odds BK expressed their interest in the player. Eventually, Hedman went back to Västra Götaland and newly promoted Allsvenskan club IK Oddevold. As the transfer was somewhat stalled, the Bosman rule was established in December 1995, which granted Hedman a free transfer. Lillestrøm claimed that "Hedman signed for Oddevold before the Bosman conviction fell", and thus wanted money.

Oddevold contested the 1996 Allsvenskan and the 1997 Division 1, ending last in both leagues. As Peter Hedman scored against Stenungsund on 28 September 1997, it would be Oddevold's last goal on the second Swedish tier until the club finally returned in 2024. Upon joining GAIS in 1998, Hedman became the third player to feature for Gothenburg rivals IFK, Örgryte and GAIS. The other two were Gunnar Gren and Bengt Andersson. Hedman left GAIS for Åsa IF in 1999 before retiring.

== Personal life ==
Hedman met his future wife when he played for Örgryte and she worked in the club office. They had a daughter in 1994. He settled in Förlanda near Fjärås and worked in insurance while his wife ran a stable of horses.

Hedman coached his son's successive children's teams in Löftadalens IF, then Frillesås and Åsa IF. In 2015 and 2016, Hedman coached and led the senior team of Åsa IF to promotions in the lower leagues.
