= Ayhan Kaynak =

Turkish footballer

Personal information
- Date of birth: 4 March 1967 (age 59)
- Place of birth: Adana, Turkey
- Position: Midfielder

Senior career*
Years	Team	Apps	(Gls)
1988–1989	Adana Demirspor	6	(0)
1990–1991	Adana Gençlerbirliği	31	(0)
1991–1992	Alanyaspor	10	(1)
1992–1994	Bucaspor	41	(9)
1994–1995	Sarıyer S.K.		(2)
1995–1996	Kartal S.K.	7	(2)
1996	Çorluspor	8	(0)
- * Club domestic league appearances and goals

Ayhan Kaynak (born 4 March 1967) is a Turkish former professional footballer who played as a midfielder, spending one season in the Süper Lig with Adana Demirspor.

== Career ==
Kaynak made his professional debut with Adana Demirspor in a 2–1 Süper Lig win over Karşıyaka S.K. on 11 June 1989. After his debut season with Adana Demirspor, he spent the rest of his career in the lower divisions in Turkey.

== Personal life ==
Kaynak was born in to a large family of eight children. His brothers Orhan, Reşit, İrfan, Kayhan and İlhan were all professional footballers.
