= Andrzej Orzeszek =

Polish footballer

Personal information
- Date of birth: 21 February 1967 (age 59)
- Place of birth: Zabrze, Poland
- Height: 1.81 m (5 ft 11 in)
- Position: Midfielder

Youth career
- 1978–1984: Bobrek Karb Bytom

Senior career*
Years	Team	Apps	(Gls)
1985–1989	Górnik Zabrze	37	(2)
1989–1991	Szombierki Bytom	65	(16)
1991–1992	Górnik Zabrze	31	(4)
1992–1993	Szombierki Bytom	33	(12)
1993–1998	Górnik Zabrze	113	(12)
1998–1999	Aluminium Konin	21	(3)
1999–2000	KS Myszków	12	(0)
2000	Hutnik Kraków		
2001	Górnik Zabrze	3	(0)
2001	Społem Zabrze		
2003	Czarni Pyskowice		
2005–2007	Sparta Lubliniec		

Managerial career
- 2002–2003: Przyszłość Ciochowice
- 2003–2004: Koszarawa Żywiec
- 2005: Szczakowianka Jaworzno (caretaker)
- 2005–2007: Sparta Lubliniec (player-manager)
- 2007: Zagłębie Sosnowiec (caretaker)
- 2007–2008: Zagłębie Sosnowiec
- 2008: Stal Rzeszów
- 2009–2010: Hetman Zamość
- 2010: Stal Poniatowa
- 2010: Górnik Zabrze (ME)
- 2013–2015: Przyszłość Ciochowice
- 2015: Górnik Zabrze II
- 2016: Przyszłość Ciochowice
- 2016–2017: Polonia Bytom
- 2017–2018: Warta Zawiercie
- 2018: MKS Kluczbork
- 2019: Polonia Głubczyce
- * Club domestic league appearances and goals

Andrzej Orzeszek (born 21 February 1967) is a Polish professional football manager and former player who played as a midfielder.

== Honours ==
Górnik Zabrze

- Ekstraklasa: 1985–86, 1986–87, 1987–88
