= Carsten Hemmingsen =

Danish football coach and former player (born 1970)

Personal information
- Full name: Carsten Hemmingsen
- Date of birth: 18 December 1970 (age 55)
- Place of birth: Odense, Denmark
- Height: 1.85 m (6 ft 1 in)
- Position: Midfielder

Team information
- Current team: Slagelse B&I (Head coach)

Youth career
- Brændekilde Bellinge

Senior career*
Years	Team	Apps	(Gls)
- B 1913
1994–1996	OB	55	(6)
1996–2000	Copenhagen	100	(9)
2000–2004	OB	95	(6)
2004	→ AB (loan)	10	(0)
2004–2005	Vejle	17	(3)
2005	AGF	5	(0)
Total		282	(24)

International career
1995	Denmark	1	(0)

Managerial career
- 2006–2010: B1909 (player-coach)
- 2011–2013: Aarup BK
- 2014–2015: FC Svendborg
- 2015: Middelfart G&BK
- 2015–2016: BK Marienlyst (Director of football)
- 2016–2018: BK Marienlyst
- 2020–2021: Odder IGF
- 2022–: Slagelse B&I
Medal record
Men's football
Representing Denmark
FIFA Confederations Cup
Winner	1995 Saudi Arabia
- * Club domestic league appearances and goals

Carsten Hemmingsen (born 18 December 1970) is a Danish former professional football player who played as a midfielder. He is the current head coach of the Danish club Slagelse B&I. He is the younger brother of Michael Hemmingsen.

In 1995, he made one appearance for the Denmark national football team.

== Honours ==
FC Copenhagen

- Danish Cup: 1996–97

OB

- Danish Cup: 2001–02
