= Christian Karlsson (footballer) =

Swedish footballer (born 1969)

Personal information
- Full name: Hans Christian Enehov Karlsson
- Date of birth: 20 September 1969 (age 57)
- Place of birth: Vellinge, Sweden
- Position: Defender

Youth career
- Vellinge IF

Senior career*
Years	Team	Apps	(Gls)
1985–1988	Vellinge IF		
1989–1995	Trelleborgs FF		
1996–1997	Malmö FF	35	(2)
1998–2000	IFK Göteborg	24	(0)
2000–2002	Esbjerg fB	53	(7)
2002–2004	AB	42	(1)
2004	Vellinge IF		

International career
1991	Sweden	3	(0)
1996	Sweden B	1	(0)
1996–1997	Sweden	8	(0)
- * Club domestic league appearances and goals

Hans Christian Enehov Karlsson (born 20 September 1969) is a Swedish former professional footballer who played as a defender. He is best remembered for representing Trelleborgs FF, Malmö FF, IFK Göteborg, Esbjerg fB, and AB during a career that spanned between 1985 and 2004. A full international between 1996 and 1997, he won eight caps for the Sweden national team.

== Career statistics ==
=== International ===
Appearances and goals by national team and year
National team	Year	Apps	Goals
Sweden	1996	3	0
Sweden	1997	5	0
Total		8	0
