= Fănel Țîră =

Romanian footballer

Personal information
- Date of birth: 8 June 1966 (age 60)
- Place of birth: Calafat, Romania
- Height: 1.78 m (5 ft 10 in)
- Position: Midfielder

Youth career
- 1979–1982: CSȘ Rovine Craiova

Senior career*
Years	Team	Apps	(Gls)
1982–1984	CSM Drobeta-Turnu Severin		
1984–1988	Rapid București	94	(18)
1988–1989	Victoria București	46	(7)
1990–1995	Rapid București (Note: The statistics for the 1989–90 Divizia B season are unavailable.)	107	(16)
1995–1996	Jiul Petroșani	17	(3)
1996–1998	Rocar București	23	(4)
1999	Juventus București		
Total		287	(48)

Managerial career
- 1999: Juventus București (player/coach)
- 2006–2008: Kuwait (assistant)
- 2008–2009: Al-Salmiya (assistant)
- 2017–2023: Voluntari U19
- 2023–2024: CSM Slatina (assistant)
- * Club domestic league appearances and goals

Fănel Țîră (born 8 June 1966) is a Romanian former footballer and manager. He is the father of Cătălin Țîră.

== Honours ==
Drobeta-Turnu Severin

- Divizia C: 1983–84

Rapid București

- Divizia B: 1989–90
- Cupa României runner-up: 1994–95

Jiul Petroșani

- Divizia B: 1995–96
