= Dražen Podunavac =

Serbian footballer (born 1969)

Personal information
- Full name: Dražen Podunavac
- Date of birth: 30 April 1969 (age 57)
- Place of birth: SFR Yugoslavia
- Position: Defender

Senior career*
Years	Team	Apps	(Gls)
1989–1991	Osijek	8	(0)
1991–1992	Spartak Subotica	17	(0)
1992–1995	OFK Beograd	80	(4)
1994	→ FH (loan)	16	(1)
1995–1996	Red Star Belgrade	20	(1)
1996	Daewoo Royals	15	(0)
1997–1998	Rad	32	(0)
1998–1999	ILTEX Lykoi		
1999	OFK Beograd	8	(0)
1999–2001	Chemnitzer FC	43	(0)
- * Club domestic league appearances and goals

Dražen Podunavac (Serbian Cyrillic: Дражен Подунавац; born 30 April 1969) is a Serbian retired footballer.

== Career ==
He played with NK Osijek in the Yugoslav First League, FK Spartak Subotica, Red Star Belgrade, FK Rad and OFK Beograd in the First League of FR Yugoslavia, with Fimleikafélag Hafnarfjarðar in Iceland with Pusan Daewoo Royals in the K-League. Greek side ILTEX Lykoi and with Chemnitzer FC in the German 2. Bundesliga. He arrived to Chemnitzer in November 1999. He played with OFK the first half of the 1999–2000 First League of FR Yugoslavia.

He played with Red Star Belgrade in the 1995–96 season.

After retiring, he was the sporting director of OFK Beograd.
