= Morten Nielsen (footballer, born 1971) =

Danish footballer

Personal information
- Date of birth: 14 April 1971 (age 55)
- Place of birth: Kalundborg
- Position: Defender

Senior career*
Years	Team	Apps	(Gls)
1991–1994	Lyngby FC		
1994–1997	FC København		
1998–2000	RC Strasbourg		
2000–2002	EA Guingamp		
2004–2007	Holbæk B&I		
- * Club domestic league appearances and goals

Morten Nielsen (born 14 April 1971) is a Danish retired football defender.

== Honours ==
Copenhagen

- Danish Cup: 1994–95
- Danish Super Cup: 1995
