= Mikael Rasmusson =

Swedish footballer

Personal information
- Date of birth: 6 July 1967 (age 59)
- Position: Midfielder

Senior career*
Years	Team	Apps	(Gls)
1985–1986	IFK Malmö		
1988–1989	Kirseberg IF		
1990–1995	Trelleborgs FF		
- * Club domestic league appearances and goals

Mikael Rasmusson (born 6 July 1967) is a Swedish retired football midfielder.
