= Fredrik Sandell =

Swedish footballer

Personal information
- Date of birth: 24 December 1972 (age 53)
- Position: Forward

Senior career*
Years	Team	Apps	(Gls)
1989–1998	Trelleborgs FF		
- * Club domestic league appearances and goals

Fredrik Sandell (born 24 December 1972) is a Swedish retired football striker.
