= Marek Szemoński =

Polish footballer

Personal information
- Date of birth: 14 July 1976 (age 50)
- Place of birth: Zabrze, Poland
- Height: 1.78 m (5 ft 10 in)
- Position: Forward

Senior career*
Years	Team	Apps	(Gls)
1993–1997	Górnik Zabrze	99	(22)
1997–1988	Widzew Łódź	32	(5)
1999–2000	Lech Poznań	10	(1)
2000–2001	Górnik Zabrze	19	(2)
2001	Widzew Łódź	7	(1)
2002	Szczakowianka Jaworzno		
2003	Przyszłość Ciochowice		
2004	Polonia Bytom		
2004–2005	Tempo Paniówki		
2005–2006	Tęcza Wielowieś		
- * Club domestic league appearances and goals

Marek Szemoński (born 14 July 1976) is a Polish former professional footballer who played as a forward.
