= Mihály Mracskó =

Hungarian footballer

Personal information
- Date of birth: 13 June 1968 (age 58)
- Place of birth: Békéscsaba
- Position: Defender

Senior career*
Years	Team	Apps	(Gls)
1987–1996	Békéscsabai 1912 Előre		
1996–1998	Győri ETO FC		
1999	Beijing Guoan		
1999	Yunnan Hongta		
2000–2002	Győri ETO FC		
2003	Kispesti Honvéd FC		
2003–2004	Gyirmót SE		

International career
1993–1997	Hungary	25	(0)
- * Club domestic league appearances and goals

Mihály Mracskó (born 13 June 1968) is a retired Hungarian football defender.
