= Andrzej Nikodem =

Polish footballer

Personal information
- Date of birth: 16 November 1968 (age 57)
- Height: 1.87 m (6 ft 2 in)
- Position: Defender

Senior career*
Years	Team	Apps	(Gls)
1990–1993	CKS Czeladź		
1994–1996	GKS Katowice	31	(0)
1996–1997	Górnik Lędziny		
1997–1999	CKS Czeladź		
1999–2002	Włókniarz Kietrz		
2002–2003	Carbo Gliwice		
2003	Unia Skierniewice		
2004	MKS Myszków		
2004	Milenium Wojkowice		
2012	CKS Czeladź		
- * Club domestic league appearances and goals

Andrzej Nikodem (born 16 November 1968) is a Polish former professional footballer who played as a defender.

== Honours ==
GKS Katowice

- Polish Super Cup: 1995
