= Demetris Assiotis =

Cypriot footballer (born 1971)

Personal information
- Full name: Demetris Assiotis
- Date of birth: March 31, 1971 (age 55)
- Place of birth: Nicosia, Cyprus
- Position: Midfielder

Senior career*
Years	Team	Apps	(Gls)
1987–1992	Olympiakos Nicosia	83	(11)
1992–1997	Anorthosis Famagusta	105	(19)
1997–1998	Ethnikos Achna	10	(0)
1998–2002	Olympiakos Nicosia	96	(18)
2003	Nea Salamina	5	(0)
2004–2005	Aris Limassol	17	(0)
Total		316	(48)

International career
1991–2000	Cyprus	6	(0)
- * Club domestic league appearances and goals

Demetris Assiotis (Greek: Δημήτρης Ασσιώτης; born March 31, 1971) is a Cypriot former international football midfielder.

He started and ended his career with Olympiakos Nicosia. He also played for Ethnikos Achna and Anorthosis Famagusta.
