= Soner Boz =

Turkish footballer

Personal information
- Date of birth: 12 January 1968 (age 58)
- Position: Forward

Senior career*
Years	Team	Apps	(Gls)
1987–1996	Trabzonspor		
1996–2001	Kocaelispor		
2001–2002	Siirt Jetpa		
- * Club domestic league appearances and goals

Soner Boz (born 12 January 1968) is a retired Turkish football striker.

While at Kocaelispor he scored in the first leg of the 1997 Turkish Cup Final against his former club Trabzonspor, which helped his team to a 2-1 aggregate win.

== Honours ==
=== Club ===
Trabzonspor

- Turkish Cup: 1991–92, 1994–95
- Turkish Super Cup: 1995

Kocaelispor

- Turkish Cup: 1996–97
