= Soma Linyitspor =

Turkish football club

Somaspor Linyitspor
- Full name: Türkiye Kömür İşletmeleri Soma Linyit Spor Kulübü
- Founded: 1984; 41 years ago as Ege Linyitspor
- Ground: Soma Linyit Stadium
- Chairman: Mustafa Gülşen
- League: Manisa Amateur League
Home colours	Away colours

Türkiye Kömür İşletmeleri Soma Linyit Spor Kulübü, shortly TKİ Soma Linyitspor, colloquially known as Soma Linyitspor, is a Turkish football club located in Manisa. The world "linyit" means brown coal in Turkish language, which commemorates coal mining industry in city of Manisa. The club enjoyed their best performances while competing at TFF Second League, then-second tier league competition in Turkish football league system.

Since 2001, the club competes at Manisa Amateur League.

== History ==
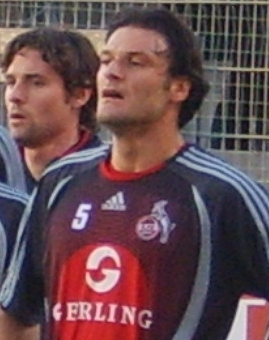
Former Turkish international (90 caps, 4 goals) and 2002 World Cup bronze medalist Alpay Özalan started his professional career at Soma Linyitspor in 1991–92 season

The club was founded in 1984 as Ege Linyitspor and its name was altered in 1989 as Soma Linyitspor. Beating Erzincanspor by 1–0 final score at Samsun 19 Mayıs Stadium at 1st Play-off Group, the team promoted to TFF Second League on 25 May 1994.

== Team records ==
=== League affiliation ===
- TFF Second League: (Note: TFF Second League was the second highest level at Turkish football league system (3 tier of professional football) until the formation of Süper Lig in 2001.) 1994–1999
- TFF Third League: (Note: TFF Third League was the third highest level at Turkish football league system (3 tier of professional football) until the formation of Süper Lig in 2001.) 1990–1994, 1999–2001
- Turkish Regional Amateur League: 1984–1990, 2001–present

== Honours ==
- TFF Third League
  - Play-off Winner: 1993–94
