= Michael Spiteri =

Maltese footballer

Personal information
- Date of birth: 25 February 1969 (age 57)
- Place of birth: Fgura, Malta
- Position: Defender

Senior career*
Years	Team	Apps	(Gls)
1988–1999	Hibernians	157	(12)
1999–2003	Birkirkara	58	(6)
Total		215	(28)

International career
1993–2001	Malta	24	(1)
- * Club domestic league appearances and goals

Michael Spiteri (born 25 February 1969) is a Maltese retired football defender.

== International career ==
Spiteri made his debut for Malta in a November 1993 friendly match against Egypt and earned a total of 24 caps, scoring 1 goal. His final international was a November 2001 friendly against Canada.

== Honours ==
Hibernians

- Maltese Premier League: 1994, 1995
- Maltese FA Trophy: 1998

Birkirkara

- Maltese Premier League: 2000
