= János Szarvas =

Hungarian footballer

Personal information
- Date of birth: 12 September 1965 (age 61)
- Place of birth: Békéscsaba
- Position: Forward

Senior career*
Years	Team	Apps	(Gls)
1984–1988	Békéscsabai Elõre		
1990–1992	Szarvasi FC		
1992–1996	Békéscsabai Elõre		
1996–1999	Győri ETO FC		
2000	Pápai ELC		
- * Club domestic league appearances and goals

János Szarvas (born 12 September 1965) is a retired Hungarian football striker.
