= Krzysztof Walczak =

Polish footballer

Personal information
- Date of birth: 4 February 1963 (age 63)
- Place of birth: Świętochłowice, Poland
- Height: 1.80 m (5 ft 11 in)
- Position: Forward

Senior career*
Years	Team	Apps	(Gls)
1980–1983	Ruch Chorzów	8	(0)
1983–1984	Polonia Bytom		
1984–1985	Śląsk Wrocław	4	(0)
1985–1988	Polonia Bytom		
1988–1992	GKS Katowice	108	(33)
1992–1994	Nea Salamina	45	(16)
1994–1995	GKS Katowice	32	(7)
1996	Polonia Bytom		
1996–1997	Szombierki Bytom		
1997–1999	Bobrek Karb Bytom		

International career
- Poland U18
Medal record
Men's football
Representing Poland
UEFA European Under-18 Championship
Runner-up	1981 West Germany
- * Club domestic league appearances and goals

Krzysztof Walczak (born 4 February 1963) is a Polish former professional footballer who played as a forward. Besides Poland, he played in Cyprus.

== Honours ==
GKS Katowice

- Polish Cup: 1990–91
- Polish Super Cup: 1991, 1995

Poland U18

- UEFA European Under-18 Championship runner-up: 1981
