= Jiří Vávra =

Czech footballer

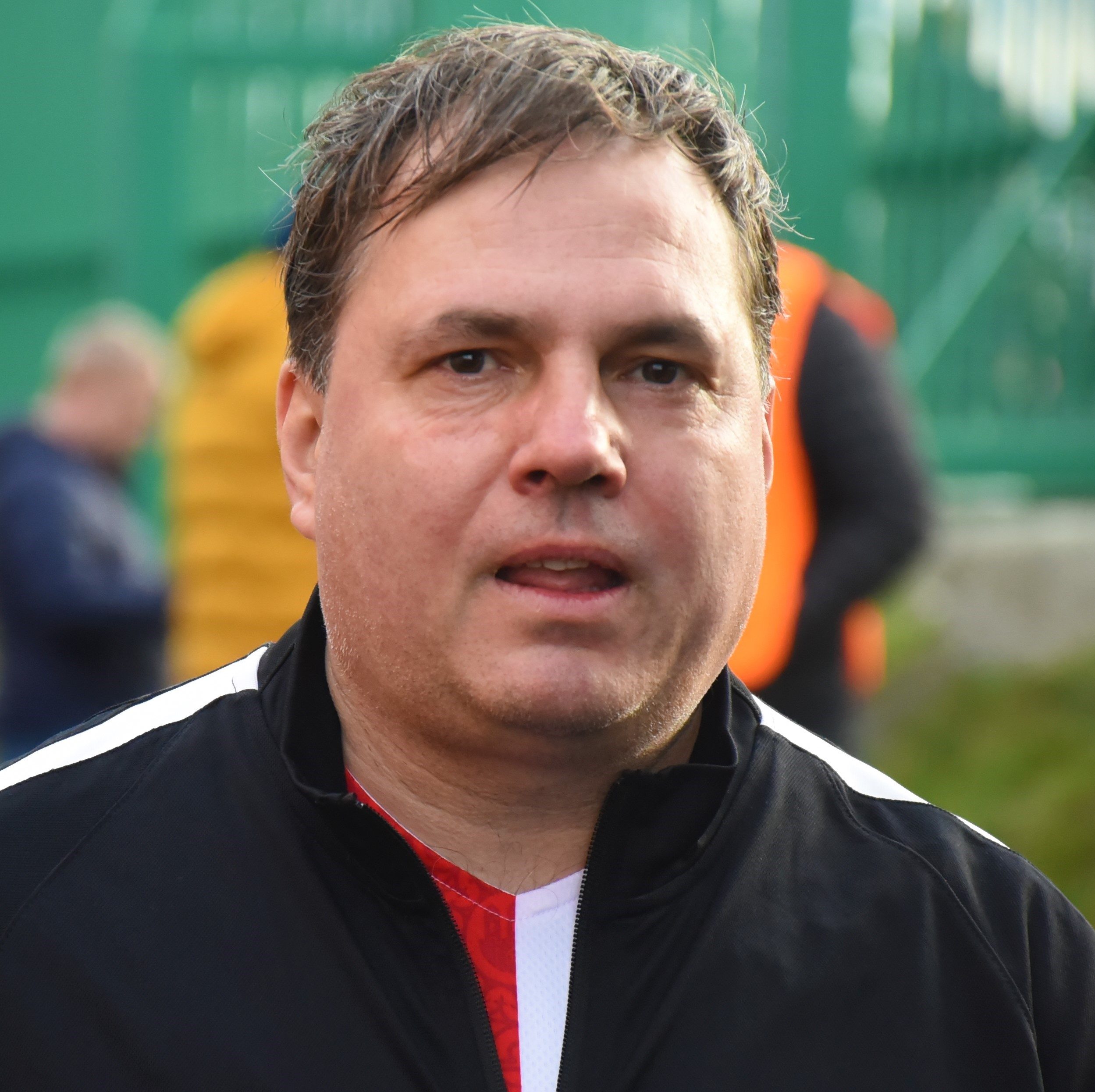
- Vávra in 2022

Personal information
- Date of birth: 6 March 1975 (age 51)
- Place of birth: Czechoslovakia
- Position: Midfielder

Youth career
- 1992–1993: Slovan Liberec

Senior career*
Years	Team	Apps	(Gls)
1993–1994	Dukla Prague	21	(2)
1994–1997	Slavia Prague	80	(9)
1998	Maccabi Haifa	16	(0)
1998–2000	FK Jablonec	54	(1)
2001	Příbram	5	(0)
2001–2003	Viktoria Žižkov	13	(0)

International career
1993–1997	Czech Republic U21	16	(2)
1995	Czech Republic	1	(0)
Medal record
SK Slavia Prague
Winner	Gambrinus liga	1995–96
- * Club domestic league appearances and goals

Jiří Vávra (born 6 March 1975) is a Czech former football player. He played for the Czech Republic in 1995. He also made 174 appearances in the top division of Czech football.
