= Krzysztof Maciejewski (politician) =

Polish politician (born 1953)

member of Sejm 2005-2007
- In office 25 September 2005 – ?

Personal details
- Born: 17 April 1953 (age 72)
- Party: Law and Justice

Krzysztof Maciejewski (born 17 April 1953 in Pabianice) is a Polish politician. He was elected to the Sejm on 25 September 2005, getting 6,597 votes in 10 Piotrków Trybunalski district as a candidate from the Law and Justice list.

== See also ==
- Members of Polish Sejm 2005-2007
