= Jörgen Eriksson =

Swedish footballer (born 1973)

Personal information
- Date of birth: 7 January 1973 (age 53)
- Position: Defender

Youth career
- Vellinge IF

Senior career*
| Years | Team | Apps | (Gls) |
| 1991–2002 | Trelleborgs FF | | |

International career
| 1994–1995 | Sweden U21 | 9 | (0) |
- * Club domestic league appearances and goals

Jörgen "George" Eriksson (born 7 January 1973) is a Swedish former football defender. He played 265 games for Trelleborgs FF between 1991 and 2002. A youth international for Sweden between 1994 and 1995, he appeared nine times for the Sweden U21 team.
