= Joachim Karlsson =

Swedish footballer

Personal information
- Date of birth: 13 January 1969 (age 57)
- Position: Forward

Senior career*
Years	Team	Apps	(Gls)
1988–1989	Örgryte IS		
1991–1993	IFK Luleå		
1994–1996	Trelleborgs FF		
1996–1998	AO Kalamata		
1998–2002	Örgryte IS		
- * Club domestic league appearances and goals

Joachim Karlsson (born 13 January 1969) is a Swedish retired football striker.
