= Orhan Kaynak =

Turkish footballer (1970–2026)

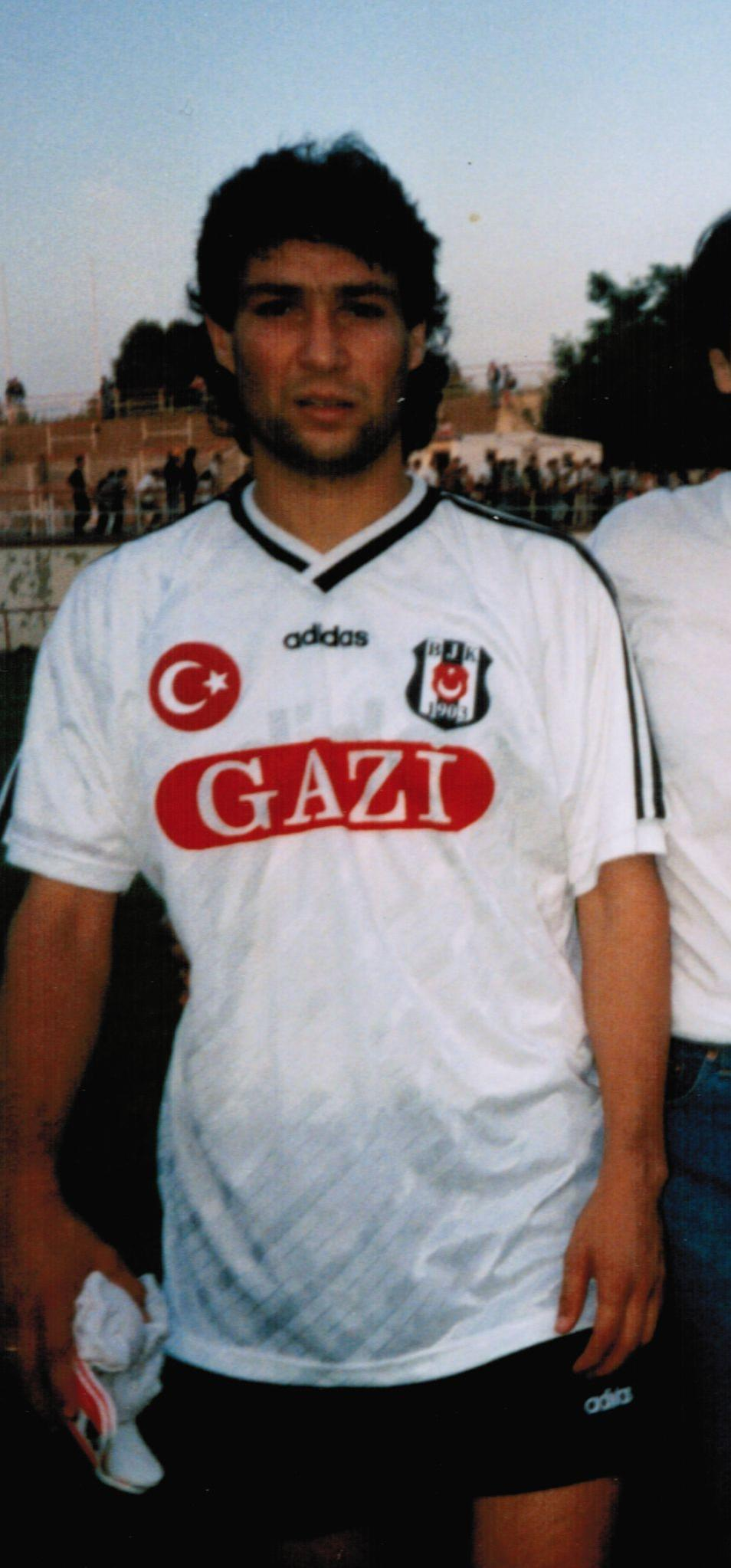

Personal information
- Date of birth: 1 March 1970
- Place of birth: Adana, Turkey
- Date of death: 10 March 2026 (aged 56)
- Place of death: Trabzon, Turkey
- Height: 1.81 m (5 ft 11 in)
- Position: Forward

Youth career
- 1982–1987: Adanaspor

Senior career*
Years	Team	Apps	(Gls)
1987–1991	Adanaspor	89	(27)
1991–1993	Samsunspor	61	(23)
1993–1995	Trabzonspor	86	(41)
1995–1997	Beşiktaş	52	(12)
1997–2001	Kocaelispor	80	(24)
2001	Xanthi	0	(0)
2001	İstanbul Başakşehir	2	(0)
2001–2003	Kayseri Erciyesspor	34	(19)
2003–2005	Akçaabat Sebatspor	63	(24)
2005–2006	Kocaelispor	24	(6)
2006–2007	Sarıyer	35	(14)

International career
1989–1990	Turkey U21	6	(1)

Managerial career
- 2008–2010: Eskişehirspor (assistant)
- 2010–2013: Sivasspor (assistant)
- 2013–2014: Çaykur Rizespor (assistant)
- 2014: Trabzonspor (assistant)
- 2014–2015: Sivasspor (assistant)
- 2017: Adana Demirspor (assistant)
- 2018: Sarıyer
- 2018–2019: Elazığspor
- 2019: Boluspor
- 2020: Elazığspor
- 2025–2026: Trabzonspor (assistant)
- * Club domestic league appearances and goals

Orhan Kaynak (1 March 1970 – 10 March 2026), also known as Küçük Orhan, was a Turkish football player and coach. A forward, he had stints in the Süper Lig with Adanaspor, Trabzonspor, and Kocaelispor.

== Playing career ==
Kaynak followed his brothers and graduated from the Adanaspor and joined the first team in the Süper Lig. He spent the rest of his career in the highest divisions of Turkey, with notable performances with Trabzonspor and Kocaelispor.

== Coaching career ==
On 2 March 2018, Kaynak was appointed the manager of Sarıyer. He won two games out of ten at Sarıyer.

On 12 June 2018, Kaynak was linked with a move to Elazığspor. Later in the month, he was officially announced as the club's new manager. After seven months, on 24 January 2019, Kaynak decided to resign from Elazığspor. The club was in a very bad economical condition and had a debt of 46 million Turkish lira, also with 12 players leaving the club.

A few days later, on 28 January 2019, Kaynak was announced as the new manager of Boluspor.

He was named as one of the assistant coaches when Fatih Tekke was announced as the new manager of Trabzonspor on 11 May 2025.

== Personal life and death ==
Kaynak was born in to a large family of eight children. His brothers Reşit, Kayhan, İrfan, İlhan and Ayhan were all professional footballers. He earned the nickname "Küçük Orhan" (meaning little Orhan), because Orhan Çıkırıkçı was in the same team at Trabzonspor.

Kaynak died of a heart attack in Trabzon, on 10 March 2026, at the age of 56.

== Honours ==
Adanaspor

- TFF First League: 1987-88

Samsunspor

- TFF First League: 1992-93

Trabzonspor

- Turkish Cup: 1994-95
- Turkish Super Cup: 1995

Beşiktaş

- TSYD Cup: 1996-97
