= Krzysztof Maciejewski (footballer) =

Polish footballer

Personal information
- Date of birth: 22 August 1964 (age 62)
- Height: 1.78 m (5 ft 10 in)
- Position: Defender

Senior career*
| Years | Team | Apps | (Gls) |
| 1988–1990 | Carbo Gliwice | | |
| 1990–1995 | GKS Katowice | 142 | (13) |
| 1996–1998 | Polonia Bytom | | |
| 1998–2002 | Bobrek Karb Bytom | | |

International career
| 1991–1994 | Poland | 5 | (0) |
- * Club domestic league appearances and goals

Krzysztof Maciejewski (born 22 August 1964) is a Polish former professional footballer who played as a defender.

== Honours ==
GKS Katowice

- Polish Cup: 1990–91, 1992–93
- Polish Super Cup: 1991
