= Aygün Taşkıran =

Turkish footballer (born 1974)

Personal information
- Date of birth: 22 April 1974 (age 52)
- Place of birth: Motluçan, Turkey
- Height: 1.75 m (5 ft 9 in)
- Position: Midfielder

Senior career*
Years	Team	Apps	(Gls)
1990–1992	Akhisar Belediyespor		
1992–1993	Manisaspor		
1993–2001	Fenerbahçe		
1997–1999	→ Sakaryaspor (loan)		
1999–2000	→ Çaykur Rizespor (loan)		
2000–2001	→ Karşıyaka (loan)		
2001–2002	Karşıyaka		
2002–2004	Manisaspor		
2004–2006	Bucaspor		
2007	Turgutluspor		
2008	Silivrispor		

Managerial career
- Manisaspor (youth)
- Menemenspor (assistant)
- Menemenspor
- * Club domestic league appearances and goals

Aygün Taşkıran (born 22 April 1974) is a retired Turkish football midfielder.

His main trophy in a long career in Fenerbahçe was winning the 1995–96 1.Lig. The contest was very close between Fenerbahçe and Trabzonspor. When Fenerbahçe played Trabzonspor away, Ali Haydar Şen arranged a bus ride for the team. The bus was attacked by stonepelters, with Aygün Taşkıran receiving a minor head injury. Fenerbahçe managed to use the upsetting episode as motivation to clinch the title, however.

He was a youth coach in Manisaspor until leaving in 2018. In 2022 he became manager of Menemenspor, being promoted from an assistant role.

== Personal life ==
In 2016, Aygün Taşkıran lost his daughter Yeren in a car accident. The car was driven by Aygün's father Yusuf.
