= Andreas Falkvard Hansen =

Faroese footballer (born 1966)

Personal information
- Date of birth: 18 November 1966 (age 59)
- Position: Defender

Senior career*
| Years | Team | Apps | (Gls) |
- Havnar Bóltfelag

International career
| 1995–1996 | Faroe Islands | 4 | (0) |
- * Club domestic league appearances and goals

Andreas Falkvard Hansen (born 18 November 1966) is a Faroese retired football defender.
