= Stephen Beatty =

Northern Irish footballer (born 1969)

Personal information
- Date of birth: 1 September 1969 (age 57)
- Place of birth: Carrickfergus, Northern Ireland
- Positions: Midfielder; defender

Youth career
- Carrick Rangers

Senior career*
Years	Team	Apps	(Gls)
1988–1989	Chelsea	0	(0)
1990	AGF Aarhus	8	(0)
1990–2001	Linfield	253	(29)
2001–2007	Coleraine		

International career
1990–1994	Northern Ireland U21	2	(0)
- * Club domestic league appearances and goals

Stephen Beatty (born 1 September 1969) is a Northern Irish former professional football midfielder who began his career playing for Carrick Rangers in Northern Ireland. In June 1988 he signed with English second level side Chelsea, that won promotion from the English Second Division that season, but Stephen Beatty failed to make an impact in the first team. With no chance of playing top-flight level with Chelsea the following season, he then signed with Danish top-flight side AGF Aarhus, but only got to play a few league games in 1990 before moving back to Northern Ireland, where he became Irish League Champion four times, playing for Linfield. He has been capped twice for the Northern Ireland under-21 national team. Stephen has recently been a coach for Irish League side Newry City FC. Stephen originates from Rathcoole, Newtownabbey, County Antrim.

== Honours ==
- Irish Football League: 4

Linfield 1992/93, 1993/94, 1999/00, 2000/01

- Irish Cup: 3

Linfield 1993/94, 1994/95 Coleraine 2002/03
