= Jens Christian Mosegaard Madsen =

Danish footballer (born 1972)

Jens Madsen
Personal information
- Full name: Jens Christian Mosegaard Madsen
- Date of birth: 20 April 1972 (age 54)
- Place of birth: Herning, Denmark
- Position: Defender

Senior career*
Years	Team	Apps	(Gls)
1987	Holstebro Boldklub		
1988–1991	Ikast FS		
1992–1995	OB	32	(3)
1995–2000	Vejle	100	(8)
2000–2001	AGF	9	(0)

International career
- Denmark
- * Club domestic league appearances and goals

Jens Christian Mosegaard Madsen (born 20 April 1972) is a Danish former professional footballer who played as a defender. He competed in the men's tournament at the 1992 Summer Olympics.
