= 1996 UEFA Intertoto Cup =

Tournament details
- Dates: 22 June 1996 – 20 August 1996
- Teams: 60

Final positions
- Champions: (Denmark) Silkeborg (France) Guingamp (Germany) Karlsruhe

Tournament statistics
- Matches played: 138
- Goals scored: 430 (3.12 per match)

The 1996 UEFA Intertoto Cup finals were won by Silkeborg, Guingamp, and Karlsruhe. All three teams advanced to the UEFA Cup. No English team took part in support of Tottenham Hotspur and Wimbledon initially getting banned by UEFA from European competition, after both fielded under-strength sides in the previous year's competition.

== Qualified teams ==
Qualified teams for 1996 UEFA Intertoto Cup
Entry round	Teams			
Group stage	Austria Vienna (5th)	(Austria) LASK (6th)	(Austria) Ried (7th)	(Belarus) Ataka-Aura Minsk (4th)
Group stage	(Belgium) Lierse (5th)	(Belgium) Standard Liège (6th)	(Belgium) Charleroi (7th)	(Bulgaria) CSKA Sofia (5th)
Group stage	(Bulgaria) Spartak Varna (6th)	(Croatia) Segesta (8th)	(Cyprus) Apollon Limassol (5th)	(Czech Republic) Kaučuk Opava (6th)
Group stage	(Denmark) AaB (5th)	(Denmark) Silkeborg (6th)	(Denmark) Copenhagen (7th)	(Estonia) Narva Trans (5th)
Group stage	(Faroe Islands) B68 Toftir (3rd)	(Finland) Jaro (5th)	(France) Nantes (7th)	(France) Rennes (8th)
Group stage	(France) Strasbourg (9th)	(France) Guingamp (10th)	(Georgia (country)) Kolkheti Poti (3rd)	(Germany) Karlsruhe (7th)
Group stage	(Germany) 1860 Munich (8th)	(Germany) Werder Bremen (9th)	(Germany) Stuttgart (10th)	(Hungary) Vasas (7th)
Group stage	(Iceland) Keflavík (4th)	(Republic of Ireland) Sligo Rovers (3rd)	(Israel) Hapoel Haifa (4th)	(Israel) Hapoel Tel Aviv (5th)
Group stage	(Latvia) Daugava (5th)	(Lithuania) Kaunas (4th)	(Malta) Hibernians (4th)	(Netherlands) Heerenveen (7th)
Group stage	(Netherlands) Groningen (9th)	(Northern Ireland) Cliftonville (6th)	(Norway) Lillestrøm (4th)	(Poland) ŁKS Łódź (4th)
Group stage	(Poland) Zagłębie Lubin (10th)	(Romania) Universitatea Craiova (4th)	(Romania) Dinamo Bucharest (5th)	(Russia) Rotor Volgograd (7th)
Group stage	(Russia) Uralmash Yekaterinburg (8th)	(Russia) KAMAZ-Chally Naberezhnye Chelny (9th)	(Slovakia) Spartak Trnava (3rd)	(Slovenia) Maribor (4th)
Group stage	(Sweden) Örebro (5th)	(Sweden) Djurgården (6th)	(Sweden) Örgryte (7th)	(Switzerland) Luzern (5th)
Group stage	(Switzerland) Basel (6th)	(Turkey) Kocaelispor (5th)	(Turkey) Gaziantepspor (6th)	(Turkey) Antalyaspor (7th)
Group stage	(Ukraine) Shakhtar Donetsk (10th)	(Wales) Conwy United (3rd)	(Federal Republic of Yugoslavia) Zemun (1st)	(Federal Republic of Yugoslavia) Čukarički Stankom (6th)

== Group stage ==
=== Group 1 ===
Pos	Team	Pld	W	D	L	GF	GA	GD	Pts	Qualification	STA	AAL	STU	HHA	CLI
1	(Belgium) Standard Liège	4	3	1	0	8	2	+6	10	Advanced to semi-finals	—	1–0	—	2–2	—
2	(Denmark) AaB	4	3	0	1	10	5	+5	9		—	—	—	5–4	4–0
3	(Germany) Stuttgart	4	2	0	2	8	4	+4	6		0–2	0–1	—	—	—
4	(Israel) Hapoel Haifa	4	0	2	2	7	12	−5	2		—	—	0–4	—	1–1
5	(Northern Ireland) Cliftonville	4	0	1	3	2	12	−10	1		0–3	—	1–4	—	—

Source: rsssf.com
22 June 1996

Cliftonville (Northern Ireland)	0–3	(Belgium) Standard Liège
		Goossens 11', 58'; Bisconti 84'

Solitude, Belfast
Attendance: 630
Referee: Mike McCurry (Scotland)

23 June 1996

AaB (Denmark)	5–4	(Israel) Hapoel Haifa
P. Rasmussen 4', 21', 24'; Madsen 25'; Simonsen 68'		Turgeman 64'; Banin 69' (pen.); Leibovitz 82'; Kaplan 87'

Aalborg Stadium, Aalborg
Attendance: 1,125
Referee: Graham Poll (England)

29 June 1996

Stuttgart (Germany)	0–1	(Denmark) AaB
		Grønkjær 29'

Gottlieb-Daimler-Stadion, Stuttgart
Attendance: 4,981
Referee: Jan Wegereef (Netherlands)

30 June 1996

Hapoel Haifa (Israel)	1–1	(Northern Ireland) Cliftonville
Turgeman 7'		Strang 71'

Nahariya Municipal Stadium, Nahariya
Attendance: 850
Referee: Costas Kapitanis (Cyprus)

6 July 1996

Cliftonville (Northern Ireland)	1–4	(Germany) Stuttgart
Stokes 78'		Élber 10', 45', 87'; Grimm 83'

Solitude, Belfast
Attendance: 630
Referee: Alain Hamer (Luxembourg)

7 July 1996

Standard Liège (Belgium)	2–2	(Israel) Hapoel Haifa
Wamberto 48'; Edmílson 52'		Turgeman 2'; Zuabi 81'

Stade Maurice Dufrasne, Liège
Attendance: 6,486
Referee: Roland Beck (Liechtenstein)

13 July 1996

Stuttgart (Germany)	0–2	(Belgium) Standard Liège
		Edmílson 36'; Krupniković 89'

Gottlieb-Daimler-Stadion, Stuttgart
Attendance: 6,421
Referee: Kurt Zuppinger (Switzerland)

14 July 1996

AaB (Denmark)	4–0	(Northern Ireland) Cliftonville
Andersen 49', 90'; Thomasberg 89'; Madsen 90'

Aalborg Stadium, Aalborg
Attendance: 2,875
Referee: Sven Kjelbrott (Norway)

20 July 1996

Hapoel Haifa (Israel)	0–4	(Germany) Stuttgart
		Hagner 45', 58'; Balakov 54'; Sigurðsson 70'

Nahariya Municipal Stadium, Nahariya
Attendance: 2,500
Referee: Vladimir Ovchinnikov (Russia)

20 July 1996

Standard Liège (Belgium)	1–0	(Denmark) AaB
H. Rasmussen 48' (o.g.)

Stade Maurice Dufrasne, Liège
Attendance: 9,017
Referee: Vítor Melo Pereira (Portugal)

=== Group 2 ===
Pos	Team	Pld	W	D	L	GF	GA	GD	Pts	Qualification	LIN	BRE	DJU	APO	B68
1	(Austria) LASK	4	4	0	0	11	1	+10	12	Advanced to semi-finals	—	—	2–0	2–0	—
2	(Germany) Werder Bremen	4	3	0	1	8	5	+3	9		1–3	—	3–2	—	—
3	(Sweden) Djurgården	4	2	0	2	15	6	+9	6		—	—	—	8–0	5–1
4	(Cyprus) Apollon Limassol	4	1	0	3	4	13	−9	3		—	0–2	—	—	4–1
5	(Faroe Islands) B68 Toftir	4	0	0	4	2	15	−13	0		0–4	0–2	—	—	—

Source: rsssf.com
22 June 1996

Apollon Limassol (Cyprus)	0–2	(Germany) Werder Bremen
		Labbadia 24'; Herzog 62'

Tsirio Stadium, Limassol
Attendance: 300
Referee: Adrian Stoica (Romania)

23 June 1996

LASK (Austria)	2–0	(Sweden) Djurgården
Westerthaler 41', 88'

Union-Stadion, Wels
Attendance: 632
Referee: Attila Juhos (Hungary)

29 June 1996

B68 Toftir (Faroe Islands)	0–4	(Austria) LASK
		Metlitskiy 14'; Westerthaler 19'; Dubajić 21'; Duspara 30'

Svangaskarð, Toftir
Attendance: 50
Referee: Patrick Dempsey (Republic of Ireland)

30 June 1996

Djurgården (Sweden)	8–0	(Cyprus) Apollon Limassol
Eskelinen 2', 72', 90'; Dahlström 9', 33', 62'; Andersson 17'; Banda 36'

Stockholm Olympic Stadium, Stockholm
Attendance: 575
Referee: Zbigniew Przesmycki (Poland)

6 July 1996

Apollon Limassol (Cyprus)	4–1	(Faroe Islands) B68 Toftir
Sofokleous 27'; Kais 32'; Marneros 42'; Tsolakis 53'		Johannesen 63'

Tsirio Stadium, Limassol
Attendance: 162
Referee: Yevi Kollari (Albania)

7 July 1996

Werder Bremen (Germany)	3–2	(Sweden) Djurgården
Brand 17'; Hobsch 26'; Pfeifenberger 66'		Andersson 3'; Júnior Baiano 9' (o.g.)

Weser-Stadion, Bremen
Attendance: 19,895
Referee: Ľuboš Micheľ (Slovakia)

13 July 1996

B68 Toftir (Faroe Islands)	0–2	(Germany) Werder Bremen
		Pfeifenberger 33'; Labbadia 59'

Svangaskarð, Toftir
Attendance: 517
Referee: Claus Bo Larsen (Denmark)

13 July 1996

LASK (Austria)	2–0	(Cyprus) Apollon Limassol
Metlitskiy 2'; Unger 7'

Union-Stadion, Wels
Attendance: 1,500
Referee: Slavoljub Đorđević (FR Yugoslavia)

20 July 1996

Djurgården (Sweden)	5–1	(Faroe Islands) B68 Toftir
Stojcevski 17'; Dahlström 22', 59'; Eskelinen 42', 48'		Højgaard 80'

Stockholm Olympic Stadium, Stockholm
Attendance: 365
Referee: Oleg Timofeev (Estonia)

20 July 1996

Werder Bremen (Germany)	1–3	(Austria) LASK
Pfeifenberger 56' (pen.)		Kauz 50', 90'; Scharrer 86'

Weser-Stadion, Bremen
Attendance: 25,000
Referee: Fernand Meese (Belgium)

=== Group 3 ===
Pos	Team	Pld	W	D	L	GF	GA	GD	Pts	Qualification	ÖRE	COP	MAR	AWI	KEF
1	(Sweden) Örebro	4	3	1	0	12	6	+6	10	Advanced to semi-finals	—	—	4–1	—	3–1
2	(Denmark) Copenhagen	4	3	1	0	7	4	+3	10		2–2	—	—	2–1	—
3	(Slovenia) Maribor	4	1	1	2	4	5	−1	4		—	0–1	—	3–0	—
4	Austria Vienna	4	1	0	3	9	8	+1	3		2–3	—	—	—	6–0
5	(Iceland) Keflavík	4	0	1	3	2	11	−9	1		—	1–2	0–0	—	—

Source: rsssf.com
22 June 1996

Maribor (Slovenia)	3–0	Austria Vienna
Šimundža 1'; Ljubobratović 26'; Kek 73' (pen.)

Ljudski vrt, Maribor
Attendance: 1,500
Referee: Vencel Tóth (Hungary)

23 June 1996

Örebro (Sweden)	3–1	(Iceland) Keflavík
Guðjohnsen 29'; Sahlin 37'; Wallinder 48'		Gylfason 51'

Eyravallen, Örebro
Attendance: 524
Referee: Algirdas Dubinskas (Lithuania)

29 June 1996

Copenhagen (Denmark)	2–2	(Sweden) Örebro
Morten Nielsen 12'; Perez 79'		Sahlin 16'; Kubisztal 85'

Parken Stadium, Copenhagen
Attendance: 1,515
Referee: Georg Dardenne (Germany)

29 June 1996

Keflavík (Iceland)	0–0	(Slovenia) Maribor

Keflavíkurvöllur, Keflavík
Attendance: 250
Referee: Brian Lawlor (Wales)

6 July 1996

Austria Vienna	6–0	(Iceland) Keflavík
Brunmayr 9', 48', 85'; Kellner 24', 72'; Flögel 33'

Franz Horr Stadium, Vienna
Attendance: 800
Referee: Dimitar Momirov (Bulgaria)

6 July 1996

Maribor (Slovenia)	0–1	(Denmark) Copenhagen
		Johansen 33'

Ljudski vrt, Maribor
Attendance: 3,500
Referee: Loizos Loizou (Cyprus)

13 July 1996

Copenhagen (Denmark)	2–1	Austria Vienna
Šestan 52', 67'		Ogris 24'

Parken Stadium, Copenhagen
Attendance: 2,894
Referee: Claude Colombo (France)

14 July 1996

Örebro (Sweden)	4–1	(Slovenia) Maribor
Milinovič 5' (o.g.); Jónsson 28'; Tjernström 65'; Sahlin 78'		Žurman 8'

Eyravallen, Örebro
Attendance: 3,000
Referee: Gennady Yakubovsky (Belarus)

20 July 1996

Keflavík (Iceland)	1–2	(Denmark) Copenhagen
Martin Nielsen 61' (o.g.)		Larsen 12'; Perez 84'

Keflavíkurvöllur, Keflavík
Attendance: 91
Referee: Brian Lawlor (Wales)

20 July 1996

Austria Vienna	2–3	(Sweden) Örebro
Brunmayr 11'; Flögel 52'		Sahlin 59'; Kubisztal 66'; Guðjohnsen 75'

Franz Horr Stadium, Vienna
Attendance: 1,000
Referee: Andreas Schluchter (Switzerland)

=== Group 4 ===
Pos	Team	Pld	W	D	L	GF	GA	GD	Pts	Qualification	SIL	ZAG	CHA	RIE	CON
1	(Denmark) Silkeborg	4	3	1	0	11	2	+9	10	Advanced to semi-finals	—	0–0	—	—	4–0
2	(Poland) Zagłębie Lubin	4	2	2	0	5	1	+4	8		—	—	—	2–1	3–0
3	(Belgium) Charleroi	4	1	2	1	5	5	0	5		2–4	0–0	—	—	—
4	(Austria) Ried	4	1	0	3	4	9	−5	3		0–3	—	1–3	—	—
5	(Wales) Conwy United	4	0	1	3	1	9	−8	1		—	—	0–0	1–2	—

Source: rsssf.com
22 June 1996

Zagłębie Lubin (Poland)	2–1	(Austria) Ried
Szczypkowski 37'; Kałużny 68'		Lesiak 32'

Stadion Zagłębia Lubin, Lubin
Attendance: 594
Referee: Miroslav Liba (Czech Republic)

23 June 1996

Charleroi (Belgium)	2–4	(Denmark) Silkeborg
Remy 35'; Brogno 51'		Larsen 23'; Thygesen 44', 55'; Bruun 45'

Stade du Mambourg, Charleroi
Attendance: 1,071
Referee: Stuart Dougal (Scotland)

29 June 1996

Conwy United (Wales)	0–0	(Belgium) Charleroi

Racecourse Ground, Wrexham
Attendance: 713
Referee: Alan Snoddy (Northern Ireland)

30 June 1996

Silkeborg (Denmark)	0–0	(Poland) Zagłębie Lubin

Randers Stadium, Randers
Attendance: 1,071
Referee: Karl-Erik Nilsson (Sweden)

6 July 1996

Zagłębie Lubin (Poland)	3–0	(Wales) Conwy United
Grzybowski 50', 72'; Górski 64'

Stadion Zagłębia Lubin, Lubin
Attendance: 650
Referee: Štefan Tivold (Slovenia)

7 July 1996

Ried (Austria)	0–3	(Denmark) Silkeborg
		Reese 28'; Joković 48'; Bruun 74'

Union-Stadion, Wels
Attendance: 700
Referee: Juan Fernández Marín (Spain)

13 July 1996

Conwy United (Wales)	1–2	(Austria) Ried
McAuley 4'		Oerlemans 67'; Stanisavljević 81'

Racecourse Ground, Wrexham
Attendance: 425
Referee: Jørn Larsen (Denmark)

14 July 1996

Charleroi (Belgium)	0–0	(Poland) Zagłębie Lubin

Stade du Mambourg, Charleroi
Attendance: 1,040
Referee: Edgar Steinborn (Germany)

20 July 1996

Silkeborg (Denmark)	4–0	(Wales) Conwy United
Fernandez 11', 86'; Duus 28'; Røll 83'

Silkeborg Stadium, Silkeborg
Attendance: 1,248
Referee: Sergejus Slyva (Lithuania)

20 July 1996

Ried (Austria)	1–3	(Belgium) Charleroi
Stanisavljević 89'		Fiers 65'; Brogno 70'; Balog 90'

Rieder Stadion, Ried
Attendance: 1,040
Referee: Metin Tokat (Turkey)

=== Group 5 ===
Pos	Team	Pld	W	D	L	GF	GA	GD	Pts	Qualification	NAN	LIL	HEE	KAU	SLI
1	(France) Nantes	4	3	1	0	12	7	+5	10	Advanced to semi-finals	—	—	3–1	3–1	—
2	(Norway) Lillestrøm	4	3	0	1	11	4	+7	9		2–3	—	—	—	4–0
3	(Netherlands) Heerenveen	4	1	1	2	4	5	−1	4		—	0–1	—	3–1	—
4	(Lithuania) Kaunas	4	1	0	3	4	10	−6	3		—	1–4	—	—	1–0
5	(Republic of Ireland) Sligo Rovers	4	0	2	2	3	8	−5	2		3–3	—	0–0	—	—

Source: rsssf.com
22 June 1996

Sligo Rovers (Republic of Ireland)	0–0	(Netherlands) Heerenveen

The Showgrounds, Sligo
Attendance: 616
Referee: Eyjölfur Ólafsson (Iceland)

23 June 1996

Kaunas (Lithuania)	1–4	(Norway) Lillestrøm
Kirilovas 12'		Solbakken 44'; Sandstø 50'; Werni 53'; Giske 63'

Darius and Girėnas Stadium, Kaunas
Attendance: 1,000
Referee: Manfred Schüttengruber (Austria)

29 June 1996

Nantes (France)	3–1	(Lithuania) Kaunas
N'Doram 4', 60'; Gourvennec 65'		Žalys 68'

Stade de la Beaujoire, Nantes
Attendance: 3,355
Referee: Livio Bazzoli (Italy)

29 June 1996

Lillestrøm (Norway)	4–0	(Republic of Ireland) Sligo Rovers
Stakkeland 35'; Hawtin 51' (o.g.); Bergdølmo 52'; Ensrud 74'

Åråsen Stadion, Lillestrøm

6 July 1996

Sligo Rovers (Republic of Ireland)	3–3	(France) Nantes
Johnny Kenny 13'; Hawtin 20'; Rooney 70'		Gourvennec 21'; N'Doram 23'; Carotti 76' (pen.)

The Showgrounds, Sligo
Attendance: 1,055
Referee: Jürgen Aust (Germany)

7 July 1996

Heerenveen (Netherlands)	0–1	(Norway) Lillestrøm
		Tobiasen 71' (o.g.)

Abe Lenstra Stadion, Heerenveen
Attendance: 4,000
Referee: Luc Huyghe (Belgium)

13 July 1996

Nantes (France)	3–1	(Netherlands) Heerenveen
Kosecki 7'; N'Doram 67'; Le Roux 78'		Tomasson 2'

Stade de la Beaujoire, Nantes
Attendance: 2,217
Referee: Celino Gracia Redondo (Spain)

14 July 1996

Kaunas (Lithuania)	1–0	(Republic of Ireland) Sligo Rovers
Miknevičius 71' (pen.)

Darius and Girėnas Stadium, Kaunas
Attendance: 1,000
Referee: Mitko Mitrev (Bulgaria)

20 July 1996

Lillestrøm (Norway)	2–3	(France) Nantes
Strandli 65', 68'		N'Doram 42', 56'; Le Roux 54'

Åråsen Stadion, Lillestrøm
Attendance: 1,724
Referee: Jarmo Karhunen (Finland)

20 July 1996

Heerenveen (Netherlands)	3–1	(Lithuania) Kaunas
Wouden 15'; Talan 63'; El-Khattabi 89'		Gvildys 13'

Abe Lenstra Stadion, Heerenveen
Attendance: 4,000
Referee: Luc Huyghe (Belgium)

=== Group 6 ===
Pos	Team	Pld	W	D	L	GF	GA	GD	Pts	Qualification	SEG	ÖRG	LUC	REN	HTA
1	(Croatia) Segesta	4	3	1	0	7	3	+4	10	Advanced to semi-finals	—	1–1	—	2–1	—
2	(Sweden) Örgryte	4	2	2	0	8	2	+6	8		—	—	3–0	—	3–0
3	(Switzerland) Luzern	4	2	0	2	4	5	−1	6		0–1	—	—	—	2–0
4	(France) Rennes	4	1	1	2	5	5	0	4		—	1–1	1–2	—	—
5	(Israel) Hapoel Tel Aviv	4	0	0	4	1	10	−9	0		1–3	—	—	0–2	—

Source: rsssf.com
22 June 1996

Örgryte (Sweden)	3–0	(Switzerland) Luzern
Samuelsson 4'; Allbäck 67', 71'

Slottsskogsvallen, Gothenburg
Attendance: 405
Referee: Robert Boggi (Italy)

23 June 1996

Hapoel Tel Aviv (Israel)	0–2	(France) Rennes
		Guivarc'h 32', 34'

Bloomfield Stadium, Tel Aviv
Attendance: 100
Referee: Gheorge Constantin (Romania)

29 June 1996

Segesta (Croatia)	1–1	(Sweden) Örgryte
Buinac 6'		Bertilsson 41'

Gradski stadion, Sisak
Attendance: 1,500
Referee: Marnix Sandra (Belgium)

30 June 1996

Luzern (Switzerland)	2–0	(Israel) Hapoel Tel Aviv
Wyss 47'; Sawu 67'

Stadion Allmend, Lucerne
Attendance: 1,088
Referee: Sergei Tatulyan (Ukraine)

6 July 1996

Hapoel Tel Aviv (Israel)	1–3	(Croatia) Segesta
Brnas 1' (o.g.)		Vukas 20', 37'; Petrović 32'

Bloomfield Stadium, Tel Aviv
Attendance: 205
Referee: Oğuz Sarvan (Turkey)

7 July 1996

Rennes (France)	1–2	(Switzerland) Luzern
Merdy 62'		Sawu 54', 60'

Stade de la Route de Lorient, Rennes
Attendance: 1,969
Referee: Ladislav Gádoši (Slovakia)

13 July 1996

Segesta (Croatia)	2–1	(France) Rennes
Buinac 17'; Vukas 47'		Guivarc'h 89'

Gradski stadion, Sisak
Attendance: 597
Referee: Marcello Nicchi (Italy)

14 July 1996

Örgryte (Sweden)	3–0	(Israel) Hapoel Tel Aviv
Sjöstedt 38'; Bertilsson 88'; Samuelsson 90'

Slottsskogsvallen, Gothenburg
Attendance: 1,118
Referee: Fritz Stuchlik (Austria)

20 July 1996

Luzern (Switzerland)	0–1	(Croatia) Segesta
		Šašivarević 81'

Stadion Allmend, Lucerne
Attendance: 1,400
Referee: Keimpe Zuidema (Netherlands)

20 July 1996

Rennes (France)	1–1	(Sweden) Örgryte
Guivarc'h 89'		Karlsson 81'

Stade de la Route de Lorient, Rennes
Attendance: 1,143
Referee: Paul Durkin (England)

=== Group 7 ===
Pos	Team	Pld	W	D	L	GF	GA	GD	Pts	Qualification	ROT	BAS	ANT	SHA	AAM
1	(Russia) Rotor Volgograd	4	3	0	1	12	5	+7	9	Advanced to semi-finals	—	3–2	—	4–1	—
2	(Switzerland) Basel	4	2	1	1	14	7	+7	7		—	—	—	2–2	5–0
3	(Turkey) Antalyaspor	4	2	0	2	7	7	0	6		2–1	2–5	—	—	—
4	(Ukraine) Shakhtar Donetsk	4	1	1	2	5	8	−3	4		—	—	1–0	—	1–2
5	(Belarus) Ataka-Aura Minsk	4	1	0	3	2	13	−11	3		0–4	—	0–3	—	—

Source: rsssf.com
22 June 1996
18:00 UTC+2

Ataka-Aura Minsk (Belarus)	0–4	(Russia) Rotor Volgograd
		Abramov 41'; Veretennikov 61', 63'; Orbu 69'

City Stadium, Molodechno
Attendance: 3,000
Referee: Otar Guntadze (Georgia)

22 June 1996
10:15

Basel (Switzerland)	2–2	(Ukraine) Shakhtar Donetsk
Zuffi 12'; H. Yakin 80'	Summary	Ostachov 22'; Pyatenko 57'

St. Jakob Stadium, Basel
Attendance: 2,000
Referee: Darko Cvitkovic (Croatia)

29 June 1996
18:00 UTC+2

Shakhtar Donetsk (Ukraine)	1–2	(Belarus) Ataka-Aura Minsk
Yaksmanitsky 4'		Doroshkevich 32'; Maleyev 85'

Shakhtar Stadium, Donetsk
Attendance: 8,000
Referee: Karen Nalbandyan (Armenia)

29 June 1996
17:30

Antalyaspor (Turkey)	2–5	(Switzerland) Basel
Yılmaz 2'; Kamburoğlu 34'	Summary	Smajić 23'; Moser 25'; H. Yakin 29'; Giallanza 56'; La Placa 61'

Isparta Atatürk Stadium, Isparta
Attendance: 4,600
Referee: Gheorghe Constantin (Romania)

6 July 1996

Rotor Volgograd (Russia)	4–1	(Ukraine) Shakhtar Donetsk
Zernov 7'; Abramov 48'; Veretennikov 59', 89'		Kovalyov 44'

Central Stadium, Volgograd
Attendance: 10,000
Referee: Tudor Cepoi (Moldova)

7 July 1996
18:00 UTC+2

Ataka-Aura Minsk (Belarus)	0–3	(Turkey) Antalyaspor
		N'Gole 8', 55'; Murat Özduran 38'

City Stadium, Molodechno
Attendance: 3,500
Referee: Stahl (Sweden)

13 July 1996

Antalyaspor (Turkey)	2–1	(Russia) Rotor Volgograd
N'Gole 14'; Khuse 21'		Veretennikov 70'

Isparta Atatürk Stadium, Isparta
Attendance: 6,000
Referee: Alfred Micallef (Malta)

13 July 1996
20:00

Basel (Switzerland)	5–0	(Belarus) Ataka-Aura Minsk
Nyarko 20'; Moser 22'; La Placa 42'; Frick 53'; Armentano 67'	Summary

St. Jakob Stadium, Basel
Attendance: 4,200
Referee: Vanco Kocev (Macedonia)

20 July 1996
18:00

Rotor Volgograd (Russia)	3–2	(Switzerland) Basel
Niederhaus 18'; Yesipov 38'; Veretennikov 57'	Summary	Orlando 29'; Giallanza 30'

Central Stadium, Volgograd
Attendance: 8,000
Referee: Branimir Babarogić (FR Yugoslavia)

20 July 1996

Shakhtar Donetsk (Ukraine)	1–0	(Turkey) Antalyaspor
Kriventsov 11'

Shakhtar Stadium, Donetsk
Attendance: 1,200
Referee: Marek Kowalczyk (Poland)

=== Group 8 ===
Pos	Team	Pld	W	D	L	GF	GA	GD	Pts	Qualification	KAM	MUN	OPA	SPA	ŁKS
1	(Russia) KAMAZ-Chally Naberezhnye Chelny	4	3	1	0	8	3	+5	10	Advanced to semi-finals	—	—	—	2–2	3–0
2	(Germany) 1860 Munich	4	2	0	2	8	3	+5	6		0–1	—	—	—	5–0
3	(Czech Republic) Kaučuk Opava	4	2	0	2	5	4	+1	6		1–2	0–2	—	—	—
4	(Bulgaria) Spartak Varna	4	1	2	1	5	5	0	5		—	2–1	0–1	—	—
5	(Poland) ŁKS Łódź	4	0	1	3	1	12	−11	1		—	—	0–3	1–1	—

Source: rsssf.com
22 June 1996

Spartak Varna (Bulgaria)	2–1	(Germany) 1860 Munich
Dimitrov 14', 32'		Bodden 83'

Stadion Spartak, Varna
Attendance: 2,324
Referee: Claude Détruche (Switzerland)

23 June 1996

KAMAZ-Chally Naberezhnye Chelny (Russia)	3–0	(Poland) ŁKS Łódź
Klontsak 58'; Yevdokimov 64' (pen.); Babenko 67'

KAMAZ Stadium, Naberezhnye Chelny
Attendance: 5,000
Referee: Vasyl Melnychuk (Ukraine)

29 June 1996

Kaučuk Opava (Czech Republic)	1–2	(Russia) KAMAZ-Chally Naberezhnye Chelny
Rozhon 67'		Babenko 48'; Klontsak 70'

Bazaly, Ostrava
Attendance: 3,000
Referee: Amit Klein (Israel)

30 June 1996

ŁKS Łódź (Poland)	1–1	(Bulgaria) Spartak Varna
Saganowski 9'		Genchev 26'

Stadion Miejski ŁKS, Łódź
Attendance: 1,390
Referee: Jon Skjervold (Norway)

6 July 1996

Spartak Varna (Bulgaria)	0–1	(Czech Republic) Kaučuk Opava
		Hendrych 84'

Stadion Spartak, Varna
Attendance: 1,000
Referee: Albert Wiltgen (Luxembourg)

7 July 1996

1860 Munich (Germany)	5–0	(Poland) ŁKS Łódź
Bodden 61', 78', 88', 89'; Cerny 63'

Grünwalder Stadion, Munich
Attendance: 10,000
Referee: Salem Prolić (Bosnia and Herzegovina)

13 July 1996

Kaučuk Opava (Czech Republic)	0–2	(Germany) 1860 Munich
		Cerny 14'; Nowak 52'

Nova Hut, Ostrava
Attendance: 2,300
Referee: Mateo Beusan (Croatia)

14 July 1996

KAMAZ-Chally Naberezhnye Chelny (Russia)	2–2	(Bulgaria) Spartak Varna
Zayarnyi 61'; Vinnikov 63'		Stanchev 7'; Genchev 45'

KAMAZ Stadium, Naberezhnye Chelny
Attendance: 6,000
Referee: Bohdan Benedik (Slovakia)

20 July 1996

ŁKS Łódź (Poland)	0–3	(Czech Republic) Kaučuk Opava
		Janoušek 32'; Baránek 74'; Rozsypal 90'

Stadion Miejski ŁKS, Łódź
Attendance: 500
Referee: Jon Skjervold (Norway)

20 July 1996

1860 Munich (Germany)	0–1	(Russia) KAMAZ-Chally Naberezhnye Chelny
		Jishkariani 70'

Grünwalder Stadion, Munich
Attendance: 20,600
Referee: Philippe Leduc (France)

=== Group 9 ===
Pos	Team	Pld	W	D	L	GF	GA	GD	Pts	Qualification	KAR	UCR	TRV	DAU	ČUK
1	(Germany) Karlsruhe	4	3	1	0	7	2	+5	10	Advanced to semi-finals	—	1–0	—	—	3–0
2	(Romania) Universitatea Craiova	4	3	0	1	7	3	+4	9		—	—	2–1	3–0	—
3	(Slovakia) Spartak Trnava	4	2	1	1	11	3	+8	7		1–1	—	—	—	3–0
4	(Latvia) Daugava	4	1	0	3	4	12	−8	3		1–2	—	0–6	—	—
5	(Federal Republic of Yugoslavia) Čukarički Stankom	4	0	0	4	2	11	−9	0		—	1–2	—	1–3	—

Source: rsssf.com
22 June 1996

Spartak Trnava (Slovakia)	3–0	(Federal Republic of Yugoslavia) Čukarički Stankom
Kostka 17'; Ujlaky 23', 33'

Anton Malatinský Stadium, Trnava
Attendance: 1,818
Referee: Konrad Plautz (Austria)

23 June 1996

Universitatea Craiova (Romania)	3–0	(Latvia) Daugava
Ungur 37', 51' (pen.); Florescu 71'

Stadionul Central, Craiova
Attendance: 703
Referee: Srečko Kandare (Slovenia)

29 June 1996

Karlsruhe (Germany)	1–0	(Romania) Universitatea Craiova
Curt 88' (o.g.)

Wildparkstadion, Karlsruhe
Attendance: 4,500
Referee: Lucílio Batista (Portugal)

30 June 1996

Daugava (Latvia)	0–6	(Slovakia) Spartak Trnava
		Polyansky 7' (o.g.); Timko 26'; Šimon 40', 62', 84'; Formanko 63'

Daugava Stadium, Riga
Attendance: 1,500
Referee: Lennart Elofsson (Sweden)

6 July 1996

Spartak Trnava (Slovakia)	1–1	(Germany) Karlsruhe
Šimon 39'		Keller 14'

Anton Malatinský Stadium, Trnava
Attendance: 1,818
Referee: Sándor Piller (Hungary)

7 July 1996

Čukarički Stankom (Federal Republic of Yugoslavia)	1–3	(Latvia) Daugava
Vignjević 32'		Butkus 16'; Verbitsky 47'; Miholaps 54'

Partizan Stadium, Belgrade
Attendance: 98
Referee: Sergei Anokhin (Russia)

13 July 1996

Karlsruhe (Germany)	3–0	(Federal Republic of Yugoslavia) Čukarički Stankom
Schmitt 11'; Schuster 28'; Dundee 73'

Wildparkstadion, Karlsruhe
Attendance: 5,500
Referee: José Núñez Manrique (Spain)

14 July 1996

Universitatea Craiova (Romania)	2–1	(Slovakia) Spartak Trnava
Ganea 9'; Popescu 19'		David 26' (o.g.)

Stadionul Central, Craiova
Attendance: 360
Referee: Daood Suheil (Israel)

20 July 1996

Daugava (Latvia)	1–2	(Germany) Karlsruhe
Miholaps 33'		Wittwer 26'; Hengen 58'

Daugava Stadium, Riga
Attendance: 3,500
Referee: Mikko Vuorela (Finland)

20 July 1996

Čukarički Stankom (Federal Republic of Yugoslavia)	1–2	(Romania) Universitatea Craiova
Antunović 28'		Cristescu 53'; Ungur 61'

Partizan Stadium, Belgrade
Attendance: 43
Referee: Pascal Garibian (France)

=== Group 10 ===
Pos	Team	Pld	W	D	L	GF	GA	GD	Pts	Qualification	LIE	VAS	GRO	GAZ	NAR
1	(Belgium) Lierse	4	3	0	1	6	3	+3	9	Advanced to semi-finals	—	—	2–1	1–0	—
2	(Hungary) Vasas	4	2	1	1	9	5	+4	7		2–0	—	—	—	4–1
3	(Netherlands) Groningen	4	1	2	1	7	5	+2	5		—	1–1	—	1–1	—
4	(Turkey) Gaziantepspor	4	1	2	1	4	4	0	5		—	3–2	—	—	0–0
5	(Estonia) Narva Trans	4	0	1	3	2	11	−9	1		0–3	—	1–4	—	—

Source: rsssf.com
22 June 1996

Vasas (Hungary)	2–0	(Belgium) Lierse
Sandjon 34'; Galaschek 72'

Fáy utcai Stadion, Budapest
Attendance: 376
Referee: Tomasz Mikulski (Poland)

23 June 1996

Groningen (Netherlands)	1–1	(Turkey) Gaziantepspor
Gall 39' (pen.)		Akçevre 77'

Stadion Oosterpark, Groningen
Attendance: 3,977
Referee: Richard O'Hanlon (Republic of Ireland)

29 June 1996

Narva Trans (Estonia)	1–4	(Netherlands) Groningen
Zamorski 3'		Veenhof 26'; Gorré 49', 81'; Kooistra 53'

Narva Kreenholm Stadium, Narva
Attendance: 127
Referee: Taras Bezubyak (Russia)

30 June 1996

Gaziantepspor (Turkey)	3–2	(Hungary) Vasas
Gönülaçar 38', 42'; İkizer 55'		Fischer 15'; Szilveszter 44'

Gaziantep Kamil Ocak Stadium, Gaziantep
Attendance: 6,155
Referee: Charles Agius (Malta)

6 July 1996

Vasas (Hungary)	4–1	(Estonia) Narva Trans
Fischer 26', 87'; Váczi 56'; Koltai 90'		Golitsõn 75'

Fáy utcai Stadion, Budapest
Attendance: 825
Referee: Dan Dragoş Crăciun (Romania)

7 July 1996

Lierse (Belgium)	1–0	(Turkey) Gaziantepspor
Van Kerckhoven 61'

Herman Vanderpoortenstadion, Lier
Attendance: 6,500
Referee: Knud Stadsgaard (Denmark)

13 July 1996

Narva Trans (Estonia)	0–3	(Belgium) Lierse
		Van Kerckhoven 17'; Rekdal 51'; Zé Filho 72'

Narva Kreenholm Stadium, Narva
Attendance: 60
Referee: Peter Lerchenmüller (Austria)

14 July 1996

Groningen (Netherlands)	1–1	(Hungary) Vasas
Rosén 73'		Fischer 28'

Stadion Oosterpark, Groningen
Attendance: 1,963
Referee: Lutz-Michael Fröhlich (Germany)

20 July 1996

Gaziantepspor (Turkey)	0–0	(Estonia) Narva Trans

Gaziantep Kamil Ocak Stadium, Gaziantep
Attendance: 3,054
Referee: Merab Malagurazde (Georgia)

20 July 1996

Lierse (Belgium)	2–1	(Netherlands) Groningen
Van Kerckhoven 30'; Zé Filho 85'		Koeman 62'

Herman Vanderpoortenstadion, Lier
Attendance: 4,281
Referee: Stefano Braschi (Italy)

=== Group 11 ===
Pos	Team	Pld	W	D	L	GF	GA	GD	Pts	Qualification	URA	CSK	STR	KOC	HIB
1	(Russia) Uralmash Yekaterinburg	4	3	1	0	7	3	+4	10	Advanced to semi-finals	—	2–1	—	2–0	—
2	(Bulgaria) CSKA Sofia	4	2	1	1	8	4	+4	7		—	—	0–0	—	4–1
3	(France) Strasbourg	4	1	3	0	4	2	+2	6		1–1	—	—	1–1	—
4	(Turkey) Kocaelispor	4	1	1	2	7	9	−2	4		—	1–3	—	—	5–3
5	(Malta) Hibernians	4	0	0	4	5	13	−8	0		1–2	—	0–2	—	—

Source: rsssf.com
22 June 1996

Hibernians (Malta)	1–2	(Russia) Uralmash Yekaterinburg
Crawley 86'		Yamlikhanov 46'; Khankeyev 80'

Hibernians Ground, Paola
Attendance: 2,000
Referee: John Ashman (Wales)

23 June 1996

Kocaelispor (Turkey)	1–3	(Bulgaria) CSKA Sofia
Moshoeu 52'		Zhabov 9', 74'; Nankov 45'

İzmit İsmetpaşa Stadium, İzmit
Attendance: 15,376
Referee: Werner Müller (Switzerland)

29 June 1996

Strasbourg (France)	1–1	(Turkey) Kocaelispor
Collet 70'		Dąbrowski 79'

Stade de la Meinau, Strasbourg
Attendance: 6,704
Referee: Hugo Luyten (Belgium)

29 June 1996

CSKA Sofia (Bulgaria)	4–1	(Malta) Hibernians
Voynov 37' (pen.); Deyanov 60'; Vidolov 62'; Zhabov 67'		Delia 78'

Balgarska Armia Stadium, Sofia
Attendance: 2,000
Referee: Pavlín Jirků (Czech Republic)

6 July 1996

Hibernians (Malta)	0–2	(France) Strasbourg
		Baticle 10'; Rodriguez 29'

Hibernians Ground, Paola
Attendance: 700
Referee: Luan Zylfo (Albania)

6 July 1996

Uralmash Yekaterinburg (Russia)	2–1	(Bulgaria) CSKA Sofia
Litvinov 34', 58'		Slavchev 23'

Central Stadium, Yekaterinburg
Attendance: 4,000
Referee: Sergey Shmolik (Belarus)

13 July 1996

Strasbourg (France)	1–1	(Russia) Uralmash Yekaterinburg
Baticle 35'		Litvinov 41'

Stade de la Meinau, Strasbourg
Attendance: 8,000
Referee: Jorge Emanuel Monteiro Coroado (Portugal)

14 July 1996

Kocaelispor (Turkey)	5–3	(Malta) Hibernians
Faruk 2', 12'; Dąbrowski 18', 32'; Saffet 53'		Attard 32', 75'; Crawley 40'

İzmit İsmetpaşa Stadium, İzmit
Attendance: 1,873
Referee: Tahir Suleymanov (Azerbaijan)

20 July 1996

CSKA Sofia (Bulgaria)	0–0	(France) Strasbourg

Balgarska Armia Stadium, Sofia
Attendance: 7,000
Referee: Valeriy Onufer (Ukraine)

20 July 1996

Uralmash Yekaterinburg (Russia)	2–0	(Turkey) Kocaelispor
Osinov 2'; Kokarev 56'

Central Stadium, Yekaterinburg
Attendance: 3,000
Referee: Mika Peltola (Finland)

=== Group 12 ===
Pos	Team	Pld	W	D	L	GF	GA	GD	Pts	Qualification	GUI	ZEM	JAR	DIN	KOL
1	(France) Guingamp	4	3	1	0	6	2	+4	10	Advanced to semi-finals	—	1–0	—	2–1	—
2	(Federal Republic of Yugoslavia) Zemun	4	3	0	1	8	6	+2	9		—	—	3–2	2–1	—
3	(Finland) Jaro	4	2	1	1	6	3	+3	7		0–0	—	—	—	2–0
4	(Romania) Dinamo Bucharest	4	1	0	3	4	6	−2	3		—	—	0–2	—	2–0
5	(Georgia (country)) Kolkheti Poti	4	0	0	4	3	10	−7	0		1–3	2–3	—	—	—

Source: rsssf.com
22 June 1996

Jaro (Finland)	0–0	(France) Guingamp

Jakobstads Centralplan, Jakobstad
Attendance: 1,805
Referee: Terje Hauge (Norway)

23 June 1996

Zemun (Federal Republic of Yugoslavia)	2–1	(Romania) Dinamo Bucharest
Inđić 69'; Džodić 83'		Coporan 51'

Red Star Stadium, Belgrade
Attendance: 600
Referee: Vladimír Hriňák (Slovakia)

29 June 1996

Kolkheti Poti (Georgia (country))	2–3	(Federal Republic of Yugoslavia) Zemun
Ambidze 2'; Kikliashvili 67'		Isailović 10', 25'; Radulović 26'

Central Stadium, Batumi
Attendance: 3,000
Referee: Vahap Beyaz (Turkey)

30 June 1996

Dinamo Bucharest (Romania)	0–2	(Finland) Jaro
		Vanhala 19'; Yeryomenko 51'

Stadionul Dinamo, Bucharest
Attendance: 1,006
Referee: Herman van Dijk (Netherlands)

6 July 1996

Jaro (Finland)	2–0	(Georgia (country)) Kolkheti Poti
Yeryomenko 7'; Vidjeskog 68'

Jakobstads Centralplan, Jakobstad
Attendance: 1,549
Referee: George Keatley (Northern Ireland)

7 July 1996

Guingamp (France)	2–1	(Romania) Dinamo Bucharest
Carnot 43'; Jóźwiak 70'		Petre 67'

Stade de Roudourou, Guingamp
Attendance: 4,392
Referee: Alfredo Trentalange (Italy)

13 July 1996

Kolkheti Poti (Georgia (country))	1–3	(France) Guingamp
Ambidze 70'		Carnot 22'; Baret 59'; Horlaville 64'

Fazisi Stadium, Poti
Attendance: 2,500
Referee: Andrey Butenko (Russia)

14 July 1996

Zemun (Federal Republic of Yugoslavia)	3–2	(Finland) Jaro
Banjac 9'; Ilić 74'; Martinović 89'		Yeryomenko 54'; Vanhala 90'

Red Star Stadium, Belgrade
Attendance: 586
Referee: Vladimír Hriňák (Bulgaria)

20 July 1996

Dinamo Bucharest (Romania)	2–0	(Georgia (country)) Kolkheti Poti
Grozavu 1'; Petre 38'

Stadionul Dinamo, Bucharest
Attendance: 600
Referee: Hermann Albrecht (Germany)

20 July 1996

Guingamp (France)	1–0	(Federal Republic of Yugoslavia) Zemun
Carnot 23'

Stade de Roudourou, Guingamp
Attendance: 2,695
Referee: Eric Blareau (Belgium)

== Semi-finals ==
=== Summary ===
Team 1	Agg.	Team 2	1st leg	2nd leg
Segesta (Croatia)	5–4	(Sweden) Örebro	4–0	1–4
Uralmash Yekaterinburg (Russia)	2–2 (a)	(Denmark) Silkeborg	1–2	1–0
LASK (Austria)	2–7	(Russia) Rotor Volgograd	2–2	0–5
KAMAZ-Chally Naberezhnye Chelny (Russia)	2–4	(France) Guingamp	2–0	0–4 (a.e.t.)
Standard Liège (Belgium)	3–1	(France) Nantes	2–1	1–0
Lierse (Belgium)	2–5	(Germany) Karlsruhe	2–3	0–2

=== Matches ===
27 July 1996

Segesta (Croatia)	4–0	(Sweden) Örebro
Tadić 44'; Vukas 48', 50', 52'

Gradski stadion, Sisak
Attendance: 3,000
Referee: Alain Hamer (Luxembourg)
31 July 1996

Örebro (Sweden)	4–1	(Croatia) Segesta
Kubisztal 34'; Zetterlund 42'; Sahlin 78'; Wowoah 87'		Vukas 47'

Eyravallen, Örebro
Attendance: 800
Referee: Hartmut Strampe (Germany)

Segesta won 5–4 on aggregate.

27 July 1996

Uralmash Yekaterinburg (Russia)	1–2	(Denmark) Silkeborg
Bakhtin 15'		Bruun 17'; Knudsen 18'

Central Stadium, Yekaterinburg
Attendance: 5,500
Referee: Karol Ihring (Slovakia)
31 July 1996

Silkeborg (Denmark)	0–1	(Russia) Uralmash Yekaterinburg
		Khankeyev 90' (pen.)

Silkeborg Stadion, Silkeborg
Attendance: 12,000
Referee: Jan Wegereef (Netherlands)

2–2 on aggregate; Silkeborg won on away goals.

27 July 1996

KAMAZ-Chally Naberezhnye Chelny (Russia)	2–0	(France) Guingamp
Babenko 33'; Zayarnyi 45'

KAMAZ Stadium, Naberezhnye Chelny
Attendance: 8,000
Referee: Sándor Piller (Hungary)
31 July 1996

Guingamp (France)	4–0 (a.e.t.)	(Russia) KAMAZ-Chally Naberezhnye Chelny
Assadourian 75'; Carnot 88'; Horlaville 97'; Moreira 105'

Stade du Roudourou, Guingamp
Attendance: 4,615
Referee: Sotiris Vorgias (Greece)

Guingamp won 4–2 on aggregate.

27 July 1996

LASK (Austria)	2–2	(Russia) Rotor Volgograd
Westerthaler 1'; Duspara 61'		Veretennikov 25', 29'

Union-Stadion, Wels
Attendance: 5,000
Referee: Daud Suheil (Israel)
31 July 1996

Rotor Volgograd (Russia)	5–0	(Austria) LASK
Berketov 40'; Veretennikov 42', 86'; Zernov 54'; Abramov 72'

Central Stadium, Volgograd
Attendance: 22,000
Referee: Leslie Irvine (Northern Ireland)

Rotor Volgograd won 7–2 on aggregate.

28 July 1996

Standard Liège (Belgium)	2–1	(France) Nantes
Schepens 60' (pen.); Lawarée 73'		Carotti 43'

Stade Maurice Dufrasne, Liège
Attendance: 3,000
Referee: Charles Agius (Malta)
31 July 1996

Nantes (France)	0–1	(Belgium) Standard Liège
		Edmilson 86'

Stade de la Beaujoire, Nantes
Attendance: 9,000
Referee: Ilca Koho (Finland)

Standard Liège won 3–1 on aggregate.

28 July 1996

Lierse (Belgium)	2–3	(Germany) Karlsruhe
Peeters 34' de Roover 59'		Kiriakov 4'; Bähr 52'; Dundee 79'

Herman Vanderpoortenstadion, Lier
Attendance: 4,500
Referee: Aron Huzu (Romania)
31 July 1996

Karlsruhe (Germany)	2–0	(Belgium) Lierse
Häßler 14' (pen.); Keller 31'

Wildparkstadion, Karlsruhe
Attendance: 13,000
Referee: Rémy Harrel (France)

Karlsruhe won 5–2 on aggregate.

== Finals ==
=== Summary ===
Team 1	Agg.	Team 2	1st leg	2nd leg
Segesta (Croatia)	2–2 (a)	(Denmark) Silkeborg	1–2	1–0
Rotor Volgograd (Russia)	2–2 (a)	(France) Guingamp	2–1	0–1
Standard Liège (Belgium)	2–3	(Germany) Karlsruhe	1–0	1–3

=== Matches ===
6 August 1996
17:30

Segesta (Croatia)	1–2	(Denmark) Silkeborg
Vukas 89'	Report	Fernandez 6'; Reese 66'

Gradski stadion, Sisak
Attendance: 2,000
Referee: Ryszard Wójcik (Poland)
20 August 1996
19:00

Silkeborg (Denmark)	0–1	(Croatia) Segesta
	Report	Šašivarević 75'

Silkeborg Stadion, Silkeborg
Attendance: 3,447
Referee: Gerd Grabher (Austria)

2–2 on aggregate; Silkeborg won on away goals.

6 August 1996
18:00

Rotor Volgograd (Russia)	2–1	(France) Guingamp
Zernov 52'; Tishchenko 80'	Report	Horlaville 45'

Central Stadium, Volgograd
Attendance: 29,000
Referee: Georg Dardenne (Germany)
20 August 1996
20:00

Guingamp (France)	1–0	(Russia) Rotor Volgograd
Carnot 75'	Report

Stade du Roudourou, Guingamp
Attendance: 10,000
Referee: Oğuz Sarvan (Turkey)

2–2 on aggregate; Guingamp won on away goals.

6 August 1996
20:00

Standard Liège (Belgium)	1–0	(Germany) Karlsruhe
Bisconti 60'	Report

Stade Maurice Dufrasne, Liège
Attendance: 15,000
Referee: Juan Ansuátegui Roca (Spain)
20 August 1996
18:00

Karlsruhe (Germany)	3–1	(Belgium) Standard Liège
Häßler 38' (pen.); Bender 79'; Schroth 87'	Report	Lawarée 61'

Wildparkstadion, Karlsruhe
Attendance: 22,500
Referee: Anders Frisk (Sweden)

Karlsruhe won 3–2 on aggregate.

== See also ==
- 1996–97 UEFA Champions League
- 1996–97 UEFA Cup Winners' Cup
- 1996–97 UEFA Cup
