= 1996–97 FC Dinamo București season =

FC Dinamo București
1996–97 season
- Head coach: Cornel Țălnar
- Divizia A: 3rd
- Romanian Cup: Semi-finals
- UEFA Intertoto: Group Stage

The 1996–97 season was FC Dinamo București's 48th season in Divizia A. Dinamo finished third in the league and reached the semi-finals of the Romanian Cup. In the UEFA Intertoto Cup, they played in the group stage.

== Players ==
=== Squad information ===
Squad at end of season

Note: Flags indicate national team as defined under FIFA eligibility rules; some limited exceptions apply. Players may hold more than one non-FIFA nationality.

No.	Pos.	Nation	Player
—	GK	ROU	Florin Prunea
—	GK	ROU	Daniel Tudor
—	DF	ROU	Cosmin Contra
—	DF	ROU	Marian Pană
—	DF	ROU	Lucian Cotora
—	DF	ROU	Florin Bătrânu
—	DF	ROU	Leontin Grozavu
—	DF	ROU	Cosmin Bodea
—	DF	ROU	Florin Macavei
—	DF	ROU	Cornel Mihart
—	DF	ROU	Cosmin Gheorghiță
—	DF	ROU	Iosif Tâlvan
—	DF	ROU	Claudiu Mutu
—	DF	ROU	Giani Kiriţă
—	DF	ROU	Narcis Mohora

No.	Pos.	Nation	Player
—	MF	ROU	Florentin Petre
—	MF	ROU	Cătălin Hîldan
—	MF	ROU	Mihai Tararache
—	MF	ROU	Marius Coporan
—	MF	ROU	Paul Codrea
—	MF	ROU	Cezar Dinu
—	MF	ROU	Cătălin Stoian
—	MF	ROU	Florian Simion
—	MF	ROU	Sebastian Moga
—	MF	ROU	Rodin Voinea
—	MF	ROU	Dănuț Lupu
—	MF	ROU	Iulian Chiriţă
—	FW	ROU	Ionel Dănciulescu
—	FW	ROU	Marian Ivan
—	FW	ROU	Adrian Mihalcea
—	FW	ROU	Marius Niculae
—	FW	YUG	Slaviša Čula
—	FW	BIH	Nikola Jokišić

== League table ==
Pos	Team	Pld	W	D	L	GF	GA	GD	Pts	Qualification or relegation
1	Steaua București (C)	34	23	4	7	87	40	+47	73	Qualification to Champions League first qualifying round
2	Național București	34	21	5	8	69	36	+33	68	Qualification to Cup Winners' Cup qualifying round
3	Dinamo București	34	18	5	11	56	34	+22	59	Qualification to UEFA Cup first qualifying round
4	Oțelul Galați	34	17	7	10	54	39	+15	58	Qualification to UEFA Cup first qualifying round
5	Bacău	34	16	5	13	43	41	+2	53	
6	Ceahlăul Piatra Neamț	34	15	7	12	51	50	+1	52	
7	Argeș Pitești	34	14	8	12	46	37	+9	50	
8	Rapid București	34	13	9	12	45	41	+4	48	Qualification to Intertoto Cup group stage
9	Petrolul Ploiești	34	13	7	14	48	43	+5	46 (Note: PET 3-0 FAR; FAR 1-0 PET)	
10	Farul Constanța	34	14	4	16	46	52	−6	46	
11	Universitatea Craiova	34	12	7	15	48	52	−4	43	
12	Sportul Studențesc București	34	12	6	16	36	52	−16	42	
13	Gloria Bistrița	34	11	8	15	38	45	−7	41 (Note: GLO 3-0 JIU; JIU 2-0 GLO)	Qualification to Intertoto Cup group stage
14	Jiul Petroşani	34	12	5	17	33	61	−28	41	
15	Universitatea Cluj	34	11	6	17	52	67	−15	39	
16	Chindia Târgoviște	34	11	5	18	32	55	−23	38	
17	Politehnica Timișoara (R)	34	10	5	19	45	65	−20	35	Relegation to Divizia B
18	Brașov (R)	34	9	5	20	42	61	−19	32	Relegation to Divizia B

Source: LT (in Romanian)
Rules for classification: 1) points; 2) head-to-head points; 3) head-to-head goal difference; 4) head-to-head goals scored; 5) goal difference; 6) number of goals scored. Head-to-Head: used when head-to-head record is used to rank tied teams.
(C) Champions; (R) Relegated

== Results ==
Dinamo's score comes first

=== Legend ===
Win	Draw	Loss

=== Divizia A ===
Date	Opponent	Venue	Result	Scorers
31 July 1996	Gloria Bistrița	H	3–0	
12 August 1996	Petrolul Ploiești	A	1–0	
17 August 1996	Sportul Studențesc București	H	2–1	
25 August 1996	Jiul Petroşani	A	0–1	
7 September 1996	Argeș Pitești	H	4–1	
15 September 1996	Oțelul Galați	A	1–3	
21 September 1996	Universitatea Craiova	A	2–0	
28 September 1996	Politehnica Timișoara	H	2–0	
2 October 1996	Universitatea Cluj	A	1–1	
20 October 1996	Național București	H	0–1	
26 October 1996	Chindia Târgoviște	A	1–1	
2 November 1996	Steaua București	H	0–0	
6 November 1996	Ceahlăul Piatra Neamț	A	1–1	
10 November 1996	FCM Bacău	H	1–0	
16 November 1996	Rapid București	A	0–3	
24 November 1996	Farul Constanța	H	5–2	
7 December 1996	FC Brașov	A	1–2	
2 March 1997	Gloria Bistrița	A	0–1	
9 March 1997	Petrolul Ploiești	H	3–1	
12 March 1997	Sportul Studențesc București	A	5–0	
16 March 1997	Jiul Petroşani	H	3–0	
23 March 1997	Argeș Pitești	A	0–0	
6 April 1997	Oțelul Galați	H	2–0	
9 April 1997	Universitatea Craiova	H	2–0	
13 April 1997	Politehnica Timișoara	A	0–3	
19 April 1997	Universitatea Cluj	H	3–0	
23 April 1997	Național București	A	1–2	
4 May 1997	Chindia Târgoviște	H	2–1	
11 May 1997	Steaua București	A	1–3	
18 May 1997	Ceahlăul Piatra Neamț	H	4–1	
24 May 1997	FCM Bacău	A	0–2	
31 May 1997	Rapid București	H	2–0	
7 June 1997	Farul Constanța	A	1–2	
14 June 1997	FC Brașov	H	2–1	

=== Cupa României ===
Round	Date	Opponent	Venue	Result	Goalscorers
R of 32	30 November 1996	Dacia Piteşti	A	2–1	
R of 16	7 May 1997	Oțelul Galați	H	1–1 (a.e.t.) (7–6 p)	
QF	14 May 1997	CSM Reșița	H	4–1	
SF	21 May 1997	Naţional București	A	1–2	

=== UEFA Intertoto ===
==== Group 12 ====
Pos	Team	Pld	W	D	L	GF	GA	GD	Pts	Qualification
1	(France) Guingamp	4	3	1	0	6	2	+4	10	Advanced to semi-finals
2	(Federal Republic of Yugoslavia) Zemun	4	3	0	1	8	6	+2	9	
3	(Finland) Jaro	4	2	1	1	6	3	+3	7	
4	(Romania) Dinamo Bucharest	4	1	0	3	4	6	−2	3	
5	(Georgia (country)) Kolkheti Poti	4	0	0	4	3	10	−7	0	

Source: rsssf.com
23 June 1996

Zemun (Federal Republic of Yugoslavia)	2–1	(Romania) Dinamo Bucharest
Inđić 69'; Džodić 83'		Coporan 51'

Red Star Stadium, Belgrade
Attendance: 600
Referee: Vladimír Hriňák (Slovakia)

30 June 1996

Dinamo Bucharest (Romania)	0–2	(Finland) Jaro
		Vanhala 19'; Yeryomenko 51'

Stadionul Dinamo, Bucharest
Attendance: 1,006
Referee: Herman van Dijk (Netherlands)

7 July 1996

Guingamp (France)	2–1	(Romania) Dinamo Bucharest
Carnot 43'; Jóźwiak 70'		Petre 67'

Stade de Roudourou, Guingamp
Attendance: 4,392
Referee: Alfredo Trentalange (Italy)

20 July 1996

Dinamo Bucharest (Romania)	2–0	(Georgia (country)) Kolkheti Poti
Grozavu 1'; Petre 38'

Stadionul Dinamo, Bucharest
Attendance: 600
Referee: Hermann Albrecht (Germany)
