= Peter Knudsen =

Peter Knudsen may refer to:

- Peter Christian Knudsen, politician
- Peter Knudsen (footballer, born 1970)
- Peter Knudsen (footballer, born 1973)
- Peter Knudsen (musician) (born 1980)
- Peter Øvig Knudsen (born 1961), writer
