= Carlos Banda =

Carlos Banda may refer to:

- Carlos Banda (footballer, born 1977), Swedish footballer
- Carlos Banda (footballer, born 1978), Swedish footballer and football manager
