= Allan Reese =

Danish footballer (born 1967)

Personal information
- Date of birth: 26 July 1967 (age 59)
- Place of birth: Haderslev
- Position: Forward

Senior career*
Years	Team	Apps	(Gls)
1986–1989	AGF Aarhus		
1988	→ B 1913		
1990–1991	Viborg FF		
1992–1997	Silkeborg IF		
1997–1999	AGF Aarhus		

International career
- Denmark u-21
- * Club domestic league appearances and goals

Allan Reese (born 26 July 1967) is a Danish retired football striker.

== Honours ==
Silkeborg

- Danish Superliga: 1993–94
- UEFA Intertoto Cup: 1996
