= Andrzej Szczypkowski =

Polish footballer

Anrzej Szczypkowski
Personal information
- Full name: Andrzej Szczypkowski
- Date of birth: 10 November 1971 (age 54)
- Place of birth: Oleśnica, Poland
- Height: 1.78 m (5 ft 10 in)
- Position: Midfielder

Youth career
- LZS Stronia

Senior career*
| Years | Team | Apps | (Gls) |
| 1988–1992 | Pogoń Oleśnica | | |
| 1993 | Ślęza Wrocław | | |
| 1993–1995 | Pogoń Oleśnica | | |
| 1995–2008 | Zagłębie Lubin | 281 | (21) |
| 2000 | → Odra Opole (loan) | | |
| 2008–2009 | Pogoń Oleśnica | | |
| 2010–2011 | Widawa Bierutów | | |
| 2011–2012 | Pogoń Oleśnica | | |
- * Club domestic league appearances and goals

Andrzej Szczypkowski (born 10 November 1971) is a Polish former professional footballer who played as a midfielder. A long-time player of Zagłębie Lubin, he was their captain during the 2006–07 title winning campaign.

== Honours ==
Zagłębie Lubin

- Ekstraklasa: 2006–07
