= Gert Nilsson =

Swedish footballer

Personal information
- Full name: Gert Evan Nilsson
- Date of birth: 7 February 1932
- Place of birth: Malmö, Sweden
- Date of death: 9 November 2016 (aged 84)
- Position: Forward

Senior career*
Years	Team	Apps	(Gls)
1953–1955	Malmö FF	7	(0)
1955–1962	IFK Malmö	101	(13)
- * Club domestic league appearances and goals

Gert Evan Nilsson (7 February 1932 – 9 November 2016) was a Swedish footballer who played as a forward. He played for Malmö FF from 1953 to 1955 and later for IFK Malmö from 1955 to 1962.
