= Morten Bruun =

Danish footballer (born 1965)

Personal information
- Full name: Morten Bruun
- Date of birth: 28 June 1965 (age 61)
- Place of birth: Højslev Stationsby, Denmark
- Position: Defender

Senior career*
Years	Team	Apps	(Gls)
1988–2001	Silkeborg IF	424	(35)

International career
1990–1992	Denmark	11	(0)

Managerial career
- 2001–2002: Silkeborg IF
- 2005–2006: SønderjyskE
Medal record
Men's football
Representing Denmark
UEFA European Championship
Winner	1992 Sweden
- * Club domestic league appearances and goals

Morten Bruun (born 28 June 1965) is a Danish former professional footballer who played his entire career for Silkeborg IF. With them, he won the 1993–94 Danish Superliga and 2001 Danish Cup trophies. He played 424 matches and scored 35 goals for the club from 1988 to 2001, which is a club record. He played 11 games for the Denmark national football team, and was an unused substitute when Denmark won the Euro 1992 tournament.

He was brought back to Silkeborg IF as manager in October 2001. He managed the club for nine months, and succeeded in avoiding relegation to the Danish 1st Division. In September 2005, he was appointed manager of SønderjyskE where he stayed for eight months until he was fired, allegedly due to lack of support among the players.

Bruun is currently a football expert for TV channel TV2 Sport in Denmark which allows him to travel in England and Spain commenting on live matches. He has also been a coach in IF Lyseng youth department (U13 boys).

== Honours ==
Denmark

- UEFA European Football Championship: 1992

Silkeborg

- Danish Superliga: 1993–94
- UEFA Intertoto Cup: 1996
- Danish Cup: 2000–01

== See also ==
- One-club man
