= Jörgen Lundgren =

Swedish footballer (born 1969)

Personal information
- Date of birth: 22 July 1969 (age 57)
- Position: Defender

Senior career*
Years	Team	Apps	(Gls)
–1988	Umeå FC		
1989–1992	Malmö FF	16	(0)
1993–1999	Umeå FC		
- * Club domestic league appearances and goals

Jörgen Lundgren (born 22 July 1969) is a Swedish former footballer who played as a defender.

He played in Allsvenskan for Malmö FF and Umeå FC.
