= Christian Duus =

Danish footballer (born 1974)

Personal information
- Full name: Christian Duus Pedersen
- Date of birth: 21 May 1974 (age 52)
- Position: Defender

Senior career*
Years	Team	Apps	(Gls)
1991–2005	Silkeborg IF		

International career
- Denmark u-21
- * Club domestic league appearances and goals

Christian Duus Pedersen (born 21 May 1974) is a Danish retired football defender.

== Honours ==
Silkeborg

- Danish Superliga: 1993–94
- UEFA Intertoto Cup: 1996
