= 1990 Allsvenskan =

66th season of Allsvenskan

Allsvenskan
- Season: 1990
- Champions: IFK Göteborg (Allsvenskan champions and Swedish champions after play-offs)
- Relegated: IK Brage; Örgryte IS; Hammarby IF
- European Cup: IFK Göteborg
- UEFA Cup: Örebro SK; Östers IF
- Top goalscorer: Kaj Eskelinen, IFK Göteborg (10)
- Average attendance: 4,608

Allsvenskan 1990, part of the 1990 Swedish football season, was the 66th Allsvenskan season played. IFK Göteborg won the league ahead of runners-up IFK Norrköping, while IK Brage, Örgryte IS and Hammarby IF were relegated.

== Overview ==
The league was contested by 12 teams, with IFK Göteborg winning the league and the Swedish championship after the play-offs.

== League table ==
Pos	Team	Pld	W	D	L	GF	GA	GD	Pts	Qualification or relegation
1	IFK Göteborg (C, S)	22	14	3	5	39	22	+17	45	Allsvenskan play-offs, Qualification to European Cup first round
2	IFK Norrköping	22	12	4	6	41	23	+18	40	Allsvenskan play-offs, Qualification to Cup Winners' Cup first round (Note: IFK Norrköping qualified for the European Cup Winners' Cup as Svenska Cupen champions 1990–91.)
3	Örebro SK	22	10	6	6	23	17	+6	36	Allsvenskan play-offs, Qualification to UEFA Cup first round
4	Östers IF	22	10	6	6	28	27	+1	36	Allsvenskan play-offs, Qualification to UEFA Cup first round
5	Djurgårdens IF	22	9	6	7	37	23	+14	33	
6	Malmö FF	22	6	10	6	20	15	+5	28	
7	GAIS	22	7	7	8	17	17	0	28	
8	AIK	22	8	3	11	25	39	−14	27	
9	Halmstads BK	22	7	5	10	27	34	−7	26	
10	IK Brage (R)	22	5	9	8	23	26	−3	24	Relegation to Division 1
11	Örgryte IS (R)	22	6	3	13	22	40	−18	21	Relegation to Division 1
12	Hammarby IF (R)	22	5	4	13	32	51	−19	19	Relegation to Division 1

Rules for classification: 1) points; 2) goal difference; 3) number of goals scored.
(C) Allsvenskan Champion; (S) Swedish Champion; (R) Relegated

== Results ==
Home \ Away	AIK	DIF	GAIS	HBK	HIF	IFKG	IFKN	IKB	MFF	ÖSK	ÖIS	ÖIF
AIK		1–0	2–2	2–1	2–0	1–2	1–3	1–0	1–1	1–0	1–0	1–2
Djurgårdens IF	2–1		2–1	2–0	9–1	2–0	0–2	1–1	2–2	0–2	7–1	4–0
GAIS	1–0	0–0		0–0	1–0	0–1	2–0	2–0	0–0	0–1	2–0	3–0
Halmstads BK	2–2	0–0	3–0		4–3	1–0	0–2	2–1	1–2	3–0	0–1	2–0
Hammarby IF	4–1	3–0	0–2	1–2		2–4	2–0	3–1	0–1	0–2	4–2	2–2
IFK Göteborg	5–0	2–1	0–0	3–1	2–2		1–0	1–0	0–0	1–0	3–0	2–0
IFK Norrköping	4–1	3–2	3–0	3–1	3–1	6–0		2–1	1–0	2–2	1–2	2–2
IK Brage	4–2	0–0	1–1	1–1	1–1	2–1	1–1		0–1	0–1	1–1	1–1
Malmö FF	2–3	0–0	0–0	5–0	0–0	0–2	2–0	0–1		0–0	0–2	1–1
Örebro SK	3–0	0–1	1–0	1–0	4–1	2–6	1–0	1–1	0–0		0–1	0–0
Örgryte IS	0–1	0–1	2–0	3–3	3–0	0–3	1–1	1–3	0–3	0–2		2–3
Östers IF	1–0	3–1	1–0	2–0	5–2	2–0	0–2	1–2	1–0	0–0	1–0	

Legend: Blue = home team win; Yellow = draw; Red = away team win.

== Allsvenskan play-offs ==
The 1990 Allsvenskan play-offs was the ninth and final edition of the competition. The four best placed teams from Allsvenskan qualified to the competition. Allsvenskan champions IFK Göteborg won the competition and the Swedish championship after defeating IFK Norrköping who finished as runners-up in the league.

=== Semi-finals ===
==== First leg ====
13 October 1990	Örebro	1–1	IFK Göteborg	Eyravallen, Örebro

13 October 1990	Öster	4–3	IFK Norrköping	Värendsvallen, Växjö

==== Second leg ====
21 October 1990	IFK Göteborg	2–1 (3–2 agg.)	Örebro	Ullevi, Gothenburg

20 October 1990	IFK Norrköping	(ag) 2–1 (5–5 agg.)	Öster	Idrottsparken, Norrköping

=== Final ===
28 October 1990	IFK Norrköping	0–3	IFK Göteborg	Idrottsparken, Norrköping

3 November 1990	IFK Göteborg	0–0 (3–0 agg.)	IFK Norrköping	Ullevi, Gothenburg

== Season statistics ==
=== Top scorers ===
Rank	Player	Club	Goals
1	(Sweden) Kaj Eskelinen	IFK Göteborg	10
2	(Sweden) Peter Skoog	Djurgårdens IF	8
2	(Sweden) Jan Hellström	IFK Norrköping	8
2	(Sweden) Kenneth Andersson	IFK Göteborg	8
2	(Sweden) Niclas Jönsson	Hammarby IF	8
2	(Sweden) Nicklas Karlström	Djurgårdens IF	8
2	(Sweden) Patrik Andersson	IFK Norrköping	8
8	(Sweden) Martin Dahlin	Malmö FF	7
8	(Sweden) Tomas Brolin	IFK Norrköping	7
8	(England) Steve Whitton	Halmstads BK	7
8	(Sweden) Hans Eklund	Östers IF	7
8	(Sweden) Tor Arne Fredheim	IFK Norrköping	7
8	(Sweden) Magnus Gustafsson	GAIS	7
8	(Sweden) Lasse Asp	Hammarby IF	7

== Attendances ==
#	Club	Average	Highest
1	IFK Göteborg	5,811	16,547
2	Örebro SK	5,496	8,694
3	AIK	5,014	18,948
4	GAIS	5,005	14,144
5	IFK Norrköping	4,666	8,843
6	Malmö FF	4,513	6,426
7	Halmstads BK	4,357	5,190
8	IK Brage	4,144	6,088
9	Djurgårdens IF	4,141	13,412
10	Hammarby IF	4,127	7,286
11	Östers IF	3,706	5,946
12	Örgryte IS	2,724	6,578
