= Magnus Samuelsson (footballer, born 1972) =

Swedish footballer

Personal information
- Full name: Per Magnus Samuelsson
- Date of birth: 15 April 1972 (age 54)
- Height: 1.75 m (5 ft 9 in)
- Position: Midfielder

Senior career*
Years	Team	Apps	(Gls)
1990–1998	IFK Norrköping		
1999–2001	FK Haugesund	43	(4)
2002–2006	IF Elfsborg		
2007–2009	IFK Norrköping		
- * Club domestic league appearances and goals

Magnus Samuelsson (born 15 April 1972) is a Swedish retired football midfielder.
