= Kenneth Bergqvist =

Swedish footballer

Personal information
- Date of birth: 2 September 1968 (age 58)
- Position: Defender

Senior career*
| Years | Team | Apps | (Gls) |
| 1988–1990 | Djurgårdens IF | 6 | (0) |
| 1991–1992 | Spånga IS | 52 | (1) |
| 1993–1997 | Djurgårdens IF | 112 | (5) |
| 1997– | Väsby IK | | |
- * Club domestic league appearances and goals

Kenneth Bergqvist (born 2 September 1968) is a Swedish former footballer. He made 48 Allsvenskan appearances for Djurgårdens IF and scored one goal.

== Career ==
Bergqvist joined the senior team of Djurgårdens IF in the 1988 season. In 1991, he joined Spånga IS For the 1993 season, he re-joined Djurgårdens IF from Spånga IS. In 1997, he left Djurgårdens IF for Väsby IK.
