= Nebojša Novaković =

Yugosalav footballer (born 1964)

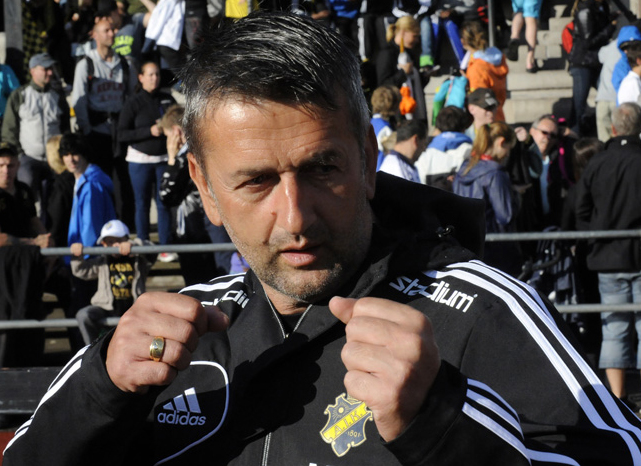
- Novaković as AIK manager in 2013

Personal information
- Date of birth: 29 October 1964 (age 61)
- Place of birth: Sarajevo, SFR Yugoslavia
- Position: Striker

Senior career*
Years	Team	Apps	(Gls)
1980–1984	Bratstvo Vojkovići		
1984–1988	Famos Hrasnica		
1988–1991	Dinamo Vinkovci	100	(18)
1991–1993	Vasalund	33	(19)
1993–1996	Djurgården	94	(46)
1997–2001	AIK	104	(27)
2002–2003	Väsby	3	(0)

Managerial career
- 2002–2003: Väsby (Assistant Manager)
- 2004–2008: AIK (Assistant Manager)
- 2009–2010: Sandefjord (Asst. Manager)
- 2011–2017: AIK (Assistant Manager)
- 2017: AIK (Manager of Youth Teams)
- 2018–2019: Vasalund
- * Club domestic league appearances and goals

Nebojša Novaković (Serbian Cyrillic: Небојша Новаковић, born 29 October 1964) is a former professional football player who played as a striker, most notably for AIK. He is the manager of Vasalunds IF. Born in Sarajevo, he moved to Sweden in the early 1990s.

== Biography ==
He was born 29 October 1964, in Sarajevo, SR Bosnia and Herzegovina, Yugoslavia to Bosnian Serb parents. He started his youth career at FK Bratstvo Vojkovići. He supported Red Star Belgrade as a youngster. He moved from Sarajevo in 1991, a year before the war broke out, to Solna, a suburb of Stockholm. He is nicknamed Nešo and Nebo.

=== Playing career ===
Novaković joined Vasalunds IF in 1991 and played 33 league matches (19 goals) for the team in the 1991 and 1992 season.

For the 1993 season, Novaković joined Djurgårdens IF and played 94 matches (46 goals) for the team between 1993 and 1997.

In AIK, he made 104 league appearances, scored 27 goals, won Allsvenskan in 1998 and played in the Champions League's 1999–2000 season, during which he scored a memorable lob versus FC Barcelona.

=== Coaching career ===
After his playing career he got the job as assistant manager in Väsby IK with Rikard Norling as manager. The club won league two consecutive seasons but did not manage to win any of the promotion qualifications. After the 2003 season he returned to AIK to be assistant manager to Richard Money. Money later resigned from AIK and got replaced by Patrick Englund, who got sacked after the 2004 season. Novakovic followed AIK and the new manager Rikard Norling to Superettan in 2005 due to their regulation. AIK won Superettan and reached for second place in Allsvenskan 2006. In 2008 the club got the fifth place and were a disappointment to many supporters. Rikard Norling got sacked and Novakovic resigned because of it. A few months later Novakovic and AIK negotiated to get him a new role in the club but outside the training staff, but they didn't get an agreement. Novakovic said that he's a coach and will continue his career as one.

On January 10, 2009 he became assistant manager to Patrick Walker in the Norwegian Tippeligaen club Sandefjord Fotball.

On December 16, 2010 he returned to AIK and signed a 3-year contract with the club as assistant manager together with the new manager Andreas Alm.

== Personal life ==
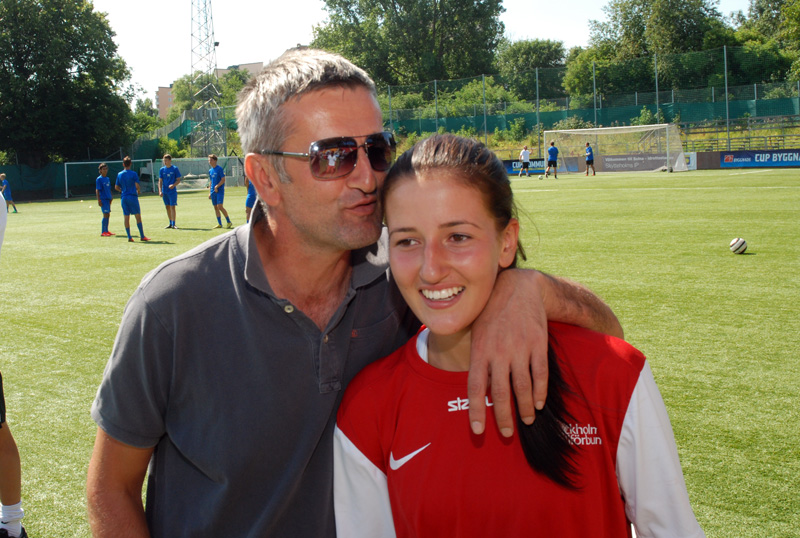
Novaković with Daniella in July 2013

He is married to Gordana, with whom he has a son, Dejan (born 1990) and daughter, Daniella (born 1996). Daniella is also a footballer in AIK's youth teams.

== Career statistics ==
Club	Season	Division	League		Cup		Europe		Total	
Club	Season	Division	Apps	Goals	Apps	Goals	Apps	Goals	Apps	Goals
Vasalund	1991	Division 1 Östra/Division 1 Norra	8	7			—			
Vasalund	1992	Division 1 Östra/Division 1 Norra	25	12			—			
Vasalund	Club totals		33	19			—			
Djurgården	1993	Division 1 Norra	25	19			—			
Djurgården	1994	Division 1 Norra	25	19			—			
Djurgården	1995	Allsvenskan	23	6			—			
Djurgården	1996	Allsvenskan	21	2			4	1		
Djurgården	Club totals		94	46			4	1		
AIK	1997	Allsvenskan	24	7	7	4	4	1	35	12
AIK	1998	Allsvenskan	25	5	4	4	—		29	9
AIK	1999	Allsvenskan	21	7	6	2	10	2	37	11
AIK	2000	Allsvenskan	18	4	4	2	3	1	25	7
AIK	2001	Allsvenskan	16	4	4	2	2	0	22	6
AIK	Club totals		104	27	25	14	19	4	148	45
Career totals							23	5		

== Honours ==
Djurgårdens IF

- Division 1 Norra : 1994

AIK

- Allsvenskan: 1998
- Svenska Cupen: 1996–97, 1998–99

Individual

- Swedish Goal of the Year: 1998
