= Lawrence Attard =

Maltese footballer

Personal information
- Date of birth: 6 June 1966 (age 60)
- Place of birth: Senglea, Malta
- Position: Defender

Youth career
- 1982: Għajn Dwieli
- Senglea Gunners

Senior career*
Years	Team	Apps	(Gls)
- Fgura United
1988–1991	Senglea Athletic	38	(2)
1991–2002	Hibernians	118	(12)
2002–2004	Senglea Athletic	49	(3)
2004–2005	Xewkija Tigers		

International career
1995–1997	Malta	16	(0)
- * Club domestic league appearances and goals

Lawrence Attard (born 6 June 1966) is a Maltese retired football defender.

== Club career ==
Attard played for hometown club Senglea Athletic and in the Maltese top tier for Hibernians. He was voted Malta Footballer of the Month in April 1995.

He also played for Gozitan side Xewkija Tigers.

== International career ==
Attard made his debut for Malta in an April 1995 European Championship qualification match away against Belarus and earned a total of 16 caps (no goals). His final international was a June 1997 World Cup qualification match away against the Faroe Islands.

== Honours ==
Hibernians

- Maltese Premier League: 1994, 1995, 2002
- Maltese FA Trophy: 1998
- Maltese Super Cup: 1994
