= Pogoń Oleśnica =

- Full name: Miejski Klub Sportowy Pogoń Oleśnica
- Nickname: Pogoniarze
- Founded: 12 May 1945; 80 years ago
- Ground: Stadion Miejski
- Capacity: 3,000
- Chairman: Jerzy Lipiński
- Manager: Grzegorz Graf
- League: Klasa A Wrocław III
- 2023–24: Klasa A Wrocław III, 3rd of 16

Pogoń Oleśnica is a Polish multi-sports club based in Oleśnica. It was founded in 1945. The team's official colors are white, blue and amaranth red. The club is best known for their football team that played at the second level of Polish association football during the 1994–95 season.

== History ==
The club was established on 12 May 1945 and is, therefore, the oldest Polish sports club in Lower Silesia. Originally called Kolejarz, the current name was adopted after a merger with Włókniarz by the end of 1955.

=== League history ===
In 1983, the Pogoń football team was promoted to the third division, where the club spent the next 6 seasons. Pogoń was relegated in 1989 but the team won promotion back to the third level one year later. In 1994, the club finished first in the third division winning promotion to the II liga.

During its only season at the second tier, Pogoń finished last out of 18 teams in the western group of the second division.

Pogoń went on to participate in the III liga until 2002, achieving mostly mid-table results. However, in the 2001–02 season, 12th place out of 18 teams wasn't enough to secure a place in the third division (Note: In 2001–02, teams ranked 10th and below were relegated from the Silesian group of the third division. This was due to the number of teams in second division being reduced from 20 to 18. Thus, six teams had to be relegated from the second level. At the end of the season, it turned out that 4 out of 6 of them were from the Silesian region, hence increasing the number of teams relegated from the third division.) and Pogoń was relegated to the fourth level. In 2007–08, Pogoń was ranked 6th and thus was moved to the new III liga. (Note: Since 2008–09, the unofficially called "new third division" (nowa III liga) has been the fourth level of association football in Poland.) There, the team played for the next two seasons. However, in September 2010, after participating in just 7 matches, the club withdrew, their results being annulled.

In 2011, Pogoń joined the regional league, the sixth level of association football in Poland, before being promoted to the IV liga, the fifth division, after just one season. The team played at the fifth level until relegation in 2018.

=== In the Polish Cup ===
The club's most notable result at the central level of the Polish Cup was achieved during the 1995–96 season. In the fall of 1995, having recently been relegated from the second division, Pogoń started the competition from its second round by eliminating Śląsk Wrocław, a top-tier team, 1–0 after extra time. In the third round, Pogoń won 1–0 against Ślęza Wrocław (second division) before eliminating Olimpia Poznań (top tier) 2–1 in the subsequent round. In the fifth round, the club managed to win against Lech Poznań, another top-level team, 1–0. In the spring of 1996, the quarterfinals were held. Pogoń beat yet another first division team, Górnik Zabrze, 1–0 after extra time. In the end, the team was eliminated in the semi-finals by Ruch Chorzów - the club that went on to win the cup that year.

Pogoń also managed to reach the 16th-finals or round of 32 in 2007.
