= Narcis Mohora =

Romanian footballer

Personal information
- Full name: Narcis Lucian Mohora
- Date of birth: 6 May 1971 (age 55)
- Place of birth: Galați, Romania
- Height: 1.80 m (5 ft 11 in)
- Positions: Central defender; defensive midfielder

Youth career
- CSȘ Galați
- CS Universitatea Craiova

Senior career*
Years	Team	Apps	(Gls)
1990–1993	Jiul Craiova		
1993–1995	Electroputere Craiova	67	(12)
1996	FC Universitatea Craiova	17	(0)
1996	Dinamo București	16	(1)
1997	Rapid București	14	(0)
1997	Farul Constanța	6	(1)
1998–1999	FC Universitatea Craiova	21	(0)
2000	Electro Bere Craiova	11	(4)
2000	Jiul Petroșani	5	(0)
2001	Drobeta-Turnu Severin	14	(2)
2001–2002	FSV Altmark Stendal	27	(1)
2002–2003	Electro Craiova		
Total		198	(21)
- * Club domestic league appearances and goals

Narcis Lucian Mohora (born 6 May 1971) is a Romanian former footballer who played as a defender. After he ended his playing career he worked as an assistant coach.

== Honours ==
Jiul Craiova

- Divizia C: 1990–91
