= Ivica Duspara =

Croatian footballer

Personal information
- Date of birth: 29 August 1965 (age 61)
- Place of birth: Vinkovci, SFR Yugoslavia
- Position: Midfielder

Senior career*
Years	Team	Apps	(Gls)
1983–1985	Dinamo Vinkovci	37	(2)
1986	Zadar	17	(6)
1986–1988	Dinamo Vinkovci	44	(10)
1988–1990	Osijek	30	(1)
1990–1991	Cibalia	26	(2)
1991–1992	HAŠK Građanski	24	(3)
1992	Segesta	6	(1)
1993–1995	FC Linz	67	(13)
1995–1997	LASK	55	(7)
1997–1998	Hrvatski Dragovoljac	18	(2)
1999–2000	Šibenik	12	(1)
Total		336	(48)

International career
- Yugoslavia U21
- * Club domestic league appearances and goals

Ivica Duspara (born 29 August 1965) is a Croatian retired football midfielder.
