= Samuel Remy =

Belgian footballer

Personal information
- Full name: Samuel Remy
- Date of birth: 23 October 1973 (age 53)
- Place of birth: Namur, Belgium
- Position: Midfielder

Youth career
- –1992: Wavre

Senior career*
Years	Team	Apps	(Gls)
1992–1999	Charleroi	123	(19)
1999	Vorwärts Steyr	5	(1)
2000–2005	Tubize	138	(43)
2005–2007	OH Leuven	57	(16)
2007–2008	Tubize	22	(5)
2008–2009	Wallonia Walhain		
- * Club domestic league appearances and goals as of 20 June 2012

Samuel Remy (born 23 October 1973) is a former Belgian professional footballer, who last played for Wallonia Walhain.

Remy played several seasons with Charleroi at the highest level of Belgian football, featuring in 123 games and scoring 19 goals. Thereafter he mainly played for Tubize and OH Leuven in the Belgian Second Division.
