= Bo Andersson (footballer) =

Swedish footballer and businessman

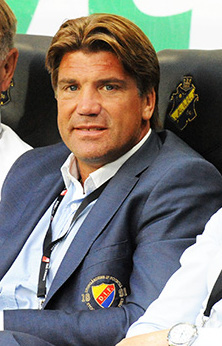
- Andersson in 2014

Personal information
- Full name: Bo Magnus Andersson
- Date of birth: 26 August 1968 (age 58)
- Position: Forward

Youth career
- 1976–1987: Rö IK

Senior career*
Years	Team	Apps	(Gls)
1988	BK Vargarna	19	(11)
1989	Väsby IK	17	(5)
1990–1991	AIK	33	(8)
1992–1993	Vasalund IF		
1994–1995	Djurgårdens IF	48	(35)
1995–1996	SC Braga	16	(4)
1996–1997	Djurgårdens IF	39	(6)
- * Club domestic league appearances and goals

Bo Magnus Andersson (born 26 August 1968), known as "Bosse" Andersson, or "Super-Bosse" is a Swedish businessman and former professional footballer who played as a forward. He is director of sports at Djurgårdens IF.

== Playing career ==
Andersson started his youth career in Rö IK. He played for BK Vargarna and Väsby IK before joining AIK for the 1990 season. At AIK, he made two seasons in Allsvenskan and made his Allsvenskan debut on 19 April 1990 in the 87th minute of the 2–1 home win against Halmstads BK. He then continued with two season in Vasalund IF.

Andersson signed with Djurgården for the 1994 season. In the 1994 and 1995 Djurgårdens IF seasons, he was the internal top scorer. He played with SC Braga during the 1995–96 season, before returning to Djurgården again for two seasons. At the age of 29, he had to end his active career in 1997 due to a knee injury.

== Post-playing career ==
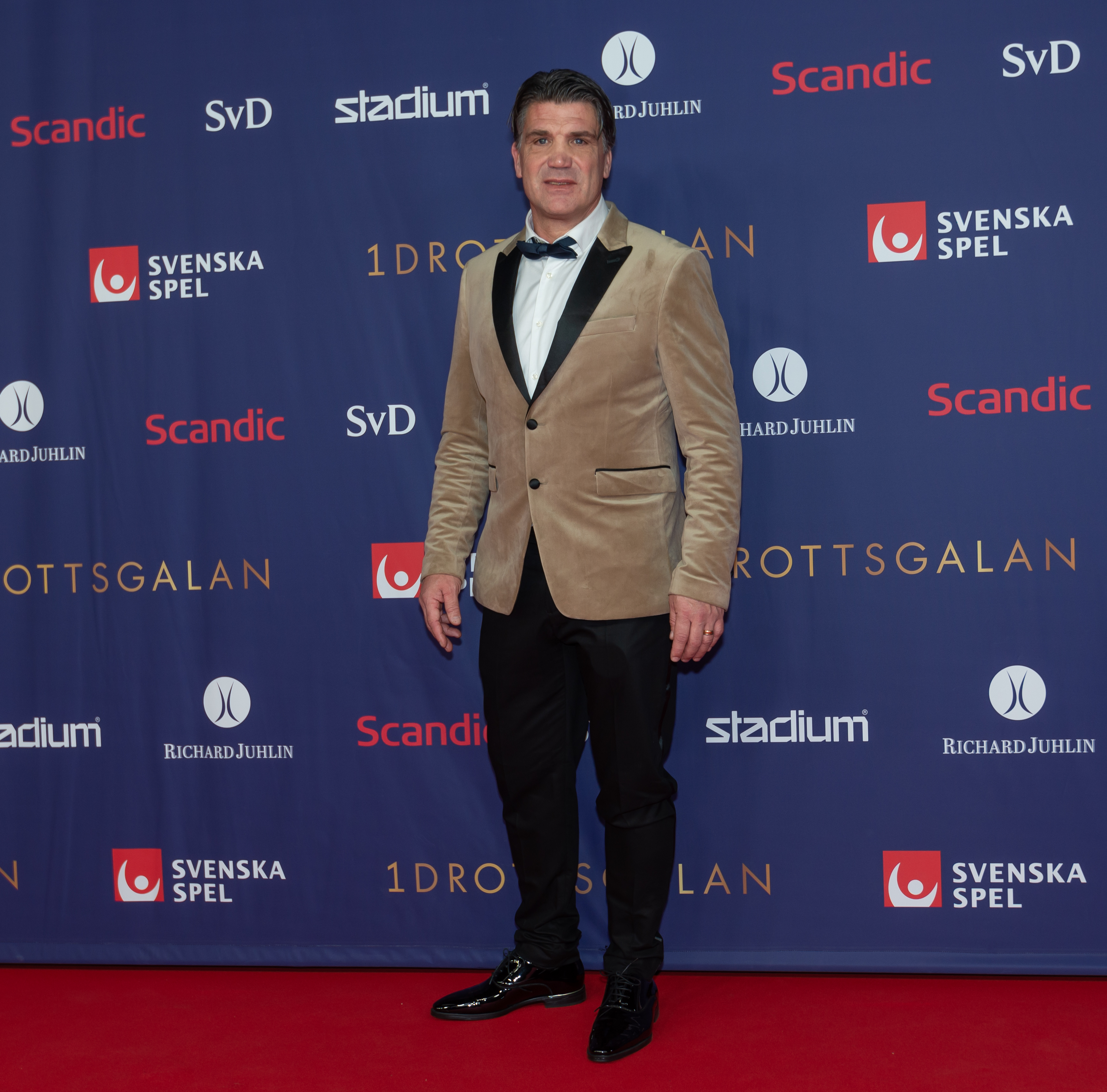
Bo Andersson in 2023

Same time as he quit his playing career, Andersson started working in the Djurgården organisation. Between 1999 and 2008, he was club director at Djurgårdens IF.

On 13 November 2013, he again became involved in Djurgården as director of sports, replacing acting director Anders Grönhagen. On 20 November 2013, Pelle Olsson was appointed as head coach for the team as a replacement for Per-Mathias Høgmo, who became coach for Norway men's national football team. In the beginning of December 2013, Henrik Berggren became acting CEO for the club. At the time of their entry, Djurgården was in bad shape financially and had been saved from bankruptcy by a member loan. In the year of 2013, Djurgården made a loss 27 million SEK compared to an equity of 10 million SEK.

During Andersson's years with Djurgården the results became better both sportingly and financially. Djurgården won the 2017–18 Svenska Cupen and the 2019 Allsvenskan.

Andersson's tenure at as director of sports for Djurgården has been described as being characterised by being reliant on Andersson's circle of contacts, tips from agents and voluntary scouts with high transfer incomes and low personnel costs. From 2013 to 2020, Djurgården sold players for about 300 million SEK, including Daniel Amartey, Erton Fejzullahu, Emil Bergström, Sam Johnson, Omar Colley, Michael Olunga, Magnus Eriksson, Othman El Kabir, Felix Beijmo, Tino Kadewere, Aliou Badji and Marcus Danielson. From 2013 to 2022, the club made a transfer netto of 189 million SEK. By 2022, Djurgården showed the second best equity of the 16 Allsvenskan team.

In 2023, he published an autobiography together with Marcus Birro.

== Personal life ==
Andersson worked as a policeman during the 1990s. One of his sons, David, is a goalkeeper in IFK Norrköping.

== Honours ==
=== Player ===
Djurgårdens IF

- Division 1 Norra: 1994

=== Director of football/sports ===
Djurgårdens IF

- Allsvenskan: 2002, 2003, 2005, 2019
- Svenska Cupen: 2002, 2004, 2005, 2017–18
- Superettan: 2000
