= Nikola Jokišić =

Yugoslav professional footballer (born 1971)

Personal information
- Date of birth: 7 February 1971 (age 55)
- Place of birth: Mostar, SFR Yugoslavia
- Height: 1.71 m (5 ft 7 1/2 in)
- Position: Winger

Senior career*
Years	Team	Apps	(Gls)
1988–1991	Velež Mostar	34	(3)
1991–1992	Vojvodina	0	(0)
1992–1993	Proodeftiki	26	(1)
1994	IFK Norrköping	4	(0)
1994	BK Häcken	1	(1)
1995	Linköpings FF	15	(4)
1995–1996	Dinamo București	0	(0)
1997–1999	União da Madeira	52	(13)
2000–2001	Ribeira Brava		
2001–2002	Machico	8	(0)
2003	Pécs	28	(7)
- * Club domestic league appearances and goals

Nikola Jokišić (born 7 February 1971) is a retired footballer who played as a forward for clubs in Yugoslavia, Greece, Sweden, Portugal and Hungary. He is a FIFA-licensed player's agent.

== Club career ==
Born in Mostar, SR Bosnia and Herzegovina, then still within Yugoslavia, Nikola Jokišić began playing football with FK Velež Mostar, making 34 appearances in the Yugoslav First League. He would also play for FK Vojvodina before moving abroad.

Nikola Jokišić joined Greek second division side Proodeftiki F.C. for the 1992–93 and 1993–94 seasons. In early 1994, he would play in the Swedish top division with IFK Norrköping and BK Häcken. He joined to Portuguese second division side C.F. União for two seasons, before moving to lower divisions of Portuguese football. In 2003, he played for Hungarian first division side Pécsi Mecsek FC.
