= Marek Jóźwiak =

Polish footballer (born 1967)

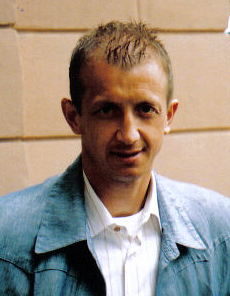

Personal information
- Date of birth: 21 August 1967 (age 59)
- Place of birth: Raciąż, Poland
- Height: 1.90 m (6 ft 3 in)
- Position: Defender

Youth career
- LZS Siemiątkowo

Senior career*
Years	Team	Apps	(Gls)
1984–1985	Błękitni Raciąż		
1985–1987	Mławianka Mława		
1987–1988	Śniardwy Orzysz		
1988–1996	Legia Warsaw	191	(3)
1996–2001	En Avant Guingamp	119	(6)
2001	Shenyang Haishi	4	(0)
2001–2005	Legia Warsaw	72	(1)
Total		386	(10)

International career
1992–1998	Poland	14	(0)
- * Club domestic league appearances and goals

Marek Jóźwiak (born 21 August 1967) is a Polish football pundit, executive and former professional player.

== Club career ==
Jóźwiak's first club was LZS Siemiątkowo, in the following years he was a player of the Błękitni Raciąż, Mławianka Mława and Śniardwy Orzysz.

In 1988, he joined Legia Warsaw, where he made 348 appearances in all competitions and scored a total of six goals. He won the Ekstraklasa title three times (1994, 1995, 2002), the Polish Cup four times (1989, 1990, 1994, 1995), the Polish Super Cup twice (1990, 1995) and the Polish League Cup once (2002). In the 1995–96 season, he participated in the UEFA Champions League. He scored the last goal for Legia in spring 2005 at the age of 37 and 60 days, which gives him the second place in the club's classification of the oldest scorers, behind Lucjan Brychczy.

He also played for the French EA Guingamp, where he won the Intertoto Cup in 1996, and the Chinese side Shenyang Jinde.

== International career ==
Jóźwiak made his debut for the Poland national team on 5 July 1992 in a friendly match against Guatemala. He played for Poland on 14 occasions.

== Post-playing career ==
After retiring from football in 2005, Jóźwiak remained in Legia's structures, where he held numerous scouting and directorial roles before leaving the club by mutual consent on 4 January 2013.

On 27 April 2015, another Ekstraklasa club Lechia Gdańsk announced the appointment of Jóźwiak as their new team manager and chief of scouting. In January 2016, his responsibilities were limited to only being responsible for the scouting department, before leaving the club in August 2017.

In early April 2019, Jóźwiak became a board advisor at Wigry Suwałki, before joining Wisła Płock as their new sporting director on 20 May that year. On 30 November 2020, he was sacked by Wisła's management board.

Two days later, on 2 December 2020, Jóźwiak joined Canal+ Poland's coverage team for Ekstraklasa and Ligue 1 games.

== Honours ==
Legia Warsaw

- Ekstraklasa: 1993–94, 1994–95, 2001–02
- Polish Cup: 1988–89, 1989–90, 1993–94, 1994–95
- Polish League Cup: 2001–02
- Polish Super Cup: 1989, 1994

Guingamp

- UEFA Intertoto Cup: 1996
