= Mirosław Kubisztal =

Polish footballer

Personal information
- Full name: Mirosław Józef Kubisztal
- Date of birth: 12 February 1962 (age 64)
- Place of birth: Tarnów, Poland
- Height: 1.78 m (5 ft 10 in)
- Position: Forward

Senior career*
Years	Team	Apps	(Gls)
1982–1984	Unia Tarnów		
1984	Cracovia	15	(3)
1985–1991	GKS Katowice	176	(38)
1991–1997	Örebro SK	148	(58)
1998–1999	Wolania Wola Rzędzińska		
2002	Dąbrovia Dąbrowa Tarnowska		
2006–2007	Skrzyszovia Skrzyszów		

International career
1989	Poland	1	(0)
- * Club domestic league appearances and goals

Mirosław Kubisztal (born 12 February 1962) is a Polish former professional footballer who played as a forward for Unia Tarnów, Cracovia, GKS Katowice, and Swedish club Örebro SK, where he played 161 matches and scored 68 goals. During his spell in Örebro, Kubisztal became very popular and known as Kuba which led to the Örebro SK fan club being named Kubanerna after him. He played one match for Poland national team.

== Honours ==
GKS Katowice

- Polish Cup: 1985–86, 1990–91
