= Kaj Eskelinen =

Swedish footballer

Personal information
- Full name: Kaj Matti Juhani Eskelinen
- Date of birth: 21 February 1969 (age 57)
- Positions: Midfielder; forward

Senior career*
Years	Team	Apps	(Gls)
1987–1989	Västra Frölunda IF	46	(14)
1990–1992	IFK Göteborg	48	(13)
1993	SK Brann	16	(6)
1994–1997	Djurgårdens IF	91	(34)
1998–2000	Hammarby IF	45	(15)
2001–2002	FC Café Opera	55	(19)
Total		301	(101)

International career
1984–1985	Sweden U17	18	(8)
1986	Sweden U19	4	(1)
1987–1989	Sweden U21	5	(2)
- * Club domestic league appearances and goals

Kaj Matti Juhani Eskelinen (born 21 February 1969) is a Swedish former footballer who played as a midfielder and forward. He was the Allsvenskan top scorer when his IFK Göteborg was crowned Swedish Champions in 1990.

== Playing career ==
Eskelinen played for Västra Frölunda IF, IFK Göteborg, SK Brann, Djurgårdens IF, Hammarby IF, and FC Café Opera during a career that spanned between 1987 and 2002. He was the Allsvenskan top scorer in 1990. He represented the Sweden U17, U19, and U21 teams a combined total of 27 times, scoring 11 goals.

== Personal life ==
He is of Finnish descent. His son William is also a footballer.

== Honours ==
IFK Göteborg

- Swedish Champion: 1990, 1991
- Svenska Cupen: 1991

Individual

- Allsvenskan top scorer: 1990
