= Rune Stakkeland =

Norwegian footballer (born 1973)

Personal information
- Date of birth: 27 June 1973 (age 53)
- Height: 1.65 m (5 ft 5 in)
- Position: Winger

Youth career
- Sandved
- Ulf/Sandnes

Senior career*
Years	Team	Apps	(Gls)
1992–1993	Ulf/Sandnes		
1994	Viking	17	(4)
1995	Bryne		
1996–1999	Lillestrøm	51	(5)
2012–2021	Bogafjell		

International career
1994–1995	Norway U21	17	(5)

Managerial career
- Bogafjell
- * Club domestic league appearances and goals

Rune Stakkeland (born 27 June 1973) is a Norwegian footballer who played as a winger. He played in Eliteserien for Viking and Lillestrøm as well as Norway U21, but had his career drastically cut short by injury.

== Career ==
Hailing from Sandnes, Stakkeland started his youth career in Sandved IL. He made his debut for Ulf/Sandnes in 1992. Standing at 1.65 metres, his playing style was that of a nimble technician. Coached by Tony Knapp, he made an immediate breakthrough and was wanted by Viking FK just four games into the 1992 season. Stakkeland was skeptical, fearing to "wither away" on the bench, and would wait out his opportunity.

Two seasons later, ahead of the 1994 season, Stakkeland did make the move to Viking. He was compared to the historical Viking player Isak Arne Refvik. He made his friendly debut already in November 1993, scoring Viking's sole goal. Stakkeland made his Eliteserien debut in April against Hamkam. In his third game, he entered in the 72nd minute, but completely dominated the rest of the game, scoring two goals to put Viking ahead 4–2.

His youth international debut came in 1994 for Norway U21. He became a key member of the team during the 1996 UEFA European Under-21 Championship qualification, where they would need to qualify to possibly proceed to the 1996 Summer Olympics as well. In the first qualification match against Belarus U21, Stakkeland scored. Later that year, Stakkeland took part in beating the Netherlands U21 at home.

Viking was hesitant to renew Stakkeland's one-year contract, to the dismay of the player who lost his motivation to stay in Viking, should a new contract be proposed. Despite four league goals, Stakkeland's time in Viking was over and he moved south to Bryne FK ahead of the 1995 season. U21 national team coach Nils Johan Semb was "concerned" that Stakkeland would not play at a high enough level.

While Stakkeland made his mark during Bryne's pre-season friendly matches, the season was seen as sub-par. After scoring his second goal in September, Stakkeland called Bryne's 1995 campaign "lacklustre". Having been wanted by Kongsvinger manager Per Brogeland, Brogeland later assumed the manager position at Lillestrøm SK. That club signed Stakkeland ahead of the 1996 season. He would play as a right winger.

A shin injury in 1996 worsened over time, allegedly because of failed surgeries. By 2000, Stakkeland's football career was over. He took up a multi-year struggle to receive insurance money for occupational injury. He sought a fee equivalent of ten years of footballer wages. The Supreme Court ruled against Stakkeland in 2004. He received some compensation, but not the complete desired sum.

== Personal life ==
He was nicknamed "Stakki". A devout Christian, Stakkeland was closely associated with Kristen Idrettskontakt. In August 1996, Stakkeland was verbally abused by an opponent on the field for his faith. The incident ended in the opponent apologizing.

He was married. After his football career endeed, he studied at BI Norwegian Business School.

Long after his retirement, Stakkeland returned as a hobby player in Bogafjell IL, a local Sandnes club in the Seventh Division. He eventually took up the position as coach, and secured promotion to the 2018 Fourth Division.
