= Goran Stanisavljević =

Serbian footballer (1964–2024)

Personal information
- Date of birth: 3 January 1964
- Place of birth: Boranci, SR Serbia, SFR Yugoslavia
- Date of death: 26 May 2024 (aged 60)
- Place of death: Austria
- Height: 1.77 m (5 ft 10 in)
- Position: Midfielder

Senior career*
Years	Team	Apps	(Gls)
–1990	Budućnost Titograd		
1990–1991	SAK Klagenfurt		
1991–1999	Ried		
1999–2000	Austria Lustenau	12	(1)
2004–2006	Schwarzenberg		
2006	Attnang	5	(0)
2007	Andorf	7	(0)

Managerial career
- 2000: Austria Lustenau
- 2006–2007: Attnang
- 2007–2009: Andorf
- 2011–2012: Hohenzell
- 2012–2013: Neumarkt/Pötting
- 2013–2014: Hohenzell
- * Club domestic league appearances and goals

Goran Stanisavljević (3 January 1964 – 26 May 2024) was a Serbian football player and manager. He died in Austria on 26 May 2024, at the age of 60.
