= Roman Janoušek (footballer) =

Czech footballer

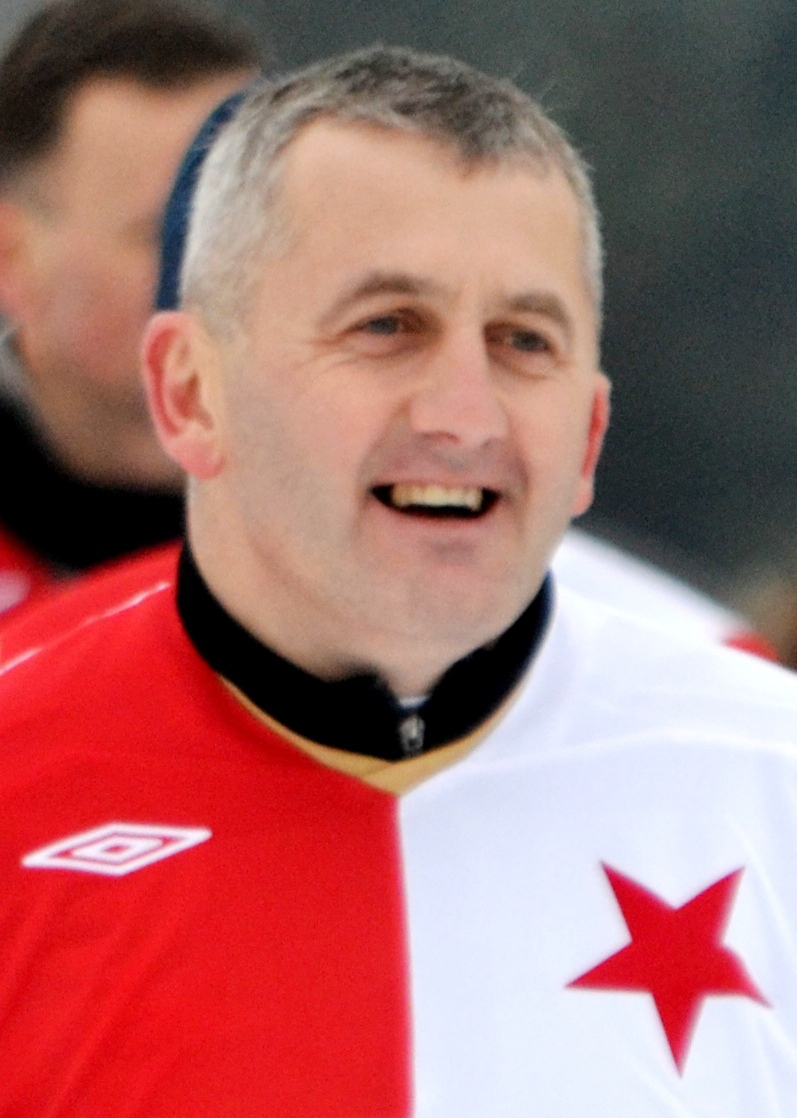

Personal information
- Date of birth: 30 August 1972 (age 54)
- Place of birth: Czechoslovakia
- Position: Midfielder

Senior career*
Years	Team	Apps	(Gls)
1990–1993	SK Hradec Králové		
1993–1994	SK Slavia Prague		
1993–1994	FC Slovan Liberec		
1994–1996	FC Viktoria Plzeň		
1995–1998	FC Kaučuk Opava		
1997–1998	FC Petra Drnovice		
1998–2000	Opava		
2000–2004	FK Viktoria Žižkov		
2004	SC Xaverov		
- * Club domestic league appearances and goals

Roman Janoušek (born 30 August 1972) is a Czech former football player. He played in the top flight of the Czech Republic, making more than 200 top-flight appearances spanning the existence of the Czechoslovak First League and the Gambrinus liga.

== Honours ==
=== Club ===
Viktoria Žižkov

- Czech Cup: 2000–01
