= Edmílson (footballer, born 1968) =

Brazilian footballer

Personal information
- Full name: Edmílson Paulo da Silva
- Date of birth: 16 April 1968 (age 58)
- Place of birth: Pernambuco, Brazil
- Position: Forward

Senior career*
Years	Team	Apps	(Gls)
1986–1991	Sport Recife		
1989	→ Sampaio Corrêa		
1991–1995	Seraing	136	(66)
1995–1996	Liège	29	(12)
1996	Botafogo-FR		
1996–2000	Standard Liège	36	(8)
1998	→ Apollon Limassol (loan)	6	(2)
1999	→ Oostende (loan)	10	(3)
2000	Botafogo-PB		
2000–2001	Trikala		
2001–2003	Géants Athois		
- * Club domestic league appearances and goals

Edmílson Paulo da Silva, or just Edmílson (born 16 April 1968) is a retired Brazilian footballer who played as a striker.

He is the father of Edmilson Junior Paulo da Silva, who was born in Liège while Edmílson Sr. played there.
