= Volodymyr Yaksmanytskyi =

Ukrainian footballer

Personal information
- Full name: Volodymyr Ivanovych Yaksmanytskyi
- Date of birth: 4 February 1977 (age 49)
- Place of birth: Zhdanov, Ukrainian SSR
- Height: 1.92 m (6 ft 4 in)
- Position: Defender

Youth career
- UOR Donetsk

Senior career*
Years	Team	Apps	(Gls)
1994–1999	Shakhtar-2 Donetsk	66	(6)
1995–1999	Shakhtar Donetsk	52	(3)
1998	→ Stal Alchevsk (loan)	2	(0)
1999–2004	Metalurh Donetsk	104	(10)
2001	→ Metalurh-2 Donetsk	2	(0)
2004–2006	Illichivets Mariupol	47	(1)
2006	Kryvbas Kryvyi Rih	15	(0)
2007–2008	Zorya Luhansk	13	(0)
Total		313	(20)

International career
1996–1998	Ukraine U21	11	(1)
- * Club domestic league appearances and goals

Volodymyr Ivanovych Yaksmanytskyi (Ukrainian: Володимир Іванович Яксманицький; born 4 February 1977) is a Ukrainian retired professional football defender.

== International career ==
From 1996 to 1998, he was a member of Ukraine national under-21 football team. In total he played eleven matches scoring one goal.

In 2002, he was called up to the Ukraine national football team and was included in the team's roster for a friendly match against Iran national football team on 21 August 2002, but was an unused substitute that day and was not subsequently invited to the senior national team.
