= Luan Zylfo =

Albanian football referee (1954–2000)

- Full name: Luan Zylfo
- Born: 11 September 1954; Albania
- Died: 13 May 2000 (aged 45); Tirana, Albania

Domestic
Years	League	
198x–2000	Albanian Superliga	

International
Years	League	Role
1996–2000	FIFA listed	Referee

Luan Zylfo (11 September 1954 – 13 May 2000) was an Albanian professional football referee. He was shot and killed on 13 May 2000 at a Kafene near the Selman Stërmasi Stadium, where he had earlier officiated a match between Partizani and Tomori. He was sitting with Tomori's president Adrian Çobo, assistant referee Shpëtim Lamçe, fourth official Albano Janku, commentator Dritan Shakohoxha and with the driver of the Albanian Football Association Agim Veshi. Gunmen opened fire on the group, killing both Zylfo and Çobo. Shortly after his death the national Referee Collegium in Tirana was named after Zylfo.
