= Svante Samuelsson =

Swedish footballer

Personal information
- Full name: Svante Lennart Samuelsson
- Date of birth: 4 September 1972 (age 54)
- Place of birth: Kungälv, Sweden
- Position: Midfielder

Senior career*
Years	Team	Apps	(Gls)
1988	Vallens IF	19	(4)
1989–1993	Kalmar FF	68	(7)
1994–1998	Örgryte IS	91	(7)
1998–2001	SK Brann	87	(7)
2002–2003	AIK	31	(1)
2004–2005	Kalmar FF	44	(3)

International career
2001	Sweden	2	(0)
- * Club domestic league appearances and goals

Svante Lennart Samuelsson (born 4 September 1972) is a Swedish former professional footballer who played as a midfielder. Beginning his career with Vallens IF in 1988, he went on to represent Kalmar FF, Örgryte IS, SK Brann, and AIK before retiring at Kalmar FF in 2005. He won two caps for the Sweden national team in 2001.
