= Christian Kellner =

Austrian footballer

Personal information
- Full name: Christian Kellner
- Date of birth: 22 November 1975 (age 50)
- Place of birth: Vienna, Austria
- Height: 1.78 m (5 ft 10 in)
- Position: Forward

Senior career*
| Years | Team | Apps | (Gls) |
| 1994–1995 | SR Donaufeld | 3 | (4) |
| 1995–1999 | Austria Wien | 53 | (3) |
| 1999–2002 | WSG Wattens | 57 | (13) |
| 2002–2003 | SPG Wattens/Wacker Tirol | 10 | (2) |
| 2003–2006 | WSG Wattens | 5 | (1) |
| 2006–2007 | SKN St. Pölten | 22 | (4) |
| 2007 | SV Horn | 15 | (16) |
| 2007–2009 | WSG Wattens | 52 | (28) |
| 2009–2011 | SC Schwaz | 22 | (19) |
| 2011 | SVG Reichenau | 13 | (5) |
| 2011–2014 | SV Absam | | |
- * Club domestic league appearances and goals

Christian Kellner (born 22 November 1975) is a former Austrian association football player who played at the forward position.
