= Peter Knudsen (footballer, born 1970) =

Danish footballer

Personal information
- Date of birth: 16 July 1970 (age 56)
- Position: Midfielder

Senior career*
Years	Team	Apps	(Gls)
1990–2001	Silkeborg IF		

Managerial career
- 2006–2007: Silkeborg IF
- 2007: Silkeborg IF (assistant)
- 2009–2010: AC Horsens (assistant)
- * Club domestic league appearances and goals

Peter Knudsen (born 16 July 1970) is a Danish retired football midfielder.

== Honours ==
Silkeborg

- Danish Superliga: 1993–94
- UEFA Intertoto Cup: 1996
