= Jari Vanhala =

Finnish footballer (born 1965)

Personal information
- Date of birth: 29 August 1965 (age 61)
- Place of birth: Helsinki, Finland
- Height: 1.80 m (5 ft 11 in)
- Position: Striker

Senior career*
Years	Team	Apps	(Gls)
1983–1990	Grankulla IFK	153	(69)
1991	FF Jaro	33	(19)
1992–1994	HJK	78	(22)
1995–1996	FF Jaro	50	(27)
1996–1997	Bradford City	1	(0)
1997–1998	FinnPa	45	(9)
1999	Inter Turku	15	(3)
2000	Grankulla IFK	0	(0)
Total		375	(149)

International career
1992–1997	Finland	23	(2)
- * Club domestic league appearances and goals

Jari Vanhala (born 29 August 1965) is a Finnish former footballer who played at both professional and international levels as a striker.

== Club career ==
Born in Helsinki, Vanhala spent the majority of his playing career in Finland, playing with Grankulla IFK, FF Jaro, HJK, FinnPa, and Inter Turku. However, he also made one substitute appearance in the Football League for Bradford City during the 1996–97 season, playing for 18 minutes.

== International career ==
Between 1992 and 1997, Vanhala earned 23 caps for the Finnish national side, scoring two goals, including appearing in five FIFA World Cup qualifying matches.
