= Marius Coporan =

Romanian footballer

Personal information
- Full name: Marius Mihai Coporan
- Date of birth: 13 December 1975 (age 50)
- Place of birth: Drăgănești-Vlașca, Romania
- Height: 1.87 m (6 ft 2 in)
- Positions: Right midfielder; right back; central midfielder

Senior career*
Years	Team	Apps	(Gls)
1993–1997	Dinamo București	40	(4)
1997	Altay Izmir	3	(0)
1998	Steaua București	21	(0)
1999	Dinamo București	9	(0)
2000	Juventus București	15	(5)
2000	ARO Câmpulung	7	(1)
2001	Juventus București	7	(2)
2001–2004	Inter Gaz București	59	(7)
Total		161	(19)

International career
1993	Romania U18	2	(0)
1996	Romania U21	1	(0)
- * Club domestic league appearances and goals

Marius Mihai Coporan (born 13 December 1975) is a Romanian former footballer who played as a midfielder and defender.

== Honours ==
Steaua București

- Divizia A: 1997–98
- Cupa României: 1998–99
- Supercupa României: 1998

Dinamo București

- Divizia A: 1999–00
- Cupa României: 1999–00
