= Carlos Banda (footballer, born 1977) =

Swedish former footballer

Personal information
- Full name: Carlos Antonio Banda Campos
- Date of birth: 28 March 1977 (age 49)
- Height: 1.80 m (5 ft 11 in)
- Position: Defender

Youth career
- IFK Österåker

Senior career*
Years	Team	Apps	(Gls)
1996–1999	Djurgårdens IF	21	(0)
2002–2007	Jönköpings Södra IF		
2007	Syrianska FC		
2007–2008	Gröndals IK		
- * Club domestic league appearances and goals

Carlos Antonio Banda Campos (born 23 August 1977) is a Swedish former footballer who played as a defender.

Banda started his career in IFK Österåker. He joined Djurgårdens IF in 1996 and made three Allsvenskan appearances for them. He remained at Djurgården until 1999. He then spent five years at Jönköpings Södra IF. He also played for Syrianska FC and Gröndals IK.

Banda's cousin Carlos Banda is a football manager and has coached Djurgården.

== Honours ==
Djurgårdens IF

- Division 1 Norra: 1998
