= Đorđe Inđić =

Bosnian Serb footballer and manager

Personal information
- Full name: Đorđe Inđić
- Date of birth: 1 March 1975 (age 51)
- Place of birth: Banja Luka, SR Bosnia and Herzegovina, SFR Yugoslavia
- Height: 1.82 m (6 ft 0 in)
- Position: Midfielder

Senior career*
| Years | Team | Apps | (Gls) |
- Borac Banja Luka
| 1996–2001 | Zemun | 89+ | (14) |
| 2001–2003 | Maribor | 16 | (2) |
| 2003–2004 | Chornomorets Odesa | 4 | (0) |
| 2004–2005 | Spartak-Horobyna Sumy | 12 | (1) |
| 2005–2007 | in France | | |
| 2007–2008 | Laktaši | 11 | (1) |
- Borac Banja Luka
| 2008–2009 | Sloboda Mrkonjić Grad | 20 | (4) |

Managerial career
- 2014: Sloboda Mrkonjić Grad
- * Club domestic league appearances and goals

Đorđe Inđić (Serbian Cyrillic: Ђорђе Инђић, born 1 March 1975) is a Bosnian football manager and former player that played as midfielder. He is an ethnich Serb.

== Playing career ==
=== Club ===
During his career he played with Bosnian clubs FK Borac Banja Luka, FK Laktaši and FK Sloboda Mrkonjić Grad, Serbian FK Zemun, Slovenian NK Maribor, Ukrainian FC Chernomorets Odesa and FC Spartak Sumy and in France.

== Managerial career ==
After retiring he became coach, and by August 2014 he was coaching FK Sloboda Mrkonjić Grad in the First League of the Republika Srpska.
