= 2004–05 FC Aarau season =

FC Aarau
2004–05 season
- Owner: FC Aarau AG
- Club president: Michael Hunziker
- Head-coach: André Egli
- Stadium: Stadion Brügglifeld, Aarau
- 2004–05 Super League: 8th of 10
- 2004–05 Swiss Cup: Semi-final
- Top goalscorer: League: Rainer Bieli and Gaetano Giallanza (both 9); All: Rainer Bieli (13)

The 2004–05 season was FC Aarau's 102nd season in their existence, since their foundation in 1902. It was their twenty-third season in the top-tier of Swiss football, following their promotion at the end of 1980–81 season.

== Overview ==
The public limited company (Aktiengesellschaft) of FC Aarau was founded on 7 January 2003. It is responsible for the professional football operations of the first team in the Challenge League, as well as for high-performance football within the youth sector. At the AGM in May of that year, Michael Hunziker was re-elected for his third season as FCA club president. Dr.iur. Michael Hunziker is a Swiss attorney-at-law and notary. The club did not prolong the contract with last season's head-coach Martin Rueda, instead this contract ran out in August and the club then appointed André Egli as new head-coach.

The club had long earnt their nickname the unrelegatable due to the fact that since the 1998–99 season they had contineously ended the league season in the relegation zone but had always saved themselves in extremis, especially noteworthy here is the 2001–02 season as they ended the season on a relegation slot, but remained in top-tier via the green table. In the previous season they had also only escaped relegation by two points in a very tight endphase.

The FCA first team competed in this season's domestic first-tier, the 2004–05 Super League, with the clear intention of retaining their top-tier status. The team also competed in the 2004–05 Swiss Cup and here the aim was to stay in the competition as kong as possible. The FCA team had not qualified for the UEFA European competitions and they did not enter the Intertoto Cup.

FCA played their home games in the Stadion Brügglifeld and the stadium is located on the southern outskirts of Aarau, in the territory of the neighboring municipality of Suhr. The stadium is about one and a half kilometers from Aarau city center and the railway station.

== Players ==
The following is the list of the FCA first team squad this season. It also includes players that were in the squad the day the domestic league season started, on 17 July 2004, but subsequently left the club after that date.

Note: Flags indicate national team as defined under FIFA eligibility rules; some limited exceptions apply. Players may hold more than one non-FIFA nationality.

No.	Pos.	Nation	Player
1	GK	SUI	Oliver Stöckli (league games: 10)
18	GK	SUI	Swen König (league games: 0)
23	GK	SUI	Massimo Colomba (league games: 21)
28	GK	SUI	Roman Rudolf (league games: 3)
2	DF	SUI	Flavio Schmid (league games: 18)
3	DF	ITA	Davide Moretto (league games: 11)
4	DF	ARM	Harutyun Vardanyan (league games: 16)
5	DF	SUI	Sven Christ (league games: 17)
12	DF	BRA	Paulo Menezes (league games: 34)
16	MF	ITA	Fernando Ferrari (league games: 4)
19	DF	CAM	Jean-Pierre Tcheutchoua (league games: 19)
21	DF	SUI	Arnaud Bühler (league games: 33)
24	DF	SUI	Matteo Vanetta (league games: 22)
6	MF	SUI	Roland Bättig (league games: 25)

No.	Pos.	Nation	Player
8	MF	MKD	Argjend Beqiri (league games: 18)
10	MF	CAM	Augustine Simo (league games: 20)
11	MF	ESP	Carlos Varela (league games: 21)
14	MF	BDI	David Opango (league games: 25)
17	MF	SUI	Manuel Schenker (league games: 25)
20	MF	SUI	Gökhan Inler (league games: 14)
25	MF	SUI	Dany Bolliger (league games: 1)
26	MF	SUI	Sehar Fejzulahi (league games: 14)
30	MF	SUI	Cyrill Hasler (league games: 7)
7	FW	SUI	Gaetano Giallanza (league games: 27)
9	FW	SUI	Rainer Bieli (league games: 31)
15	FW	SUI	David Sesa (league games: 3)
22	FW	SUI	Slaviša Dugić (league games: 19)
27	FW	SUI	Gezim Sadiku (league games: 2)

Players who joined the squad

The following is the list of players that joined the FCZ first team squad in the off or pre-season or during the winter-break transfer window. It also includes players that advanced from the youth team during the season and achieved at least one domestic league appearence.

Note: Flags indicate national team as defined under FIFA eligibility rules; some limited exceptions apply. Players may hold more than one non-FIFA nationality.

No.	Pos.	Nation	Player
6	MF	SUI	Roland Bättig (from Xamax)
8	MF	MKD	Argjend Beqiri (from Sloga Jugomagnat)
25	MF	SUI	Dany Bolliger (advanced from youth team)
22	FW	SUI	Slaviša Dugić (from Servette)
26	MF	SUI	Sehar Fejzulahi (on loan from Basel youth)
16	MF	ITA	Fernando Ferrari (from Vaduz)
7	FW	SUI	Gaetano Giallanza (from Young Boys)
20	MF	SUI	Gökhan Inler (from Basel youth)

No.	Pos.	Nation	Player
28	GK	SUI	Roman Rudolf (advanced from youth team)
27	FW	SUI	Gezim Sadiku (from Basel youth)
17	MF	SUI	Manuel Schenker (advanced from youth team)
15	MF	SUI	David Sesa (from Napoli)
10	MF	CAM	Augustine Simo (from Zürich)
1	GK	SUI	Oliver Stöckli (from Concordia Basel)
4	DF	ARM	Harutyun Vardanyan (from Servette)

Players who left the squad

The following is the list of the FCA first team players that left the squad during the previous season or in the off-season, before the new domestic season began. Note: Flags indicate national team as defined under FIFA eligibility rules; some limited exceptions apply. Players may hold more than one non-FIFA nationality.

No.	Pos.	Nation	Player
—	DF	SUI	Marco Walker (to Mainz 05)
—	DF	SUI	Stephan Keller (on loan to Aarau)
—	DF	SUI	Gerardo Seoane (to Grasshopper Club)
—	DF	SUI	Luca Denicolà (returned to Grasshopper Club after loan)
—	DF	BRA	Zé Luís (returned to Uerdingen 05 after loan)
—	DF	BRA	Alexandre de Freitas (to YF Juventus)
—	MF	POL	Marek Citko (to Cracovia)

No.	Pos.	Nation	Player
—	MF	SRB	Borko Marinkovic (to Víkingur Reykjavík)
—	MF	SUI	Alain Schultz (to Wohlen)
—	MF	BEN	Alain Gaspoz (to Sion)
—	FW	SUI	Patrick De Napoli (to Young Boys)
—	FW	GHA	Charles Wittl (to La Chaux-de-Fonds)
—	FW	GEO	Mikheil Kavelashvili (to Basel)

== Results ==
Legend

Win Draw Loss Postponed

=== Super League ===
==== First half of season ====
The Super League started on 17 July 2004 and the first half was to be completed on 11 December, then came the winter break. The league season was originally contested by ten teams.

17 July 2004 Round 1	Basel	6–0	Aarau	St. Jakob-Park, Basel
19:30	Yakin 17' (pen.); Smiljanić 38' (2:0); Giménez 45' (3:0); Chipperfield (yellow card) 46'; Cantaluppi 53' (pen.) (Moretto) 61' (o.g.); P. Degen (yellow card) 67'; Chipperfield 74' (6:0)	FCB summary FCA summary	(yellow card) 19' Vardanyan; (yellow card) 25' (yellow-red card) 33' Christ; (yellow card) 90+3' Opango	Attendance: 24,430; Referee: (Switzerland) Guido Wildhaber (Kerzers)
Note: FCB without Ergic (was ill) and Carignano (a non-EU player who is surplus to requirements); Aarau without Bättig, Giallanza, Hasler and Simo (all injured), Bekiri (not yet eligible to play), as well as Bühler, Dugic and König (all away for the U19 European Championship). 15th minute: A shot by Smiljanic grazes the top of the crossbar. 85th minute: FCA goalkeeper Colomba deflected a shot from Degen onto the post. Super League debut for FCA youth player Dany Bolliger (18).

23 July 2004 Round 2	Aarau	P–P	Thun	Stadion Brügglifeld, Aarau
19:30		FCA summary
Note: Match was postponed and scheduled for the following Tuesday.

27 July 2004 Round 2	Aarau	0–1	Thun	Stadion Brügglifeld, Aarau
19:30	Beqiri (yellow card) 27'	FCA summary	67' (0:1) Baykal; (yellow card) 84' Aegerter; (yellow card) 88' Zanni	Attendance: 5,000; Referee: (Switzerland) Nicole Petignat (Courgenay)
Note: Originally scheduled for Friday 23 July, this match was rescheduled.

31 July 2004 Round 3	Xamax	2–1	Aarau	Stade de la Maladière, Neuchâtel
19:30	Baumann 23' (1:1); Cordonnier (yellow card) 32'; Margairaz 47' (2:1); Rey (yellow card) 90+1'	FCA summary	2' (0:1) Menezes; (yellow card) 70' Bieli	Attendance: 4,200; Referee: (Switzerland) René Rogalla (Wallisellen)

7 August 2004 Round 4	Aarau	4–0	Servette	Stadion Brügglifeld, Aarau
19:30	(Alicarte) 14' (o.g.); Christ (yellow card) 30'; Bieli (yellow card) 34'; Bättig (yellow card) 72'; Dugić 79' (2:0); Beqiri 80' (3:0); Varela 88' (4:0)	FCA summary	(yellow card) 1' Alicarte; (yellow card) 10' Kata; (red card) 66' Hassli	Attendance: 4,150; Referee: (Switzerland) Massimo Busacca (Monte Carasso/Bellinzona)

14 August 2004 Round 5	Zürich	1–3	Aarau	Letzigrund, Zürich
19:30	Petrosyan 34' (pen.); Ilie (yellow card) 34'	FCZ summary FCA summary	(yellow card) 16' Varela; 22' (0:1) Bieli; (yellow card) 34' Bühler; (yellow card) 69' Bättig; 78' (1:2) Bieli; 81' (1:3) Dugić; (yellow card) 89' Vardanyan	Attendance: 9,200; Referee: (Switzerland) Philippe Leuba (Chexbres)

21 August 2004 Round 6	Aarau	1–3	Young Boys	Stadion Brügglifeld, Aarau
19:30	Bieli (yellow card) 14'; Giallanza 17' (pen.); Christ (yellow card) 19'; Giallanza (yellow card) 76'	FCA summary	13' (0:1) Rochat; (yellow card) 17' Rochat; (yellow card) 26' Melunović; 50' (1:2) Urdaneta; (yellow card) 64' Urdaneta; 70' (1:3) Chapuisat; (yellow card) 79' Bettoni	Attendance: 5,400; Referee: (Switzerland) Florian Etter

28 August 2004 Round 7	Schaffhausen	3–3	Aarau	Stadion Breite, Schaffhausen
17:30	Senn 11' (1:1); Fernando (yellow card) 29'; Franciel 49' (2:2); Truckenbrod (yellow card) 61'; Ademi 84' (3:3)	FCA summary	8' (0:1) Varela; 31' (1:2) Giallanza; (yellow card) 41' Vanetta; 64' (2:3) Giallanza; (yellow card) 74' Opango	Attendance: 2,850; Referee: (Switzerland) René Rogalla (Wallisellen)

11 September 2004 Round 8	Aarau	4–1	St. Gallen	Stadion Brügglifeld, Aarau
19:30	Bühler 22' (1:0); Varela (yellow card) 31'; Simo 49' (2:1); Bieli 78' (3:1); Bieli 84' (4:1)	FCA summary	(yellow card) 21' Jenny; 25' (pen.) Akwuegbu	Attendance: 5,900; Referee: (Switzerland) Markus Nobs (Wohlen bei Bern)

22 September 2004 Round 9	Grasshopper Club	1–1	Aarau	Hardturm, Zürich
19:30	Rogério (red card) 8'; Núñez 40' (1:0); Mitreski (yellow card) 43'; Lichtsteiner (yellow card) 43'	FCA summary	(yellow card) 33' Bättig; (yellow card) 39' Vanetta; 66' (1:1) Giallanza; (yellow card) (yellow-red card) 76' Vanetta	Attendance: 5,100; Referee: (Switzerland) Guido Wildhaber (Kerzers)

25 September 2004 Round 10	Aarau	1–0	Basel	Stadion Brügglifeld, Aarau
19:30	Varela 6' (1:0); Varela (yellow card) 68'; Opango (yellow card) 70'	FCB summary FCA summary	(yellow card) 15' Degen; (yellow card) 35' Kléber	Attendance: 7,200; Referee: (Switzerland) Carlo Bertolini (Vira-Gambarogno)
Note: FCA without Vanetta (suspended), Moretto and Tcheutchoua (both injured). FCB without Philipp Degen (suspended), Carignano, Chipperfield (both injured) and Ergic (longterm illness). 23rd minute, a shot from David Degen hit the underside of the crossbar and bounced clear. 24th minute, a goal by Mesbah was disallowed for offside. 92nd minute, a shot from David Degen hit the post.

3 October 2004 Round 11	Thun	0–0	Aarau	Stadion Lachen, Thun
16:15	Bellusci (yellow card) 8'	FCA summary	(yellow card) 46' Opango; (yellow card) 55' Bättig	Attendance: 5,100; Referee: (Switzerland) Nicole Petignat (Courgenay)

16 October 2004 Round 12	Aarau	0–0	Xamax	Stadion Brügglifeld, Aarau
19:30		FCA summary	(yellow card) 68' Ielsch	Attendance: 5,000; Referee: (Switzerland) Markus Nobs (Wohlen bei Bern)
Note: FCA without Opango (suspended). 37th minute, Xamax defender Joel Griffiths substituted out injured.

30 October 2004 Round 13	Servette	1–0	Aarau	Stade de Genève, Lancy
19:30	Kata (yellow card) 73'; Merino (yellow card) 74'; Merino 78' (1:0); Karembeu (yellow card) 85'	FCA summary	(yellow card) 29' Christ; (yellow card) 34' Vardanyan; (yellow card) 55' Bättig; (yellow card) 65' (yellow-red card) 89' Varela	Attendance: 6,827; Referee: (Switzerland) René Rogalla (Wallisellen)

7 November 2004 Round 14	Aarau	3–1	Zürich	Stadion Brügglifeld, Aarau
16:15	Bieli 11' (1:0); Bieli (yellow card) 14'; Christ (yellow card) 16'; Giallanza 26' (2:0); Stahel 62' (o.g.)	FCZ summary FCA summary	(yellow card) 13' Petrosyan; (yellow card) 66' Filipescu; (yellow card) 70' Stahel; 74' (3:1) Ilie	Attendance: 5,100; Referee: (Switzerland) Claudio Circhetta (Muttenz)
Note: FCA without Varela (suspended).

14 November 2004 Round 15	Young Boys	1–1	Aarau	Stadion Neufeld, Bern
14:30	Disler (yellow card) 74'; Chapuisat 90+4' (pen.)	FCA summary	14' (pen.) Giallanza; (yellow card) 24' Beqiri; (yellow card) 30' Opango; (yellow card) 33' Bättig; (yellow card) 66' Schmid; (yellow card) 74' Varela; (yellow card) 80' Bühler; (yellow card) (yellow-red card) 89' Schenker	Attendance: 6,800; Referee: (Switzerland) Philippe Leuba (Chexbres)
Note: The Young Boys played their home games in the Stadion Neufeld after the Wankdorf Stadium was demolished in 2001 and the new Stadion Wankdorf was constructed on the same site.

28 November 2004 Round 16	Aarau	2–1	Schaffhausen	Stadion Brügglifeld, Aarau
14:30	Opango (yellow card) 35'; Giallanza 36' (1:1); Menezes 51' (2:1)	FCA summary	(yellow card) 28' Bunjaku; 30' (0:1) Truckenbrod; (yellow card) 30' (yellow-red card) 73' Tsawa	Attendance: 4,700; Referee: (Switzerland) Reto Rutz (Amriswil)

5 December 2004 Round 17	St. Gallen	2–1	Aarau	Espenmoos, St. Gallen
16:00	Jenny (yellow card) 48'; Merenda 65' (1:1); Fabinho (yellow card) 67'; Pavlović (yellow card) 80'; Imhof (yellow card) 86' (Vanetta) 88' (og 2:1); Akwuegbu (yellow card) 90'	FCA summary	40' (0:1) Christ	Attendance: 8,000; Referee: (Switzerland) Jérôme Laperrière (Kerzers)

12 December 2004 Round 18	Aarau	1–2	Grasshopper Club	Stadion Brügglifeld, Aarau
16:15	Simo (yellow card) 25'; Bättig (yellow card) 66'; Menezes 87' (1:2)	FCA summary	(yellow card) 21' Salatić; (yellow card) 26' Touré; (yellow card) 64' Stepanovs; 66' (0:1) Núñez; (yellow card) 67' Núñez; 78' (0:2) Touré; (yellow card) (yellow-red card) 84' Stepanovs	Attendance: 5,000; Referee: (Switzerland) Massimo Busacca (Monte Carasso/Bellinzona)

==== Second half of season ====
On 4 February 2005 the parent company of Servette FC was declared bankrupt. It had run debts of over 10 million Swiss francs, having not paid the players since the previous November, and consequently the club suffered an exodus of players looking for paying clubs. As a consequence of the bankruptcy Servette FC had their license revoked, the club's second half matches were entirely cancelled. The second half of the season was therefore competed with only nine clubs. These each played another double round-robin. Each of the nine clubs had played 34 matches at the end of the season. This stage started on 20 February and the season was completed on 29 May.

20 February 2005 Round 19	Aarau	1–2	Xamax	Stadion Brügglifeld, Aarau
14:30	Vanetta 58' (1:1); Giallanza (yellow card) 69'; Schenker (yellow card) 72'; Fejzulahi (yellow card) 90+1'	FCA summary	(yellow card) 4' Mangane; 17' (0:1) M'Futi; (yellow card) 29' Griffiths; (yellow card) 37' Soufiani; (yellow card) 45' Ielsch; (yellow card) 60' Zambaz; (yellow card) 89' Baumann; 90+2' Ielsch	Attendance: 4,200; Referee: (Switzerland) Nicole Petignat (Courgenay)

27 February 2005 Round 20	Schaffhausen	P–P	Aarau	Stadion Breite, Schaffhausen
		FCA summary
Note: Match postponed due to bad weather and scheduled for 9 March 2005.

2 March 2005 Round 21	Aarau	P–P	Zürich	Stadion Brügglifeld, Aarau
		[ FCZ summary] FCA summary
Note: The match was postponed and rescheduled to the 6 April 2005 due to bad weather.

6 March 2005 Round 22	Young Boys	P–P	Aarau	Stadion Neufeld, Bern
		FCA summary

9 March 2005 Round 20	Schaffhausen	P–P	Aarau	Stadion Breite, Schaffhausen
		FCA summary

13 March 2005 Round 23	Aarau	Cancelled	Servette	Stadion Brügglifeld, Aarau
		FCA summary

16 March 2005 Round 24	St. Gallen	0–0	Aarau	Espenmoos, St. Gallen
19:30	Wolf (yellow card) 61' (yellow-red card) 64'; Callà (yellow card) 70'	FCA summary	(yellow card) 31' Bättig; (yellow card) 54' Opango; (yellow card) 89' Simo	Attendance: 7,000; Referee: (Switzerland) Bruno Grossen

20 March 2005 Round 25	Aarau	2–3	Grasshopper Club	Stadion Brügglifeld, Aarau
14:30	Giallanza 32' (1:2); Bieli 74' (2:2)	FCA summary	3' (0:1) Lichtsteiner; 15' (0:2) Muff; (yellow card) 73' Stepanovs; 90+2' (2:3) Cabanas	Attendance: 6,500; Referee: (Austria) Fritz Stuchlik
Note: This match was played as part of the interaction referee exchange between the Swiss Football Association and the Austrian Football Association. FCA mid-fielder Gökhan Inler played his professional debut.

2 April 2005 Round 26	Basel	4–2	Aarau	St. Jakob-Park, Basel
19:30	Huggel 49' (1:2); Giménez 50' (2:2); Carignano 53' (3:2); Carignano (yellow card) 53'; Zanni (yellow card) 60'; Zanni 62' (4:2)	FCB summary FCA summary	22' (0:1) Menezes; 39' (0:2) Giallanza	Attendance: 24,393; Referee: (Switzerland) Carlo Bertolini (Vira-Gambarogno)
Note: FCB without Chipperfield (suspended), as well as Petric and Yakin (both injured). FCA without Bekiri, Christ, Colomba, König, Schenker, Schmid, Simo and Wardanjan (all injured), along with Bättig (suspended). A minute of silence was observed for the late former FCB president and national team delegate, Harry Thommen. 50th minute, a shot from Carignano struck the crossbar and Gimenez scored from the rebound to make it 2–2. 61st minute, Carignano left the pitch due to injury. 63rd minute, a shot from David Degen hit the post.

6 April 2005 Round 21	Aarau	2–3	Zürich	Stadion Brügglifeld, Aarau
18:45	Fejzulahi 10' (pen.); Bieli 16' (2:0)	FCA summary FCZ summary	60' (2:1) Gygax; 72' (o.g.) (Oliver Stöckli); 85' (2:3) Ilie	Attendance: 4,500; Referee: (Switzerland) Cyril Zimmermann (Bolligen)
Note: The match was originally scheduled for 2 March, but due to bad weather rescheduled.

9 April 2005 Round 27	Aarau	1–7	Thun	Stadion Brügglifeld, Aarau
19:30	Opango (red card) 66'; Bieli 71' (1:3)	FCA summary	20' (0:1) Renggli; 34' (0:2) Raimondi; 68' (0:3) Gelson; 74' (1:4) Rey; 78' (1:5) Lustrinelli; 88' (1:6) Gelson; 91' (1:7) Moser	Attendance: 3,700; Referee: (Switzerland) Markus Nobs (Wohlen bei Bern)

17 April 2005 Round 28	Thun	5–0	Aarau	Stadion Lachen, Thun
14:30	Gelson 8' (1:0); Lustrinelli 8' (2:0); Renggli 36' (3:0); Gerber 40' (4:0); Gelson 66' (5:0)	FCA summary	(yellow card) 34' Bühler; (red card) 40' Opango	Attendance: 3,700; Referee: (Switzerland) Florian Etter

20 April 2005 Round 29	Aarau	0–5	Basel	Stadion Brügglifeld, Aarau
19:30	Stöckli (yellow card) 15'; Simo (yellow card) 17'; Inler (yellow card) 24'; Schmid (yellow card) 37'	FCB summary FCA summary	14' (0:1) Smiljanić; 16' (pen.) Giménez; 33' (0:3) Giménez; (yellow card) 61' Chipperfield; 77' (0:4) Giménez; 90' (0:5) Giménez	Attendance: 5,700; Referee: (Switzerland) Sascha Kever (Vezia)
Note: FCA without Colomba, Christ, Wardanjan and Bättig (all injured), Bekiri (was ill), Opango (suspended), and Varela and Vanetta (both excused from duty). Giallanza acted as captain. FCB without Zwyssig (suspended), and Carignano, Petric and Murat Yakin (all injured). 89th minute, a shot from Bieli hit the post.

23 April 2005 Round 30	Grasshopper Club	1–1	Aarau	Hardturm, Zürich
19:30	Seoane 29' (1:0); Mitreski (yellow card) 42'; Jaggy (yellow card) 65'; Lichtsteiner (yellow card) 72'	FCA summary	(yellow card) 38' Moretto; (yellow card) 47' Fejzulahi; 55' (1:1) Inler; (yellow card) 57' Schenker; (yellow card) 90+1' Inler	Attendance: 4,700; Referee: (Switzerland) Martin Salm (Veltheim, Aargau)
Note: 55th minute, Gökhan Inler scored his first professional goal.

27 April 2005 Round 22	Young Boys	1–1	Aarau	Stadion Neufeld, Bern
18:45	Steinsson (yellow card) 29'; Knez (yellow card); Neri 36' (1:0)	FCA summary	(yellow card) 20' Simo; (yellow card) 42' Schenker; 58' (1:1) Inler	Attendance: 4,800; Referee: (Switzerland) Guido Wildhaber (Kerzers)
Note: Match originally scheduled for 6 March, but was rescheduled after postponement. The Young Boys played their home games in the Stadion Neufeld after the Wankdorf Stadium was demolished in 2001 and the new Stadion Wankdorf was constructed on the same site.

30 April 2005 Round 31	Aarau	3–1	St. Gallen	Stadion Brügglifeld, Aarau
19:30	Moretto 40' (1:1); Moretto 54' (2:1); Tcheutchoua (yellow card) 61'; Bieli (red card) 66'; Inler 89' (3:1)	FCA summary	(yellow card) 7' Zellweger; 13' (0:1) Marazzi; (yellow card) 84' Hassli; (yellow card) 90' López	Attendance: 4,800; Referee: (Switzerland) Carlo Bertolini (Vira-Gambarogno)

4 May 2005 Round 20	Schaffhausen	1–1	Aarau	Stadion Breite, Schaffhausen
18:45	Todisco (yellow card) 39'; Senn 43' (1:1); Miladin (yellow card) 90+1'; Sereinig (yellow card) 90+2'	summary	23' (0:1) Schenker; (yellow card) 68' Opango; (yellow card) 79' Dugić	Attendance: 3,150; Referee: (Switzerland) Claudio Circhetta (Muttenz)
Note: Match originally scheduled for 27 February, but postponed due to bad weather and scheduled for 9 March 2005, but again postponed and rescheduled. FCA without Bieli (suspended).

7 May 2005 Round 32	Servette	Cancelled	Aarau	Stade de Genève, Lancy
		FCA summary

11 May 2005 Round 33	Xamax	1–1	Aarau	Stade Charrière, La Chaux-de-Fonds
19:30	M'Futi 11' (1:0); Forschelet (yellow card) 37'; Baumann (yellow card) 89'	FCA summary	86' (1:1) Dugić}	Attendance: 3,300; Referee: (Switzerland) René Rogalla (Wallisellen)
Note: Xamax played their home games in la Charrière between July 2004 and February 2007 while the old Stade de la Maladière was demolished and the new stadium was constructed on the same site.

18 May 2005 Round 34	Aarau	0–1	Schaffhausen	Stadion Brügglifeld, Aarau
19:30	Tcheutchoua (yellow card) 19'; Bieli (yellow card) 69'	FCA summary	(yellow card) 15' Senn; 40' (o.g.) (Bühler); (yellow card) 88' Todisco	Attendance: 4,600; Referee: (Switzerland) Reto Rutz (Amriswil)

22 May 2005 Round 35	Aarau	1–1	Young Boys	Stadion Brügglifeld, Aarau
16:15	Bieli 7' (1:0); Tcheutchoua (yellow card) 15'	FCA summary	38' (1:1) Häberli; (yellow card) 71' Eugster	Attendance: 5,100; Referee: (Switzerland) Philippe Leuba (Chexbres)

29 May 2005 Round 36	Zürich	2–0	Aarau	Letzigrund, Zürich
16:15	Džemaili (yellow card) 64'; César 90' (pen.); Keita 90+1' (2:0)	FCZ summary FCA summary		Attendance: 7,800; Referee: (Switzerland) Guido Wildhaber (Kerzers)
Note: 30th minute, a shot from Keite hit the post. 83 minute FCA striker Dugić was substituted out injured.

==== Final league table ====
Pos	Team	Pld	W	D	L	GF	GA	GD	Pts	Qualification or relegation
1	Basel	34	21	7	6	81	45	+36	70	Swiss champions qualification to Champions League third qualifying round
2	Thun	34	18	6	10	69	42	+27	60	qualification to Champions League second qualifying round
3	Grasshopper Club	34	12	14	8	51	50	+1	50	qualification to UEFA Cup second qualifying round
4	Young Boys	34	12	13	9	60	52	+8	49	entered Intertoto Cup second round
5	Zürich	34	13	9	12	55	57	−2	48	Swiss Cup winners qualification to UEFA Cup second qualifying round (Note: Qualified as 2004–05 Swiss Cup winners)
6	Xamax	34	10	8	16	36	48	−12	38	entered Intertoto Cup first round
7	St. Gallen	34	8	12	14	51	60	−9	36	
8	Aarau	34	7	11	16	42	64	−22	32	
9	Schaffhausen	34	7	11	16	36	59	−23	32	qualification to relegation play-off
10	Servette (Note: Servette were docked three points for financial irregularities.) (R)	18	6	5	7	24	28	−4	20	relegated to 2005–06 1. Liga (Note: Servette went bankrupt during the winter break and did not play the second half of the season. Restart in the 3rd level (1. Liga) in 2005/06)

Source: RSSSF
Rules for classification: 1) points; 2) goal difference; 3) number of goals scored.
(R) Relegated

=== Swiss Cup ===
This season's Swiss Cup was the 80th edition of the annual cup competition. It began on 17/18/19 September with the games of Round 1 and ended on 16 May 2005 with the final held at St. Jakob-Park, Basel. The winners earned a place in the second qualifying round of the UEFA Cup. Teams from Super League and Challenge League were seeded in the first round. In a match, the home advantage was granted to the team from the lower league, if applicable.

18 September 2004 Round 1	FC Niedergösgen	0–9	Aarau	Inseli, Niedergösgen
16:15		FCA summary	6' (0:1) Beqiri; 20' (0:2) Bieli; 34' (0:3) Bieli; 40' (0:4) Giallanza; 65' (0:5) Dugić; 68' (0:6) Giallanza; 73' (0:7) Giallanza; 82' (8:0) Beqiri; 87' (0:9) Dugić	Attendance: 2,100; Referee: (Switzerland) Thomas Meier
Note: During the 2004/05 season, FC Niedergösgen played in the 2. Liga interregional (Group 4), the fourth tier of Swiss football at the time.

23 October 2004 Round 2	Lugano	1–1 (a.e.t.) (7–8 p)	Aarau	Cornaredo, Lugano
15:30	Bugnard 68' (pen. 1:1); Viola (yellow card) 76'; Bugnard (yellow card) 111'; Immersi (yellow card) 120'	FCA summary	55' (0:1) Bättig; (yellow card) 66' Vanetta; (yellow card) 80' Beqiri; (yellow card) 120+1' Colomba	Attendance: 880; Referee: (Switzerland) Guido Wildhaber (Kerzers)
	Penalties
	Bugnard (penalty missed); Mollard (penalty missed); Miccolis (penalty scored); Botta (penalty scored); Viola (penalty scored); Rota (penalty scored); Weber (penalty scored); Immersi (penalty scored); Jelmorini (penalty scored); Penzavalli (penalty missed); Cataldo (penalty missed)		(penalty scored) Beqiri; (penalty scored) Opango; (penalty missed) Giallanza; (penalty missed) Simo; (penalty scored) Christ; (penalty scored) Vanetta; (penalty scored) Bättig; (penalty scored) Bieli; (penalty scored) Vardanyan; (penalty missed) Varela; (penalty scored) Colomba

20 November 2005 Round 3	FC Baulmes	0–2	Aarau	Stade Sous-Ville, Baulmes
16:15	R. Cottens (yellow card) 61'; C. Cottens (yellow card) 67'	FCA summary	9' (0:1) Bieli; 11' (0:2) Vanetta; (yellow card) 67' Schenker; (yellow card) 90+1' Vardanyan; (yellow card) 90+2' Paulinho	Attendance: 1,550; Referee: (Switzerland) Cyril Zimmermann (Bolligen)

13 February 2005 Quarter-final	St. Gallen	3–3 (a.e.t.) (3–4 p)	Aarau	Espenmoos, St. Gallen
14:30 CET	Tachie-Mensah 5', 67'; Merenda 107'	FCA summary SFL summary	3' Vanetta; 57' Beqiri; 106' Fejzulahi	Attendance: 7,000; Referee: (Switzerland) René Rogalla (Wallisellen)
	Penalties
	Zellweger (penalty scored); Imhof (penalty missed); Schicker (penalty scored); Tachie-Mensah (penalty scored); Lopez (penalty missed)		(penalty scored) Beqiri; (penalty scored) Vanetta; (penalty scored) Opango; (penalty scored) Fejzulahi

14 April 2005 Semi-final	FC Aarau	1–2	FC Luzern	Stadion Brügglifeld, Aarau
20:15 CEST	Bieli 3'	FCA summary SFL summary	24' Vogt; 30' Sucic	Attendance: 9,250; Referee: (Switzerland) Jérôme Laperrière (Kerzers)

=== Friendly matches ===
In the pre-season and in the winter break, FCA also played various Exhibition games, here examples.

3 July 2004 Exhibition game	Zürich	2–1	Aarau	Gerbihof, Ibach
	Filipescu 16' (1:0); Petrosyan 56' (2:0)	FCZ summary	90+1' (2:1) Paulinho	Attendance: 586; Referee: (Switzerland) Reto Rutschi

== Sources ==
- Switzerland 2004–05 at RSSSF
- FCA squad 2004–05 at arowa.ch

Preceded by 2003–04	FC Aarau seasons	Succeeded by 2005–06
