= 2003–04 FC Aarau season =

FC Aarau
2003–04 season
- Owner: FC Aarau AG
- Club president: Michael Hunziker
- Head-coach from then: Alain Geiger until January 2004; Martin Rueda
- Stadium: Stadion Brügglifeld, Aarau
- 2003–04 Super League: 8th of 10
- 2003–04 Swiss Cup: Round 3
- Top goalscorer: League: Rainer Bieli (14); All: Rainer Bieli (16)

The 2003–04 season was FC Aarau's 101st season in their existence, since their foundation in 1902. It was their twenty-second season in the top-tier of Swiss football, following their promotion at the end of 1980–81 season.

== Overview ==
The public limited company (Aktiengesellschaft) of FC Aarau was founded on 7 January 2003. It is responsible for the professional football operations of the first team in the Challenge League, as well as for high-performance football within the youth sector. At the AGM in May of that year, Michael Hunziker was re-elected as FCA club president. Dr.iur. Michael Hunziker is a Swiss attorney-at-law and notary. He prolonged the contract with last season's head-coach Alain Geiger for another year. During the winter break it came to a change in the team management. The club parted ways with Geiger and presented Martin Rueda as their new head-coach.

The club had long earnt their nickname the unrelegatable due to the fact that since the 1998–99 season they had contineously ended the league season in the relegation zone but had always saved themselves in extremis, especially noteworthy here is the 2001–02 season as they ended the season on a relegation slot, but remained in top-tier via the green table. In the previous season they had also only escaped relegation via the promotion/relegation stage.

The FCA first team competed in this season's domestic first-tier, the newly reformed 2003–04 Super League, with the clear intention of retaining their top-tier status. The team also competed in the 2003–04 Swiss Cup and here the aim was to stay in the competition as kong as possible. The FCA team had not qualified for the UEFA European competitions and they did not enter the Intertoto Cup.

FCA played their home games in the Stadion Brügglifeld and the stadium is located on the southern outskirts of Aarau, in the territory of the neighboring municipality of Suhr. The stadium is about one and a half kilometers from Aarau city center and the railway station.

== Players ==
The following is the list of the FCA first team squad this season. It also includes players that were in the squad the day the domestic league season started, on 15 July 2000, but subsequently left the club after that date.

Note: Flags indicate national team as defined under FIFA eligibility rules; some limited exceptions apply. Players may hold more than one non-FIFA nationality.

No.	Pos.	Nation	Player
18	GK	SUI	Swen König (league games: 1)
23	GK	SUI	Massimo Colomba (league games: 35)
2	DF	SUI	Flavio Schmid (league games: 26)
3	DF	ITA	Davide Moretto (league games: 13)
4	DF	SUI	Marco Walker (league games: 5)
4	DF	SUI	Stephan Keller (league games: 12)
5	DF	SUI	Sven Christ (league games: 14)
6	DF	SUI	Gerardo Seoane (league games: 30)
12	DF	BRA	Paulo Menezes (league games: 17)
13	DF	SUI	Luca Denicolà (league games: 15)
15	DF	BRA	Zé Luís (league games: 2)
19	DF	CAM	Jean-Pierre Tcheutchoua (league games: 26)
20	DF	BRA	Alexandre de Freitas (league games: 5)

No.	Pos.	Nation	Player
21	DF	SUI	Arnaud Bühler (league games: 22)
24	DF	SUI	Matteo Vanetta (league games: 34)
10	MF	POL	Marek Citko (league games: 24)
11	MF	ESP	Carlos Varela (league games: 28)
14	MF	BDI	David Opango (league games: 20)
15	MF	SRB	Borko Marinkovic (league games: 4)
16	MF	SUI	Alain Schultz (league games: 17)
22	MF	BEN	Alain Gaspoz (league games: 26)
7	FW	SUI	Patrick De Napoli (league games: 30)
8	FW	GHA	Charles Wittl (league games: 27)
9	FW	SUI	Rainer Bieli (league games: 36)
17	FW	GEO	Mikheil Kavelashvili (league games: 16)

Players who joined the squad

The following is the list of players that joined the FCZ first team squad in the off or pre-season or during the winter-break transfer window. It also includes players that advanced from the youth team during the season and achieved at least one domestic league appearance.

Note: Flags indicate national team as defined under FIFA eligibility rules; some limited exceptions apply. Players may hold more than one non-FIFA nationality.

No.	Pos.	Nation	Player
21	DF	SUI	Arnaud Bühler (on loan from Lausanne-Sport)
5	DF	SUI	Sven Christ (from Mainz 05)
20	DF	BRA	Alexandre de Freitas (from Baden)
13	DF	SUI	Luca Denicolà (on loan from Grasshopper Club)
22	MF	BEN	Alain Gaspoz (from Servette)
17	FW	GEO	Mikheil Kavelashvili (from Sion)
4	DF	SUI	Stephan Keller (on loan from Zürich)

No.	Pos.	Nation	Player
18	GK	SUI	Swen König (from youth team)
15	MF	SRB	Borko Marinkovic (from Slavia Sofia)
12	DF	BRA	Paulo Menezes (from Baden)
19	DF	CAM	Jean-Pierre Tcheutchoua (from Sion)
11	MF	ESP	Carlos Varela (on loan from Basel)
15	DF	BRA	Zé Luís (on loan from Uerdingen 05)

Players who left the squad

The following is the list of the FCA first team players that left the squad during the previous season or in the off-season, before the new domestic season began. Note: Flags indicate national team as defined under FIFA eligibility rules; some limited exceptions apply. Players may hold more than one non-FIFA nationality.

No.	Pos.	Nation	Player
—	GK	SUI	Ivan Benito (to Pistoiese)
—	GK	SUI	Alex Kollbrunner
—	DF	SUI	Frédéric Page (to Union Berlin)
—	DF	SUI	Ivan Previtali
—	DF	AUT	Emanuel Pogatetz (returned to Bayer Leverkusen after loan)
—	DF	SUI	Cyrill Gloor (to Concordia Basel)
—	MF	POL	Dariusz Skrzypczak (to FC Hochdorf)
—	MF	ITA	Roberto Baldassari (retired)
—	MF	SEN	Pape Seydou Diop (to Dinamo București)
—	MF	SEN	Lamine Diarra
—	MF	SUI	Manuel Bühler (to Grasshopper Club)

No.	Pos.	Nation	Player
—	MF	SUI	Elvir Melunović (returned to Grasshopper Club after loan)
—	MF	SUI	Roman Friedli (to Young Boys)
—	MF	SEN	Mamadou Diarra
—	MF	SUI	Manuel Schenker
—	MF	SUI	Sven Lüscher (to SC Zofingen)
—	MF	SUI	Francesco Nucera
—	FW	NIG	Christian Okpala
—	FW	UKR	Serhiy Skachenko (returned to Metz after loan)
—	FW	SUI	Frédéric Chassot (to YF Juventus)
—	FW	SUI	David Degen (to Basel)

== Results ==
Legend

Win Draw Loss Postponed

=== Super League ===
==== First half of season ====
In the newly reformed Swiss Super League, this season was contested by ten teams. The season was competed in four round-robins, two before the winter-break and two further rounds after the break. The league season began on 16 July 2003 and was completed on 23 May 2004.

16 July 2003 Round 1	Thun	1–1	Aarau	Stadion Lachen, Thun
19:30	(Walker) 5' (o.g.); Aegerter (yellow card) 64'; Milicevic (yellow card) 90+1'	FCZ summary	40' (1:1) Walker	Attendance: 3,450; Referee: (Switzerland) Massimo Busacca (Monte Carasso/Bellinzona)

19 July 2003 Round 2	Aarau	2–1	Grasshopper Club	Stadion Brügglifeld, Aarau
19:30	Varela 20' (1:0); Varela (yellow card) 27'; Walker (yellow card) 30' de Napoli (yellow card) 41'; Gaspoz (yellow card) 53'; Walker 52' (2:1) de Freitas (yellow card) 88' de Napoli (penalty missed) 88′	FCA summary	(yellow card) 9' Lichtsteiner; 31' (pen.) Núñez; (yellow card) 33' Mitreski; (red card) 35' Gamboa; (yellow card) (yellow-red card) 66' Mitreski; (yellow card) (yellow-red card) 80' Lichtsteiner	Attendance: 7,400; Referee: (Switzerland) Guido Wildhaber (Kerzers)
Note: 88th minute, de Napoli shot the penalty kick wide of the goal.

26 July 2003 Round 3	St. Gallen	0–0	Aarau	Espenmoos, St. Gallen
19:30	Wolf (yellow card) 50'	FCA summary	(yellow card) 39' de Napoli; (yellow card) 48' Gaspoz; (yellow card) 84' Citko; (yellow card) 90' Christ	Attendance: 8,500; Referee: (Switzerland) Carlo Bertolini (Vira-Gambarogno)

2 August 2003 Round 4	Aarau	1–1	Servette	Stadion Brügglifeld, Aarau
19:30	Bieli (yellow card) 70'; Seoane (yellow card) 83'; Varela 90+3' (1:1); (yellow card) 90+2' Gaspoz	FCA summary	(yellow card) 45' Lombardo; 46' (0:1) Comisetti; (yellow card) 70' Hilton	Attendance: 6,500; Referee: (Switzerland) René Rogalla (Wallisellen)

9 August 2003 Round 5	Basel	3–1	Aarau	St. Jakob-Park, Basel
19:30	Atouba (yellow card) 17'; M. Yakin 21' (1:0); Rossi 69' (2:1); Huggel 79' (3:1)	FCB summary FCA summary	(yellow card) 20' Seoane; (yellow card) 28' Varela; 59' (2:1) de Napoli; (yellow card) 78' Wittl; (yellow card) 79' Christ	Attendance: 24,430; Referee: (Switzerland) Nicole Petignat (Courgenay)
Note: FCB without Ergic (long-term illness), Esposito, Quennoz, and Smiljanic (all injured). FCA without Edilson and Opango (both injured). 49th minute, a shot from Huggel hit the post.

17 August 2003 Round 6	Aarau	3–1	Young Boys	Stadion Brügglifeld, Aarau
16:15	Bieli 26' (1:0); Varela (yellow card) 33'; Bieli 48' (2:0); Schmid 90+1' (3:1)	FCA summary	89' (2:1) Magnin	Attendance: 7,200; Referee: (Switzerland) Florian Etter

23 August 2003 Round 7	Xamax	0–1	Aarau	Stade de la Maladière, Neuchâtel
19:30		FCA summary	(Barea) 6' (o.g.); (yellow card) 17' Seoane; (yellow card) 57' de Napoli; (yellow card) 66' Schmid	Attendance: 5,800; Referee: (Switzerland) Reto Rutz (Amriswil)

30 August 2003 Round 8	Aarau	3–3	Zürich	Stadion Brügglifeld, Aarau
19:30	Keller (yellow card) 6'; Bieli 11' (1:0) de Napoli 44' (2:2) de Napoli 62' (3:3); Gaspoz (yellow card) 73'	FCZ summary FCA summary	28' (o.g.) (Vanetta); 33' (1:2) Gygax; 53' (2:3) Nef; (yellow card) 87' Keita	Attendance: 5,100; Referee: (Switzerland) Massimo Busacca (Monte Carasso/Bellinzona)

3 September 2003 Round 9	Wil	1–0	Aarau	Stadion Bergholz, Wil
19:30	Fabinho 80' (1:0)	FCA summary	(yellow card) 72' Vanetta; (yellow card) 90+3' Tcheutchoua	Attendance: 2,400; Referee: (Switzerland) Jérôme Laperrière (Kerzers)

14 September 2003 Round 10	Aarau	1–2	Thun	Stadion Brügglifeld, Aarau
16:15	Opango (yellow card) 10' de Napoli 46' (1:1) de Napoli (yellow card) 90+1'	FCA summary	11' (0:1) Schneider; (yellow card) 55' Cerrone; (yellow card) 59' Milicevic; 60' (1:2) Rama; (yellow card) 64' Hodžić; (yellow card) (yellow-red card) 68' Milicevic; (yellow card) 76' Rama	Attendance: 5,000; Referee: (Austria) Louis Hofmann
Note: This match was played as part of the interaction referee exchange between the Swiss Football Association and the Austrian Football Association.

28 September 2003 Round 11	Grasshopper Club	2–3	Aarau	Hardturm, Zürich
16:15	Spycher 50' (1:1) (Vanetta) 67' (o.g.); Lichtsteiner (yellow card) 79'; Gane (yellow card) 82'	FCA summary	22' (0:1) Seoane; (yellow card) 39' Gaspoz; 51' (1:2) Bieli; 62' (1:3) Bieli; (yellow card) (yellow-red card) 90+1' Gaspoz	Attendance: 5,800; Referee: (Switzerland) Urs Meier (Wettingen and Würenlos)
Note: 36th minute GC defender Opabunmi carried off injured.

2 October 2003 Round 12	Aarau	3–1	St. Gallen	Stadion Brügglifeld, Aarau
19:30	Tcheutchoua 3' (1:0); Varela (yellow card) 4'; Bieli 18' (2:0); Vanetta (yellow card) 20'; Bieli 27' (3:1)	FCA summary	(yellow card) 23' Barnetta; 55' (3:1) Tachie-Mensah	Attendance: 4,500; Referee: (Switzerland) Claudio Circhetta (Muttenz)

5 October 2003 Round 13	Servette	3–1	Aarau	Stade de Genève, Lancy
16:15	Kader 21' (1:0); Zambrella (yellow card) 27'; Bah (yellow card) 45'; Aziawonou 60' (2:1); Aziawonou (yellow card) 61'; Lombardo (yellow card) 86'; Kader 90+3' (3:1)	FCA summary	41' (1:1) Vanetta; (yellow card) 54' de Napoli; (yellow card) 88' Marinkovic	Attendance: 7,750; Referee: (Switzerland) René Rogalla (Wallisellen)

27 October 2003 Round 14	Aarau	2–2	Basel	Stadion Brügglifeld, Aarau
16:15	de Napoli 6' (1:0) de Napoli (yellow card) 32'; Varela (yellow card) 49' de Napoli 66' (2:2)	FCB summary FCA summary	(yellow card) 7' Barberis; 27' (1:1) Chipperfield; (yellow card) 44' P. Degen; 54' (1:2) Tum; (yellow card) 56' Cantaluppi	Attendance: 9,250; Referee: (Switzerland) Philippe Leuba (Chexbres)
Note: FCB without Ergic (long-term illness). 31st minute FCA midfielder Bühler substituted out injured. Basel's run of winning 16 games in a row (including three games last season) came to an end here.

29 October 2003 Round 15	Young Boys	5–3	Aarau	Stadion Neufeld, Bern
19:30	Häberli (yellow card) 6'; Wölfli (yellow card) 42'; Chapuisat 43' (1:1); Chapuisat 44' (2:1); Häberli 45' (3:1); Häberli 49' (4:1); Chapuisat 61' (5:1); Coubageat (yellow card) 68'	FCA summary	4' (0:1) de Napoli; (yellow card) 45' Schmid; (yellow card) 63' Wittl; 81' (5:2) Wittl; 90' (5:3) Moretto	Attendance: 5,250; Referee: (Liechtenstein) Roland Beck (Triesenberg)
Note: The Young Boys played their home games in the Stadion Neufeld after the Wankdorf Stadium was demolished in 2001 and the new Stadion Wankdorf was constructed on the same site. FCA without midfielder Bühler (injured). 18th minute, Seoane substituted out injured. 42nd minute YB goalkeeper Wöfli was booked for a hand ball out side of the penalty-area.

2 November 2003 Round 16	Aarau	1–1	Xamax	Stadion Brügglifeld, Aarau
16:15	Bieli 18' (1:0); Tcheutchoua (yellow card) 31'; Schmid (yellow card) 75'	FCA summary	(yellow card) 51' Valente; (yellow card) 74' Barea; 90+1' M'Futi	Attendance: 4,000; Referee: (Switzerland) Jérôme Laperrière (Kerzers)

23 November 2003 Round 17	Zürich	4–2	Aarau	Letzigrund, Zürich
16:15	Petrosyan 4' (1:0); Petrosyan (yellow card) 45'; Matić 56' (2:2); Nef 68' (3:2); Keita (yellow card) 67'; Nef (yellow card) 73'; Muff 90+2' (4:2)	FCZ summary FCA summary	(yellow card) 11' Vanetta; 32' (1:1) Varela; 43' (1:2) Varela; (yellow card) 60' (yellow-red card) 69' Varela	Attendance: 4,700; Referee: (Switzerland) Florian Etter

30 November 2003 Round 18	Aarau	1–1	Wil	Stadion Brügglifeld, Aarau
16:15	de Freitas 45' (1:0)	FCA summary	(yellow card) 44' Fabinho; (yellow card) 52' Montandon; 68' (1:1) Fabinho; (yellow card) 89' Pires	Attendance: 3,500; Referee: (Switzerland) Markus Nobs (Wohlen bei Bern)

==== Second half of season ====
The second half of the season started on 15 February 2004 and was completed on 22/23 May.

15 February 2004 Round 19	Aarau	2–4	Zürich	Stadion Brügglifeld, Aarau
14:30	Opango 1' (1:0); Opango (yellow card) 24'; Varela (yellow card) 42'; Christ (yellow card) 56'; Vanetta (yellow card) 63'; Paulinho 85' (2:3); Gaspoz (yellow card) 88'	FCZ summary FCA summary	8' (1:1) Muff; (yellow card) 39' Schneider; (yellow card) 43' Nef; 11' (1:2) Petrosyan; 54' (1:3) Muff; 90+3' (2:4) Džemaili	Attendance: 5,400; Referee: (Switzerland) Massimo Busacca (Monte Carasso/Bellinzona)
Note: FCA for the first time with Martin Rueda as head-coach. First top-tier goal for Blerim Džemaili.

22 February 2004 Round 20	Thun	6–3	Aarau	Stadion Lachen, Thun
14:30	Rama 2' (1:0); Hodžić 15' (2:0); Zanni 21' (3:1); Raimondi 40' (4:1); Gerber 55' (5:2); Gerber 76' (6:2)	FCA summary	16' (2:1) Kavelashvili; (yellow card) 28' de Napoli; (yellow card) 43' Varela; 50' (4:2) Kavelashvili; 77' (6:3) Kavelashvili	Attendance: 3,500; Referee: (Switzerland) René Rogalla (Wallisellen)
Note: FCA withou Vanetta (suspended)

29 February 2004 Round 21	Wil	1–1	Aarau	Stadion Bergholz, Wil
14:30	Montandon (yellow card) 26'; Nushi 31' (1:1); Savić (yellow card) 59'; Winkler (yellow card) 61'	FCA summary	4' (0:1) Vanetta; (yellow card) 6' Seoane; (yellow card) 90+1' Bieli	Attendance: 2,266; Referee: (Switzerland) Philippe Leuba (Chexbres)

7 March 2004 Round 22	Aarau	0–1	Servette	Stadion Brügglifeld, Aarau
14:30	Bühler (yellow card) 7'; Tcheutchoua (yellow card) 54'	FCA summary	(yellow card) 15' Bah; (yellow card) 32' Londono; 50' (0:1) Kader	Attendance: 4,000; Referee: (Switzerland) Nicole Petignat (Courgenay)

14 March 2004 Round 23	Young Boys	2–2	Aarau	Stadion Neufeld, Bern
14:30	Knez 5' (1:0); Sermeter (yellow card) 50'; Melunović 71' (2:2); Magnin (yellow card) 79'; Melunović (yellow card) 84'; Knez (yellow card) 90'	FCA summary	(yellow card) 31' Seoane; 40' (1:1) Varela; (yellow card) 42' Varela; (yellow card) 54' Tcheutchoua; 58' (1:2) de Napoli; (yellow card) 70' Keller; (yellow card) 89' de Napoli; (yellow card) 90+2' Wittl	Attendance: 6,500; Referee: (Switzerland) Claudio Circhetta (Muttenz)
Note: The Young Boys played their home games in the Stadion Neufeld after the Wankdorf Stadium was demolished in 2001 and the new Stadion Wankdorf was constructed on the same site.

17 March 2004 Round 24	Aarau	2–2	Grasshopper Club	Stadion Brügglifeld, Aarau
19:30	Kavelashvili 15' (1:1); Bühler (yellow card) 38'; Citko 45' (pen. 2:2); Keller (red card) 84'	FCA summary	11' (0:1) Gane; (yellow card) 18' Schwegler; (yellow card) 23' Mihai Tararache; 24' (1:2) Gane; (yellow card) 31' Gamboa; (yellow card) 45' Cabanas; (yellow card) 90+1' da Silva	Attendance: 5,000; Referee: (Switzerland) Reto Rutz (Amriswil)

20 March 2004 Round 25	Basel	3–1	Aarau	St. Jakob-Park, Basel
19:30	Cantaluppi (yellow card) 28'; Giménez 43' (1:1); Rossi 71' (2:1); Giménez 76' (3:1)	FCB summary FCA summary	(yellow card) 24' Gaspoz; 27' (0:1) Opango; (yellow card) 51' Tcheutchoua; (yellow card) 64' Seoane; (yellow card) 64' Opango; (yellow card) 67' Moretto	Attendance: 26,099; Referee: (Switzerland) Guido Wildhaber (Kerzers)
Note: FCB without Murat Yakin (injured) and Ergic (recovering from longterm illness). FCA without De Napoli, Keller and Varela (all suspended), as well as Christ (injured). 14th minute, a goal by Gimenez was disallowed for offside. 15th minute, a shot from Huggel hit the crossbar. 71st minute, a header from Huggel hit the post.

28 March 2004 Round 26	Aarau	3–0	St. Gallen	Stadion Brügglifeld, Aarau
14:30	Citko 27' (pen.); Seoane 38' (2:0); Opango (yellow card) 47'; Bühler (yellow card) 61'; Keller (yellow card) 70'; Varela 90+2' (3:0)	FCA summary	(yellow card) 33' Imhof	Attendance: 5,200; Referee: (Switzerland) Philippe Leuba (Chexbres)

4 April 2004 Round 27	Xamax	4–1	Aarau	Stade de la Maladière, Neuchâtel
14:30	Forschelet 12' (1:0); Forschelet 72' (2:0); Bah (yellow card) 86'; M'Futi 87' (3:1); Rey 90+1' (4:1)	FCA summary	(yellow card) 25' de Napoli; (yellow card) 49' (yellow-red card) 65' Moretto; 80' (2:1) Kavelashvili; (yellow card) 87' Seoane; (yellow card) (yellow-red card) 87' de Napoli	Attendance: 4,700; Referee: (Switzerland) Reto Rutz (Amriswil)

8 April 2004 Round 28	Aarau	2–0	Xamax	Stadion Brügglifeld, Aarau
19:30	Varela (yellow card) 6'; Citko 23' (1:0); Bühler (yellow card) 77'; Gaspoz (yellow card) 82'; Bieli 90+2' (2:0)	FCA summary	(yellow card) 18' Mangane	Attendance: 4,300; Referee: (Switzerland) René Rogalla (Wallisellen)
Note: FCA without de Napoli and Moretto (both suspended).

15 April 2004 Round 29	St. Gallen	2–0	Aarau	Espenmoos, St. Gallen
19:30	Barnetta (yellow card) 18'; Marić 24' (1:0); Marić (yellow card) 65'; Jairo 87' (2:0); Naldo (yellow card) 90'	FCA summary	(yellow card) 26' Opango; (yellow card) 29' Tcheutchoua; (yellow card) 56' Varela; (yellow card) 75' Schmid	Attendance: 8,000; Referee: (Switzerland) Nicole Petignat (Courgenay)

18 April 2004 Round 30	Aarau	3–0	Basel	Stadion Brügglifeld, Aarau
14:30	Wittl 4' (1:0); Tcheutchoua 60' (2:0); Bieli (yellow card) 73'; Zuberbühler 77' (o.g. 3:0); Opango (yellow card) 90'	FCB summary FCA summary	(yellow card) 25' Džombić; (yellow card) 76' D. Degen	Attendance: 9,250 (sold out); Referee: (Austria) Stefan Messner
Note: This match was played as part of the interaction referee exchange between the Swiss Football Association and the Austrian Football Association. FCA without Gaspoz and Schmid (both suspended) as well as Menezes (injured). FCB without Murat Yakin, Rapo, Quennoz, and Zwyssig (all injured), and Ergic (recovering from illness). Damir Dzombic (19), a native of Bosnia, made his Super League debut in FCB’s central defense.

24 April 2004 Round 31	Grasshopper Club	4–1	Aarau	Hardturm, Zürich
19:30	Núñez 25' (pen.); Núñez 29' (2:0); Núñez 78' (pen.); Núñez 84' (4:1)	FCA summary	80' (3:1) Kavelashvili	Attendance: 6,500; Referee: (Switzerland) Markus Nobs (Wohlen bei Bern)
Note: 41st minute, GC midfielder Carlos da Silva substituted out injured.

1 May 2004 Round 32	Aarau	0–1	Young Boys	Stadion Brügglifeld, Aarau
19:30	Tcheutchoua (yellow card) 24'; Opango (yellow card) 64'; Wittl (yellow card) 85'	FCA summary	(yellow card) 29' Knez; 58' (0:1) Häberli	Attendance: 5,400; Referee: (Switzerland) Claudio Circhetta (Muttenz)

8 May 2004 Round 33	Servette	1–1	Aarau	Stade de Genève, Lancy
19:30	Lombardo (yellow card) 8'; Sarni (yellow card) 12'; Mesbah 25' (1:0); Jaquet (yellow card) 90+2'	FCA summary	45' (1:1) Bieli	Attendance: 7,654; Referee: (Switzerland) Massimo Busacca (Monte Carasso/Bellinzona)
Note: FCA without Wittl (suspended).

12 May 2004 Round 34	Aarau	4–0	Wil	Stadion Brügglifeld, Aarau
19:30	Vanetta (yellow card) 9'; Gaspoz (yellow card) 30'; Bieli 24' (1:0); Bieli 38' (2:0); Kavelashvili 59' (3:0); Keller (yellow card) 61'; Kavelashvili 77' (4:0); Seoane (yellow card) 85'	FCA summary	(yellow card) 25' Blunschi; (yellow card) 82' Nushi; (yellow card) 88' Hämmerli	Attendance: 4,100; Referee: (Switzerland) René Rogalla (Wallisellen)

15 May 2004 Round 35	Aarau	1–2	Thun	Stadion Brügglifeld, Aarau
19:30	Citko 42' (pen.); Gaspoz (yellow card) 83'	FCA summary	28' (0:1) Raimondi; (yellow card) 42' Ferreira; (yellow card) 58' Dos Santos; 85' (1:2) Rodríguez; (yellow card) (yellow-red card) 88' Ferreira	Attendance: 5,900; Referee: (Switzerland) Claudio Circhetta (Muttenz)

23 May 2004 Round 36	Zürich	4–1	Aarau	Letzigrund, Zürich
16:15	Yasar 10' (1:0); Di Jorio 59' (2:1); Nef (yellow card) 62'; Petrosyan 68' (3:1); Matić 71' (4:1)	FCA summary FCZ summary	23' (1:1) Kavelashvili; (yellow card) 64' Vanetta	Attendance: 4,900; Referee: (Switzerland) Florian Etter
Note: Professional debut for FCA goalkeeper Swen König.

==== Final league table ====
Pos	Team	Pld	W	D	L	GF	GA	GD	Pts	Qualification or relegation
1	Basel	36	26	7	3	86	32	+54	85	Swiss champions qualification to Champions League third qualifying round
2	Young Boys	36	22	6	8	75	48	+27	72	qualification to Champions League second qualifying round
3	Servette	36	15	7	14	61	62	−1	52	qualification to UEFA Cup second qualifying round
4	Zürich	36	14	8	14	58	52	+6	50	
5	St. Gallen	36	14	8	14	54	57	−3	50	
6	Thun	36	13	10	13	51	57	−6	49	entered Intertoto Cup first round
7	Grasshopper	36	12	5	19	62	74	−12	41	
8	Aarau	36	9	11	16	57	69	−12	38	
9	Xamax	36	10	6	20	46	63	−17	36	qualification to relegation play-off
10	Wil	36	7	8	21	37	73	−36	29	relegated to Swiss Challenge League; Swiss Cup winners qualification to UEFA Cup second qualifying round

Source: RSSSF
Rules for classification: 1) points; 2) goal difference; 3) number of goals scored.

=== Swiss Cup ===
The format of this season's cup competition had been reorganised and all the professional clubs joined in the first round. The first-tier teams were seeded and cound not be drawn against each other. The draw respected regionalities, when possible, and the lower classed team was granted home advantage. The first round of this season's cup competition started on the 19 and 20 September and ended on 12 April 2004 with the final held at St. Jakob-Park in Basel.

20 September 2003 Round 1	FC Othmarsingen	0–4	Aarau	Falkenmatt, Othmarsingen
16:15		FCA summary	23' (0:1) de Napoli; 27' (0:2) Schmid; 37' (0:3) Citko; 45' (0:4) Bieli; (yellow card) Wittl	Attendance: 2,150; Referee: (Switzerland) Martin Salm (Veltheim, Aargau)
Note: FC Othmarsingen played the 2003/04 season in the 2. Liga interregional (fourth-tier).

18 October 2003 Round 2	Schaffhausen	1–2 (a.e.t.)	Aarau	Stadion Breite, Schaffhausen
16:15	Bunjaku 15' (1:0)	FCA summary	54' (1:1) Bieli; 118' (og 1:2) (Rohrer)	Attendance: 1,475; Referee: (Switzerland) Massimo Busacca (Monte Carasso/Bellinzona)
Note: FC Schaffhausen played the 2003/04 season in the Challenge League (second-tier).

9 November 2003 Round 3	Aarau	1–2 (a.e.t.)	St. Gallen	Stadion Brügglifeld, Aarau
14:30	Vanetta 35' (1:0); Varela (yellow card); Vanetta (yellow card); Citko (yellow card) de Napoli (yellow card); Christ (yellow card)	FCA summary	90' (1:1) Bättig; 116' (1:2) Merenda; (yellow card) Tachie-Mensah	Attendance: 3,500; Referee: (Switzerland) Guido Wildhaber (Kerzers)

St. Gallen continued to the quarter-finals and then semi-finals, where they were defeated by Wil. In the final Wil beat GC 3–2 and so they qualified themselves for the UEFA Cup second qualifying round.

== Sources ==
- Switzerland 2003–04 at RSSSF
- FCA squad 2003–04 at arowa.ch

Preceded by 2002–03	FC Aarau seasons	Succeeded by 2004–05
