= 2003–04 Swiss Cup =

Tournament details
- Country: Switzerland
- Teams: 64

Final positions
- Champions: FC Wil
- Runners-up: Grasshoppers

The 2003–04 Swiss Cup was the 79th season of Switzerland's annual cup competition. It began on 19 September with the first games of Round 1 and ended on 12 April 2004 with the final held at St. Jakob-Park, Basel. The winners earned a place in the second qualifying round of the UEFA Cup.

== Overview ==
The Swiss Football Association (ASF/SFV) had not only modified the top-tier of their league system in advance of this season, but they also mosified the format of this years cup competition. To be explained as follows, in this season's cup competition all the professional clubs joined in the first round. In the years before, they had received byes in the earlier rounds and had joined in the later rounds. The first-tier teams were seeded in this first round and cound not be drawn against each other. The draw respected regionalities, when possible, and the lower classed team was granted home advantage. The first round of this season's cup competition started on 19, 20 and 21 September and ended on 12 April 2004 with the final, that was held at St. Jakob-Park in Basel.

== Round 1 ==
=== Summary ===
Team 1	Score	Team 2
19 September 2003
FC Brugg	0–1	FC Baden
FC Alle	1–5	FC Basel
20 September 2003
FC Châtel St. Denis	0–7	Yverdon-Sport FC
FC Lutry	1–10	FC Meyrin
FC Baulmes	2–5	Neuchâtel Xamax FC
FC Montreux-Sports	0–2	Urania Genève Sport
Étoile-Carouge FC	5–1	Vevey Sports
US Colloumbey-Muraz	0–3	BSC Young Boys
FC Sarnen	0–2	SC Kriens
FC Sursee	1–1 (a.e.t.) (p. 2–4)	FC Bulle
FC Moutier	0–3	FC Luzern
FC Allmendingen	0–7	FC Thun
FC Martigny-Sports	4–2	FC Münsingen
FC Siviriez	3–0	FC Naters
FC Othmarsingen	0–4	FC Aarau
SC Dornach	1–2	FC Concordia Basel
FC Wangen bei Olten	2–0	SR Delémont
FC Olten	1–2	FC Solothurn
SC YF Juventus	1–2	Grasshoppers
FC Dietikon	1–3	FC Winterthur
FC Wiesendangen	0–6	FC Zürich
Zug 94	1–3	FC Schaffhausen
Inter Club Zurigo	0–1 (a.e.t.)	FC Wohlen
FC Regensdorf	1–0	FC Effretikon
FC Chur 97	0–2	FC St. Gallen
GC Biaschesi	1–3	FC Wil
FC Stabio	3–2 (a.e.t.)	FC Chiasso
FC Winkeln SG	0–4	FC Malcantone Agno
FC Herisau	2–0	AC Bellinzona
FC Ebnat-Kappel	0–7	FC Tuggen
21 September 2003
FC Collex-Bossy	0–4	Servette FC
FC Cortaillod	0–4	FC La Chaux-de-Fonds

- ^1Match awarded. Originally finished 1–4 for Naters.

=== Matches ===
19 September 2003
20:15

FC Alle	1–5	Basel
Tabriche 37' (1:3)	FCB summary	8' (0:1) Zwyssig; 19' (0:2) Huggel; 21' (0:3) Rossi; 38' (1:4) Rossi; 55' (1:5) Huggel

Stade des Prés Domont (Centre Sportif Régional), Alle, Switzerland
Attendance: 4,000
Referee: (Switzerland) Claudio Circhetta (Muttenz)

FC Alle played the 2003/04 season in the 2. Liga regional (fifth-tier). FCB without Atouba and Esposito (both injured), Ergic and Streller (both ill), as well as Hakan Yakin (recovering) and Murat Yakin (rested). Fair game, no yellow cards.

20 September 2003
16:15

FC Othmarsingen	0–4	Aarau
	FCA summary	23' (0:1) de Napoli; 27' (0:2) Schmid; 37' (0:3) Citko; 45' (0:4) Bieli; (yellow card) Wittl

Falkenmatt, Othmarsingen
Attendance: 2,150
Referee: (Switzerland) Martin Salm (Veltheim, Aargau)

FC Othmarsingen played the 2003/04 season in the 2. Liga interregional (fourth-tier).

20 September 2003
16:15

FC Wiesendangen	0–6	Zürich
	FCZ summary	16' (0:1) Petrosyan; 21' (0:2) Guerrero; 43' (0:3) Keita; 50' (0:4) Keita; 55' (0:5) Chihab; 60' (0:6) Gygax

Sportplatz Rietsamen, Wiesendangen
Attendance: 3,000
Referee: (Switzerland) Urs Meier (Wettingen and Würenlos)

FC Wiesendangen played the 2003/04 season in the 2. Liga regional (fifth-tier). FCZ without Bastida and Yasar (both injured), as well as Buess and Muff (both suspended). 48th minute, FCW goalkeeper Cédric Peter was substituted out injured. 60th minute, FCZ midfielder Gygax left the pitch due to an injury, leaving FCZ with only nine outfield players. 83rd minute, a shotfrom Petrosyan hit the crossbar; 85th minute, a shot from Chihab hit the post.

20 September 2003

US Colloumbey-Muraz	0–3	Young Boys
Bossu (yellow card) 5'; Roserens (yellow card) 63' (yellow-red card) 76'	YB summary	10' (0:1) Sermeter; (yellow card) 30' Rochat; 87' (0:2) Descloux; 89' (0:2) Giallanza

Collombey-Muraz
Attendance: 1,700
Referee: (Switzerland) Florian Etter

US Colloumbey-Muraz played the 2003/04 season in the 2. Liga regional (fifth-tier).

== Round 2 ==
=== Summary ===
Team 1	Score	Team 2
17 October 2003
Étoile-Carouge FC	0–0 (a.e.t.) (p. 3–4)	FC Meyrin
SC Kriens	1–2	FC Winterthur
18 October 2003
FC Stabio	0–2	FC Thun
FC Martigny-Sports	0–1 (a.e.t.)	Yverdon-Sport FC
FC Wangen bei Olten	0–1	FC Zürich
FC Regensdorf	2–5	FC St. Gallen
FC Wohlen	0–2	FC Wil
FC Schaffhausen	1–2 (a.e.t.)	FC Aarau
FC Tuggen	4–1	FC Solothurn
19 October 2003
FC Malcantone Agno	3–2 (a.e.t.)	Servette FC
FC La Chaux-de-Fonds	0–4	BSC Young Boys
Urania Genève Sport	1–4	FC Basel
FC Concordia Basel	2–3	Neuchâtel Xamax FC
FC Luzern	0–4	Grasshoppers
FC Herisau	3–1	FC Baden
FC Siviriez	0–3	FC Bulle

=== Matches ===
18 October 2003
16:15

Wangen bei Olten	0–1	Zürich
Dias (yellow card) 62'	FCZ summary	36' (0:1) Petrosyan; (yellow card) 86' Bastida

Sportplatz Chrüzmatt
Attendance: 2,200
Referee: (Switzerland) Massimo Busacca (Monte Carasso/Bellinzona)

FC Wangen bei Olten played the 2003/04 season in the 1. Liga (third-tier)

18 October 2003
16:15

Schaffhausen	1–2 (a.e.t.)	Aarau
Bunjaku 15' (1:0)	FCA summary	54' (1:1) Bieli; 118' (og 1:2) (Rohrer)

Stadion Breite, Schaffhausen
Attendance: 1,475
Referee: (Switzerland) Massimo Busacca (Monte Carasso/Bellinzona)

FC Schaffhausen played the 2003/04 season in the Challenge League (second-tier).

19 October 2003

Young Boys	0–4	La Chaux-de-Fonds
Vella (yellow card) 32'	YB summary	9' (0:1) Chapuisat; 39' (0:2) Descloux; 63' (0:3) Sermeter; 84' (0:4) Giallanza; (yellow card) 90' Magnin

Stade Charrière, La Chaux-de-Fonds
Attendance: 2,700
Referee: (Switzerland) Jérôme Laperrière (Kerzers)

19 October 2003
16:15

Urania Genève Sport	1–4	Basel
Gabzcyl (yellow card) 51'; Ballon (yellow card) 75'; Rahali (penalty missed) 80′ Gabzcyl 90' (1:4)	FCB summary	7' (0:1) Zwyssig; 15' (0:2) Rossi; 19' (0:3) Esposito; 44' (0:4) Quennoz

Stade des Trois-Chênes, Thônex
Attendance: 3,259
Referee: (Switzerland) Bruno Grossen

FCB without Huggel, Gimenez and Delgado (all injured), Murat Yakin and Hakan Yakin (both rested), and Ergic (long-term illness). In the 80th minute, Rahali failed to convert a penalty —awarded following a foul— as FCB goalkeeper Zuberbühler held. Lyon's Brazilien World Cup winner Edmilson took the kick-off. Alinghi boss Ernesto Bertarelli was among the spectators.

== Round 3 ==
=== Summary ===
Team 1	Score	Team 2
8 November 2003
FC Winterthur	2–3	Neuchâtel Xamax FC
FC Tuggen	1–2	FC Meyrin
Yverdon-Sport FC	0–1	FC Wil
9 November 2003
FC Aarau	1–2 (a.e.t.)	FC St. Gallen
FC Herisau	2–4	FC Zürich
FC Bulle	0–4	FC Thun
Grasshoppers	1–0	FC Basel
FC Malcantone Agno	2–1	BSC Young Boys

=== Matches ===
9 November 2003
14:30

Aarau	1–2 (a.e.t.)	St. Gallen
Vanetta 35' (1:0); Varela (yellow card); Vanetta (yellow card); Citko (yellow card) de Napoli (yellow card); Christ (yellow card)	FCA summary	90' (1:1) Bättig; 116' (1:2) Merenda; (yellow card) Tachie-Mensah

Stadion Brügglifeld, Aarau
Attendance: 3,500
Referee: (Switzerland) Guido Wildhaber (Kerzers)

9 November 2003
14:30

Herisau	2–4	Zürich
Knaus (yellow card) 33'; Gambino (yellow card) 37'; Barrasa 54' (1:3); Lapcevic 85' (2:5)	FCZ summary	16' (o.g.) (Cipriano); 35' (0:2) Guerrero; 38' (0:3) Iodice; (yellow card) 43' Simo; (yellow card) 68' Matić; 77' (1:4) Chihab; (yellow card) 85' Buess

Ebnet, Herisau
Attendance: 3,000
Referee: (Switzerland) Daniel Wermelinger (Aarau)

FC Herisau played the 2003/04 season in the 2. Liga Interregional (fourth-tier).

9 November 2003
14:30

Grasshoppers	1–0	Basel
Petrić (yellow card); Eduardo 63' (1:0); Opabunmi (yellow card) 83'	FCB summary	(yellow card) 22' Atouba; (yellow card) 24' Streller; (yellow card) 61' D. Degen; (yellow card) 79' Chipperfield

Hardturm, Zürich
Attendance: 13,100
Referee: (Switzerland) Markus Nobs (Wohlen bei Bern)

GC without Gamboa, Shala, Tararache, and Castillo (all injured); FCB without Esposito, Tum, Cantaluppi, and Delgado (all injured), and Ergic (long-term illness).

9 November 2003

FC Malcantone Agno	2–1	Young Boys
Angeretti 1' (1:0); Morf (yellow card) 14'; Lodigiani 59' (2:0)	summary	(yellow card) 45' Eugster; 75' (2:1) Häberli; (yellow card) 90+1' Häberli

Cornaredo, Lugano
Attendance: 1,279
Referee: (Switzerland) Urs Meier (Wettingen and Würenlos)

Malcantone Agno without Abächerli and Padalino (injured). Young Boys without Berisha, Descloux, Eseosa and Magnin (all four injured).

== Quarter-finals ==
=== Summary ===
Team 1	Score	Team 2
7 December 2003
FC Malcantone Agno	0–2	FC Wil
FC Meyrin	0–3	FC Zürich
Neuchâtel Xamax FC	0–3	Grasshoppers
FC Thun	2–2 (a.e.t.) (p. 5–6)	FC St. Gallen

=== Matches ===
7 December 2003
14:30
Quarter-final

Meyrin	0–3	Zürich
Yoksuzoglu (yellow card) 16'; Girod (yellow card) 63'; Brunner (yellow card) 74'	FCZ summary	10' (0:1) Guerrero; 23' (0:2) Petrosyan; (yellow card) 53' Muff; (yellow card) 55' Petrosyan; (yellow card) 66' Nef; 70' (0:3) Petrosyan

Stade du Bois-Carré, Meyrin
Attendance: 2,550
Referee: (Switzerland) Claudio Circhetta (Muttenz)

FC Meyrin played the 2003/04 season in the Challenge League (second-tier).

== Semi-finals ==
=== Summary ===
Team 1	Score	Team 2
3 March 2004
Grasshoppers	6–5 (a.e.t.)	FC Zürich
4 March 2004
FC St. Gallen	1–2	FC Wil

=== Matches ===
3 March 2004
20:15

Grasshopper Club	6–5 (a.e.t.)	Zürich
Petrić 37' (1:2); Cabanas (yellow card) 45'; Eduardo 57' (2:3); Eduardo 83' (3:5); Eduardo 89' (3:5); Petrić 90+2' (5:5); Núñez 95' (6:5)	FCZ summary	6' (0:1) Gygax; 11' (o.g.) (Ziegler); (yellow card) 19' César; 44' (1:3) Gygax; 61' (2:4) Gygax; 63' (2:5) César; (yellow card) (yellow-red card) 63' César; (yellow card) 112' Chihab; (yellow card) 117' Gygax

Hardturm, Zürich
Attendance: 11,200
Referee: (Switzerland) Urs Meier (Wettingen and Würenlos)

César received his second yellow card because of his excessive goal celebration.

== Final ==
The winners of the first drawn semi-final was considered as home team in the final.

=== Summary ===
Team 1	Score	Team 2
12 April 2004
Grasshopper Club	2–3	FC Wil

=== Matches ===
12 April 2004
15:00

Grasshoppers	2–3	FC Wil
Núñez 8'; Cabanas 19'; Tararache (yellow card) 25'; Lichtsteiner (yellow card) 39'; Spycher (yellow card) 62'; Mitreski (yellow card) 78'	SFL summary	5' Rogerio; 30' (pen.), 79' (pen.) Fabinho; (yellow card) 78' Blunschi

St. Jakob-Park, Basel
Attendance: 22,500
Referee: (Switzerland) Guido Wildhaber (Kerzers)

Wil won the cup and this was their first trophy in Swiss football to this date.
