= 2003–04 BSC Young Boys season =

Young Boys
2003–04 season
- Chairman: Peter Mast
- Manager: Hans-Peter Zaugg
- Stadium: Wankdorf Stadium
- Swiss Super League: 2nd
- Swiss Cup: Round of 16
- UEFA Cup: Qualifying round
- Top goalscorer: League: Stéphane Chapuisat (23); All: Stéphane Chapuisat (23)
- Average home league attendance: 7,869

The 2003–04 BSC Young Boys season was the club's 106th season in existence and the club's third consecutive season in the top flight of Swiss football. In addition to the domestic league, Young Boys participated in this season's editions of the Swiss Cup and the UEFA Cup.

== Pre-season and friendlies ==
Win Draw Loss

== Competitions ==
=== Overall record ===
| Competition | First match | Last match | Starting round | Final position | Record | | | | | | | |
| Competition | First match | Last match | Starting round | Final position | Pld | W | D | L | GF | GA | GD | Win % |
|---|---|---|---|---|---|---|---|---|---|---|---|---|
| Swiss Super League | 16 July 2003 | 22 May 2004 | Matchday 1 | 2nd | 36 | 22 | 6 | 8 | 75 | 48 | +27 | 61.11 |
| Swiss Cup | 21 September 2003 | 9 November 2003 | Round 1 | Round 3 | 3 | 2 | 0 | 1 | 7 | 2 | +5 | 66.67 |
| UEFA Cup | 14 August 2003 | 28 August 2004 | Qualifying round | Qualifying round | 2 | 0 | 1 | 1 | 4 | 5 | −1 | 0.00 |
| Total | | | | | 41 | 24 | 7 | 10 | 86 | 55 | +31 | 58.54 |

Source: Competitions

=== Swiss Super League ===
==== League table ====
| Pos | Team | Pld | W | D | L | GF | GA | GD | Pts | Qualification or relegation |
|---|---|---|---|---|---|---|---|---|---|---|
| 1 | Basel (C) | 36 | 26 | 7 | 3 | 86 | 32 | +54 | 85 | Qualification to Champions League third qualifying round |
| 2 | Young Boys | 36 | 22 | 6 | 8 | 75 | 48 | +27 | 72 | Qualification to Champions League second qualifying round |
| 3 | Servette | 36 | 15 | 7 | 14 | 61 | 62 | −1 | 52 | Qualification to UEFA Cup second qualifying round |
| 4 | Zürich | 36 | 14 | 8 | 14 | 58 | 52 | +6 | 50 | |
| 5 | St. Gallen | 36 | 14 | 8 | 14 | 54 | 57 | −3 | 50 | |

Source: RSSSF
Rules for classification: 1) points; 2) goal difference; 3) number of goals scored.
(C) Champions

==== Results summary ====
| Overall | | | | | | | | Home | | | | | | Away | | | | | |
| Pld | W | D | L | GF | GA | GD | Pts | W | D | L | GF | GA | GD | W | D | L | GF | GA | GD |
|---|---|---|---|---|---|---|---|---|---|---|---|---|---|---|---|---|---|---|---|
| 36 | 22 | 6 | 8 | 75 | 48 | +27 | 72 | 12 | 4 | 2 | 41 | 20 | +21 | 10 | 2 | 6 | 34 | 28 | +6 |

==== Results by round ====
| Round | 1 | 2 | 3 | 4 | 5 | 6 | 7 | 8 | 9 | 10 | 11 | 12 | 13 | 14 | 15 | 16 | 17 | 18 | 19 | 20 | 21 | 22 | 23 | 24 | 25 | 26 | 27 | 28 | 29 | 30 | 31 | 32 | 33 | 34 | 35 | 36 |
|---|---|---|---|---|---|---|---|---|---|---|---|---|---|---|---|---|---|---|---|---|---|---|---|---|---|---|---|---|---|---|---|---|---|---|---|---|
| Ground | A | H | H | A | H | A | H | A | H | H | A | A | H | A | H | A | H | A | H | A | H | A | H | A | H | H | A | H | A | A | H | A | H | A | H | A |
| Result | W | L | W | W | W | L | W | L | W | D | L | W | W | W | W | W | W | D | L | W | D | W | D | W | W | D | L | W | L | W | W | W | W | D | W | L |
| Position | 1 | 5 | 3 | 3 | 2 | 2 | 2 | 2 | 2 | 2 | 3 | 3 | 3 | 3 | 2 | 2 | 2 | 2 | 2 | 2 | 2 | 2 | 2 | 2 | 2 | 2 | 2 | 2 | 2 | 2 | 2 | 2 | 2 | 2 | 2 | 2 |

A = Away; H = Home; W = Win; D = Draw; L = Loss

==== Matches ====
| 16 July 2003 1 | St. Gallen | 1–4 | Young Boys | St. Gallen |
| CEST (UTC+2) |

| 22 July 2003 2 | Young Boys | 2–3 | Basel | Bern |
| CEST (UTC+2) | | | | Stadium: Wankdorf Stadium |

| 26 July 2003 3 | Young Boys | 2–1 | Zürich | Bern |
| CEST (UTC+2) | | | | Stadium: Wankdorf Stadium |

| 2 August 2003 4 | Neuchâtel Xamax | 1–2 | Young Boys | Xamax |
| CEST (UTC+2) |

| 9 August 2003 5 | Young Boys | 2–1 | Wil | Bern |
| CEST (UTC+2) | | | | Stadium: Wankdorf Stadium |

| 17 August 2003 6 | Aarau | 3–1 | Young Boys | Aarau |
| CEST (UTC+2) |

| 22 August 2003 7 | Young Boys | 2–1 | Thun | Bern |
| CEST (UTC+2) | | | | Stadium: Wankdorf Stadium |

| 31 August 2003 8 | Servette | 4–1 | Young Boys | Geneva |
| CEST (UTC+2) |

| 3 September 2003 9 | Young Boys | 4–0 | Grasshopper | Bern |
| CEST (UTC+2) | | | | Stadium: Wankdorf Stadium |

| 14 September 2003 10 | Young Boys | 0–0 | St. Gallen | Bern |
| CEST (UTC+2) | | | | Stadium: Wankdorf Stadium |

| 28 September 2003 11 | Basel | 2–0 | Young Boys | Basel |
| CEST (UTC+2) |

| 5 October 2003 13 | Young Boys | 2–1 | Neuchâtel Xamax | Bern |
| CEST (UTC+2) | | | | Stadium: Wankdorf Stadium |

| 15 October 2003 12 | Zürich | 0–2 | Young Boys | Zürich |
| CEST (UTC+2) |

| 26 October 2003 14 | Wil | 0–1 | Young Boys | Wil |
| CEST (UTC+2) |

| 29 October 2003 15 | Young Boys | 5–3 | Aarau | Bern |
| CEST (UTC+2) | | | | Stadium: Wankdorf Stadium |

| 2 November 2003 16 | Thun | 1–3 | Young Boys | Thun |
| CET (UTC+1) |

| 23 November 2003 17 | Young Boys | 3–0 | Servette | Bern |
| CET (UTC+1) | | | | Stadium: Wankdorf Stadium |

| 30 November 2003 18 | Grasshopper | 3–3 | Young Boys | Zürich |
| CET (UTC+1) |

| 15 February 2004 19 | Young Boys | 0–1 | Basel | Bern |
| CET (UTC+1) | | | | Stadium: Wankdorf Stadium |

| 22 February 2004 20 | St. Gallen | 1–3 | Young Boys | St. Gallen |
| CET (UTC+1) |

| 29 February 2004 21 | Young Boys | 2–2 | Zürich | Bern |
| CET (UTC+1) | | | | Stadium: Wankdorf Stadium |

| 7 March 2004 22 | Neuchâtel Xamax | 0–3 | Young Boys | Xamax |
| CET (UTC+1) |

| 14 March 2004 23 | Young Boys | 2–2 | Aarau | Bern |
| CET (UTC+1) | | | | Stadium: Wankdorf Stadium |

| 17 March 2004 24 | Wil | 1–3 | Young Boys | Schaffhausen |
| CET (UTC+1) |

| 21 March 2004 25 | Young Boys | 4–2 | Servette | Bern |
| CET (UTC+1) | | | | Stadium: Wankdorf Stadium |

| 28 March 2004 26 | Young Boys | 0–0 | Thun | Bern |
| CEST (UTC+2) | | | | Stadium: Wankdorf Stadium |

| 4 April 2004 27 | Grasshopper | 4–2 | Young Boys | Zürich |
| CEST (UTC+2) |

| 7 April 2004 28 | Young Boys | 1–0 | Grasshopper | Bern |
| CEST (UTC+2) | | | | Stadium: Wankdorf Stadium |

| 15 April 2004 29 | Thun | 3–0 | Young Boys | Thun |
| CEST (UTC+2) |

| 18 April 2004 30 | Servette | 0–2 | Young Boys | Servette |
| CEST (UTC+2) |

| 24 April 2004 31 | Young Boys | 5–1 | Wil | Bern |
| CEST (UTC+2) | | | | Stadium: Wankdorf Stadium |

| 1 May 2004 32 | Aarau | 0–1 | Young Boys | Aarau |
| CEST (UTC+2) |

| 9 May 2004 33 | Young Boys | 3–1 | Neuchâtel Xamax | Bern |
| CEST (UTC+2) | | | | Stadium: Wankdorf Stadium |

| 12 May 2004 34 | Zürich | 2–2 | Young Boys | Zürich |
| CEST (UTC+2) |

| 15 May 2004 35 | Young Boys | 2–1 | St. Gallen | Bern |
| CEST (UTC+2) | | | | Stadium: Wankdorf Stadium |

| 22 May 2004 36 | Basel | 2–1 | Young Boys | Basel |
| CEST (UTC+2) |

=== Swiss Cup ===
| 21 September 2003 Round 1 | Collombey | 0–2 | Young Boys | Collombey-Muraz |
| 16:15 CEST (UTC+2) | | | | Stadium: Stade des Perraires |

| 19 October 2003 Round 2 | La Chaux-De-Fonds | 0–4 | Young Boys | La Chaux-De-Fonds |
| 14:30 CEST (UTC+2) | | | | Stadium: Stade de la Charrière |

| 9 November 2003 Round 3 | FC Malcantone Agno | 2–1 | Young Boys | Lugano |
| 14:30 CET (UTC+1) | | | | Stadium: Centro Sportivo Passera |

=== UEFA Cup ===
==== Qualifying round ====
| 14 August 2003 First leg | MyPa (Finland) | 3–2 | (Switzerland) Young Boys | Kouvola, Finland |
| CEST (UTC+2) | | | | Stadium: Kymenlaakson Sähkö Stadion |

| 28 August 2003 Second leg | Young Boys (Switzerland) | 2–2 (4–5 agg.) | (Finland) MyPa | Bern |
| CEST (UTC+2) | | | | Stadium: Wankdorf Stadium |
