= Yane =

Yane (Bulgarian: Яне, Macedonian: Јане) is a given name and may refer to:

- Yane Marques (born 1994), Brazilian modern pentathlete
- Yane Sandanski (1872–1915), Macedonian Bulgarian revolutionary
- Yane Yanev (born 1971), Bulgarian politician
- Yane Bugnard (born 1974), Swiss footballer
