= Edílson (given name) =

Edílson (born 1971) is a Brazilian footballer.

Edílson may also refer to:

- Edílson Pereira de Carvalho (born 1962), Brazilian football referee
- Alexandre Edílson de Freitas (born 1976), Brazilian footballer
- Edílson José da Silva (born 1978), Brazilian footballer
- Edílson Mendes Guimarães (born 1986), Brazilian footballer
