= Gaspoz =

Gaspoz is a surname. Notable people with the surname include:

- Alain Gaspoz (born 1970), Swiss footballer
- Joël Gaspoz (born 1962), Swiss alpine skier
