= Daniel Senn =

Swiss footballer (born 1983)

Personal information
- Full name: Daniel Senn
- Date of birth: 17 September 1983 (age 43)
- Place of birth: Switzerland
- Height: 1.77 m (5 ft 9 1/2 in)
- Position: Midfielder

Team information
- Current team: FC Tuggen
- Number: 11

Youth career
- FC St. Gallen

Senior career*
Years	Team	Apps	(Gls)
2002–2003	FC St. Gallen	6	(2)
2003–2006	FC Schaffhausen	72	(10)
2007–2009	FC Winterthur	37	(1)
2009–	FC Tuggen		(0)

International career^{‡}
	Switzerland U-21	1	(0)
- * Club domestic league appearances and goals as of 7 October 2008 ‡ National team caps and goals as of 28 July 2006

Daniel Senn (born 17 September 1983) is a Swiss footballer who currently plays as defender for FC Tuggen.
