= 2003–04 Swiss Super League =

107th season of top-tier Swiss football

Swiss Super League
- Season: 2003–04
- Champions: Basel; 10th title
- Promoted: Schaffhausen
- Relegated: Wil
- Champions League: Basel; Young Boys
- UEFA Cup: Servette
- Intertoto Cup: Thun
- Matches: 180
- Goals: 587 (3.26 per match)
- Top goalscorer: Stéphane Chapuisat (23)
- Biggest home win: Basel 6–0 Servette; Basel 6–0 Neuchâtel Xamax
- Biggest away win: Thun 0–4 Basel; Grasshopper 0–4 Basel
- Highest scoring: Basel 5–2 Grasshopper (7 goals)
- Longest winning run: Basel (19)
- Longest unbeaten run: Basel (19)
- Longest winless run: Wil (8)
- Longest losing run: Wil (8)
- Average attendance: 8,990

The 2003–04 Swiss Super League was the 107th season of top-division football in Switzerland. The competition was officially named the AXPO Super League due to sponsoring purposes. It began on 16 July 2003 and has ended on 23 May 2004. This was the first season known as Swiss Super League.

== Overview ==
It was contested by 10 teams, and FC Basel won the championship.

== League standings ==
Pos	Team	Pld	W	D	L	GF	GA	GD	Pts	Qualification or relegation
1	Basel (C)	36	26	7	3	86	32	+54	85	Qualification to Champions League third qualifying round
2	Young Boys	36	22	6	8	75	48	+27	72	Qualification to Champions League second qualifying round
3	Servette	36	15	7	14	61	62	−1	52	Qualification to UEFA Cup second qualifying round
4	Zürich	36	14	8	14	58	52	+6	50	
5	St. Gallen	36	14	8	14	54	57	−3	50	
6	Thun	36	13	10	13	51	57	−6	49	Qualification to Intertoto Cup second round
7	Grasshopper	36	12	5	19	62	74	−12	41	
8	Aarau	36	9	11	16	57	69	−12	38	
9	Neuchâtel Xamax	36	10	6	20	46	63	−17	36	Qualification to relegation play-off
10	Wil (R)	36	7	8	21	37	73	−36	29	Relegation to Swiss Challenge League

Source: RSSSF
Rules for classification: 1) points; 2) goal difference; 3) number of goals scored.
(C) Champions; (R) Relegated

== Results ==
Teams play each other four times in this league. In the first half of the season each team played every other team twice (home and away) and then do the same in the second half of the season.

=== First half of season ===
Home \ Away	AAR	BAS	GCZ	NEU	SER	STG	THU	WIL	YB	ZÜR
Aarau		2–2	2–1	1–1	1–1	3–1	1–2	1–1	3–1	3–3
Basel	3–1		5–2	4–2	6–0	4–1	2–0	4–0	2–0	2–1
Grasshopper	2–3	0–4		0–1	1–1	5–2	2–1	5–3	3–3	1–0
Neuchâtel Xamax	0–1	1–3	3–1		2–3	2–0	0–1	0–0	1–2	2–1
Servette	3–1	1–2	3–2	1–0		1–3	5–1	3–1	4–1	3–1
St. Gallen	0–0	1–2	1–2	3–1	1–0		1–1	4–1	1–4	2–1
Thun	1–1	0–4	3–2	0–0	1–1	1–1		3–2	1–3	2–0
Wil	1–0	2–3	2–1	1–1	2–2	2–0	1–1		0–1	2–1
Young Boys	5–3	2–3	4–0	2–1	3–0	0–0	2–1	2–1		2–1
Zürich	4–2	0–1	0–2	3–1	0–1	2–2	4–0	3–1	0–2	

Legend: Blue = home team win; Yellow = draw; Red = away team win.

=== Second half of season ===
Home \ Away	AAR	BAS	GCZ	NEU	SER	STG	THU	WIL	YB	ZÜR
Aarau		3–0	2–2	2–0	0–1	3–0	1–2	4–0	0–1	2–4
Basel	3–1		2–2	6–0	1–0	0–0	1–1	2–0	2–1	1–1
Grasshopper	4–1	0–2		1–0	1–5	3–2	2–3	1–2	4–2	1–2
Neuchâtel Xamax	4–1	3–1	2–1		6–1	0–1	1–1	0–2	0–3	4–2
Servette	1–1	1–4	3–0	2–2		3–1	3–1	1–1	0–2	2–3
St. Gallen	2–0	1–1	2–1	3–1	2–0		2–1	4–0	1–3	1–3
Thun	6–3	0–2	1–2	2–3	2–1	2–3		2–0	3–0	2–1
Wil	1–1	1–1	1–5	3–0	0–2	0–2	0–2		1–3	0–1
Young Boys	2–2	0–1	1–0	3–1	4–2	2–1	0–0	5–1		2–2
Zürich	4–1	1–0	0–0	1–0	2–0	2–2	0–0	2–1	2–2	

Legend: Blue = home team win; Yellow = draw; Red = away team win.

== Relegation play-offs ==
29 May 2004
16:05 CEST

Neuchatel Xamax	2–0	Vaduz
Forschelet 28'; Rey 50'

Stade de la Maladière, Neuchâtel
Attendance: 9,400
Referee: Carlo Bertolini

31 May 2004
14:15 CEST

Vaduz	2–1	Neuchatel Xamax
Burgmeier 12'; Gohouri 35'		M'Futi 55'

Rheinpark Stadion, Vaduz
Attendance: 3,800
Referee: Urs Meier

Neuchatel Xamax won 3–2 on aggregate.

== Season statistics ==
=== Top goalscorers ===
Rank	Player	Club	Goals
1.	(Switzerland) Stéphane Chapuisat	Young Boys	23
2.	(Togo) Mohamed Kader	Servette	19
3.	(Brazil) Leandro Fonseca	Young Boys	17
3.	(Uruguay) Richard Núñez	Grasshoppers	17
3.	(Ghana) Alex Tachie-Mensah	St. Gallen	17
6.	(Romania) Ionel Gane	Grasshoppers	16
6.	(Argentina) Christian Giménez	Basel	16
8.	(Armenia) Arthur Petrosyan	Zürich	13
8.	(Switzerland) Marco Streller	Basel	13
10.	(Switzerland) Rainer Bieli	Aarau	12
10.	(Democratic Republic of the Congo) Mobulu M'Futi	Neuchâtel Xamax	12

== Attendances ==
#	Club	Average
1	Basel	27,886
2	Servette	9,202
3	St. Gallen	8,794
4	GCZ	8,087
5	Zürich	7,889
6	Young Boys	7,869
7	Xamax	6,617
8	Aarau	5,594
9	Thun	4,534
10	Wil	3,445

== Sources ==
- RSSSF
