= Allmir Ademi =

Albanian-Swiss footballer (born 1984)

Personal information
- Date of birth: 13 October 1984 (age 42)
- Place of birth: Pristina, Yugoslavia
- Height: 1.77 m (5 ft 9 1/2 in)
- Position: Midfielder

Team information
- Current team: VFC Neuhausen 90

Senior career*
Years	Team	Apps	(Gls)
2002–2003	FC Schaffhausen	2	(0)
2003–2004	Grasshoppers	1	(0)
2004–2006	FC Schaffhausen	46	(3)
2006	FC Wil	10	(2)
2007–2010	FC Schaffhausen	98	(17)
2010	Eintracht Trier	0	(0)
2010–2011	SV Schaffhausen	5	(2)
2011–2015	FC Beringen		
2019–	VFC Neuhausen 90		
- * Club domestic league appearances and goals as of 10 September 2007

Allmir Ademi (Serbo-Croat: Almir Ademi; born 13 October 1984) is an Albanian-Swiss footballer who plays as midfielder for Swiss club VFC Neuhausen 90.
