= Patrick de Napoli =

Swiss footballer (born 1975)

Personal information
- Date of birth: 17 November 1975 (age 50)
- Place of birth: Baar, Switzerland
- Height: 5 ft 11 in (1.80 m)
- Positions: Attacking midfielder; forward

Youth career
- 1983–1991: FC Baar

Senior career*
| Years | Team | Apps | (Gls) |
| 1991–1996 | Grasshopper Club Zürich | 44 | (4) |
| 1996 | FC Winterthur | 13 | (5) |
| 1996–1998 | FC Aarau | 68 | (20) |
| 1998–1999 | Grasshopper Club Zürich | 39 | (14) |
| 2000 | Karlsruher SC | 12 | (1) |
| 2000–2004 | FC Aarau | 120 | (31) |
| 2004–2005 | BSC Young Boys | 20 | (1) |
| 2005–2006 | FC Luzern | 15 | (5) |
| 2006–2007 | FC Carl Zeiss Jena | 13 | (1) |
| 2007 | → Chemnitzer FC (loan) | 14 | (3) |
| 2007 | FC Carl Zeiss Jena II | 3 | (0) |
| 2007–2009 | Zug 94 | 40 | (23) |
| 2009–2011 | FC Baar | 10 | (3) |
| 2011–2012 | SC Menzingen | 5 | (4) |

International career
| 1992–1994 | Switzerland under-19 | 7 | (7) |
| 1994–1998 | Switzerland under-21 | 11 | (6) |
| 1997–1999 | Switzerland | 4 | (0) |

Managerial career
- 2009–2011: FC Baar (player–manager)
- * Club domestic league appearances and goals

Patrick de Napoli (born 17 November 1975) is a retired footballer from Switzerland who is also of Italian descent. He primarily played as a forward but also played as an attacking midfielder for a variety of clubs in Switzerland and Germany as well as the Switzerland national football team. De Napoli last played for SC Menzingen of the Swiss 3. Liga in April 2012, having also played in the top division for clubs such as Grasshopper Club Zürich, Karlsruher SC and BSC Young Boys and been player–manager of FC Baar. De Napoli made over four hundred league appearances and scored over one hundred league goals, with almost half of these tallies coming from two spells at FC Aarau.

He has represented Switzerland at under-19, under-21 and senior levels, playing international football between 1992 and 1999. De Napoli scored seven times for the under-19 side and six times for the under-21s, but he failed to find the net in his four senior appearances, which included FIFA World Cup and UEFA Euro 2000 qualifiers.

== Club career ==
=== Grasshopper Club Zürich ===
De Napoli has said he has been playing football from the age of six. He played youth football for FC Baar until 1991, when he joined Grasshoppers. Patrick began his senior career with Grasshopper Club Zürich in the Swiss Super League in the 1991–92 season, making his debut in a 2–1 win over FC Servette on 1 March 1992 at the age of sixteen. Grasshoppers finished in third place in the league that season. In the 1992–93 season, de Napoli only made two league appearances as Grasshoppers finished ninth in the regular season and were sucked into a promotion-relegation group. The club also reached the final of the Swiss Cup, but were beaten 4–1 by FC Lugano. 1993–94 proved to be more successful for both de Napoli and Grasshoppers as the club finished second in the Swiss Super League, just one point behind winners Servette FC, with de Napoli making seven league appearances. Grasshoppers again reached the final of the Swiss Cup and this time defeated FC Schaffhausen 4–0. De Napoli improved again in 1994–1995, making thirteen appearances and scoring one goal, the first of his senior career. Grasshoppers came close to doing a league and cup double, winning the Swiss Super League and reaching the cup final for the third consecutive tournament. However, they were beaten 4–2 by FC Sion. 1995–96 saw Patrick make nineteen appearances in his last season with Grasshopper Club, scoring three times. Grasshoppers again won the league title but were eliminated in the early rounds of the cup. Patrick played in UEFA Champions League games against Ferencvárosi TC, Real Madrid (twice) and AFC Ajax, coming on as a substitute in all four matches. Midway through the 1995–96 season, de Napoli left Grasshoppers to join FC Winterthur of the Nationalliga B, the Swiss second division. Ironically, his last season with the club proved to be the one in which he made the most appearances and scored the most goals in his five-year spell with Grasshoppers.

=== FC Winterthur and FC Aarau ===
Joining FC Winterthur midway through the season, de Napoli found himself in a relegation group in the bottom half of Nationalliga B. De Napoli helped steer his new club to safety, as they topped the relegation group with Patrick scoring five times in thirteen games and Winterthur losing just two of their fourteen matches. Despite becoming an important part of Winterthur's team in such a short period of time, de Napoli moved on again at the end of the 1995–96 season, this time joining FC Aarau, who had just finished fourth in the Nationalliga A, thereby qualifying for the 1996-97 UEFA Cup. Aarau finished fifth in the 1996–97 Nationalliga A, with de Napoli missing just one of their thirty-six games and weighing in with thirteen goals, a career best. This goal haul included eight in the first twenty-two games, making him the league's joint-seventh top-scorer for the Qualifying Phase and indeed the seventh top-scorer of the overall season. He also featured for Aarau in the UEFA Cup, playing in both legs of the 7–0 aggregate loss to Brøndby IF of Denmark in September 1996.

Aarau improved on their league position in 1997–98, finishing fourth, but de Napoli had a less successful season. He still managed seven goals in thirty-three games, but could not match the impressive strike rate of the previous campaign. 1997–98 would be de Napoli's last season for FC Aarau, as he departed the club to join FC Zürich, who had finished sixth in Nationalliga A in 1997–98.

=== FC Zürich, return to Grasshoppers and Karlsruher SC ===
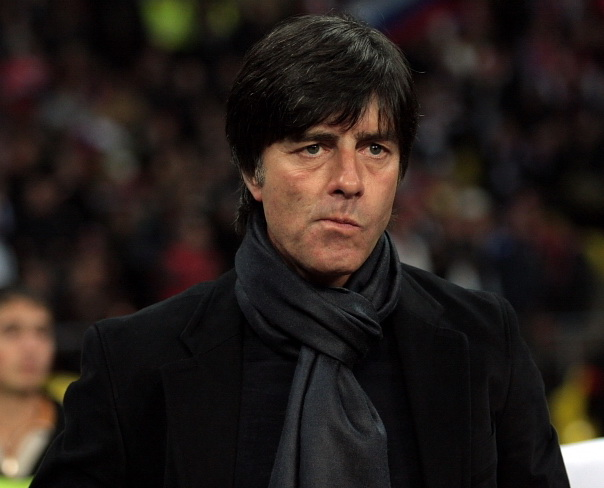
Joachim Löw managed de Napoli at Karlsruher SC

De Napoli's choice to move to FC Zürich ahead of the 1998–99 Nationalliga A proved to be successful. Zürich finished in fourth place while Aarau were sucked into a relegation battle. The striker also experienced the best strike rate of his career, scoring thirteen times in just twenty-eight games. As a result, he was the league's joint-second top-scorer, tied with Zürich teammate Shaun Bartlett. Despite this success, Patrick left the club at the end of the season to rejoin Grasshopper Club Zürich. In what was becoming a familiar pattern in de Napoli's career, he only stayed at Grasshoppers for a year before moving on again. 1999–2000 saw Grasshoppers finish fourth with de Napoli scoring once in eleven games. He left the club midway through the season to join the first foreign club of his career, German 1999–2000 2. Fußball-Bundesliga strugglers Karlsruher SC, who were then managed by future Germany national team boss Joachim Löw. The forward made his debut for Karlsruher SC in a 0–0 draw with Rot-Weiß Oberhausen on 9 February 2000. De Napoli fractured his thumb soon after joining the club, and missed matches in March 2000. He played twelve of Karlsruher SC's thirty-four league games, scoring once, in a 3–1 loss to Chemnitzer FC on 9 April 2000. However, this wasn't enough to save Karlsruher SC who were relegated at the end of the season, having won just once in de Napoli's twelve appearances. Avoiding dropping down to the German third division, de Napoli returned to Switzerland to rejoin FC Aarau.

=== FC Aarau and Young Boys ===
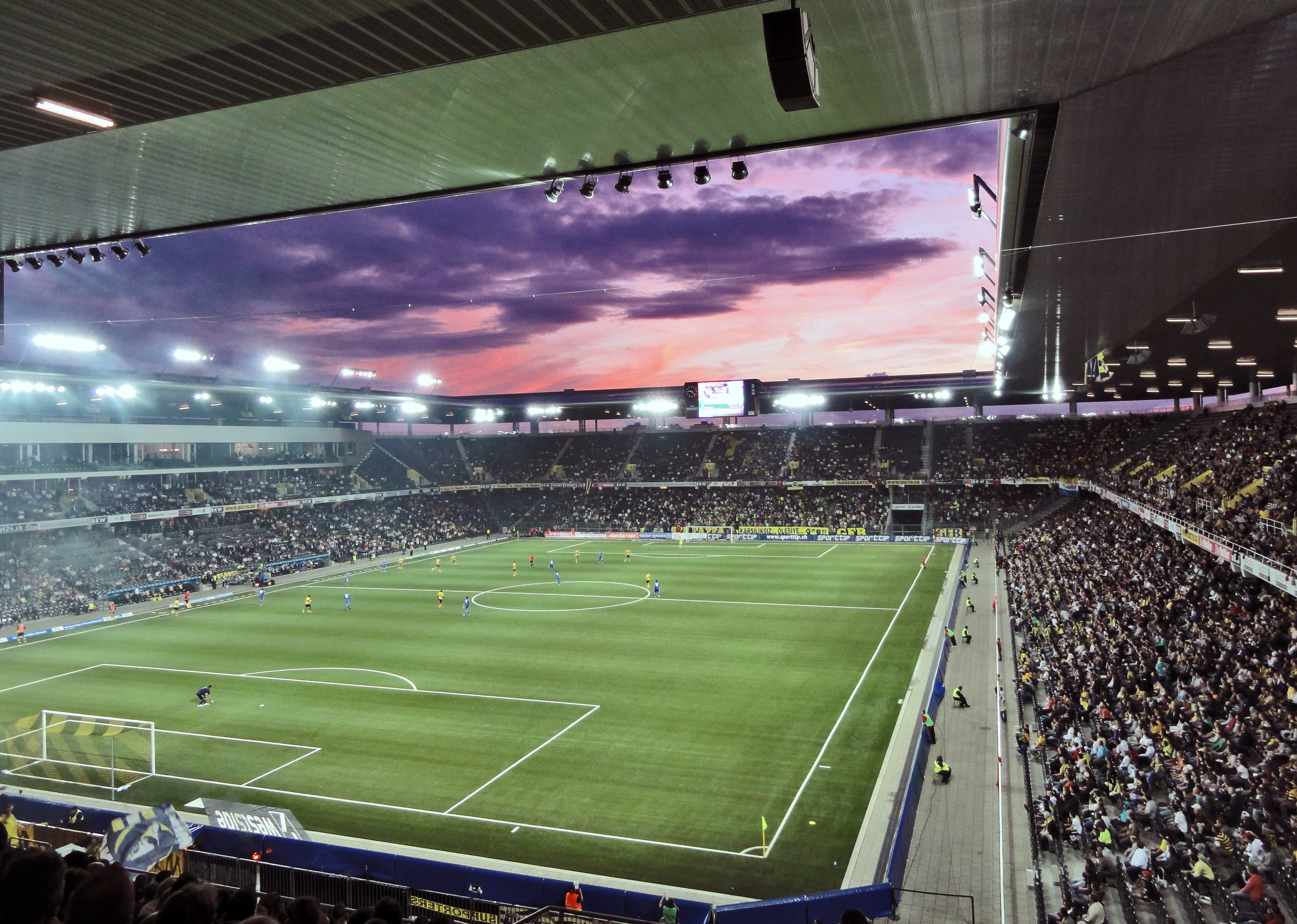
De Napoli played in the Stade de Suisse, Young Boys' new stadium's first ever match, against Olympique Marseille

De Napoli had enjoyed one of the best years of his career with Aarau in 1996–97, and he again experienced a return to form after rejoining the Aargau-based club. He scored six times in twenty-four appearances in the 2000–01 Nationalliga A as Aarau finished ninth in the regular season and second in the relegation/promotion play-offs. He again established himself as a first-team regular in 2001–02, playing thirty-four of Aarau's thirty-six games. However, he only managed four goals and Aarau were eventually relegated by just one goal, although they were later re-promoted due to FC Lausanne not obtaining a license. The 2002–03 Nationalliga A went better for both player and club as FC Aarau preserved their top-flight status and de Napoli netted thirteen times in thirty-two games. De Napoli's goal tally included vital strikes that ultimately kept them up, scoring in a 1–1 draw with BSC Young Boys, a 2–1 away win over FC Zürich and in a 2–1 victory against FC Lugano. He also scored a late winner against SR Delémont and a brace against FC Vaduz in the relegation/promotion group. Patrick scored eight times in thirty games in the 2003–04 Swiss Super League as Aarau scraped to safety once more. His goals included a brace against Zürich in a 3–3 draw on 30 August 2003 and another two goals in a 2–2 draw with FC Basel on October 26. He left Aarau at the end of the season to join BSC Young Boys, who had just finished second in the Swiss Super League.

Patrick's first season with Young Boys saw him score just once in nineteen games. He made his debut for the club in a 6–1 demolition of FC Schaffhausen in the second game of the season on 23 July 2004, coming on as a second-half substitute. De Napoli scored his first goal for Young Boys and his only goal of 2004–05 in the 4–2 home loss to FC Thun on 14 April 2005. Young Boys finished fourth in the league. De Napoli also competed in the UEFA Champions League for the first time since his Grasshoppers days, making a substitute appearance in the 3–0 second leg defeat to FK Crvena Zvezda on 4 August 2004 which eliminated Young Boys from the competition. Ahead of the 2005–06 Swiss Super League Young Boys competed in the UEFA Intertoto Cup, with de Napoli playing in their wins over Sporting Lokeren and the loss to Olympique Marseille in July 2005. However, the forward played just once for Young Boys in the league in 2005–06, coming on as a substitute in a 3–0 win over FC Yverdon-Sports on 20 July 2005. He then left for FC Luzern partway through the campaign in search of first-team football.

=== 2005–2007: Luzern, Carl Zeiss Jena and Chemnitzer FC ===
De Napoli played for FC Luzern in the second half of the 2005–06 Swiss Super League campaign, scoring five times in fifteen games and helping Luzern to promotion from the Swiss Challenge League. He scored his first goal for Luzern in a 1–1 draw at FC Chiasso on October 14, 2005. He also scored against YF Juventus, FC Winterthur, FC Sion and FC Baulmes as Luzern cruised to the league title. De Napoli scored a penalty against FC Concordia Basel in a 4–2 penalty shootout win in the second round of the Swiss Cup.

At the end of the 2005–06 season de Napoli moved to the eighth different club and the second German club of his career, FC Carl Zeiss Jena. He only stayed at Carl Zeiss Jena for part of the 2006–07 season as they narrowly avoided relegation. De Napoli scored his first goal for Carl Zeiss Jena in a 1–1 draw with SpVgg Greuther Fürth on 8 November 2006. This proved to be his only goal in thirteen games before moving on loan to Chemnitzer FC. He signed a four-month loan contract, from 1 February 2007 to 30 June, but expressed frustration at being farmed out at a time when the club as a whole were struggling at the foot of the table, and claimed "I'm probably just a scapegoat". However, Carl Zeiss Jena's management had a more positive view of the loan, with sporting director Lutz Lindemann saying "Chemnitz hope for promotion to the Regionalliga. Patrick can prove himself there and offer some help". At Chemnitzer he netted three goals in fourteen games as the club competed in the NOFV-Oberliga, Germany's fifth division. He returned to Carl Zeiss Jena, playing three games for the club's reserve team, Carl Zeiss Jena II. His contract with Carl Zeiss Jena, intended to last until the summer of 2008, was terminated with immediate effect by mutual consent on 29 August 2007. Patrick moved to Zug 94 of the Swiss third division ahead of the 2007–08 season.

=== 2007–present ===
Making his debut in a 1–0 loss to FC Biel-Bienne on 29 September 2007, De Napoli made eighteen appearances for Zug 94 in 2007–08, scoring nine goals for an impressive strike rate of a goal every other game. These goals included a run of five goals in four consecutive games, with his first goal for Zug coming in a 4–2 win over FC Luzern U21 on 7 October 2007. He followed this record up with another twenty-two appearances in 2008–09, scoring fourteen times. De Napoli netted nine times in his first eight games, scoring twice against both FC Grenchen and FC Basel U-21. He played his last game for Zug 94 in a 5–0 loss to SR Delémont on 26 April 2009.

Patrick rejoined hometown club FC Baar, where he had spent his youth career, in 2009. He adopted the role of player-coach of the team, making appearances in a 2–0 win over Schattdorf FC on 21 August 2010, and on 16 April 2011 in the 2–0 win over FC Hochdorf, setting up the first goal with a free-kick. He also scored twice in a 3–2 IFV Cup win over FC Muotathal on 5 September 2010, and was described as having "changed the game" and "made the difference". However, de Napoli was sent off for dissent in Baar's 2–1 home defeat to FC Perlen–Buchrain on 30 April 2011. Soon after this, in early June 2011, he resigned as Baar coach to join SC Menzingen of the 3. Liga. De Napoli was replaced by Daniel Stadler.

De Napoli scored in an early appearance for Menzingen, in a 1–1 draw with SC Cham II on 21 August 2011. He also played in a 4–3 to FC Muotathal on 24 September and scored in Menzingen's 4–0 rout over FC Rotkreuz on 22 October. De Napoli scored twice in the space of three minutes in a 3–2 win over Kussnacht FC on 29 October 2011. The forward played his first game after the winter break in a 2–0 win over SC Goldau II on 31 March 2012. De Napoli then started against Menzingen's 4–1 IFV Cup win over FC Gunzwil on 12 April 2012, being substituted late on in the game.

De Napoli retired from football in June 2012, at the end of the 2011–12 season.

=== Club career statistics ===
| Club | Season | League | | Cup | | Europe | | Other | | Total | | Discipline | |
| Club | Season | Apps | Goals | Apps | Goals | Apps | Goals | Apps | Goals | Apps | Goals | A yellow card | A red card |
|---|---|---|---|---|---|---|---|---|---|---|---|---|---|
| Grasshopper Club Zürich | 1991–92 | 3 | 0 | 0 | 0 | 0 | 0 | 0 | 0 | 3 | 0 | 0 | 0 |
| Grasshopper Club Zürich | 1992–93 | 2 | 0 | 0 | 0 | 0 | 0 | 0 | 0 | 2 | 0 | 0 | 0 |
| Grasshopper Club Zürich | 1993–94 | 7 | 0 | 0 | 0 | 0 | 0 | 0 | 0 | 7 | 0 | 0 | 0 |
| Grasshopper Club Zürich | 1994–95 | 13 | 1 | 1 | 0 | 0 | 0 | 0 | 0 | 14 | 1 | 0 | 0 |
| Grasshopper Club Zürich | 1995–96 | 19 | 3 | 0 | 0 | 4 | 0 | 0 | 0 | 23 | 3 | 0 | 0 |
| Grasshopper Club Zürich | Total | 44 | 4 | 1 | 0 | 4 | 0 | 0 | 0 | 49 | 4 | 0 | 0 |
| FC Winterthur | 1995–96 | 13 | 5 | 0 | 0 | 0 | 0 | 0 | 0 | 13 | 5 | 0 | 0 |
| FC Aarau | 1996–97 | 35 | 13 | 0 | 0 | 0 | 0 | 0 | 0 | 35 | 13 | 0 | 0 |
| FC Aarau | 1997–98 | 33 | 7 | 0 | 0 | 0 | 0 | 0 | 0 | 33 | 7 | 0 | 0 |
| FC Aarau | Total | 68 | 20 | 0 | 0 | 0 | 0 | 0 | 0 | 68 | 20 | 0 | 0 |
| Grasshopper Club Zürich | 1998–99 | 28 | 13 | 2 | 1 | 6 | 0 | 0 | 0 | 36 | 14 | 0 | 0 |
| Grasshopper Club Zürich | 1999–00 | 11 | 1 | 0 | 0 | 3 | 1 | 0 | 0 | 14 | 2 | 0 | 1 |
| Grasshopper Club Zürich | Total | 39 | 14 | 2 | 1 | 9 | 1 | 0 | 0 | 50 | 16 | 0 | 1 |
| Karlsruher SC | 1999–00 | 12 | 1 | 0 | 0 | 0 | 0 | 0 | 0 | 12 | 1 | 2 | 0 |
| FC Aarau | 2000–01 | 24 | 6 | 0 | 0 | 0 | 0 | 0 | 0 | 24 | 6 | 0 | 0 |
| FC Aarau | 2001–02 | 34 | 4 | 1 | 0 | 0 | 0 | 0 | 0 | 35 | 4 | 0 | 0 |
| FC Aarau | 2002–03 | 32 | 13 | 0 | 0 | 0 | 0 | 0 | 0 | 32 | 13 | 0 | 0 |
| FC Aarau | 2003–04 | 30 | 8 | 0 | 0 | 0 | 0 | 0 | 0 | 30 | 8 | 0 | 0 |
| FC Aarau | Total | 120 | 31 | 0 | 0 | 0 | 0 | 0 | 0 | 121 | 31 | 0 | 0 |
| BSC Young Boys | 2004–05 | 19 | 1 | 0 | 0 | 1 | 0 | 0 | 0 | 20 | 1 | 6 | 0 |
| BSC Young Boys | 2005–06 | 1 | 0 | 0 | 0 | 0 | 0 | 0 | 0 | 1 | 0 | 0 | 0 |
| BSC Young Boys | Total | 20 | 1 | 0 | 0 | 1 | 0 | 0 | 0 | 21 | 1 | 0 | 0 |
| FC Luzern | 2005–06 | 15 | 5 | 0 | 0 | 0 | 0 | 0 | 0 | 15 | 5 | 0 | 0 |
| FC Carl Zeiss Jena | 2006–07 | 13 | 1 | 0 | 0 | 0 | 0 | 0 | 0 | 13 | 1 | 2 | 0 |
| Chemnitzer FC (loan) | 2006–07 | 14 | 3 | 0 | 0 | 0 | 0 | 0 | 0 | 14 | 3 | 0 | 0 |
| FC Carl Zeiss Jena II | 2006–07 | 3 | 0 | 0 | 0 | 0 | 0 | 0 | 0 | 3 | 0 | 0 | 0 |
| FC Zug 94 | 2007–08 | 18 | 9 | 0 | 0 | 0 | 0 | 0 | 0 | 18 | 9 | 0 | 0 |
| FC Zug 94 | 2008–09 | 22 | 14 | 0 | 0 | 0 | 0 | 0 | 0 | 22 | 14 | 0 | 0 |
| FC Zug 94 | Total | 40 | 23 | 0 | 0 | 0 | 0 | 0 | 0 | 40 | 23 | 0 | 0 |
| FC Baar | 2009–10 | 0 | 0 | 0 | 0 | 0 | 0 | 0 | 0 | 0 | 0 | 0 | 0 |
| FC Baar | 2010–11 | 10 | 3 | 1 | 2 | 0 | 0 | 0 | 0 | 11 | 5 | 0 | 1 |
| FC Baar | Total | 10 | 3 | 1 | 2 | 0 | 0 | 0 | 0 | 11 | 5 | 0 | 1 |
| SC Menzingen | 2011–12 | 5 | 4 | 0 | 0 | 0 | 0 | 0 | 0 | 5 | 4 | 1 | 0 |
| Career Total | | 412 | 112 | 0 | 0 | 14 | 1 | 0 | 0 | 432 | 116 | 11 | 2 |

== International career ==
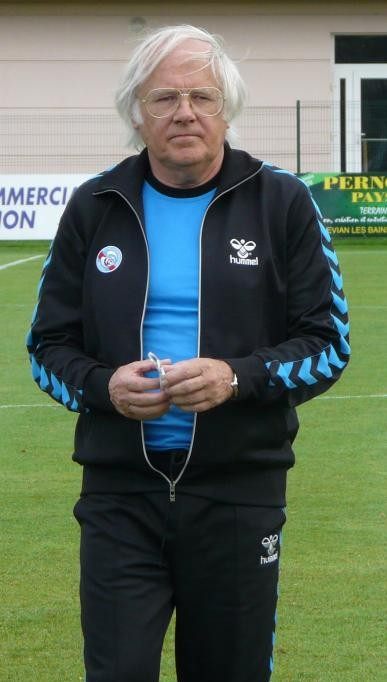
French manager Gilbert Gress, under whom de Napoli won two of his four senior caps

De Napoli played for the under-19 and under-21 teams before progressing to the senior side. He made his debut for the under-19 side in an 8–0 win over Liechtenstein under-19s on 7 October 1992, scoring Switzerland's fifth goal. De Napoli went on to score in the return fixture against Liechtenstein, another 8–0 win, on 28 October 1992. However, he had to wait five months before his next international goal, against Turkey on 4 May 1993, as Switzerland lost 2–1. De Napoli enjoyed arguably the finest moment of his under-19 career when he scored a hat-trick in a 9–0 thrashing of Armenia on 8 October 1993.

De Napoli made a total of seven appearances for the under-19s, scoring seven goals. He scored his last goal at under-19 level in his last match for the under-19s, against Sweden in a 2–1 defeat on 20 April 1994.

De Napoli then progressed to Switzerland's under-21 side, making his debut in a 2–1 victory over Iceland on 15 November 1994. De Napoli scored his first goals for the under-21s against Iceland, scoring twice in a 4–2 win on 15 August 1995. In 1996, he scored against Austria in a 3–0 win on 26 March, and against Finland in a 1–1 draw on 5 October. De Napoli also played against England in a 0–0 draw in a 1998 UEFA European Under-21 Football Championship qualifier on 1 April 1997. English newspaper The Independent described the Swiss team that night as "inspired by Patrick de Napoli" as he created a number of chances for himself and his teammates. De Napoli scored his fifth goal for the under-21s in his ninth cap, a 4–1 victory against Hungary on 29 April 1997. He played his last game for the under-21s against England under-21 in a 2–0 win on 24 March 1998, scoring his country's second goal.

The forward made his debut for the senior Switzerland side in the 2–1 loss to Russia on 10 February 1997 in the final of the Lunar New Year Cup, held in Hong Kong. He earned his second senior cap against Hungary in a 1998 FIFA World Cup qualifier on 20 August 1997. The game ended 1–1. De Napoli played once in 1998, in a 1–1 friendly draw with Yugoslavia and once in 1999, in a 1–0 win over Belarus. De Napoli came on as a substitute in all four of his international games.

=== Senior international appearances ===
| Cap | Date | Venue | Opponent | Result | Competition |
|---|---|---|---|---|---|
| 1 | 10 February 1997 | Government Stadium, Hong Kong | Russia | L 2–1 | 1997 Lunar New Year Cup |
| 2 | 20 August 1997 | Népstadion, Budapest | Hungary | D 1–1 | 1998 FIFA World Cup qualification |
| 3 | 6 June 1998 | St. Jakob Stadium, Basel | Yugoslavia | D 1–1 | Friendly |
| 4 | 27 March 1999 | Dynama Stadium, Minsk | Belarus | W 1–0 | UEFA Euro 2000 qualification |

== Personal life ==
De Napoli is married to Iris and has two children called Aurora and Alessio. Aside from football, Patrick also enjoys tennis and computing. His nickname throughout his career has been "DeNa", which is a combination of the "De" and "Na" from his surname and acts as an abbreviation. After retiring from professional football, de Napoli opened a restaurant in Baar, Switzerland, in March 2011 called "Relax". The restaurant contains a lounge and bar. De Napoli stated that he had "helped colleagues" in the industry during his playing career and it was something he was interested in. He also expressed his relief at finally becoming his own boss, saying that he had tended to have bad relationships with his managers because he is very opinionated.

In June 2012, ahead of the UEFA Euro 2012 tournament, de Napoli introduced a large screen in the bar to show matches from the competition. Despite describing Switzerland's failure to qualify as "a shame", de Napoli supported Italy in the tournament as he is of Italian descent. He marked each Italy goal by ringing a bell and giving away free beers.

As a young player at Grasshopper Club Zürich, de Napoli graduated from the Sports Business Association in Zürich, after a two-year apprenticeship. He also has a tattoo on his upper left arm.
