= Luca Denicolà =

Swiss footballer (born 1981)

Personal information
- Date of birth: 17 April 1981 (age 45)
- Place of birth: Lostallo, Switzerland
- Height: 1.83 m (6 ft 0 in)
- Position: Defender

Senior career*
| Years | Team | Apps | (Gls) |
| 1999–2002 | Grasshopper Club Zürich | 32 | (0) |
| 2002 | BSC Young Boys (loan) | 3 | (0) |
| 2003 | FC Aarau (loan) | 21 | (0) |
| 2004–2007 | Grasshopper Club Zürich | 52 | (0) |
| 2007–2010 | AC Lugano | 84 | (1) |
| 2010–2012 | FC Vaduz | 26 | (2) |

International career
| 2003–2004 | Switzerland U-21 | 7 | (0) |
- * Club domestic league appearances and goals

Luca Denicolà (born 17 April 1981) is a former footballer from Switzerland who played as defender.
