= Swen König =

Swiss footballer (born 1985)

Personal information
- Date of birth: 3 September 1985 (age 41)
- Place of birth: Switzerland
- Height: 1.83 m (6 ft 0 in)
- Position: Goalkeeper

Team information
- Current team: Switzerland (goalkeeper coach)

Senior career*
Years	Team	Apps	(Gls)
2003–2004	FC Aarau	1	(0)
2005–2006	FC Vaduz	14	(0)
2006–2007	FC Wohlen	18	(0)
2007–2010	FC Lucerne	9	(0)
2010–2011	Grasshopper	15	(0)
2011–2013	AC Bellinzona	66	(0)
2013–2014	FC Aarau	4	(0)

International career
- Switzerland U-17

Managerial career
- 2014–2017: FC Aarau (goalkeeper coach)
- 2015–XXXX: Switzerland U-20 (goalkeeper coach)
- 2017–2018: FC Luzern (goalkeeper coach)
- 2018–: Switzerland (goalkeeper coach)
Medal record
Men's football
Representing Switzerland
UEFA European Under-17 Championship
Winner	2002 Denmark
- * Club domestic league appearances and goals

Swen König (born 3 September 1985) is a retired Swiss football goalkeeper. He is currently the goalkeeper coach of Switzerland national football team.

König is a former youth international and was in the Swiss U-17 squad that won the 2002 U-17 European Championships.

== Honours ==
=== International ===
- UEFA U-17 European Champion: 2002
