= Yane Bugnard =

Swiss football midfielder (born 1974)

Personal information
- Date of birth: 24 April 1974 (age 52)
- Position: Midfielder

Senior career*
Years	Team	Apps	(Gls)
1993–1994	Étoile Carouge FC		
1994–1997	FC Lugano		
1997–1998	Étoile Carouge FC		
1998–1999	FC Sion		
1999–2001	AC Bellinzona		
2001–2002	FC Locarno		
2002–2003	FC Lugano		
2003–2004	FC Malcantone		
2004–1995	AC Lugano		
2005–2008	FC Lausanne-Sport		
- * Club domestic league appearances and goals

Yane Bugnard (born 24 April 1974) is a retired Swiss football midfielder.
