= Jean-Pierre Tcheutchoua =

Cameroonian footballer

Personal information
- Full name: Jean-Pierre Tcheutchoua
- Date of birth: 12 December 1980 (age 45)
- Place of birth: Cameroon
- Height: 1.83 m (6 ft 0 in)
- Position: Defender

Senior career*
Years	Team	Apps	(Gls)
2000–2003	FC Sion	57	(3)
2003–2007	FC Aarau	72	(4)
2007	FC UGS	7	(0)
2007–2008	FC Gossau	7	(1)
2008–2009	FC Concordia Basel	22	(0)
2009–2010	FC Gossau	9	(0)
2010	FC UGS	29	(1)

International career
2007	Cameroon	1	(0)
- * Club domestic league appearances and goals

Jean-Pierre Tcheutchoua (born 12 December 1980) is a footballer from Cameroon who currently plays as defender.
