= Thomas Häberli =

Swiss footballer (born 1974)

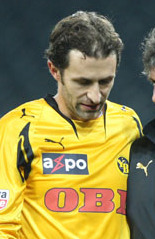
- Häberli with Young Boys in 2008

Personal information
- Date of birth: 11 April 1974 (age 52)
- Place of birth: Lucerne, Switzerland
- Height: 1.82 m (6 ft 0 in)
- Position: Striker

Youth career
- 1982–1987: FC Eschenbach
- 1987–1994: Hochdorf

Senior career*
Years	Team	Apps	(Gls)
1994	Le Mont	4	(0)
1995	Lausanne-Sport	0	(0)
1996–1997	Hochdorf	22	(9)
1997–1999	Schötz	51	(21)
1999	Kriens	22	(8)
2000	Basel	8	(0)
2000–2009	Young Boys	217	(52)
Total		324	(90)

International career
2004	Switzerland	1	(0)

Managerial career
- 2009–2010: FC Perlen-Buchrain
- 2010–2012: Young Boys (U-18)
- 2011: Young Boys (caretaker)
- 2012–2013: Young Boys (assistant)
- 2013: Young Boys (U-21)
- 2013–2015: Basel (U-21)
- 2018–2019: Basel (assistant)
- 2019: Luzern
- 2021–2024: Estonia
- 2024–2025: Servette
- * Club domestic league appearances and goals

Thomas Häberli (born 11 April 1974) is a Swiss football manager and former player. He was most recently the head coach of Swiss Super League side Servette FC.

== Club career ==
Häberli was born in Lucerne, Switzerland. He played as midfielder or striker. Häberli started his youth football with the local amateur club FC Eschenbach, based in Eschenbach next to his hometown of Ballwil in Central Switzerland. In 1987 he moved on to FC Hochdorf, where he came through the ranks and advanced to their first team in the fifth tier of the Swiss football pyramid. In 1994, he moved to FC Le Mont, who had just been promoted to the semi-professional third tier, and are based in Le Mont-sur-Lausanne in the French-speaking region of Switzerland. After just four appearances he was quickly snapped up by their bigger local rivals. In January 1995, aged 20, he signed his first profession contract with top-tier FC Lausanne-Sport. However, he played only for their U-21 team because he was suffering with back problems. This was diagnosed as a spinal disc hernia and so he cancelled his contract with the club and retired from professional football.

For the 1996–97 season, he returned to his former club FC Hochdorf in his home Canton of Lucerne. In 1997, he moved to another local side FC Schötz, based in Schötz. In the summer of 1999, aged 25, Häberli had recovered from his health problems and he felt fit enough to resume his career as professional footballer. He contacted local professional club SC Kriens and asked them for a trial session. He impressed them and was offered a contract. His time at playing in the Swiss Challenge League with Kriens was a success and soon top flight clubs were taking note. Just six months later, in January 2000, he signed for FC Basel under head coach Christian Gross. After playing in eight test games Häberli played his domestic league debut for the club, coming in as substitute during the away game in the Stade Olympique de la Pontaise, on 12 March, as Basel played against goalless draw with Lausanne-Sport. Häberli was used by Gross solely as substitute and again after just six months he moved on.

Häberli moved to Bern to play for BSC Young Boys where he remained until the end of his active career. At that time Häberli was the longest serving player at the club. In the 2007–08 season Häberli scored 18 goals and finished second in the goalscoring charts, behind teammate Hakan Yakin, as BSC Young Boys finished second after defeat to winners FC Basel on the final day of the season. He was contracted to the club until 30 June 2010.

== International career ==
In 2004, he made his only appearance so far for Switzerland against the Faroe Islands.

For UEFA Euro 2008 there was speculation amongst the media and the fans that he would be recalled due to his excellent form, and the injury sustained to Blaise Nkufo. He was recalled into the provisional squad by coach Köbi Kuhn and played in a warm up game with the squad in an unofficial friendly against the U21 side of FC Lugano, scoring a goal. However, when the final squad was announced, the next day, Häberli did not make the final cut.

== Coaching career ==
=== Young Boys ===
Häberli was hired as U-18 manager for Young Boys in 2010. After first team manager Vladimir Petkovic was fired, Häberli was appointed as the caretaker manager on 8 May 2011 alongside assistant manager Erminio Piserchia, until the 1 July 2011, where Christian Gross would take over. After the summer, the continued coaching the U-18 squad.

On 30 April 2012, Häberli was promoted to first team assistant manager under manager Martin Rueda. In April 2013 it was announced, that Häberli would take over the U-21 squad of the club.

=== FC Basel ===
On 26 April 2013, it was confirmed that Häberli would take charge of FC Basel's U-21 squad from the 2013–14 season. In October 2015, Häberli changed position and was appointed as the club's new talent manager. He held this position until the beginning of the 2018/19 season, where he was appointed as first team assistant manager. Häberli resigned on 3 January 2019.

=== FC Luzern ===
On 21 February 2019, he was appointed as the manager of FC Luzern. After a bad start in the 2019-2020 season, he was sacked on 16 December 2019.

=== Estonia ===
On 5 January 2021, Häberli was appointed manager of the Estonia national team on a contract due to run until the end of 2022 FIFA World Cup qualification.

On 15 May 2024, the Estonian Football Association announced that Häberli would step down in June 2024, with his assistant manager Jürgen Henn taking over. In his final match, the Estonian national team lost 4–0 to his native Switzerland.

=== Servette ===
On 10 June 2024, he returned to coaching in Swiss club football, taking up the mantle at Servette FC. He led the club to a second place finish in the 2024–25 Swiss Super League, finish ten points behind champions FC Basel.

After a poor start to the 2025–26 season, his contract was terminated on 4 August 2025. Only two league games had been played, both of which had been lost, including a 1–4 home defeat to FC St. Gallen. However, they had also been eliminated from Champions League qualifying by Czech side FC Viktoria Plzeň.

== Personal life ==
Häberli is married to Olivia and has two daughters and one son, Lielle, Eline and Ben and they live in Tallinn, in Estonia.

Away from football he counts playing Jass, swimming and reading as his hobbies.

=== Managerial ===
As of match played 2 August 2025

Team	Nat	From	To	Record				
Team	Nat	From	To	G	W	D	L	Win %
FC Luzern	(Switzerland)	25 February 2019	16 December 2019	42	17	6	19	40.48
Estonia	(Estonia)	January 2021	5 June 2024	39	10	7	22	25.64
Servette F.C.	(Switzerland)	22 July 2024	Present	47	20	13	14	42.55
Total				128	47	26	55	36.72

== Honours ==
=== As Manager ===
Estonia

- Baltic Cup: 2020
