= Sven Christ =

Swiss footballer and manager (born 1973)

Personal information
- Date of birth: 9 December 1973 (age 52)
- Place of birth: Biel/Bienne, Switzerland
- Height: 1.83 m (6 ft 0 in)
- Position: Defender

Senior career*
Years	Team	Apps	(Gls)
1991–1994	FC Grenchen	81	(2)
1994–1997	FC Aarau	87	(3)
1997–1999	Grasshopper	48	(0)
1999	FC Aarau	10	(0)
1999–2001	Lausanne-Sport	47	(0)
2001–2003	Mainz 05	31	(0)
2003–2008	FC Aarau	123	(1)
Total		427	(6)

Managerial career
- 2008–2009: FC Sursee
- 2009–2010: FC Schötz
- 2010–2012: SC Cham
- 2013–2014: FC Baden
- 2014–2015: FC Aarau
- 2015–2017: FC Winterthur
- * Club domestic league appearances and goals

Sven Christ (born 9 December 1973) is a Swiss football manager and former player.

Christ represented Swiss Super League side FC Aarau on three occasions. Christ left FC Aarau at the end of the 2007–08 season after his contract was not renewed by Polish coach Ryszard Komornicki.
