= Matteo Vanetta =

Swiss footballer and coach (born 1978)

Personal information
- Full name: Matteo Vanetta
- Date of birth: 6 August 1978 (age 48)
- Height: 1.84 m (6 ft 0 in)
- Position: Defender

Team information
- Current team: Young Boys

Senior career*
Years	Team	Apps	(Gls)
1995–1997	AC Lugano	36	(0)
1997–1999	FC Sion	46	(3)
1999–2001	Servette FC	27	(0)
2001–2002	Etoile-Carouge FC	31	(1)
2002–2003	Servette FC	1	(0)
2003–2005	FC Aarau	69	(5)
2005–2008	FC Chiasso	53	(4)

International career
	Switzerland U-21	13	(0)

Managerial career
- 2012-2013: Switzerland U18 (assistant)
- 2013-2014: Switzerland U19 (assistant)
- 2014-2015: Switzerland U20 (assistant)
- 2015-2017: Switzerland U18 (assistant)
- 2015-2016: Servette
- 2016-2017: Servette U18
- 2018-2022: Young Boys (assistant)
- 2022: Young Boys (interim)
- * Club domestic league appearances and goals

Matteo Vanetta (born 6 August 1978) is a Swiss football coach and a former player. He was most recently head coach of Swiss Super League side BSC Young Boys.

Vanetta has previously played for AC Lugano, FC Sion, FC Servette and FC Aarau in the Swiss Super League.
