= Alain Gaspoz =

Footballer (born 1970)

Personal information
- Date of birth: 16 May 1970 (age 56)
- Place of birth: Bagnes, Switzerland
- Height: 1.72 m (5 ft 8 in)
- Position: Right-back

Senior career*
Years	Team	Apps	(Gls)
1989–1992	FC Fribourg		
1992–1994	FC St. Gallen		
1994–1995	FC Winterthur		
1995–1998	FC Sion		
1998–2000	AC Lugano		
1999–2000	FC Zürich		
2000–2002	AC Lugano		
2002–2003	Servette FC		
2003–2004	FC Aarau		
2004–2007	FC Sion		
2007–2009	FC Bagnes		

International career
2003–2008	Benin	21	(1)
- * Club domestic league appearances and goals

Alain Gaspoz (born 16 May 1970) is a former professional footballer who played as a right-back. Born in Switzerland, he made 21 appearances for the Benin national team.

== Career ==
Gaspoz was part of the Benin national team at the 2004 African Nations Cup, which finished bottom of its group in the first round of competition, thus failing to secure qualification for the quarter-finals.

== Honours ==
FC Sion

- Swiss Championship: 1996–97
- Swiss Cup: 1995–96, 1996–97, 2005–06
