= Alexandre de Freitas =

Brazilian footballer (born 1976)

Personal information
- Full name: Alexandre Edílson de Freitas
- Date of birth: July 16, 1976 (age 50)
- Place of birth: Brazil
- Height: 1.84 m (6 ft 0 in)
- Position: Centre-back

Team information
- Current team: SC Brühl SG (assistant manager)

Senior career*
| Years | Team | Apps | (Gls) |
| 2000 | FC Kreuzlingen | | |
| 2001–2002 | Darmstadt 98 | 21 | (1) |
| 2002–2003 | FC Baden | 27 | (3) |
| 2003–2004 | FC Aarau | 5 | (1) |
| 2004–2005 | YF Juventus | 30 | (3) |
| 2005–2006 | FC Rapperswil-Jona | 20 | (3) |
| 2006–2007 | FC Chur 97 | 25 | (6) |
| 2007–2008 | FC Gossau | 11 | (0) |
| 2008–2014 | SC Brühl SG | | |

Managerial career
- 2014–: SC Brühl SG (assistant manager)
- 2018: SC Brühl SG (interim)
- * Club domestic league appearances and goals

Alexandre Edílson de Freitas (born 16 July 1976) is a Brazilian former professional footballer who played as a centre-back.

== Playing career ==
Alexandre de Freitas spent his European career at FC Aarau of Swiss Super League, SV Darmstadt 98 of Regionalliga, FC Baden and YF Juventus of Swiss Challenge League, FC Rapperswil-Jona and Chur 97 of 1. Liga.

== Coaching career ==
Alexandre de Freitas retired in the summer 2014 and was hired as an assistant coach for his last club, SC Brühl SG. On 22 October 2018, he was appointed interim head coach following the departure of Uwe Wegmann. He was in charge for three games, losing all of them, before being replaced in the beginning of November 2018 and then continued in his old position as an assistant coach. As of May 2020, he was still working in the same position.
