= Charles Wittl =

Austrian-Ghanaian footballer

Personal information
- Date of birth: 5 October 1971 (age 55)
- Position: Midfielder

Senior career*
Years	Team	Apps	(Gls)
1990–2000	Neuchâtel Xamax		
1994	→ FC St. Gallen		
1999	Rapid Wien		
2000–2001	Shandong Luneng		
2001	Neuchâtel Xamax		
2001–2002	FC Lausanne-Sport		
2002–2003	Neuchâtel Xamax		
2003–2004	FC Aarau		
2004–2005	FC La Chaux-de-Fonds		
2005–2006	FC Biel-Bienne		
2006–2007	FC Serrières		

International career
1995–1996	Ghana	3	(0)
- * Club domestic league appearances and goals

Charles Wittl (born 5 October 1971) is a retired Austrian-Ghanaian football midfielder.
