= Marek Citko =

Polish footballer (born 1974)

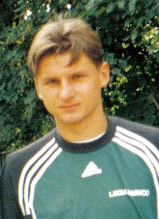

Personal information
- Full name: Marek Citko
- Date of birth: 27 March 1974 (age 52)
- Place of birth: Białystok, Poland
- Height: 1.77 m (5 ft 9 1/2 in)
- Position: Midfielder

Youth career
- 1989–1990: Włókniarz Białystok
- 1990–1992: Jagiellonia Białystok

Senior career*
Years	Team	Apps	(Gls)
1992–1995	Jagiellonia Białystok	74	(12)
1995–1999	Widzew Łódź	86	(24)
1999–2001	Legia Warsaw	36	(6)
2001	Dyskobolia Grodzisk	3	(0)
2001–2002	Hapoel Be'er Sheva	17	(1)
2002	Legia Warsaw	0	(0)
2002–2004	FC Aarau	24	(4)
2004–2005	Cracovia	15	(0)
2005	Yverdon-Sport FC	6	(0)
2005–2007	Polonia Warsaw	36	(7)
Total		297	(54)

International career
1996–1997	Poland	10	(2)
- * Club domestic league appearances and goals

Marek Citko (born 27 March 1974) is a Polish former professional footballer who played as an offensive midfielder. During the professional career Citko represented numerous clubs in Poland and outside the native country, including Włókniarz Białystok, Jagiellonia Białystok, Widzew Łódź, Legia Warsaw, Dyskobolia Grodzisk Wielkopolski, Hapoel Be'er Sheva, FC Aarau, Cracovia and Polonia Warsaw.

== Club career ==
=== Widzew Łódź ===
Citko reached the greatest heights of his career while playing for Widzew Łódź. Led by Franciszek Smuda, Widzew won the 1995–96 and 1996–97 Ekstraklasa titles, as well as the 1996 Polish Super Cup.

During the 1996–97 season, with Citko in the line-up, Widzew qualified for the UEFA Champions League. His team was eliminated from the competition after the group stage. Citko performed well, scoring twice in the first two games of Widzew's campaign. On 11 September, he scored a late goal in a 2–1 away loss against eventual champions Borussia Dortmund. Two weeks later, he chipped José Francisco Molina, the then goalkeeper of the Spain national team, from 40 yards out in a 1–4 home loss against Atlético Madrid.

=== A severe injury & later career ===
Shortly after, on 17 May 1997 in the match against Górnik Zabrze, Citko suffered a serious Achilles tendon injury, and after his 16-month recuperation was unable to capture his previous form. He spent the rest of his career playing for lower profile sides. While representing Polonia Warsaw during the 2006–07 season, on 18 November 2006 Citko scored directly from the corner kick in a 2–2 draw against Zawisza Bydgoszcz. He retired on 29 June 2007, as one of the biggest unfulfilled talents in Polish football history.

== International career ==
During his stint at Widzew, Citko won 10 caps for Poland. On 9 October 1996, in the 1998 World Cup qualifier at Wembley Stadium in London, Citko opened the scoring against the hosts. Despite Poland losing the match 1–2, the game put Citko on foreign clubs' radar. It was reported that the Pole would join Premier League side Blackburn Rovers, but he eventually decided not to leave Poland, explaining that he wished to train as a priest. He was also linked with Liverpool.

=== Stardom in Poland ===
Scoring a goal against England turned Citko into an overnight sensation in Poland. The player came first in a contest organized by the Polish Television (TVP), Polish Radio Program 3 (PR3) and "Super Express" (a Polish daily newspaper). He also won the Polish Newcomer of the Year award given out by "Piłka Nożna", at the time the biggest football magazine in Poland, and came 10th in the contest of "Przegląd Sportowy".

== Career statistics ==
=== International ===
Appearances and goals by national team and year
National team	Year	Apps	Goals
Poland
Poland	1996	5	1
Poland	1997	5	1
Total		10	2

Scores and results list Poland's goal tally first, score column indicates score after each Citko goal.

List of international goals scored by Marek Citko
No.	Date	Venue	Opponent	Score	Result	Competition
1	9 October 1996	Wembley Stadium, London, England	England	1–0	1–2	1998 FIFA World Cup qualification
2	26 February 1997	Estádio Serra Dourada, Goiânia, Brazil	Brazil	2–4	2–4	Friendly

== Honours ==
Widzew Łódź

- Ekstraklasa: 1995–96, 1996–97
- Polish Super Cup: 1996

Individual

- Polish Newcomer of the Year: 1996
- Ekstraklasa Hall of Fame: 2024
