= Aleksandar Mitreski =

Macedonian footballer (born 1980)

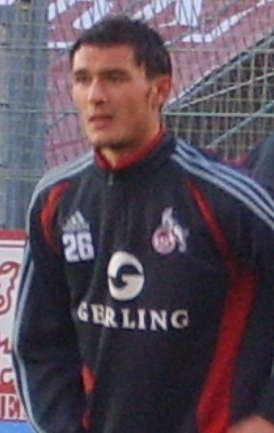
- Mitreski with 1. FC Köln

Personal information
- Full name: Aleksandar Mitreski; Александар Митрески
- Date of birth: 5 August 1980 (age 46)
- Place of birth: Ohrid, SR Macedonia, Yugoslavia
- Height: 1.85 m (6 ft 1 in)
- Position: Centre-back

Youth career
- FC Ohrid
- SC Ittigen

Senior career*
Years	Team	Apps	(Gls)
1999–2002	Young Boys	86	(1)
2002–2006	Grasshoppers	103	(3)
2006–2008	1. FC Köln	55	(0)
2008–2009	1. FC Nürnberg	2	(0)
2009–2010	FC Sion	18	(0)
2011	FC Aarau	14	(0)
Total		278	(4)

International career
2002–2007	Macedonia	33	(0)
- * Club domestic league appearances and goals

Aleksandar Mitreski (Macedonian: Александар Митрески) (born 5 August 1980) is a Macedonian former professional footballer who played as a centre-back.

== Club career ==
Mitreski was born in Ohrid, Yugoslavia. His career began at SC Ittigen. At the age of 12 he moved to the junior team of BSC Young Boys. He eventually became a first team regular and in 2002 he earned a one million Swiss Francs transfer to Grasshopper Club Zürich, where he won the league title in 2003. He then spent a couple of years in Germany playing for 1. FC Köln and 1. FC Nürnberg before returning to Switzerland where he currently plays for FC Sion.

His journey with Sion ended on 2 April 2010 when his contract was terminated by the Sion President for late night visits to a casino. Sion gave Mitreski the chance to tell his side of the story but he lied about how many times he was at the casino so the Sion President decided to terminate his contract after another Sion player was already kicked off the team for being involved in match fixing.

Mitreski agreed to a contract with FC Aarau on 18 December 2010. He signed until the end of the season of the Swiss Challenge League.

== International career ==
He made his senior debut for Macedonia in a March 2002 friendly match against Bosnia and Herzegovina and has earned a total of 33 caps, scoring no goals. His final international was a September 2007 European Championship qualification match against Russia.

== Career statistics ==
=== International ===
Appearances and goals by national team and year
National team	Year	Apps	Goals
Macedonia	2002	7	0
Macedonia	2003	5	0
Macedonia	2004	9	0
Macedonia	2005	6	0
Macedonia	2006	3	0
Macedonia	2007	3	0
Total		33	0
