= Flavio Schmid =

Swiss footballer (born 1980)

Personal information
- Full name: Flavio Schmid
- Date of birth: 6 February 1980 (age 46)
- Place of birth: Switzerland
- Height: 1.79 m (5 ft 10 1/2 in)
- Position: Defender

Team information
- Current team: FC Baden

Senior career*
Years	Team	Apps	(Gls)
2000–2006	FC Aarau	100	(1)
2006–	FC Baden		
- * Club domestic league appearances and goals as of 30 June 2007 ‡ National team caps and goals as of 27 July 2006

Flavio Schmid (born 6 February 1980) is a footballer from Switzerland who currently plays as defender for FC Baden in Switzerland. He has previously played for FC Aarau where he began his career.
