= Richard Núñez =

Uruguayan footballer (born 1976)

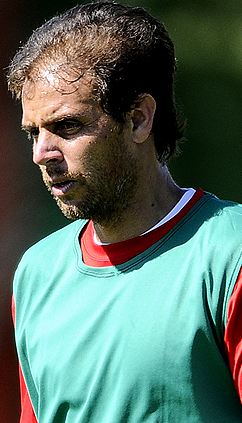
- Richard Nunez

Personal information
- Full name: Richard Darío Núñez Pereyra
- Date of birth: 16 February 1976 (age 50)
- Place of birth: Montevideo, Uruguay
- Height: 1.72 m (5 ft 8 in)
- Positions: Striker; attacking midfielder; left winger

Senior career*
Years	Team	Apps	(Gls)
1996–2000	Danubio	110	(23)
2001–2004	Grasshopper	126	(86)
2005	Atlético Madrid	11	(2)
2005–2007	Cruz Azul	57	(16)
2006	→ C.F. Pachuca (loan)	17	(5)
2008	América	15	(1)
2008–2009	Peñarol	21	(8)
2010–2012	Rampla Juniors	55	(15)
2012–2013	Danubio	24	(2)
2014–2015	Rampla Juniors	34	(11)

International career
2003–2005	Uruguay	9	(0)
- * Club domestic league appearances and goals

Richard Darío Núñez Pereyra (born 16 February 1976 in Montevideo) is a retired Uruguayan footballer.

== Career ==
He started his professional career in Montevideo playing for Danubio, then in 2000 he moved to Europe to the Grasshopper Club Zürich in Switzerland for a club record €4.5 million. There he scored an impressive number of goals and assists.

He moved to Atletico Madrid in Spain in January 2005 as one of the non-EU player and made his debut against Albacete Balompié on 29 January 2005.

=== Mexico ===
He has played in Mexico since 13 August 2005, when he joined Cruz Azul, scoring 4 goals against Tecos UAG in his debut match. He later joined C.F. Pachuca. In May 2006, after a successful campaign with Pachuca, he re-signed with Cruz Azul to a 2-year contract.

On 3 January 2008 he has been transferred to Cruz Azul's Rival Club América for US$1,250,000 in 2-year contract worth $700,000 annually. Núñez already wanted to leave Cruz Azul because his future in Cruz Azul depended on what would happen with the transfer of Cesar Delgado.

He played his last game for América in 2008 Copa Libertadores semi-finals first leg. He did not play the second leg due to illness and started his holiday from 4 to 24 June.

=== Transfer controversy ===
On 6 June 2008 he was put on the transfer list by Club América. Nuñez was to stay at Club América as a punishment but without playing any tournament or filial teams for not accepting to go to Puebla. However, Nuñez unilaterally terminated his contract and left for Peñarol in September 2008, after FIFA granted the player had rights to sign a new club independently to the contract dispute with América. Moreover, América sued Nuez for damages after he went missing (since 25 June) on 13 August and filed a claim with FIFA. In response, Nuez sued the club for August's unpaid salary and to have the contract resolved after the club reportedly forbade him from working out with the team over the phone.. On 5 February 2010, FIFA Dispute Resolution Chamber returned the case to Mexican Football Federation. In July 2010, Núñez reached an agreement with Club América.

== Club Titles ==
Season	Team	Title
2002–2003	(Switzerland) Grasshopper	Swiss Super League
Clausura 2006	(Mexico) Pachuca	Primera División de México
