= Rainer Bieli =

Swiss footballer (born 1979)

Personal information
- Full name: Rainer Bieli
- Date of birth: 22 February 1979 (age 47)
- Place of birth: Kestenholz, Switzerland
- Height: 1.76 m (5 ft 9 1/2 in)
- Position: Forward

Senior career*
Years	Team	Apps	(Gls)
1995–97	Grasshopper-Club Zurich	2	(0)
1997–98	FC Baden	20	(12)
1998–00	Neuchâtel Xamax	36	(22)
2000–01	Grasshopper-Club Zurich	18	(2)
2001–02	FC St Gallen	32	(1)
2002–07	FC Aarau	128	(38)
2007	Neuchâtel Xamax	13	(4)
2007–2009	FC Concordia Basel	33	(17)
2009–2011	FC Winterthur	57	(22)
2011–2014	FC Baden	54	(23)

International career^{‡}
?–2002	Switzerland U-21		
- * Club domestic league appearances and goals as of 7 March 2008 ‡ National team caps and goals as of 28 July 2006

Rainer Bieli (born 22 February 1979) is a former footballer from Switzerland who last played as forward for FC Baden in the Swiss First League.
