= 2002–03 FC Aarau season =

FC Aarau
2002–03 season
- Owner: FC Aarau AG
- Club president: Michael Hunziker
- Head-coach: Alain Geiger
- Stadium: Stadion Brügglifeld, Aarau
- 2002–03 NLA Qualifying phase: 12th of 12
- Promotion/relegation NLA/NLB: 1st of 8
- 2002–03 Swiss Cup: Round 5
- Top goalscorer: League: Patrick de Napoli (13); All: Patrick de Napoli (13)

The 2002–03 season was FC Aarau's 100th season in their existence, since their foundation in 1902. It was their twenty-first season in the top-tier of Swiss football, following their promotion at the end of 1980–81 season. At the end of the previous season the FCA first-team were actually placed on a relegation-slot. However, Lausanne-Sport, Lugano and Sion did not obtain a top-level license for the 2002/03 season, subsequently all three clubs were relegated to the NLB and their NLA places filled by Aarau, Delémont and Luzern.

== Overview ==
=== General information ===
At the end of the previous season, at the AGM in May, Michael Hunziker was elected as new FCA club president. Hunziker is a Swiss attorney-at-law and notary. His first action was to appoint a new head-coach for the FCA first-team and the club signed a contraxt with Alain Geiger. Geiger had previously spent three years as head-coach for Neuchâtel Xamax.

The FCA first team competed in this season's domestic first-tier 2002–03 Nationalliga A with the clear intention of reaching the championship group. To achieve this first aim, they would have to finish the qualifying stage under the top eight teams, which has failed repeatedly in previous seasons. The team also competed in the 2002–03 Swiss Cup and here the aim was to stay in the competition as kong as possible. The FCA team had not qualified for the UEFA European competitions and they did not enter the Intertoto Cup.

FCA played their home games in the Stadion Brügglifeld and the stadium is located on the southern outskirts of Aarau, in the territory of the neighboring municipality of Suhr. The stadium is about one and a half kilometers from Aarau city center and the railway station.

=== Financial situation ===
Since the moment that local businessman and architect Ernst Lämmli stepped down as club president, he was no longer in the duty to fill the club's financial deficits, as he had done during many years before. The club then had a new triumvirate leadership, the co-chairmanship consisted of Peter Kappeler, Christian Stärkle and Daniel Probst. They then stabilised the club during an extremely critical phase — both financially and in terms of its sporting performance — in which the club had to be saved from bankruptcy, partly through the sale of transfer rights. As explained above, the three clubs Lausanne-Sport, Lugano and Sion did not obtain first-tier licenses for the 2002/03 season, subsequently all three clubs were relegated and this was mainly due to financial issues. To avert the looming bankruptcy of FC Aarau, the club’s management at the time, under the leadership of Kappeler, transferred the transfer rights of players to MTO, a consulting firm based in Zug. Peter Kappeler died in July 2002 at the age of 51. But this contract subsequently led to a legal dispute that dragged on for years.

At the end of 2002, FCA was on the verge of financial ruin. In a high-profile initiative, by executing a dramatic 50-day rescue plan that completely restructured the historic Swiss football club, Hunziker succeeded in raising millions in a very short space of time and transformed the club into a public limited company named FC Aarau AG. The club was effectively "on its deathbed". To emphasize the severity of the situation, Hunziker openly hired a specialized firm to prepare formal bankruptcy filings. Seeing that the club was realistically about to crash, he acted as a final wake-up call for the community and local businesses. He initiated an unprecedented public campaign, making thousands of shares available for purchase to local businesses, supporter groups, and private citizens. In just 50 days, the campaign successfully raised 2.88 million Swiss Francs.

The public limited company (Aktiengesellschaft) of FC Aarau was founded on 7 January 2003. It is responsible for the professional football operations of the first team in the Challenge League, as well as for high-performance football within the youth sector.

== Players ==
The following is the list of the FCA first team squad this season. It also includes players that were in the squad the day the domestic league season started, on 15 July 2000, but subsequently left the club after that date.

Note: Flags indicate national team as defined under FIFA eligibility rules; some limited exceptions apply. Players may hold more than one non-FIFA nationality.

No.	Pos.	Nation	Player
1	GK	SUI	Ivan Benito (league games: 9)
18	GK	SUI	Alex Kollbrunner (league games: 0)
23	GK	SUI	Massimo Colomba (league games: 26)
2	DF	SUI	Flavio Schmid (league games: 23)
3	DF	ITA	Davide Moretto (league games: 16)
4	DF	SUI	Marco Walker (league games: 18)
6	DF	SUI	Frédéric Page (league games: 35)
8	DF	SUI	Ivan Previtali (league games: 18)
10	DF	SUI	Gerardo Seoane (league games: 32)
24	DF	SUI	Matteo Vanetta (league games: 13)
25	DF	SUI	Luca Denicolà (league games: 6)
34	DF	AUT	Emanuel Pogatetz (league games: 21)
—	DF	SUI	Cyrill Gloor (league games: 4)
5	MF	POL	Dariusz Skrzypczak (league games: 15)
7	MF	ITA	Roberto Baldassari (league games: 0)
11	MF	SEN	Pape Seydou Diop (league games: 15)
12	MF	SEN	Lamine Diarra (league games: 17)

No.	Pos.	Nation	Player
14	MF	SUI	Manuel Bühler (league games: 9)
15	MF	SUI	Elvir Melunović (league games: 27)
16	MF	SUI	Alain Schultz (league games: 2)
19	MF	SUI	Roman Friedli (league games: 20)
20	MF	SEN	Mamadou Diarra (league games: 3)
20	MF	BDI	David Opango (league games: 8)
21	MF	SUI	Manuel Schenker (league games: 3)
26	MF	POL	Marek Citko (league games: 11)
—	MF	SUI	Sven Lüscher (league games: 1)
—	MF	SUI	Francesco Nucera (league games: 3)
8	FW	GHA	Charles Wittl (league games: 12)
9	FW	NIG	Christian Okpala (league games: 9)
9	FW	UKR	Serhiy Skachenko (league games: 4)
13	FW	SUI	Frédéric Chassot (league games: 31)
17	FW	SUI	Patrick De Napoli (league games: 32)
22	FW	SUI	David Degen (league games: 22)
35	FW	SUI	Rainer Bieli (league games: 20)

Players who left the squad

The following is the list of the FCA first team players that left the squad during the previous season or in the off-season, before the new domestic season began. Note: Flags indicate national team as defined under FIFA eligibility rules; some limited exceptions apply. Players may hold more than one non-FIFA nationality.

No.	Pos.	Nation	Player
—	DF	BRA	Ventura Gelson
—	DF	SUI	Marc Fiechter (to SC Zofingen)
—	DF	SUI	Mario Eggimann (to Karlsruher SC)
—	MF	ITA	Roberto Baldassari (retired)
—	MF	SUI	Daniel Joller
—	MF	SUI	Daniel Tarone (to Zürich)
—	MF	EGY	Mohamed Gouda (returned to Al Ahly)

No.	Pos.	Nation	Player
—	MF	GER	Daniel Wolf
—	MF	SUI	Daniel Gygax (to Zürich)
—	MF	POL	Sławomir Wojciechowski (to RKS Radomsko)
—	FW	BRA	Gil (retutned to Ituano)
—	FW	ESP	Manuel Calvo
—	FW	GEO	Levan Khomeriki (to Wohlen)

== Results ==
Legend

Win Draw Loss Postponed

=== Nationalliga A ===
==== Qualification round ====
The qualification round of the 2002–03 league season was contested by twelve teams. This phase began with one match on 3 July 2002, the others on 6 July, and was completed on 7 December. The eight teams at the top of the table at the end of the qualification stage were then to compete in the championship play-off round. The teams in ninth to twelfth position competed with the top four teams of the NLB in a promotion/relegation group to decide which two teams would play top tier next season, because the top-tier was to be reduced from twelve to ten clubs.

6 July 2002 Round 1	Aarau	0–1	Basel	Stadion Brügglifeld, Aarau
17:30	Chassot (yellow card) 16'	FCB summary FCA summary	19' (0:1) Giménez; (yellow card) 27' Tum; (yellow card) 58' Cantaluppi; (yellow card) 83' Koumantarakis	Attendance: 10,100; Referee: (Switzerland) Massimo Busacca (Monte Carasso/Bellinzona)
Note: FCA without Baldassarri (injured) and Mamadou Diarra (not yet eligible to play). FCA without Atouba, Huggel, Varela (all injured) and Chipperfield (Australian national team).

13 July 2002 Round 2	Wil	4–0	Aarau	Stadion Bergholz, Wil
17:30	Lustrinelli 2' (1:0); Mordeku 38' (2:0); Naldo 63' (3:0); Pavlović 66' (4:0)	FCA summary	(yellow card) 56' Walker	Attendance: 2,450; Referee: (Switzerland) Carlo Bertolini (Vira-Gambarogno)

17 July 2002 Round 3	Aarau	2–3	Grasshopper Club	Stadion Brügglifeld, Aarau
19:30	Seoane (yellow card) 22' de Napoli 34' (1:1); Melunović 62' (2:3)	FCA summary	25' (0:1) Petrić; 57' (1:2) Baturina; 59' (1:3) Petrić; (yellow card) 70' Smiljanić	Attendance: 6,000; Referee: (Switzerland) Reto Rutz (Amriswil)

20 July 2002 Round 4	Aarau	2–0	Xamax	Stadion Brügglifeld, Aarau
17:30	Melunović 59' (1:0); Friedli (yellow card) 66'; Chassot (yellow card) 78' de Napoli 90+1' (2:0)	FCA summary	(yellow card) 80' (yellow-red card) 83' Barea; (yellow card) 85' da Silva	Attendance: 4,000; Referee: (Switzerland) Guido Wildhaber (Kerzers)
Note: 31st minute, Xamax player Simo was carried off injured.

27 July 2002 Round 5	Young Boys	1–0	Aarau	Stadion Neufeld, Bern
19:30	Häberli (yellow card) 79'; Chapuisat 89' (1:0)	FCA summary YB summary	(yellow card) 20' Seydou Diop; (yellow card) 33' de Napoli; (yellow card) 45' (yellow-red card) 45' Chassot	Attendance: 8,600; Referee: (Austria) Schüttengruber
Note: The Young Boys played their home games in the Stadion Neufeld after the Wankdorf Stadium was demolished in 2001 and the new Stadion Wankdorf was constructed on the same site. This match was played as part of the interaction referee exchange between the Swiss Football Association and the Austrian Football Association.

3 August 2002 Round 6	Aarau	1–1	St. Gallen	Stadion Brügglifeld, Aarau
17:30	Degen 72' (1:1)	FCA summary	7' (0:1) Guido	Attendance: 4,700; Referee: (Switzerland) Markus Nobs (Wohlen bei Bern)

11 August 2002 Round 7	Delémont	2–1	Aarau	La Blancherie, Delémont
16:15	Ojong (yellow card) 28'; Shereni 48' (1:1); Ojong 63' (2:1); Selimi (yellow card) 66'; Vernier (yellow card) 89'	FCA summary	10' (0:1) Chassot; (yellow card) 28' Schmid; (yellow card) 33' D. Degen	Attendance: 2,580; Referee: (Switzerland) Claudio Circhetta (Muttenz)

18 August 2002 Round 8	Aarau	3–1	Zürich	Stadion Brügglifeld, Aarau
16:15	Degen (yellow card) 19'; Diarra 53' (1:1); Diarra 59' (2:1); Seoane (yellow card) 68' de Napoli (yellow card) 77'; Skrzypczak (yellow card) 86'; Diarra 90+3'	FCZ summary FCA summary	6' (0:1) Yasar; (yellow card) 36' Hellinga; (yellow card) 83' Schneider	Attendance: 3,300; Referee: (Switzerland) Massimo Busacca (Monte Carasso/Bellinzona)
Note: FCZ without Akalé (suspended)

24 August 2002 Round 9	Servette	5–0	Aarau	Charmilles Stadium, Geneva
19:30	Senderos 24' (1:0); Diogo 67' (2:0); Thurre 76' (3:0); Thurre (yellow card) 79'; Lombardo 87' (4:0); Lombardo 90+3' (5:0)	FCA summary	(yellow card) 8' (yellow-red card) 49' Diarra	Attendance: 3,396; Referee: (Switzerland) René Rogalla (Wallisellen)

31 August 2002 Round 10	Aarau	1–2	Luzern	Stadion Brügglifeld, Aarau
19:30	de Napoli 20' (1:0)	FCA summary	(yellow card) 11' Koch; 39' (1:1) Monteiro; (yellow card) 73' Muff; 90' (1:2) Malacarne	Attendance: 4,300; Referee: (Switzerland) Carlo Bertolini (Vira-Gambarogno)

10 September 2002 Round 11	Thun	2–0	Aarau	Stadion Lachen, Thun
17:30	Renfer 21' (1:0); Cerrone 46' (2:0); Deumi (yellow card) 56'	FCA summary	(yellow card) 43' de Napoli; (yellow card) 73' Okpala	Attendance: 2,750; Referee: (Switzerland) Nicole Petignat (Courgenay)

14 September 2002 Round 12	Basel	4–0	Aarau	St. Jakob-Park, Basel
19:30	Giménez 5' (1:0); Giménez 54' (2:0); Esposito (yellow card) 51'; P. Degen (yellow card) 56'; Barberis 71' (3:0); M. Yakin 90+1' (4:0)	FCB summary FCA summary	(yellow card) 55' D. Degen; (yellow card) 63' Pogatetz; (yellow card) 70' Diop; (yellow card) 90+1' Skrzypczak	Attendance: 25,385; Referee: (Switzerland) Guido Wildhaber (Kerzers)
Note: FCB without Chipperfield, Duruz, Ergic, Huggel, Varela, Philipp Degen and Zwyssig (all injured). FCA without Chassot (was ill), Baldassarri, Mamadou Diarra and Moretto (all injured).

21 September 2002 Round 13	Aarau	0–0	Wil	Stadion Brügglifeld, Aarau
17:30	Pogatetz (yellow card) 50'; Walker (yellow card) 63'	FCA summary	(yellow card) 24' Pavlović; (yellow card) 58' Romano; (yellow card) 78' Montandon	Attendance: 2,900; Referee: (Switzerland) Carlo Bertolini (Vira-Gambarogno)

28 September 2002 Round 14	Grasshopper Club	3–0	Aarau	Hardturm, Zürich
17:30	Petrić 37' (1:0); Núñez 54' (2:0); Smiljanić (yellow card) 57'; Baturina 60' (3:0); Gerber (yellow card) 65'	FCA summary	(yellow card) 24' Previtali; (yellow card) 50' Melunović (yellow card)	Attendance: 3,900; Referee: (Switzerland) Claudio Circhetta (Muttenz)
Note: 8th minute, GC player Castillo substituted out injured.

5 October 2002 Round 15	Xamax	3–1	Aarau	Stade de la Maladière, Neuchâtel
19:30	Bättig (yellow card) 16'; Zambaz 53' (1:1); Rey 62' (2:1); Simo 84' (3:1)	FCA summary	25' (0:1) Seoane; (yellow card) 33' Bieli; (yellow card) 50' Pogatetz; (yellow card) 57' Skrzypczak; (yellow card) 65' Seoane	Attendance: 4,000; Referee: (Switzerland) Reto Rutz (Amriswil)

19 October 2002 Round 16	Aarau	1–1	Young Boys	Stadion Brügglifeld, Aarau
19:30	de Napoli 6' (1:0) de Napoli (yellow card) 65'	FCA summary	81' (1:1) Magnin	Attendance: 4,000; Referee: (Switzerland) Philippe Leuba (Chexbres)

27 October 2002 Round 17	St. Gallen	1–0	Aarau	Espenmoos, St. Gallen
16:15	Gane 65' (pen.)	FCA summary	(yellow card) 27' Bieli; (yellow card) 84' Schenker	Attendance: 9.000; Referee: (Switzerland) Guido Wildhaber (Kerzers)

2 November 2002 Round 18	Aarau	3–0	Delémont	Stadion Brügglifeld, Aarau
17:30	Walker (yellow card) 29'; Bieli (yellow card) 54'; Chassot 55' (1:0); Bieli 61' (2:0); Friedli (yellow card) 62'; Previtali 90+2' (3:0)	FCA summary	(yellow card) 32' (yellow-red card) 49' Karlen; (yellow card) 63' Vernier	Attendance: 2,000; Referee: (Austria) Franz Mostböck
Note: This match was played as part of the interaction referee exchange between the Swiss Football Association and the Austrian Football Association.

16 November 2002 Round 19	Zürich	1–2	Aarau	Letzigrund, Zürich
17:30	Bastida 32' (1:0); Quentin (yellow card) 22' (yellow-red card) 63'	FCZ summary FCA summary	(yellow card) 23' de Napoli; (yellow card) 36' Pogatetz; (yellow card) 55' Previtali; (yellow card) 69' Diarra; 77' (1:1) de Napoli; 87' (1:2) Chassot; (yellow card) 89' Friedli	Attendance: 4,200; Referee: (Switzerland) Claudio Circhetta (Muttenz)

24 November 2002 Round 20	Aarau	0–3	Servette	Stadion Brügglifeld, Aarau
14:30		FCA summary	15' (0:1) Obradović; 23' (0:2) Frei; (yellow card) 53' Cravero; (yellow card) 59' Jaquet; (yellow card) 78' Diogo; 82' (0:3) Frei	Attendance: 3,450; Referee: (Switzerland) Florian Etter

1 December 2002 Round 21	Luzern	2–0	Aarau	Stadion Allmend, Luzern
14:30	Muff 22' (1:0); Muff (yellow card) 57'; Maric (yellow card) 63'; Brand 87' (pen.)	FCA summary	(yellow card) 44' Pogatetz	Attendance: 4,611; Referee: (Liechtenstein) Roland Beck (Triesenberg)

8 December 2002 Round 22	Aarau	2–0	Thun	Stadion Brügglifeld, Aarau
14:30	D. Degen 35' (1:0); Bieli 80' (2:0)	FCA summary	(yellow card) 45' Aziawonou; (yellow card) 85' Balmer; (yellow card) 86' Aegerter	Attendance: 3,500; Referee: (Switzerland) Philippe Leuba (Chexbres)

==== League table ====
Pos	Team	Pld	W	D	L	GF	GA	GD	BP	Pts	Qualification
1	Grasshopper Club	22	15	4	3	58	26	+32	0	49	Advance to championship round halved points (rounded up) as bonus
2	Basel	22	14	5	3	57	25	+32	0	47	Advance to championship round halved points (rounded up) as bonus
3	Thun	22	9	4	9	33	33	0	0	31	Advance to championship round halved points (rounded up) as bonus
4	Wil	22	8	7	7	43	45	−2	0	31	Advance to championship round halved points (rounded up) as bonus
5	Zürich	22	9	4	9	35	37	−2	0	31	Advance to championship round halved points (rounded up) as bonus
6	Xamax	22	8	7	7	30	33	−3	0	31	Advance to championship round halved points (rounded up) as bonus
7	Young Boys	22	8	6	8	41	41	0	0	30	Advance to championship round halved points (rounded up) as bonus
8	Servette	22	8	5	9	45	37	+8	0	29	Advance to championship round halved points (rounded up) as bonus
9	Luzern	22	7	5	10	31	38	−7	−2	24	Continue to promotion/relegation round
10	St. Gallen	22	6	6	10	31	48	−17	0	24	Continue to promotion/relegation round
11	SR Delémont	22	6	2	14	24	44	−20	0	20	Continue to promotion/relegation round
12	Aarau	22	5	3	14	19	40	−21	0	18	Continue to promotion/relegation round

Source: RSSSF
Rules for classification: 1) points; 2) goal difference; 3) number of goals scored.
FC Luzern 2 points deducted for irregularities in license application, therefore total points: 24

==== Promotion/relegation NLA/NLB ====
The teams in ninth to twelfth position in the NLA qualification phase competed with the top four teams of the NLB in a promotion/relegation group to decide which two teams would play top-tier next season. In then next season, the top tier was to be reduced from twelve to ten clubs, the second tier was to be increased to 16 teams. This phase began on 1 March 2003 and was completed on 29 May.

1 March 2003 Round 1	Aarau	3–0	Sion	Stadion Brügglifeld, Aarau
17:30	de Napoli 60' (1:0); Pogatetz 66' (2:0); Chassot 90+4' (3:0)	FCA summary	(yellow card) Sarni; (yellow card) Perdichizzi; (yellow card) Baubonne; (yellow card) Screpis	Attendance: 3,600; Referee: (Switzerland) Reto Rutz (Amriswil)

8 March 2003 Round 2	Luzern	0–1	Aarau	Stadion Allmend, Luzern
19:30	Malacarne (yellow card); Muff (yellow card)	FCA summary	45' (0:1) Vanetta; (yellow card) Page; (yellow card) Moretto; (yellow card) D. Degen; (yellow card) Pogatetz	Attendance: 5,570; Referee: (Switzerland) René Rogalla (Wallisellen)

15 March 2003 Round 3	Aarau	5–1	Vaduz	Stadion Brügglifeld, Aarau
17:30	Bieli 16' (1:0) de Napoli 23' (2:0); Bieli 33' (3:0) de Napoli 66' (4:1) (Ritter) 86' (o.g.); Moretto (yellow card)	FCA summary	49' (3:1) Zarn; (yellow card) Büchel; (yellow card) Pérez	Attendance: 3,500; Referee: (Switzerland) Philippe Leuba (Chexbres)

21 March 2003 Round 4	Lugano	(1–2) ANN	Aarau	Cornaredo, Lugano
19:30	Simon 89' (1:2)	FCA summary	3' (0:1) de Napoli; 17' (0:2) Bieli; (yellow card) Pogatetz	Attendance: 1,623; Referee: (Switzerland) Guido Wildhaber (Kerzers)
Note: The match result was subsequently annulled due to Lugano's later bankruptcy. 31st minute, Lugano player Darbellay carried off injured.

6 April 2003 Round 5	Delémont	1–2	Aarau	La Blancherie, Delémont
14:30	Benson 22' (1:0); Parra (yellow card); Di Zenzo (yellow card); Benson (yellow card)	FCA summary	59' (1:1) Bieli; 79' (1:2) de Napoli; (yellow card) Seoane; (yellow card) Bieli; (yellow card) de Napoli	Attendance: 2,100; Referee: (Switzerland) Florian Etter

12 April 2003 Round 6	Aarau	1–2	Kriens	Stadion Brügglifeld, Aarau
17:30	de Napoli 15' (1:0); Walker (yellow card) de Napoli (yellow card); Diarra (yellow card); Citko (yellow card)	FCA summary	44' (1:1) Neri; 77' (1:2) Burri; (yellow card) Izzo; (yellow card) Burri; (yellow card) Egli	Attendance: 4,500; Referee: (Switzerland) Sascha Kever (Vezia)

21 April 2003 Round 7	St. Gallen	0–0	Aarau	Espenmoos, St. Gallen
16:15	Tachie-Mensah (yellow card)	FCA summary	(yellow card) Pogatetz; (yellow card) Page; (yellow card) D. Degen; (yellow card) Seoane	Attendance: 10,700; Referee: (Switzerland) Massimo Busacca (Monte Carasso/Bellinzona)

26 April 2003 Round 8	Aarau	1–0	St. Gallen	Stadion Brügglifeld, Aarau
17:30	Colomba 28' (1:0); Wittl (yellow card); Walker (yellow card)	FCA summary	(yellow card) Barnetta; (yellow card) Imhof; (yellow card) Tachie-Mensah; (yellow card) Jairo; (yellow card) Müller; (yellow card) Caló	Attendance: 4,500; Referee: (Switzerland) Claudio Circhetta (Muttenz)
Note: 28th minute, FCSG goalkeeper Stefano Razzetti was positioned far too far off his line and could only watch helplessly as Colomba’s 86-meter goal kick bounced in front of him and sailed over his head into the net. This spectacular strike from roughly 86 meters out proved to be the only goal of the match. Thanks to this "goal of the century," FCA won the game 1–0.

4 May 2003 Round 9	Kriens	1–4	Aarau	Stadion Kleinfeld, Kriens
19:30	Ekubo 88' (1:4); Izzo (yellow card); Foletti (yellow card); Gjuraj (yellow card)	FCA summary	11' (0:1) Vanetta; 16' (0:2) Seoane; 37' (pen.) Citko; 80' (0:4) Chassot; (yellow card) Pogatetz; (yellow card) Bieli	Attendance: 2,640; Referee: (Switzerland) Jérôme Laperrière (Kerzers)

8 May 2003 Round 10	Aarau	2–0	Delémont	Stadion Brügglifeld, Aarau
19:30	Bieli 28' (1:0); Pogatetz 80' (2:0); Citko (yellow card)	FCA summary	(yellow card) Hushi; (yellow card) Reimann; (yellow card) Casasnovas; (yellow card) Kébé; (yellow card) Bui	Attendance: 3,200; Referee: (Switzerland) Dieter Schoch (Attiswil)

17 May 2003 Round 11	Aarau	P–P	Lugano	Stadion Brügglifeld, Aarau
17:30		FCA summary
Note: FC Lugano withdrew, were declared bankrupt and relegated to amateur status.

21 May 2003 Round 12	Vaduz	3–6	Aarau	Rheinpark Stadion, Vaduz
19:30	Polverino 37' (1:2); Polverino 50' (2:2); Polverino 76' (3:3); Zarn (yellow card)	FCA summary	15' (0:1) Bieli; 17' (0:2) Citko; 57' (2:3) de Napoli; 81' (3:4) Pogatetz; 86' (3:5) Chassot; 89' (3:6) Bieli; (yellow card) Pogatetz; (yellow card) Vanetta	Attendance: 2,800; Referee: (Switzerland) Reto Rutz (Amriswil)

24 May 2003 Round 13	Aarau	4–2	Luzern	Stadion Brügglifeld, Aarau
15:45	de Napoli 10' (1:0); Citko 55' (2:0); Chassot 75' (3:1); Chassot 81' (4:1); Vanetta (yellow card); Pogatetz (yellow card)	FCA summary	63' (2:1) Kavelashvili; 85' (4:2) Muff; (yellow card) Cenci; (yellow card) Muff; (yellow card) Schwegler	Attendance: 5,200; Referee: (Switzerland) René Rogalla (Wallisellen)

29 May 2003 Round 14	Sion	3–1	Aarau	Stade Tourbillon, Sion
16:15	Isabella 13' (1:0); Screpis 80' (2:1); Luís Carlos 90+2' (3:1); Screpis (yellow card)	FCA summary	67' (1:1) Diarra; (yellow card) Opango	Attendance: 1,800; Referee: (Switzerland) Philippe Leuba (Chexbres)

==== Final group table ====
Pos	Team	Pld	W	D	L	GF	GA	GD	Pts	Qualification
1	Aarau	12	9	1	2	30	13	+17	28	Qualification to Super League
2	St. Gallen	12	7	3	2	25	9	+16	24	Qualification to Super League
3	Luzern	12	4	4	4	24	22	+2	16	Relegated to Challenge League
4	Vaduz	12	3	4	5	17	23	−6	13	Qualification to Challenge League
5	Sion	12	3	3	6	14	18	−4	12	Licence refused. Relegated to 1. Liga
6	Delémont	12	3	3	6	13	24	−11	12	Relegated to Challenge League
7	Kriens	12	3	2	7	14	28	−14	11	Qualification to Challenge League
8	Lugano	0	0	0	0	0	0	0	0	Relegated to 2. Liga

Source: RSSSF
Notes: FC Aarau and FC St. Gallen remained in Super League; no team promoted.
FC Luzern and SR Delémont relegated from Super League to Challenge League.
FC Lugano withdrew, were declared bankrupt and relegated to amateur status.
FC Sion were refused the Licence on the green table and were relegated to amateur status.
Rules for classification: 1) points; 2) goal difference; 3) number of goals scored.

=== Swiss Cup ===
This season's Swiss Cup was the 78th season of Switzerland's cup competition held annually by the Swiss Football Association (SFV-ASF). It began on 9 August with the first games of Round 1 and ended on 11 May 2003 with the Final which was held at St. Jakob-Park, Basel. The cup winners qualified for a place in the first round of the UEFA Cup. The twelve first-tier clubs from the 2002–03 Nationalliga A had been granted byes for the first four rounds and they joined the competition in the fifth round. The first-tier teams were seeded and cound not be drawn against each other. The draw respected regionalities, when possible, and the lower classed team was granted home advantage.

10 November 2002 Round 5	Baden	2–0	Aarau	Esp Stadium, Fislisbach
14:30	Blunschi 27' (1:0); Menezes 76' (2:0)	FCA summary	(yellow card) (yellow-red card) 82' Pogatetz	Attendance: 2,405; Referee: (Switzerland) Martin Salm (Veltheim, Aargau)

At the end of the season, Basel won the cup and this was their seventh cup title to this date and their second consecutive cup title.

=== Friendly matches ===
Before and during the season, FCA also played various Exhibition games, here are a few examples.

16 June 2002 Exhibition game	Aarau	2–2	Zürich	Sportplatz Stampfi, Rothrist
	de Napoli 18' (1:0); Page 88' (2:2)	FCZ summary	52' (pen. 1:1) Hellinga; 69' (1:2) Isibor	Attendance: 500; Referee: (Switzerland) Martin Salm (Veltheim, Aargau)

21 January 2003 Exhibition game	Aarau	3–2	Zürich	Stadion Brügglifeld, Aarau
	Bühler (pen.); Bieli (2:0); Pogatetz (3:0)	FCZ summary	46' (pen.) Iodice (3:2) Tarone

8 February 2003 Winter break	Basel	4–0	Aarau	Leichtathletikstadion St. Jakob, Basel
	Atouba 32' (1:0); Rossi 49' (2:0); Chipperfield 59' (3:0); Rossi 76' (4:0)	FCB Report		Attendance: 1,500; Referee: (Switzerland) Claudio Circhetta (Muttenz)
Note: FCB without M. Yakin (minor knee issues), Ergic and Esposito (both injured). FCA without Skrzypczak (injured). FCA made eight substitutions at half time.

== Sources ==
- Switzerland 2002–03 at RSSSF
- FCA squad 2002–03 at arowa.ch

Preceded by 2001–02	FC Aarau seasons	Succeeded by 2003–04
