= 2001–02 FC Aarau season =

FC Aarau
2001–02 season
- Club Triumvirate Leadership: Christian Stärkle, Daniel Probst and Peter Kappeler
- Head-coach: Rolf Fringer
- Stadium: Stadion Brügglifeld, Aarau
- 2001–02 NLA Qualifying phase: 9th of 12
- Promotion/relegation group NLA/NLB: 5th of 8
- 2001–02 Swiss Cup: Round 6
- Top goalscorer: League: Christian Okpala (10); All: Christian Okpala (11)

The 2001–02 season was FC Aarau's 99th season in their existence, since their foundation in 1902. It was their twentieth season in the top flight of Swiss football, following their promotion at the end of 1980–81 season. FCA played their home games in the Stadion Brügglifeld and the stadium is located on the southern outskirts of Aarau, in the territory of the neighboring municipality of Suhr. The stadium is about one and a half kilometers from Aarau city center and the railway station.

== Overview ==
The local businessman and architect Ernst Lämmli had been the club's president and patron, but at the club's AGM he stepped down. He was appointed by the members as honorary president. The club then had a triumvirate leadership, the co-chairmanship consisted of Peter Kappeler, Christian Stärkle and Daniel Probst. Kappeler was owner of a fiduciary firm in Aarau and served fifteen years as the club's head of finance, as well as being member of the club's executive management. Following his time as co-chairman, he served as the club's president starting in May 2001, but sadly he passed away during the following year. Stärkle was an attorney and auditor based in Aarau, he became involved in the club's leadership during this turbulent period. Probst was local entrepreneur and loyal supporter and member of FCA, he completed the three-person leadership team. Together, they stabilised the club during an extremely critical phase — both financially and in terms of its sporting performance — in which the club had to be saved from bankruptcy, partly through the sale of transfer rights. At the end of this season, at the next AGM in May 2002, all three stood down and Michael Hunziker was elected as new president.

Shortly before the start of the previous season FCA had signed Rolf Fringer as new head-coach. Fringer had previously achieved the championship with the club during the 1992–93 season and had been head-coach of the Swiss national football team during 1996 and 1997. Although the FCA first team had missed the championship group last season, they achieved their minimal aim, which was to remain in the top-tier. Therefore, the club prolonged Fringer's contract and he continued as head-coach into the current season. There was a large number of modifications to the squad, a total of 19 players left the club, either during the previous season or in the off-season.

The FCA first team competed in this season's domestic first-tier 2001–02 Nationalliga A with the clear intention of reaching the championship group and to attempt to qualify for the European competitions. To achieve the first aim, they would have to finish the qualifying stage under the top eight teams, which had failed during the previous seasons. The team also competed in the 2001–02 Swiss Cup. The FCA team had not qualified for the UEFA European competitions and they did not enter the Intertoto Cup.

== Players ==
The following is the list of the FCA first team squad this season. It also includes players that were in the squad the day the domestic league season started, on 15 July 2000, but subsequently left the club after that date.

Note: Flags indicate national team as defined under FIFA eligibility rules; some limited exceptions apply. Players may hold more than one non-FIFA nationality.

No.	Pos.	Nation	Player
1	GK	SUI	Ivan Benito (league games: 30)
18	GK	SUI	Alex Kollbrunner (league games: 8)
2	DF	BRA	Ventura Gelson (league games: 18)
3	DF	SUI	Marc Fiechter (league games: 13)
4	DF	SUI	Mario Eggimann (league games: 35)
6	DF	SUI	Frédéric Page (league games: 33)
8	DF	SUI	Ivan Previtali (league games: 9)
—	DF	ITA	Davide Moretto (league games: 1)
—	DF	SUI	Flavio Schmid (league games: 19)
5	MF	POL	Dariusz Skrzypczak (league games: 33)
7	MF	ITA	Roberto Baldassari (league games: 23)
10	MF	SUI	Elvir Melunović (league games: 31)
13	MF	SUI	Daniel Joller (league games: 16)

No.	Pos.	Nation	Player
14	MF	SUI	Daniel Tarone (league games: 27)
15	MF	EGY	Mohamed Gouda (league games: 10)
19	MF	SUI	Roman Friedli (league games: 29)
21	MF	SUI	Manuel Schenker (league games: 18)
23	MF	GER	Daniel Wolf (league games: 3)
—	MF	SUI	Daniel Gygax (league games: 21)
—	MF	SUI	Sven Lüscher (league games: 1)
—	MF	POL	Sławomir Wojciechowski (league games: 15)
9	FW	NIG	Christian Okpala (league games: 31)
12	FW	BRA	Gil (league games: 22)
16	FW	ESP	Manuel Calvo (league games: 10)
29	FW	SUI	Patrick De Napoli (league games: 34)
—	FW	SUI	David Degen (league games: 2)
—	FW	GEO	Levan Khomeriki (league games: 9)

Players who left the squad

The following is the list of the FCA first team players that left the squad during the previous season or in the off-season, before the new domestic season began.

Note: Flags indicate national team as defined under FIFA eligibility rules; some limited exceptions apply. Players may hold more than one non-FIFA nationality.

No.	Pos.	Nation	Player
—	GK	SUI	Pascal Zuberbühler (end of loan returned to Basel)
—	DF	SUI	David Bader (to FC Wangen bei Olten)
—	DF	CRO	Mirko Pavličević (retired)
—	DF	ITA	Luca Iodice (to Baden)
—	DF	SUI	Salvatore Romano (retired)
—	DF	SUI	Marc Strasser
—	MF	FRA	Olivier Baudry (to RAEC Mons)
—	MF	SUI	André Wiederkehr (to Luzern)
—	MF	BIH	Amir Hamzić (to Anzhi)
—	MF	SUI	Massimo Vivolo

No.	Pos.	Nation	Player
—	MF	SUI	Carmine Pascariello
—	MF	BRA	Cassiano (to Toros Neza)
—	MF	SUI	Remo Senn (to Baden)
—	FW	SUI	Daniel Greco (to Luzern)
—	FW	SUI	Didi (to Juventude)
—	FW	ITA	Gerardo Donatiello
—	FW	SUI	Remo Tovagliaro
—	FW	BUL	Roumen Ivanov (to Baden)
—	FW	SUI	Jean-Pierre La Placa (to R.A.E.C. Mons)

== Results ==
Legend

Win Draw Loss Postponed

=== Nationalliga A ===
==== Qualification round ====
The Qualification Round to the League season 2001–02 was contested by twelve teams. The first eight teams of the regular season (or Qualification phase) were then to compete in the Championship Playoff Round. The teams in ninth to twelfth position completed with the top four teams of the Nationalliga B in a Nationalliga A/B Playoff round. The first stage of the NLA began on Wednesday 4 July 2001 with the first two games and om Saturday 7 July with the rest. The first stage was completed on Sunday 9 December.

7 July 2001 Round 1	Grasshopper Club	1–0	Aarau	Hardturm, Zürich
17:30	Diop 3' (1:0); Haas (yellow card) 63'	FCA summary	(yellow card) 37' de Napoli; (yellow card) 44' Skrzypczak; (yellow card) 44' Fiechter; (yellow card) 59' Schenker	Attendance: 6.300; Referee: (Switzerland) Guido Wildhaber (Kerzers)

14 July 2001 Round 2	Aarau	3–2	Luzern	Stadion Brügglifeld, Aarau
17:30	Gil 20' (pen.); Tarone 24' (2:1); Skrzypczak (yellow card) 38'; Page (yellow card) 45'; Tarone 51' (3:1); Eggimann (yellow card) 54'; Melunović (yellow card) 63'; Tarone (yellow card) 84'	FCA summary	17' (0:1) Koch; (yellow card) 23' Belajić; (yellow card) 28' Ohrel; 53' (3:2) Wiederkehr (yellow card)	Attendance: 4,600; Referee: (Switzerland) Massimo Busacca (Monte Carasso/Bellinzona)
Note: 34th minute, Alexandre Rey was substituted out injured.

17 July 2001 Round 3	Sion	0–1	Aarau	Stade Tourbillon, Sion
19:30	Duruz (yellow card) (yellow-red card) 84'; Grichting (yellow card); Poueys (yellow card); Moreira (yellow card); Bridy (yellow card)	FCA summary	64' (0:1) Tarone; (red card) 84' Gil; (yellow card) Schmid; (yellow card) de Napoli; (yellow card) Friedli	Attendance: 6,550; Referee: (Switzerland) Andreas Schluchter (Schönenbuch)

21July 2001 Round 4	Aarau	1–1	Servette	Stadion Brügglifeld, Aarau
17:30	Schenker 67' (1:0)	FCA summary	87' (1:1) Oruma; (yellow card) 89' Fournier	Attendance: 5,400; Referee: (Switzerland) Markus Nobs (Wohlen bei Bern)
Note: FCA withou Gil (suspended).

28 July 2001 Round 5	St. Gallen	1–1	Aarau	Espenmoos, St. Gallen
17:30	Oberli (yellow card) 39'; Colacino 62' (1:0); Zanni (yellow card) 90+4'	FCA summary	(yellow card) 37' Friedli; (yellow card) 37' Skrzypczak; (yellow card) 45' (yellow-red card) 45' Tarone; 76' (1:1) Schenker; (yellow card) 87' de Napoli; (yellow card) 90+3' Melunović	Attendance: 9,500; Referee: (Switzerland) Dieter Schoch (Attiswil)
Note: 18th minute, Gygax substituted out injured.

4 August 2001 Round 6	Aarau	2–3	Zürich	Stadion Brügglifeld, Aarau
17:30	Okpala (yellow card) 84'; Okpala 87' (1:3); Okpala 89' (2:3)	FCZ summary FCA summary	31' (0:1) Kavelashvili; (yellow card) 33' Hellinga; (yellow card) 44' Jamarauli; 46' (0:2) Jamarauli; 48' (0:3) Chassot; (yellow card) 62' Quentin	Attendance: 6,200; Referee: (Switzerland) Philippe Leuba (Chexbres)
Note: FCA without Tarone (suspended).

11 August 2001 Round 7	Lausanne-Sport	0–3	Aarau	Olympique de la Pontaise, Lausanne
19:30	Chavériat (red card) 64'; Lombardo (yellow card); Zambaz (yellow card); Lutsenko (yellow card); Gobet (yellow card); Puce (yellow card)	FCA summary	7' (0:1) Page; 31' (0:2) Gil; 39' (0:3) Gygax; (yellow card) Melunović; (yellow card) Ventura; (yellow card) Friedli	Attendance: 1,450; Referee: (Switzerland) René Rogalla (Wallisellen)
Note: FCA without Tarone (suspended).

18 August 2001 Round 8	Aarau	1–1	Basel	Stadion Brügglifeld, Aarau
17:15	Joller (yellow card) 15'; Okpala 55' (1:0)	FCB summary FCA summary	(yellow card) 11' Cravero; 69' (1:1) Kreuzer; (yellow card) 76' Chipperfield	Attendance: 7,000; Referee: (Switzerland) Massimo Busacca (Monte Carasso/Bellinzona)
Note: FCB without Ceccaroni, Savic, Cantaluppi, and Ergic (all injured). FCA without Fiechter, Baldassarri, Previtali, De Napoli, Wojciechowski, and Page (all injured), as well as Tarone (suspended) and Khomeriki (absent).

25 August 2001 Round 9	Xamax	0–0	Aarau	Stade de la Maladière, Neuchâtel
19:30	Baubonne (yellow card) 31'; Diop (yellow card) 33'; Atouba (yellow card) 67'	FCA summary	(yellow card) 46' Ventura; (yellow card) 68' Wojciechowski; (yellow card) 75' Okpala	Attendance: 6,400; Referee: (Switzerland) Jean-Luc Schmid

8 September 2001 Round 10	Young Boys	2–1	Aarau	Wankdorf Stadium, Bern
16:30	Tikva 29' (1:0); Sermeter 81' (2:0)	FCA summary	(yellow card) 53' Tarone; (yellow card) 73' Eggimann; (yellow card) 83' Wojciechowski; 90' (2:1) Okpala	Attendance: 7,000; Referee: (Switzerland) Reto Rutz (Amriswil)

15 September 2001 Round 11	Aarau	3–1	Lugano	Stadion Brügglifeld, Aarau
17:30	Gil (yellow card) 12'; Okpala 14' (1:0); Skrzypczak (yellow card) 22'; Okpala 22' (2:0); Ventura (yellow card) 62'; Eggimann (yellow card) 86'; Gygax 90+4' (3:1)	FCA summary	23' (2:1) Rossi; (yellow card) 29' Rota; (yellow card) 34' Rothenbühler; (yellow card) 36' Bastida; (yellow card) 39' (yellow-red card) 67' Biaggi; (yellow card) 44' Magnin; (yellow card) 59' Morf; (red card) 67' Magnin; (yellow card) 84' Muff; (yellow card) 88' Gaspoz	Attendance: 3,500; Referee: (Switzerland) Andreas Schluchter (Schönenbuch)
Note: Referee Andreas Schluchter issued an extraordinary number of cards to keep control over a fiercely competitive game. 13 yellow cards and 2 red cards (one straight red, one double-yellow). The majority of the cards (11 out of 13) were handed out directly for physical fouls as both teams disrupted each other's plays aggressively. Joël Magnin was sent off with a straight red card for a serious foul. Olivier Biaggi was sent off after receiving a second yellow card for another foul.

23 September 2001 Round 12	Aarau	1–0	Grasshopper Club	Stadion Brügglifeld, Aarau
16:15	Okpala (yellow card) 52' de Napoli (yellow card) 88'; Wojciechowski 90+2' (1:0)	FCA summary	(yellow card) 39' Diop; (yellow card) 54' Spycher; (yellow card) 76' Tararache; (yellow card) 90+1' Núñez	Attendance: 6,200; Referee: (Austria) Gerald Lehner
Note: This match was played as part of the interaction referee exchange between the Swiss Football Association and the Austrian Football Association.

2001 Round 13	Luzern	P–P	Aarau	Stadion Allmend, Luzern
		FCA summary

10 October 2001 Round 14	Aarau	2–2	Sion	Stadion Brügglifeld, Aarau
19:30	Okpala 44' (1:1); Gil 64' (2:2); Friedli (yellow card); Gil (yellow card); Melunović (yellow card)	FCA summary	5' (0:1) Vernaz; 45' (1:2) Deumi; (yellow card) Ekobo; (yellow card) Vernaz; (yellow card) Poueys	Attendance: 4,400; Referee: (Switzerland) Florian Etter

13 October 2001 Round 15	Servette	3–3	Aarau	Charmilles Stadium, Geneva
19:30	Frei 18' (pen.); Wolf 39' (2:2); Lonfat 57' (3:2); Oruma (yellow card) 87'; Frei (yellow card) 88'	FCA summary	13' (0:1) Gygax; (yellow card) 17' de Napoli; 25' (1:2) de Napoli; (yellow card) 45' Skrzypczak; (yellow card) 68' Joller; 87' (3:3) Eggimann; (yellow card) 90' Wojciechowski	Attendance: 4,254; Referee: (Liechtenstein) Roland Beck (Triesenberg)
Note: 46th minute, Benito substituted out injured.

16 October 2001 Round 13	Luzern	2–1	Aarau	Stadion Allmend, Luzern
19:30	Monteiro 36' (1:0); Monteiro (yellow card) 70'; Zukic (yellow card) 80'; Alcorsé 88' (2:1)	FCA summary	51' (1:1) Melunović; (yellow card) 79' Page	Attendance: 3,834; Referee: (Switzerland) Carlo Bertolini (Vira-Gambarogno)

21 October 2001 Round 16	Aarau	0–1	St. Gallen	Stadion Brügglifeld, Aarau
16:15		FCA summary	58' (o.g.) (Eggimann); (yellow card) Mokoena; (yellow card) Guido	Attendance: 5,700; Referee: (Switzerland) René Rogalla (Wallisellen)

28 October 2001 Round 17	Zürich	1–0	Aarau	Letzigrund, Zürich
16:15	Magro 29' (1:0)	FCZ summary FCA summary	(yellow card) 86' de Napoli	Attendance: 8,600; Referee: (Switzerland) Dieter Schoch (Attiswil)

3 November 2001 Round 18	Aarau	2–0	Lausanne-Sport	Stadion Brügglifeld, Aarau
17:30	Tarone 30' (1:0); Gil (yellow card) 60'; Tarone 63' (2:0)	FCA summary	(yellow card) 13' Lutsenko	Attendance: 3,100; Referee: (Switzerland) Markus Nobs (Wohlen bei Bern)

17 November 2001 Round 19	Basel	1–0	Aarau	St. Jakob-Park, Basel
16:45	Cravero (yellow card) 14'; Koumantarakis 51' (1:0); Varela (yellow card) 59'	FCB summary FCA summary	(yellow card) 35' de Napoli	Attendance: 22,573; Referee: (Switzerland) Reto Rutz (Amriswil)
Note: FCB without Chipperfield (suspended), Cantaluppi, Ceccaroni, Huggel, and Savic (all injured). Hakan Yakin eligible to play due to the postponement of the National League appeal hearing. FCA without Previtali, Wojciechowski, and Schenker (all injured). 7th minute: a shot from de Napoli hit the crossbar.

24 November 2001 Round 20	Aarau	1–2	Xamax	Stadion Brügglifeld, Aarau
17:30	Okpala 60' (1:1); Okpala (yellow card) 63'	FCA summary	51' (0:1) Mangane; (yellow card) 63' Simo; 89' (1:2) Tachie-Mensah; (yellow card) 83' Mangane	Attendance: 2,900; Referee: (Switzerland) Massimo Busacca (Monte Carasso/Bellinzona)

1 December 2001 Round 21	Aarau	2–0	Young Boys	Stadion Brügglifeld, Aarau
16:45	Skrzypczak (yellow card) 11'; Eggimann (yellow card) 36'; Tarone 42' (1:0); Gil 87' (2:0)	FCA summary	(yellow card) 54' Vardanyan	Attendance: 6,186; Referee: (Switzerland) Philippe Leuba (Chexbres)

9 December 2001 Round 22	Lugano	1–0	Aarau	Cornaredo, Lugano
14:30	Bastida 48' (1:0); Gaspoz (yellow card); Zagorčić (yellow card)	FCA summary	(red card) 46' Skrzypczak; (yellow card) Gygax	Attendance: 4,600; Referee: (Switzerland) René Rogalla (Wallisellen)

==== League table qualification ====
Pos	Team	Pld	W	D	L	GF	GA	GD	Pts	Qualification
1	Basel	22	13	4	5	52	37	+15	43	Advance to championship round halved points (rounded up) as bonus
2	Lugano	22	11	5	6	39	33	+6	38	Advance to championship round halved points (rounded up) as bonus
3	Grasshopper Club	22	11	4	7	50	33	+17	37	Advance to championship round halved points (rounded up) as bonus
4	St. Gallen	22	9	8	5	38	32	+6	35	Advance to championship round halved points (rounded up) as bonus
5	Servette	22	9	7	6	36	29	+7	34	Advance to championship round halved points (rounded up) as bonus
6	Sion	22	10	3	9	40	29	+11	33	Advance to championship round halved points (rounded up) as bonus
7	Young Boys	22	8	7	7	35	28	+7	31	Advance to championship round halved points (rounded up) as bonus
8	Zürich	22	7	9	6	24	27	−3	30	Advance to championship round halved points (rounded up) as bonus
9	Aarau	22	7	6	9	28	25	+3	27	Continue to promotion/relegation round
10	Xamax	22	6	7	9	28	36	−8	25	Continue to promotion/relegation round
11	Lausanne-Sport	22	4	4	14	24	49	−25	16	Continue to promotion/relegation round
12	Luzern	22	3	4	15	23	59	−36	13	Continue to promotion/relegation round

Source: RSSSF

==== Promotion/relegation round ====
The teams in ninth to twelfth position in the NLA qualification round competed with the top four teams of the NLB in a promotion/relegation group to decide which four teams would play top-tier next season. This stage round began on 24 February 2002 and was completed on 8 May.

24 February 2002 Round 1	Xamax	3–1	Aarau	Stade de la Maladière, Neuchâtel
14:30	Tachie-Mensah 27' (1:0); Tachie-Mensah 36' (2:0); Simo 65' (3:0); Oppliger (yellow card)	FCA summary	72' (3:1) Previtali; (yellow card) Page	Attendance: 4,200; Referee: (Liechtenstein) Roland Beck (Triesenberg)

2 March 2002 Round 2	Aarau	2–0	Delémont	Stadion Brügglifeld, Aarau
17:30	Page 2' (1:0) de Napoli 86' (2:0)	FCA summary		Attendance: 1,800; Referee: (Switzerland) Nicole Petignat (Courgenay)
Note: Fair game, no cautions given.

6 March 2002 Round 3	Winterthur	2–2	Aarau	Schützenwiese, Winterthur
18:30	Ramsauer 33' (1:1); Cerrone 35' (2:1); Cerrone (yellow card); Ramsauer (yellow card)	FCA summary	7' (0:1) Page; 72' (2:2) Eggimann; (yellow card) Skrzypczak; (yellow card) Fiechter; (yellow card) Gouda	Attendance: 750; Referee: (Switzerland) Dieter Schoch (Attiswil)
Note: 44th minute, Nemtsoudis substituted out injured.

9 March 2002 Round 4	Aarau	2–1	Luzern	Stadion Brügglifeld, Aarau
17:30	Gil 37' (pen.); Page 86' (2:1); Skrzypczak (yellow card)	FCA summary	44' (1:1) Piu; (yellow card) Maric; (yellow card) Schwegler; (yellow card) Arrué	Attendance: 2,800; Referee: (Switzerland) Claudio Circhetta (Muttenz)

17 March 2002 Round 5	Wil	2–2	Aarau	Stadion Bergholz, Wil
14:30	Pavlović 8' (1:0); Gambino 66' (pen. 2:2); Lustrinelli (yellow card); Mangiarratti (yellow card); Fabinho (yellow card)	FCA summary	20' (1:1) Gil; 36' (1:2) Okpala; (yellow card) Schmid; (yellow card) Friedli; (yellow card) Previtali	Attendance: 1,836; Referee: (Switzerland) Guido Wildhaber (Kerzers)

23 March 2002 Round 6	Aarau	1–3	Thun	Stadion Brügglifeld, Aarau
17:30	Fiechter 71' (1:3); Tarone (yellow card); Gouda (yellow card)	FCA summary	11' (0:1) Parnela; 30' (0:2) Rama; 69' (0:3) Moser; (yellow card) Küffer; (yellow card) Matić; (yellow card) Ferreira	Attendance: 2.600; Referee: (Switzerland) Florian Etter

1 April 2002 Round 7	Aarau	0–3	Lausanne-Sport	Stadion Brügglifeld, Aarau
16:15	Benito (red card) 35'; Schenker (yellow card)	FCA summary	15' (0:1) Fonseca; 72' (0:2) Fonseca; 86' (0:3) Zambaz; (yellow card) Simon; (yellow card) Karlen	Attendance: 3,400; Referee: (Switzerland) Jean-Luc Schmid

6 April 2002 Round 8	Lausanne-Sport	0–1	Aarau	Olympique de la Pontaise, Lausanne
19:30	Chavériat (red card) 74'; Karlen (yellow card)	FCA summary	39' (0:1) Tarone; (yellow card) Eggimann; (yellow card) Fiechter	Attendance: 2,950; Referee: (Switzerland) Markus Nobs (Wohlen bei Bern)
Note: FCA without Benito (suspended).

14 April 2002 Round 9	Thun	0–1	Aarau	Stadion Lachen, Thun
14:30	Aegerter (yellow card)	FCA summary	42' (0:1) de Napoli	Attendance: 1,360; Referee: (Switzerland) René Rogalla (Wallisellen)
Note: FCA without Benito (suspended).

20 April 2002 Round 10	Aarau	0–1	Wil	Stadion Brügglifeld, Aarau
17:30		FCA summary	53' (0:1) Bamba; (yellow card) Mangiarratti; (yellow card) Rizzo; (yellow card) Owusu; (yellow card) Mordeku	Attendance: 3,100; Referee: (Switzerland) Carlo Bertolini (Vira-Gambarogno)

29 April 2002 Round 11	Luzern	2–2	Aarau	Stadion Allmend, Luzern
19:30	Gian 29' (1:0); Piu 51' (2:0); Gian (yellow card)	FCA summary	72' (2:1) Khomeriki; 90+2' (2:2) Benito; (yellow card) Schmid	Attendance: 2,962; Referee: (Switzerland) Dieter Schoch (Attiswil)

28 April 2002 Round 12	Aarau	3–0	Winterthur	Stadion Brügglifeld, Aarau
16:15	Khomeriki 58' (1:0); Tarone 80' (2:0); Okpala 90+2' (3:0); Gouda (yellow card)	FCA summary	(yellow card) (yellow-red card) 90+4' Obhafuoso; (yellow card) Raimondi; (yellow card) Montandon	Attendance: 3,000; Referee: (Switzerland) Massimo Busacca (Monte Carasso/Bellinzona)

4 May 2002 Round 13	Delémont	2–1	Aarau	La Blancherie, Delémont
18:00	Casasnovas 33' (1:0); Heiniger 87' (pen. 2:1); Vernier (yellow card); Reimann (yellow card); Heiniger (yellow card)	FCA summary	55' (1:1) de Napoli; (yellow card) Melunović; (yellow card) Benito	Attendance: 1,350; Referee: (Switzerland) Reto Rutz (Amriswil)

7 May 2002 Round 14	Aarau	2–1	Xamax	Stadion Brügglifeld, Aarau
19:30	Gil 22' (pen.); Ventura 80' (2:0); Okpala (yellow card)	FCA summary	86' Chassot	Attendance: 4,400; Referee: (Liechtenstein) Roland Beck (Triesenberg)

==== Final table ====
Pos	Team	Pld	W	D	L	GF	GA	GD	Pts	Qualification
1	Xamax	14	8	4	2	26	12	+14	28	Remain in NLA
2	Lausanne-Sport (Note: Lausanne did not obtain a top-level license for the 2002/03 season, these three clubs were relegated to the NLB and their NLA places filled by Aarau, Delémont and Luzern.)	14	8	2	4	21	14	+7	26	Did not obtain licence for top-level
3	Wil	14	6	5	3	17	13	+4	23	Promoted to NLA
4	Thun	14	6	3	5	19	18	+1	21	Promoted to NLA
5	Aarau	14	6	3	5	20	20	0	21	Relegated, but remained in NLA via green table
6	Delémont	14	4	4	6	14	20	−6	16	Promoted on green table
7	Luzern	14	2	5	7	26	28	−2	11	Relegated, but remained in NLA via green table
8	Winterthur	14	1	4	9	11	29	−18	7	Remain in NLB

Source: RSSSF
Rules for classification: 1) points; 2) goal difference; 3) number of goals scored.
Notes:

Lausanne-Sport did not obtain a top-level license for the 2002/03 season, neither did Lugano and Sion (who had played in the championship group). These three clubs were relegated on the green table to the NLB and their NLA places were filled by Aarau, Delémont and Luzern.

=== Swiss Cup ===
This season's Swiss Cup was the 77th season of Switzerland's cup competition held annually by the Swiss Football Association (SFV-ASF). The competition began on 10 August with the first games of Round 1 and ended on 12 May 2002 with the Final held at St. Jakob-Park, Basel. The cup winners were qualified for the first round of the UEFA Cup. The twelve first-tier clubs from the 2001–02 Nationalliga A had been granted byes for the first four rounds and they joined the competition in the fifth round. Here they were seeded and cound not be drawn against each other. The draw respected regionalities, when possible, and the lower classed team was granted home advantage.

21 November 2001 Round 5	FC Ascona	0–2	Aarau	Stadio Comunale Ascona
20:00		FCA summary	21' (0:1) Gygax; 90' (0:2) Okpala	Attendance: 600; Referee: (Switzerland) Nicole Petignat (Courgenay)
Note: FC Ascona played the 2001/02 season in the 2. Liga interregional (fourth-tier).

17 February 2002 Round 6	Luzern	1–0 (a.e.t.)	Aarau	Stadion Allmend, Luzern
	Varela 120' (1:0)	FCA summary		Attendance: 4,001; Referee: (Switzerland) Massimo Busacca (Monte Carasso/Bellinzona)

Basel won the cup and this was their sixth cup title to this date. Five days earlier the team had also become league champions and this was the second time in the club's history that they had secured the double. Since Basel won the championship and qualified for the 2002–03 UEFA Champions League, Grasshoppers qualified for the first round of the UEFA Cup.

=== Friendly matches ===
Before and during the season, FCA also played various Exhibition games, here are a few examples.

9 February 2002 Exhibition game	Zürich	1–2	Aarau	Trainings pitch Letzigrund, Zürich
	Guerrero (1:1)	FCZ summary	(0:1) Gil (1:2) Okpala	Attendance: 200; Referee: (Liechtenstein) Roland Beck (Triesenberg)

19 February 2002 Winter break	Basel (Switzerland)	3–0	(Switzerland) Aarau	Rankhof Stadium, Basel
14:30	Tum 9' (2:0); H. Yakin 12' (2:0); Tum 51' (3:0)	FCB summary		Attendance: 300; Referee: (Switzerland) Claudio Circhetta (Muttenz)
Note: FCB without Murat Yakin (knee problems), Zwyssig (was ill on the day), Savic (infected by an ingrown toenail), Cravero (who resumed team training on the following Thursday), and Ceccaroni (still recovering from an injury). FCA without Gelson, Baldassari, Okpala, Joller, Tarone, and Friedli (all injured). 77th minute: a header from Atouba hit the crossbar. 80th minute: a shot from De Napoli hit the post.

== Sources ==
- Switzerland 2001–02 at RSSSF
- FCA squad 2001–02 at arowa.ch

Preceded by 2000–01	FC Aarau seasons	Succeeded by 2002–03
