= Ekubo =

Ekubo is a Nigerian surname. Notable people with the surname include:

- Alexx Ekubo (1986–2026), Nigerian actor, model, entertainer, and humanitarian
- Henry Ekubo (born 1982), Nigerian former footballer
