= Erlen railway station =

Railway station in Switzerland

Erlen
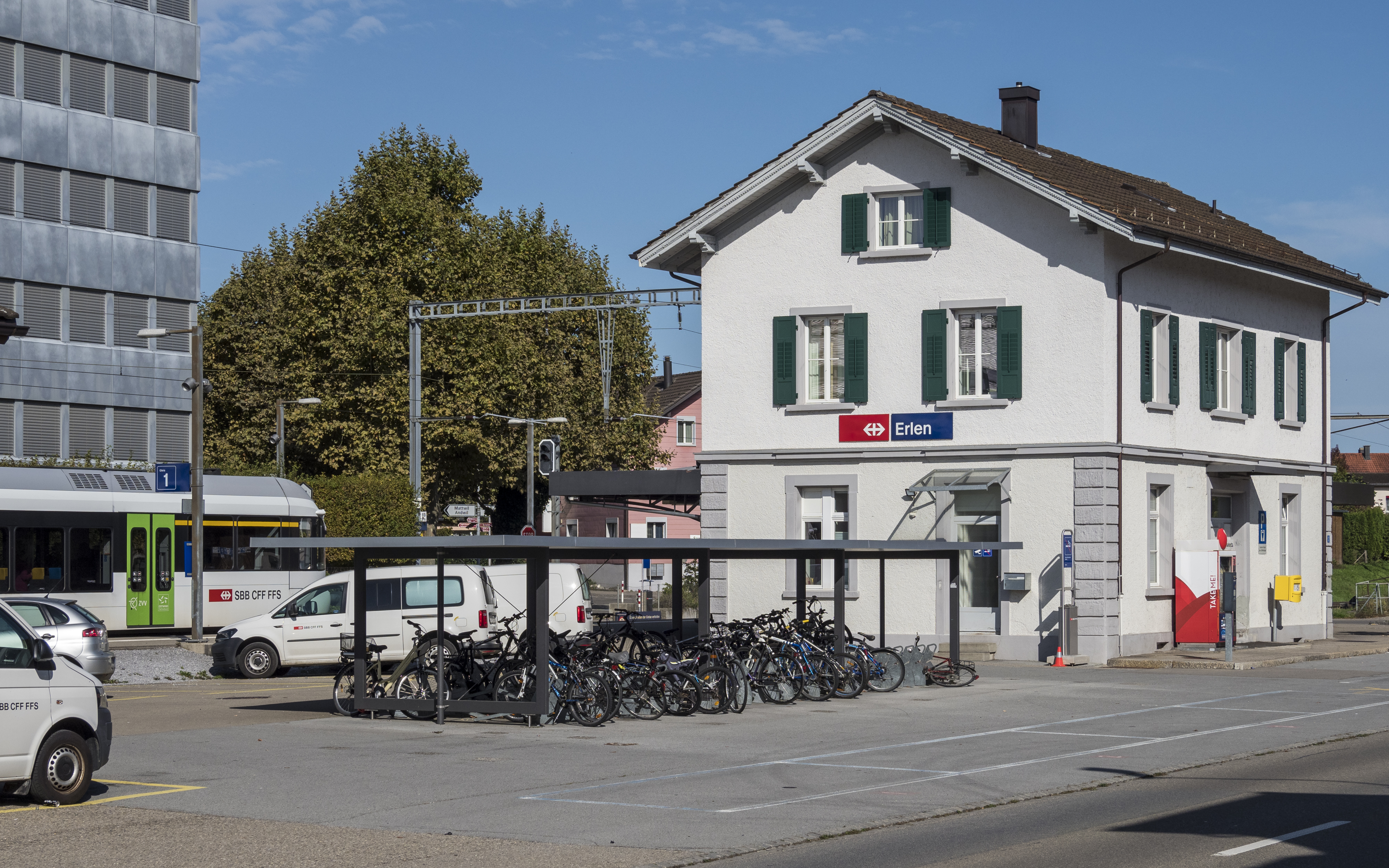
- The station building in 2019

General information
- Location: Erlen; Switzerland
- Coordinates: 47°33′21″N 9°13′25″E
- Elevation: 449 m (1,473 ft)
- Owner: Swiss Federal Railways
- Line: Winterthur–Romanshorn line
- Train operators: Thurbo

Other information
- Fare zone: 226 / 925 (Tarifverbund Ostwind)

Services
Preceding station	St. Gallen S-Bahn	Following station
Sulgen towards Wil	S10	Oberaach towards Romanshorn
Sulgen towards Winterthur	SN30 Limited service	Oberaach towards Romanshorn
Location
- Location within Switzerland Location within Canton of Thurgau

Erlen railway station (German: Bahnhof Erlen) is a railway station in the municipality of Erlen, in the Swiss canton of Thurgau. It is an intermediate stop on the Winterthur–Romanshorn line and is served by local trains only.

== Services ==
Erlen is served by the S10 of the St. Gallen S-Bahn:

- S10: half-hourly service to Wil and to Romanshorn, via Weinfelden.

During weekends, the station is served by a nighttime S-Bahn service (SN30), offered by Ostwind fare network, and operated by Thurbo for St. Gallen S-Bahn.

- St. Gallen S-Bahn SN30: hourly service to Winterthur and to Romanshorn, via Frauenfeld.

== See also ==
- Bodensee S-Bahn
- Rail transport in Switzerland
