= Elwyn Friedrich =

Swiss ice hockey player

- Born: 25 July 1933 Amriswil, Thurgau, Switzerland
- Died: 2 February 2012 (aged 78)
- Playing career: 1961–1972

Elwyn Friedrich (25 July 1933 – 2 February 2012) was a Swiss ice hockey player. He competed at the 1964 Winter Olympics.
