= Oberaach railway station =

Railway station in Switzerland

Oberaach
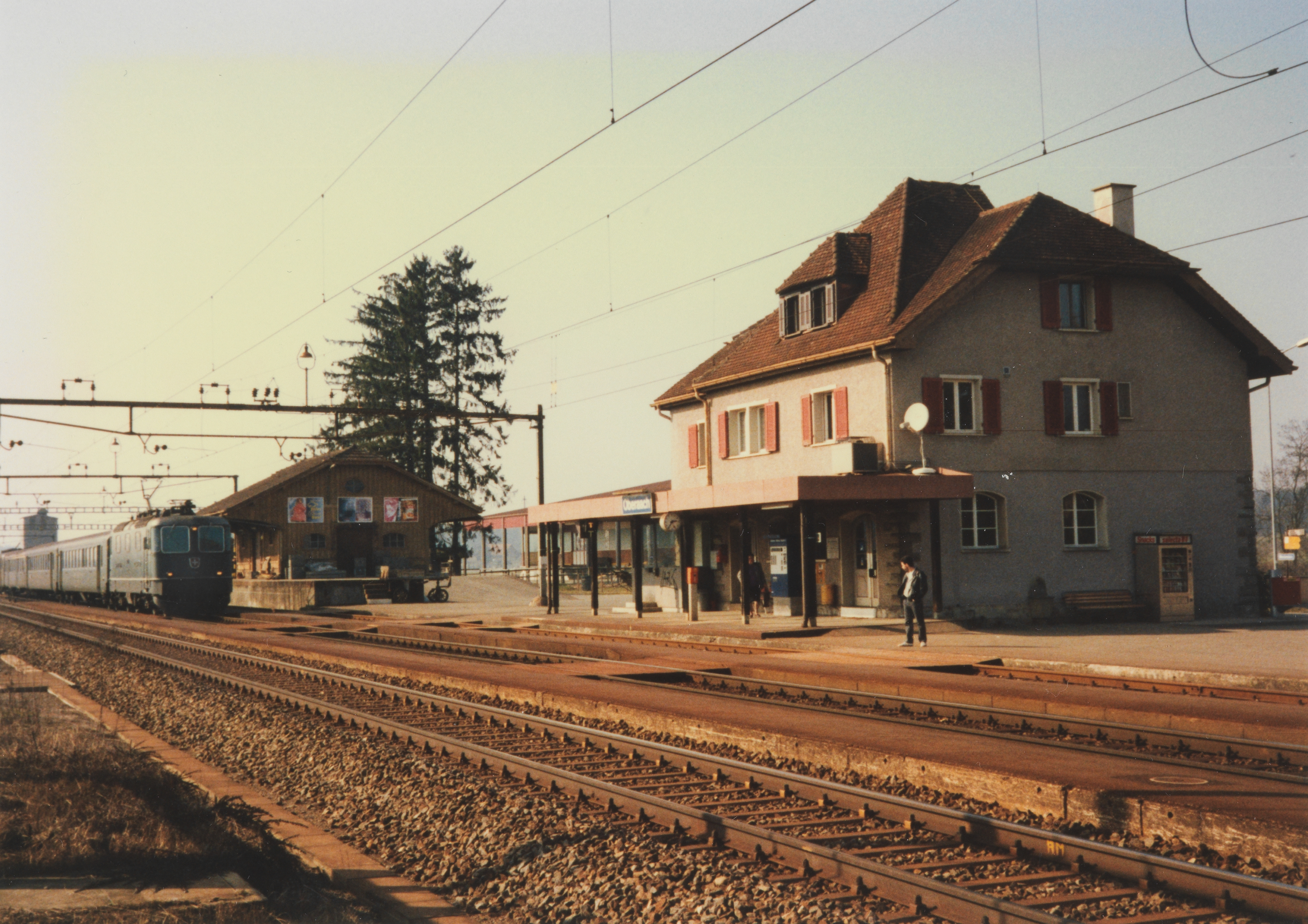

General information
- Location: Amriswil; Switzerland
- Coordinates: 47°33′29″N 9°15′50″E
- Elevation: 444 m (1,457 ft)
- Owner: Swiss Federal Railways
- Line: Winterthur–Romanshorn line
- Train operators: Thurbo

Other information
- Fare zone: 226 (Tarifverbund Ostwind)

Services
Preceding station	St. Gallen S-Bahn	Following station
Erlen towards Wil	S10	Amriswil towards Romanshorn
Erlen towards Winterthur	SN30 Limited service	Amriswil towards Romanshorn
Location
- Location within Switzerland Location within Canton of Thurgau

Oberaach railway station (German: Bahnhof Oberaach) is a railway station in the village of Oberaach, within the municipality of Amriswil, in the Swiss canton of Thurgau. It is an intermediate stop on the Winterthur–Romanshorn line and is served by local trains only.

== Services ==
Oberaach is served by the S10 of the St. Gallen S-Bahn:

- S10: half-hourly service to Wil and to Romanshorn, via Weinfelden.

During weekends, the station is served by a nighttime S-Bahn service (SN30), offered by Ostwind fare network, and operated by Thurbo for St. Gallen S-Bahn.

- St. Gallen S-Bahn SN30: hourly service to Winterthur and to Romanshorn, via Frauenfeld.

== See also ==
- Bodensee S-Bahn
- Rail transport in Switzerland
