= S23 (ZVV) =

Railway service in Switzerland

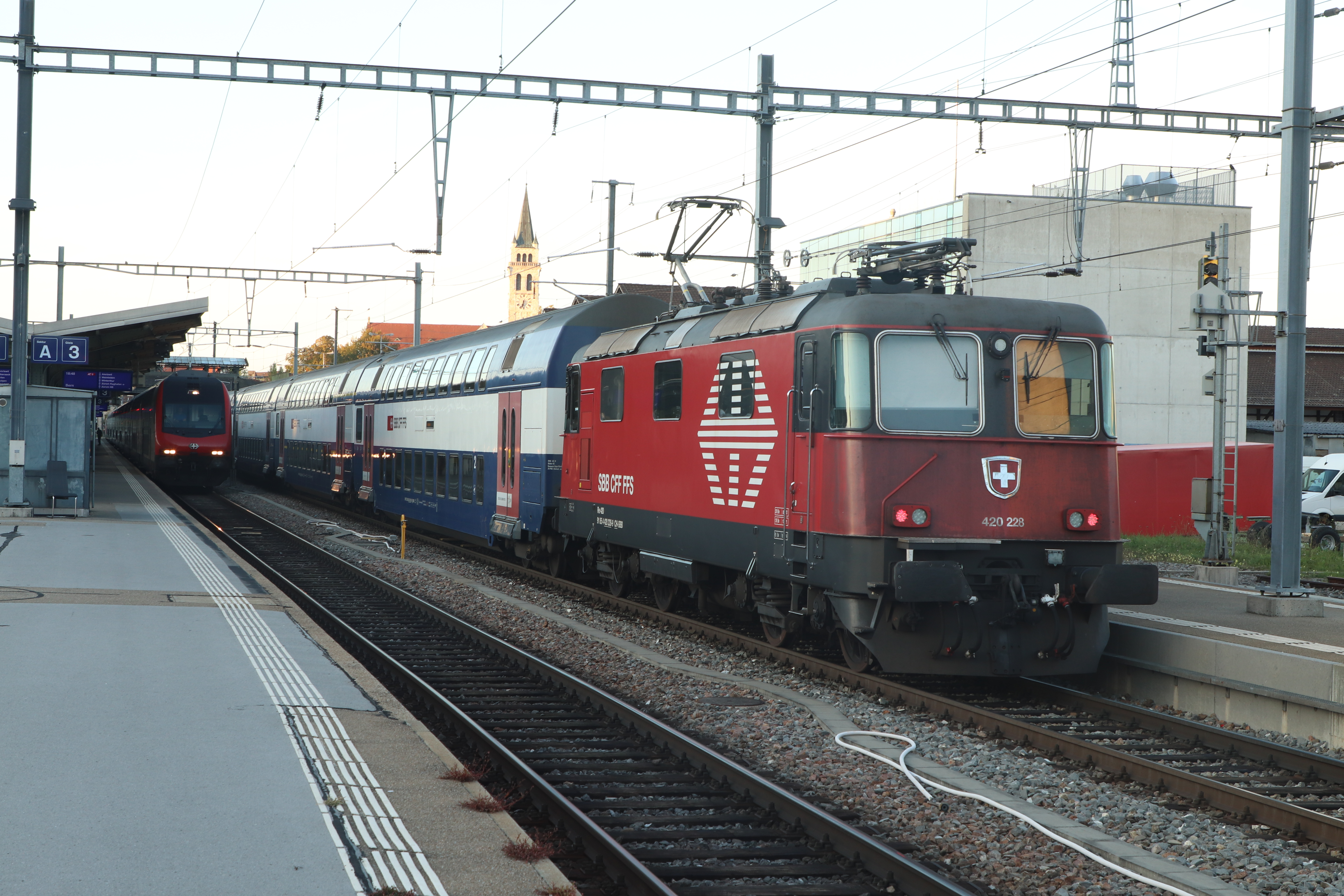
- Refurbished Re 420 (LION) locomotives, head and tail, and double-deck carriages as S23 service in Romanshorn

Overview
- Status: Operational
- Termini: Zürich HB; Winterthur/Romanshorn
- Stations: 8
- Website: Official website

Service
- Type: S-Bahn
- System: Zürich S-Bahn
- Operator(s): Swiss Federal Railways
- Rolling stock: Re 420 (LION) locomotives and double-deck passenger carriages

Technical
- Track gauge: 1,435 mm (4 ft 8 1/2 in)

Zürich S-Bahn network as of December 2018. (S23 line is indicated on the current map, see:)

The S23 is a regional railway line of the Zürich S-Bahn that operates only during rush hour.

At Zürich HB, trains of the S23 service usually depart from underground tracks (Gleis) 41–44 (Museumstrasse station).

== Route ==
- S23 Zürich HB–Zürich Stadelhofen–Winterthur–Frauenfeld–Romanshorn

The service calls only at major stations between Zürich (canton of Zürich) and Romanshorn (Canton of Thurgau) on the shores of Lake Constance. Only some trains operate between Winterthur and Romanshorn, while others have Winterthur as their terminus.

- Zürich Hauptbahnhof
- Stadelhofen
- Winterthur
- Frauenfeld
- Weinfelden
- Sulgen
- Amriswil
- Romanshorn

== Scheduling ==
The S23 operates during peak-hours only: five trains from Winterthur to Zürich HB in the morning (two originate in Romanshorn), and four trains from Zürich HB to Winterthur in the evenings (with two continuing to Romanshorn). The journey between Zürich and Winterthur, including the sole intermediate stop in Stadelhofen, requires 24 minutes. Zürich to Romanshorn requires 69 minutes.

== Rolling stock ==
Services are operated by two (head and tail) refurbished Re 420 (LION) locomotives pushing or pulling double-deck passenger carriages.

== History ==
The S23 was introduced in the timetable revision of December 2015 as a peak-hour service between Zürich HB and Winterthur. The S23 supplemented the S11, then a peak-hour service between Zürich Hardbrücke and Winterthur, and the S12, which operated on an hourly schedule and was "notorious" for overcrowding. Some S23 services continued to Romanshorn.

At the time of its introduction the S23 was the only service on the Zürich S-Bahn whose carriages were not air-conditioned, leading to complaints from passengers during the summer months.

== See also ==
- Rail transport in Switzerland
- List of railway stations in Zurich
- Public transport in Zurich
- ZVV fare zones
