= Amriswil railway station =

Railway station in Amriswil, Switzerland

Amriswil
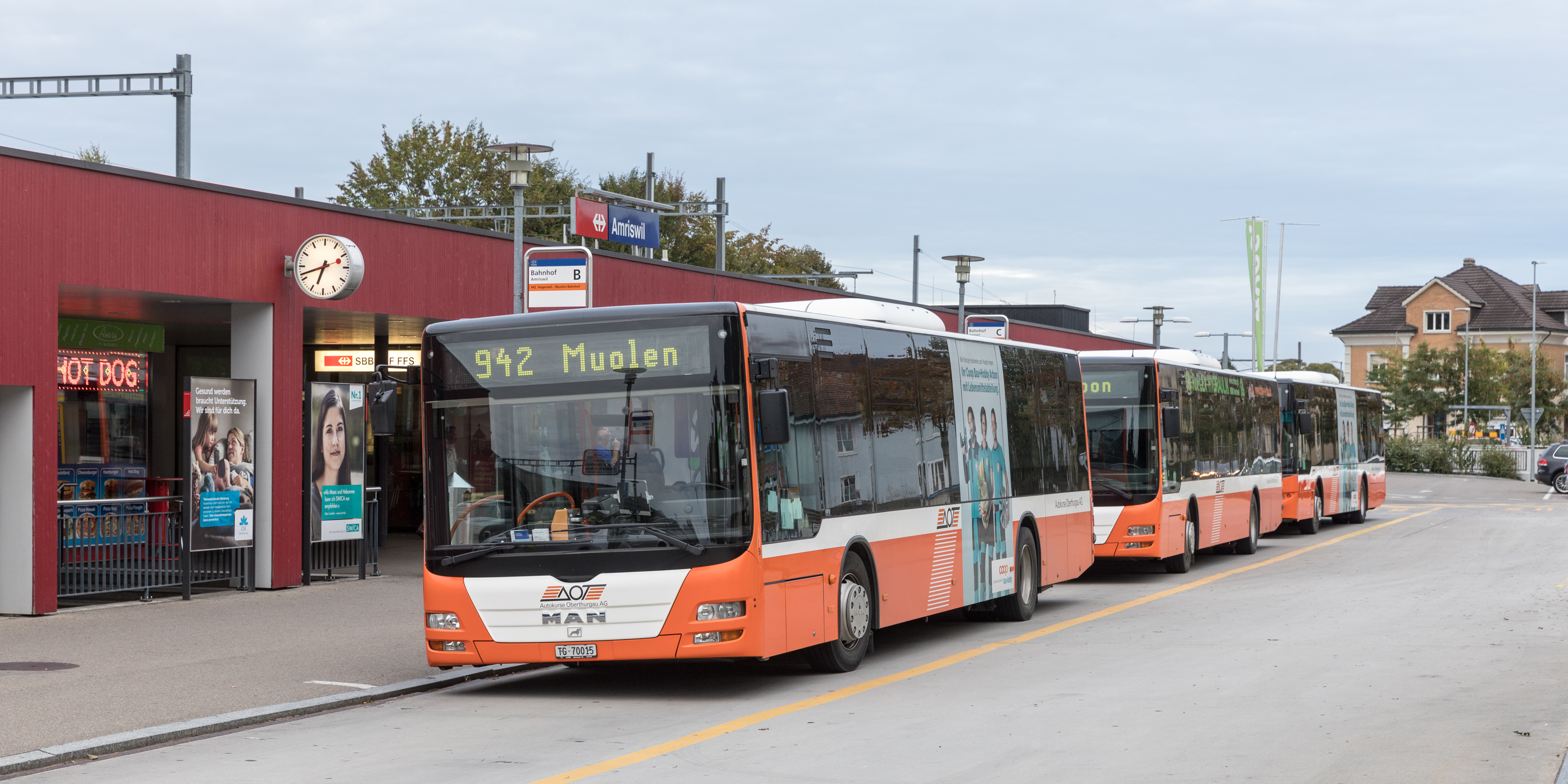

General information
- Location: Amriswil; Switzerland
- Coordinates: 47°33′01″N 9°18′08″E
- Elevation: 437 m (1,434 ft)
- Owner: Swiss Federal Railways
- Line: Winterthur–Romanshorn line
- Train operators: Thurbo, Swiss Federal Railways

Other information
- Fare zone: 226 (Tarifverbund Ostwind)

Services
Preceding station	SBB CFF FFS	Following station
Weinfelden towards Brig	IC 8	Romanshorn Terminus
Weinfelden towards Interlaken Ost	IC 81	Romanshorn Terminus
Preceding station	St. Gallen S-Bahn	Following station
Weinfelden Terminus	S7	Romanshorn towards Lindau-Insel
Oberaach towards Wil	S10	Romanshorn Terminus
Oberaach towards Winterthur	SN30 Limited service	Romanshorn Terminus
Preceding station	Zurich S-Bahn	Following station
Sulgen towards Zürich HB	S23	Romanshorn Terminus
Location
- Location within Switzerland Location within Canton of Thurgau

Amriswil railway station (German: Bahnhof Amriswil) is a railway station in Amriswil, in the Swiss canton of Thurgau. It is an intermediate stop on the Winterthur–Romanshorn line and is served by local and long-distance trains.

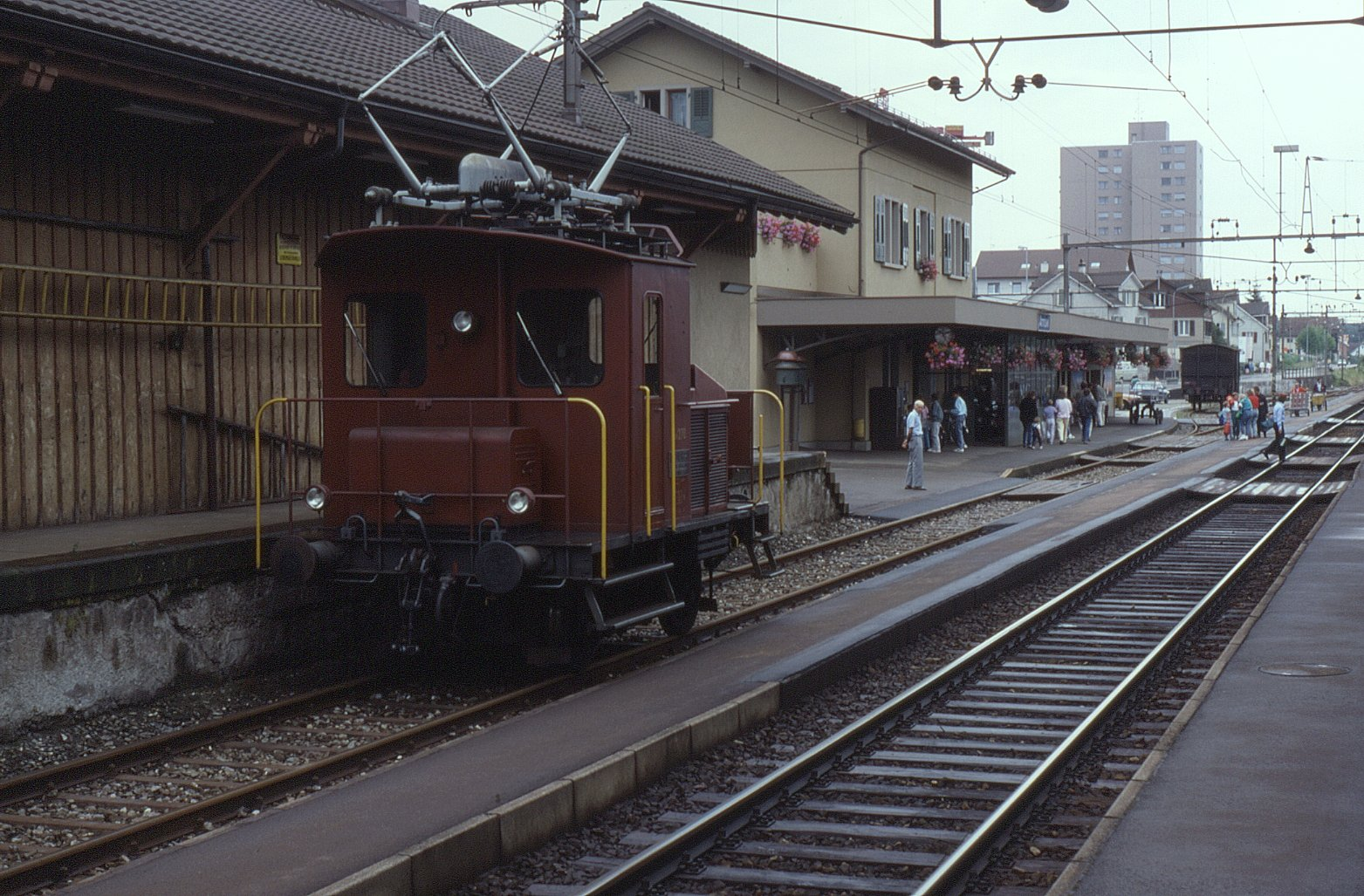
An SBB shunting locomotive at Amriswil in 1988

== Services ==
As of the December 2022 timetable change, the following services stop at Amriswil:

- InterCity /: hourly service between Romanshorn and Spiez; trains continue from Spiez to Brig or Interlaken Ost.
- St. Gallen S-Bahn:
  - S7: hourly service between Weinfelden and Rorschach.
  - S10: half-hourly service between Wil and Romanshorn, via Weinfelden.
- Zurich S-Bahn S23: peak-hour service between Zürich main station and Romanshorn via Zürich Stadelhofen.

During weekends, the station is served by a nighttime S-Bahn service (SN30), offered by Ostwind fare network, and operated by Thurbo for St. Gallen S-Bahn.

- St. Gallen S-Bahn SN30: hourly service to Winterthur and to Romanshorn, via Frauenfeld.

== See also ==
- Bodensee S-Bahn
- Rail transport in Switzerland
