= Luís Carlos (footballer, born 1977) =

Brazilian footballer

Personal information
- Full name: Luís Carlos Lima de Souza
- Date of birth: 1 June 1977 (age 49)
- Place of birth: São Paulo, Brazil
- Height: 1.76 m (5 ft 9 in)
- Position: Midfielder

Senior career*
Years	Team	Apps	(Gls)
2002	Carajás	94	(13)
2003–2007	FC Sion	64	(12)
2007–2008	Yverdon-Sport	32	(3)
- * Club domestic league appearances and goals as of 11:05, 5 October 2008 (UTC)

Luís Carlos Lima de Souza (born 1 June 1977, in São Paulo) is a Brazilian former football player.

== Football career ==
Luís Carlos was signed by FC Sion in January 2003 from Carajás of Pará state. He played in FC Sion until summer 2007 joined Yverdon-Sport.

== Honours ==
Sion

- Swiss Cup: 2005–06
