= Manuel Bühler =

Colombian-Swiss footballer (born 1983)

Personal information
- Full name: Manuel Alfonso Bühler
- Date of birth: 1 September 1983 (age 43)
- Height: 1.70 m (5 ft 7 in)
- Position: Midfielder

Team information
- Current team: Yverdon-Sport FC

Youth career
- FC Cortaillod

Senior career*
Years	Team	Apps	(Gls)
1999–2001	Neuchâtel Xamax	36	(1)
2001–2002	Grasshopper Club Zürich	1	(0)
2002–2003	FC Aarau	9	(0)
2003–2004	Grasshopper Club Zürich	9	(0)
2004–2006	FC Sion	41	(4)
2006	FC Sion B	12	(2)
2007	Yverdon-Sport FC	12	(5)
2007–2008	FC Chiasso	12	(2)
2008–	Yverdon-Sport FC	14	(3)

International career
- Switzerland U-21
- * Club domestic league appearances and goals as of 18 February 2009

Manuel Bühler (born 1 September 1983) is a Colombian-Swiss football player. He currently plays for Yverdon-Sport FC.
