= Pape Seydou Diop =

Senegalese footballer

Personal information
- Full name: Pape Seydou Diop
- Date of birth: 12 January 1979 (age 47)
- Place of birth: Dakar, Senegal
- Height: 1.77 m (5 ft 10 in)
- Position: Midfielder

Senior career*
Years	Team	Apps	(Gls)
1995–1996	Sedan	12	(0)
1996–2001	Lens	1	(0)
1996–2001	→ Lens B (loan)	69	(8)
1998–1999	→ Valenciennes (loan)	14	(1)
1999	→ Norwich	7	(0)
2000	→ RC Paris	2	(0)
2001–2002	Olympique Noisy-le-Sec		
2002–03	Aarau	15	(0)
2003	Dinamo București	8	(0)
2004–2005	Levallois		
2005–2006	Arras Football		

International career
2000	Senegal	3	(1)
- * Club domestic league appearances and goals

Pape Seydou Diop (born 12 January 1979) is a Senegalese retired international footballer.

Seydou Diop has played for Lens, Valenciennes, Norwich, RC Paris, Aarau, Dinamo București, Levallois and Arras Football.

He made three appearances and scored one goal for the Senegal national team in the year 2000.

== Honours ==
Dinamo București

- Romanian Cup: 2002–03
