= Cyrill Gloor =

Swiss footballer (born 1982)

Personal information
- Full name: Cyrill Gloor
- Date of birth: 23 May 1982 (age 44)
- Place of birth: Switzerland
- Height: 1.78 m (5 ft 10 in)
- Position: Defender

Team information
- Current team: FC Concordia Basel

Senior career*
Years	Team	Apps	(Gls)
2002	FC Aarau	4	(0)
2003–2008	FC Concordia Basel		
2008–	BSC Old Boys		
- * Club domestic league appearances and goals as of 28 July 2006 ‡ National team caps and goals as of 28 July 2006

Cyrill Gloor (born 23 May 1982) is a footballer from Switzerland who currently plays as defender for Old Boys Basel in the Swiss 1. Liga.

Gloor made four appearances in the Nationalliga A for FC Aarau.

== See also ==
- Football in Switzerland
- List of football clubs in Switzerland
