= Fernando Screpis =

Argentine footballer

Personal information
- Full name: Fernando Daniel Screpis
- Date of birth: April 10, 1979 (age 47)
- Place of birth: Buenos Aires, Argentina
- Position: Midfielder

Team information
- Current team: Club Social y Deportivo Liniers

Senior career*
Years	Team	Apps	(Gls)
1999	Huracán	1	
2000–2001	Espoli	32	(11)
2001	Benevento	43	(12)
2002	Sion	16	
2004	Inter Riviera Maya	47	(20)
2004–2005	Ponferradina	10	(1)
2005–2006	Talleres (RE)	34	(15)
2006	Defensores de Belgrano		
2007–2008	FBK Kaunas	23	(9)
2008	Heart of Midlothian	5	(0)
2009–2011	Ayia Napa		
2011–2012	Deportivo Español		
2012–2013	Dock Sud		
2013–2014	Club Social y Deportivo Liniers		
2014–2016	Sacachispas Fútbol Club		
2016–2017	Argentino de Merlo		
- * Club domestic league appearances and goals as of 16 November 2012

Fernando Daniel Screpis (born 10 April 1979, in Buenos Aires, Argentina) is a retired professional footballer.

== Club career ==
Screpis signed a three-and-a-half-year deal with the Edinburgh club during a trial period in Austria in the summer of 2007, however it did not take effect until January 1, 2008, with Screpis agreeing to spend six months with Vladimir Romanov-sponsored FBK Kaunas before defecting to Scotland. On January 31, Hearts completed the signing of the Argentine midfielder, who made his first-team debut in the 3–0 win at Inverness. His first start for the club was in a 2–0 defeat to Kilmarnock FC. His future at Tynecastle was thrown into doubt in July 2008, as he was not included in Csaba Laszlo's provisional squad for the club's tour of Austria. The same evening he appeared as a trialist for Plymouth Argyle. Screpis revealed on July 21, 2008, that Hearts had cancelled his contract.

Screpis appeared as a trialist for MLS Seattle Sounders FC in Feb. 2009. However the American-based team failed to sign him. Fernando Screpis then finally found a team in the summer of 2009, AO Agia Napa in Cyprus.

After leaving AO Agia Napa after just one season, Fernando moved back to his hometown of Argentina and is currently playing for Club Social y Deportivo Liniers.
