= Piu (Brazilian footballer) =

Brazilian footballer

Personal information
- Full name: Fabrício Nogueira Nascimento
- Date of birth: 1 October 1976 (age 50)
- Place of birth: Pereira Barreto, Brazil
- Height: 1.83 m (6 ft 0 in)
- Position: Striker

Team information
- Current team: FC Wohlen

Senior career*
Years	Team	Apps	(Gls)
- Ferroviária
- FC Baden
1997–1998	Waldhof Mannheim	18	(2)
1998–2000	FC Schaffhausen	59	(15)
2000–2001	FC Wangen bei Olten	30	(13)
2002	FC Lucerne	11	(5)
2002–2006	FC Wohlen	51	(10)
2006–2007	SC Kriens	32	(9)
2007–2008	FC Wohlen	34	(7)
2008–2010	SC Kriens	18	(9)
2010–	FC Wohlen		
- * Club domestic league appearances and goals

Fabrício Nogueira Nascimento (born 1 October 1976 in Pereira Barreto) is a Brazilian footballer. He plays for SC Kriens.

He was known as Bill in Brazil and Piu in Switzerland. Although spending almost ten years in Switzerland, he never played in Swiss Super League.
