= Owusu Benson =

Ghanaian footballer (born 1977)

Benson Owusu
Personal information
- Full name: Owusu Benson
- Date of birth: 22 March 1977 (age 49)
- Place of birth: Accra, Ghana
- Height: 1.75 m (5 ft 9 in)
- Position: Midfielder

Senior career*
Years	Team	Apps	(Gls)
1994	Hearts of Oak	19	(6)
1995	Sportul Studenţesc	18	(0)
1995	FC Solothurn	5	(0)
1996–1997	Yverdon-Sport	43	(12)
1997–1998	SC Kriens	24	(4)
1998–1999	FC Sion	33	(3)
2000	JEF United Ichihara	23	(2)
2001–2002	FC Wil	40	(1)
2002–2003	SR Delémont	33	(2)
2004–2008	SC Kriens	100	(12)
2009–2011	SC Buochs	30	(2)
2011–2012	FC Sursee		

International career
1999	Ghana	1	(0)
- * Club domestic league appearances and goals

Owusu Benson or Benson Owusu (born 22 March 1977) is a retired Ghanaian football player.

== Career ==
He played in Switzerland since 1995, except one and a half year left for JEF United Ichihara Japan. He also holds a Swiss passport.

On Monday, 31 March 2008, he suffered a cardiac arrest during a training session. Owusu was successfully resuscitated and fell into coma, from which he recovered on 3 April 2008.

Benson played for SC Kriens club since 9 July 2004 and joined in January 2009 to SC Buochs.

== Personal life ==
Benson is the father of the Swiss footballer Tyron Owusu.

== Club statistics ==
Club performance			League	
Season	Club	League	Apps	Goals
Romania			League	
1994/95	Sportul Studenţesc București	Divizia A	18	0
Switzerland			League	
1995/96	Solothurn	Nationalliga B	0	0
1995/96	Yverdon-Sport	Nationalliga B	12	5
1996/97	Yverdon-Sport	Nationalliga B	31	7
1997/98	Kriens	Nationalliga A	24	4
1998/99	Sion	Nationalliga A	33	3
Japan			League	
2000	JEF United Ichihara	J1 League	23	2
Switzerland			League	
2000/01	Wil	Nationalliga B	10	0
2001/02	Wil	Nationalliga B	30	1
2002/03	Delémont	Nationalliga A	33	2
2004/05	Kriens	Challenge League	31	1
2005/06	Kriens	Challenge League	25	5
2006/07	Kriens	Challenge League	33	5
2007/08	Kriens	Challenge League	25	7
2008/09	Kriens	1. Liga		
2009/10	Buochs	2. Liga Interregional		
Country	Romania		18	0
Country	Switzerland		287	40
Country	Japan		23	2
Total			328	42

== National team statistics ==
Ghana national team
Year	Apps	Goals
1999	1	0
Total	1	0
