= Augustine Simo =

Cameroonian footballer

Personal information
- Date of birth: 18 September 1978 (age 48)
- Place of birth: Bangangté, Cameroon
- Height: 1.77 m (5 ft 10 in)
- Position: Midfielder

Senior career*
Years	Team	Apps	(Gls)
1994–1995	PWD Bamenda		
1995	Aigle Nkongssamba		
1995–1996	Torino	8	(0)
1996–1997	Lugano	29	(0)
1997–1998	Saint-Étienne	18	(2)
1999–2003	Neuchâtel Xamax	130	(12)
2003–2004	Zürich	22	(0)
2004–2006	Aarau	46	(1)
2006–2013	Urania Genève Sport	146	(33)
2006–2007	→ Hapoel Petah Tikva (loan)	14	(0)

International career
1995–1998	Cameroon	23	(0)
- * Club domestic league appearances and goals

Augustine Simo (born 18 September 1978) is a Cameroonian former professional footballer who played as midfielder.

He played for several clubs in Europe, including AS Saint-Étienne in France and AC Lugano, Neuchâtel Xamax, FC Zürich, FC Aarau, and Urania Genève Sport in Switzerland.

He was a member of the Cameroon national team which participated in 1998 FIFA World Cup. He also played at the 1995 FIFA World Youth Championship in Qatar.
