= Henry Ekubo =

Nigerian footballer

Personal information
- Full name: Henry Ekubo
- Date of birth: 17 August 1982 (age 44)
- Place of birth: Jos, Nigeria
- Height: 1.80 m (5 ft 11 in)
- Position: Striker

Youth career
- 1996–1998: Jos Highlanders
- 1998–1999: FC Rorschach

Senior career*
Years	Team	Apps	(Gls)
2000–2004	St. Gallen	16	(0)
1999–2002	→ St. Gallen B	26	(4)
2002–2003	→ Kriens (loan)	26	(1)
2004–2005	YF Juventus	24	(3)
2005	FC Altstetten	11	(6)
2006	FC Rapperswil-Jona	12	(3)
2006–2007	FC Chur 97	28	(5)
2007	FC Gossau	9	(0)
2008–2009	SC Brühl SG		
2009–2010	FC Linth 04		
2010–2011	FC Kreuzlingen	8	(3)

International career
2003–2004	Nigeria	2	(0)
- * Club domestic league appearances and goals

Henry Ekubo (born 17 August 1982) is a retired Nigerian footballer.

== Football career ==
Ekubo started his career at St. Gallen. He made his debut in 2000–01 season and move on loan to Kriens of Challenge League. He returned to St. Gallen in 2003–04 season.

Ekubo left the club in summer 2004, and played in the lower league. Except for YF Juventus and FC Gossau in the Challenge League, he played in 1. Liga clubs.
