= Roman Friedli =

Swiss footballer (born 1979)

Personal information
- Full name: Roman Friedli
- Date of birth: 13 March 1979 (age 47)
- Place of birth: Kathmandu, Nepal
- Height: 1.72 m (5 ft 8 in)
- Position: Midfielder

Team information
- Current team: FC Thun
- Number: 12

Senior career*
Years	Team	Apps	(Gls)
1996–1998	Neuchâtel Xamax	13	(0)
1998–2001	Yverdon-Sport	91	(2)
2001–2003	FC Aarau	49	(0)
2003–2005	BSC Young Boys	56	(0)
2006–2008	FC Thun	31	(1)
2008–2009	FC Vully		
2009–2011	FC Breitenrain Bern	53	(6)
2011	FC Köniz	7	(0)

International career
?–2002	Switzerland U-21	20	(0)
- * Club domestic league appearances and goals as of 16 July 2007

Roman Friedli (born 13 March 1979) is a Swiss retired professional footballer who last played for FC Köniz.

Friedli previously played in the Swiss Super League for Neuchâtel Xamax, Yverdon-Sport, FC Aarau and BSC Young Boys.

He joined FC Thun on 22 January 2006.
