= Marc Fiechter =

Swiss footballer (born 1975)

Personal information
- Date of birth: 13 June 1975 (age 51)
- Position: Midfielder

Senior career*
Years	Team	Apps	(Gls)
1992–1994	FC Grenchen		
1995	FC Solothurn		
1995–1997	FC Lugano		
1997	1. FC Nürnberg		
1998	FC St. Gallen		
1998–2000	FC Baden		
2000–2002	FC Aarau		
2002	SC Zofingen		
2003	SC Kriens		
2003–2004	FC Grenchen		
2004–2005	FC Subingen		
- * Club domestic league appearances and goals

Marc Fiechter (born 13 June 1975) is a retired Swiss football midfielder.
