= Claudio Circhetta =

Swiss football referee (born 1970)

- Born: 18 November 1970 (age 55); Muttenz, Switzerland
- Other occupation: Car salesman

Domestic
Years	League	Role
1988–2010	Swiss leagues	Referee
2000–2010	Swiss Super League	Referee

International
Years	League	Role
2005–2010	UEFA	Referee
2005–2010	FIFA	Referee

Claudio Circhetta (born 18 November 1970) is a Swiss former football referee. As a player in the Swiss junior leagues for over 20 years, Circhetta often disagreed with the referees, but instead of criticising them, he became a referee himself in 1988. In 2000, he was promoted to referee matches in the Swiss Super League, and five years later he became a FIFA-listed international official.

His first UEFA appointment was a third round match between Varteks and Lens in the 2005 UEFA Intertoto Cup. The following year, he took charge of his first UEFA Cup match in the tournament proper (following two qualifying matches), a first round match between Red Star Belgrade and Slovan Liberec. His first Champions League group stage appointment was a match between Celtic and Villarreal on 10 December 2008. His most prestigious appointment was as fourth official in the 2009 UEFA Champions League Final, alongside referee Massimo Busacca. He retired at the end of 2010 to take up the position of Swiss referees chief.
