= Elvir Melunović =

Swiss footballer (born 1979)

Personal information
- Date of birth: 17 July 1979 (age 47)
- Place of birth: SR Montenegro, SFR Yugoslavia (now Montenegro)
- Height: 1.78 m (5 ft 10 in)
- Position: Midfielder

Senior career*
Years	Team	Apps	(Gls)
1996–1998	FC Aarau	18	(1)
1998–2000	Servette	31	(1)
2000–2003	Grasshoppers	20	(2)
2001–2003	→ FC Aarau (loan)	58	(3)
2003–2005	Young Boys	43	(3)
2005–2006	Sambenedettese	1	(0)
2005	FC Schaffhausen	5	(0)
2006	FC Wil		
2006–2007	Neuchâtel Xamax		
2007	Sportfreunde Siegen	4	(0)
2007–2008	Lugano		
2008	SC Kriens		
2009–2012	FC Suhr		
2010	SC Zofingen		

International career
?–2002	Switzerland U21	29	(4)
- * Club domestic league appearances and goals

Elvir Melunović (born 17 July 1979) is a Swiss former professional footballer who played as a midfielder. He preferred to play as a left midfielder in the 4-4-2 formation and was a left-footed player. Born in SR Montenegro, SFR Yugoslavia, he represented the Switzerland U21 national team at international level.

Melunović played in Servette as they won in the Swiss Super League in 1999 and in Grasshoppers when they won in 2003. However, he did not manage to be part of the starting lineup in Grasshoppers. He played in the 2002 European U21 Championship as part of the "Titans" generation, where the Switzerland U21 national team achieved their best results up to that point by making it to the semi-finals. He was supposed to sign with a club from the French league, but this did not materialise. His contract extension with Young Boys was then terminated, and his career in professional football ended in 2007, participating afterwards as a player-coach. His first cup final was with Suhr in 2012 against Windisch in the Aargau Cup.
