= Mohamed Gouda =

Egyptian footballer (born 1979)

Personal information
- Full name: Mohamed Gouda Moussa Hamid
- Date of birth: 15 August 1979 (age 47)
- Place of birth: Suez, Egypt
- Height: 1.85 m (6 ft 1 in)
- Position: Midfielder

Senior career*
Years	Team	Apps	(Gls)
1997–2001	Al Ahly		
2002	FC Aarau	10	(0)
2002–2004	Al Ahly		
2004–2005	Ankaragücü	9	(0)
2005–2006	Al-Ittihad		
2006–2007	Assyriska FF	10	(0)
2007–2009	Haras El Hodood		
2009–2010	El-Masry		
2010–2013	El-Entag El-Harby		

International career
2000–2003	Egypt	10	(0)
- * Club domestic league appearances and goals

Mohamed Gouda (Arabic: محمد جودة ; born 15 August 1979) is a former Egyptian footballer.

== Club career ==
Gouda had a spell with Ankaragücü in the Turkish Super Lig.

== International career ==
Gouda has made 10 appearances for the senior Egypt national football team.
