= Ivan Benito =

Swiss footballer (born 1976)

Personal information
- Full name: Ivan Benito
- Date of birth: 27 August 1976 (age 50)
- Place of birth: Aarau, Switzerland
- Height: 1.83 m (6 ft 0 in)
- Position: Goalkeeper

Youth career
- FC Aarau

Senior career*
Years	Team	Apps	(Gls)
1996–2003	FC Aarau	167	(1)
2003–2005	Pistoiese	58	(0)
2005–2006	Juve Stabia	2	(0)
2007–2010	FC Aarau	83	(0)
2010–2011	Grasshoppers	11	(0)
2011–2013	Young Boys	1	(0)
2013–2014	FC Wohlen	5	(0)
Total		327	(1)
- * Club domestic league appearances and goals

Ivan Benito (born 27 August 1976) is a Swiss former professional footballer who played as goalkeeper.

He is the uncle of Loris Benito.
