= Oliver Maric =

Croatian-Swiss footballer (born 1981)

Oliver Marić
Personal information
- Full name: Oliver Marić
- Date of birth: 11 March 1981 (age 45)
- Place of birth: Zadar, SR Croatia, SFR Yugoslavia
- Height: 1.86 m (6 ft 1 in)
- Position: Right back

Senior career*
Years	Team	Apps	(Gls)
1999–2004	FC Lucerne	83	(1)
2004–2006	FC Schaffhausen	49	(0)
2006–2007	SC Kriens	32	(1)
2007–2009	FC Concordia Basel	61	(4)
2009–2010	FC Wohlen	28	(4)
2010–2011	Servette FC	4	(0)
- * Club domestic league appearances and goals as of 13 November 2007

Oliver Marić (born 11 March 1981) is a Croatian–Swiss former football player and current assistant manager of FC Stade Nyonnais.

He was previously a member of FC Wohlen, FC Schaffhausen, FC Lucerne and Servette FC. While growing up in Lucerne, Marić's family comes from Primošten on the Croatian coast.
