= Amriswil =

- Municipality
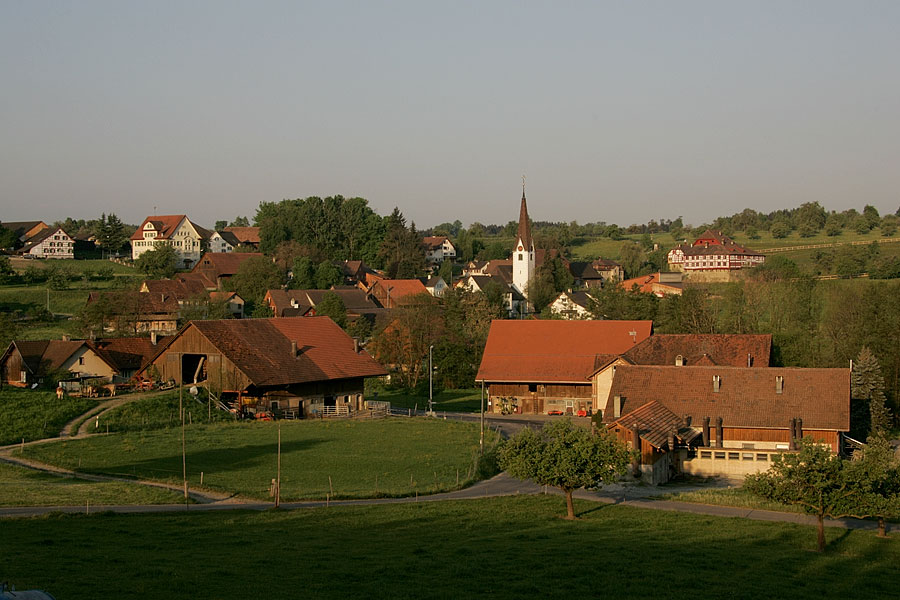
- Village Hagenwil

- Coat of arms
- Location of Amriswil
- Location within Switzerland Location within Canton of Thurgau
- Coordinates: 47°33′N 9°18′E
- Country: Switzerland
- Canton: Thurgau
- District: Amriswil

Government
  - Executive: Stadtrat with 9 members
  - Mayor: Stadtpräsident; Gabriel Macedo FDP/PRD (as of 2020)
  - Parliament: none (Kommissionen)

Area
  - Total: 19.02 km^{2} (7.34 sq mi)
- Elevation (evang.-protestant Church): 450 m (1,480 ft)

Population (December 2020)
  - Total: 14,211
  - Density: 747.2/km^{2} (1,935/sq mi)
- Demonym: German: Amriswiler(in)
- Time zone: UTC+01:00 (CET)
  - Summer (DST): UTC+02:00 (CEST)
- Postal codes: 8580 Amriswil, 8580 Biessenhofen, 8580 Hagenwil b. Amriswil, 8581 Schocherswil, 8587 Oberaach
- SFOS number: 4461
- ISO 3166 code: CH-TG
- Localities: Mühlebach, Hagenwil, Biessenhofen, Oberaach, Nideraach, Schocherswil, Auenhofen
- Surrounded by: Egnach, Erlen, Hefenhofen, Muolen (SG), Salmsach, Sommeri, Zihlschlacht-Sitterdorf
- Website: www.amriswil.ch

Amriswil (Low Alemannic: Amerschwiil) is a town and a municipality in Arbon District in the canton of Thurgau in Switzerland near the Lake Constance.

== History ==
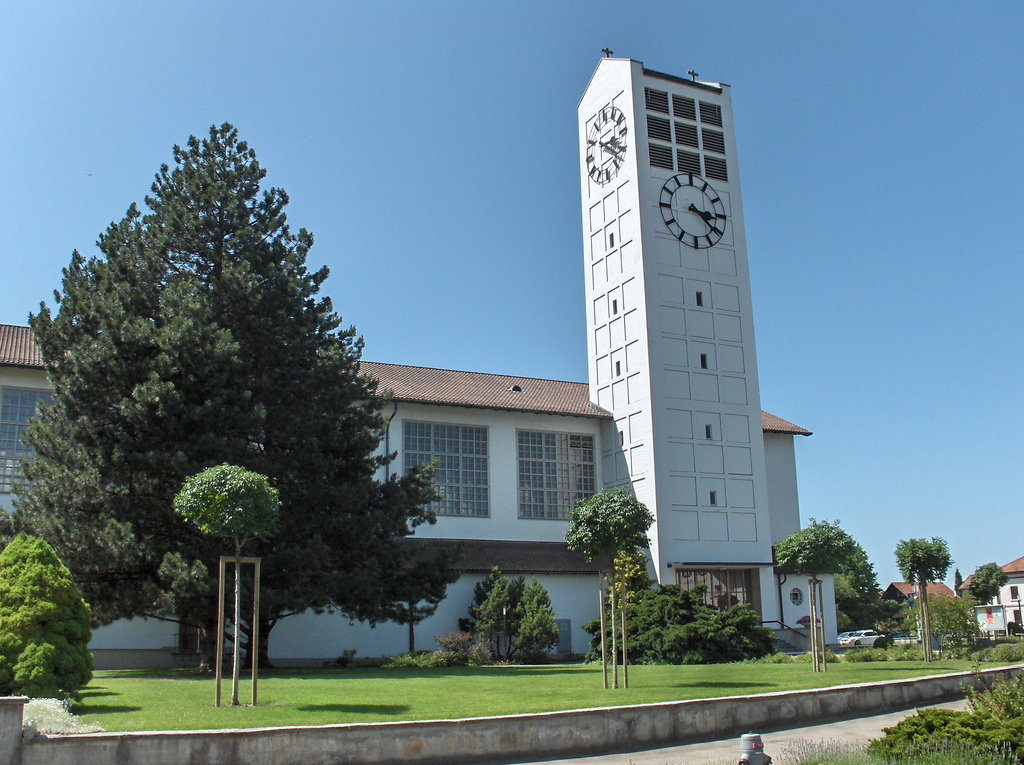
Catholic Church of St. Stephen

Amriswil is first mentioned in 799 as Amalgeriswilare. During the Middle Ages Amriswil and Brüschwil were part of a Bishop's fief. During the 15th century, the Helmsdorf family ruled in Eppishausen. In the early 17th century, the village of Amriswil was sold to Adam Tschudi of Glarus, and in 1665 the hospital was sold to St. Gallen. The court rights over Amriswil, Hölzli, Brüschwil and houses in Ruti and Giezenhaus were acquired by the city of Bürglen, which was under the control of the city of St. Gallen. This situation remained unchanged until 1798.

In the mid-14th century, chapel dedicated to Mary, was built in Amriswil. This chapel was part of the parish of Sommeri. After the Protestant Reformation of 1529 the majority in Sommeri returned to the old faith. However, the inhabitants of Amriswil remained with the Reformed faith and the chapel was given to Protestants. After 1630 there were weekly sermons, and after 1680 the chapel held regular Sunday services. Since 1710, the Reformed pastor lived in Amriswil, and it was united with Sommeri in a common parish. This remained the situation until migration in the 19th century changed the religious situation. In 1891, a large Reformed church was constructed in Amriswil. Then, in 1911 the Catholic parish of Amriswil and Sommeri separated and an independent parish was established in Amriswil, followed by the 1939 inauguration of the Catholic Church of St. Stephen.

Until about 1830 Amriswil was a nondescript village with some farming and viticulture. The introduction of cattle (1833), a monthly market (1840), the establishment of a dairy in Sommeri (1852), the emergence of large scale weaving and the opening of a knitting factory through the German refugee Joseph Sallmann (1849) were the beginning of a structural change. This was followed by the opening of the Northeastern Railway (1855). Between the square and the station a new settlement area grew up. The town center shifted from the previous settlement nuclei around the market and the road intersection in Köpplishaus toward the northeast. The rapid industrialization, however, can not be satisfactorily explained by the modest amounts of hydropower available or through the increased traffic. Rather, entrepreneurial initiative seems to have been an important stimulus. The companies Sallmann, Laib, and Tuchschmid were a center of manufacturing, known as the Trikoterie. While Esco and Löw were important representatives of the clothing and footwear industry. The growth led to structural problems especially in water supply, which were resolved definitively in 1952 with the purchase of water from Lake Constance.

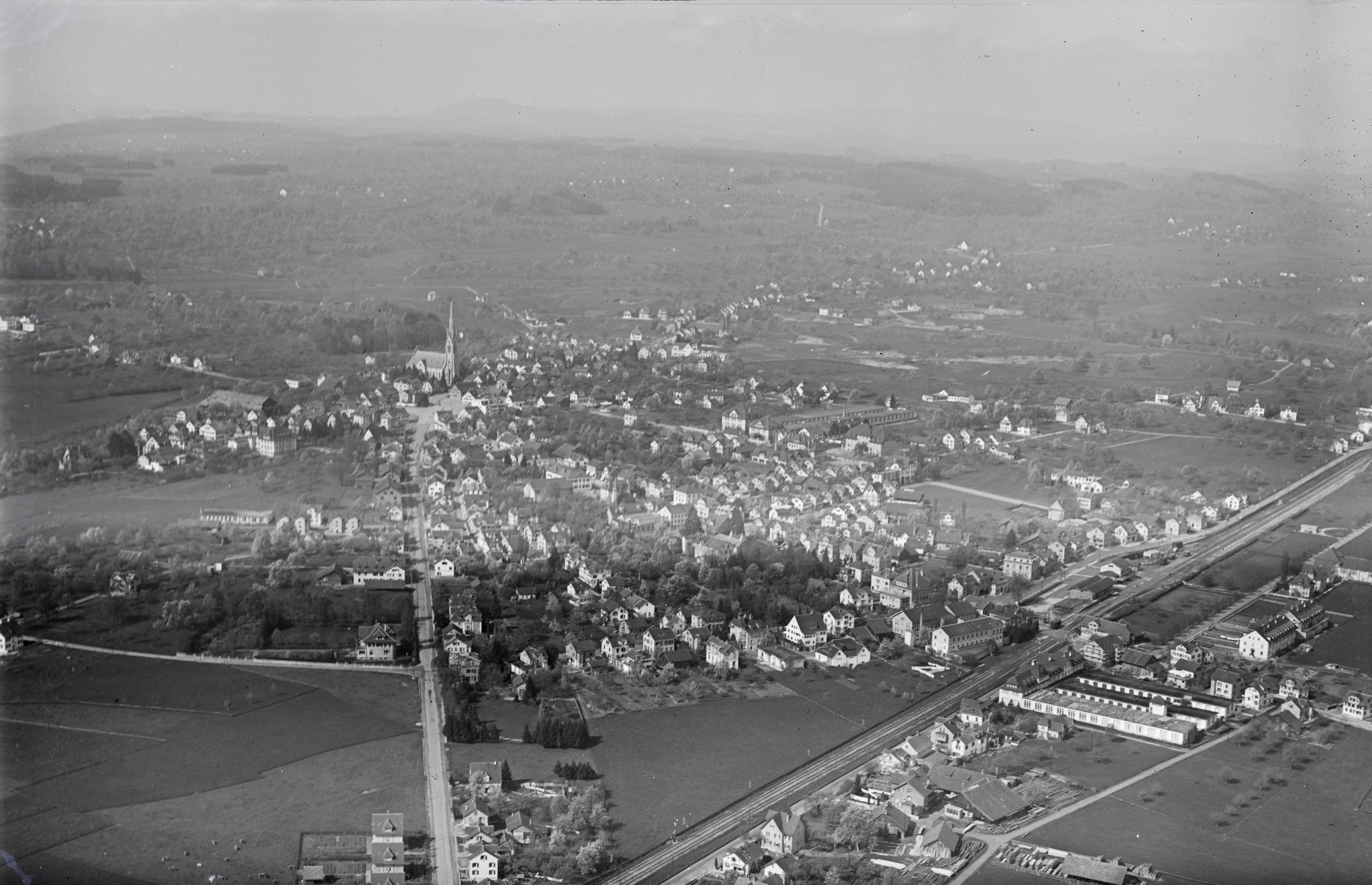
Aerial view from 300 m by Walter Mittelholzer (1923)

With the migration, especially from Italy, the number of foreigners increased from 7% in 1870 to 29% in 1910. Several Bürgergemeinden and villages merged into Amriswil, including Hemmerswil in 1925 and Mühlebach in 1932. The construction and services sectors – trade companies, hotels and restaurants, banks, handicapped services (1909), Cantonal Kindergarten training school (1975) – created new jobs. The Trikoterie remained a keystone of the local economy until around 1980, when the various companies had to close down. At this time the economy was more balanced. In 1990 there were about 90 commercial agriculture farms and about 3,300 jobs in the manufacturing and services sectors, of which 47% were in the services sector.

== Geography ==
Amriswil has an area, as of 2009, of 19.02 square kilometers (7.34 sq mi). Of this area, 12.85 km^{2} (4.96 sq mi) or 67.6% is used for agricultural purposes, while 2.47 km^{2} (0.95 sq mi) or 13.0% is forested. Of the rest of the land, 3.64 km^{2} (1.41 sq mi) or 19.1% is settled (buildings or roads), 0.04 km^{2} (9.9 acres) or 0.2% is either rivers or lakes and 0.01 km^{2} (2.5 acres) or 0.1% is unproductive land.

Of the built up area, industrial buildings made up 10.8% of the total area while housing and buildings made up 2.1% and transportation infrastructure made up 0.4%. Power and water infrastructure as well as other special developed areas made up 1.1% of the area while parks, green belts and sports fields made up 4.7%. Out of the forested land, 10.5% of the total land area is heavily forested and 2.5% is covered with orchards or small clusters of trees. Of the agricultural land, 54.5% is used for growing crops, while 13.0% is used for orchards or vine crops. All the water in the municipality is flowing water.

The municipality is located in Arbon District, at the crossing of the Winterthur-Arbon and Constance-St. Gallen roads. It consists of the village of Amriswil and the hamlets of Biessenhofen, Oberaach, Schocherswil and Räuchlisberg.

== Demographics ==
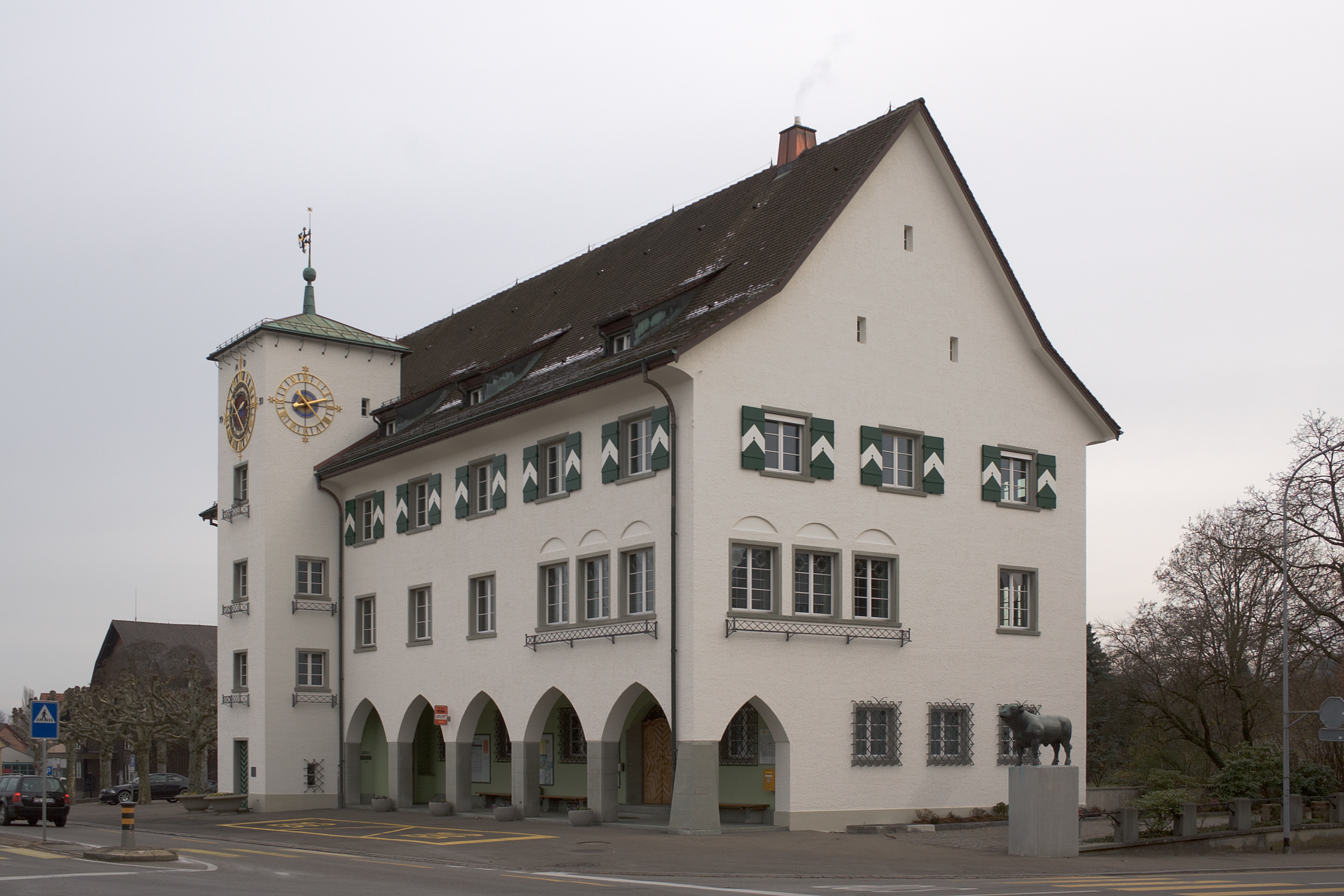
Municipal Administration Building

Amriswil has a population (as of December 2020) of 14,211. As of 2008, 26.4% of the population are foreign nationals. Over the last 10 years (1997–2007) the population has changed at a rate of 3.6%. Most of the population (as of 2000) speaks German (83.2%), with Italian being second most common ( 4.5%) and Albanian being third ( 4.4%).

As of 2008, the gender distribution of the population was 49.0% male and 51.0% female. The population was made up of 4,129 Swiss men (35.0% of the population), and 1,646 (14.0%) non-Swiss men. There were 4,549 Swiss women (38.6%), and 1,464 (12.4%) non-Swiss women.

In 2008 there were 80 live births to Swiss citizens and 39 births to non-Swiss citizens, and in same time span there were 99 deaths of Swiss citizens and 11 non-Swiss citizen deaths. Ignoring immigration and emigration, the population of Swiss citizens decreased by 19 while the foreign population increased by 28. There were 7 Swiss men who emigrated from Switzerland to another country, 5 Swiss women who emigrated from Switzerland to another country, 68 non-Swiss men who emigrated from Switzerland to another country and 60 non-Swiss women who emigrated from Switzerland to another country. The total Swiss population change in 2008 (from all sources) was an increase of 53 and the non-Swiss population change was an increase of 150 people. This represents a population growth rate of 1.8%.

The age distribution, as of 2009, in Amriswil is; 1,207 children or 10.1% of the population are between 0 and 9 years old and 1,540 teenagers or 12.9% are between 10 and 19. Of the adult population, 1,816 people or 15.3% of the population are between 20 and 29 years old. 1,410 people or 11.9% are between 30 and 39, 1,851 people or 15.6% are between 40 and 49, and 1,585 people or 13.3% are between 50 and 59. The senior population distribution is 1,100 people or 9.2% of the population are between 60 and 69 years old, 804 people or 6.8% are between 70 and 79, there are 487 people or 4.1% who are between 80 and 89, and there are 94 people or 0.8% who are 90 and older.

As of 2000, there were 4,604 private households in the municipality, and an average of 2.4 persons per household. In 2000 there were 1,128 single family homes (or 68.1% of the total) out of a total of 1,656 inhabited buildings. There were 185 two family buildings (11.2%), 96 three family buildings (5.8%) and 247 multi-family buildings (or 14.9%). There were 2,448 (or 21.6%) persons who were part of a couple without children, and 6,119 (or 53.9%) who were part of a couple with children. There were 645 (or 5.7%) people who lived in single parent home, while there are 51 persons who were adult children living with one or both parents, 47 persons who lived in a household made up of relatives, 73 who lived in a household made up of unrelated persons, and 381 who are either institutionalized or live in another type of collective housing.

The vacancy rate for the municipality, in 2008, was 2.07%. As of 2007, the construction rate of new housing units was 1.6 new units per 1000 residents. In 2000 there were 5,127 apartments in the municipality. The most common apartment size was the 4 room apartment of which there were 1,508. There were 234 single room apartments and 704 apartments with six or more rooms.

In the 2007 federal election the most popular party was the SVP which received 40.9% of the vote. The next three most popular parties were the CVP (14.89%), the FDP (13.41%) and the SP (11.79%). In the federal election, a total of 2,627 votes were cast, and the voter turnout was 37.8%.

The historical population is given in the following table:

year	population
1679	139 ^{a}
1850	492
1880	1,533
1910	3,322
1941	5,377
1970	7,601
1980	9,013
1990	10,426

^a Only includes Reformed Church members.

== Heritage sites of national significance ==
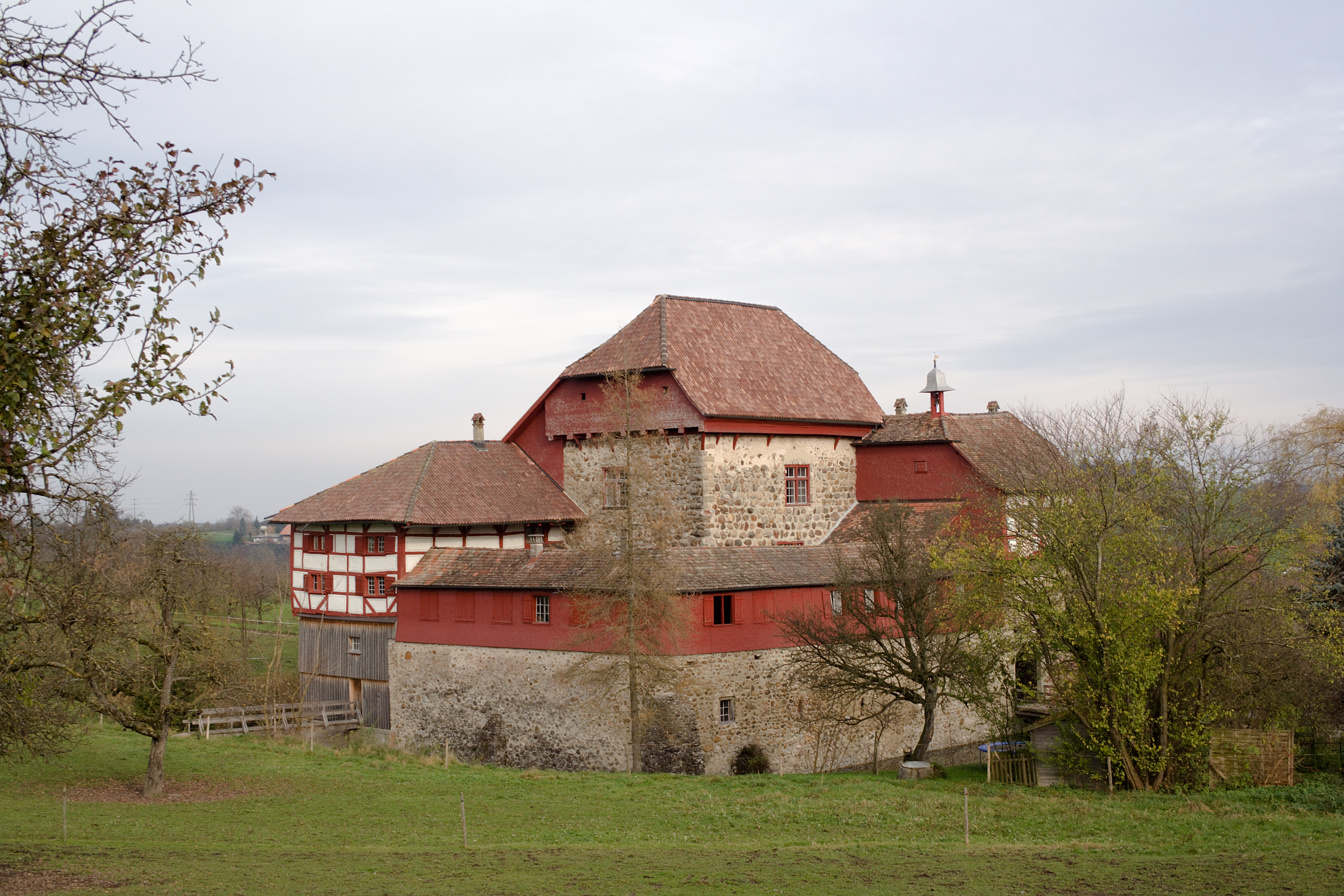
Hagenwil Castle

The Bohlenständerhaus Schrofen, Sallmann Carriage Collection and Hagenwil Castle are listed as Swiss heritage site of national significance. The village of Hagenwil bei Amriswil is part of the Inventory of Swiss Heritage Sites.

== Economy ==
As of 2007, Amriswil had an unemployment rate of 2.45%. As of 2005, there were 248 people employed in the primary economic sector and about 90 businesses involved in this sector. 1,764 people are employed in the secondary sector and there are 157 businesses in this sector. 2,622 people are employed in the tertiary sector, with 422 businesses in this sector.

In 2000 there were 7,531 workers who lived in the municipality. Of these, 3,071 or about 40.8% of the residents worked outside Amriswil while 2,080 people commuted into the municipality for work. There were a total of 6,540 jobs (of at least 6 hours per week) in the municipality. Of the working population, 9.5% used public transportation to get to work, and 48.8% used a private car.

== Religion ==
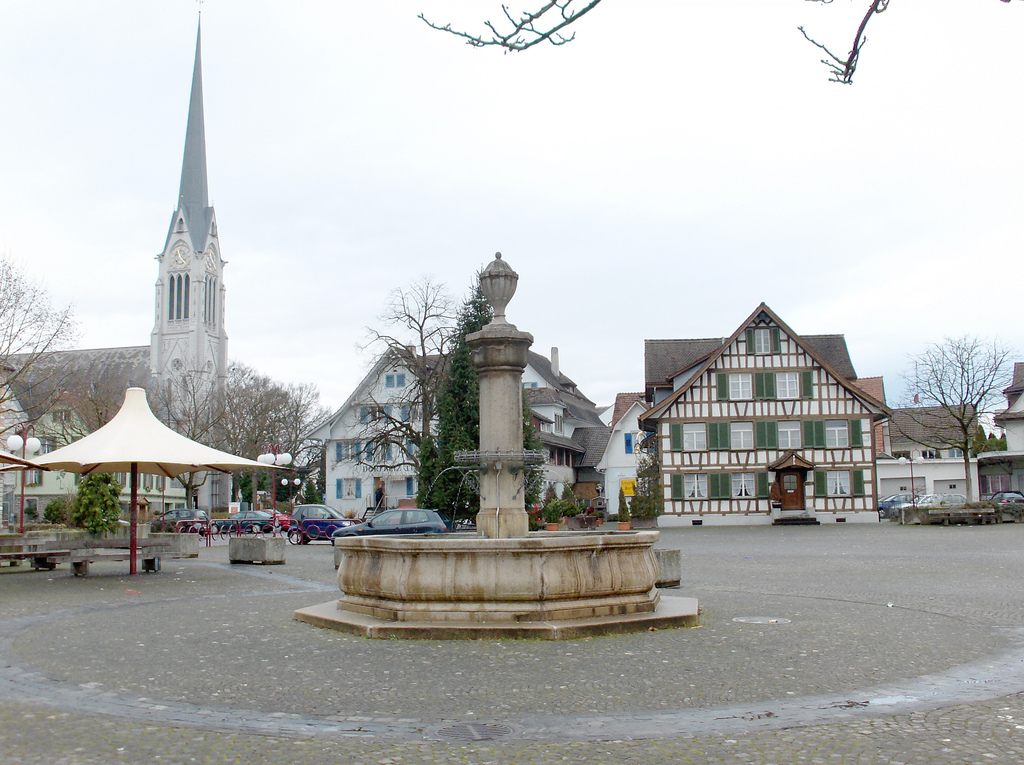
Reformed Church

From the 2000 census, 4,084 or 36.0% were Roman Catholic, while 4,090 or 36.0% belonged to the Swiss Reformed Church. Of the rest of the population, there were 8 Old Catholics (or about 0.07% of the population) who belonged to the Christian Catholic Church of Switzerland there are 398 individuals (or about 3.50% of the population) who belong to the Orthodox Church, and there are 451 individuals (or about 3.97% of the population) who belong to another Christian church. There were 3 individuals (or about 0.03% of the population) who were Jewish, and 1,135 (or about 9.99% of the population) who are Islamic. There are 88 individuals (or about 0.77% of the population) who belong to another church (not listed on the census), 591 (or about 5.20% of the population) belong to no church, are agnostic or atheist, and 509 individuals (or about 4.48% of the population) did not answer the question.

== Transport ==
Amriswil sits on the Winterthur–Romanshorn line between Wil and Romanshorn and is served by the St. Gallen S-Bahn at Amriswil and Oberaach.

== Education ==
In Amriswil about 62.2% of the population (between age 25 and 64) have completed either non-mandatory upper secondary education or additional higher education (either university or a Fachhochschule).

Amriswil is home to the Amriswil primary and secondary school district. In the 2008/2009 school year there are 1,474 students at either the primary or secondary levels. There are 320 children in the kindergarten, and the average class size is 18.82 kindergartners. Of the children in kindergarten, 157 or 49.1% are female, 103 or 32.2% are not Swiss citizens and 96 or 30.0% do not speak German natively. The lower and upper primary levels begin at about age 5–6 and lasts for 6 years. There are 458 children in who are at the lower primary level and 478 children in the upper primary level. The average class size in the primary school is 18.91 students. At the lower primary level, there are 240 children or 52.4% of the total population who are female, 123 or 26.9% are not Swiss citizens and 146 or 31.9% do not speak German natively. In the upper primary level, there are 228 or 47.7% who are female, 146 or 30.5% are not Swiss citizens and 172 or 36.0% do not speak German natively.

At the secondary level, students are divided according to performance. The secondary level begins at about age 12 and usually lasts 3 years. There are 280 teenagers who are in the advanced school, of which 149 or 53.2% are female, 44 or 15.7% are not Swiss citizens and 53 or 18.9% do not speak German natively. There are 240 teenagers who are in the standard school, of which 114 or 47.5% are female, 104 or 43.3% are not Swiss citizens and 112 or 46.7% do not speak German natively. Finally, there are 18 teenagers who are in special or remedial classes, of which 9 or 50.0% are female, 15 or 83.3% are not Swiss citizens and 15 or 83.3% do not speak German natively. The average class size for all classes at the secondary level is 20 students.

Amriswil is home to the Bibliothek-Ludothek library. The library has (as of 2008) 17,897 books or other media, and loaned out 82,856 items in the same year. It was open a total of 238 days with average of 17 hours per week during that year.

== Notable people ==
- Hans Mueller (1900 in Amriswil - 1965) a physicist and professor at the Massachusetts Institute of Technology, created the Mueller calculus
- Marianne Straub OBE (1909 in Amriswil – 1994) a commercial designers of textiles in Britain from the 1940s to 1960s
- Gottfried Weilenmann (1920 in Amriswil – 2018) a Swiss cyclist, professional from 1945 to 1952
- Elwyn Friedrich (1933 in Amriswil – 2012) a Swiss ice hockey player, competed at the 1964 Winter Olympics
