= Alex Tachie-Mensah =

Ghanaian former professional footballer (born 1977)

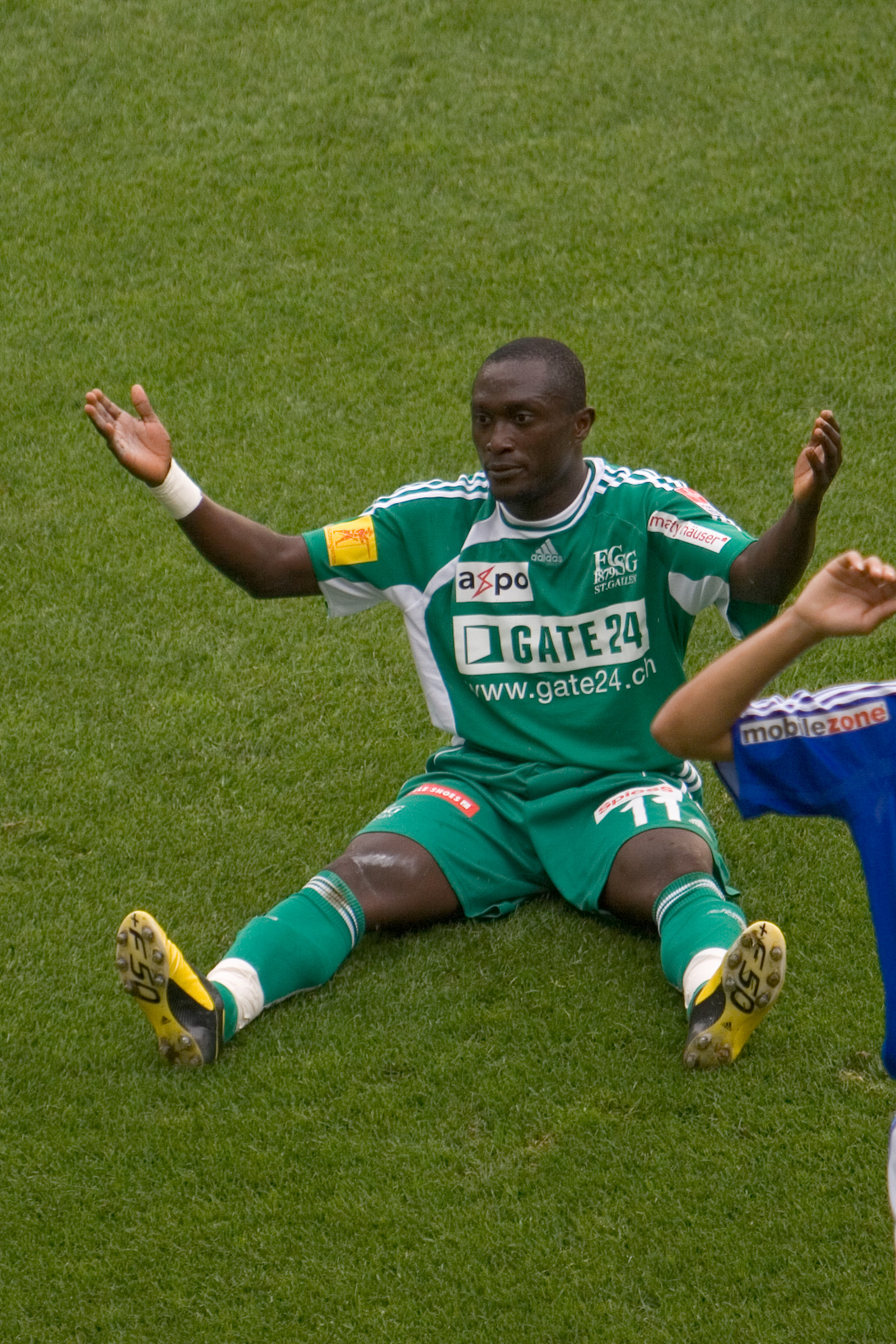
- Tachie-Mensah in 2007

Personal information
- Full name: Alexander Tachie-Mensah
- Date of birth: 15 February 1977 (age 49)
- Place of birth: Accra, Ghana
- Height: 5 ft 10 in (1.78 m)
- Position: Forward

Senior career*
Years	Team	Apps	(Gls)
1999–2000	Ebusua Dwarfs	39	(35)
2000–2002	Neuchâtel Xamax	55	(24)
2002–2009	St. Gallen	133	(48)
Total		227	(107)

International career
2001–2007	Ghana	11	(1)

Managerial career
- 2009–: FC Frauenfeld Youth
- * Club domestic league appearances and goals

Alexander Tachie-Mensah (born 15 February 1977) is a Ghanaian former professional footballer and manager who played as a forward. He began his playing career in Ghana before moving to Switzerland, where he spent much of his career. At international level, he represented the Ghana national team from 2001 to 2007, making 11 appearances and scoring one goal.

== Club career ==
Tachie-Mensah began his professional career with Ebusua Dwarfs in Ghana. In 2000, he travelled to Switzerland and signed with Neuchâtel Xamax, adapting quickly to his new surroundings to the extent that he appeared in a friendly match shortly after joining the club. After spending approximately one and a half seasons with Xamax, he moved to St. Gallen in 2002.

Tachie-Mensah made his debut for St. Gallen on 4 April 2002 in a match against Basel and subsequently became one of the team's key forwards. During the 2003–04 season, he scored 15 goals in 35 Swiss Super League appearances. He continued to demonstrate his goalscoring ability in the 2006–07 season, scoring more than 11 league goals. In January 2007, he extended his contract with the club, committing to stay until June 2009. Between 2002 and 2009, he made 194 competitive appearances for St. Gallen, scoring 81 goals.

However, in July 2007, he sustained a serious injury to his right foot and ankle during the opening match of the Swiss Super League season. Medical examinations revealed a fractured foot and damage to the ligaments in his right ankle. The injury required surgery, and he was expected to be sidelined for at least two months. As a result, he also missed the opportunity to play in a friendly match for the Ghana national team.

In 2008, he continued to struggle with his recovery after suffering a fracture-dislocation of his right ankle, along with damage to the ligaments and syndesmosis. Despite undergoing surgery and rehabilitation, he experienced further complications, including an infection. In May 2009, he underwent his fifth operation. As medical staff could not guarantee that he would be able to resume his playing career even after further rehabilitation, he ultimately decided to retire from professional football in June 2009. The injury brought an end to Tachie-Mensah's playing career after approximately seven years with St. Gallen.

== International career ==
Tachie-Mensah was first called up to the Ghana national team in 2001, making his international debut that year. He participated in the 2002 African Cup of Nations and continued to receive call-ups to the national team, appearing in international friendly matches and other fixtures.

In 2006, he was included in Ghana's squad for the 2006 FIFA World Cup, held in Germany. He came on as a substitute in the opening group-stage match against Italy but did not feature in the match against the Czech Republic. He subsequently appeared as a substitute in the group-stage match against the United States and in the round of 16 match against Brazil. Ghana defeated the United States 2–1 to advance to the knockout stage but were eliminated after losing 3–0 to the Brazil.

In August 2006, he scored his first international goal in a friendly match against the Togo. He continued to represent Ghana until 2007, recording 11 international appearances and one goal according to available statistics.

== Coaching career ==
After his retirement, Tachie-Mensah became the head coach an FC Frauenfeld youth team in August 2009.

He later became assistant coach at fifth-tier side FC Kreuzlingen.
