= Dušan Pavlović (footballer) =

Swiss footballer (born 1977)

Dusan Pavlović
Personal information
- Date of birth: 24 September 1977 (age 49)
- Place of birth: Bern, Switzerland
- Height: 6 ft 0 in (1.83 m)
- Position: Midfielder

Youth career
- –1997: Grasshopper Club Zürich

Senior career*
Years	Team	Apps	(Gls)
1995–1997	Grasshopper Club Zürich	3	(0)
1997–1999	AC Lugano	7	(0)
1999–2000	FC Baden	13	(2)
2000–2001	AC Bellinzona	7	(2)
2001–2003	FC Wil	42	(6)
2003–2005	FC St. Gallen	62	(10)
2005–2007	Grasshopper-Club Zurich	35	(1)
2007–2008	FC Erzgebirge Aue	7	(0)
2009	Hapoel Ra'anana	3	(0)
- * Club domestic league appearances and goals

Dušan Pavlović (born 24 September 1977) is a Swiss former football midfielder. He played a number of seasons in the Swiss Super League, appearing in over 100 games.
