= Pascal Cerrone =

Swiss footballer (born 1981)

Personal information
- Date of birth: 12 June 1981 (age 45)
- Place of birth: Geneva, Switzerland
- Height: 1.78 m (5 ft 10 in)
- Position: Defender

Senior career*
| Years | Team | Apps | (Gls) |
| 1999–2002 | FC Winterthur | 50 | (1) |
| 2002–2005 | FC Thun | 90 | (1) |
| 2005–2007 | FC St. Gallen | 62 | (0) |
| 2007–2012 | FC Vaduz | 145 | (8) |
| 2012–2015 | FC Wil | | |
| 2015–2017 | FC Frauenfeld | | |

International career^{‡}
| 2002–2004 | Switzerland U-21 | 14 | (1) |

Managerial career
- 2015–2017: FC Frauenfeld (player-manager)
- 2017–2020: FC Wil (assistant)
- 2020: FC Thun (interim)
- 2021–2022: Beveren (assistant)
- 2024–: FC Vaduz (assistant)
- * Club domestic league appearances and goals as of 8 July 2012 ‡ National team caps and goals as of 28 July 2006

Pascal Cerrone (born 12 June 1981) is a Swiss former professional footballer who played as a football defender in the Swiss Super League for FC Vaduz. He later played for FC Wil.

On 15 February 2024, he was appointed assistant coach at FC Vaduz to head coach Marc Schneider, whom he had worked under at SK Beveren.
