= David Casasnovas =

Spanish footballer (born 1979)

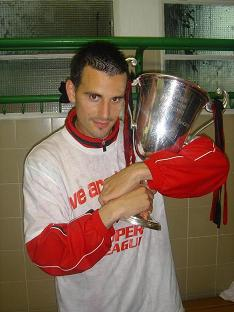

Personal information
- Full name: David Casasnovas Blanco "Casas"
- Date of birth: December 22, 1979 (age 46)
- Place of birth: La Chaux-de-Fonds, Switzerland
- Height: 1.87 m (6 ft 2 in)
- Position: Midfielder

Senior career*
| Years | Team | Apps | (Gls) |
| 1999–2001 | FC Solothurn | 34 | (9) |
| 2001–2003 | SR Delémont | 95 | (22) |
| 2004–2005 | Celta Vigo | 9 | (1) |
| 2005–2006 | FC La Chaux-de-Fonds | 95 | (22) |
| 2006–2007 | Neuchâtel Xamax | 20 | (4) |
| 2008–2010 | FC Biel-Bienne | 61 | (14) |
| 2010-2011 | SR Delémont | 5 | (5) |
- * Club domestic league appearances and goals ‡ National team caps and goals as of July 18, 2009

David Casasnovas is a former Spanish professional football player.

== Career ==
"Casas" spent his career in Switzerland and Spain. He won the Challenge League championship and promotion to Swiss Super League with SR Delémont in 2002 and Neuchâtel Xamax in 2007.

In his career he played 319 games and scored 72 times in the Swiss Super League, Swiss Challenge League and Spanish La Liga.
