= Guido (footballer) =

Brazilian footballer (born 1976)

Personal information
- Full name: Guido Alves Pereira Neto
- Date of birth: 9 March 1976 (age 50)
- Place of birth: Ribeirão Preto, SP, Brazil
- Height: 1.72 m (5 ft 8 in)
- Position: Midfielder

Youth career
- 1990–96: São Paulo

Senior career*
Years	Team	Apps	(Gls)
1997	MetroStars	9	(0)
1998–99	Shanghai Shenhua	?	(?)
2000–03	St. Gallen	88	(8)
- * Club domestic league appearances and goals

Guido Alves Pereira Neto (born March 9, 1976) is a Brazilian retired professional association football player.

== Playing career ==
Guido signed with MetroStars in 1997. He had trouble acclimating to the American lifestyle while living in Newark's Ironbound district.

== Statistics ==
Club performance			League		Cup		League Cup		Continental		Total	
Season	Club	League	Apps	Goals	Apps	Goals	Apps	Goals	Apps	Goals	Apps	Goals
USA			League		Open Cup		League Cup		North America		Total	
1997	MetroStars	MLS	9	0	0	0	0	0	0	0	9	0
Career total			0	0	0	0	0	0	0	0	0	0
