= 2003–04 FC Zürich season =

FC Zürich
2003–04 season
- Owner: FCZ AG
- Club president: Sven Hotz
- Head-coach: Lucien Favre
- Ground: Letzigrund
- 2003–04 Swiss Super League: 4th of 10
- 2003–04 Swiss Cup: Semi-final
- Top goalscorer: League: Artur Petrosyan (13); All: Artur Petrosyan (17)

The 2003–04 season was FC Zürich's 107th season in their existence, since their foundation in 1896. It was their fourteenth consecutive season in the top flight of Swiss football, following their promotion at the end of the 1989–90 season.

== Overview ==
In 1971, under the presidency of Edy Naegeli, FC Zürich established an operating company named FCZ AG, with an initial capital of one million Swiss francs. In doing so, the club broke into new grounds and became the first Swiss club to be run by a holding company. The operating company FCZ AG is responsible for all sporting activities, ranging from professional football to the "LetziKids" youth program and the FCZ women’s teams. The local businessman and property dealer Sven Hotz was the principal owner (majority shareholder) at this time. Hotz was the club's chairman and had taken over as club president at the AGM in 1986. The contract with last season's head-coach Georges Bregy had been terminated during the season and his assistant coach Walter Grüter had ended the season in charge. Hotz and Dr. Urs Scherrer, then vice-president of FCZ, appointed Lucien Favre as new head-coach. As he was hired, he managed to edge out fellow candidate Joachim Löw, as sports journalist Michael Jahn revealed in his biography of Favre. Both men had their job interviews on the same day. Favre had been manager of Servette the previous two seasons.

FCZ played their home games in the Letzigrund, a stadium also used by the athletics club LC Zürich. The stadium originally opened in 1925, was partially rebuilt in 1973 and was modernised during the mid-90's. The stadium is located in the west of Zurich in the district of Altstetten, which is about three kilometers from the city center.

The FCZ first team competed in this years reformed domestic first-tier 2003–04 Swiss Super League with the clear intention of retaining their top level status and reaching one of the top three positions and so qualify for a UEFA European competition. The team also competed in 2003–04 Swiss Cup. The team had not qualified for any of the UEFA European tournaments and they did enter the 2003 UEFA Intertoto Cup.

== Players ==
The following is the list of the FCZ first team squad this season. It also includes players that were in the squad the day the domestic league season started, on 16 July 2003, but subsequently left the club after that date.

Note: Flags indicate national team as defined under FIFA eligibility rules; some limited exceptions apply. Players may hold more than one non-FIFA nationality.

No.	Pos.	Nation	Player
—	GK	SUI	Davide Taini (league games: 35)
—	GK	SUI	Johnny Leoni (league games: 1)
—	DF	SUI	Remo Buess (league games: 6)
—	DF	MAR	Tariq Chihab (league games: 31)
—	DF	ROU	Iulian Filipescu (league games: 13)
—	DF	SUI	Ivan Dal Santo (league games: 29)
—	DF	SUI	Stephan Keller (league games: 17)
—	DF	SUI	Alain Nef (league games: 31)
—	DF	CRO	Stipe Matić (league games: 22)
—	DF	SUI	David Pallas (league games: 15)
—	MF	SUI	Almen Abdi (league games: 12)
—	MF	ARG	Sergio Bastida (league games: 12)
—	MF	BRA	César (league games: 10)
—	MF	SUI	Francesco Di Jorio (league games: 10)

No.	Pos.	Nation	Player
—	MF	SUI	Blerim Džemaili (league games: 30)
—	MF	SUI	Daniel Gygax (league games: 28)
—	MF	ITA	Luca Iodice (league games: 10)
—	MF	ARM	Artur Petrosyan (league games: 33)
—	MF	SUI	Maxime Sanou (league games: 6)
—	MF	SUI	Marc Schneider (league games: 14)
—	MF	CAM	Augustine Simo (league games: 22)
—	MF	SUI	Daniel Tarone (league games: 23)
—	FW	TUR	Mahir Cayir (league games: 1)
—	FW	ARG	Francisco Guerrero (league games: 9)
—	FW	GUI	Alhassane Keita (league games: 28)
—	FW	SUI	André Muff (league games: 17)
—	FW	SUI	Krešimir Stanić (league games: 20)
—	FW	SUI	Ursal Yasar (league games: 11)

Players who joined the squad

The following is the list of players that joined the FCZ first team squad in the off or pre-season or during the winter-break transfer window. It also includes players that advanced from the youth team during the season and achieved at least one domestic league appearance.

Note: Flags indicate national team as defined under FIFA eligibility rules; some limited exceptions apply. Players may hold more than one non-FIFA nationality.

No.	Pos.	Nation	Player
—	MF	SUI	Almen Abdi (from youth team)
—	DF	SUI	Remo Buess (from Xamax)
—	MF	BRA	César (from Portuguesa)
—	MF	SUI	Blerim Džemaili (from youth team)
—	DF	ROU	Iulian Filipescu (from Betis)

No.	Pos.	Nation	Player
—	DF	CRO	Stipe Matić (from Posušje)
—	FW	SUI	André Muff (on loan from Basel)
—	MF	ARM	Artur Petrosyan (from Young Boys)
—	MF	SUI	Maxime Sanou (on loan from Servette)
—	MF	CAM	Augustine Simo (from Xamax)

Players who left the squad

The following is the list of the FCZ first team players that left the squad, either during the previous season or in the off-season, before the new domestic season began.

Note: Flags indicate national team as defined under FIFA eligibility rules; some limited exceptions apply. Players may hold more than one non-FIFA nationality.

No.	Pos.	Nation	Player
—	GK	SVK	Miroslav König (to Elazığspor)
—	DF	SUI	Urs Fischer (retired)
—	DF	NED	Wilco Hellinga (to Veendam)
—	DF	SUI	Sébastien Jeanneret (retired)
—	DF	SUI	Yvan Quentin (to Sion)
—	MF	CIV	Kanga Akalé (to Auxerre)

No.	Pos.	Nation	Player
—	MF	SUI	Adnan Jashari (to Winterthur)
—	MF	SUI	Mario Raimondi (return to Thun after loan)
—	FW	BRA	Jefferson Batista (to Vitória Bahía)
—	FW	NIG	Lucky Isibor (contract dissolved)
—	MF	SUI	Vural Oenen (to FC Altstetten (Zürich))

== Results ==
Legend

Win Draw Loss Postponed

=== Super League ===
==== First half of season ====
In the newly reformed Swiss Super League, this season was contested by ten teams. The season was competed in four round-robins, two before the winter-break and two further rounds after the break. The league season began on 16 July 2003 and was completed on 23 May 2004.

16 July 2003 Round 1	Basel	2–1	Zürich	St. Jakob-Park, Basel
19:30	H. Yakin 33' (1:0); Esposito (yellow card) 42'; Huggel 86' (2:1)	FCB summary FCZ summary	51' (1:1) Keita; (yellow card) 82' Buess; (yellow card) 85' Gygax	Attendance: 30,561; Referee: (Switzerland) Philippe Leuba (Chexbres)
Note: FCB without Cantaluppi and Streller (both suspended), as well as Murat Yakin and Tum (both injured) and Ergic (long-term illness). FCZ were without Nef, Yasar and Stanic (all injured), as well as Dal Santo (ineligible to play). League-debut für FCZ players Almen Abdi and Blerim Džemaili. 300th Swiss top-tier game for FCB goalie Pascal Zuberbühler.

19 July 2003 Round 2	Zürich	0–1	Servette	Letzigrund, Zürich
19:30	Chihab (yellow card) 16'	FCZ summary	(yellow card) 11' Vardanyan; (yellow card) 31' (yellow-red card) 81' Hilton; 41' (0:1) Obradović	Attendance: 6,800; Referee: (Switzerland) Nicole Petignat (Courgenay)
Note: 25th minute, Servette defender Jaquet substituted out injured. 37th minute, FCZ striker Yasar substituted out injured. After the match, Urs Fischer was bid farewell by the Südkurve.

26 July 2003 Round 3	Young Boys	2–1	Zürich	Stadion Neufeld, Bern
19:30	Chapuisat 47' (1:0); Leandro 63' (2:0); Eugster (yellow card) 90+1'	FCZ summary	(yellow card) 65' Gygax; 80' (2:1) Petrosyan	Attendance: 8,000; Referee: (Switzerland) Reto Rutz (Amriswil)
Note: The Young Boys played their home games in the Stadion Neufeld after the Wankdorf Stadium was demolished in 2001 and the new Stadion Wankdorf was constructed on the same site. FCZ without Yasar (injured).

2 August 2003 Round 4	Zürich	2–2	St. Gallen	Letzigrund, Zürich
19:30	Tarone (yellow card) 41'; Keller (yellow card) 58'; Petrosyan 63' (1:1); Bastida (yellow card) 73'; Džemaili (red card) 78'; Petrosyan 79' (2:2)	FCZ summary	11' (0:1) Tachie-Mensah; (yellow card) 29' Zellweger; 78' (pen.) Tachie-Mensah; (yellow card) 79' Marazzi; (yellow card) 89' Balmer; (yellow card) 90+3' Pavlović	Attendance: 7,400; Referee: (Switzerland) Guido Wildhaber (Kerzers)
Note: FCZ without Yasar (injured).

8 August 2003 Round 5	Xamax	2–1	Zürich	Stade de la Maladière, Neuchâtel
19:30	Rey 4' (1:0); Mangane (yellow card) 14'; Rey 52' (2:0)	FCZ summary	(yellow card) 56' Nef; (yellow card) 58' Guerrero; 90+3' (2:1) Chihab	Attendance: 8,200; Referee: (Austria) Richard Kern
Note: This match was played as part of the interaction referee exchange between the Swiss Football Association and the Austrian Football Association. FCZ without Yasar (injured).

17 August 2003 Round 6	Grasshopper Club	1–0	Zürich	Hardturm, Zürich
16:15	Chatruc (yellow card) 42'; Núñez 64' (1:0); Núñez (yellow card) 87'	FCZ summary		Attendance: 13,600; Referee: (Switzerland) Martin Salm (Veltheim, Aargau)
Note: FCZ without Yasar (injured).

23 August 2003 Round 7	Zürich	3–1	Wil	Letzigrund, Zürich
19:30	Petrosyan 48' (1:0); Keita 73' (2:1); Dal Santo (yellow card) 84'; Petrosyan 85' (3:1)	FCZ summary	52' (1:1) Rogério; (yellow card) 67' Renggli; (yellow card) 89' Mangiarratti	Attendance: 4,300; Referee: (Switzerland) Florian Etter

30 August 2003 Round 8	Aarau	3–3	Zürich	Stadion Brügglifeld, Aarau
19:30	Keller (yellow card) 6'; Bieli 11' (1:0) de Napoli 44' (2:2) de Napoli 62' (3:3); Gaspoz (yellow card) 73'	FCZ summary FCA summary	28' (o.g.) (Vanetta); 33' (1:2) Gygax; 53' (2:3) Nef; (yellow card) 87' Keita	Attendance: 5,100; Referee: (Switzerland) Massimo Busacca (Monte Carasso/Bellinzona)

7 September 2003 Round 9	Zürich	4–0	Thun	Letzigrund, Zürich
19:30	Petrosyan 6' (1:0); Simo (yellow card) 20'; Petrosyan (yellow card) 36'; Chihab 46' (2:0); Bastida 72' (3:0); Keller 85' (4:0); Dal Santo (yellow card) 89'	FCZ summary		Attendance: 3,800; Referee: (Switzerland) Reto Rutz (Amriswil)
Note: FCZ without Yasar, Abdi (both injured).

14 September 2003 Round 10	Zürich	0–1	Basel	Letzigrund, Zürich
16:15	Petrosyan (yellow card) 77'; Gygax (yellow card) 80'	FCB summary FCZ summary	4' (0:1) Rossi; (yellow card) 32' (yellow-red card) 80' Chipperfield; (yellow card) 43' Smiljanić	Attendance: 18,200; Referee: (Liechtenstein) Roland Beck (Triesenberg)
Note: FCZ without Yasar, Abdi (both injured), and Muff (suspended). FCB without Atouba, Duruz and Esposito (all injured), as well as Hakan Yakin (recovering from injury; he played for the U-21 team) and without Ergic (long-term illness). Stipe Matić made his debut for FCZ. 40th minute, FCB goalkeeper Zuberbühler tipped a header from Keita against the crossbar and out for a corner.

28 September 2003 Round 11	Servette	3–1	Zürich	Stade de Genève, Lancy
16:15	Hilton 18' (1:0); Bah 66' (2:1); Hilton (yellow card) 67'; Zambrella 83' (3:1)	FCZ summary	31' (1:1) Muff; (yellow card) 51' Keita; (yellow card) 67' Keller; (yellow card) 90' Tarone	Attendance: 7,590; Referee: (Switzerland) Claudio Circhetta (Muttenz)

2 October 2003 Round 12	Zürich	P–P	Young Boys	Letzigrund, Zürich
19:30		[ FCZ summary]

5 October 2003 Round 13	St. Gallen	2–1	Zürich	Espenmoos, St. Gallen
16:15	Tachie-Mensah 46' (1:0); Wolf (yellow card) 65'; Merenda 77' (2:1); Razzetti (yellow card) 90+2'	FCZ summary	(yellow card) 34' Bastida; (yellow card) 41' Chihab; 66' (1:1) Bastida; (yellow card) 77' Keller	Attendance: 7,800; Referee: (Switzerland) Florian Etter

13 October 2003 Round 12	Zürich	0–2	Young Boys	Letzigrund, Zürich
19:30	Simo (yellow card) 45'; Bastida (yellow card) 84'; Matić (yellow card) 85'	FCZ summary	(yellow card) 82' Eugster; 86' (0:1) Leandro; 87' (0:2) Chapuisat	Attendance: 5,900; Referee: (Switzerland) Martin Salm (Veltheim, Aargau)
Note: The match was originally scheduled for 2 October, but after postponement was rescheduled.

26 October 2003 Round 14	Zürich	3–1	Xamax	Letzigrund, Zürich
16:15	Keita 34' (1:0); Iodice 72' (2:0); Chihab 90' (3:1)	FCZ summary	(yellow card) 39' Portillo; 85' (2:1) Ojong	Attendance: 5,400; Referee: (Switzerland) Markus Nobs (Wohlen bei Bern)
Note: 45th minute, Xamax midfielder Mangane left the game injured.

29 October 2003 Round 15	Zürich	0–2	Grasshopper Club	Letzigrund, Zürich
19:30	Iodice (yellow card) 33'; Taini (yellow card) 49'; Keller (yellow card) 62'	FCZ summary	(yellow card) 34' Schwegler; (yellow card) 42' Lichtsteiner; 45' (0:1) Petrić; 50' (pen.) Núñez; (yellow card) 79' Opabunmi	Attendance: 10,400; Referee: (Switzerland) Massimo Busacca (Monte Carasso/Bellinzona)
Note: 7th minute, FCZ player Džemaili was substituted out injured.

2 November 2003 Round 16	Wil	2–1	Zürich	Stadion Bergholz, Wil
16:15	Pires (yellow card) 63'; Pires 86' (1:1); Mordeku 87' (2:1)	FCZ summary	43' (0:1) Matić; (yellow card) 45' Muff; (yellow card) 63' Nef; (yellow card) 75' Keller	Attendance: 3,400; Referee: (Switzerland) Reto Rutz (Amriswil)

23 November 2003 Round 17	Zürich	4–2	Aarau	Letzigrund, Zürich
16:15	Petrosyan 4' (1:0); Petrosyan (yellow card) 45'; Matić 56' (2:2); Nef 68' (3:2); Keita (yellow card) 67'; Nef (yellow card) 73'; Muff 90+2' (4:2)	FCZ summary FCA summary	(yellow card) 11' Vanetta; 32' (1:1) Varela; 43' (1:2) Varela; (yellow card) 60' (yellow-red card) 69' Varela	Attendance: 4,700; Referee: (Switzerland) Florian Etter

30 November2003 Round 18	Thun	2–0	Zürich	Stadion Lachen, Thun
16:15	Buess (yellow card) 61'; Zanni 71' (1:0); Carlos 88' (2:0)	FCZ summary		Attendance: 3,550; Referee: (Switzerland) Nicole Petignat (Courgenay)

==== Second half of season ====
The second half of the season started on 15 February 2004 and was completed on 22 May.

15 February 2004 Round 19	Aarau	2–4	Zürich	Stadion Brügglifeld, Aarau
14:30	Opango 1' (1:0); Opango (yellow card) 24'; Varela (yellow card) 42'; Christ (yellow card) 56'; Vanetta (yellow card) 63'; Paulinho 85' (2:3); Gaspoz (yellow card) 88'	FCZ summary FCA summary	8' (1:1) Muff; (yellow card) 39' Schneider; (yellow card) 43' Nef; 11' (1:2) Petrosyan; 54' (1:3) Muff; 90+3' (2:4) Džemaili	Attendance: 5,400; Referee: (Switzerland) Massimo Busacca (Monte Carasso/Bellinzona)
Note: First top-tier goal for Blerim Džemai.

22 February 2004 Round 20	Zürich	2–0	Servette	Letzigrund, Zürich
14:30	Di Jorio 9' (1:0); Gygax 66' (2:0); Filipescu (yellow card) 80'	FCZ summary	(yellow card) 3' Jaquet; (yellow card) 59' Aziawonou; (yellow card) 75' Kader	Attendance: 6,300; Referee: (Switzerland) Guido Wildhaber (Kerzers)

29 February 2004 Round 21	Young Boys	2–2	Zürich	Stadion Neufeld, Bern
14:30	Häberli 24' (1:0); Melunovic (yellow card) 72'; Disler 82' (2:1)	FCZ summary	(yellow card) 27' Nef; (yellow card) 42' Di Jorio; 48' (1:1) Džemaili; (yellow card) 52' Džemaili; (yellow card) 81' Filipescu; 90+1' Petrosyan	Attendance: 6,900; Referee: (Switzerland) Reto Rutz (Amriswil)
Note: The Young Boys played their home games in the Stadion Neufeld after the Wankdorf Stadium was demolished in 2001 and the new Stadion Wankdorf was constructed on the same site.

7 March 2004 Round 22	Zürich	2–1	Wil	Letzigrund, Zürich
14:30	Gygax 42' (1:0); Stanić 78' (2:1)	FCZ summary	(yellow card) 51' Nushi; 59' (1:1) Rogério; (yellow card) 87' Rogério	Attendance: 5,100; Referee: (Switzerland) Markus Nobs (Wohlen bei Bern)

14 March 2004 Round 23	Grasshopper Club	1–2	Zürich	Hardturm, Zürich
16:15	Eduardo (yellow card) 28'; Nuñez 37' (1:0); Lichtsteiner (yellow card) 75'	FCZ summary	44' (1:1) Chihab; (yellow card) 44' Chihab; 47' (1:2) Di Jorio; (red card) 75' Di Jorio; (yellow card) 81' Schneider; (yellow card) 86' Filipescu	Attendance: 10,900; Referee: (Switzerland) Martin Salm (Veltheim, Aargau)

17 March 2004 Round 24	Zürich	1–0	Basel	Letzigrund, Zürich
19:30	Gygax 7' (1:0); Chihab (yellow card) 11'; Dal Santo (yellow card) 58'; Taini (yellow card) 87'; Petrosyan (yellow card) 90+2'	FCB summary FCZ summary	(yellow card) 13' Delgado; (yellow card) 67' Chipperfield; (yellow card) 90+1' Smiljanić	Attendance: 16,200; Referee: (Switzerland) Nicole Petignat (Courgenay)
Note: FCZ without Di Jorio and Schneider (both suspended), Bastida and Buess (both injured). FCB without Murat Yakin and Rapo (both injured) and Ergic (recovering from longterm illness). FCB suffered their first league defeat, after an unbeaten run of 29 games, over two seasons.

21 March 2004 Round 25	St. Gallen	1–3	Zürich	Espenmoos, St. Gallen
16:15	Tachie-Mensah (yellow card) 15'; Ekubo (yellow card) 26'; Merenda 72' (1:1); Lazaroni (yellow card) 79' (yellow-red card) 90+1'	FCZ summary	27' (0:1) Muff; (yellow card) 33' Nef; (yellow card) 86' Filipescu; 88' (1:2) Gygax; 90+2' (1:3) Muff	Attendance: 8,300; Referee: (Austria) Thomas Einwaller
Note: This match was played as part of the interaction referee exchange between the Swiss Football Association and the Austrian Football Association. 5th minute, FCZ defender Matić was substitued out injured.

28 March 2004 Round 26	Zürich	1–0	Xamax	Letzigrund, Zürich
14:30	César (yellow card) 33'; Nef (yellow card) 42'; Džemaili (yellow card) 61'; Muff 89' (1:0)	FCZ summary	(yellow card) 32' M'Futi	Attendance: 5,800; Referee: (Switzerland) Jérôme Laperrière (Kerzers)
Note: 5th minute, FCZ midfielder Di Jorio was substituted out injured.

4 April 2004 Round 27	Thun	2–1	Zürich	Stadion Lachen, Thun
14:30	Gerber (yellow card) 18'; Hodžić 28' (1:0); Baykal (yellow card) 63'; Carlos 76' (2:0); Coltorti (yellow card) 81'	FCZ summary	(yellow card) 45' Matić; 82' (pen.) Petrosyan; (yellow card) 90+3' Muff	Attendance: 3,800; Referee: (Switzerland) Claudio Circhetta (Muttenz)

8 April 2004 Round 28	Zürich	0–0	Thun	Letzigrund, Zürich
19:30	Dal Santo (yellow card) 71'	FCZ summary	(yellow card) 34' Hodžić; (yellow card) 71' (yellow-red card) 83' Aegerter; (yellow card) 89' Baykal	Attendance: 5,400; Referee: (Switzerland) Martin Salm (Veltheim, Aargau)
Note: 78th minute FCZ striker Stanić substituted out injured.

15 April 2004 Round 29	Xamax	4–2	Zürich	Stade de la Maladière, Neuchâtel
19:30	Oppliger (yellow card) 12'; Griffiths (yellow card) 18'; M'Futi 21' (1:1); Forschelet 34' (2:1); Rey 65' (3:2); Barea (yellow card) 67'; M'Futi 86' (4:2)	FCZ summary	19' (1:0) Petrosyan; (yellow card) 22' Petrosyan; 46' (2:2) Muff; (yellow card) 64' Muff; (red card) 78' Keita	Attendance: 5,000; Referee: (Switzerland) Carlo Bertolini (Vira-Gambarogno)

18 April 2004 Round 30	Zürich	2–2	St. Gallen	Letzigrund, Zürich
14:30	Schneider (yellow card) 27'; Yasar 59' (1:2); Schneider 87' (2:2); Chihab (yellow card) 90+2'	FCZ summary	21' (0:1) Merenda; 45' (0:2) Barnetta; (yellow card) 53' Marić; (yellow card) 66' Jenny; (yellow card) 88' Zellweger	Attendance: 7,200; Referee: (Switzerland) Massimo Busacca (Monte Carasso/Bellinzona)
Note: FCZ without Keita (suspended). 44th minute, FCSG midfielder Bruno Sutter substituted out injured.

24 April 2004 Round 31	Basel	1–1	Zürich	St. Jakob-Park, Basel
16:00	Smiljanić 27' (1:1); D. Degen (yellow card) 60'	FCB summary FCZ summary	(yellow card) 13' Gygax; 22' (0:1) Petrosyan; (yellow card) 38' Filipescu; (yellow card) 45' Matić; (yellow card) 78' Nef; (yellow card) 90+2' Taini	Attendance: 27,842 (sold out); Referee: (Switzerland) René Rogalla (Wallisellen)
Note: Admission tickets were only available in advance, no ticket sales on entry. FCB without Ergic (recovering), as well as Rapo, Quennoz and Murat Yakin (all injured). FCZ without Abdi, Buess, Bastida and Stanic (all injured), and Keita (suspended). 15th minute: FCB goalkeeper Zuberbühler deflected a shot from Gygax onto the post. 30th minute, FCZ midfielder Muff left the pitch due to groin trouble.

2 May 2004 Round 32	Zürich	0–0	Grasshopper Club	Letzigrund, Zürich
16:15	Dal Santo (yellow card) 35'; Schneider (yellow card) 68'	FCZ summary	(yellow card) 21' Núñez; (yellow card) 24' Cabanas; (yellow card) 69' Gane; (yellow card) 70' Lichtsteiner	Attendance: 18,400; Referee: (Switzerland) Urs Meier (Wettingen and Würenlos)

8 May 2004 Round 33	Wil	0–1	Zürich	Stadion Bergholz, Wil
19:30	Rogério (yellow card) 10'	FCZ summary	(yellow card) 34' Pallas; 61' (0:1) Yasar	Attendance: 2,800; Referee: (Switzerland) Jérôme Laperrière (Kerzers)

12 May 2004 Round 34	Zürich	2–2	Young Boys	Letzigrund, Zürich
19:30	Filipescu (yellow card) 27'; Keita 40' (1:2); Džemaili (yellow card) 65'; Tarone 88' (2:2)	FCZ summary	29' (0:1) Leandro; 33' (0:2) Leandro; (yellow card) 58' Chapuisat; (yellow card) 25' (yellow-red card) 66' Coubageat	Attendance: 5,800; Referee: (Switzerland) Martin Salm (Veltheim, Aargau)

15 May 2004 Round 35	Servette	2–3	Zürich	Stade de Genève, Lancy
19:30	Vardanyan (yellow card) 16'; Thurre 49' (1:1); Thurre (yellow card) 49' (Chihab) 89' (o.g.); Bah (yellow card) 58' (yellow-red card) 90+3'	FCZ summary	8' (0:1) Yasar; (yellow card) 34' Pallas; (yellow card) 56' Džemaili; 60' (1:2) Nef; 68' (1:3) Gygax	Attendance: 8,652; Referee: (Switzerland) Cyril Zimmermann (Bolligen)

23 May 2004 Round 36	Zürich	4–1	Aarau	Letzigrund, Zürich
16:15	Yasar 10' (1:0); Di Jorio 59' (2:1); Nef (yellow card) 62'; Petrosyan 68' (3:1); Matić 71' (4:1)	FCZ summary	23' (1:1) Kavelashvili; (yellow card) 64' Vanetta	Attendance: 4,900; Referee: (Switzerland) Florian Etter

==== Final league table ====
Pos	Team	Pld	W	D	L	GF	GA	GD	Pts	Qualification or relegation
1	Basel	36	26	7	3	86	32	+54	85	Swiss champions qualification to Champions League third qualifying round
2	Young Boys	36	22	6	8	75	48	+27	72	qualification to Champions League second qualifying round
3	Servette	36	15	7	14	61	62	−1	52	qualification to UEFA Cup second qualifying round
4	Zürich	36	14	8	14	58	52	+6	50	
5	St. Gallen	36	14	8	14	54	57	−3	50	
6	Thun	36	13	10	13	51	57	−6	49	entered Intertoto Cup first round
7	Grasshopper	36	12	5	19	62	74	−12	41	
8	Aarau	36	9	11	16	57	69	−12	38	
9	Xamax	36	10	6	20	46	63	−17	36	qualification to relegation play-off
10	Wil	36	7	8	21	37	73	−36	29	relegated to Swiss Challenge League; Swiss Cup winners qualification to UEFA Cup second qualifying round

Source: RSSSF
Rules for classification: 1) points; 2) goal difference; 3) number of goals scored.

=== Swiss Cup ===
The first round of this season's cup competition started on the 19th and 20th September. The first-tier teams were seeded and cound not be drawn against each other. The draw respected regionalities, when possible, and the lower classed team was granted home advantage.

20 September 2003 Round 1	FC Wiesendangen	0–6	Zürich	Sportplatz Rietsamen, Wiesendangen
16:15		FCZ summary	16' (0:1) Petrosyan; 21' (0:2) Guerrero; 43' (0:3) Keita; 50' (0:4) Keita; 55' (0:5) Chihab; 60' (0:6) Gygax	Attendance: 3,000; Referee: (Switzerland) Urs Meier (Wettingen and Würenlos)
Note: FC Wiesendangen played the 2003/04 season in the 2. Liga regional (fifth-tier). FCZ without Bastida and Yasar (both injured), as well as Buess and Muff (both suspended). 48th minute, FCW goalkeeper Cédric Peter was substituted out injured. 60th minute, FCZ midfielder Gygax left the pitch due to an injury, leaving FCZ with only nine outfield players. 83rd minute, a shotfrom Petrosyan hit the crossbar; 85th minute, a shot from Chihab hit the post.

18 October 2003 Round 2	Wangen bei Olten	0–1	Zürich	Sportplatz Chrüzmatt
16:15	Dias (yellow card) 62'	FCZ summary	36' (0:1) Petrosyan; (yellow card) 86' Bastida	Attendance: 2,200; Referee: (Switzerland) Massimo Busacca (Monte Carasso/Bellinzona)
Note: FC Wangen bei Olten played the 2003/04 season in the 1. Liga (third-tier).

9 November 2003 Round 3	Herisau	2–4	Zürich	Ebnet, Herisau
14:30	Knaus (yellow card) 33'; Gambino (yellow card) 37'; Barrasa 54' (1:3); Lapcevic 85' (2:5)	FCZ summary	16' (o.g.) (Cipriano); 35' (0:2) Guerrero; 38' (0:3) Iodice; (yellow card) 43' Simo; (yellow card) 68' Matić; 77' (1:4) Chihab; (yellow card) 85' Buess	Attendance: 3,000; Referee: (Switzerland) Daniel Wermelinger (Aarau)
Note: FC Herisau played the 2003/04 season in the 2. Liga Interregional (fourth-tier).

7 December 2003 Quarter-final	Meyrin	0–3	Zürich	Stade du Bois-Carré, Meyrin
14:30	Yoksuzoglu (yellow card) 16'; Girod (yellow card) 63'; Brunner (yellow card) 74'	FCZ summary	10' (0:1) Guerrero; 23' (0:2) Petrosyan; (yellow card) 53' Muff; (yellow card) 55' Petrosyan; (yellow card) 66' Nef; 70' (0:3) Petrosyan	Attendance: 2,550; Referee: (Switzerland) Claudio Circhetta (Muttenz)
Note: FC Meyrin played the 2003/04 season in the Challenge League (second-tier).

3 March 2004 Semi-final	Grasshopper Club	6–5 (a.e.t.)	Zürich	Hardturm, Zürich
20:15	Petrić 37' (1:2); Cabanas (yellow card) 45'; Eduardo 57' (2:3); Eduardo 83' (3:5); Eduardo 89' (3:5); Petrić 90+2' (5:5); Núñez 95' (6:5)	FCZ summary	6' (0:1) Gygax; 11' (o.g.) (Ziegler); (yellow card) 19' César; 44' (1:3) Gygax; 61' (2:4) Gygax; 63' (2:5) César; (yellow card) (yellow-red card) 63' César; (yellow card) 112' Chihab; (yellow card) 117' Gygax	Attendance: 11,200; Referee: (Switzerland) Urs Meier (Wettingen and Würenlos)

GC continued to the final, which was played at the St. Jakob-Park in Basel. However, in the final they were beaten 3–2 by FC Wil and they qualified themselves for the UEFA Cup second qualifying round.

=== Friendly matches ===
==== Pre-season ====
21 June 2003 Exhibition game	Zürich	3–2	Bellinzona	Sportplatz Schürwies, Egg, Switzerland
	Cayir 10' (1:0); Gasche 77'; Gasche 79'	FCZ summary	Goal	Attendance: 478; Referee: (Switzerland) Martin Salm (Veltheim, Aargau)
Note: FCZ with various youth team players.

26 June 2003 Exhibition game	FC Concordia Basel	2–2	Zürich	Stadion Rankhof, Basel
	Tchouga 77' (1:1); Traoré 87' (2:2)	FCZ summary	25' (0:1) Stanić; 84' (1:2) Keller	Attendance: 200; Referee: (Switzerland) Markus Von Känel
Note: Both teams with various youth team and test players.

28 June 2003 Exhibition game	Zürich	5–0	Kriens	Sportanlage Werd, Geroldswil
	Keita (1:0); Keita (2:0); Iodice (3:0); Stanić (4:0); Stanić (5:0)	FCZ summary

2 July 2003 Exhibition game	Zürich	0–1	St. Gallen	Letzigrund, Zürich
		FCZ summary	29' (0:1) Pavlović	Attendance: 1,500; Referee: Sportplatz Kett, Sirnach

6 July 2003 Exhibition game	Zürich	1–2	Kaiserslautern	Beichlen, Wädenswil
	Guerrero 25' (1:0)	FCZ summary	33' (1:1) Lokvenc; 48' (1:2) Timm	Attendance: 2,500; Referee: (Switzerland) Martin Salm (Veltheim, Aargau)
Note: Exhibition game as part of the 100th anniversary of FC Wädenswil.

9 July 2003 Exhibition game	Oberland selection	0–6	Zürich	Sportanlage Buchholz, Uster
		FCZ summary	(1:0) Keita (2:0) Keita (3:0) Keita (4:0) Keita (5:0) Keita (6:0) Petrosyan
Note: Game played as part of the 1st cantonal 3-Cities Tournament. Playing time 45 minutes. Opponents were a regional Zürcher-Oberland selection of 2. Liga players.

9 July 2003 Exhibition game	Zürich	2–1	Winterthur	Sportanlage Buchholz, Uster
	Simo; Guerrero	FCZ summary	Goal
Note: Game played as part of the 1st cantonal 3-Cities Tournament. Playing time 45 minutes.

10 July 2003 Exhibition game	Wohlen	1–8	Zürich	Paul-Walser-Stiftung, Wohlen
	80' (1:8)	FCZ summary	7' (0:1) Petrosyan; 19' (0:2) Muff; 22' (0:3) Petrosyan; 28' (0:4) Muff; 59' (pen.) Tarone; 62' (0:6) Muff; 65' (0:7) Muff; 73' (0:8) Cayir

30 July 2003 Mid-season	FC Oerlikon	1–4	Zürich	Sportanlage Neudorf, Oerlikon
	46' (1:1)	FCZ summary	10' (0:1) Keita; 58' (1:2) Cayir; 59' (1:3) Tarone; 61' (1:4) Lattmann	Referee: (Switzerland) Nicole Petignat (Courgenay)
Note: FCZ with various youth team players and with nine substitutions at half time.

9 September 2003 Mid-season	Zürich	7–2	FC Wülflingen	Trainings pitch, Letzigrund, Zürich
	Guerrero 13' (1:0); Muff 19' (2:0); Guerrero 30' (3:0); Muff 57'; Tarone 63'; Guerrero 73'; Yasar 86'	FCZ summary	Goal

18 November 2003 Mid-season	FC Regensdorf	1–5	Zürich	Sportplatz Wisacher, Regensdorf
	50' (1:3)	FCZ summary	(yellow card) 26' Keller; 36' (0:1) Tarone; 46' (0:2) Stanić; 47' (0:3) Stanić; 74' (1:4) Keita; 88' (1:5) Abdi	Referee: (Switzerland) Hug

==== Winter break ====
18 January 2004 Exhibition game	Zürich	1–1	SpVgg Greuther Fürth
	Guerrero	FCZ summary	Goal

22 January 2004 Exhibition game	Real Balompédica Linense	2–2	Zürich	Municipal La Línea, Spain
	Goal	FCZ summary	58' Nef; 88' Muff
Note: Match played as part of the trainings camp in southern Spain. 40th minute, Filipescu left the pitch due to injury.

22 January 2004 Exhibition game	Zürich	1–1	Dynamo Moscow	Estepona, Spain
	Muff 86' (1:1)	FCZ summary	38' (0:1) Labukas
Note: Match played as part of the trainings camp in southern Spain.

8 February 2004 Exhibition game	Zürich	6–0	Schaffhausen	Letzigrund, Zürich
	Dal Santo 26' (1:0); Gygax 32' (2:0); Petrosyan 36' (3:0); Petrosyan 59' (pen.); Petrosyan 71' (5:0); Di Jorio 90' (6:0)	FCZ summary		Attendance: 300; Referee: (Switzerland) René Rogalla (Wallisellen)

11 February 2004 Exhibition game	Baden	0–0	Zürich	Esp Stadium, Fislisbach
		FCZ summary		Attendance: 200; Referee: (Switzerland) Urs Meier (Wettingen and Würenlos)

24 February 2004 Mid-season	Zürich	3–0	YF Juventus	Played on the artificial turf pitch, Letzigrund, Zürich
	Goal	FCZ summary		Attendance: 150

== Sources ==
- dbFCZ Homepage
- Switzerland 2003–04 at RSSSF

Preceded by 2002–03	FC Zürich seasons	Succeeded by 2004–05
