= 2003–04 FC Basel season =

FC Basel
2003–04 season
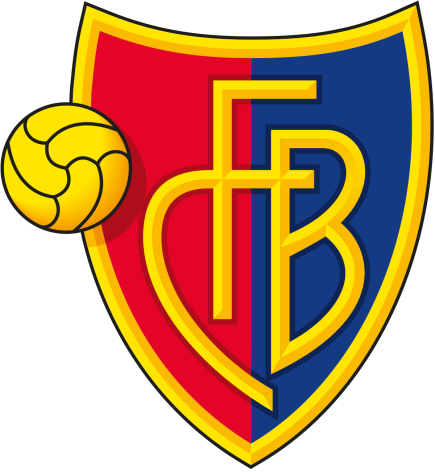
- Club president: Werner Edelmann
- Head coach: Christian Gross
- Stadium: St. Jakob-Park
- Swiss Super League: Champions
- Swiss Cup: Third round
- UEFA Cup: Second round
- Top goalscorer: League: Christian Giménez (16); All: Christian Giménez (16)
- Highest home attendance: 30,800 vs Grasshoppers (23.11.2003)
- Lowest home attendance: 21,803 vs Xamax (28.04.2004)
- Average home league attendance: 29,850

The 2003–04 season was Fussball Club Basel 1893's 111th in existence and the club's 10th consecutive season in the Nationalliga A, the top flight of Swiss football. Basel played their home games in the newly constructed St. Jakob-Park complex. Local businessman Werner Edelmann was the club's chairman for the second consecutive season.

The club's main aims for the 2003–04 season were to regain the league title and, as cup holders, to retain their cup title. The third aim was to remain in the UEFA Cup as long as possible. During pre-season Basel won the Uhrencup and the Alpen Cup. After being the surprise package in Europe in the 2002–03 season, Basel could not bring this form into the UEFA Cup in 2003–04 as they were eliminated by Newcastle United in the second round after defeating Malatyaspor in the previous round.

The Super League season started impeccably, Basel won the first thirteen matches straight off. They completed the first half of the season undefeated, with seventeen wins and one draw. Basel remained in top position right up until the end of the season, thus achieving their championship aim. In the club's history this was their tenth championship title.

== Overview ==
=== Off-season and pre-season ===
Christian Gross was the first team trainer for the fifth successive season. Former Basel youth player David Degen, who had started his professional career with FC Aarau in 2000 returned to the club. Basel's biggest signing in advance of the 2003–04 season was Matías Emilio Delgado from Chacarita Juniors

But in the other direction Bernt Haas returned to West Bromwich Albion after the end of the loan period. Ljubo Miličević returned to Zürich as his loan contract had also ended and Carlos Varela was loaned out to FC Aarau. Further Hakan Yakin left the club and transferred to Paris Saint-Germain. Following the players arrival at the club, PSG manager Vahid Halilhodžić diagnosed him as not fit enough to train with the team and so sent Yakin into individual training. After five/six week of individual training, Halilhodžić hadn't changed his opinion and the contract between club and player was dissolved under mutual consent and Yakin returned to Basel. During the last few matches of the calendar year, he played a few matches for FCB.

FC Basel started the season off with various warm-up matches. These included teams from the Swiss lower league as well as teams from the German Bundesliga, the French Ligue 1 and the Romanian Liga I. The season began on 16 July 2003 with the home game against Zürich.

Despite the fact that Grasshopper Club Zürich were the reigning Swiss champions, Basel were favourites to win the domestic championship title. As runners-up of the previous Nationalliga A season, Basel entered the UEFA Cup in first round. The club's aims for the new season were clear, the league title must be won, the cup title was to be defended and that the team should remain in the 2003–04 UEFA Cup competition, at least two rounds or even better until the winter break.

=== Winter break ===
During the winter break Marco Streller and Hakan Yakin both transferred out to VfB Stuttgart. Basel signed Francisco Gabriel Guerrero for six months on loan from FC Zürich.

== The Campaign ==
=== Domestic League ===
The Swiss Football Association (ASF-SFV) had changed the format of the domestic league. Since the 1987–88 Nationalliga A season there were 24 teams in the Nationalliga, 12 in the Nationalliga A and 12 in the Nationalliga B. In the first stage there was a qualifying phase played as double round-robin. In the second phase the top eight clubs played a further double round-robin for the championship. Last season was last in that format. The new format was called Swiss Super League, or with the sponsor's name Axpo Super League. As of this season, there were ten teams in the top tier and seventeen in the second tier. In the top tier, the teams played a double round-robin in the first half of the season and then another double round-robin in the second half. There were three points for a victory and one each for a draw. The champions and runners-up would enter the qualifying rounds of the 2004–05 Champions League, the third placed team would enter the UEFA Cup second qualifying round. The bottom placed team would be relegated the second last team would play a play-off against relegation.

Basel's priority aim for the season was to win the league championship.

First half of season

The season began on 16 July 2003 with the home game against Zürich in the St. Jakob-Park with 30,561 spectators. Hakan Yakin netted the first goal for FCB on 33 minutes. After the break, against the run of play, on 51 minutes Alhassane Keita scored the equaliser. Basel pressed for the winner and on 86 minutes following a set piece Benjamin Huggel realised it and FCB won 2–1. The second league match was away against Young Boys in sold out Stadion Neufeld in Bern with an attendance of 11,850 fans. Basel went ahead through a goal from Christian Giménez in the 20th minute. YB equalised 7 minutes later, Leandro was the goal scorer. Immediately after the break, on 47 minutes, Joël Magnin put the hosts in front. FCB switched up a gear and forced YB back straight away and one minute late they were rewarded with their equaliser through Marco Streller. Basel dominated and on 75 minutes Antonio Esposito scored the winning 3–2 goal for the visitors. During the match on 16 August in the Stadion Lachen Christian Giménez scored a hattrick as FCB won 4–0 against Thun. In fact, the season started impeccably, Basel won the first thirteen matches straight off, before they lost their first points in the away game against Aarau in the Stadion Brügglifeld with a 2–2 draw. Basel moved to the top of the league table from the first round and held this position without problem.

Despite disappointing results in the Cup and the UEFA Cup in November, the team held motivation high. They completed the first half of the league season undefeated, with seventeen victories and one draw.

Second half of season

Despite an away win in round 19 against Young Boys to the start of the second half of the season, the team was not as steadfast as it had been before the winter break. In round 20 they misplayed a two-goal advantage at home against Grasshopper Club and had to be satisfied with a 2–2 draw. This was followed by a victory against Xamax and then a further two draws. On matchday 24 they were defeated for the first time in the domestic league losing 1–0 in the Letzigrund against Zürich. The team regrouped and Basel remained in top position in the table until the end of the season, thus won the championship.

Conclusion

The team achieved their championship aim. This was the club's tenth championship title in its history. They won the championship with 26 victories and seven draws, the team had suffered just three away defeats, and obtained 85 points. This meant that they were 13 points ahead of second placed Young Boys. Wil were bottom-placed and relegated and Neuchâtel Xamax played the play-out.

The team completed the seasons eighteen home ties undefeated, winning fourteen and drawing four. Their biggest home wins were two 6–0 wins against Servette in the first half of the season and Neuchâtel Xamax after the winter break. Four home games were reported as sold out, the highest attendance being 30,800 spectators on 23 November 2003 in their highest scoring match of the season, a 5–2 win against Grasshopper.

Basel scored 86 goals during their league season, conceding 32. Christian Giménez was the team's top league scorer with 16 goals, Marco Streller second best with 13 and both Benjamin Huggel and Julio Hernán Rossi netted eight times. Scott Chipperfield, Hervé Tum and Murat Yakin each scored seven times.

=== Domestic Cup ===
As cup holders the club's clear aim was to defend the trophy, or in minimum to reach the final, because this would again be played in their home stadium St. Jakob-Park. The format of the cup had also been changed and all league teams now started in the first round. Here they were seeded and could not play against each other. In a match, the home advantage was granted to the team from the lower league, if applicable.

Alle (19 September 2003)

Basel were drawn against lower league team FC Alle, who at that time played in the fourth tier of Swiss football. FCB head coach rotated the team, with captain Murat Yakin and Marco Streller he let two regular starters have a day off and the duo Matías Delgado and David Degen took their place on the bench. In front of over 4,000 spectators Basel started with strength and much tempo into the game. Marco Zwyssig, in the 8th minute, Benjamin Huggel, in the 18th and Julio Hernán Rossi in the 20th put the favourites three goals up and with this advantage they reduced their pressure. The hosts were overwhelmed, but were willing to fight for their dignity and honour and on 37 minutes scored their consolation goal. Basel reacted and within 60 seconds restored the three-goal advantage as Rossi scored his brace. Ten minutes after the break Huggel also achieved a brace with a long-distance shot. Basel controlled the rest of the match and went home with a 5–1 victory.

Urania (19 October 2003)

In the next round FCB were drawn against Urania Genève Sport, who at that time also played in the fourth tier. The run of play in this second-round game was similar to the first-round match. Basel used their tempo to put the lower-class team under pressure. The outcome was very similar, again Marco Zwyssig, this time in the 7th minute, again Julio Hernán Rossi, this time in the 15th minute and Antonio Esposito on 19 minutes put the visitors three goals up. Basel were then content to hold the ball in their possession and to keep play away from their area. Alexandre Quennoz added Basel's fourth just before the interval. In the second period FCB retained the hosts under control and did not allow the amateur team to create dangerous moves. This was successful until the 80th minute, as only a foul in the area could stop the visitor's efforts. Pascal Zuberbühler was equal to the spot-kick and held. However, in the last minute of the game he was beaten and the hosts scored their consolation goal.

Grasshopper Club (9 November 2003)

In the third round Basel were drawn away against the Grasshoppers. The match in the Hardturm was played in front of 13,100 fans. GC played well and took advantage of the fact that FCB had had a difficult game three days before against Newcastle United. GC controlled most of the first period keeping the visitors at bay and FCB could only create two dangerous chances. In the second period GC pressed forward believing in their chance and on 63 minutes Eduardo put them into the lead. Basel reacted and pushed forward in their turn creating good opportunities, but the hosts defence held fast and salvaged the 1–0 lead over the final whistle.

Conclusion

Basel were eliminated early in the competition and missed their domestic cup aim. Grasshoppers advanced as far as the final, but here they were surprisingly defeated by Wil.

=== Europe ===
As runners-up in the Swiss championship the previous season and as Swiss Cup winners Basel were qualified for the UEFA Cup first round. The club's aim was remain in the UEFA Cup as long as possible. But after being the surprise package in Europe in the 2002–03 season, Basel could not bring this form into the UEFA Cup in 2003–04.

Malatyaspor (24 September 2003)

In the first round Basel were drawn against Malatyaspor and played the first leg away in the Malatya İnönü Stadium in Malatya in front of a sold out 10,000 capacity attendance. Basel had to play without their best scorer Christian Giménez, defender Timothée Atouba, and the midfield players Esposito and Ivan Ergic who were out injured. Basel started well into the game and their captain Murat Yakin put them a goal up after 15 minutes. The home team increased the pressure after the break and the visitors defence had to play at their best. Despite seeing the yellow card in the 51st minute, the visitors captain and centre back was the best Basel player on the day. Basel goalkeeper Pascal Zuberbühler also saw the yellow card in after 71 minutes for time-wasting, but he was able to keep a clean score sheet until the end of the game. The captains younger brother Hakan, who had been substituted in just seven minutes earlier, finished off Basel's good move in the 75th minute to give the visitors a two-goal lead. And the 2–0 lead was held up until the end of the game.

Return match (15 October 2003)

Basel started very quickly into the second leg match held at St. Jakob-Park with two good early chances. Hervé Tum's header after just 45 seconds was a little too wide and Timothée Atouba tried a long range shot only a minute later but this was somewhat too high. But then the home team then defended their aggregate lead by simply keeping their Turkish opponents at bay by giving them a lot of space in the midfield area. Basel's goalkeeper Pascal Zuberbühler only had to get involved once during the first half, this after 35 minutes as Muhammet Akagündüz appeared threateningly before him, but Atouba got back quickly to clear the danger. After the break the game changed. The visitors pushed forward with more pressure, Fazli Ulusoy had their first chance, but his shot hit the outside of the post. Then Celaleddin Koçak reacted quickest on a loose ball and to beat Zuberbühler after 64 minutes. Muhammet Akagündüz also saw his shot bounce back of the post after 71 minutes. Malatyaspor kept up their pressure and six minutes from time, Kocak managed to net his second goal as he reacted quicker than the Basel defence to beat Zuberbühler with a well-placed header. The game ended with an aggregate 2–2 draw and thus went into over time. The momentum of the second half seemed to be with the visitors, however, Basel were able to regroup themselves and Marco Streller's silver goal saw them through to the second round.

Newcastle United (6 November 2003)

In the second round Basel were drawn against Newcastle United. The first leg was held at St. Jakob-Park with a sell-out 30,000 capacity. Basel started quickly with much momentum at the beginning of the first half. They had already come close on a couple of occasions before Mario Cantaluppi slammed home a powerful drive from outside the penalty area in the 11th minute. The visitors reacted very quickly, Laurent Robert was sent clear of the defence two minutes later. The French winger finished with composure and he sent his low shot into the far corner of the goal. Another two minutes later Basel were awarded a corner kick. Defender Andy O'Brien headed the ball clear but the danger was not over. Scott Chipperfield was able to collect the free ball and his shot was slightly deflected as it beat Newcastle keeper Shay Given. Newcastle always seemed to be in danger as Basel pushed forward. Especially Christian Giménez was always dangerous and the tall Marco Streller was always a danger as high balls were sent into the centre. The English side deserve credit for standing out that spell without any further damage. Then the found their second equaliser. In the 37th minute Gary Speed first tried to send his header home after a Laurent Robert corner, but the ball was blocked, Titus Bramble reacted quickly on the loose ball and forced it over the line. Before the break Christian Giménez headed the ball against a post and in the second-half, substitute Julio Hernán Rossi forced Nolberto Solano to clear off the line when a corner came unexpectedly to him and diverted the ball with his face. Towards the end of the match Newcastle were the more dominant side and it was a pass from Solano that set up the winning goal. Shola Ameobi skilfully shook off Marco Zwyssig before driving the ball between the legs of keeper Pascal Zuberbühler. Basel's head coach Christian Gross blamed defensive errors for the 2–3 home defeat.

Return match (27 November 2003)

The second leg was played at St James' Park in front of 40,325 spectators and was arbitrated by Danish referee Knud Erik Fisker. He was the first-person taking action that evening by showing Newcastle's captain Alan Shearer a yellow card after just 15 seconds. In that action Basel defender Marco Zwyssig was injured and he left the game in the fourth minute, being substituted by Boris Smiljanić. Smiljanić himself was involved in the next action. A Laurent Robert corner was completely misjudged by Basel goalkeeper Pascal Zuberbühler and the ball bounced off the unlucky substitute's shin. Chipperfield cleared the ball, but it had already crossed the line and referee Fisker signalled the goal without hesitation. The rest of the game remained unspectacular, Newcastle controlled the game, but Basel remained dangerous on the counter. However, no further goals followed.

Basel were eliminated by Newcastle United in the second round 2–4 on aggregate.

Conclusion

The club had hoped that they could have continued a round or perhaps two further, but despite being knocked out at this stage, they considered that that had achieved their European aim for this season.

== Club ==
=== The Management ===
Position	Staff
Manager	(Switzerland) Christian Gross
Assistant manager	(Switzerland) Fritz Schmid
Fitness Coach	(Switzerland) Harry Körner
Goalkeeper Coach	(Switzerland) Thomas Grüter
Goalkeeper Coach	(Switzerland) Romain Crevoisier
Team Manager	(Germany) Oliver Kreuzer
Team Administrator	(Germany) Gustav Nussbaumer
Youth Team Coach U-21	(Switzerland) Heinz Hermann

Last updated: July 2003
Source: FC Basel Marketing AG (2004). Rotblau: FC Basel 1893, Das Magazin. FC Basel Marketing AG. ISSN 1660-0878.

=== Kit ===
Supplier: Nike
Sponsor(s): Novartis

Home	Away

=== Other information ===
Chairman	(Switzerland) Mr Werner Edelmann
Ground (capacity and dimensions)	St. Jakob-Park (33,433 / 120x80 m)

Source: Homepage FCB

== Players ==
=== First team squad ===
Note: Flags indicate national team as defined under FIFA eligibility rules; some limited exceptions apply. Players may hold more than one non-FIFA nationality.

No.	Pos.	Nation	Player
1	GK	SUI	Pascal Zuberbühler
4	DF	SUI	Alexandre Quennoz
5	DF	SUI	Marco Zwyssig
6	MF	SUI	Benjamin Huggel
7	FW	SUI	Esposito
8	CM	BRA	Zé Maria
8	MF	AUS	Mile Sterjovski
9	FW	SUI	Marco Streller
11	FW	CMR	Hervé Tum
12	MF	SUI	Sébastien Barberis
13	FW	ARG	Christian Eduardo Giménez
14	MF	ALG	Djamel Mesbah
15	DF	SUI	Murat Yakin
16	DF	SUI	Grégory Duruz

No.	Pos.	Nation	Player
17	MF	SUI	Mario Cantaluppi
18	GK	SUI	Eric Rapo
19	DF	BRA	Kléber
20	MF	ARG	Matías Emilio Delgado
21	MF	SUI	David Degen
22	MF	SCG	Ivan Ergić
23	DF	SUI	Philipp Degen
24	DF	CMR	Timothée Atouba
26	MF	AUS	Scott Chipperfield
29	MF	BIH	Damir Džombić
30	DF	SUI	Boris Smiljanić
32	FW	ARG	Francisco Gabriel Guerrero
33	FW	ARG	Julio Hernán Rossi
35	GK	AUT	Thomas Mandl
—	MF	SUI	Hakan Yakin

=== Transfers Summer 2003 ===
In

21	MF	SUI	David Degen (from FC Aarau – on loan)
—	CM	BRA	Zé Maria (from Prudentópolis Esporte Clube – on loan)
20	MF	ARG	Matías Emilio Delgado (from Chacarita Juniors – n/a)
—	MF	SUI	Hakan Yakin (return transfer from Paris Saint-Germain)

Out

—	DF	SUI	Philippe Cravero (to Servette – free transfer)
—	DF	SUI	Bernt Haas (to West Bromwich Albion – end of loan)
—	FW	ESP	Carlos Varela (to FC Aarau – on loan)
—	MF	SUI	Hakan Yakin (to Paris Saint-Germain – transfer)
—	MF	AUS	Ljubo Miličević (to Zürich – end of loan)

=== Transfers Winter 2003–04 ===
In

8	MF	AUS	Mile Sterjovski (from Lille)
32	FW	ARG	Francisco Gabriel Guerrero (from FC Zürich – on loan)

Out

—	MF	SUI	Antonio Esposito (to Varese – free transfer)
—	CM	BRA	Zé Maria (to Prudentópolis Esporte Clube – end of loan)

== Results and fixtures ==
Legend

Win Draw Loss Postponed

=== Friendlies ===
==== Pre- and mid-season friendlies ====
25 June 2003 Pre-season	Celerina Selection (Switzerland)	0–8	(Switzerland) Basel	San Gian, Celerina
18:15		FCB summary	3' (1:0) Giménez; 8' (2:0) Giménez; 11' (3:0) Huggel; 17' (4:0) Chipperfield; 42' (5:0) Rossi; 46' (6:0) Huggel; 58' (7:0) Fejzulahi; 72' (8:0) Varela	Attendance: 800; Referee: (Switzerland) Patric Collet
Note: FCB without the Yakins, Zuberbühler, Zwyssig, Haas, Ergic, Tum, and Atouba. Both teams with a full selection of substitions.

28 June 2003 Pre-season	Basel (Switzerland)	2–0	(Germany) Karlsruher SC	Vicques
18:30	Barberis 19' (1:0); Chipperfield 28' (2:0); (yellow card) 75' P. Degen	FCB summary	(yellow card) 75' Ouakili; (yellow card) 79' Stoll	Attendance: 1,973; Referee: (Switzerland) Renzo Peduzzi
Note: FCB without Zuberbühler, Zwyssig, Hakan and Murat Yakin, Haas, Streller (all vacation due to Swiss national team appearances), Varela, Tum, Gimenez, Ergic (all injured) and Atouba (Cameroon national team). KSC without Walter, Eggimann, Hassa and Trares (all injured)

12 July 2003 Pre-season	Basel (Switzerland)	2–1	(France) AJ Auxerre	Centre Sportif, Delley-Portalban
17:00	Cantaluppi 17' (1:0); Rossi 72' (2:1)	FCB summary	57' (1:1) Esteves; (yellow card) 70' Mignot	Attendance: 3,000; Referee: (Switzerland) Florian Etter
Note: Auxerre without Cissé, Kapo, Mexes and Hamel, among others. Basel without Ergic (ill), Tum, Murat and Hakan Yakin (all injured).

19 July 2003 Mid-season friendly	Basel (Switzerland)	2–2	(Romania) Rapid Bucharest	Europastadion, Rheinfelden (Baden)
19:30	Cantaluppi 45' (pen.); Atouba (yellow card) 52'; Smiljanić (yellow card) 67'; Giménez 66'	FCB summary	6' Braku; (yellow card) 41' Maftei; (yellow card) 43' Ziati; (yellow card) 62' Ilyes; 60' Nikolai	Attendance: 1,800; Referee: (Germany) Ralf Brombacher
Note: FCB without Hakan and Murat Yakin, Huggel, Tum (all injured) and Ergic (sick). Major absentee (in Miami at the Gold Cup).

5 August 2003 Mid-season friendly	Basel (Switzerland)	3–1	(Switzerland) SR Delémont	Sportplatz Nau, Laufen
19:00	Rossi 28' (1:0); Streller 46' (2:0); Fejzulahi 81' (3:1)	FCB summary	53' (2:1) Savic	Attendance: 2,400; Referee: (Switzerland) Claudio Circhetta (Muttenz)
Note: FCB without Zuberbühler, Atouba, Quennoz, Yakin, Gimenez, Cantaluppi (all injured/rested) and without Ergic (sick), Smiljanic and Esposito (both injured)

12 August 2003 Mid-season friendly	FC Mulhouse (France)	1–5	(Switzerland) Basel	Stade de l'Ill, Mulhouse
20:00	Coquio 30' (1:2); Tjock (yellow card) 68'	FCB summary	8' (0:1) Giménez; 17' (0:2) Giménez; 40' (1:3) Streller; 77' (1:4) Barberis; 88' (1:5) Tum	Attendance: 180; Referee: (France) Chevrier
Note: Basel without Murat Yakin, Chipperfield, Esposito, Zuberbühler, Quennoz (all injured or rested) and without Ergic (convalescent). 2nd half is led by assistant referee Bouchet.

27 August 2003 Mid-season friendly	FC Laufen (Switzerland)	0–6	(Switzerland) Basel	Sportplatz Nau, Laufen
18:30		FCB summary	13' (1:0) Streller; 51' (2:0) Streller; 63' (3:0) Streller; 65' (4:0) Ze Maria; 68' (5:0) Tum; 72' (6:0) Quennoz	Attendance: 2,100; Referee: (Switzerland) Markus Von Känel
Note: Fair game, no yellow cards

9 September 2003 Exhibition game	SV Muttenz (Switzerland)	0–4	(Switzerland) Basel	Sportplatz Margelacker, Muttenz
18:30		FCB summary	5' (0:1) Delgado; 58' (0:2) Delgado; 68' (0:3) Delgado; 75' (0:4) Giménez	Attendance: 1,700; Referee: (Switzerland) Daniel Wermelinger (Aarau)
Note: Fair game, no yellow cards

16 Sept. 2003 Mid-season friendly	SC Dornach (Switzerland)	0–2	(Switzerland) Basel	Gigersloch, Dornach
19:00		FCB summary	14' (0:1) Delgado; 20' (0:2) Tum	Attendance: 4,000; Referee: (Switzerland) Martin Salm (Veltheim, Aargau)
Note: Fair game, no yellow cards

10 October 2003 Mid-season friendly	RC Strasbourg Alsace (France)	1–0	(Switzerland) Basel	Stade de l'Ill, Mulhouse
20:00	Devaux 73' (1:0)	FCB summary		Attendance: 1,900; Referee: (France) Philippe Kalt
Note: FCB without Zuberbühler, Murat and Hakan Yakin, Huggel, Zwyssig, Streller (all national team Switzerland), Philipp Degen (U21 Switzerland), Atouba (national team Cameroon), Gimenez, Smiljanic, Delgado (all injured), Ergic (convalescent). FCB in the second half with Duruz in central defense, Conçalves on the left, from 77th with test player Henrique Cornelio Ben on the right, David Degen at right-back. 47th minute, a goal by Tum was disallowed canceled due to an alleged offside. Fair game, no yellow cards

18 November 2003 Exhibition game	Basel (Switzerland)	2–2	(Switzerland) Concordia	Athletic Satdium, Basel
16:00	Rossi 14' (1:0); Chipperfield 40' (2:0)	FCB summary	(yellow card) 42' Meili; (yellow card) 64' Biancavilla; 50' (pen. 1:0) Tchouga; 56' (2:2) Tchouga; (yellow card) 62' Amiti; (yellow card) 86' Gloor	Attendance: 820; Referee: (Switzerland) Markus Von Känel
Note: FCB without Cantaluppi (sick), Esposito, Delgado (injured), Ergic (convalescent), Streller, P. and D. Degen (all U21), Atouba (NM Cameroon); Concordia without O. and F. Tato, Citrano, Cardoso, Zitola (all injured). 42nd minute, Concordia goalkeeper Meili received the yellow card for a hand ball outside the penalty area.

==== Uhrencup ====
The Uhrencup is a club football tournament, held annually in Grenchen.

2 July 2003 Semi-final	Basel (Switzerland)	4–2	(Austria) Casino Bregenz	Stadion Brühl, Grenchen
20:00	Aslan 9' (o.g. 1:0); Rossi 28' (2:1); Giménez 42' (3:1); Giménez 55' (4:1)	FCB summary	15' (1:1) Berchtold; 58' (4:2) Aslan	Attendance: 4,118; Referee: (Switzerland) Claudio Circhetta (Muttenz)
Note: 2003 Uhrencup semi-final. FCB without Murat and Hakan Yakin, Zuberbühler, and Atouba (all absent), as well as Tum and Ergic (both injured).

4 July 2003 Final	Basel (Switzerland)	1–0	(Switzerland) BSC Young Boys	Stadion Brühl, Grenchen
20:45	Streller 61' (0:1)	FCB summary		Attendance: 6,681; Referee: (Switzerland) Markus Nobs (Wohlen bei Bern)
Note: Final of the 2003 Uhrencup. FCB without Zuberbühler, Murat Yakin, Hakan Yakin, and Atouba (all absent), as well as Ergic and Tum (both injured). YB were without Berisha (injured) and Patrick (absent).

==== Alpen Cup ====
7 July 2003 Semi-final	Basel (Switzerland)	3–3 (5–3 p)	(Germany) Hannover 96	Stadion Rankhof, Basel
21:10	M. Yakin 17' (pen. 1:1); Huggel 26' (2:1); Streller 58' (3:2)	FCB summary	12' (0:1) Stendel; 35' (2:2) de Guzman; 63' (3:3) Christiansen	Attendance: 6,000; Referee: (Switzerland) Jérôme Laperrière (Kerzers)
	Penalties
	M. Yakin (penalty scored); Giménez (penalty scored); Chipperfield (penalty scored); Smiljanić (penalty scored); Esposito (penalty scored)		(penalty scored) Vinícius; (penalty scored) N'Diaye; (penalty missed) Dabrowski; (penalty scored) Stendel

9 July 2003 Final	Basel (Switzerland)	5–2	(Turkey) Beşiktaş J.K	Stadion Rankhof, Basel
21:10	Smiljanić 20' (1:0); Rossi 25' (2:0); Giménez 32' (3:0); H. Yakin 45' (4:0); Streller 56' (5:0); Varela (yellow card) 77'	FCB summary	74' (5:1) Sinan; 86' (5:2) Tayfur	Attendance: 5,200; Referee: (Switzerland) Philippe Leuba (Chexbres)
Note: 2003 Alpine Cup semi-final in Basel. FCB were without Ergic (ws ill), Tum (injured), and Atouba (absent). Hannover were missing several players, including Simak (absent). Fair game, no cautions were issued.

==== Winter break and mid-season friendlies ====
13 January 2004 Winter Break	Baden (Switzerland)	0–4	(Switzerland) Basel	Barz, Zurzach
18:00		FCB summary	15' (0:1) Tum; 45' (0:2) H. Yakin; 53' (0:3) H. Yakin; 15' (0:1), 66' (0:4) Tum	Attendance: 1,100; Referee: (Switzerland) Martin Salm (Veltheim, Aargau)
Note: Baden without Greco and Yrusta (both injured) and Deon (was ill on the day). Basel without Ergic, M. Yakin, Esposito and Duruz (all rested); D. and P. Degen (both with the U-21s); Streller (transferred to Stuttgart); Zwyssig (granted the evening off); Atouba (at the Africa Cup of Nations with natiomal team of Cameroon); as well as Gimenez and Rossi (both already in Argentina).

20 January 2004 Winter Break	Club Atlético Vélez Sársfield (Argentina)	1–1	(Switzerland) Basel	Villa Olímpica de Vélez Sarsfield, Ituzaingó Buenos Aires,
17:45	Martinez 90+1' (1:1) de Souza (yellow card) 44'; Pellerano (yellow card) 76'; Flotta (yellow card) 83'	FCB summary	30' (0:1) Rossi; (yellow card) 69' Smiljanić; (yellow card) 81' D. Degen; (yellow card) 90' Quennoz	Attendance: 1,000; Referee: (Argentina) Bermudez
Note: Velez without goalkeeper Chilavert, among others. FCB without M. Yakin, Ergic, and Gimenez (all recovering from injury).

22 January 2004 Winter Break	Club Atlético Lanús (Argentina)	0–0	(Switzerland) Basel	Polideportivo Municipal, Pinamar
	Moiragui (yellow card) 63'	FCB summary	(yellow card) 60' Huggel	Referee: (Argentina) Rutini
Note: FCB without Atouba (at the Africa Cup with Cameroon), Gimenez, M. Yakin and Ergic (all recovering from injury), as well as Zuberbühler (rested). 19th minute, A free kick by Biglieri (Lanús) hit the crossbar.

25 January 2004 Winter Break	San Lorenzo de Almagro (Argentina)	0–0	(Switzerland) Basel	Villa Deportiva de Cadetes de San Martin, Mar del Plata
		FCB summary		Attendance: 100; Referee: (Argentina) Nesor Gorosito
Note: San Lorenzo without Gonzalo Rodriguez (who was in Chile with Argentina’s U-23 team). FCB without Atouba (at the Africa Cup of Nations with Cameroon), as well as M. Yakin and Ergic (both recovering from injury). In the 66th minute, Smiljanic left the pitch with a strained calf. In the 85th minute, Esposito was substituted off following a dispute with head-coach Christian Gross and was not replaced. Corners: 3–4 (2–1).

6 February 2004 Winter Break	Bellinzona (Switzerland)	1–3	(Switzerland) Basel	Stadio Comunale, Bellinzona
18:00	Pit 71' (pen. 1:3)	FCB summary	42' (0:1) Giménez; 46' (0:2) Delgado; 64' (0:3) Tum	Attendance: 800; Referee: (Switzerland) Massimo Busacca (Monte Carasso/Bellinzona)
Note: Bellinzona without Cavin, Immersi, Miccolis, and Quintero (all left out of the squad). FCB without Esposito (suspended intern), Yakin and Smiljanic (both injured), Ergic (undergoing fitness training), Chipperfield and Rossi (both rested), and Atouba (away at the Africa Cup of Nations with Cameroon). Fair game, no yellow cards

7 February 2004 Winter Break	Malcantone Agno (Switzerland)	0–1	(Switzerland) Basel	Stadio Cornaredo, Lugano
	Rothenbühler (yellow card) 18'; Ramos (yellow card) 39'	FCB summary	18' (pen. 0:1) Giménez; (yellow card) 68' D. Degen	Attendance: 320; Referee: (Switzerland) Reto Rutz (Amriswil)
Note: Malcantone Agno without Abächerli, Ferretti, Enrique and Morf (all injured); FCB without Yakin and Smiljanic (both injured), Atouba (at the Africa Cup of Nations with Cameroon) and Ergic (undergoing rehabilitation training). Zuberbühler and Huggel were rested and remained on the substitutes' bench. Corners: 6:10 (5:6).

28 April 2004 Mid-season	SV Muttenz (Switzerland)	0–1	(Switzerland) Basel	Sportplatz Margelacker, Muttenz
19:00		FCB summary	40' Dustin Wells	Attendance: 1,645; Referee: (Switzerland) Claudio Circhetta (Muttenz)
Note: Playing time 2x 40 minutes. FCB with test player Dustin Wells from Wollongong City Wolves after the collapse of the Australian National Soccer League.

=== 2003–04 Swiss Super League ===
==== First half of season ====
In the newly reformed Swiss Super League, this season was to be contested by ten teams. It began on 16 July 2003 and was completed on 23 May 2004.

16 July 2003 Round 1	Basel	2–1	Zürich	St. Jakob-Park, Basel
19:30	H. Yakin 33' (1:0); Esposito (yellow card) 42'; Huggel 86' (2:1)	FCB summary FCZ summary	51' (1:1) Keita; (yellow card) 82' Buess; (yellow card) 85' Gygax	Attendance: 30,561; Referee: (Switzerland) Philippe Leuba (Chexbres)
Note: FCB without Cantaluppi and Streller (both suspended), as well as Murat Yakin and Tum (both injured) and Ergic (long-term illness). FCZ were without Nef, Yasar and Stanic (all injured), as well as Dal Santo (ineligible to play). 300th game for goalie Pascal Zuberbühler in the Nationalliga A.

22 July 2003 Round 2	Young Boys	2–3	Basel	Stadion Neufeld, Bern
19:30	Leandro 27' (1:1); Magnin 47' (2:1)	FCB summary	20' (0:1) Giménez; (yellow card) 38' Quennoz; 48' (2:2) Streller; 75' (2:3) Esposito	Attendance: 11,850 (sold out); Referee: (Switzerland) Massimo Busacca (Monte Carasso/Bellinzona)
Note: The Young Boys played their home games in the Stadion Neufeld after the Wankdorf Stadium was demolished in 2001 and the new Stadion Wankdorf was constructed on the same site. YB without Sermeter (suspended), Bell, Berisha, Disler and Patrick. FCB without Smiljanic, Tum, Hakan Yakin and Murat Yakin (all injured), as well as Ergic (long-term illness).

26 July 2003 Round 3	Basel	4–2	Xamax	St. Jakob-Park, Basel
19:30	Esposito (yellow card) 7'; P. Degen 11' (1:0); Giménez 19' (2:0); Giménez 46' (3:0); M. Yakin 90+3' (pen. 4:2)	FCB summary	(yellow card) 28' Daffe; (yellow card) 33' Bättig; (yellow card) 40' Zambaz; 60' (3:1) Mangane; (yellow card) 40' Portillo; 85' (3:2) Margairaz	Attendance: 29,055; Referee: (Liechtenstein) Roland Beck (Triesenberg)
Note: FCB without Hakan Yakin, Smiljanic and Tum (all injured) as well as Ergic (long-term illness); Xamax without Naoki (ineligible to play). 59th minute, Quennoz deflected the ball onto his own crossbar.

2 August 2003 Round 4	Wil	2–3	Basel	Stadion Bergholz, Wil
19:30	Lustrinelli 17' (1:0); Renggli (yellow card) 39'; Romano 90' (2:3)	FCB summary	(yellow card) 34' Cantaluppi; 61' (1:1) M. Yakin; (yellow card) 67' P. Degen; 76' (1:2) Atouba; (yellow card) 78' Barberis; 80' (1:3) Streller	Attendance: 5,600; Referee: (Switzerland) Martin Salm (Veltheim, Aargau)
Note: Wil without Rogerio (injured). FCB without Ergic (long-term illness), Smiljanic and Tum (both injured).

9 August 2003 Round 5	Basel	3–1	Aarau	St. Jakob-Park, Basel
19:30	Atouba (yellow card) 17'; M. Yakin 21' (1:0); Rossi 69' (2:1); Huggel 79' (3:1)	FCB summary FCA summary	(yellow card) 20' Seoane; (yellow card) 28' Varela; 59' (2:1) de Napoli; (yellow card) 78' Wittl; (yellow card) 79' Christ	Attendance: 24,430; Referee: (Switzerland) Nicole Petignat (Courgenay)
Note: FCB without Ergic (long-term illness), Esposito, Quennoz, and Smiljanic (all injured). FCA without Edilson and Opango (both injured). 49th minute, a shot from Huggel hit the post.

16 August 2003 Round 6	Thun	0–4	Basel	Stadion Lachen, Thun
19:30	Cerrone (yellow card) 57'	FCB summary	13' (0:1) Giménez; 26' (0:4) Giménez; 63' (0:3) Streller; (yellow card) 64' Cantaluppi; 84' (0:4) Giménez	Attendance: 8,150; Referee: (Switzerland) Urs Meier (Wettingen and Würenlos)
Note: Thun without Baummann and Ferreira (neither in the squad). First appearance for Israel Rodriguez from Paraguay. FCB without Ergic (long-term illness), as well as Esposito, Smiljanic and Philipp Degen (all injured). 81st minute: a shot from Barberis hit the post.

24 August 2003 Round 7	Basel	6–0	Servette	St. Jakob-Park, Basel
16:15	Streller 22' (1:0); Huggel (yellow card) 24'; Giménez 29' (2:0); Chipperfield 31' (3:0); Giménez 53' (4:0); M. Yakin 71' (pen. 5:0); Tum 84' (6:0)	FCB summary	(yellow card) 33' Aziawonou; (yellow card) 71' Roth; (yellow card) 79' Zambrella	Attendance: 29,821; Referee: (Switzerland) Carlo Bertolini (Vira-Gambarogno)
Note: FCB without Ergic (long-term illness), Esposito and Smiljanic (both injured); Servette without Hilton and Bah (both injured). 63rd minute, a shot from Jaquet hit the post.

31 August 2003 Round 8	Grasshoppers	0–4	Basel	Hardturm, Zürich
16:15	Spycher (yellow card) 59'	FCB summary	39' (0:1) M. Yakin; 52' (0:2) Streller; 58' (0:3) Huggel; 82' (0:4) Streller	Attendance: 17,666; Referee: (Switzerland) Markus Nobs (Wohlen bei Bern)
Note: GC without Jaggy and Schwegler (both injured). FCB without Esposito, Hakan Yakin, Gimenez and Smiljanic (all injured), as well as Ergic (long-term illness).

3 September 2003 Round 9	Basel	4–1	St. Gallen	St. Jakob-Park, Basel
19:30	Cantaluppi (yellow card) 35'; P. Degen (yellow card) 51'; Huggel 56' (1:0); M. Yakin 67' (2:0); Tum 70' (3:0); Streller 72' (4:0)	FCB summary	(yellow card) 36' Balmer; (yellow card) 58' Alex; 63' Zellweger	Attendance: 29,846; Referee: (Switzerland) Guido Wildhaber (Kerzers)
Note: FCB without Esposito, Gimenez, Smiljanic and Hakan Yakin (all injured), as well as Ergic (long-term illness). St. Gallen will be without Oberli and Calo (both injured).

14 September 2003 Round 10	Zürich	0–1	Basel	Letzigrund, Zürich
16:15	Petrosyan (yellow card) 77'; Gygax (yellow card) 80'	FCB summary FCZ summary	4' (0:1) Rossi; (yellow card) 32' (yellow-red card) 80' Chipperfield; (yellow card) 43' Smiljanić	Attendance: 18,200; Referee: (Liechtenstein) Roland Beck (Triesenberg)
Note: FCZ without Yasar, Abdi (both injured), and Muff (suspended). FCB without Atouba, Duruz and Esposito (all injured), as well as Hakan Yakin (recovering from injury; he played for the U-21 team) and without Ergic (long-term illness). Stipe Matić made his debut for FCZ. 40th minute, FCB goalkeeper Zuberbühler tipped a header from Keita against the crossbar and out for a corner.

28 September 2003 Round 11	Basel	2–0	Young Boys	St. Jakob-Park, Basel
16:15	Streller 16' (1:0); Streller 18' (2:0); Rossi (yellow card) 42'; Cantaluppi (yellow card) 75'; P. Degen (yellow card) 86'; D. Degen (yellow card) 87'	FCB summary	(yellow card) 30' Sermeter; (yellow card) 40' Giallanza; (yellow card) 81' Chapuisat	Attendance: 30,760 (sold out); Referee: (Switzerland) René Rogalla (Wallisellen)
Note: FCB without Gimenez (injured), Chipperfield (suspended), Ergic (long-term illness) and Esposito (played for the U-21 in the 1.Liga). YB were without Berisha, Patrick, Vella and Coubageat (all injured). 26th minute, a goal by Streller was correctly disallowed for offside. In the 27th minute, a goal by Streller was incorrectly disallowed for offside. 28th minute, a header by Rochat hit the crossbar. 39th minute, a shot by Tum hit the post. 64th minute, a header by Rossi struck the crossbar. 74th minute, a goal by Rossi was correctly disallowed.

2 October 2003 Round 12	Xamax	1–3	Basel	Stade de la Maladière, Neuchâtel
19:30	Portillo (yellow card) 57'; Forschelet (yellow card) 67'; Ojong 76' (1:3)	FCB summary	35' (0:1) Barberis; 41' (0:2) H. Yakin; (yellow card) 45' H. Yakin; (yellow card) 68' Streller; 68' (0:3) Delgado; (yellow card) 88' Atouba	Attendance: 12,100; Referee: (Switzerland) Guido Wildhaber (Kerzers)
Note: Xamax were without Bättig, Daffe, and Rey (all injured) as well as Mangane (suspended). FCB without Cantaluppi (suspended), Gimenez and Smiljanic (both injured) and Ergic (long-term illness). In the stands were scouts from Manchester United, Liverpool, Werder Bremen, and Schalke 04, along with Guy Roux (manager of Auxerre). 14th minute, a goal by Rossi was disallowed (offside). 58th minute, a shot from Delgado hit the crossbar. 79th minute, a goal by Zwyssig was disallowed (offside).

5 October 2003 Round 13	Basel	4–0	Wil	St. Jakob-Park, Basel
16:15	Streller 4' (1:0); Huggel 36' (2:0); Streller 53' (3:0); P. Degen 55' (4:0); Zwyssig (yellow card) 70'; Zé Maria (yellow card) 82'	FCB summary	(yellow card) 34' Nushi; (yellow card) 62' Montandon; (yellow card) 83' Blunschi	Attendance: 29,850; Referee: (Switzerland) Jérôme Laperrière (Kerzers)
Note: FCB without Gimenez, Tum, Smiljanic and Hakan Yakin (all injured), as well as Ergic (long-term illness). Wil without Mordeku and Romano (both injured). Swiss national coach Köbi Kuhn was in the stands.

27 October 2003 Round 14	Aarau	2–2	Basel	Stadion Brügglifeld, Aarau
16:15	de Napoli 6' (1:0) de Napoli (yellow card) 32'; Varela (yellow card) 49' de Napoli 66' (2:2)	FCB summary FCA summary	(yellow card) 7' Barberis; 27' (1:1) Chipperfield; (yellow card) 44' P. Degen; 54' (1:2) Tum; (yellow card) 56' Cantaluppi	Attendance: 9,250; Referee: (Switzerland) Philippe Leuba (Chexbres)
Note: FCB without Ergic (long-term illness). 31st minute FCA midfielder Bühler substituted out injured. Basel's run of winning 16 games in a row (including three games last season) came to an end here.

29 October 2003 Round 15	Basel	2–0	Thun	St. Jakob-Park, Basel
19:30	D. Degen 38' (1:0); H. Yakin 63' (2:0); P. Degen (yellow card) 90'	FCB summary		Attendance: 29,029; Referee: (Switzerland) Reto Rutz (Amriswil)
Note: FCB without Delgado, Esposito, Rossi, and Tum (all injured) and Ergic (was ill); Thun without Deumi and Dos Santos (both injured).

2 November 2003 Round 16	Servette	1–2	Basel	Stade de Genève, Lancy
16:15	Kader 56' (1:1); Bah (yellow card) 79'; Diogo (yellow card) 90+3'	FCB summary	31' (0:1) Huggel; (yellow card) 75' M. Yakin; 79' (1:2)Rossi	Attendance: 18,800; Referee: (Switzerland) Urs Meier (Wettingen and Würenlos)
Note: Servette were without Fournier and Jaquet (both injured) and Lombardo (suspended). FCB without Delgado, Esposito, and Tum (all injured), Philipp Degen (suspended), Ergic (was ill), and Hakan Yakin (rested). 31st minute, a header by Murat Yakin hit the post.

23 November 2003 Round 17	Basel	5–2	Grasshoppers	St. Jakob-Park, Basel
16:15	Cantaluppi 14' (1:1); Streller 16' (2:1); Streller 42' (3:1); Chipperfield 49' (4:1); Huggel 55' (5:1)	FCB summary	11' (0:1) da Silva; (yellow card) 86' Tararache; 90' (5:2) Magro	Attendance: 30,800 (sold out); Referee: (Liechtenstein) Roland Beck (Triesenberg)
Note: FCB without Murat Yakin, Delgado, Gimenez, and Esposito (all injured), Atouba (was ill), and Ergic (recovering from illness). GC without Gamboa, Gane, Lichtsteiner, Jaggy and Shala (all injured). This was the 159th and final NLA match for referee Roland Beck, aged 44 at the time.

30 November 2003 Round 18	St. Gallen	1–2	Basel	Espenmoos, St. Gallen
16:15	Mirenda 45' (1:1)	FCB summary	14' (0:1) Tum; 60' (1:2) Chipperfield; (yellow card) 64' D. Degen; (red card) 75' Rossi	Attendance: 11,300 (sold out); Referee: (Switzerland) Urs Meier (Wettingen and Würenlos)
Note: St. Gallen without Imhof, Barnetta (both suspended), Oberli, Longo, and Agosti (all injured); Basel without Streller and Ergic (both ill), Zwyssig, Gimenez, Murat Yakin, Delgado and Esposito (all injured).

==== Second half of season ====
15 February 2004 Round 19	Young Boys	0–1	Basel	Stadion Neufeld, Bern
16:00	Friedli (yellow card) 18'; Coubageat (yellow card) 48'; Sermeter (yellow card) 68'; Leandro (yellow card) 87'	FCB summary	(yellow card) 38' Chipperfield; 54' (0:1) Giménez; (yellow card) 75' Barberis; (yellow card) 90+1' Huggel	Attendance: 11,850 (sold out); Referee: (Switzerland) Philippe Leuba (Chexbres)
Note: YB without Berisha, Patrick and Adrian Eugster (all injured), Ivan and Melunovic (both not eligible to play). FCB without Rossi (suspended), Smiljanic and Murat Yakin (both injured) and Ergic (recovering from illness). 37th minute, a goal by Chapuisat was disallowed for offside. 87th minute a goal by Leandro was disallowed for offside.

22 February 2004 Round 20	Basel	2–2	Grasshoppers	St. Jakob-Park, Basel
16:00	P. Degen 9' (1:0); Tum 30' (2:0)	FCB summary	(yellow card) 37' Lichtsteiner; (yellow card) 56' Tararache; 60' (3:0) Eduardo; (yellow card) 62' Cabanas; 63' (4:0) Eduardo; (yellow card) 75' Ziegler	Attendance: 26,851; Referee: (Switzerland) Massimo Busacca (Monte Carasso/Bellinzona)
Note: FCB without Murat Yakin and Smiljanic (both injured), Rossi and Chipperfield (both suspended) and Ergic (recovering from illness). GC without Magro, Jaggy and Schwegler (all injured).

28 February 2004 Round 21	Basel	6–0	Xamax	St. Jakob-Park, Basel
19:30	M. Yakin 1' (1:0); Tum 10' (2:0); Tum (yellow card) 27'; Cantaluppi (yellow card) 52'; Tum 53' (3:0); Giménez 69' (4:0); Giménez 71' (5:0); Giménez (yellow card) 85'; Guerrero 90' (6:0)	FCB summary	(yellow card) 23' von Bergen; (yellow card) 43' Griffiths; (yellow card) 56' M'Futi; (yellow card) 61' Barea; (yellow card) 68' Forschelet; (yellow card) 81' Mangane; (yellow card) 91+1' Hassli	Attendance: 21,803; Referee: (Switzerland) Martin Salm (Veltheim, Aargau)
Note: FCB without Rossi (suspended), Ergic (recovering from illness/injury), and Delgado (injured). Xamax without Daffe, Leroy, Margairaz and reserve goalkeeper Delay (all injured). This was the first match for the Neuchâtel side under their new coach René Lobello. 92nd minute, a shot from Zwyssig hit the crossbar. Very rough match, but very good referee.

7 March 2004 Round 22	St. Gallen	1–1	Basel	Espenmoos, St. Gallen
14:30	Wolf 20' (1:0); Naldo (yellow card) 61' (yellow-red card) 77'	FCB summary	43' (1:1) Huggel; (yellow card) 55' Tum	Attendance: 9,000; Referee: (Switzerland) René Rogalla (Wallisellen)
Note: St. Gallen without Barnetta (suspended), Longo, Lazaroni, and Pavlovic (all injured); Basel without Ergic (recovering) and Quennoz (injured).

13 March 2004 Round 23	Basel	1–1	Thun	St. Jakob-Park, Basel
19:30	Cantaluppi (yellow card) 13'; Rossi (yellow card) 25'; Giménez 32' (1:1)	FCB summary	2' (0:1) Lustrinelli; (yellow card) 20'Baykal; (yellow card) 52' Zanni	Attendance: 23,223; Referee: (Switzerland) Carlo Bertolini (Vira-Gambarogno)
Note: FCB without Murat Yakin (injured), Ergic (recovering from illness) and Atouba (with the Cameroonian Olympic team); Thun without Milicevic and Deumi (both injured). 67th minute, following the substitution of Delgado, Huggel played as a hanging forward for FCB.

17 March 2004 Round 24	Zürich	1–0	Basel	Letzigrund, Zürich
19:30	Gygax 7' (1:0); Chihab (yellow card) 11'; Dal Santo (yellow card) 58'; Taini (yellow card) 87'; Petrosyan (yellow card) 90+2'	FCB summary FCZ summary	(yellow card) 13' Delgado; (yellow card) 67' Chipperfield; (yellow card) 90+1' Smiljanić	Attendance: 16,200; Referee: (Switzerland) Nicole Petignat (Courgenay)
Note: FCZ without Di Jorio and Schneider (both suspended), Bastida and Buess (both injured). FCB without Murat Yakin and Rapo (both injured) and Ergic (recovering from longterm illness). FCB suffered their first league defeat, after an unbeaten run of 29 games, over two seasons.

20 March 2004 Round 25	Basel	3–1	Aarau	St. Jakob-Park, Basel
19:30	Cantaluppi (yellow card) 28'; Giménez 43' (1:1); Rossi 71' (2:1); Giménez 76' (3:1)	FCB summary FCA summary	(yellow card) 24' Gaspoz; 27' (0:1) Opango; (yellow card) 51' Tcheutchoua; (yellow card) 64' Seoane; (yellow card) 64' Opango; (yellow card) 67' Moretto	Attendance: 26,099; Referee: (Switzerland) Guido Wildhaber (Kerzers)
Note: FCB without Murat Yakin (injured) and Ergic (recovering from longterm illness). FCA without De Napoli, Keller and Varela (all suspended), as well as Christ (injured). 14th minute, a goal by Gimenez was disallowed for offside. 15th minute, a shot from Huggel hit the crossbar. 71st minute, a header from Huggel hit the post.

28 March 2004 Round 26	Wil	1–1	Basel	Stadion Bergholz, Wil
14:30	Blunschi 53' (1:1)	FCB summary	39' (0:1) Rossi; (yellow card) 45' Smiljanić; (yellow card) 62' Huggel; (yellow card) 83' Barberis	Attendance: 5,400; Referee: (Switzerland) Urs Meier (Wettingen and Würenlos)
Note: Wil without Callà (suspended), Beney, Fabinho, Gsell and Savic (all injured), as well as Helder (not in the squad/abroad). FCB without Cantaluppi (suspended), Quennoz and Murat Yakin (both injured) and Ergic (undergoing rehabilitation training).

4 April 2004 Round 27	Servette	1–4	Basel	Stade de la Praille, Lancy
14:30	Bah (yellow card) 23'; Zambrella (yellow card) 43'; Obradović 59' (1:1)	FCB summary	(yellow card) 16' Delgado; 38' (0:1) Giménez; 60' (1:2) D. Degen; 71' (1:3) Atouba; 90+2' (1:4) Chipperfield	Attendance: 18,683; Referee: (Switzerland) Massimo Busacca (Monte Carasso/Bellinzona)
Note: Servette without Mesbah (suspended), Londono and Comisetti (both injured), FCB without Cantaluppi, Huggel, Barberis (all suspended), Murat Yakin, Quennoz, Rapo (all injured) and Ergic (undergoing rehabilitation training).

8 April 2004 Round 28	Basel	1–0	Servette	St. Jakob-Park, Basel
19:30	Rossi 56' (1:0)	FCB summary	(yellow card) 33' Vardanyan	Attendance: 26,649; Referee: (Switzerland) Markus Nobs (Wohlen bei Bern)
Note: FCB without Huggel, Quennoz, Murat Yakin and Rapo (all injured), and Ergic (undergoing rehabilitation training). 300th NLA match for Cantaluppi. Servette without Sarni (suspended), and Aziawonou, Londono, Fournier and Comisetti (all injured). 31st minute, Giménez was substituted out injured. 48th minute, a free kick by Chipperfeld hit the post.

15 April 2004 Round 29	Basel	2–0	Wil	St. Jakob-Park, Basel
19:30	Chipperfield 1' (1:0); Delgado 58' (2:0); Tum (yellow card) 77'	FCB summary	(yellow card) 54' Previtali	Attendance: 24,515; Referee: (Switzerland) Cyril Zimmermann (Bolligen)
Note: First top-tier game for referee Cyril Zimmermann (27). FCB without Quennoz, Rapo and Murat Yakin (all injured) as well as Ergic (undergoing rehabilitation training). Wil without Beney, Eugster, Pires and Rizzo (all injured), Montandon (was ill), Gillet (ineligible to play), and Nushi (suspended). Debut for Wil’s Mario Schönenberger (18). 11th minute, Wil's Patrick Winkler had to leave the pitch due to an injury.

18 April 2004 Round 30	Aarau	3–0	Basel	Stadion Brügglifeld, Aarau
14:30	Wittl 4' (1:0); Tcheutchoua 60' (2:0); Bieli (yellow card) 73'; Zuberbühler 77' (o.g. 3:0); Opango (yellow card) 90'	FCB summary FCA summary	(yellow card) 25' Džombić; (yellow card) 76' D. Degen	Attendance: 9,250 (sold out); Referee: (Austria) Stefan Messner
Note: This match was played as part of the interaction referee exchange between the Swiss Football Association and the Austrian Football Association. FCA without Gaspoz and Schmid (both suspended) as well as Menezes (injured). FCB without Murat Yakin, Rapo, Quennoz, and Zwyssig (all injured), and Ergic (recovering from illness). Damir Dzombic (19), a native of Bosnia, made his Super League debut in FCB’s central defense.

24 April 2004 Round 31	Basel	1–1	Zürich	St. Jakob-Park, Basel
16:00	Smiljanić 27' (1:1); D. Degen (yellow card) 60'	FCB summary FCZ summary	(yellow card) 13' Gygax; 22' (0:1) Petrosyan; (yellow card) 38' Filipescu; (yellow card) 45' Matić; (yellow card) 78' Nef; (yellow card) 90+2' Taini	Attendance: 27,842 (sold out); Referee: (Switzerland) René Rogalla (Wallisellen)
Note: Admission tickets were only available in advance, no ticket sales on entry. FCB without Ergic (recovering), as well as Rapo, Quennoz and Murat Yakin (all injured). FCZ without Abdi, Buess, Bastida and Stanic (all injured), and Keita (suspended). 15th minute: FCB goalkeeper Zuberbühler deflected a shot from Gygax onto the post. 30th minute, FCZ midfielder Muff left the pitch due to groin trouble.

2 May 2004 Round 32	Thun	0–2	Basel	Stadion Lachen, Thun
16:15	Deumi (yellow card) 53'; Hodžić (yellow card) 83'	FCB summary	10' (0:1) Chipperfield; 23' (0:2) P. Degen; (yellow card) 33' Delgado	Attendance: 10,055 (stadium record); Referee: (Switzerland) Reto Rutz (Amriswil)
Note: Thun without Milicevic, Kobel and Gerber (all injured). FCB without Yakin, Ergic and Atouba (all injured). 9th minute, a header from Zwyssig hit the crossbar. 30th minute, a shot from Chipperfield hit the post. 36th minute Thun's dos Santos was substitued out injured. 60th minute, five-minute stoppage in play after FCB fans swarmed over the barriers.

8 May 2004 Round 33	Basel	0–0	St. Gallen	St. Jakob-Park, Basel
19:30	Giménez (yellow card) 53'; Giménez (penalty missed) 59′ Chipperfield (yellow card) 88'	FCB summary	(yellow card) 77' Merenda	Attendance: 25,403; Referee: (Switzerland) Urs Meier (Wettingen and Würenlos)
Note: FCB without Zwyssig (injured) and Ergic (recovering). St. Gallen without Jairo (suspended), as well as Balmer, Barnetta, Bättig, Sutter and Longo (all injured). 47th minute: a shot from Atouba hit the post. 59th minute: Gimenez missed a penalty awarded following a foul by shooting the ball wide. The one point for FCB was enough for the team to secure the championship title.

12 May 2004 Round 34	Xamax	3–1	Basel	Stade de la Maladière, Neuchâtel
19:30	Griffiths (yellow card) 64'; Rey 69' (1:1); Forschelet (yellow card) 83'; Portillo (yellow card) 84'; Forschelet 90' (2:1); M'Futi 90+3' (3:1)	FCB summary	(yellow card) 45' Tum; 59' (0:1) Smiljanić; (yellow card) 64' Atouba	Attendance: 8,200; Referee: (Switzerland) Markus Nobs (Wohlen bei Bern)
Note: Xamax without Barea (suspended), and Bettoni, Daffe, Leroy, Wiederkehr, Nsilulu and Mangane (all injured). FCB without Ergic (recovering) and Chipperfield (on vacation). The opening kick was taken by national ice hockey player Sandy Jeannin. Before the match, the Basel players were presented with flowers in recognition of their championship title. 18th minute, a shot from Tum hit the post. 19th minute, a shot from Hassli hit the crossbar. 21st minute, a shot from Cantaluppi hit the post.

16 May 2004 Round 35	Grasshoppers	0–2	Basel	Hardturm, Zürich
16:15	Gane (red card) 39'; Mitreski (yellow card) 59'; Shala (yellow card) 78'; Salatić (yellow card) 59'	FCB summary	28' (0:1) Duruz; 33' (0:2) Rossi; (red card) 37' D. Degen; 84' Barberis	Attendance: 11,900; Referee: (Switzerland) Carlo Bertolini (Vira-Gambarogno)
Note: GC without Lichtsteiner (suspended), as well as Castillo, Eduardo, Gamboa, Petric, Schwegler, Tararache, Magro, Cabanas and Alfred (all injured). FCB without Atouba and Tum (both suspended), Chipperfield (on vacation), Ergic (recovering), Huggel and Zuberbühler (given the weekend off), and coach Christian Gross (scouting players in Argentina). His assistant coach Fritz Schmid stood on the line. Both sending-offs were due to these players being involved in aggresive scuffels. 76th minute: a shot from Nuñez hit the post.

22 May 2004 Round 36	Basel	2–1	Young Boys	St. Jakob-Park, Basel
20:15	Rossi 5' (1:0); Cantaluppi (yellow card) 10'; Giménez 36' (2:0)	FCB summary	47' (2:1) Chapuisat	Attendance: 29,541 (sold out); Referee: (Switzerland) Philippe Leuba (Chexbres)
Note: Admission tickets were only available in advance, no ticket sales on entry. The stadium was not entirely full, even though all tickets had been sold. FCB were without David Degen (suspended) as well as Atouba and Chipperfield (both away with their national teams). YB without Friedli, Sermeter, Patrick, Berisha and Giallanza (all injured). Before the match, FCB players Duruz, Tum and Guerrero were given a standing ovation in advance of their leaving the club. In the 68th minute, a shot from Delgado hit the post. 85th minute, Ivan Ergić substituted in to make his first partial appearance after more than a year and a half absence, because he had injured himself. After operations on both groins, he also fell ill with glandular fever. He missed the rest of the season and the entire of this season, with the exception of this one match at the end of the season.

==== Final league table ====
Pos	Team	Pld	W	D	L	GF	GA	GD	Pts	Qualification or relegation
1	Basel	36	26	7	3	86	32	+54	85	Swiss champions qualification to Champions League third qualifying round
2	Young Boys	36	22	6	8	75	48	+27	72	qualification to Champions League second qualifying round
3	Servette	36	15	7	14	61	62	−1	52	qualification to UEFA Cup second qualifying round
4	Zürich	36	14	8	14	58	52	+6	50	
5	St. Gallen	36	14	8	14	54	57	−3	50	
6	Thun	36	13	10	13	51	57	−6	49	entered Intertoto Cup first round
7	Grasshopper	36	12	5	19	62	74	−12	41	
8	Aarau	36	9	11	16	57	69	−12	38	
9	Xamax	36	10	6	20	46	63	−17	36	qualification to relegation play-off
10	Wil	36	7	8	21	37	73	−36	29	relegated to Swiss Challenge League; Swiss Cup winners qualification to UEFA Cup second qualifying round

Source: RSSSF
Rules for classification: 1) points; 2) goal difference; 3) number of goals scored.

=== Swiss Cup ===
19 September 2003 Round 1	FC Alle	1–5	Basel	Stade des Prés Domont (Centre Sportif Régional), Alle, Switzerland
20:15	Tabriche 37' (1:3)	FCB summary	8' (0:1) Zwyssig; 19' (0:2) Huggel; 21' (0:3) Rossi; 38' (1:4) Rossi; 55' (1:5) Huggel	Attendance: 4,000; Referee: (Switzerland) Claudio Circhetta (Muttenz)
Note: FCB without Atouba and Esposito (both injured), Ergic and Streller (both ill), as well as Hakan Yakin (recovering) and Murat Yakin (rested). Fair game, no yellow cards.

19 October 2003 Round 2	Urania Genève Sport	1–4	Basel	Stade des Trois-Chênes, Thônex
16:15	Gabzcyl (yellow card) 51'; Ballon (yellow card) 75'; Rahali (penalty missed) 80′ Gabzcyl 90' (1:4)	FCB summary	7' (0:1) Zwyssig; 15' (0:2) Rossi; 19' (0:3) Esposito; 44' (0:4) Quennoz	Attendance: 3,259; Referee: (Switzerland) Bruno Grossen
Note: FCB without Huggel, Gimenez and Delgado (all injured), Murat Yakin and Hakan Yakin (both rested), and Ergic (long-term illness). In the 80th minute, Rahali failed to convert a penalty —awarded following a foul— as FCB goalkeeper Zuberbühler held. Lyon’s Brazilien World Cup winner Edmilson took the kick-off. Alinghi boss Ernesto Bertarelli was among the spectators.

9 November 2003 Round 3	Grasshoppers	1–0	Basel	Hardturm, Zürich
14:30	Petrić (yellow card); Eduardo 63' (1:0); Opabunmi (yellow card) 83'	FCB summary	(yellow card) 22' Atouba; (yellow card) 24' Streller; (yellow card) 61' D. Degen; (yellow card) 79' Chipperfield	Attendance: 13,100; Referee: (Switzerland) Markus Nobs (Wohlen bei Bern)
Note: GC without Gamboa, Shala, Tararache, and Castillo (all injured); FCB without Esposito, Tum, Cantaluppi, and Delgado (all injured), and Ergic (long-term illness).

GC continued their way through the cup competition am/nd reached the final, which was played at the St. Jakob-Park in Basel. However, in the final they were beaten 3–2 by FC Wil and they qualified for the UEFA Cup second qualifying round.

=== UEFA Cup ===
==== First round ====
24 September 2003 1st Leg	Malatyaspor (Turkey)	0–2	(Switzerland) Basel	Malatya İnönü Stadium, Malatya
20:00	Akagünduz (yellow card) 25'	UEFA report FCB summary	15' (0:1) M. Yakin; (yellow card) 51' M. Yakin; (yellow card) 71' Zuberbühler; 75' (0:2) H. Yakin	Attendance: 10,000 (sold out); Referee: (Italy) Marian Mircea Salomir (Rom)
Note: Malatyaspor without Mkalele (injured). FCB without Gimenez and Atouba (both injured), as well as Esposito and Ergic (both recovering).

15 October 2003 2nd Leg	Basel (Switzerland)	1–2	(Turkey) Malatyaspor	St. Jakob-Park, Basel
19:30	Huggel (yellow card) 16'; Streller 95' (1:2); Chipperfield (yellow card) 105'	UEFA report FCB summary	(yellow card) 25' Birlik; 65' (0:1) Koçak; 85' (0:2) Koçak; (yellow card) 93' Bensol; (yellow card) 102' De-Azevedo	Attendance: 26,663; Referee: (Hungary) Attila Juhos
Note: FCB without Gimenez and Delgado (both injured), Ergic (long-term illness), and Claudino and Smiljanic (not in the squad); Malatyaspor without Mkelele and Mehmed (both injured). 51st minute, a shot from Fazli hit the post. 71st minute, a shot from Muhammed hit the post. Match ended after the first period of extra time (Silver Goal)!

Aggregate: 3–2 / Basel win on silver goal

==== Second round ====
6 November 2003 1st Leg	Basel (Switzerland)	2–3	(England) Newcastle United	St. Jakob-Park, Basel
20:30	Cantaluppi 11' (1:0); Chipperfield 15' (2:1); P. Degen (yellow card) 29'	UEFA report FCB summary	13' (1:1) Robert; 37' (2:2) Bramble; 75' (2:3) Ameobi	Attendance: 30,000 (sold out); Referee: (Norway) Tom Henning Øvrebø
Note: FCB without Ergic (long-term illness) as well as Delgado, Esposito, Tum and Duruz (all injured). Newcastle without Bowyer (suspended) as well as Dyer, Woodgate and Bellamy (all injured). 41st minute: a header from Gimenez hit the post.

27 November 2003 2nd Leg	Newcastle United (England)	1–0	(Switzerland) Basel	St James' Park, Newcastle upon Tyne
20:30	Shearer (yellow card) 1'; Smiljanić 14' (o.g.)	UEFA report FCB summary	(yellow card) 27' Cantaluppi	Attendance: 45,000; Referee: (Denmark) Knud Erik Fisker
Note: Newcastle without Bowyer (suspended) and Bellamy (injured).FCB without Huggel (stomach upset), Murat Yakin, Gimenez, Delgado and Esposito (all injured), as well as Ergic (long-term illness). 52nd minute, a shot from Hakan Yakin hit the post.

Aggregate: Newcastle win 4–2 on aggregate

== Sources ==
- Rotblau: Jahrbuch Saison 2015/2016. Publisher: FC Basel Marketing AG. ISBN 978-3-7245-2050-4
- Rotblau: Jahrbuch Saison 2017/2018. Publisher: FC Basel Marketing AG. ISBN 978-3-7245-2189-1
- Die ersten 125 Jahre / 2018. Publisher: Josef Zindel im Friedrich Reinhardt Verlag, Basel. ISBN 978-3-7245-2305-5
- Season 2003–04 at "Basler Fussballarchiv” homepage
- Switzerland 2003–04 at RSSSF
