= Philipp Degen =

Swiss footballer (born 1983)

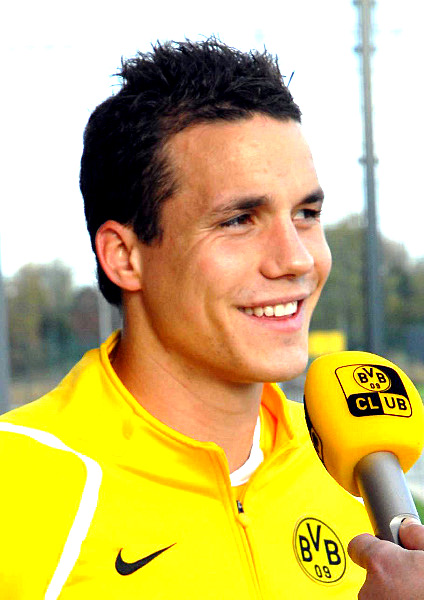
- Degen with Borussia Dortmund in 2007

Personal information
- Full name: Philipp Degen
- Date of birth: 15 February 1983 (age 43)
- Place of birth: Liestal, Switzerland
- Height: 1.85 m (6 ft 1 in)
- Positions: Right back; right winger

Youth career
- 1987–1995: FC Oberdorf
- 1995–2001: Basel

Senior career*
Years	Team	Apps	(Gls)
2001–2005	Basel	82	(4)
2005–2008	Borussia Dortmund	68	(1)
2008–2011	Liverpool	7	(0)
2010–2011	→ VfB Stuttgart (loan)	5	(0)
2011–2016	Basel	76	(7)
Total		238	(12)

International career
2001	Switzerland U-17	5	(0)
2001	Switzerland U-19	2	(0)
2002–2003	Switzerland U-20	4	(0)
2003–2004	Switzerland U-21	14	(0)
2005–2009	Switzerland	32	(0)
- * Club domestic league appearances and goals

Philipp Degen (Swiss Standard German pronunciation: [ˈfiː.lɪp ˈdeː.gən]; born 15 February 1983) is a retired Swiss professional footballer. Degen was usually a right back who could also play at left back or on the right wing. Degen reached the last 16 in the 2006 World Cup with Switzerland and was selected again for Euro 2008 but did not play any games.

He began his professional career at the local Swiss club FC Basel, playing four seasons in the first team before moving to Borussia Dortmund. He spent three years at the German club, his last season being marred by injury. Degen signed for Liverpool on a free transfer on 3 July 2008, his stay at Liverpool was also marred by many injuries. His Liverpool contract was terminated by mutual consent on 31 August 2011 and he returned to Basel. Degen ended his professional career at the end of season 2015/16 with a total of eight Swiss championship titles.

== Club career ==
=== Basel ===
Degen played his youth football, together with his twin brother David, with local amateur club FC Oberdorf. In the summer of 1995, they moved to the youth department of FC Basel, playing in their U-18 and U-21 teams. Philipp Degen advanced to Basel's first team for their 2001–02 season under head coach Christian Gross. Basel played in the 2001 UEFA Intertoto Cup. After playing in five test games, Degen played his team debut coming in as substitute in the away game on 8 July 2001 as Basel won 2–0 against Grindavík. After playing in two further test games, he played his first Swiss Cup game in the away game on 10 November as Basel won 5–0 against local club Concordia. He was substituted in the 54th minute for Mario Cantaluppi, who had suffered a knee injury. Degen played his domestic league debut with the team in the home game in the St. Jakob-Park on 2 December as Basel were defeated 4–5 by Grasshopper Club. Basel started well into the second part of the season and during this period FCB played their best football, pulling away at the top of the table and subsequently achieved the championship title prematurely. Basel won the last game of the season, on 8 May 2002, and became champions ten points clear at the top of the table. Just four days later they played in the cup final against Grasshopper Club winning 2–1 in extra time and they won the double.

In his second season with the team Degen came to more playing practice, because right back Massimo Ceccaroni had retired from active football. Basel ended their league season as runners-up, but in the cup they advanced to the final and here they beat Xamax 6–0 to defend the title that they had won a season earlier.

As cup winners Basel were qualified for the UEFA Cup first round and here they beat Malatyaspor 3-2 on aggregate due to the silver goal rule. However, in the second round they lost both games against Newcastle United. Degen played in all four matches. In their 2003–04 season Degen became regular starter and scored his first goal for the team in the home game in the St. Jakob-Park on 26 July 2003. It was the first goal of the game as Basel won 4–2 against Xamax. The team started well into the 2003–04 league season, winning their first 13 matches straight out. The first defeat came on matchday 24. Basel won the championship with 26 victories and seven draws, the team had suffered just three away defeats, and obtained 85 points. Degen played in 32 of the 36 matches. However in the cup they were eliminated early, in round three.

As reigning Swiss champions, Basel entered 2004–05 UEFA Champions League in the third qualifying round, however, drawn against Internazionale, who won the qualifier 5–2 on aggregate. Basel subsequently dropped into the 2004–05 UEFA Cup. Beating Terek Grozny in the first round, Basel qualified for the group stage. A 1–1 draw away against Schalke 04 was followed by a home defeat against Hearts. But with two victories, 2–1 away against Ferencvárosi TC and 1–0 at home against Feyenoord, saw Basel rise to third place in the group table and advance to the knock-out stage. In the round of 32 in the 2004–05 UEFA Cup, a home game in the St. Jakob-Park on 17 February 2005, Basel played a goalless draw against Lille OSC, but the return leg was defeated 2–0 and were eliminated. Degen played in all ten European matches. Basel completed all the 2004–05 Super League season's seventeen home games undefeated, winning thirteen and drawing four. They ended the season as Swiss champions with 10 points advantage over second placed Thun.

In the first four seasons of his senior career Degen made 82 first team appearances in the Swiss Football League scoring four goals. Over this four-year period, he claimed three league titles and one domestic cup with Basel.

=== Borussia Dortmund ===
Degen was then signed by Borussia Dortmund of the German Bundesliga and in three seasons at the club he made 68 first team appearances, scoring one goal. Degen's last season at Dortmund the 2007–08 season was marred by injury as he only made 16 first team appearances.

=== Liverpool ===
On 3 July 2008, Degen signed a four-year contract with Liverpool after a bosman free transfer. Liverpool manager Rafael Benítez described him as "an offensive player with great energy and a winning mentality. His strength is going forward and I am confident he will be prove to be a quality addition to our squad." On his move to Liverpool, Degen said

"The move is a challenge for me because Liverpool are not just any club. They play every year for the title and the Champions League so it is clear to me that it's not easy to get through to the team. All the positions at Liverpool are occupied by two or three players already. But my playing style suits the Premier League, where the football is played moving forward."

Degen made his Liverpool debut on 12 July 2008 as a half-time substitute in a friendly against Tranmere Rovers which they won 1–0. Degen made his competitive Liverpool debut in the third round of the Football League Cup in the 2–1 home win against Crewe Alexandra, during which he broke two of his ribs and punctured his lung in a collision with teammate Sami Hyypiä and was out for two months.

On 12 November 2008, he made his first-team comeback in the 4–2 League Cup defeat at Spurs, only to suffer a broken metatarsal. Degen was quoted after the game. "This is the worst thing that has ever happened to me," ... "I simply burst into tears in the dressing-room. Tottenham's Gareth Bale made a bad challenge on me, and I did not even get a penalty. But the bone in my foot is torn apart, and I will be out another four to six weeks. It is the saddest event of my life – I keep asking myself if I did something wrong in a past life."

In January 2009, Degen suffered another metatarsal injury after scoring in a 2–2 draw with Manchester United reserves. On 9 May 2009, he returned to the Liverpool first team as an unused substitute in Liverpool's 3–0 victory against West Ham at Upton Park.

After 14 months into his Anfield career, Degen made his league debut in the 4–0 win over Burnley on 12 September 2009, coming on as a substitute for Glen Johnson at the hour mark.

On 22 September 2009, Degen started in Liverpool's 1–0 League Cup win against Leeds United at Elland Road. In the next round of the same competition, he started against Arsenal in a 2–1 defeat for Liverpool. Degen got his first Premier League start in an away match against Fulham on 31 October 2009, in place of the injured Glen Johnson. He was subsequently sent off for a foul on Clint Dempsey in the 79th minute of the 3–1 defeat. Following another injury to Glen Johnson, Degen featured more in the Liverpool team, both at right back and on the right of midfield. After a 2–0 defeat of Tottenham Hotspur, Degen expressed his pleasure with the win and his performance, saying "I think I can improve a lot. I haven't had the best of luck with injuries during my time with Liverpool and I know there is still more to come from me. I have only played at around 60 per cent of my potential and hope I can show much, much more.". On 10 February 2010, Degen started the game against Arsenal at the Emirates Stadium. On 19 April 2010, Degen played the last 13 minutes of the home 3–0 win versus West Ham United at Anfield.

=== Stuttgart ===
On 21 July 2010, Liverpool manager Roy Hodgson announced that Degen was free to look for a new club after a meeting between the pair and on 8 August 2010 it was announced that Degen was loaned out to VfB Stuttgart until the end of the season. He made just five appearances for Stuttgart.

=== Return to Basel ===
On 31 August 2011, Liverpool announced the release of Degen. Just a short time later, he made the request to the then Basel manager Thorsten Fink if he could keep fit with his home club's first team. Fink left the club in October 2011 and the new manager Heiko Vogel offered him a contract on 20 November 2011.

Following his return he played his first game in the 2011 Swiss Cup tie against FC Wil. He scored the equaliser to 2–2 as Basel won 3–2 aet. He played is first league match in St. Jakob Park on 3 December 2011 in the 1–0 home victory against FC Luzern. At the end of the 2011–12 season, Degen won the Double, the League Championship title and the Swiss Cup with Basel. At the end of the Swiss Super League season 2012–13 Degen won the Championship title and was Swiss Cup runner up with Basel. In the 2012–13 UEFA Europa League Basel advanced to the semi-finals, there being matched against the reigning UEFA Champions League holders Chelsea, but they were beaten 2–5 on aggregate. At the end of the 2013–14 Super League season Degen won his sixth league championship with Basel. They also reached the final of the 2013–14 Swiss Cup, but were beaten 2–0 by Zürich after extra time. In the 2013–14 Champions League season Basel in the group stage finished the group in third position to qualify for Europa League knockout phase and here they advanced as far as the quarter-finals.

The season 2014–15 was a very successful one for Basel. The championship was won for the sixth time in a row that season and in the 2014–15 Swiss Cup they reached the final. But for the third season in a row, they finished as runners-up, losing 0–3 to Sion in the final. Basel entered the Champions League in the group stage and reached the knockout phase as on 9 December 2014 they managed a 1–1 draw at Anfield against Liverpool. But then Basel then lost to Porto in the Round of 16. Basel played a total of 65 matches (36 Swiss League fixtures, 6 Swiss Cup, 8 Champions League and 15 test matches). Under trainer Paulo Sousa Degen totaled 33 appearances, 18 League, 2 Cup, 1 Champions League, as well 12 in test games.

Under trainer Urs Fischer Degen won the Swiss Super League championship at the end of the 2015–16 Super League season for the eighth time, his fifth time in a row. For the club it was the seventh title in a row and their 19th championship title in total.

At the end of the 2015–16 FC Basel season Philipp Degen ended his football career and retired from professional football. Between the years 2001 to 2005 and again from 2011 to 2016 Degen played a total of 333 games for Basel scoring a total of 18 goals. 158 of these games were in the Swiss Super League, 22 in the Swiss Cup, 39 were in a UEFA European-competitions (Champions League, UEFA Cup, Europa League and UIC) and 114 were friendly games. He scored eleven goals in the domestic league, one in the cup, one in the Champions League and the other five were scored during the test games. During his career with FCB Degen won the Swiss championship eight times and the domestic cup twice.

== International career ==
Degen has represented Switzerland at various age levels including Under-17s, Under-19s, Under-20s and Under-21s. Degen made his Swiss U-17s debut on 10 February in the 2–1 away win against the Turkish U-17s. His U-21s debut was on 20 August 2003 in the 1–1 home draw against the French national under-21 football team.

Degen played for the Swiss team in the 2006 FIFA World Cup, until they were knocked out on penalties by Ukraine in the last 16. Despite having been injured for much of the season, Degen formed part of the Swiss squad for the UEFA Euro 2008 tournament. However, the host nation were knocked out in the group stage of the tournament and Degen did not make any appearances. He has not been called up to the team since Ottmar Hitzfeld took over as the new manager due to his preference to play younger players like Stephan Lichtsteiner and Valon Behrami. He played his last game for the Swiss national team in the 0–1 defeat against Norway on 14 November 2009.

== Personal life ==
His twin brother, David, was also a footballer and has played for FC Basel too. David retired at the end of the 2013/14 season.

== Career statistics ==
Appearances and goals by club, season and competition
Club	Season	League			Cup		Europe		Other		Total	
Club	Season	Division	Apps	Goals	Apps	Goals	Apps	Goals	Apps	Goals	Apps	Goals
Basel	2001–02	Swiss Super League	2	0	1	0			1	0	4	0
Basel	2002–03	Swiss Super League	13	0			1	0	3	0	17	0
Basel	2003–04	Swiss Super League	32	4	3	0	4	0	–		39	4
Basel	2004–05	Swiss Super League	32	0	3	0	10	0	–		45	0
Basel	Total		79	4	7	0	15	0	4	0	105	4
FC Aarau (on loan)	2002–03	Swiss Football League	16	0			–		–		16	0
FC Aarau (on loan)	Total		16	0	0	0	0	0	0	0	16	0
Borussia Dortmund	2005–06	Bundesliga	31	1	1	0	2	0	–		34	1
Borussia Dortmund	2006–07	Bundesliga	27	0	2	0	–		–		29	0
Borussia Dortmund	2007–08	Bundesliga	10	0	2	0	–		–		12	0
Borussia Dortmund	Total		68	1	5	0	2	0	0	0	75	1
Liverpool	2008–09	Premier League	0	0	2	0	0	0	–		2	0
Liverpool	2009–10	Premier League	7	0	3	0	1	0	–		11	0
Liverpool	Total		7	0	5	0	1	0	0	0	13	0
VfB Stuttgart	2010–11	Bundesliga	5	0	1	0	3	0	–		9	0
VfB Stuttgart	Total		5	0	1	0	3	0	0	0	9	0
Basel	2011–12	Swiss Super League	9	1	2	1	1	0	–		12	2
Basel	2012–13	Swiss Super League	21	3	3	0	10	0	–		34	3
Basel	2013–14	Swiss Super League	20	3	4	0	9	1	–		33	4
Basel	2014–15	Swiss Super League	18	0	2	0	1	0	–		21	0
Basel	2015–16	Swiss Super League	8	0	2	0	1	0	–		11	0
Basel	Total		76	7	13	1	22	1	0	0	111	9
Career total			251	12	31	1	43	1	4	0	329	14

== Honours ==
FC Basel

- Swiss Super League: 2001–02, 2003–04, 2004–05, 2011–12, 2012–13, 2013–14, 2014–15, 2015–16
- Swiss Cup: 2002–03, 2011–12
- Swiss Cup runner up: 2012–13, 2013–14, 2014–15
- Uhren Cup: 2013
