= Johnny Leoni =

Swiss footballer (born 1984)

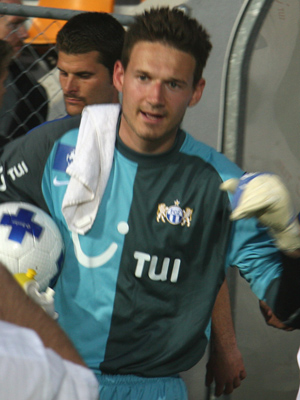

Personal information
- Date of birth: 30 June 1984 (age 42)
- Place of birth: Sion, Switzerland
- Height: 1.89 m (6 ft 2 in)
- Position: Goalkeeper

Youth career
- 1992–2001: Sion

Senior career*
Years	Team	Apps	(Gls)
2001–2003	Sion	30	(0)
2003–2012	FC Zürich	158	(0)
2012–2013	Omonia	3	(0)
2013	→ Neftchi Baku (loan)	0	(0)
2013–2014	Marítimo	6	(0)
2014–2016	Le Mont	12	(0)
2016	AC Nagano Parceiro	15	(0)
2017–2018	Tochigi SC	50	(0)
Total		274	(0)

International career
2010–2011	Switzerland	1	(0)
- * Club domestic league appearances and goals

Johnny Leoni (born 30 June 1984) is a Swiss former professional footballer who played as a goalkeeper.

== Career ==
Leoni joined FC Zürich in May 2003, but did not become their first-choice keeper until the 2005–06 season when he took over from Davide Taini.

He saved three penalty kicks in the penalty shootout in the quarterfinal of the Swiss Cup against FC Aarau.

His achievements were noticed by Ottmar Hitzfeld and he was included in four squads for the Swiss national team without making an appearance. Leoni earned his first cap for the Swiss on 10 August 2011 after coming on as a second-half substitute in a 2–1 win over Liechtenstein in a friendly match. He had previously been part of their 2010 FIFA World Cup squad but did not feature.

Leoni joined AC Omonia for the 2012–13 season after he agreed terms with the club in the January transfer window. He commented that, in order to join Omonia, he sacrificed a position in the national team of Switzerland. He played three matches in the league and two matches in the UEFA Europa League. He also won the Supercup of Cyprus.

In February 2013 Leoni joined Azerbaijan Premier League side Neftchi Baku on loan till the end of the season.

== Club statistics ==
As of 23 February 2017

Club performance			League		Cup		Total	
Season	Club	League	Apps	Goals	Apps	Goals	Apps	Goals
Japan			League		Emperor's Cup		Total	
2016	Nagano Parceiro	J3 League	15	0	1	0	16	0
Total			15	0	1	0	16	0

== Honours ==
FC Zürich

- Swiss Super League: 2006, 2007, 2009
- Swiss Cup: 2005

AC Omonia

- Cyprus FA Shield: 2012

Tochigi SC

- 2017 promotion to J2
