= Rosemir Pires =

Brazilian footballer

Personal information
- Full name: Rosemir Pires dos Santos
- Date of birth: 25 July 1978 (age 48)
- Place of birth: São Paulo, Brazil
- Height: 1.89 m (6 ft 2 1/2 in)
- Position: Defender

Senior career*
| Years | Team | Apps | (Gls) |
| 1999 | Nacional de Patos | | |
| 1999 | KFC Uerdingen 05 | 9 | (0) |
| 2000–2002 | Göttingen 05 | 19 | (2) |
| 2003 | SFC Opava | 5 | (1) |
| 2004–2005 | Wil | 43 | (4) |
| 2006–2008 | Schaffhausen | 40 | (2) |
| 2008–2009 | Portuguesa Londrinense | | |
- * Club domestic league appearances and goals

Rosemir Pires dos Santos (born 25 July 1978) is a Brazilian former football defender.

His clubs have included SFC Opava in the Czech Republic and FC Wil in Switzerland. He joined Schaffhausen on 28 January 2006, and played only once in Challenge League 2007–08 season.
