= Krešimir Stanić =

Swiss footballer (born 1985)

Personal information
- Full name: Krešimir Stanić
- Date of birth: 6 March 1985 (age 41)
- Height: 1.81 m (5 ft 11 1/2 in)

Senior career*
Years	Team	Apps	(Gls)
2003–2006	FC Zurich	38	(5)

International career^{‡}
?–2006	Switzerland U-21	2	(0)
- * Club domestic league appearances and goals as of 21 March 2007 ‡ National team caps and goals as of 21 July 2006

Krešimir Stanić (born 6 March 1985) is a retired Swiss footballer of Croatian descent. He spent his entire playing career as a forward for FC Zurich in the Swiss Super League. He was forced to retire in 2006 due to a serious leg injury that he sustained in a car crash. Following his retirement, Stanić, who was speeding and driving under the influence at the time of the crash, was a prominent safe driving campaigner in Zürich, but he lost his position after being caught speeding. He currently works as a youth coach at FC Zurich.
