= Maximiliano Flotta =

Argentine footballer and coach

Personal information
- Full name: Maximiliano Rubén Flotta
- Date of birth: 28 December 1978 (age 47)
- Place of birth: Buenos Aires, Argentina
- Positions: Defender; midfielder

Senior career*
| Years | Team | Apps | (Gls) |
| 1998–2000 | Arsenal de Sarandí | | |
| 2000–2002 | Tigre | | |
| 2002–2003 | Los Andes | | |
| 2003–2004 | Vélez Sársfield | 18 | (1) |
| 2004–2007 | Unión Magdalena | | |
| 2005 | → Deportivo Alavés (loan) | 2 | (0) |
| 2005 | → Deportes Tolima (loan) | 7 | (0) |
| 2006 | → Atlético Huila (loan) | 5 | (0) |
| 2006 | → Club Almagro (loan) | | |
| 2008–2010 | Independiente Santa Fe | 60 | (2) |
| 2010–2011 | Patronato | 9 | (0) |
| 2011 | Club Atlético Nueva Chicago | 0 | (0) |
| 2012–2013 | Fortaleza | 20 | (0) |
- * Club domestic league appearances and goals

Maximiliano Rubén Flotta (born 28 December 1978) is an Argentine retired footballer who is the assistant coach of Fortaleza.

== Career ==
Flotta formerly played in Argentina for Arsenal de Sarandí, Tigre, Los Andes, Vélez Sársfield and Club Almagro, in Colombia for Unión Magdalena, Atlético Huila, Deportes Tolima and Club Santa Fe, and in Spain for Deportivo Alavés.
