= Oerlikon =

Oerlikon may refer to:

== Companies ==
- OC Oerlikon (former Unaxis), a Swiss technology conglomerate, or one of its business units:
  - Oerlikon Solar
  - Oerlikon Balzers
  - Oerlikon Leybold Vacuum
- Oerlikon-Bührle, a company in Zürich, Switzerland that used to own Bally Shoe, Oerlikon Contraves, Pilatus Aircraft and Britten-Norman Aircraft; see Fairey Aviation Company
- Iso Oerlikon, a company in Menziken, Switzerland that specialices in welding technology products.
- Maschinenfabrik Oerlikon, the Oerlikon subsidiary later became Oerlikon-Bührle, and is now part of Asea Brown Boveri
- Oerlikon Contraves, a Swiss anti-aircraft artillery manufacturer founded in Zürich Oerlikon
  - Oerlikon KBA, a 25 mm cannon
  - Oerlikon KBD, an anti-aircraft cannon
  - Oerlikon 20 mm cannon, an anti-aircraft cannon
  - Oerlikon 35 mm twin cannon, an anti-aircraft cannon

== Other uses ==
- Oerlikon (Zurich), a district in the northern part of Zurich, Switzerland
- Zürich Oerlikon railway station located in Zurich
- Oerlikon, a world in M. A. Foster's "The Morphodite Trilogy"
