= Rogério (footballer, born 1980) =

Brazilian footballer (born 1980)

Personal information
- Full name: Rogério Luiz da Silva
- Date of birth: 12 June 1980 (age 46)
- Place of birth: Brazil
- Height: 1.82 m (5 ft 11 1/2 in)
- Position: Forward

Team information
- Current team: Grasshopper-Club Zurich
- Number: 28

Senior career*
Years	Team	Apps	(Gls)
2003–04	FC Wil	31	(5)
2004–2006	Grasshopper-Club Zurich	54	(15)
2006–2009	FC Aarau	77	(20)
2009–2010	Grasshopper-Club Zurich		
- * Club domestic league appearances and goals as of 4 June 2008

Rogério Luiz da Silva (born 12 June 1980), commonly known as Rogério, is a footballer from Brazil who since 2009 has played as a forward for Grasshopper-Club Zurich in the Swiss Super League.

== Career ==
After three seasons at FC Aarau, da Silva returned to Grasshopper-Club Zurich and has signed until June 2010. Rogério had previously played for Grasshopper-Club Zurich from 2004 to 2006.
