= Marc Schneider (footballer) =

Swiss footballer and manager (born 1980)

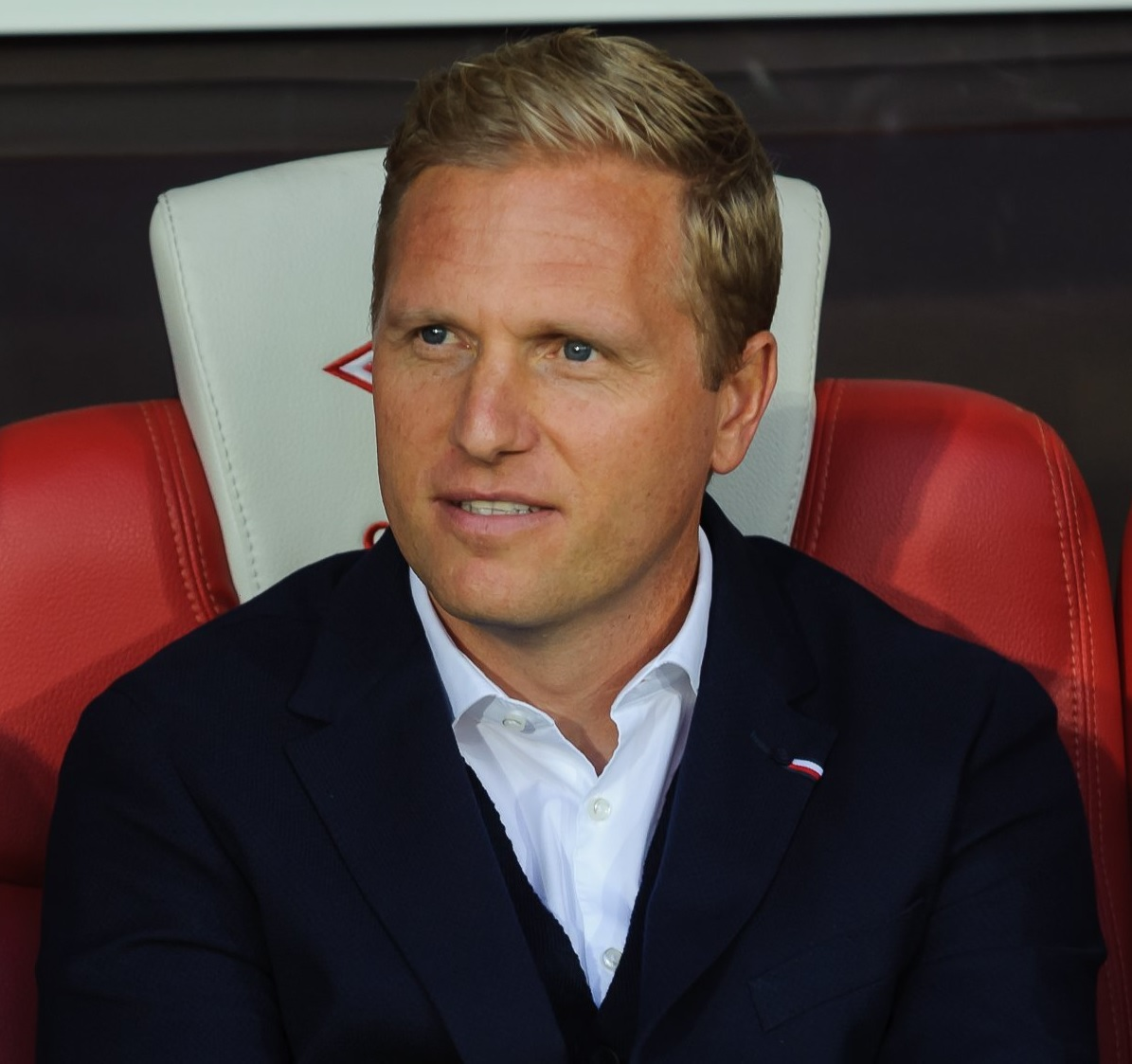
- Schneider coaching FC Thun in 2019

Personal information
- Date of birth: 23 July 1980 (age 46)
- Place of birth: Thun, Switzerland
- Height: 1.80 m (5 ft 11 in)
- Position: Defender

Senior career*
Years	Team	Apps	(Gls)
1998–2002	Thun	122	(4)
2002–2003	Zürich	7	(0)
2003–2004	Thun	32	(2)
2004–2007	Zürich	85	(6)
2007–2008	St. Gallen	12	(0)
2008–2010	Young Boys	35	(3)
2010–2012	Thun	38	(0)
Total		331	(15)

Managerial career
- 2015: Thun
- 2017–2020: Thun
- 2021–2022: Waasland-Beveren
- 2022: Greuther Fürth
- 2024–: Vaduz
- * Club domestic league appearances and goals

Marc Schneider (born 23 July 1980) is a Swiss professional football manager and former player, who played as defender. He is the current head coach of FC Vaduz.

== Playing career ==
Schneider was captain of the Swiss title-winning team of 2005–06 and part of the 2006–07 Swiss Championship winning team of FC Zürich. During his last spell at Zürich, he normally played at left back, with players such as Steve von Bergen and Hannu Tihinen preferred in the middle. After leaving the club, however, he moved back to his original position in the centre of defence.

== Managerial career ==
After his active career, Schneider stepped into the coaching profession and replaced Ciriaco Sforza as Thun's caretaker manager on 1 July 2015. He was in turn succeeded by Luxembourger Jeff Saibene. In 2017, he was reappointed as head coach of Thun. In December 2020, the club decided to dismiss him from his duties.

In June 2021, recently relegated Belgian First Division B club Waasland-Beveren announced that they had appointed Schneider as their new head coach, succeeding Nicky Hayen, who had not been able to keep the club at the highest level. He moved to manage Greuther Fürth in May 2022. He was sacked in October 2022.

On 15 February 2024, he was appointed as the new head coach of Liechtenstein's FC Vaduz, who play in the Swiss Challenge League.

== Honours ==
FC Zürich

- Swiss Cup: 2004–05
- Super League/Nationalliga A: 2005–06, 2006–07
