= Mario Schönenberger =

Swiss footballer (born 1986)

Personal information
- Date of birth: 18 May 1986 (age 40)
- Place of birth: Switzerland
- Height: 1.84 m (6 ft 0 in)
- Position: Midfielder

Youth career
- –2002: Wil

Senior career*
Years	Team	Apps	(Gls)
2002–2003	→ Bazenheid (loan)	18	(1)
2003–2006	Wil	57	(0)
2006–2009	Thun	43	(0)
2008	→ Kriens (loan)	12	(0)
2009–2012	Wil	72	(0)
2012–2014	St. Gallen	16	(0)
2014–	Wohlen	1	(0)
- * Club domestic league appearances and goals as of 14 January 2014

Mario Schönenberger (born 18 May 1986) is a Swiss professional footballer who currently plays for FC Wohlen.
