= Riccardo Meili =

Swiss footballer (born 1982)

Personal information
- Date of birth: 6 March 1982 (age 44)
- Place of birth: Aadorf, Switzerland
- Height: 1.91 m (6 ft 3 in)
- Position: Goalkeeper

Senior career*
Years	Team	Apps	(Gls)
1999–2001	SC Aadorf	22	(0)
2001	Frauenfeld	18	(0)
2002–2003	Basel	0	(0)
2003–2004	Concordia Basel	12	(0)
2004–2005	Wil	2	(0)
2005–2006	Basel	0	(0)
2006–2008	Concordia Basel	36	(0)
2008–2009	Panionios	1	(0)
2009	Vaduz	0	(0)
- * Club domestic league appearances and goals

Riccardo Meili (born 6 March 1982) is a former footballer from Switzerland who played as goalkeeper.

== Soccer career ==
Meili started his career at SC Aadorf in 1999. He made 22 appearances for the club during the 2 seasons he was there. He then signed for FC Frauenfeld in 2001 and played 19 times for the club before leaving for FC Basel during the January transfer window. He was at Basel from 2001 to 2003 as second and third-choice goalkeeper and he become for the first time swiss champion with FC Basel. His hunger for first-team football then led him across the city to FC Concordia Basel where he played 19 games in 2 years. After Concordia he had a short spell at FC Wil 1900, playing 2 games. Meili went back to FC Basel in 2005 where he once again saw no first-team action which led to him leaving for FC Concordia Basel for a second time, where he played 40 games in 2 years. In 2008, he joined Panionios F.C., an Athens-based club in Greece, where he signed a three-year contract. After leaving the club in February 2009, he signed on 20 June 2009 a contract with FC Vaduz and left the club on 30 June 2009 and he stopped his soccer career.

== Business career ==
In 2009 he started his private banking career at Credit Suisse, Switzerland's second biggest bank, where he stayed till April 2015.

In May 2015 he opened together with his Wife, Zahra Eram, Switzerland's most exclusive dental clinic called Eram Dental Health Clinc. After 7 years he expanded the business and opened in September 2022 the most exclusive orofacial clinic, The Eram Clinic.

== Personal ==
He is married to Zahra Eram, who together with her he founded worlds leading orofacial clinic, The Eram Clinic in Zurich, Switzerland. Together they have two kids.

Meili and his family reside mainly in Zurich, Switzerland.
