= Gérald Forschelet =

Tahitian-French footballer (born 1981)

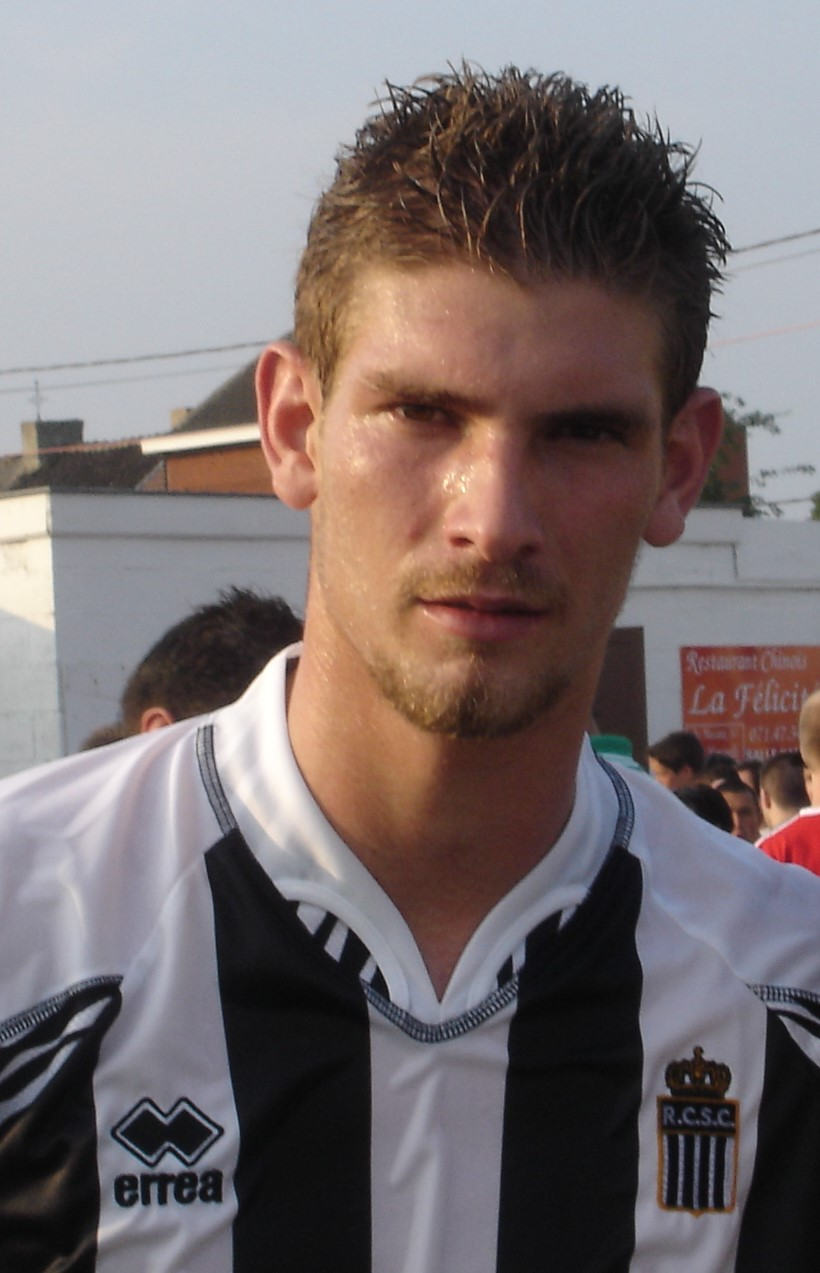

Personal information
- Full name: Gérald Forschelet
- Date of birth: 19 September 1981 (age 45)
- Place of birth: Papeete, Tahiti
- Height: 1.87 m (6 ft 2 in)
- Position: Defensive midfielder

Senior career*
Years	Team	Apps	(Gls)
1998–2002	Cannes	17	(1)
2002–2004	Bolton Wanderers	0	(0)
2003–2004	→ Neuchâtel Xamax (loan)	24	(6)
2004	Istres	2	(0)
2005	Neuchâtel Xamax	11	(0)
2005–2006	Charleroi	14	(1)
2007–2008	Assyriska	18	(2)
2008–2009	AFC Tubize	16	(0)
2010–2011	Cité Sport		
- * Club domestic league appearances and goals as of 2 April 2012

Gérald Forschelet (born 19 September 1981) is a Tahitian-French professional football player who plays as defensive midfielder.

== Career ==
=== Cannes ===
Forschelet started his career at Cannes on 1998, debuting for the team on 17 February 2001 in a Ligue 2 match against Montpellier. He played in other 6 matches in that season when the club was relegated to Championnat National. Playing at the 3rd tier of French football, Forschelet caught the attention of English club Bolton Wanderers and signed for the Premier League team in February 2002.

=== Bolton Wanderers ===
Forschelet never managed to get first team football at Bolton Wanderers after facing competition with players like Kevin Nolan, Per Frandsen, Iván Campo and Jay-Jay Okocha. Playing only for the reserve team during the whole 2002–03 season, the Tahitian left the club on loan for the whole 2003–04 season.

=== Neuchâtel Xamax ===
Arriving at Neuchâtel Xamax on loan, Forschelet managed to break into the first team with 24 appearances and 6 goals at Axpo Super League being used as right-midfielder and even as an attacking midfield. Upon his return, he was released from Bolton Wanderers and signed for French club FC Istres. Having limited play time due to injuries, Forschelet grabbed only two Ligue 1 appearances against Nantes and Lille before being released and returning to Neuchâtel Xamax where injuries once again hit the Tahitian midfielder who played the 90 minutes in only one of his 11 appearances.

=== Charleroi ===
Forschelet was transferred to Belgian Charleroi on 2005, after the club has finished 5th on 2004-05 Belgian First Division. He played 14 times for the Zèbres, scoring once.

=== Assyriska ===
In January 2007, Forschelet moved to Assyriska, which was recently relegated to Division 1, the 3rd tier of Swedish football, winning the competition the same year. However, his contract was not renewed after the club's promotion.

=== AFC Tubize ===
Forschelet signed on mid-2008 for AFC Tubize to play at the Belgian First Division. Forschelet appearance 16 times during AFC Tubize's first and only season at the top flight but could not avoid relegation. The Tahitian midfielder was released after the end of his contract.

=== Non-professional football ===
Forschelet had unsuccessful trials with Swedish clubs Åtvidabergs FF and Ljungskile SK before signing with Belgian low tier Cité Sport.
