= Stipe Matić =

Croatian footballer (born 1979)

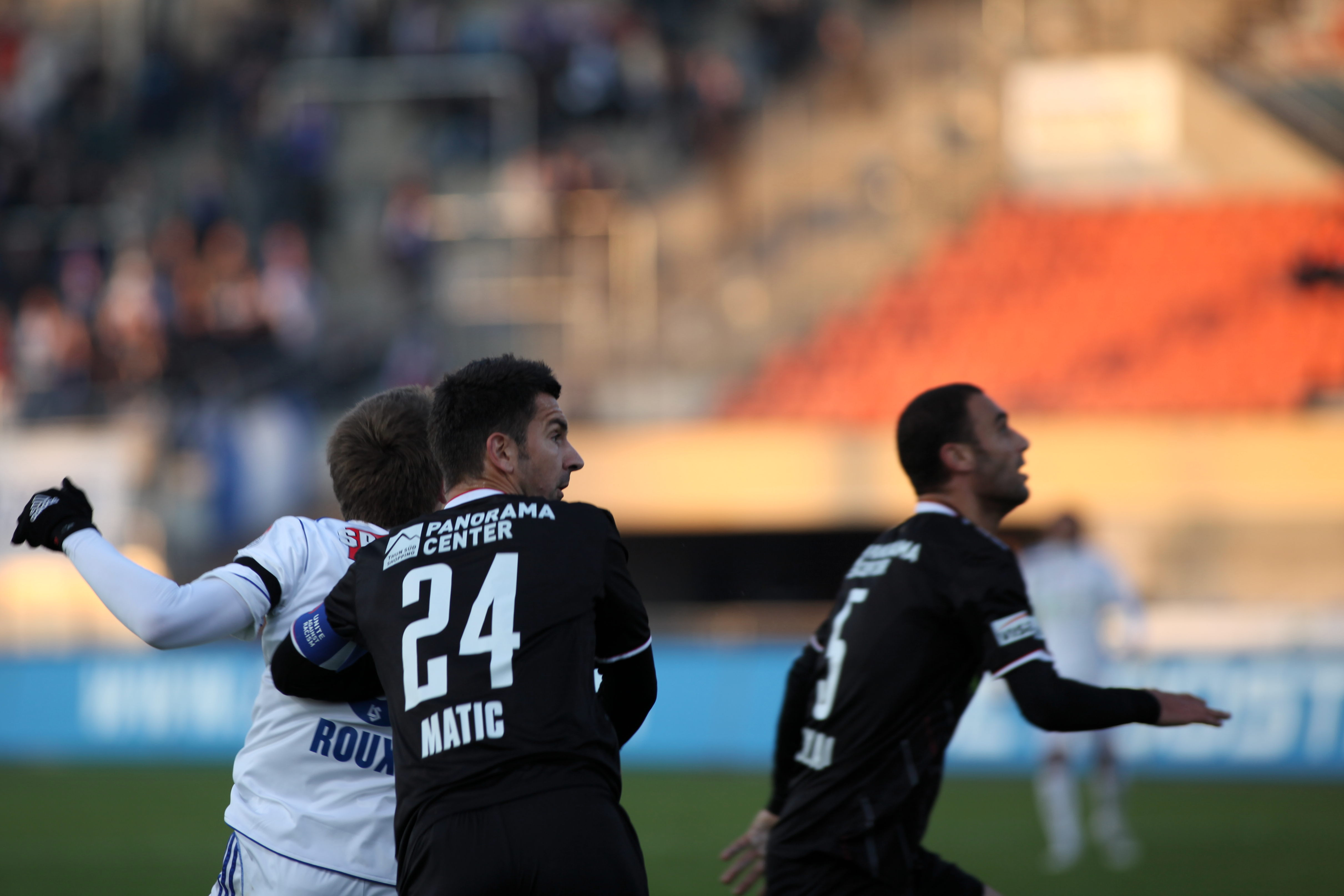

Personal information
- Date of birth: 6 February 1979 (age 47)
- Place of birth: Split, Croatia
- Height: 1.88 m (6 ft 2 in)
- Position: Defender

Youth career
- Hajduk Split

Senior career*
Years	Team	Apps	(Gls)
1998–2001	Hajduk Split	24	(0)
2001–2002	Vasas	1	(0)
2002–2003	Posušje	21	(6)
2003–2004	FC Zürich	22	(3)
2004–2005	Hapoel Be'er Sheva	17	(0)
2006	Górnik Zabrze	7	(0)
2006–2011	FC Wil	69	(5)
2011–2013	FC Thun	70	(6)
2013–2016	FC Naters	61	(3)
2017	Vevey Sports 05	7	(0)
- * Club domestic league appearances and goals

Stipe Matić (born 6 February 1979) is a Croatian former professional footballer who played as a defender.

== Club career ==
Matić began his playing career in the Croatian Prva HNL with Hajduk Split.

He played for Swiss sides FC Zürich, Wil, Thun, Naters and Vevey and after retiring as a player returned to FC Thun in 2017 to take charge of their U-16 team.

On 15 October 2026, Matić was appointed as manager of Czech National Football League club FK Arsenal Česká Lípa.
