= Davide Taini =

Swiss footballer (born 1976)

Personal information
- Full name: Davide Taini
- Date of birth: 7 December 1976 (age 49)
- Height: 1.90 m (6 ft 3 in)
- Position: Goalkeeper

Senior career*
Years	Team	Apps	(Gls)
1997–1999	Singen	52	(0)
1999–2001	FC Winterthur	46	(0)
2001–2006	FC Zürich	76	(0)
2006–2011	FC Wil	149	(0)
2011–2014	Grasshopper	11	(0)
- * Club domestic league appearances and goals as of 30 June 2014

Davide Taini (born 7 December 1976) is a retired Swiss association footballer.

At the end of the 2013–14 season, he retired from professional football at the age of 37.

== Honours ==
FC Zürich

- Swiss Cup: 2004–05
- Super League/Nationalliga A: 2005–06
