= 2004–05 FC Basel season =

FC Basel
2004–05 season
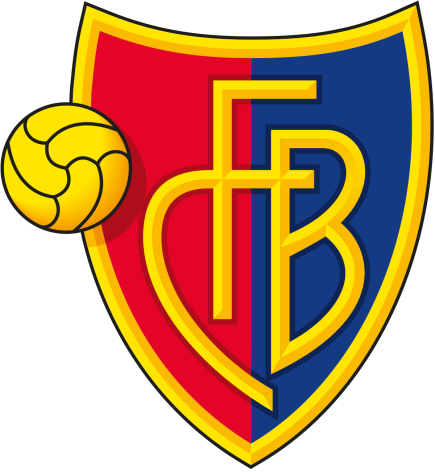
- Club president: Werner Edelmann
- Head coach: Christian Gross
- Stadium: St. Jakob-Park
- 2004–05 Super League: Champions
- 2004–05 Swiss Cup: Round 3
- 2004–05 Champions League: Third qualifying round
- 2004–05 UEFA Cup: Round of 32
- Top goalscorer: League: Christian Giménez (27); All: Christian Giménez (30)
- Highest home attendance: 31,383 vs Thun (07.05.2005)
- Lowest home attendance: League: 19,212 vs Schaffhausen (16.03.2005); All: 15,895 vs Terek Grozny (30.09.2004)

The 2004–05 season was Fussball Club Basel 1893's 112th in existence since their foundation in 1893 and the club's 11th consecutive season in the top flight of Swiss football since their promotion at the end of the 1993–94 season. FC Basel started the season off with various warm-up matches. These included teams from the Swiss lower league as well as teams from Lichtenstein, France and Germany. The FC Basel aims for the 2004–05 season were to defend their league title, to win the cup and as well as to qualify for the UEFA Champions League group stage.

== Overview ==
As reigning champions Basel were favourites to retain their title and as Swiss champions, they entered the UEFA Champions League in third qualifying round. Basel's biggest signing in advance of the 2004–05 season was Kléber from Hannover 96. But in the other direction the Cameroonian international Timothée Atouba and Swiss international Mario Cantaluppi left the club. During the winter break they signed Patrick Müller from Mallorca.

== The Campaign ==
=== Domestic League ===
The Swiss Football Association (ASF-SFV) had changed the format of the domestic league the previous season and this format called Swiss Super League remains unaltered this season. There were ten teams competing in the top tier 2004–05 Swiss Super League. The teams played a double round-robin in the first half of the season and then another double round-robin in the second half. There were three points for a victory and one each for a draw. The champions and runners-up would enter the qualifying rounds of the 2005–06 Champions League, the third placed team would enter the UEFA Cup second qualifying round. The bottom placed team would be relegated, the second last team would play a play-off against relegation.

Basel's priority aim for the season was to win the championship for the second time in a row. The season started somewhat difficult, of the first four home matches only two were won. Nevertheless, Basel moved to the top of the league table. During September the team lost two away games in a row, but despite this they led the league table by seven points by the winter break.

The league was originally contested by ten teams. On 4 February 2005 the parent company of Servette FC was declared bankrupt. As a consequence of the bankruptcy Servette FC had their license revoked. The eighteen results from the team's first half of the season remained in the league table. The club's second half matches were cancelled entirely and so the second half of the season was competed with only nine clubs.

Basel completed all the season's seventeen home ties undefeated, winning thirteen and drawing four. The highest home attendance being 31,383 in the 4–1 win against their title rivals Thun on 7 May 2005. Just four days later Basel secured the championship in their third last round of the season. At the end of the season they completed their championship aim, winning the title ten points clear of Thun, who were their closest rivals. Servette were subsequently demoted to the Second Tier. Schaffhausen played the play-off against relegation and were able to remain in the top flight.

One of the season's highlights for the team, was the 8–1 home win on 12 September against Grasshoppers in which Giménez scored four goals. Matías Delgado, Mladen Petrić, Djamel Mesbah and César Carignano each netted once. On 20 April Giménez also scored for goals in the away game against Aarau as Basel won 5–0. He also managed at hat-trick on 4 May as Basel won 5–0 in the away game against Xamax. Giménez was the team's and the league's top goal scorer with 27 goals. Matías Delgado was the team's second top scorer with 11 league goals. César Carignano scored seven and Julio Hernán Rossi scored six.

=== Domestic Cup ===
Basel entered the Swiss Cup in the first round and the team's clear aim for the Cup was to win it. Teams from Super League and Challenge League were seeded in this round. In a match, the home advantage was granted to the team from the lower league, if applicable.

==== FC Oberdorf (18 September 2004) ====
In the first round Basel were drawn against local amateur club FC Oberdorf, who at that time played in the fifth tier of Swiss football. The grounds that Oberdorf used at that time was an artificial turf field and on one side was a small grandstand with 100 covered seats and space for maximum 2,000 spectators. Because of the big fixture in the Cup temporary stands were built and the match was played in front of over 5,000 spectators. Head-coach Christian Gross left seven regular players out of the team and played with a B-team. Nevertheless, they took command of the game from the first whistle and Julio Hernán Rossi netted their first goal after three minutes. Rossi's next shot ten minutes later rebounded off the post and another ten minutes later he scored his second goal. Rossi remained lively and his next shot also hit the post. Basel let the amateurs play their game but after about an hour it was obvious that their strength decreased. Mile Sterjovski added a third goal on 70 minutes, Boris Smiljanić hit the post with a header and David Degen added another goal and the result was 4–0 for the visitors.

==== FC Meyrin (24 October 2004) ====
In the second round the teams from Super League were seeded and could not play against each other. In a match, the home advantage was granted to the team from the lower league. Basel were drawn against second tier semi-professional team FC Meyrin. Their stadium Bois-Carré (Meyrin) was also small and so they also built temporary stands and the game was played in front of a record 3,148 spectators. Basel took command of the game from the first minutes and Julio Hernán Rossi was again in good form and his sprints into the free spaces were very quick. It was he who netted Basel's first goal after 15 minutes. Basel remained in control of the game, but it was the hosts who scored the equaliser after a counterattack just before the half time whistle. Basel tool control of the game again but the lower-tier team defended with everything they had. Christian Giménez was substituted in the 69th minute and just a seconds later he put the visitors into the lead again. Seven minutes later Giménez netted his second personal goal and the result was 3–1 for Basel.

==== FC Thun (20 November 2004) ====
In the third round the ties were drawn, there was no seeding, everyone could meet everyone. The home advantage was granted to the team from the lower league, otherwise to the team that was drawn first. Basel were drawn away against Super League team Thun. Basel head-coach Christian Gross fielded his strongest team, however four players were injured and Benjamin Huggel was missing due to a suspension. The game between the two teams was at eye level, both teams created their chances. Mario Raimondi was able to put the hosts a goal up in the 57th minute, but the lively Julio Hernán Rossi equalised ten minutes later. The match went into extra time but no further goals were scored and a penalty shoot-out was held to make the decision. In the shoot-out Boris Smiljanić missed Basel's second penalty, then Mario Raimondi missed Thun's third and as Mile Sterjovski missed Basel's last spot-kick it was clear that Basel lost 4–3 on penalties.

==== Conclusion ====
Thus Basel missed their aim of winning the Cup. The Cup final was played on 16 May 2005 in which upper tier Zürich beat lower tier Luzern 3–1 to win the trophy.

=== Europe ===
==== Champions League ====
===== Third qualifying round =====
Because Basel entered the 2004–05 UEFA Champions League in the third qualifying round their aim was to reach the group stage. However, they were drawn against Internazionale.

====== Internazionale (11 August 2004) ======
The first leg was played in St. Jakob-Park and was arbitrated by English referee Graham Poll. Pushed on by the sold-out 30,000 spectator crowd the Swiss champions Basel took the early initiative and it was their Argentinian attacking duo Christian Giménez and Julio Hernán Rossi dictating the flow of the game from the very beginning. Inter defended well in the early stage and after they had withstood the early storm, they started to get their game together, stringing their passes together and it was the away side who made the first strike. In the 19th minute, Adriano powered past two Basel defenders and placed his shot low beyond the onrushing goalkeeper Pascal Zuberbühler. Basel were not shocked by this early strike against them, and countered this just six minutes later. Mario Cantaluppi surprised the Inter defence by lobbing a free-kick high to the near post, here it was controlled by Rossi who then, with a smart overhead kick, played it into the danger area. Benjamin Huggel was ready and headed in from close range. Inter reacted immediately, but Dejan Stanković's powerful long-range shot rebounded off the post. Then the game opened and Basel could have scored again as Huggel's right-footed volley from about 12 yards narrowly flashed wide. However, it was Inter who had the best opportunity before the break. Again, it was Adriano rushing towards goal, Zuberbühler rushed out against him but could only parry the ball straight into the path of Zé Maria, but his shot from close range hit the bar. Basel started into the second period as they had started in the first, pushing forwards with tempo. Francesco Toldo made to good saves, first parrying a long-range lob from Matías Delgado and then a hard hit shot from Rossi. The Italian championship had not yet started and the Swiss season had already been going for a month, therefore the Inter players were tired towards the end, however Basel failed to take advantage of this, Huggel coming closest in the 78th minute as he hit a low drive from the edge of the penalty area, but the visitors were saved by the post. The game ended with a 1–1 draw.

====== Return match (25 August 2004) ======
In the second leg it was Inter who were quickly into play, with Álvaro Recoba forcing Basel goalkeeper Pascal Zuberbühler into a good save a few seconds after kick-off. Only a few seconds later the home crowd were able to celebrate as Adriano put Inter ahead with a low shot precise inside the far post after a pass from Dejan Stanković. Inter controlled the game in the early stages and scored their second goal after just 13 minutes. A superb shot from Stankovic, following a neat combination with Adriano gave the home team a two-goal advantage. Despite the two-goal lead, the home side refused to sit back and Zuberbühler had to make another good save after a long distance left-foot shot by Recoba. After 26 minutes, Inter goalie Francesco Toldo deflected a powerful free-kick from Basel captain Murat Yakin wide. Inter went close to scoring a third goal just minutes later as Stankovic shot wide from a good position after a combination between Zé Maria and Adriano on the right wing. Basel had another dangerous free-kick shortly before half-time, Mario Cantaluppi's kick was slightly wide. Basel fought themselves back into the game. Just four minutes into the second half as Austrainlien midfielder Mile Sterjovski, just inside the penalty area, controlled a cross from his left to dribble past Stankovic and score with an exact right-foot shot. However, the home team restored their two-goal lead only four minutes later as Adriano took on a ball from Stankovic outside the penalty area. He took a few paces forward and fired low, left footed, beyond keeper Zuberbühler. The home team secured their victory a few minutes later, this time Recoba's left footed shot dropped into the net. The Uruguayan forward controlled a long pass from Juan Sebastián Verón, he turned towards the Basel goal and shot from about 18 metres and the game ended for Basel with an undeserved high 1–4 defeat.

Basel lost 5–2 on aggregate and subsequently dropped into the 2004–05 UEFA Cup.

==== UEFA Cup ====
===== First round =====
Basel's clear aim for this competition was to reach the group stage and to advance to the knock-out stage, which was to start after the winter break. In the first round Basel were drawn against the Russian side FC Terek Grozny.

====== Terek Grozny (16 September 2004) ======
The first leg of the tie against the Russian Cup holders was played in the Lokomotiv Stadium (Moscow) because of the political situation in Chechnya. Torrential rain before and during the game had made pitch soggy and tricky underfoot. In the early minutes the home defence had problems keeping the Basel forwards under control. The visitors started well and looked the most likely team to score in the early stages. After just four minutes Christian Giménez was unlucky not to score, his close-range header hit the post after Mile Sterjovski had nodded forward a right-wing cross from Julio Hernán Rossi. In the ninth minute Giménez again went close, but his header was held by Terek goalkeeper Volodymyr Savchenko at the second attempt. The home side came better into the game as the match progressed. With their only real chance of the first half they took the lead as a through-ball from Aleksandr Shmarko beat the Basel offside trap and Andrei Fedkov pushed the ball past keeper Pascal Zuberbühler in the 38th minute. Basel pressed consistently for an equaliser. Scott Chipperfield's corner from the left in the 57th minute was headed on by Rossi and Giménez was left unmarked to score with his knee from just three metres. Despite the fact that towards the end of the game it was the home team who more in control of the game and despite the slippery conditions, the two defences remained mainly on top and the game ended with this 1–1 draw.

====== Return match (30 September 2004) ======
The second leg was played in St. Jakob-Park in front of 15,895 spectators. It was again Basel who started better into the game. Christian Giménez was again the most dangerous striker with two early chances. But it was Julio Hernán Rossi who opened the score in the 11th minute. Basel should have added to the score with the chances that they created, but as the match progressed the Terek midfield and defense became more hardy and Basel were lacking creative ideas, especially in the second period. In the 65th minute, therefore, Basel head-coach Christian Gross substituted Rossi out and brought in the more creative player Matías Delgado. This tactical move paid-off as in the 89th minute Delgado crossed from the left after a corner-kick and Brazilian right back Kléber nodded the ball home to give Basel a 2–0 win and a 3–1 on aggregate.

===== Group stage =====
In the group stage Basel faced considerably tougher opponents. Five teams were drawn into each of the eight groups and were to play a round robin, there were no return games. The top three teams in each group progressed to the Round of 32, to be joined by the eight third-place finishers from the Champions League group stage. Basel were drawn in to Group A together with Feyenoord Rotterdam, FC Schalke 04, Ferencvárosi TC and Heart of Midlothian.

====== Schalke 04 (21 October 2004) ======
On matchday one Basel played in the Arena AufSchalke in front of an attendance of 52,870 spectators in Gelsenkirchen against German team Schalke 04, who had won the Intertoto Cup in August. Basel captain Murat Yakin could not play due to back injuries and midfielder Ivan Ergic was also ruled out due to an injury. The Swiss Super League leaders started fast and confident into the game, pushing Schalke back with early attacks. But then the German side took control of the match. Midfielder Christian Poulsen won a loose ball and played a long ball to winger Levan Kobiashvili, who broke through the middle and shot powerfully passed Basel keeper Pascal Zuberbühler from outside the penalty after eight minutes. Schalke striker Gerald Asamoah was very lively and the visitors were forced to defend deep. Basel eventually fought back to claim the midfield with some quick and accurate passes and they created their best chance in the 36th minute. Julio Hernán Rossi's corner-kick from the left was met well by Benjamin Huggel who headed toward goal from close range, but keeper Frank Rost was able to push the ball away to safety. Following a poor start to the second half, Basel came back to life. First David Degen with a good break forced an excellent save from Rost, then after 57 minutes Christian Giménez' headed forced the goalkeeper to tip the ball over the bar, at full stretch. In the 82nd minute an impressive free-kick from substitute Matías Delgado, who curled his shot over the wall and left keeper Rost stranded at the wrong side of the goal. The 1–1 draw was the result.

====== Heart of Midlothian (25 November 2004) ======
On matchday two (4 November) Basel had their rest-day and on matchday three they played at home in St. Jakob-Park in front of 21,650 spectators, with Kristinn Jakobsson (Iceland) as referee, against Hearts. Basel captain Murat Yakin could not play due to his sustaining back injuries, striker Mladen Petrić was out injured and midfielder Ivan Ergic was also ruled out ill. Hearts had lost their first two games in the group. Basel started well into the game and their striker Christian Giménez slashed a hard shot towards the far corner of the goal in the opening minutes, which needed a good save from keeper Craig Gordon. The young goalkeeper blocked the shot into the field, but Julio Hernán Rossi was not able to reach the rebound. Basel dominated the game, they restricted the visitors immensely and Hearts were only able to entered the Basel penalty area from set-pieces. Following a free-kick and a near miss from Michael Stewart, just minutes later Hearts took a surprise lead. A set-piece and Hearts surprisingly played the ball low, three quick passes, Dennis Wyness found room and the striker slotted the ball beyond goalkeeper Pascal Zuberbühler for the first goal of the game. The home team were now forced to be more committed with their attacks and they put Hearts under increased pressure, responding well to the conceded goal. Only some desperate last-ditch defending denied the hosts from obtaining their equaliser. Basel then started the second half as they had ended the first period, pressing forward. Basel's head-coach Christian Gross changed his attackers midway through the second half and his substitutions quickly paid out. César Carignano slotted home the equaliser. Basel pressed hard for the winning goal as the time ticked on. Hearts' last-gasp winner, in the 89th minute, was more a speculative attack and was made only to relieve the defensive pressure, but it paid off as Robbie Neilson pushed his shot under the body of goalie Zuberbühler with only seconds left on the clock, his first ever goal for the club. Basel versus Hearts 1–2 result.

====== Ferencvárosi TC (1 December 2004) ======
Matchday four saw Basel play the away tie at the Stadium Puskás Ferenc with some 22,000 spectators against Ferencvárosi TC under referee Vitaliy Godulyan (Ukraine). Basel started, as ever, fast and dominant into the game, and because head-coach Christian Gross had lined up a three-man attack, this formation led to a number of early chances. In the 8th minute Julio Hernán Rossi fed Christian Giménez with a good pass, he crossed from the left, but striker César Carignano was unable to put the visitors ahead. Basel also had a height advantage at set-pieces and one minute later, Marco Zwyssig rose highest to head Sébastien Barberis' free-kick, but the effort went narrowly wide. On 19 minutes Boris Smiljanić also headed an effort just wide of Lajos Szűcs' left-hand post. Despite their early domination, Basel went behind three minutes later, Smiljanic fouled Aleksandar Bajevski in the box. Szabolcs Huszti's spot-kick was parried by Pascal Zuberbühler, but the keeper was unable to keep hold of the ball. Huszti reacted first, he headed the rebound across the goal and Dénes Rósa was able to head the ball into the net. Basel dominated the second half as well and goals from Rossi and Benjamin Huggel turned the match in Basel's favour. However, the Hungarian side failed to level things in the 86th minute with their second penalty, as keeper Szücs shot the ball wide. Basel beat Ferencváros 2–1 and moved up to third slot in the table.

====== Feyenoord Rotterdam (16 December 2004) ======
The fifth and final matchday of the group stage was played at home in St. Jakob-Park in front of 25,660 spectators against Feyenoord. Again the early stages of the game were dominated by Basel, with Christian Giménez being extremely lively at the outset. In the third minute he rushed down the right wing to bring in a dangerous cross that flashed across the goal area. Then he switched over to the other wing four minutes later and combined with Julio Hernán Rossi, who in turn crossed to Mile Sterjovski and his header found the target, but was disallowed due to an offside position. Minutes later Giménez was again involved, speedily moving into space in the box, in a strong counterattack. He unleashed a fierce shot, but Patrick Mtiliga was able to stretch and block the ball. In the 18th minute a second disallowed goal, Giménez poking the ball in from close range but he was denied by the assistant's flag. Feyenoord threatened for the first time in the 25th minute, Salomon Kalou used his strength to overcome defensive-midfielder Benjamin Huggel, but his effort went wide. Feyenoord played better in the final stages of the first half, with good passes in midfield and some direct balls into the penalty area. However, Basel defended well and they still created the better chances, Rossi forced a good save from keeper Patrick Lodewijks, Scott Chipperfield headed a cross just wide of the post and Giménez tested the goalkeeper again with a powerful left-footed drive.

Basel came into the second half aiming to dominate possession and initially they did so. But Feyenoord showed their counterattacking potential with a long ball and Salomon Kalou's accurate shot, but home keeper Pascal Zuberbühler dived low to his left and pushed the ball around the post. After this, Giménez received a good pass from Carignano, but smashed his half-volley straight at keeper Lodewijks. In the 53rd minute these two strikers combined again for the game's decisive moment. Giménez lifted his cross over the defence, Carignano sprinted in at the far post and headed the all-important winning goal. Thereafter Basel concentrated on containing their opponents to protected their safe passage into the next round. This was successful and the final result was this one goal victory. The goal difference decided the positions in the table, because Feyenoord, Schalke and Basel finished level on seven points. But Basel qualified for the Round of 32.

===== Round of 32 =====
The final phase of the 2004–05 UEFA Cup began on 16 February 2005, and concluded with the final at the Estádio José Alvalade in Lisbon on 18 May 2005. The final phase involved the 24 teams that finished in the top three in each group in the group stage and the eight teams that finished in third place in the UEFA Champions League group stage. As third placed team in their group, Basel were qualified for the Round of 32 and here they were drawn against Lille OSC.

====== Lille OSC (17 February 2005) ======
The first leg was played in the St. Jakob-Park in front of 19,092 spectators. French team Lille earned themselves a valuable away draw in the snow that fell in Basel during the match, as a frustrating evening for the hosts ended with a goalless draw and this thanks to the heroic game of Lille's Senegalese goalkeeper Tony Sylva. The Swiss champions Basel, who returned for the first time to competitive football following their two-month domestic winter break, played strongly in the opening period, but they had nothing to show despite their early efforts. This was also because of the snow and soggy pitch, that slowed their game, to the advantage of the visitors and their goalkeeper. In the first few minutes, a few near misses brought the match to life and these could have provided at least a goal or two. Basel created two excellent chances in quick succession, Christian Giménez headed a ball towards goalie Sylva from close-range, the goalie held. Then Julio Hernán Rossi failed to score following a defensive mix-up, the goalie held. Lille responded and full-back Grégory Tafforeau hit a strong drive from the distance, but the ball flew passed the wrong side of the far post. Basel pressed forward in the second half as well, but keeper Sylva was in unbeatable form in the Lille goal. Basel became even stronger as the match progressed, Christian Gross' men definitely controlled the game in the second half, but they were denied on several occasions by Sylva. The 29-year-old Senegalese international frustrated the home side on numerous occasions and therefore the game ended with a goalless draw.

====== Return match (24 February 2005) ======
The second leg was played a week later in Stadium Lille Métropole, which was the temporary home stadium of Lille OSC before the completion of the nearby Stade Pierre-Mauroy. Basel had played only one game after the winter break in the Swiss domestic league and they had lost this 3–1 against St. Gallen four days before this tie, but they started the game well. Lille had ended each of their last five games with a draw, three of these goalless and they looked nervous in the opening stages. However, goalkeeper Tony Sylva was rarely troubled. After somewhat more than half an hour Lille started to dominate possession, but lacked the finishing touch to show for some enterprising attacking play. Matt Moussilou in the 37th minute and a foul penalty converted by Milenko Ačimovič gave a comfortable 2–0 victory for the 2004 UEFA Intertoto Cup winners and let them advance to the next round and to set up an all-French tie with Auxerre in the Round of 16.

====== Conclusion ======
Basel were defeated 2–0 on aggregate by Lille OSC. The club had hoped that they could have continued a round or perhaps two further, but despite being knocked out at this stage, the aim for their European campaign could be considered as achieved. CSKA Moscow won the 2004–05 UEFA Cup beating Sporting CP in the final.

== Club ==
=== The Management ===
Position	Staff
Manager	(Switzerland) Christian Gross
Assistant manager	(Switzerland) Fritz Schmid
Fitness Coach	(Switzerland) Thomas Grüter
Fitness Coach	(Switzerland) Romain Crevoisier
Youth Team Coach	(Switzerland) Heinz Hermann
Youth Team Co-Coach	(Switzerland) Stefano Ceccaroni (Switzerland) Sandro Kamber

Last updated: June 2004
Source: Homepage FCB

=== Kit ===
Supplier: Nike
Sponsor(s): Novartis

Home	Away

=== Other information ===
Chairman	(Switzerland) Mr Werner Edelmann
Ground (capacity and dimensions)	St. Jakob-Park (33,433 / 120x80 m)

Source: Homepage FCB

== Players ==
The following is the list of the Basel first team squad. It includes all players that were in the squad the day the season started on 17 July 2004 but subsequently left the club after that date and it includes all players that transferred in during the season.

=== First team squad ===
Note: Flags indicate national team as defined under FIFA eligibility rules; some limited exceptions apply. Players may hold more than one non-FIFA nationality.

No.	Pos.	Nation	Player
1	GK	SUI	Pascal Zuberbühler
3	DF	SUI	Samuele Preisig (on loan to Concordia Basel)
4	DF	SUI	Alexandre Quennoz
5	DF	SUI	Marco Zwyssig
6	MF	SUI	Benjamin Huggel
7	FW	CRO	Mladen Petrić
8	MF	AUS	Mile Sterjovski
9	FW	ARG	César Carignano
11	MF	AUS	Scott Chipperfield
12	MF	SUI	Sébastien Barberis
13	FW	ARG	Christian Eduardo Giménez
14	MF	ALG	Djamel Mesbah
15	DF	SUI	Murat Yakin
16	DF	SUI	Patrick Müller

No.	Pos.	Nation	Player
17	MF	SUI	Mario Cantaluppi
18	GK	SUI	Eric Rapo
19	DF	BRA	Kléber
20	MF	ARG	Matías Emilio Delgado
21	MF	SUI	David Degen
22	MF	SCG	Ivan Ergić
23	DF	SUI	Philipp Degen
24	DF	CMR	Timothée Atouba
29	MF	BIH	Damir Džombić
30	DF	SUI	Boris Smiljanić
32	DF	SUI	Reto Zanni
33	FW	ARG	Julio Hernán Rossi
35	GK	AUT	Thomas Mandl
—	MF	SUI	Baykal Kulaksızoğlu

=== Transfers Summer 2004 ===
==== In ====
9	FW	ARG	César Carignano (from Colón de Santa Fe)
8	MF	AUS	Mile Sterjovski (from Lille)
1	GK	AUT	Thomas Mandl (from Austria Vienna)
19	DF	BRA	Kléber (from Hannover 96)
14	DF	ALG	Djamel Mesbah (from Servette)

==== Out ====
—	FW	CMR	Hervé Tum (to Metz – n/a)
—	DF	CMR	Timothée Atouba (to Tottenham Hotspurs – n/a)
17	MF	SUI	Mario Cantaluppi (to 1. FC Nürnberg – n/a)
—	FW	ARG	Francisco Gabriel Guerrero (returned to Zürich – end of loan)
9	FW	SUI	Marco Streller (to VfB Stuttgart – n/a)

=== Transfers Winter 2004–05 ===
==== In ====
16	DF	SUI	Patrick Müller (from Mallorca)
32	DF	SUI	Reto Zanni (from Thun)
—	MF	SUI	Baykal Kulaksızoğlu (from Thun)

==== Out ====
3	DF	SUI	Samuele Preisig (on loan to Concordia Basel)
18	GK	SUI	Eric Rapo (to Stade Nyonnais – n/a)

== Results and fixtures ==
Legend

Win Draw Loss Postponed

=== Friendlies ===
==== Pre-season/first half of season ====
23 June 2004 Exhibition game	Celerina Auswahl (Switzerland)	0–11	(Switzerland) Basel	San Gian, Celerina
17:30		FCB summary	10' (0:1) Preisig; 14' (0:2) Chipperfield; 21' (0:3) Delgado; 31' (0:4) Delgado; 32' (0:5) Giménez; 35' (0:6) Rossi; 40' (0:7) Delgado; 45' (0:8) Chipperfield; 52' (0:9) Carignano; 76' (0:10) Carignano; 87' (0:11) Petrić	Attendance: 500; Referee: (Switzerland) Bognar (Chur)
Note: Basel without Yakin, Huggel, Zwyssig, Zuberbühler, and Atouba (all with their national teams), as well as Ph. Degen, Sterjovski, and Ergic (all ill).

26 June 2004 Pre-season friendly	Vaduz (Liechtenstein)	0–2	(Switzerland) Basel	Sportplatz Rheinau, Balzers
15:00		FCB summary	15' (0:1) D. Degen; 57' (0:2) Giménez	Attendance: 1,000; Referee: (Liechtenstein) Breker
Note: Basel without Zuberbühler, Zwyssig, Yakin, and Huggel (all on vacation until July 5), Atouba (with the Cameroon national team), as well as Sterjovski and Ergic (both ill).

13 July 2004 Pre-season friendly	Basel (Switzerland)	1–4	(France) Sochaux	Près Dom, Alle
18:45	Carignano 82' (1:4)	FCB summary	45' (0:1) Santos; 49' (o.g.) (Quennoz); 62' (0:3) de Carvalho; 81' (0:4) de Carvalho	Attendance: 2,600; Referee: (Switzerland) Nicole Petignat (Courgenay)
Note: Basel without Yakin, P. Degen, Smiljanic, Gimenez, and Rossi (all rested). Sochaux without Boudarene, Daf, and Zaïri (all injured), and Diawara (absent). 23rd minute: Sochaux defender Flachez left the pitch due to injury. 19th minute: Petric hit the crossbar with a shot. First FCB appearance for Djamel Mesbah.

20 July 2004 Friendly	Basel (Switzerland)	3–3	(Germany) Werder Bremen	Stadion Bergholz, Wil
19:30	Carignano 56' (1:3); Rossi 73' (2:3); Rossi 82' (2:4)	FCB summary	36' (0:1) Klasnić; 45' (0:2) Klose; 50' (0:3) Borowski	Attendance: 4,450; Referee: (Switzerland) Nicole Petignat (Courgenay)
Note: Basel without Atouba, Zuberbühler, Yakin, Cantaluppi, Gimenez, and Chipperfield (all rested), and Ergic (ill). Bremen without Charisteas, Jensen, Reinke, Davala, Nery, Lagerblom, and Valdez. 12th minute: Werder defender Magnin left the pitch, with a suspected muscle tear in his right thigh. Fair game, no yellow cards

27 July 2004 Friendly	Basler Regio Selection (Switzerland)	2–8	(Switzerland) Basel	Buschweilerhof, Basel
19:00	Eng 33' (1:4); Leganyi 42' (2:4)	FCB summary	17' (0:1) Delgado; 19' (0:2) Carignano; 26' (0:3) D. Degen; 31' (0:4) Carignano; 43' (pen. 2:5) Carignano; 49' (2:6) Carignano; 80' (2:7) Rossi; 89' (2:8) Carignano	Attendance: 1,500; Referee: (Switzerland) Markus Von Känel
Note: Basel without Zuberbühler, Chipperfield, Gimenez, and Cantaluppi (all left out of the squad), P. Degen (unused substitute), and Ergic (was ill). After coming on as a substitute, Petric played in central midfield; Atouba took over Mesbah’s position on the left side of midfield. 86th minute: a shot from Huggel hit the post. Fair game, no yellow cards

31 August 2004 Mid-season	Wohlen (Switzerland)	0–7	(Switzerland) Basel	Stadion Niedermatten, Wohlen
19:00		FCB summary	1' (0:1) Petrić; 3' (0:2) D. Degen; 9' (0:3) Petrić; 46' (0:4) D. Degen; 48' (0:5) Petrić; 76' (0:6) Carignano; 90' (0:7) Delgado	Attendance: 3,085; Referee: (Switzerland) Nicole Petignat (Courgenay)
Note: Wohlen, among others, without Hodel (injured); Basel without Zuberbühler, Huggel and Yakin (Swiss national team), Mandl (Austrian national team), Quennoz, Mesbah and Rossi (all injured), Philipp Degen (not in the squad), and Ergic (was ill) but including youth players Diego Würmli (goalkeeper), Claudio Megna, Samuele Preisig, Zdravko Kuzmanovic and Nico Thüring. Fair game, no yellow cards

12 October 2004 Mid-season	Nordstern (Switzerland)	0–8	(Switzerland) Basel	Stadion Rankhof, Basel
19:00	Gissinger (penalty missed) 77′	FCB summary	3' (0:1) Petrić; 7' (0:2) Rossi; 13' (0:3) Giménez; 20' (0:4) Petrić; 39' (0:5) D. Degen; 57' (0:6) Rossi; 68' (0:7) Delgado; 89' (0:8) Rossi	Attendance: 850; Referee: (Switzerland) Claudio Circhetta (Muttenz)
Note: Basel without Zuberbühler, Huggel, and Kléber (all rested); Chipperfield and Yakin (injured); Sterjovski (with the Australian national team); and Ergic (lacking match fitness). 46th minute, following the substitution of P. Degen FCB with tactical ahange, Barberis moves to a defensive midfield role, while Delgado takes up a position in attacking midfield. 77th minute, FCB goalkeeper Mandl saved the penalty from Gissinger.

==== Sempione Cup ====
The Sempione Cup was a club football tournament played in summer at Sportanlage Moos, Balsthal, during the years 1987 to 2004.

29 June 2004 Sempionecup; Semi-final	Basel (Switzerland)	1–2	(Georgia (country)) Dinamo Tbilisi	Sportanlage Moos, Balsthal
20:00	Petrić 67' (1:1)	FCB summary	(yellow card) 26' Shashiashvili; (yellow card) 33' Silagadze; (yellow card) 45' Kashia; 66' (0:1) Kvirkvelia; 70' (1:2) Akhalaia; (yellow card) 72' Akhalaia	Attendance: 1,500; Referee: (Switzerland) Claudio Circhetta (Muttenz)
Note: FCB without Zuberbühler, Zwyssig, Huggel and Yakin (all on vacation), Atouba (with the Cameroon national team), Mandl (not yet in training), Dzombic (on trial at Schaffhausen) and Ergic (was ill). 60th minute: FCB with tactical change Barberis moved to the left side of the defense, Sterjovski to the right midfield. This was Sterjovski’s first match for FCB. 55th minute: a shot from Iashvili hit the crossbar. 79th minute: a shot from Akhalaia hit the post.

3 July 2004 Sempionecup; Match for 3rd place	Basel (Switzerland)	3–3	(Romania) Dinamo București	Sportanlage Moos, Balsthal
19:00	Giménez 33' (1:1); Giménez 46' (2:1); Smiljanić 63' (3:1); D. Degen (yellow card) 65'; Delgado (yellow card) 84'	FCB summary	11' Dănciulescu; 66' (3:2) Niculescu; (yellow card) 76' Ciubotariu; (yellow card) 80' Dănciulescu; 85' (3:3) Niculescu	Attendance: 1,900; Referee: (Switzerland) Guido Wildhaber (Kerzers)
Note: FCB without Cantaluppi (minor adductor issues), Zuberbühler, Zwyssig, Huggel, Yakin (extended leave following the European Championship), Atouba (with the Cameroon national team), Ergic (was ill), Mandl (not in the squad), and Kleber (joined the team that day).

==== Uhrencup ====
The Uhrencup was a club football tournament, held annually in Grenchen.

7 July 2004 Uhrencup; Semi-final	Basel (Switzerland)	0–3	(Germany) 1. FC Kaiserslautern	Stadion Brühl, Grenchen
20:00	Rossi (yellow card) 19'	FCB summary	35' (0:1) Amanatidis; 51' (0:2) Amanatidis; (yellow card) 65' Mikić; 76' Teber	Attendance: 5,100; Referee: (Switzerland) Claudio Circhetta (Muttenz)
Note: FCB without Zuberbühler, Yakin, Zwyssig, Kleber and Mesbah (all rested), Atouba (who is only returning from Cameroon today), and Ergic (was ill). Kaiserslautern among others without, Sforza (injured) and Nerlinger. 15th minute: a header from Sterjovski hit the crossbar. 33rd minute: a shot from Carignano hit the crossbar. 63rd minute: a shot from Sterjovski hit the crossbar.

9 July 2004 Uhrencup; Match for third place	Basel (Switzerland)	3–0	(Germany) Schalke 04	Stadion Brühl, Grenchen
20:30	P. Degen (yellow card) 19'; Giménez 33'; Smiljanić 49'; Delgado 55'; Kléber (yellow card) 86'	FCB summary	(yellow card) 20' Aílton; (yellow card) 34' Asamoah; (yellow card) 11' (yellow-red card) 83' Krstajić	Attendance: 8,123; Referee: (Switzerland) Guido Wildhaber (Kerzers)
Note: FCB without Cantaluppi and Petric (both injured), Ergic (was ill), Huggel (attending a wedding) and Mesbah (not in the squad). Schalke was without Sand, Lincoln and Bordon.

==== Winter break and mid-season friendlies ====
11 January 2005 First trainings camp	Basel (Switzerland)	4–1	(Germany) Hamburger SV	Sportplatz La Manga, La Manga
16:00	Giménez 6' (1:0); Giménez 30' (pen.); Carignano 46' (3:1); P. Degen 68' (4:1)	FCB summary	26' (1:1) Reinhardt; (yellow card) 54' Laas; (yellow card) 77' Brečko	Attendance: 500; Referee: (Spain) Pedro Zamora Romero (Murcia).
Note: FCB without Petric (injured), Yakin, Ergic (rehabilitation training), and Mandl (not in the squad; he will be in goal for Thursday’s friendly against Wolfsburg). Hamburg without Moreira (injured). FCB with tactical change in the second half, Smiljanic played as a left-back.

13 January 2005 First trainings camp	Basel (Switzerland)	2–2	(Germany) VfL Wolfsburg	Sportplatz La Manga, La Manga
	Müller 59' (1:1); D. Degen 62' (2:1)	FCB summary	34' (0:1) Topićt; (yellow card) 49' Franz; 64' (2:2) Rytter	Attendance: 200; Referee: (Spain) Antonio Cerezuela Caravaca (Murcia).
Note: FCB without Petric and Mesbah (both injured), Yakin and Ergic (both undergoing rehabilitation), and Zuberbühler (not in the squad). Wolfsburg without Hristov, Jentzsch, d’Alessandro, and Klimowitz (all injured). 80th minute: a shot from Gimenez hit the post.

19 January 2005 Exhibition game	Basel (Switzerland)	2–0	(Switzerland) Concordia	St. Jakob-Areal, Basel
15:00	Carignano 45' (1:0); Rossi 75' (2:0)	FCB summary	(penalty missed) 16′ N'Tiamoah	Attendance: 400; Referee: (Switzerland) Martin Salm (Veltheim, Aargau)
Note: FCB without Zuberbühler, Müller, Kléber (rested), Yakin, Ergic, Petric and Mesbah (all undergoing rehabilitation); Concordia without Peço, Castelli, Schaad and Saccone (all injured). 10th minute, a goal by Carignano was disallowed due to an offside. 16th minute, FCB goalkeeper Mandl saved the penalty taken by Ntiamoah following a foul. FCB with tactical change starting in the 46th minute, Zanni moved to left-back and Philipp Degen to right-back; from the 59th minute, Rossi played in attack, with Delgado positioned behind the forwards. 61st minute: Quennoz, attempting a clearance, stroke the ball against his own goalpost. Fair game, no yellow cards

22 January 2005 Winter break	Basel (Switzerland)	4–1	(Switzerland) Wil	St. Jakob-Areal, Basel
13:30	Kléber 38' (1:0); P. Degen 52' (2:0); Carignano 68' (3:0); Carignano 73' (4:0)	FCB summary	85' (pen. 4:1) Burki	Attendance: 1'200; Referee: (Switzerland) Binggeli
Note: FCB without Yakin and Petric (both in rehabilitation training), Mesbah (injured), and Zuberbühler, Huggel, Smiljanic and Gimenez (all with muscular issues). Wil without Schönenberger, Oberli, K. Nushi, Wiederkehr, Gsell and Vitinho (all injured). 63rd minute: Savic hit the post with a free kick. First appearance for Ivan Ergic since 22 May 2004. Fair game, no yellow cards

25 January 2005 Second trainings camp	Basel (Switzerland)	1–0	(Serbia and Montenegro) Partizan Belgrade	Arcadia, Belek (Turkey)
	Chipperfield 42' (1:0)	FCB summary	(yellow card) 44' Nađ	Attendance: 20; Referee: (Turkey) Cihan Burgan, (Antalya)
Note: FCB without Carignano (stomach trouble), Huggel, Sterjovski and Kléber (all rested), Petric and Yakin (both undergoing fitness training), as well as Smiljanic and Mesbah (both injured). 27th minute: a shot from Ilic hit the post. Tactical change from the 66th minute, Basel played with two forwards and a five-man midfield, from the 77th minute, P. Degen moved to the left side of the midfield.

28 January 2005 Trainings camp	Basel (Switzerland)	2–4	(Russia) Torpedo Moscow	Gloria Verde, Belek (Turkey)
14:00	Delgado (yellow card) 25'; Huggel (yellow card) 30'; Huggel (yellow card) 56' (red card); Rossi 70' (1:3); Sterjovski 77' (2:3)	FCB summary	8' (0:1) Panow; 48' (0:2) Semshov; (yellow card) 53' Zirjanow; (yellow card) 54' Semshov; 68' (0:3) Semshov; 83' (2:4) Panow	Attendance: 50; Referee: (Russia) Sergej Talagajaw, (Moscow)
Note: FCB without Zuberbühler (rested), Carignano (stomach upset), Mesbah and Smiljanic (both injured), as well as Petric and Yakin (both undergoing fitness training). 16th minute: a shot from Rossi hit the post. Red card: 56th minute, Huggel (violent conduct towards teammate Gimenez; FC Basel are nonetheless permitted to continue with eleven players).

4 February 2005 Winter break	Yverdon-Sport (Switzerland)	0–2	(Switzerland) Basel	Stade Municipal, Yverdon-les-Bains
18:30		FCB summary	17' (0:1) Rossi; (yellow card) 37' Zwyssig; 85' (0:2) Ergić	Attendance: 1'480; Referee: (Switzerland) Stephan Studer, Lancy
Note: Yverdon without Gomes and Sejmenovic (both injured). FCB without Petric, Yakin, and Smiljanic (all undergoing rehabilitation), Mandl and Mesbah (both injured), and Delgado (was ill).

8 February 2005 Winter break	Basel (Switzerland)	0–1	(Switzerland) SC Kriens	Leichtathletikstadion St. Jakob, Basel
19:00		FCB summary	7' (0:1) Marini	Attendance: 350; Referee: (Switzerland) Daniel Wermelinger (Aarau)
Note: FCB without Zuberbühler, Müller, Huggel, P. Degen, Sterjovski and Chipperfield (all away with their national teams), D. Degen (U21 national team), Mesbah and Smiljanic (both injured), and Yakin (undergoing rehabilitation). Kriens without Foletti, Egli, Brand, Benson, Lovric, Müller and Bachmann (all injured). 3rd minute: a shot from Kléber hit the post. Tactical change from the 77th minute: Zanni swapped positions with Barberis. Fair game, no yellow cards.

12 February 2005 Winter break	Basel (Switzerland)	2–2	(Czech Republic) Sparta Prague	Stadion Rankhof, Basel
14:30	Rossi 22' (1:0); Carignano 61' (2:1)	FCB summary	44' (1:1) Jun; 70' (2:2) Kováč	Attendance: 940; Referee: (Switzerland) Claudio Circhetta (Muttenz)
Note: FCB without Mandl (not in the squad), Yakin (lacking match fitness), Smiljanic and Mesbah (both injured); Prague without Pergl and Simunek (both injured). Fair game, no yellow cards. Corners: 6:6 (4:2).

26 February 2005 Mid-season	Basel (Switzerland)	11–0	(Switzerland) FC Liestal	St. Jakob-Areal, Basel
13:30	Carignano 7' (1:0); Sébastien Barberis 25' (2:0); Rossi 40' (3:0); Carignano 44' (4:0); Barberis 53' (5:0); Ergić 64' (6:0); Giménez 70' (7:0); Delgado 73' (8:0); Giménez 75' (9:0); Giménez 84' (10:0); Giménez 88' (11:0)	FCB summary		Attendance: 250; Referee: (Switzerland) Johan
Note: FCB without Huggel, P. Degen, Zwyssig, and Zuberbühler (all not selected); Yakin (rehabilitation training); and Petric and Smiljanic (both injured). 35th minute: a shot from Carignano hit the post; 78th minute: a shot from Gimenez hit the post. Tactical change from the 46th minute, Barberis moved to the right side of midfield, Ergić played centrally. Fair game, no yellow cards.

5 April 2005 Mid-season	Wohlen (Switzerland)	1–2	(Switzerland) Basel	Niedermatten, Wohlen
18:00	Berisha 56' (1:1)	FCB summary	36' (0:1) Giménez; 84' (1:2) Delgado	Attendance: 1,050; Referee: (Switzerland) Nikolaj Hänni (Staad)
Note: FCB without its Swiss national team players, also without Chipperfield and Carignano (rested), Petric and Yakin (injured)

17 May 2005 Mid-season	Solothurn (Switzerland)	1–5	(Switzerland) Basel	Stadion FC Solothurn, Solothurn
19:30	Koch 87' (1:5)	FCB summary	3' (pen. 0:1) Giménez; 22' (0:2) Giménez; 23' (0:3) Delgado; 33' (0:4) D. Degen; 58' (0:5) Rossi	Attendance: 2'450; Referee: (Switzerland) Markus Von Känel
Note: FCB without Huggel, Petric and Carignano (injured), as well as Chipperfield, P. Degen, Zwyssig and Meili (not in the squad).

=== Swiss Super League ===
==== First half of season ====
The Super League started on 17 July 2004 and the first half was to be completed on 11 December. The league season was originally contested by ten teams.

17 July 2004 Round 1	Basel	6–0	Aarau	St. Jakob-Park, Basel
19:30	Yakin 17' (pen.); Smiljanić 38' (2:0); Giménez 45' (3:0); Chipperfield (yellow card) 46'; Cantaluppi 53' (pen.) (Moretto) 61' (o.g.); P. Degen (yellow card) 67'; Chipperfield 74' (6:0)	FCB summary FCA summary	(yellow card) 19' Vardanyan; (yellow card) 25' (yellow-red card) 33' Christ; (yellow card) 90+3' Opango	Attendance: 24,430; Referee: (Switzerland) Guido Wildhaber (Kerzers)
Note: FCB without Ergic (was ill) and Carignano (a non-EU player who is surplus to requirements); Aarau without Bättig, Giallanza, Hasler and Simo (all injured), Bekiri (not yet eligible to play), as well as Bühler, Dugic and König (all away for the U19 European Championship). 15th minute: A shot by Smiljanic grazes the top of the crossbar. 85th minute: FCA goalkeeper Colomba deflected a shot from Degen onto the post. Super League debut for FCA youth player Dany Bolliger (18).

23 July 2004 Round 2	Basel	1–1	Xamax	St. Jakob-Park, Basel
19:30	Chipperfield (yellow card) 11'; Smiljanić 21' (1:0)	FCB summary	(yellow card) 28' Soufiani; (yellow card) 49' Cordonnier; (yellow card) 55' Zambaz; 80' (1:1) Margairaz	Attendance: 23,515; Referee: (Switzerland) Urs Meier (Wettingen and Würenlos)
Note: FCB without Ergic (was ill) and Carignano (a non-EU player left out of the squad due to quota limits). Neuchâtel Xamax without Daffe and Valente (both injured), as well as Jefferson and Tuti (neither of whom is yet eligible to play). 34th minute, a goal by Xamax player Rey was disallowed (offside). 51st minute, a header by M'Futi struck the inside of the post and bouced out clear. 83rd minute, a shot by Margairaz hit the underside of the crossbar and bounced clear.

30 July 2004 Round 3	Servette	1–2	Basel	La Praille, Lancy, Canton of Geneva,
20:00	Kader 41' (1:1); Alicarte (yellow card) 90'	FCB summary	8' (0:1) Chipperfield; 42' (1:2) Delgado; (yellow card) 44' D. Degen; (yellow card) 89' Rossi; (yellow card) 90' Huggel	Attendance: 12,300; Referee: (Switzerland) Reto Rutz (Amriswil)
Note: Servette were without Bah, Furo and Leonardo (all injured). FCB without Cantaluppi (injured), Ergic (was ill), and Sterjovski (a non-EU player deemed surplus to requirements).

6 August 2004 Round 4	Basel	2–1	Zürich	St. Jakob-Park, Basel
19:30	Giménez 16' (1:0); Delgado (yellow card) 27'; Chipperfield 48' (2:0); Cantaluppi (yellow card) 85'	FCB summary FCZ summary	(yellow card) 43'Nef; 75' (2:1) Petrosyan	Attendance: 27,835; Referee: (Switzerland) Markus Nobs (Wohlen bei Bern)
Note: FCB without Atouba (abroad until Sunday for transfer negotiations) and Ergic (longterm illness). FCZ without Bastida, Stanic and Yasar (all injured). 67th minute: A lobbed ball from Ilie hit the crossbar.

15 August 2004 Round 5	Young Boys	1–1	Basel	Stadion Neufeld, Bern
16:15	Urdaneta (yellow card) 23'; Chapuisat 23' (0:1); Rochat (yellow card) 60'; Magnin (yellow card) 76'	FCB summary	(yellow card) 26' Rossi; (yellow card) 51' Huggel; 48' (1:1) Carignano; (yellow card) 68' P. Degen	Attendance: 10,000; Referee: (Switzerland) René Rogalla (Wallisellen)
Note: YB without Berisha, Neri and Geiser (all injured), while Sermeter and Kehrli were both recovering from injury. Burki and Aziawonou were not in the squad. Patrick Bettoni made his debut for YB. FCB without Ergic and Murat Yakin (both ill) and Mesbah (injured). 29th minute, FCB goalkeeper Zuberbühler deflected a header from Häberli onto the crossbar and over the goal.

20 August 2004 Round 6	Basel	1–1	Schaffhausen	St. Jakob-Park, Basel
19:30	Cantaluppi (yellow card) 49'; Giménez 66' (1:0)	FCB summary	(yellow card) 41' Pesenti; (yellow card) 65'Sereinig; 75' (1:1) Bunjaku; (yellow card) 90+3' Leu	Attendance: 23,590; Referee: (Switzerland) Sascha Kever (Vezia)
Note: FCB without Mesbah (injured) and Ergic (longterm illness), Schaffhausen without Rizzo and Wild (both injured). 64th minute, a shot from Petric hit the post. 94th minute a header from Gimenez hit the post.

29 August 2004 Round 7	St. Gallen	0–1	Basel	Espenmoos, St. Gallen
16:15	Zellweger (yellow card) 39'	FCB summary	(yellow card) 25' Yakin; (yellow card) 36' Huggel; 62' (0:1) Giménez; (yellow card) 79' P. Degen	Attendance: 10,000; Referee: (Switzerland) Nicole Petignat (Courgenay)
Note: St. Gallen without Montandon, Akwuegbu and Merenda (all injured). FCB without Mesbah (injured), Ergic (longterm illness) and Cantaluppi (not in the squad). 8th minute, St. Gallen goalkeeper Razzetti tips a Degen shot onto the post. 62nd minute, a shot from Chipperfield hit the post; Gimenez converted the rebound to make it 0–1.

12 September 2004 Round 8	Basel	8–1	Grasshopper Club	St. Jakob-Park, Basel
16:15	Delgado 21' (1:0); Giménez 32' (2:0); Chipperfield (yellow card) 34'; Petrić 36' (3:0); Giménez 42' (4:0); Giménez 45' (5:0); Giménez 57' (6:0); Mesbah 86' (7:1); Carignano 89' (8:1)	FCB summary	(yellow card) 24' Jaggy; 73' (6:1) Rogério; (yellow card) 40' (yellow-red card) 87' Cabanas	Attendance: 27,816; Referee: (Switzerland) Jérôme Laperrière (Kerzers)
Note: FCB without Smiljanic (injured) and Ergic (longterm illness). GC without Castillo (suspended), as well as Jehle, Muff, Eduardo, Schwegler, and Spycher (all injured).

22 September 2004 Round 9	Thun	4–1	Basel	Stadion Lachen, Thun
19:30	Gerber 31' (1:1); Deumi (yellow card) 31'; Gerber 46' (2:1); Cerrone (yellow card) 58'; Raimondi 66' (3:1); Lustrinelli 87' (4:1)	FCB summary	23' (0:1) Petrić; (yellow card) 80' P. Degen	Attendance: 9,000; Referee: (Switzerland) Urs Meier (Wettingen and Würenlos)
Note: Thun without Sinani and Milicevic (both injured). FCB without Carignano (injured) and Ergic (recovering). 39th minute, a goal by Petric is disallowed due to offside.

25 September 2004 Round 10	Aarau	1–0	Basel	Stadion Brügglifeld, Aarau
19:30	Varela 6' (1:0); Varela (yellow card) 68'; Opango (yellow card) 70'	FCB summary FCA summary	(yellow card) 15' Degen; (yellow card) 35' Kléber	Attendance: 7,200; Referee: (Switzerland) Carlo Bertolini (Vira-Gambarogno)
Note: FCA without Vanetta (suspended), Moretto, and Tcheutchoua (both injured). FCB without Philipp Degen (suspended), Carignano, Chipperfield (both injured) and Ergic (longterm illness). 23rd minute, a shot from David Degen hit the underside of the crossbar and bounced clear. 24th minute, a goal by Mesbah was disallowed for offside. 92nd minute, a shot from David Degen hit the post.

3 October 2004 Round 11	Xamax	1–2	Basel	Centre Sportif de la Charrière, La Chaux-de-Fonds
14:30	Oppliger (yellow card) 47'; M'Futi 71' (1:2)	FCB summary	33' (0:1) Yakin; 51' (0:2) Petrić; (yellow card) 47' Smiljanić	Attendance: 9,100; Referee: (Switzerland) Massimo Busacca (Monte Carasso/Bellinzona)
Note: Xamax played their home games in la Charrière between July 2004 and February 2007 while the old Stade de la Maladière was demolished and the new stadium was constructed on the same site. Xamax without Cordonnier and Rey (both suspended), as well as Daffe, Tutti, Margairaz and Jefferson (all injured). FCB were without Chipperfield (injured) and Ergic (longterm illness).

16 October 2004 Round 12	Basel	2–1	Servette	St. Jakob-Park, Basel
19:30	Giménez 40' (1:1); Petrić 59' (2:1)	FCB summary	16' (0:1) Joao Paolo; (yellow card) 27' Joao Paolo	Attendance: 24,754; Referee: (Switzerland) Philippe Leuba (Chexbres)
Note: FCB without Murat Yakin (injured) and Ergic (longterm illness). Servette without Alicarte, Bah, Baltazar and Lombardo (all injured).

31 October 2004 Round 13	Zürich	0–0	Basel	Letzigrund, Zürich
16:15	Tararache (yellow card) 28'; Petrosyan (yellow card) 90+1'; César (yellow card) 90+2'	FCB summary FCZ summary	(yellow card) 60' Giménez; (red card) 88' Chipperfield; (yellow card) 90+2' Degen	Attendance: 19,200 (sold out); Referee: (Switzerland) Guido Wildhaber (Kerzers)
Note: FCZ without Keita, Di Jorio and Nef (all suspended), as well as Abdi and Stanic (both injured) and Bastida (not in the squad). FCB without Delgado and Murat Yakin (both injured) and Ergic (longterm illness).

7 November 2004 Round 14	Basel	2–1	Young Boys	St. Jakob-Park, Basel
16:00	Sterjovski 12' (1:0); Giménez 52' (pen. 2:1)	FCB summary	32' (1:1) Neri; (yellow card) 27' Rochat; (red card) 90+2' Friedli	Attendance: 26,860; Referee: (Switzerland) Massimo Busacca (Monte Carasso/Bellinzona)
Note: FCB without Chipperfield and Huggel (both suspended), Yakin (injured), and Ergic (longterm illness). YB without Häberli (suspended), De Napoli, Coubagéat, Eugster, Berisha, Wölfli, Maksimovic, Carreño, Kehrli (all injured), Sermeter and Magnin (both ill). 64th minute, a shot from Rossi hit the crossbar.

14 November 2004 Round 15	Schaffhausen	1–0	Basel	Stadion Breite, Schaffhausen
16:15	D. Degen 68' (o.g. 1:0); Bunjaku (yellow card) 69'	FCB summary	(yellow card) 76' Smiljanić; (yellow card) 87' Delgado; (yellow card) 89' Rossi	Attendance: 7,250; Referee: (Switzerland) Cyril Zimmermann (Bolligen)
Note: Schaffhausen without Senn (injured). FCB without Yakin (injured), Huggel (suspended) and Ergic (longterm illness). 4th minute, a header from Rossi hit the crossbar.

28 November 2004 Round 16	Basel	1–0	St. Gallen	St. Jakob-Park, Basel
16:15	Carignano 22' (1:0); Rossi (yellow card) 64'	FCB summary	(yellow card) 6' Fábio; (yellow card) 27' Obradović; (yellow card) 46' Zellweger; (yellow card) 55' Alex; (yellow card) 57' Akwuegbu	Attendance: 20,397; Referee: Gerald Lehner, Austria
Note: This match was played as part of the interaction referee exchange between the Swiss Football Association and the Austrian Football Association. FCB without Mesbah, Delgado, Petric and Yakin (all injured) as well as Ergic (longterm illness). St. Gallen without Agouda (injured). 23rd minute, a goal by Philipp Degen was disallowed (alleged offside). 88th minute, a goal by Schicker disallowed (alleged offside).

5 December 2004 Round 17	Grasshopper Club	2–3	Basel	Hardturm, Zürich
16:15	Spycher (yellow card) 15'; Muff 48' (1:3); Muff (yellow card) 50'; Núñez 56' (2:3); Chihab (yellow card) 82'; Cabanas (yellow card) 88'	FCB summary	16' (0:1) Chipperfield; 20' (0:2) Giménez; (yellow card) 39' P. Degen; 41' (0:3) Huggel; (yellow card) 42' Chipperfield; (yellow card) 50' Zwyssig; (red card) 53' Giménez; (yellow card) 77' Kléber; (yellow card) 85' Zuberbühler	Attendance: 13,200; Referee: (Switzerland) Guido Wildhaber (Kerzers)
Note: GC without Villarreal (suspended), Eduardo and Schwegler (both injured), FCB without Rossi (suspended), Ergic (longterm illness), Petric, Mesbah, Yakin and Smiljanic (all injured).

11 December 2004 Round 18	Basel	3–3	Thun	St. Jakob-Park, Basel
19:30	Delgado 7' (1:1); Carignano 22' (2:1); Rossi 38' (3:1)	FCB summary	5' (0:1) Gerber; (yellow card) 28' Cerrone; (yellow card) 28' Deumi; 62' (3:2) Aegerter; 72' (3:3) Raimondi	Attendance: 23,677; Referee: (Switzerland) Urs Meier (Wettingen and Würenlos)
Note: FCB without Yakin, Smiljanic, Petric and Quennoz (all injured), Ergic (longterm illness), as well as Chipperfield and Gimenez (both suspended). Thun were without Sinani and Lustrinelli (both injured) and Milicevic (recovering). Referee Urs Meier retired after officiating 213 matches in the top division. Tactical change by FCB following Preisig’s injury (a strained thigh muscle) in the 9th minute, Philipp Degen moved to central defense, Barberis shifted to the right side of the defense and David Degen took up a position on the right wing.

==== Second half of season ====
On 4 February 2005 the parent company of Servette FC was declared bankrupt. It had run debts of over 10 million Swiss francs, having not paid the players since the previous November, and consequently the club suffered an exodus of players looking for paying clubs. As a consequence of the bankruptcy Servette FC had their license revoked, the club's second half matches were entirely cancelled. The second half of the season was therefore competed with only nine clubs. These each played another double round-robin schedule. Each of the nine clubs had played 34 matches at the end of the season. Thus stage started on 20 February and the season was to be completed on 28 May.

20 February 2005 Round 19	St. Gallen	3–1	Basel	Espenmoos, St. Gallen
14:15	Hassli 19' (1:0); Zellweger (yellow card) 26'; Montandon (yellow card) 41'; Hassli 52' (2:0); Hassli (yellow card) 52'; Imhof (yellow card) 56'; Montandon 70' (3:1)	FCB summary	(yellow card) 35' Huggel; (yellow card) 53' Sterjovski; 58' (2:1) Petrić	Attendance: 8,000; Referee: (Switzerland) Carlo Bertolini (Vira-Gambarogno)
Note: St. Gallen without Fabinho (suspended) and Agouda (injured). FCB without Gimenez (suspended) as well as Murat Yakin, Smiljanic and Mesbah (all injured). 76th minute, Petrić, who had been substituted in 18 minutes earlier, was substituted out injured.

27 February 2005 Round 20	Basel	Cancelled	Servette	St. Jakob-Park, Basel

2 March 2005 Round 21	Xamax	P–P	Basel	Stade Charrière, La Chaux-de-Fonds
Note: Xamax played their home games in la Charrière between July 2004 and February 2007 while the old Stade de la Maladière was demolished and the new stadium was constructed on the same site. The match was postponed and rescheduled due to the pitch being snow covered.

6 March 2005 Round 22	Basel	4–1	Grasshopper Club	St. Jakob-Park, Basel
16:15	Quennoz (yellow card) 16'; Carignano 26' (1:1); Chipperfield (red card) 51'; Giménez 53' (pen. 2:1); Zwyssig 58' (3:1); Rossi 87' (4:1)	FCB summary	(red card) 3' Seoane; 24' (0:1) (yellow card) 56' Muff; (yellow card) 51' Lichtsteiner; (yellow card) 52' Stepanovs; (yellow card) 63' Hleb	Attendance: 21,078; Referee: (Switzerland) Massimo Busacca (Monte Carasso/Bellinzona)
Note: FCB without Huggel (suspended), Petric, Smiljanic, Sterjovski, and Murat Yakin (all injured), as well as Ergic (longterm illness). GC without Spycher (suspended), and Eduardo, Schwegler and Touré (all injured).

13 March 2005 Round 23	Thun	3–0	Basel	Stadion Lachen, Thun
14:15	Gelson 18' (1:0); Cerrone (yellow card) 22'; Lustrinelli 73' (2:0); Lustrinelli 80' (3:0)	FCB summary		Attendance: 4,750; Referee: (Switzerland) Reto Rutz (Amriswil)
Note: Thun without Sinani (injured) and Ojong (surplus foreign player). FCB without Chipperfield (suspended), and Petric, Sterjovski, Murat Yakin and Smiljanic (all injured). 19th minute: a shot from Baykal hit the top of the crossbar.

16 March 2005 Round 24	Basel	4–3	Schaffhausen	St. Jakob-Park, Basel
19:30	Chipperfield 19' (1:0); Carignano 39' (2:0); Kléber 50' (3:0); Delgado 63' (4:1); Chipperfield (yellow card) 90'	FCB summary	(yellow card) 40' Tsawa; 56' (3:1) Todisco; (yellow card) 57' Sereinig; 79' (4:2) Rizzo; (yellow card) 84' Todisco; 90' (4:2) Todisco	Attendance: 19,212; Referee: (Switzerland) René Rogalla (Wallisellen)
Note: FCB without Petric, Smiljanic, Sterjovski, and Yakin (all injured); Schaffhausen at full strength.

20 March 2005 Round 25	Zürich	2–2	Basel	Letzigrund, Zürich
16:15	Margairaz 59' (1:0); Nef (yellow card) 85'; Cesar 90+3' (pen. 2:2)	FCB summary FCZ summary	(yellow card) 61' Kléber; (yellow card) 65' Zwyssig; 76' (1:1) Delgado; (yellow card) 81' P. Degen; 87' (1:2) Huggel; (yellow card) 90+2' Sterjovski	Attendance: 13,200; Referee: (Switzerland) Martin Salm (Veltheim, Aargau)
Note: FCZ without Tarone, Stanic, Petrosjan, Hohl and Capria (all injured). FCB without Yakin, Smiljanic, Rossi and Petric (all injured).

2 April 2005 Round 26	Basel	4–2	Aarau	St. Jakob-Park, Basel
19:30	Huggel 49' (1:2); Giménez 50' (2:2); Carignano 53' (3:2); Carignano (yellow card) 53'; Zanni (yellow card) 60'; Zanni 62' (4:2)	FCB summary FCA summary	22' (0:1) Menezes; 39' (0:2) Giallanza	Attendance: 24,393; Referee: (Switzerland) Carlo Bertolini (Vira-Gambarogno)
Note: FCB without Chipperfield (suspended), as well as Petric and Yakin (both injured). FCA without Bekiri, Christ, Colomba, König, Schenker, Schmid, Simo and Wardanjan (all injured), along with Bättig (suspended). A minute of silence was observed for the late former FCB president and national team delegate, Harry Thommen. 50th minute, a shot from Carignano struck the crossbar and Gimenez scored from the rebound to make it 2–2. 61st minute, Carignano left the pitch due to injury. 63rd minute, a shot from David Degen hit the post.

10 April 2005 Round 27	Young Boys	2–5	Basel	Stadion Neufeld, Bern
16:15	Müller 50' (o.g. 1:3); Chapuisat 79' (pen. 2:4) de Napoli (yellow card) 74'	FCB summary	(yellow card) 11' Kléber; 13' (0:1) Zanni; 30' (0:2) Delgado; 41' (0:3) Delgado; (yellow card) 42' Huggel; (yellow card) 46' P. Degen; (yellow card) 69'Smiljanić; 74' (1:4) Giménez; 88' (2:5) D. Degen; (yellow card) 90' Zwyssig	Attendance: 10,550; Referee: (Switzerland) Guido Wildhaber (Kerzers)
Note: YB without Magnin (suspended), Coubageat and Aziawonou (both injured), and Berisha (recovering). FCB without Chipperfield (suspended) Murat Yakin, Petric and Carignano (all injured). 8th minute, a clearance attempt from Disler hits his own goalpost. 85th minute, a shot from Gimenez hits the goalpost.

17 April 2005 Round 28	Basel	1–1	Young Boys	St. Jakob-Park, Basel
16:00	Zwyssig (yellow card) 35'; Zanni (yellow card) 41'; Delgado 63' (1:1)	FCB summary	2' (0:1) Steinsson; (yellow card) 29' Carreño; (yellow card) 44' Urdaneta; (yellow card) 90' Knez	Attendance: 25,961; Referee: (Switzerland) Philippe Leuba (Chexbres)
Note: FCB without Kleber (suspended), as well as Petric, Carignano and Murat Yakin (all injured). YB without Häberli and Kehrli (both suspended), as well as Eugster, Coubagéat and Berisha (all injured).

20 April 2005 Round 29	Aarau	0–5	Basel	Stadion Brügglifeld, Aarau
19:30	Stöckli (yellow card) 15'; Simo (yellow card) 17'; Inler (yellow card) 24'; Schmid (yellow card) 37'	FCB summary FCA summary	14' (0:1) Smiljanić; 16' (pen.) Giménez; 33' (0:3) Giménez; (yellow card) 61' Chipperfield; 77' (0:4) Giménez; 90' (0:5) Giménez	Attendance: 5,700; Referee: (Switzerland) Sascha Kever (Vezia)
Note: FCA without Colomba, Christ, Wardanjan and Bättig (all injured), Bekiri (was ill), Opango (suspended), and Varela and Vanetta (both excused from duty). Giallanza acted as captain. FCB without Zwyssig (suspended), and Carignano, Petric and Murat Yakin (all injured). 89th minute, a shot from Bieli hit the post.

24 April 2005 Round 30	Basel	3–2	Zürich	St. Jakob-Park, Basel
16:15	Rossi (yellow card) 43'; Barberis (yellow card) 45'; Giménez 55' (1:2); Giménez 50' (2:2); Giménez (penalty missed) 59′ Smiljanić 75' (3:2)	FCB summary FCZ summary	3' (0:1) Margairaz; 30' (0:2) Gygax; (yellow card) 38' Di Jorio; (yellow card) 56' Taini; (yellow card) 61' Džemaili	Attendance: 25,768; Referee: (Switzerland) Massimo Busacca (Monte Carasso/Bellinzona)
Note: FCB without Carignano, Huggel and Petric (all injured), and Yakin (played with the reserve team on the day before). FCZ without Akalahia, Capria, Stanic, Hohl, Petrosjan and Schneider (all injured), as well as Abdi and César (both suspended). 3rd minute, a shot from Margairaz hit the post. 59th minute, the ball was shot wide of the goal by Gimenez, with the penalty awarded following a foul.

1 May 2005 Round 31	Schaffhausen	0–2	Basel	Stadion Breite, Schaffhausen
14:30	Yasar (yellow card) 45'	FCB summary	(yellow card) 33' Rossi; 45' (0:1) Rossi; (yellow card) 45' Kléber; 53' (0:2) Giménez; (yellow card) 56' P. Degen	Attendance: 5,200; Referee: (Switzerland) Bruno Grossen
Note: Schaffhausen without Bunjaku and Dos Santos (both injured), as well as Leu and Pesenti (both suspended). FCB without Carignano, Huggel and Petric (all injured), and Murat Yakin (recovering).

4 May 2005 Round 21	Xamax	0–4	Basel	Centre Sportif de la Charrière, La Chaux-de-Fonds
18:45		FCB summary	2' (0:1) Delgado; 14' (0:2) Giménez; 21' (0:3) Giménez; 39' (0:4) Giménez	Attendance: 4,500; Referee: (Switzerland) Markus Nobs (Wohlen bei Bern)
Note: Xamax played their home games in la Charrière between July 2004 and February 2007 while the old Stade de la Maladière was demolished and the new stadium was constructed on the same site. The match was originally scheduled for 2 March, but due to bad weather was rescheduled. Xamax without Rey (suspended), Von Bergen (injured), and Maraninchi (not in the squad). FCB without Philipp Degen (suspended), as well as Carignano, Huggel, Petric and Yakin (all injured).

7 May 2005 Round 32	Basel	4–1	Thun	St. Jakob-Park, Basel
18:45	Rossi 41' (pen. 1:0); Delgado 56' (2:0); Rossi 80' (pen. 3:1); Zanni (yellow card) 90'; Smiljanić 90+3' (4:1)	FCB summary	(yellow card) 26' Cerrone; (yellow card) 31' Gerber; (yellow card) 31' Ojong; 72' (2:1) Renggli; (yellow card) 75' Miličević; (yellow card) 75' Ferreira	Attendance: 31,383; Referee: (Switzerland) Nicole Petignat (Courgenay)
Note: FCB without Philipp Degen (suspended), Huggel, Petric, Yakin, Carignano and Gimenez (all injured). Thun without Baykal (suspended), Sinani and Pallas (both injured).

11 May 2005 Round 33	Basel	3–1	St. Gallen	St. Jakob-Park, Basel
19:30	Giménez 28' (1:1); P. Degen (yellow card) 63'; Giménez 86' (2:1); Giménez (yellow card) 88'; Rossi 90' (pen- 3:1)	FCB summary	13' (0:1) Alex; (yellow card) 57' Pavlović; (yellow card) 85' Fábio	Attendance: 25,099; Referee: (Switzerland) Martin Salm (Veltheim, Aargau)
Note: FCB without Zanni (suspended), as well as Huggel, Petric and Carignano (all injured). St. Gallen without Wolf and Agouda (both injured). FCB player Yakin makes his first appearance following a seven-month injury layoff. 25th minute, Zellweger left the pitch due to injury. 45th minute, Callà deflects a header from Gimenez onto the crossbar. 68th minute:, a shot from Callà hit the crossbar.

15 May 2005 Round 34	Servette	Cancelled	Basel	La Praille, Lancy, Canton of Geneva,

21 May 2005 Round 35	Grasshopper Club	4–1	Basel	Hardturm, Zürich
17:30	Rogério 7' (1:0); Cabanas 29' (2:0); Chihab 42' (3:0); Touré 86' (4:1); Mitreski (yellow card) 90+2'	FCB summary	72' (3:1) Delgado; (yellow card) 77' Zanni	Attendance: 13,200; Referee: (Switzerland) Guido Wildhaber (Kerzers)
Note: GC without Stepanovs (suspended), as well as Seoane, Muff, Eduardo and Senesie (all injured). GC player Lichtsteiner (who had signed with Lille) was officially bid farewell. FCB without Huggel, Petric and Carignano (all injured).

28 May 2005 Round 36	Basel	2–0	Xamax	St. Jakob-Park, Basel
20:15	Yakin 40' (1:0); Ergić 77' (2:0)	FCB summary		Attendance: 28,012; Referee: (Switzerland) Massimo Busacca (Monte Carasso/Bellinzona)
Note: FCB without Carignano, Huggel, and Petric (all injured) and Müller (was ill). Neuchâtel Xamax without Rey (injured).

==== Final league table ====
Pos	Team	Pld	W	D	L	GF	GA	GD	Pts	Qualification or relegation
1	Basel	34	21	7	6	81	45	+36	70	Swiss champions qualification to Champions League third qualifying round
2	Thun	34	18	6	10	69	42	+27	60	qualification to Champions League second qualifying round
3	Grasshopper Club	34	12	14	8	51	50	+1	50	qualification to UEFA Cup second qualifying round
4	Young Boys	34	12	13	9	60	52	+8	49	entered Intertoto Cup second round
5	Zürich	34	13	9	12	55	57	−2	48	Swiss Cup winners qualification to UEFA Cup second qualifying round (Note: Qualified as 2004–05 Swiss Cup winners)
6	Xamax	34	10	8	16	36	48	−12	38	entered Intertoto Cup first round
7	St. Gallen	34	8	12	14	51	60	−9	36	
8	Aarau	34	7	11	16	42	64	−22	32	
9	Schaffhausen	34	7	11	16	36	59	−23	32	qualification to relegation play-off
10	Servette (Note: Servette were docked three points for financial irregularities.) (R)	18	6	5	7	24	28	−4	20	relegated to 2005–06 1. Liga (Note: Servette went bankrupt during the winter break and did not play the second half of the season. Restart in the 3rd level (1. Liga) in 2005/06)

Source: RSSSF
Rules for classification: 1) points; 2) goal difference; 3) number of goals scored.
(R) Relegated

=== Swiss Cup ===
This season's Swiss Cup was the 80th edition of the annual cup competition. It began on 17/18/19 September with the games of Round 1 and ended on 16 May 2005 with the final held at St. Jakob-Park, Basel. The winners earned a place in the second qualifying round of the UEFA Cup. Teams from Super League and Challenge League were seeded in the first round. In a match, the home advantage was granted to the team from the lower league, if applicable.

18 September 2004 Round 1	FC Oberdorf	0–4	Basel	z' Hof, Oberdorf
17:00		FCB summary	3' (0:1) Rossi; 23' (0:2) Rossi; 69' (0:3) Sterjovski; 69' (0:4) D. Degen	Attendance: 5,100 (stadium record) temporory stands were built Referee: (Switzerland) Martin Salm (Veltheim, Aargau)
Note: FC Oberdorf played the 2004/05 season in the 2. Liga regional (fifth-tier). Oberdorf without Mundschin (injured). FCB without Carignano, Chipperfield and Delgado (all injured), Ergic (longterm illness), as well as Huggel, Murat Yakin and Zuberbühler (all rested). 13th minute, a shot from Rossi hit the outside of the post. 26th minute, a shot from Rossi hit the inside of the post. 80th minute: Smilanic headed the ball against the crossbar.

24 October 2004 Round 2	Meyrin	1–3	Basel	Stade de Bois-Carré, Meyrin
15:30	Njanke (yellow card) 35'; Petrini 45' (1:1); Diouf (yellow card) 82'	FCB summary	11' (0:1) Rossi; 69' (1:2) Giménez; 76' (1:3) Giménez	Attendance: 3,145 (record attendance) temporory stands were built Referee: (Switzerland) Jérôme Laperrière (Kerzers)
Note: Meyrin without Ansah (absent), as well as Gil, Wohlschlag and N'Togué (all injured); FCB without Yakin (injured) and Ergic (longterm illness). 29th minute, Delgado was substitued out due to an injury.

20 November 2004 Round 3	Thun	1–1 (a.e.t.) (4–3 p)	Basel	Stadion Lachen, Thun
17:30	Raimondi 57' (1:0); Hodžić (yellow card) 98'	FCB summary	(yellow card) 42' D. Degen; 67' (1:1) Rossi; (yellow card) 90' P. Degen	Attendance: 5,000; Referee: (Switzerland) Nicole Petignat (Courgenay)
	Penalties
	Zanni (penalty scored); Renggli (penalty scored); Carlos (penalty scored); Raimondi (penalty missed); Baykal (penalty scored)		(penalty scored) Giménez; (penalty missed) Smiljanić; (penalty scored) Rossi; (penalty scored) Carignano; (penalty missed) Sterjovski
Note: Thun without Lustrinelli and Sinani (both injured) and Milicevic (recovering). FCB without Petric, Yakin and Mesbah (all injured), Huggel (suspended), and Ergic (recovering). 93rd minute, a shot by Gimenez hit the crossbar.

Thun advanced to the quarter-finals, but here were defeated by the Young Boys. In the final Zürich beat Luzern 3–1 and qualified for the 2005–06 UEFA Cup second qualifying round. This was Zürich's seventh cup win to this date.

=== UEFA Champions League ===
For more information, see 2004–05 UEFA Champions League

==== Third qualifying round ====
11 August 2004 1st Leg	Basel (Switzerland)	1–1	(Italy) Internazionale	St. Jakob-Park, Basel
20:45	Cantaluppi (yellow card) 23'; Huggel 25' (1:1); Yakin (yellow card) 58'; Smiljanić (yellow card) 87'	UEFA summary FCB summary	19' (0:1) Adriano; (yellow card) 30' Stanković	Attendance: 29,500 (sold out); Referee: (England) Graham Poll
Note: FCB without Ergic and Quennoz (both ill), as well as Mesbah and Rapo (both left out of the squad). Inter without Vieri, Martins, Cannavaro, Davids and Cristiano Zanetti (all injured), Kily Gonzalez (at the Olympic Games), Mihajlovic (suspended), and Van der Meyde (left out of the squad). 28th minute, a shot from Stankovic hit the post. 38th minute, a shot from Ze Maria hit the crossbar. 79th minute, a shot from Huggel hit the post. 81st minute: Murat Yakin clears a free kick from Ze Maria off the goal line with his head.

25 August 2004 2nd Leg	Internazionale (Italy)	4–1 (5–2 agg.)	(Switzerland) Basel	San Siro, Milan
21:00	Adriano 1' (1:0); Stanković 12' (2:0); Adriano 52' (3:1); Álvaro Recoba 59' (4:1); Álvaro Recoba (yellow card) 60'; Edgar Davids (yellow card) 82'	UEFA summary FCB summary	(yellow card) 32' Huggel; 49' (2:1) Sterjovski; (yellow card) 73' P. Degen	Attendance: 50,000; Referee: (Sweden) Anders Frisk
Note: Inter without Mihajlovic (ineligible), Cannavaro, Martins, and Cristiano Zanetti (all injured). FCB without Ergic (longterm illness).

F.C. Internazionale Milano won 5–2 on aggregate. Teams that were eliminated in the third qualifying round advanced to the UEFA Cup first round

=== UEFA Cup ===
==== First round ====
16 September 2004 1st Leg	Terek Grozny (Russia)	1–1	(Switzerland) Basel	Lokomotiv Stadium (Moscow)
18:00	Fedkov 38' (1:0); Ajinjal (yellow card) 54'	UEFA summary FCB summary	(yellow card) 29' Rossi; (yellow card) 36' Yakin; 57' (1:1) Giménez	Attendance: 4,000; Referee: (Norway) Tommy Skjerven
Note: FCB without Delgado and Carignano (both injured), Ergic (longterm illness). 4th minute: a header by Gimenez hit the post. 1,100 security personnel in the stadium. 100 tickets sold in advance.

30 September 2004 2nd Leg	Basel (Switzerland)	2–0 (3–1 agg.)	(Russia) Terek Grozny	St. Jakob-Park, Basel
20:15	Rossi 11' (1:0); Petrić (yellow card) 35'; Kléber 89' (2:0)	UEFA summary FCB summary	(yellow card) 27' Ajinjal; (yellow card) 48' Teryokhin	Attendance: 15,895; Referee: (Greece) Georgios Douros
Note: FCB without Sterjovski (not in the squad/expected the arrival of a child), Ergic (longterm illness).

Basel won 3–1 on aggregate and advanced to the group stage.

==== Group stage ====
===== Group A matches =====
21 October 2004 Matchday one	Schalke 04 (Germany)	1–1	(Switzerland) Basel	Arena AufSchalke, Gelsenkirchen
20:30	Kobiaschwili 8' (1:0); Altıntop (yellow card) 42'; Hanke (yellow card) 88'	UEFA summary FCB summary	(yellow card) 30' Huggel; (yellow card) 66' Smiljanić; (yellow card) 70' Kléber; (yellow card) 79' D. Degen; 82' (1:1) Delgado	Attendance: 52,870; Referee: (Belgium) Johan Verbist
Note: Schalke without Böhme and Lamotte (both injured), Basel without Murat Yakin (injured) and Ergic (longterm illness).

25 November 2004 Matchday three	Basel (Switzerland)	1–2	(Scotland) Hearts	St. Jakob-Park, Basel
20:15	Giménez (yellow card) 65'; Carignano 76' (1:1)	UEFA summary FCB summary	31' (0:1) Wyness; 89' (1:2) Neilson	Attendance: 21,645; Referee: (Iceland) Kristinn Jakobsson
Note: FCB without Murat Yakin, Petric and Mesbah (all injured), as well as Ergic (longterm illness).

1 December 2004 Matchday four	Ferencvárosi (Hungary)	1–2	(Switzerland) Basel	Ferenc Puskás Stadium, Budapest
20:45	Huszti (penalty missed) 22′ Rósa 22' (1:0); Huszti (yellow card) 27'; Kapic (yellow card) 34'; Zováth (yellow card) 38'; (penalty missed) 86′	UEFA summary FCB summary	(yellow card) 52' Quennoz; (yellow card) 53' P. Degen; 59' (1:1) Rossi; (yellow card) 67' Zwyssig; (yellow card) 68' Rossi; 79' (1:2) Huggel; (yellow card) 82' Chipperfield; (yellow card) 86' D. Degen	Attendance: 22,000; Referee: (Ukraine) Vitaliy Hodulian
Note: FCB without Yakin, Petric and Mesbah (all injured) and Ergic (recovering). 22nd minute, FCB goalkeeper Zuberbühler saved the penalty awarded for a foul, shot by Huszti, Rosa scored from the second rebound. 86th minute, Ferencvárosi goalkeeper Szücs took the penalty and shot the ball wide of the target with a penalty awarded for a handball.

16 December 2004 Matchday five	Basel (Switzerland)	1–0	(Netherlands) Feyenoord	St. Jakob-Park, Basel
20:45	Carignano 53' (1:0)	UEFA report FCB summary	(yellow card) 79' Smolarek; (yellow card) 89' Bosschaart	Attendance: 25,660; Referee: (Spain) Carlos Megía Dávila
Note: FCB without Ergic (longterm illness), as well as Petric, Yakin, Kleber and Smiljanic (all injured). Feyenoord without Ono and Saidi (both rested). 7th minute, a goal by Sterjovski was disallowed for offside. 19th minute: a goal by Gimenez was incorrectly disallowed for offside.

===== Group table =====
Pos	Team	Pld	W	D	L	GF	GA	GD	Pts	Qualification	FEY	SCH	BSL	FER	HOM
1	(Netherlands) Feyenoord	4	2	1	1	6	3	+3	7	Advance to knockout stage	—	2–1	—	—	3–0
2	(Germany) Schalke 04	4	2	1	1	5	3	+2	7	Advance to knockout stage	—	—	1–1	2–0	—
3	(Switzerland) Basel	4	2	1	1	5	4	+1	7	Advance to knockout stage	1–0	—	—	—	1–2
4	(Hungary) Ferencváros	4	1	1	2	3	5	−2	4		1–1	—	1–2	—	—
5	(Scotland) Heart of Midlothian	4	1	0	3	2	6	−4	3		—	0–1	—	0–1	—

Source: RSSSF

==== Round of 32 ====
17 February 2005 1st Leg	Basel (Switzerland)	0–0	(France) Lille OSC	St. Jakob-Park, Basel
20:30		UEFA summary FCB summary	(yellow card) 16' Debuchy; (yellow card) 69' Chalmé; (yellow card) 88' Brunel; (yellow card) 90' Cabaye	Attendance: 19,092; Referee: (Bulgaria) Anton Genov
Note: FCB without Yakin, Smiljanic and Mesbah (all injured) and Ergic (ineligible). Lille without Schmitz (suspended), as well as Landrin and Makoun (both injured).

24 February 2005 2nd Leg	Lille OSC (France)	2–0 (2–0 agg.)	(Switzerland) Basel	Stadium Nord Lille Métropole, Lille
21:00	Moussilou 37' (1:0); Ačimovič 78' (pen. 2:0); Bodmer (yellow card) 87'	UEFA summary FCB summary	(yellow card) 78' P. Degen	Attendance: 12,000; Referee: (Portugal) Pedro Proença
Note: Lille without Brunel (suspended) and Makoun (injured). FCB without Yakin, Smiljanic and Petric (all injured), and Ergic (ineligible).

Lille OSC won 2–0 on aggregate and advanced to the next round, but here they were eliminated by Auxerre.

== See also ==
- History of FC Basel
- List of FC Basel players
- List of FC Basel seasons

== Sources ==
- Rotblau: Jahrbuch Saison 2015/2016. Publisher: FC Basel Marketing AG. ISBN 978-3-7245-2050-4
- Rotblau: Jahrbuch Saison 2017/2018. Publisher: FC Basel Marketing AG. ISBN 978-3-7245-2189-1
- Die ersten 125 Jahre / 2018. Publisher: Josef Zindel im Friedrich Reinhardt Verlag, Basel. ISBN 978-3-7245-2305-5
- Switzerland 2004–05 at RSSSF
