= 2005–06 Grasshopper Club Zurich season =

Grasshopper Club Zürich
2005-06 season
- Manager: (Switzerland) Hanspeter Latour (until 3 January) (Bulgaria) Krasimir Balakov (from 16 January)
- Stadium: Hardturm
- Swiss Super League: 4th
- UEFA Cup: Group stage

During the 2005–06 Swiss football season, Grasshopper Club Zürich competed in the Swiss Super League.

== Season summary ==
Manager Hanspeter Latour left in early January to take charge of German club Köln. Bulgarian legend Krasimir Balakov was appointed to replace him. Balakov led the Zürich club to 4th place, one place lower than the previous season.

== First-team squad ==
Squad at end of season

Note: Flags indicate national team as defined under FIFA eligibility rules; some limited exceptions apply. Players may hold more than one non-FIFA nationality.

No.	Pos.	Nation	Player
1	GK	SUI	Fabio Coltorti
2	DF	LVA	Igors Stepanovs
4	DF	SUI	Roland Schwegler
5	DF	MAR	Tariq Chihab
6	MF	SUI	Gerardo Seoane
7	FW	SEN	Demba Touré
8	MF	SUI	Michel Renggli
9	FW	SUI	André Muff
10	FW	BRA	Eduardo
11	FW	BRA	Rogério
13	DF	SUI	Luca Denicolà
14	MF	SUI	Dušan Pavlović
17	MF	DOM	Vladimir Peralta
18	GK	LIE	Peter Jehle

No.	Pos.	Nation	Player
19	DF	COL	Alexander Viveros
20	FW	BRA	Leandro Fonseca
23	MF	ESP	Raúl Cabanas
24	DF	SUI	Kim Jaggy (Note: Jaggy was born in Varen, Switzerland, but also qualifies to represent Haiti internationally and would make his international debut for Haiti in 2011.)
26	MF	MKD	Aleksandar Mitreski
27	DF	SUI	Kay Voser
29	DF	SUI	Marc Lütolf
30	MF	BRA	António dos Santos
31	FW	SUI	David Blumer
32	DF	SUI	Scott Sutter (Note: Sutter was born in Enfield, England, but also qualifies to represent Switzerland internationally through his father and represented them at U-21 level before making his international debut for Switzerland in September 2010.)
33	DF	PER	Leonel Romero (Note: Romero was born in Peru, but also qualifies to represent Switzerland internationally and would represent them at U-20 level.)
34	MF	SUI	Antonio Aiello
35	MF	SUI	Vero Salatić (Note: Salatić was born in Zvornik, Yugoslavia (now Bosnia and Herzegovina), but was raised in Switzerland and represented them at U-19, U-20, and U-21 level, and has expressed interest in representing Serbia or Bosnia and Herzegovina internationally.)

=== Left club during season ===
Note: Flags indicate national team as defined under FIFA eligibility rules; some limited exceptions apply. Players may hold more than one non-FIFA nationality.

No.	Pos.	Nation	Player
3	DF	SUI	Igor Hürlimann (to Neuchâtel Xamax)
15	MF	SUI	Ricardo Cabanas (Note: Cabanas was born in Zürich, Switzerland, but also qualifies to represent Spain internationally and has represented Galicia in unofficial matches.) (to Köln)

No.	Pos.	Nation	Player
17	FW	URU	Horacio Peralta
—	GK	SUI	Eldin Jakupović (Note: Jakupović was born in Prijedor, Yugoslavia (now Bosnia and Herzegovina), and represented them at U-21 level, but was raised in Switzerland and represented them at U-21 level before making his international debut for Switzerland in August 2008.) (to Thun)

== Results ==
=== UEFA Cup ===
==== Second qualifying round ====
11 August 2005	Grasshoppers (Switzerland)	1–0	(Poland) Wisła Płock	Hardturm, Zürich
19:30	Eduardo 68'	Report		Referee: Duarte Gomes (Portugal)

25 August 2005	Wisła Płock (Poland)	3–2	(Switzerland) Grasshoppers	Kazimierz Górski Stadium, Płock
18:00	Gęsior 35', 38'; Zilić 69'	Report	António 30'; Eduardo 83'	Referee: Egill Mar Markusson (Iceland)

3–3 on aggregate, Grasshoppers win on away goals

==== First round ====
15 September 2005	Grasshoppers (Switzerland)	1–1	(Finland) MyPa	Hardturm, Zürich
19:30	Salatić 1'	Report	Marco Manso 19'	Referee: Dougie McDonald (Scotland)

29 September 2005	MyPa (Finland)	0–3	(Switzerland) Grasshoppers	Pohjola Stadion, Vantaa
18:30		Report	Touré 75'; Salatić 80'; Rogério 86'	Referee: Vitaliy Godulyan (Ukraine)

Grasshoppers won 4-1 on aggregate.

==== Group stage ====
20 October 2005	Grasshoppers (Switzerland)	0–1	(England) Middlesbrough	Hardturm, Zürich
21:00		Report	Hasselbaink 10'	Attendance: 8,500; Referee: Espen Berntsen (Norway)

3 November 2005	Litex Lovech (Bulgaria)	2–1	(Switzerland) Grasshoppers	Lovech Stadium, Lovech
16:00	Novaković 13'; Sandrinho 81'	Report	António 90'	Attendance: 4,000; Referee: Georgios Kasnaferis (Greece)

30 November 2005	Grasshoppers (Switzerland)	2–3	(Ukraine) Dnipro Dnipropetrovsk	Hardturm, Zürich
20:45	Touré 85'; Renggli 90'	Report	Nazarenko 39'; Kravchenko 61'; Mykhaylenko 84'	Attendance: 1,800; Referee: Edo Trivković (Croatia)

15 December 2005	AZ (Netherlands)	1–0	(Switzerland) Grasshoppers	Alkmaarderhout, Alkmaar
20:45	Koevermans 70'	Report		Attendance: 8,153; Referee: Hervé Piccirillo (France)
