= Samuele Preisig =

Swiss footballer (born 1984)

Personal information
- Full name: Samuele Preisig
- Date of birth: 5 April 1984 (age 42)
- Place of birth: Switzerland
- Height: 1.88 m (6 ft 2 in)
- Position: Defender

Youth career
- 2003–05: FC Basel

Senior career*
Years	Team	Apps	(Gls)
2003–05	FC Basel U-21	42	(2)
2004–06	FC Basel	1	(0)
2005–06	→ FC Concordia Basel (loan)	33	(4)
2006–07	FC Aarau	12	(0)
2008–2012	AC Lugano	70	(6)
2012–2014	FC Mendrisio	27	(2)
2014–2016	AC Bellinzona		
2016–2017	SC Balerna		
- * Club domestic league appearances and goals

Samuele Preisig (born 5 April 1984) is a former footballer from Switzerland, who played as defender.

== Career ==
Preisig signed his first professional contract with FC Basel and joined their U-21 in the summer of 2003. He was called into their first team for some test games that year. One year later, he joined Basel's first team during the Autumn of their 2004–05 season under head coach Christian Gross. After playing in ten test games Preisig played his first team debut for the club in the Swiss Cup game on 18 September 2004 as Basel won 4–0 against local amateur club FC Oberdorf. He played his domestic league debut for the club in the home game in the St. Jakob-Park on 11 December as Basel played a three all draw with Thun. The game wasn't ideal for Preisig. He was called into the starting eleven, because Basel's three centre backs, Murat Yakin, Alexandre Quennoz and Boris Smiljanić were out with injuries. After just five minutes, Andres Gerber put the visitors 1–0 up - Preisig came too late. Just four minutes later, the 20-year-old had to leave the pitch with a thigh strain. In January 2005 Preisig prolonged his contract with the club and to obtain more playing experience, he was then loaned out to local club FC Concordia Basel, who at that time played in the Challenge League, the second tier of Swiss football.

After 18 months with Concordia, Preisig signed a contract with FC Aarau. With them he also played 18 months and then he moved on again. In January 2008 he signed with Lugano. He played five season for Lugano in the Challenge League. After this time he retired from professional football and joined amateur club FC Mendrisio in the fourth tier.

== Sources ==
- Die ersten 125 Jahre. Publisher: Josef Zindel im Friedrich Reinhardt Verlag, Basel. ISBN 978-3-7245-2305-5
- Verein "Basler Fussballarchiv" Homepage
