= Reto Zanni =

Swiss footballer (born 1980)

Personal information
- Full name: Reto Zanni
- Date of birth: 9 February 1980 (age 46)
- Place of birth: Stans, Switzerland
- Height: 1.88 m (6 ft 2 in)
- Positions: Right back; central defender

Youth career
- –1998: SC Buochs
- 1998–1999: Grasshopper Club

Senior career*
Years	Team	Apps	(Gls)
1999–2003	Grasshopper Club	45	(1)
2001–2002	→ FC St. Gallen (loan)	28	(1)
2003–2005	FC Thun	48	(4)
2005–2011	FC Basel	163	(5)
2011–2012	FC Vaduz	35	(0)
2012	SC Buochs	5	(0)
Total		324	(11)

International career
1998–1999	Switzerland U-18	5	(0)
1998–1999	Switzerland U-19	10	(1)
1999–2002	Switzerland U-21	23	(1)
- * Club domestic league appearances and goals

Reto Zanni (born 9 February 1980) is a Swiss former footballer who played mainly as right defender, but also as central defender.

== Football career ==
=== Grasshopper Club ===
Zanni played his youth football with local club SC Buochs and after his time at school he started his apprenticeship as office clerk. He was scouted by Grasshopper Club and in summer 1998 moved to their youth department, signing his first professional contract with them he interrupted his apprenticeship. He commenced his professional football in GC's U-21 team, where he played for one year, occasionally being called up into the first team, despite suffering a few injuries. He played his debut with the first team on 25 July 1998, coming on as a substitute against Lugano. In Spring 1999 he played the last four games of the season with the first team. In summer 1999 Zanni advanced definitely to GC's first team under head coach Roy Hodgson. He played well under Hodgson advancing to become regular player. He kept his place in the team, even after the change of coach to Hans-Peter Zaugg. He went on to play 45 times for the GC, scoring one goal, until in November 2000 he suffered an injury and was kept out of the game until the end of the season. At the end of the season GC won the league championship.

==== St. Gallen (loan) ====
During the 2001–02 season, Zanni was on loan at St. Gallen to obtain more playing experience. For St. Gallen he played 28 league games and four in the UEFA Cup.

==== Return to GC ====
After the loan period Zanni returning to the Grasshopper-Club. However, right to the beginning of the season he was diagnosed with a fatigue fracture and missed nearly the entire season due to the injury. GC became Swiss champions this season, but Zanni played just one game in the 2002–03 season. He left the Grasshopper-Club in 2003 after five years at the club.

=== Thun ===
He joined FC Thun in 2003 and there, under head coach Hanspeter Latour, he broke into the first team immediately. During his time at Thun, he rose to be one of the team's best players. He played well for one and a half seasons, until the end of 2004, and as Latour left the club Zanni also decided to leave.

=== Basel ===
==== Season 2004–05 ====
On 15 January 2005 FC Basel signed Zanni on a two-and-a-half-year contract with an option for a further year. He joined Basel's first team during the winter break of their 2004–05 season under head coach Christian Gross, who was in his sixth season with the club in that position and, under trainer Gross, Zanni played in the first team immediately. After playing in nine test games, he played his team debut in the round of 32 in the 2004–05 UEFA Cup, a home game in the St. Jakob-Park on 17 February 2005 as Basel played a goalless draw against Lille OSC. He played his domestic league debut for the club in the away game in the Espenmoos three days later, on 20 February, as Basel were defeated 3–1 by St. Gallen. Zanni scored his first goal for his new club in the home game in the St. Jakob-Park on 2 April 2005. It was the last goal of the game as Basel won 4–2 against Aarau.

Basel completed all the 2004–05 Super League season's seventeen home games undefeated, winning thirteen and drawing four. They ended the season as Swiss champions with 10 points advantage over second placed Thun.

==== Season 2005–06 ====
As Swiss champions, Basel entered the 2005–06 Champions League third qualifying round. However, they were drawn against German Bundesliga club Werder Bremen and they lost 4-2 on aggregate. Subsequently Basel dropped into the 2005–06 UEFA Cup, where against NK Široki Brijeg in the first round, they sealed a 6–0 aggregate win to qualify for the Group stage. Here Basel were then drawn into Group E, alongside Strasbourg, Roma, Red Star Belgrade and Tromsø. Basel qualified for the knock-out stage and in the round of 32 Basel were drawn against AS Monaco, this was won 2-1 on aggregate. In the round of 16 Basel were drawn against Strasbourgh winning 4-2 on aggregate. In the quarter-finals, drawn against Middlesbrough they won the first leg 2–0, but Middlesbrough fought back to win the return match 4–1 and the tie 4–3 on aggregate. Zanni played in all 14 European games.

Basel started the season well and led the championship right until the last day of the league campaign. On the final day of the league season Basel played at home against Zürich. A last-minute goal from Zürich's Iulian Filipescu meant the final score was 1-2 in favour of the away team and it gave FCZ their first national championship since 1980–81. The title for Basel was lost on goal difference. Zanni played in all 36 league matches over 90 minutes.

==== Season 2006–07 ====
The next season Basel's European campaign started in the first qualifying stage of the 2006–07 UEFA Cup, here they beat Kazakhi side FC Tobol 3–1 on aggregate. In the second qualifying round they were drawn against FC Vaduz from Liechtenstein, narrowly progressing on the away goals rule after a 2–2 aggregate draw. In the first round Basel won 7–2 on aggregate against FK Rabotnički to qualified for the group stage. Here Basel played their first match at home against Feyenoord, this ended in a 1–1 draw. Their second was away and FCB lost 3–0 against Blackburn Rovers. At home against AS Nancy the match was drawn 2–2 and the final game ended with a 3–1 defeat against Wisła Kraków. Basel ended the group stage in last position in the table and were eliminated. Zanni played in all of the 12 matches over 90 minutes.

At the end of the 2006–07 Super League season Basel were runners-up, one point behind championship winners Zürich. Zanni was shown the yellow card 10 times this season, which meant that he missed two of the 36 league matches due to suspension. In the Swiss Cup Basel advanced to the final, beating FC Liestal in the first round, Lugano, FC Baulmes, Aarau and Wil in the semi-final. In the final they played Luzern and won this 1–0 thanks to a penalty goal in the third minute of added time.

==== Season 2007–08 ====
Basel played in the 2007–08 UEFA Cup. Winning both matches in the qualification round and both matches in the play-off round, they team advanced to the group stage, which they ended undefeated in second position, after playing 1–0 at home against Stade Rennes, 0–0 away against Dinamo Zagreb, 1–0 at home against Brann and 1–1 away against Hamburger SV, to continue the knockout stage. In the match against HSV in the Volksparkstadion on 20 December 2007, Zanni was dismissed on 48 minutes for a second bookable foul. But then they were eliminated here by Sporting CP. Zanni missed the first leg due to the suspension.

In the league match on 19 August 2007, Zanni was shown a direct red card after pulling down Demba Touré, in the match that Grasshopper Club won 2–0. At the end of the 2007–08 season he won the Double with the club. They won the League Championship title with four points advantage over second placed Young Boys.

In the Swiss Cup via FC Léchelles, SC Binningen, Grasshopper Club, Stade Nyonnais and in the semi-final Thun, Basel advanced to the final, and winning this 4–1 against AC Bellinzona they won the competition. Zanni played in all six cup games over 90 minutes.

==== Season 2008–09 ====
To the beginning of the 2008–09 season Zanni was member of the Basel team that won the Uhrencup. They beat Legia Warsaw 6–1 and played a 2–2 draw with Borussia Dortmund to end the table on top slot above Dortmund and Luzern.

Basel joined the 2008–09 UEFA Champions League in the second qualifying round and with an aggregate score of 5–3 they eliminated IFK Göteborg. In the next round they played against Vitória de Guimarães. The first leg ended in a goalless draw, but with a 2–1 win in the second leg they eliminated Vitória and advanced to the group stage. Here Basel were matched with Barcelona, Sporting CP and Shakhtar Donetsk but ended the group in last position winning just one point after a 1–1 draw in Camp Nou. Zanni played in all games except the last against Sporting due to an injury.

In the 2008–09 Super League season Zanni scored one of his rare goals. On the 9 August 2008, in the home game against Vaduz. Carlitos took the corner kick and from the six-yard line Zanni headed the ball, out of the reach of goalkeeper Yann Sommer into the net. It was the first goal of the match as Basel won the game 4–0. He scored another goal, as the season was in its final stages. On 12 May 2009 Basel had a home game and in the 59th minute Zanni received the ball near the middle line, he moved towards the opponents’ goal, not seeing any well positioned teammates, he had a right footed shot at goal from 20 meters out. The ball flew half high into the net, not giving goalkeeper David Zibung a chance. It was the first goal of the game and Basel went on to win 2–0 against Luzern.

At the end of the 2008–09 Super League season Basel were third in the table, seven points behind new champions Zürich and one adrift of runners-up Young Boys. Basel had lost three of their last five games. For the club this was a disappointing season and head coach Christian Gross had to leave. In the 2008–09 Swiss Cup Basel advanced via Schötz, Bulle, Thun and Zurich to the semi-finals. But here they were stopped by YB. After a goalless 90 minutes and extra time, YB decided the penalty shoot-out 3–2 and advanced to the final, only to become runners-up, as Sion became cup winners.

==== Season 2009–10 ====
For their 2009–10 season Basel hired Thorsten Fink as new head coach and Zanni found himself in a completely new situation. After having suffered an injury before the season started, the recovery took two months, but Zanni was not able to reobtain his starting position in the team. Under coach Christian Gross Zanni had played four and a half years in virtually every game, but under Fink, he found himself on the bench. For example, in the 2009–10 UEFA Europa League Zanni did not even play in one of the 12 games. Nevertheless, at the end of the 2009–10 season Zanni won the double with his club. They won the League Championship title with 3 points advantage over second placed Young Boys. However Zanni only had eight league appearances. In the Swiss Cup via SC Cham, FC Le Mont, Zürich, FC Biel-Bienne and in the semi-final SC Kriens, Basel advanced to the final, and winning this 6–0 against Lausanne-Sport they won the competition. Zanni played in five of the six cup games.

==== Season 2010–11 ====
Things did not improve themselves in the new season, Fink placed Zanni more on the bench than on the playing field. In the first half of the season, he had four league appearances in the starting eleven, did not play in the cup and in the 2010–11 UEFA Champions League only one minute on the pitch against CFR Cluj. During the winter Zanni sought for a solution, the club granted him a free transfer and after six years with the club, he moved on to FC Vaduz.

During his period with the club, Zanni played a total of 343 games for Basel scoring a total of 10 goals. 163 of these games were in the Swiss Super League, 27 in the Swiss Cup, 45 in the UEFA competitions (Champions League and UEFA Cup) and 108 were friendly games. He scored five goals in the domestic league and five during the test games.

Despite playing a key part in the Basel first team he surprisingly never played for Switzerland.

=== Vaduz ===
On 7 February Zanni transferred free of charge to FC Vaduz in the Swiss Challenge League signing a two-and-a-half-year contract. However at the end of the 2011–12 season Zanni decided to retire from professional football.

=== Buochs ===
On 14 August 2012 Zanni announced that he would return to his club of origin SC Buochs. He played for the club for only six months and then retired from active football.

== Private life ==
After his time at school, Zanni had started an apprenticeship as office clerk. However, after signing his first professional contract as footballer, he interrupted his apprenticeship. After his football career Zanni returned to original plan and restarted the office studies. He did that at the Luzern vocational academy in adult education. He is now purchaser by an international specialist for high-quality screws and fasteners. Zanni is married and the couple have two sons.

== Honours ==
Grasshopper

- Swiss Super League: 2000–01, 2002–03

Basel

- Swiss Super League: 2004–05, 2007–08, 2009–10, 2010–11
- Swiss Cup: 2006–07, 2007–08, 2009–10
- Uhren Cup: 2006, 2008

Vaduz

- Liechtenstein Football Cup: 2010–11

== Sources ==
- Die ersten 125 Jahre. Publisher: Josef Zindel im Friedrich Reinhardt Verlag, Basel. ISBN 978-3-7245-2305-5
- Verein "Basler Fussballarchiv" Homepage
- Interview Reto Zanni auf rotblau.app
