= Kléber (footballer, born 1980) =

Brazilian footballer

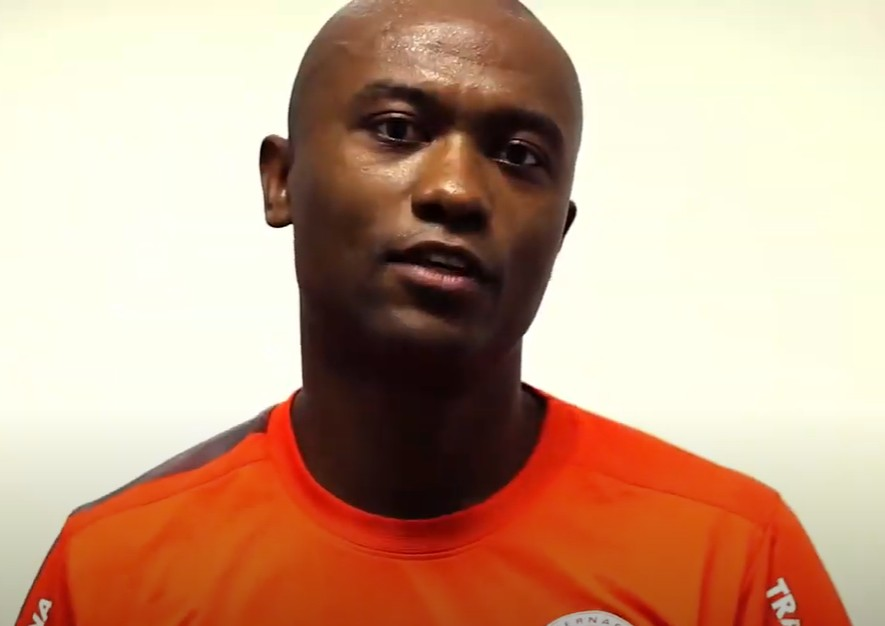
- Kléber in 2013

Personal information
- Full name: Kléber Soriano de Carvalho Corrêa
- Date of birth: 1 April 1980 (age 46)
- Place of birth: São Paulo, Brazil
- Height: 1.77 m (5 ft 10 in)
- Position: Left wing-back

Youth career
- 1997–1998: Corinthians

Senior career*
Years	Team	Apps	(Gls)
1998–2003	Corinthians	260	(8)
2003–2004	→ Hannover 96 (loan)	23	(1)
2004–2005	FC Basel	30	(1)
2005	→ Santos (loan)	15	(0)
2006–2008	Santos	165	(14)
2009–2013	Internacional	122	(6)
2014	Figueirense	4	(0)
Total		619	(30)

International career
2002–2011	Brazil	21	(1)
- * Club domestic league appearances and goals

Kléber Soriano de Carvalho Corrêa (born 1 April 1980), commonly known as Kléber, is a Brazilian former professional footballer, who played as a left wing-back.

== Club career ==
=== Corinthians ===
Kléber began his career in Corinthians. He was a regular team when Corinthians won the Brazilian Championship twice in the 1998 and 1999 campaigns. He won the FIFA Club World Championship in 2000, São Paulo State Championship in 2001 and Brazil Cup in 2002.

=== Hannover (loan) ===
In July 2003, he moved to Hannover 96 on loan for a fee of nearly 1 million Euro, but he failed to establish himself with the German club. At the end of the season they did not pull the buy-out option in the loan contract, and he had to return to his club of origin.

=== Basel ===
Kléber moved to Basel in the summer of 2004 on a three-year contract. He joined Basel's first team for their 2004–05 season under head coach Christian Gross. Kléber became a regular at the Swiss club immediately. After playing in two test games he played his domestic league debut for the club in the home game in the St. Jakob-Park on 17 July 2004 as Basel won 6–0 against Aarau. As reigning Swiss champions, Basel entered 2004–05 UEFA Champions League in the third qualifying round and their aim was to reach the group stage. However, they were drawn against Internazionale and Inter won the qualifier 5–2 on aggregate. Basel subsequently dropped into the 2004–05 UEFA Cup. Beating Terek Grozny in the first round, Basel qualified for the group stage. A 1–1 draw away against Schalke 04 was followed by a home defeat against Hearts. But with two victories, 2–1 away against Ferencvárosi TC and 1–0 at home against Feyenoord, saw Basel rise to third place in the group table and advance to the knock-out stage. In the round of 32 in the 2004–05 UEFA Cup, a home game in the St. Jakob-Park on 17 February 2005, Basel played a goalless draw against Lille OSC, but the return leg were defeated 2–0 and were eliminated.

Kléber scored his first goal for his new club on 16 March 2005 in the home game in the St. Jakob-Park as Basel won 4–3 against Schaffhausen. Basel completed all the 2004–05 Super League season's seventeen home games undefeated, winning thirteen and drawing four. They ended the season as Swiss champions with 10 points advantage over second placed Thun.

Kléber started the next season with the team, playing six of the first seven league games. But then came the players wish to return home to Brazil, the club complied with his request, loaning him out, but he never returned.

During his time with them, Kléber played a total of 72 games for Basel scoring a total of three goals. 36 of these games were in the Swiss Super League, three in the Swiss Cup, 11 in the UEFA competitions (Champions League and Europa League) and 22 were friendly games. He scored one goal in the domestic and the other two were scored during the test games.

=== Santos ===
To the beginning of September 2005, Kléber joined Santos on a one-year loan The loan contract had an option for a definitive transfer. In 2006, Kléber was a part of the team that won São Paulo State Championship. Santos pulled the option and purchased his contract. The team finished fourth in the Brazilian League. Santos won the state title once again in 2007, with Kléber delivering the cross to the winning 2–0 goal against São Caetano.

=== Internacional ===
On 26 January 2009, the left wingback was signed by Internacional. The investment company DIS Esporte bought Kléber from Santos for R$ 5 million and sold to Inter for undisclosed fee. In September 2010 he signed a new contract which last until January 2013.

== International career ==
Kléber made his debut for Brazil on 31 January 2002 in a friendly match against Bolivia. A year later, he was included in Brazil team for 2003 FIFA Confederations Cup. He appeared in all three matches, as Brazil was eliminated in the group stage. After missing out from the national team for more than four years, he was recalled to the team in March 2007 and subsequently earned a place in Brazil's team for 2007 Copa América, which Brazil went on to win. He scored his first international goal on 12 September 2007 in a friendly match against Mexico. In May 2009, he was selected for the Brazil squad for the 2009 FIFA Confederations Cup in South Africa.

== Personal life ==
Kléber is the father of the Brazilian footballer Kaique Kenji.

== Career statistics ==
Appearances and goals by national team and year
National team	Year	Apps	Goals
Brazil	2002	3	0
Brazil	2003	4	0
Brazil	2007	4	1
Brazil	2008	4	0
Brazil	2009	4	0
Brazil	2011	2	0
Total		21	1

== Honours ==
=== Club ===
Corinthians

- Campeonato Brasileiro Série A: 1998, 1999
- Copa do Brasil: 2002
- Torneio Rio-São Paulo: 2002
- Campeonato Paulista: 1999, 2001, 2003
- FIFA Club World Championship: 2000

Basel

- Swiss Super League: 2004–05

Santos

- Campeonato Paulista: 2006, 2007

Internacional

- Campeonato Gaúcho: 2009, 2011, 2012
- Suruga Bank Championship: 2009
- Copa Libertadores: 2010
- Recopa Sudamericana: 2011

=== International ===
Brazil

- Copa América: 2007
- Confederations Cup: 2009
- Superclásico de las Américas: 2011

=== Individual ===
- Bola de Prata: 2006, 2007, 2009
- Campeonato Brasileiro Série A Team of the Year: 2007

== Sources ==
- Die ersten 125 Jahre. Publisher: Josef Zindel im Friedrich Reinhardt Verlag, Basel. ISBN 978-3-7245-2305-5
- Verein "Basler Fussballarchiv" Homepage
