= César Carignano =

Argentine footballer (born 1982)

Personal information
- Full name: César Andrés Carignano
- Date of birth: 28 September 1982 (age 44)
- Place of birth: Freyre, Córdoba, Argentina
- Height: 1.89 m (6 ft 2 1/2 in)
- Position: Forward

Youth career
- –1996: 9 de Julio de Freyre
- 1996–2000: Club Atlético Colón

Senior career*
| Years | Team | Apps | (Gls) |
| 2000–2004 | Colón | 79 | (27) |
| 2004–2008 | Basel | 19 | (7) |
| 2007 | → América (loan) | 0 | (0) |
| 2008 | Colón | 0 | (0) |
| 2008–2009 | Independiente Rivadavia | 18 | (2) |
| 2009–2010 | Ferro Carril Oeste | 33 | (6) |
| 2010–2011 | Atlético Rafaela | 37 | (21) |
| 2011 | Universidad Católica | 13 | (6) |
| 2012 | Atlético Rafaela | 36 | (8) |
| 2013–2014 | Patronato | 55 | (13) |
| 2014–2015 | Sportivo Belgrano | 33 | (3) |
| 2016 | Sarmiento de Humboldt | 0 | (0) |

International career
| 2003 | Argentina | 3 | (0) |
- * Club domestic league appearances and goals as of 23:11, 3 September 2019 (UTC)

César Andrés Carignano (born 28 September 1982) is an Argentine retired footballer who played as a forward.

== Career ==
=== Club ===
Carignano started his children's football in the local club in the town of Freyre in the San Justo Department, Córdoba in his homeland Argentina. In 1996 he moved to the youth department of Colón de Santa Fe and advanced to their first team turning professional four years later. He spent 4 years with Colón, scoring 27 goals in 79 games.

On 20 May 2004 it was announced that Carignano had signed for the reigning Swiss champions FC Basel on a four-year contract. It was reported that the transfer had cost the club 4.7m Euro, which made him the most expensive transfer for all Swiss Super League clubs ever. He joined Basel's first team during their 2004–05 season under head coach Christian Gross. After playing in nine test games, Carignano played his domestic league debut for the club in the away game in the Stade de Genève on 30 July 2004 as Basel won 2–1 against Servette.

As reigning Swiss champions, Basel entered 2004–05 UEFA Champions League in the third qualifying round and their aim was to reach the group stage. However, they were drawn against Internazionale and Inter won the qualifier 5–2 on aggregate. Carignano was used as substitute in both legs. Basel subsequently dropped into the 2004–05 UEFA Cup. Beating Terek Grozny in the first round, Basel qualified for the group stage. A 1–1 draw away against Schalke 04 was followed by a home defeat against Hearts. Carignano was used as substitute in three of these four games and he scored his first European goal against Hearts. But with two victories, 2–1 away against Ferencvárosi TC and 1–0 at home against Feyenoord, saw Basel rise to third place in the group table and advance to the knock-out stage. The home win against Feyenoord, on 16 December, in which Carignano scored the winning goal, saw him become good critics and he was declared as man of the match. In the round of 32 in the 2004–05 UEFA Cup, a home game in the St. Jakob-Park on 17 February 2005, Basel played a goalless draw against Lille OSC, but the return leg were defeated 2–0 and were eliminated.

At the beginning of the season Carignano was used mainly as substitute, but following his goal against Hearts, he was playing mainly in the starting eleven. In the match against Aarau on 2 April 2005, however, he injured himself and missed the rest of the season. Nevertheless, Basel completed all the 2004–05 Super League season's seventeen home games undefeated, winning thirteen and drawing four. They ended the season as Swiss champions with 10 points advantage over second placed Thun.

The injuries Carignano had, groin problems and tendonitis, took a long time to heel. It was not until the end of the following season, after a few games with their U-21 team, that he was able to play in the first team again. But he had only three short appearances and the problems re-occurred. He missed the beginning of their 2005–06 season as well. In February 2007, during the last stages of recuperation, it was decided to loan him out to Club América for the 2007 Copa Libertadores. He did not play any games during his time at América and on 7 June 2007 it was reported that he had to returned Basel after only four months.

On 8 January 2008, it was announced that Basel and Carignano had mutually terminated their contract, which was originally dated up until 30 June 2008, due to the re-occurring injuries. During his time with them, Carignano played a total of 51 games for Basel scoring a total of 29 goals. 19 of these games were in the Swiss Super League, two in the Swiss Cup, nine in the UEFA competitions (Champions League and UEFA Cup) and 21 were friendly games. He scored seven goals in the domestic league, two in the UEFA Cup and the other 20 were scored during the test games.

Carignano then returned to Colón de Santa Fe. In his second spell with Colón he struggled, making most of his appearances coming off the bench. After a few months he transferred to second division club Independiente Rivadavia. Subsequently, he played for Ferro and Atlético Rafaela in the second division. In January 2013, Cesar signed contract for playing in Patronato de Paraná.

=== National team ===
Carignano played 3 caps for Argentina. He earned these caps from 2003 to 2004, while he was still at Colón.

=== National team statistics ===
Argentina national team
| Year | Apps | Goals |
|---|---|---|
| 2003 | 3 | 0 |
| Total | 3 | 0 |

== Honours ==
Basel

- Swiss Super League: 2004–05

Universidad Católica

- Copa Chile: 2011

Atlético de Rafaela

- Copa Ciudad de Rosario: 2012

== Sources ==
- Die ersten 125 Jahre. Publisher: Josef Zindel im Friedrich Reinhardt Verlag, Basel. ISBN 978-3-7245-2305-5
- Verein "Basler Fussballarchiv" Homepage
