= Daniel Sereinig =

Swiss footballer (born 1982)

Personal information
- Date of birth: 10 May 1982 (age 44)
- Place of birth: Wil, Switzerland
- Height: 1.86 m (6 ft 1 in)
- Position: Defender

Team information
- Current team: FC Vaduz II (Manager)

Youth career
- –2001: FC Rorschach

Senior career*
Years	Team	Apps	(Gls)
2001	St. Gallen	2	(0)
2002	FC Wil	4	(0)
2002–2007	FC Schaffhausen	99	(5)
2007–2008	Rot-Weiss Essen	34	(3)
2008–2008	SCR Altach	4	(0)
2009–2011	SC Freiburg II	54	(3)
2010–2011	SC Freiburg	1	(0)
2011–2014	FC Winterthur	75	(8)
2014–2016	FC Schwarzach		

Managerial career
- 2014–2016: FC Schwarzach (player-manager)
- 2016–2017: FC Vaduz II
- 2017: FC Vaduz (assistant)
- 2018–2019: FC Vaduz (assistant)
- 2019–: FC Vaduz II
- * Club domestic league appearances and goals

Daniel Sereinig (born 10 May 1982) is a Swiss former professional footballer who played as defender.

== Career ==
Sereinig was born in Wil, Switzerland. He joined SC Freiburg in January 2009 from SCR Altach. He was generally a member of the team's reserve squad, however, made his professional debut in the Bundesliga on 2 October 2010 as a late substitute against 1. FC Köln.

On 28 January 2011, he signed a contract with FC Winterthur until summer 2012 with the option to extend it by one season.
