= Enzo Todisco =

Swiss-born Italian footballer (born 1980)

Personal information
- Full name: Enzo Todisco
- Date of birth: 22 April 1980 (age 46)
- Place of birth: St. Gallen, Switzerland
- Height: 1.82 m (5 ft 11 1/2 in)
- Position: Forward

Team information
- Current team: FC Gossau
- Number: 3

Senior career*
Years	Team	Apps	(Gls)
1999–2000	FC St Gallen	2	(0)
2000–2001	St. Gallen U-21	23	(12)
2001–2002	FC Vaduz	16	(0)
2002–2009	FC Schaffhausen	143	(21)
2004	→ FC St Gallen (loan)	10	(5)
2009–	FC Gossau		
- * Club domestic league appearances and goals as of 25 July 2009

Enzo Todisco (born 22 April 1980) is a former footballer who last plays as forward for FC Gossau in the 1. Liga Classic. He used to play for FC St. Gallen and FC Schaffhausen in the Super League, which is the highest Swiss Professional League.
