= Leonel Romero =

Peruvian-Swiss footballer (born 1987)

Personal information
- Full name: Leonel Romero
- Date of birth: 28 January 1987 (age 39)
- Place of birth: Peru
- Height: 1.73 m (5 ft 8 in)
- Position: Defender

Team information
- Current team: SC YF Juventus

Youth career
- 1994–1995: FC Turicum ZH
- 1995–1998: SC YF Juventus
- 1998–2005: Grasshopper

Senior career*
Years	Team	Apps	(Gls)
2005–2009	Grasshopper	3	(0)
2007–2009	→ FC Wohlen (loan)	41	(8)
2009–2012	FC Wohlen	74	(7)
2012–	SC YF Juventus		

International career^{‡}
2009	Swiss Under-20	3	(0)
- * Club domestic league appearances and goals as of 9 June 2012 ‡ National team caps and goals as of 9 June 2008

Leonel Romero (born 28 January 1987) is a Peruvian–Swiss football defender, currently playing for Swiss club Young Fellows Juventus.

== Career ==
He spent the entire 2007–08 season on loan at FC Wohlen. He signed new contract in 2009.
