= Thomas Mandl =

Austrian footballer

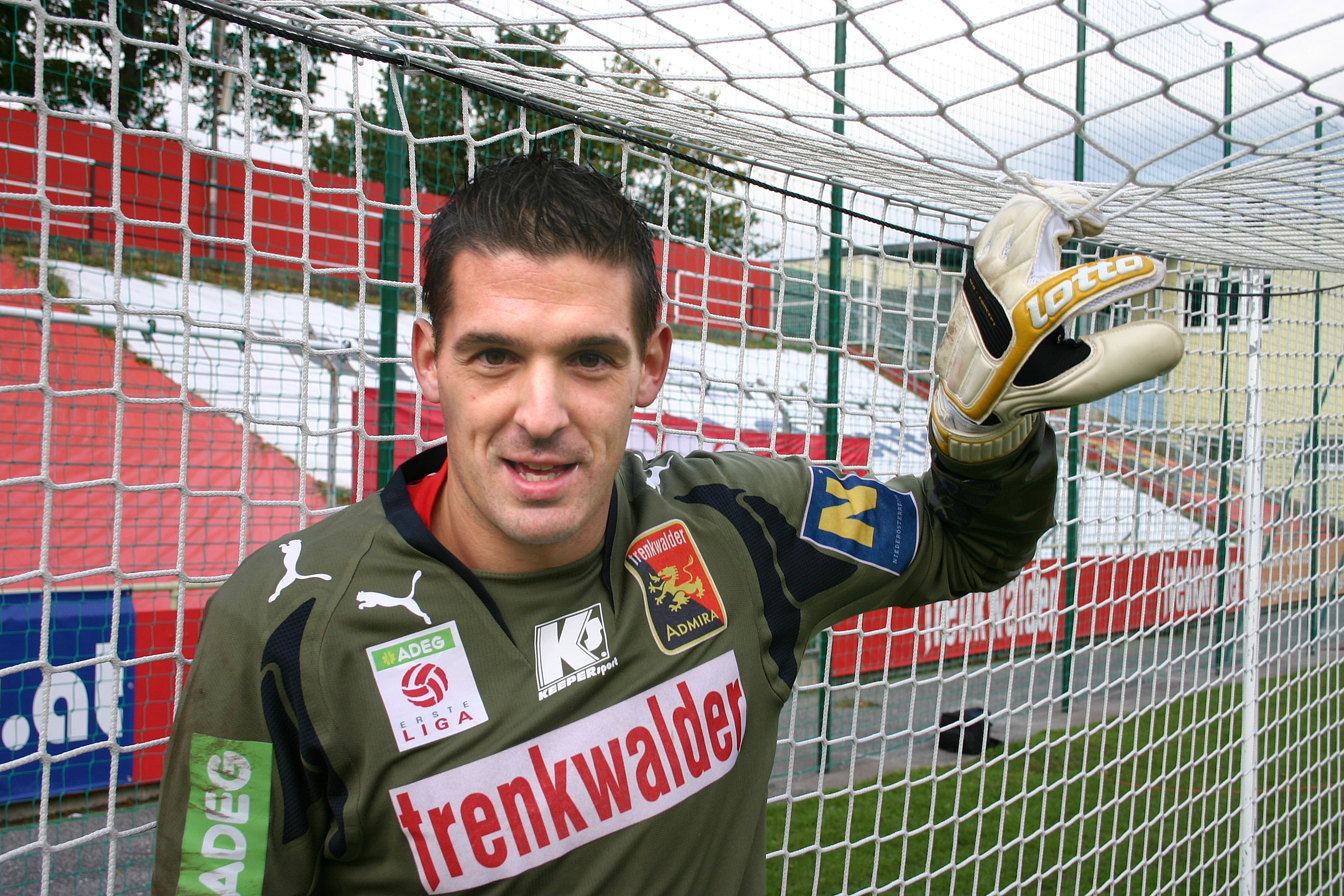

Personal information
- Date of birth: 7 February 1979 (age 47)
- Place of birth: Eisenstadt, Austria
- Height: 1.85 m (6 ft 1 in)
- Position: Goalkeeper

Team information
- Current team: First Vienna
- Number: 1

Youth career
- 1986–1992: ASK Hirm
- 1992: SV Mattersburg
- 1992–1998: ASK Hirm

Senior career*
Years	Team	Apps	(Gls)
1998–2004	Austria Vienna	65	(0)
2004	→ Sturm Graz (loan)	16	(0)
2004–2005	FC Basel	1	(0)
2005–2006	→ Admira Wacker (loan)	35	(0)
2006–2007	FC Nuorese	1	(0)
2007–2008	Schwadorf	33	(0)
2008–2010	Trenkwalder Admira	57	(0)
2010–2012	LASK Linz	70	(0)
2012–	First Vienna		

International career^{‡}
2002–2004	Austria	13	(0)
- * Club domestic league appearances and goals as of 8 August 2008 ‡ National team caps and goals as of 8 August 2008

Thomas Mandl (born 7 February 1979 in Eisenstadt) is an Austrian football goalkeeper, who currently plays for First Vienna in the Austrian Football First League.

== Club career ==
He started his career at Austrian giants FK Austria Wien in 1997 where he broke into the first team in 2001. His good displays earned him a call up to the Austria national team. He moved to Swiss League club FC Basel in 2004 but he failed to force his way into the team and was second choice behind Pascal Zuberbühler. In June 2005 he moved back on loan to Austria with VfB Admira Wacker Mödling and in autumn 2006 he had an unsuccessful trial at Vitesse Arnhem in the Dutch Eredivisie. In 2007, he signed for SK Schwadorf after a short spell in the Italian Serie C2 with Nuorese, in July 2008 moved to Trenkwalder Admira.

== International career ==
He made his debut for Austria in a November 2002 friendly match against Norway and competed for the national jersey with Alex Manninger for 2 years. He earned 13 caps, no goals scored. His last international was an August 2004 friendly match against Germany.

== National team statistics ==
Austria national team
Year	Apps	Goals
2002	1	0
2003	8	0
2004	4	0
Total	13	0

== Honours ==
- Austrian Football Bundesliga (1):
  - 2003
- Austrian Cup (1):
  - 2003
- Swiss Super League (1):
  - 2005
