= Raúl Cabanas =

Swiss footballer (born 1986)

Personal information
- Full name: Raúl Cabanas Barreiro
- Date of birth: 31 March 1986 (age 40)
- Place of birth: Zurich, Switzerland
- Height: 1.70 m (5 ft 7 in)
- Position: Midfielder

Youth career
- 1997–2005: Grasshopper-Club Zurich

Senior career*
Years	Team	Apps	(Gls)
2005–2007	Grasshopper-Club Zurich	14	(0)
2006–2007	Grasshopper B	25	(8)
2008–2010	FC Wohlen	53	(8)
2010–2011	FC Winterthur		
2011–?	YF Juventus		
- * Club domestic league appearances and goals

Raúl Cabanas (born 31 March 1986) is a Swiss former footballer who plays as midfielder. He is the cousin of 2006 FIFA World Cup, UEFA Euro 2004 and UEFA Euro 2008 participant Ricardo Cabanas.

Cabanas signed a youth contract with Grasshopper-Club Zurich on 20 July 1997.
