= Ricardo Cabanas =

Swiss footballer (born 1979)

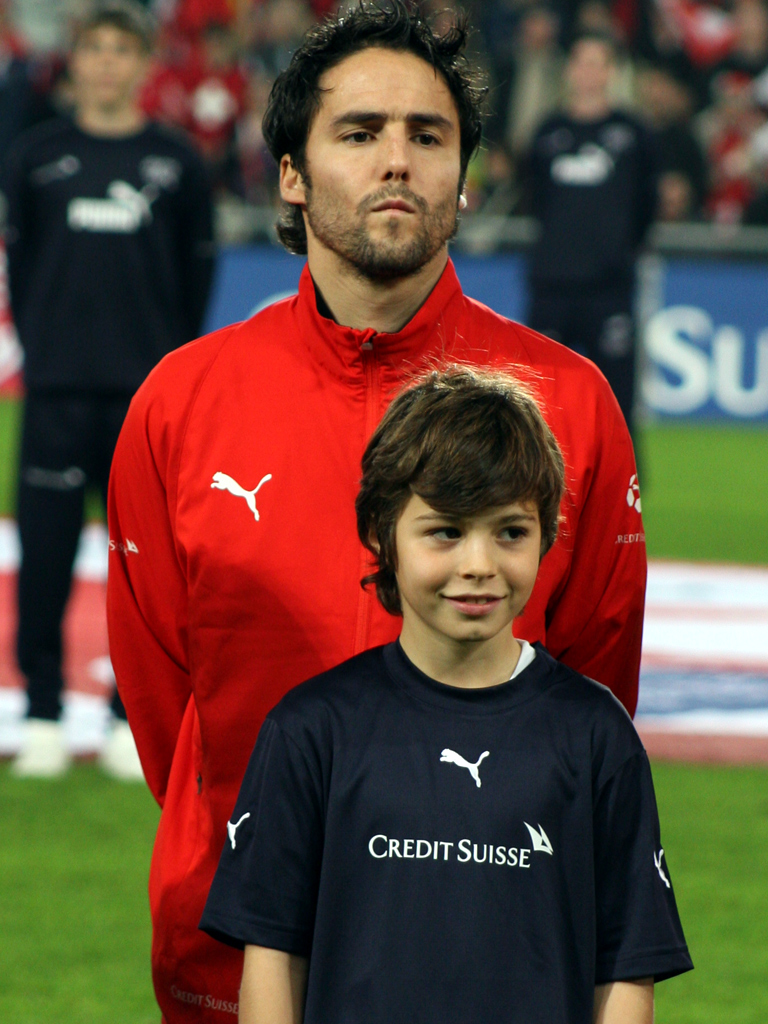
- Cabanas lining up for Switzerland in 2006

Personal information
- Full name: Ricardo Cabanas-Rey
- Date of birth: 17 January 1979 (age 47)
- Place of birth: Zürich, Switzerland
- Height: 1.73 m (5 ft 8 in)
- Position: Midfielder

Youth career
- 1986–1992: SCI Juventus Zürich
- 1992–1997: Grasshoppers

Senior career*
Years	Team	Apps	(Gls)
1997–2006	Grasshoppers	198	(42)
2003–2004	→ Guingamp (loan)	17	(0)
2006–2007	1. FC Köln	41	(2)
2007–2012	Grasshoppers	86	(20)
Total		342	(64)

International career
2000–2008	Switzerland	51	(4)
2005–2008	Galicia	2	(0)
- * Club domestic league appearances and goals

Ricardo Cabanas-Rey (born 17 January 1979) is a Swiss former professional footballer who played as a midfielder. He played 51 international matches for the Switzerland national team. At club level, he played mainly for Grasshoppers Zürich but also played abroad, in France with Guingamp and in Germany with 1. FC Köln.

== Club career ==
Born in Zürich, Cabanas started his career with Grasshoppers Zürich and played there for several seasons, winning two league titles, before moving to 1. FC Köln. During this period, he also enjoyed a loan spell at En Avant de Guingamp.

In June 2007, 1. FC Köln announced that Cabanas was to return to his previous club Grasshoppers for an undisclosed fee.

== International career ==
Cabanas is a member of the Switzerland national team and was called up to the squad which participated in the 2006 World Cup and the Euro 2008. At the 2006 FIFA World Cup he missed a spot-kick during his side's penalty shootout against Ukraine, who emerged victorious. Cabanas has also played for the (non-official) Galicia national team against Iran and against Uruguay.

== Personal life ==
His father, also called Ricardo Cabanas, played for Bellinzona, and for SC Kriens in the 1980–81 season. His brother, Christian Cabanas Rey, also briefly played in the professional league. His cousin, Raúl Cabanas, played with Ricardo at Grasshoppers.

He has two children with his wife Deby.
