= Andres Gerber =

Swiss footballer and manager (born 1973)

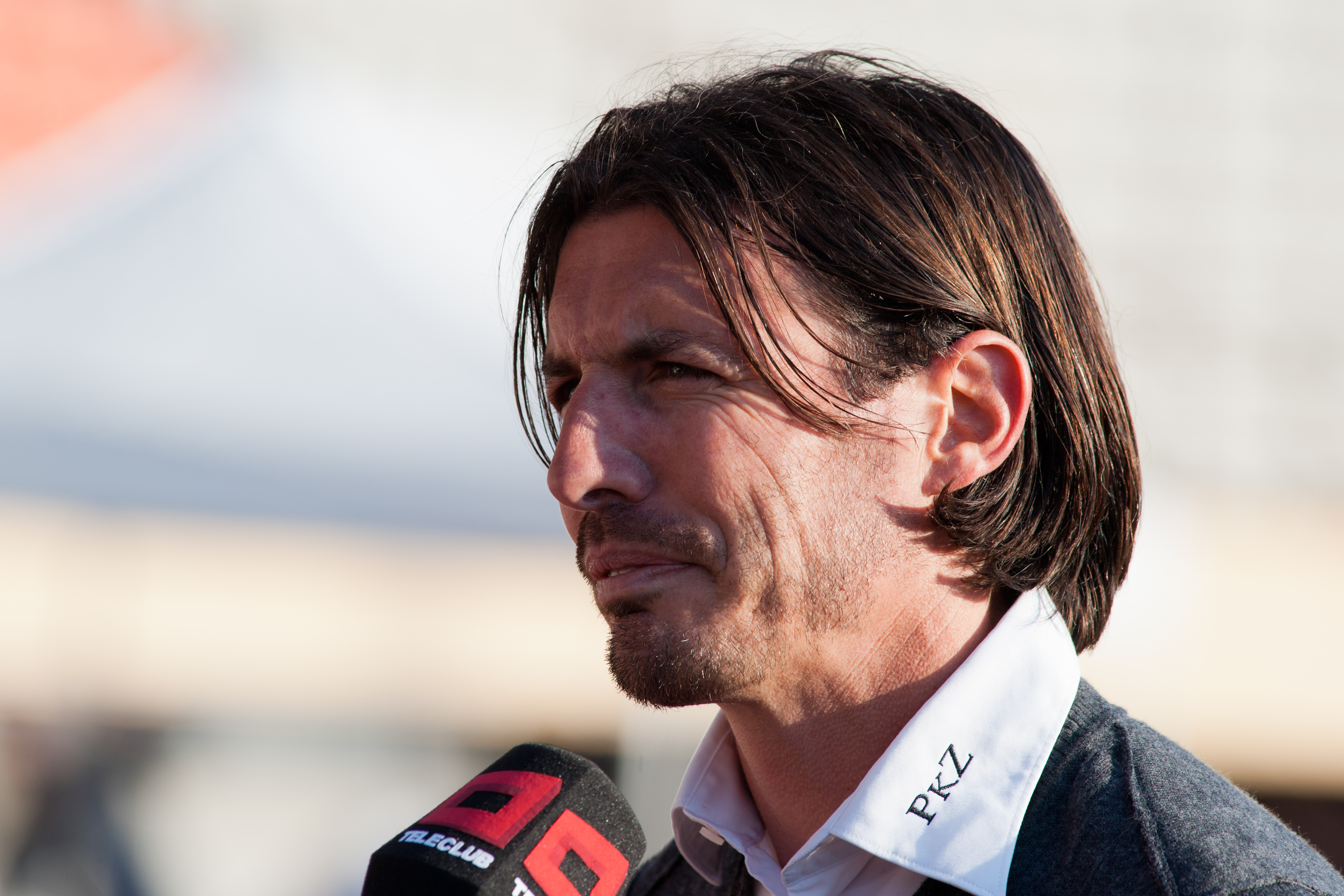

Personal information
- Date of birth: 26 April 1973 (age 53)
- Place of birth: Belp, Switzerland
- Height: 1.76 m (5 ft 9 1/2 in)
- Position: Defender

Youth career
- –1992: FC Belp

Senior career*
Years	Team	Apps	(Gls)
1992–1998	BSC Young Boys	132	(11)
1998–2000	Lausanne	60	(11)
2000–2003	Grasshoppers	87	(2)
2003–2009	Thun	138	(15)

International career
2000–2009	Switzerland	4	(0)

Managerial career
- 2009–2010: Thun (assistant)
- * Club domestic league appearances and goals

Andres Gerber (born 26 April 1973) is a Swiss former footballer who's currently the chairman of Swiss Challenge League football club Thun.

He was capped four times for Switzerland as a midfielder and played for Thun.

== Honours ==
Grasshoppers

- Swiss Championship: 2000–01, 2002–03

Lausanne

- Swiss Cup: 1998–99
