= Demba Touré =

Senegalese footballer

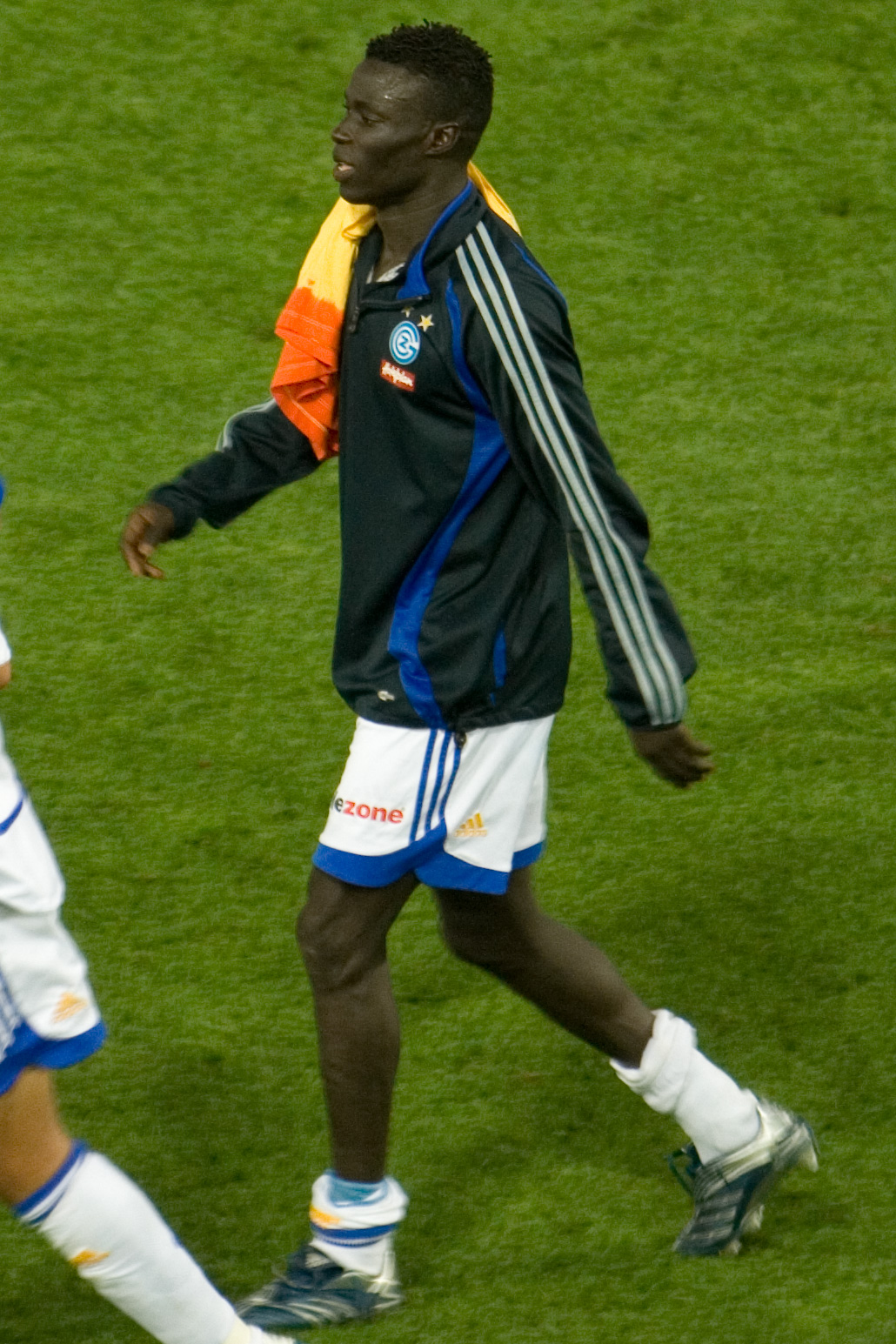
- Touré with Grasshoppers in 2007

Personal information
- Full name: Pape Demba Armand Tourézé
- Date of birth: 31 December 1984 (age 41)
- Place of birth: Dakar, Senegal
- Height: 1.82 m (6 ft 0 in)
- Position: Striker

Senior career*
Years	Team	Apps	(Gls)
2002–2004	Lyon	2	(0)
2004–2009	Grasshoppers	95	(14)
2007–2008	→ Dynamo Kyiv (loan)	4	(0)
2009–2011	Reims	26	(0)
2011–2012	Astra Ploieşti	1	(0)
2011–2012	→ Astra II Giurgiu	1	(0)
2012	Al-Oruba	13	(4)
2013	Valletta	14	(6)
2013–2014	Birkirkara	9	(1)
2014	→ Tarxien Rainbows (loan)	12	(9)
2015–2016	Naxxar Lions	28	(8)
2017	Għajnsielem	1	(1)
2017	→ Żebbuġ Rangers (loan)		

International career
2007	Senegal	5	(3)
- * Club domestic league appearances and goals

Pape Demba Armand Tourézé (born 31 December 1984) is a Senegalese former professional footballer who played as a striker. He dropped the 'zé' part of his surname when he was 20, re-registering his name with FIFA as Demba Armand Touré.

== Club career ==
Touré was born in Dakar, Senegal. He played at Lyon for the 2002–03 and 2003–04 seasons, and was then loaned to Grasshoppers for 2004–05 and 2005–ß6.

Touré signed a 3 1/2-year contract with Astra Ploiești in November 2011. He left Astra Ploiești in December 2011 due to financial dispute with the club. Touré signed with Al-Oruba Dubai in January 2012 for only six months.

On 27 December 2012, Toure signed with Maltese club Valletta On 4 July 2013, he signed a two-year contract with league rivals Birkirkara.

== International career ==
Touré was called up to the Senegal national team for the 2008 African Cup of Nations qualifying game against Burkina Faso in October 2006 to replace the injured Marseille striker Mamadou Niang. In 2007 he earned five caps scoring three goals.
