= 2002–03 in Swiss football =

Football in Switzerland
- Season: 2002–03

Men's football
- Nationalliga A: Grasshopper Club
- Nationalliga B: Vaduz
- 1. Liga: Group 1: Meyrin; Group 2: Young Fellows Juventus; Group 3: Malcantone
- Swiss Cup: Basel

Women's football
- Swiss Women's Super League: FC Sursee
- Swiss Cup: FC Schwerzenbach

The following is a summary of the 2002–03 season of competitive football in Switzerland.

== Nationalliga A ==
=== Qualification phase ===
Pos	Team	Pld	W	D	L	GF	GA	GD	BP	Pts	Qualification
1	Grasshopper Club	22	15	4	3	58	26	+32	0	49	Advance to championship round halved points (rounded up) as bonus
2	Basel	22	14	5	3	57	25	+32	0	47	Advance to championship round halved points (rounded up) as bonus
3	Thun	22	9	4	9	33	33	0	0	31	Advance to championship round halved points (rounded up) as bonus
4	Wil	22	8	7	7	43	45	−2	0	31	Advance to championship round halved points (rounded up) as bonus
5	Zürich	22	9	4	9	35	37	−2	0	31	Advance to championship round halved points (rounded up) as bonus
6	Xamax	22	8	7	7	30	33	−3	0	31	Advance to championship round halved points (rounded up) as bonus
7	Young Boys	22	8	6	8	41	41	0	0	30	Advance to championship round halved points (rounded up) as bonus
8	Servette	22	8	5	9	45	37	+8	0	29	Advance to championship round halved points (rounded up) as bonus
9	Luzern	22	7	5	10	31	38	−7	−2	24	Continue to promotion/relegation round
10	St. Gallen	22	6	6	10	31	48	−17	0	24	Continue to promotion/relegation round
11	SR Delémont	22	6	2	14	24	44	−20	0	20	Continue to promotion/relegation round
12	Aarau	22	5	3	14	19	40	−21	0	18	Continue to promotion/relegation round

Source: RSSSF
Rules for classification: 1) points; 2) goal difference; 3) number of goals scored.
FC Luzern 2 points deducted for irregularities in license application, therefore total points: 24

=== Championship round ===
The first eight teams of the regular season (or Qualification) competed in the Championship Playoff Round. They took half of the points (rounded up to complete units) gained in the Qualification as Bonus with them.

Pos	Team	Pld	W	D	L	GF	GA	GD	BP	Pts	Qualification
1	Grasshopper Club	14	9	5	0	37	15	+22	25	57	Champions; Qualification to Champions League third qualifying round
2	Basel	14	10	2	2	38	17	+21	24	56	Swiss Cup winners Qualification to UEFA Cup first round
3	Neuchâtel Xamax	14	5	4	5	18	17	+1	16	35	Qualification to UEFA Cup qualifying round
4	Young Boys	14	6	1	7	21	29	−8	15	34	Qualification to UEFA Cup qualifying round
5	Zürich	14	4	3	7	20	23	−3	16	31	
6	Servette	14	4	4	6	16	26	−10	15	31	
7	Thun	14	3	3	8	18	30	−12	16	28	Qualification to Intertoto Cup second round
8	Wil	14	2	4	8	19	30	−11	16	26	Qualification to Intertoto Cup first round

Source: RSSSF
Rules for classification: 1) points; 2) Position in the qualification

== Nationalliga B ==
=== Qualification phase ===
Pos	Team	Pld	W	D	L	GF	GA	GD	BP	Pts	Qualification
1	FC Vaduz	22	12	5	5	47	32	+15	0	41	Advance to promotion/relegation group NLA/NLB
2	FC Sion	22	12	3	7	35	27	+8	0	39	Advance to promotion/relegation group NLA/NLB
3	SC Kriens	22	11	5	6	48	36	+12	0	38	Advance to promotion/relegation group NLA/NLB
4	FC Lugano	22	12	6	4	36	17	+19	−5	37	Advance to promotion/relegation group NLA/NLB
5	Yverdon-Sport FC	22	10	6	6	36	21	+15	0	36	Continue to relegation round NLB/1. Liga halved points (rounded up) as bonus
6	FC Schaffhausen	22	8	8	6	30	35	−5	0	32	Continue to relegation round NLB/1. Liga halved points (rounded up) as bonus
7	Lausanne-Sport	22	9	3	10	27	32	−5	0	30	Continue to relegation round NLB/1. Liga halved points (rounded up) as bonus
8	FC Concordia Basel	22	7	6	9	29	43	−14	0	27	Continue to relegation round NLB/1. Liga halved points (rounded up) as bonus
9	AC Bellinzona	22	7	4	11	32	34	−2	0	25	Continue to relegation round NLB/1. Liga halved points (rounded up) as bonus
10	FC Baden	22	4	6	12	26	38	−12	0	18	Continue to relegation round NLB/1. Liga halved points (rounded up) as bonus
11	FC Wohlen	22	4	4	14	23	42	−19	0	16	Continue to relegation round NLB/1. Liga halved points (rounded up) as bonus
12	FC Winterthur	22	4	8	10	24	36	−12	−8	12	Continue to relegation round NLB/1. Liga halved points (rounded up) as bonus

Source: RSSSF
Rules for classification: 1) points; 2) goal difference; 3) number of goals scored.
FC Lugano: 5 points deducted for irregularities in license application.
FC Winterthur: 8 points deducted for irregularities in license application.

=== Promotion/relegation group NLA/NLB ===
Pos	Team	Pld	W	D	L	GF	GA	GD	Pts	Qualification
1	Aarau (O)	12	9	1	2	30	13	+17	28	Qualification to Super League
2	St. Gallen (O)	12	7	3	2	25	9	+16	24	Qualification to Super League
3	Luzern (R)	12	4	4	4	24	22	+2	16	Qualification to Challenge League
4	Vaduz	12	3	4	5	17	23	−6	13	Qualification to Challenge League
5	Sion	12	3	3	6	14	18	−4	12	Licence refused
6	Delémont (R)	12	3	3	6	13	24	−11	12	Qualification to Challenge League
7	Kriens	12	3	2	7	14	28	−14	11	Qualification to Challenge League
8	Lugano	0	0	0	0	0	0	0	0	Relegated to 2. Liga

Source: RSSSF
Notes: FC Aarau and FC St. Gallen remained in Super League; no team promoted.
FC Luzern and SR Delémont relegated from Super League to Challenge League.
FC Lugano withdrew, were declared bankrupt and relegated to amateur status.
FC Sion were refused the Licence on the green table and were relegated to amateur status.
Rules for classification: 1) points; 2) goal difference; 3) number of goals scored.
(O) Play-off winners; (R) Relegated

=== Relegation group NLB/1. Liga ===
Pos	Team	Pld	W	D	L	GF	GA	GD	BP	Pts	Qualification
1	FC Schaffhausen	14	7	3	4	21	26	−5	16	40	Qualification to Challenge League
2	FC Concordia Basel	14	8	2	4	31	13	+18	14	40	Qualification to Challenge League
3	FC Baden	14	10	1	3	30	18	+12	9	40	Qualification to Challenge League
4	Yverdon-Sport FC	14	4	4	6	17	18	−1	18	34	Qualification to Challenge League
5	FC Wohlen	14	6	2	6	20	22	−2	8	28	Qualification to Challenge League
6	FC Lausanne-Sport	14	2	5	7	20	33	−13	15	26	Relegated to 2. Liga
7	AC Bellinzona	14	2	5	7	17	22	−5	13	24	Qualification to Challenge League
8	FC Winterthur	14	4	4	6	21	25	−4	6	22	Qualification to Challenge League

Source: RSSSF
Rules for classification: 1) points; 2) Position in the qualification;
FC Lausanne-Sport were declared bankrupt and relegated to amateur status
No team relegated to 1. Liga.

== 1. Liga ==
There were 48 teams in this division this season, including seven U-21 teams, which were the eldest youth teams of the professional clubs in the Super League and the Challenge League. The 1. Liga was divided into three regional groups, each with 16 teams.

=== Group 1 ===
Pos	Team	Pld	W	D	L	GF	GA	GD	Pts	Qualification or relegation
1	FC Meyrin	30	22	5	3	79	25	+54	71	Play-off to Challenge League
2	FC Bulle	30	17	4	9	58	46	+12	55	Play-off to Challenge League
3	Servette U-21	30	16	4	10	52	34	+18	52	
4	Étoile Carouge FC	30	14	7	9	57	41	+16	49	
5	FC Echallens	30	14	7	9	57	42	+15	49	
6	ES FC Malley	30	14	3	13	58	52	+6	45	
7	FC Martigny-Sports	30	12	5	13	53	54	−1	41	
8	FC Bex	30	11	7	12	62	46	+16	40	
9	FC Naters	30	11	7	12	45	52	−7	40	
10	FC Fribourg	30	10	9	11	51	55	−4	39	
11	FC Stade Lausanne Ouchy	30	10	6	14	38	48	−10	36	
12	FC Baulmes	30	9	8	13	37	50	−13	35	
13	CS Chênois	30	9	6	15	38	52	−14	33	
14	Grand-Lancy FC	30	9	6	15	38	64	−26	33	
15	Vevey Sports	30	8	5	17	40	68	−28	29	
16	FC Stade Nyonnais	30	7	5	18	31	65	−34	26	Play-out against relegation

Source: Erste Liga official website
Rules for classification: 1) Points; 2) Goal difference within the league or play-off for qualifiers.

=== Group 2 ===
Pos	Team	Pld	W	D	L	GF	GA	GD	Pts	Qualification or relegation
1	SC Young Fellows Juventus	30	18	7	5	58	33	+25	61	Play-off to Challenge League
2	FC Wangen bei Olten	30	16	8	6	61	33	+28	56	Play-off to Challenge League
3	FC La Chaux-de-Fonds	30	15	11	4	46	27	+19	56	Play-off to Challenge League
4	FC Solothurn	30	15	6	9	51	31	+20	51	
5	Basel U-21	30	12	12	6	66	44	+22	48	
6	FC Biel-Bienne	30	12	12	6	50	34	+16	48	
7	SV Schaffhausen	30	12	6	12	39	36	+3	42	
8	Grasshopper Club U-21	30	12	6	12	55	55	0	42	
9	Zürich U-21	30	10	10	10	54	40	+14	40	
10	FC Colombier	30	9	12	9	43	43	0	39	
11	FC Serrières	30	9	11	10	35	38	−3	38	
12	FC Grenchen	30	9	9	12	65	59	+6	36	
13	FC Altstetten	30	7	14	9	37	50	−13	35	
14	FC Münsingen	30	5	9	16	33	55	−22	24	
15	SC Zofingen	30	3	8	19	31	83	−52	17	
16	Aarau U-21	30	4	3	23	23	86	−63	15	Withdrew from play-out, relegated

Source: Erste Liga official website
Rules for classification: 1) Points; 2) Goal difference within the league or play-off for qualifiers.

=== Group 3 ===
Pos	Team	Pld	W	D	L	GF	GA	GD	Pts	Qualification or relegation
1	FC Malcantone Agno	30	16	13	1	53	25	+28	61	Play-off to Challenge League
2	FC Chiasso	30	17	8	5	56	31	+25	59	Play-off to Challenge League
3	FC Tuggen	30	17	7	6	58	35	+23	58	Play-off to Challenge League
4	FC Mendrisio	30	13	9	8	48	36	+12	48	
5	FC Locarno	30	11	12	7	47	33	+14	45	
6	FC Chur 97	30	11	12	7	49	43	+6	45	
7	GC Biaschesi	30	12	9	9	40	36	+4	45	
8	SC Buochs	30	12	8	10	53	40	+13	44	
9	St. Gallen U-21	30	12	6	12	45	48	−3	42	
10	FC Kreuzlingen	30	11	4	15	44	52	−8	37	
11	Zug 94	30	9	6	15	29	38	−9	33	
12	FC Gossau	30	8	7	15	28	53	−25	31	
13	Luzern U-21	30	8	6	16	44	53	−9	30	
14	FC Schötz	30	7	8	15	38	50	−12	29	
15	FC Frauenfeld	30	5	10	15	34	64	−30	25	
16	FC Rapperswil-Jona	30	5	7	18	31	60	−29	22	Play-out against relegation

Source: Erste Liga official website
Rules for classification: 1) Points; 2) Goal difference within the league or play-off for qualifiers.

=== Promotion play-off ===
The three group winners and the three runners-up, together with the two best third placed teams, then contested a play-off for the four promotion slots.

Team 1	Score	Team 2
Tuggen	2–2	Meyrin
Meyrin	2–0	Tuggen

Meyrin win 4–2 on aggregate and are promoted to 2003–04 Challenge League.

Team 1	Score	Team 2
La Chaux-de-Fonds	1–0	Malcantone
Malcantone	3–1	La Chaux-de-Fonds

Malcantone win 3–2 on aggregate and are promoted to 2003–04 Challenge League.

Team 1	Score	Team 2
Chiasso	1–1	Wangen b.O.
Wangen b.O.	3–1	Chiasso

Chiasso win 4–2 on aggregate and were promoted to 2003–04 Challenge League.

Team 1	Score	Team 2
Bulle	1–1	YFJ
YFJ	1–3	Bulle

Bulle win 4–1 on aggregate and were promoted to 2003–04 Challenge League.

La Chaux-de-Fonds were later also promoted later on the green table by the Swiss Football Association up to the 2003–04 Challenge League following the fact that FC Sion were refused their licence for that division.

=== Play-out against relegation ===
Aarau U-21 withdrew from play-outs and were so relegated directly. The one remaining match was played in a neutral venue, on May 25 in Solothurn.

Team 1	Score	Team 2
Stade Nyonnais	2–2	Rapperswil-Jona

FC Stade Nyonnais win 5–4 in the penalty shoot-out. Rapperswil-Jona were relegated. Stade Nyonnais remain at this level.

== Swiss Cup ==
The four winners of the quarter-finals played in the semi-finals. The winners of the first drawn semi-final is considered as home team in the final.

Semi-finals

15 April 2003
20:15
First semi-final

Basel	3–0	Schaffhausen
Esposito 26' (1–0); Chipperfield (yellow card) 65'; Esposito (yellow card) 72'; Tum 90' (2–0); Esposito 90+2' (3–0)	Summary	(yellow card) 18' Leu; (yellow card) 23' Fehr

St. Jakob-Park, Basel
Attendance: 26,960
Referee: (Switzerland) Reto Rutz (Amriswil)

16 April 2003
Second semi-final

Xamax	2–2 (a.e.t.)	Grasshopper Club
Rey 52' (1–2); Rey 65' (2–2)	SFV summary	1' (0–1) Baturina; 45' (0–2) Petrić
Penalties
D'Amico (penalty scored); Barea (penalty scored); Sanou (penalty scored); Leandro (penalty scored); Simo (penalty scored); Portillo (penalty scored); Oppliger (penalty scored); Buess (penalty scored); M'Futi (penalty scored)	9–8	(penalty scored) Gamboa; (penalty scored) Cabanas; (penalty scored) Schwegler; (penalty scored) Núñez; (penalty scored) Baturina; (penalty scored) Eduardo dos Santos; (penalty scored) Castillo; (penalty scored) Digenti; (penalty missed) Spycher

Stade de la Maladière, Neuchâtel
Attendance: 7,600
Referee: (Switzerland) Dieter Schoch (Attiswil)

Final

The final was played in the St. Jakob-Park on 11 May 2003.

11 May 2003
15:00

Basel	6–0	Neuchâtel Xamax
Huggel 13' (1–0); Giménez 35' (2–0); Giménez 43' (3–0); M. Yakin 65' (4–0); Smiljanić 77' (5–0); Barberis 83' (6–0)	Summary	(yellow card) 57' Leandro; (yellow card) 87' Buess

St. Jakob-Park, Basel
Attendance: 31,500 (sold out)
Referee: (Switzerland) René Rogalla (Wallisellen)

== Swiss Clubs in Europe ==
A UEFA Cup place is vacated when a team qualifies for both the Champions League and the UEFA Cup, Basel had achieved the double. When a place is vacated, it is redistributed within the national association by the following rule: The highest-placed team in the league which have not yet qualified for European competitions qualify for the UEFA Cup, with the UEFA Cup qualifiers that finish above them in the league, moved up one "place". Servette as highest placed non-qualified team were granted this vacated place.

- FC Basel as 2001–02 Nationalliga A champions and 2001–02 Swiss Cup winners: Champions League second qualifying round
- Grasshopper Club as runners-up: UEFA Cup first round
- Lugano as third placed team: UEFA Cup qualifying round
- Servette as fourth placed team: UEFA Cup qualifying round
- Zürich as fifth placed team: Intertoto Cup first round
- St. Gallen as sixth placed team: Intertoto Cup first round
- FC Vaduz as 2001–02 Liechtenstein Cup winners: UEFA Cup qualifying round

=== Basel ===
==== Champions League ====
===== Second qualifying round =====
31 July 2002 First leg	Žilina (Slovakia)	1–1	(Switzerland) Basel	Štadión pod Dubňom, Žilina
18:00	Sninský (yellow card) 55'; Barčík 29'	UEFA summary FCB summary	(yellow card) 23' Chipperfield; (yellow card) 32' Esposito; 38' (o.g.) Klago; (yellow card) 84' Varela	Referee: Laurent Duhamel (France)

7 August 2002 Second leg	Basel (Switzerland)	3–0	(Slovakia) Žilina	St. Jakob-Park, Basel
19:30	Giménez 12', 50'; M. Yakin 23'; Esposito (yellow card) 45'	UEFA summary FCB summary	(yellow card) 73' Špendla; (yellow card) 80' Staš	Attendance: 16,562; Referee: Darko Čeferin (Slovenia)

Basel won 4–1 on aggregate

===== Third qualifying round =====
14 August 2002 First leg	Celtic (Scotland)	3–1	(Switzerland) Basel	Celtic Park, Glasgow
20:45	Larsson 3' (pen.); Sutton 52'; Lambert (yellow card) 64'; Sylla 88'	UEFA report FCB summary	2' Giménez; (yellow card) 52' Duruz; (yellow card) 62' H. Yakin; (yellow card) 64' Cantaluppi; (yellow card) 81' Varela	Attendance: 58,520; Referee: Manuel Mejuto González (Spain)

28 August 2002 Second leg	Basel (Switzerland)	2–0	(Scotland) Celtic	St. Jakob-Park, Basel
20:30	Giménez 9'; Rossi (yellow card) 12'; M. Yakin 22'; Varela (yellow card) 42'	UEFA summary FCB summary	(yellow card) 42' Sylla; (yellow card) 42' Guppy	Attendance: 30,510 (sold out); Referee: Anders Frisk (Sweden)

3–3 on aggregate, Basel won on away goals

===== Group stage =====
17 September 2002 Matchday 1	Basel (Switzerland)	2–0	(Russia) Spartak Moscow	St. Jakob-Park, Basel
20:45	H. Yakin 50'; Rossi 55'	UEFA summary FCB summary		Attendance: 29,500 (sold out); Referee: Claus Bo Larsen (Denmark)

25 September 2002 Matchday 2	Liverpool (England)	1–1	(Switzerland) Basel	Anfield, Liverpool
20:45	Baroš 34'	UEFA summary FCB summary	Rossi 43'	Attendance: 37,643; Referee: Dick van Egmond (Netherlands)

2 October 2002 Matchday 3	Valencia (Spain)	6–2	(Switzerland) Basel	Estadio Mestalla, Valencia
20:45	Carew 10', 13'; Aurélio 17'; Baraja 28'; Aimar 58'; Mista 60'; Ayala (yellow card) 89'	UEFA summary FCB summary	Rossi 46'; H. Yakin 90'	Attendance: 27,394; Referee: Cosimo Bolognino (Italy)

22 October 2002 Matchday 4	Basel (Switzerland)	2–2	(Spain) Valencia	St. Jakob-Park, Basel
20:45	Ergić 32', 90'	UEFA summary FCB summary	Baraja 36'; Torres 72'	Attendance: 29,500 (sold out); Referee: Helmut Fleischer (Germany)

5 November 2002 Matchday 5	Spartak Moscow (Russia)	0–2	(Switzerland) Basel	Dynamo Stadium, Moscow
18:00		UEFA summary FCB summary	Rossi 18'; Giménez 89'	Attendance: 5,000; Referee: Stuart Dougal (Scotland)

12 November 2002 Matchday 6	Basel (Switzerland)	3–3	(England) Liverpool	St. Jakob-Park, Basel
20:45	Rossi 2'; Giménez 22'; Atouba 29'	UEFA summary FCB summary	Murphy 61'; Šmicer 64'; Owen 85'	Attendance: 29,500 (sold out); Referee: Claude Colombo (France)

Final group table

Pos	Team	Pld	W	D	L	GF	GA	GD	Pts	Qualification	VAL	BAS	LIV	SPA
1	(Spain) Valencia	6	5	1	0	17	4	+13	16	Advance to second group stage	—	6–2	2–0	3–0
2	(Switzerland) Basel	6	2	3	1	12	12	0	9	Advance to second group stage	2–2	—	3–3	2–0
3	(England) Liverpool	6	2	2	2	12	8	+4	8	Transfer to UEFA Cup	0–1	1–1	—	5–0
4	(Russia) Spartak Moscow	6	0	0	6	1	18	−17	0		0–3	0–2	1–3	—

Source: RSSSF

===== Second group stage =====
26 November 2002 Matchday 1	Basel (Switzerland)	1–3	(England) Manchester United	St. Jakob-Park, Basel
20:45	Giménez 1'; Zwyssig (yellow card) 19'; Atouba (yellow card) 72'	UEFA summary FCB summary	(yellow card) 14' Scholes; (yellow card) 22' Fortune; 62', 63' van Nistelrooy; (yellow card) 66' Verón; 68' Solskjær	Attendance: 35,000 (sold out); Referee: Valentin Ivanov (Russia)

11 December 2002 Matchday 2	Juventus (Italy)	4–0	(Switzerland) Basel	Stadio delle Alpi, Turin
20:45	Trezeguet 3'; Montero 34'; Tacchinardi 43'; Del Piero 51' (pen.); Iuliano (yellow card) 53'	UEFA summary FCB summary	(yellow card) 50' Esposito; (yellow card) 72' H. Yakin	Attendance: 22,639; Referee: Lucílio Batista (Portugal)

19 February 2003 Matchday 3	Basel (Switzerland)	1–0	(Spain) Deportivo La Coruña	St. Jakob-Park, Basel
20:45	Yakin 30'	UEFA summary FCB summary		Attendance: 29,031; Referee: René Temmink (Netherlands)

25 February 2003 Matchday 4	Deportivo La Coruña (Spain)	1–0	(Switzerland) Basel	Estadio Riazor, A Coruña
20:45	Tristán 4'	UEFA summary FCB summary		Attendance: 27,000; Referee: Stéphane Bré (France)

12 March 2003 Matchday 5	Manchester United (England)	1–1	(Switzerland) Basel	Old Trafford, Manchester
20:45	G. Neville 53'	UEFA summary FCB summary	Giménez 14'	Attendance: 66,870 (sold out); Referee: Claus Bo Larsen (Denmark)

18 March 2003 Matchday 6	Basel (Switzerland)	2–1	(Italy) Juventus	St. Jakob-Park, Basel
20:45	Cantaluppi 38'; Giménez 90+2'	UEFA summary FCB summary	Tacchinardi 10'	Attendance: 30,501 (sold out); Referee: Wolfgang Stark (Germany)

Final group table

Pos	Team	Pld	W	D	L	GF	GA	GD	Pts	Qualification	MU	JUV	BAS	DEP
1	(England) Manchester United	6	4	1	1	11	5	+6	13	Advance to knockout stage	—	2–1	1–1	2–0
2	(Italy) Juventus	6	2	1	3	11	11	0	7	Advance to knockout stage	0–3	—	4–0	3–2
3	(Switzerland) Basel	6	2	1	3	5	10	−5	7		1–3	2–1	—	1–0
4	(Spain) Deportivo La Coruña	6	2	1	3	7	8	−1	7		2–0	2–2	1–0	—

Source: RSSSF

=== Grasshopper Club ===
==== UEFA Cup ====
===== First round =====
19 September 2002 First leg	Grasshopper (Switzerland)	3–1	(Russia) Zenit Saint Petersburg	Hardturm, Zürich
19:30	Baturina 6'; Barijho 44'; Núñez 53'	Report	Kerzhakov 33'	Attendance: 2,300; Referee: Emil Bozinovski (Macedonia)

3 October 2002 Second leg	Zenit Saint Petersburg (Russia)	2–1	(Switzerland) Grasshopper	Petrovsky Stadium, Saint Petersburg
17:00	Kerzhakov 7', 19'	Report	Baturina 89'	Attendance: 17,000; Referee: Orhan Erdemir (Turkey)

Grasshopper won 4–3 on aggregate.

===== Second round =====
31 October 2002 First leg	PAOK (Greece)	2–1	(Switzerland) Grasshoppers	Toumba Stadium, Thessaloniki
20:00	Chasiotis 3'; Yiasoumi 48'	Report	Núñez 64' (pen.)	Attendance: 9,577; Referee: Luc Huyghe (Belgium)

14 November 2002 Second leg	Grasshoppers (Switzerland)	1–1	(Greece) PAOK	Hardturm, Zürich
20:15	Cabanas 45'	Report	Markos 90'	Attendance: 6,600; Referee: Martin Hansson (Sweden)

PAOK won 3–2 on aggregate.

=== Lugano ===
==== UEFA Cup ====
===== Qualifying round =====
15 August 2002 First leg	Ventspils (Latvia)	3–0	(Switzerland) Lugano	Ventspils Olimpiskais Stadions, Ventspils
17:00	Landyrev 40', 67'; Rimkus 58'	Report		Attendance: 1,200; Referee: Peter Fröjdfeldt (Sweden)

29 August 2002 Second leg	Lugano (Switzerland)	1–0	(Latvia) Ventspils	Cornaredo Stadium, Lugano
20:00	Andreoli 56'	Report		Attendance: 4,200; Referee: Dejan Stanišić (FR Yugoslavia)

Ventspils won 3–1 on aggregate.

=== Servette ===
==== UEFA Cup ====
===== Qualifying round =====
15 August 2002 First leg	Spartak Yerevan (Armenia)	0–2	(Switzerland) Servette	Vazgen Sargsyan Republican Stadium, Yerevan
15:00		Report	Kader 72', 84'	Attendance: 7,000; Referee: Krzysztof Słupik (Poland)

29 August 2002 Second leg	Servette (Switzerland)	3–0	(Armenia) Spartak Yerevan	Charmilles Stadium, Geneva
19:30	Diogo 38', 43'; Frei 77'	Report		Attendance: 2,200; Referee: Anthony Zammit (Malta)

Servette won 5–0 on aggregate.

===== First round =====
19 September 2002 First leg	Servette (Switzerland)	2–3	(Poland) Amica Wronki	Charmilles Stadium, Geneva
20:15	Obradović 26'; Frei 59'	Report	Król 62', 85'; Zieńczuk 70'	Attendance: 2,641; Referee: Michael Weiner (Germany)

3 October 2002 Second leg	Amica Wronki (Poland)	1–2	(Switzerland) Servette	Stadion Amica, Wronki
18:00	Frei 35', 88'	Report	Burkhardt 60'	Attendance: 1,500; Referee: Dejan Delević (FR Yugoslavia)

4–4 on aggregate. Amica Wronki won on away goals.

=== Zürich ===
==== Intertoto Cup ====
===== First round =====
22 June 2002 First leg	Zürich (Switzerland)	7–0	(Bosnia and Herzegovina) Brotnjo	Letzigrund, Zürich
	Keita 5', 33'; Akalé 63', 70', 72', 90'; Gygax 67'			Attendance: 1,100; Referee: Augustus Constantin (Romania)

29 June 2002 Second leg	Brotnjo (Bosnia and Herzegovina)	2–1	(Switzerland) Zürich	Bare Stadium, Čitluk
	Ćorić 67'; Krivić 77'		Keita 50'	Attendance: 138; Referee: Costas Theodotou (Cyprus)

Zürich won 8–2 on aggregate.

===== Second round =====
6 July 2002 First leg	Zürich (Switzerland)	1–0	(Estonia) Levadia	Letzigrund, Zürich
	Tarone 87' (pen.)			Attendance: 1,100; Referee: Karen Nalbandyan (Armenia)

13 July 2002 Second leg	Levadia (Estonia)	0–0	(Switzerland) Zürich	Kadriorg Stadium, Tallinn
				Attendance: 820; Referee: Drago Kos (Slovenia)

Zürich won 1–0 on aggregate.

===== Third round =====
20 July 2002 First leg	Zürich (Switzerland)	2–0	(England) Aston Villa	Hardturm, Zürich
	Keita 32'; Yasar 83'			Attendance: 4,560; Referee: Florian Meyer (Germany)

27 July 2002 Second leg	Aston Villa (England)	3–0	(Switzerland) Zürich	Villa Park, Birmingham
	Boulding 33'; Allbäck 52'; Staunton 77'			Attendance: 18,349; Referee: Roberto Rosetti (Italy)

Aston Villa won 3–2 on aggregate.

=== St. Gallen ===
==== Intertoto Cup ====
===== First round =====
22 June 2002 First leg	St. Gallen (Switzerland)	5–1	(Faroe Islands) B68 Toftir	Espenmoos, St. Gallen
	Tachie-Mensah 9', 82' (pen.), 90+'; Gane 42' (pen.); Imhof 56'		J.I. Petersen 76'	Attendance: 5,700; Referee: Sokol Jareci (Albania)

29 June 2002 Second leg	B68 Toftir (Faroe Islands)	0–6	(Switzerland) St. Gallen	Svangaskarð, Toftir
			Tachie-Mensah 5'; Gane 14', 73', 85'; Imhof 40'; Bieli 61'	Attendance: 145; Referee: Darius Miezelis (Lithuania)

St. Gallen won 11–1 on aggregate.

===== Second round =====
6 July 2002 First leg	Willem II (Netherlands)	1–0	(Switzerland) St. Gallen	Koning Willem II Stadion, Tilburg
	Caluwé 14'			Attendance: 2,937; Referee: Romāns Lajuks (Latvia)

13 July 2002 Second leg	St. Gallen (Switzerland)	1–1 (a.e.t.)	(Netherlands) Willem II	Espenmoos, St. Gallen
	Nixon 90+'		Meriana 112'	Attendance: 2,400; Referee: Martin Hansson (Sweden)

Willem II won 2–1 on aggregate.

=== Vaduz ===
==== UEFA Cup ====
===== Qualifying round =====
13 August 2002 First leg	Vaduz (Liechtenstein)	1–1	(Scotland) Livingston	Rheinpark Stadion, Vaduz
18:00	Burgmeier 61'	Report	Rubio 51'	Attendance: 1,300; Referee: Siniša Zrnić (Bosnia and Herzegovina)

29 August 2002 Second leg	Livingston (Scotland)	0–0	(Liechtenstein) Vaduz	Almondvale Stadium, Livingston
20:30		Report		Attendance: 7,419; Referee: Ivan Novak (Croatia)

1–1 on aggregate. Livingston won on away goals.

== Sources ==
- Switzerland 2002–03 at RSSSF
- 1. Liga season 2002–03 at the official website
- Switzerland Cup 2002–03 at RSSSF
- Cup finals at Fussball-Schweiz
- UEFA Intertoto Cup 2002 at RSSSF
- Josef Zindel (2018). FC Basel 1893. Die ersten 125 Jahre (in German). Basel: Friedrich Reinhardt Verlag. ISBN 978-3-7245-2305-5.

Preceded by 2001–02	Seasons in Swiss football	Succeeded by 2003–04
