= 2003–04 in Swiss football =

Football in Switzerland
- Season: 2003–04

Men's football
- Super League: Basel
- Challenge League: Schaffhausen
- 1. Liga: Group 1: Étoile Carouge; Group 2: YF Juventus; Group 3: Locarno
- Swiss Cup: FC Wil

Women's football
- Swiss Women's Super League: FC Sursee
- Swiss Cup: FC Sursee

The following is a summary of the 2003–04 season of competitive football in Switzerland.

== Super League ==
=== Final league table ===
Pos	Team	Pld	W	D	L	GF	GA	GD	Pts	Qualification or relegation
1	Basel (C)	36	26	7	3	86	32	+54	85	Qualification to Champions League third qualifying round
2	Young Boys	36	22	6	8	75	48	+27	72	Qualification to Champions League second qualifying round
3	Servette	36	15	7	14	61	62	−1	52	Qualification to UEFA Cup second qualifying round
4	Zürich	36	14	8	14	58	52	+6	50	
5	St. Gallen	36	14	8	14	54	57	−3	50	
6	Thun	36	13	10	13	51	57	−6	49	Qualification to Intertoto Cup second round
7	Grasshopper	36	12	5	19	62	74	−12	41	
8	Aarau	36	9	11	16	57	69	−12	38	
9	Neuchâtel Xamax	36	10	6	20	46	63	−17	36	Qualification to relegation play-off
10	Wil (R)	36	7	8	21	37	73	−36	29	Relegation to Swiss Challenge League

Source: RSSSF
Rules for classification: 1) points; 2) goal difference; 3) number of goals scored.
(C) Champions; (R) Relegated

== Challenge League ==
=== Final league table ===
Pos	Team	Pld	W	D	L	GF	GA	GD	BP	Pts	Promotion or relegation
1	FC Schaffhausen (C, P)	32	17	9	6	52	39	+13	24	84	Promotion to 2004–05 Swiss Super League
2	FC Vaduz	32	16	9	7	56	34	+22	22	79	Qualification for Promotion play-off
3	FC Chiasso	32	16	6	10	49	31	+18	24	78	
4	FC Malcantone Agno (Note: FC Malcantone Agno merged with AC Lugano, who will replace the club for the 2004-05 season.)	32	16	7	9	48	38	+10	18	73	
5	FC Wohlen	32	12	14	6	46	39	+7	22	72	
6	FC Sion (Note: FC Sion was admitted into the league on 29 October 2003. Because of the late fixtures, the club's season ended later)	32	13	11	8	47	33	+14	20	70	
7	Yverdon-Sport FC	32	12	10	10	50	37	+13	24	70	
8	SC Kriens	32	14	7	11	44	40	+4	18	67	
9	FC Concordia Basel	32	15	6	11	54	48	+6	14	65	
10	FC Lucerne	32	12	10	10	46	43	+3	18	64	
11	AC Bellinzona	32	13	3	16	47	58	−11	14	56	
12	FC Bulle	32	9	10	13	42	54	−12	12	49	
13	FC Meyrin	32	9	10	13	43	53	−10	10	47	
14	FC Baden	32	9	4	19	38	57	−19	10	41	
15	FC Winterthur	32	8	6	18	38	47	−9	10	40	
16	FC La Chaux-de-Fonds	32	7	7	18	25	47	−22	8	36	
17	SR Delémont (R)	32	6	7	19	37	64	−27	4	29	Relegated to 2004–05 Swiss 1. Liga

Source: RSSSF
Rules for classification: During the season, the winner of each confrontation return received 2 bonus points. This system will be abolished for the 2004-05 season
(C) Champions; (P) Promoted; (R) Relegated

== 1. Liga ==
=== Group 1 ===
Pos	Team	Pld	W	D	L	GF	GA	GD	Pts	Qualification or relegation
1	Étoile Carouge FC	28	21	4	3	58	18	+40	67	Play-off to Challenge League
2	FC Baulmes	28	19	2	7	63	32	+31	59	Play-off to Challenge League
3	ES FC Malley	28	16	8	4	67	40	+27	56	Play-off to Challenge League
4	FC Martigny-Sports	28	15	8	5	52	25	+27	53	
5	CS Chênois	28	14	4	10	54	51	+3	46	
6	Servette U-21	28	10	5	13	36	45	−9	35	
7	FC Fribourg	28	9	8	11	42	53	−11	35	
8	FC Naters	28	9	8	11	35	49	−14	35	
9	FC Stade Lausanne Ouchy	28	9	7	12	40	36	+4	34	
10	Grand-Lancy FC	28	10	3	15	36	51	−15	33	
11	FC Echallens	28	8	7	13	45	51	−6	31	
12	FC Stade Nyonnais	28	6	13	9	30	40	−10	31	
13	FC Bex	28	9	4	15	34	53	−19	31	
14	Vevey Sports	28	5	5	18	35	57	−22	20	Play-out against relegation
15	FC Sierre	28	5	4	19	37	63	−26	19	Relegation to 2. Liga Interregional
16	FC Sion	0	0	0	0	0	0	0	0	FC Sion were admitted to the Challenge League on 29 October 2003

Source: Erste Liga official website
Rules for classification: 1) Points; 2) Goal difference within the league or play-off for qualifiers.

=== Group 2 ===
Pos	Team	Pld	W	D	L	GF	GA	GD	Pts	Qualification or relegation
1	SC Young Fellows Juventus	30	18	8	4	66	34	+32	62	Play-off to Challenge League
2	Basel U-21	30	18	5	7	70	46	+24	59	Not eligible to Play-offs
3	FC Wangen bei Olten	30	16	6	8	58	41	+17	54	Play-off to Challenge League
4	FC Biel-Bienne	30	14	8	8	52	34	+18	50	
5	FC Red Star Zürich	30	14	6	10	55	48	+7	48	
6	FC Solothurn	30	14	6	10	47	49	−2	48	
7	Zürich U-21	30	13	7	10	46	40	+6	46	
8	FC Grenchen	30	13	6	11	50	49	+1	45	
9	SC Dornach	30	13	5	12	55	62	−7	44	
10	Grasshopper Club U-21	30	11	9	10	49	43	+6	42	
11	FC Münsingen	30	11	7	12	36	38	−2	40	
12	FC Serrières	30	10	7	13	35	41	−6	37	
13	Young Boys U-21	30	8	8	14	55	49	+6	32	
14	FC Seefeld Zürich	30	9	3	18	45	60	−15	30	
15	FC Altstetten	30	3	8	19	25	69	−44	17	Play-out against relegation
16	FC Colombier	30	4	3	23	24	65	−41	15	Relegation to 2. Liga Interregional

Source: Erste Liga official website
Rules for classification: 1) Points; 2) Goal difference within the league or play-off for qualifiers.

=== Group 3 ===
Pos	Team	Pld	W	D	L	GF	GA	GD	Pts	Qualification or relegation
1	FC Locarno	30	16	10	4	56	28	+28	58	Play-off to Challenge League
2	FC Kreuzlingen	30	14	12	4	49	26	+23	54	Play-off to Challenge League
3	FC Tuggen	30	13	14	3	58	34	+24	53	Play-off to Challenge League
4	FC Schötz	30	15	8	7	51	36	+15	53	
5	SC Buochs	30	14	11	5	40	28	+12	53	
6	FC Mendrisio	30	14	7	9	60	43	+17	49	
7	Zug 94	30	13	8	9	42	38	+4	47	
8	FC Gossau	30	10	8	12	40	52	−12	38	
9	FC Chur 97	30	9	10	11	31	46	−15	37	
10	Luzern U-21	30	8	9	13	40	49	−9	33	
11	FC Frauenfeld	30	10	3	17	43	60	−17	33	
12	St. Gallen U-21	30	7	9	14	37	46	−9	30	
13	SC Cham	30	7	9	14	34	48	−14	30	
14	GC Biaschesi	30	7	8	15	47	54	−7	29	
15	SC Zofingen	30	7	8	15	41	58	−17	29	Relegation to 2. Liga Interregional
16	SV Schaffhausen	30	5	8	17	23	46	−23	23	Relegation to 2. Liga Interregional

Source: Erste Liga official website
Rules for classification: 1) Points; 2) Goal difference within the league or play-off for qualifiers.

=== Promotion play-off ===
==== Qualification round ====
Team 1	Score	Team 2
Tuggen	3–1	Étoile Carouge
Étoile Carouge	3–2	Tuggen

Tuggen win 5–4 on aggregate and continue to the finals.

Team 1	Score	Team 2
Malley	1–0	YFJ
YFJ	0–3	Malley

Young Fellows Juventus win 3–1 on aggregate and continue to the finals.

Team 1	Score	Team 2
Wangen b.O.	1–1	Locarno
Locarno	0–0	Wangen b.O.

1–1 on aggregate, Locarno win on away goals and continue to the finals.

Team 1	Score	Team 2
Kreuzlingen	1–2	Baulmes
Baulmes	3–2	Kreuzlingen

Baulmes win 5–3 on aggregate and continue to the finals.

==== Final round ====
Team 1	Score	Team 2
Tuggen	3–2	YFJ
YFJ	3–0	Tuggen

Young Fellows Juventus win 5–3 on aggregate and are promoted to 2004–05 Challenge League.

Team 1	Score	Team 2
Locarno	1–1	Baulmes
Baulmes	2–1	Locarno

Baulmes win 3–2 on aggregate and are promoted to 2004–05 Challenge League.

== Swiss Cup ==
=== Semi-finals ===
Team 1	Score	Team 2
3 March 2004
Grasshoppers	6–5 (a.e.t.)	FC Zürich
4 March 2004
FC St. Gallen	1–2	FC Wil

=== Final ===
12 April 2004
15:00

Grasshoppers	3 – 2	FC Wil
Núñez 8'; Cabanas 19'; Tararache (yellow card) 25' (yellow-red card) 45'; Lichtsteiner (yellow card) 39'; Spycher (yellow card) 62'; Mitreski (yellow card) 78'	Report	5' Rogerio; 30' (pen.), 79' (pen.) Fabinho; (yellow card) 78' Blunschi

St. Jakob-Park, Basel
Attendance: 22,500
Referee: (Switzerland) Guido Wildhaber

== Swiss Clubs in Europe ==
- Grasshopper Club as 2002–03 Nationalliga A champions: Champions League third qualifying round
- Basel as 2002–03 Swiss Cup winners: UEFA Cup first round
- Neuchâtel Xamax as third placed team last season: UEFA Cup qualifying round
- Young Boys as fourth placed team: UEFA Cup qualifying round
- Thun: Intertoto Cup second round
- Wil: Intertoto Cup first round
- Vaduz as 2002–03 Liechtenstein Cup winners: UEFA Cup qualifying round

=== Grasshopper Club ===
==== Champions League ====
===== Third qualifying round =====
13 August 2003 First leg	Grasshopper Club (Switzerland)	1–0	(Greece) AEK Athens	Hardturm, Zürich
20:30	Núñez 83'	Report		Attendance: 12,400; Referee: Éric Poulat (France)

27 August 2003 Second leg	AEK Athens (Greece)	3–1	(Switzerland) Grasshopper Club	Leoforos Alexandras Stadium, Athens
20:30	Katsouranis 20'; Liberopoulos 25'; Castillo 39' (o.g.)	Report	Núñez 68'	Attendance: 16,045; Referee: Lucílio Batista (Portugal)

AEK Athens won 3–2 on aggregate. Grasshoppers transfer to UEFA Cup.

==== UEFA Cup ====
===== First round =====
24 September 2003 First leg	Grasshopper Club (Switzerland)	1–1	(Croatia) Hajduk Split	Hardturm, Zürich
19:30	Eduardo 40'	Report	Neretljak 56'	Attendance: 8,100; Referee: Alan Kelly (Republic of Ireland)

15 October 2003 Second leg	Hajduk Split (Croatia)	0–0	(Switzerland) Grasshopper Club	Stadion Poljud, Split
17:30		Report		Attendance: 15,833; Referee: Ruud Bossen (Netherlands)

1–1 on aggregate. Hajduk Split won on away goals.

=== Basel ===
==== UEFA Cup ====
===== First round =====
24 September 2003 1st Leg	Malatyaspor (Turkey)	0–2	(Switzerland) Basel	Malatya İnönü Stadium, Malatya
19:00	Akagünduz (yellow card) 25'	Report	15' (yellow card) 51' M. Yakin; (yellow card) 51' Zuberbühler; 75' H. Yakin	Attendance: 10,000 (sold out); Referee: Marian Mircea Salomir (Rom)

15 October 2003 2nd Leg	Basel (Switzerland)	1–2 (a.e.t.) (3–2 agg.)	(Turkey) Malatyaspor	St. Jakob-Park, Basel
19:30	Huggel (yellow card) 16'; Streller 95'	Report	(yellow card) 25' Birlik; 65', 85' Koçak; (yellow card) 93' Bensol; (yellow card) 102' Domies Junior De-Azevedo Elias	Attendance: 26,663; Referee: Attila Juhos (Hungary)

Basel win 3-2 on aggregate after extra time.

==== Second round ====
6 November 2003 1st Leg	Basel (Switzerland)	2–3	(England) Newcastle United	St. Jakob-Park, Basel
20:30	Cantaluppi 11'; Chipperfield 15'; P. Degen (yellow card) 29'	Report	13' Robert; 37' Bramble; 75' Ameobi	Attendance: 30,000 (sold out); Referee: Tom Henning Øvrebø, (Norway)

27 November 2003 2nd Leg	Newcastle United (England)	1–0	(Switzerland) Basel	St James' Park, Newcastle upon Tyne
20:30	Shearer (yellow card) 1'; Smiljanić 14' (o.g.)	Report	(yellow card) 27' Cantaluppi	Attendance: 45,000; Referee: Knud Erik Fisker (Denmark)

Newcastle win 4-2 on aggregate.

=== Xamax ===
==== UEFA Cup ====
===== Qualifying round =====
12 August 2003 First leg	Valletta (Malta)	0–2	(Switzerland) Neuchâtel Xamax	Ta' Qali National Stadium, Valletta
19:30		Report	Griffiths 18'; Mangane 35'	Attendance: 815; Referee: Kuddusi Müftüoğlu (Turkey)

28 August 2003 Second leg	Neuchâtel Xamax (Switzerland)	2–0	(Malta) Valletta	La Maladière, Neuchâtel
20:15	Griffiths 45'; Portillo 90'	Report		Attendance: 2,300; Referee: Paulius Malžinskas (Lithuania)

Neuchâtel Xamax won 4–0 on aggregate.

===== First round =====
24 September 2003 First leg	Auxerre (France)	1–0	(Switzerland) Neuchâtel Xamax	Stade Abbé-Deschamps, Auxerre
20:45	Kalou 6'	Report		Attendance: 6,155; Referee: Anton Genov (Bulgaria)

15 October 2003 Second leg	Neuchâtel Xamax (Switzerland)	0–1	(France) Auxerre	La Maladière, Neuchâtel
20:15		Report	Lachuer 53'	Attendance: 5,585; Referee: Andy D'Urso (England)

Auxerre won 2–0 on aggregate.

=== Young Boys ===
==== UEFA Cup ====
===== Qualifying round =====
14 August 2003 First leg	MyPa (Finland)	3–2	(Switzerland) Young Boys	Saviniemen Jalkapallostadion, Anjalankoski
17:05	Okkonen 2' (pen.), 71' (pen.); Luiz Antônio 23'	Report	Leandro 19'; Magnin 57'	Attendance: 1,515; Referee: Georgios Borovilos (Greece)

28 August 2003 Second leg	Young Boys (Switzerland)	2–2	(Finland) MyPa	Wankdorf Stadium, Bern
19:30	Sermeter 24', 77'	Report	Luiz Antônio 71'; Taipale 86'	Attendance: 7,264; Referee: Nikolay Ivanov (Russia)

MyPa won 5–4 on aggregate.

=== Thun ===
==== 2003 UEFA Intertoto Cup ====
===== Second round =====
5 July 2003 First leg	Thun (Switzerland)	2–3	(Czech Republic) Brno	Stadion Lachen, Thun
	Aegerter 42'; Rama 75'	Report	Živný 10'; Zúbek 76'; Pacanda 83'	Attendance: 2,050; Referee: Kostadin Kostadinov (Bulgaria)

12 July 2003 Second leg	Brno (Czech Republic)	1–1	(Switzerland) Thun	Stadion na Lesní ulici, Břeclav
	Kroupa 11'	Report	Raimondi 63'	Attendance: 2,110; Referee: Romāns Lajuks (Latvia)

Brno won 4–3 on aggregate.

=== Wil ===
==== 2003 UEFA Intertoto Cup ====
===== First round =====
21 June 2003 First leg	Dinaburg (Latvia)	1–0	(Switzerland) Wil	Celtnieks Stadium, Daugavpils
	Čugunovs 28'	Report		Attendance: 700; Referee: Zbigniew Marczyk (Poland)

29 June 2003 Second leg	Wil (Switzerland)	2–0	(Latvia) Dinaburg	Stadion Bergholz, Wil
	Callà 22'; Lustrinelli 45'	Report		Attendance: 1,550; Referee: Goran Mihaljević (Serbia and Montenegro)

Wil won 2–1 on aggregate.

===== Second round =====
5 July 2003 First leg	Willem II Tilburg (Netherlands)	2–1	(Switzerland) Wil	Koning Willem II Stadion, Tilburg
	Sektioui 9'; Landzaat 70' (pen.)	Report	Callà 32'	Attendance: 2,797; Referee: Levan Paniashvili (Georgia)

12 July 2003 Second leg	Wil (Switzerland)	3–1	(Netherlands) Willem II Tilburg	Stadion Bergholz, Wil
	Lustrinelli 4', 78'; Romano 84' (pen.)	Report	Caluwé 61'	Attendance: 1,800; Referee: Espen Berntsen (Norway)

Wil won 4–3 on aggregate.

===== Third round =====
19 July 2003 First leg	Nantes (France)	2–1	(Switzerland) Wil	Stade René Gaillard, Niort
	N'Zigou 50'; Pujol 86'	Report	Rogério 23'	Attendance: 3,414; Referee: Michael Ross (Northern Ireland)

26 July 2003 Second leg	Wil (Switzerland)	2–3	(France) Nantes	Stadion Bergholz, Wil
	Romano 10' (pen.); Mordeku 23'	Report	Yepes 12'; Vahirua 43'; Pujol 64'	Attendance: 2,080; Referee: Jörg Keßler (Germany)

Nantes won 5–3 on aggregate.

=== Vaduz ===
==== UEFA Cup ====
===== Qualifying round =====
14 August 2003 First leg	Vaduz (Liechtenstein)	0–1	(Ukraine) Dnipro Dnipropetrovsk	Rheinpark Stadion, Vaduz
19:30		Report	Rykun 88'	Attendance: 750; Referee: Pavel Saliy (Kazakhstan)

28 August 2003 Second leg	Dnipro Dnipropetrovsk (Ukraine)	1–0	(Liechtenstein) Vaduz	Meteor Stadium, Dnipropetrovsk
17:00	Rykun 75'	Report		Attendance: 8,500; Referee: Zöhrab Gadiyev (Azerbaijan)

Dnipro Dnipropetrovsk won 2–0 on aggregate.

== Sources ==
- Switzerland 2003–04 at RSSSF
- Switzerland Cup 2003–04 at RSSSF
- 1. Liga season 2003–04 at the official website
- Cup finals at Fussball-Schweiz
- Josef Zindel (2018). FC Basel 1893. Die ersten 125 Jahre (in German). Basel: Friedrich Reinhardt Verlag. ISBN 978-3-7245-2305-5.

Preceded by 2003–04	Seasons in Swiss football	Succeeded by 2005–06
