= 2002–03 Swiss Cup =

Tournament details
- Country: Switzerland

Final positions
- Champions: Basel
- Runners-up: Neuchâtel Xamax

The 2002–03 Swiss Cup was the 78th season of Switzerland's cup competition held annually by the Swiss Football Association (SFV-ASF). It began on 9 August with the first games of Round 1 and ended on 11 May 2003 with the Final held at St. Jakob-Park, Basel. The cup winners qualified for a place in the first round of the UEFA Cup.

== Overview ==
This season's cup competition began on the week-end 9, 10–11 August with the first round. The competition ended on Sunday 11 May 2003 with the final, which was held for the third time in succession at the St. Jakob-Park in Basel. The 48 clubs from the 2002–03 Swiss 1. Liga were granted byes for the first round and were to join the competition in the second round. The 11 clubs from the Nationalliga B were granted byes for the first three rounds. The Liechtensteiner football club Vaduz who played their league season in the NLB competed only in the Liechtenstein Cup and were not admitted to the Swiss Cup. The 12 clubs from the Nationalliga A were granted byes for the first four rounds. The winners of the cup were to qualify for the first round of the first round of the UEFA Cup in the following season.

When possible, the draw respected regionalities and the lower classed team was granted home advantage. In the entire competition, the matches were played in a single knockout format. In the event of a draw after 90 minutes, the match went into extra time. In the event of a draw at the end of extra time, a penalty shoot-out was to decide which team qualified for the next round. No replays were foreseen in the entire competition.

== Round 1 ==
In the first round a total of 136 amateur clubs participated from the fourth-tier and lower. Reserve teams were not admitted to the competition, however the U-21 teams who played in the fourth-tier were qualified. The draw respected regionalities, when possible, and the lower classed team was granted home advantage.

Team 1	Score	Team 2
9 August 2002
FC Espagnol Lausanne	1–14	Lausanne-Sport U-21
Young Boys U-21	7–0	Köniz
FC Saxon Sports	2–3 (a.e.t.)	US Collombey-Muraz
Kickers Luzern	1–0	FC Sursee
10 August 2002
FC Collex-Bossy	3–0	FC Crissier
FC Saint-Imier	2–5	FC Stade Payerne
FC Olten	2–3	Muttenz
FC Polizei Zürich	0–2	FC Brugg
FC Schwamendingen	3–1	Red Star
FC Widnau	2–3	Brühl
Old Boys	1–0 (a.e.t.)	Dornach
FC Lancy-Sports	4–1	FC Dardania Lausanne
FC Fortuna (SG)	1–2 (a.e.t.)	FC Rorschach
AS Timau Basel	1–5	Nordstern Basel
FC Ebikon	3–2	SC Schöftland
Bazenheid	4–1	FC Beringen
FC Tavannes/Tramelan	2–4 (a.e.t.)	FC Breitenbach
Bülach	0–3	Winterthur U-21
FC Landquart-Herrschaft	2–3 (a.e.t.)	Freienbach
FC Kirchberg	2–0	FC Oberwinterthur
FC Portalban/Gletterens	0–1 (a.e.t.)	Le Locle Sports
Düdingen	6–0	FC Langenthal
11 August 2002
FC Geneva	3–4 (a.e.t.)	Signal FC (Bernex)
FC Oberglatt	1–4	FC Kilchberg-Rüschlikon
FC Abtwil-Engelburg	2–1	SC Veltheim (Winterthur)
FC Ependes	1–3	FC Valmont
FC Salgesch	3–5 (a.e.t.)	Montreux-Sports
SC Baudepartment Basel	3–2	FC Subingen
FC Rafz	2–7	FC Wülfingen
FC Amriswil	3–1	FC Horgen
AC Vallemaggia	1–2	FC Ascona
FC Onex	0–1	A.P. Genève
FC Étoile-Laconnex	2–1	US Terre Sainte
Lugano U-21	4–0	AC Basso Malcatone
13 August 2002
FC Seuzach	2–2 (a.e.t.) (4–3 p)	FC Wittenbach
FC Spiez	1–5	Dürrenast
FC Schönbühl	2–3	Bümpliz
FC Vignoble	1–5	FC Renens
Bavois	3–1	FC Deportivo
SC Hota Luzern	1–2	Hochdorf
FC Zürich Affoltern	0–4	FC Regensdorf
FC Concordia LS	0–3	FC Epalinges
FC Visp	2–3	FC Sierre
FC Raron	1–5	Monthey
FC Klus-Balsthal	4–4 (a.e.t.) (3–5 p)	FC Alle
FC Rüti	0–1	Cham
SC Goldau	1–2	FC St. Margrethen
AS Lamone-Cadempino	1–3	US Verscio
ASI Audax-Friul	1–1 (a.e.t.) (5–4 p)	FC La Tour/Le Pâquier
FC Fontenais	0–3	Laufen
FC Überstorf	0–1	Belfaux
FC Küssnacht	1–3	FC Bodio
14 August 2002
FC Orpund	1–3	FC Ostermundigen
Herzogenbuchsee	3–1	FC Aarberg
Breitenrain	3–1	FC Konolfingen
Echallens U-21	5–2	FC Châtel-St-Denis
CS Romontis	1–2	Xamax U-21
FC Savièse	1–6	Sion U-21
FC Sempach	0–2	SC Emmen
FC Glattbrugg	0–10	FC Seefeld Zürich
Wettingen 93	2–1	FC Lenzburg
FC Dietikon	2–3	Inter Club Zurigo
FC Wetzikon	2–4 (a.e.t.)	Herisau
FC Ebnat-Kappel	2–3 (a.e.t.)	FC Hinwil
FC Sargans	1–2	FC Schmerikon
FC Cornol	0–5	FC Courtételle
FC Hünibach	0–6	SV Lyss
FC Urdorf	0–7	FC Eschenbach

== Round 2 ==
The 54 teams, including the U-21 teams, from the 2002–03 1. Liga that had been granted byes for the first round, joined the competition in this the second round. These teams were seeded and cound not be drawn against each other. The draw respected regionalities, when possible, and the lower classed team was granted the home advantage.

Team 1	Score	Team 2
22 August 2002
FC Kilchberg-Rüschlikon	1–4	FC Altstetten (Zürich)
24 August 2002
FC Collex-Bossy	0–4	Servette U-21
FC Sierre	0–4	ES Malley
Bümpliz	1–6	Bulle
FC Courtételle	3–1	Vevey Sports
Kickers Luzern	0–2	Zofingen
Old Boys	0–3	FC Alle
FC Lancy-Sports	0–3	Naters
FC Étoile-Laconnex	2–6	Chênois
FC Renens	2–3 (a.e.t.)	Signal FC (Bernex)
Herzogenbuchsee	1–3	Münsingen
Herisau	0–8	St. Gallen U-21
FC Valmont	0–3	Bex
FC Ebikon	1–4	Luzern U-21
Bazenheid	0–3	Grasshopper Club U-21
Brühl	1–2	Kreuzlingen
ASI Audax-Friul	1–7	Baulmes
Belfaux	0–2	Basel U-21
Echallens U-21	1–0	Colombier
Montreux-Sports	0–3	Meyrin
US Collombey-Muraz	0–6	Martigny-Sports
FC Epalinges	0–4	Étoile-Carouge
FC Wittenbach	2–1	FC Amriswil
FC Bodio	0–2	Mendrisio
US Verscio	0–5	Chiasso
Bavois	0–8	La Chaux-de-Fonds
SC Emmen	3–0	FC Regensdorf
Breitenrain	3–2	Grenchen
FC Kirchberg	0–4	Zürich U-21
SV Lyss	2–1	FC Ostermundigen
Monthey	0–4	Stade Nyonnais
Wettingen 93	1–5	YF Juventus
25 August 2002
Lausanne-Sport U-21	2–0	Grand-Lancy
FC Wülfingen	1–1 (a.e.t.) (4–5 p)	Frauenfeld
FC Rorschach	1–4	Gossau
Dürrenast	2–1	Wangen bei Olten
Xamax U-21	1–3	Serrières
SC Baudepartment Basel	1–5	Solothurn
Young Boys U-21	3–1	Fribourg
Düdingen	1–2 (a.e.t.)	Biel-Bienne
Muttenz	2–1	Nordstern Basel
FC Schwamendingen	0–2	Schötz
Laufen	1–2 (a.e.t.)	FC Breitenbach
Hochdorf	0–3	Aarau U-21
FC St. Margrethen	3–3 (a.e.t.) (4–3 p)	Tuggen
Cham	2–1 (a.e.t.)	Rapperswil-Jona
FC Sion U-21	2–4	FC Stade Lausanne Ouchy
Inter Club Zurigo	0–1	Biaschesi
A.P. Genève	0–5	Echallens
FC Le Locle	1–4	FC Stade Payerne
Winterthur U-21	2–1 (a.e.t.)	SV Schaffhausen
Freienbach	1–5	Chur
Lugano U-21	2–0	Locarno
FC Seefeld Zürich	2–4	Buochs
FC Eschenbach	1–0	FC Abtwil-Engelburg
FC Schmerikon	0–1	FC Hinwil
Brugg	3–0	Zug 94
FC Ascona	2–4	Malcantone Agno

== Round 3 ==
Team 1	Score	Team 2
6 September 2002
FC Echallens II	1–4	Baulmes
Étoile-Carouge	3–1 (a.e.t.)	ES Malley
7 September 2002
Schötz	2–1 (a.e.t.)	Zofingen
Lausanne-Sport U-21	0–3	Martigny-Sports
FC Courtételle	1–4	Basel U-21
Buochs	1–1 (a.e.t.) (4–3 p)	Biaschesi
Frauenfeld	1–5	Grasshopper Club U-21
FC Hinwil	0–2	Zürich U-21
Kreuzlingen	0–4	YF Juventus
Muttenz	3–1	Serrières
Mendrisio	0–2	Aarau U-21
Chur	3–1	Gossau
FC Stade Payerne	2–5	Meyrin
Chênois	3–1	Stade Lausanne Ouchy
SC Emmen	0–2	Luzern U-21
Cham	0–0 (a.e.t.) (8–7 p)	Malcantone Agno
SV Lyss	0–5	Young Boys U-21
Naters	1–0	Servette U-21
8 September 2002
FC St. Margrethen	2–1 (a.e.t.)	FC Wittenbach
Bex	0–2	Echallens
Dürrenast	2–0	Bulle
FC Breitenbach	2–2 (a.e.t.) (7–6 p)	Biel-Bienne
Lugano U-21	1–3	Chiasso
Winterthur U-21	1–3	FC Altstetten (Zürich)
FC Eschenbach	0–5	St. Gallen U-21
Signal FC (Bernex)	0–0 (a.e.t.) (2–4 p)	Stade Nyonnais
Brugg	2–5	Solothurn
FC Alle	0–6	Münsingen
2 October 2002
Breitenrain	2–4	La Chaux-de-Fonds

== Round 4 ==
Eleven teams from the 2002–03 Nationalliga B (NLB) were granted byes for the first three rounds and they joined the competition in the fourth round. Second-tier club Vaduz who competed their league season in the NLB, however, played only in the Liechtenstein Cup and not here in the Swiss Cup. These eleven teams were seeded and cound not be drawn against each other. The draw respected regionalities, when possible, and the lower classed team was granted home advantage.

Team 1	Score	Team 2
9 October 2002
Buochs	4–3	Luzern U-21
10 October 2002
Étoile-Carouge	1–2	Yverdon-Sport
11 October 2002
Chênois	3–0	Stade Nyonnais
12 October 2002
La Chaux-de-Fonds	1–1 (a.e.t.) (5–3 p)	Baulmes
Basel U-21	3–0	Lausanne-Sport
YF Juventus	3–3 (a.e.t.) (8–9 p)	Baden
Zürich U-21	2–2 (a.e.t.) (2–0 p)	Winterthur
Chur	3–2 (a.e.t.)	Wohlen
Schötz	0–2	FC Schaffhausen
Chiasso	5–1	St. Gallen U-21
13 October 2002
Muttenz	0–1	Concordia Basel
Martigny-Sports	0–1	Sion
Dürrenast	0–3	Naters
Solothurn	0–0 (a.e.t.) (5–4 p)	Echallens
FC Breitenbach	0–5	Young Boys U-21
Münsingen	1–1 (a.e.t.) (4–3 p)	Meyrin
Cham	1–3	Kriens
FC St. Margrethen	1–3 (a.e.t.)	Bellinzona
23 October 2002
FC Altstetten (Zürich)	0–4	Lugano
Aarau U-21	0–2	Grasshopper Club U-21

== Round 5 ==
The twelve first-tier clubs from the 2002–03 Nationalliga A had been granted byes for the first four rounds and they joined the competition in this round. The first-tier teams were seeded and cound not be drawn against each other. The draw respected regionalities, when possible, and the lower classed team was granted home advantage.

=== Summary ===
Team 1	Score	Team 2
9 November 2002
Young Boys U-21	0–2	Delémont
Zürich U-21	0–2	Luzern
Basel U-21	0–2	Neuchâtel Xamax
Bellinzona	1–6	Grasshopper Club
10 November 2002
Grasshopper Club U-21	2–3	Kriens
Chiasso	1–3	Lugano
Naters	3–1	Münsingen
Concordia Basel	0–4	Servette
Solothurn	1–2	Young Boys
FC Schaffhausen	2–1	Zürich
Chur	0–2	St. Gallen
Baden	2–0	Aarau
Buochs	0–0 (a.e.t.) (1–3 p)	Wil
Chênois	0–1	Thun
4 December 2002
La Chaux-de-Fonds	1–0	Sion
22 February 2003
Yverdon-Sport	0–3	Basel

=== Matches ===
9 November 2002
17:30

Bellinzona	1–6	Grasshopper Club
Morocutti 45' (1:2)	RSSSF summary	4' (0:1) Barijho; 41' (0:2) Barijho; 57' (1:3) Nuñez; 81' (1:4) Barijho; 86' (1:5) Barijho; 90+2' (1:6) Nuñez

Stadio Comunale, Bellinzona

10 November 2002
14:30

Concordia Basel	0–4	Servette
	Servette summary	22' (0:1) Thurre; 31' (pen.) Obradovic; 54' (0:3) Thurre; 77' (0:4) Thurre

Sports facilities St. Jakob, Münchenstein
Attendance: 543
Referee: (Switzerland) Nicole Petignat (Courgenay)

10 November 2002
14:30

Solothurn	1–2	Young Boys
Riedwyl 10' (1:1); Riedwyl (yellow card) 40'; Müller (yellow card) 50'; Nicolo (yellow card) 84'	YB summary	9' (0:1) Rochat; 35' (1:2) Chapuisat; (yellow card) 61' Disler; (yellow card) 67' Tikva

Stadion FC Solothurn, Solothurn
Attendance: 3,400
Referee: (Switzerland) Claudio Circhetta (Muttenz)

10 November 2002
14:30

FC Schaffhausen	2–1	Zürich
Toco 27' (1:0); Toco 55' (2:0)	FCZ summary	66' (2:1) Yasar

Stadion Breite, Schaffhausen
Attendance: 1,800
Referee: (Switzerland) Reto Rutz (Amriswil)

10 November 2002
14:30

Baden	2–0	Aarau
Blunschi 27' (1:0); Menezes 76' (2:0)	FCA summary

Esp Stadium, Fislisbach
Attendance: 2,405
Referee: (Switzerland) Martin Salm (Veltheim, Aargau)

22 February 2003
16:00

Yverdon-Sport	0–3	Basel
Gil (yellow card) 20'; Gilardi (yellow card) 80'	FCB summary	16' (0:1) Cantaluppi; (yellow card) 18' Haas; 40' (0:2) Cantaluppi; (red card) 41' Rossi; 89' (0:3) Atouba

Stade Municipal, Yverdon-les-Bains
Attendance: 2,800
Referee: (Switzerland) Reto Rutz (Amriswil)

== Round 6 ==
=== Summary ===
Team 1	Score	Team 2
23 February 2003
Naters	0–4	St. Gallen
Baden	0–2	Luzern
Kriens	1–2 (a.e.t.)	Wil
Lugano	0–2	Grasshopper Club
Young Boys	1–0	Delémont
FC Schaffhausen	3–1 (a.e.t.)	Thun
La Chaux-de-Fonds	0–2	Neuchâtel Xamax
4 March 2003
Basel	2–0	Servette

=== Matches ===
23 February 2003
14:30

Lugano	0–2	Grasshopper Club
Brunner (yellow card) 76'	RSSSF summary	38' (0:1) Eduardo; (yellow card) 36' (yellow-red card) 45' Lichtsteiner; 60' (0:2) Eduardo; (yellow card) 64' Gerber

Cornaredo, Lugano
Attendance: 1,970
Referee: (Switzerland) Markus Nobs (Wohlen bei Bern)

23 February 2003
14:30

Young Boys	1–0	Delémont
Häberli 24' (1:0); Eugster (yellow card) 55'; Descloux (yellow card) 84'	YB summary	(yellow card) 13' Vernier; (yellow card) 29' Shereni; (yellow card) 45' Patrick; (yellow card) 50' Bui; (yellow card) 55' Reimann; (yellow card) 89' Hushi

Stadion Neufeld, Bern
Attendance: 3,500
Referee: (Liechtenstein) Roland Beck (Triesenberg)

4 March 2003
19:30

Basel	2–0	Servette
Barberis (yellow card) 28'; Cantaluppi 35' (pen. 1:0); Chipperfield 51' (2:0)	FCB summary	(yellow card) 39' Comisetti; (yellow card) 68' Lombardo; (yellow card) 75' Bratić; (yellow card) 85' Kader

St. Jakob-Park, Basel
Attendance: 10,721
Referee: (Switzerland) Guido Wildhaber (Kerzers)

== Quarter-finals ==
=== Summary ===
Team 1	Score	Team 2
26 March 2003
Wil	0–2	Xamax
Luzern	1–2	Grasshopper Club
Young Boys	3–4 (a.e.t.)	Basel
30 March 2003
FC Schaffhausen	1–0	St. Gallen

=== Matches ===
26 March 2003
19:00

Wil	0–2	Xamax
	RSSSF summary	10' (0:1) Rey; 90+1' Leandro

Stadion Bergholz, Wil
Attendance: 1,681
Referee: (Switzerland) René Rogalla (Wallisellen)

26 March 2003
19:30

Luzern	1–2	Grasshopper Club
Muff 64' (1:1)	RSSSF summary	26' (0:1) Rozental; 81' (1:1) Petric

Stadion Allmend, Luzern
Attendance: 6,129
Referee: (Switzerland) Guido Wildhaber (Kerzers)

26 March 2003
19:30

Young Boys	3–4 (a.e.t.)	Basel
Petrosyan (yellow card) 16'; Häberli (yellow card) 27'; Sermeter 39' (1:2); Sermeter 42' (pen. 2:2); Sermeter 55' (3:2); Patrick (yellow card) 88'; Sermeter (yellow card) 120'	YB summary FCB summary	2' (0:1) Giménez; (yellow card) 19' Duruz; 28' (0:2) Giménez; (yellow card) 36' Tum; (yellow card) 41' (yellow-red card) 44' Varela; (yellow card) 57' H. Yakin; (yellow card) 59' Haas; 65' (3:3) Tum; (yellow card) 95' M. Yakin; 108' (3:4) H. Yakin

Stadion Neufeld, Bern
Attendance: 10,700 (sold out)
Referee: (Switzerland) Carlo Bertolini (Vira-Gambarogno)

30 March 2003
15:00

FC Schaffhausen	1–0	St. Gallen
Todisco 68' (1:0); Todisco (yellow card); Pesenti (yellow card); Rohrer (yellow card)	RSSSF summary	(yellow card) Imhof; (yellow card) Müller; (yellow card) Jenny

Stadion Breite, Schaffhausen
Attendance: 3,743
Referee: (Switzerland) Martin Salm (Veltheim, Aargau)

== Semi-finals ==
The four winners of the quarter-finals played in the semi-finals. The winners of the first drawn semi-final is considered as home team in the final.

=== Summary ===
Team 1	Score	Team 2
15 April 2003
Basel	3–0	FC Schaffhausen
Xamax	2–2(a.e.t.) (9–8 p)	Grasshopper Club

=== Matches ===
15 April 2003
20:15
First semi-final

Basel	3–0	FC Schaffhausen
Esposito 26' (1–0); Chipperfield (yellow card) 65'; Esposito (yellow card) 72'; Tum 90' (2–0); Esposito 90+2' (3–0)	FCB summary	(yellow card) 18' Leu; (yellow card) 23' Fehr

St. Jakob-Park, Basel
Attendance: 26,960
Referee: (Switzerland) Reto Rutz (Amriswil)

16 April 2003
Second semi-final

Xamax	2–2 (a.e.t.)	Grasshopper Club
Rey 52' (1–2); Rey 65' (2–2)	SFV summary	1' (0–1) Baturina; 45' (0–2) Petrić
Penalties
D'Amico (penalty scored); Barea (penalty scored); Sanou (penalty scored); Leandro (penalty scored); Simo (penalty scored); Portillo (penalty scored); Oppliger (penalty scored); Buess (penalty scored); M'Futi (penalty scored)	9–8	(penalty scored) Gamboa; (penalty scored) Cabanas; (penalty scored) Schwegler; (penalty scored) Núñez; (penalty scored) Baturina; (penalty scored) Eduardo dos Santos; (penalty scored) Castillo; (penalty scored) Digenti; (penalty missed) Spycher

Stade de la Maladière, Neuchâtel
Attendance: 7,600
Referee: (Switzerland) Dieter Schoch (Attiswil)

== Final ==
The final was played in the St. Jakob-Park on Sunday 11 May 2003.

=== Summary ===
Team 1	Score	Team 2
11 May 2003
Basel	6–0	Xamax

=== Telegram ===
11 May 2003
15:00

Basel	6–0	Xamax
Huggel 13' (1–0); Giménez 35' (2–0); Giménez 43' (3–0); M. Yakin 65' (4–0); Smiljanić 77' (5–0); Barberis 83' (6–0)	Fussball-Schweiz summary FCB summary	(yellow card) 57' Leandro; (yellow card) 87' Buess

St. Jakob-Park, Basel
Attendance: 31,500 (sold out)
Referee: (Switzerland) René Rogalla (Wallisellen)

Basel won the cup and this was the club's seventh cup title to this date and their second consecutive cup title.

== Further in Swiss football ==
- 2002-03 Nationalliga A
- 2002-03 Nationalliga B
- 2002-03 Swiss 1. Liga

== Sources and external links ==
- Official site (in German)
- Cup finals at Fussball-Schweiz
- Switzerland 2002/03 at RSSSF
- Josef Zindel (2018). FC Basel 1893. Die ersten 125 Jahre (in German). Basel: Friedrich Reinhardt Verlag. ISBN 978-3-7245-2305-5.
