= 2001–02 in Swiss football =

Football in Switzerland
- Season: 2001–02

Men's football
- Nationalliga A: Basel
- Nationalliga B: Wil
- 1. Liga: Group 1: Colombier; Group 2: FC Schaffhausen; Group 3: Malcantone; Overall 1. Liga champion Wohlen
- Swiss Cup: Basel

Women's football
- Swiss Women's Super League: FC Sursee
- Swiss Cup: FC Sursee

The following is a summary of the 2001–02 season of competitive football in Switzerland.

== Nationalliga A ==
=== Qualification phase ===
Pos	Team	Pld	W	D	L	GF	GA	GD	Pts	Qualification
1	Basel	22	13	4	5	52	37	+15	43	Advance to championship round halved points (rounded up) as bonus
2	Lugano	22	11	5	6	39	33	+6	38	Advance to championship round halved points (rounded up) as bonus
3	Grasshopper Club	22	11	4	7	50	33	+17	37	Advance to championship round halved points (rounded up) as bonus
4	St. Gallen	22	9	8	5	38	32	+6	35	Advance to championship round halved points (rounded up) as bonus
5	Servette	22	9	7	6	36	29	+7	34	Advance to championship round halved points (rounded up) as bonus
6	Sion	22	10	3	9	40	29	+11	33	Advance to championship round halved points (rounded up) as bonus
7	Young Boys	22	8	7	7	35	28	+7	31	Advance to championship round halved points (rounded up) as bonus
8	Zürich	22	7	9	6	24	27	−3	30	Advance to championship round halved points (rounded up) as bonus
9	Aarau	22	7	6	9	28	25	+3	27	Continue to promotion/relegation round
10	Neuchâtel Xamax	22	6	7	9	28	36	−8	25	Continue to promotion/relegation round
11	Lausanne-Sport	22	4	4	14	24	49	−25	16	Continue to promotion/relegation round
12	Luzern	22	3	4	15	23	59	−36	13	Continue to promotion/relegation round

Source: RSSSF

=== Championship playoff round ===
The first eight teams of the regular season (or Qualification) competed in the Championship Playoff Round. They took half of the points (rounded up to complete units) gained in the Qualification as Bonus with them.

Pos	Team	Pld	W	D	L	GF	GA	GD	BP	Pts	Qualification or relegation
1	Basel (C)	14	11	0	3	36	16	+20	22	55	Qualification to Champions League third qualifying round
2	Grasshopper Club	14	7	5	2	28	17	+11	19	45	Qualification to UEFA Cup first round
3	Lugano (Note: Both Lugano and Sion did not obtain a top level license for the 2002/03 season. Neither did Lausanne; all three clubs are relegated to the NLB and their NLA places filled by Aarau, Delémont and Luzern.) (R)	14	7	2	5	23	19	+4	19	42	Qualification to UEFA Cup qualifying round
4	Servette	14	6	3	5	25	23	+2	17	38	Qualification to UEFA Cup qualifying round
5	Zürich	14	6	2	6	14	17	−3	15	35	Qualification to Intertoto Cup first round
6	St. Gallen	14	4	4	6	18	20	−2	18	34	Qualification to Intertoto Cup first round
7	Young Boys	14	4	3	7	18	25	−7	16	31	
8	Sion (R)	14	1	1	12	10	35	−25	17	21	

Source: RSSSF
(C) Champions; (R) Relegated

== Nationalliga B ==
=== Qualification phase ===
Pos	Team	Pld	W	D	L	GF	GA	GD	Pts	Qualification
1	Wil	22	12	5	5	53	32	+21	41	Advance to promotion/relegation NLA/LNB round
2	Winterthur	22	12	3	7	48	48	0	39	Advance to promotion/relegation NLA/LNB round
3	Thun	22	11	5	6	42	32	+10	38	Advance to promotion/relegation NLA/LNB round
4	Delémont	22	11	5	6	33	26	+7	38	Advance to promotion/relegation NLA/LNB round
5	Yverdon-Sport	22	10	5	7	37	31	+6	35	Continue to relegation round NLB/1. Liga halved points (rounded up) as bonus
6	Étoile Carouge	22	8	7	7	27	26	+1	31	Continue to relegation round NLB/1. Liga halved points (rounded up) as bonus
7	Kriens	22	9	3	10	28	30	−2	30	Continue to relegation round NLB/1. Liga halved points (rounded up) as bonus
8	Bellinzona	22	7	4	11	26	33	−7	25	Continue to relegation round NLB/1. Liga halved points (rounded up) as bonus
9	Baden	22	5	9	8	40	37	+3	24	Continue to relegation round NLB/1. Liga halved points (rounded up) as bonus
10	Locarno	22	6	5	11	28	34	−6	23	Continue to relegation round NLB/1. Liga halved points (rounded up) as bonus
11	Vaduz	22	5	7	10	34	43	−9	22	Continue to relegation round NLB/1. Liga halved points (rounded up) as bonus
12	Concordia Basel	22	5	4	13	34	58	−24	19	Continue to relegation round NLB/1. Liga halved points (rounded up) as bonus

Source: RSSSF
Rules for classification: 1) points; 2) goal difference; 3) number of goals scored.

=== Promotion/relegation group NLA/NLB ===
Pos	Team	Pld	W	D	L	GF	GA	GD	Pts	Qualification
1	Xamax	14	8	4	2	26	12	+14	28	Remain in NLA
2	Lausanne-Sport (Note: Lausanne did not obtain a top level license for the 2002/03 season, neither did Lugano and Sion; these three clubs were relegated to the NLB and their NLA places filled by Aarau, Delémont and Luzern.)	14	8	2	4	21	14	+7	26	Did not obtain licence for top level
3	Wil	14	6	5	3	17	13	+4	23	Promoted to NLA
4	Thun	14	6	3	5	19	18	+1	21	Promoted to NLA
5	Aarau	14	6	3	5	20	20	0	21	Relegated, but remained in NLA via green table
6	Delémont	14	4	4	6	14	20	−6	16	Promoted on green table
7	Luzern	14	2	5	7	26	28	−2	11	Relegated, but remained in NLA via green table
8	Winterthur	14	1	4	9	11	29	−18	7	Remain in NLB

Source: RSSSF
Rules for classification: 1) points; 2) goal difference; 3) number of goals scored.

=== Relegation group NLB/1. Liga ===
Pos	Team	Pld	W	D	L	GF	GA	GD	BP	Pts	Qualification
1	Yverdon-Sport	14	8	1	5	30	26	+4	18	43	Remain in LNB
2	Vaduz	14	8	3	3	28	18	+10	11	38	Remain in LNB
3	Bellinzona	14	7	3	4	22	18	+4	13	37	Remain in LNB
4	Kriens	14	7	0	7	31	24	+7	15	36	Remain in LNB
5	Concordia Basel	14	6	4	4	23	20	+3	15	37	Remain in LNB
6	Baden	14	5	2	7	15	21	−6	12	29	Remain in LNB
7	Locarno	14	4	5	5	17	19	−2	12	29	Relegated to 1. Liga
8	Étoile Carouge	14	1	2	11	10	30	−20	16	21	Relegated to 1. Liga

Source: RSSSF
Rules for classification: 1) points; 2) Position in the qualification

== 1. Liga ==
=== Group 1 ===
Pos	Team	Pld	W	D	L	GF	GA	GD	Pts	Qualification or relegation
1	FC Colombier	30	17	7	6	49	37	+12	58	Play-off to Challenge League
2	FC Serrières	30	15	8	7	45	32	+13	53	Play-off to Challenge League
3	CS Chênois	30	15	7	8	56	38	+18	52	
4	FC Baulmes	30	15	4	11	66	53	+13	49	
5	FC Echallens	30	13	6	11	48	36	+12	45	
6	FC Naters	30	12	9	9	59	48	+11	45	
7	FC La Chaux-de-Fonds	30	12	6	12	50	47	+3	42	
8	FC Stade Lausanne Ouchy	30	11	9	10	42	43	−1	42	
9	FC Meyrin	30	12	5	13	51	52	−1	41	
10	FC Bex	30	9	10	11	39	43	−4	37	
11	Vevey Sports	30	10	7	13	43	53	−10	37	
12	Grand-Lancy FC	30	9	8	13	46	49	−3	35	
13	FC Stade Nyonnais	30	9	8	13	43	51	−8	35	
14	Servette U-21	30	9	8	13	41	56	−15	35	
15	Lausanne-Sport U-21	30	10	4	16	44	65	−21	34	Relegation to 2. Liga Interregional
16	Sion U-21	30	7	4	19	32	51	−19	25	Relegation to 2. Liga Interregional

Source: Erste Liga official website
Rules for classification: 1) Points; 2) Goal difference within the league or play-off for qualifiers.

=== Group 2 ===
Pos	Team	Pld	W	D	L	GF	GA	GD	Pts	Qualification or relegation
1	FC Schaffhausen	30	19	8	3	52	23	+29	65	Play-off to Challenge League
2	FC Solothurn	30	16	8	6	60	34	+26	56	Decider for play-off
3	SC Young Fellows Juventus	30	16	8	6	65	46	+19	56	Decider winners, play-off to Challenge League
4	Grasshopper Club U-21	30	14	7	9	62	53	+9	49	
5	Basel U-21	30	14	6	10	67	46	+21	48	
6	FC Biel-Bienne	30	12	8	10	47	43	+4	44	
7	Zürich U-21	30	12	8	10	45	46	−1	44	
8	FC Grenchen	30	11	8	11	52	43	+9	41	
9	FC Altstetten	30	9	10	11	35	40	−5	37	
10	FC Wangen bei Olten	30	8	11	11	56	54	+2	35	
11	SV Schaffhausen	30	9	8	13	34	45	−11	35	
12	FC Bulle	30	9	8	13	37	52	−15	35	
13	FC Münsingen	30	9	8	13	35	51	−16	35	
14	FC Fribourg	30	9	7	14	43	47	−4	34	
15	FC Red Star Zürich	30	8	6	16	32	52	−20	30	Relegation to 2. Liga Interregional
16	FC Schwamendingen	30	4	3	23	24	71	−47	15	Relegation to 2. Liga Interregional

Source: Erste Liga official website
Rules for classification: 1) Points; 2) Goal difference within the league or play-off for qualifiers.

==== Decider to play-off ====
The two teams Solothurn and Young Fellows Juventus ended the season level on points and so they had to play a decision match to resolve second position and the play-off slot. This match was played on May 21, 2002, in Sursee.

Team 1	Score	Team 2
Solothurn	1–3	YFJ

SC Young Fellows Juventus win and advance, as group runner-up, to play-offs.

=== Group 3 ===
Pos	Team	Pld	W	D	L	GF	GA	GD	Pts	Qualification or relegation
1	FC Malcantone Agno	30	19	6	5	63	33	+30	63	Play-off to Challenge League
2	FC Wohlen	30	18	8	4	61	28	+33	62	Play-off to Challenge League
3	FC Tuggen	30	17	9	4	58	24	+34	60	
4	SC Buochs	30	15	7	8	35	29	+6	52	
5	St. Gallen U-21	30	10	13	7	38	34	+4	43	
6	FC Chiasso	30	11	9	10	39	28	+11	42	
7	FC Chur 97	30	12	6	12	58	56	+2	42	
8	FC Mendrisio	30	12	5	13	34	38	−4	41	
9	FC Schötz	30	9	10	11	44	52	−8	37	
10	Luzern U-21	30	9	8	13	42	46	−4	35	
11	FC Gossau	30	8	11	11	39	48	−9	35	
12	FC Kreuzlingen	30	10	5	15	34	50	−16	35	
13	Zug 94	30	9	7	14	35	38	−3	34	
14	FC Rapperswil-Jona	30	7	9	14	43	45	−2	30	
15	FC Freienbach	30	6	5	19	38	71	−33	23	Relegation to 2. Liga Interregional
16	FC Rorschach	30	5	8	17	31	72	−41	23	Relegation to 2. Liga Interregional

Source: Erste Liga official website
Rules for classification: 1) Points; 2) Goal difference within the league or play-off for qualifiers.

=== Promotion play-off ===
The three group winners and the three runners-up contested this play-off for the two promotion slots. The U-21 teams were not eligible for this stage.

Qualification round

Team 1	Score	Team 2
Wohlen	4–1	Colombier
Colombier	2–2	Wohlen

Wohlen win 6–3 on aggregate and continue to the finals.

Team 1	Score	Team 2
YFJ	1–0	Malcantone
Malcantone	3–2	YFJ

3–3 on aggregate, Young Fellows Juventus win on away goals and continue to the finals.

Team 1	Score	Team 2
Serrières	1–4	Schaffhausen
Schaffhausen	1–0	Serrières

Schaffhausen win 5–1 on aggregate and continue to the finals.

Final round

Team 1	Score	Team 2
YFJ	1–2	Wohlen
Wohlen	0–0	Schaffhausen
Schaffhausen	1–1	YFJ

==== Final table ====
Pos	Team	Pld	W	D	L	GF	GA	GD	Pts	Qualification or relegation
1	Wohlen	2	1	1	0	2	1	+1	4	Promotion to Challenge League
2	Schaffhausen	2	0	2	0	1	1	0	2	Promotion to Challenge League
3	Young Fellows Juventus	2	0	1	1	2	3	−1	1	

Source: Erste Liga official website
Rules for classification: 1) Points; 2) Play-off

== Swiss Cup ==
The four winners of the quarter-finals played in the semi-finals. The winners of the first drawn semi-final is considered as home team in the final.

Semi-finals

11 April 2002
First semi-final

Lausanne-Sport	1–4	Grasshopper Club
Meyer 51' (pen.)	Report	6' Petrić; 22' (pen.) Núñez; 87' Baturina; 90' Eduardo

Olympique de la Pontaise, Lausanne
Attendance: 2,880
Referee: (Switzerland) Roland Beck, (Triesen)

11 April 2002
20:15
Second semi-final

Basel	1–1 (a.e.t.)	Young Boys
Varela (yellow card) 13'; Giménez 23' (1:0); Yao (yellow card) 58'; Cravero (red card) 69'; Atouba (yellow card) 90'; Koumantarakis (yellow card) 114'	Report	51' (1:1) Joel Descloux; (red card) 73' Collaviti; (yellow card) 77' Tikva
Penalties
M. Yakin (penalty scored); Zwyssig (penalty scored); Giménez (penalty scored); Koumantarakis (penalty missed); Zuberbühler (penalty missed); Chipperfield (penalty scored)	4–3	(penalty scored) Hänzi; (penalty missed) Tikva; (penalty scored) Joel Descloux; (penalty missed) Petrosyan; (penalty scored) Burri; (penalty missed) Berisha

St. Jakob-Park, Basel
Attendance: 25,381
Referee: (Switzerland) Massimo Busacca, (Monte Carasso)

Final

12 May 2002
16:00

Grasshopper Club	1–2 (a.e.t.)	FC Basel
Petrić 38', (yellow card) 91'; Schwegler (yellow card) 28'; Castillo (yellow card) 78'; Cabanas (yellow card) 82'; Smiljanić (yellow card) 42' (yellow-red card) 112'	Report	5' Tum; (yellow card) 43', (goal) 113' (pen.) M. Yakin; (yellow card) 114' Barberis

St. Jakob-Park, Basel
Attendance: 30,000 (sold out)
Referee: (Switzerland) Philippe Leuba (Chexbres)

== Swiss Clubs in Europe ==
- Grasshopper Club as 2000–01 Nationalliga A champions: Champions League third qualifying round
- Lugano as runners-up: Champions League second qualifying round
- St. Gallen as third placed team: UEFA Cup qualifying round
- Servette as 2000–01 Swiss Cup winners: UEFA Cup first round
- Basel: UEFA Cup first round
- Lausanne-Sport: UEFA Cup first round
- FC Vaduz as 2000–01 Liechtenstein Cup winners: UEFA Cup qualifying round

=== Grasshopper Club ===
==== Champions League ====
===== Third qualifying round =====
8 August 2001 First leg	Porto (Portugal)	2–2	(Switzerland) Grasshopper Club	Estádio das Antas, Porto
22:00 CET	Paredes 6'; Postiga 59'	Report	Núñez 50'; Petrić 57'	Attendance: 46,142; Referee: Ľuboš Micheľ (Slovakia)

22 August 2001 Second leg	Grasshopper Club (Switzerland)	2–3	(Portugal) Porto	Hardturm, Zürich
20:15 CET	Petrić 78'; Chapuisat 87'	Report	Clayton 14'; Capucho 43'; Deco 80'	Attendance: 16,066; Referee: Stuart Dougal (Scotland)

Porto won 5–4 on aggregate.

==== UEFA Cup ====
===== First round =====
20 September 2001 First leg	Dinamo București (Romania)	1–3	(Switzerland) Grasshopper Club	Stadionul Dinamo, Bucharest
16:00	Mihalcea 85' (pen.)	Report	Chapuisat 28'; Benjamin 81'; Núñez 87'	Attendance: 5,000; Referee: Dani Koren (Israel)

27 September 2001 First leg	Grasshopper Club (Switzerland)	3–1	(Romania) Dinamo București	Hardturm Stadium, Zürich
19:00	Baturina 18'; Chapuisat 21'; Morales 87'	Report	Mihalcea 52' (pen.)	Attendance: 3,100; Referee: Miroslav Liba (Czech Republic)

Grasshoppers won 6–2 on aggregate.

===== Second round =====
18 October 2001 First leg	Grasshopper Club (Switzerland)	4–1	(Netherlands) Twente	Hardturm, Zürich
19:15	Núñez 29', 34', 90'; Petrić 57'	Report	Polak 69'	Attendance: 5,500; Referee: Georgios Kasnaferis (Greece)

1 November 2001 Second leg	Twente (Netherlands)	3–2	(Switzerland) Grasshopper Club	De Grolsch Veste, Enschede
18:30	van der Laan 35', 79'; Cairo 45'	Report	Chapuisat 70'; Benjani 85'	Attendance: 6,500; Referee: Attila Hanacsek (Hungary)

Grasshoppers won 6–4 on aggregate.

===== Third round =====
22 November 2001 First leg	Grasshopper Club (Switzerland)	1–2	(England) Leeds United	Hardturm, Zürich
20:15	Chapuisat 17'	Report	Harte 73'; Smith 78'	Attendance: 15,000; Referee: Lucílio Batista (Portugal)

6 December 2001 Second leg	Leeds United (England)	2–2	(Switzerland) Grasshopper Club	Elland Road, Leeds
21:00	Kewell 19'; Keane 45'	Report	Núñez 42', 89'	Attendance: 40,014; Referee: Frank De Bleeckere (Belgium)

Leeds United won 4–3 on aggregate.

=== Lugano ===
==== Champions League ====
===== Second qualifying round =====
25 July 2001 First leg	Shakhtar Donetsk (Ukraine)	3–0	(Switzerland) Lugano	Shakhtar Stadium, Donetsk
18:00 CET	Bakharev 21'; Tymoshchuk 57'; Vorobey 65'	Report		Attendance: 31,714; Referee: Roy Helge Olsen (Norway)

31 July 2001 Second leg	Lugano (Switzerland)	2–1	(Ukraine) Shakhtar Donetsk	Cornaredo Stadium, Lugano
20:15 CET	Gaspoz 53'; Rossi 66'	Report	Aghahowa 13'	Attendance: 3,300; Referee: Juan Ansuátegui Roca (Spain)

Shakhtar Donetsk won 4–2 on aggregate.

=== St. Gallen ===
==== UEFA Cup ====
===== Qualifying round =====
9 August 2001 First leg	Pelister (North Macedonia)	0–2	(Switzerland) St. Gallen	Stadion Tumbe Kafe, Bitola
17:30		Report	Guido 4'; Dal Santo 89'	Attendance: 1,664; Referee: Johan Verbist (Belgium)

23 August 2001 Second leg	St. Gallen (Switzerland)	2–3	(North Macedonia) Pelister	Letzigrund, Zürich
20:00	Gane 57', 61'	Report	Talevski 65'; Deliovski 72'; Elmazovski 74'	Attendance: 3,555; Referee: Tonny Poulsen (Denmark)

3–3 on aggregate. St. Gallen won on away goals.

===== First round =====
20 September 2001 First leg	St. Gallen (Switzerland)	2–1	(Romania) Steaua București	Hardturm Stadium, Zürich
20:00	Batista 33'; Mokoena 53'	Report	Neaga 37'	Attendance: 4,000; Referee: Gylfi Orrason (Iceland)

27 September 2001 Second leg	Steaua București (Romania)	1–1	(Switzerland) St. Gallen	Stadionul Steaua, Bucharest
20:00	Răducanu 12'	Report	Guido 59'	Attendance: 7,209; Referee: Edo Trivković (Croatia)

St. Gallen won 3–2 on aggregate.

===== Second round =====
18 October 2001 First leg	Freiburg (Germany)	0–1	(Switzerland) St. Gallen	Dreisamstadion, Freiburg
20:30		Report	Mokoena 90'	Attendance: 18,000; Referee: Vladimír Hriňák (Slovakia)

1 November 2001 Second leg	St. Gallen (Switzerland)	1–4	(Germany) Freiburg	Hardturm, Zürich
16:00	Zellweger 8'	Report	Tskitishvili 11'; Sellimi 37'; But 73'; Kehl 82'	Attendance: 16,066; Referee: Michal Beneš (Czech Republic)

Freiburg won 4–2 on aggregate.

=== Servette ===
==== UEFA Cup ====
===== First round =====
20 September 2001 First leg	Servette (Switzerland)	1–0	(Czech Republic) Slavia Prague	Charmilles Stadium, Geneva
20:15	Oruma 75'	Report		Attendance: 4,286; Referee: Georgios Douros (Greece)

27 September 2001 Second leg	Slavia Prague (Czech Republic)	1–1	(Switzerland) Servette	Stadion Evžena Rošického, Prague
20:15	Petrouš 89'	Report	Oruma 13'	Attendance: 4,698; Referee: Yuri Baskakov (Russia)

Servette won 2–1 on aggregate.

===== Second round =====
18 October 2001 First leg	Zaragoza (Spain)	0–0	(Switzerland) Servette	La Romareda, Zaragoza
21:00		Report		Attendance: 16,500; Referee: Lutz Michael Fröhlich (Germany)

1 November 2001 Second leg	Servette (Switzerland)	1–0	(Spain) Real Zaragoza	Charmilles Stadium, Geneva
20:30	Oruma 87'	Report		Attendance: 8,274; Referee: Orhan Erdemir (Turkey)

Servette won 1–0 on aggregate.

===== Third round =====
22 November 2001 First leg	Servette (Switzerland)	0–0	(Germany) Hertha BSC	Charmilles Stadium, Geneva
18:00		Report		Attendance: 8,412; Referee: Claus Bo Larsen (Denmark)

6 December 2001 Second leg	Hertha BSC (Germany)	0–3	(Switzerland) Servette	Friedrich-Ludwig-Jahn-Sportpark, Berlin
18:00		Report	Hilton 16'; Frei 48'; Obradović 69'	Attendance: 10,900; Referee: Graham Barber (England)

Servette won 3–0 on aggregate.

===== Fourth round =====
19 February 2002 First leg	Valencia (Spain)	3–0	(Switzerland) Servette	Mestalla Stadium, Valencia
18:00	Hilton 3' (o.g.); Aimar 48'; Ballesta 58'	Report		Attendance: 23,000; Referee: Konrad Plautz (Austria)

28 February 2002 Second leg	Servette (Switzerland)	2–2	(Spain) Valencia	Charmilles Stadium, Geneva
20:15	Robert 37'; Frei 67'	Report	Sánchez 12'; Angulo 45'	Attendance: 9,018; Referee: Valentin Ivanov (Russia)

Valencia won 5–2 on aggregate.

=== Basel ===
==== Intertoto Cup ====
===== Second round =====
1 July 2001 First leg	Basel (Switzerland)	3 – 0	(Iceland) Grindavík	St. Jakob-Park, Basel
15:00	Magro 4'; Tchouga 18'; Tum 60'; Magro (yellow card) 90+2'	Report		Attendance: 6,843; Referee: Yuri Klyuchnikov (Russia)

8 July 2001 Second leg	Grindavík (Iceland)	0 – 2	(Switzerland) Basel	Grindavíkurvöllur, Grindavík
16:00	Kekic (yellow card) 56'; Floventtson (yellow card) 75'	Report	14' (0:1) Muff; (yellow card) 42' Aziawonou; 80' (0:2) Muff	Attendance: 700; Referee: Zbigniew Marczyk (Poland)

Basel won 5–0 on aggregate.

===== Third round =====
14 July 2001 First leg	Basel (Switzerland)	2 – 1	(Netherlands) Heerenveen	St. Jakob-Park, Basel
19:30	Koumantarakis 12' (1:0); H. Yakin 20' (2:0); Cravero (yellow card) 33'	Report	(yellow card) 21' van Gessel; (yellow card) 24' Lurling; 56' (2:1) Nurmela; (yellow card) 68' Hansma; (yellow card) 68' Vonk	Attendance: 8,059; Referee: José Mendes Pratas (Portugal)

21 July 2001 Second leg	Heerenveen (Netherlands)	2 – 3	(Switzerland) Basel	Abe Lenstra Stadion, Heerenveen
19:30	Allbäck 4' (1:0); Jensen (yellow card) 37'; Venena (yellow card) 54'; Lurling 75' (2:3)	Report	10' (1:1) Koumantarakis; 24' (1:2) H. Yakin; (yellow card) 32' Kreuzer; (yellow card) 64' Zuberbühler; 69' (1:3) Tum	Attendance: 13,300; Referee: Stéphane Moulin (France)

Basel won 5–3 on aggregate.

===== Semi-final =====
25 July 2001 First leg	Basel (Switzerland)	3 – 0	(Switzerland) Lausanne	St. Jakob-Park, Basel
19:30	Giménez 19' (1:0); Giménez 21' (2:0); M. Yakin (yellow card) 42'; H. Yakin 45' (3:0)	Report	(yellow card) 42' Margairaz	Attendance: 14,872; Referee: Ferenc Bede (Hungary)

1 August 2001 Second leg	Lausanne-Sport (Switzerland)	2 – 2	(Switzerland) Basel	Stade Olympique de la Pontaise, Lausanne
16:30	Thiaw 8' (1:0); Thiaw 45' (2:1); Thiaw (yellow card) 51' (red card) 54'	Report	18' (1:1) Tum; 62' (2:2) Varela	Attendance: 2,050; Referee: Vasily Melnichuk (Ukraine)

Basel won 5–2 on aggregate.

===== Final =====
7 August 2001 First leg	Basel (Switzerland)	1 – 1	(England) Aston Villa	St. Jakob-Park, Basel
19:30	Giménez 74' (1:1)	Report	58' (0:1) Merson; (yellow card) 76' Vassell; (yellow card) 77' Wright	Attendance: 25,879; Referee: Eric Romain (Belgium)

21 August 2001 Second leg	Aston Villa (England)	4 – 1	(Switzerland) Basel	Villa Park, Birmingham
19:45	Vassell 45' (1:1); Ángel 55' (2:1); Ángel 78' (3:1); Stone (yellow card) 81'; Ginola 84' (4:1)	Report	30' (0:1) Chipperfield; (yellow card) 67' Varela	Attendance: 39,513; Referee: Claus Bo Larsen (Denmark)

Aston Villa won 5–2 on aggregate.

=== Lausanne-Sport ===
==== Intertoto Cup ====
===== First round =====
16 June 2001 First leg	UE Sant Julià (Moldova)	1–3	(Switzerland) Lausanne-Sport	Estadi Comunal d'Andorra la Vella, Andorra la Vella
18:00	Jiménez Soria 40'	Report	Chaveriat 5'; Simon 9'; Lutsenko 87'	Attendance: 820; Referee: Vladimir Antonov (Moldova)

23 June 2001 Second leg	Lausanne-Sport (Switzerland)	6–0	(Andorra) UE Sant Julià	Stade Olympique de la Pontaise, Lausanne
19:30	Masudi 24'; Kuźba 45'; Chaveriat 60', 66'; Thiaw 61'; Isaias 81'	Report		Attendance: 1,150; Referee: Meir Levi (Israel)

Lausanne-Sport won 9–1 on aggregate.

===== Second round =====
30 June 2001 First leg	Sturm Graz (Austria)	0–1	(Switzerland) Lausanne-Sport	Arnold Schwarzenegger-Stadium, Graz
20:00		Report	Masudi 64'	Attendance: 5,650; Referee: Sten Kaldma (Estonia)

7 July 2001 Second leg	Lausanne-Sport (Switzerland)	3–3	(Austria) Sturm Graz	Stade Olympique de la Pontaise, Lausanne
19:30	Masudi 36'; Isaias 61'; Kuźba 69'	Report	Vastić 40' (pen.); Haas 77', 86'	Attendance: 1,600; Referee: Oleg Chikun (Belarus)

Lausanne-Sport won 4–3 on aggregate.

===== Third round =====
14 July 2001 First leg	Publikum Celje (Slovenia)	1–1	(Switzerland) Lausanne-Sport	Skalna Klet, Celje
18:00	Beršnjak 70'	Report	Margairaz 78'	Attendance: 800; Referee: Laurent Duhamel (France)

21 July 2001 Second leg	Lausanne-Sport (Switzerland)	0–0	(Slovenia) Publikum Celje	Stade Olympique de la Pontaise, Lausanne
19:30		Report		Attendance: 1,450; Referee: Paul Allaerts (Belgium)

1–1 on aggregate. Lausanne-Sport won on away goals.

===== Semi-final =====
25 July 2001 First leg	Basel (Switzerland)	3 – 0	(Switzerland) Lausanne	St. Jakob-Park, Basel
19:30	Giménez 19' (1:0); Giménez 21' (2:0); M. Yakin (yellow card) 42'; H. Yakin 45' (3:0)	Report	(yellow card) 42' Margairaz	Attendance: 14,872; Referee: Ferenc Bede (Hungary)

1 August 2001 Second leg	Lausanne-Sport (Switzerland)	2 – 2	(Switzerland) Basel	Stade Olympique de la Pontaise, Lausanne
16:30	Thiaw 8' (1:0); Thiaw 45' (2:1); Thiaw (yellow card) 51' (red card) 54'	Report	18' (1:1) Tum; 62' (2:2) Varela	Attendance: 2,050; Referee: Vasily Melnichuk (Ukraine)

Basel won 5–2 on aggregate.

=== Vaduz ===
==== UEFA Cup ====
===== Qualifying round =====
9 August 2001 First leg	Vaduz (Liechtenstein)	3–3	(Croatia) Varteks	Rheinpark Stadion, Vaduz
19:30	Niederhäuser 41'; Merenda 53', 75'	Report	Bjelanović 49', 85', 86'	Attendance: 1,065; Referee: Loizos Loizou (Cyprus)

23 August 2001 Second leg	Varteks (Croatia)	6–1	(Liechtenstein) Vaduz	Stadion Varteks, Varaždin
20:00	Mumlek 8' (pen.); Bjelanović 20'; Andričević 25'; Drobne 71', 75'; Režić 86'	Report	Merenda 48'	Attendance: 2,070; Referee: Sorin Altmayer (Romania)

Varteks won 9–4 on aggregate.

== Sources ==
- Switzerland 2001–02 at RSSSF
- 1. Liga season 2001–02 at the official website
- Switzerland Cup 2001–02 at RSSSF
- Cup finals at Fussball-Schweiz
- UEFA Intertoto Cup 2001 at RSSSF
- Josef Zindel (2018). FC Basel 1893. Die ersten 125 Jahre (in German). Basel: Friedrich Reinhardt Verlag. ISBN 978-3-7245-2305-5.

Preceded by 2001–02	Seasons in Swiss football	Succeeded by 2003–04
