= Christian Giménez =

Christian Giménez or Christian Gimenez may refer to:

- Christian Giménez (footballer, born 1974), Argentine football striker from Buenos Aires
- Christian Giménez (footballer, born 1981), Argentine-Mexican football midfielder from Resistencia, Chaco
- Christian Giménez (footballer, born 1994), Paraguayan football striker from Buenos Aires
