= Alberto Regazzoni =

Swiss footballer (born 1983)

Personal information
- Full name: Alberto Regazzoni
- Date of birth: 4 May 1983 (age 43)
- Place of birth: Lugano, Switzerland
- Height: 1.69 m (5 ft 7 in)
- Positions: Left winger; striker

Team information
- Current team: AC Sementina

Youth career
- 1990–1999: Lugano

Senior career*
Years	Team	Apps	(Gls)
1999–2003	Lugano	70	(18)
2003–2004	Malcantone Agno	34	(12)
2004–2007	Sion	85	(18)
2007–2011	Young Boys	96	(14)
2011–2013	St. Gallen	52	(7)
2013–2014	Sion	11	(0)
2014–2017	Chiasso	97	(16)
2017	Mendrisio-Stabio	11	(2)
2018–	AC Sementina	?	(?)

International career
2006–2007	Switzerland	3	(0)
- * Club domestic league appearances and goals as of 17 May 2018

Alberto Regazzoni (born 4 May 1983) is a footballer from Switzerland who currently plays as left winger for AC Sementina. He has also played for the Swiss national squad.

He started his career at FC Lugano, after the club faced bankruptcy near the end of 2002–03 season, he transferred to FC Malcantone Agno. In 2006 he came on as a substitute and scored the winning penalty in the shootout as Sion defeated BSC Young Boys in the Swiss Cup Final.

== Honours ==
Sion

- Swiss Cup: 2005–06
