= Jann Ingi Petersen =

Faroese footballer

Jann Petersen
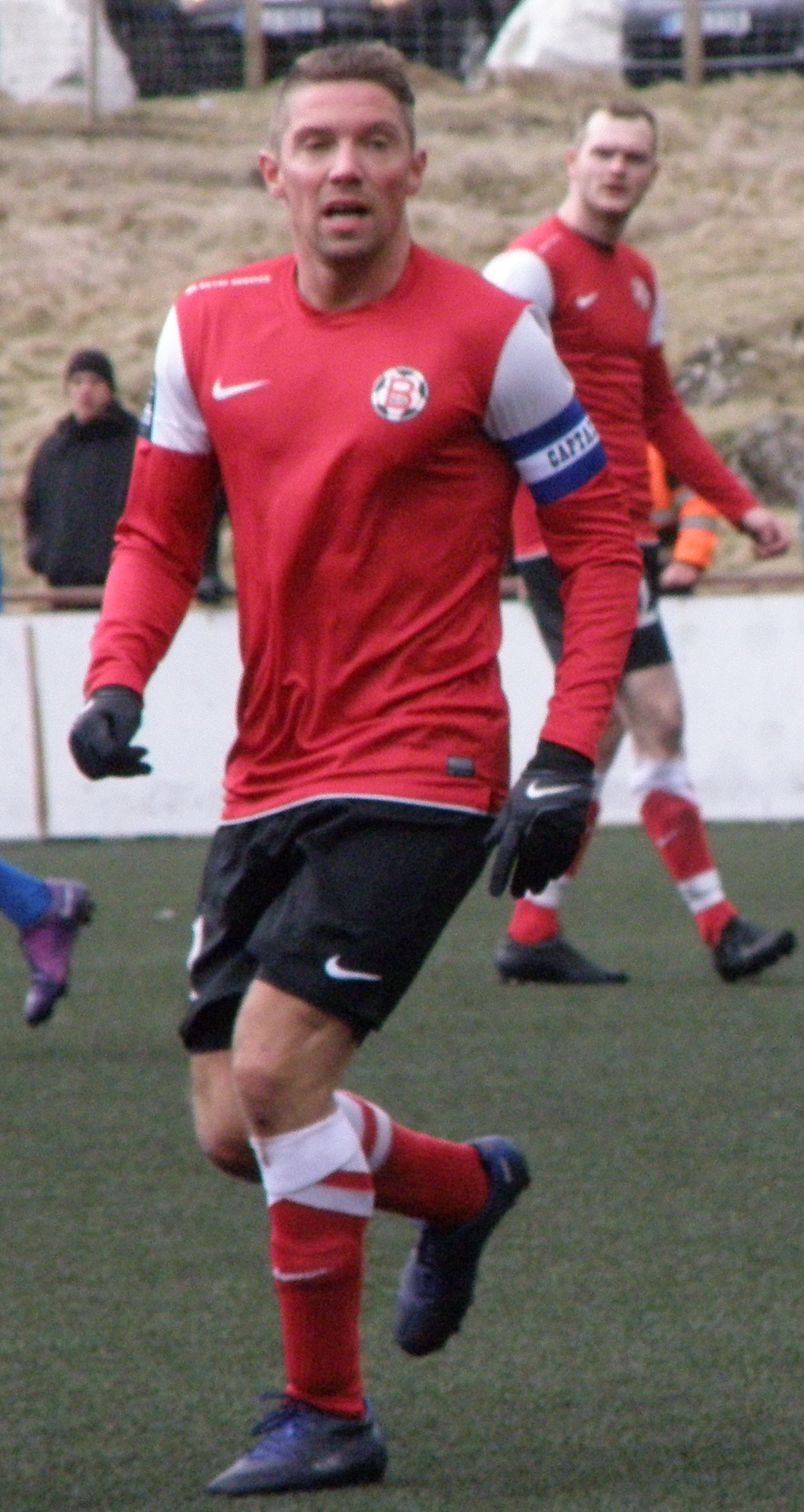

Personal information
- Full name: Jann Ingi Petersen
- Date of birth: 7 January 1984 (age 42)
- Place of birth: Saltnes, Faroe Islands
- Height: 1.78 m (5 ft 10 in)
- Position: Midfielder

Team information
- Current team: B68 Toftir
- Number: 11

Senior career*
| Years | Team | Apps | (Gls) |
| 2000–2003 | B68 | 46 | (2) |
| 2004 | Fremad Amager | | |
| 2005–2008 | B68 | | |
| 2009–2010 | NSÍ Runavík | 50 | (8) |
| 2011– | B68 | 16 | (1) |

International career^{‡}
| 2003– | Faroe Islands | 23 | (0) |
- * Club domestic league appearances and goals as of 24 April 2012 ‡ National team caps and goals as of 28 April 2013

Jann Ingi Petersen (born 7 January 1984) is a Faroese footballer who plays as a midfielder. He is currently under contract with B68 Toftir. He usually plays as a controlling midfielder.

Petersen is specialised in both penalty kicks and free kicks.

He has been capped 23 times for the Faroe Islands national team.
