= Stefan Blunschi =

Swiss footballer (born 1983)

Personal information
- Date of birth: 10 August 1983 (age 43)
- Place of birth: Switzerland
- Position: Midfielder

Youth career
- FC Lucerne

Senior career*
Years	Team	Apps	(Gls)
1999–2002	FC Lucerne	38	(3)
2002–2003	FC Baden	20	(8)
2003–2004	FC Wil	30	(1)
2004	FC Aarau	0	(0)
2004–2008	SC Cham	42	(11)
- * Club domestic league appearances and goals

Stefan Blunschi (born 10 August 1983) is a Swiss former professional footballer who played for FC Lucerne, FC Baden, FC Wil, FC Aarau and SC Cham.

Blunschi began playing football with FC Luzern's youth side, and he initially showed promise before moving on to other clubs. He won the 2003–04 Swiss Cup with FC Wil, shortly before the club was relegated at the end of the season. Just weeks after signing a two-year contract with Aarau, Blunschi suffered a back injury which ended his professional football career.
