= Fabio Digenti =

Swiss football player (born 1983)

Personal information
- Date of birth: 6 March 1983 (age 43)
- Place of birth: Zürich, Switzerland
- Height: 1.76 m (5 ft 9 in)
- Position: Midfielder

Team information
- Current team: FC Linth 04 (manager)

Senior career*
Years	Team	Apps	(Gls)
2002–2003	Grasshoppers	9	(0)
2004	Schaffhausen	6	(0)
2004–2006	Winterthur	59	(9)
2006–2007	Wohlen	25	(3)
2007–2008	Winterthur	15	(0)
2008	Gossau	2	(0)
2009–2010	Chiasso	8	(0)
2011–2015	SV Rümlang		

International career
1999	Switzerland U-16	5	(3)
2000–2001	Switzerland U-17	11	(3)
2003–2004	Switzerland U-20	5	(0)

Managerial career
- 2015–2017: SV Rümlang
- 2017–2019: FC Uster
- 2019–: FC Linth 04
- * Club domestic league appearances and goals

Fabio Digenti (born 6 March 1983) is a Swiss football coach and a former player. He is the manager of fourth-tier Swiss 1. Liga club FC Linth 04.

== Club career ==
Digenti previously played in the Swiss Super League for Grasshoppers.

He also has Italian and English descent.

== See also ==
- Football in Switzerland
- List of football clubs in Switzerland
