= Gürkan Sermeter =

Swiss footballer (born 1974)

Personal information
- Date of birth: 14 February 1974 (age 52)
- Place of birth: Switzerland
- Height: 1.81 m (5 ft 11 1/2 in)
- Position: Midfielder

Senior career*
Years	Team	Apps	(Gls)
1993–1995	Grasshopper-Club Zurich	38	(0)
1995–1996	BSC Young Boys	12	(10)
1996–1998	FC Luzern	39	(7)
1998–2000	Grasshopper-Club Zurich	38	(3)
2000–2006	BSC Young Boys	172	(38)
2006–2008	FC Aarau	62	(9)
2008–2012	AC Bellinzona	88	(18)
- * Club domestic league appearances and goals

Gürkan Sermeter (born 14 February 1974) is a Swiss former footballer who last played for AC Bellinzona in the Swiss Challenge League.
