= 2003–04 Swiss Challenge League =

Football league

The 2003–04 Swiss Challenge League was the first season of the Swiss Challenge League, and the 72nd season of the second tier of the Swiss football league pyramid. It began on 18 July 2003 and ended on 22 May 2004. The champions of this season, FC Schaffhausen, earned promotion to the 2004–05 Super League. SR Delémont finished last and were relegated to the Swiss 1. Liga.

== League table ==
| Pos | Team | Pld | W | D | L | GF | GA | GD | BP | Pts | Promotion or relegation |
|---|---|---|---|---|---|---|---|---|---|---|---|
| 1 | FC Schaffhausen (C, P) | 32 | 17 | 9 | 6 | 52 | 39 | +13 | 24 | 84 | Promotion to 2004–05 Swiss Super League |
| 2 | FC Vaduz | 32 | 16 | 9 | 7 | 56 | 34 | +22 | 22 | 79 | Qualification for Promotion play-off |
| 3 | FC Chiasso | 32 | 16 | 6 | 10 | 49 | 31 | +18 | 24 | 78 | |
| 4 | FC Malcantone Agno (Note: FC Malcantone Agno merged with AC Lugano, who will replace the club for the 2004-05 season.) | 32 | 16 | 7 | 9 | 48 | 38 | +10 | 18 | 73 | |
| 5 | FC Wohlen | 32 | 12 | 14 | 6 | 46 | 39 | +7 | 22 | 72 | |
| 6 | FC Sion (Note: FC Sion was admitted into the league on 29 October 2003. Because of the late fixtures, the club's season ended later) | 32 | 13 | 11 | 8 | 47 | 33 | +14 | 20 | 70 | |
| 7 | Yverdon-Sport FC | 32 | 12 | 10 | 10 | 50 | 37 | +13 | 24 | 70 | |
| 8 | SC Kriens | 32 | 14 | 7 | 11 | 44 | 40 | +4 | 18 | 67 | |
| 9 | FC Concordia Basel | 32 | 15 | 6 | 11 | 54 | 48 | +6 | 14 | 65 | |
| 10 | FC Lucerne | 32 | 12 | 10 | 10 | 46 | 43 | +3 | 18 | 64 | |
| 11 | AC Bellinzona | 32 | 13 | 3 | 16 | 47 | 58 | −11 | 14 | 56 | |
| 12 | FC Bulle | 32 | 9 | 10 | 13 | 42 | 54 | −12 | 12 | 49 | |
| 13 | FC Meyrin | 32 | 9 | 10 | 13 | 43 | 53 | −10 | 10 | 47 | |
| 14 | FC Baden | 32 | 9 | 4 | 19 | 38 | 57 | −19 | 10 | 41 | |
| 15 | FC Winterthur | 32 | 8 | 6 | 18 | 38 | 47 | −9 | 10 | 40 | |
| 16 | FC La Chaux-de-Fonds | 32 | 7 | 7 | 18 | 25 | 47 | −22 | 8 | 36 | |
| 17 | SR Delémont (R) | 32 | 6 | 7 | 19 | 37 | 64 | −27 | 4 | 29 | Relegated to 2004–05 Swiss 1. Liga |

Source: RSSSF
Rules for classification: During the season, the winner of each confrontation return received 2 bonus points. This system will be abolished for the 2004-05 season
(C) Champions; (P) Promoted; (R) Relegated

== Promotion/relegation playoff ==
| 29 May 2004 First Leg | Neuchatel Xamax | 2-0 | FC Vaduz | Stade de la Maladière |
| | Gérald Forschelet 28'; Alexandre Rey 50' |

| 31 May 2004 Second Leg | FC Vaduz | 2-1 | Neuchatel Xamax | Rheinpark Stadion |
| | Franz Burgmeier 12'; Steve Gohouri 35' | | Mobulu M'Futi 55' |

Neuchâtel Xamax won 3-2 on aggregate, so it maintains its place in the Super League

FC Vaduz remains in the Challenge League

=== Promoted clubs ===
- To Super League - FC Schaffhausen
- FC Wil replaces SR Delémont to increase the league's size to 18 clubs
- From 1. Liga - SC YF Juventus and FC Baulmes

=== Relegated clubs ===
- To 1. Liga - SR Delémont
