= Mobulu M'Futi =

Congolese-Swiss footballer

Personal information
- Date of birth: 28 August 1981 (age 45)
- Place of birth: Kinshasa, Zaire
- Height: 1.72 m (5 ft 8 in)
- Position: Striker

Team information
- Current team: Stade Nyonnais

Youth career
- FC Monthey

Senior career*
Years	Team	Apps	(Gls)
1999–2002	Sion	53	(5)
2002–2005	Neuchâtel Xamax	90	(23)
2005–2007	Istres	52	(10)
2007–2010	Sion	41	(6)
2010	→ FC Aarau (loan)	11	(0)
2010–2012	Servette	23	(4)
2012	→ Étoile Carouge (loan)	11	(1)
2012–2013	Stade Nyonnais	21	(12)
2013–2014	Le Mont	18	(3)
Total		320	(64)
- * Club domestic league appearances and goals

Mobulu M'Futi (born 28 August 1981) is a Congolese-Swiss former professional footballer who played as a striker.

== Career ==
M'Futi was born in Kinshasa.

He played for FC Sion from 2000 to 2002 before spending three seasons with Neuchâtel Xamax.

In 2007, after two seasons with French side FC Istres, M'Futi returned to FC Sion on a three-year contract.

On 21 February 2010, M'Futi joined FC Aarau on loan from Sion until the end of season,
