= Murat Yakin =

Swiss football manager (born 1974)

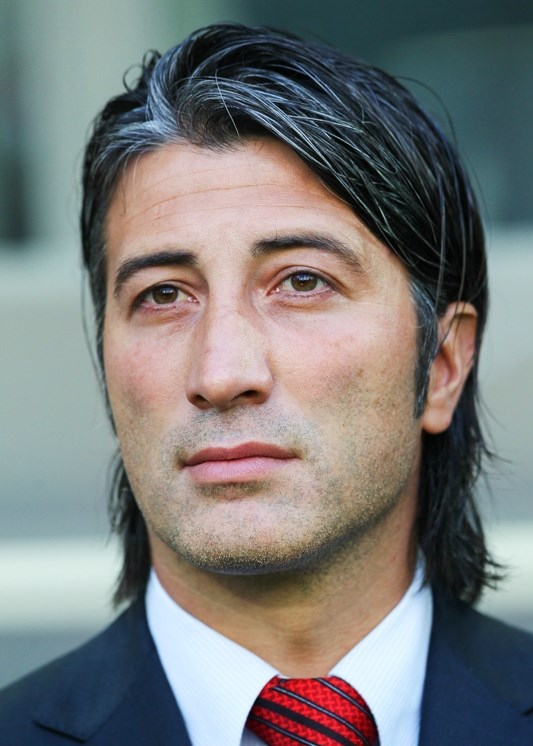
- Yakin in 2014

Personal information
- Full name: Murat Yakin
- Date of birth: 15 September 1974 (age 52)
- Place of birth: Basel, Switzerland
- Height: 1.83 m (6 ft 0 in)
- Position: Centre back

Team information
- Current team: Switzerland (manager)

Senior career*
Years	Team	Apps	(Gls)
1992–1997	Grasshoppers	101	(17)
1997–1998	VfB Stuttgart	23	(2)
1998–2000	Fenerbahçe	26	(3)
2000	Basel	23	(2)
2000–2001	1. FC Kaiserslautern	9	(0)
2001–2006	Basel	91	(24)
Total		273	(48)

International career
1994–2004	Switzerland	49	(4)

Managerial career
- 2006–2007: Concordia Basel (assistant)
- 2007: Grasshoppers (assistant)
- 2008: FC Frauenfeld
- 2008–2009: Grasshoppers (B team)
- 2009–2011: Thun
- 2011–2012: Luzern
- 2012–2014: Basel
- 2014–2015: Spartak Moscow
- 2016–2017: Schaffhausen
- 2017–2018: Grasshoppers
- 2018–2019: Sion
- 2019–2021: Schaffhausen
- 2021–: Switzerland
- * Club domestic league appearances and goals

Murat Yakin (Turkish: Murat Yakın; [mu'ɾat jaˈkɯn]; born 15 September 1974) is a Swiss football coach and former player who is currently the manager of the Switzerland national team.

In 2021, following stints as manager at Swiss clubs including Basel, Grasshoppers and Sion, he was appointed as coach of the Swiss national team, guiding them to qualification for the 2022 FIFA World Cup, UEFA Euro 2024 and the 2026 FIFA World Cup.

== Playing career ==
Yakin spent the longest spell of his career playing for his hometown club Basel, where he was the defensive linchpin, captain and libero of a team which enjoyed domestic and relative European success. He won the Swiss Super League on five occasions (1995, 1996, 2002, 2004, 2005), and the Swiss Cup three times (1994, 2002, 2003). He recalls the 2002–Champions League second leg qualifying match on 28 August 2002 against Celtic in St. Jakob-Park as the "match of his life". Basel won the game 2–0, with Yakin scoring the second goal in the 22nd minute as Basel qualified 3–3 on the away goals rule for the 2002–03 UEFA Champions League group stage.

In 2003, he played in the FIFA "Match against Poverty" in Basel, on Ronaldo's team which won 4–3 against Zinedine Zidane's.

Yakin was capped 49 times for the Switzerland national team, representing his country at UEFA Euro 2004.

== Coaching career ==
=== Early career ===
Yakin was appointed coach of Thun in 2009, after a time as a youth coach at Grasshoppers and head coach of Frauenfeld. Yakin led Thun to promotion in his first year as manager there, winning the Swiss Challenge League in 2010. In his second season with the club, Thun managed to finish fifth in the Swiss Super League and earned a spot in the second qualifying round of the following season's UEFA Europa League.

In May 2011, he joined Luzern for a reported 200,000 Swiss francs. He took over from Christian Brand, who was made caretaker after the sacking of Rolf Fringer.

=== Basel ===
On 15 October 2012, Yakin was appointed as the new manager of Basel. Under his management, Basel won twice, home and away, against Chelsea in the 2013–14 Champions League group stage. He praised the supporters in the stadium, saying that they pushed the team to win through the 90 minutes. He was also delighted to have received praise from then Chelsea manager José Mourinho. On 17 May 2014, Basel announced Yakin was no longer with the club after he guided them to two domestic titles in as many years.

=== Spartak Moscow ===
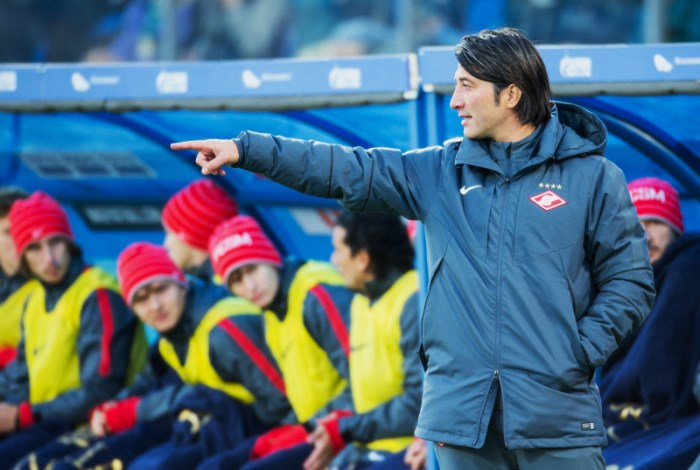
Yakin managing Spartak Moscow in 2014

On 16 June 2014, Yakin was appointed as manager of Russian Premier League side Spartak Moscow. According to Russian media, the deal was a long-term contract with Yakin earning an annual salary of 1.6 million euros ($2.18 million).

On 30 May 2015, after only one season with the club, his contract with the club was terminated after a mutual agreement.

=== Return to Schaffhausen ===
On 17 June 2019, it was confirmed, that Yakin had returned to Schaffhausen, as their new manager having left Sion previously that year.

=== Switzerland national team ===
On 9 August 2021, Yakin was appointed as the manager of the Switzerland national team. In the 2022 World Cup qualification, Northern Ireland held reigning European champions Italy to a goalless draw, thereby ensuring that Switzerland qualified for the tournament and Italy had to play in the playoffs. In gratitude, he sent 9.3 kg of Swiss chocolate to the Irish Football Association. In the 2022 FIFA World Cup, he led Switzerland to finish second in their group, to qualify to the round of 16, where they lost 6–1 to Portugal. At the UEFA Euro 2024 tournament, Yakin guided Switzerland through to the Round of 16 knockout stage where they recorded a famous 2–0 victory against defending champions Italy. They were subsequently knocked out of the quarter-finals in a penalty shootout loss to England, after a 1–1 draw. In the 2026 FIFA World Cup, Switzerland reached the quarter-finals for the first time since 1954 after defeating Colombia in a penalty shootout in the round of 16.

== Personal life ==
Yakin is the elder brother of Hakan Yakin, who was also a professional footballer with successful stints at Grasshoppers, Basel, and Young Boys and represented Switzerland at international level also. Yakin is of Turkish descent.

== Career statistics ==
No.	Date	Venue	Opponent	Score	Result	Competition
1.	6 October 1996	Helsinki, Finland	Finland	3–1	3–2	1998 FIFA World Cup qualification
2.	11 October 1997	Zurich, Switzerland	Azerbaijan	3–0	5–0	1998 FIFA World Cup qualification
3.	21 August 2001	Basel, Switzerland	Austria	3–1	3–2	Friendly
4.	12 October 2002	Tirana, Albania	Albania	1–0	1–1	UEFA Euro 2004 qualification

== Managerial statistics ==
As of match played 16 November 2026

Managerial record by team and tenure
Team	Nat.	From	To	Record								Ref.
Team	Nat.	From	To	G	W	D	L	GF	GA	GD	Win %	Ref.
Thun	(Switzerland)	1 July 2009	1 July 2011	74	35	23	16	138	85	+53	47.30	
Luzern	(Switzerland)	1 July 2011	19 August 2012	46	19	16	11	64	46	+18	41.30	
Basel	(Switzerland)	15 October 2012	19 May 2014	99	56	28	15	172	91	+81	56.57	
Spartak Moscow	(Russia)	16 June 2014	30 May 2015	32	13	8	11	43	44	−1	40.63	
Schaffhausen	(Switzerland)	21 December 2016	28 August 2017	25	19	2	4	66	24	+42	76.00	
Grasshoppers	(Switzerland)	28 August 2017	10 April 2018	26	9	7	10	34	29	+5	34.62	
Sion	(Switzerland)	17 September 2018	7 May 2019	28	9	7	12	38	45	−7	32.14	
Schaffhausen	(Switzerland)	17 June 2019	9 August 2021	77	22	26	29	97	117	−20	28.57	
Switzerland	(Switzerland)	9 August 2021	Present	71	33	24	14	127	74	+53	46.48	
Career Total				478	215	141	122	777	555	+222	44.98	

== Honours ==
=== As a player ===
Grasshoppers

- Nationalliga A: 1994–95, 1995–96
- Swiss Cup: 1993–94

Basel

- Nationalliga A/Swiss Super League: 2001–02, 2003–04, 2004–05
- Swiss Cup: 2001–02, 2002–03

Individual

- Swiss Young Player of the Year: 1994
- Axpo Swiss Super Leaguer Player of the Year: 2002

=== As a manager ===
Thun

- Swiss Challenge League: 2009–10

Basel

- Swiss Super League: 2012–13, 2013–14

Individual

- Swiss Super League Manager of the Year: 2013–14, 2017–18
