= Miguel Portillo =

Argentine footballer

Personal information
- Full name: Miguel Alfredo Portillo (Pipo)
- Date of birth: 26 September 1982 (age 44)
- Place of birth: Gobernador Virasoro, Argentina
- Height: 1.79 m (5 ft 10 1/2 in)
- Positions: Central defender; fullback

Team information
- Current team: FC Köniz

Senior career*
Years	Team	Apps	(Gls)
2001–2002	Boca Juniors	0	(0)
2002–2004	Neuchâtel Xamax	61	(2)
2004	Servette FC	9	(0)
2005	Angers SCO	7	(0)
2005–2006	BSC Young Boys	32	(0)
2006–2007	FC Vaduz	28	(0)
2007–2010	BSC Young Boys	32	(1)
2009–2010	→ AC Lugano (loan)	14	(0)
2010–2011	Chornomorets Odesa	25	(1)
2011–2012	Beitar Jerusalem	13	(0)
2012–	FC Köniz		
- * Club domestic league appearances and goals as of July 9, 2011 ‡ National team caps and goals as of 28 January 2007

Miguel Alfredo Portillo (born September 26, 1982 in Gobernador Virasoro), nicknamed Pipo, is a football defender from Argentina who currently plays for the Swiss regional side FC Köniz.

== Career ==
Portillo started his career at Argentine giants Boca Juniors in 2001, he never played a league game for the club but took part in 2 Copa Mercosur games in 2001. He has had spells at several Swiss clubs and the French team Angers SCO, on 5 September 2009 AC Lugano have signed Young Boys' Argentinian defender on loan until the end of the season. After the season ended, Portillo joined Chornomorets Odesa in July 2010.
