= Roland Schwegler =

Swiss footballer (born 1982)

Personal information
- Full name: Roland Schwegler
- Date of birth: 3 February 1982 (age 44)
- Place of birth: Bern, Switzerland
- Height: 1.81 m (5 ft 11 in)
- Position: Defender

Youth career
- 1996–1997: FC Hochdorf
- 1997–1999: Grasshoppers

Senior career*
Years	Team	Apps	(Gls)
1999–2007	Grasshoppers	110	(11)
2004–2005	Grasshoppers U-21	6	(0)
2007–2010	FC Luzern	76	(2)
2010–2012	FC Vaduz	42	(2)
Total		224	(15)

International career
2001–2003	Switzerland U-21	21	(0)

Managerial career
- 2014–2019: FC Linth 04
- 2019–2025: SC Cham
- * Club domestic league appearances and goals

Roland Schwegler (born 3 February 1982) is a Swiss professional manager and former footballer who played as a defender. He last manager of SC Cham until 2025.
