= 2002–03 Nationalliga A =

Swiss football season

Nationalliga A
- Season: 2002–03
- Champions: Grasshopper Club; 27th title
- Relegated: Luzern; Delémont
- Champions League: Grasshopper Club
- UEFA Cup: Basel; Neuchâtel Xamax; Young Boys
- Top goalscorer: Richard Núñez (27 goals)

The 2002–03 season of the Swiss Nationalliga contained two divisions, each with twelve clubs. The top tier was called Nationalliga A (NLA) (French: Ligue Nationale A, Italian: Lega Nazionale A) and the second tier was named Nationalliga B (NLB).

== Overview ==
The season was divided into two phases. The first of which was the qualification phase, and within the divisions the teams played a double round-robin, one at home and the other away. The divisions were then split. The first eight teams of the NLA then competed in the championship group and played a further double round-robin. The teams in ninth to twelfth position competed with the top four teams of the NLB in a promotion/relegation group to decide which two teams would play top tier next season. The top tier was to be reduced from twelve to ten clubs, the second tier was to increased to 16 teams. The other eight teams of the second tier competed in a play-out against relegation to the 1. Liga. Originally two teams were to be relegated.

This was to be the last season that the Swiss championship would be competed in this format. For the next season the Nationalliga would be renamed to Swiss Football League and the championships were subsequently renamed as Super League and Challenge League.

== Nationalliga A ==
=== Qualification phase ===
==== Table ====
Pos	Team	Pld	W	D	L	GF	GA	GD	BP	Pts	Qualification
1	Grasshopper Club	22	15	4	3	58	26	+32	0	49	Advance to championship round halved points (rounded up) as bonus
2	Basel	22	14	5	3	57	25	+32	0	47	Advance to championship round halved points (rounded up) as bonus
3	Thun	22	9	4	9	33	33	0	0	31	Advance to championship round halved points (rounded up) as bonus
4	Wil	22	8	7	7	43	45	−2	0	31	Advance to championship round halved points (rounded up) as bonus
5	Zürich	22	9	4	9	35	37	−2	0	31	Advance to championship round halved points (rounded up) as bonus
6	Xamax	22	8	7	7	30	33	−3	0	31	Advance to championship round halved points (rounded up) as bonus
7	Young Boys	22	8	6	8	41	41	0	0	30	Advance to championship round halved points (rounded up) as bonus
8	Servette	22	8	5	9	45	37	+8	0	29	Advance to championship round halved points (rounded up) as bonus
9	Luzern	22	7	5	10	31	38	−7	−2	24	Continue to promotion/relegation round
10	St. Gallen	22	6	6	10	31	48	−17	0	24	Continue to promotion/relegation round
11	SR Delémont	22	6	2	14	24	44	−20	0	20	Continue to promotion/relegation round
12	Aarau	22	5	3	14	19	40	−21	0	18	Continue to promotion/relegation round

Source: RSSSF
Rules for classification: 1) points; 2) goal difference; 3) number of goals scored.
FC Luzern 2 points deducted for irregularities in license application, therefore total points: 24

==== Results ====
Home \ Away	AAR	BAS	DEL	GCZ	LUZ	NX	SER	STG	THU	WIL	YB	ZÜR
Aarau		0–1	3–0	2–3	1–2	2–0	0–3	1–1	2–0	0–0	1–1	3–1
Basel	4–0		1–0	1–2	2–3	1–1	4–2	6–0	3–0	7–1	2–1	5–3
Delémont	2–1	1–2		2–4	2–2	2–1	2–0	6–2	0–1	1–2	2–4	2–2
Grasshoppers	3–0	2–3	3–0		3–2	4–0	2–0	1–1	4–1	4–1	4–0	1–1
Luzern	2–0	1–1	3–0	1–0		0–1	4–3	1–0	1–2	1–1	0–0	1–3
Neuchâtel Xamax	3–1	1–1	0–1	1–5	3–2		2–1	1–0	2–1	1–1	3–1	2–2
Servette	5–0	0–1	5–0	4–3	2–0	1–1		2–0	3–1	1–1	4–4	2–0
St. Gallen	1–0	1–1	3–0	2–3	5–0	0–2	2–2		2–2	2–2	2–1	0–3
Thun	2–0	4–2	0–1	2–2	3–1	1–1	1–0	0–1		3–0	3–4	0–0
Wil	4–0	1–4	2–0	1–1	2–1	2–1	2–2	11–3	1–5		3–2	0–1
Young Boys	1–0	1–1	2–0	0–2	2–2	1–1	4–2	1–2	3–0	4–2		2–1
Zürich	1–2	0–4	1–0	1–2	2–1	3–2	3–1	2–1	0–1	1–3	4–2	

Legend: Blue = home team win; Yellow = draw; Red = away team win.

=== Championship round ===
The first eight teams of the qualification then competed in the Championship Round. They took half of the points (rounded up to complete units) gained in the Qualification as bonus with them.

==== Table ====
Pos	Team	Pld	W	D	L	GF	GA	GD	BP	Pts	Qualification
1	Grasshopper Club (C, Q)	14	9	5	0	37	15	+22	25	57	Champions; Qualification to Champions League third qualifying round
2	Basel (C, Q)	14	10	2	2	38	17	+21	24	56	Swiss Cup winners Qualification to UEFA Cup first round
3	Neuchâtel Xamax (Q)	14	5	4	5	18	17	+1	16	35	Qualification to UEFA Cup qualifying round
4	Young Boys (Q)	14	6	1	7	21	29	−8	15	34	Qualification to UEFA Cup qualifying round
5	Zürich	14	4	3	7	20	23	−3	16	31	
6	Servette	14	4	4	6	16	26	−10	15	31	
7	Thun (Q)	14	3	3	8	18	30	−12	16	28	Qualification to Intertoto Cup second round
8	Wil (Q)	14	2	4	8	19	30	−11	16	26	Qualification to Intertoto Cup first round

Source: RSSSF
Rules for classification: 1) points; 2) Position in the qualification
(C) Champions; (Q) Qualified for the phase indicated

==== Results ====
Home \ Away	BAS	GCZ	NX	SER	THU	WIL	YB	ZÜR
Basel		2–2	3–0	2–0	4–0	3–1	3–0	3–1
Grasshoppers	2–2		2–2	1–1	5–1	4–2	4–0	2–0
Neuchâtel Xamax	3–1	0–1		1–3	1–0	3–0	2–0	2–0
Servette	0–4	0–4	0–0		3–1	1–0	1–1	2–1
Thun	1–4	1–2	2–1	3–1		1–1	4–2	1–2
Wil	4–5	1–3	1–1	1–1	2–2		0–1	1–0
Young Boys	2–0	2–4	3–1	2–1	1–0	3–4		2–1
Zürich	1–2	1–1	1–1	5–2	1–1	2–1	4–2	

Legend: Blue = home team win; Yellow = draw; Red = away team win.

== Nationalliga B ==
=== Qualification phase ===
==== Table ====
Pos	Team	Pld	W	D	L	GF	GA	GD	BP	Pts	Qualification
1	FC Vaduz	22	12	5	5	47	32	+15	0	41	Advance to promotion/relegation group NLA/NLB
2	FC Sion	22	12	3	7	35	27	+8	0	39	Advance to promotion/relegation group NLA/NLB
3	SC Kriens	22	11	5	6	48	36	+12	0	38	Advance to promotion/relegation group NLA/NLB
4	FC Lugano	22	12	6	4	36	17	+19	−5	37	Advance to promotion/relegation group NLA/NLB
5	Yverdon-Sport FC	22	10	6	6	36	21	+15	0	36	Continue to relegation round NLB/1. Liga halved points (rounded up) as bonus
6	FC Schaffhausen	22	8	8	6	30	35	−5	0	32	Continue to relegation round NLB/1. Liga halved points (rounded up) as bonus
7	Lausanne-Sport	22	9	3	10	27	32	−5	0	30	Continue to relegation round NLB/1. Liga halved points (rounded up) as bonus
8	FC Concordia Basel	22	7	6	9	29	43	−14	0	27	Continue to relegation round NLB/1. Liga halved points (rounded up) as bonus
9	AC Bellinzona	22	7	4	11	32	34	−2	0	25	Continue to relegation round NLB/1. Liga halved points (rounded up) as bonus
10	FC Baden	22	4	6	12	26	38	−12	0	18	Continue to relegation round NLB/1. Liga halved points (rounded up) as bonus
11	FC Wohlen	22	4	4	14	23	42	−19	0	16	Continue to relegation round NLB/1. Liga halved points (rounded up) as bonus
12	FC Winterthur	22	4	8	10	24	36	−12	−8	12	Continue to relegation round NLB/1. Liga halved points (rounded up) as bonus

Source: RSSSF
Rules for classification: 1) points; 2) goal difference; 3) number of goals scored.
FC Lugano: 5 points deducted for irregularities in license application.
FC Winterthur: 8 points deducted for irregularities in license application.

=== Promotion/relegation NLA/NLB ===
==== Table ====
Pos	Team	Pld	W	D	L	GF	GA	GD	Pts	Qualification
1	Aarau (O)	12	9	1	2	30	13	+17	28	Qualification to Super League
2	St. Gallen (O)	12	7	3	2	25	9	+16	24	Qualification to Super League
3	Luzern (R)	12	4	4	4	24	22	+2	16	Qualification to Challenge League
4	Vaduz	12	3	4	5	17	23	−6	13	Qualification to Challenge League
5	Sion	12	3	3	6	14	18	−4	12	Licence refused
6	Delémont (R)	12	3	3	6	13	24	−11	12	Qualification to Challenge League
7	Kriens	12	3	2	7	14	28	−14	11	Qualification to Challenge League
8	Lugano	0	0	0	0	0	0	0	0	Relegated to 2. Liga

Source: RSSSF
Notes: FC Aarau and FC St. Gallen remained in Super League; no team promoted.
FC Luzern and SR Delémont relegated from Super League to Challenge League.
FC Lugano withdrew, were declared bankrupt and relegated to amateur status.
FC Sion were refused the Licence on the green table and were relegated to amateur status.
Rules for classification: 1) points; 2) Position in the qualification
(O) Play-off winners; (R) Relegated

==== Results ====
Home \ Away	AAR	DEL	KRI	LUZ	SIO	STG	VAD
Aarau		2–0	1–2	4–2	3–0	1–0	5–1
Delémont	1–2		2–2	3–3	2–1	1–4	2–1
Kriens	1–4	0–1		3–3	3–1	1–0	0–1
Luzern	0–1	5–0	2–1		1–1	1–5	4–0
Sion	3–1	1–0	3–0	0–1		1–1	2–4
St. Gallen	0–0	2–0	6–1	4–2	1–0		1–0
Vaduz	3–6	1–1	4–0	0–0	1–1	1–1	

Legend: Blue = home team win; Yellow = draw; Red = away team win.

=== Relegation NLB/1. Liga ===
==== Table ====
Pos	Team	Pld	W	D	L	GF	GA	GD	BP	Pts	Qualification
1	FC Schaffhausen	14	7	3	4	21	26	−5	16	40	Qualification to Challenge League
2	FC Concordia Basel	14	8	2	4	31	13	+18	14	40	Qualification to Challenge League
3	FC Baden	14	10	1	3	30	18	+12	9	40	Qualification to Challenge League
4	Yverdon-Sport FC	14	4	4	6	17	18	−1	18	34	Qualification to Challenge League
5	FC Wohlen	14	6	2	6	20	22	−2	8	28	Qualification to Challenge League
6	FC Lausanne-Sport	14	2	5	7	20	33	−13	15	26	Relegated to 2. Liga
7	AC Bellinzona	14	2	5	7	17	22	−5	13	24	Qualification to Challenge League
8	FC Winterthur	14	4	4	6	21	25	−4	6	22	Qualification to Challenge League

Source: RSSSF
Rules for classification: 1) points; 2) Position in the qualification;
FC Lausanne-Sport were declared bankrupt and relegated to amateur status
No team relegated to 1. Liga.

== Attendances ==
#	Club	Average
1	Basel	26,872
2	St. Gallen	8,967
3	GCZ	8,518
4	Young Boys	8,244
5	Servette	7,289
6	Zürich	6,639
7	Luzern	6,056
8	Xamax	5,711
9	Thun	4,380
10	Aarau	4,279
11	Wil	3,652
12	Delémont	2,450

== Sources ==
- RSSSF
