= Christian Giménez (footballer, born 1974) =

Argentine footballer (born 1974)

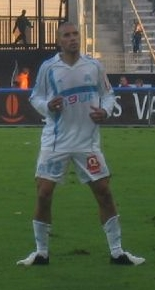
- Giménez playing for Marseille

Personal information
- Full name: Christian Eduardo Giménez
- Date of birth: 13 November 1974 (age 51)
- Place of birth: Buenos Aires, Argentina
- Height: 1.82 m (6 ft 0 in)
- Position: Striker

Senior career*
Years	Team	Apps	(Gls)
1991–1995	San Miguel	83	(26)
1995–1997	Boca Juniors	10	(3)
1996–1997	→ Nueva Chicago (loan)	24	(20)
1997–2001	Lugano	95	(55)
2001–2005	Basel	123	(94)
2005–2006	Marseille	21	(1)
2006–2007	Hertha BSC	28	(12)
2007–2008	Toluca	30	(9)
2009	Skoda Xanthi	0	(0)
2009	→ Locarno (loan)	10	(7)
2010	Chacarita Juniors	0	(0)
Total		424	(229)
- * Club domestic league appearances and goals

Christian Eduardo Giménez (born 13 November 1974) is an Argentine former professional footballer who played as a striker.

== Career ==
=== Early years ===
Born in Buenos Aires, Giménez started his career as a 17-year-old in the Argentine lower leagues, playing for Club Atlético San Miguel. In 1995, he was signed by the Boca Juniors, but he only played for them for one season before being loaned out to fellow Argentine team Nueva Chicago.

=== Lugano ===
In 1997, Boca Juniors sold Giménez to Swiss team FC Lugano, who in the previous season had suffered relegation. Under new head coach Karl Engel the team achieved immediate promotion. Giménez scored 17 goals in 26 appearances. In the top flight, the striker had a tough time, but in the 2000–01 he achieved the break-through. The team ended the season as runners-up and Giménez with 21 goals became league top goalscorer. Lugano played in the 2001–02 Champions League second qualifying round, but Giménez refused to play, thus forcing a transfer.

=== Basel ===
In July 2001 Giménez was sold to fellow Swiss outfit FC Basel to a reported transfer fee of 3.3 Million Swiss Francs. He joined Basel's first team during their 2001–02 season under head coach Christian Gross. Giménez made his team debut on 18 July 2001 in the 3–3 away draw with St. Gallen. Basel played in the 2001 UIC Cup. Giménez scored his first goal for his new team in the home game in the St. Jakob-Park on 25 July in the semi-final of the competition. In fact he scored twice as Basel won 3–0 against Lausanne-Sport. Basel advanced to the final but were defeated by Aston Villa. He scored his first domestic league goal with the team during the 3–1 home win against the Young Boys on 11 August. Giménez was to end the qualifying round as the league's top scorer with 19 goals in 20 appearances and Basel ended the qualification as league leaders. In the home game on 27 October he scored four goals as Basel won 5–1 against Xamax Basel started well into the second part of the season and during this period FCB played their best football, pulling away at the top of the table and subsequently achieved the championship title prematurely. Basel won the last game of the season, on 8 May 2002, and became champions ten points clear at the top of the table. Just four days later they played in the cup final against Grasshopper Club winning 2–1 in extra time, winning the double. Giménez was to end the season as league top scorer.

Basel's 2002–03 UEFA Champions League season started in the second qualifying round. After beating Žilina 4–1 on aggregate and Celtic on the away goals rule after a 3–3 aggregate, Basel advanced to the group stage. They ended this in second position behind Valencia, but ahead of Liverpool and Spartak Moscow to advance to the second group stage. They ended this in third position behind Manchester United and Juventus, but ahead of Deportivo La Coruña. Giménez played in 15 of these 16 matches scoring nine goals. Basel ended their league season as runners-up, but in the cup they advanced to the final and here they beat Xamax 6–0 to defend the title that they had won a season earlier. Giménez played in just three of the cup games but scored four goals.

In their 2003–04 league season the team started well, winning their first 13 matches straight out. The first defeat came on matchday 24. Basel won the championship with 26 victories and seven draws, the team had suffered just three away defeats, and obtained 85 points. Giménez scored a hat-trick in the away game against Thun on 16 August 2003. He remained as the team's top scorer with 16 goals but was only seventh best in the league. However, in the cup Basel were eliminated early, in round three.

Basel completed all the 2004–05 Super League season's seventeen home games undefeated, winning thirteen and drawing four. They ended the season as Swiss champions with 10 points advantage over second placed Thun. One of the season's highlights for the team, was the 8–1 home win on 12 September against rivals Grasshoppers in which Giménez scored four goals. Matías Delgado, Mladen Petrić, Djamel Mesbah and César Carignano each netted once. Giménez also scored for goals in the away game against Aarau as Basel won 5–0 on 20 April 2005. He also managed at hat-trick on 4 May as Basel won 5–0 in the away game against Xamax. He was the team's and the league's top goal scorer with 27 goals.

Giménez's time at Basel ended similar to that with previous team Lugano, through the back door and before a major Champions League qualifier. On 10 August 2005 Basel were to play against Werder Bremen in the 2005–06 Champions League third qualifying round, but he refused to play and forced the transfer. In his four seasons with the club he played a total of 229 games for Basel scoring a total of 159 goals. 123 of these games were in the Swiss Super League, 12 in the Swiss Cup, 31 in the UEFA competitions (Champions League, Europa League and UIC) and 63 were friendly games. He scored 94 goals in the domestic league, nine in the cup, 13 in the European games and the other 43 were scored during the test games.

=== Later years ===
In 2005, he moved to Olympique de Marseille. At first, Giménez was a regular in Marseille and scored a goal. It stayed that way. The Argentine failed to score and slipped out of the team. After a difficult year he signed a one-year loan agreement with German Bundesliga club Hertha BSC, on 4 August 2006. With Hertha things turned for the better, he scored 12 Bundesliga goals in 28 games. In April it was revealed that the transfer to Hertha would be made definitive at the end of the season. It was reported that the transfer costed one million Euros and that Giménez had signed a three-year contract, which was to run until 2009, but he was sold for double that fee just one month later. In August 2007, he was signed by Club Toluca on a three-year contract, but this contract was discontinued early, at the end of Clausura 2008 due to his poor performances.

In 2008, Giménez signed for Skoda Xanthi, before departing to play on loan by FC Locarno. The loan was announced on 16 February 2009 and he returned to Xanthi in the summer of that year, but he left the club.

As free agent on 4 January 2010, after months without a club he signed for Chacarita Juniors. Giménez was released by Chacarita Juniors after the end of the 2009–10 season.

== Personal life ==
Giménez lives in Argentina, in Buenos Aires. He is married and with his wife Natalia has three children Joaquin, was born in Basel, Constantino and Benicio. His current job still has a lot to do with playing football. He founded his own company called G & G 13 Sport and advises professional players and young players on their next career steps.

== Honours ==
Lugano

- Swiss Challenge League promotion: 1997–98

Basel

- Swiss Super League: 2001–02, 2003–04, 2004–05
- Swiss Cup: 2001–02, 2002–03

Individual

- Swiss League top goalscorer: 2000–01, 2001–02, 2004–05

== Sources ==
- Die ersten 125 Jahre. Publisher: Josef Zindel im Friedrich Reinhardt Verlag, Basel. ISBN 978-3-7245-2305-5
- Verein "Basler Fussballarchiv" Homepage
