= FC Malcantone Agno =

Swiss football club

- Full name: Football Club Malcantone Agno
- Nickname: Die Rot-Weissen
- Founded: 1955
- Dissolved: 2004
- Ground: Cornaredo Stadium, Switzerland
- Capacity: 15,000
- 2003–04: Swiss Challenge League, 4th
Home colours	Away colours

FC Malcantone Agno was a Swiss association football club based in Lugano. The club was established in 1955 but merged with FC Lugano in 2004. In its last season of existence, the team played in the second tier of Swiss football, the Nationalliga B, now known as the Swiss Challenge League.

== History ==
Formed on 1 July 1955, Malcantone Agno played primarily in the fourth tier of Swiss football. The club played its home games in the Centro Sportivo Passera, which offered space for 1,280 spectators. It was not until the 1998/99 season, under coach Silvano Gaffuri, the club was promoted to Swiss 1. Liga. The club were champions of the 1. Liga in the 2001/02 season under new Bosnian-Swiss coach Vladimir Petković but were defeated in the promotion playoffs 2–4 on aggregate against SC Young Fellows Juventus. However, they were promoted the following season having defeated FC La Chaux-de-Fonds 3–2 on aggregate.

In the 2003-04 season, their first season in the Nationalliga B, the club moved stadium to the Stadio Cornaredo which had been used by newly declared bankrupt FC Lugano. The club's debut season was relatively successful, finishing fourth with a strong spine built around Alberto Regazzoni and Yane Bugnard (who scored eleven goals each), future national goalkeeper Germano Vailati in goal and ex-international Régis Rothenbühler in defense.

That was to be the final season for the club as it merged with the bankrupt FC Lugano, to become AC Lugano. Vladimir Petković became the trainer of the new club and Malcantone president Giuseppe Morotti, became the new club president. The club's logo was incorporated into the lower end of AC Lugano's coat of arms.

League Positions
Season	Division	Tier	Place	Notes
1997/98	Swiss 2. Liga	IV	1st	Promoted to Swiss 1. Liga
1998/99	Swiss 1. Liga	III	9th	
1999/00	Swiss 1. Liga	III	4th	
2000/01	Swiss 1. Liga	III	6th	
2001/02	Swiss 1. Liga	III	1st	Reached Playoffs
2002/03	Swiss 1. Liga	III	1st	Promoted to Nationalliga B
2003/04	Nationalliga B	II	4th	Final season of existence

=== Former players ===
- Alberto Regazzoni (Switzerland)
- Germano Vailati (Switzerland)
- Marco Padalino (Switzerland)
- Yane Bugnard (Switzerland)

=== Former Managers ===
- (Switzerland) Silvano Gaffuri (1993–1999)
- (Bosnia and Herzegovina) (Switzerland) Vladimir Petković (1999–2004)
