= 1998–99 FC Basel season =

FC Basel
1998–99 season
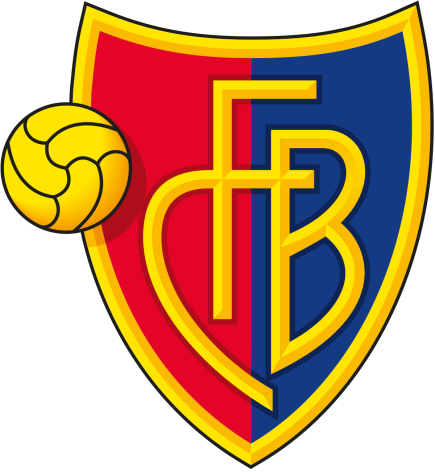
- Club president: René C. Jäggi
- Head coach: Guy Mathez (until May 1999); Marco Schällibaum (ad interim)
- Ground: St. Jakob Stadium (until 13 Dezember 1998); Stadion Schützenmatte (from 7 March 1999)
- 1998–99 NLA Qualification: 6th of 12
- Championship round: 5th of 8
- 1998–99 Swiss Cup: Round 5
- Top goalscorer: League: Mario Frick (10); All: Mario Frick (11)
- Highest home attendance: 34,735 on 13 December 1998 vs Lugano
- Lowest home attendance: 3,830 on 2 June 1999 vs Luzern
- Average home league attendance: 9,870

The 1998–99 Fussball Club Basel 1893 season was their 106th season since the club's foundation. Following their promotion at the end of the 1993–94 season this was their fifth consecutive season in the highest tier of Swiss football. René C. Jäggi was the club's chairman for the third consecutive year.

== Overview ==
In the first half of this season, until 13 Dezember, FCB played their home games in the St. Jakob Stadium, which was situated in the south-east of the city, neighboring the municipalities of Muttenz and Münchenstein. However, from 7 March 1999 the team played their home games in the Stadion Schützenmatte, situated in the west of the city about one and a half kilometers from the city centre. This would become their temporary home for two years, because the old stadium was demolished and the new stadium was to be built on the same site. The construction of the new stadium was to be completed in a little more than two years. The new stadium, the St. Jakob-Park, was to be an all seater, the old stadium had standing places on three sides.

Guy Mathez, who had taken over the coaching in January of that year, was appointed as the FCB new head-coach by club-president René C. Jäggi at the start of the season with a three year contract. However, on 16 May 1999, Mathez was dismissed without notice from his contract with the club, which was valid until the end of June 2001, because, among other things, he was alleged to have unlawfully profited from the transfer of the Brazilian Fabinho. Mathez was replaced immediately by Marco Schällibaum (ad interim) until the end of the season.

== The Campaign ==
=== Transfers ===
The club made many new signings as the season started, these included Mario Cantaluppi who returned from Servette. Also from Servette came the Romanian international Dan Potocianu and, on loan, the youngster Carlos Varela. Aleksandr Rytchkov was signed from 1. FC Köln and Philippe Cravero signed in from lower classed Etoile Carouge. Benjamin Huggel was signed in from local amateur club FC Münchenstein, however he had played the previous season on loan to FC Arlesheim in the fourth tier of Swiss football.

The Ivorian international Ahmed Ouattara, the young Brazilians Abedi and Argemiro Veiga were signed in from Sion. The transfers of Ouattara, Veiga, and Abedi (Robson Vicente Gonçalves) happened as part of a sudden, rushed "Blitzaktion" (lightning action) that moved multiple players between clubs at one time. The rushed deal move was finalised in a hectic, last-minute administrative flurry ahead of the season. The transfers faced complications primarily due to financial disputes and contractual wrangling involving Sion's contentious club management at the time. This was characterised by disputes over player registrations, unpaid wages, and fierce negotiations regarding transfer fees with club hierarchy. The Swiss Football Association (SFV/ASF) scrutinized the validity and clearance of multiple simultaneous transfers between the two rival clubs, delaying official eligibility for the start of the 1998–99 season. Because several players were shifted in a disorganized mass operation under tight deadlines, sorting out registrations, contractual details, and club clearances caused friction and delays at the start of the season.

In the other direction Adrian Knup, Daniel Salvi and Jürgen Hartmann all ended their football careers. Dario Zuffi returned to his club of origin Winterthur after having playing five years for the club. Jan Berger moved to Aarau and Maurizio Gaudino moved on to VfL Bochum. Further, youngster Alexander Frei was loaned out to second-tier Thun so that he could obtain more playing time.

=== Domestic League ===
The club's priority aim was to remain in the top flight of Swiss football. The season started fairly well, with five victories and three draws in the first ten rounds. However, seven defeats in the next nine rounds let the team slip down into the bottom areas of the table. Basel ende the qualification stage with eight victories, four draws and ten defeats, with just 21 goals scored and 34 conceded, with 28 points in sixth position in the league table. With this tally they were qualified for Champions Group for the second half of the season. The club's new aim was to aim for the European competitions, but, with an average second half of the season, winning five games, drawing four and losing five, Basel ended in the league tables fifth position and managed a position to qualify for the 1999 UEFA Intertoto Cup, but were nine points away from a slot for the European competitions. With four goals in the qualification round and six in the championship round Mario Frick was the team's top goal scorer.

=== Swiss Cup ===
All eyes were set on the cup season. But despite a draw against second-tier Stade Nyonnais, Basel's cup season came to an abrupt end, because they were unable to pass this hurdle, losing the match on penalties. Lausanne-Sport won the Swiss Cup final on 13 June 199 in the Wankdorf Stadium, winning 2–0 against Grasshopper Club.

== Players ==
=== Squad ===
The following is the list of the Basel first team squad. It includes all players that were in the squad the day the season started on 18 July 1998 but subsequently left the club after that date and it includes all players that transferred in during the season.

Note: Flags indicate national team as defined under FIFA eligibility rules; some limited exceptions apply. Players may hold more than one non-FIFA nationality.

No.	Pos.	Nation	Player
1	GK	SUI	Stefan Huber
2	DF	SUI	Massimo Ceccaroni
3	DF	SUI	Luís Calapes
4	DF	SUI	Theodoros Disseris (on loan to Winterthur)
5	DF	GER	Oliver Kreuzer
6	DF	SUI	Philippe Cravero
7	FW	LIE	Marco Pérez
8	MF	LIE	Mario Frick
9	MF	FRA	Fabrice Henry
10	MF	RUS	Aleksandr Rytchkov
11	FW	SUI	Deniz Mendi
12	DF	SUI	Sébastien Barberis
13	DF	SUI	Marco Tschopp
14	FW	RUS	Daniel Dobrovoljski

No.	Pos.	Nation	Player
15	DF	SUI	Ivan Reimann
17	MF	CZE	Václav Pěchouček
18	GK	SUI	Slaven Matan
19	MF	BRA	Fabinho
20	DF	SUI	Oumar Kondé (to Blackburn)
21	MF	BRA	Argemiro Veiga
22	MF	TUR	Atilla Sahin
23	DF	SUI	Benjamin Huggel
24	DF	BRA	Abedi
25	MF	CIV	Ahmed Ouattara
26	FW	SUI	Mario Cantaluppi
27	FW	SUI	Carlos Varela
28	DF	ROU	Dan Potocianu
29	FW	SUI	Urs Güntensperger
30	FW	TUR	Çetin Güner

=== Transfers in ===
Note: Flags indicate national team as defined under FIFA eligibility rules; some limited exceptions apply. Players may hold more than one non-FIFA nationality.

No.	Pos.	Nation	Player
6	DF	SUI	Philippe Cravero (from Etoile Carouge)
10	MF	RUS	Aleksandr Rytchkov (from 1. FC Köln)
21	MF	BRA	Argemiro Veiga (from Sion)
22	MF	TUR	Atilla Sahin (from SV Muttenz)
23	DF	SUI	Benjamin Huggel (from FC Arlesheim)
24	DF	BRA	Abedi (from Sion)

No.	Pos.	Nation	Player
25	MF	CIV	Ahmed Ouattara (from Sion)
26	FW	SUI	Mario Cantaluppi (from Servette)
27	FW	SUI	Carlos Varela (from Servette)
28	DF	ROU	Dan Potocianu (from Servette)
29	FW	SUI	Urs Güntensperger (from Lausanne-Sport)
30	FW	TUR	Çetin Güner (from Trabzonspor)

=== Transfers out ===
The following is the list of the FCB first team players that left the squad during the previous season or in the off-season, before the new domestic season began.

Note: Flags indicate national team as defined under FIFA eligibility rules; some limited exceptions apply. Players may hold more than one non-FIFA nationality.

No.	Pos.	Nation	Player
3	DF	SUI	Daniel Salvi (unknown, end of career)
7	FW	SUI	Dario Zuffi (to Winterthur)
10	MF	GER	Maurizio Gaudino (to VfL Bochum)
13	FW	SUI	Adrian Knup (retired, end of career)

No.	Pos.	Nation	Player
16	DF	GER	Jürgen Hartmann (retired end of career)
22	MF	BRA	Webber (Leandro Dos Santos) (unknown)
23	DF	SUI	Jan Berger (to Aarau)
27	FW	SUI	Alexander Frei (loaned out to Thun)

== Results ==
Legend

Win Draw Loss Postponed

=== Friendly matches ===
==== Pre- and mid-season ====
24 June 1998 Pre-season; Exhibition game	Sion (Switzerland)	0–1	(Switzerland) Basel	Stade St-Laurent, Saillon
14:30		FCB summary	25' (0:1) Kreuzer	Attendance: 300; Referee: (Switzerland) Claude Detruche (Thônex)
Note: Sion were without any regular starters except for Wolf and Ançay; Basel were without Cecaroni, Pechoucek, Sahin (all slightly injured), Fabinho (recovering from injury), as well as Perez and Dobrovoljski (both ill). Fair game, no cautions.

27 June 1998 Pre-season	Lausanne-Sport (Switzerland)	5–0	(Switzerland) Basel	Stade des Condémines, Sierre
18:00	Udovič 42' (1:0); Thurre 44' (2:0); Da Silva 57' (3:0); Rehn 60' (4:0); Celestini 65' (5:0)	FCB summary	(yellow card) 60' Rytchkov	Attendance: 500; Referee: (Switzerland) André Daina (Eclepens)
Note: Lausanne without Triki (absent) and Piffaretti (injured), but with a number of reserve players and test-player Da Silva. FCB without Fabinho, Ceccaroni, Cravero, Sahin, Henry (all injured), Gaspoz and Veiga (both not yet qualified), Perez and Dobrovoljski (both sick) and without Tabakovic (is under contract with Waldhof Mannheim until the end of June). 28 minute, N'Kufo substituted out with a laceration to his head. Shots from Mendi (63') and Frick (83') hit the crossbar.

4 July 1998 Pre-season	Basel (Switzerland)	2–3	(Turkey) Galatasaray	St. Jakob Stadium, Basel
19:00	Frick 4' (1:0); Rytchkov 64' (2:3)	FCB summary	11' (1:1) Şükür; 30' (pen. 1:2) Belözoğlu; 44' (1:3) Belözoğlu; (yellow card) 71' Kerimoglu	Attendance: 2,800; Referee: (Switzerland) Andreas Schluchter (Schönenbuch)
Note: FCB without Gaspoz, Veiga, and Gonçalves (due to a transfer dispute with FC Sion), as well as Ceccaroni, Fabinho, Sahin, and Dobrovoljski (all injured). Galatasaray without, among others, Hagi, Popescu, and Taffarel (all at the World Cup). 60th minute, a shot from Sukur hit the post. Corner kicks: 11-2 (8-2).

7 July 1998 Pre-season	Basel (Switzerland)	0–2	(Switzerland) Grasshopper Club	Sportplatz Nau, Laufen
19:00		FCB summary	81' (0:1) Tikva; 90' (0:2) Tikva	Attendance: 900; Referee: (Switzerland) Massimo Busacca (Monte Carasso/Bellinzona)
Note: FCB without Gaspoz, Veiga, and Gonçalves (transfer dispute with FC Sion), as well as Ceccaroni, Dobrovoljski, and Sahin (all injured). GC without Comisetti, Türkyilmaz, Nemsadze, and Esposito (all injured) and without Gämperle (not selected). Fair game, no cautions were issued.

10 July 1998 Pre-season	Basel (Switzerland)	1–1	(Germany) Karlsruher SC	St. Jakob Stadium, Basel
19:00	Tschopp 34' (1:0)	FCB summary	66' (1:1) Gilewicz	Attendance: 1,200; Referee: (Switzerland) Andreas Schluchter (Schönenbuch)
Note: FCB without Sahin, Cravero, and Fabinho (all injured), but fielded Brazilians Veiga and Gonçalvez from FC Sion for the first time; KSC coach Jörg Berger rested players including Buchwald and Régis. Fair game, no cautions were issued.

3 September 1998 Mid-season	Basel (Switzerland)	1–1	(France) RC Strasbourg	Stadion Rankhof, Basel
19:00	Rytchkov 27' (1:1)	FCB summary	16' (0:1) Bertin; (yellow card) 19' Beye; (yellow card) 81' Frank	Attendance: 1,000; Referee: (Switzerland) Andreas Schluchter (Schönenbuch)
Note: FCB without Hartmann, Henry, Ouattara, Sahin (all injured), Konde and Matan (both U-21). Strasbourg were without Vencel, Suchoparek, Amzine (away with national teams), Martins, Nielsen and Conteh (all injured).

9 October 1998 Mid-season	Basel (Switzerland)	0–4	(France) Olympique de Marseille	St. Jakob Stadium, Basel
19:00		FCB summary	18' (1:0) Ravanelli; 20' (2:0) Moses; 37' (0:3) Camara; 89' (0:4) Domoraud	Attendance: 3,000; Referee: (Switzerland) Urs Meier (Wettingen and Würenlos)
Note: FCB without Tschopp, Konde, Matan (all U-21) as well as Frick (international match with Liechtenstein) and Henry (injured), Marseille without Pires, Dugarry and Blanc (all national team), Maurice and Lemasson (both absent).

==== Winter break ====
20 January 1999 Winter break	Thun (Switzerland)	4–3	(Switzerland) Basel	Burgerallee, Thun
19:30	William 18' (1:0); Hatef 75' (pen. 2:3); Raimondi 89' (3:3); Simonjic 90' (4:3)	FCB summary	21' (1:1) Tschopp; 32' (1:2) Fabinho; 48' (1:3) Frick	Attendance: 350; Referee: (Switzerland) Jürg Burkhart
Note: Thun ohne Frei (Bänderdehnung), but with various reserve team players. FCB ohne Rytschkow (abwesend) und Cantaluppi (verletzt).

27 January 1999 Trainings camp	Martinique 11	2–2	(Switzerland) Basel	Stade Georges-Gratiant, Le Lamentin, Martinique
	Percin (yellow card) 45'; Rano 56' (1:1); Rano 86' (2:2)	FCB summary	5' (0:1) Fabinho; (yellow card) 34' Reimann; (yellow card) 45' Kreuzer; 62' (1:2) Tschopp	Attendance: 500; Referee: (France) André Elbène
Note: FCB without Veiga, Huggel and Cantaluppi (all injured); trialist Seedorf was not used. 44th minute: a header from Edmilson hit the post. - Corners: 3:5 (1:2).

21 January 1999 Trainings camp	Aiglon/U.S. Robert (Martinique)	0–1	(Switzerland) Basel	Stade Georges-Gratiant, Le Lamentin, Martinique
	St. Home (yellow card) 52'; Gibon (yellow card) 60'	FCB summary	(yellow card) 62' Sahin; 65' (0:1) Frick	Attendance: 350; Referee: (France) Guy Bellance
Note: FCB without Veiga, Huggel and Cantaluppi (all injured), Huber, Cravero (both rested) and Perez (ill).

1 February 1999 Trainings camp	Stade Spiritain (Martinique)	1–7	(Switzerland) Basel	Stade Municipal, Saint-Esprit, Martinique
	J.-P.Party 17' (1:0)	FCB summary	25' (1:1) Fabinho; 32' (1:2) Fabinho; 44' (1:3) Frick; 59' (1:4) Fabinho; 74' (1:5) Fabinho; 81' (1:6) Barberis; 85' (1:7) Mendi	Attendance: 1,000; Referee: (France) Alex Jacquens
Note: FCB without Veiga, Huggel, Cantaluppi (all injured) and Huber (rested).

10 February 1999 Winter break	SR Delémont (Switzerland)	0–0	(Switzerland) Basel	Parc des Sports, Delémont
19:00		FCB summary		Attendance: 50; Referee: (Switzerland) Stéphane Monaco
Note: FCB without Huggel, Veiga, Cantaluppi (all injured), Tschopp and Matan (both U-21). - Corners: 4:1 (2:1).

13 February 1999 Winter break	Étoile Carouge (Switzerland)	2–1	(Switzerland) Basel	Stade de la Fontenette, Carouge
	Goal	FCB summary	Reimann	Referee: (Switzerland) ?
Note: FCB reserves strengthened with players from the first team. At the same time the first team played another test match against FC Meyrin

13 February 1999 Winter break	FC Meyrin (Switzerland)	0–2	(Switzerland) Basel	Stade des Arbères, Meyrin
		FCB summary	(0:1) Mendi (0:2) Abedi	Referee: (Switzerland) ?
Note: Basel strengthened with FCB reserves. At the same time the reserve team played another friendly against Étoile Carouge

17 February 1999 Winter break	Eintracht Trier (Germany)	4–1	(Switzerland) Basel	Moselstadion, Trier
17:00	Thömmes 11' (1:0); Thömmes 31' (2:0); Melunović 43' (3:0); Papić 66' (4:1)	FCB summary	48' (3:1) Abedi	Attendance: 250; Referee: (Germany) Michael Herrmann
Note: FCB without Huber, Rytschkow, Veiga, Cantaluppi, Potocianu (all injured) and Fabinho (ill). 88th minute: Papic hits the post. Tschopp and Frick left the field with ankle injuries. Tschopp had to be taken to hospital.

25 March 1999 Mid-season	Basel (Switzerland)	0–0	(France) Sochaux	Stadion Rankhof, Basel
18:00		FCB summary	(yellow card) 62' Santini	Attendance: 300; Referee: (Switzerland) Andreas Schluchter (Schönenbuch)
Note: FCB played with two test goalkeepers Christian Sturm (U–19) und Davide Taini (FC Singen 04) each 45 minutes. Basel without Ceccaroni, Rytschkow, Kreuzer, Henry, Tschopp, Varela (all injured) as well as Huber, Frick and Matan (all with national team call-ups). 88th minute: a shot from Veiga hit the post.

31 March 1999 Mid-season	SC Dornach (Switzerland)	2–3	(Switzerland) Basel	Gigersloch, Dornach
18:00	Weidmann 25' (1:1); Manz 39' (2:2)	FCB summary	20' (0:1) Türk; 29' (1:2) Tschopp; 55' (2:3) Henry	Attendance: 200; Referee: (Switzerland) René Rogalla (Wallisellen)
Note: Dornach without Rudin, Ziparo, Schaub, Claude, Spagnolo, Sorg, Spicher, Wemans and Marty (all injured). Basel reinforced through various U-19 team players. Fair game, no cautions. Corners: 2:5 (0:3).

2 April 1999 Mid-season	SR Delémont (Switzerland)	1–0	(Switzerland) Basel	Sportplatz Nau, Laufen
18:00	Romano 37' (1:0)	FCB summary		Attendance: 450; Referee: (Switzerland) Markus Nobs (Wohlen bei Bern)
Note: FCB without Varela, Frick (rested), Rytschkow, Cantaluppi (injured), Ceccaroni and Henry (not in the squad). Tschopp subtituted in for the second half, left the field in the 68th minute injured.

=== Nationalliga A ===
==== Qualification phase ====
The first stage of the NLA began on 18 July 1998 and was completed on 13 December. The top eight teams in the qualification phase would advance to the championship group and the last four teams would play against relegation.

18 July 1998 Round 1	Basel	0–0	Sion	St. Jakob Stadium, Basel
19:30	Disseris (red card) 4'; Ceccaroni (yellow card) 24'	FCB summary	(yellow card) 22' Tholot; (yellow card) 61' Eydelie; (yellow card) 77' Lipawsky	Attendance: 9,000; Referee: (Switzerland) Philippe Leuba (Chexbres)
Note: FCB without Henry (injured), Cravero and Reimann (both suspended), as well as Veiga, Gonçalves, and Ouattara (all three ineligible). Sion were without Moret and Biaggi (both injured) and Bugnard (suspended). Frick was forced off injured at halftime. Red card in the 4th minute for Disseris with a professional foul.

21 July 1998 Round 2	Aarau	5–0	Basel	Stadion Brügglifeld, Aarau
19:30	Aleksandrov 8' (1:0); Ivanov 21' (2:0); Aleksandrov 51' (3:0); Aleksandrov 65' (4:0); Heldmann 70' (5:0); Zitola (yellow card) 87'	FCB summary FCA summary	(yellow card) 12' Pérez	Attendance: 5,900; Referee: (Switzerland) Reto Rutz (Amriswil)
Note: Aarau fielded their full squad. Basel were without Fabinho, Henry, Frick (all injured), Disseris, Reimann (suspended), Ouattara, Veiga, Abedi (all three not eligible) and Cravero (suspended and not eligible). Referee Reto Rutz's first top-tier match, good performance.

25 July 1998 Round 3	Basel	2–1	Zürich	St. Jakob Stadium, Basel
19:30	Tschopp (yellow card) 3'; Rytchkov 25' (1:0); Rytchkov (yellow card) 44'; Sahin 45' (2:0); Reimann (yellow card) 64'	FCZ summary FCB summary	(yellow card) 27' Sant'Anna; (yellow card) 30' Castillo; 64' (pen. 2:1) Sant'Anna; (yellow card) 82' Di Jorio	Attendance: 8,500; Referee: (Switzerland) Dieter Schoch (Attiswil)
Note: FCB without Frick, Henry, Fabinho (all injured), Disseris and Hartmann (not in the squad), Ouattara, Veiga, Abedi (all three not eligible). Zurich without Shorunmu, Brunner and Opango (all injured). 28th minute: a direct free-kick from Rychkov hit the post. 62nd minute: a shot from Rychkov hit the post.

1 August 1998 Round 4	Servette	3–1	Basel	Charmilles Stadium, Geneva
17:30	Juárez (yellow card) 9'; Rey 13' (pen. 1:0); Rey 19' (2:0); Rey 23' (3:0); Fournier (yellow card) 31'; Rey (yellow card) 59'	FCB summary	(yellow card) 35' Reimann; (yellow card) 68' Kreuzer; 84' (3:1) Abedi	Attendance: 4,100; Referee: (Switzerland) Roberto Ferrari
Note: Servette without Siljak, Ippoliti (both injured) and Pizzinat (suspended); Basel without Frick, Henry, Fabinho (all injured), Hartmann, Disseris (not in the squad), for the first time with Veiga, Ouattara and Gonçalves (qualified since the previous day).

9 August 1998 Round 5	Basel	1–0	Luzern	St. Jakob Stadium, Basel
16:15	Kondé (yellow card) 69'; Tschopp 75' (1:0)	FCB summary	(yellow card) 60' Moser; (yellow card) 82' Wyss	Attendance: 7,500; Referee: (Switzerland) Carlo Bertolini (Vira-Gambarogno)
Note: FCB without Frick, Henry, Fabinho and Matan (all injured). FCL were without M. Joller (suspended).

15 August 1998 Round 6	Basel	2–0	Xamax	St. Jakob Stadium, Basel
19:30	Ouattara 64' (pen. 1:0); Tschopp (yellow card) 82'; Kreuzer (yellow card) 90+2'; Pérez 90+5' (2:0)	FCB summary	(yellow card) 2' Njanka; (yellow card) 23' Wittl; (yellow card) 58' Rueda; (yellow card) 59' Zambaz	Attendance: 10,500; Referee: (Switzerland) Urs Meier (Wettingen and Würenlos)
Note: FCB without Frick, Henry, and Cravero (all injured). Xamax without Delay (injured). 14th minute: a shot from Abedi hit the crossbar. 67th minute: Quentin substitutes out with a leg injury. FCB debut for Fabinho (91st minute/substituted for Sahin).

23 August 1998 Round 7	St. Gallen	0–1	Basel	Espenmoos, St. Gallen
16:15	Hellinga (yellow card) 22'; Vurens (yellow card) 33'	FCB summary	(yellow card) 40' Kreuzer; (yellow card) 43' Kondé; 70' (0:1) Rytchkov; (yellow card) 72' Veiga; (yellow card) 75' Tschopp; (yellow card) 90+3' Reimann	Attendance: 9,700; Referee: (Switzerland) Dominique Tavel (Lonay)
Note: St. Gallen were without Sène and Zinna (injured). FCB without Frick, Henry (injured), Fabinho (in the youth academy), Disseris, Dobrovoljiski and Hartmann (not in the squad).

29 August 1998 Round 8	Basel	1–1	Grasshopper Club	St. Jakob Stadium, Basel
19:30	Ouattara 9' (1:0); Rytchkov (yellow card) 15'; Cravero (yellow card) 20'; Pérez (yellow card) 90+1'	FCB summary	(yellow card) 20' Vogel; (yellow card) 29' Tararache; (yellow card) 51' Nkufo; (yellow card) 62' Magnin; 70' (1:1) de Napoli	Attendance: 26,600; Referee: (Liechtenstein) Roland Beck (Triesenberg)
Note: FCB without Frick, Henry (both injured) and Tschopp (suspended). GC without Türkyilmaz (injured). 59th minute, a shot from De Napoli hit the top of the crossbar.

8 September 1998 Round 9	Lausanne-Sport	0–2	Basel	Olympique de la Pontaise, Lausanne
19:30	Celestini (yellow card) 24'; Piffaretti (yellow card) 34'	FCB summary	12' (0:1) Rytchkov; (yellow card) 18' (yellow-red card) 58' Kondé; (yellow card) 40' Reimann; (yellow card) 50' Rytchkov; (yellow card) 61' Ceccaroni; (red card) 64' Guy Mathez (head-coach, not on pitch); 69' (0:2) Rytchkov	Attendance: 5,900; Referee: (Switzerland) Massimo Busacca (Monte Carasso/Bellinzona)
Note: Lausanne were without Zetzmann (injured), N'Diaye, and Vardanyan (no residence permit). FCB without Matan, Henry (both injured), Disseris, Hartmann, Pechoucek, and Huggel (not in the squad). 64th minute, head-coach Guy Mathez was sent to the stands for continuous complaining.

12 September 1998 Round 10	Basel	1–1	Young Boys	St. Jakob Stadium, Basel
19:30	Ouattara (yellow card) 24'; Frick 57' (1:1); Barberis (yellow card) 77'	FCB summary	(yellow card) 21' Pintul; (yellow card) 33' Baumann; 40' (0:1) Bekirovski; (yellow card) 50' Bekirovski; (yellow card) 75' Kehrli	Attendance: 16,000; Referee: (Switzerland) André Daina (Eclepens)
Note: FCB without Konde, Reimann (both suspended) and Henry (injured); YB were without Malacarne (suspended) and Streun (injured). Sawu's 18th-minute goal was correctly disallowed due to a preceding foul. 59th minute, a shot from Bekirovski bounced off the crossbar.

19 September 1998 Round 11	Lugano	5–1	Basel	Cornaredo, Lugano
19:30	Gaspoz 18' (1:0); Wegmann (yellow card) 30'; Orlando 38' (2:0); Giménez 49' (3:0); Giménez 58' (4:0); Giallanza 87' (pen. 5:1)	FCB summary	74' (4:1) Rytchkov	Attendance: 4,380; Referee: (Switzerland) Markus Nobs (Wohlen bei Bern)
Note: Lugano without Pavlovic, Taborda (both injured), Tejeda (internally suspended), Andreoli (suspended), Rossi (ineligible to play); FCB without Ouattara (family reasons), Henry (injured), Disseris (suspended). 39th minute: a cross from Abedi, touched by Gaspoz, hit the crossbar.

27 September 1998 Round 12	Sion	1–0	Basel	Stade Tourbillon, Sion
16:15	Bertone (yellow card) 13'; Benson (yellow card) 24'; Tholot 37' (1:0); Tholot (yellow card) 40'; Allenspach (yellow card) 86'	FCB summary	(yellow card) 49' Kondé; (red card) 81' Veiga	Attendance: 6,900; Referee: (Switzerland) Dominique Tavel (Lonay)
Note: Sion were without Moret, Nichetti, Brown, Aziawonou (all injured) and Vanetta (suspended). FCB without Henry (injured), Mendi, Tabakovic and Hartmann (not in the squad). 81st minute, the red card for Veiga for a professional foul.

4 October 1998 Round 13	Basel	1–0	Aarau	St. Jakob Stadium, Basel
16:15	Ouattara 50' (1:0); Abedi (yellow card) 69'	FCB summary FCA summary	(yellow card) 55' Markovic	Attendance: 7,300; Referee: (Switzerland) Marcel Vollenweider (Rüti, Zürich)
Note: FCB without Konde, Veiga (both suspended), Henry, Huggel and Reimann (both injured); FCA with a full squad. 17-year-old junior international Mario Eggimann made his NLA debut for Aarau. Kreuzer was substituted out at halftime due to back problems. Sahin then played as libero.

16 October 1998 Round 14	Zürich	1–0	Basel	Letzigrund, Zürich
19:30	Fischer (yellow card) 26'; Sant'Anna (yellow card) 29'; Chassot 58' (1:0)	FCZ summary FCB summary	(yellow card) 10' Cravero; (yellow card) 27' Tschopp; (yellow card) 45' Frick; (yellow card) 59' Ouattara; (yellow card) 77' Calapes	Attendance: 11,300; Referee: (Liechtenstein) Roland Beck (Triesenberg)
Note: FCZ without Albrecht, Bamba, Brunner, Opango (all injured) and Shorunmu (recovering); FCB without Henry (injured). Tactical changes inside the FCB team, 74th minute: Perez in central midfield, Fabinho on the left. 84th minute: Perez on the right in midfield, Konde in the center and Cravero up front.

25 October 1998 Round 15	Basel	0–2	Servette	St. Jakob Stadium, Basel
16:15	Rytchkov (yellow card) 56'; Tschopp (yellow card) 87'	FCB summary	9' (0:1) Durix; 45' (0:2) Durix; (yellow card) 63' Juarez; (yellow card) 79' Varela	Attendance: 9,800; Referee: (Switzerland) Philippe Leuba (Chexbres)
Note: FCB without Konde, Henry, Disseris, and Hartmann (all injured); Servette were without Siljak, Salou, and Ouadja (all injured). 85th minute: a shot from Tschopp hit the underside of the crossbar and bounced back onto the pitch. 21st minute: Müller was substituted due to vision problems.

31 October 1998 Round 16	Luzern	4–1	Basel	Stadion Allmend, Luzern
17:30	Izzo (yellow card) 5'; Vukic (penalty missed) 11′ Koch 28' (1:1); Koch 53' (2:1); Brunner 60' (3:1) van Eck (yellow card) 71'; Moser 75' (4:1)	FCB summary	(yellow card) 11' Huber; 19' (0:1) Frick	Attendance: 7,960; Referee: (Switzerland) Carlo Bertolini (Vira-Gambarogno)
Note: FCL without Camenzind (suspended), Lehmann (injured), Koilov (ill) and Scepanovic (not in the squad); FCB without Rytschkow, Tschopp, Reimann (all suspended) and Henry (injured). 11th minute: Huber saved the penalty-kick from Vukic.

7 November 1998 Round 17	Xamax	3–1	Basel	Stade de la Maladière, Neuchâtel
17:30	N'Diaye 8' (1:0); N'Diaye (yellow card) 36'; Rueda (yellow card) 42'; Njanka (yellow card) 44'; Isabella 90' (2:1); N'Do 90+2' (3:1)	FCB summary	25' (1:1) Frick; (yellow card) 39' (yellow-red card) 42' Frick; (yellow card) 52' Tschopp	Attendance: 8,100; Referee: (Switzerland) Claude Detruche (Thônex)
Note: FCB without Henry, Mendi and Hartmann (both injured). 35th minute: a shot from Molist hit the post. 88th minute: a shot from Isabella bounced back onto thr pitch from the crossbar, the follow-up shot from Zambaz also hit the crossbar.

17 November 1998 Round 18	Basel	1–0	St. Gallen	St. Jakob Stadium, Basel
16:15	Tschopp 8' (1:0); Reimann (yellow card) 16'; Sahin (yellow card) 21'; Veiga (yellow card) 68'	Summary	(yellow card) 31' Zellweger; (yellow card) 35' Zinna	Attendance: 6,000; Referee: (Switzerland) Roberto Ferrari
Note: FCB without Frick (suspended), Henry and Mendi (both injured). St. Gallen without Vurens (suspended), Eugster (ill), Hellinga and Yakin (both injured). 3rd minute a shot from Tschopp hit the outside of the post. 33rd minute, Slavtschev substituted out with a hamstring strain.

21 November 1998 Round 19	Grasshopper Club	2–1	Basel	Hardturm, Zürich
17:30	Tikva 47' (1:0); Tararache (yellow card) 73'; Türkyilmaz 80' (2:0); Mazzarelli (yellow card) 90'	FCB summary	(yellow card) 73' Ceccaroni; 88' (2:1) Pérez	Attendance: 7,800; Referee: (Switzerland) Dominique Tavel (Lonay)
Note: GC were without De Napoli, Haas (injured), Christ, Magnin, and Smiljanic (suspended). FCB without Hartmann, Henry (injured), and Mendi (ill). Girondins Bordeaux coach Élie Baup was in the stands.

28 November 1998 Round 20	Basel	1–1	Lausanne-Sport	St. Jakob Stadium, Basel
17:30	Frick 3' (1:0); Rytchkov (yellow card) 49'; Reimann (yellow card) 61'; Barberis (yellow card) 67'; Ceccaroni (yellow card) 73'	FCB summary	(yellow card) 13' Iglesias; 31' (1:1) Pantelić; (yellow card) 62' Pantelić; (red card) 73' Thurre	Attendance: 5,900; Referee: (Liechtenstein) Roland Beck (Triesenberg)
Note: FCB without Hartmann and Henry (both injured). Lausanne without Londono and Diogo (both suspended), Celestini and Güntensperger (both injured). 33rd minute: a header from Pantelic hit the crossbar.

6 December 1998 Round 21	Young Boys	1–2	Basel	Wankdorf Stadium, Bern
14:30	Streun (yellow card) 67'; Sawu 69' (1:2)	FCB summary	6' (0:1) Rytchkov; (yellow card) 28' Kreuzer; (yellow card) 30' Veiga; (yellow card) 46' Smajić; 57' (0:2) Tschopp	Attendance: 5,300; Referee: (Switzerland) Urs Meier (Wettingen and Würenlos)
Note: YB without Drakopoulos (injured). FCB without Ceccaroni (suspended), Henry (injured) and Calapes (ill). 51st minute: a shot from Kehrli hit the crossbar. Debut for Benjamin Huggel.

13 December 1998 Round 22	Basel	1–3	Lugano	St. Jakob Stadium, Basel
16:15	Cravero (yellow card) 12'; Huber (red card) 29'; Frick (penalty missed) 44′ Tschopp 45' (pen. 1:0)	FCB summary	(yellow card) 19' Wegmann; (yellow card) 43' Hürzeler; (yellow card) 44' Tejeda; 72' (1:0) Wegmann; 79' (2:0) Wegmann; 80' Lombardo	Attendance: 34,745; Referee: (Switzerland) Reto Rutz (Amriswil)
Note: This was the last match in the St. Jakob Stadium before it was knocked down and replaced by the St. Jakob-Park. FCB without Kreuzer (suspended), Fabinho, Henry, Hartmann, and Veiga (all injured); Lugano without Gaspoz, Gimenez, Pavlovic, and Abatangelo (all injured). 44th minute: Lugano goalkeeper Erich Hürzeler saved the penalty-kick from Frick, Tschopp converted the retake. 52nd minute: a shot from Wegmann hit the post. 58th minute: a shot from Andreoli hit the crossbar.

==== Qualification table ====
Pos	Team	Pld	W	D	L	GF	GA	GD	Pts	Qualification
1	Servette	22	12	8	2	38	24	+14	44	Advance to championship round halved points (rounded up) as bonus
2	Grasshopper Club	22	11	5	6	37	25	+12	38	Advance to championship round halved points (rounded up) as bonus
3	Zürich	22	10	8	4	33	21	+12	38	Advance to championship round halved points (rounded up) as bonus
4	Lausanne-Sport	22	10	8	4	36	33	+3	38	Advance to championship round halved points (rounded up) as bonus
5	Xamax	22	7	11	4	30	23	+7	32	Advance to championship round halved points (rounded up) as bonus
6	Basel	22	8	4	10	21	34	−13	28	Advance to championship round halved points (rounded up) as bonus
7	Luzern	22	6	9	7	26	25	+1	27	Advance to championship round halved points (rounded up) as bonus
8	St. Gallen	22	7	6	9	31	31	0	27	Advance to championship round halved points (rounded up) as bonus
9	Sion	22	5	8	9	22	36	−14	23	Continue to promotion/relegation round
10	Lugano	22	5	7	10	35	43	−8	22	Continue to promotion/relegation round
11	Young Boys	22	4	7	11	33	34	−1	19	Continue to promotion/relegation round
12	Aarau	22	3	7	12	28	41	−13	16	Continue to promotion/relegation round

Source: rsssf.com
Rules for classification: 1) points; 2) goal difference; 3) number of goals scored.

==== Championship round ====
The first eight teams of the qualification phase competed in the Championship round. The teams took half of the points (rounded up to complete units) gained in the qualification as bonus with them. This phase began on 28 February 1999 and was completed on 2 June.

28 February 1999 Round 1	Luzern	0–2	Basel	Stadion Allmend, Luzern
16:15	Scepanovic (yellow card) 21'; Koch (yellow card) 73'; Knez (yellow card) 71' (yellow-red card) 83'	FCB summary	33' (0:1) (yellow card) 29' Abedi; (yellow card) 49' Barberis; 89' (0:2) Frick	Attendance: 7,930; Referee: (Switzerland) Urs Meier (Wettingen and Würenlos)
Note: FCL without Arnold (not yet eligible to play), Lehmann, Rojko (both injured) and Brunner (ill). FCB without Veiga, Potocianu, Rytschkow, Tschopp and Cantaluppi (all injured) as well as Henry (not in the squad).

7 March 1999 Round 2	Basel	1–0	Xamax	Stadion Schützenmatte, Basel
14:30	Cravero (yellow card) 5'; Abedi 36' (1:0); Kreuzer (yellow card) 38'; Barberis (yellow card) 46'	FCB summary	(yellow card) 26' Simo; (red card) 53' Njanka	Attendance: 4,250; Referee: (Liechtenstein) Roland Beck (Triesenberg)
Note: FCB without Rytschkow, Veiga, Cantaluppi, Potocianu and Tschopp (all injured). Xamax were without Corminboeuf, Delay, Colomba, Martinovic, Gazic and Gämperle (all injured) and Quentin (suspended).

13 March 1999 Round 3	Servette	2–1	Basel	Charmilles Stadium, Geneva
19:30	Wolf 34' (1:0); Rey 38' (2:0)	FCB summary	(yellow card) 20' Henry; (yellow card) 60' Varela; (yellow card) 61' (yellow-red card) 90' Ceccaroni; 71' (2:1) Fabinho	Attendance: 6,657; Referee: (Switzerland) Philippe Leuba (Chexbres)
Note: Servette were without Ouadja (suspended), Barea, Ippoliti and Siljak (all injured). FCB without Cravero, Barberis (both suspended), Rytschkow, Veiga and Cantaluppi (all injured).

21 March 1999 Round 4	Basel	1–0	Zürich	Stadion Schützenmatte, Basel
14:30	Cravero (yellow card) 8'; Varela (yellow card) 29'; Pérez 51' (pen. 1:0); Calapes (yellow card) 52'; Cantaluppi (yellow card) 62'	FCZ summary FCB summary	(yellow card) 24' (yellow-red card) 45' Di Jorio; (yellow card) 58' Wiederkehr	Attendance: 7,500; Referee: (Switzerland) Carlo Bertolini (Vira-Gambarogno)
Note: FCB without Ceccaroni (suspended), Fabinho (ill), Rytschkow (returned from Siberia), Tschopp, Veiga and Henry (all injured). FCZ without Del Signore and Djordjevic (both injured).

5 April 1999 Round 5	Grasshopper Club	4–2	Basel	Hardturm, Zürich
16:15	de Napoli 5' (1:0) de Napoli 6' (2:0); Tikva 11' (3:0) de Napoli 52' (4:0); Comisetti (yellow card) 57'	FCB summary	(yellow card) 58' Barberis; (yellow card) 59' Fabinho; 79' (4:1) Varela; 90+1' (4:2) Frick	Attendance: 10,500; Referee: (Switzerland) Dominique Tavel (Lonay)
Note: GC without Vogel (suspended), Tararache, Walker (both injured), Mazzarelli and Türkyilmaz (both released). FCB without Rytschkow (not fit), Cantaluppi, Henry, and Tschopp (all injured).

10 April 1999 Round 6	Basel	1–2	Lausanne-Sport	Stadion Schützenmatte, Basel
19:30	Calapes (yellow card) 36'; Frick 60' (1:2)	FCB summary	(yellow card) 6' Thurre; 12' (0:1) Gerber; 54' (o.g. 0:2) Kreuzer; (yellow card) 73' Puce; (yellow card) 83' Hänzi	Attendance: 5,315; Referee: (Switzerland) Dieter Schoch (Attiswil)
Note: FCB without Cravero, Cantaluppi and Rytschkow (all injured). Lausanne without Brunner (injured).

18 April 1999 Round 7	Basel	3–3	St. Gallen	Stadion Schützenmatte, Basel
16:15	Frick 56' (1:1); Cantaluppi 58' (pen. 2:1); Henry (yellow card) 64'; Kreuzer 79' (3:2); Barberis (yellow card) 90+4'	FCB summary	(yellow card) 30' Thüler; (yellow card) 42' Hellinga; 45' (0:1) Contini; (yellow card) 60' Tsawa; (red card) 60' Koller (head-coach, not on pitch); 70' (2:2) Müller; (yellow card) 90' Gil; 90+5' (3:3) Jairo	Attendance: 4,057; Referee: (Switzerland) Claude Detruche (Thônex)
Note: FCB without Rytschkow (ill) and Reimann (suspended), Ceccaroni and Mendi (not in the squad). Urs Güntensperger made his team debut. St. Gallen without Zwyssig, Dal Santo and Eugster (all injured). 31 minute, a shot from Varela hit the crossbar. 40th minute, a shot from Contini hit the post. 60th minute, St. Gallen coach Koller banished to the stands after complaining. 61st minute, a headed goal from Kreuzer disallowed. 62nd minute, a shot from Jairo hit the crossbar.

25 April 1999 Round 8	St. Gallen	1–2	Basel	Espenmoos, St. Gallen
16:00	Pinelli (yellow card) 23'; Damasio 72' (1:0)	FCB summary	(yellow card) 13' Cantaluppi; (penalty missed) 43′ Cantaluppi; (yellow card) 44' Potocianu; 75' (1:1) Frick; (yellow card) 81' Cravero; 90+2' (1:2) Pérez; (yellow card) 90+2' Varela	Attendance: 7,800; Referee: (Switzerland) André Daina (Eclepens)
Note: St. Gallen head-coach Marcel Koller not on bench (suspended), also without Hellinga (suspended), Dal Santo, Eugster, and Zwyssig (all injured), as well as Zinna (with the U-17 national team). FCB without Reimann (suspended), Rytschkow (recovering), Mendi, Pechoucek, and Güntensperger (all not in the squad). 43rd minute, the penalty kick from Cantaluppi hit the left post and bounced out of play.

1 May 1999 Round 9	Lausanne-Sport	3–0	Basel	Olympique de la Pontaise, Lausanne
19:30	Puce 13' (1:0) (Barberis) 31' (o.g. 2:0); Gerber 67' (3:0)	FCB summary	(yellow card) 40' Varela; (yellow card) 53' Cantaluppi; (yellow card) 89' Tschopp	Attendance: 6,100; Referee: (Liechtenstein) Roland Beck (Triesenberg)
Note: Lausanne were without Celestini (suspended). FCB without Potocianu (suspended), Güntensperger, Rytschkow (both injured) and Güner (ineligible).

8 May 1999 Round 10	Basel	2–0	Grasshopper Club	Stadion Schützenmatte, Basel
19:30	Rytchkov (yellow card) 1'; Potocianu (yellow card) 26'; Kreuzer (yellow card) 44' (yellow-red card) 50'; Fabinho 54' (1:0); Tschopp 90' (2:0); Tschopp (yellow card) 90'	FCB summary	(yellow card) 17' Haas; (yellow card) 17' Smiljanić; (yellow card) 20' Tararache; (red card) 44' Vogel; (yellow card) 87' Müller	Attendance: 5,460; Referee: (Switzerland) Dominique Tavel (Lonay)
Note: FCB without Varela (suspended), Güntensperger and Perez (both injured). National coach Gilbert Gress in the stands. 28th minute: Mikheil Kavelashvili taken to hospital with a laceration. 40th minute: a lob ball from Frick hit the post.

16 May 1999 Round 11	Zürich	2–1	Basel	Letzigrund, Zürich
16:15	Sant'Anna (yellow card) 45'; Castillo 78' (1:1); Bartlett 83' (2:1); Jamarauli (yellow card) 90+3'	FCZ summary FCB summary	(yellow card) 13' (yellow-red card) 61' Cantaluppi; (yellow card) 29' Rytchkov; 34' (0:1) Frick; (yellow card) 45' Potocianu; (yellow card) 80' Sahin	Attendance: 12,300; Referee: (Switzerland) Massimo Busacca (Monte Carasso/Bellinzona)
Note: FCB club president René C. Jäggi dimissed coach Guy Mathez directly before the match. Marco Schällibaum was installed as coach ad interim and took his place on the bench. FCB were without Kreuzer, Varela (both suspended), Cravero, Güntensperger, Henry and Pechoucek (all injured) as well as Güner (ineligible). FCZ without Lima (suspended), Brunner, Del Signore and Opango (all injured). 47th minute, a goal from Bartlett was disallowed because of an offside.

22 May 1999 Round 12	Basel	0–0	Servette	Stadion Schützenmatte, Basel
19:30	Potocianu (yellow card) 13'; Sahin (yellow card) 41'; Varela (yellow card) 50'; Rytchkov (yellow card) 57'	FCB summary	(yellow card) 31' Barea; (yellow card) 86' Rey; (yellow card) 90' Vurens	Attendance: 5,490; Referee: (Switzerland) Carlo Bertolini (Vira-Gambarogno)
Note: FCB without Cantaluppi (suspended), Ceccaroni, Cravero, Pechoucek, and Güntensperger (all injured), as well as Reimann (ill) and Güner (ineligible). Servette were without Fournier, Jeanneret, Leroy, Ippoliti, and Siljak (all injured). Christian Gross (former Tottenham manager) was among the spectators. 22nd minute, Kreuzer left the field with a broken nose and taken to hospital after a collision with Petrov.

30 May 1999 Round 13	Xamax	1–1	Basel	Stade de la Maladière, Neuchâtel
16:15	Isabella 16' (1:0); N'Diaye (yellow card) 37'	FCB summary	(yellow card) 22' (yellow-red card) 90+3' Potocianu; (yellow card) 39' Ceccaroni; 54' (1:1) Fabinho	Attendance: 5,500; Referee: (Switzerland) Nicole Petignat (Courgenay)
Note: Xamax were without Corminboeuf, Colomba, Alicarte, Quentin, Martinovic, Gämperle, and Gazic (all injured). FCB without Rytschkow, Sahin (both suspended), Kreuzer, Calapes, Cantaluppi, Cravero, Frick, Pechoucek, and Güntensperger (all injured), as well as Güner (ineligible). Referee Nicole Mouidi-Petignat made her NLA debut. 75th minute, a shot from Gonçalves hit the crossbar.

2 June 1999 Round 14	Basel	0–0	Luzern	Stadion Schützenmatte, Basel
20:15	Cantaluppi (yellow card) 60'	FCB summary	(yellow card) 39' Scepanovic	Attendance: 3,830; Referee: (Switzerland) Roberto Ferrari
Note: FCB without Rychkov and Potocianu (both suspended) as well as Kreuzer, Calapes, Barberis, Frick, Pechoucek and Güntensperger (all injured). FCL without Lubamba, Knez, Daniel Joller and Lehmann (all injured). This was referee Roberto Ferrari's last match before his retirement. 56th minute: a headed ball from Mendi hit the crossbar. 83rd minute: a shot from Scepanovic hit the post.

==== Final league table ====
Pos	Team	Pld	W	D	L	GF	GA	GD	BP	Pts	Qualification
1	Servette	14	7	3	4	19	14	+5	22	46	Swiss champions, qualified for Champions League third qualifying round
2	Grasshopper Club	14	8	3	3	31	11	+20	19	46	qualified for UEFA Cup qualifying round
3	Lausanne-Sport	14	8	2	4	28	20	+8	19	45	Swiss Cup winners, qualified for UEFA Cup first round
4	Zürich	14	7	2	5	24	15	+9	19	42	qualified for UEFA Cup qualifying round
5	Basel	14	5	4	5	18	19	−1	14	33	qualified for Intertoto Cup first round
6	Xamax	14	2	6	6	12	27	−15	16	28	qualified for Intertoto Cup first round
7	Luzern	14	4	2	8	13	27	−14	14	28	
8	St. Gallen	14	2	4	8	13	25	−12	14	24	

Source: rsssf.com
Rules for classification: 1) points; 2) Position in the qualification.

=== Swiss Cup ===
21 February 1999 Round 5	Stade Nyonnais	2–2 (a.e.t.) (4–2 p)	Basel	Colovray, Nyon
14:30	Oliveira (yellow card) 10' (yellow-red card) 82'; Margarini (yellow card) 37' (Ceccaroni) 44' (o.g.); Aubert 52' (1:2); Bridy (yellow card) 62'	Summary	22' (o.g.) (Poulard); (yellow card) 34' Ceccaroni; 67' (2:2) Frick	Attendance: 622; Referee: (Switzerland) Marcel Vollenweider (Rüti, Zürich)
	Penalties
	Vernaz (penalty scored); Carrasco (penalty missed); Ostermann (penalty scored); Martin (penalty scored); De Siebenthal (penalty scored)		(penalty missed) Frick; (penalty scored) Cravero; (penalty scored) Kreuzer; (penalty missed) Sahin
Note: FCB without Rytschkow, Tschopp, Veiga, Cantaluppi, Potocianu (all injured), Fabinho (ill) and Huber (suspended). 20th minute, Varela was substituted out injured. Corners: 6:5

== See also ==
- History of FC Basel
- List of FC Basel players
- List of FC Basel seasons

== Sources ==
- Rotblau: Jahrbuch Saison 2015/2016. Publisher: FC Basel Marketing AG. ISBN 978-3-7245-2050-4
- Rotblau: Jahrbuch Saison 2017/2018. Publisher: FC Basel Marketing AG. ISBN 978-3-7245-2189-1
- Die ersten 125 Jahre / 2018. Publisher: Josef Zindel im Friedrich Reinhardt Verlag, Basel. ISBN 978-3-7245-2305-5
- 1998–99 at Joggeli.ch
- 1998–99 at RSSSF
