= Argemiro Veiga =

Brazilian footballer (born 1972)

Personal information
- Full name: Argemiro Veiga Gonçalves
- Date of birth: 30 August 1972 (age 54)
- Place of birth: Ubiratã, Brazil
- Height: 1.74 m (5 ft 9 in)
- Position: Midfielder

Youth career
- –1992: Coritiba

Senior career*
Years	Team	Apps	(Gls)
1993–1994	Coritiba		
1995–1997	Joinville		
1997–1998	FC Sion	30	(0)
1998–1999	FC Basel	27	(0)
1999–2000	Le Havre	1	(0)
1999	→ Servette (loan)	10	(0)
2000–2003	Monterrey		
2002	→ América (loan)		
2003	Atlas		
2004	Santos Laguna		
2004–2005	Monterrey		
2005	San Luis		
2006	Tigres		
2006–2007	Joinville		
2007–2009	Coritiba		
- * Club domestic league appearances and goals

Argemiro Veiga Gonçalves (born 30 August 1972), better known as Argemiro Veiga, is a Brazilian former footballer who played as a midfielder in the 1990s and 2000.

== Career ==
=== Early years ===
Veiga played his youth football at Coritiba and advanced to the second team in 1992. In January 1994 he advanced to their first team, who had just won promotion from the second tier. He played in the 1993 Campeonato Brasileiro Série A, but at the end of the season the team suffered relegation. Veiga stayed with the team for another season. After these two seasons he transferred to Joinville and stayed with them for three seasons.

=== Sion ===
In January 1997 club FC Sion's owner and president Christian Constantin persuaded Veiga to transfer to Switzerland. He signed a three-year contract and joined Sion's first team under head coach Alberto Bigon for the second half of the 1996–97 league season. Veiga played in all fourteen games in the championship stage, the team rose from third position in the table to become Swiss champions, three points clear of their nearest rival. In the 1997–98 Swiss Cup the team advanced to the final, winning this against Luzern 5–4 in penalties after a three all draw after extra time. Veiga remained with the club for the following season, but the team could not defend either of their two titles.

=== Basel ===
In a lightning strike action, a number of players were transferred from Sion to Basel in advance of the 1998–99 season. The action was initiated by Christian Constantin, the FCS President, and these were namely Robson Vicente Gonçalves called Abedi, Ahmed Ouattara and Veiga himself. They joined FCB's first team for their 1998–99 season under head coach Guy Mathez. After playing in one test game, Veiga played his domestic league debut for the club in the away game in the Charmilles Stadium on 1 August 1998 as Basel were defeated 3–1 by Servette. Towards the end of the match on 27 September 1998 against Sion Veiga was shown the red card for pulling the 'emergency brake' to stop an opponent striker was running away at goal.

Despite the afore mentioned mishap, thanks to his stupendous ball handling and his intuitive style of play during the entire season, Veiga was one of the best Basel players that season. But then it happened, as often happens in football. A new club from abroad came around waving additional banknotes, in an attempt to persuade a player to switch. In this case it was Le Havre AC. They offered Veiga twice what he could have earned at Basel. FCB let him go for a fee of $1.5 million. During his time with the club, Veiga played a total of 33 games for Basel without scoring a goal. 27 of these games were in the Swiss Super League and six were friendly games.

=== Le Havre, Servette ===
Veiga joined Le Havre, in advance of the 1999–2000 French Division 1, season under head coach Francis Smerecki. However, barely had Veiga arrived, he was loaned out, back to Switzerland, to Servette for six months. Following the loan period, during the second half of the season he had only one appearance for the team, who suffered relegation at the end of the campaign.

=== Mexico ===
Leaving Europe during the summer of 2000, Veiga moved to Mexico. He first played for northern Mexican club Monterrey as a regular starter. On 1 July 2002, he was loaned out to Club América, but without having played a game, he returned to Monterrey one month later. In January 2003 he moved on to play for Atlas, based in Guadalajara in the west of the country. Another year later he transferred to Santos Laguna, but he stayed with them for just six months. On 1 July 2004, he re-joined Monterrey for another year. Then Veiga moved on to play six months for San Luis before he moved on again. He joined Tigres UANL, where he also stayed just six months, and this was his last stint in Mexico.

=== The later years ===
Returning to Brazil, Veiga re-joined Joinville in July 2006, where he stayed for about ten months. In May 2007 Veiga returned to his club of origin Coritiba. Here Veiga was able to pass on his footballing experience from years abroad to young, hopeful teammates. To the beginning of 2009 he retired from his active football career.

== Personal life ==
Following his playing career across Brazil, Switzerland, France, and Mexico, Veiga transitioned to the private sector. As of June 2016, he resided with his partner and daughter in Paraná, Brazil, working in the agricultural transport sector.

== Honours ==
Sion

- Swiss Super League: 1996–97
- Swiss Cup: 1996–97

== Sources ==
- Die ersten 125 Jahre. Publisher: Josef Zindel im Friedrich Reinhardt Verlag, Basel. ISBN 978-3-7245-2305-5
- Verein "Basler Fussballarchiv" Homepage
