= Carlos Varela (Spanish footballer) =

Spanish footballer (born 1977)

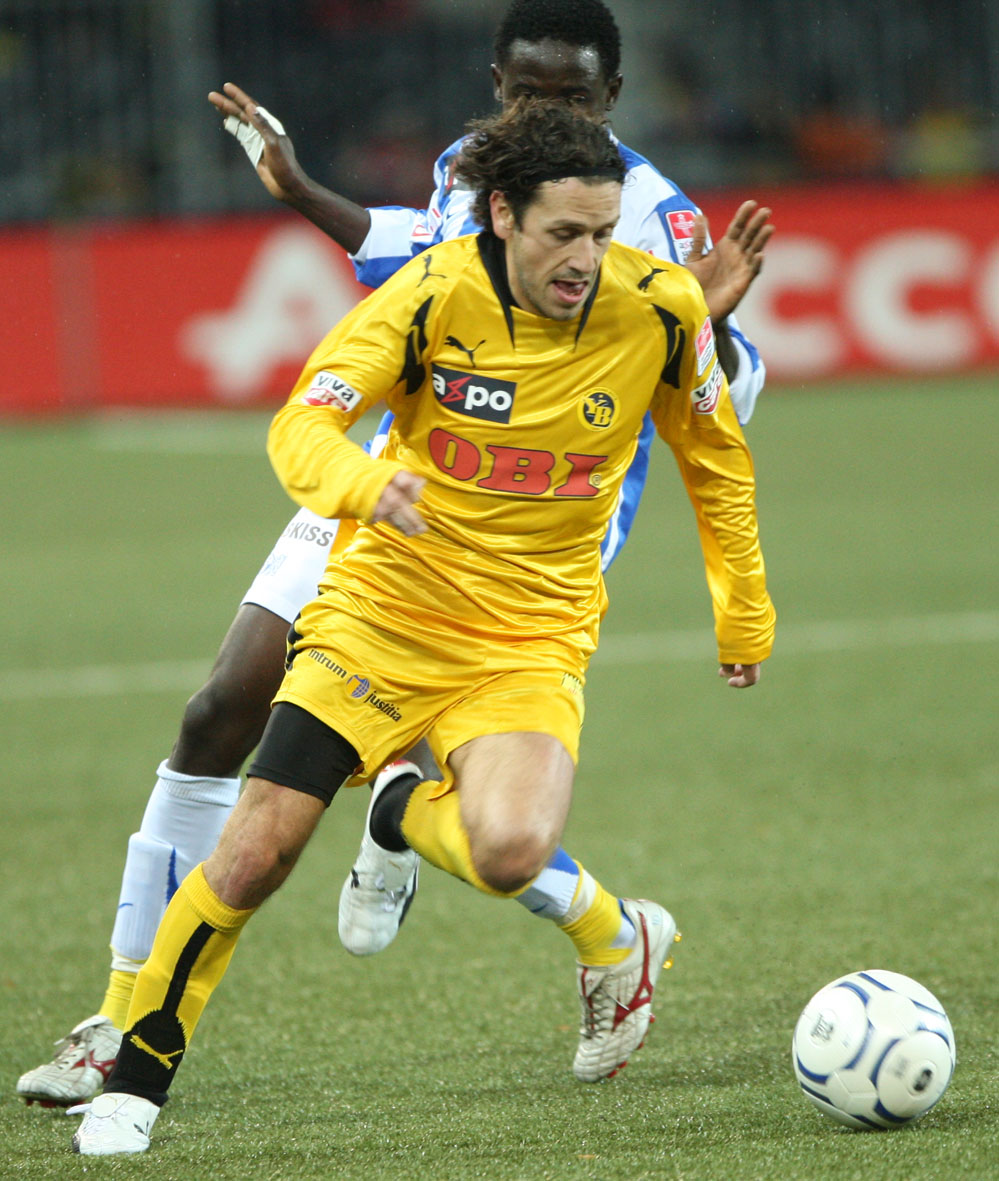

Personal information
- Full name: Carlos Varela
- Date of birth: 15 September 1977 (age 49)
- Place of birth: Geneva, Switzerland
- Height: 1.77 m (5 ft 10 in)
- Position: Midfielder

Youth career
- –1993: FC Vernier
- 1993–1995: Servette

Senior career*
Years	Team	Apps	(Gls)
1995–2000	Servette	86	(14)
1999	→ Basel (loan)	12	(1)
2000–2004	Basel	86	(6)
2003–2005	→ Aarau (loan)	49	(9)
2005–2009	Young Boys	111	(16)
2009–2010	Neuchâtel Xamax	30	(4)
2010	D.C. United	6	(0)
2011	Servette	5	(1)
2011	FC Wohlen	2	(0)
2011–2016	FC Köniz		
- * Club domestic league appearances and goals

Carlos Vila Varela (born 15 September 1977) is a Spanish former footballer who played as a midfielder. He spent almost his entire football career in Switzerland.

== Career ==
=== Early years ===
Born in Geneva, Switzerland, Varela played his youth football with local amateur club FC Vernier as he was scouted by Servette and he joined their youth department in 1993. He advanced from their M-17 team straight in to their first team, who played in the Swiss National League A, in the summer of 1995. As 18-year-old he only had two appearances in the 1995–96 Nationalliga A that season, but he also had appearances for their U-21 team. During the 1996–97 season he had 16 appearances for the first team and scored his first league goal.

=== Breakthrough ===
Varela worked his way up in Servette's first team, to becoming a regular starter and regular goal scorer. In the 1997–98 season he had 21 appearances and scored four league goals, as the team ended the season in third position. Then during the winter break of the 1998–99 season, after he had played 18 league matches and scoring six goals, he was loaned out to FC Basel. He joined Basel's first team during their 1998–99 season under head coach Guy Mathez. After playing in just one test game Varela played his debut for the club in the away game in the Swiss Cup on 21 February 1999 as Basel were surprisingly defeated 4–2 on penalties by lower tier Stade Nyonnais. He played his domestic league debut for them one week later in the away game in the Stadion Allmend as Basel won 2–0 against Luzern. He scored his first goal with the team on 5 April in the away game as Basel were defeated 4–2 by Grasshopper Club. He had 12 appearances with Basel, scoring just that one goal, during his loan period.

Servette won the championship at the end of the 1998–99 season and, because he had played the first half of the season with them, Varela was also awarded the gold medal. Following his six month loan, Varela returned to play for Servette during the 1999–2000 season and he had another successful time with them, 30 appearances and five goals. However, they could not defend their championship title and ended the season in sixth position in the table.

=== Basel ===
His contract with Servette expired and he left the club, signing a definitive transfer to FC Basel under head coach Christian Gross for their 2000–01 season and Varela immediately became regular starter with them. Basel started somewhat irregularly into the season, a number of high scoring games, three victories, three defeats. They then gathered themselves and climbed to the top of the table. However, four defeats in the last five games, through them back to fifth position, at the end of the qualifying stage. Basel were able to play their home games of the championship group in their new stadium, the St. Jakob-Park which opened on 15 March 2001 and it was sold out with 33,433 spectators on three occasions. However, in the second half of the season, the team played eight draws in their 14 matches and so ended the season in fourth position. Varela had 31 appearances, scoring three goals. Basel joined the 2000–01 UEFA Cup in the qualifying round, advancing with a 12–1 aggregate win over Folgore from San Marino and then a 7–6 aggregate victory over Norwegian Brann to the second round. However, here they lost their goal scoring qualities and were knocked out 3–1 on aggregate by Feyenoord. Varela played in all six games, but did not net a goal.

Basel played in the 2001 UEFA Intertoto Cup. In the second leg of the semi-final on 1 August in the Stade Olympique de la Pontaise Varela scored the equaliser as Basel drew 2–2 with Lausanne-Sport, as they won 5–2 on aggregate to advance to the final. However here they were defeated by Aston Villa. The league season started in the worst possible way. In their first game away against FC Sion, Basel suffered a humiliating 8–1 defeat. But Basel ended the qualification as league leaders, five points ahead of Lugano. Basel started well into the second part of the season and during this period FCB played their best football, pulling away at the top of the table and subsequently achieved the championship title prematurely. Basel won the last game of the season, on 8 May 2002, and became champions ten points clear at the top of the table. Just four days later they played in the cup final against Grasshopper Club winning 2–1 in extra time, winning the double. Varela had 30 league appearances, scoring two goals, and five cup appearances, scoring once.

Basel's 2002–03 UEFA Champions League season started in the second qualifying round. After beating Žilina 4–1 on aggregate and Celtic on the away goals rule after a 3–3 aggregate, Basel advanced to the group stage. They ended this in second position behind Valencia, but ahead of Liverpool and Spartak Moscow to advance to the second group stage. They ended this in third position behind Manchester United and Juventus, but ahead of Deportivo La Coruña. Varela played in 10 of these 16 matches. Basel ended their league season as runners-up, but in the cup they advanced to the final and here they beat Xamax 6–0 to defend the title that they had won a season earlier. Varela played in 25 of the 36 league matches, scoring once, and in four of the five cup games.

To the beginning of the 2003–04 league season Basel loaned Varela for a year within the Super League to Aarau. The two clubs agreed on this, and in return, FCB took over the 20-year-old midfielder/striker David Degen from FCA, also on a one-year loan. Varela scored six goals in 28 appearances. Consequently, the loan contract was extended for a second year, and in the 2004–05 season he scored three goals in 21 appearances. Varelas's contract expired then, and he transferred out. During his time with the club in 1999 and again from 2000 to 2003, Varela played a total of 181 games for Basel scoring a total of 13 goals. 98 of these games were in the Swiss Super League, 12 in the Swiss Cup, 23 in the UEFA competitions (Champions League, UEFA Cup and UIC) and 48 were friendly games. He scored seven goals in the domestic league, one in the cup, one in the European games and the other four were scored during the test games. During this period he had also been shown the yellow card 37 times and the red card once.

=== Young Boys ===
In the summer of 2005, Varela signed for Young Boys and immediately became regular starter for them as well. For YB he scored 16 league goals in 111 appearances in four seasons. Varela was also known for his emotional outbursts, this was shown again in the 2008–09 season, after just the first three games he already had three warnings and one dismissal (directly red). At the end of that season his contract was not extended.

=== Xamax ===
In the summer of 2009 Varela signed a two-year contract with Xamax, and he scored three goals in that season. Soon after the start of the 2010–11 season (four games) he received a three match ban from the Swiss Football Association for unsportsmanlike conduct against a linesman and a day later he cancelled his contract with the club and became free agent.

=== Later years ===
He then went on trial for D.C. United in the United States. After a lengthy trial, Varela eventually signed with D.C. United, a professional soccer club based in Washington, D.C., on 14 September 2010, but he never broke into the team.

In January 2011 he joined Swiss club Servette FC for the third time in his career. Servette at that time played in the Challenge League, the second tier of Swiss football. At the end of the season they won promotion by being second position in the division and winning the play-off match 3–2 on aggregate against Bellinzona. At the beginning of the 2011–12 season Servette announced that they were no longer planning with him, therefore, as free agent again, he signed for FC Wohlen, but left again after just three games (two in the Challenge League one in the Cup) and joined FC Köniz, where he ended his active football career in 2016.

== Honours ==
Servette

- Swiss Super League: 1998–99
- Promotion from the Challenge League: 2010–11

FC Basel

- Swiss Super League: 2002
- Swiss Cup: 2003
- Uhrencup: 2003

Young Boys

- Uhrencup: 2007
