= Ahmed Ouattara =

Ivorian former footballer (born 1969)

Personal information
- Date of birth: 15 December 1969 (age 56)
- Place of birth: Abidjan, Ivory Coast
- Position: Striker

Senior career*
Years	Team	Apps	(Gls)
1989–1994	Africa Sports		
1994–1998	Sion	54	(27)
1995–1997	→ Sporting CP (loan)	20	(5)
1998–1999	Basel	17	(3)
1999	Extremadura	7	(1)
1999–2000	Al Shabab		
2000–2001	Salgueiros	8	(1)
2001–2002	ASEC Mimosas		
Total		106	(37)

International career
1989–1999	Ivory Coast	21	(4)
- * Club domestic league appearances and goals

Ahmed Ouattara (born 15 December 1969) is an Ivorian former footballer who played as a striker. He competed professionally, other than in his country, in Switzerland, Portugal, Spain and the United Arab Emirates.

== Club career ==
Born in Abidjan, Ouattara started his career with Africa Sports National, remaining five years with the club after which he signed for FC Sion in Switzerland. He scored a career-best 17 goals in 30 games in the 1997–98 season, but his team could only rank seventh out of 12 in the Swiss Super League. After a loan period by Sporting CP he returned to Switzerland.

Ouattara joined Basel's first team for their 1998–99 season under head coach Guy Mathez. Ouattara played his domestic league debut for his new club in the away game in the Charmilles Stadium on 1 August 1998 as Basel were defeated 0–3 by Servette. He scored his first goal for his club on 15 August in the home game in the St. Jakob Stadium against Xamax as Basel won 2–0. The goal was scored from the penalty point. During the winter break of that season, Ouattara moved to Spain. During his short time with the club he played a total of 18 games for Basel scoring a total of three goals. 17 of these games were in the Nationalliga A and the other was a friendly game. He scored all three goals in the domestic league.

During 13 years as a professional he also played for CF Extremadura, Al Shabab Al Arabi Club, S.C. Salgueiros and ASEC Mimosas.

Ouattara appeared at the Europe XI v Africa XI friendly game in 1997.

== International career ==
Ouattara was a member of the Ivorian national side between 1989 and 1999. He scored four goals in 21 caps, which included three FIFA World Cup qualification games. He was part of the Africa Cup of Nations squads in 1994 and 1998.

== Career statistics ==
=== International ===
Scores and results list Ivory Coast's goal tally first, score column indicates score after each Ouattara goal.

List of international goals scored by Ahmed Ouattara
No.	Date	Venue	Opponent	Score	Result	Competition
1	2 May 1993	Felix Houphouet Boigny Stadium, Abidjan, Ivory Coast	Nigeria	2–1	2–1	1994 FIFA World Cup qualification
2	10 April 1993	El Menzah Stadium, Tunis, Tunisia	Mali	2–1	3–1	1994 Africa Cup of Nations
3	26 May 1996	Stade Omar Bongo, Libreville, Gabon	Gabon	1–0	1–0	Friendly
4	11 February 1998	Stade Omnisports, Bobo-Dioulasso, Burkina Faso	South Africa	1–1	1–1	1998 Africa Cup of Nations

== Honours ==
FC Sion

- Swiss Championship: 1996–97
- Swiss Cup: 1994–95, 1996–97

Sporting CP

- Supertaça Cândido de Oliveira: 1995
