= Aleksandr Rytchkov =

Russian footballer

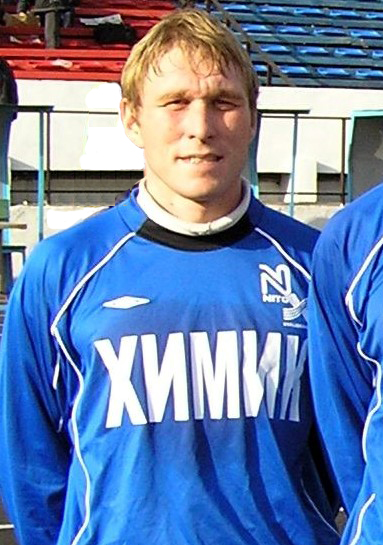
- Aleksandr Rytchkov

Personal information
- Full name: Aleksandr Nikolayevich Rytchkov
- Date of birth: 29 September 1974 (age 52)
- Place of birth: Usolye-Sibirskyoe, Russian SFSR
- Height: 1.78 m (5 ft 10 in)
- Position: Midfielder

Senior career*
| Years | Team | Apps | (Gls) |
| 1991–1992 | Lokomotiv Moscow | 13 | (1) |
| 1992–1996 | Standard Liège | 51 | (2) |
| 1996–1997 | Lens | 17 | (1) |
| 1997–1998 | 1. FC Köln | 12 | (1) |
| 1998–1999 | Basel | 25 | (5) |
| 2000 | SR Delémont | 8 | (1) |
| 2001–2002 | SC Paderborn | 1 | (0) |
| 2002 | Bellinzona | 5 | (1) |
- FC Khimik Usolie-Sibirskoe

International career
| 1991–1994 | Russia U19 | | |
| 1994–1995 | Russia U21 | 5 | (1) |
- * Club domestic league appearances and goals

Aleksandr Nikolayevich Rytchkov (Russian: Александр Николаевич Рычков; born 29 September 1974) is a Russian former professional footballer.

He played for Standard Liège, RC Lens, 1. FC Köln, FC Basel, SR Delémont, SC Paderborn 07 and AC Bellinzona. He was fired by RC Lens for a positive cannabis test in 1996.

Rytchkov joined Basel's first team for their 1998–99 season under head coach Guy Mathez. After playing in five test games, Rytchkov played his domestic league debut for his new club in the home game in the St. Jakob Stadium on 18 July 1998 as Basel played a goalless draw against Sion. He scored his first goal for the club on 25 July in the home game against Zürich, it was the first goal of the match as Basel won 2–1. He suffered an injury during a test match after the winter break in February 1999 of that season, that kept him out of the game until May that year.

In the following season Rytchkov moved on to SR Delémont. During his time with Basel Rytchkov played a total of 36 games for the club, scoring a total of seven goals. 25 of these games were in the Nationalliga A and 11 were friendly games. He scored five goals in the domestic league and the other two were scored during the test games.

== Sources ==
- Rotblau: Jahrbuch Saison 2017/2018. Publisher: FC Basel Marketing AG. ISBN 978-3-7245-2189-1
- Die ersten 125 Jahre. Publisher: Josef Zindel im Friedrich Reinhardt Verlag, Basel. ISBN 978-3-7245-2305-5
- Verein "Basler Fussballarchiv" Homepage

France Football (2627): 29. August 1996. 0015-9557.
