= Dan Potocianu =

Romanian footballer

Personal information
- Full name: Dan Ion Potocianu
- Date of birth: 5 March 1974 (age 52)
- Place of birth: Reșița, Romania
- Height: 1.82 m (6 ft 0 in)
- Position: Defender

Team information
- Current team: CSM Reșița (youth manager)

Youth career
- –1991: CSM Reșița

Senior career*
Years	Team	Apps	(Gls)
1991–1993	CSM Reșița	28	(0)
1993–1997	Național București	118	(6)
1997–2000	Servette	54	(2)
1999	→ Basel (loan)	10	(0)
2000–2002	Național București	40	(1)
Total		250	(9)

International career
1990–1991	Romania U18	6	(0)
1992–1995	Romania U21	24	(1)
1997	Romania	1	(0)

Managerial career
- 2008: FCM Reșița
- 2008–2009: CFR Timișoara
- 2014–2016: CSMȘ Reșița
- 2016–2022: CSMȘ Reșița (youth)
- 2017: CSM Reșița (assistant)
- * Club domestic league appearances and goals

Dan Ion Potocianu (born 5 March 1974) is a Romanian former professional footballer who played as a defender.

== Club career ==
Potocianu was born on 5 March 1974 in Reșița, Romania. He began playing football in 1990 at Divizia B club CSM Reșița. In the 1991–92 season, the team earned promotion to the first league. Subsequently, he made his Divizia A debut on 16 August 1992 under coach Ion Copăceanu in a 3–2 home win over Inter Sibiu.

In 1993, Potocianu went to Național București. He played four games in the 1996–97 UEFA Cup edition, eliminating Partizan Belgrade and Chornomorets Odesa in the first rounds, the campaign ending after a 3–1 aggregate loss to Club Brugge. During his four-season spell with The Bankers, he helped the team finish twice runner-up in the league. The team also reached the 1997 Cupa României final, but coach Florin Halagian did not use him in the 4–2 loss to Steaua București.

Subsequently, Potocianu joined Servette, making his Nationalliga A debut on 5 July 1997 under coach Gérard Castella in a 2–2 draw against St. Gallen. The team finished in second place at the end of the season. In the first half of the 1998–99 season, he played 10 matches and scored once. Afterwards he went to Basel for the second half, but Servette won the title without him. At Basel, Potocianu played his first match under coach Guy Mathez in a 2–1 defeat to Servette. During his short period with the club, Potocianu played 10 league games for Basel without scoring a goal. He returned to Servette for the 1999–2000 season, totaling 64 matches with two goals in the Swiss league.

Potocianu came back to Național, where in the 2001–02 season he helped the team earn a runner-up position in the league. An injury forced him to retire in 2002 at the age of 28. He has a total of 186 matches with seven goals in Divizia A and eight matches in European competitions.

== International career ==
From 1990 to 1995, Potocianu was consistently featured for Romania's under-18 and under-21 sides.

He made one appearance for Romania, when on 6 September 1997, coach Anghel Iordănescu sent him in the 46th minute to replace Anton Doboș in a 8–1 away win against Liechtenstein in the 1998 World Cup qualifiers.

== Managerial career ==
Potocianu coached in the Romanian lower leagues, managing FCM Reșița—where he also trained the junior squad—and CFR Timișoara, where he served as co-coach alongside Florin Bătrânu.

== Honours ==
=== Player ===
CSM Reșița

- Divizia B: 1991–92

Național București

- Divizia A runner-up: 1995–96, 1996–97, 2001–02
- Cupa României runner-up: 1996–97

Servette

- Nationalliga A: 1998–99, runner-up 1997–98

== Sources ==
- Rotblau: Jahrbuch Saison 2017/2018. Publisher: FC Basel Marketing AG. ISBN 978-3-7245-2189-1
- Die ersten 125 Jahre. Publisher: Josef Zindel im Friedrich Reinhardt Verlag, Basel. ISBN 978-3-7245-2305-5
- Verein "Basler Fussballarchiv" Homepage
