= Atilla Sahin =

Turkish-Swiss footballer (born 1973)

Personal information
- Full name: Atilla Sahin
- Date of birth: 24 October 1973 (age 53)
- Place of birth: Muttenz
- Height: 1.81 m (5 ft 11 in)
- Position: Defender

Youth career
- until 1993: SV Muttenz

Senior career*
Years	Team	Apps	(Gls)
1993–1998	SV Muttenz		
1998–1999	FC Basel	31	(1)
2000	Göztepespor	25	(1)
2000	FC Winterthur	19	(3)
2001–2004	SR Delémont	67	(2)
2005–2008	SV Muttenz		

Managerial career
- 2007–2013: SV Muttenz
- * Club domestic league appearances and goals

Atilla Sahin (born 24 October 1973) is a retired Swiss footballer who played as football defender. He was head-coach for SV Muttenz and is now the club's sport director, as well as a banker and financial advisor.

== Football career ==
Sahin played his youth football with local club SV Muttenz and advanced to their first team in 1993.

Sahin joined Basel's first team for their 1998–99 season, signing his first professional contract under head-coach Guy Mathez. Sahin played his domestic league debut for his new club in the first game of the season, a home game in the St. Jakob Stadium on 18 July 1998 as Basel played a 0–0 draw with Sion. He scored his first goal for his club one week later in the home game on 25 July as Basel won 2–1 against Zürich.

In his first season with Basel Sahin played 28 domestic league matches, but in the first half of his next season he had his place on the substitute bench and so he was moved on during the winter break. In his one and a half seasons with the club, Sahin played a total of 52 games for Basel scoring a total of two goals. 31 of these games were in the Nationalliga A, one in the Swiss Cup, four in the UI Cup and 16 were friendly games. He scored one goal in the domestic league and the other was scored during the test games.

Sahin joined Göztepespor in January 2000 They were looking for a strengthening, because they were fighting against relegation in the 1999–2000 1.Lig. At the end of the season, they suffered relegation and Sahin's contract came to an end. Sahin joined Winterthur, who at that time played in the Nationalliga B, the second tier of Swiss football. He played his first game for them on 15 July 2000 against Bellinzona. On 30 September he scored his first goal for them against SR Delémont. He scored two goals in that match as Winterthur won 6–0. Sahin stayed with Winterthur for just six months.

Sahin then joined SR Delémont also in the Nationalliga B and played his first game for them on 24 February 2001. He scored his first goal for his new team in round 3 on 10 March as Delémont beat FC Wangen bei Olten 6–4. He scored his next goal for them on 21 October 2001 as Delémont beat local rivals Concordia Basel 4–0.

At the end of the Nationalliga B qualification round, Delémont were fourth and thus qualified to play in the promotion/relegation round, a group of eight teams. They finished the 2001–02 Nationalliga promotion/relegation round in sixth position, which was not a promotion place. However, because the three clubs Lugano, Sion and Lausanne-Sport did not obtain a top level license for the following season, Delémont was able to fill one of these places in the 2002–03 Nationalliga A season. However, at the end of the 2002–03 season Sahin and Delémont suffered immediate relegation and a year later they suffered relegation to the third tier, therefore Sahin left the club.

In the summer of 2004 Sahin returned to his club of origin, who in the 2004–05 season played in the fourth tier. At the end of the season Sahin achieved promotion with SV Muttenz.

Soon after Sahin retired from active football. Between 2007 and 2013 he was head-coach for the Muttenz’s first team and has been the club's sport director since 2017.

== Private life ==
Between the years 2006 and 2009 Sahin completed various trainer certificates with the Swiss Football Association and became football instructor. He became banker and worked nearly seven years for Basellandschaftliche Kantonalbank (BLKB). He changed banks to Crédit Agricole in 2018 to become branch manager but returned to BLKB in 2020 and became a financial advisor.

== Sources ==
- Atilla Sahin at WorldFootball.net
- Atilla Sahin at Verein "Basler Fussballarchiv"
- Die ersten 125 Jahre. Publisher: Josef Zindel im Friedrich Reinhardt Verlag, Basel. ISBN 978-3-7245-2305-5
