= Philippe Cravero =

Swiss footballer (born 1970)

Personal information
- Full name: Philippe Cravero
- Date of birth: 2 September 1970 (age 56)
- Place of birth: Geneva, Switzerland
- Height: 1.86 m (6 ft 1 in)
- Position: Left-back

Senior career*
Years	Team	Apps	(Gls)
1990–1994	Neuchâtel Xamax	37	(3)
1994	→ Delémont (loan)	11	(1)
1994–1998	Étoile Carouge	106	(20)
1998–2002	Basel	108	(2)
2002–2003	→ Servette (loan)	26	(3)
2003–2006	Servette	31	(0)
Total		319	(29)
- * Club domestic league appearances and goals

Philippe Cravero (born 2 September 1970) is a Swiss former professional footballer who played as a left-back.

== Football career ==
Cravero began his career at Neuchâtel Xamax in 1990, where he played for four years, during which time he had a loan spell at SR Delémont, before joining Étoile Carouge FC in 1994.

Cravero joined Basel's first team for their 1998–99 season under head coach Guy Mathez. After playing in three test games, he played his domestic league debut for his new club in the home game in the St. Jakob Stadium on 25 July 1998 as Basel won 2–1 against Zürich. He scored his first goal for the club in the next season, on 21 July 1999 in the home game against Grasshopper Club as the two teams played a 1–1 draw.

In the 2001 UEFA Intertoto Cup, Cravero and his team reached the final and played against Aston Villa. However, after a draw in the first leg, Villa won the return leg 4–1 and the tie 5–2 on aggregate. At the end of the 2001–02 Nationalliga A season Basel, with head coach Christian Gross, won the Swiss championship and the Swiss Cup and thus the domestic double.

Soon after the 2002–03 Nationalliga A season had begun, Cravero moved to Servette, first on loan, then definitively. During his four and a bit seasons with the club, between the years 1998 and 2002, Cravero played a total of 185 games for Basel, scoring a total of 5 goals. 108 of these games were in the Nationalliga A, 8 in the Swiss Cup, 16 in the European competitions (UEFA cup and UIC), and 53 were friendly games. He scored two goals in the domestic league, and the other three were scored during the test games.

Cravero played five seasons for Servette and then retired in 2006.

== Honours ==
FC Basel

- Swiss Championship: 2001–02
- Swiss Cup: 2001–02

== Sources ==
- Die ersten 125 Jahre. Publisher: Josef Zindel im Friedrich Reinhardt Verlag, Basel. ISBN 978-3-7245-2305-5
- Verein "Basler Fussballarchiv" Homepage
