= Marco Tschopp =

Swiss footballer (born 1978)

Personal information
- Full name: Marco Tschopp
- Date of birth: 20 January 1978 (age 48)
- Height: 1.84 m (6 ft 0 in)
- Positions: Midfielder; attacking midfielder

Youth career
- until 1995: Basel

Senior career*
Years	Team	Apps	(Gls)
1995–2001	Basel	63	(5)
2000–2001	→ Xamax (loan)	23	(1)
2001–2003	Yverdon Sport FC	61	(12)
2003–2004	Luzern	10	(1)
2004–2005	Wangen bei Olten	15	(1)
2005–	FC Liestal		
- * Club domestic league appearances and goals as of 16 November 2018

Marco Tschopp (* 20 January 1978) is a retired Swiss footballer who played as midfielder or attacking midfielder in the 1990s and 2000s.

== Club career ==
Tschopp played in the youth team of his local side Basel and joined their first team during their 1995–96 season signing his first professional contract under head-coach Claude Andrey. Tschopp played his League debut for Basel on 26 August 1995 in the away match against Servette.

During his first season he played only that one match, during his second only two and during his third season he had 11 appearances in the league. Nine of these were as substitute and twice he was in the starting team. During their 1998–99 season under head-coach Guy Mathez he had more chances to play. He scored his first League goal on 9 August 1998 in St. Jakob Stadium Basel in the home game in the St. Jakob Stadium and it was the winning goal as Basel won 1–0 against Luzern.

But because he was not playing regularly for the season 2000–2001 he was loaned out to Xamax to gain more playing experience. After his return from the loan period Basel's new head-coach Christian Gross was building a new team, so Tschopp moved on. Between the years 1995 and 2001 Tschopp played a total of 100 games for Basel scoring a total of 12 goals. 63 of these games were in the Nationalliga A, one in the Swiss Cup, six in the UI Cup and 30 were friendly games. He scored five goals in the domestic league, one in the domestic cup and the other six were scored during the test games.

In the pre-season 2001 Tschopp transferred to Yverdon Sport FC. During the winter break 2003–04 he moved to Luzern and played for them for half a year. Then after a year by Wangen bei Olten he ended his professional career and moved to local amateur club FC Liestal.

== External links and sources ==
- Marco Tschopp at WorldFootball.net
- Marco Tschopp at Verein "Basler Fussballarchiv"
- Marco Tschopp at Joggeli.ch
- Die ersten 125 Jahre. Publisher: Josef Zindel im Friedrich Reinhardt Verlag, Basel. ISBN 978-3-7245-2305-5
