= Fabinho Santos =

Brazilian footballer and manager (born 1973)

Personal information
- Full name: Fábio José dos Santos
- Date of birth: 26 June 1973 (age 53)
- Place of birth: Telha, Brazil
- Height: 1.72 m (5 ft 8 in)
- Position: Midfielder

Team information
- Current team: Futebol com Vida U20 (head coach)

Senior career*
| Years | Team | Apps | (Gls) |
| 1992–1996 | Vitória | ? | (?) |
| 1997 | Joinville | ? | (?) |
| 1998–1999 | Basel | 16 | (2) |
| 2000 | Joinville | ? | (?) |
| 2001 | Coritiba | 17 | (0) |
| 2002 | Oita Trinita | 33 | (7) |
| 2003–2006 | Albirex Niigata | 104 | (30) |
| 2007 | Juventude | ? | (?) |
| 2007 | Vegalta Sendai | 8 | (0) |

Managerial career
- 2013–2016: Joinville U17
- 2016: Joinville (interim)
- 2017: Joinville
- 2018: Paraná (assistant)
- 2020: Joinville
- 2023–2024: Joinville
- 2024–: Futebol com Vida U20
- * Club domestic league appearances and goals

Fábio José dos Santos (born 26 June 1973), known as Fabinho Santos, is a Brazilian football coach and former player who played as a midfielder. He is the current head coach of Futebol com Vida's under-20 team.

== Playing career ==
Born in Telha, Sergipe, Fabinho Santos played for Vitória, Joinville and Coritiba in the Campeonato Brasileiro.

At the end of the 1998 Campeonato Brasileiro season, Fabinho joined Swiss club Basel's first team during the winter break of their 1997–98 season under head coach Guy Mathez. In this season Fabinho appeared in just two test games, then in the following season he received more playing time. After playing in two test games Fabinho played his domestic league debut for the club in the home game in the St. Jakob Stadium on 15 August 1998 as Basel won 2–0 against Xamax. He scored his first goal for the club on 13 March 1999 in the away game in the Charmilles Stadium. But this goal could not help the team because Basel suffered a 1–2 defeat.

However, under the new head coach Christian Gross, Fabinho was not taken into account as team player and his contract with the club was dissolved during the winter break of their 1999–2000 season. During his short period with the club, Fabinho played a total of 30 games for Basel scoring a total of 9 goals. 16 of these games were in the Nationalliga A and 14 were friendly games. He scored 2 goals in the domestic league, the others were scored during the test games. One test game to be mentioned took place on 1 February 1999 in Saint-Esprit, Martinique. During the club's training camp they played against Stade Spiritain and Fabinho scored four goals as Basel won 7–1.

Fabinho Santos later played for Oita Trinita, Albirex Niigata and Vegalta Sendai in the J1 League.

== Club statistics ==
| Club performance | | | League | | Cup | | League Cup | | Total | |
| Season | Club | League | Apps | Goals | Apps | Goals | Apps | Goals | Apps | Goals |
| Japan | | | League | | Emperor's Cup | | J.League Cup | | Total | |
|---|---|---|---|---|---|---|---|---|---|---|
| 2002 | Oita Trinita | J2 League | 33 | 7 | 0 | 0 | - | | 33 | 7 |
| 2003 | Albirex Niigata | J2 League | 28 | 9 | 3 | 0 | - | | 31 | 9 |
| 2004 | Albirex Niigata | J1 League | 27 | 9 | 0 | 0 | 4 | 0 | 31 | 9 |
| 2005 | Albirex Niigata | J1 League | 26 | 8 | 2 | 0 | 5 | 2 | 33 | 10 |
| 2006 | Albirex Niigata | J1 League | 23 | 4 | 2 | 1 | 4 | 0 | 29 | 5 |
| 2007 | Vegalta Sendai | J2 League | 8 | 0 | 0 | 0 | - | | 8 | 0 |
| Total | | | 145 | 37 | 7 | 1 | 13 | 2 | 165 | 40 |

== Honours ==
Vitória

- Campeonato Baiano (3): 1992, 1995, 1996

Joinville

- Campeonato Catarinense (1): 2000

Oita Trinita

- J. League Division 2 (1) : 2002

Albirex Niigata

- J. League Division 2 (1) : 2003
