= Abedi (footballer) =

Brazilian footballer (born 1979)

Personal information
- Full name: Robson Vicente Gonçalves
- Date of birth: 14 April 1979 (age 47)
- Place of birth: Rio de Janeiro, Brazil
- Height: 1.66 m (5 ft 5 in)
- Position: Attacking midfielder

Youth career
- 1995–1996: Campo Grande-RJ

Senior career*
| Years | Team | Apps | (Gls) |
| 1997 | Campo Grande-RJ | | |
| 1997–1998 | Sion | 7 | (0) |
| 1998–1999 | Basel | 25 | (3) |
| 1999–2000 | Yverdon | 13 | (0) |
| 2001 | Mogi Mirim | | |
| 2001 | Coritiba | | |
| 2001 | Cruzeiro | | |
| 2002 | Santa Cruz | | |
| 2003 | Avaí | | |
| 2004 | Friburguense | | |
| 2004 | América-RN | | |
| 2005 | Friburguense | | |
| 2005–2007 | Vasco da Gama | | |
| 2007–2008 | Hapoel Tel Aviv | | |
| 2008 | → Botafogo (loan) | | |
| 2008 | → Juventude (loan) | | |
| 2009 | Madureira | | |
| 2009 | Friburguense | | |
| 2009 | → Duque de Caxias (loan) | | |
| 2010 | Bahia | | |
| 2011 | Madureira | | |
| 2011 | Duque de Caxias | | |
| 2012 | Goianésia | | |
| 2012 | Caxias | | |
| 2013 | Cabofriense | | |
| 2014 | Friburguense | | |
| 2015 | America | | |
- * Club domestic league appearances and goals

Robson Vicente Gonçalves or simply Abedi (born 14 April 1979), is a Brazilian former footballer who played as attacking midfielder.

Abedi played for Sion in the 1997–98 Nationalliga A season.

He joined Basel's first team for their 1998–99 season under head coach Guy Mathez. After playing in one test game Abedi played his domestic league debut for the club in the away game in the Charmilles Stadium on 1 August 1998 as Basel lost 1–3 against Servette, being substituted in the 71st minute. He scored his first goal for his new team in the 84th minute of that match.

Abedi stayed with the club for this one season in which he played a total of 38 games for Basel scoring a total of 5 goals. 25 of these games were in the Nationalliga A, 1 in the Swiss Cup and 12 were friendly games. He scored 3 goals in the domestic league, the other 2 were scored during the test games.

He then moved on to play for newly promoted Yverdon in the 1999–2000 Nationalliga A season.

Abedi was signed 4-year contract with Hapoel Tel Aviv, but after only half a season was loaned to other clubs in his native Brazil.

== Honours ==
Botafogo

- Taça Rio: 2008
- Copa Internacional Legends: 2019

Cabofriense

- Campeonato Carioca Série A2: 2013

América-RJ

- Campeonato Carioca Série A2: 2015
