= Ivan Reimann =

Swiss footballer (born 1978)

Personal information
- Full name: Ivan Reimann
- Date of birth: 16 May 1978 (age 48)
- Height: 1.78 m (5 ft 10 in)
- Position: Defender

Youth career
- until 1996: FC Basel

Senior career*
| Years | Team | Apps | (Gls) |
| 1996–1999 | FC Basel | 27 | (0) |
| 1999 | → BSC Young Boys (loan) | 17 | (0) |
| 2000 | FC Basel | 0 | (0) |
| 2000–2003 | SR Delémont | 35 | (0) |
| 2003–2004 | FC Concordia Basel | 19 | (0) |
| 2004–2006 | SC Dornach | 18 | (4) |
| 2006–2008 | SV Muttenz | 30 | (3) |
- * Club domestic league appearances and goals

Ivan Reimann (born 16 May 1978) is a retired Swiss footballer who played in the late 1990s and 2000s as defender.

Reimann played his youth football with FC Basel and advanced from their youth and reserve team to Basel's first team for their 1996–97 season signing his first professional contract under head-coach Karl Engel. After playing in two test matches and two UI Cup games Reimann played his domestic league debut for the club in the away game on 26 March 1997 as Basel were defeated 0–3 by Xamax. Reimann was booked in the 60th minute and substituted out soon afterwards.

During the following season Reimann was used as a substitute and a year later he advanced to the starting eleven. Reimann played with the first team for three seasons and was then loaned to BSC Young Boys for the first half of the 1999–2000 season. For YB he played 17 league matches in these six months. During the winter break he then returned to his club of origin but did not play any further games and so moved on. During his time with the club Reimann played a total of 49 games for Basel scoring one goal. 27 of these games were in the Nationalliga A, one in the Swiss Cup, two in the UI Cup and 19 were friendly games. He scored his one goal during the test games.

Following his time with Basel Reimann moved to play for SR Delémont, who at that time played in the Nationalliga B, the second tier of Swiss football. At the end of the Nationalliga B qualification round, Delémont were fourth and thus qualified to play in the promotion/relegation round, a group of eight teams. They finished the 2001–02 Nationalliga promotion/relegation round in sixth position, which was not a promotion place. However, because the three clubs Lugano, Sion and Lausanne-Sport did not obtain a top level license for the following season, Delémont was able to fill one of these places in the 2002–03 Nationalliga A season. However, at the end of the 2002–03 season Reimann and Delémont suffered immediate relegation. After having played three seasons for Delémont, Reimann moved on.

Reimann then signed to play one season for FC Concordia Basel, who also played in the second level. He then moved on to play two seasons for amateur club SC Dornach, in the third tier of Swiss football, and then played two season for SV Muttenz, also in the third tier.

== Sources ==
- Ivan Reimann at WorldFootball.net
- Die ersten 125 Jahre. Publisher: Josef Zindel im Friedrich Reinhardt Verlag, Basel. ISBN 978-3-7245-2305-5
- Verein "Basler Fussballarchiv" Homepage
