= 1996–97 Nationalliga A =

Swiss football season

Nationalliga A
- Season: 1996–97
- Champions: Sion
- Relegated: Young Boys; Lugano
- Top goalscorer: Viorel Moldovan (27 goals)

Nationalliga B
- Season: 1996–97
- Champions: Étoile Carouge
- Promoted: Étoile Carouge; Kriens
- Relegated: Gossau; Meyrin

Statistics of Swiss National League in the 1996–97 football season.

== Overview ==
The 24 teams of the Swiss Football League (Nationalliga) were divided into two divisions. Both Nationalliga A (NLA) and Nationalliga B (NLB) were contested by 12 teams, with each team playing a double round-robin in the qualification phase. Thereafter, the divisions were divided into a championship group, a NLA/NLB promotion/relegation group and a relegation group NLB/1. Liga, each group with eight teams.

== Nationalliga A ==
=== Qualification phase ===
The first stage of the NLA began on 10 July 1996 and was completed on 1 December. The top eight teams in the qualification phase would advance to the championship group and the last four teams would play against relegation.

==== Table ====
Pos	Team	Pld	W	D	L	GF	GA	GD	Pts	Qualification
1	Xamax	22	12	8	2	36	20	+16	44	Advance to championship round halved points (rounded up) as bonus
2	Grasshopper Club	22	10	9	3	42	27	+15	39	Advance to championship round halved points (rounded up) as bonus
3	Sion	22	9	10	3	33	21	+12	37	Advance to championship round halved points (rounded up) as bonus
4	Aarau	22	9	8	5	21	14	+7	35	Advance to championship round halved points (rounded up) as bonus
5	Lausanne-Sports	22	9	7	6	35	32	+3	34	Advance to championship round halved points (rounded up) as bonus
6	St. Gallen	22	6	10	6	20	26	−6	28	Advance to championship round halved points (rounded up) as bonus
7	Zürich	22	6	9	7	24	25	−1	27	Advance to championship round halved points (rounded up) as bonus
8	Basel	22	5	11	6	32	32	0	26	Advance to championship round halved points (rounded up) as bonus
9	Servette	22	5	9	8	24	25	−1	24	Continue to promotion/relegation round
10	Luzern	22	4	11	7	27	32	−5	23	Continue to promotion/relegation round
11	Lugano	22	2	9	11	14	32	−18	15	Continue to promotion/relegation round
12	Young Boys	22	3	3	16	17	39	−22	12	Continue to promotion/relegation round

Source: rsssf.com
Rules for classification: 1) Points; 2) Goal difference; 3) Goals scored; 4) Head-to-head points; 5) Away goals scored; 6) Draw.

==== Results ====
Home \ Away	AAR	BAS	GCZ	LS	LUG	LUZ	NX	SIO	SER	STG	ZÜR	YB
Aarau		0–1	0–1	2–0	4–0	0–0	1–1	0–0	1–1	2–0	2–1	1–0
Basel	2–0		4–5	2–4	2–0	2–2	0–1	0–3	1–1	2–2	0–0	1–1
Grasshopper Club	0–0	4–2		2–1	2–0	2–2	0–0	2–2	2–1	0–0	0–1	6–2
Lausanne-Sport	0–1	0–0	1–0		4–0	2–2	3–0	1–1	1–2	2–0	3–2	3–2
Lugano	0–1	1–1	0–0	2–2		2–1	1–2	1–1	1–1	0–0	2–2	2–1
Luzern	0–1	0–3	1–1	2–2	1–0		2–2	3–3	0–2	0–0	3–0	2–1
Neuchâtel Xamax	2–0	3–3	3–1	6–1	1–0	1–1		1–3	2–1	3–0	1–1	2–1
Sion	1–0	2–2	1–1	1–1	1–0	2–0	1–1		3–1	3–1	0–1	1–0
Servette	1–2	2–0	2–2	1–2	2–0	1–2	0–0	0–0		1–1	0–0	2–0
St. Gallen	1–1	1–0	2–3	1–1	1–1	3–2	1–3	2–1	1–0		1–0	2–1
Zürich	1–1	1–1	2–4	3–0	1–1	1–1	0–1	2–1	3–1	0–0		0–1
Young Boys	1–1	0–3	0–4	0–1	1–0	2–1	0–1	1–2	1–1	0–1	1–2	

Source: RSSSF
Legend: Blue = home team win; Yellow = draw; Red = away team win.

=== Championship group ===
The first eight teams of the qualification phase competed in the Championship round. The teams took half of the points (rounded up to complete units) gained in the qualification as bonus with them.

==== Table ====
Pos	Team	Pld	W	D	L	GF	GA	GD	BP	Pts	Qualification
1	Sion	14	9	3	2	18	10	+8	19	49	Swiss champions, qualified for 1997–98 Champions League
2	Xamax	14	6	6	2	22	14	+8	22	46	qualified for 1997–98 UEFA Cup
3	Grasshopper Club	14	7	4	3	37	18	+19	20	45	qualified for 1997–98 UEFA Cup
4	Lausanne-Sports	14	8	2	4	20	16	+4	17	43	entered 1997 UEFA Intertoto Cup
5	Aarau	14	3	4	7	17	22	−5	18	31	entered 1997 UEFA Intertoto Cup
6	St. Gallen	14	3	4	7	13	26	−13	14	27	
7	Zürich	14	1	7	6	9	18	−9	14	24	
8	Basel	14	3	2	9	16	28	−12	13	24	

Source: rsssf.com
Rules for classification: 1) points; 2) Position in the qualification.

==== Results ====
Home \ Away	AAR	BAS	GCZ	LS	NX	SIO	STG	ZÜR
Aarau		2–1	0–1	2–0	2–3	1–1	1–2	1–1
Basel	3–2		3–3	3–2	1–3	0–1	1–2	1–0
Grasshopper Club	4–2	4–1		5–0	1–1	1–2	8–0	1–1
Lausanne-Sport	2–0	2–0	3–2		1–1	2–0	2–1	2–0
Neuchâtel Xamax	2–1	3–0	2–3	0–0		0–0	2–0	3–1
Sion	2–3	1–0	1–0	1–0	3–1		2–1	3–1
St. Gallen	0–0	2–1	2–2	0–2	1–1	0–1		1–2
Zürich	0–0	1–1	0–2	1–2	0–0	0–0	1–1	

Source: RSSSF
Legend: Blue = home team win; Yellow = draw; Red = away team win.

=== Attendances ===
#	Football club	Average attendance
1	FC Basel	10,811
2	FC Sion	10,739
3	Xamax Neuchâtel	8,925
4	FC Luzern	8,718
5	FC St. Gallen	8,200
6	Grasshopper Club Zürich	7,981
7	Lausanne-Sport	6,994
8	FC Zürich	5,883
9	Servette FC	4,956
10	BSC Young Boys	4,868
11	FC Aarau	4,622
12	FC Lugano	2,447

== Nationalliga B ==
=== Qualification phase ===
The NLB was contested by 12 teams with each team playing each other twice in the qualification phase. The first stage began on 13 July 1996 and was completed on 23 November. The division was then separated into a NLA/NLB promotion/relegation group and a relegation group to the 1. Liga. The top four teams would play for promotion and the last eight teams would play against relegation.

==== Table ====
Pos	Team	Pld	W	D	L	GF	GA	GD	Pts	Qualification or relegation
1	Étoile Carouge	22	11	9	2	39	20	+19	42	Advance to promotion/relegation NLA/LNB round
2	FC Schaffhausen	22	12	6	4	32	18	+14	42	Advance to promotion/relegation NLA/LNB round
3	Kriens	22	12	5	5	40	25	+15	41	Advance to promotion/relegation NLA/LNB round
4	Solothurn	22	10	7	5	28	26	+2	37	Advance to promotion/relegation NLA/LNB round
5	Yverdon-Sport	22	9	8	5	34	26	+8	35	Continue to relegation round NLB/1. Liga halved points (rounded up) as bonus
6	Winterthur	22	9	7	6	30	21	+9	34	Continue to relegation round NLB/1. Liga halved points (rounded up) as bonus
7	Locarno	22	7	7	8	28	27	+1	28	Continue to relegation round NLB/1. Liga halved points (rounded up) as bonus
8	Wil	22	7	6	9	33	30	+3	27	Continue to relegation round NLB/1. Liga halved points (rounded up) as bonus
9	Baden	22	7	6	9	29	30	−1	27	Continue to relegation round NLB/1. Liga halved points (rounded up) as bonus
10	Delémont	22	5	5	12	30	44	−14	20	Continue to relegation round NLB/1. Liga halved points (rounded up) as bonus
11	Gossau	22	4	4	14	29	50	−21	16	Continue to relegation round NLB/1. Liga halved points (rounded up) as bonus
12	Meyrin	22	2	4	16	15	50	−35	10	Continue to relegation round NLB/1. Liga halved points (rounded up) as bonus

Source: RSSSF
Rules for classification: 1) Points; 2) Goal difference; 3) Goals scored; 4) Head-to-head points; 5) Away goals scored; 6) Draw.

=== Promotion/relegation group NLA/NLB ===
The teams in the ninth to twelfth positions in Nationalliga A competed with the top four teams of Nationalliga B in a Nationalliga A/B promotion/relegation round. The teams played a double round-robin.

==== Table ====
Pos	Team	Pld	W	D	L	GF	GA	GD	Pts	Qualification
1	Servette	14	7	4	3	18	10	+8	25	Remain in 1997–98 Nationalliga A
2	Étoile Carouge	14	7	3	4	15	13	+2	24	Promoted
3	Luzern	14	6	5	3	16	12	+4	23	Remain in 1997–98 Nationalliga A
4	Kriens	14	6	4	4	22	16	+6	22	Promoted
5	Young Boys	14	5	5	4	19	17	+2	20	Relegated
6	Solothurn	14	3	5	6	9	17	−8	14	Remain in Nationalliga B
7	Lugano	14	2	5	7	11	17	−6	11	Relegated
8	FC Schaffhausen	14	2	5	7	13	21	−8	11	Remain in Nationalliga B

Source: RSSSF
Rules for classification: 1) Points; 2) Goal difference; 3) Goals scored; 4) Head-to-head points; 5) Away goals scored; 6) Draw.

==== Results ====
Home \ Away	ÉTO	KRI	LUG	LUZ	SHA	SER	SOL	YB
Étoile Carouge		0–2	1–1	0–1	1–0	2–3	2–0	1–1
Kriens	0–0		2–1	3–0	6–2	1–2	2–0	1–1
Lugano	0–1	2–0		0–0	1–1	1–2	2–3	1–2
Luzern	0–1	2–0	3–0		0–3	0–0	2–0	1–1
Schaffhausen	1–2	0–0	0–0	2–3		1–0	0–0	1–3
Servette	0–1	4–0	0–0	1–3	2–0		1–0	0–0
Solothurn	0–1	2–2	2–1	0–0	0–0	1–1		1–0
Young Boys	4–2	0–3	0–1	1–1	3–2	0–2	3–0	

Source: RSSSF
Legend: Blue = home team win; Yellow = draw; Red = away team win.

=== Relegation group NLB/1. Liga ===
The last eight teams of the qualification phase competed in the relegation group against relegation to the 1. Liga. The teams took half of the points (rounded up to complete units) gained in the qualification as bonus with them.

==== Table ====
Pos	Team	Pld	W	D	L	GF	GA	GD	BP	Pts	Qualification or relegation
1	Winterthur	14	8	2	4	21	13	+8	17	43	Remain in NLB
2	Baden	14	7	4	3	28	20	+8	14	39	Remain in NLB
3	Wil	14	6	3	5	23	21	+2	14	35	Remain in NLB
4	Yverdon-Sport	14	4	4	6	17	21	−4	18	34	Remain in NLB
5	Locarno	14	4	7	3	14	14	0	14	33	Remain in NLB
6	Delémont	14	5	5	4	28	24	+4	10	30	Remain in NLB
7	Gossau	14	5	1	8	15	23	−8	8	24	Relegated to 1. Liga
8	Meyrin	14	1	6	7	13	23	−10	5	14	Relegated to 1. Liga

Source: RSSSF
Rules for classification: 1) points; 2) Position in the qualification.

== Sources ==
- Switzerland 1996–97 at RSSSF
