= Telha =

Municipality in Sergipe, Brazil

Coordinates: 10°12′28″S 36°53′02″W

- Municipality
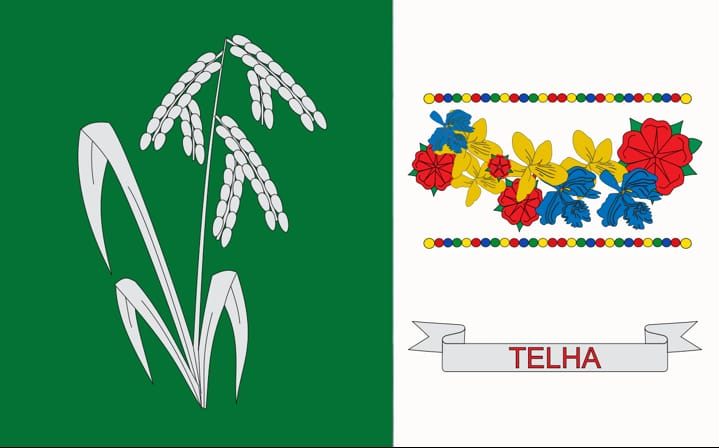
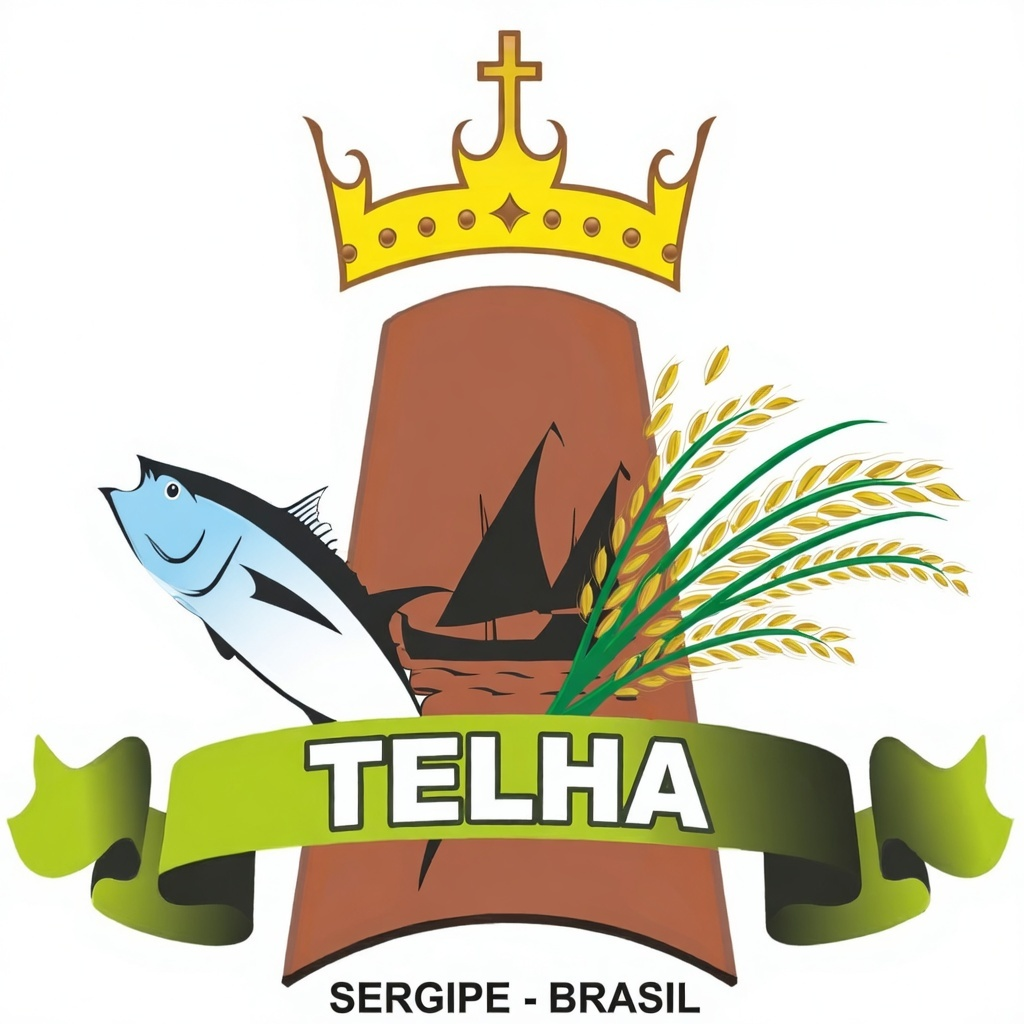
- Flag Coat of arms
- Interactive map of Telha
- Country: Brazil
- Time zone: UTC−3 (BRT)

Telha (Central northeastern portuguese pronunciation: [ˈteʎɐ] or [ˈtejɐ]) is a municipality in the Brazilian state of Sergipe. Its population was 3,249 (2020) and its area is 49 km^{2} (19 sq mi).

== See also ==
- List of municipalities in Sergipe
