= Vincenzo Zinna =

Italian-born Swiss footballer (born 1981)

Personal information
- Date of birth: 26 August 1981 (age 45)
- Place of birth: Italy
- Height: 1.70 m (5 ft 7 in)
- Position: Midfielder

Youth career
- FC Amriswil

Senior career*
Years	Team	Apps	(Gls)
1997–1999	FC St. Gallen	26	(0)
2002–2003	FC St. Gallen	3	(0)
2003–2008	SCR Altach	84	(1)
2008–2009	FC Gossau	5	(0)
- * Club domestic league appearances and goals as of 20 June 2008 ‡ National team caps and goals as of 20 June 2008

Vincenzo Zinna (born 26 August 1981) is a Swiss football player who last plays as a midfielder for FC Gossau in the Swiss Challenge League.

== Club career ==
Zinna started his professional career at FC St. Gallen and moved to Grasshopper and then Austria. In summer 2008, he joined Gossau from Austrian side SC Rheindorf Altach.
