= Slaven Matan =

Swiss footballer (born 1978)

Personal information
- Date of birth: 17 October 1978 (age 48)
- Position: Goalkeeper

Senior career*
Years	Team	Apps	(Gls)
1998–1999	FC Basel	1	(0)
1999–2000	BSC Young Boys		
2000–2001	FC Basel		
2001–2002	FC Altstetten (Zürich)		
2002–2005	SC YF Juventus		

International career
- Switzerland u-21
- * Club domestic league appearances and goals

Slaven Matan (born 17 October 1978) is a retired Swiss football goalkeeper.
