= Seyni N'Diaye =

Senegalese footballer (born 1973)

Personal information
- Full name: Seyni N'Diaye
- Date of birth: 6 September 1973 (age 53)
- Place of birth: Dakar, Senegal
- Height: 1.87 m (6 ft 2 in)
- Positions: Striker; left winger

Youth career
- –1998: Paris Saint Germain

Senior career*
Years	Team	Apps	(Gls)
1998–1999	Neuchâtel Xamax	36	(9)
1999–2001	Caen	37	(4)
2001–2002	Tranmere Rovers	19	(4)
2002–2003	Dunfermline Athletic	8	(1)
2003–2004	AEL Limassol	10	(7)
2004–2005	Kerkyra	23	(2)
2005–2006	Omonoia	3	(0)
2006–2007	Nea Salamis Famagusta	12	(1)
2007–2008	AEL Limassol	28	(5)
- * Club domestic league appearances and goals

Seyni N'Diaye (born 6 September 1973) is a retired Senegalese footballer who played as a striker. He played in Cyprus for and in England for Tranmere Rovers and in Scotland for Dunfermline.
