= 1997–98 Nationalliga A =

Swiss football season

Nationalliga A
- Season: 1997–98
- Champions: Grasshoppers; 25th title
- Relegated: Étoile Carouge; Kriens
- Top goalscorer: Shabani Nonda (24 goals)

Nationalliga B
- Season: 1997–98
- Champions: Lugano
- Relegated: Winterthur; SV Schaffhausen

Statistics of the Swiss National Leagues in the 1997–98 football season.

== Overview ==
Both Nationalliga A and Nationalliga B were contested by 12 teams, with each team playing a double round-robin in the qualification phase. There after the divisions were divided into a championship group, a NLA/NLB promotion/relegation group and a relegation group NLB/1. Liga.

== Nationalliga A ==
At the end of the season Grasshopper Club won the championship.

=== Qualification phase ===
The top eight teams in the qualification phase would advance to the championship group and the last four teams would play against relegation.

==== Table ====
Pos	Team	Pld	W	D	L	GF	GA	GD	Pts	Qualification
1	Grasshopper Club	22	14	4	4	59	23	+36	46	Advance to championship round halved points (rounded up) as bonus
2	Lausanne-Sport	22	12	6	4	45	27	+18	42	Advance to championship round halved points (rounded up) as bonus
3	Servette	22	11	6	5	45	33	+12	39	Advance to championship round halved points (rounded up) as bonus
4	Aarau	22	10	5	7	38	31	+7	35	Advance to championship round halved points (rounded up) as bonus
5	St. Gallen	22	7	9	6	38	34	+4	30	Advance to championship round halved points (rounded up) as bonus
6	Zürich	22	7	9	6	31	28	+3	30	Advance to championship round halved points (rounded up) as bonus
7	Sion	22	7	9	6	30	27	+3	30	Advance to championship round halved points (rounded up) as bonus
8	Luzern	22	7	8	7	26	28	−2	29	Advance to championship round halved points (rounded up) as bonus
9	Xamax	22	7	5	10	37	39	−2	26	Continue to promotion/relegation round
10	Kriens	22	5	7	10	23	41	−18	22	Continue to promotion/relegation round
11	Basel	22	5	4	13	28	46	−18	19	Continue to promotion/relegation round
12	Étoile Carouge	22	1	6	15	20	63	−43	9	Continue to promotion/relegation round

Source: rsssf.com
Rules for classification: 1) Points; 2) Goal difference; 3) Goals scored; 4) Head-to-head points; 5) Away goals scored; 6) Draw.

==== Results ====
Home \ Away	AAR	BAS	ÉTO	GCZ	KRI	LS	LUZ	NX	SER	SIO	STG	ZÜR
Aarau		1–0	3–0	0–2	3–0	4–2	3–1	2–2	3–1	1–1	2–0	1–0
Basel	2–1		0–0	1–0	4–1	0–1	3–4	1–4	1–3	1–3	3–2	3–3
Étoile Carouge	1–1	2–1		0–6	0–2	3–7	0–1	0–4	1–2	0–1	3–3	1–3
Grasshopper	4–1	3–2	6–0		1–0	5–1	3–0	7–2	4–0	2–1	2–2	3–1
Kriens	3–5	3–1	2–0	2–1		0–0	2–0	1–1	1–1	0–0	1–5	1–1
Lausanne-Sport	2–1	3–0	2–2	1–1	4–0		1–1	1–1	3–2	4–1	3–0	4–1
Luzern	0–0	0–1	1–1	3–2	1–1	1–0		2–0	0–0	2–2	2–1	2–2
Neuchâtel Xamax	3–0	3–0	6–2	1–2	4–1	0–2	1–0		1–2	1–4	2–2	1–1
Servette	2–1	4–1	5–1	3–2	2–2	3–0	3–5	2–0		1–0	2–2	4–1
Sion	2–3	2–2	1–1	1–1	3–0	0–2	1–0	1–0	1–1		2–4	3–1
St. Gallen	2–1	3–1	3–2	0–0	3–0	1–2	0–0	3–0	1–1	0–0		1–1
Zürich	1–1	0–0	5–3	1–2	1–0	0–0	1–0	3–0	2–1	0–0	4–0	

Source: rsssf.com
Legend: Blue = home team win; Yellow = draw; Red = away team win.

=== Championship round ===
The first eight teams of the qualification phase competed in the Championship round. The teams took half of the points (rounded up to complete units) gained in the qualification as bonus with them.

==== Table ====
Pos	Team	Pld	W	D	L	GF	GA	GD	BP	Pts	Qualification
1	Grasshopper Club (C)	14	11	1	2	39	16	+23	23	57	Qualification to Champions League first qualifying round
2	Servette	14	5	6	3	18	15	+3	20	41	Qualification to UEFA Cup second qualifying round
3	Lausanne-Sport	14	5	4	5	17	17	0	21	40	Qualification to Cup Winners' Cup qualifying round
4	Zürich	14	6	5	3	27	17	+10	15	38	Qualification to UEFA Cup second qualifying round
5	Sion	14	6	4	4	23	21	+2	15	37	Qualification to Intertoto Cup first round
6	St. Gallen	14	4	5	5	12	17	−5	15	32	Qualification to Intertoto Cup first round
7	Aarau	14	1	4	9	13	27	−14	18	25	
8	Luzern	14	1	5	8	10	29	−19	15	23	

Source: rsssf.com
Rules for classification: 1) points; 2) Position in the qualification.
(C) Champions

==== Results ====
Home \ Away	AAR	GCZ	LS	LUZ	SER	SIO	STG	ZÜR
Aarau		0–3	2–0	1–1	1–3	1–2	0–1	1–2
Grasshopper	5–3		3–0	4–0	4–2	5–2	2–2	2–1
Lausanne-Sport	4–1	2–1		2–0	0–0	0–0	4–1	1–2
Luzern	0–0	0–3	1–0		0–0	2–3	0–2	2–2
Servette	1–1	2–1	1–2	1–1		2–1	3–0	1–1
Sion	0–0	1–2	3–0	5–2	2–0		0–0	3–2
St. Gallen	2–0	1–2	0–0	2–1	0–1	1–1		0–0
Zürich	3–2	0–2	2–2	4–0	1–1	4–0	3–0	

Source: rsssf.com
Legend: Blue = home team win; Yellow = draw; Red = away team win.

== Nationalliga B ==
=== Qualification phase ===
The NLB was contested by 12 teams with each team playing each other twice in the qualification phase. Then the division was separated into a NLA/NLB promotion/relegation group and a relegation group to the 1. Liga. The top four teams would play for promotion and the last eight teams would play against relegation.

==== Table ====
Pos	Team	Pld	W	D	L	GF	GA	GD	Pts	Qualification or relegation
1	Young Boys	22	13	3	6	48	22	+26	42	Advance to promotion/relegation NLA/LNB round
2	Lugano	22	11	7	4	44	21	+23	40	Advance to promotion/relegation NLA/LNB round
3	Baden	22	12	3	7	42	31	+11	39	Advance to promotion/relegation NLA/LNB round
4	Solothurn	22	9	10	3	31	19	+12	37	Advance to promotion/relegation NLA/LNB round
5	Delémont	22	11	3	8	47	31	+16	36	Continue to relegation round NLB/1. Liga halved points (rounded up) as bonus
6	Locarno	22	9	7	6	46	36	+10	34	Continue to relegation round NLB/1. Liga halved points (rounded up) as bonus
7	Wil	22	8	10	4	31	26	+5	34	Continue to relegation round NLB/1. Liga halved points (rounded up) as bonus
8	FC Schaffhausen	22	9	6	7	35	32	+3	33	Continue to relegation round NLB/1. Liga halved points (rounded up) as bonus
9	Yverdon-Sport	22	7	9	6	37	33	+4	30	Continue to relegation round NLB/1. Liga halved points (rounded up) as bonus
10	Winterthur	22	3	7	12	22	41	−19	16	Continue to relegation round NLB/1. Liga halved points (rounded up) as bonus
11	SV Schaffhausen	22	1	6	15	12	63	−51	9	Continue to relegation round NLB/1. Liga halved points (rounded up) as bonus
12	Thun	22	1	5	16	18	58	−40	8	Continue to relegation round NLB/1. Liga halved points (rounded up) as bonus

Source: rsssf.com
Rules for classification: 1) Points; 2) Goal difference; 3) Goals scored; 4) Head-to-head points; 5) Away goals scored; 6) Draw.

=== Promotion/relegation group NLA/NLB ===
The teams in the ninth to twelfth positions in Nationalliga A competed with the top four teams of Nationalliga B in a Nationalliga A/B promotion/relegation round.

==== Table ====
Pos	Team	Pld	W	D	L	GF	GA	GD	Pts	Qualification
1	Xamax	14	7	5	2	35	22	+13	26	Remain in 1998–99 Nationalliga A
2	Lugano	14	6	5	3	15	12	+3	23	Promoted
3	Basel	14	6	4	4	27	22	+5	22	Remain in 1998–99 Nationalliga A
4	BSC Young Boys	14	6	4	4	20	23	−3	22	Promoted
5	Solothurn	14	6	3	5	17	15	+2	21	Remain in 1998–99 Nationalliga B
6	Kriens	14	4	4	6	19	25	−6	16	Relegated
7	Baden	14	3	3	8	15	23	−8	12	Remain in 1998–99 Nationalliga B
8	Étoile Carouge	14	3	2	9	13	19	−6	11	Relegated

Source: rsssf.com
Rules for classification: 1) Points; 2) Goal difference; 3) Goals scored; 4) Head-to-head points; 5) Away goals scored; 6) Draw.

==== Results ====
Home \ Away	BAD	BAS	ÉTO	KRI	NX	LUG	SOL	YB
Baden		3–1	1–3	0–2	5–1	1–2	0–1	2–1
Basel	0–0		3–1	4–2	3–6	0–0	3–0	4–1
Étoile Carouge	0–0	2–0		2–0	1–2	0–1	2–3	0–1
Kriens	1–1	1–3	2–1		4–4	3–0	1–0	0–3
Neuchâtel Xamax	5–0	2–1	0–0	1–1		3–0	2–1	6–1
Lugano	2–0	0–0	3–0	2–1	3–1		0–0	1–2
Solothurn	1–0	2–3	1–0	3–0	2–2	0–0		1–2
Young Boys	3–2	2–2	2–1	1–1	0–0	1–1	0–2	

Source: rsssf.com
Legend: Blue = home team win; Yellow = draw; Red = away team win.

=== Relegation group NLB/1. Liga ===
The last eight teams of the qualification phase competed in the relegation group against relegation to the 1. Liga. The teams took half of the points (rounded up to complete units) gained in the qualification as bonus with them.

==== Table ====
Pos	Team	Pld	W	D	L	GF	GA	GD	BP	Pts	Qualification or relegation
1	Yverdon-Sport	14	9	3	2	33	14	+19	15	45	Remain in NLB
2	Delémont	14	7	5	2	34	12	+22	18	44	Remain in NLB
3	FC Schaffhausen	14	5	5	4	17	17	0	17	37	Remain in NLB
4	Wil	14	4	5	5	23	17	+6	17	34	Remain in NLB
5	Locarno	14	5	1	8	17	24	−7	17	33	Remain in NLB
6	Thun	14	8	3	3	17	12	+5	4	31	Remain in NLB
7	Winterthur	14	4	3	7	17	22	−5	8	23	Relegated to 1. Liga
8	SV Schaffhausen	14	1	1	12	11	51	−40	5	9	Relegated to 1. Liga

Source: RSSSF
Rules for classification: 1) points; 2) Position in the qualification.

== Attendances ==
#	Club	Average
1	Basel	10,128
2	St. Gallen	9,474
3	Sion	9,094
4	Zürich	8,161
5	GCZ	7,653
6	Luzern	7,219
7	Lausanne	6,598
8	Xamax	6,317
9	Servette	5,305
10	Aarau	4,267
11	Kriens	3,081
12	Carouge	1,827

== Sources ==
- Switzerland 1997–98 at RSSSF
