= 1998–99 Nationalliga A =

Swiss football season

Nationalliga A
- Season: 1998–99
- Champions: Servette; 17th title
- Relegated: Sion; Young Boys
- Top goalscorer: Alexandre Rey (19 goals)

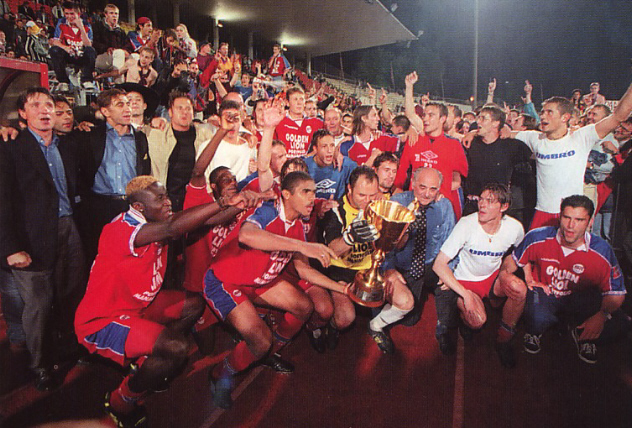
1999 Championship Title Trophy Presentation

Teams in the Swiss National League A played 22 games in the 1998–99 football season, with an eight-team playoff.

== Overview ==
The Qualification Round to the League season 2001–02 was contested by twelve teams. The first eight teams of the First Stage (or Qualification) were then to compete in the Championship Playoff Round. The teams in ninth to twelfth position completed with the top four teams of the Nationalliga B in a Nationalliga A/B Playoff round.

== Nationalliga A ==
At the end of the season Servette won the championship.

=== Qualification phase ===
==== Table ====
Pos	Team	Pld	W	D	L	GF	GA	GD	Pts	Qualification
1	Servette	22	12	8	2	38	24	+14	44	Advance to championship round halved points (rounded up) as bonus
2	Grasshopper Club	22	11	5	6	37	25	+12	38	Advance to championship round halved points (rounded up) as bonus
3	Zürich	22	10	8	4	33	21	+12	38	Advance to championship round halved points (rounded up) as bonus
4	Lausanne-Sport	22	10	8	4	36	33	+3	38	Advance to championship round halved points (rounded up) as bonus
5	Xamax	22	7	11	4	30	23	+7	32	Advance to championship round halved points (rounded up) as bonus
6	Basel	22	8	4	10	21	34	−13	28	Advance to championship round halved points (rounded up) as bonus
7	Luzern	22	6	9	7	26	25	+1	27	Advance to championship round halved points (rounded up) as bonus
8	St. Gallen	22	7	6	9	31	31	0	27	Advance to championship round halved points (rounded up) as bonus
9	Sion	22	5	8	9	22	36	−14	23	Continue to promotion/relegation round
10	Lugano	22	5	7	10	35	43	−8	22	Continue to promotion/relegation round
11	Young Boys	22	4	7	11	33	34	−1	19	Continue to promotion/relegation round
12	Aarau	22	3	7	12	28	41	−13	16	Continue to promotion/relegation round

Source: rsssf.com
Rules for classification: 1) points; 2) goal difference; 3) number of goals scored.

==== Results ====
Home \ Away	AAR	BAS	GCZ	LS	LUG	LUZ	NX	SER	SIO	STG	YB	ZÜR
Aarau		5–0	0–3	2–2	2–0	0–0	0–2	1–4	2–2	2–6	1–1	0–2
Basel	1–0		1–1	1–1	1–3	1–0	2–0	0–2	0–0	1–0	1–1	2–1
Grasshopper	2–0	2–1		2–2	3–2	2–0	1–1	3–0	4–1	4–1	2–1	1–2
Lausanne-Sport	2–1	0–2	3–1		3–2	2–2	1–0	0–0	2–1	1–0	1–0	1–1
Lugano	0–2	5–1	1–1	1–2		0–3 (Note: Match awarded.)	4–3	3–3	2–2	2–2	2–2	0–0
Luzern	2–2	4–1	1–0	1–0	1–2		1–1	0–0	1–2	1–1	0–0	3–2
Neuchâtel Xamax	0–0	3–1	0–2	4–1	1–0	1–1		1–1	3–1	2–0	1–1	1–1
Servette	3–2	3–1	2–0	2–2	1–0	3–2	1–1		2–1	1–0	0–1	3–1
Sion	3–2	1–0	0–1	0–4	2–0	0–0	1–1	2–2		2–1	1–1	0–0
St. Gallen	4–3	0–1	3–1	0–1	4–4	2–1	0–0	0–0	2–0		3–1	0–0
Young Boys	1–1	1–2	3–1	7–2	0–1	1–2	2–3	3–4	3–0	0–1		1–2
Zürich	1–0	1–0	0–0	3–3	4–1	2–0	1–1	0–1	3–0	3–1	3–2	

Legend: Blue = home team win; Yellow = draw; Red = away team win.

=== Championship round ===
The first eight teams of the qualification phase competed in the Championship round. The teams took half of the points (rounded up to complete units) gained in the qualification as bonus with them.

==== Table ====
Pos	Team	Pld	W	D	L	GF	GA	GD	BP	Pts	Qualification
1	Servette	14	7	3	4	19	14	+5	22	46	Swiss champions, qualified for Champions League third qualifying round
2	Grasshopper Club	14	8	3	3	31	11	+20	19	46	qualified for UEFA Cup qualifying round
3	Lausanne-Sport	14	8	2	4	28	20	+8	19	45	Swiss Cup winners, qualified for UEFA Cup first round
4	Zürich	14	7	2	5	24	15	+9	19	42	qualified for UEFA Cup qualifying round
5	Basel	14	5	4	5	18	19	−1	14	33	qualified for Intertoto Cup first round
6	Xamax	14	2	6	6	12	27	−15	16	28	qualified for Intertoto Cup first round
7	Luzern	14	4	2	8	13	27	−14	14	28	
8	St. Gallen	14	2	4	8	13	25	−12	14	24	

Source: rsssf.com
Rules for classification: 1) points; 2) Position in the qualification.

==== Results ====
Home \ Away	BAS	GCZ	LS	LUZ	NX	SER	STG	ZÜR
Basel		2–0	1–2	1–1	1–0	0–0	3–3	1–0
Grasshopper	4–2		5–0	4–0	5–0	0–1	4–0	0–2
Lausanne-Sport	3–0	2–3		5–1	4–0	2–5	4–1	3–1
Luzern	0–2	1–4	0–1		2–0	2–1	2–1	1–3
Neuchâtel Xamax	1–1	1–1	1–1	1–1		0–3	3–2	1–3
Servette	2–1	0–0	2–0	1–0	1–2		2–0	1–1
St. Gallen	1–2	0–0	0–0	0–2	0–0	2–0		1–3
Zürich	2–1	0–1	0–1	3–0	2–2	4–0	0–2	

Legend: Blue = home team win; Yellow = draw; Red = away team win.

== Nationalliga B ==
=== Qualification phase ===
==== Table ====
Pos	Team	Pld	W	D	L	GF	GA	GD	Pts	Qualification or relegation
1	Wil	22	12	7	3	45	27	+18	43	Advance to promotion/relegation NLA/LNB round
2	Delémont	22	12	4	6	43	27	+16	40	Advance to promotion/relegation NLA/LNB round
3	Étoile Carouge	22	11	7	4	29	19	+10	40	Advance to promotion/relegation NLA/LNB round
4	Yverdon-Sport	22	11	4	7	33	28	+5	37	Advance to promotion/relegation NLA/LNB round
5	Schaffhausen	22	10	5	7	36	31	+5	35	Continue to relegation round NLB/1. Liga halved points (rounded up) as bonus
6	Kriens	22	9	7	6	30	29	+1	34	Continue to relegation round NLB/1. Liga halved points (rounded up) as bonus
7	Locarno	22	8	4	10	21	26	−5	28	Continue to relegation round NLB/1. Liga halved points (rounded up) as bonus
8	Thun	22	6	7	9	28	33	−5	25	Continue to relegation round NLB/1. Liga halved points (rounded up) as bonus
9	Stade Nyonnais	22	4	10	8	33	36	−3	22	Continue to relegation round NLB/1. Liga halved points (rounded up) as bonus
10	Baden	22	6	4	12	31	36	−5	22	Continue to relegation round NLB/1. Liga halved points (rounded up) as bonus
11	Solothurn	22	4	6	12	27	40	−13	18	Continue to relegation round NLB/1. Liga halved points (rounded up) as bonus
12	Chiasso	22	2	9	11	14	38	−24	15	Continue to relegation round NLB/1. Liga halved points (rounded up) as bonus

Source: rsssf.com
Rules for classification: 1) Points; 2) Goal difference; 3) Goals scored; 4) Head-to-head points; 5) Away goals scored; 6) Draw.

=== Promotion/relegation group NLA/NLB ===
The teams in the ninth to twelfth positions in Nationalliga A competed with the top four teams of Nationalliga B in a Nationalliga A/B promotion/relegation round.

==== Table ====
Pos	Team	Pld	W	D	L	GF	GA	GD	Pts	Qualification
1	Lugano	14	9	2	3	19	10	+9	29	Remain in NLA
2	Delémont	14	7	2	5	23	20	+3	23	Promoted to NLA
3	Yverdon-Sport	14	6	3	5	22	17	+5	21	Promoted to NLA
4	Aarau	14	6	2	6	24	24	0	20	Remain in NLA
5	Sion	14	6	1	7	16	17	−1	19	Relegated to NLB
6	Young Boys	14	5	2	7	25	31	−6	17	Relegated to NLB
7	Wil	14	5	1	8	26	30	−4	16	Remain in NLB
8	Étoile Carouge	14	4	3	7	18	24	−6	15	Remain in NLB

Source: RSSSF
Rules for classification: 1) Points; 2) Goal difference; 3) Goals scored; 4) Head-to-head points; 5) Away goals scored; 6) Draw.

==== Results ====
Home \ Away	AAR	DEL	ÉTO	LUG	SIO	YB	YS	WIL
Aarau		1–3	3–1	0–1	4–1	1–1	2–1	3–1
Delémont	2–1		1–1	1–2	1–0	5–3	0–0	1–2
Étoile Carouge	3–1	1–2		0–2	2–1	1–3	2–1	1–3
Lugano	1–2	2–1	1–1		1–0	2–0	1–1	1–0
Sion	1–1	3–0	1–0	0–2		3–1	2–1	2–0
Young Boys	4–1	0–1	1–1	0–3	3–1		1–2	3–2
Yverdon-Sport	2–1	3–1	1–0	1–0	0–1	5–1		1–4
Wil	2–3	1–4	3–4	3–0	1–0	3–4	1–1	

Legend: Blue = home team win; Yellow = draw; Red = away team win.

=== Relegation group NLB/1. Liga ===
The last eight teams of the qualification phase competed in the relegation group against relegation to the 1. Liga. The teams took half of the points (rounded up to complete units) gained in the qualification as bonus with them.

==== Table ====
Pos	Team	Pld	W	D	L	GF	GA	GD	BP	Pts	Qualification or relegation
1	Baden	14	7	4	3	25	18	+7	11	36	Remain in NLB
2	Thun	14	6	4	4	30	20	+10	13	35	Remain in NLB
3	Stade Nyonnais	14	7	3	4	29	22	+7	11	35	Remain in NLB
4	Kriens	14	5	3	6	19	18	+1	17	35	Remain in NLB
5	Schaffhausen	14	4	2	8	15	25	−10	18	32	Remain in NLB
6	Solothurn	14	5	6	3	20	19	+1	9	30	Remain in NLB
7	Locarno	14	3	3	8	14	29	−15	14	26	Relegated to 1. Liga
8	Chiasso	14	3	7	4	14	15	−1	8	24	Relegated to 1. Liga

Source: RSSSF
Rules for classification: 1) points; 2) Position in the qualification.

== Attendances ==
#	Club	Average
1	Basel	8,141
2	GCZ	7,767
3	St. Gallen	7,256
4	Xamax	6,978
5	Sion	6,242
6	Luzern	6,190
7	Lausanne	6,136
8	Zürich	5,596
9	Servette	5,513
10	Young Boys	4,755
11	Lugano	2,706
12	Aarau	2,705

== Sources ==
- Switzerland 1998–99 at RSSSF
