= SR Delémont =

Swiss football club

- Full name: Sport-Réunis de Delémont
- Founded: 1909; 117 years ago
- Ground: La Blancherie
- Capacity: 5,263 (600 seated)
- Chairman: Patrick Fleury
- Manager: Anthony Sirufo
- League: 1st League Classic
- 2024–25: Promotion League, 18th of 18 (relegated)
- Website: https://srd.ch
Home colours	Away colours

Sport-Réunis de Delémont (shortened to SR Delémont) is a Swiss football club based in Delémont and founded in 1909. The team currently play in 1st League Classic from 2025 to 2026, the fourth tier of Swiss football after relegation from Promotion League in 2024–25. It played in the Swiss Super League in the 2000–01 and 2002–03 seasons.

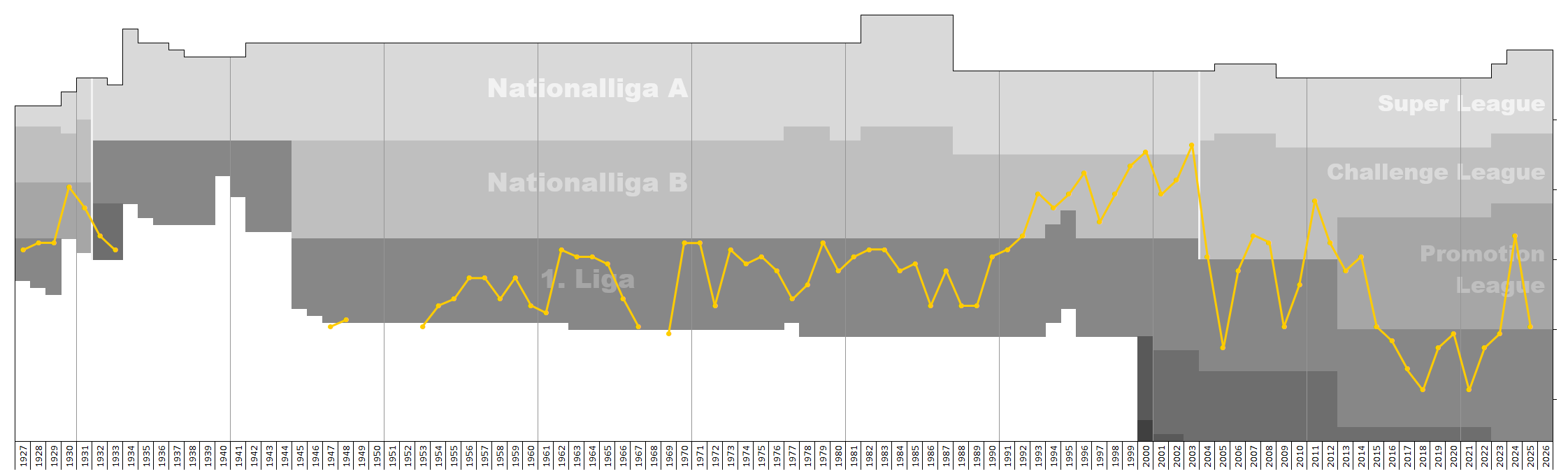
Chart of SR Delemont table positions in the Swiss football league system

== History ==
In 2022–23 season, SR Delémont secure promotion to Promotion League from 2023 to 2024 after defeat Black Stars Basel 3–2 and return to third tier after seven years absence.

On 24 May 2025, SR Delémont secure relegation to 1st League Classic after draw against SC Brühl 1–1 in final matchweek and ended two years stint at third tier.

== Honours ==
- 1. Liga Classic
  - Winner: 2022–23 (Group 2)

== Current squad ==
As of 10 April, 2026.

Note: Flags indicate national team as defined under FIFA eligibility rules; some limited exceptions apply. Players may hold more than one non-FIFA nationality.

No.	Pos.	Nation	Player
1	GK	SUI	Cyril Schwendimann
2	MF	SUI	Romain Baume
4	DF	FRA	Jordan Perrony
5	MF	SUI	Florent Hushi
6	MF	SUI	Anthony Boldini
7	FW	SUI	Ydris Regaia
8	MF	ITA	Kelio Martella
9	FW	SUI	Glenn Mbazo
10	MF	FRA	Mohamed Boukaoui
11	FW	SUI	Fares Toumi
13	DF	SUI	Seyf Toumi
14	FW	GUI	Sekouna Camara
16	DF	ESP	Georges Gomis

No.	Pos.	Nation	Player
17	FW	FRA	Alan Dzabana
18	FW	FRA	Yoroma Jatta
19	MF	SUI	Noé Florido
20	MF	SUI	Robin Hushi
21	MF	SUI	Noha Sylvestre
22	DF	FRA	Nolan Géraud
23	MF	SUI	Samuel Ferreira
24	GK	SUI	Maël Zaugg
25	DF	FRA	Abdoulaye Koté
26	DF	SUI	Brian Conceicao
27	MF	FRA	Adam Assmy
28	GK	SUI	Quentin Burkhalter
