= Guy Mathez =

Swiss football manager

Personal information
- Date of birth: 4 April 1946 (age 80)
- Position: Forward

Senior career*
Years	Team	Apps	(Gls)
1966–1968	FC Moutier		
1968–1972	FC Sion		
1972–1975	Neuchâtel Xamax		
1975–1978	Lausanne-Sport		
1978	Neuchâtel Xamax		
1979–1980	FC Sion		

Managerial career
- 1982–1985: Servette
- 1986–1987: Vevey-Sports
- 1997: Servette
- 1997–1999: FC Basel
- * Club domestic league appearances and goals

Guy Mathez (born 4 April 1946) is a Swiss former football player and manager. He coached Servette from 1982 until 1985 and FC Basel from 1997 until 1999.
