= PFC Levski Sofia in European football =

Bulgarian club in European football

Levski Sofia in European football
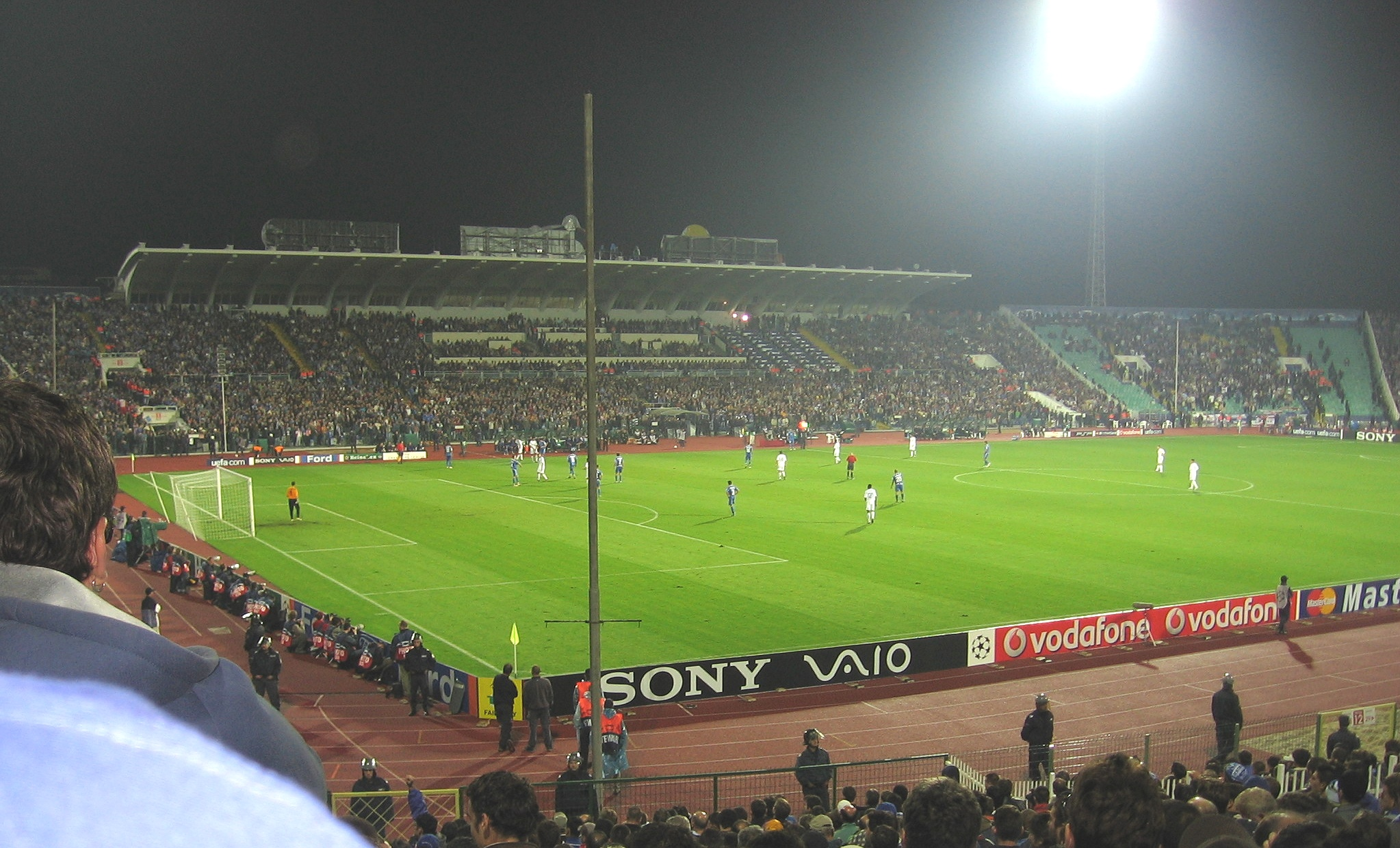
- Levski vs. Chelsea, UEFA Champions League, 27-09-2006
- Most appearances: (Bulgaria) Elin Topuzakov (65)
- Top scorer: (Bulgaria) Pavel Panov (22)
- First entry: 1958 Mitropa Cup
- Latest entry: 2026–27 UEFA Europa League

This article lists the results of Levski Sofia in Еuropean competitions since the club's first participation in 1958.

The furthest stage Levski has reached is the quarter-finals of the Cup Winners' Cup in 1969–70, 1976–77 and 1986–87 and the quarter-finals of the UEFA Cup in 1975–76 and 2005–06.

Notable eliminations by Levski: Ajax, Dynamo Kyiv, Rangers, VfB Stuttgart (x2), Auxerre, Udinese, MSV Duisburg, Olympiacos, Dinamo București, Slavia Prague, Hajduk Split, Boavista, Brøndby, Djurgården, Śląsk Wrocław, PAOK, Hapoel Be'er Sheva (x2), Universitatea Craiova, St. Gallen.

Notable wins: Barcelona, Ajax, Marseille, Lazio, Atlético Madrid, Rangers, VfB Stuttgart, Sporting CP, Austria Wien, Olympiacos, Górnik Zabrze, Auxerre, Dynamo Berlin, MSV Duisburg, Udinese, Dinamo București, Fenerbahçe, Beşiktaş, Hajduk Split, Brøndby, Boavista, Śląsk Wrocław, Sturm Graz, Gent, AIK, Dnipro, Spartak Trnava, Željezničar, Vojvodina, Dinamo Minsk, Admira Wacker, Chievo, APOEL, PAOK, Hapoel Be'er Sheva, Universitatea Craiova, Velež Mostar.

== Total statistics ==
As of 18 August 2026

Levski Sofia record in European football by competition
Competition	S	P	W	D	L	GF	GA	GD
UEFA Champions League / European Cup	16	65	19	17	29	84	85	–1
UEFA Cup Winners' Cup / European Cup Winners' Cup	11	36	14	5	17	70	55	+15
UEFA Europa League / UEFA Cup	27	116	41	28	47	145	152	–7
UEFA Conference League / UEFA Europa Conference League	3	14	7	3	4	15	13	+2
UEFA Intertoto Cup	1	6	2	2	2	12	11	+1
Balkans Cup	3	23	8	8	7	35	24	+11
Mitropa Cup	1	2	1	0	1	1	5	–4
Intertoto Cup Ernst Thommen	1	4	3	0	1	12	5	+7
Total	63	266	95	63	108	374	350	+24

== Player and coach statistics ==
As of 4 August 2026

=== Most European appearances (player) ===
No.	Name	Appearances
1	(Bulgaria) Elin Topuzakov	65
2	(Bulgaria) Dimitar Telkiyski	53
3	(Bulgaria) Georgi Petkov	50
3	(Bulgaria) Hristo Yovov	50
5	(Bulgaria) Stanislav Angelov	47
6	(Bulgaria) Stefan Aladzhov	40
7	(Bulgaria) Zhivko Milanov	39
8	(Bulgaria) Daniel Borimirov	36
8	(Bulgaria) Dimitar Ivankov	36
8	(Bulgaria) Pavel Panov	36
8	(Bulgaria) (Brazil) Lúcio Wagner	36

=== Most goals scored in European competitions ===
No.	Name	Goals
1	(Bulgaria) Pavel Panov	22
2	(Bulgaria) Kiril Milanov	17
3	(Bulgaria) Georgi Ivanov	16
4	(Bulgaria) Georgi Asparuhov	12
4	(Bulgaria) Emil Spasov	12
6	(Bulgaria) Nasko Sirakov	9
7	(Bulgaria) Emil Angelov	8
7	(Mali) Garra Dembélé	8
9	(Bulgaria) Hristo Yovov	7
10	(Bulgaria) Georgi Chilikov	6
10	(Serbia and Montenegro) Saša Simonović	6
10	(Bulgaria) Dimitar Telkiyski	6

=== Most European appearances (coach) ===
No.	Name	Appearances
1	(Bulgaria) Stanimir Stoilov	34
2	(Bulgaria) Ivan Vutsov	18
3	(Serbia) Ljupko Petrović	14
4	(Bulgaria) Vasil Metodiev	13
4	(Spain) **Julio Velázquez**	13
6	(Bulgaria) Yasen Petrov	12
6	(Czechoslovakia) Rudolf Vytlačil	12
8	(Bulgaria) Georgi Vasilev	11
9	(Serbia) Slavoljub Muslin	8
10	(Bulgaria) Yoncho Arsov	6
10	(Serbia) Ratko Dostanić	6
10	(Bulgaria) Nikolay Kostov	6
10	(Bulgaria) Nikolay Mitov	6
10	(Bulgaria) Vasil Spasov	6

Coach in bold is active for Levski.

== Statistics by country ==
As of 8 October 2026

Country	Club	P	W	D	L	GF	GA	GD
Andorra	Sant Julià	2	2	0	0	9	0	+9
Subtotal		2	2	0	0	9	0	+9
Austria	Sturm Graz	2	1	0	1	1	1	0
Austria	Austria Wien	2	1	0	1	3	4	–1
Austria	Red Bull Salzburg	3	0	0	3	0	3	–3
Subtotal		7	2	0	5	4	8	–4
Azerbaijan	Sabah	2	2	0	0	3	0	+3
Azerbaijan	Baku	2	1	1	0	2	0	+2
Subtotal		4	3	1	0	5	0	+5
Belarus	Lokomotiv Vitebsk	2	1	1	0	9	2	+7
Belarus	BATE Borisov	2	0	1	1	1	2	–1
Subtotal		4	1	2	1	10	4	+6
Belgium	Gent	2	1	0	1	3	3	0
Belgium	Antwerp	2	0	1	1	3	4	–1
Belgium	Beveren	2	0	1	1	1	2	–1
Belgium	Eendracht Aalst	2	0	0	2	1	3	–2
Subtotal		8	1	2	5	8	12	–4
Bosnia and Herzegovina / (Socialist Federal Republic of Yugoslavia) SFR Yugoslavia	Modriča	2	2	0	0	8	0	+8
Bosnia and Herzegovina / (Socialist Federal Republic of Yugoslavia) SFR Yugoslavia	Borac Banja Luka	2	1	1	0	5	1	+4
Bosnia and Herzegovina / (Socialist Federal Republic of Yugoslavia) SFR Yugoslavia	Željezničar	2	1	1	0	4	0	+4
Bosnia and Herzegovina / (Socialist Federal Republic of Yugoslavia) SFR Yugoslavia	Velež Mostar	2	1	0	1	5	4	+1
Bosnia and Herzegovina / (Socialist Federal Republic of Yugoslavia) SFR Yugoslavia	Sarajevo	2	1	0	1	2	3	–1
Subtotal		10	6	2	2	24	8	+16
Croatia	Hajduk Split	4	1	1	2	4	3	+1
Subtotal		4	1	1	2	4	3	+1
Cyprus	APOEL	2	1	1	0	2	0	+2
Cyprus	AEK Larnaca	2	0	0	2	0	7	–7
Subtotal		4	1	1	2	2	7	–5
Czech Republic	Slavia Prague	2	0	2	0	2	2	0
Czech Republic	Viktoria Plzen	1	1	0	0	2	1	+1
Subtotal		3	1	2	0	3	2	+1
Denmark	Brøndby	2	1	1	0	5	2	+3
Denmark	Boldklubben 1903	2	1	0	1	2	1	+1
Denmark	Copenhagen	2	0	0	2	1	6	–5
Subtotal		6	2	1	3	8	9	–1
England	Chelsea	4	0	0	4	1	10	–9
England	Watford	2	0	1	1	2	4	–2
England	Liverpool	2	0	0	2	2	6	–4
Subtotal		8	0	1	7	5	20	–15
Finland	Reipas Lahti	2	2	0	0	19	3	+16
Finland	Tampere United	2	0	0	2	0	2	–2
Subtotal		4	2	0	2	19	5	+14
France	Auxerre	2	1	0	1	2	2	0
France	Lille	2	0	1	1	2	3	–1
France	Marseille	1	1	0	0	1	0	+1
Subtotal		5	2	1	2	5	5	0
(Georgia (country)) Georgia	Sioni Bolnisi	2	2	0	0	4	0	+4
Subtotal		2	2	0	0	4	0	+4
Germany / East Germany / West Germany	VfB Stuttgart	4	1	3	0	5	4	+1
Germany / East Germany / West Germany	Werder Bremen	4	0	1	3	2	8	–6
Germany / East Germany / West Germany	MSV Duisburg	2	1	0	1	4	4	0
Germany / East Germany / West Germany	Dynamo Berlin	2	1	0	1	2	3	–1
Germany / East Germany / West Germany	Schalke 04	2	0	1	1	2	4	–2
Germany / East Germany / West Germany	Eintracht Frankfurt	2	0	1	1	1	3	–2
Subtotal		15	3	6	7	16	26	–10
Greece	AEK Athens	2	0	1	1	0	4	-4
Greece	PAOK	2	1	1	0	3	1	+2
Greece	Olympiacos	2	1	0	1	4	3	+1
Greece	OFI	2	1	0	1	2	3	–1
Subtotal		8	3	2	3	9	11	-2
Hungary	Debrecen	2	0	0	2	1	4	–3
Hungary	Ferencváros	2	0	0	2	3	7	–4
Hungary	Újpest	2	0	0	2	1	7	–6
Subtotal		6	0	0	6	5	18	–13
Iceland	ÍBV	2	2	0	0	8	0	+8
Subtotal		2	2	0	0	8	0	+8
Israel	Hapoel Be'er Sheva	4	1	3	0	3	2	+1
Israel	Hapoel Ramat Gan	2	2	0	0	5	0	+5
Subtotal		6	3	3	0	8	2	+6
Italy	Milan	6	0	2	4	5	17	–12
Italy	Chievo	2	1	1	0	4	2	+2
Italy	Udinese	2	1	1	0	2	1	+1
Italy	Lazio	2	1	0	1	1	4	–3
Italy	Juventus	2	0	1	1	2	4	–2
Subtotal		14	3	5	6	14	28	–14
Kazakhstan	Atyrau	2	2	0	0	6	1	+5
Kazakhstan	Irtysh	2	0	1	1	0	2	–2
Kazakhstan	Kaïrat Almaty	2	2	0	0	2	0	+2
Subtotal		6	4	1	1	8	3	+5
Latvia	Skonto	2	1	1	0	2	0	+2
Subtotal		2	1	1	0	2	0	+2
Liechtenstein	Vaduz	2	1	0	1	3	3	0
Subtotal		2	1	0	1	3	3	0
Luxembourg	F91 Dudelange	2	2	0	0	6	0	+6
Subtotal		2	2	0	0	6	0	+6
Malta	Hamrun Spartans	2	1	0	1	2	2	0
Subtotal		2	1	0	1	2	2	0
Montenegro	Sutjeska	2	1	1	0	3	1	+2
Subtotal		2	1	1	0	3	1	+2
Netherlands	Ajax	4	1	0	3	5	7	–2
Netherlands	AZ	4	0	1	3	2	12	–10
Netherlands	Sparta Rotterdam	2	0	1	1	1	3	–2
Netherlands	Heerenveen	1	0	0	1	1	2	–1
Netherlands	NEC Nijmegen	1	0	1	0	1	1	0
Subtotal		12	1	3	8	10	25	–15
North Macedonia	Shkupi	2	2	0	0	3	0	+3
Subtotal		2	2	0	0	3	0	+3
Norway	Brann	2	0	2	0	1	1	0
Subtotal		2	0	2	0	1	1	0
Poland	Śląsk Wrocław	2	1	1	0	5	2	+3
Poland	Górnik Zabrze	2	1	0	1	4	4	0
Subtotal		4	2	1	1	9	6	+3
Portugal	Boavista	2	1	0	1	3	3	0
Portugal	Sporting CP	2	1	0	1	1	5	–4
Portugal	Benfica	2	0	1	1	4	5	–1
Portugal	Braga	2	0	1	1	0	1	–1
Subtotal		8	2	2	4	8	14	–6
Republic of Ireland	Dundalk	2	2	0	0	8	0	+8
Subtotal		2	2	0	0	8	0	+8
Romania	Dinamo București	5	3	1	1	5	5	0
Romania	Universitatea Cluj	2	1	0	1	6	5	+1
Romania	Universitatea Craiova	2	1	1	0	3	2	+1
Subtotal		9	5	2	2	14	12	+2
Russia	CSKA Moscow	1	0	0	1	1	2	–1
Subtotal		1	0	0	1	1	2	–1
Scotland	Rangers	2	1	0	1	4	4	0
Subtotal		2	1	0	1	4	4	0
Slovakia	Ružomberok	2	2	0	0	4	0	+4
Slovakia	Artmedia Bratislava	2	2	0	0	3	0	+3
Slovakia	Spartak Trnava	2	1	0	1	3	3	0
Slovakia	Slovan Bratislava	2	0	1	1	2	3	–1
Slovakia	Žilina	2	0	1	1	1	2	–1
Subtotal		10	5	2	3	13	8	+5
Slovenia	Olimpija Ljubljana	4	1	0	3	4	6	–2
Slovenia	Publikum	2	1	0	1	3	1	+2
Slovenia	Maribor	2	0	2	0	1	1	0
Subtotal		8	2	2	4	8	8	0
Spain	Barcelona	4	1	0	3	5	15	–10
Spain	Atlético Madrid	2	1	0	1	2	3	–1
Spain	Real Madrid	2	0	0	2	0	3	–3
Spain	Villarreal	2	0	0	2	0	3	–3
Spain	Zaragoza	2	0	0	2	0	4	–4
Spain	Sevilla	2	0	0	2	1	6	–5
Subtotal		14	2	0	12	8	34	–26
Sweden	Kalmar FF	2	1	1	0	6	3	+3
Sweden	AIK	2	1	1	0	2	1	+1
Sweden	Djurgårdens IF	2	1	0	1	7	2	+5
Subtotal		6	3	2	1	15	6	+9
Switzerland	St. Gallen	2	1	1	0	4	0	+4
Switzerland	Luzern	2	1	0	1	2	2	0
Subtotal		4	2	1	1	6	2	+4
Turkey	Eskişehirspor	2	2	0	0	7	1	+6
Turkey	Galatasaray	2	0	1	1	2	3	–1
Turkey	Beşiktaş	2	0	1	1	1	2	–1
Subtotal		6	2	2	2	10	6	+3
Ukraine / Soviet Union	Dynamo Kyiv	4	0	2	2	1	3	–2
Ukraine / Soviet Union	Dnipro	2	1	0	1	3	3	0
Subtotal		6	1	2	3	4	6	–2

== Results by matches ==
Season	Competition	Round	Club	Home	Away	Aggregate
1965–66	European Cup	Preliminary round	(Sweden) Djurgårdens IF	6–0	1–2	7–2
1965–66	European Cup	First round	(Portugal) Benfica	2–2	2–3	4–5
1967–68	European Cup Winners' Cup	First round	(Italy) Milan	1–1	1–5	2–6
1969–70	European Cup Winners' Cup	First round	(Iceland) ÍBV	4–0	4–0	8–0
1969–70	European Cup Winners' Cup	Second round	(Switzerland) St. Gallen	4–0	0–0	4–0
1969–70	European Cup Winners' Cup	Quarter-finals	(Poland) Górnik Zabrze	3–2	1–2	4–4 (a)
1970–71	European Cup	Preliminary round	Austria Wien	3–1	0–3	3–4
1971–72	European Cup Winners' Cup	First round	(Netherlands) Sparta Rotterdam	1–1	0–2	1–3
1972–73	UEFA Cup	First round	(Romania) Universitatea Cluj	5–1	1–4	6–5
1972–73	UEFA Cup	Second round	(East Germany) Dynamo Berlin	2–0	0–3	2–3
1974–75	European Cup	First round	(Hungary) Újpesti Dózsa	0–3	1–4	1–7
1975–76	UEFA Cup	First round	(Turkey) Eskişehirspor	3–0	4–1	7–1
1975–76	UEFA Cup	Second round	(West Germany) MSV Duisburg	2–1	2–3	4–4 (a)
1975–76	UEFA Cup	Third round	(Netherlands) Ajax	2–1 (a.e.t.)	1–2	3–3 (5–3 p)
1975–76	UEFA Cup	Quarter–finals	(Spain) Barcelona	5–4	0–4	5–8
1976–77	European Cup Winners' Cup	First round	(Finland) Reipas Lahti	12–2	7–1	19–3
1976–77	European Cup Winners' Cup	Second round	(Portugal) Boavista	2–0	1–3	3–3 (a)
1976–77	European Cup Winners' Cup	Quarter-finals	(Spain) Atlético Madrid	2–1	0–2	2–3
1977–78	European Cup	First round	(Poland) Śląsk Wrocław	3–0	2–2	5–2
1977–78	European Cup	Second round	(Netherlands) Ajax	1–2	1–2	2–4
1978–79	UEFA Cup	First round	(Greece) Olympiacos	3–1 (a.e.t.)	1–2	4–3
1978–79	UEFA Cup	Second round	(Italy) Milan	1–1	0–3	1–4
1979–80	European Cup	First round	(Spain) Real Madrid	0–1	0–2	0–3
1980–81	UEFA Cup	First round	(Soviet Union) Dynamo Kyiv	0–0	1–1	1–1 (a)
1980–81	UEFA Cup	Second round	(Netherlands) AZ	1–1	0–5	1–6
1981–82	UEFA Cup	First round	(Romania) Dinamo București	2–1	0–3	2–4
1982–83	UEFA Cup	First round	(Spain) Sevilla	0–3	1–3	1–6
1983–84	UEFA Cup	First round	(West Germany) Stuttgart	1–0	1–1	2–1
1983–84	UEFA Cup	Second round	(England) Watford	1–3 (a.e.t.)	1–1	2–4
1984–85	European Cup	First round	(West Germany) Stuttgart	1–1	2–2	3–3 (a)
1984–85	European Cup	Second round	(Soviet Union) Dnipro	3–1	0–2	3–3 (a)
1986–87	European Cup Winners' Cup	First round	(Denmark) B 1903	2–0	0–1	2–1
1986–87	European Cup Winners' Cup	Second round	(Socialist Federal Republic of Yugoslavia) Velež Mostar	2–0	3–4	5–4
1986–87	European Cup Winners' Cup	Quarter-finals	(Spain) Zaragoza	0–2	0–2	0–4
1987–88	European Cup Winners' Cup	First round	(Greece) OFI Crete	1–0	1–3	2–3
1988–89	European Cup	First round	(Italy) Milan	0–2	2–5	2–7
1989–90	UEFA Cup	First round	(Belgium) Royal Antwerp	0–0	3–4	3–4
1991–92	European Cup Winners' Cup	First round	(Hungary) Ferencváros	2–3	1–4	3–7
1992–93	European Cup Winners' Cup	First round	(Switzerland) Luzern	2–1	0–1	2–2 (a)
1993–94	UEFA Champions League	First round	(Scotland) Rangers	2–1	2–3	4–4 (a)
1993–94	UEFA Champions League	Second round	(Germany) Werder Bremen	2–2	0–1	2–3
1994–95	UEFA Cup	Preliminary round	(Slovenia) Olimpija Ljubljana	1–2	2–3	3–5
1995–96	UEFA Cup	Preliminary round	(Romania) Dinamo București	1–1 (a.e.t.)	1–0	2–1
1995–96	UEFA Cup	First round	(Belgium) Eendracht Aalst	1–2	0–1	1–3
1996–97	UEFA Cup Winners' Cup	Qualifying round	(Slovenia) Olimpija Ljubljana	1–0 (a.e.t.)	0–1	1–1 (2–4 p)
1997–98	UEFA Cup Winners' Cup	Qualifying round	(Slovakia) Slovan Bratislava	1–1	1–2	2–3
1998–99	UEFA Cup Winners' Cup	Qualifying round	(Belarus) Lokomotiv Vitebsk	8–1	1–1	9–2
1998–99	UEFA Cup Winners' Cup	First round	(Denmark) Copenhagen	0–2	1–4	1–6
1999–2000	UEFA Cup	Qualifying round	(Cyprus) APOEL	2–0	0–0	2–0
1999–2000	UEFA Cup	First round	(Croatia) Hajduk Split	3–0	0–0	3–0
1999–2000	UEFA Cup	Second round	(Italy) Juventus	1–3	1–1	2–4
2000–01	UEFA Champions League	First qualifying round	(Luxembourg) F91 Dudelange	2–0	4–0	6–0
2000–01	UEFA Champions League	Second qualifying round	(Turkey) Beşiktaş	1–1	0–1	1–2
2001–02	UEFA Champions League	First qualifying round	(Bosnia and Herzegovina) Željezničar	4–0	0–0	4–0
2001–02	UEFA Champions League	Second qualifying round	(Norway) Brann	0–0	1–1	1–1 (a)
2001–02	UEFA Champions League	Third qualifying round	(Turkey) Galatasaray	1–1	1–2	2–3
2001–02	UEFA Cup	First round	(England) Chelsea	0–2	0–3	0–5
2002–03	UEFA Champions League	Second qualifying round	(Latvia) Skonto	2–0	0–0	2–0
2002–03	UEFA Champions League	Third qualifying round	(Ukraine) Dynamo Kyiv	0–1	0–1	0–2
2002–03	UEFA Cup	First round	(Denmark) Brøndby	4–1	1–1	5–2
2002–03	UEFA Cup	Second round	(Austria) Sturm Graz	1–0 (a.e.t.)	0–1	1–1 (7–8 p)
2003–04	UEFA Cup	Qualifying round	(Kazakhstan) Atyrau	2–0	4–1	6–1
2003–04	UEFA Cup	First round	(Israel) Hapoel Ramat Gan	4–0	1–0	5–0
2003–04	UEFA Cup	Second round	(Czech Republic) Slavia Prague	0–0	2–2	2–2 (a)
2003–04	UEFA Cup	Third round	(England) Liverpool	2–4	0–2	2–6
2004–05	UEFA Cup	Second qualifying round	(Bosnia and Herzegovina) Modriča	5–0	3–0	8–0
2004–05	UEFA Cup	First round	(Belgium) Beveren	1–1	0–1	1–2
2005–06	UEFA Cup	Second qualifying round	(Slovenia) Publikum	3–0	0–1	3–1
2005–06	UEFA Cup	First round	(France) Auxerre	1–0	1–2	2–2 (a)
2005–06	UEFA Cup	Group stage (F)	(Romania) Dinamo București	1–0	—N/a	2nd place
2005–06	UEFA Cup	Group stage (F)	(Russia) CSKA Moscow	—N/a	1–2	2nd place
2005–06	UEFA Cup	Group stage (F)	(France) Marseille	1–0	—N/a	2nd place
2005–06	UEFA Cup	Group stage (F)	(Netherlands) Heerenveen	—N/a	1–2	2nd place
2005–06	UEFA Cup	Round of 32	(Slovakia) Artmedia Bratislava	2–0	1–0	3–0
2005–06	UEFA Cup	Round of 16	(Italy) Udinese	2–1	0–0	2–1
2005–06	UEFA Cup	Quarter-finals	(Germany) Schalke 04	1–3	1–1	2–4
2006–07	UEFA Champions League	Second qualifying round	(Georgia (country)) Sioni Bolnisi	2–0	2–0	4–0
2006–07	UEFA Champions League	Third qualifying round	(Italy) Chievo	2–0	2–2	4–2
2006–07	UEFA Champions League	Group stage (A)	(Spain) Barcelona	0–2	0–5	4th place
2006–07	UEFA Champions League	Group stage (A)	(England) Chelsea	1–3	0–2	4th place
2006–07	UEFA Champions League	Group stage (A)	(Germany) Werder Bremen	0–3	0–2	4th place
2007–08	UEFA Champions League	Second qualifying round	(Finland) Tampere United	0–1	0–1	0–2
2008–09	UEFA Champions League	Third qualifying round	(Belarus) BATE Borisov	0–1	1–1	1–2
2008–09	UEFA Cup	First round	(Slovakia) Žilina	0–1	1–1	1–2
2009–10	UEFA Champions League	Second qualifying round	(Andorra) Sant Julià	4–0	5–0	9–0
2009–10	UEFA Champions League	Third qualifying round	(Azerbaijan) Baku	2–0	0–0	2–0
2009–10	UEFA Champions League	Play-off round	(Hungary) Debrecen	1–2	0–2	1–4
2009–10	UEFA Europa League	Group stage (G)	(Spain) Villarreal	0–2	0–1	4th place
2009–10	UEFA Europa League	Group stage (G)	(Italy) Lazio	0–4	1–0	4th place
2009–10	UEFA Europa League	Group stage (G)	(Austria) Red Bull Salzburg	0–1	0–1	4th place
2010–11	UEFA Europa League	Second qualifying round	(Republic of Ireland) Dundalk	6–0	2–0	8–0
2010–11	UEFA Europa League	Third qualifying round	(Sweden) Kalmar FF	5–2	1–1	6–3
2010–11	UEFA Europa League	Play-off round	(Sweden) AIK	2–1	0–0	2–1
2010–11	UEFA Europa League	Group stage (C)	(Belgium) Gent	3–2	0–1	4th place
2010–11	UEFA Europa League	Group stage (C)	(Portugal) Sporting CP	1–0	0–5	4th place
2010–11	UEFA Europa League	Group stage (C)	(France) Lille	2–2	0–1	4th place
2011–12	UEFA Europa League	Third qualifying round	(Slovakia) Spartak Trnava	2–1	1–2 (a.e.t.)	3–3 (4–5 p)
2012–13	UEFA Europa League	Second qualifying round	(Bosnia and Herzegovina) Sarajevo	1–0	1–3	2–3
2013–14	UEFA Europa League	First qualifying round	(Kazakhstan) Irtysh Pavlodar	0–0	0–2	0–2
2016–17	UEFA Europa League	Second qualifying round	(Slovenia) Maribor	1–1	0–0	1–1 (a)
2017–18	UEFA Europa League	First qualifying round	(Montenegro) Sutjeska Nikšić	3–1	0–0	3–1
2017–18	UEFA Europa League	Second qualifying round	(Croatia) Hajduk Split	1–2	0–1	1–3
2018–19	UEFA Europa League	First qualifying round	(Liechtenstein) Vaduz	3–2	0–1	3–3 (a)
2019–20	UEFA Europa League	First qualifying round	(Slovakia) Ružomberok	2–0	2–0	4–0
2019–20	UEFA Europa League	Second qualifying round	(Cyprus) AEK Larnaca	0–4	0–3	0–7
2022–23	UEFA Europa Conference League	Second qualifying round	(Greece) PAOK	2–0	1–1	3–1
2022–23	UEFA Europa Conference League	Third qualifying round	(Malta) Hamrun Spartans	1–2 (a.e.t.)	1–0	2–2 (1–4 p)
2023–24	UEFA Europa Conference League	Second qualifying round	(North Macedonia) Shkupi	1–0	2–0	3–0
2023–24	UEFA Europa Conference League	Third qualifying round	(Israel) Hapoel Be'er Sheva	2–1	0–0	2–1
2023–24	UEFA Europa Conference League	Play-off round	(Germany) Eintracht Frankfurt	1–1	0–2	1–3
2025–26	UEFA Europa League	First qualifying round	(Israel) Hapoel Be'er Sheva	0–0	1–1 (a.e.t.)	1–1 (3–1 p)
2025–26	UEFA Europa League	Second qualifying round	(Portugal) Braga	0–0	0–1 (a.e.t.)	0–1
2025–26	UEFA Conference League	Third qualifying round	(Azerbaijan) Sabah	1–0	2–0	3–0
2025–26	UEFA Conference League	Play-off round	(Netherlands) AZ	0–2	1–4	1–6
2026–27	UEFA Champions League	First qualifying round	(Bosnia and Herzegovina) Borac Banja Luka	4–0	1–1	5–1
2026–27	UEFA Champions League	Second qualifying round	(Romania) Universitatea Craiova	1–0	2–2	3–2
2026–27	UEFA Champions League	Third qualifying round	(Kazakhstan) Kairat	1–0	1–0	2–0
2026–27	UEFA Champions League	Play-off round	(Greece) AEK Athens	0–0	0–4	0–4
2026–27	UEFA Europa League	League phase	RB Salzburg	0-1		
2026–27	UEFA Europa League	League phase	NEC Nijmegen	1-1		
2026–27	UEFA Europa League	League phase	Viktoria Plzen			
2026–27	UEFA Europa League	League phase	Jagiellonia			
2026–27	UEFA Europa League	League phase	Olympique de Marseille			
2026–27	UEFA Europa League	League phase	Lillestrom			
2026–27	UEFA Europa League	League phase	AC Milan			
2026–27	UEFA Europa League	League phase	Sunderland			

== Match details ==
=== 1965–66 European Cup ===
12 September 1965 PR 1st leg	Djurgården (Sweden)	2–1	(Bulgaria) Levski Sofia	Stockholm, Sweden
	Nilsson 40', 63'	Report	Sokolov 8'	Stadium: Olympic Stadium; Attendance: 3,311; Referee: Joseph Hannet (Belgium)

3 October 1965 PR 2nd leg	Levski Sofia (Bulgaria)	6–0 (7–2 agg.)	(Sweden) Djurgården	Sofia, Bulgaria
	Asparuhov 13', 18'; Iliev 33', 47'; Nikolov 34'; Abadzhiev 58'	Report		Stadium: Levski Stadium; Attendance: 15,769; Referee: Dittmar Huber (Switzerland)

10 November 1965 1R 1st leg	Levski Sofia (Bulgaria)	2–2	(Portugal) Benfica	Sofia, Bulgaria
	Asparuhov 5'; Nikolov 59'	Report	Eusébio 22', 63'	Stadium: Levski Stadium; Attendance: 25,315; Referee: Gyula Gere (Hungary)

8 December 1965 1R 2nd leg	Benfica (Portugal)	3–2 (5–4 agg.)	(Bulgaria) Levski Sofia	Lisbon, Portugal
	Eusébio 6'; Coluna 28'; Torres 46'	Report	Asparuhov 3', 75'	Stadium: Estádio da Luz; Attendance: 39,992; Referee: Henri Faucheux (France)

=== 1967–68 European Cup Winners' Cup ===
20 September 1967 1R 1st leg	Milan (Italy)	5–1	(Bulgaria) Levski Sofia	Milan, Italy
	Sormani 50'; Hamrin 51', 74'; Anquilletti 81', 86'	Report	Asparuhov 62'	Stadium: San Siro; Attendance: 40,000; Referee: Konstantin Zečević (Yugoslavia)

10 November 1967 1R 2nd leg	Levski Sofia (Bulgaria)	1–1 (2–6 agg.)	(Italy) Milan	Sofia, Bulgaria
	Asparuhov 75'	Report	Sormani 11'	Stadium: Vasil Levski National Stadium; Attendance: 50,000; Referee: Faruk Talu (Turkey)

=== 1969–70 European Cup Winners' Cup ===
30 August 1969 1R 1st leg	ÍBV (Iceland)	0–4	(Bulgaria) Levski-Spartak	Reykjavík, Iceland
		Report	Veselinov 8'; Asparuhov 19'; Panov 32', 41'	Stadium: Laugardalsvöllur; Attendance: 6,000; Referee: Henry Øberg (Norway)

1 October 1969 1R 2nd leg	Levski-Spartak (Bulgaria)	4–0 (8–0 agg.)	(Iceland) ÍBV	Sofia, Bulgaria
	Kotkov 17', 48', 50'; Gaydarski 65'	Report		Stadium: Levski Stadium; Attendance: 12,000; Referee: Jacques Colling (Luxembourg)

12 November 1969 2R 1st leg	Levski-Spartak (Bulgaria)	4–0	(Switzerland) St. Gallen	Sofia, Bulgaria
	Kostov 11'; Panov 33'; Mitkov 60'; Kirilov 72'	Report		Stadium: Levski Stadium; Attendance: 20,000; Referee: Erich Linemayr (Austria)

26 November 1969 2R 2nd leg	St. Gallen (Switzerland)	0–0 (0–4 agg.)	(Bulgaria) Levski-Spartak	St. Gallen, Switzerland
		Report		Stadium: Espenmoos; Attendance: 2,500; Referee: Pavel Špoták (Czechoslovakia)

4 March 1970 QF 1st leg	Levski-Spartak (Bulgaria)	3–2	(Poland) Górnik Zabrze	Sofia, Bulgaria
	Asparuhov 30', 89'; Panov 36'	Report	Szołtysik 5'; Banaś 52'	Stadium: Levski Stadium; Attendance: 60,000; Referee: István Zsolt (Hungary)

18 March 1970 QF 2nd leg	Górnik Zabrze (Poland)	2–1 (4–4 (a) agg.)	(Bulgaria) Levski-Spartak	Chorzów, Poland
	Lubański 44'; Banaś 57'	Report	Kirilov 60'	Stadium: Stadion Śląski; Attendance: 90,000; Referee: Hans-Joachim Weiland (West Germany)

=== 1970–71 European Cup ===
18 August 1970 PR 1st leg	Levski-Spartak (Bulgaria)	3–1	Austria Wien	Sofia, Bulgaria
	Mitkov 17'; Asparuhov 52', 62'	Report	Riedl 73'	Stadium: Vasil Levski National Stadium; Attendance: 16,977; Referee: Antonio Sbardella (Italy)

2 September 1970 PR 2nd leg	Austria Wien	3–0 (4–3 agg.)	(Bulgaria) Levski-Spartak	Vienna, Austria
	Riedl 28'; Hickersberger 37', 49'	Report		Stadium: Praterstadion; Attendance: 15,233; Referee: János Bíróczky (Hungary)

=== 1971–72 European Cup Winners' Cup ===
16 September 1971 1R 1st leg	Levski-Spartak (Bulgaria)	1–1	(Netherlands) Sparta Rotterdam	Sofia, Bulgaria
	Panov 40'	Report	Bosveld 81'	Stadium: Levski Stadium; Attendance: 8,000; Referee: Timoleon Latsios (Greece)

29 September 1971 1R 2nd leg	Sparta Rotterdam (Netherlands)	2–0 (3–1 agg.)	(Bulgaria) Levski-Spartak	Rotterdam, Netherlands
	Kristensen 5'; Kowalik 49'	Report		Stadium: Stadion Spangen; Attendance: 22,000; Referee: William Mullan (Scotland)

=== 1972–73 UEFA Cup ===
13 September 1972 1R 1st leg	Universitatea Cluj (Romania)	4–1	(Bulgaria) Levski-Spartak	Cluj-Napoca, Romania
	Șoo 67'; Crețu 70'; Mureșan 78'; Uifăleanu 87'	Report	Haralampiev 54'	Stadium: Stadionul Ion Moina; Attendance: 6,105; Referee: Gerhard Künze (East Germany)

4 October 1972 1R 2nd leg	Levski-Spartak (Bulgaria)	5–1 (a.e.t.) (6–5 agg.)	(Romania) Universitatea Cluj	Sofia, Bulgaria
	Tsvetkov 38'; Zhechev 41'; Veselinov 63', 85'; Mitkov 109' (pen.)	Report	Munteanu 88'	Stadium: Vasil Levski National Stadium; Attendance: 4,000; Referee: Ivan Placek (Czechoslovakia)

25 October 1972 2R 1st leg	Dynamo Berlin (East Germany)	3–0	(Bulgaria) Levski-Spartak	East Berlin, Germany
	Terletzki 9'; Rohde 42'; Netz 65'	Report		Stadium: Dynamo-Stadion im Sportforum; Attendance: 10,000; Referee: Nicolae Rainea (Romania)

7 November 1972 2R 2nd leg	Levski-Spartak (Bulgaria)	2–0 (2–3 agg.)	(East Germany) Dynamo Berlin	Sofia, Bulgaria
	Zhechev 54', 62'	Report		Stadium: Levski Stadium; Attendance: 9,577; Referee: Michalakis Kiriakides (Cyprus)

=== 1974–75 European Cup ===
18 September 1974 1R 1st leg	Levski-Spartak (Bulgaria)	0–3	(Hungary) Újpesti Dózsa	Sofia, Bulgaria
		Report	Horváth 28'; Bene 58'; Dunai 76'	Stadium: Levski Stadium; Attendance: 29,722; Referee: Michal Jursa (Czechoslovakia)

2 October 1974 1R 2nd leg	Újpesti Dózsa (Hungary)	4–1 (7–1 agg.)	(Bulgaria) Levski-Spartak	Budapest, Hungary
	Bene 13', 70'; Dunai 58', 65'	Report	Voynov 19'	Stadium: Megyeri úti Stadion; Attendance: 8,763; Referee: Gheorghi Bakanidze (Soviet Union)

=== 1975–76 UEFA Cup ===
18 September 1975 1R 1st leg	Levski-Spartak (Bulgaria)	3–0	(Turkey) Eskişehirspor	Sofia, Bulgaria
	Spasov 15', 69'; Panov 58'	Report		Stadium: Vasil Levski National Stadium; Attendance: 13,215; Referee: Miloš Čajić (Yugoslavia)

1 October 1975 1R 2nd leg	Eskişehirspor (Turkey)	1–4 (1–7 agg.)	(Bulgaria) Levski-Spartak	Eskişehir, Turkey
	Kalaycı 44'	Report	Spasov 7', 12'; Panov 30'; Milanov 44'	Stadium: Eskişehir Atatürk Stadium; Attendance: 6,230; Referee: Riccardo Lattanzi (Italy)

21 October 1975 2R 1st leg	MSV Duisburg (West Germany)	3–2	(Bulgaria) Levski-Spartak	Duisburg, West Germany
	Schneider 17'; Worm 73'; Krause 90+1'	Report	Panov 11', 31'	Stadium: Wedaustadion; Attendance: 18,000; Referee: Francisco Lobo (Portugal)

4 November 1975 2R 2nd leg	Levski-Spartak (Bulgaria)	2–1 (4–4 (a) agg.)	(West Germany) MSV Duisburg	Sofia, Bulgaria
	Ivkov 49'; Panov 83' (pen.)	Report	Worm 59'	Stadium: Vasil Levski National Stadium; Attendance: 35,973; Referee: Tony Briguglio (Malta)

26 November 1975 3R 1st leg	Ajax (Netherlands)	2–1	(Bulgaria) Levski-Spartak	Amsterdam, Netherlands
	Geels 33'; Steffenhagen 76'	Report	Voynov 85'	Stadium: Olympic Stadium; Attendance: 23,769; Referee: Pedro María Urrestarazu Elordi (Spain)

10 December 1975 3R 2nd leg	Levski-Spartak (Bulgaria)	2–1 (a.e.t.) (3–3 agg.) (5–3 p)	(Netherlands) Ajax	Sofia, Bulgaria
	Panov 28', 71'	Report	Geels 55'	Stadium: Vasil Levski National Stadium; Attendance: 47,767; Referee: Paul Schiller (Austria)
	Penalties
	Tishanski (penalty scored); Panov (penalty scored); Milanov (penalty scored); Borisov (penalty scored); Yordanov (penalty scored)		(penalty scored) Geels; (penalty scored) Krol; (penalty missed) Helling; (penalty scored) Notten

3 March 1976 QF 1st leg	Barcelona (Spain)	4–0	(Bulgaria) Levski-Spartak	Barcelona, Spain
	Neeskens 38'; Marcial 44'; Asensi 80'; Heredia 89'	Report		Stadium: Camp Nou; Attendance: 60,000; Referee: Jean Dubach (Switzerland)

17 March 1976 QF 2nd leg	Levski-Spartak (Bulgaria)	5–4 (5–8 agg.)	(Spain) Barcelona	Sofia, Bulgaria
	Panov 8', 89' (pen.); Yordanov 10', 87'; Spasov 48'	Report	Marcial 33'; Asensi 45'; Heredia 57'; Neeskens 64' (pen.)	Stadium: Vasil Levski National Stadium; Attendance: 55,000; Referee: Ken Burns (England)

=== 1976–77 European Cup Winners' Cup ===
16 September 1976 1R 1st leg	Levski-Spartak (Bulgaria)	12–2	(Finland) Reipas Lahti	Sofia, Bulgaria
	Yordanov 12', 16'; Milanov 26', 44', 59', 64', 67', 87'; Panov 40', 73'; Spasov 57', 85'	Report	Sandberg 17'; Tupasela 58'	Stadium: Levski Stadium; Attendance: 55,000; Referee: Paul Bonett (Malta)

29 September 1976 1R 2nd leg	Reipas Lahti (Finland)	1–7 (3–19 agg.)	(Bulgaria) Levski-Spartak	Helsinki, Finland
	Sandberg 34'	Report	Panov 13'; Milanov 18' (pen.), 24', 27', 59' (pen.); Spasov 63'; Krastanov 75'	Stadium: Olympic Stadium; Attendance: 4,000; Referee: Torben Månsson (Denmark)

20 October 1976 2R 1st leg	Boavista (Portugal)	3–1	(Bulgaria) Levski-Spartak	Porto, Portugal
	Celso Pita 15', 83'; Mané 42'	Report	Milanov 26'	Stadium: Estádio do Bessa; Attendance: 25,000; Referee: Clive Thomas (Wales)

3 November 1976 2R 2nd leg	Levski-Spartak (Bulgaria)	2–0 (3–3 (a) agg.)	(Portugal) Boavista	Sofia, Bulgaria
	Panov 13'; Milanov 30'	Report		Stadium: Vasil Levski National Stadium; Attendance: 40,000; Referee: Orhan Cebe (Turkey)

2 March 1977 QF 1st leg	Levski-Spartak (Bulgaria)	2–1	(Spain) Atlético Madrid	Sofia, Bulgaria
	Tsvetkov 9'; Milanov 38'	Report	Ayala 68'	Stadium: Vasil Levski National Stadium; Attendance: 65,000; Referee: Sergio Gonella (Italy)

16 March 1977 QF 2nd leg	Atlético Madrid (Spain)	2–0 (3–2 agg.)	(Bulgaria) Levski-Spartak	Madrid, Spain
	Ayala 5' (pen.), 68' (pen.)	Report		Stadium: Vicente Calderón; Attendance: 70,000; Referee: John Carpenter (Republic of Ireland)

=== 1977–78 European Cup ===
14 September 1977 1R 1st leg	Levski-Spartak (Bulgaria)	3–0	(Poland) Śląsk Wrocław	Sofia, Bulgaria
	Panov 20'; Milanov 40', 43'	Report		Stadium: Levski Stadium; Attendance: 40,000; Referee: Valentin Lipatov (Soviet Union)

28 September 1977 1R 2nd leg	Śląsk Wrocław (Poland)	2–2 (2–5 agg.)	(Bulgaria) Levski-Spartak	Wrocław, Poland
	Pawłowski 22'; Kopycki 75'	Report	Panov 29', 58'	Stadium: Olympic Stadium; Attendance: 25,000; Referee: Károly Palotai (Hungary)

19 October 1977 2R 1st leg	Levski-Spartak (Bulgaria)	1–2	(Netherlands) Ajax	Sofia, Bulgaria
	Voynov 80' (pen.)	Report	Geels 30'; Erkens 79'	Stadium: Vasil Levski National Stadium; Attendance: 70,000; Referee: Heinz Aldinger (West Germany)

2 November 1977 2R 2nd leg	Ajax (Netherlands)	2–1 (4–2 agg.)	(Bulgaria) Levski-Spartak	Amsterdam, Netherlands
	Lerby 42'; Geels 53'	Report	Milanov 44'	Stadium: Olympic Stadium; Attendance: 15,500; Referee: Ulf Eriksson (Sweden)

=== 1978–79 UEFA Cup ===
14 September 1978 1R 1st leg	Olympiacos (Greece)	2–1	(Bulgaria) Levski-Spartak	Piraeus, Greece
	Kritikopoulos 51'; Kaltsas 76'	Report	Barzov 43'	Stadium: Karaiskakis Stadium; Attendance: 40,000; Referee: André Daina (Switzerland)

28 September 1978 1R 2nd leg	Levski-Spartak (Bulgaria)	3–1 (a.e.t.) (4–3 agg.)	(Greece) Olympiacos	Sofia, Bulgaria
	Milkov 47'; Panov 52'; Voynov 96' (pen.)	Report	Kaltsas 60'	Stadium: Vasil Levski National Stadium; Attendance: 30,000; Referee: Paolo Casarin (Italy)

19 October 1978 2R 1st leg	Levski-Spartak (Bulgaria)	1–1	(Italy) Milan	Sofia, Bulgaria
	Milkov 12'	Report	Chiodi 10'	Stadium: Vasil Levski National Stadium; Attendance: 60,000; Referee: Erich Linemayr (Austria)

1 November 1978 2R 2nd leg	Milan (Italy)	3–0 (4–1 agg.)	(Bulgaria) Levski-Spartak	Milan, Italy
	Maldera 12'; Bigon 39'; Chiodi 75'	Report		Stadium: San Siro; Attendance: 24,635; Referee: John Gordon (Scotland)

=== 1979–80 European Cup ===
19 September 1979 1R 1st leg	Levski-Spartak (Bulgaria)	0–1	(Spain) Real Madrid	Sofia, Bulgaria
		Report	Martínez 26'	Stadium: Levski Stadium; Attendance: 15,200; Referee: Horst Brummeier (Austria)

3 October 1979 1R 2nd leg	Real Madrid (Spain)	2–0 (3–0 agg.)	(Bulgaria) Levski-Spartak	Madrid, Spain
	del Bosque 20'; Cunningham 32' (pen.)	Report		Stadium: Santiago Bernabéu; Attendance: 40,000; Referee: Francis Rion (Belgium)

=== 1980–81 UEFA Cup ===
17 September 1980 1R 1st leg	Dynamo Kyiv (Soviet Union)	1–1	(Bulgaria) Levski-Spartak	Kyiv, Ukraine
19:00 EEST	Buryak 38' (pen.)	Report	Spasov 26'	Stadium: Republican Stadium; Attendance: 40,000; Referee: Dušan Krchňák (Czechoslovakia)

1 October 1980 1R 2nd leg	Levski-Spartak (Bulgaria)	0–0 (1–1 (a) agg.)	(Soviet Union) Dynamo Kyiv	Sofia, Bulgaria
18:30 EEST		Report		Stadium: Levski Stadium; Attendance: 35,000; Referee: László Pádár (Hungary)

21 October 1980 2R 1st leg	Levski-Spartak (Bulgaria)	1–1	(Netherlands) AZ '67	Sofia, Bulgaria
18:00 EEST	Spasov 54'	Report	Kist 47'	Stadium: Vasil Levski National Stadium; Attendance: 10,000; Referee: Walter Eschweiler (West Germany)

4 November 1980 2R 2nd leg	AZ '67 (Netherlands)	5–0 (6–1 agg.)	(Bulgaria) Levski-Spartak	Alkmaar, Netherlands
19:00 CET	Tol 30', 57'; Nygaard 51' (pen.); Kist 61'; Peters 89'	Report		Stadium: Alkmaarderhout; Attendance: 10,000; Referee: Rolf Nyhus (Norway)

=== 1981–82 UEFA Cup ===
16 September 1981 1R 1st leg	Dinamo București (Romania)	3–0	(Bulgaria) Levski-Spartak	Bucharest, Romania
17:00 EEST	Georgescu 12', 41'; Dragnea 37'	Report		Stadium: Stadionul Dinamo; Attendance: 13,000; Referee: Talal Tokat (Turkey)

29 September 1981 1R 2nd leg	Levski-Spartak (Bulgaria)	2–1 (2–4 agg.)	(Romania) Dinamo București	Sofia, Bulgaria
18:30 EEST	Kurdov 22', 33'	Report	Augustin 86'	Stadium: Vasil Levski National Stadium; Attendance: 35,000; Referee: Eldar Azimzade (Soviet Union)

=== 1982–83 UEFA Cup ===
15 September 1982 1R 1st leg	Sevilla (Spain)	3–1	(Bulgaria) Levski-Spartak	Seville, Spain
22:00 CEST	Santi 33' (pen.); Montero 63'; Magdaleno 74'	Report	Spasov 31'	Stadium: Ramón Sánchez Pizjuán; Attendance: 40,000; Referee: Enzo Barbaresco (Italy)

28 September 1982 1R 2nd leg	Levski-Spartak (Bulgaria)	0–3 (1–6 agg.)	(Spain) Sevilla	Sofia, Bulgaria
18:30 EEST		Report	Magdaleno 16'; Santi 25'; Juan Carlos 70'	Stadium: Vasil Levski National Stadium; Attendance: 60,000; Referee: Adolf Mathias (Austria)

=== 1983–84 UEFA Cup ===
14 September 1983 1R 1st leg	Stuttgart (West Germany)	1–1	(Bulgaria) Levski-Spartak	Stuttgart, West Germany
20:00 CEST	Kelsch 76'	Report	Valchev 78'	Stadium: Neckarstadion; Attendance: 17,500; Referee: Ron Bridges (Wales)

28 September 1983 1R 2nd leg	Levski-Spartak (Bulgaria)	1–0 (2–1 agg.)	(West Germany) Stuttgart	Sofia, Bulgaria
18:30 EEST	Valchev 89'	Report		Stadium: Vasil Levski National Stadium; Attendance: 65,000; Referee: Roger Schoeters (Belgium)

19 October 1983 2R 1st leg	Watford (England)	1–1	(Bulgaria) Levski-Spartak	Watford, England
19:45 BST	Rostron 43'	Report	Gochev 74'	Stadium: Vicarage Road; Attendance: 16,139; Referee: Georges Konrath (France)

2 November 1983 2R 2nd leg	Levski-Spartak (Bulgaria)	1–3 (a.e.t.) (2–4 agg.)	(England) Watford	Sofia, Bulgaria
18:30 EET	Spasov 6'	Report	Callaghan 9'; Rostron 116'; Richardson 117'	Stadium: Vasil Levski National Stadium; Attendance: 60,000; Referee: Erik Fredriksson (Sweden)

=== 1984–85 European Cup ===
19 September 1984 1R 1st leg	Levski-Spartak (Bulgaria)	1–1	(West Germany) Stuttgart	Sofia, Bulgaria
19:00 EEST	Kurdov 64'	Report	Reichert 62'	Stadium: Levski Stadium; Attendance: 23,000; Referee: Keith Hackett (England)

3 October 1984 1R 2nd leg	Stuttgart (West Germany)	2–2 (3–3 (a) agg.)	(Bulgaria) Levski-Spartak	Stuttgart, Germany
20:00 CEST	Allgöwer 14', 38'	Report	Iliev 29'; Tsvetkov 60'	Stadium: Neckarstadion; Attendance: 22,000; Referee: Horst Brummeier (Austria)

24 October 1984 2R 1st leg	Levski-Spartak (Bulgaria)	3–1	(Soviet Union) Dnipro	Sofia, Bulgaria
18:30 EEST	Velev 31'; Valchev 45'; N. Sirakov 67'	Report	Lytovchenko 24'	Stadium: Levski Stadium; Attendance: 35,000; Referee: Mircea Salomir (Romania)

7 November 1984 2R 2nd leg	Dnipro (Soviet Union)	2–0 (3–3 (a) agg.)	(Bulgaria) Levski-Spartak	Kryvyi Rih, Ukraine
17:00 EET	Taran 11'; Kuznetsov 24'	Report		Stadium: Stadion Metalurh; Attendance: 25,480; Referee: Siegfried Kirschen (East Germany)

=== 1986–87 European Cup Winners' Cup ===
16 September 1986 1R 1st leg	B 1903 (Denmark)	1–0	(Bulgaria) Vitosha Sofia	Copenhagen, Denmark
	Mathiesen 50'	Report		Stadium: Gentofte Stadion; Attendance: 4,593; Referee: Manfred Neuner (West Germany)

1 October 1986 1R 2nd leg	Vitosha Sofia (Bulgaria)	2–0 (2–1 agg.)	(Denmark) B 1903	Sofia, Bulgaria
	Iskrenov 75'; N. Sirakov 85'	Report		Stadium: Levski Stadium; Attendance: 27,500; Referee: Aldo Soldatić (Yugoslavia)

22 October 1986 2R 1st leg	Vitosha Sofia (Bulgaria)	2–0	(Socialist Federal Republic of Yugoslavia) Velež Mostar	Sofia, Bulgaria
	Yordanov 54'; N. Sirakov 68'	Report		Stadium: Levski Stadium; Attendance: 28,820; Referee: Aleksander Suchanek (Poland)

5 November 1986 2R 2nd leg	Velež Mostar (Socialist Federal Republic of Yugoslavia)	4–3 (4–5 agg.)	(Bulgaria) Vitosha Sofia	Mostar, Bosnia and Herzegovina
	Tuce 44', 84'; Gudelj 86'; Matijević 88'	Report	Iskrenov 42'; N. Sirakov 66', 71'	Stadium: Stadion pod Bijelim Brijegom; Attendance: 18,000; Referee: Yuriy Savchenko (Soviet Union)

4 March 1987 QF 1st leg	Zaragoza (Spain)	2–0	(Bulgaria) Vitosha Sofia	Zaragoza, Spain
	Roberto 55'; García Cortés 77'	Report		Stadium: La Romareda; Attendance: 11,666; Referee: Marcel Van Langenhove (Belgium)

18 March 1987 QF 2nd leg	Vitosha Sofia (Bulgaria)	0–2 (0–4 agg.)	(Spain) Zaragoza	Sofia, Bulgaria
		Report	Mejías 33'; Roberto 82'	Stadium: Vasil Levski National Stadium; Attendance: 50,000; Referee: Horst Brummeier (Austria)

=== 1987–88 European Cup Winners' Cup ===
16 September 1987 1R 1st leg	Vitosha Sofia (Bulgaria)	1–0	(Greece) OFI	Sofia, Bulgaria
	N. Sirakov 87' (pen.)	Report		Stadium: Levski Stadium; Attendance: 7,500; Referee: Helmut Kohl (Austria)

30 September 1987 1R 2nd leg	OFI (Greece)	3–1 (3–2 agg.)	(Bulgaria) Vitosha Sofia	Heraklion, Greece
	Tsimbos 26'; Marinakis 48'; Charalambidis 68'	Report	Kurdov 71'	Stadium: Theodoros Vardinogiannis; Attendance: 12,036; Referee: Bruno Galler (Switzerland)

=== 1988–89 European Cup ===
7 September 1988 1R 1st leg	Vitosha Sofia (Bulgaria)	0–2	(Italy) Milan	Sofia, Bulgaria
20:30 EEST		Report	Virdis 18'; Gullit 75'	Stadium: Levski Stadium; Attendance: 30,000; Referee: Gerasimos Germanakos (Greece)

6 October 1988 1R 2nd leg	Milan (Italy)	5–2 (7–2 agg.)	(Bulgaria) Vitosha Sofia	Milan, Italy
19:30 CEST	van Basten 2', 13', 43', 84'; Virdis 64'	Report	Nachev 29'; Iliev 74'	Stadium: San Siro; Attendance: 53,086; Referee: Joe Worrall (England)

=== 1989–90 UEFA Cup ===
12 September 1989 1R 1st leg	Vitosha Sofia (Bulgaria)	0–0	(Belgium) Antwerp	Sofia, Bulgaria
18:00 EEST		Report		Stadium: Levski Stadium; Attendance: 15,000; Referee: Michel Girard (France)

26 September 1989 1R 2nd leg	Antwerp (Belgium)	4–3 (4–3 agg.)	(Bulgaria) Vitosha Sofia	Antwerp, Belgium
20:00 CEST	Geilenkirchen 85'; Claesen 90', 90+2'; Quaranta 90+5'	Report	Slavchev 6'; Donkov 87'; Mihtarski 89'	Stadium: Bosuilstadion; Attendance: 7,000; Referee: Friedrich Kaupe (Austria)

=== 1991–92 European Cup Winners' Cup ===
18 September 1991 1R 1st leg	Levski Sofia (Bulgaria)	2–3	(Hungary) Ferencváros	Sofia, Bulgaria
	Dartilov 36'; Bankov 90'	Report	Deszatnik 7'; Lipcsei 72', 81'	Stadium: Georgi Asparuhov; Attendance: 15,000; Referee: Gheorghe Constantin (Romania)

2 October 1991 1R 2nd leg	Ferencváros (Hungary)	4–1 (7–3 agg.)	(Bulgaria) Levski Sofia	Budapest, Hungary
	Lipcsei 1', 90'; Albert 28'; Deszatnik 57'	Report	Dimitrov 73'	Stadium: Üllői úti Stadion; Attendance: 8,000; Referee: Yusuf Namoğlu (Turkey)

=== 1992–93 European Cup Winners' Cup ===
16 September 1992 1R 1st leg	Levski Sofia (Bulgaria)	2–1	(Switzerland) Luzern	Sofia, Bulgaria
	Borimirov 52'; Getov 70' (pen.)	Report	Camenzind 9'	Stadium: Vasil Levski National Stadium; Attendance: 15,000; Referee: Václav Krondl (Czechoslovakia)

30 September 1992 1R 2nd leg	Luzern (Switzerland)	1–0 (2–2 (a) agg.)	(Bulgaria) Levski Sofia	Lucerne, Switzerland
	Camenzind 24'	Report		Stadium: Stadion Allmend; Attendance: 10,000; Referee: Joaquín Urío Velázquez (Spain)

=== 1993–94 UEFA Champions League ===
15 September 1993 1R 1st leg	Rangers (Scotland)	3–2	(Bulgaria) Levski Sofia	Glasgow, Scotland
20:00 BST	McPherson 45'; Hateley 57', 78'	Report	Borimirov 76'; Todorov 81'	Stadium: Ibrox Stadium; Attendance: 37,013; Referee: Kim Milton Nielsen (Denmark)

29 September 1993 1R 2nd leg	Levski Sofia (Bulgaria)	2–1 (4–4 (a) agg.)	(Scotland) Rangers	Sofia, Bulgaria
19:00 EEST	N. Sirakov 36'; Todorov 90'	Report	Durrant 43'	Stadium: Vasil Levski National Stadium; Attendance: 40,000; Referee: Manuel Díaz Vega (Spain)

20 October 1993 2R 1st leg	Levski Sofia (Bulgaria)	2–2	(Germany) Werder Bremen	Sofia, Bulgaria
20:00 EEST	Yankov 75'; Ginchev 90'	Report	Bode 50'; Rufer 52'	Stadium: Vasil Levski National Stadium; Attendance: 40,000; Referee: Mario van der Ende (Netherlands)

3 November 1993 2R 2nd leg	Werder Bremen (Germany)	1–0 (3–2 agg.)	(Bulgaria) Levski Sofia	Bremen, Germany
19:15 CET	Basler 73'	Report		Stadium: Weserstadion; Attendance: 26,953; Referee: Pierluigi Pairetto (Italy)

=== 1994–95 UEFA Cup ===
9 August 1994 PR 1st leg	Olimpija Ljubljana (Slovenia)	3–2	(Bulgaria) Levski Sofia	Ljubljana, Slovenia
20:15 CEST	Dosti 35', 37', 73'	Report	N. Sirakov 57', 72'	Stadium: Bežigrad Stadium; Attendance: 4,000; Referee: Perikles Vasilakis (Greece)

23 August 1994 PR 2nd leg	Levski Sofia (Bulgaria)	1–2 (3–5 agg.)	(Slovenia) Olimpija Ljubljana	Sofia, Bulgaria
20:00 EEST	Stoilov 2'	Report	Novak 24'; Pavlin 89'	Stadium: Vasil Levski National Stadium; Attendance: 15,000; Referee: Piero Ceccarini (Italy)

=== 1995–96 UEFA Cup ===
8 August 1995 PR 1st leg	Dinamo București (Romania)	0–1	(Bulgaria) Levski Sofia	Bucharest, Romania
18:00 EEST		Report	G. Ivanov 29'	Stadium: Stadionul Dinamo; Attendance: 6,000; Referee: Roelof Luinge (Netherlands)

22 August 1995 PR 2nd leg	Levski Sofia (Bulgaria)	1–1 (a.e.t.) (2–1 agg.)	(Romania) Dinamo București	Sofia, Bulgaria
20:00 EEST	Vasilev 110'	Report	Lupu 70'	Stadium: Georgi Asparuhov; Attendance: 17,000; Referee: Loris Stafoggia (Italy)

12 September 1995 1R 1st leg	Levski Sofia (Bulgaria)	1–2	(Belgium) Eendracht Aalst	Sofia, Bulgaria
19:30 EEST	Vasilev 68'	Report	Markov 58' (o.g.); Paas 77'	Stadium: Vasil Levski National Stadium; Attendance: 20,000; Referee: Nikolai Levnikov (Russia)

26 September 1995 1R 2nd leg	Eendracht Aalst (Belgium)	1–0 (3–1 agg.)	(Bulgaria) Levski Sofia	Aalst, Belgium
20:15 CEST	Lamberg 59'	Report		Stadium: Pierre Cornelisstadion; Attendance: 10,000; Referee: Pierluigi Pairetto (Italy)

=== 1996–97 UEFA Cup Winners' Cup ===
8 August 1996 QR 1st leg	Olimpija Ljubljana (Slovenia)	1–0	(Bulgaria) Levski Sofia	Ljubljana, Slovenia
20:15 CEST	Bozgo 50'	Report		Stadium: Bežigrad Stadium; Attendance: 691; Referee: Marek Kowalczyk (Poland)

22 August 1996 QR 2nd leg	Levski Sofia (Bulgaria)	1–0 (a.e.t.) (1–1 agg.) (2–4 p)	(Slovenia) Olimpija Ljubljana	Sofia, Bulgaria
20:00 EEST	Simeonov 58'	Report		Stadium: Vasil Levski National Stadium; Attendance: 12,000; Referee: Bohdan Benedik (Slovakia)
	Penalties
	Zaytsev (penalty missed); Yonkov (penalty scored); Todorov (penalty missed); Simeonov (penalty scored)		(penalty scored) Bozgo; (penalty scored) Ačimovič; (penalty scored) Velkovski; (penalty missed) Djuranović; (penalty scored) Gajser

=== 1997–98 UEFA Cup Winners' Cup ===
14 August 1997 QR 1st leg	Levski Sofia (Bulgaria)	1–1	(Slovakia) Slovan Bratislava	Sofia, Bulgaria
19:00 EEST	G. Ivanov 18'	Report	Novák 64'	Stadium: Vasil Levski National Stadium; Attendance: 14,373; Referee: Juan Ansuátegui Roca (Spain)

28 August 1997 QR 2nd leg	Slovan Bratislava (Slovakia)	2–1 (3–2 agg.)	(Bulgaria) Levski Sofia	Bratislava, Slovakia
18:00 CEST	Novák 15'; Mužlay 51'	Report	Todorov 2'	Stadium: Tehelné pole Attendance: 6,800; Referee: Claude Détruche (Switzerland)

=== 1998–99 UEFA Cup Winners' Cup ===
13 August 1998 QR 1st leg	Levski Sofia (Bulgaria)	8–1	(Belarus) Lokomotiv-96 Vitebsk	Sofia, Bulgaria
	G. Ivanov 8', 32'; Borisov 23', 44', 88'; Donev 42'; Radukanov 52'; Rahozhkin 85' (o.g.)	Report	Demenkovets 49' (pen.)	Stadium: Vasil Levski National Stadium; Attendance: 15,000; Referee: Kyros Vassaras (Greece)

27 August 1998 QR 2nd leg	Lokomotiv-96 Vitebsk (Belarus)	1–1 (2–9 agg.)	(Bulgaria) Levski Sofia	Minsk, Belarus
	Sivkov 90'	Report	Lazarov 56'	Stadium: Dinamo Stadium; Attendance: 750; Referee: Vladimír Hriňák (Slovakia)

17 September 1998 1R 1st leg	Levski Sofia (Bulgaria)	0–2	(Denmark) Copenhagen	Sofia, Bulgaria
		Report	Goldbæk 34' (pen.); K. Jensen 75'	Stadium: Vasil Levski National Stadium; Attendance: 2,860; Referee: Dik van Egmond (Netherlands)

1 October 1998 1R 2nd leg	Copenhagen (Denmark)	4–1 (6–1 agg.)	(Bulgaria) Levski Sofia	Copenhagen, Denmark
	M. Nielsen 18'; Højer 49'; Thorninger 59', 76'	Report	Lazarov 85'	Stadium: Parken Stadium; Attendance: 6,354; Referee: Mike McCurry (Scotland)

=== 1999–2000 UEFA Cup ===
12 August 1999 QR 1st leg	APOEL (Cyprus)	0–0	(Bulgaria) Levski Sofia	Nicosia, Cyprus
20:00 EEST		Report		Stadium: Makario Stadium; Attendance: 5,000; Referee: Michal Beneš (Czech Republic)

26 August 1999 QR 2nd leg	Levski Sofia (Bulgaria)	2–0 (2–0 agg.)	(Cyprus) APOEL	Sofia, Bulgaria
17:30 EEST	Z. Sirakov 67'; Pažin 75'	Report		Stadium: Georgi Asparuhov; Attendance: 16,000; Referee: Alan Freeland (Scotland)

16 September 1999 1R 1st leg	Hajduk Split (Croatia)	0–0	(Bulgaria) Levski Sofia	Split, Croatia
17:45 CEST		Report		Stadium: Stadion Poljud; Attendance: 11,627; Referee: Pasquale Rodomonti (Italy)

30 September 1999 1R 2nd leg	Levski Sofia (Bulgaria)	3–0 (3–0 agg.)	(Croatia) Hajduk Split	Sofia, Bulgaria
15:45 EEST	Ivankov 16' (pen.); Bachev 33'; Dimitrov 85'	Report		Stadium: Georgi Asparuhov; Attendance: 24,000; Referee: Mike Riley (England)

21 October 1999 2R 1st leg	Levski Sofia (Bulgaria)	1–3	(Italy) Juventus	Sofia, Bulgaria
19:00 EEST	Yoffou 55'	Report	Oliseh 23'; Kovačević 52', 89'	Stadium: Georgi Asparuhov; Attendance: 25,000; Referee: Jorge Monteiro Coroado (Portugal)

4 November 1999 2R 2nd leg	Juventus (Italy)	1–1 (4–2 agg.)	(Bulgaria) Levski Sofia	Turin, Italy
20:45 CET	Kovačević 79'	Report	Atanasov 15'	Stadium: Delle Alpi; Attendance: 2,681; Referee: Frank De Bleeckere (Belgium)

=== 2000–01 UEFA Champions League ===
12 July 2000 1QR 1st leg	F91 Dudelange (Luxembourg)	0–4	(Bulgaria) Levski Sofia	Dudelange, Luxembourg
20:00 CEST		Report	G. Ivanov 11', 87'; Ivankov 16' (pen.); Tsykhmeystruk 68'	Stadium: Stade Jos Nosbaum; Attendance: 1,121; Referee: Herbert Fandel (Germany)

19 July 2000 1QR 2nd leg	Levski Sofia (Bulgaria)	2–0 (6–0 agg.)	(Luxembourg) F91 Dudelange	Sofia, Bulgaria
20:30 EEST	G. Ivanov 35', 52' (pen.)	Report		Stadium: Georgi Asparuhov; Attendance: 5,284; Referee: Paul Allaerts (Belgium)

26 July 2000 2QR 1st leg	Beşiktaş (Turkey)	1–0	(Bulgaria) Levski Sofia	Istanbul, Turkey
20:45 TRT	Nouma 81'	Report		Stadium: BJK İnönü Stadium; Attendance: 20,800; Referee: Fiorenzo Treossi (Italy)

2 August 2000 2QR 2nd leg	Levski Sofia (Bulgaria)	1–1 (1–2 agg.)	(Turkey) Beşiktaş	Sofia, Bulgaria
20:30 EEST	Markov 64'	Report	Tayfur 35'	Stadium: Georgi Asparuhov; Attendance: 20,865; Referee: Martin Hansson (Sweden)

=== 2001–02 UEFA Champions League ===
11 July 2001 1QR 1st leg	Levski Sofia (Bulgaria)	4–0	(Bosnia and Herzegovina) Željezničar	Sofia, Bulgaria
20:00 EEST	Terziev 7'; G. Ivanov 20', 73' (pen.); Markov 28'	Report		Stadium: Georgi Asparuhov; Attendance: 16,121; Referee: Dougie McDonald (Scotland)

18 July 2001 1QR 2nd leg	Željezničar (Bosnia and Herzegovina)	0–0 (0–4 agg.)	(Bulgaria) Levski Sofia	Sarajevo, Bosnia and Herzegovina
20:15 CEST		Report		Stadium: Asim Ferhatović Hase; Attendance: 3,000; Referee: Bruno Derrien (France)

25 July 2001 2QR 1st leg	Levski Sofia (Bulgaria)	0–0	(Norway) Brann	Sofia, Bulgaria
20:00 EEST		Report		Stadium: Georgi Asparuhov; Attendance: 13,780; Referee: Stefano Farina (Italy)

1 August 2001 2QR 2nd leg	Brann (Norway)	1–1 (1–1 (a) agg.)	(Bulgaria) Levski Sofia	Bergen, Norway
20:45 CEST	Walltin 16'	Report	G. Ivanov 5'	Stadium: Brann Stadion; Attendance: 10,902; Referee: Jacek Granat (Poland)

8 August 2001 3QR 1st leg	Galatasaray (Turkey)	2–1	(Bulgaria) Levski Sofia	Istanbul, Turkey
19:30 TRT	Ümit Karan 9'; Davala 74'	Report	G. Ivanov 78'	Stadium: Ali Sami Yen Stadium; Attendance: 16,051; Referee: Herbert Fandel (Germany)

22 August 2001 3QR 2nd leg	Levski Sofia (Bulgaria)	1–1 (2–3 agg.)	(Turkey) Galatasaray	Sofia, Bulgaria
19:00 EEST	Pantelić 78'	Report	Serkan 50'	Stadium: Georgi Asparuhov; Attendance: 25,500; Referee: Claude Colombo (France)

=== 2001–02 UEFA Cup ===
20 September 2001 1R 1st leg	Chelsea (England)	3–0	(Bulgaria) Levski Sofia	London, England
21:00 BST	Guðjohnsen 45', 74'; Lampard 90'	Report		Stadium: Stamford Bridge; Attendance: 20,812; Referee: Helmut Fleischer (Germany)

27 September 2001 1R 2nd leg	Levski Sofia (Bulgaria)	0–2 (0–5 agg.)	(England) Chelsea	Sofia, Bulgaria
20:30 EEST		Report	Terry 33'; Guðjohnsen 45'	Stadium: Georgi Asparuhov; Attendance: 10,000; Referee: Martin Ingvarsson (Sweden)

=== 2002–03 UEFA Champions League ===
31 July 2002 2QR 1st leg	Skonto (Latvia)	0–0	(Bulgaria) Levski Sofia	Riga, Latvia
18:30 EEST		Report		Stadium: Skonto Stadium; Attendance: 4,354; Referee: Philippe Leuba (Switzerland)

7 August 2002 2QR 2nd leg	Levski Sofia (Bulgaria)	2–0 (2–0 agg.)	(Latvia) Skonto	Sofia, Bulgaria
20:30 EEST	Chilikov 12'; Simonović 31'	Report		Stadium: Georgi Asparuhov; Attendance: 12,000; Referee: Mikko Vuorela (Finland)

14 August 2002 3QR 1st leg	Levski Sofia (Bulgaria)	0–1	(Ukraine) Dynamo Kyiv	Sofia, Bulgaria
20:30 EEST		Report	Cernat 60'	Stadium: Georgi Asparuhov; Attendance: 15,000; Referee: Massimo De Santis (Italy)

28 August 2002 3QR 2nd leg	Dynamo Kyiv (Ukraine)	1–0 (2–0 agg.)	(Bulgaria) Levski Sofia	Kyiv, Ukraine
19:00 EEST	Cernat 42'	Report		Stadium: Valeriy Lobanovskyi Dynamo Stadium; Attendance: 16,863; Referee: Graham Poll (England)

=== 2002–03 UEFA Cup ===
19 September 2002 1R 1st leg	Levski Sofia (Bulgaria)	4–1	(Denmark) Brøndby	Sofia, Bulgaria
19:15 EEST	Simonović 6', 35'; Telkiyski 51', 57'	Report	Madsen 19'	Stadium: Georgi Asparuhov; Attendance: 10,000; Referee: Anton Stredak (Slovakia)

3 October 2002 1R 1st leg	Brøndby (Denmark)	1–1 (2–5 agg.)	(Bulgaria) Levski Sofia	Brøndbyvester, Denmark
20:15 CEST	Jonson 73'	Report	Ivankov 9' (pen.)	Stadium: Brøndby Stadium; Attendance: 9,456; Referee: Oleg Chikun (Belarus)

31 October 2002 2R 1st leg	Sturm Graz (Austria)	1–0	(Bulgaria) Levski Sofia	Graz, Austria
18:00 CET	Szabics 21'	Report		Stadium: Arnold Schwarzenegger-Stadion; Attendance: 5,422; Referee: Karel Vidlak (Czech Republic)

14 November 2002 2R 2nd leg	Levski Sofia (Bulgaria)	1–0 (a.e.t.) (1–1 agg.) (7–8 p)	(Austria) Sturm Graz	Sofia, Bulgaria
19:00 EET	Simonović 6'	Report		Stadium: Vasil Levski National Stadium; Attendance: 22,582; Referee: Darko Čeferin (Slovenia)
	Penalties
	Markov (penalty scored); Telkiyski (penalty scored); Kolev (penalty scored); Topuzakov (penalty scored); Stoilov (penalty missed); Angelov (penalty scored); Pantelić (penalty scored); Lawal (penalty scored); Bachkov (penalty missed)		(penalty scored) Szabics; (penalty scored) Brzęczek; (penalty scored) Wetl; (penalty scored) Angan; (penalty missed) Golemac; (penalty scored) Korsós; (penalty scored) Strafner; (penalty scored) Neukirchner; (penalty scored) Amoah

=== 2003–04 UEFA Cup ===
14 August 2003 QR 1st leg	Atyrau (Kazakhstan)	1–4	(Bulgaria) Levski Sofia	Atyrau, Kazakhstan
17:30 KZT	Agabayev 88'	Report	Chilikov 9'; G. Ivanov 13', 33'; Temile 20'	Stadium: Munaishy Stadium; Attendance: 9,000; Referee: Ali Aydın (Turkey)

28 August 2003 QR 2nd leg	Levski Sofia (Bulgaria)	2–0 (6–1 agg.)	(Kazakhstan) Atyrau	Sofia, Bulgaria
19:30 EEST	G. Ivanov 27'; Telkiyski 69'	Report		Stadium: Georgi Asparuhov; Attendance: 8,000; Referee: Olegário Benquerença (Portugal)

24 September 2003 1R 1st leg	Hapoel Ramat Gan (Israel)	0–1	(Bulgaria) Levski Sofia	Dunajská Streda, Slovakia
15:30 CEST		Report	B. Dimitrov 80'	Stadium: Mestský štadión Attendance: 1,468; Referee: Lawrence Sammut (Malta)

15 October 2003 1R 2nd leg	Levski Sofia (Bulgaria)	4–0 (5–0 agg.)	(Israel) Hapoel Ramat Gan	Sofia, Bulgaria
18:30 EEST	Chilikov 23'; G. Ivanov 75'; Simonović 79'; Demba-Nyren 90'	Report		Stadium: Georgi Asparuhov; Attendance: 6,000; Referee: Georgios Douros (Greece)

6 November 2003 2R 1st leg	Slavia Prague (Czech Republic)	2–2	(Bulgaria) Levski Sofia	Prague, Czech Republic
17:00 CET	Kuka 22'; Fořt 90+2'	Report	G. Ivanov 78'; Müller 90+1' (o.g.)	Stadium: Evžena Rošického; Attendance: 5,000; Referee: Mike McCurry (Scotland)

27 November 2003 2R 2nd leg	Levski Sofia (Bulgaria)	0–0 (2–2 (a) agg.)	(Czech Republic) Slavia Prague	Sofia, Bulgaria
17:00 EET		Report		Stadium: Georgi Asparuhov; Attendance: 25,000; Referee: Nicolai Vollquartz (Denmark)

26 February 2004 3R 1st leg	Liverpool (England)	2–0	(Bulgaria) Levski Sofia	Liverpool, England
21:00 GMT	Gerrard 67'; Kewell 70'	Report		Stadium: Anfield; Attendance: 39,149; Referee: René Temmink (Netherlands)

3 March 2004 3R 2nd leg	Levski Sofia (Bulgaria)	2–4 (2–6 agg.)	(England) Liverpool	Sofia, Bulgaria
21:10 EET	G. Ivanov 27'; Simonović 40'	Report	Gerrard 7'; Owen 11'; Hamann 43'; Hyypiä 68'	Stadium: Vasil Levski National Stadium; Attendance: 42,281; Referee: Peter Fröjdfeldt (Sweden)

=== 2004–05 UEFA Cup ===
12 August 2004 2QR 1st leg	Levski Sofia (Bulgaria)	5–0	(Bosnia and Herzegovina) Modriča	Sofia, Bulgaria
20:00 EEST	Vasić 5' (o.g.); Chilikov 13', 77', 79'; E. Angelov 89'	Report		Stadium: Georgi Asparuhov; Attendance: 9,000; Referee: Jacek Granat (Poland)

26 August 2004 2QR 2nd leg	Modriča (Bosnia and Herzegovina)	0–3 (0–8 agg.)	(Bulgaria) Levski Sofia	Ugljevik, Bosnia and Herzegovina
16:30 CEST		Report	Telkiyski 49'; Lúcio Wagner 83', 90'	Stadium: Novi Gradski stadion Attendance: 300; Referee: António Costa (Portugal)

16 September 2004 1R 1st leg	Levski Sofia (Bulgaria)	1–1	(Belgium) Beveren	Sofia, Bulgaria
19:30 EEST	Telkiyski 62'	Report	Sanogo 64'	Stadium: Georgi Asparuhov; Attendance: 17,000; Referee: Jouni Hyytiä (Finland)

30 September 2004 1R 2nd leg	Beveren (Belgium)	1–0 (2–1 agg.)	(Bulgaria) Levski Sofia	Beveren, Belgium
20:30 CEST	Né 45'	Report		Stadium: Freethiel Stadion; Attendance: 6,000; Referee: Serhiy Shebek (Ukraine)

=== 2005–06 UEFA Cup ===
11 August 2005 2QR 1st leg	Publikum (Slovenia)	1–0	(Bulgaria) Levski Sofia	Celje, Slovenia
20:30 CEST	Beršnjak 68'	Report		Stadium: Arena Petrol; Attendance: 2,000; Referee: Khagani Mamedov (Azerbaijan)

25 August 2005 2QR 2nd leg	Levski Sofia (Bulgaria)	3–0 (3–1 agg.)	(Slovenia) Publikum	Sofia, Bulgaria
20:15 EEST	Yovov 41', 64'; Domovchiyski 69'	Report		Stadium: Georgi Asparuhov; Attendance: 12,000; Referee: Costas Theodotou (Cyprus)

15 September 2005 1R 1st leg	Auxerre (France)	2–1	(Bulgaria) Levski Sofia	Auxerre, France
20:30 CEST	Poyet 55'; Pieroni 67'	Report	Bardon 34'	Stadium: Stade de l'Abbé-Deschamps; Attendance: 5,000; Referee: Helmut Fleischer (Germany)

29 September 2005 1R 2nd leg	Levski Sofia (Bulgaria)	1–0 (2–2 (a) agg.)	(France) Auxerre	Sofia, Bulgaria
19:30 EEST	Koprivarov 28'	Report		Stadium: Georgi Asparuhov; Attendance: 20,000; Referee: Martin Ingvarsson (Sweden)

Group F

Pos	Team	Pld	W	D	L	GF	GA	GD	Pts	Qualification	OM	LS	HVN	CSM	DB
1	(France) Marseille	4	3	0	1	5	3	+2	9	Advance to knockout stage	—	—	1–0	—	2–1
2	(Bulgaria) Levski Sofia	4	2	0	2	4	4	0	6	Advance to knockout stage	1–0	—	—	—	1–0
3	(Netherlands) Heerenveen	4	1	2	1	2	2	0	5	Advance to knockout stage	—	2–1	—	0–0	—
4	(Russia) CSKA Moscow	4	1	1	2	3	4	−1	4		1–2	2–1	—	—	—
5	(Romania) Dinamo București	4	1	1	2	2	3	−1	4		—	—	0–0	1–0	—

3 November 2005 1	Levski Sofia (Bulgaria)	1–0	(Romania) Dinamo București	Sofia, Bulgaria
19:00 EET	E. Angelov 90+3'	Report		Stadium: Georgi Asparuhov; Attendance: 20,000; Referee: Nikolai Ivanov (Russia)

24 November 2005 2	CSKA Moscow (Russia)	2–1	(Bulgaria) Levski Sofia	Moscow, Russia
18:30 MSK	Vágner Love 49', 73'	Report	Domovchiyski 90'	Stadium: Central Dynamo Stadium; Attendance: 6,000; Referee: Kenny Clark (Scotland)

1 December 2005 3	Levski Sofia (Bulgaria)	1–0	(France) Marseille	Sofia, Bulgaria
19:30 EET	Yovov 54'	Report		Stadium: Georgi Asparuhov; Attendance: 12,000; Referee: Nicolai Vollquartz (Denmark)

14 December 2005 4	Heerenveen (Netherlands)	2–1	(Bulgaria) Levski Sofia	Heerenveen, Netherlands
20:45 CET	Samaras 55'; Hanssen 90'	Report	M. Ivanov 53'	Stadium: Abe Lenstra Stadion; Attendance: 20,025; Referee: Zsolt Szabo (Hungary)

Knockout stage

15 February 2006 R32 1st leg	Artmedia Bratislava (Slovakia)	0–1	(Bulgaria) Levski Sofia	Trnava, Slovakia
17:30 CET		Report	E. Angelov 9'	Stadium: Antona Malatinského; Attendance: 5,720; Referee: Laurent Duhamel (France)

23 February 2006 R32 2nd leg	Levski Sofia (Bulgaria)	2–0 (3–0 agg.)	(Slovakia) Artmedia Bratislava	Sofia, Bulgaria
18:00 EET	E. Angelov 14', 27'	Report		Stadium: Vasil Levski National Stadium; Attendance: 23,441; Referee: Gerald Lehner (Austria)

9 March 2006 R16 1st leg	Udinese (Italy)	0–0	(Bulgaria) Levski Sofia	Udine, Italy
20:45 CET		Report		Stadium: Friuli; Attendance: 9,000; Referee: Frank De Bleeckere (Belgium)

16 March 2006 R16 2nd leg	Levski Sofia (Bulgaria)	2–1 (2–1 agg.)	(Italy) Udinese	Sofia, Bulgaria
18:30 EET	Borimirov 51'; Tomašić 63'	Report	Tissone 22'	Stadium: Vasil Levski National Stadium; Attendance: 25,000; Referee: Steve Bennett (England)

30 March 2006 QF 1st leg	Levski Sofia (Bulgaria)	1–3	(Germany) Schalke 04	Sofia, Bulgaria
20:00 EEST	Borimirov 6'	Report	Varela 48'; Lincoln 69'; Asamoah 79'	Stadium: Vasil Levski National Stadium; Attendance: 38,000; Referee: Mike Riley (England)

6 April 2006 QF 2nd leg	Schalke 04 (Germany)	1–1 (4–2 agg.)	(Bulgaria) Levski Sofia	Gelsenkirchen, Germany
20:30 CEST	Lincoln 58'	Report	E. Angelov 24'	Stadium: Veltins-Arena; Attendance: 52,973; Referee: Massimo Busacca (Switzerland)

=== 2006–07 UEFA Champions League ===
26 July 2006 2QR 1st leg	Levski Sofia (Bulgaria)	2–0	(Georgia (country)) Sioni Bolnisi	Sofia, Bulgaria
20:30 EEST	E. Angelov 20'; Borimirov 82' (pen.)	Report		Stadium: Georgi Asparuhov Stadium; Attendance: 11,075; Referee: Fritz Stuchlik (Austria)

2 August 2006 2QR 2nd leg	Sioni Bolnisi (Georgia (country))	0–2 (0–4 agg.)	(Bulgaria) Levski Sofia	Tbilisi, Georgia
18:00 GET		Report	Domovchiyski 28'; E. Angelov 90+1'	Stadium: Mikheil Meskhi Stadium; Attendance: 6,900; Referee: Selçuk Dereli (Turkey)

9 August 2006 3QR 1st leg	Levski Sofia (Bulgaria)	2–0	(Italy) Chievo	Sofia, Bulgaria
20:30 EEST	Domovchiyski 8'; Bardon 86' (pen.)	Report		Stadium: Vasil Levski National Stadium; Attendance: 18,949; Referee: Jaroslav Jara (Czech Republic)

23 August 2006 3QR 2nd leg	Chievo (Italy)	2–2 (2–4 agg.)	(Bulgaria) Levski Sofia	Verona, Italy
21:00 CEST	Amauri 48', 81'	Report	Telkiyski 34'; Bardon 46'	Stadium: Marcantonio Bentegodi; Attendance: 23,517; Referee: Lucílio Batista (Portugal)

Group A

Pos	Team	Pld	W	D	L	GF	GA	GD	Pts	Qualification	CHE	BAR	BRM	LSO
1	(England) Chelsea	6	4	1	1	10	4	+6	13	Advance to knockout stage	—	1–0	2–0	2–0
2	(Spain) Barcelona	6	3	2	1	12	4	+8	11	Advance to knockout stage	2–2	—	2–0	5–0
3	(Germany) Werder Bremen	6	3	1	2	7	5	+2	10	Transfer to UEFA Cup	1–0	1–1	—	2–0
4	(Bulgaria) Levski Sofia	6	0	0	6	1	17	−16	0		1–3	0–2	0–3	—

Source: RSSSF

12 September 2006 1	Barcelona (Spain)	5–0	(Bulgaria) Levski Sofia	Barcelona, Spain
20:45 CEST	Iniesta 7'; Giuly 39'; Puyol 49'; Eto'o 58'; Ronaldinho 90+3'	Report		Stadium: Camp Nou; Attendance: 91,000; Referee: Konrad Plautz (Austria)

27 September 2006 2	Levski Sofia (Bulgaria)	1–3	(England) Chelsea	Sofia, Bulgaria
21:45 EEST	Ognyanov 89'	Report	Drogba 39', 52', 68'	Stadium: Vasil Levski National Stadium; Attendance: 27,950; Referee: Laurent Duhamel (France)

18 October 2006 3	Werder Bremen (Germany)	2–0	(Bulgaria) Levski Sofia	Bremen, Germany
20:45 CEST	Naldo 45+1'; Diego 73'	Report		Stadium: Weserstadion; Attendance: 41,000; Referee: Paul Allaerts (Belgium)

31 October 2006 4	Levski Sofia (Bulgaria)	0–3	(Germany) Werder Bremen	Sofia, Bulgaria
21:45 EET		Report	Mihaylov 33' (o.g.); Baumann 35'; Frings 37'	Stadium: Vasil Levski National Stadium; Attendance: 40,000; Referee: Matteo Trefoloni (Italy)

22 November 2006 5	Levski Sofia (Bulgaria)	0–2	(Spain) Barcelona	Sofia, Bulgaria
21:45 EET		Report	Giuly 5'; Iniesta 65'	Stadium: Vasil Levski National Stadium; Attendance: 38,000; Referee: Yuri Baskakov (Russia)

5 December 2006 6	Chelsea (England)	2–0	(Bulgaria) Levski Sofia	London, England
19:45 GMT	Shevchenko 27'; Wright-Phillips 83'	Report		Stadium: Stamford Bridge; Attendance: 33,358; Referee: Alain Hamer (Luxembourg)

=== 2007–08 UEFA Champions League ===
31 July 2007 2QR 1st leg	Tampere United (Finland)	1–0	(Bulgaria) Levski Sofia	Tampere, Finland
19:00 EEST	Petrescu 15'	Report		Stadium: Tampere Stadium; Attendance: 8,126; Referee: Dougie McDonald (Scotland)

7 August 2007 2QR 2nd leg	Levski Sofia (Bulgaria)	0–1 (0–2 agg.)	(Finland) Tampere United	Sofia, Bulgaria
19:30 EEST		Report	Niemi 40'	Stadium: Vasil Levski National Stadium; Attendance: 11,704; Referee: Thorsten Kinhöfer (Germany)

=== 2008–09 UEFA Champions League ===
13 August 2008 3QR 1st leg	Levski Sofia (Bulgaria)	0–1	(Belarus) BATE Borisov	Sofia, Bulgaria
20:00 EEST		Report	Rzhevsky 60'	Stadium: Georgi Asparuhov; Attendance: 16,294; Referee: Jonas Eriksson (Sweden)

27 August 2008 3QR 1st leg	BATE Borisov (Belarus)	1–1 (2–1 agg.)	(Bulgaria) Levski Sofia	Barysaw, Belarus
20:00 MSK	Sosnovski 14'	Report	Gadzhev 38'	Stadium: Haradski Stadium; Attendance: 5,603; Referee: Konrad Plautz (Austria)

=== 2008–09 UEFA Cup ===
18 September 2008 1R 1st leg	Žilina (Slovakia)	1–1	(Bulgaria) Levski Sofia	Žilina, Slovakia
19:30 CEST	Vladavić 49' (pen.)	Report	Joãozinho 64'	Stadium: Štadión pod Dubňom; Attendance: 7,581; Referee: Paulo Costa (Portugal)

2 October 2008 1R 2nd leg	Levski Sofia (Bulgaria)	0–1 (1–2 agg.)	(Slovakia) Žilina	Sofia, Bulgaria
19:30 EEST		Report	Adauto 61'	Stadium: Georgi Asparuhov; Attendance: 10,150; Referee: Radek Matějek (Czech Republic)

=== 2009–10 UEFA Champions League ===
15 July 2009 2QR 1st leg	Levski Sofia (Bulgaria)	4–0	(Andorra) Sant Julià	Sofia, Bulgaria
19:45 EEST	Tasevski 50'; Hristov 64', 72'; Gadzhev 82'	Report		Stadium: Georgi Asparuhov; Attendance: 11,000; Referee: Levan Paniashvili (Georgia)

21 July 2009 2QR 2nd leg	Sant Julià (Andorra)	0–5 (0–9 agg.)	(Bulgaria) Levski Sofia	Andorra la Vella, Andorra
18:45 CEST		Report	Ognyanov 23', 40'; Yovov 34'; Tsachev 83'; Kirov 87'	Stadium: Estadi Comunal d'Aixovall; Attendance: 230; Referee: Jouny Hyytiä (Finland)

28 July 2009 3QR 1st leg	Baku (Azerbaijan)	0–0	(Bulgaria) Levski Sofia	Baku, Azerbaijan
19:00 AZT		Report		Stadium: Tofiq Bahramov Republican Stadium; Attendance: 25,500; Referee: Svein Oddvar Moen (Norway)

5 August 2009 3QR 2nd leg	Levski Sofia (Bulgaria)	2–0 (2–0 agg.)	(Azerbaijan) Baku	Sofia, Bulgaria
20:30 EEST	Yovov 64'; Hristov 80'	Report		Stadium: Georgi Asparuhov; Attendance: 13,500; Referee: Stefan Johannesson (Sweden)

19 August 2009 PO 1st leg	Levski Sofia (Bulgaria)	1–2	(Hungary) Debrecen	Sofia, Bulgaria
21:45 EEST	Bardon 51'	Report	Bodnár 12'; Czvitkovics 76'	Stadium: Georgi Asparuhov; Attendance: 14,524; Referee: Laurent Duhamel (France)

25 August 2009 PO 2nd leg	Debrecen (Hungary)	2–0 (4–1 agg.)	(Bulgaria) Levski Sofia	Budapest, Hungary
20:45 CEST	Varga 13'; Rudolf 35'	Report		Stadium: Ferenc Puskás; Attendance: 32,000; Referee: Claus Bo Larsen (Denmark)

=== 2009–10 UEFA Europa League ===
Group G

Pos	Team	Pld	W	D	L	GF	GA	GD	Pts	Qualification	SBG	VIL	LAZ	LS
1	(Austria) Red Bull Salzburg	6	6	0	0	9	2	+7	18	Advance to knockout phase	—	2–0	2–1	1–0
2	(Spain) Villarreal	6	3	0	3	8	6	+2	9	Advance to knockout phase	0–1	—	4–1	1–0
3	(Italy) Lazio	6	2	0	4	9	10	−1	6		1–2	2–1	—	0–1
4	(Bulgaria) Levski Sofia	6	1	0	5	1	9	−8	3		0–1	0–2	0–4	—

Source: Soccerway

17 September 2009 1	Villarreal (Spain)	1–0	(Bulgaria) Levski Sofia	Villarreal, Spain
21:05 CEST	Nilmar 72'	Report		Stadium: El Madrigal; Attendance: 5,244; Referee: Mike Dean (England)

1 October 2009 2	Levski Sofia (Bulgaria)	0–4	(Italy) Lazio	Sofia, Bulgaria
20:00 EEST		Report	Matuzalém 22'; Zárate 45+1'; Meghni 67'; Rocchi 74'	Stadium: Georgi Asparuhov; Attendance: 16,500; Referee: Nikolai Ivanov (Russia)

22 October 2009 3	Red Bull Salzburg (Austria)	1–0	(Bulgaria) Levski Sofia	Wals-Siezenheim, Austria
19:00 CEST	Švento 45+2'	Report		Stadium: Red Bull Arena; Attendance: 17,800; Referee: Hannes Kaasik (Estonia)

5 November 2009 4	Levski Sofia (Bulgaria)	0–1	(Austria) Red Bull Salzburg	Sofia, Bulgaria
22:05 EET		Report	Schiemer 90+3'	Stadium: Georgi Asparuhov; Attendance: 15,000; Referee: Cüneyt Çakır (Turkey)

2 December 2009 5	Levski Sofia (Bulgaria)	0–2	(Spain) Villarreal	Sofia, Bulgaria
20:00 EET		Report	Rossi 36'; Senna 84'	Stadium: Georgi Asparuhov; Attendance: 5,000; Referee: Paul Allaerts (Belgium)

17 December 2009 6	Lazio (Italy)	0–1	(Bulgaria) Levski Sofia	Rome, Italy
21:05 CET		Report	Yovov 61'	Stadium: Stadio Olimpico; Attendance: 8,051; Referee: William Collum (Scotland)

=== 2010–11 UEFA Europa League ===
15 July 2010 2QR 1st leg	Levski Sofia (Bulgaria)	6–0	(Republic of Ireland) Dundalk	Sofia, Bulgaria
20:45 EEST	Yovov 12'; Mladenov 14', 46'; Dembélé 42'; Isa 86', 90+4'	Report		Stadium: Georgi Asparuhov; Attendance: 8,200; Referee: Daniele Orsato (Italy)

22 July 2010 2QR 2nd leg	Dundalk (Republic of Ireland)	0–2 (0–8 agg.)	(Bulgaria) Levski Sofia	Dundalk, Republic of Ireland
19:00 IST		Report	Dembélé 4', 33'	Stadium: Oriel Park; Attendance: 1,000; Referee: Fırat Aydınus (Turkey)

29 July 2010 3QR 1st leg	Kalmar (Sweden)	1–1	(Bulgaria) Levski Sofia	Kalmar, Sweden
19:30 CEST	Dauda 83'	Report	Joãozinho 28'	Stadium: Fredriksskans; Attendance: 2,489; Referee: Boško Jovanetić (Serbia)

5 August 2010 3QR 2nd leg	Levski Sofia (Bulgaria)	5–2 (6–3 agg.)	(Sweden) Kalmar	Sofia, Bulgaria
20:45 EEST	Dembélé 12', 70'; Mladenov 33'; Isa 90+1', 90+2'	Report	Johansson 82'; Israelsson 84'	Stadium: Georgi Asparuhov; Attendance: 9,470; Referee: Antony Gautier (France)

19 August 2010 PO 1st leg	AIK (Sweden)	0–0	(Bulgaria) Levski Sofia	Solna, Sweden
19:00 CEST		Report		Stadium: Råsunda Stadium; Attendance: 8,212; Referee: Pavel Královec (Czech Republic)

26 August 2010 PO 2nd leg	Levski Sofia (Bulgaria)	2–1 (2–1 agg.)	(Sweden) AIK	Sofia, Bulgaria
20:30 EEST	Mladenov 49'; Dembélé 51'	Report	Bangura 11'	Stadium: Georgi Asparuhov; Attendance: 18,000; Referee: Viktor Shvetsov (Ukraine)

Group C

Pos	Team	Pld	W	D	L	GF	GA	GD	Pts	Qualification	SCP	LIL	GNT	LS
1	(Portugal) Sporting CP	6	4	0	2	14	6	+8	12	Advance to knockout phase	—	1–0	5–1	5–0
2	(France) Lille	6	2	2	2	8	6	+2	8	Advance to knockout phase	1–2	—	3–0	1–0
3	(Belgium) Gent	6	2	1	3	8	13	−5	7		3–1	1–1	—	1–0
4	(Bulgaria) Levski Sofia	6	2	1	3	6	11	−5	7		1–0	2–2	3–2	—

Source: Soccerway

16 September 2010 1	Levski Sofia (Bulgaria)	3–2	(Belgium) Gent	Sofia, Bulgaria
20:00 EEST	Joãozinho 42'; Dembélé 60'; Greene 84'	Report	Azofeifa 23'; Šuler 48'	Stadium: Georgi Asparuhov; Attendance: 22,240; Referee: Zsolt Szabó (Hungary)

30 September 2010 2	Sporting CP (Portugal)	5–0	(Bulgaria) Levski Sofia	Lisbon, Portugal
20:05 WEST	Carriço 30'; Maniche 43'; Salomão 53'; Postiga 61'; Fernández 79'	Report		Stadium: Estádio José Alvalade; Attendance: 15,081; Referee: Sascha Kever (Switzerland)

21 October 2010 3	Lille (France)	1–0	(Bulgaria) Levski Sofia	Villeneuve-d'Ascq, France
21:05 CEST	Chedjou 49'	Report		Stadium: Lille Métropole; Attendance: 14,646; Referee: Kristinn Jakobsson (Iceland)

4 November 2010 4	Levski Sofia (Bulgaria)	2–2	(France) Lille	Sofia, Bulgaria
20:00 EET	Dembélé 11'; Gadzhev 82'	Report	de Melo 35'; I. Ivanov 88' (o.g.)	Stadium: Georgi Asparuhov; Attendance: 17,440; Referee: Milorad Mažić (Serbia)

1 December 2010 5	Gent (Belgium)	1–0	(Bulgaria) Levski Sofia	Ghent, Belgium
21:05 CET	Wallace 77'	Report		Stadium: Jules Ottenstadion; Attendance: 8,662; Referee: Tommy Skjerven (Norway)

16 December 2010 6	Levski Sofia (Bulgaria)	1–0	(Portugal) Sporting CP	Sofia, Bulgaria
20:00 EET	Mladenov 45'	Report		Stadium: Georgi Asparuhov; Attendance: 5,000; Referee: Thorsten Kinhöfer (Germany)

=== 2011–12 UEFA Europa League ===
28 July 2011 3QR 1st leg	Levski Sofia (Bulgaria)	2–1	(Slovakia) Spartak Trnava	Sofia, Bulgaria
20:45 EEST	Gadzhev 89'; Ars 90+2'	Report	Tomaček 80' (pen.)	Stadium: Georgi Asparuhov; Attendance: 11,900; Referee: Serhiy Boyko (Ukraine)

4 August 2011 3QR 2nd leg	Spartak Trnava (Slovakia)	2–1 (a.e.t.) (3–3 agg.) (5–4 p)	(Bulgaria) Levski Sofia	Trnava, Slovakia
19:00 CEST	Tomaček 52', 59' (pen.)	Report	Ars 11'	Stadium: Antona Malatinského; Attendance: 12,159; Referee: Ken Henry Johnsen (Norway)
	Penalties
	Karhan (penalty scored); Hanzel (penalty scored); Procházka (penalty scored); Tomaček (penalty scored); Kaščák (penalty scored)		(penalty missed) Yovov; (penalty scored) Ars; (penalty scored) Gadzhev; (penalty scored) Calvo; (penalty scored) Raykov

=== 2012–13 UEFA Europa League ===
19 July 2012 2QR 1st leg	Levski Sofia (Bulgaria)	1–0	(Bosnia and Herzegovina) Sarajevo	Sofia, Bulgaria
20:00 EEST	Raykov 72'	Report		Stadium: Georgi Asparuhov; Attendance: 12,552; Referee: Bruno Paixão (Portugal)

26 July 2012 2QR 2nd leg	Sarajevo (Bosnia and Herzegovina)	3–1 (3–2 agg.)	(Bulgaria) Levski Sofia	Sarajevo, Bosnia and Herzegovina
21:00 CEST	Husejinović 12', 62'; Suljić 14'	Report	de Carvalho 34' (pen.)	Stadium: Asim Ferhatović Hase; Attendance: 11,122; Referee: Cristian Balaj (Romania)

=== 2013–14 UEFA Europa League ===
4 July 2013 1QR 1st leg	Levski Sofia (Bulgaria)	0–0	(Kazakhstan) Irtysh	Sofia, Bulgaria
21:00 EEST		Report		Stadium: Georgi Asparuhov; Attendance: 5,945; Referee: Orel Grinfeld (Israel)

11 July 2013 1QR 2nd leg	Irtysh (Kazakhstan)	2–0 (2–0 agg.)	(Bulgaria) Levski Sofia	Pavlodar, Kazakhstan
19:00 KZT	Murzoev 6'; Bakayev 13' (pen.)	Report		Stadium: Central Stadium; Attendance: 9,500; Referee: Alexander Harkam (Austria)

=== 2016–17 UEFA Europa League ===
14 July 2016 2QR 1st leg	Maribor (Slovenia)	0–0	(Bulgaria) Levski Sofia	Maribor, Slovenia
20:00 CEST		Report		Stadium: Ljudski vrt Attendance: 7,345; Referee: Cristian Balaj (Romania)

21 July 2016 2QR 2nd leg	Levski Sofia (Bulgaria)	1–1 (1–1 (a) agg.)	(Slovenia) Maribor	Sofia, Bulgaria
20:00 EEST	Narh 22'	Report	Tavares 68'	Stadium: Georgi Asparuhov; Attendance: 17,600; Referee: Michael Tykgaard (Denmark)

=== 2017–18 UEFA Europa League ===
29 June 2017 1QR 1st leg	Levski Sofia (Bulgaria)	3–1	(Montenegro) Sutjeska	Sofia, Bulgaria
20:00 EEST	Mapuku 1', 21'; Procházka 45+1'	Report	Marković 79'	Stadium: Vivacom Arena - Georgi Asparuhov; Attendance: 6,456; Referee: Martin Lundby (Norway)

6 July 2017 1QR 2nd leg	Sutjeska (Montenegro)	0–0 (1–3 agg.)	(Bulgaria) Levski Sofia	Nikšić, Montenegro
20:30 CEST		Report		Stadium: Gradski stadion Attendance: 3,500; Referee: Dimitrios Massias (Cyprus)

13 July 2017 2QR 1st leg	Hajduk Split (Croatia)	1–0	(Bulgaria) Levski Sofia	Dugopolje, Croatia
20:30 CEST	Futács 24' (pen.)	Report		Stadium: Hrvatski vitezovi Attendance: 5,000; Referee: Mohammed Al-Hakim (Sweden)

20 July 2017 2QR 2nd leg	Levski Sofia (Bulgaria)	1–2 (1–3 agg.)	(Croatia) Hajduk Split	Sofia, Bulgaria
20:00 EEST	Buș 69'	Report	Ohandza 80'; Erceg 86'	Stadium: Vivacom Arena - Georgi Asparuhov; Attendance: 0 Referee: Ali Palabıyık (Turkey)

=== 2018–19 UEFA Europa League ===
11 July 2018 1QR 1st leg	Vaduz (Liechtenstein)	1–0	(Bulgaria) Levski Sofia	Vaduz, Liechtenstein
17:45 CEST	Coulibaly 14'	Report		Stadium: Rheinpark Stadion; Attendance: 1,243; Referee: Fran Jović (Croatia)

17 July 2018 1QR 2nd leg	Levski Sofia (Bulgaria)	3–2 (3–3 (a) agg.)	(Liechtenstein) Vaduz	Sofia, Bulgaria
18:45 EEST	Buș 35'; Belaïd 53'; Cabral 85'	Report	Coulibaly 25'; Tadić 55'	Stadium: Vivacom Arena - Georgi Asparuhov; Attendance: 6,100; Referee: Rob Harvey (Republic of Ireland)

=== 2019–20 UEFA Europa League ===
11 July 2019 1QR 1st leg	Ružomberok (Slovakia)	0–2	(Bulgaria) Levski Sofia	Ružomberok, Slovakia
18:30 CEST		Report	Mariani 36'; Paulinho 51'	Stadium: Štadión pod Čebraťom; Attendance: 3,695; Referee: Petri Viljanen (Finland)

18 July 2019 1QR 2nd leg	Levski Sofia (Bulgaria)	2–0 (4–0 agg.)	(Slovakia) Ružomberok	Sofia, Bulgaria
19:30 EEST	Mariani 33'; Alar 90+2'	Report		Stadium: Vivacom Arena - Georgi Asparuhov; Attendance: 400; Referee: Veaceslav Banari (Moldova)

25 July 2019 2QR 1st leg	AEK Larnaca (Cyprus)	3–0	(Bulgaria) Levski Sofia	Larnaca, Cyprus
18:30 EEST	Giannou 67'; Raúl 70'; Hevel 75'	Report		Stadium: AEK Arena – Georgios Karapatakis; Attendance: 3,177; Referee: Tiago Martins (Portugal)

1 August 2019 2QR 2nd leg	Levski Sofia (Bulgaria)	0–4 (0–7 agg.)	(Cyprus) AEK Larnaca	Sofia, Bulgaria
19:30 EEST		Report	Trichkovski 8' (pen.), 29', 75', 82'	Stadium: Vivacom Arena - Georgi Asparuhov; Attendance: 550; Referee: Glenn Nyberg (Sweden)

=== 2022–23 UEFA Europa Conference League ===
21 July 2022 2QR 1st leg	Levski Sofia (Bulgaria)	2–0	(Greece) PAOK	Sofia, Bulgaria
20:00 EEST	Welton Felipe 1'; Bari 19'	Report		Stadium: Vivacom Arena - Georgi Asparuhov; Attendance: 17,534; Referee: Jérémie Pignard (France)

28 July 2022 2QR 2nd leg	PAOK (Greece)	1–1 (1–3 agg.)	(Bulgaria) Levski Sofia	Thessaloniki, Greece
20:30 EEST	Dantas 56'	Report	Ronaldo 25'	Stadium: Toumba; Attendance: 15,000; Referee: César Soto Grado (Spain)

4 August 2022 3QR 1st leg	Hamrun Spartans (Malta)	0–1	(Bulgaria) Levski Sofia	Ta' Qali, Malta
19:30 CEST		Report	Krastev 90+5'	Stadium: National Stadium; Attendance: 3,135; Referee: Willy Delajod (France)

11 August 2022 3QR 2nd leg	Levski Sofia (Bulgaria)	1–2 (a.e.t.) (2–2 agg.) (1–4 p)	(Malta) Hamrun Spartans	Sofia, Bulgaria
21:00 EEST	Tsunami 90+1'	Report	Guillaumier 78'; Camenzuli 90+2'	Stadium: Vivacom Arena - Georgi Asparuhov; Attendance: 16,480; Referee: István Kovács (Romania)
	Penalties
	Petkov (penalty scored); Tsunami (penalty missed); Krastev (penalty missed)		(penalty scored) Freitas; (penalty scored) Montebello; (penalty scored) Guillaumier; (penalty scored) Fedele

=== 2023–24 UEFA Europa Conference League ===
27 July 2023 2QR 1st leg	Shkupi (North Macedonia)	0–2	(Bulgaria) Levski Sofia	Skopje, North Macedonia
21:00 CEST		Report	Welton Felipe 31'; Ronaldo 90+4'	Stadium: Toše Proeski Arena; Attendance: 6,000; Referee: David Fuxman (Israel)

3 August 2023 2QR 2nd leg	Levski Sofia (Bulgaria)	1–0 (3–0 agg.)	(North Macedonia) Shkupi	Sofia, Bulgaria
20:00 EEST	Petkov 90+11'	Report		Stadium: Vivacom Arena - Georgi Asparuhov; Attendance: 16,424; Referee: Lionel Tschudi (Switzerland)

10 August 2023 3QR 1st leg	Hapoel Be'er Sheva (Israel)	0–0	(Bulgaria) Levski Sofia	Be'er Sheva, Israel
20:30 IDT		Report		Stadium: Turner Stadium; Attendance: 8,974; Referee: Miguel Nogueira (Portugal)

17 August 2023 3QR 2nd leg	Levski Sofia (Bulgaria)	2–1 (2–1 agg.)	(Israel) Hapoel Be'er Sheva	Sofia, Bulgaria
20:00 EEST	Welton Felipe 15'; Ronaldo 90+6'	Report	Stoyanov 79'	Stadium: Vivacom Arena - Georgi Asparuhov; Attendance: 16,832; Referee: Dumitri Muntean (Moldova)

24 August 2023 PO 1st leg	Levski Sofia (Bulgaria)	1–1	(Germany) Eintracht Frankfurt	Sofia, Bulgaria
20:00 EEST	Fadiga 90+5'	Report	Kolo Muani 6'	Stadium: Vasil Levski National Stadium; Attendance: 35,000; Referee: Adam Ladebäck (Sweden)

31 August 2023 PO 2nd leg	Eintracht Frankfurt (Germany)	2–0 (3–1 agg.)	(Bulgaria) Levski Sofia	Frankfurt, Germany
20:30 CEST	Ngankam 79'; Skhiri 86'	Report		Stadium: Deutsche Bank Park; Attendance: 46,000; Referee: Allard Lindhout (Netherlands)

=== 2025–26 UEFA Europa League ===
10 July 2025 1QR 1st leg	Levski Sofia (Bulgaria)	0–0	(Israel) Hapoel Be'er Sheva	Sofia, Bulgaria
20:30 EEST		Report		Stadium: Georgi Asparuhov; Attendance: 15,467; Referee: Ladislav Szikszay (Czech Republic)

17 July 2025 1QR 2nd leg	Hapoel Be'er Sheva (Israel)	1–1 (a.e.t.) (1–1 agg.) (1–3 p)	(Bulgaria) Levski Sofia	Nyíregyháza, Hungary
20:00 CEST	Turgeman 105+3'	Report	Sangaré 114'	Stadium: Városi Stadion; Attendance: 721; Referee: Florian Badstübner (Germany)
	Penalties
	Almog (penalty missed); Kangwa (penalty missed); Turgeman (penalty missed); Levy (penalty scored)		(penalty missed) Rupanov; (penalty scored) Fabien; (penalty scored) Makoun; (penalty scored) Sangaré

24 July 2025 2QR 1st leg	Levski Sofia (Bulgaria)	0–0	(Portugal) Braga	Sofia, Bulgaria
20:30 EEST		Report		Stadium: Georgi Asparuhov; Attendance: 16,040; Referee: Matteo Marchetti (Italy)

31 July 2025 2QR 2nd leg	Braga (Portugal)	1–0 (a.e.t.) (1–0 agg.)	(Bulgaria) Levski Sofia	Braga, Portugal
20:00 WEST	Fran Navarro 104'	Report		Stadium: Estádio Municipal; Attendance: 16,771; Referee: Lothar D'hondt (Belgium)

=== 2025–26 UEFA Conference League ===
7 August 2025 3QR 1st leg	Levski Sofia (Bulgaria)	1–0	(Azerbaijan) Sabah	Sofia, Bulgaria
21:00 EEST	Rupanov 90+8'	Report		Stadium: Georgi Asparuhov; Attendance: 16,163; Referee: Duje Strukan (Croatia)

14 August 2025 3QR 2nd leg	Sabah (Azerbaijan)	0–2 (0–3 agg.)	(Bulgaria) Levski Sofia	Masazir, Azerbaijan
20:00 AZT		Report	Kirilov 40'; Soula 87'	Stadium: Bank Respublika Arena; Attendance: 6,606; Referee: Mykola Balakin (Ukraine)

21 August 2025 PO 1st leg	Levski Sofia (Bulgaria)	0–2	(Netherlands) AZ	Sofia, Bulgaria
21:00 EEST		Report	Sadiq 56'; Parrott 62'	Stadium: Vasil Levski National Stadium; Attendance: 29,930; Referee: Tamás Bognár (Hungary)

28 August 2025 PO 2nd leg	AZ (Netherlands)	4–1 (6–1 agg.)	(Bulgaria) Levski Sofia	Alkmaar, Netherlands
19:30 CEST	Sadiq 3', 45+1'; Meerdink 6'; Zeefuik 86'	Report	Everton 47'	Stadium: AFAS Stadion; Attendance: 12,612; Referee: Damian Sylwestrzak (Poland)

=== 2026–27 UEFA Champions League ===
7 July 2026 1QR 1st leg	Borac Banja Luka (Bosnia and Herzegovina)	1–1	(Bulgaria) Levski Sofia	Banja Luka, Bosnia and Herzegovina
20:30 CEST	Juričić 9' (pen.)	Report	Oko-Flex 55'	Stadium: Banja Luka City Stadium; Attendance: 10,102; Referee: Mehmet Türkmen (Turkey)

14 July 2026 1QR 2nd leg	Levski Sofia (Bulgaria)	4–0 (5–1 agg.)	(Bosnia and Herzegovina) Borac Banja Luka	Sofia, Bulgaria
20:30 EEST	Oko-Flex 48'; Reinaldo 59', 65'; Perea 85'	Report		Stadium: Georgi Asparuhov; Attendance: 17,325; Referee: Andrew Madley (England)

22 July 2026 2QR 1st leg	Levski Sofia (Bulgaria)	1–0	(Romania) Universitatea Craiova	Sofia, Bulgaria
20:30 EEST	Kristian Dimitrov 8'	Report		Stadium: Georgi Asparuhov; Attendance: 16,118; Referee: Adam Ladebäck (Sweden)

29 July 2026 2QR 2nd leg	Universitatea Craiova (Romania)	2–2 (2–3 agg.)	(Bulgaria) Levski Sofia	Craiova, Romania
20:30 EEST	Bancu 45+2'; Rus 48'	Report	Everton Bala 13'; Aldair Neves 16'	Stadium: Ion Oblemenco Stadium; Attendance: 27,037; Referee: Matteo Marcenaro (Italia)

4 August 2026 3QR; 1st leg	Levski Sofia (Bulgaria)	1–0	Kaïrat Almaty (Kazakhstan)	Sofia, Bulgaria
20:30 EEST	Serginho 90+2'	Report		Stadium: Georgi Asparuhov; Attendance: 16,916; Referee: Donatas Rumšas (Lithuania)
