= 1998 Bulgarian Cup final =

- Event: 1997–98 Bulgarian Cup
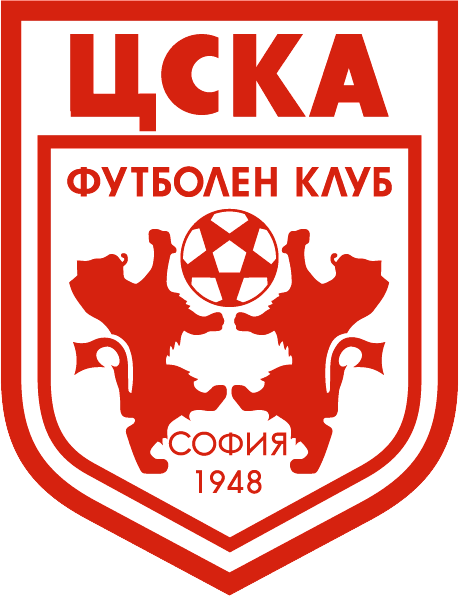

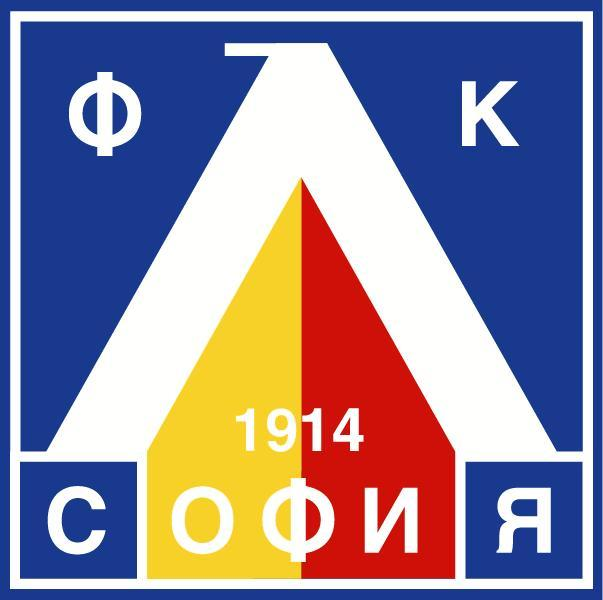
| CSKA Sofia | Levski Sofia |
| 0 | 5 |
- Date: 13 May 1998
- Venue: Vasil Levski Stadium, Sofia
- Man of the Match: Doncho Donev
- Referee: Markus Merk (Germany)
- Attendance: 50,000

The 1998 Bulgarian Cup final was played at the Vasil Levski National Stadium in Sofia on 13 May 1998, and was contested between the sides of CSKA Sofia and Levski Sofia. The match was won by Levski Sofia, thus they achieved their 20th national cup.

== Route to the Final ==
| CSKA | | Round | Levski |
|---|---|---|---|---|
| Opponent | Result | | Opponent | Result |
| Rodopa Smolyan | 1–0 away | Round of 32 | Planinets Apriltsi | 4–0 away |
| Botev Plovdiv | 0–0 away; 2–0 home | Round of 16 | Etar Veliko Tarnovo | 4–1 away; 2–0 home |
| Slavia Sofia | 1–1 away; 4–2 home | Quarter-finals | Velbazhd Kyustendil | 2–0 home; 1–2 away |
| Litex Lovech | 1–3 home; 3–0 away | Semi-finals | Lokomotiv Sofia | 2–1 away; 3–2 home |

== Match ==
=== Details ===
13 May 1998
18:00 EEST

| CSKA Sofia | 0–5 | Levski Sofia |
|---|---|---|
| | | Todorov 14'; Aleksandrov 32'; Donev 48'; G. Ivanov 72'; Yordanov 90' (o.g.) |

Vasil Levski National Stadium, Sofia
Attendance: 50,000
Referee: Markus Merk (Germany)

| CSKA | Levski |

CSKA:
| GK | 1 | (Bulgaria) Radostin Stanev |
| DF | 2 | (Bulgaria) Emil Kremenliev |
| DF | 5 | (Bulgaria) Dobromir Mitov | | (substituted off) 55' |
| DF | 6 | (Bulgaria) Anton Bachev |
| DF | 11 | (Bulgaria) Georgi Yordanov |
| MF | 3 | (Bulgaria) Milen Petkov |
| MF | 4 | (Bulgaria) Krasimir Chomakov |
| MF | 8 | (Bulgaria) Stiliyan Petrov | | (substituted off) 26' |
| MF | 10 | (Bulgaria) Boncho Genchev | (yellow card) 34' | (substituted off) 52' |
| FW | 7 | (Bulgaria) Emil Kostadinov (c) |
| FW | 9 | (Bulgaria) Petar Zhabov |
Substitutes:
| GK | 12 | (Bulgaria) Petko Petkov |
| FW | 13 | (Bulgaria) Martin Petrov |
| DF | 14 | (Bulgaria) Mihail Yumerski | | (substituted in) 55' |
| FW | 15 | (Bulgaria) Ivaylo Andonov | | (substituted in) 52' |
| MF | 16 | (Bulgaria) Atanas Georgiev | | (substituted in) 26' |
| DF | 17 | (Bulgaria) Ivan Paskov |
| FW | 18 | (Bulgaria) Hristo Stoichkov |
Manager:
(Bulgaria) Petar Zehtinski

Levski:
| GK | 1 | (Bulgaria) Dimitar Ivankov |
| DF | 2 | (Bulgaria) Vladimir Ivanov |
| DF | 4 | (Bulgaria) Milen Radukanov |
| DF | 5 | (Bulgaria) Ivan Vasilev |
| DF | 10 | (Bulgaria) Nikolay Todorov (c) |
| MF | 6 | (Bulgaria) Vladimir Yonkov | (yellow card) 37' |
| MF | 7 | (Bulgaria) Viktorio Pavlov | | (substituted off) 29' |
| MF | 8 | (Bulgaria) Aleksandar Aleksandrov | | (substituted off) 69' |
| FW | 3 | (Bulgaria) Doncho Donev |
| FW | 9 | (Bulgaria) Georgi Ivanov |
| FW | 11 | (Bulgaria) Georgi Borisov | | (substituted off) 81' |
Substitutes:
| GK | 12 | (Bulgaria) Georgi Sheytanov |
| MF | 13 | (Bulgaria) Martin Goranov |
| DF | 14 | (Bulgaria) Vladislav Stoykov |
| MF | 15 | (Bulgaria) Asen Nikolov | | (substituted in) 69' |
| FW | 16 | (Bulgaria) Iliyan Simeonov | | (substituted in) 81' |
| DF | 18 | (Bulgaria) Veselin Vachev |
| MF | 21 | (Bulgaria) Yordan Marinov | | (substituted in) 29' |
Manager:
(Bulgaria) Mihail Valchev

== See also ==
- 1997–98 A Group
