= 2006–07 B Group =

Bulgarian B Group
- Season: 2006–07
- Champions: Pirin (West); Chernomorets (East)
- Promoted: Pirin; Chernomorets; Vidima-Rakovski
- Relegated: Vihar; Hebar; Minyor Bobov Dol; Dobrudzha; Lokomotiv Stara Zagora
- Matches: 364
- Goals: 951 (2.61 per match)

The 2006–07 B Group was the 51st season of the Bulgarian B Football Group, the second tier of the Bulgarian football league system. The season started on 12 August 2006 and finished on 2 June 2007 with the A Group promotion play-off between the runners-up from both divisions.

== East B Group ==
Pos	Team	Pld	W	D	L	GF	GA	GD	Pts	Promotion or relegation
1	Chernomorets Burgas (P)	26	19	6	1	57	20	+37	63	Promotion to 2007–08 A Group
2	Naftex Burgas	26	17	9	0	51	10	+41	60	Qualification for Promotion play-off
3	Haskovo	26	12	7	7	38	27	+11	43	
4	Nesebar	26	12	4	10	40	32	+8	40	
5	Dunav Ruse	26	10	9	7	46	35	+11	39	
6	Spartak Plovdiv	26	11	5	10	32	28	+4	38	
7	Shumen	26	10	7	9	29	36	−7	37	
8	Kaliakra Kavarna	26	10	6	10	25	31	−6	36	
9	Svetkavitsa Targovishte	26	10	4	12	37	41	−4	34	
10	Maritsa Plovdiv	26	9	5	12	35	37	−2	32	
11	AKB Minyor Radnevo	26	7	4	15	34	45	−11	25	
12	Sliven	26	4	11	11	32	52	−20	23	
13	Dobrudzha Dobrich (R)	26	5	5	16	25	51	−26	20	Relegation to 2007–08 V Group
14	Lokomotiv Stara Zagora (R)	26	3	4	19	22	58	−36	13	Relegation to 2007–08 V Group

Source: Soccerway
Rules for classification: 1) points; 2) goal difference; 3) number of goals scored.
(P) Promoted; (R) Relegated

=== Top scorers ===
Rank	Scorer	Club	Goals
1	(Bulgaria) Miroslav Mindev	Sliven	18
2	(Bulgaria) Petar Kanchev	Nesebar	17
3	(Bulgaria) Ivaylo Pargov	Naftex Burgas	14

== West B Group ==
Pos	Team	Pld	W	D	L	GF	GA	GD	Pts	Promotion or relegation
1	Pirin Blagoevgrad (P)	26	18	6	2	41	11	+30	60	Promotion to 2007–08 A Group
2	Vidima-Rakovski Sevlievo (P)	26	15	8	3	50	24	+26	53	Qualification for Promotion play-off
3	Pirin Gotse Delchev	26	13	3	10	38	30	+8	42	
4	Vihar Gorublyane (Note: Did not receive a license for professional football for the next season) (R)	26	10	10	6	33	27	+6	40	Relegation to 2007–08 V Group
5	Spartak Pleven	26	10	8	8	32	27	+5	38	
6	Etar 1924	26	10	5	11	36	34	+2	35	
7	Chavdar Byala Slatina	26	9	5	12	28	32	−4	32	
8	Minyor Pernik	26	8	8	10	30	32	−2	32	
9	Velbazhd Kyustendil	26	9	5	12	37	44	−7	32	
10	Montana	26	8	8	10	30	33	−3	32	
11	Belite Orli Pleven	26	9	4	13	27	30	−3	31	
12	Lokomotiv Mezdra	26	7	8	11	27	42	−15	29	
13	Hebar Pazardzhik (R)	26	7	4	15	22	41	−19	25	Relegation to 2007–08 V Group
14	Minyor Bobov Dol (R)	26	5	6	15	18	42	−24	21	Relegation to 2007–08 V Group

Source: Soccerway
Rules for classification: 1) points; 2) goal difference; 3) number of goals scored.
(P) Promoted; (R) Relegated

=== Top scorers ===
Rank	Scorer	Club	Goals
1	(Bulgaria) Borislav Dichev	Vidima-Rakovski	20
2	(Bulgaria) Veselin Stoykov	Pirin Blagoevgrad	13
3	(Bulgaria) Mariyan Genov	Etar 1924	11

== Promotion play-off ==
2 June 2007

Naftex Burgas	0−1 (a.e.t.)	Vidima-Rakovski Sevlievo
		Karakanov 109' (o.g.)

Beroe, Stara Zagora
Attendance: 2,000

== See also ==
- Bulgarian football league system
- 2006–07 A Group
- 2006–07 Bulgarian Cup
- Third Amateur Football League (Bulgaria)
- PFC Vidima-Rakovski Sevlievo
- FC Pirin Blagoevgrad
- PSFC Chernomorets Burgas
