= 1997–98 Bulgarian Cup =

Tournament details
- Country: Bulgaria

Final positions
- Champions: Levski Sofia (20th cup)
- Runners-up: CSKA Sofia

The 1997–98 Bulgarian Cup was the 58th season of the Bulgarian Cup. Levski Sofia won the competition, beating CSKA Sofia 5–0 in the final at the Vasil Levski National Stadium in Sofia.

== First round ==
| Team 1 | Score | Team 2 |
11 November 1997
| Planinets Apriltsi (IV) | 0–4 | Levski Sofia (I) |
| Belite Orli Pleven (III) | 0–1 | Lokomotiv Sofia (I) |
| Maritsa Plovdiv (II) | 2–2 (a.e.t.) (6–7 p) | Botev Plovdiv (I) |
12 November 1997
| Rodopa Smolyan (III) | 0–1 | CSKA Sofia (I) |
| Septemvri Sofia (II) | 0–1 (a.e.t.) | Slavia Sofia (I) |
| Litex Lovech (I) | 2–1 | Kremikovtsi (II) |
| Chardafon Gabrovo (II) | 0–4 | Neftochimic Burgas (I) |
| Chirpan (III) | 0–4 | Levski Kyustendil (I) |
| Energetik Pernik (III) | 0–3 | Minyor Pernik (I) |
| Hebar Pazardzhik (III) | 2–4 | Spartak Varna (I) |
| Vihar Gorublyane (III) | 1–0 | Metalurg Pernik (I) |
| Spartak Pleven (I) | 1–0 | Akademik Sofia (II) |
| Zagorets Nova Zagora (III) | 0–1 | Etar Veliko Tarnovo (I) |
| Chernomorets Burgas (II) | 1–1 (a.e.t.) (8–9 p) | Dobrudzha Dobrich (I) |
| Kaliakra Kavarna (III) | 1–0 | Olimpik Galata (I) |
| Haskovo (II) | 2–1 | Lokomotiv Plovdiv (I) |

== Second round ==
| Team 1 | Agg. | Team 2 | 1st leg | 2nd leg |
18, 19 November / 28, 29 November 1997
| Etar Veliko Tarnovo (I) | 1–6 | Levski Sofia (I) | 1–4 | 0–2 |
| Botev Plovdiv (I) | 0–2 | CSKA Sofia (I) | 0–0 | 0–2 |
| Neftochimic Burgas (I) | 1–2 | Slavia Sofia (I) | 1–0 | 0–2 |
| Dobrudzha Dobrich (I) | 2–9 | Litex Lovech (I) | 2–1 | 0–8 |
| Spartak Varna (I) | 9–3 | Vihar Gorublyane (III) | 8–0 | 1–3 |
| Lokomotiv Sofia (I) | 10–0 | Kaliakra Kavarna (III) | 6–0 | 4–0 |
| Levski Kyustendil (I) | 4–2 | Minyor Pernik (I) | 3–0 | 1–2 |
| Spartak Pleven (I) | 5–2 | Haskovo (II) | 2–0 | 3–2 |

== Quarter-finals ==
| Team 1 | Agg. | Team 2 | 1st leg | 2nd leg |
3 / 13 December 1997
| Slavia Sofia (I) | 3–5 | CSKA Sofia (I) | 1–1 | 2–4 |
| Levski Sofia (I) | 3–2 | Levski Kyustendil (I) | 2–0 | 1–2 |
| Litex Lovech (I) | 8–1 | Spartak Pleven (I) | 5–1 | 3–0 |
| Lokomotiv Sofia (I) | 6–3 | Spartak Varna (I) | 4–1 | 2–2 |

== Semi-finals ==
=== First legs ===
| 15 April 1998 | Lokomotiv Sofia (I) | 1−2 | Levski Sofia (I) | Sofia |
| | Markov 79' | Report | Sirakov 35'; Borisov 57' | Stadium: Lokomotiv; Attendance: 18,000; Referee: Kostadin Gerginov (Sofia) |

| 15 April 1998 | CSKA Sofia (I) | 1−3 | Litex Lovech (I) | Sofia |
| | Stoichkov 51' | Report | Chomakov 36' (o.g.); Petkov 40'; Bushi 60' | Stadium: Balgarska Armiya; Attendance: 22,000; Referee: Stefan Ormandzhiev (Sofia) |

=== Second legs ===
| 6 May 1998 | Levski Sofia (I) | 3−2 (5−3 agg.) | Lokomotiv Sofia (I) | Sofia |
| | Yonkov 33'; Aleksandrov 68', 89' | Report | Vasev 25'; Dončić 44' | Stadium: Georgi Asparuhov; Attendance: 14,000; Referee: Mladen Blagoev (Sofia) |

| 6 May 1998 | Litex Lovech (I) | 0−3 (w/o)^{1} (3−4 agg.) | CSKA Sofia (I) | Lovech |
| | | | | Stadium: Gradski |

- ^{1}Litex Lovech were disqualified from the competition after first leg because were fielded an ineligible player Radostin Kishishev.

== Final ==
=== Details ===
13 May 1998
18:00 EEST

| CSKA Sofia | 0–5 | Levski Sofia |
|---|---|---|
| | | Todorov 14'; Aleksandrov 32'; Donev 48'; G. Ivanov 72'; Yordanov 90' (o.g.) |

Vasil Levski National Stadium, Sofia
Attendance: 50,000
Referee: Markus Merk (Germany)

| CSKA | Levski |
