= Mihail Valchev =

Bulgarian footballer

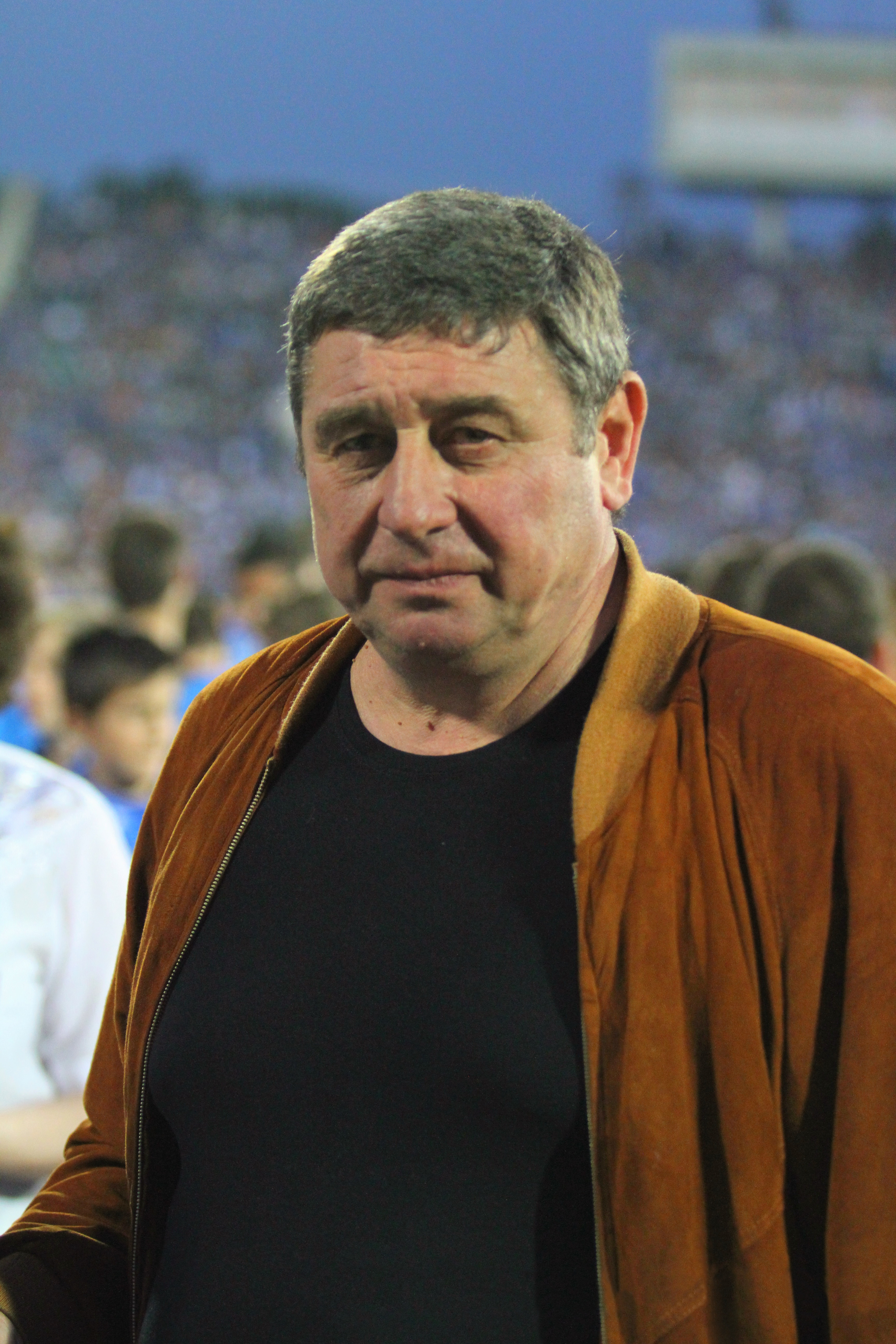

Personal information
- Full name: Mihail Dimitrov Valchev
- Date of birth: 13 October 1956 (age 70)
- Place of birth: Dalgopol, Bulgaria
- Height: 1.82 m (5 ft 11 1/2 in)
- Position: Forward

Senior career*
Years	Team	Apps	(Gls)
1979–1981	Akademik Sofia	68	(38)
1981–1986	Levski Sofia	131	(79)
1986–1987	Doxa Drama	24	(13)
1987–1988	Rilski Sportist	?	(?)
1988–1990	Doxa Drama	34	(5)

International career
1976–1978	Bulgaria U21	26	(12)
1981–1984	Bulgaria	14	(2)

Managerial career
- 1998: Levski Sofia
- 2000–2001: Rilski Sportist
- 2001: Chernomorets Burgas
- 2002: Levski Dolna Banya
- 2002: Belasitsa Petrich
- 2002–2003: Rilski Sportist
- * Club domestic league appearances and goals

Mihail Valchev (Bulgarian: Михаил Вълчев; born 13 October 1956) is a former Bulgarian footballer who played as a forward. In his career he played mostly for Akademik Sofia and Levski Sofia.

== Career ==
In 1979 Valchev joined Akademik Sofia, where he scored 38 goals for two seasons. In 1981 he left to join Levski Sofia, where he won two Bulgarian League titles, two Bulgarian Cups and one Cup of the Soviet Army. Valchev had a successful start to his career at the club by being the league's top goalscorer in its inaugural season, scoring 24 goals. Between 1981 and 1986 he scored 109 goals in 177 matches for the club in all competitions. In 1983, Valchev scored two goals for Levski against one of the biggest German clubs VfB Stuttgart with which Levski eliminated the Bundesliga team.

In March 1998, Valchev was appointed Levski Sofia manager and led the team to a famous 5–0 win over city rivals CSKA Sofia in the 1998 Bulgarian Cup Final. As a manager, he has worked also for Kremikovtsi Sofia, Rilski Sportist Samokov, Chernomorets Burgas, Levski Dolna Banya and Belasitsa Petrich.

== Honours ==
=== Player ===
Levski Sofia

- Bulgarian League (2): 1983–84, 1984–85
- Bulgarian Cup (2): 1983–84, 1985–86
- Cup of the Soviet Army: 1983–84

=== Manager ===
Levski Sofia

- Bulgarian Cup: 1997–98

=== Individual ===
- Bulgarian League Top Scorer: 1982 (with 24 goals)
