= Ivan Vasilev (footballer, born 1967) =

Bulgarian footballer

Personal information
- Full name: Ivan Vasilev Stefanov
- Date of birth: 13 June 1967 (age 59)
- Place of birth: Kazanlak, Bulgaria
- Height: 1.85 m (6 ft 1 in)
- Position: Defender

Senior career*
| Years | Team | Apps | (Gls) |
| 1983–1993 | Sliven | 180 | (13) |
| 1993–1994 | Lokomotiv GO | 35 | (2) |
| 1995–1998 | Levski Sofia | 93 | (3) |
| 1999 | Kremikovtsi Sofia | 12 | (1) |
| 1999–2001 | Valletta | 37 | (3) |
| Total | | 357 | (22) |

International career
| 1996 | Bulgaria | 1 | (0) |
- * Club domestic league appearances and goals

Ivan Vasilev Stefanov (Bulgarian: Иван Василев Стефанов) (born 13 June 1967) is a Bulgarian retired football defender.

== Club playing honours ==
Sliven

- Bulgarian Cup: 1990

Levski Sofia

- A PFG: 1994–95
- A PFG: runner-up 1995–96, 1997–98
- Bulgarian Cup: 1998

Valletta

- Maltese Premier League: 2000–01
