= Iliyan Simeonov =

Bulgarian footballer

Personal information
- Date of birth: 12 January 1974 (age 52)
- Position: Forward

Senior career*
Years	Team	Apps	(Gls)
1994–1998	Levski Sofia	74	(24)
1998–1999	SG Wattenscheid 09	23	(3)
1999–2001	Lokomotiv Sofia	?	(?)
2002–2003	Botev Plovdiv	4	(0)
- * Club domestic league appearances and goals

Iliyan Simeonov (born 12 January 1974) is a retired Bulgarian footballer who played as a forward.
