= PFC Vihar Gorublyane =

Bulgarian football club

Club crest

PFC Vihar (ПФК Вихър Горубляне) is a Bulgarian football club from Gorublyane, currently playing in the Bulgarian B Professional Football Group, the second division of Bulgarian football. After merged with PFC Akademik (Sofia) in May 2007 which new team called PFC Akademik 1947 (Sofia). And PFC Vihar Gorublyane will play at A OFG-Sofia-grad while PFC Akademik (Sofia) will play at B PFG during season 2007-08
