= Vladimir Yonkov =

Bulgarian footballer

Personal information
- Full name: Vladimir Tsankov Yonkov
- Date of birth: 19 July 1973 (age 53)
- Place of birth: Pleven, Bulgaria
- Height: 1.86 m (6 ft 1 in)
- Position: Defensive midfielder

Senior career*
| Years | Team | Apps | (Gls) |
| 1991–1993 | Yantra Gabrovo | 21 | (1) |
| 1993–1995 | Slavia Sofia | 48 | (0) |
| 1995–1998 | Levski Sofia | 93 | (14) |
| 1999 | Lokomotiv Sofia | 10 | (0) |
| 1999 | Greuther Fürth | 10 | (0) |
| 2000–2001 | Lokomotiv Sofia | 24 | (2) |
| 2001–2002 | Marek Dupnitsa | 25 | (2) |
| 2003 | Septemvri Sofia | 24 | (4) |
| 2003–2005 | Vihar Gorublyane | 37 | (6) |
| 2005–2006 | Kaliakra Kavarna | 25 | (1) |
| 2007 | Spartak Pleven | 11 | (0) |
| 2007–2008 | Akademik Sofia | 24 | (1) |
| 2008–2009 | Hebar Pazardzhik | | |
| Total | | 353 | (27) |

International career
| 1995–1999 | Bulgaria | 4 | (0) |
- * Club domestic league appearances and goals

Vladimir Tsankov Yonkov (Bulgarian: Владимир Цанков Йонков) (born 19 July 1973 in Pleven) is a Bulgarian retired football defensive midfielder.

== Club Playing Honours ==
Levski Sofia

- A PFG: runner-up 1995–96, 1997–98
- Bulgarian Cup: 1998
