= Georgi Borisov =

Bulgarian professional footballer

Georgi Borisov Георги Борисов
Personal information
- Date of birth: 21 October 1974 (age 52)
- Place of birth: Birimirtsi, Bulgaria
- Position: Winger

Senior career*
Years	Team	Apps	(Gls)
1991–1997	Lokomotiv Sofia	126	(22)
1997–1998	Levski Sofia	30	(2)
1999–2000	Lokomotiv Sofia	23	(3)
2000	Bnei Sakhnin		
2001–2003	Hapoel Ramat Gan		
2003–2004	Lokomotiv Sofia	4	(0)
2004–2005	Dorostol Silistra		
2005	Balkan Botevgrad		
2006	Minyor Pernik	6	(1)

International career
1991–1992	Bulgaria U18		
1993–1995	Bulgaria U21	7	(1)
1995	Bulgaria	1	(0)
- * Club domestic league appearances and goals

Georgi Borisov (Bulgarian: Георги Борисов; born 21 October 1974) is a Bulgarian former professional footballer who has also worked as manager.

== Career ==
=== Club career ===
Borisov came through the youth system of Loko Sofia and made his A PFG debut on 25 April 1991, in the railwaymen's 3:0 home win over Chernomorets Burgas, impressing with his performance. In the summer of 1997, he was signed by Levski Sofia on the insistence of coach Stefan Grozdanov and manager & player's agent Andrey Zhelyazkov. Notable highlights during his stay with the "bluemen" included a strong performance in the 1998 Bulgarian Cup Final against archrivals CSKA Sofia, which Levski Sofia won by a score of 5:0, as well as the netting of three goals in the 8:1 rout against Belarusian side Lokomotiv-96 Vitebsk on 13 August 1998 (the second largest margin of victory in European club tournaments for the team) in a UEFA Cup Winners' Cup match. He is one of the few Levski Sofia players (alongside legend Nikola Kotkov) to score a hat-trick for the team in European competitions.

However, shortly after that he returned to Loko Sofia and his career began to stagnate, with the footballer never reaching his previous heights. Borisov subsequently had a stint in Israel (first moving to the country in 2000) with Bnei Sakhnin and Hapoel Ramat Gan. He then played for Loko Sofia, Dorostol Silistra, Balkan Botevgrad, and Minyor Pernik before retiring. After the end of his playing career, Borisov studied to become a manager in Dimitar Penev's coaching school between 2007 and 2008, and also took a number of other jobs outside of sports. His current focus is his own private footballing school "Ferion", where he works with the children.

=== International career ===
He made his debut for Bulgaria on 12 April 1995, in the 0:0 away draw with Macedonia in a friendly match.
