= 1998–99 FC Aarau season =

FC Aarau
1998–99 season
- Club president: Ernst Lämmli
- Head-coach: Martin Trümpler until end of September; Alfred Strasser until end of March 1999; Jochen Dries
- Stadium: Stadion Brügglifeld, Aarau
- 1998–99 NLA Qualifying phase: 12th of 12
- Promotion/relegation group NLA/NLB: 4th of 8
- 1998–99 Swiss Cup: Round 5
- Top goalscorer: League: Roumen Ivanov (15); All: Roumen Ivanov (15)

The 1998–99 season was FC Aarau's 96th season in their existence, since their foundation in 1902. It was their seventeenth season in the top flight of Swiss football, following their promotion at the end of 1980–81 season. FCA played their home games in the Stadion Brügglifeld and the stadium is located on the southern outskirts of Aarau, in the territory of the neighboring municipality of Suhr. It is about one and a half kilometers from Aarau city center and the railway station.

== Overview ==
The local businessman and architect Ernst Lämmli was the club's chairman and patron at this time. He held this position since the AGM in 1989. In advance of the new season, Lämmli extended the contract with Martin Trümpler as head-coach and thus it was to be his fourth season in this position with the club.

The FCA first team competed in this season's domestic first-tier 1998–99 Nationalliga A with the clear intention of reaching the championship group and to qualify for the European competitions. To achieve this would mean they would have to finish the qualifying stage under the top eight teams. The team also competed in the 1998–99 Swiss Cup. The FCA team had ended the previous league season in seventh position and so had not qualified for the UEFA European competitions and they did not enter the Intertoto Cup.

However, the season did not commence sportingly very successfully. After the first eleven rounds, the team were struggling deep in the lower segment of the league table. Lämmli started exercising pressure on head-coach Trümpler. At the end of September, following a home defeat against Servette Lämmli dismissed Trümpler and for the next match installed Alfred Strasser as coach ad-interim. Despite this measure the team remained in the relegation zone and in spring they had to compete in the promotion/relegation group. Following two league defeats and their elimination from the Swiss Cup, Strasser had to leave as well. Lämmli then appointed the German Jochen Dries as new head-coach. Dries had spent the previous twenty years coaching second and third-tier clubs in Switzerland.

== Players ==
The following is the list of the FCA first team squad this season. It also includes players that were in the squad the day the domestic league season started, on 18 July 1998, but subsequently left the club after that date.

Note: Flags indicate national team as defined under FIFA eligibility rules; some limited exceptions apply. Players may hold more than one non-FIFA nationality.

No.	Pos.	Nation	Player
—	GK	SUI	Ivan Benito (league games: 31)
—	GK	SUI	Dino Roselli (league games: 10)
—	GK	SUI	Giosuè Salamina (league games: 0)
—	DF	SUI	David Bader (league games: 33)
—	DF	SUI	Sven Christ (league games: 10)
—	DF	SUI	Mario Eggimann (league games: 6)
—	DF	ITA	Eric Mangia (league games: 5)
—	DF	SUI	Dejan Markovic (league games: 27)
—	DF	SUI	Frédéric Page (league games: 25)
—	DF	CRO	Mirko Pavličević (league games: 34)
—	DF	SUI	Ivan Previtali (league games: 24)
—	DF	SUI	Beat Studer (league games: 19)
—	DF	SUI	Davide Zitola (league games: 9)
—	MF	SUI	Ross Aloisi (league games: 2)

No.	Pos.	Nation	Player
—	MF	ITA	Roberto Baldassari (league games: 32)
—	MF	CZE	Jan Berger (league games: 24)
—	MF	SUI	Marcel Heldmann (league games: 35)
—	MF	POL	Dariusz Skrzypczak (league games: 29)
—	MF	SUI	Gerardo Viceconte (league games: 1)
—	MF	SUI	André Wiederkehr (league games: 3)
—	MF	POL	Sławomir Wojciechowski (league games: 26)
—	FW	BUL	Petar Alexandrov (league games: 30)
—	FW	ITA	Gerardo Donatiello (league games: 2)
—	FW	SUI	Lucio Esposito (league games: 27)
—	FW	BUL	Roumen Ivanov (league games: 35)
—	FW	GHA	Prince Polley (league games: 9)
—	FW	SUI	Remo Tovagliaro (league games: 2)
—	FW	SUI	Carmine Viceconte (league games: 2)
—	FW	EGY	Abdel Sattar Sabry (league games: 7)

Players who left the squad

The following is the list of the FCZ first team players that left the squad during the previous season or in the off-season, before the new domestic season began. Note: Flags indicate national team as defined under FIFA eligibility rules; some limited exceptions apply. Players may hold more than one non-FIFA nationality.

No.	Pos.	Nation	Player
—	GK	SUI	Andreas Hilfiker (to 1. FC Nürnberg)
—	DF	SUI	Bernd Kilian (to FC Wangen bei Olten)
—	MF	SUI	Elvir Melunović (to Servette)
—	MF	NED	Lodewijk Roembiak (to Werder Bremen)

No.	Pos.	Nation	Player
—	FW	MKD	Sasa Ciric (to 1. FC Nürnberg)
—	FW	SUI	Patrick de Napoli (to Grasshopper Club)
—	FW	SUI	Samuel Drakopulos (to Young Boys)
—	FW	LUX	Jeff Saibene (to Locarno)
—	FW	SUI	David Zdrilic (to SSV Ulm)

== Results ==
Legend

Win Draw Loss Postponed

=== Nationalliga A ===
==== Qualification phase ====
The first stage of the NLA began on 18 July 1998 and was completed on 13 December. The top eight teams in the qualification phase would advance to the championship group and the last four teams would play against relegation.

18 July 1998 Round 1	Servette	3–2	Aarau	Charmilles Stadium, Geneva
19:30	Durix 9' (1:0); Juárez (red card) 60' (Roselli) 62' (o.g. 2:2); Wolf 79' (3:2)Rey (yellow card)	FCA summary	23' (1:1) Berger; 59' (pen. 1:2) Ivanov; (yellow card) Markovic	Attendance: 3,389; Referee: (Switzerland) Jürg Herrmann (Hinterkapplen (Wohlen bei Bern))

21 July 1998 Round 2	Aarau	5–0	Basel	Stadion Brügglifeld, Aarau
19:30	Aleksandrov 8' (1:0); Ivanov 21' (2:0); Aleksandrov 51' (3:0); Aleksandrov 65' (4:0); Heldmann 70' (5:0); Zitola (yellow card) 87'	FCB summary FCA summary	(yellow card) 12' Pérez	Attendance: 5,900; Referee: (Switzerland) Reto Rutz (Amriswil)
Note: Aarau fielded their full squad. Basel were without Fabinho, Henry, Frick (all injured), Disseris, Reimann (suspended), Ouattara, Veiga, Abedi (all three not eligible) and Cravero (suspended and not eligible). This was referee Reto Rutz's first top-tier match, good performance.

25 July 1998 Round 3	Xamax	0–0	Aarau	Stade de la Maladière, Neuchâtel
19:30	Gämperle (yellow card)	FCA summary	(yellow card) Ivanov; (yellow card) Studer; (yellow card) Markovic	Attendance: 7,800; Referee: (Switzerland) Dominique Tavel (Lonay)

31 July 1998 Round 4	Aarau	2–6	St. Gallen	Stadion Brügglifeld, Aarau
19:30	Ivanov 49' (pen. 1:2); Skrzypczak 66' (2:5)	FCA summary	17' (0:1) Gil; 19' (0:2) Yakin; 53' (1:3) Gil; 59' (1:4) Vurens; 64' (1:5) Slavchev; 70' (2:6) Contini; (yellow card) Tsawa; (yellow card) Hellinga; (yellow card) Sene; (yellow card) Yakin	Attendance: 4,500; Referee: (Switzerland) Andreas Schluchter (Schönenbuch)

5 August 1998 Round 5	Grasshopper Club	2–0	Aarau	Hardturm, Zürich
19:30	Türkyilmaz 55' (1:0); Vogel 79' (pen.); Türkyilmaz (yellow card)	FCA summary	(yellow card) (yellow-red card) 61' Previtali; (yellow card) Wojciechowski; (yellow card) Zitola	Attendance: 8,800; Referee: (Switzerland) Dieter Schoch (Attiswil)
Note: Match pulled forward from 8 August

16 August 1998 Round 6	Aarau	2–2	Lausanne-Sport	Stadion Brügglifeld, Aarau
14:30	Ivanov 64' (pen- 1:1); Heldmann 79' (2:1)	FCA summary	13' (pen. 0:1) Celestini; 87' (2:2) Thurre; (yellow card) Puce; (yellow card) Londono	Attendance: 2,900; Referee: (Switzerland) Roberto Ferrari

22 August 1998 Round 7	Young Boys	1–1	Aarau	Wankdorf Stadium, Bern
17:30	Bekirovski 26' (1:1); Pintul (yellow card); Baumann (yellow card)	FCA summary	1' (1:0) Ivanov; (yellow card) Ivanov; (yellow card) Heldmann; (yellow card) Previtali	Attendance: 4,250; Referee: (Switzerland) Philippe Leuba (Chexbres)
Note: The first goal fell in under 30 seconds.

29 August 1998 Round 8	Aarau	2–0	Lugano	Stadion Brügglifeld, Aarau
19:30	Berger 28' (1:0); Esposito 76' (2:0); Bader (yellow card)	FCA summary	(yellow card) Fernandez; (yellow card) Giannini	Attendance: 2,600; Referee: (Switzerland) Jürg Herrmann (Hinterkapplen (Wohlen bei Bern))

8 September 1998 Round 9	Sion	3–2	Aarau	Stade Tourbillon, Sion
19:30	Eydelie 40' (1:1); Tholot 58' (2:1); Tholot 67' (3:1); Tholot (yellow card)	FCA summary	29' (0:1) Heldmann; 77' (3:2) Heldmann; (yellow card) Page	Attendance: 5,800; Referee: (Switzerland) Guido Wildhaber (Kerzers)

13 September 1998 Round 10	Luzern	2–2	Aarau	Stadion Allmend, Luzern
16:15	Moser 27' (1:1); Koch 80' (2:2); Moser (yellow card)	FCA summary	26' (0:1) Ivanov; 28' (1:2) Ivanov; (yellow card) Wojciechowski; (yellow card) Studer; (yellow card) Pavličević	Attendance: 4,518; Referee: (Switzerland) Reto Rutz (Amriswil)

20 September 1998 Round 11	Aarau	0–2	Zürich	Stadion Brügglifeld, Aarau
16:15	Aleksandrov (yellow card) 7'; Previtali (yellow card) 45'; Esposito (yellow card) 79'	FCZ summary FCA summary	(yellow card) 17' Bartlett; (yellow card) 24' Nixon; 45' (pen.) Bartlett; (yellow card) 50' Del Signore; 56' (0:2) Sant'Anna	Attendance: 3,700; Referee: (Switzerland) Claude Detruche, (Thônex)

25 September 1998 Round 12	Aarau	1–4	Servette	Stadion Brügglifeld, Aarau
19:30	Ivanov 24' (1:0)	FCA summary	81' (1:1) Pizzinat; 84' (1:2) Bühlmann; 88' (1:3) Varela; 90+2' (1:7) Varela	Attendance: 2,300; Referee: (Liechtenstein) Roland Beck (Triesenberg)

4 October 1998 Round 13	Basel	1–0	Aarau	St. Jakob Stadium, Basel
16:15	Ouattara 50' (1:0); Abedi (yellow card) 69'	FCB summary FCA summary	(yellow card) 55' Markovic	Attendance: 7,300; Referee: (Switzerland) Marcel Vollenweider (Rüti, Zürich)
Note: FCB without Konde, Veiga (both suspended), Henry, Huggel and Reimann (both injured); FCA with a full squad. FCA with new coach Alfred Strasser. The 17-year-old junior international Mario Eggimann made his NLA debut for Aarau. Kreuzer was substituted out at halftime due to back problems. Sahin then played as libero.

18 October 1998 Round 14	Aarau	0–2	Xamax	Stadion Brügglifeld, Aarau
14:30	Bader (yellow card); Studer (yellow card)	FCA summary	16' (0:1) Isabella; 85' (0:2) Zambaz; (yellow card) Zambaz; (yellow card) N'Diaye	Attendance: 2,100; Referee: (Switzerland) René Rogalla (Wallisellen)

25 October 1998 Round 15	St. Gallen	4–3	Aarau	Espenmoos, St. Gallen
14:30	Sène 12' (1:0); Tsawa 63' (2:3) (Skrzypczak) 70' (o.g.); Gil 74' (4:3); Zellweger (yellow card)	FCA summary	27' (1:1) Heldmann; 33' (1:2) Baldassari; 41' (1:3) Baldassari; (yellow card) (yellow-red card) 77' Wojciechowski; (yellow card) Heldmann; (yellow card) Donatiello	Attendance: 8,300; Referee: (Switzerland) Nicolas Daina

30 October 1998 Round 16	Aarau	0–3	Grasshopper Club	Stadion Brügglifeld, Aarau
19:30		FCA summary	23' (0:1) Türkyilmaz; 29' (0:2) Haas; 90+3' Smiljanić; (yellow card) Haas	Attendance: 1.600; Referee: (Liechtenstein) Roland Beck (Triesenberg)
Note: FCA without Wojciechowski (suspended).

8 November 1998 Round 17	Lausanne-Sport	2–1	Aarau	Olympique de la Pontaise, Lausanne
14:30	(Alexandrov) 64' (o.g.); Gerber 70' (2:1); Hänzi (yellow card); Pantelić (yellow card); Celestini (yellow card)	FCA summary	67' (1:1) Alexandrov; (yellow card) Skrzypczak; (yellow card) Markovic	Attendance: 5,250; Referee: (Switzerland) Massimo Busacca (Monte Carasso/Bellinzona)

15 November 1998 Round 18	Aarau	1–1	Young Boys	Stadion Brügglifeld, Aarau
14:30	Bader 17' (1:0); Skrzypczak (yellow card)	FCA summary	34' (1:1) Kehrli; (yellow card) Fryand	Attendance: 1,800; Referee: (Switzerland) Philippe Leuba (Chexbres)

22 November 1998 Round 19	Lugano	0–2	Aarau	Cornaredo, Lugano
14:30	Hürzeler (yellow card); Ncube (yellow card); Rota (yellow card)	FCA summary	62' (0:1) Pavličević; 90+5' (o.g.) (Giannini); (yellow card) Previtali	Attendance: 2,380; Referee: (Switzerland) René Rogalla (Wallisellen)

29 November 1998 Round 20	Aarau	2–2	Sion	Stadion Brügglifeld, Aarau
14:30	Ivanov 17' (pen.); Ivanov 75' (pen. 2:0); Pavličević (yellow card)	FCA summary	78' (pen.) Tholot; 79' (2:2) Tholot; (yellow card) Duruz; (yellow card) Eydelie; (yellow card) Nichetti; (yellow card) La Placa	Attendance: 1,500; Referee: (Switzerland) Marcel Vollenweider (Rüti, Zürich)

6 December 1998 Round 21	Aarau	0–0	Luzern	Stadion Brügglifeld, Aarau
14:30	Markovic (yellow card)	FCA summary	(yellow card) Joller; (yellow card) Brunner	Attendance: 2,400; Referee: (Switzerland) Nicolas Daina

13 December 1998 Round 22	Zürich	1–0	Aarau	Letzigrund, Zürich
14:30	Huber (yellow card) 27'; Bamba 90+2' (1:0)	FCZ summary FCA summary	(yellow card) 39' Pavlicevic; (yellow card) 57' Ivanov	Attendance: 3,200; Referee: (Switzerland) Roberto Ferrari

==== Qualification table ====
Pos	Team	Pld	W	D	L	GF	GA	GD	Pts	Qualification
1	Servette	22	12	8	2	38	24	+14	44	Advance to championship round halved points (rounded up) as bonus
2	Grasshopper Club	22	11	5	6	37	25	+12	38	Advance to championship round halved points (rounded up) as bonus
3	Zürich	22	10	8	4	33	21	+12	38	Advance to championship round halved points (rounded up) as bonus
4	Lausanne-Sport	22	10	8	4	36	33	+3	38	Advance to championship round halved points (rounded up) as bonus
5	Xamax	22	7	11	4	30	23	+7	32	Advance to championship round halved points (rounded up) as bonus
6	Basel	22	8	4	10	21	34	−13	28	Advance to championship round halved points (rounded up) as bonus
7	Luzern	22	6	9	7	26	25	+1	27	Advance to championship round halved points (rounded up) as bonus
8	St. Gallen	22	7	6	9	31	31	0	27	Advance to championship round halved points (rounded up) as bonus
9	Sion	22	5	8	9	22	36	−14	23	Continue to promotion/relegation round
10	Lugano	22	5	7	10	35	43	−8	22	Continue to promotion/relegation round
11	Young Boys	22	4	7	11	33	34	−1	19	Continue to promotion/relegation round
12	Aarau	22	3	7	12	28	41	−13	16	Continue to promotion/relegation round

Source: rsssf.com
Rules for classification: 1) points; 2) goal difference; 3) number of goals scored.

==== Promotion/relegation NLA/NLB ====
The teams in the ninth to twelfth positions in Nationalliga A competed with the top four teams of Nationalliga B in a Nationalliga A/B promotion/relegation round. This phase began on 28 February 1999 and was completed on 2 June.

22 February 1999 Round 1	Yverdon-Sports	2–1	Aarau	Stade Municipal, Yverdon
14:30	Bencivenga 43' (1:1); Enilton 70' (2:1); Peço (yellow card)	FCA summary	13' (0:1) Esposito; (yellow card) Markovic	Attendance: 1,420; Referee: (Switzerland) Andreas Schluchter (Schönenbuch)

7 March 1998 Round 2	Aarau	0–1	Lugano	Stadion Brügglifeld, Aarau
14:30		FCA summary	62' (0:1) Rossi; (yellow card) Fernandez	Attendance: 2,300; Referee: (Switzerland) Marcel Vollenweider (Rüti, Zürich)

14 March 1998 Round 3	Sion	1–1	Aarau	Stade Tourbillon, Sion
14:30	Tholot 79' (1:1); Duruz (yellow card); Biaggi (yellow card); Gigantelli (yellow card); Moret (yellow card); Delgado (yellow card)	FCA summary	64' (0:1) Wojciechowski; (yellow card) Heldmann; (yellow card) Christ	Attendance: 4,500; Referee: (Switzerland) Carlo Bertolini (Vira-Gambarogno)

21 March 1999 Round 4	Aarau	3–1	Wil	Stadion Brügglifeld, Aarau
14:30	Heldmann 26' (1:0); Ivanov 38' (2:0); Alexandrov 74' (3:1); Page (yellow card); Ivanov (yellow card)	FCA summary	50' (2:1) Fabinho	Attendance: 1,500; Referee: (Switzerland) René Rogalla (Wallisellen)

5 April 1999 Round 5	Aarau	1–3	Delémont	Stadion Brügglifeld, Aarau
14:30	Alexandrov (yellow card) (yellow-red card) 79'; Esposito 83' (1:3); Bader (yellow card)	FCA summary	26' (0:1) Froidevaux; 35' (0:2) Kébé; 57' (0:3) Jinani; (yellow card) Romano	Attendance: 3,700; Referee: (Switzerland) Claude Detruche (Thônex)
Note: FCA with new head-coach Jochen Dries on the bench.

11 April 1999 Round 6	Étoile Carouge	3–1	Aarau	Stade de la Fontenette, Carouge
17:30	Costantino 12' (1:0); Mordeku 28' (pen.); Costantino 54' (3:0); Péneveyre (yellow card)	FCA summary	64' (3:1) Heldmann; (yellow card) Heldmann	Attendance: 790; Referee: (Liechtenstein) Roland Beck (Triesenberg)

17 April 1999 Round 7	Aarau	1–1	Young Boys	Stadion Brügglifeld, Aarau
19:30	Alexandrov 68' (1:1); Christ (yellow card); Page (yellow card); Prince Polley (yellow card); Bader (yellow card)	FCA summary	37' (0:1) Sawu; (yellow card) (yellow-red card) 90+2' Lengen; (yellow card) Eich; (yellow card) Smajić; (yellow card) Udovič; (yellow card) Pintul; (yellow card) Del Degan	Attendance: 3,200; Referee: (Switzerland) Nicolas Daina

24 April 1999 Round 8	Young Boys	4–1	Aarau	Wankdorf Stadium, Bern
19:30	Mazzarelli 16' (1:0); Sawu 41' (2:1); Mazzarelli 61' (pen.); Smajic 80' (4:1); Mazzarelli (yellow card); Fryand (yellow card); J. Studer (yellow card)	FCA summary	27' (1:1) Prince Polley; (yellow card) (yellow-red card) 62' Wiederkehr; (yellow card) Page; (yellow card) Bader	Attendance: 4,550; Referee: (Switzerland) Dieter Schoch (Attiswil)

1 May 1999 Round 9	Aarau	3–1	Étoile Carouge	Stadion Brügglifeld, Aarau
19:30	Esposito 12' (1:1); Prince Polley 51' (2:1); Sabry 76' (3:1)	FCA summary	10' (0:1) Vercruysse; (yellow card) Baumann; (yellow card) Vercruysse	Attendance: 1,800; Referee: (Switzerland) Markus Nobs (Wohlen bei Bern)

9 May 1999 Round 10	Delémont	2–1	Aarau	La Blancherie, Delémont
14:30	Ndlovu 15' (1:1); Hoy 34' (2:1); Hoy (yellow card) (yellow-red card) 90+1'; Froidevaux (yellow card)	FCA summary	6' (0:1) Prince Polley; (yellow card) Skrzypczak; (yellow card) Pavličević; (yellow card) Prince Polley; (yellow card) Bader	Attendance: 2,620; Referee: (Switzerland) Roberto Ferrari

16 May 1999 Round 11	Wil	2–3	Aarau	Stadion Bergholz, Wil
14:30	Šlekys 61' (1:1); Fabinho 66' (2:2); Rutz (yellow card); Fuchs (yellow card); Paradiso (yellow card); Rizzo (yellow card)	FCA summary	24' (0:1) Wojciechowski; 62' (1:2) Ivanov; (red card) 70' Wojciechowski; 90+2' (og 2:3) (de Mello Moreira); (yellow card) Studer; (yellow card) Pavličević; (yellow card) Christ	Attendance: 1,600; Referee: (Switzerland) Carlo Bertolini (Vira-Gambarogno)

22 May 1999 Round 12	Aarau	4–1	Sion	Stadion Brügglifeld, Aarau
17:30	Prince Polley 18' (1:0); Sabry 20' (pen. 2:0); Bader 45' (3:1); Esposito 90+2' (4:1); Prince Polley (yellow card)	FCA summary	26' (2:1) Bancarel; (yellow card) (yellow-red card) 41' Duruz; (yellow card) Tum; (yellow card) Biaggi; (yellow card) La Placa	Attendance: 2,100; Referee: (Liechtenstein) Roland Beck (Triesenberg)

29 May 1999 Round 13	Lugano	1–2	Aarau	Cornaredo, Lugano
17:30	Nkufo 36' (1:1); Taborda (yellow card)	FCA summary	10' (0:1) Ivanov; 66' (1:2) Alexandrov; (yellow card) Pavličević; (yellow card) Heldmann	Attendance: 1,600; Referee: (Switzerland) Nicolas Daina

5 June 1999 Round 14	Aarau	2–1	Yverdon-Sports	Stadion Brügglifeld, Aarau
17:30	Ivanov 56' (1:0); Ivanov 60' (2:1); Studer (yellow card) (yellow-red card) 64'	FCA summary	57' (1:1) Fonseca; (yellow card) Magnin; (yellow card) Diogo; (yellow card) Enílton; (yellow card) Jenny	Attendance: 2,800; Referee: (Switzerland) Andreas Schluchter (Schönenbuch)

==== Final table ====
Pos	Team	Pld	W	D	L	GF	GA	GD	Pts	Qualification
1	Lugano	14	9	2	3	19	10	+9	29	Remain in NLA
2	Delémont	14	7	2	5	23	20	+3	23	Promoted to NLA
3	Yverdon-Sport	14	6	3	5	22	17	+5	21	Promoted to NLA
4	Aarau	14	6	2	6	24	24	0	20	Remain in NLA
5	Sion	14	6	1	7	16	17	−1	19	Relegated to NLB
6	Young Boys	14	5	2	7	25	31	−6	17	Relegated to NLB
7	Wil	14	5	1	8	26	30	−4	16	Remain in NLB
8	Étoile Carouge	14	4	3	7	18	24	−6	15	Remain in NLB

Source: RSSSF
Rules for classification: 1) Points; 2) Goal difference; 3) Goals scored; 4) Head-to-head points; 5) Away goals scored; 6) Draw.

=== Swiss Cup ===
The 12 first-tier clubs from the 1998–99 Nationalliga A had been granted byes for the first four rounds and they joined the competition in the fifth round. The first-tier teams were seeded and cound not be drawn against each other. The draw respected regionalities, when possible, and the lower classed team was granted home advantage.

21 February 1999 Round 5	Wil	P–P	Aarau	Stadion Bergholz, Wil
		FCA summary

18 March 1999 Round 5	Wil	3–0	Aarau	Stadion Bergholz, Wil
	Fabinho; Amoah 90' (2:0); Amoah 90+2' (3:0)	FCA summary		Attendance: 1,250; Referee: (Switzerland) Markus Nobs (Wohlen bei Bern)

Lausanne-Sport won the cup and this was their 9th cup title to this date and their second in a row.

== Sources ==
- Switzerland 1998–99 at RSSSF
- FCA squad 1998–99 at arowa.ch

Preceded by 1997–98	FC Aarau seasons	Succeeded by 1999–2000
