= 1999–2000 FC Aarau season =

FC Aarau
1999–2000 season
- Club president: Ernst Lämmli
- Head-coach: Jochen Dries until mid-May and from then Rolf Fringer
- Stadium: Stadion Brügglifeld, Aarau
- 1999–2000 NLA Qualifying phase: 10th of 12
- Promotion/relegation group NLA/NLB: 3rd of 8
- 1999–2000 Swiss Cup: Round 6
- Top goalscorer: League: Rumen Ivanov (20); All: Rumen Ivanov (22)

The 1999–2000 season was FC Aarau's 97th season in their existence, since their foundation in 1902. It was their eighteenth season in the top flight of Swiss football, following their promotion at the end of 1980–81 season. FCA played their home games in the Stadion Brügglifeld and the stadium is located on the southern outskirts of Aarau, in the territory of the neighboring municipality of Suhr. It is about one and a half kilometers from Aarau city center and the railway station.

== Overview ==
Since the AGM in 1989 the local businessman Ernst Lämmli was the club's chairman and patron. Lämmli was an architect and ran his own architectural firm. Toward the end of the previous season Lämmli had installed the German Jochen Dries as head-coach and in advance of the new season Lämmli extended the contract with Dries.

The FCA first team competed in this season's domestic first-tier 1999–2000 Nationalliga A with the clear intention of reaching the championship group and to attempt to qualify for the European competitions. To achieve this would mean they would have to finish the qualifying stage under the top eight teams, which had failed in the previous season. The team also competed in the 1999–2000 Swiss Cup. The FCA team had not qualified for the UEFA European competitions and they did not enter the Intertoto Cup.

FCA did not achieve the championship round and thus had to compete in the promotion/relegation group NLA/NLB, which did not please FCA club president Ernst Lämmli at all. During April and May president Lämmli and head-coach Jochen Dries had various important discussions, with the consequence that Dries lost his job mid-May as the FCA first team suffered a defeat in the promotion/relegation round against lower class Thun. Just one day later Lämmli appointed Rolf Fringer as new head-coach. Fringer had achieved the championship with the club during the 1992–93 season and had been head-coach of the Swiss national football team during 1996 and 1997.

== Players ==
The following is the list of the FCA first team squad this season. It also includes players that were in the squad the day the domestic league season started, on 18 July 1998, but subsequently left the club after that date.

Note: Flags indicate national team as defined under FIFA eligibility rules; some limited exceptions apply. Players may hold more than one non-FIFA nationality.

No.	Pos.	Nation	Player
1	GK	SUI	Ivan Benito (league games: 36)
18	GK	SUI	Dino Roselli (league games: 0)
2	DF	SUI	Davide Zitola (league games: 0)
3	DF	SUI	Dejan Markovic (league games: 1)
4	DF	CRO	Mirko Pavličević (league games: 34)
5	DF	SUI	Beat Studer (league games: 20)
12	DF	SUI	David Bader (league games: 20)
16	DF	SUI	Ivan Previtali (league games: 21)
17	DF	SUI	Frédéric Page (league games: 30)
23	DF	SUI	Mario Eggimann (league games: 4)
6	MF	SUI	Marcel Heldmann (league games: 35)
7	MF	ITA	Roberto Baldassari (league games: 34)
10	MF	POL	Dariusz Skrzypczak (league games: 29)
15	MF	SUI	André Wiederkehr (league games: 20)
20	MF	SUI	Gerardo Viceconte (league games: 0)

No.	Pos.	Nation	Player
25	MF	FRA	Olivier Baudry (league games: 26)
32	MF	SUI	Daniel Tarone (league games: 26)
—	MF	NED	Lodewijk Roembiak (league games: 11)
—	MF	SUI	Remo Senn (league games: 19)
—	MF	POL	Sławomir Wojciechowski (league games: 22)
11	FW	SUI	Lucio Esposito (league games: 6)
14	FW	BUL	Rumen Ivanov (league games: 34)
21	FW	SUI	Carmine Viceconte (league games: 0)
22	FW	ITA	Gerardo Donatiello (league games: 0)
24	FW	SUI	Jean-Pierre La Placa (league games: 30)
—	FW	BUL	Petar Alexandrov (league games: 9)
—	FW	CGO	Chris Bongo (league games: 4)
—	FW	ESP	Manuel Calvo (league games: 2)
—	FW	SUI	Adrian Kunz (league games: 12)
—	FW	SUI	Remo Tovagliaro (league games: 2)

Players who left the squad

The following is the list of the FCZ first team players that left the squad during the previous season or in the off-season, before the new domestic season began. Note: Flags indicate national team as defined under FIFA eligibility rules; some limited exceptions apply. Players may hold more than one non-FIFA nationality.

No.	Pos.	Nation	Player
—	GK	SUI	Giosuè Salamina (reserves)
—	DF	SUI	Sven Christ (to Lausanne-Sport)
—	DF	ITA	Eric Mangia (reserves)

No.	Pos.	Nation	Player
—	MF	AUS	Ross Aloisi (to Lorient)
—	MF	CZE	Jan Berger (to Bellinzona)
—	FW	GHA	Prince Polley (retired)
—	FW	EGY	Abdel Sattar Sabry (to PAOK)

== Results ==
Legend

Win Draw Loss Postponed

=== Nationalliga A ===
==== Qualification phase ====
The first stage of the NLA began on 7 July 1999 and was completed on 12 December. The top eight teams in the qualification phase would advance to the championship group and the last four teams would play against relegation.

7 July 1999 Round 1	Xamax	1–1	Aarau	Stade de la Maladière, Neuchâtel
19:30	N'Diaye 43' (1:0); Simo (yellow card); Perret (yellow card); Gigon (yellow card)	FCZ summary	64' (1:1) Alexandrov; (yellow card) Esposito; (yellow card) Benito	Attendance: 5,400; Referee: (Switzerland) René Rogalla (Wallisellen)

10 July 1999 Round 2	Aarau	P–P	Yverdon-Sports	Stadion Brügglifeld, Aarau
		FCA summary
Note: Match postponed and rescheduled for three days later.

13 July 1999 Round 2	Aarau	1–1	Yverdon-Sports	Stadion Brügglifeld, Aarau
19:30	Ivanov 70' (pen. 1:1); Page (yellow card); Skrzypczak (yellow card); Bader (yellow card)	FCA summary	27' (0:1) Fonseca; (yellow card) Fonseca; (yellow card) Fasel	Attendance: 3,200; Referee: (Switzerland) Carlo Bertolini (Vira-Gambarogno)
Note: Match for Saturday 10 July was postponed and rescheduled for the Tuesday three days later.

17 July 1999 Round 3	Grasshopper Club	4–0	Aarau	Hardturm, Zürich
19:30	H. Yakin 23' (1:0); Hodel 32' (2:0); H. Yakin 58' (3:0); Cabanas 85' (4:0); Hodel (yellow card)	FCA summary	(yellow card) Ivanov	Attendance: 5,100; Referee: (Switzerland) Dominique Tavel (Lonay)

21 July 1999 Round 4	Aarau	1–0	St. Gallen	Stadion Brügglifeld, Aarau
19:30	Ivanov 69' (1:0); Page (yellow card); Bader (yellow card)	FCA summary	(yellow card) Mazzarelli; (yellow card) Zellweger	Attendance: 5,400; Referee: (Switzerland) Philippe Leuba (Chexbres)

24 July 1999 Round 5	Delémont	4–2	Aarau	La Blancherie, Delémont
17:30	Fabinho 1' (1:0); Fabinho 6' (2:0); Drakopulos 52' (3:2); Ndlovu 85' (4:2); Thommen (yellow card); Doc Bui (yellow card)	FCA summary	36' (2:1) Alexandrov; 41' (2:2) Page; (yellow card) Wiederkehr; (yellow card) Senn; (yellow card) Bader	Attendance: 2,820; Referee: (Switzerland) Andreas Schluchter (Schönenbuch)

1 August 1999 Round 6	Aarau	3–2	Servette	Stadion Brügglifeld, Aarau
16:15	Ivanov 38' (1:0); Baldassarri 60' (2:1); Ivanov 82' (3:1)	FCA summary	58' (1:1) Thurre; 90' (3:2) Varela	Attendance: 2,400; Referee: (Switzerland) Nicole Petignat (Courgenay)
Note: 28th minute, Bader substitued out injured.

7 August 1999 Round 7	Luzern	2–1	Aarau	Stadion Allmend, Luzern
19:30	Gian 53' (1:1); Türkyilmaz 88' (2:1)	FCA summary	25' (0:1) Wojciechowski; (yellow card) (yellow-red card) 41' Baudry; (yellow card) Wojciechowski	Attendance: 12,156; Referee: (Switzerland) Marcel Vollenweider (Rüti, Zürich)

14 August 1999 Round 8	Aarau	1–3	Lausanne-Sport	Stadion Brügglifeld, Aarau
19:30	Ivanov 27' (pen.); Studer (yellow card); Page (yellow card)	FCA summary	52' (1:1) Kuźba; 69' (1:2) Kuźba; 88' (1:3) Rehn; (yellow card) Puce; (yellow card) Karlen; (yellow card) Londono	Attendance: 3,000; Referee: (Switzerland) Reto Rutz (Amriswil)

21 August 1999 Round 9	Zürich	0–1	Aarau	Letzigrund, Zürich
19:30	Giannini (yellow card) 25'; Quentin (yellow card) 45'	FCZ summary FCA summary	10' (0:1) Wiederkehr; (yellow card) 32' (yellow-red card) 76' Tarone; (yellow card) Markovic	Attendance: 4,200; Referee: (Switzerland) Dominique Tavel (Lonay)
Note: FCZ without David Opango (long-term injury).

28 August 1999 Round 10	Lugano	4–1	Aarau	Cornaredo, Lugano
19:30	Akassou 11' (1:0); Bastida 29' (2:0); Bastida 68' (3:1); Hoy 89' (4:1); Hürzeler (yellow card); Akassou (yellow card); O'Brien (yellow card); Fernandez (yellow card)	FCA summary	68' (2:1) Page; (yellow card) Heldmann; (yellow card) Skrzypczak	Attendance: 3,100; Referee: (Switzerland) Andreas Schluchter (Schönenbuch)

11 September 1999 Round 11	Aarau	1–3	Basel	Stadion Brügglifeld, Aarau
19:30	Baldassarri (yellow card) 60'; Wojciechowski 81' (1:2)	FCB summary FCA summary]	8' (0:1) Huggel; (yellow card) 15' Tholot; 71' (0:2) Cantaluppi; 87' (1:3) Savić	Attendance: 5,800; Referee: (Switzerland) Markus Nobs (Wohlen bei Bern)
Note: FCA without Aleksandrov, Bader, Eggimann, and Senn (all injured). FCB without Perez, Fabinho, and Güntensperger (all injured).

18 September 1999 Round 12	Aarau	4–1	Xamax	Stadion Brügglifeld, Aarau
19:30	Ivanov 30' (1:0); Ivanov 49' (2:0); Heldmann 77' (3:1); Wojciechowski 90' (4:1)	FCA summary	51' (2:1) Bieli; (yellow card) (yellow-red card) 61' Gigon; (yellow card) Moret; (yellow card) Wittl	Attendance: 2,100; Referee: (Liechtenstein) Roland Beck (Triesenberg)

26 September 1999 Round 13	Yverdon-Sports	1–1	Aarau	Stade Municipal, Yverdon
16:15	Enílton 72' (1:0); Fasel (yellow card)	FCA summary	77' (1:1) Ivanov; (yellow card) Heldmann; (yellow card) Tarone	Attendance: 3,350; Referee: (Switzerland) Reto Rutz (Amriswil)

3 October 1999 Round 14	Aarau	2–1	Grasshopper Club	Stadion Brügglifeld, Aarau
14:30	Ivanov 59' (1:1); Baudry (yellow card) (yellow-red card) 80'; Tarone 81' (2:1); Benito (yellow card); Wiederkehr (yellow card)	FCA summary	34' (0:1) Ekoku; (yellow card) Haas; (yellow card) Chapuisat; (yellow card) Cabanas	Attendance: 3,700; Referee: (Switzerland) Philippe Leuba (Chexbres)

16 October 1999 Round 15	St. Gallen	4–1	Aarau	Espenmoos, St. Gallen
17:30	(Page) 2' (o.g.); Amoah 5' (2:0); Contini 9' (3:0); Jairo 52' (4:1); Stiel (yellow card); Zwyssig (yellow card); Hellinga (yellow card); Thüler (yellow card)	FCA summary	49' (pen. 3:1) Ivanov; (yellow card) Previtali; (yellow card) Wiederkehr	Attendance: 10,200; Referee: (Switzerland) René Rogalla (Wallisellen)
Note: FCA without Baudry (suspended)

24 October 1999 Round 16	Aarau	4–2	Delémont	Stadion Brügglifeld, Aarau
14:30	(Romano) 30' (o.g.); Wojciechowski 41' (2:2); Pavličević 68' (3:2); Baldassarri 76' (4:2); Pavličević (yellow card)	FCA summary	4' (0:1) Doc Bui; 9' (0:2) Romano; (yellow card) (yellow-red card) 68' Doc Bui; (yellow card) Romano; (yellow card) Hushi; (yellow card) Shereni	Attendance: 3,100; Referee: (Liechtenstein) Roland Beck (Triesenberg)

31 October 1999 Round 17	Servette	1–1	Aarau	Charmilles Stadium, Geneva
19:30	Wolf 67' (1:0); Lonfat (yellow card)	FCA summary	85' (1:1) Wojciechowski; (yellow card) Ivanov; (yellow card) Tarone; (yellow card) Pavličević; (yellow card) Skrzypczak	Attendance: 4,235; Referee: (Switzerland) Andreas Schluchter (Schönenbuch)

7 November 1999 Round 18	Aarau	1–0	Luzern	Stadion Brügglifeld, Aarau
14:30	Heldmann 84' (1:0)	FCA summary	(yellow card) Arnold; (yellow card) Lubamba; (yellow card) Max; (yellow card) Wyss	Attendance: 6,900; Referee: (Switzerland) Dominique Tavel (Lonay)

20 November 1999 Round 19	Lausanne-Sport	3–1	Aarau	Olympique de la Pontaise, Lausanne
17:30	Rehn 8' (1:0); Kuźba 32' (2:0); Kuźba 68' (3:0)	FCA summary	78' (3:1) Wojciechowski	Attendance: 1,500; Referee: (Switzerland) Claude Detruche (Thônex)
Note: Fair game, no yellow cards.

28 November 1999 Round 20	Aarau	1–1	Zürich	Stadion Brügglifeld, Aarau
16:15	Wiederkehr 59' (1:1)	FCZ summary	(yellow card) 42' Eydelie; 55' (0:1) Kavelashvili; (yellow card) 72' Chassot; (yellow card) 82' Fischer	Attendance: 1,800; Referee: (Switzerland) Philippe Leuba (Chexbres)
Note: FCZ without Opango (long-term injury).

5 December 1999 Round 21	Aarau	0–2	Lugano	Stadion Brügglifeld, Aarau
14:30	Ivanov (yellow card)	FCA summary	Giménez 76' (0:1); Bastida 90+3' (0:2); (yellow card) Bullo; (yellow card) Lombardo; (yellow card) Rossi	Attendance: 2,500; Referee: (Switzerland) René Rogalla (Wallisellen)

12 December 1999 Round 22	Basel	2–1	Aarau	Stadion Schützenmatte, Basel
14:30	Cantaluppi 8' (1:0); Knez (yellow card) 60'; Kreuzer 79' (pen. 2:1)	FCB summary FCA summary	21' (1:1) Skrzypczak; (yellow card) 63' Tarone; (red card) 78' Studer; (yellow card) 82' Baudry; (yellow card) 90+2' Pavličević	Attendance: 6,900; Referee: (Switzerland) Carlo Bertolini (Vira-Gambarogno)
Note: FCB without Ceccaroni, Tholot, and Fabinho (all injured). FCA without Wiederkehr, Aleksandrov, Bader, and Traoré (all injured), as well as Ivanov (suspended). Gale-force winds throughout the entire match.

==== Qualification table ====
Pos	Team	Pld	W	D	L	GF	GA	GD	Pts	Qualification
1	St. Gallen	22	13	6	3	42	25	+17	45	Advance to championship round halved points (rounded up) as bonus
2	Basel	22	9	10	3	31	21	+10	37	Advance to championship round halved points (rounded up) as bonus
3	Lausanne-Sport	22	9	9	4	35	25	+10	36	Advance to championship round halved points (rounded up) as bonus
4	Grasshopper Club	22	9	7	6	40	25	+15	34	Advance to championship round halved points (rounded up) as bonus
5	Yverdon-Sports	22	7	9	6	28	25	+3	30	Advance to championship round halved points (rounded up) as bonus
6	Xamax	22	7	7	8	34	33	+1	28	Advance to championship round halved points (rounded up) as bonus
7	Luzern	22	8	4	10	28	29	−1	28	Advance to championship round halved points (rounded up) as bonus
8	Servette	22	8	4	10	32	36	−4	28	Advance to championship round halved points (rounded up) as bonus
9	Zürich	22	6	8	8	21	29	−8	26	Continue to promotion/relegation round
10	Aarau	22	7	5	10	30	42	−12	26	Continue to promotion/relegation round
11	Lugano	22	5	6	11	27	34	−7	21	Continue to promotion/relegation round
12	SR Delémont	22	4	5	13	24	48	−24	17	Continue to promotion/relegation round

Source: rsssf.com

==== Promotion/relegation group NLA/NLB ====
The teams in the ninth to twelfth positions in Nationalliga A competed with the top four teams of Nationalliga B in a Nationalliga A/B promotion/relegation round. This phase began on 12 March 2000 and was completed on 7 June.

12 March 2000 Round 1	Aarau	0–0	Zürich	Stadion Brügglifeld, Aarau
14:30	Tarone (yellow card) 32'; Roembiak (yellow card) 39'; Skrzypczak (yellow card) 53'; Heldmann (yellow card)	FCZ summary		Attendance: 4,200; Referee: (Switzerland) Philippe Leuba (Chexbres)
Note: FCZ without Opango (long-term injury). FCA without Studer (suspended).

19 March 2000 Round 2	Sion	2–0	Aarau	Stade Tourbillon, Sion
14:30	Renou 57' (1:0); Enílton 72' (2:0)	FCA summary	(red card) 26' Roembiak	Attendance: 4,400; Referee: (Switzerland) Markus Nobs (Wohlen bei Bern)

26 March 2000 Round 3	Aarau	2–0	Baden	Stadion Brügglifeld, Aarau
14:30	La Placa 41' (1:0); Pavličević 62' (2:0)	FCA summary		Attendance: 4,500; Referee: (Switzerland) Marcel Vollenweider (Rüti, Zürich)
Note: FCA without Roembiak (suspended). Fair game, no cautions.

2 April 2000 Round 4	Lugano	3–2	Aarau	Cornaredo, Lugano
14:30	Rossi 14' (1:0); Bullo 33' (2:0); Bastida 76' (3:2); Rothenbühler (yellow card); Moresi (yellow card); Thoma (yellow card)	FCA summary	70' (2:1) Heldmann; 73' (2:2) Previtali; (yellow card) Eggimann; (yellow card) Previtali; (yellow card) Pavličević; (yellow card) Studer	Attendance: 2,850; Referee: (Switzerland) René Rogalla (Wallisellen)

9 April 2000 Round 5	Bellinzona	2–2	Aarau	Stadio Comunale, Bellinzona
14:30	Martin (red card) 17'; Cavin 39' (1:2); Türkyilmaz 76' (2:2)	FCA summary	30' (0:1) Tarone; 37' (0:2) Senn; (yellow card) Tarone; (yellow card) Bader	Attendance: 3,900; Referee: (Switzerland) Philippe Leuba (Chexbres)

16 April 2000 Round 6	Aarau	2–0	Thun	Stadion Brügglifeld, Aarau
14:30	Heldmann 1' (1:0); Baldassarri 52' (2:0)	FCA summary	(yellow card) Moser	Attendance: 3,100; Referee: (Switzerland) Carlo Bertolini (Vira-Gambarogno)

20 April 2000 Round 7	Aarau	5–2	Delémont	Stadion Brügglifeld, Aarau
19:30	Ivanov 2' (1:0); Ivanov 10' (2:0); Pavličević 34' (3:1); Ivanov 56' (4:1); Baldassarri 63' (5:1)	FCA summary	16' (2:1) Kloetzli; (yellow card) (yellow-red card) 45+1' Kloetzli; 73' (pen. 5:2) Romano	Attendance: 3,600; Referee: (Switzerland) Dominique Tavel (Lonay)

29 April 2000 Round 8	Delémont	0–1	Aarau	La Blancherie, Delémont
19:30	Romano (yellow card); Vernier (yellow card); Izzo (yellow card)	FCA summary	33' (0:1) Heldmann; (yellow card) Tarone	Attendance: 2,450; Referee: (Liechtenstein) Roland Beck (Triesenberg)
Note: SRD without Kloetzli (suspended).

6 May 2000 Round 9	Thun	1–0	Aarau	Stadion Lachen, Thun
17:30	Stettler 76' (1:0); Schneider (yellow card)	FCA summary	(yellow card) Previtali; (yellow card) Tarone	Attendance: 1,650; Referee: (Switzerland) Dieter Schoch (Attiswil)
Note: After this match, FCA club president Ernst Lämmli and head-coach Jochen Dries had various important discussions, with the consequence that Dries lost his job.

13 May 2000 Round 10	Aarau	1–1	Bellinzona	Stadion Brügglifeld, Aarau
19:30	Ivanov 13' (1:0)	FCA summary	39' (1:1) Türkyilmaz; (yellow card) Bugnard; (yellow card) Türkyilmaz	Attendance: 3,600; Referee: (Switzerland) Markus Nobs (Wohlen bei Bern)
Note: FCA for the first time with new head-coach Rolf Fringer on the side-lines.

20 May 2000 Round 11	Aarau	2–2	Lugano	Stadion Brügglifeld, Aarau
19:30	Ivanov 7' (1:0); Ivanov 78' (2:2); Page (yellow card); Kunz (yellow card)	FCA summary	9' (1:1) Magnin; 14' (1:2) Magnin; (yellow card) Razzetti; (yellow card) Bullo	Attendance: 3,200; Referee: (Austria) Manfred Schüttengruber
Note: The match was part of the interaction referee exchange between the Swiss Football Association and the Austrian Football Association.

27 May 2000 Round 12	Baden	1–3	Aarau	Esp Stadium, Fislisbach
17:30	Silva 33' (1:0); Mehmeti (yellow card); Lüthi (yellow card); Stilz (yellow card)	FCA summary	34' (1:1) Ivanov; 44' (1:2) Ivanov; 48' (1:3) Ivanov; (yellow card) Heldmann	Attendance: 3,200; Referee: (Switzerland) Dominique Tavel (Lonay)

4 June 2000 Round 13	Aarau	3–1	Sion	Stadion Brügglifeld, Aarau
16:15	Ivanov 12' (1:0); Skrzypczak 46' (2:0); La Placa 61' (3:0); Pavličević (yellow card); Baldassarri (yellow card)	FCA summary	Grichting 90+4' (3:1); (yellow card) Deumi	Attendance: 3,500; Referee: (Switzerland) Philippe Leuba (Chexbres)

7 June 2000 Round 14	Zürich	1–0	Aarau	Letzigrund, Zürich
19:30	Del Signore (yellow card) 44'; Đorđević (yellow card) 54'; Del Signore 59' (1:0); Kavelashvili (yellow card) 65'	FCZ summary	(yellow card) 37' Skrzypczak	Attendance: 16,500; Referee: (Switzerland) Dieter Schoch (Attiswil)
Note: Free admission for over 3,500 visitors.

==== Final table ====
Pos	Team	Pld	W	D	L	GF	GA	GD	Pts	Promotion or relegation
1	Lugano	14	8	4	2	26	18	+8	28	Remain in NLA
2	Sion (P)	14	7	3	4	28	19	+9	24	Promoted to NLA
3	Zürich	14	7	3	4	17	12	+5	24	Remain in NLA
4	Aarau	14	6	4	4	23	16	+7	22	Remain in NLA
5	Bellinzona	14	4	8	2	21	14	+7	20	Remain in NLB
6	Thun	14	4	4	6	17	18	−1	16	Remain in NLB
7	Delémont (R)	14	4	2	8	18	29	−11	14	Relegated to NLB
8	Baden	14	1	2	11	7	31	−24	5	Remain in NLB

Source: rsssf.com
Rules for classification: 1) points; 2) goal difference; 3) number of goals scored.
(P) Promoted; (R) Relegated

=== Swiss Cup ===
The 1999–2000 Swiss Cup was the 75th season of Switzerland's annual football cup competition. It began on 7 August with the first games of Round 1 and ended on 28 May 2000 with the Final held at Wankdorf, Bern. The Cup winners earned a place in the first round of the UEFA Cup. The 12 first-tier clubs from the 1999–2000 Nationalliga A had been granted byes for the first four rounds and they joined the competition in the fifth round. The first-tier teams in round 5 were seeded and cound not be drawn against each other. The draw respected regionalities, when possible, and the lower classed team was granted home advantage.

14 November 1999 Round 5	Winterthur	1–3	Aarau	Schützenwiese, Winterthur
	Firat 43' (1:2)	FCA summary	20' (0:1) Skrzypczak; 41' (0:2) Ivanov; 90+1' (1:3) Skrzypczak	Attendance: 1,640; Referee: (Switzerland) Mouidi (Courgenay)

5 March 2000 Round 6	Aarau	1–3	Servette	Stadion Brügglifeld, Aarau
	Ivanov 14' (pen.)	FCA summary Servette summary	43' (1:1) Melunovic; 70' (1:2) Pizzinat; 82' (1:3) Thurre	Attendance: 3,000; Referee: (Switzerland) Guido Wildhaber (Kerzers)

FCZ won the cup and this was Zürich's sixth cup title to this date.

== Sources ==
- Switzerland 1999–2000 at RSSSF
- FCA squad 1999–2000 at arowa.ch

Preceded by 1998–99	FC Aarau seasons	Succeeded by 2000–01
