= 1995 Bulgarian Cup final =

- Event: 1994–95 Bulgarian Cup
Botev Plovdiv	Lokomotiv Sofia
A Group	A Group
2	4
- Date: 27 May 1995
- Venue: Vasil Levski Stadium, Sofia
- Referee: Ion Crăciunescu (Romania)
- Attendance: 12,000

The 1995 Bulgarian Cup final was played at the Vasil Levski National Stadium in Sofia on 27 May 1995, and was contested between the sides of Lokomotiv Sofia and Botev Plovdiv. The match was won by Lokomotiv Sofia.

== Match ==
=== Details ===
27 May 1995
18:00 EEST

Botev Plovdiv	2–4	Lokomotiv Sofia
Hvoynev 12'; Sirakov 83'		Donev 28'; Y. Petrov 45'; Marinov 55'; Chilibonov 77'

Vasil Levski National Stadium, Sofia
Attendance: 12,000
Referee: Ion Crăciunescu (Romania)

Botev	Lokomotiv

Botev:
GK	1	(Bulgaria) Borislav Mihaylov
DF	2	(Bulgaria) Radoslav Vidov
DF	3	(Bulgaria) Rumen Dimitrov
DF	4	(Bulgaria) Anton Sivinov
DF	5	(Bulgaria) Georgi Markov
MF	6	(Bulgaria) Ayan Sadakov (yellow card) 20' (substituted off) 61'
MF	7	(Bulgaria) Rumen Ivanov (yellow card) 15'
FW	8	(Bulgaria) Nasko Sirakov (c)
FW	9	(Bulgaria) Boris Hvoynev
FW	10	(Bulgaria) Georgi Donkov
MF	11	(Bulgaria) Kostadin Vidolov
Substitutes:
GK	12	(Bulgaria) Vasil Vasilev
DF	13	(Bulgaria) Dimitar Sirakov
MF	14	(Bulgaria) Rumen Petrov
FW	15	(Bulgaria) Stefan Draganov (substituted in) 61'
MF	16	(Bulgaria) Krasimir Dimitrov
Manager:
(Bulgaria) Pavel Panov

Lokomotiv:
GK	1	(Bulgaria) Rumen Apostolov (substituted off) 90'
DF	2	(Bulgaria) Anton Velkov
MF	3	(Bulgaria) Yavor Valchinov
DF	4	(Bulgaria) Dimitar Vasev (c)
MF	5	(Bulgaria) Yordan Marinov (yellow card) 4'
DF	6	(Bulgaria) Ivo Slavchev (yellow card) 30'
FW	7	(Bulgaria) Doncho Donev (yellow card) 14'
MF	8	(Bulgaria) Hristo Koilov
DF	9	(Federal Republic of Yugoslavia) Ivan Radivojević
MF	10	(Bulgaria) Diyan Petkov (substituted off) 68'
FW	11	(Bulgaria) Yasen Petrov (substituted off) 61'
Substitutes:
GK	12	(Bulgaria) Aleksandar Minovski (substituted in) 90'
DF	13	(Bulgaria) Plamen Mechev
MF	14	(Bulgaria) Simeon Chilibonov (substituted in) 68'
DF	15	(Bulgaria) Valeri Yochev (substituted in) 61'
FW	16	(Bulgaria) Georgi Borisov
Manager:
(Bulgaria) Radoslav Zdravkov

== See also ==
- 1994–95 A Group
