= Razzetti =

Razzetti is a surname. Notable people with the surname include:

- Alberto Razzetti (born 1999), Italian swimmer
- Stefano Razzetti (born 1971), Italian footballer
