= 1994–95 Bulgarian Cup =

Tournament details
- Country: Bulgaria

Final positions
- Champions: Lokomotiv Sofia (4th cup)
- Runners-up: Botev Plovdiv

Tournament statistics
- Top goal scorer(s): Nasko Sirakov (Botev); Svetlin Matuski (Montana) (7 goals each)

The 1994–95 Bulgarian Cup was the 55th season of the Bulgarian Cup. Lokomotiv Sofia won the competition, beating Botev Plovdiv 4–2 in the final at the Vasil Levski National Stadium in Sofia.

== First round ==
Team 1	Agg.	Team 2	1st leg	2nd leg
23 November / 7 December 1994
Rodopa Smolyan (III)	3–6	Provadia (II)	3–3	0–3 (w/o)
Cherno More Varna (II)	3–4	Kremikovtsi (III)	3–3	0–1
Olimpik Galata (III)	4–6	Beroe Stara Zagora (I)	3–0	1–6 (a.e.t.)
Olimpik Tvarditsa (III)	2–5	Dunav Ruse (II)	1–1	1–4
Neftochimic Burgas (I)	2–1	Lokomotiv GO (I)	0–1	2–0 (a.e.t.)
Pirin Gotse Delchev (II)	0–7	Spartak Varna (II)	0–1	0–6
Dzhebel (III)	1–13	CSKA Sofia (I)	0–1	1–12
Chavdar Byala Slatina (III)	4–2	Litex Lovech (I)	3–1	1–1
Akademik Sofia (II)	2–8	Etar Veliko Tarnovo (I)	1–2	1–6
Lokomotiv Sofia (I)	13–0	Akademik Gabrovo (III)	7–0	6–0
Shumen (I)	3–4	Dobrudzha Dobrich (I)	2–3	1–1
Spartak Pleven (II)	2–3	Pirin Blagoevgrad (I)	2–0	0–3
Montana (I)	7–2	Belasitsa Petrich (II)	6–0	1–2
Botev Plovdiv (I)	6–4	Slavia Sofia (I)	4–2	2–2
Lokomotiv Plovdiv (I)	(a)1–1	Spartak Plovdiv (I)	0–0	1–1
Levski Sofia (I)	8–2	Tundzha Yambol (III)	6–0	2–2

== Second round ==
Team 1	Agg.	Team 2	1st leg	2nd leg
15 February / 8 March 1995
Neftochimic Burgas (I)	5–4	Levski Sofia (I)	2–2	3–2
17, 18 February / 8 March 1995
Lokomotiv Plovdiv (I)	4–7	Botev Plovdiv (I)	3–5	1–2
Pirin Blagoevgrad (I)	1–2	Montana (I)	0–1	1–1
Chavdar Byala Slatina (III)	2–2 (a)	Beroe Stara Zagora (I)	2–1	0–1
Provadia (II)	0–2	Etar Veliko Tarnovo (I)	0–0	0–2
22 February / 8 March 1995
Kremikovtsi (III)	1–3	Spartak Varna (II)	0–2	1–1
1 / 8 March 1995
CSKA Sofia (I)	4–1	Dobrudzha Dobrich (I)	3–1	1–0
Dunav Ruse (II)	0–1	Lokomotiv Sofia (I)	0–1	0–0

== Quarter-finals ==
Team 1	Agg.	Team 2	1st leg	2nd leg
5 April / 3 May 1995
Montana (I)	6–2	Beroe Stara Zagora (I)	5–0	1–2
Etar Veliko Tarnovo (I)	1–4	Botev Plovdiv (I)	0–0	1–4
Spartak Varna (II)	0–8	Neftochimic Burgas (I)	0–6	0–2
Lokomotiv Sofia (I)	2–1	CSKA Sofia (I)	1–0	1–1

== Semi-finals ==
Team 1	Agg.	Team 2	1st leg	2nd leg
10 / 17 May 1995
Neftochimic Burgas (I)	1–2	Lokomotiv Sofia (I)	0–1	1–1 (a.e.t.)
Montana (I)	4–11	Botev Plovdiv (I)	2–5	2–6

== Final ==
=== Details ===
27 May 1995
18:00 EEST

Botev Plovdiv	2–4	Lokomotiv Sofia
Hvoynev 12'; Sirakov 83'		Donev 28'; Y. Petrov 45'; Marinov 55'; Chilibonov 77'

Vasil Levski National Stadium, Sofia
Attendance: 12,000
Referee: Ion Crăciunescu (Romania)

Botev	Lokomotiv
