= Murat Ural =

Swiss footballer (born 1987)

Personal information
- Date of birth: 5 July 1987 (age 39)
- Place of birth: Switzerland
- Height: 1.84 m (6 ft 0 in)
- Position: Striker

Youth career
- –2005: Winterthur
- 2005–2006: Grasshoppers

Senior career*
Years	Team	Apps	(Gls)
2006–2011	St. Gallen		
2008	→ Vaduz (loan)	8	(1)
2009	→ Servette (loan)		
2009–2010	→ Gossau (loan)		
2011	→ Winterthur (loan)		
2011–2012	Winterthur		
2012	→ Schaffhausen (loan)		
2012–2013	Schaffhausen		
2013–2014	Bulle		
2014–2015	Düdingen		

Managerial career
- 2017–2022: Winterthur II
- 2024: Zürich (caretaker)
- 2024: VfL Bochum (caretaker)
- * Club domestic league appearances and goals

Murat Ural (born 5 July 1987) is a Swiss retired football player and manager of Turkish descent.

== Career ==
Ural began his career with the Grasshoppers. After one year, he joined the junior team of the St. Gallen where he stayed for two years. In July 2008, he was lent to the Vaduz. There, he stayed and played from early 2009 on, and then returned to St. Gallen. His club lent him again to Servette; there, he played between 30 June 2009 and 1 July 2009, before turning back to St. Gallen. On 1 October 2009, Gossau signed the forward on loan from St. Gallen until the end of the season.

== Managerial career ==
On 13 February 2024, he was appointed as interim co-trainer of Zürich, alongside Umberto Romano, following Bo Henriksen's sudden departure. The two of them were dismissed from their positions on 22 April 2024, as the team had slipped from third to sixth position in the table. He moved to VfL Bochum and took over the interim head coaching role in October 2024, before being replaced two weeks later.
