= Beat Fehr =

Swiss racing driver

- Nationality: Swiss
- Born: 21 June 1943 Wallisellen, Switzerland
- Died: 18 June 1967 (aged 23) Caserta, Italy

Formula 3
- Years active: 1963–1967

Claude Beat Fehr (21 June 1943 – 18 June 1967) was a Swiss racing driver.

== Biography ==
Fehr was born in Wallisellen. He started racing in 1963, and raced several marques, including Alfa Romeo, Cooper, and De Tomaso, before buying a Brabham from fellow driver Jürg Dubler.

Fehr was killed in an Italian Formula Three race at Caserta, the XVIII Coppa d'Oro Pasquale Amato, the same race that claimed the lives of "Geki" Russo and Giuseppe "Tiger" Perdomi. Fehr collided with the similar Brabham of Andrea Saltari and although neither driver was hurt, Fehr's car was left blocking the track. The next driver, Franco Foresti, skidded on oil from the accident and crashed, prompting Fehr to get out of his car and run down the track to warn oncoming drivers.

The next car along was the Matra of "Geki" Russo, who crashed into the wrecked cars lying on the track, before striking a concrete wall. Russo was thrown out of his car and died immediately. The exact details are not clear, but Fehr was either struck by Russo, or by one of the next group of drivers to arrive at the scene. Corrado Manfredini, "Tiger" Perdomi, Massimo Natili, Manfred Mohr and Jürg Dubler, among others, all crashed at the same point. Perdomi was trapped in his car for some time before rescue teams arrived, and he was eventually extricated by his own pit crew. He died in hospital eight days later.

Fehr was posthumously awarded with a Letter of Congratulations from the International Fairplay Committee for his actions.
