= Paolo Gigantelli =

Swiss footballer (born 1979)

Personal information
- Date of birth: 20 June 1979 (age 47)
- Height: 1.78 m (5 ft 10 in)
- Position: Midfielder

Senior career*
Years	Team	Apps	(Gls)
1998–1999	FC Sion		
1999–2000	AC Bellinzona		
2000–2001	FC Locarno		
2001–2004	AC Bellinzona		
2005–2008	FC Locarno		
- * Club domestic league appearances and goals

Paolo Gigantelli (born 20 June 1979) is a retired Swiss football midfielder.
