= Vasil Vasilev (footballer, born 1976) =

Bulgarian footballer

Personal information
- Full name: Vasil Parvanov Vasilev
- Date of birth: 15 July 1976 (age 50)
- Place of birth: Bulgaria
- Height: 1.80 m (5 ft 11 in)
- Position: Goalkeeper

Team information
- Current team: Hebar Pazardzhik (Goalkeeper Coach)

Senior career*
Years	Team	Apps	(Gls)
2000–2001	Hebar Pazardzhik	23	(0)
2001–2002	Belasitsa Petrich		
2002–2003	Hebar Pazardzhik		
2003–2006	Rodopa Smolyan	60	(0)
2006–2007	Vidima-Rakovski	5	(0)
2007–2008	Spartak Plovdiv	15	(0)
2008	Akademik Sofia	11	(0)
2009	Marek Dupnitsa	13	(0)
2009–2010	Akademik Sofia	16	(0)
2010–2011	Malesh Mikrevo		
- * Club domestic league appearances and goals as of 1 August 2010

Vasil Vasilev (Bulgarian: Васил Василев; born 15 July 1976) is a Bulgarian former football goalkeeper.

Vasilev previously played for Rodopa Smolyan in the A PFG.
