= Hoang Doc Bui =

Swiss footballer (born 1972)

Personal information
- Date of birth: 11 May 1972 (age 54)
- Height: 1.70 m (5 ft 7 in)
- Position: Midfielder

Senior career*
Years	Team	Apps	(Gls)
1989–1990	FC Bassecourt		
1990–1993	Neuchâtel Xamax		
1993–1994	FC Bulle		
1994–2004	SR Delémont		
1998	→ FC Sion (loan)		
2004–2009	FC Bassecourt		
- * Club domestic league appearances and goals

Hoang Doc Bui (born 11 May 1972) is a Swiss retired footballer who played as a midfielder.
