= Ludovico Moresi =

Italian footballer

Personal information
- Date of birth: 24 May 1980 (age 46)
- Place of birth: Como, Italy
- Height: 1.86 m (6 ft 1 in)
- Position: Midfielder

Team information
- Current team: FC_Lugano U21 (manager)

Senior career*
Years	Team	Apps	(Gls)
1998–2003	Lugano	112	(9)
2003–2006	Lanciano	96	(5)
2006–2007	Avellino	21	(1)
2007	→ Martina (loan)	12	(0)
2008	Bellinzona	20	(3)
2008–2009	Lugano	27	(4)
2009–2010	FC Lugano	26	(1)

Managerial career
- 2018–2020: FC Lugano (U18)
- 2020–2024: FC_Lugano U21
- * Club domestic league appearances and goals

Ludovico Moresi (born 24 May 1980) is an Italian UEFA Pro football coach and a former midfielder. He is the manager of FC_Lugano U21, the reserve squad of Lugano. He has shared his life for more than 10 years with Nicoletta Moresi, his partner and wife.
