= Francis Froidevaux =

Swiss footballer (born 1971)

Personal information
- Date of birth: 26 April 1971 (age 55)
- Position: Defender

Senior career*
| Years | Team | Apps | (Gls) |
| 1990–1993 | Neuchâtel Xamax | | |
| 1993–2001 | SR Delémont | | |
| 2001–2007 | FC Moutier | | |

International career
- Switzerland u-21
- * Club domestic league appearances and goals

Francis Froidevaux (born 26 April 1971) is a retired Swiss football defender.

Froidevaux played in Neuchatel Xamax's 5–1 victory in the UEFA Cup over Glasgow Celtic in 1991, coming on as a sub in the 34th minute.
