= Yordan Marinov =

Bulgarian footballer

Personal information
- Full name: Yordan Marinov Georgiev
- Date of birth: 23 June 1968 (age 58)
- Place of birth: Bulgaria
- Position: Midfielder

Senior career*
Years	Team	Apps	(Gls)
1986–1989	Akademik Svishtov	30	(2)
1989–1991	Lokomotiv GO	53	(7)
1991–1992	CSKA Sofia	13	(0)
1992	→ Slavia Sofia (loan)	1	(0)
1992–1993	Slavia Sofia	21	(2)
1993–1994	Lokomotiv Plovdiv	39	(3)
1995–1997	Lokomotiv Sofia	65	(12)
1997–1999	Levski Sofia	28	(1)
1999	FC Kremikovtsi		
2000	Akademik Svishtov		
2000–2001	Hebar Pazardzhik	26	(1)
2001–2002	Belasitsa Petrich		
- * Club domestic league appearances and goals

Yordan Marinov (born 23 June 1968) is a former Bulgarian football player as a midfielder. During his career, he played for a number of teams in the A Group. He was the first player to wear the jerseys of all four major capital clubs – CSKA, Slavia, Lokomotiv, and Levski. He is also known as 'The Grand Slam.' He is the brother of Evgeni Marinov, also a former football player. He is the father of footballer Liliyan Marinov.

== Honours ==
Cska Sofia

- Champion of Bulgaria 1991-1992

Lokomotiv Sofia

- Bulgarian Cup: 1994–95

Levski Sofia

- Bulgarian Cup: 1997–98

== Career ==
Originally from Svishtov, Marinov is a youth player of the local Akademik. During his career, he became the Champion of Bulgaria in 1992 with CSKA (Sofia) and won the Bulgarian Cup twice – in 1995 with Lokomotiv (Sofia) and in 1998 with Levski. He was the vice-champion with Lokomotiv (Sofia) in 1995 and with Levski (Sofia) in 1998 and 1999. He is a bronze medalist with Lokomotiv (Sofia) in 1996. He played over 250 matches in the A group.
