= Alfred Strasser =

Swiss footballer (born 1954)

Personal information
- Date of birth: 8 February 1954 (age 72)
- Position: Defender

Senior career*
Years	Team	Apps	(Gls)
1974	FC Zürich		
1975–1982	FC Wettingen		

Managerial career
- 1988: FC Wettingen
- 1990–1991: FC Wettingen
- 1991–1992: FC Aarau
- 1998–1999: FC Aarau
- 2010: FC Aarau
- * Club domestic league appearances and goals

Alfred Strasser (born 8 February 1954) is a retired Swiss football defender and later manager.
