= Éric Taborda =

French footballer (born 1969)

Personal information
- Date of birth: 14 January 1969 (age 57)
- Place of birth: Lyon, France
- Height: 1.78 m (5 ft 10 in)
- Position: Defender

Senior career*
Years	Team	Apps	(Gls)
1986–1991	Lyon		
1991–1992	US Orléans		
1992–1993	RC Ancenis		
1993–1996	FC Mulhouse		
1996–1998	Toulouse FC		
1998–2000	AC Lugano		
2000	Clydebank	4	(0)
2000–2001	FC Mulhouse		
2001–2003	La Roche VF		
- * Club domestic league appearances and goals

Éric Taborda (born 14 January 1969) is a retired French footballer. A defender, he was active as a professional in France, Switzerland and Scotland.

== Career ==
Born in Lyon, Taborda played for Olympique Lyonnais, US Orléans, RC Ancenis, FC Mulhouse, Toulouse FC, AC Lugano, Clydebank and La Roche VF.
