= Ivan Radivojević =

Serbian footballer

Personal information
- Date of birth: 8 November 1968 (age 57)
- Position: Midfielder

Senior career*
Years	Team	Apps	(Gls)
1986–1990	Napredak Kruševac		
1990	Partizan	1	(0)
1991	Olimpija Ljubljana	10	(0)
1992–1994	Napredak Kruševac	47	(6)
1994–1997	Lokomotiv Sofia	78	(12)
1997–1998	Slavia Sofia	25	(2)
- * Club domestic league appearances and goals

Ivan Radivojević (born 8 November 1968) is a Serbian retired football midfielder.
