= Adrian Naef =

Swiss writer and musician (born 1948)

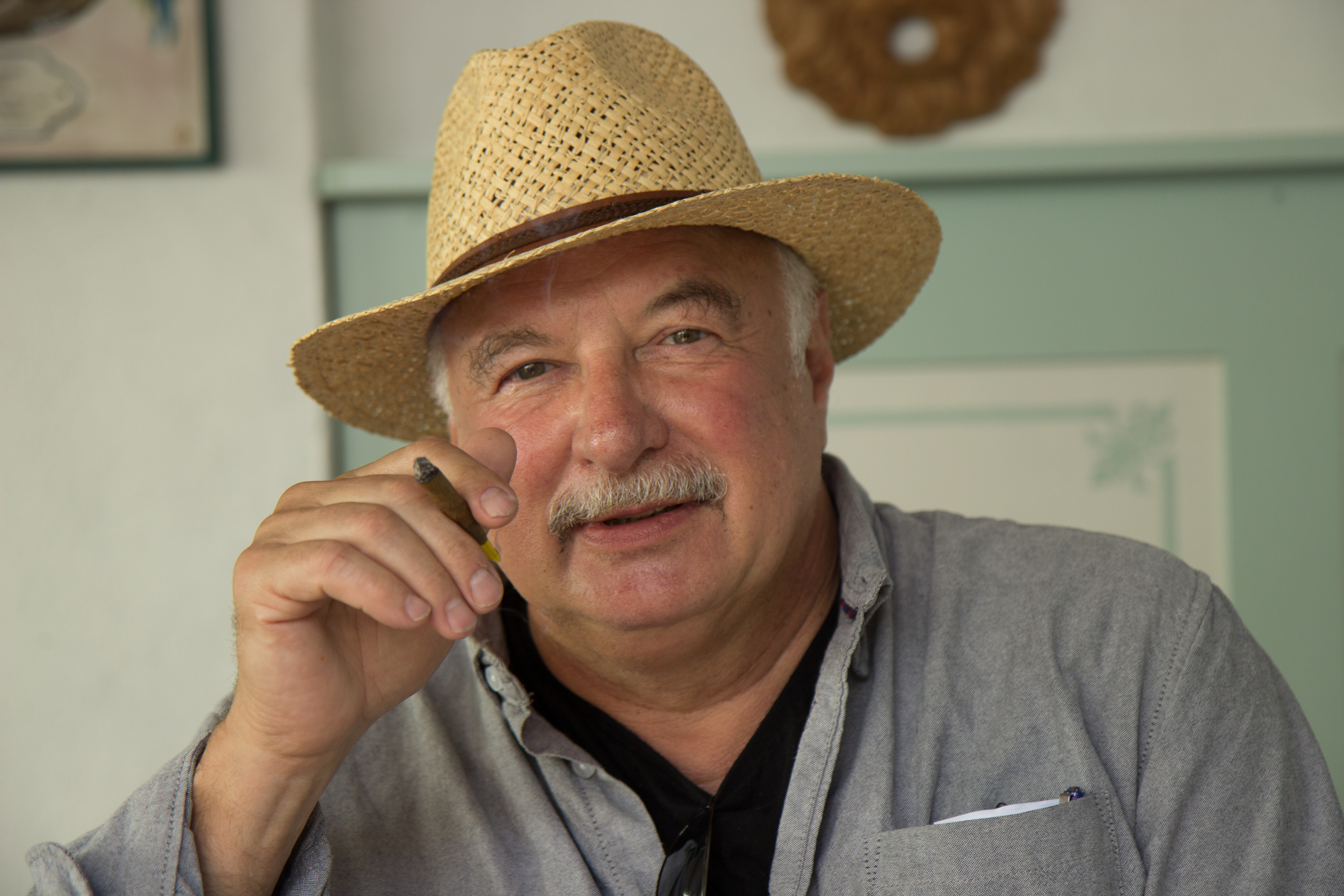
Adrian Naef at the Hausacher Leselenz 2013

Adrian Albert Naef (born 10 January 1948) is a Swiss writer and musician. One of his best known works is Nachtgängers Logik – Journal einer Odyssee (Suhrkamp 2003), a written statement of his struggle against severe depression. It is the first work of his literary comeback after 28 years, again by the same German publishing house as his debut work Lagebericht (Suhrkamp 1975).

== Life ==
Adrian Naef grew up the youngest of three brothers in rural Wallisellen in the Zürcher Oberland. He has a daughter with two children, and divides his time between a house shared with students and musicians in Zürich and his mountain home in the canton of Ticino.

After elementary school he attended commercial school in Zürich. Thereafter, he studied economics in St. Gallen and Zürich, before changing to philosophy where he studied to teach artistic disciplines, among others as a religious education teacher at the catechetical seminar at the University of Zürich. His religious teaching was confessionally independent and open to pupils of all religions. An agnostic religious teacher was unfamiliar in the society of the eighties and caused a great stir. His teaching was based on the philosophy that nobody can get around the question of being – and as a consequence everybody is intrinsically religious, however he suggests people neither need a god nor faith to follow a religious life. This opinion is the basis of three religious pedagogic books, the most well known of which is Gott ist krank, sein Sohn hört Punk (Zytglogge 1981).

During his studies he lived in various flat-sharing communities in Switzerland and abroad, including one of the first occupied houses at the Central station in Zürich, where the Protests of 1968 broke out. Extensive artistic activities including painting and photographing lead to exhibitions which filled his active time as a student outside the auditorium. He was an active participant of the student protests. His activities – partly in the creative underground – had a touch of dadaism, infiltrating right as well as left tenets with nonsense to break each down to the excessively human.

His first book of poems Lagebericht, was published at Suhrkamp in 1975. The legendary publisher Siegfried Unseld introduced him as a coming talent into the intellectual circles of Frankfurt and encouraged him to start a career as a writer. However, Naef already ended his literary production and turned to the songwriter and rock scene.

His disc Riite Rössli was released 1978 and the songs were emitted in the radio as well as in the television. After the closing of the autonomous youth club AJZ, Naef founded and carried on, from 1981 to 1985, a new youth club, called Schülerfoyer, which offered a forum and a home to kids. This also served as a base of rebellious activities such as the pirate transmitter Handradio and the glueing of the wall journal Bulletin during the night. Both projects gained cult status in the stirred town. The youth club was taken over by the city and carried on.

As an independent journalist he wrote for the magazine of the Tagesanzeiger. With other musicians Naef founded 1981 the Niederdorf-Rock-Ensemble, a dadaist rock cabaret that commented regularly the current events. Religious pedagogic books followed in a short sequence, whereby the title Gott ist krank, sein Sohn hört Punk was at first self-published. Due to the great success this title was relaunched by the Zytglogge publishing house, Religion ohne Gott und Teufel followed by the same publisher. Further Naef played in several Swiss film productions, among others in Deshima (direction: Beat Kuert, Japan 1987) and in Rotlicht! (directed by Urs Odermatt, 1986). After a training as a respiratory and body therapist attended by Burkhardt Kiegeland in Salzburg, Naef worked, From 1988 to 1997, as a therapeutic pediatrist at the Zürich children's hospital. There he also organized clinic holiday camps and weekends with children with chronic diseases and their families. This work was abruptly interrupted in autumn 1997 with the fall into a heavy depression. After his three years ongoing illness he began a training as photograph editor at the media education centre MAZ in Lucerne. After that, he worked at the beginning as archivist and then as photograph editor at the Keystone agency in Zürich. His depression experience was the main cause of the new creative phase of the author after a break of nearly thirty years: Nachtgängers Logik was the first book coming out after this inside exploration period. Thereafter, several prosaic, lyrical and books of essays followed.

== Works ==
=== Original works ===
- Also auch du willst nach Japan, BoD – Books on Demand, Zürich 2022 - 2. Auflage, ISBN 978-3-7562-1010-7
- Die Bedrohung, Zocher & peter verlag kmg, Zürich, ISBN 978-3-907159-46-0
- Vieles hätte ich verstanden, wenn man es mir nicht beigebracht hätte, Zocher & peter verlag kmg, Zürich, ISBN 978-3-907159-41-5
- Wie ich den Vögeln den Looping beibrachte, Zocher & peter verlag kmg, Zürich, ISBN 978-3-907159-42-2
- Radio, Wallisellen und der Duft von Benzin, Zocher & peter verlag kmg, Zürich, ISBN 978-3-907159-35-4
- Phoenix Aussichten, Zocher & peter verlag kmg, Zürich, ISBN 978-3-907159-34-7
- Brot statt Spiele: Am Beispiel Tump. weissbooks.w, Frankfurt am Main 2018, ISBN 978-3-86337-146-3
- An der Scheibe mit dem Fisch. weissbooks.w, Frankfurt am Main 2011, ISBN 978-3-86337-016-9.
- Rituale: Woher sie kommen, warum wir sie brauchen. Elster, Zürich, 2014, ISBN 978-3-906065-09-0
- Ein schamloser Blick auf die Dame in Schwarz: 79 Thesen zu Depression und Gesundheit. Elster, Zürich 2011, ISBN 978-3-907668-90-0
- Die Städter. weissbooks.w, Frankfurt am Main 2011, ISBN 978-3-86337-006-0
- Die Rechenmachers. Edition Isele, Eggingen 2006, ISBN 978-3-86142-382-9
- Nachtgängers Logik – Journal einer Odyssee. Mit einem Nachwort von Adolf Muschg. Suhrkamp, Frankfurt am Main 2003, ISBN 978-3-518-41430-9

=== Religious pedagogic books ===
- Zeitbombe Religionen: Eine lexikalische Recherche. Elster, Zürich 2015. ISBN 978-3-906065-30-4.
- Religion ohne Religionen: Was wir vergessen – was wir mitnehmen wollen. Elster, Zürich 2015, ISBN 3-906065-14-6.
- Religion ohne Gott und Teufel. Ein Lexikon. Zytglogge, Bern 1986, ISBN 3-7296-0231-4.
- Gott ist krank, sein Sohn hört Punk. Adrian Naef, 1983, ISBN 3-7296-0161-X.
- Die Beste aller Zeiten: Zitat aus der Rede eines Indianerhäuptlings in Zürich. Sil-Verlag, Zürich 1983, Deutschen Nationalbibliothek 995515611.

=== Poems ===
- Dein Blick im Vorübergehn: Gedichte. Zocher & peter verlag kmg, October 2023, ISBN 978-3-907159-48-4
- Moonshiner: Gedichte & Songs. weissbooks.w, Frankfurt am Main 2017 ISBN 978-3-86337-123-4
- Moonshiner: Gedichte & Songs. private extended version weissbooks.w, Frankfurt am Main 2017
- Raben. weissbooks.w, Frankfurt am Main 2014, ISBN 978-3-86337-066-4
- Mohn. weissbooks.w, Frankfurt am Main 2013, ISBN 978-3-86337-039-8
- An der Scheibe mit dem Fisch. weissbooks.w, Frankfurt am Main 2011, ISBN 978-3-86337-016-9
- Lagebericht. Suhrkamp, Frankfurt am Main 1975, ISBN 978-3-518-03729-4

=== As an editor ===
- Klaus Isele, Adrian Naef (editor): Dasein als Da Sein. Adolf Muschg zum 75. Geburtstag. Isele, Eggingen 2009, ISBN 978-3-86142-463-5.

=== Music ===
- Liederplatte Riite Rössli (dialect songs), Zytglogge Bern 1978.
