= Wallisellen =

- Municipality
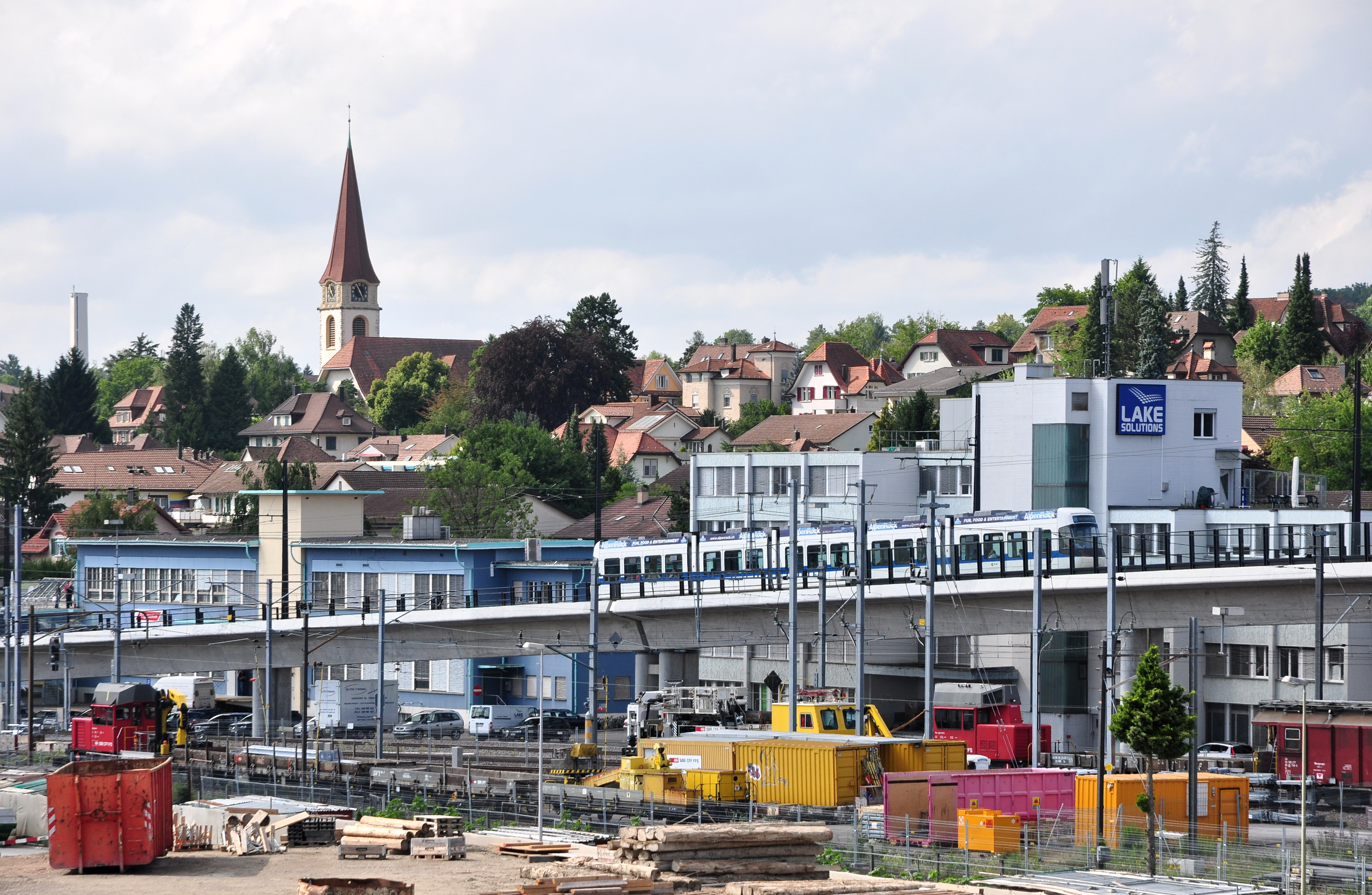

- Flag Coat of arms
- Location of Wallisellen
- Location within Switzerland Location within Canton of Zürich
- Coordinates: 47°25′N 8°36′E
- Country: Switzerland
- Canton: Zürich
- District: Bülach

Area
  - Total: 6.50 km^{2} (2.51 sq mi)
- Elevation: 431 m (1,414 ft)

Population (December 2020)
  - Total: 17,218
  - Density: 2,650/km^{2} (6,860/sq mi)
- Time zone: UTC+01:00 (CET)
  - Summer (DST): UTC+02:00 (CEST)
- Postal code: 8304
- SFOS number: 69
- ISO 3166 code: CH-ZH
- Surrounded by: Dietlikon, Dübendorf, Kloten, Opfikon, Zürich
- Twin towns: Rolle (Switzerland)
- Website: www.wallisellen.ch

Wallisellen is a municipality in the district of Bülach in the canton of Zürich in Switzerland, and belongs to the Glatt Valley (German: Glattal).

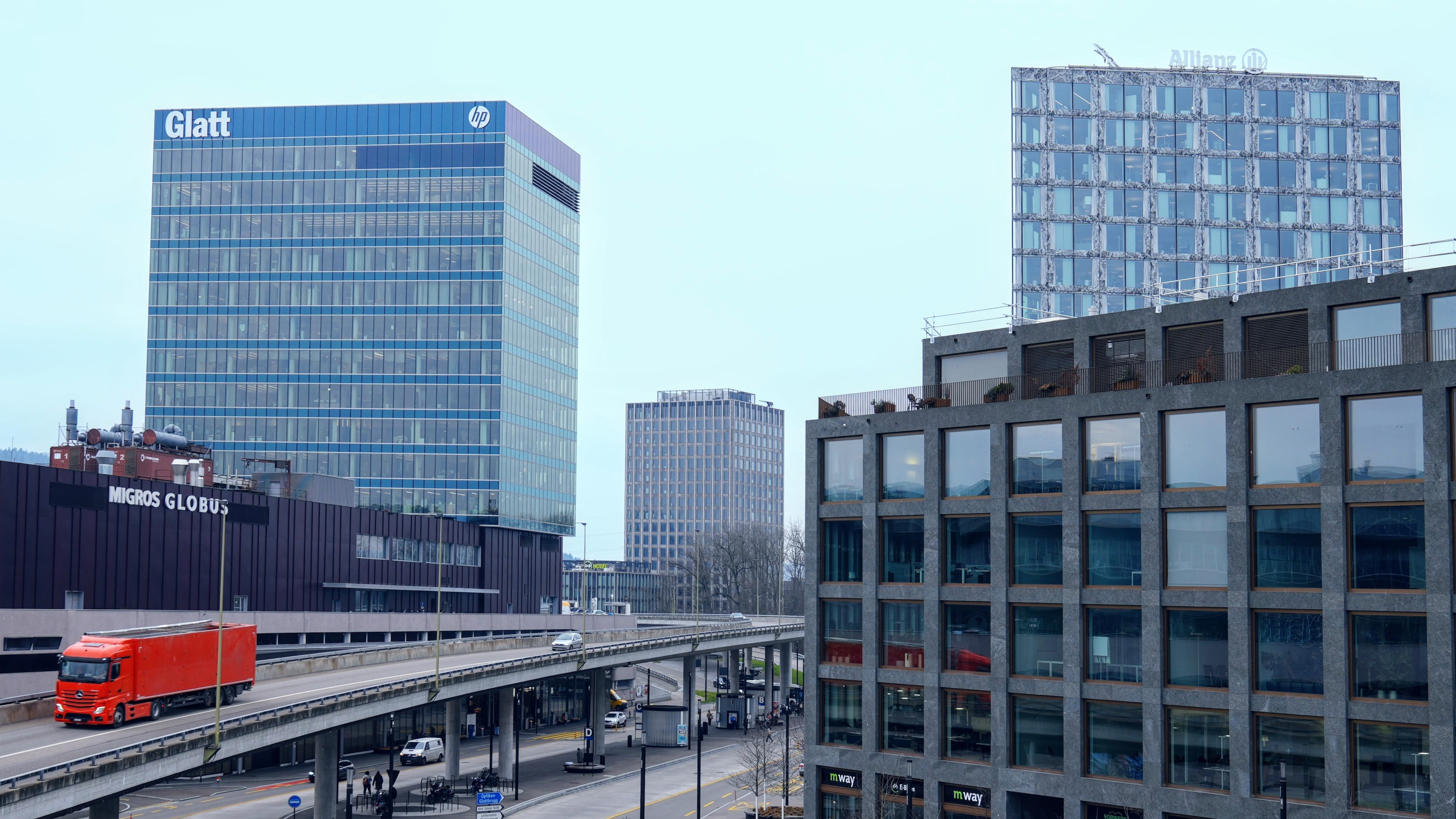
View of the Glattzentrum with Glatt Tower and Richti-Areal from Wallisellen. (Photo: Peter Arnold)

== History ==
Aerial view by Walter Mittelholzer (1935)

The first settlement at Wallisellen dates from 58 BC. The municipality Wallisellen has its origin between 400 and 700 BC, after the Germanic migration of the peoples. Wallisellen is named according to both parts "Walchen" and "Seller". The Germanic peoples described as "Walchen" its Celtic and Romanic neighbours (see Walensee, lake of the Walchen). The word "Seller" stands for immigrated farmers, in contrast to long-established farmers, who cultivated small and modest farms. Linguists think that the name originated because Franks or Alemanni gave the name "Wallisellen" to a small farmer settlement, which was inhabited or founded by Celts or Romans.

With inauguration of the NOB-line Zürich–Wallisellen–Winterthur on 25 June 1856 Wallisellen had its first connection with the Swiss railway network.

In 1916, the municipality of Rieden merged with Wallisellen. In the interwar period Wallisellen developed from a village to a growing suburb-municipality of Zurich, but didn't want to have a town charter.

During the Second World War, Wallisellen participated actively in the "cultivation battle" ("Anbauschlacht", i.e. increase in domestic food production due to reductions in imports).

In 1958 the Roman Catholic church of St. Antonius was built.

== Geography ==
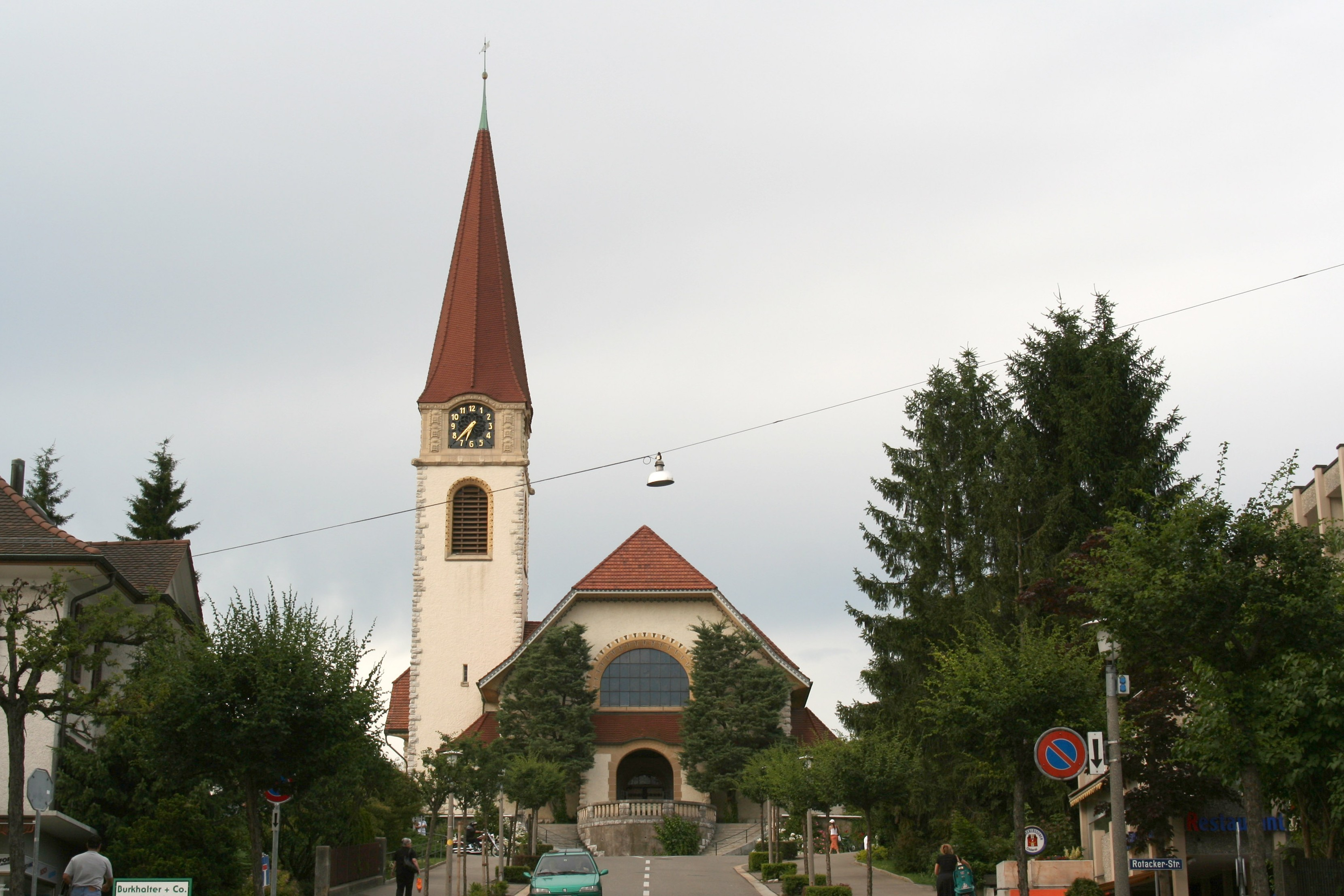
Protestant church of Wallisellen

Wallisellen has an area of 6.5 km^{2} (2.5 sq mi). Of this area, 23.8% is used for agricultural purposes, while 20.1% is forested. Of the rest of the land, 54.5% is settled (buildings or roads) and the remainder (1.5%) is non-productive (rivers, glaciers or mountains).

== Demographics ==
Wallisellen has a population (as of 2022) of 17,299. As of 2007, 25.5% of the population was made up of foreign nationals. Over the last 10 years the population has grown at a rate of 11.8%. Most of the population (as of 2000) speaks German (83.2%), with Italian being second most common ( 3.8%) and Serbo-Croatian being third (1.9%).

In the 2007 election the most popular party was the SVP which received 38.6% of the vote. The next three most popular parties were the SPS (19%), the FDP (15.4%) and the CSP (9.8%).

The age distribution of the population (as of 2000) is children and teenagers (0–19 years old) making up 19.1% of the population, while adults (20–64 years old) make up 64.4% and seniors (over 64 years old) make up 16.5%. In Wallisellen about 76.9% of the population (between age 25-64) have completed either non-mandatory upper secondary education or additional higher education (either university or a Fachhochschule).

Wallisellen has an unemployment rate of 3.21%. As of 2005, there were 50 people employed in the primary economic sector and about 16 businesses involved in this sector. 3085 people were employed in the secondary sector and there were 137 businesses in this sector. 8950 people were employed in the tertiary sector, with 731 businesses in this sector.

== Economy ==
The large Shopping Center Glatt (or Glattzentrum) is an indoor shopping mall in the municipality, which opened in 1975.

Between it and Wallisellen railway station lies Richti Shopping, an open-air shopping center, which was officially opened in winter 2013 and was completed by end of 2014.

Various international companies such as Microsoft, Cisco, Ford Motor Company, UPC Switzerland and NCR have their Swiss headquarters in Wallisellen.

== Transportation ==
Wallisellen Bahnhof is a stop of the Zürich S-Bahn on the lines S8, S14, S19 and on the Stadtbahn Glattal light rail system.

The Line 12 tram serves Wallisellen, with five stops within the municipality; Wallisellen Herti, Wallisellen Belair, Wallisellen Bahnhof, Wallisellen Glatt and Wallisellen Neugut.

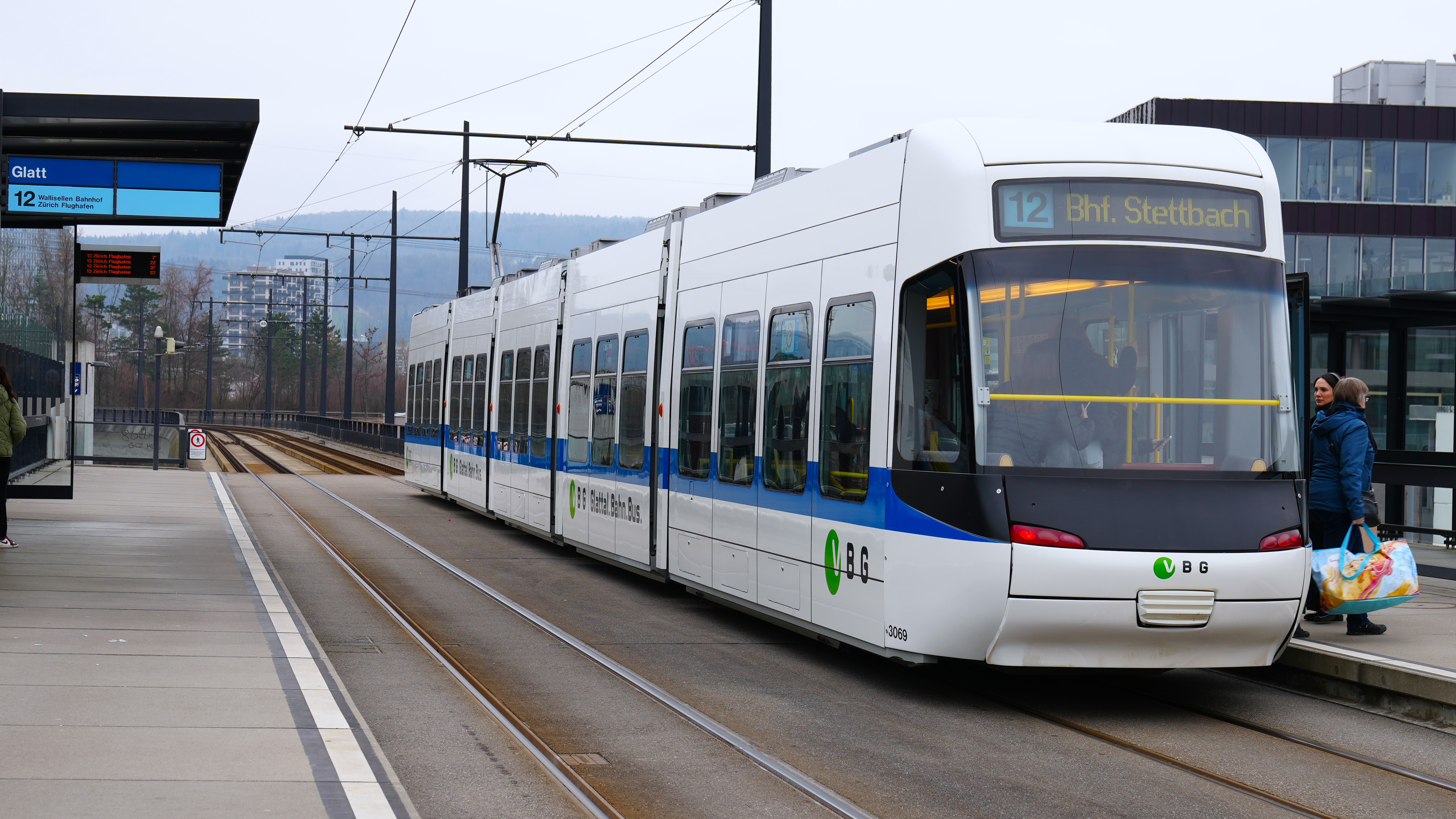
Wallisellen is served by the Glattalbahn tram line. This line connects the town to the city of Zurich and to the airport. (Photo: Peter Arnold)

== Places of interest ==
- Reformed Church
- Doctorhouse
- Shopping Center Glatt, also known as (Glattzentrum)
- Tower of Rieden
- Boulder Nature Trail
- Nature Reserve "Moos"
- Holzers Home "Holz Hütte"
- Holzers Castle "Holzers Schloss"

== Sport and association ==
The largest sports club of Wallisellen is the FC Wallisellen (Football club Wallisellen), which first team in the season 06/07 was promoted to the 2. league. Other successful sports clubs are the EHC Wallisellen (Ice hockey club Wallisellen) and Faustball Wallisellen (Fistball Wallisellen). Also very active is the TV Wallisellen (Gymnastic club Wallisellen). That club has organised since 1993 the Walliseller Lauf (Run of Walisellen), from which all of the earnings go to children who are suffering from cancer. In Wallisellen there are two scout troops: scout troop Gryfensee and scout troop Winkelried.

== Language and rhyme ==
Wallisellen is known in the German part of Switzerland due to a rhyme: "Aazelle, Bölle schelle, d'Chatz gaht uf Walliselle, chunnt si wider hei, hät si chrummi Bei, piff paff puff und du bisch (ehr und redlich) duss".

German translation: "Anzählen, Zwiebeln schälen, die Katze geht nach Wallisellen, kommt sie wieder nach Hause, hat sie krumme Beine, pfiff paff und du bist (ehr und redlich) draussen".

English translation: "Counting, peeling onions, the cat goes to Wallisellen, comes she back home, has she crooked legs, piff paff and you are (honestly and candidly) outside".

A song of the Bernese dialect-band Stiller Has is "Walliselle".

Today the native German-speaking population speaks a mixture of Swiss German dialects. A levelled Zurich-German with a tendency of integration of elements of German is widespread. Long-time residents recognise only in its pronunciation of the toponym Wallisellen with sharp "s".

== Notable people ==
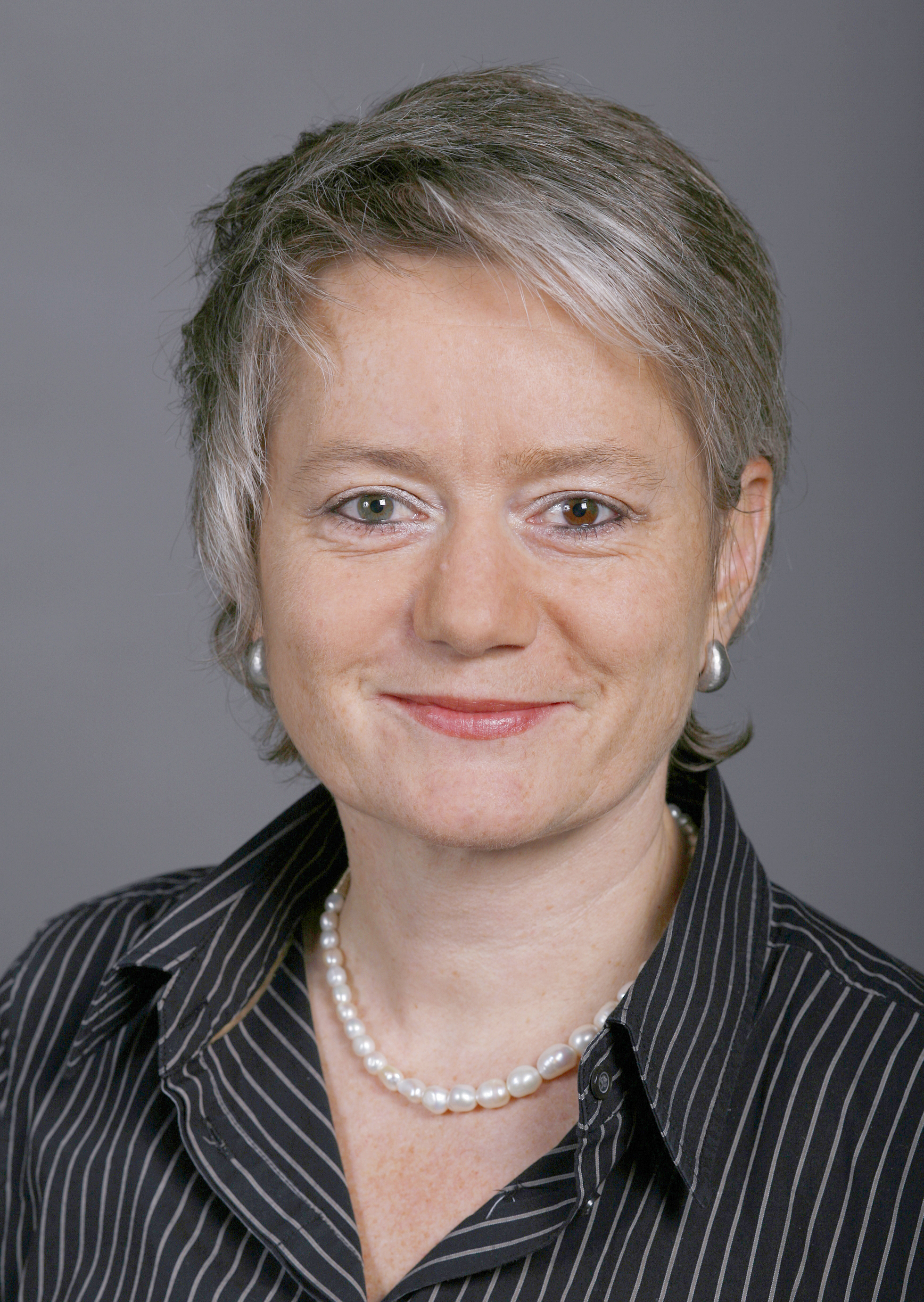
Jacqueline Fehr, 2007

- Anton Trieb (1883 – 1954 in Wallisellen), watercolourist, illustrator and graphic designer
- Charles Rathgeb(1897–1988), soldier and honorary citizen of Wallisellen
- Kurt Wüthrich (born 1938 in Aarberg), chemist and prize winner in the Nobel Prize in Chemistry
- Beat Fehr (1943 in Wallisellen – 1967) a racing driver
- Adrian Naef (born 1948) a Swiss writer and musician, grew up in Wallisellen
- Pierangelo Boog (born 1957), graphic designer, illustrator and artist, lives in Wallisellen
- Daniel Rohr (born 1960 in Zürich), actor, director and theater manager
- Jacqueline Fehr (born 1963 in Wallisellen) politician on the Swiss National Council.
- Sven Ninnemann (born 1974), German professional dancer in the field of standard and Latin
- Fabienne Liechti (born 1978) a Los Angeles-based professional ballroom dancer and choreographer
- Sven Riederer (born 1981) triathlon athlete, bronze medallist at the 2004 Summer Olympics and Swiss champion
- Pius Suter (born 1996) ice hockey player for the ZSC Lions, National League Top Scorer in 2019-20, now playing for the Vancouver Canucks in the NHL
