= Yasen Petrov =

Bulgarian footballer

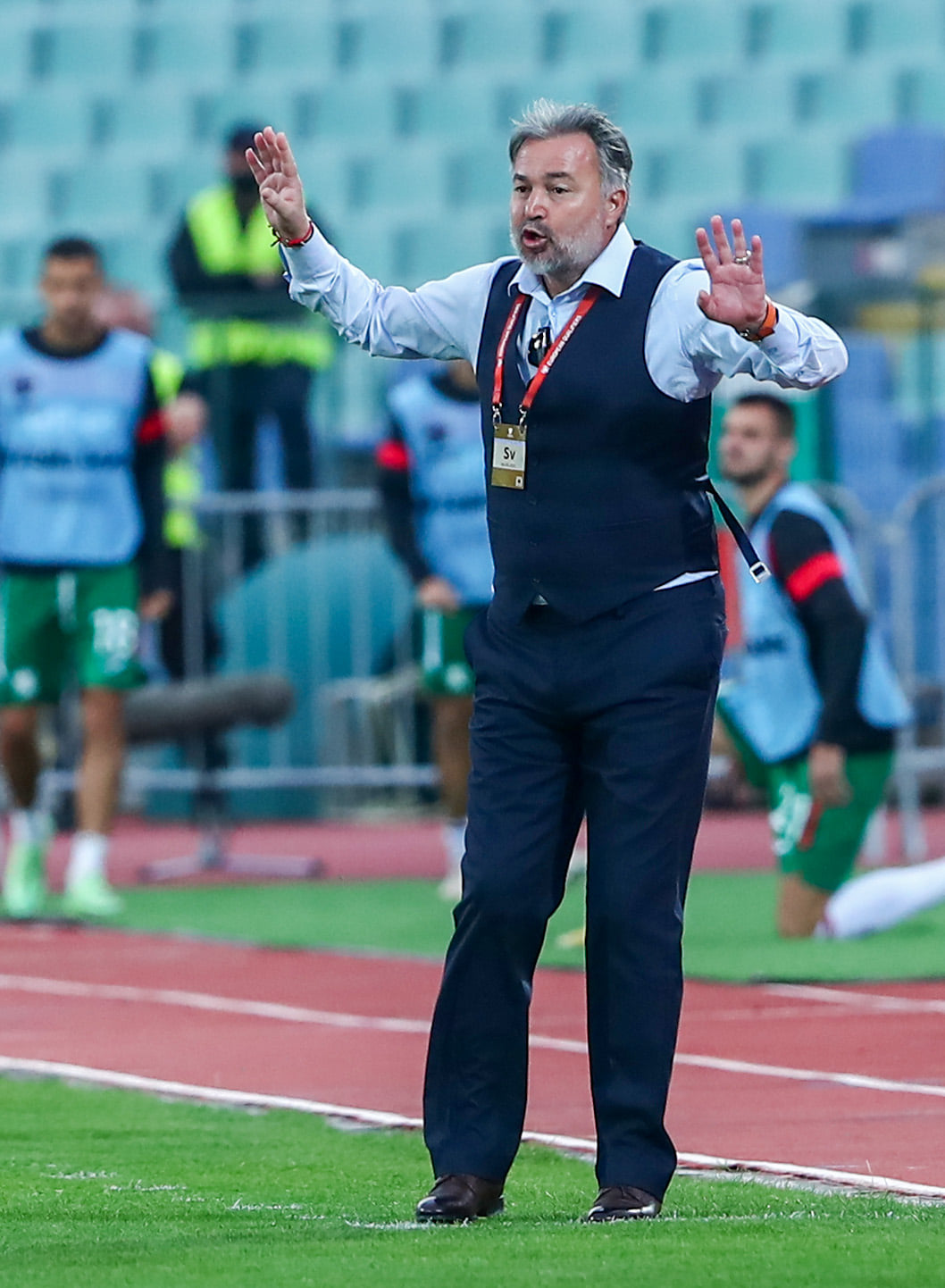

Personal information
- Full name: Yasen Petrov
- Date of birth: 23 June 1968 (age 58)
- Place of birth: Plovdiv, Bulgaria
- Height: 1.83 m (6 ft 0 in)
- Position: Attacking midfielder

Senior career*
Years	Team	Apps	(Gls)
1990–1991	Botev Plovdiv	27	(11)
1991–1992	Levski Sofia	26	(1)
1992–1994	Botev Plovdiv	37	(10)
1994–1997	Lokomotiv Sofia	58	(12)
1997	Wuhan Yaqi	11	(3)
1998	Jiangsu Sainty	14	(4)
1998–1999	Lokomotiv Sofia	16	(0)
1999	Alki Larnaca	12	(4)
2000	Slavia Sofia	11	(0)
2000	SV Meppen	6	(0)
2001	Tennis Borussia Berlin	10	(0)
2001	Chengdu Wuniu	4	(1)
Total		305	(73)

International career
1993	Bulgaria	3	(0)

Managerial career
- 2002–2004: Lokomotiv Sofia
- 2004–2006: Botev Plovdiv
- 2006–2007: Cherno More Varna
- 2007–2008: Lokomotiv Plovdiv
- 2008: Naftex Burgas
- 2010–2011: Levski Sofia
- 2013: Botev Vratsa
- 2014–2016: Shijiazhuang Yongchang
- 2017: Beijing Enterprises
- 2017: Henan Jianye
- 2018–2019: Shijiazhuang Yongchang
- 2021–2022: Bulgaria
- 2023–2025: Qingdao Hainiu
- 2026: Dobrudzha
- 2026: Spartak Varna
- * Club domestic league appearances and goals

Yasen Petrov Petrov (Bulgarian: Ясен Петров Петров; born 23 June 1968) is a Bulgarian former football player and current manager. His nickname is Giannini from Plovdiv.

== Career ==
Born in Plovdiv, Bulgaria, Petrov played for the PFC Botev Plovdiv, PFC Levski Sofia, PFC Slavia Sofia and PFC Lokomotiv Sofia. He also played for the Bulgaria national team.

== Manager ==
He has managed PFC Lokomotiv Sofia, PFC Botev Plovdiv, and PFC Cherno More Varna. His most famous achievement as a coach is his debut for Lokomotiv Plovdiv, beating his old team and eternal city rivals Botev Plovdiv 4–0.

=== Levski Sofia ===
On 20 May 2010, Yasen Petrov was presented as a new head coach of Levski Sofia. He started great after a win in the Eternal Derby. Then after series of good matches, Levski qualified for UEFA Europa League after eliminating Dundalk F.C., Kalmar FF and AIK Fotboll. Levski was drawn in Group C, facing Gent, Lille and Sporting CP. At the end of the season, Levski Sofia finished 2nd and Petrov was released from the club.

=== Managing career abroad ===
Petrov has also worked as manager of teams in China.

=== Bulgaria ===
In January 2021, Petrov was appointed as manager of Bulgaria. His first match in charge of the team was a March 2021 World Cup qualifier against Switzerland, which Bulgaria lost by a score of 1:3. On 5 June 2022, Petrov resigned after a 2:5 loss against Georgia in a Nations League match.

== Awards ==
- As a player
  - Bulgarian Cup (2): 1992, 1995
- As a manager

Cherno More Varna:

- Bulgarian Cup:
  - (Runner-up): 2006

Shijiazhuang Ever Bright F.C.:

- China League One:
  - (Runner-up): 2014

== Managerial Statistics ==
As of Match played 8 February 2026

Team	Nat.	From	To	Record							
Team	Nat.	From	To	G	W	D	L	Win %	GF	GA	GD
Lokomotiv Sofia	(Bulgaria)	1 November 2002	15 August 2004	29	8	6	15	27.59	36	49	-13
Botev Plovdiv	(Bulgaria)	30 August 2004	27 November 2005	12	2	4	6	16.67	10	22	-12
Cherno More Varna	(Bulgaria)	13 March 2006	30 June 2007	39	20	6	13	51.28	53	42	11
Lokomotiv Plodiv	(Bulgaria)	24 September 2007	14 March 2008	14	7	2	5	50.00	18	9	9
Levski Sofia	(Bulgaria)	1 July 2010	28 May 2011	45	31	6	8	68.89	95	44	51
Levski Sofia	(Bulgaria)	7 April 2012	30 May 2012	7	5	1	1	71.43	24	7	17
Botev Vratsa	(Bulgaria)	1 July 2013	23 September 2013	7	2	3	2	28.57	8	8	0
Shijiazhuang Ever Bright	(China)	12 December 2013	14 July 2016	68	24	22	22	35.29	80	79	1
Beijing Enterprises	(China)	30 December 2016	23 April 2017	7	0	1	6	0.00	4	16	-12
Henan Jianye	(China)	13 June 2017	28 September 2017	15	5	4	6	33.33	18	22	-4
Shijiazhuang Ever Bright	(China)	8 September 2018	19 July 2019	27	13	3	11	48.15	54	39	15
Bulgaria	(Bulgaria)	14 January 2021	5 June 2022	17	3	5	9	17.65	17	31	-14
Qingdao Hainiu	(China)	25 December 2023	17 January 2025	32	9	5	18	28.13	33	60	-27
Dobrudzha	(Bulgaria)	4 January 2026	Present	1	1	0	0	100.00	3	0	+3
Total				320	130	68	122	40.63	453	428	+25
