= Frédéric Page =

Swiss footballer (born 1978)

Personal information
- Full name: Frédéric-Laurent Page
- Date of birth: 28 December 1978 (age 47)
- Place of birth: Menziken, Switzerland
- Height: 1.84 m (6 ft 0 in)
- Position: Centre-back

Youth career
- FC Sion
- 1990–1996: FC Aarau

Senior career*
Years	Team	Apps	(Gls)
1996–2003	FC Aarau	150	(6)
2004–2004	Union Berlin	30	(3)
2004–2006	Greuther Fürth	43	(1)
2006–2007	SpVgg Unterhaching	27	(0)
2007–2009	FC Aarau	61	(3)
2009–2011	Neuchâtel Xamax	69	(4)
2011–2012	Lausanne-Sport	22	(0)
2012–2013	Neuchâtel Xamax	19	(5)
- * Club domestic league appearances and goals

Frédéric Laurent Page (born 28 December 1978) is a Swiss former professional footballer who played as a centre-back.

== Career ==
Page had been a member of FC Aarau youth team and made his debut in the 1996–97 season. Over the next six years, he became a regular at Brugglifeld, making a total of 145 appearances and scoring six goals. Page signed an improved two-year contract in summer 2002, but one year later he left for Germany. He spent the next four years playing in the 2. Bundesliga, first at Union Berlin, followed by two seasons at SpVgg Greuther Fürth and finally a season at SpVgg Unterhaching.

In the summer of 2007, he was re-signed by FC Aarau, on a contract until 30 June 2009. After his time at Aarau, Page spent two years with Neuchâtel Xamax before signing with FC Lausanne-Sport on 8 July 2011. He left Lausanne after one season, rejoining former club Neuchâtel Xamax. He retired at the end of the 2012–13 season.
