= Umberto Romano (footballer) =

Swiss footballer (born 1973)

Personal information
- Full name: Umberto Romano
- Date of birth: 6 January 1973 (age 53)
- Place of birth: Zürich, Switzerland
- Height: 1.83 m (6 ft 0 in)
- Positions: Centre back; defensive midfielder

Team information
- Current team: Zürich (caretaker)

Senior career*
Years	Team	Apps	(Gls)
1991–1992	Zürich	3	(0)
1992–1993	Wettingen	25	(6)
1993–1994	Zürich	3	(0)
1994	St. Gallen	8	(0)
1994–1995	Baden	34	(5)
1995–1996	Locarno	34	(9)
1996–1997	Winterthur	31	(10)
1997–2001	Delémont	48	(8)
2001–2003	Wil	61	(13)
2004	Malcantone Agno	15	(0)
2004–2009	Winterthur	98	(8)
2009–2011	Linth 04	21	(1)
2011–2012	Küsnacht	7	(0)
Total		388	(60)

International career
	Switzerland U-21	1	(0)

Managerial career
- 2009–2011: Linth 04 (player-coach)
- 2011–2012: Küsnacht (player-coach)
- 2012–2015: Wohlen (assistant)
- 2015–2017: Winterthur (U18)
- 2015: Winterthur (interim)
- 2017: Winterthur
- 2018–2021: Lausanne-Sport (assistant)
- 2021–2024: Zürich (academy)
- 2024: Zürich (caretaker)
- * Club domestic league appearances and goals

Umberto Romano (born 6 January 1973) is a Swiss former footballer. He was most recently the interim co-trainer of Zürich.

== Career ==
=== Club career ===
Romano began his career at Zürich for whom he played three times in the 1991/92 season, then played for Wettingen, before returning to Zürich to play three times for the club. He then played for St. Gallen, Baden, Locarno, Winterthur and Delémont. He then played for Wil, with whom he was promoted to the Swiss Super League (formerly named Nationalliga A) and contributed two goals to the highest-scoring game in the highest Swiss league. Then, he played at Malcantone Agno. Finally, he played a total of five seasons at Winterthur, including being a captain there. In 2009, he moved to Linth 04, then played for one season at Küsnacht, before retiring.

=== Coaching career ===
On 2 June 2009, was named as the new player-coach of Linth 04. He was in charge until the summer 2011, where he joined FC Küsnacht, also as a player-coach. In the summer 2012, he became assistant coach of Wohlen, until the summer of 2015.

In the summer of 2015, Romano returned to Winterthur as head coach for the club's U18 team. On 27 November 2015, he was also appointed interim head coach of Winterthur's first team, following the departure of Jürgen Seeberger. He was replaced at the end of the year with two victories in two games and continued in his position as U18 coach. He took charge of the club's first team once again in February 2017, this time on a permanent basis. He was fired on 18 December 2017.

In June 2018, Romano was appointed assistant manager of Lausanne-Sport.

In 2021, he joined Zürich as coach of their U18 squad. On 2 January 2024, he switched from coaching Zürich's U19 squad to assistant coach of the first team. On 13 February 2024, he was appointed as interim co-trainer of Zürich, alongside Murat Ural, following Bo Henriksen's sudden departure. The two of them were dismissed from their positions on 22 April 2024, as the team had slipped from third to sixth position in the table.
