= Stefano Razzetti =

Italian footballer and trainer

Personal information
- Date of birth: 13 September 1971 (age 55)
- Place of birth: Pizzighettone, Italy
- Height: 1.84 m (6 ft 1/2 in)
- Position: Goalkeeper

Team information
- Current team: St. Gallen (goalkeeping coach)

Senior career*
| Years | Team | Apps | (Gls) |
| 1994–1999 | Cremonese | 68 | (0) |
| 1996–1997 | → Acireale (loan) | 32 | (0) |
| 1999–2003 | Lugano | 205 | (0) |
| 2003–2008 | St. Gallen | 164 | (0) |
| 2008–2009 | Pizzighettone | 30 | (0) |
| 2009–2011 | Sant'Angelo | 61 | (0) |

Managerial career
- 2011–2018: St. Gallen (U21 GK coach)
- 2011–: St. Gallen (GK coach)
- * Club domestic league appearances and goals

Stefano Razzetti (born 13 September 1971) is an Italian football goalkeeper trainer and a former player who works for the Swiss club St. Gallen. As a player, he appeared in Serie A and the Swiss Super League.
