= Jochen Dries =

German footballer & manager (born 1947)

Personal information
- Date of birth: 24 February 1947 (age 79)
- Position: Forward

Senior career*
Years	Team	Apps	(Gls)
1970–1972	Borussia Neunkirchen		
1972–1974	1. FSV Mainz 05		

Managerial career
- 1995–1997: SC Kriens
- 1998: Étoile Carouge FC
- 1998: FC Sion
- 1999–2000: FC Aarau
- 2003–2004: FC Lausanne-Sport
- 2011–2012: SC Kriens
- 2014: FC Sion (assistant)
- 2014: FC Sion
- * Club domestic league appearances and goals

Jochen Dries (born 24 February 1947) is a retired German football striker and later manager.
