= Lionel Moret =

Swiss footballer (born 1977)

Personal information
- Date of birth: 16 January 1977 (age 49)
- Position: Defender

Senior career*
Years	Team	Apps	(Gls)
1993–1995	FC Monthey		
1995–1998	Neuchâtel Xamax		
1998–1999	FC Sion		
1999–2000	Neuchâtel Xamax		
2000–2006	FC Bex		
- * Club domestic league appearances and goals

Lionel Moret (born 16 January 1977) is a retired Swiss football defender.
