= Fabinho (footballer, born 1975) =

Brazilian footballer

Personal information
- Full name: Fábio de Souza
- Date of birth: 10 April 1975 (age 51)
- Place of birth: Magé, Brazil
- Height: 1.71 m (5 ft 7 1/2 in)
- Position: Defender

Team information
- Current team: Herisau
- Number: 12

Senior career*
Years	Team	Apps	(Gls)
1997–1998	Moto Club		
1998–1999	FC Wil	14	(7)
1999–2000	SR Delémont	36	(2)
2000–2004	FC Wil	111	(19)
2004–2006	FC St. Gallen	44	(1)
2006–2007	FC Schaffhausen	8	(0)
2007–	FC Herisau		
- * Club domestic league appearances and goals

Fabinho (literally little Fábio) real name Fábio de Souza (born 10 April 1975) is a Brazilian footballer. He is currently coach with FC Herisau.
