= Rumen Ivanov =

Bulgarian footballer (1973–2024)

Personal information
- Full name: Rumen Ivanov Ivanov
- Date of birth: 14 September 1973
- Place of birth: Bulgaria
- Date of death: 8 November 2024 (aged 51)
- Height: 1.80 m (5 ft 11 in)
- Position: Forward

Senior career*
Years	Team	Apps	(Gls)
1991–1994	Etar V. Tarnovo	64	(16)
1994–1996	Botev Plovdiv	53	(15)
1996	Levski Sofia	2	(1)
1996–1998	Young Boys	52	(29)
1998–2000	Aarau	86	(37)
2001	Baden	12	(5)
2001–2003	Waldhof Mannheim	24	(2)
2003	Botev Plovdiv	9	(3)
2004	Rodopa Smolyan	5	(1)
2004–2005	Metalik Sopot		
2005	Vihar Gorublyane		
2006	Etar V. Tarnovo	11	(6)
2006	Botev-Bali		
2007	Lyubimetz 2007		
2008	Naftex Burgas	8	(4)
2008	Frenaros 2000		
2009	Etar V. Tarnovo	25	(11)
2010	Zagorets Nova Zagora		
2010	Botev Krivodol	8	(1)
2011–2012	Lokomotiv Gorna Oryahovitsa		
- * Club domestic league appearances and goals

Rumen Ivanov (Bulgarian: Румен Иванов; 14 September 1973 – 8 November 2024) was a Bulgarian professional footballer who played as a forward. He died from a heart attack on 8 November 2024, at the age of 51.

== Honours ==
Botev Plovdiv

- Bulgarian Cup: runner-up 1995

Individual

- Swiss Challenge League top scorer: 1998 (with 24 goals)
