= Léonard Thurre =

Swiss footballer (born 1977)

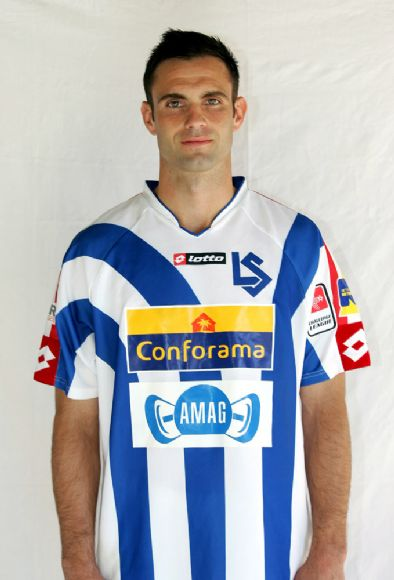

Personal information
- Full name: Léonard Thurre
- Date of birth: 9 September 1977 (age 49)
- Place of birth: Lausanne, Switzerland
- Height: 1.78 m (5 ft 10 in)
- Position: Forward

Youth career
- –1994: Team Lausanne-Vaud

Senior career*
Years	Team	Apps	(Gls)
1995–1999	Lausanne-Sport	106	(24)
1999–2004	Servette	93	(30)
2004–2006	Sion	50	(19)
2006–2008	Lausanne-Sport	46	(6)
2008–2009	Echallens	2	(0)
Total		297	(79)

International career^{‡}
2000–2003	Switzerland	8	(0)

Managerial career
- 2014–2015: Lausanne-Sport (sports director)
- * Club domestic league appearances and goals as of 11:00, 18 July 2018 (UTC) ‡ National team caps and goals as of 11:00, 18 July 2018 (UTC)

Léonard Thurre (born 9 September 1977) is a Swiss former international footballer.

== Career ==
After 8 caps with no goals, Thurre was recalled to the Swiss international set-up in 2004, being included in the 26-man provisional squad for the UEFA Euro 2004, however he did not make the final squad.

After retiring, Thurre took up a position as sports director of former club Lausanne-Sport, a position he held for a year until he mutually agreed to leave the club. It was reported that he wanted more responsibilities, which the club was unwilling to offer.

== Personal life ==
Thurre has a son, Maxence, who was born on 27 May 2012.

== Career statistics ==
=== International ===
As of 2004.

National team	Year	Apps	Goals
Switzerland	2000	2	0
Switzerland	2001	1	0
Switzerland	2002	2	0
Switzerland	2003	3	0
Total		8	0

== Honours ==
Sion

- Swiss Cup: 2005–06
