= Sławomir Wojciechowski =

Polish footballer

Personal information
- Date of birth: 6 September 1973 (age 53)
- Place of birth: Gdańsk, Poland
- Height: 1.84 m (6 ft 0 in)
- Position: Midfielder

Senior career*
| Years | Team | Apps | (Gls) |
| 1989–1993 | Lechia Gdańsk | 84 | (16) |
| 1993–1995 | Zawisza Bydgoszcz | | |
| 1995–1998 | GKS Katowice | 100 | (30) |
| 1998–1999 | FC Aarau | 36 | (6) |
| 2000–2001 | Bayern Munich | 3 | (1) |
| 2001 | FC Aarau | 15 | (1) |
| 2001–2002 | RKS Radomsko | 9 | (2) |
| 2004–2007 | Lechia Gdańsk | 61 | (10) |
| 2007–2008 | Viktoria Köln | | |
| 2008–2009 | Olimpia Grudziądz | 18 | (0) |

International career
- Poland U16
| 1997 | Poland | 4 | (0) |
Medal record
Representing Poland
Men's football
UEFA European Under-16 Championship
| Third place | 1990 East Germany |
- * Club domestic league appearances and goals

Sławomir Wojciechowski (born 6 September 1973) is a Polish former professional footballer who played as a midfielder.

== Honours ==
Bayern Munich

- Bundesliga: 1999–2000
- DFB-Pokal: 1999–2000
- DFB-Ligapokal: 2000
- UEFA Champions League: 2000–01

Lechia Gdańsk

- III liga, group II: 2004–05
- IV liga Pomerania: 2003–04

Olimpia Grudziądz

- III liga Kuyavia-Pomerania – Greater Poland: 2008–09

Poland U16

- UEFA European Under-16 Championship third place: 1990
