= 1999–2000 in Swiss football =

Football in Switzerland
- Season: 1999–2000

Men's football
- Nationalliga A: St. Gallen
- Nationalliga B: Sion
- 1. Liga: Group 1: Chênois; Group 2: Wangen b.O. Group 3: Locarno; Group 4: Vaduz

Women's football
- Swiss Women's Super League: FFC Bern
- Swiss Cup: FFC Bern

The following is a summary of the 1999–2000 season of competitive football in Switzerland.

== Nationalliga A ==
=== Qualification phase ===
Pos	Team	Pld	W	D	L	GF	GA	GD	Pts	Qualification
1	St. Gallen	22	13	6	3	42	25	+17	45	Advance to championship round halved points (rounded up) as bonus
2	Basel	22	9	10	3	31	21	+10	37	Advance to championship round halved points (rounded up) as bonus
3	Lausanne-Sport	22	9	9	4	35	25	+10	36	Advance to championship round halved points (rounded up) as bonus
4	Grasshopper Club	22	9	7	6	40	25	+15	34	Advance to championship round halved points (rounded up) as bonus
5	Yverdon-Sports	22	7	9	6	28	25	+3	30	Advance to championship round halved points (rounded up) as bonus
6	Xamax	22	7	7	8	34	33	+1	28	Advance to championship round halved points (rounded up) as bonus
7	Luzern	22	8	4	10	28	29	−1	28	Advance to championship round halved points (rounded up) as bonus
8	Servette	22	8	4	10	32	36	−4	28	Advance to championship round halved points (rounded up) as bonus
9	Zürich	22	6	8	8	21	29	−8	26	Continue to promotion/relegation round
10	Aarau	22	7	5	10	30	42	−12	26	Continue to promotion/relegation round
11	Lugano	22	5	6	11	27	34	−7	21	Continue to promotion/relegation round
12	SR Delémont	22	4	5	13	24	48	−24	17	Continue to promotion/relegation round

Source: rsssf.com
Rules for classification: 1) points; 2) goal difference; 3) number of goals scored.

=== Championship round ===
The first eight teams of the qualification phase competed in the Championship round. The teams took half of the points (rounded up to complete units) gained in the qualification as bonus with them.

Pos	Team	Pld	W	D	L	GF	GA	GD	BP	Pts	Qualification
1	St. Gallen (C)	14	9	4	1	33	14	+19	23	54	Qualification to Champions League third qualifying round
2	Lausanne-Sport	14	8	2	4	22	13	+9	18	44	Qualification to UEFA Cup qualifying round
3	Basel	14	5	6	3	16	16	0	19	40	Qualification to UEFA Cup qualifying round
4	Grasshopper Club	14	5	5	4	30	26	+4	17	37	Qualification to Intertoto Cup first round
5	Luzern	14	5	2	7	17	30	−13	14	31	
6	Servette	14	4	5	5	25	21	+4	14	31	
7	Xamax	14	4	3	7	25	29	−4	14	29	Qualification to Intertoto Cup first round
8	Yverdon-Sports	14	2	1	11	16	35	−19	15	22	

Source: rsssf.com
Rules for classification: 1) points; 2) Position in the qualification.
(C) Champions

== Nationalliga B ==
=== Qualification phase ===
Pos	Team	Pld	W	D	L	GF	GA	GD	Pts	Qualification
1	Bellinzona	22	13	5	4	43	17	+26	44	Advance to promotion/relegation NLA/LNB round
2	Sion	22	12	4	6	41	21	+20	40	Advance to promotion/relegation NLA/LNB round
3	Thun	22	10	8	4	34	24	+10	38	Advance to promotion/relegation NLA/LNB round
4	Baden	22	10	7	5	32	20	+12	37	Advance to promotion/relegation NLA/LNB round
5	Kriens	22	10	7	5	37	28	+9	37	Continue to relegation round NLB/1. Liga halved points (rounded up) as bonus
6	Étoile Carouge	22	9	8	5	24	18	+6	35	Continue to relegation round NLB/1. Liga halved points (rounded up) as bonus
7	Winterthur	22	9	3	10	30	33	−3	30	Continue to relegation round NLB/1. Liga halved points (rounded up) as bonus
8	Wil	22	8	5	9	40	41	−1	29	Continue to relegation round NLB/1. Liga halved points (rounded up) as bonus
9	Solothurn	22	7	2	13	29	37	−8	23	Continue to relegation round NLB/1. Liga halved points (rounded up) as bonus
10	Young Boys	22	5	6	11	31	45	−14	21	Continue to relegation round NLB/1. Liga halved points (rounded up) as bonus
11	Stade Nyonnais	22	5	3	14	30	53	−23	18	Continue to relegation round NLB/1. Liga halved points (rounded up) as bonus
12	Schaffhausen	22	2	6	14	16	50	−34	12	Continue to relegation round NLB/1. Liga halved points (rounded up) as bonus

Source: RSSSF
Rules for classification: 1) points; 2) goal difference; 3) number of goals scored.

=== Promotion/relegation group NLA/NLB ===
The teams in the ninth to twelfth positions in Nationalliga A competed with the top four teams of Nationalliga B in a Nationalliga A/B promotion/relegation round.

Pos	Team	Pld	W	D	L	GF	GA	GD	Pts	Promotion or relegation
1	Lugano	14	8	4	2	26	18	+8	28	Remain in NLA
2	Sion (P)	14	7	3	4	28	19	+9	24	Promoted to NLA
3	Zürich	14	7	3	4	17	12	+5	24	Remain in NLA
4	Aarau	14	6	4	4	23	16	+7	22	Remain in NLA
5	Bellinzona	14	4	8	2	21	14	+7	20	Remain in NLB
6	Thun	14	4	4	6	17	18	−1	16	Remain in NLB
7	Delémont (R)	14	4	2	8	18	29	−11	14	Relegated to NLB
8	Baden	14	1	2	11	7	31	−24	5	Remain in NLB

Source: rsssf.com
Rules for classification: 1) points; 2) goal difference; 3) number of goals scored.
(P) Promoted; (R) Relegated

=== Relegation group NLB/1. Liga ===
The last eight teams of the qualification phase competed in the relegation group against relegation to the 1. Liga. The teams took half of the points (rounded up to complete units) gained in the qualification as bonus with them.

Pos	Team	Pld	W	D	L	GF	GA	GD	BP	Pts	Relegation
1	Wil	14	6	6	2	20	12	+8	15	39	Remain in NLB
2	Kriens	14	5	4	5	17	19	−2	19	38	Remain in NLB
3	Winterthur	14	5	7	2	23	16	+7	15	37	Remain in NLB
4	Young Boys	14	6	6	2	22	13	+9	11	35	Remain in NLB
5	Étoile Carouge	14	1	8	5	10	17	−7	18	29	Remain in NLB
6	Solothurn	14	4	3	7	15	20	−5	12	27	Remain in NLB
7	Stade Nyonnais	14	3	5	6	19	27	−8	9	23	Relegated to 1. Liga
8	Schaffhausen	14	3	7	4	20	22	−2	6	22	Relegated to 1. Liga

Source: RSSSF
Rules for classification: 1) points; 2) Position in the qualification.

== 1. Liga ==
=== Group 1 ===
Pos	Team	Pld	W	D	L	GF	GA	GD	Pts	Qualification or relegation
1	CS Chênois	26	14	8	4	57	34	+23	50	Play-off to Nationalliga B
2	FC Bex	26	15	3	8	54	42	+12	48	Not eligible for play-offs
3	FC Naters	26	12	9	5	55	28	+27	45	Decider for play-off
4	FC Meyrin	26	12	9	5	39	33	+6	45	Decider winners, play-off to Nationalliga B
5	Vevey Sports	26	12	8	6	53	31	+22	44	
6	FC Echallens	26	11	7	8	58	40	+18	40	
7	FC Martigny-Sports	26	10	7	9	43	41	+2	37	
8	FC Bulle	26	11	4	11	38	43	−5	37	
9	Grand-Lancy FC	26	9	7	10	42	41	+1	34	
10	FC Stade Lausanne	26	8	10	8	45	47	−2	34	
11	US Terre Sainte	26	9	5	12	35	34	+1	32	
12	FC Renes	26	9	4	13	46	58	−12	31	Relegation to 2. Liga Interregional
13	FC Visp	26	4	4	18	29	61	−32	16	Relegation to 2. Liga Interregional
14	Signal FC Bernex-Confignon	26	2	3	21	27	88	−61	9	Relegation to 2. Liga Interregional

Source: Erste Liga official website
Rules for classification: 1) Points; 2) Goal difference within the league, but play-off for qualifiers.

==== Decider ====
Due the fact that the club FC Bex had infrastructural deficiencies, they were not eligible to enter the play-offs for promotion to the Nationalliga B, this right was passed down to the third placed club in the division. Because the teams from Naters and Meyrin ended the season level on points they had to play a league positions decider. The match was played on a neutral ground and it took place on May 24, 2000, in Martigny.

Team 1	Score	Team 2
Meyrin	2–0	Naters

Meyrin win the decider and advance to play-offs.

=== Group 2 ===
Pos	Team	Pld	W	D	L	GF	GA	GD	Pts	Qualification or relegation
1	FC Wangen bei Olten	26	18	5	3	52	23	+29	59	Play-off to Nationalliga B
2	FC Wohlen	26	14	9	3	34	12	+22	51	Play-off to Nationalliga B
3	FC Fribourg	26	14	6	6	61	28	+33	48	
4	FC Serrières	26	13	9	4	38	20	+18	48	
5	FC Biel-Bienne	26	11	10	5	42	37	+5	43	
6	FC Münsingen	26	12	5	9	41	28	+13	41	
7	FC Colombier	26	9	11	6	41	25	+16	38	
8	FC La Chaux-de-Fonds	26	11	5	10	31	35	−4	38	
9	FC Grenchen	26	8	8	10	33	35	−2	32	
10	FC Concordia Basel	26	8	6	12	26	42	−16	30	
11	SV Muttenz	26	7	4	15	33	48	−15	25	
12	SC Bümpliz 78	26	6	5	15	29	48	−19	23	Relegation to 2. Liga Interregional
13	FC Stade Payerne	26	4	6	16	27	56	−29	18	Relegation to 2. Liga Interregional
14	SV Lyss	26	1	3	22	18	69	−51	6	Relegation to 2. Liga Interregional

Source: Erste Liga official website
Rules for classification: 1) Points; 2) Goal difference within the league, but play-off for qualifiers.

=== Group 3 ===
Pos	Team	Pld	W	D	L	GF	GA	GD	Pts	Qualification or relegation
1	FC Locarno	26	19	3	4	57	21	+36	60	Play-off to Nationalliga B
2	Zug 94	26	14	6	6	46	25	+21	48	Play-off to Nationalliga B
3	FC Tuggen	26	14	5	7	59	30	+29	47	
4	FC Malcantone Agno	26	14	5	7	42	31	+11	47	
5	FC Chiasso	25	13	4	8	39	31	+8	43	
6	FC Schötz	26	12	5	9	52	41	+11	41	
7	SC Buochs	26	10	10	6	57	48	+9	40	
8	FC Rapperswil-Jona	26	9	8	9	42	43	−1	35	
9	FC Mendrisio	26	8	3	15	36	48	−12	27	
10	FC Freienbach	26	8	3	15	32	53	−21	27	
11	FC Sursee	26	7	5	14	36	63	−27	26	
12	FC Küsnacht	26	5	7	14	31	57	−26	22	Relegation to 2. Liga Interregional
13	FC Ascona	26	4	9	13	32	47	−15	21	Relegation to 2. Liga Interregional
14	SC Cham	25	2	11	12	24	47	−23	17	Relegation to 2. Liga Interregional

Source: Erste Liga official website
Rules for classification: 1) Points; 2) Goal difference within the league, but play-off for qualifiers.

=== Group 4 ===
Pos	Team	Pld	W	D	L	GF	GA	GD	Pts	Qualification or relegation
1	FC Vaduz	26	16	6	4	65	22	+43	54	Play-off to Nationalliga B
2	FC Red Star Zürich	26	15	6	5	56	26	+30	51	Play-off to Nationalliga B
3	SC Young Fellows Juventus	26	14	7	5	64	32	+32	49	
4	FC Kreuzlingen	26	13	7	6	39	21	+18	46	
5	FC Gossau	26	13	7	6	37	24	+13	46	
6	FC Altstetten	26	12	8	6	47	25	+22	44	
7	FC Horgen	26	11	4	11	42	48	−6	37	
8	FC Rorschach	26	9	5	12	32	48	−16	32	
9	FC Widnau	26	8	6	12	38	38	0	30	
10	SV Schaffhausen	26	9	3	14	30	52	−22	30	
11	FC Schwamendingen	26	7	5	14	41	65	−24	26	
12	FC Wülflingen	26	5	8	13	36	67	−31	23	Relegation to 2. Liga Interregional
13	FC Frauenfeld	26	5	7	14	31	51	−20	22	Relegation to 2. Liga Interregional
14	USV Eschen/Mauren	26	4	3	19	29	68	−39	15	Relegation to 2. Liga Interregional

Source: Erste Liga official website
Rules for classification: 1) Points; 2) Goal difference within the league, but play-off for qualifiers.

=== Promotion play-off ===
The four group winners and the four runners-up played in the qualification round of the play-offs. The winners here would advance to the two finals. Both final winners would be promoted to the Nationalliga B.

Qualification round

Team 1	Score	Team 2
Meyrin	0–4	Wangen b.O.
Wangen b.O.	1–2	Meyrin

Wangen b.O. win 5–2 on aggregate and continue to the finals.

Team 1	Score	Team 2
Red Star	0–2	Locarno
Locarno	2–1	Red Star

Locarno win 4–1 on aggregate and continue to the finals.

Team 1	Score	Team 2
Zug 94	2–1	Vaduz
Vaduz	3–2	Zug 94

4–4 on aggregate, Zug 94 win on away goals and continue to the finals.

Team 1	Score	Team 2
Wohlen	0–1	Chênois
Chênois	1–2	Wohlen

2–2 on aggregate, Wohlen win on away goals and continue to the finals.

Final round

Team 1	Score	Team 2
Locarno	3–1	Wohlen
Wohlen	3–3	Locarno

Locarno win 6–4 on aggregate and are promoted to Nationalliga B.

Team 1	Score	Team 2
Zug 94	2–1	Wangen b.O.
Wangen b.O.	2–0	Zug 94

Wangen b.O. win 3–2 on aggregate and are promoted to Nationalliga B.

== Swiss Cup ==
The four winners of the quarter-finals played in the semi-finals. The winners of the first drawn semi-final is considered as home team in the final.

4 May 2000
20:15
First semi-final

FC Zürich	7 – 2 (a.e.t.)	FC Luzern
Bartlett 18', 79', 94'; Frick 98'; Del Signore 107' (pen.); Jamarauli 113'; Chassot 116'	Sportalbum summary	7' Frei; 78' (red card) 117' Gian; (yellow card) 78' Branca

Letzigrund, Zürich
Attendance: 7,300
Referee: (Switzerland) Markus Nobs (Wohlen)

11 May 2000
20:15
Second semi-final

FC Lausanne-Sport	3 – 2	FC Lugano
Kuźba 8', 20', 60'		79' Gaspoz; 81' Rothenbühler

Olympique de la Pontaise, Lausanne
Attendance: 5,000
Referee: (Switzerland) Marcel Vollenweider (Ruti ZH)

Final

28 May 2000
15:00

FC Zürich	2 – 2 (a.e.t.)	FC Lausanne-Sport
Jamarauli 77'; Bartlett 95'	Report	35' Danilevičius; 105' Gerber
Penalties
Fischer (penalty scored); Douglas (penalty scored); Kavelashvili (penalty scored)	3 – 0	(penalty missed) Ohrel; (penalty missed) Londono; (penalty missed) Christ

Wankdorf, Bern
Attendance: 18,500
Referee: Carlo Bertolini (Vira)

== Swiss Clubs in Europe ==
- Servette as 1998–99 Nationalliga A champions: Champions League third qualifying round
- Grasshopper Club as runners-up: UEFA Cup qualifying round
- Zürich as fourth placed team: UEFA Cup qualifying round
- Lausanne-Sport as 1998–99 Swiss Cup winners: UEFA Cup first round
- Basel: Intertoto Cup first round
- Xamax: Intertoto Cup first round
- Vaduz as 1998–99 Liechtenstein Cup winners: UEFA Cup qualifying round

=== Servette ===
==== Champions League ====
===== Third qualifying round =====
11 August 1999 First leg	Sturm Graz (Austria)	2–1	(Switzerland) Servette	Stadion Graz-Liebenau, Graz
21:15 (CET)	Vastić 33'; Martens 45'	Report	Lonfat 45+3'	Attendance: 10,688; Referee: Lucílio Batista (Portugal)

25 August 1999 Second leg	Servette (Switzerland)	2–2	(Austria) Sturm Graz	Charmilles Stadium, Geneva
20:45 (CET)	Juárez 50'; Thurre 89'	Report	Kocijan 54'; Vastić 78'	Attendance: 8,400; Referee: Graham Barber (England)

Sturm Graz won 4–3 on aggregate.

==== UEFA Cup ====
===== First round =====
16 September 1999 First leg	Aris (Greece)	1–1	(Switzerland) Servette	Kleanthis Vikelidis Stadium, Thessaloniki
20:00	Mantzios 11'	Report	Petrov 88'	Attendance: 17,127; Referee: Knud Erik Fisker (Denmark)

30 September 1999 Second leg	Servette (Switzerland)	1–2 (a.e.t.)	(Greece) Aris	Charmilles Stadium, Geneva
20:30	Lonfat 35'	Report	Paulo Andrioli 37'; Kyzeridis 97'	Attendance: 5,228; Referee: René Temmink (Netherlands)

Aris won 3–2 on aggregate.

=== Grasshoppers ===
==== UEFA Cup ====
===== Qualifying round =====
12 August 1999 First leg	Grasshopper (Switzerland)	4–0	(Republic of Ireland) Bray Wanderers	Hardturm, Zürich
19:30	Chapuisat 30', 62'; Isabella 77', 84'	Report		Attendance: 5,600; Referee: Marian Salomir (Romania)

26 August 1999 Second leg	Bray Wanderers (Republic of Ireland)	0–4	(Switzerland) Grasshopper	Tolka Park, Dublin
20:00		Report	Tikva 6', 38' de Napoli 53'; Muff 65'	Attendance: 2,500; Referee: Anton Stredák (Slovakia)

Grasshopper won 8–0 on aggregate.

===== First round =====
16 September 1999 First leg	AB Copenhagen (Denmark)	0–2	(Switzerland) Grasshopper	Gladsaxe Stadium, Gladsaxe
20:30		Report	Bjur 50' (o.g.); Ekoku 82'	Attendance: 3,297; Referee: Laurent Duhamel (France)

30 September 1999 Second leg	Grasshopper (Switzerland)	1–1	(Denmark) AB Copenhagen	Hardturm, Zürich
20:35	Magro 80'	Report	Daugaard 31'	Attendance: 3,800; Referee: Mika Peltola (Finland)

Grasshopper won 3–1 on aggregate.

===== Second round =====
21 October 1999 First leg	Slavia Prague (Czech Republic)	3–1	(Switzerland) Grasshopper	Stadion Evžena Rošického, Prague
17:00	Ulich 19', 50'; Kuchař 40'	Report	Yakin 23'	Attendance: 4,555; Referee: Éric Poulat (France)

4 November 1999 Second leg	Grasshopper (Switzerland)	1–0	(Czech Republic) Slavia Prague	Hardturm, Zürich
19:00	Yakin 76'	Report		Attendance: 3,300; Referee: Luc Huyghe (Belgium)

Slavia Prague won 3–2 on aggregate.

=== Zürich ===
==== UEFA Cup ====
===== Qualifying round =====
12 August 1999 First leg	Sliema Wanderers (Malta)	0–3	(Switzerland) Zürich	Ta' Qali National Stadium, Ta' Qali
19:30		Report	Kavelashvili 35'; Bartlett 79'; Keke 90'	Attendance: 3,000; Referee: Kyros Vassaras (Greece)

26 August 1999 Second leg	Zürich (Switzerland)	1–0	(Malta) Sliema Wanderers	Letzigrund, Zürich
19:30	Douglas 69'	Report		Attendance: 7,000; Referee: Luan Zylfo (Albania)

Zürich won 4–0 on aggregate.

===== First round =====
16 September 1999 First leg	Zürich (Switzerland)	1–0	(Belgium) Lierse	Letzigrund, Zürich
20:00	Jamarauli 29'	Report		Attendance: 4,200; Referee: Michael McCurry (Scotland)

30 September 1999 Second leg	Lierse (Belgium)	3–4	(Switzerland) Zürich	Het Lisp, Lier
20:00	Van Meir 16'; Huysegems 72'; Zdebel 83'	Report	Jamarauli 2'; Frick 57'; Eydelie 86'; Daems 90' (o.g.)	Attendance: 4,936; Referee: Erol Ersoy (Turkey)

Zürich won 5–3 on aggregate.

===== Second round =====
21 October 1999 First leg	Zürich (Switzerland)	1–2	(England) Newcastle United	Letzigrund, Zürich
20:15	Castillo 68'	Report	Marić 51'; Shearer 60'	Attendance: 9,600; Referee: Jacek Granat (Poland)

4 November 1999 Second leg	Newcastle United (England)	3–1	(Switzerland) Zürich	St James' Park, Newcastle
21:00	Marić 33'; Ferguson 58'; Speed 61'	Report	Jamarauli 17'	Attendance: 34,502; Referee: Domenico Messina (Italy)

Newcastle United won 5–2 on aggregate.

=== Lausanne ===
==== UEFA Cup ====
===== First round =====
16 September 1999 First leg	Lausanne-Sports (Switzerland)	3–2	(Spain) Celta Vigo	Olympique de la Pontaise, Lausanne
20:15	Kuzba 20'; Mazzoni 21', 57'	Report	Revivo 62'; Karpin 66' (pen.)	Attendance: 7,770; Referee: Gary Willard (England)

30 September 1999 Second leg	Celta Vigo (Spain)	4–0	(Switzerland) Lausanne-Sports	Balaídos, Vigo
20:00	McCarthy 11', 84', 90+2'; Mostovoi 76'	Report		Attendance: 12,840; Referee: Stéphane Bré (France)

Celta Vigo won 6–3 on aggregate.

=== Basel ===
==== Intertoto Cup ====
===== First round =====
20 June 1999 First leg	Korotan Prevalje (Slovenia)	0 – 0	(Switzerland) Basel	Stadion na Prevaljah, Prevalje
17:00	Benedejcic (yellow card) 4'; Ristic (yellow card) 71'	Summary	(yellow card) 69' Cantaluppi; (yellow card) 73' Huggel; (yellow card) 77' Ceccaroni	Attendance: 2,000; Referee: Georgios Kasnaferis (Greece)

26 June 1999 Second leg	Basel (Switzerland)	6 – 0 (6 – 0 agg.)	(Slovenia) Korotan Prevalje	Stadion Schützenmatte, Basel
17:30	Kreuzer 10' (pen. 1:0); Koumantarakis 18' (2:0); Koumantarakis 24' (3:0); Ceccaroni (yellow card) 38'; Koumantarakis 43' (4:0); Cantaluppi 58' (5:0); Koumantarakis 78' (6:0)	Summary		Attendance: 2,600; Referee: Costas Kapitanis (Cyprus)

Basel won 6–0 on aggregate.

===== Second round =====
4 July 1999 First leg	Basel (Switzerland)	0 – 0	(Czech Republic) Boby Brno	Stadion Schützenmatte, Basel
17:30		Summary	(yellow card) 75' Zubek; (yellow card) 80' Zbončák	Attendance: 2,600; Referee: Sorin Corpodean (Romania)

11 July 1999 Second leg	Boby Brno (Czech Republic)	2 – 4 (2 – 4 agg.)	(Switzerland) Basel	Stadion Za Lužánkami, Brno
18:00	Křivánek (yellow card) 9'; Křivánek 19' (1:1); Patrik Holomek (yellow card) 46'; Siegl (yellow card) 50'; Zbončák 51' (2:2); Cihlar (yellow card) 84'	Summary	10' (pen. 0:1) Tholot; (yellow card) 24' Güner; 37' (1:2) Cantaluppi; 71' (2:3) Savić; (yellow card) 79' Pérez; 89' (2:4)Kehrli	Attendance: 2,600; Referee: Eduardo Iturralde González (Spain)

Basel won 4–2 on aggregate.

===== Third round =====
18 July 1999 First leg	Hamburg (Germany)	0 – 1	(Switzerland) Basel	Lohmühle, Lübeck
18:00	Hoogma (yellow card) 65'	Summary	15' Koumantarakis; (yellow card) 47' Quennoz; (yellow card) 72' Zuberbühler	Attendance: 8,192; Referee: Miroslav Radoman (FR Yugoslavia)

24 July 1999 Second leg	Basel (Switzerland)	2 – 3 (3 – 3 agg.)	(Germany) Hamburg	Stadion Schützenmatte, Basel
16:45	Quennoz (yellow card) 29'; Koumantarakis 50' (1:3); Koumantarakis 57' (2:3); Koumantarakis (yellow card) 84'; Huggel (yellow card) 90+3'	Summary	37' (0:1) Fischer; 44' (0:2) Groth; 48' (0:3) Yeboah; (yellow card) 62' Grammozis; (yellow card) 64' Hashemian	Attendance: 3,756; Referee: René Temmink (Netherlands)

3–3 on aggregate, Hamburg won on away goals rule.

=== Xamax ===
==== Intertoto Cup ====
===== First round =====
20 June 1999 First leg	Shelbourne (Republic of Ireland)	0–0	(Switzerland) Neuchâtel Xamax	Tolka Park, Dublin
				Attendance: 1,612; Referee: Ferenc Bede (Hungary)

27 June 1999 Second leg	Neuchâtel Xamax (Switzerland)	2–0	(Republic of Ireland) Shelbourne	Stade de la Maladière, Neuchâtel
	N'Diaye 71'; Perret 79'			Attendance: 2,100; Referee: Edo Trivković (Croatia)

Neuchâtel Xamax won 2–0 on aggregate.

===== Second round =====
3 July 1999 First leg	Neuchâtel Xamax (Switzerland)	0–2	(Hungary) Vasas	Stade de la Maladière, Neuchâtel
			Aranyos 21'; Szilveszter 30'	Attendance: 750; Referee: Paulo Costa (Portugal)

10 July 1999 Second leg	Vasas (Hungary)	1–0	(Switzerland) Neuchâtel Xamax	Stadion Rudolf Illovszky, Budapest
	Sowunmi 31'			Attendance: 500; Referee: Johnny Ditlefsen (Norway)

Vasas won 3–0 on aggregate.

=== Vaduz ===
==== UEFA Cup ====
===== Qualifying round =====
12 August 1999 First leg	Bodø/Glimt (Norway)	1–0	(Liechtenstein) Vaduz	Aspmyra Stadion, Bodø
18:00	Staurvik 28'	Report		Attendance: 3,400; Referee: Darius Miezelis (Lithuania)

26 August 1999 Second leg	Vaduz (Liechtenstein)	1–2	(Norway) Bodø/Glimt	Rheinpark Stadion, Vaduz
19:00	Wegmann 38'	Report	Sæternes 29', 83'	Attendance: 1,500; Referee: Kevin Parry (Wales)

Bodø/Glimt won 3–1 on aggregate.

== Sources ==
- Switzerland 1999–2000 at RSSSF
- 1. Liga season 1999–2000 at the official website
- Switzerland Cup 1999–2000 at RSSSF
- Cup finals at Fussball-Schweiz
- UEFA Intertoto Cup 1999 at RSSSF
- Josef Zindel (2018). FC Basel 1893. Die ersten 125 Jahre (in German). Basel: Friedrich Reinhardt Verlag. ISBN 978-3-7245-2305-5.

Preceded by 1998–99	Seasons in Swiss football	Succeeded by 2000–01
