= 1999–2000 FC Basel season =

FC Basel
1999–2000 season
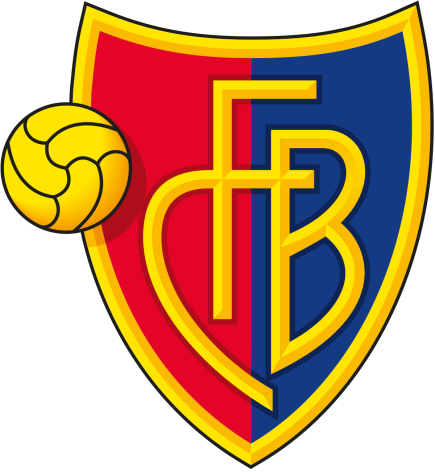
- Club president: René C. Jäggi
- Head coach: Christian Gross
- Ground: Stadion Schützenmatte
- NLA Qualification round: 2nd of 12
- Championship round: 3rd of 8
- Swiss Cup: Quarterfinals
- 1999 UEFA Intertoto Cup: Round 3
- Top goalscorer: League: George Koumantarakis (13); All: George Koumantarakis (24)
- Highest home attendance: 11,750 on 29 August 1999 vs Zürich
- Lowest home attendance: 5,203 on 27 November 1999 vs Lausanne-Sport
- Average home league attendance: 7,680

The 1999–2000 Fussball Club Basel 1893 season was their 106th season since the club's foundation. Following their promotion at the end of the 1993–94 season this was their sixth consecutive season in the highest tier of Swiss football. René C. Jäggi was the club's chairman for the fourth year.

== Overview ==
FC Basel played their home games in the Stadion Schützenmatte, which is situated in the west of the city about one and a half kilometers from the city centre. This became their temporary home for two years, because the old St. Jakob Stadium was demolished and the new stadium was to be built on the same site, situated in the south-east of the city, neighboring the municipalities of Muttenz and Münchenstein. The construction of the new stadium was to be completed in a little more than two years. The new stadium, the St. Jakob-Park, was to be an all seater, the old stadium had standing places on three sides.

On 15 June 1999, club president René C. Jäggi appointed Christian Gross as the new first team head-coach and he assigned Ruedi Zbinden as his co-trainer. Forming his new team, Gross made a number of signings before the season started. These new signings included defensive players such as Alexandre Quennoz, who signed from Sion, Ivan Knez from Luzern and Murat Yakin who came from Fenerbahçe and forwards such as George Koumantarakis who signed in from Luzern, Didier Tholot from Sion and Thomas Häberli from Kriens. The most interest was raised in the signing of Pascal Zuberbühler in a goalkeeper swap with Stefan Huber who then went to Grasshopper Club. In the outwards direction Mario Frick transferred to Zürich, Abedi to Yverdon and Fabrice Henry to Hibernian in Scottland (on loan).

== The Campaign ==
=== Pre-season friendlies ===
Before the domestic League season started on 7 July Basel had little time to get things ready. They organised one test game against lower-tier SR Delémont, which was played in Laufen and won 2–0, and they entered the Sempione Cup, which was played in Balsthal. Here Basel played the semi-final against Brazilian team Ituano FC, which was lost, and the third place match against Croatian Dinamo Zagreb, in which they also suffered a defeat.

There were five other friendly matches, but these were played mid-season, most by local lower-tier sides.

=== Domestic League ===
The qualifying round of the League season 1999–2000 was contested by twelve teams. The first eight teams of the First Stage (or Qualification) were then to compete in the Championship Round. The season started on 7 July. Basel's priority aim was to reach the Championship stage and end the season in the top three. The season started sub-optimal, the team remained unbeaten, but with just three wins and four draws in the first seven rounds, they lost contact to the table leaders. Following their first defeat, in the away game against Lausanne-Sport, Basel improved their position in the table with another three victories. Basel suffered their first home defeat on 2 October against Yverdon-Sports, but they ended the Qualification Round in second position in the league table.

The Championship Round started on 12 March 2000. The participating teams took half of the points (rounded up to complete units) gained in the Qualification as bonus with them. Basel played amongst the table leaders and in the tenth round they even managed a 3–1 victory against league leaders St. Gallen. However, in their last four matches Basel won only two further points and dropped to third position behind champions St Gallen and Lausanne, against whom the final game of the season ended in a 0–3 home defeat on 7 June 2000. Nevertheless, Basel qualified for the 2000–01 UEFA Cup.

=== Domestic Cup ===
Basel's clear aim for the Swiss Cup was to win the title. In the round of 32, they were drawn away against Mendrisio. In the next round a home game against Grasshopper Club, ended in a draw and was eventually won in the penalty shoot out. The quarterfinal against Lausanne-Sport ended the cup run. Lausanne continued and advanced to the final, but here they were beaten by Zürich in a penalty shoot-out.

=== Europe ===
Basel were qualified for the 1999 UEFA Intertoto Cup. The first round was played against Slovenian team Korotan Prevalje on 20 and 26 June 1999 and won 6–0 on aggregate. The second round draw brought the Czech Republic club Boby Brno to Basel on 4 July. The return leg a week later gave Basel a 4–2 victory on aggregate. Although the first leg of the third round was won away from home against Hamburg, the Germans won the second leg in the Stadion Schützenmatte and Hamburg proceeded due to the away goals rule.

== Players ==
=== First team squad ===
The following is the list of the Basel first team squad. It includes all players that were in the squad the day the season started on 7 July 1999 but subsequently left the club after that date and it includes all players that transferred in during the season.

Note: Flags indicate national team as defined under FIFA eligibility rules; some limited exceptions apply. Players may hold more than one non-FIFA nationality.

No.	Pos.	Nation	Player
1	GK	SUI	Pascal Zuberbühler
2	DF	SUI	Massimo Ceccaroni
3	DF	SUI	Luís Calapes
4	DF	SUI	Alexandre Quennoz
5	DF	GER	Oliver Kreuzer
6	DF	SUI	Philippe Cravero
7	FW	LIE	Marco Pérez (loan to SR Delémont)
8	MF	SUI	Raphael Kehrli
9	FW	RSA	George Koumantarakis
10	MF	RUS	Aleksandr Rytchkov
11	FW	TUR	Cetin Güner
12	DF	SUI	Sébastien Barberis
13	DF	SUI	Marco Tschopp
14	FW	RUS	Nenad Savić
16	MF	SUI	Benjamin Huggel

No.	Pos.	Nation	Player
17	MF	SUI	Mario Cantaluppi
18	GK	SUI	Oliver Stöckli
19	DF	BRA	Fabinho (contract ended)
20	DF	SUI	Ivan Knez
21	MF	SUI	Didier Tholot
22	MF	TUR	Atilla Sahin (loan to Göztepe Izmir)
23	DF	SUI	Murat Yakin
24	DF	SUI	Thomas Häberli
25	GK	CIV	Slaven Matan (on loan to Young Boys)
26	FW	GHA	Edmond N'Tiamoah (from youth team)
27	FW	ZIM	Agent Sawu
29	FW	SUI	Urs Güntensperger
—	FW	RUS	Daniel Dobrovoljski
—	FW	SUI	Deniz Mendi
—	FW	FRA	Olivier Boumelaha (from youth team)

=== Transfers in ===
Note: Flags indicate national team as defined under FIFA eligibility rules; some limited exceptions apply. Players may hold more than one non-FIFA nationality.

No.	Pos.	Nation	Player
1	GK	SUI	Pascal Zuberbühler (from Grasshopper Club)
4	DF	SUI	Alexandre Quennoz (from Sion)
8	MF	SUI	Raphael Kehrli (from Young Boys)
9	FW	RSA	George Koumantarakis (from Luzern)
14	FW	RUS	Nenad Savić (from Xamax)

No.	Pos.	Nation	Player
18	GK	SUI	Oliver Stöckli (from Baden)
20	DF	SUI	Ivan Knez (from Luzern)
21	MF	SUI	Didier Tholot (from Sion)
23	DF	SUI	Murat Yakin (from Fenerbahçe)
24	DF	SUI	Thomas Häberli (from Kriens)
27	FW	ZIM	Agent Sawu (from Young Boys)

=== Transfers out ===
Note: Flags indicate national team as defined under FIFA eligibility rules; some limited exceptions apply. Players may hold more than one non-FIFA nationality.

No.	Pos.	Nation	Player
1	GK	SUI	Stefan Huber (to Grasshopper Club)
8	MF	LIE	Mario Frick (to Zürich)

No.	Pos.	Nation	Player
9	MF	FRA	Fabrice Henry (to Hibernian (on loan))
24	DF	BRA	Abedi (to Yverdon)

== Results ==
Legend

Win Draw Loss Postponed

=== Friendly matches ===
==== Pre- and mid-season ====
23 June 1999 Pre-season	Basel (Switzerland)	2–0	(Switzerland) SR Delémont	Im Nau, Laufen
19:00	Mendi 11' (1:0); Kehrli 24' (2:0)	FCB summary		Attendance: 1,000; Referee: (Switzerland) Andreas Schluchter (Schönenbuch)
Note: FCB still without Zuberbühler. Rytschkow, Abedi (both missing), Kreuzer, Cantaluppi, Ceccaroni, and Huggel (rested).

1 July 1999 Sempione-Cup; Semi-final	Basel (Switzerland)	1–3	(Brazil) Ituano FC	Moos, Balsthal
20:00	Tschopp 41' (1:0)	FCB summary	(yellow card) 8' Hermes; 51' (1:1) Nene; (yellow card) 65' Nene; 76' (1:2) Didi; 82' (1:3) Brasilia	Attendance: 2,600; Referee: (Switzerland) Dieter Schoch (Attiswil)
Note: The Sempione Cup was a club tournament played in summer at Sportanlage Moos, Balsthal, during the years 1987 to 2004. FCB ohne Tholot (noch Zuschauer), Güntensperger, Fabinho, Barberis (verletzt), Kreuzer, Cravero (geschont), Rytschkow (immer noch verschollen) und Matan (nicht im Aufgebot).

3 July 1999 Sempione-Cup; 3rd place match	Basel (Switzerland)	0–3	(Croatia) Dinamo Zagreb	Moos, Balsthal
19:00		FCB summary	69' (0:1) Šokota; 70' (0:2) Mikulėnas; 81' (0:3) Mujcin	Attendance: 2,500; Referee: (Switzerland) Urs Meier (Wettingen and Würenlos)
Note: The Sempione Cup was a club tournament played in summer at Sportanlage Moos, Balsthal, during the years 1987 to 2004. FCB fielded Moroccan test player Abdelkarim Jinani; Zagreb were without Prosinecki (injured). Fair game, no bookings. 41st minute: a shot from Zagreb's player Bazina hit the post. Corners: 5–2 (3–1). FCB fielded their reserve squad due to a UIC match on Sunday. Dinamo's official club name at the time: Croatia Zagreb.

17 August 1999 Mid-seaso; Exhibition game	SV Muttenz (Switzerland)	1–3	(Switzerland) Basel	Margelacker, Muttenz
	Küpfe (yellow card) 76'; Cecere 83' (1:3)	FCB summary	8' (0:1) Fabinho; (yellow card) 42' Bedzigui; 43' (0:2) Dobrovoljski; 47' (0:3) Bedzigui	Attendance: 400; Referee: (Switzerland) Jürg Burkhart
Note: Muttenz without Karrer, Weiser, and Schreiber (all injured). FCB played mainly with the players who had not had many appearances and with a number of youth players. Sahin moved to central defense after Colina was substituted in.

7 September 1999 Mid-season; Exhibition game	Baden (Switzerland)	5–2	(Switzerland) Basel	Esp Stadium, Fislisbach
17:00	Lüthi 15' (1:0); Berardi (yellow card) 26'; Lüthi 43' (2:2); Dnibi (yellow card) 52'; Fiechter 65' (3:2); Lelis 67' (4:2); Ramondetta 70' (5:2)	FCB summary	30' (1:1) Kreuzer; 32' (1:2) Sahin; (yellow card) 64' (yellow-red card) 72' Cravero	Attendance: 450; Referee: (Switzerland) René Rogalla (Wallisellen)
Note: FCB without Zuberbühler (national team), Quennoz, Kehrli, Tschopp (U-21 national team), Fabinho (recovering from injury), and Güntensperger (who resumed team training that week following a cruciate ligament tear). 3rd minute: a shot from Schmidt hit the crossbar. 63rd minute: a header from Koumantarakis hit the post.

28 September 1999 Mid-season; Exhibition game	Old Boys (Switzerland)	0–6	(Switzerland) Basel	Stadion Schützenmatte, Basel
19:00	Vujasinovic (yellow card) 79'	FCB summary	1' (0:1) Kehrli; 29' (0:2) Cetin Güner; 38' (0:3) Huggel; 41' (0:4) Tholot; 42' (0:5) Tholot; 44' (0:6) Kehrli	Attendance: 500; Referee: (Switzerland) Jürg Burkhart
Note: FCB without various regular players who were rested. 20th minute a shot from Güner hit the post. 21st minute, a shot from Güner bounced off the crossbar. Erich Vogel (former sports director of GC) in the stands. Corners: 3:3 (0:1).

13 October 1999 Mid-season; Exhibition game	Concordia Basel (Switzerland)	0–5	(Switzerland) Basel	Stadion Schützenmatte, Basel
		FCB summary	5' (0:1) Cantaluppi; 26' (0:2) Cantaluppi; 54' (0:3) Güner; 81' (0:4) Kreuzer; 88' (0:5) Barberis	Attendance: 350; Referee: (Switzerland) Claudio Circhetta (Muttenz)
Note: Concordia without Oezcan, Ramseier, Akbas (all injured) and Dapoto (ill).

30 November 1999 Mid season Exhibition game	SC Dornach (Switzerland)	0–1	(Switzerland) Basel	Gigersloch, Dornach
19:00		FCB summary	(penalty missed) 4′ Güner; 35' (0:1) Pérez	Attendance: 80; Referee: (Switzerland) Claudio Circhetta
Note: Dornach were without Rudin, Magro, Licciardello, Immeli, and Frei (all injured), as well as Di Pasqua, Henzi, Meli, Menditto, and Becirewic (all absent). FCB without Fabinho, Ceccaroni, and Tholot (all injured), plus unused players Zuberbühler, Kreuzer, Koumantarakis, Barberis, Savic, Huggel, Cantaluppi, and Knez. Frozen, bumpy pitch. 4th minute: Dornach goalkeeper Furler saved the penalty-kick from Güner.

==== Winter break ====
18 January 2000 Winter break Exhibition game	Baden (Switzerland)	2–0	(Switzerland) Basel	Esp Stadium, Fislisbach
18:00	Stephan LüthiLüthi 41' (pen.); Oldani 54' (2:0); Berger (yellow card) 73'; Mehmeti (yellow card) 79'	FCB summary		Attendance: 325; Referee: (Switzerland) René Rogalla (Wallisellen)
Note: Baden without Rolando (no residence permit) and Zmoos (injured). Basel without Koumantarakis, Güner, Tschopp, and Güntensperger (all injured), and Zuberbühler, Savic, Cravero, and Barberis (all rested). 85th minute: Kehrli left the pitch with a muscle problem. Murat Yakin, Erich Vogel, and Köbi Kuhn (U-21 national team coach) in the stands.

22 January 2000 Winter break Exhibition game	Grenchen (Switzerland)	1–2	(Switzerland) Basel	Stadion Brühl, Grenchen
14:30	Becker 3' (1:0)	FCB summary	15' (1:1) Tholot; (yellow card) 57' Arslan; 90' (1:2) Tholot	Attendance: 100; Referee: (Switzerland) Daniel Gilliand
Note: Grenchen without Fischer, Lanz, Della Casa, and Fluri (absent). Basel without Güner, Güntensperger, Fabinho, Tschopp, and Koumantarakis (all injured), as well as Kreuzer, Knez, and Cantaluppi (all rested). Basel tested with U-21 players Ahmet Arslan (who later moved to Concordia Basel) and Simeon Bedzigui (who later moved to FC Schötz)

29 January 2000 Winter break Exhibition game	SC Freiburg (Germany)	4–0	(Switzerland) Basel	Dreisamstadion, Freiburg
19:30	Kobiashvili 3' (1:0); Iashvili 47' (2:0); Ben Slimane 54' (3:0); Iashvili 74' (4:0)	FCB summary	(yellow card) 14' Ceccaroni; (yellow card) 68' Savić	Attendance: 2,500; Referee: (Germany) Markus Schmidt
Note: Freiburg without missing Baya, Sellimi (with Tunisia at the Africa Cup), Günes, Korell, Tsikitshvili, and Schumann (all injured). Basel was without Koumantarakis, Tschopp (recovering), Güner, and Güntensperger (injured). Tactical change FCB, after the break, Häberli played up front alongside Kehrli, with Barberis moving to right midfield and Huggel to the center. 68th minute Tactical change, Barberis moved to left midfield following Savic's substitution, with Colina shifting to the right side.

2 February 2000 Winter break	Karlsruher SC (Germany)	1–2	(Switzerland) Basel	Waldsportplatz, Renchen
18:00	da Silva (yellow card) 50'; Edman (yellow card) 57'; Lakies 82' (1:2)	FCB summary	36' (0:1) Calapes; 62' (0:2) Kreuzer	Attendance: 800; Referee: (Germany) Bernhard Zerr
Note: Karlsruhe at full strength. FCB without Koumantarakis, Tschopp (recovering), Güntensperger (injured), and Cravero (military service).

5 February 2000 Winter break	Bellinzona (Switzerland)	2–2	(Switzerland) Basel	Campo Sportivo, Carasso, Bellinzona
14:30	Oscar TatoTato 24' (1:0); Miccolis (yellow card) 41'; Lustrinelli 43' (2:1); Martin (yellow card) 83'	FCB summary	34' (1:1) Tholot; 88' (2:2) Cravero	Attendance: 900; Referee: (Switzerland) Reto Rutz (Amriswil)
Note: Bellinzona without Türkyilmaz (who was ill); FCB without Güner, Tschopp, Koumantarakis, Güntensperger, Fabinho (injured), and Kreuzer (rested). 44th minute: a shot from Tholot hit the crossbar.

10 February 2000 Trainings camp	Basel (Switzerland)	1–0	(Ukraine) Metalist Kharkiv	Wingate Institute, Netanya, Israel
17:30	Koumantarakis 38' (1:0)	FCB summary		Attendance: 15; Referee: (Russia) Alex Schterngel
Note: FCB without Zuberbühler, Quennoz (unused substitute), and Tschopp (in rehabilitation training), as well as injured players who did not travel to the training camp (Güner, Güntensperger, Fabinho). No substitutions for Kharkiv. 80th minute: a header from Kreuzer hit the crossbar. 46th minute, Häberli was forced off with a calf contusion.

13 February 2000 Trainings camp	Lokomotiv Moscow (Russia)	3–2	(Switzerland) Basel	Haifa, Israel
	Ewsewew 5' (1:0); Bulykin 20' (2:0); Teryokhin 49' (3:0); Sarkisyan (yellow card) 85'	FCB summary	51' (pen. 3:1) Kreuzer; 69' (3:2) Kehrli	Attendance: 20; Referee: (Russia) Alex Schterngel
Note: FCB without Tschopp (in advanced training), Stöckli (not used), Yakin (inflammation of the little left toe), Güntensperger, Güner, Fabinho (did not travel to the training camp). FCB with tactival changes, after the substitution, Knez' Quennoz right full-back, after the substitution Häberlis Barberis on the left in midfield.

20 February 2000 Winter break	Basel (Switzerland)	0–2	(Switzerland) SR Delémont	Im Nau, Laufen
14:30	Yakin (yellow card) 79'	FCB summary	57' (0:1) Fabinho; (yellow card) 57' Froidevaux; 80' (0:2) Shereni	Attendance: 804; Referee: (Switzerland) Andreas Schluchter (Schönenbuch)
Note: FCB without Zuberbühler, Cantaluppi (national team), Savic (U-21), Güner, Tschopp, and Güntensperger (all injured). Delémont were without Drakopoulos, Vernier (both injured), and Klötzli (ill).

26 February 2000 Winter break	Aarau (Switzerland)	1–3	(Switzerland) Basel	Stadion Brügglifeld, Aarau
14:30	Senn 90' (1:3)	FCB summary	72' (0:1) Calapes; 76' (0:2) Tholot; 79' (0:3) Kehrli	Attendance: 800; Referee: (Switzerland) Markus Nobs, (Wohlen)
Note: FCA without Aleksandrov, Baldassarri, Wiederkehr, and Donatiello (injured). FCB without Güner, Tschopp, and Güntensperger (injured); Cantaluppi, Häberli, and Cravero (rested). Kehrli in left midfield from the 62nd minute.

7 March 2000 Winter break	Basel (Switzerland)	3–2	(Switzerland) Concordia Basel	Stadion Rankhof, Basel
	Batista; Batista; Kehrli	FCB summary	Brogno; Busetti	Attendance: 0
Note: Played behind closed doors. FCB with test player Everson Batista from Borussia Dortmund.

18 April 2000 Mid-season	Basel (Switzerland)	1–0	(Switzerland) Wangen bei Olten	Stadion Rankhof, Basel
19:00	Cantaluppi 65' (1:0)	FCB summary		Attendance: 200; Referee: (Switzerland) Andreas Schluchter (Schönenbuch)
Note: FCB without Ceccaroni, Yakin, Knez, and Calapes (all injured). The remaining regular starters were rested. After Pferzel came on, Savic played in midfield.

2 May 2000 Mid-season	Basel (Switzerland)	2–0	(Switzerland) Concordia Basel	Stadion Rankhof, Basel
19:30	Güner 78' (1:0); Aziawonou 86' (2:0)	FCB summary		Attendance: 300; Referee: (Switzerland) Jürg Burkhart
Note: Concordia competed with goalkeepers Rutz and Rapic (both FC Basel). Basel with Yao Aziawonou

16 May 2000 Mid-season	FC Schönbühl (Switzerland)	0–4	(Switzerland) Basel	Sportplatz Sand West, Schönbühl
19:00		FCB summary	3' (0:1) Sawu; 16' (0:2) Kehrli; 43' (0:3) Quennoz; 60' (0:4) Calapes	Attendance: 1,300; Referee: (Switzerland) Markus Nobs (Wohlen bei Bern)
Note: Schönbühl at full strength. FCB without Zuberbühler, Ceccaroni, Kreuzer, Cravero, Knez, Koumantarakis, Barberis, Savic, Cantaluppi, Tholot, and Yakin (all rested).

=== Nationalliga A ===
==== Qualifying phase ====
The first stage of the NLA began on 7 July 1999 and was completed on 12 December. The top eight teams in the qualification phase would advance to the championship group and the last four teams would play against relegation.

7 July 1999 Round 1	Lugano	1–1	Basel	Cornaredo, Lugano
19:30	Rossi (yellow card) 29'; Rossi (penalty missed) 57′ Magnin 90' (1:1)	FCB summary	12' (0:1) Kreuzer; (yellow card) 25' Koumantarakis; (red card) 33' Kreuzer	Attendance: 5,100; Referee: (Switzerland) Dieter Schoch (Attiswil)
Note: Lugano were without Gimenez and Tejeda (both injured), Inguscio (not yet eligible), and Gaspoz, Bastida, and Moresi (all left out of the squad). FCB without Calapes, Fabinho, and Güntensperger (all injured) and Rytschkow (on holiday). 18th minute: a shot from N'Kufo hit the crossbar. 28th minute: Hürzeler leaves the game with a concussion and a laceration. 38th minute: a shot from Koumantarakis hit the crossbar. 47th minute: a header from Rossi hit the post. 50th minute: FCB goalkeeper Zuberbühler leaves the game with a head laceration. 56th minute: a direct free kick from Hoy bounced back off the post. 57th minute: FCB substitute goalkeeper Stöckli saved the penalty taken by Rossi following a foul. Barberis plays left-back after coming on; Cravero plays in central defense. Corners: 7–4 (3–2).

14 July 1999 Round 2	Basel	1–1	Xamax	Stadion Schützenmatte, Basel
19:30	Tholot (penalty missed) 17′ Tholot 35' (1:0); Savić (yellow card) 80'	FCB summary	(yellow card) 68' Wittl; (yellow card) 81' Sansoni; 90+2' (1:1) Bieli	Attendance: 8,679; Referee: (Switzerland) Massimo Busacca
Note: FCB without Kreuzer (suspended), Güner, Calapes, Fabinho, and Güntensperger (all injured). Xamax without Corminboeuf, Alicarte, Moret, Martinovic, and Gämperle (all injured). 17th minute: Xamax goalkeeper Delay held the penalty taken by Tholot following a foul. Swiss national team head coach Gilbert Gress amongst the spectators.

17 July 1999 Round 3	Yverdon-Sports	P–P	Basel	Stade Municipal, Yverdon
		[ Summary]
Note: Match was originally scheduled for 17 July, but after postponement rescheduled to 10 August.

21 July 1999 Round 4	Basel	1–1	Grasshopper Club	Stadion Schützenmatte, Basel
19:30	Güner (yellow card) 17'; Cravero 36' (1:0); Knez (yellow card) 70'; Kreuzer (yellow card) 76'	FCB summary	(yellow card) 22' Cabanas; 74' (1:1) (yellow card) 89' de Napoli	Attendance: 8,431; Referee: (Liechtenstein) Roland Beck (Triesenberg)
Note: FCB without Calapes, Güntensperger, and Fabinho (all injured). Comeback for the Russian Alexander Rychkov. Perez not in the squad. GC without Huber, Walker, Smiljanic, and Berner (all injured). 67th minute: FCB goalkeeper Zuberbühler deflects a header from Hodel against the inside of the post.

24 July 1999 Round 5	St. Gallen	P–P	Basel	Espenmoos, St. Gallen
		[ Summary]
Note: Match was originally scheduled for 24 July, but after postponement rescheduled to 24 August.

31 July 1999 Round 6	Basel	3–0	SR Delémont	Stadion Schützenmatte, Basel
17:30	Tholot 6' (1:0); Tholot 42' (2:0); Kreuzer 76' (3:0); Cravero (yellow card) 83'	FCB summary	(yellow card) 6' Fabinho; (red card) 21' Tanielton	Attendance: 7,535; Referee: (Switzerland) Philippe Leuba (Chexbres)
Note: FCB without Rytschkow, Fabinho, Calapes, and Güntensperger (all injured). Delémont without Froidevaux (injured) and Ndlovu (with Zimbabwe at the Africa Cup).

5 August 1999 Round 7	Servette	1–1	Basel	Charmilles Stadium, Geneva
20:00	Koumantarakis 12' (1:0); Kreuzer (yellow card) 51'; Barberis (yellow card) 65'; Cantaluppi (yellow card) 83'; Sahin (yellow card) 90'	FCB summary	Jeanneret (yellow card) 26'; 81' (1:1) Thurre	Attendance: 6,142; Referee: (Switzerland) Carlo Bertolini (Vira-Gambarogno)
Note: Servette without Fournier, Ippoliti, and Siljak (all injured). FCB without Fabinho, Güntensperger, Kehrli, and Rytschkow (all injured).

10 August 1999 Round 3	Yverdon-Sports	0–1	Basel	Stade Municipal, Yverdon
19:30	Peço (yellow card) 50'; Abedi (Gonçalves) (yellow card) 67'; Diogo (yellow card) 88'	FCB summary	(yellow card) 16' Kreuzer; 31' (0:1) Tholot; (yellow card) 33' Savić; (yellow card) 41'Koumantarakis	Attendance: 5,100; Referee: (Switzerland) Marcel Vollenweider (Rüti, Zürich)
Note: Match was originally scheduled for 17 July 1999, but after postponement rescheduled. Yverdon without Jenny (suspended), Gilson and Devolz (both injured) and without Ebe (contract termination due to integration problems). FCB without Cravero (ill), Güntensperger, Fabinho and Rytschkow (all injured).

15 August 1999 Round 8	Basel	2–0	Luzern	Stadion Schützenmatte, Basel
16:15	Tholot (yellow card) 39'; Koumantarakis 43' (1:0); Kehrli (yellow card) 45'; Güner (yellow card) 55'; Kreuzer (yellow card) 67'; Huggel 81' (2:0)	FCB summary	(yellow card) 43' A. Frei; (yellow card) 73' Arnold	Attendance: 7,850; Referee: (Switzerland) Urs Meier (Wettingen and Würenlos)
Note: FCB without Güntensperger, Fabinho, and Perez (all injured), Cravero (was ill), and Rytschkow (failed to report for duty). FCL without Lipawsky (suspended), Patrick Schnarwiler, Kottmann, Lehmann, Gian, and Sander (all injured), and Dilaver (no work permit). 38th minute: FCL player Amarildo left the pitch with a suspected broken ankle and was taken to hospital; Trninic moved to defense. 45th minute: a direct free kick from Wyss hit the post..

21 August 1999 Round 9	Lausanne-Sport	1–0	Basel	Olympique de la Pontaise, Lausanne
19:30	Mazzoni 21' (1:0)	FCB summary	(yellow card) 17' Knez; (yellow card) 60' Ceccaroni	Attendance: 5,700; Referee: (Switzerland) Nicole Petignat (Courgenay)
Note: Lausanne without Eduardo Magnin (injured). FCB without Kreuzer (suspended), Güntensperger, Koumantarakis, Perez, and Fabinho (all injured). 34th minute: a shot from Ohrel hit the post.

24 August 1999 Round 5	St. Gallen	1–1	Basel	Espenmoos, St. Gallen
19:30	Hellinga (yellow card) 32'; Winkler (yellow card) 57'; Contini (yellow card) 78'; Jairo (yellow card) 88'; Amoah 90+4' (1:1)	FCB summary	(yellow card) 25' Tschopp; (yellow card) 27' Huggel; 90+1' (0:1) Knez; (yellow card) 90+4' Kreuzer	Attendance: 11.600; Referee: (Switzerland) René Rogalla (Wallisellen)
Note: Match was originally scheduled for 24 July, but after postponement rescheduled. St. Gallen without Eugster, Neri, Pinnelli, and Zinna (all injured). FCB without Güntensperger, Koumantarakis, and Perez (all injured).

29 August 1999 Round 10	Basel	0–0	Zürich	Stadion Schützenmatte, Basel
16:15	Güner (yellow card) 57'	Summary; FCZ summary	(yellow card) 11' Eydelie; (yellow card) 34' Stocklasa; (yellow card) 45' Fischer	Attendance: 11,750; Referee: (Switzerland) Reto Rutz (Amriswil)
Note: FCB without Güntensperger, Fabinho, and Perez (all injured). FCZ without Giannini (suspended), Opango (Long-term injury) Del Signore (injured).

11 September 1999 Round 11	Aarau	1–3	Basel	Stadion Brügglifeld, Aarau
19:30	Baldassarri (yellow card) 60'; Wojciechowski 81' (1:2)	FCB summary [https://www.arowa.ch/index.php?page=spiel&sid=2489FCA summary	8' (0:1) Huggel; (yellow card) 15' Tholot; 71' (0:2) Cantaluppi; 87' (1:3) Savić	Attendance: 5,800; Referee: (Switzerland) Markus Nobs (Wohlen bei Bern)
Note: FCA without Aleksandrov, Bader, Eggimann, and Senn (all injured). FCB without Perez, Fabinho, and Güntensperger (all injured).

18 September 1999 Round 12	Basel	1–0	Lugano	Stadion Schützenmatte, Basel
16:30	Huggel (yellow card) 13'; Barberis 32' (1:0); Calapes (yellow card) 58'; Knez (yellow card) 77'; Tholot (yellow card) 85'	FCB summary	(yellow card) 27' (yellow-red card) 59' Barea	Attendance: 6,950; Referee: (Switzerland) Urs Meier (Wettingen and Würenlos)
Note: FCB without Fabinho, Güntensperger, and Perez (all injured). Lugano without Hoy and Shakpoke (both suspended), N'Kufo (was ill), and Bastida, Lombardo, Rossi, and Tejeda (all injured). 32nd minute: Kreuzer left the pitch injured. 67th minute: a shot from Koumantarakis hit the crossbar. 87th minute, Joël Magnin's equaliser was denied due to Mohamed Kader's offside position.

23 September 1999 Round 13	Xamax	1–2	Basel	Stade de la Maladière (1924), Neuchâtel
19:30	Delay (yellow card) 54'; Moret (yellow card) 69'; Bieli 90+3' (1:2)	FCB summary	51' (0:1) Tholot; 70' (0:2) Tschopp; (yellow card) 87' Calapes	Attendance: 6,200; Referee: (Switzerland) Dominique Tavel (Lonay)
Note: Xamax without Gigon and Wittl (both suspended); Alicarte, Corminboeuf, Koch, Gämperle, Boughanem, and Bochud (all injured). FCB without Knez (suspended), Sahin (absent), Perez, and Fabinho (both injured).

2 October 1999 Round 14	Basel	1–2	Yverdon-Sports	Stadion Schützenmatte, Basel
19:30	Cantaluppi (yellow card) 13'; Koumantarakis 87' (1:2)	FCB summary	(yellow card) 29' Biaggi; (yellow card) 34' Adoazinho; (yellow card) 36' Jenny; 69' (0:1) Tchouga; (yellow card) 76' Friedli; 85' (0:2) Tchouga	Attendance: 9,250; Referee: (Switzerland) Claude Detruche (Thônex)
Note: FCB without Fabinho, Güntensperger, and Perez (all injured). Yverdon without Fasel (suspended), Gilson, and Renatus (both injured).Swiss national team head coach Gilbert Gress, together with Roy Hodgson and Erich Vogel in the stands, amongst the spectators.

17 October 1999 Round 15	Grasshopper Club	1–1	Basel	Hardturm, Zürich
16:15	Sermeter (yellow card) 25'; Ekoku 72' (1:1)	FCB summary	3' (0:1) Kreuzer; (yellow card) 21' Knez; (yellow card) 44' Huggel; (yellow card) 67' Savić	Attendance: 10,700; Referee: (Switzerland) Dieter Schoch (Attiswil)
Note: GC without Cabanas (suspended), Huber, Gren, Lövvik, Zanni, and Berner (all injured). FCB without Perez and Fabinho (both injured). 64th minute: a goal from Chapuisat was disallowed for an alleged foul. 85th minute: a header from Sermeter hit the post. Swiss national team head-coach Gilbert Gress together with Leverkusen coach Christoph Daum in the stands, amongst the spectators.

24 October 1999 Round 16	Basel	4–1	St. Gallen	Stadion Schützenmatte, Basel
16:05	Koumantarakis 35' (1:0); Kreuzer 47' (2:0); Koumantarakis 63' (3:0); Koumantarakis 70' (4:0); Güntensperger (yellow card) 80'	FCB summary	(yellow card) 30' Müller; (yellow card) 37' Mazzarelli; 78' (4:1) Amoah; (yellow card) 84' Helinga; (yellow card) 84' Zellweger	Attendance: 7,861; Referee: (Switzerland) Guido Wildhaber (Kerzers)
Note: FCB without Perez and Fabinho (both injured) and Güner (was ill). St. Gallen without Zinna (injured). This was Sébastien Barberis's 200th NLA match.

31 October 1999 Round 17	SR Delémont	2–2	Basel	La Blancherie, Delémont
14:30	Fabinho 10' (1:1); Rytchkov 17' (pen. 2:1); Fabinho (yellow card) 19'; Rytchkov (yellow card) 33'; Hushi (yellow card) 90'	FCB summary	8' (0:1) Huggel; (yellow card) 9' Kreuzer; (penalty missed) 16′ Koumantarakis; (yellow card) 17' Knez; (yellow card) 24' Cantaluppi; 61' (2:2) Kreuzer	Attendance: 6,200; Referee: (Switzerland) Massimo Busacca (Monte Carasso/Bellinzona)
Note: Delémont without Bui (suspended). FCB without Perez and Fabinho (both injured). 16th minute, Delémont goalkeeper Inguscio fends off the foul penalty from Koumantarakis which flew back into play. 28th minute, a goal from Tholot was disallowed for offside.

7 November 1999 Round 18	Basel	0–0	Servette	Stadion Schützenmatte, Basel
17:30	Quennoz (yellow card) 16'; Cravero (yellow card) 58'	FCB summary	(yellow card) 50' Vurens; (yellow card) 51' Ouadja; (yellow card) 79' Vanetta	Attendance: 6,535; Referee: (Switzerland) René Rogalla (Wallisellen)
Note: FCB ohne Cantaluppi (gesperrt), Ceccaroni, Savic und Fabinho (verletzt). Servette ohne Di Zenzo (gesperrt), Fournier, Siljak und Ippoliti (alle verletzt).

21 November 1999 Round 19	Luzern	3–0	Basel	Stadion Allmend, Luzern
14:30	A. Frei 34' (1:0); Türkyılmaz 52' (2:0); A. Frei 62' (3:0)	FCB summary	(yellow card) 16' Cravero; (yellow card) 61' Knez; (yellow card) 79' Cantaluppi	Attendance: 8,845; Referee: (Switzerland) Marcel Vollenweider (Rüti, Zürich)
Note: FCL without Arnold (suspended), Amarildo, Lehmann, and Schnarwiler (all injured). FCBl without Ceccaroni and Fabinho (both injured).

27 November 1999 Round 20	Basel	3–3	Lausanne-Sport	Stadion Schützenmatte, Basel
17:30	Cravero 10' (1:0); Koumantarakis 15' (2:0); Cantaluppi (yellow card) 76'; Kreuzer 78' (3:3)	FCB summary	27' (2:1) Gerber; 36' (2:2) Rehn; 39' (pen. 2:3) Diogo; (yellow card) 74' Horjak; (yellow card) 80' Christ; (red card) 81' Kuźba	Attendance: 5,203; Referee: (Switzerland) Nicole Petignat (Courgenay)
Note: FCB without Ceccaroni, Tholot, and Fabinho (all injured). Lausanne without Celestini, Magnin, and Gomes (injured).

5 December 1999 Round 21	Zürich	0–1	Basel	Letzigrund, Zürich
14:30	Stocklasa (yellow card) 22'; Eydelie (yellow card) 36'	FCB summary FCZ summary	27' (0:1) Koumantarakis; (yellow card) 53' Tschopp	Attendance: 6,600; Referee: (Liechtenstein) Roland Beck (Triesenberg)
Note: FCZ without Opango (long term injury), Del Signore, Chassot, Djordjevic and Kawelaschwili (all injured) as well as Giannini (ill, flu). Basel without Ceccaroni, Tholot, and Fabinho (all injured) as well as Perez and Calapes (both ill). 25th minute: a goal from Sant'Anna was disallowed for offside.

12 December 1999 Round 22	Basel	2–1	Aarau	Stadion Schützenmatte, Basel
14:30	Cantaluppi 8' (1:0); Knez (yellow card) 60'; Kreuzer 79' (pen. 2:1)	FCB summary FCA summary	21' (1:1) Skrzypczak; (yellow card) 63' Tarone; (red card) 78' Studer; (yellow card) 82' Baudry; (yellow card) 90+2' Pavličević	Attendance: 6,900; Referee: (Switzerland) Carlo Bertolini (Vira-Gambarogno)
Note: FCB without Ceccaroni, Tholot, and Fabinho (all injured). FCA without Wiederkehr, Aleksandrov, Bader, and Traoré (all injured), as well as Ivanov (suspended). Gale-force winds throughout the entire match.

==== Qualification table ====
Pos	Team	Pld	W	D	L	GF	GA	GD	Pts	Qualification
1	St. Gallen	22	13	6	3	42	25	+17	45	Advance to championship round halved points (rounded up) as bonus
2	Basel	22	9	10	3	31	21	+10	37	Advance to championship round halved points (rounded up) as bonus
3	Lausanne-Sport	22	9	9	4	35	25	+10	36	Advance to championship round halved points (rounded up) as bonus
4	Grasshopper Club	22	9	7	6	40	25	+15	34	Advance to championship round halved points (rounded up) as bonus
5	Yverdon-Sports	22	7	9	6	28	25	+3	30	Advance to championship round halved points (rounded up) as bonus
6	Xamax	22	7	7	8	34	33	+1	28	Advance to championship round halved points (rounded up) as bonus
7	Luzern	22	8	4	10	28	29	−1	28	Advance to championship round halved points (rounded up) as bonus
8	Servette	22	8	4	10	32	36	−4	28	Advance to championship round halved points (rounded up) as bonus
9	Zürich	22	6	8	8	21	29	−8	26	Continue to promotion/relegation round
10	Aarau	22	7	5	10	30	42	−12	26	Continue to promotion/relegation round
11	Lugano	22	5	6	11	27	34	−7	21	Continue to promotion/relegation round
12	SR Delémont	22	4	5	13	24	48	−24	17	Continue to promotion/relegation round

Source: rsssf.com

==== Championship group ====
The first eight teams of the Qualification phase competed in the Championship Playoff Round. They took half of the points (rounded up to complete units) gained in the Qualification as Bonus with them. This phase began on 12 March 2000 and was completed on 7 June.

12 March 2000 Round 1	Lausanne-Sport	0–0	Basel	Olympique de la Pontaise, Lausanne
16:15	Puce (yellow card) 62'	FCB summary	(yellow card) 17' Tholot; (yellow card) 88' M. Yakin	Attendance: 6,000; Referee: (Switzerland) Carlo Bertolini (Vira-Gambarogno)
Note: Lausanne without Horjak (injured); FCB without Knez (suspended), Güner, Güntensperger, Stöckli, and Tschopp (all injured). 84th minute: Yakin hit the post with a direct free-kick.

19 March 2000 Round 2	Basel	2–2	Grasshopper Club	Stadion Schützenmatte, Basel
16:15	Savić 23' (1:0); Savić (yellow card) 26'; Huggel (yellow card) 19' (yellow-red card) 35'; Cantaluppi 82' (2:2)	FCB summary	(yellow card) 18' Gren; 47' (1:1) Tikva; 51' (1:2) Chapuisat; (yellow card) 63' Smiljanić	Attendance: 6,600; Referee: (Switzerland) Reto Rutz (Amriswil)
Note: FCB without Knez, Tholot (both suspended), Güner, Güntensperger, Tschopp, Stöckli, and Calapes (all injured). GC without Esposito and Berner (both injured).

26 March 2000 Round 3	Luzern	3–2	Basel	Stadion Allmend, Luzern
16:15	Sander 37' (1:1); Blunschi (yellow card) 66'; A. Frei 69' (2:2); Branca 87' (3:2)	FCB summary	31' (0:1) Koumantarakis; 64' (1:2) Kreuzer; (yellow card) 85' Ceccaroni	Attendance: 9,132; Referee: (Switzerland) Philippe Leuba (Chexbres)
Note: FCL without Guido Schnarwiler, Trninic, Amarildo and Spycher (all injured) and Enrique (not in the squad). FCB without Savic and Huggel (both suspended) as well as Güntensperger, Güner and Cravero (all injured). 73th minute, a goal from Yakin was disallowed because of an offside position.

1 April 2000 Round 4	Basel	1–0	Servette	Stadion Schützenmatte, Basel
19:30	Koumantarakis 69' (1:0); Tholot (yellow card) 74'; M. Yakin (yellow card) 83'	FCB summary	(yellow card) 10' Wolf; (red card) 70' El Brazi	Attendance: 6,120; Referee: (Switzerland) Marcel Vollenweider (Rüti, Zürich)
Note: FCB without Güner, Güntensperger, Cravero, and Calapes (all injured). Servette without Varela (suspended), Fournier, Thurre, Bah, and Ippoliti (all injured).

7 April 2000 Round 5	St. Gallen	1–1	Basel	Espenmoos, St. Gallen
20:15	Winkler (yellow card) 19'; Gane 43' (1:1)	FCB sumarry	17' (0:1) Barberis; (yellow card) 20' M. Yakin; (yellow card) 44' Knez; (yellow card) 76' Kreuzer; (yellow card) 85' Barberis; (yellow card) 89' Cantaluppi	Attendance: 11,300; Referee: (Switzerland) René Rogalla (Wallisellen)
Note: St. Gallen at full strength. FCB without Ceccaroni, Calapes, Cravero, Güner, and Güntensperger (all injured). 90th minute: a headed goal from Kreuzer was disallowed for a foul.

15 April 2000 Round 6	Basel	2–0	Yverdon-Sports	Stadion Schützenmatte, Basel
19:30	Koumantarakis 3' (1:0); Quennoz (yellow card) 7'; Cantaluppi (yellow card) 24'; Kreuzer 37' (pen. 2:0); Kreuzer (yellow card) 30' (yellow-red card) 58'	FCB summary	(yellow card) 38' Jenny; (penalty missed) 58′ Renfer	Attendance: 6,334; Referee: (Switzerland) Nicole Petignat (Courgenay)
Note: FCB without Ceccaroni, Calapes, Knez, Murat Yakin, and Güntensperger (all injured). Yverdon without Gilson and Favre. 58th minute: Renfer shot the penalty kick wide of the goal, that was awarded for the foul from Kreuzer.

22 April 2000 Round 7	Basel	1–1	Xamax	Stadion Schützenmatte, Basel
19:30	Huggel 90+1' (1:1)	FCB summary	(yellow card) 38' Boughanem; 66' (0:1) Bieli; (yellow card) 85' Bieli	Attendance: 7,273; Referee: (Switzerland) Markus Nobs (Wohlen bei Bern)
Note: FCB without Cantaluppi and Kreuzer (both suspended), and Ceccaroni and Güntensperger (both injured). Xamax without Corminboeuf, Delay, Gämperle, and Simo (all injured), and Camara (World Cup qualifying with Senegal). 6th minute: a shot from Kehrli hit the angle of the crossbar and post. 86th minute: a shot from Bühler hit the inside of the post.

29 April 2000 Round 8	Xamax	1–2	Basel	Stade de la Maladière (1924), Neuchâtel
19:30	Simo (yellow card) 25'; Sène (yellow card) 81'; Bieli 90+4' (pen. 1:2)	FCB summary	(yellow card) 2' Savić; 29' (0:1) Koumantarakis; 82' (pen. 0:2) M. Yakin; (yellow card) 90+3' Tschopp	Attendance: 6,700; Referee: (Switzerland) Philippe Leuba (Chexbres)
Note: Xamax without Corminboeuf, Delay, and Gämperle (all injured). FCB without Kreuzer and Cantaluppi (both suspended), and Güner and Güntensperger (both injured).

7 May 2000 Round 9	Yverdon-Sports	0–1	Basel	Stade Municipal, Yverdon
14:30	Cavalho (yellow card) 74'; Rochat (red card) 69'	FCB summary	3' (0:1) Koumantarakis; (yellow card) 54' Huggel; (yellow card) 59' Häberli	Attendance: 3,212; Referee: (Switzerland) Urs Meier (Wettingen and Würenlos)
Note: Yverdon without Biaggi (suspended), Flückiger, Gilson, Nenzao, and Renfer (all injured). FCB without Tschopp (suspended), Barberis, Güntensperger, and Kehrli (all injured). NLA debut for Yverdon goalkeeper Mirsad Dedić (Bosnia).

12 May 2000 Round 10	Basel	3–1	St. Gallen	Stadion Schützenmatte, Basel
20:15	Tholot 7' (1:0); Savić 20' (2:1); Cantaluppi (yellow card) 55'; Tholot 57' (3:1); Kehrli (yellow card) 77'	FCB summary	17' (1:1) Amoah; (yellow card) 32' Mazzarelli; (yellow card) 49' Jairo; (yellow card) 66' Müller	Attendance: 10,550; Referee: (Switzerland) Massimo Busacca (Monte Carasso/Bellinzona)
Note: FCB without Huggel (suspended), Barberis, Häberli, and Güntensperger (all injured). St. Gallen without Pinnelli and Zinna (both injured). 44th minute: Contini hits the crossbar. 89th minute: Kreuzer headed the ball against his own crossbar.

21 May 2000 Round 11	Servette	1–1	Basel	Charmilles Stadium, Geneva
16:15	Šiljak 88' (1:1)	FCB summary	26' (0:1) Tholot	Attendance: 3,374; Referee: (Switzerland) Urs Meier (Wettingen and Würenlos)
Note: Servette without Lonfat (suspended), Pédat, Jeanneret, Paolo Diogo, Thurre, and Noriega (all injured), as well as Bah and Di Zenzo (both playing for the youth team). FCB without Barberis, Häberli, and Güntensperger (all injured). Fair game, no yellow cards.

28 May 2000 Round 12	Basel	0–0	Luzern	Stadion Schützenmatte, Basel
14:30		FCB summary	(yellow card) 21' (yellow-red card) 33' Sander	Attendance: 7,500; Referee: (Liechtenstein) Roland Beck (Triesenberg)
Note: FCB without Barberis, Cantaluppi, and Kreuzer (all injured). FCL without Gian and Frei (both suspended) as well as Guido Schnarwiler, Joller, and Silvio (all injured). 45th minute: a shot from Savic grazed the crossbar. 55th minute: a shot from Koumantarakis hit the crossbar.

2 June 2000 Round 13	Grasshopper Club	3–0	Basel	Hardturm, Zürich
20:15	Esposito 13' (1:0); Berner 48' (2:0); Muff 51' (3:0); Cabanas (yellow card) 63'; Esposito (yellow card) 70'	FCB summary	(yellow card) 90+2' Knez; (yellow card) 90+3' M. Yakin	Attendance: 10,900; Referee: (Switzerland) Guido Wildhaber (Kerzers)
Note: GC without Müller and Tararache (both suspended), Ekoku (death in the family) and Tikva (national team) as well as Smiljanic, Isabella, Sermeter, N'Kufo, Zeman and Chapuisat (all injured). FCB without Koumantarakis (with the South African national team) as well as Cravero, Cantaluppi and Barberis (all injured). 31st minute, a header from Knez hit the crossbar. 68th minute a shot from H. Yakin hit the crossbar.

7 June 2000 Round 14	Basel	0–3	Lausanne-Sport	Stadion Schützenmatte, Basel
19:30		FCB summary	33' (0:1) Londono; 51' (0:2) Gerber; (yellow card) 63' Londono; 80' (0:3) Kuźba	Attendance: 7,053; Referee: (Switzerland) Massimo Busacca (Monte Carasso/Bellinzona)
Note: FCB without Yakin (suspended), Koumantarakis (national team), Cravero, Kehrli and Güner (all injured). Lausanne without Celestini, Magnin, Zetzmann (all injured) and Danilevicius (national team).

==== League table ====
Pos	Team	Pld	W	D	L	GF	GA	GD	BP	Pts	Qualification
1	St. Gallen (C)	14	9	4	1	33	14	+19	23	54	Qualification to Champions League third qualifying round
2	Lausanne-Sport	14	8	2	4	22	13	+9	18	44	Qualification to UEFA Cup qualifying round
3	Basel	14	5	6	3	16	16	0	19	40	Qualification to UEFA Cup qualifying round
4	Grasshopper Club	14	5	5	4	30	26	+4	17	37	Qualification to Intertoto Cup first round
5	Luzern	14	5	2	7	17	30	−13	14	31	
6	Servette	14	4	5	5	25	21	+4	14	31	
7	Xamax	14	4	3	7	25	29	−4	14	29	Qualification to Intertoto Cup first round
8	Yverdon-Sports	14	2	1	11	16	35	−19	15	22	

Source: rsssf.com
(C) Champions

=== Swiss Cup ===
The 1999–2000 Swiss Cup was the 75th season of Switzerland's annual football cup competition. It began on 7 August with the first games of Round 1 and ended on 28 May 2000 with the Final held at Wankdorf, Bern. The winners earned a place in the first round of the UEFA Cup. The 12 first-tier clubs from the 1999–2000 Nationalliga A had been granted byes for the first four rounds and they joined the competition in the fifth round. The first-tier teams in round 5 were seeded and cound not be drawn against each other. The draw respected regionalities, when possible, and the lower classed team was granted home advantage.

13 November 1999 Round 5	Mendrisio	1–5	Basel	Centro Sportivo Comunale, Mendrisio
15:30	Di Muro 69' (1:3)	FCB summary	25' (0:1) Koumantarakis; 27' (0:2) Tschopp; (yellow card) 43' Huggel; 55' (0:3) Koumantarakis; 75' (1:4) Koumantarakis; 83' (1:5) Güner	Attendance: 1,200; Referee: (Liechtenstein) Roland Beck (Triesenberg)
Note: FCB without Ceccaroni and Fabinho (both injured). 22nd minute: a shot from Tschopp hit the post.

4 March 2000 Round 5	Basel	1–1 (a.e.t.) (5–4 p)	Grasshopper Club	Stadion Schützenmatte, Basel
20:15	H. Yakin (yellow card) 25'; Kreuzer 37' (pen. 1:0); Koumantarakis (yellow card) 85'; Cravero (yellow card) 98'	FCB summary	(yellow card) 30' Haas; 65' (1:1) Müller; (yellow card) 66' Chapuisat	Attendance: 6,500; Referee: (Switzerland) Urs Meier (Wettingen and Würenlos)
	Penalties
	M. Yakin (penalty scored); Tholot (penalty scored); Kreuzer (penalty scored); Koumantarakis (penalty scored); Huggel (penalty scored)		(penalty scored) Chapuisat; (penalty missed) Müller; (penalty scored) Cabanas; (penalty scored) Tikva; (penalty scored) Hodel
Note: FCB without Tschopp, Güntensperger, Stöckli, and Güner (all injured). GC without Berner (injured) and Tararache (suspended). 23rd minute: a goal from Barberis was disallowed (offside). 90th minute: a goal from Tholot was disallowed (foul by Koumantarakis).

12 April 2000 Quarterfinal	Lausanne-Sport	3–2	Basel	Olympique de la Pontaise, Lausanne
19:30	Magnin (yellow card) 18'; Kuźba 32' (1:0); Gerber 34' (2:0); Kuźba (yellow card) 78'; Gerber 88' (3:2)	FCB summary	50' (2:1) Koumantarakis; (yellow card) 72' M. Yakin; 71' (2:2) N'Tiamoah	Attendance: 2,600; Referee: (Switzerland) Dieter Schoch (Attiswil)
Note: Lausanne without Karlen (suspended) and Ohrel (injured, muscle strain). TCB without Ceccaroni, Güner, Calapes, and Güntensperger (all injured). Tactical change after the break; Yakin in midfield, Cravero in defense.

Zürich won the cup and this was the club's sixth cup title to this date.

=== 1999 UIC ===
60 teams played in this years UEFA Intertoto Cup, which was played in a knock-out format. There were to be three finals after four rounds and all three winners advanced to the UEFA Cup.

First round

20 June 1999 First leg	Korotan Prevalje (Slovenia)	0–0	(Switzerland) Basel	Stadion na Prevaljah, Prevalje
17:00	Benedejcic (yellow card) 4'; Ristic (yellow card) 71'	FCB summary	(yellow card) 69' Cantaluppi; (yellow card) 73' Huggel; (yellow card) 77' Ceccaroni	Attendance: 2,000; Referee: Georgios Kasnaferis (Greece)
Note: Prevalje without Barun (injured); FCB without Cravero and Fabinho (both injured), Huber, Veiga, Rychkov, and Abedi (all absent), as well as Knez, Koumantarakis, and Quennoz (all not yet eligible). 44th minute: a shot from Mendi hit the post. Corners: 5–7 (3–2).

26 June 1999 Second leg	Basel (Switzerland)	6–0 (6–0 agg.)	(Slovenia) Korotan Prevalje	Stadion Schützenmatte, Basel
17:30	Kreuzer 10' (pen. 1:0); Koumantarakis 18' (2:0); Koumantarakis 24' (3:0); Ceccaroni (yellow card) 38'; Koumantarakis 43' (4:0); Cantaluppi 58' (5:0); Koumantarakis 78' (6:0)	FCB summary	(yellow card) (yellow-red card) 32' Vidmar	Attendance: 2,600; Referee: Costas Kapitanis (Cyprus)
Note: FCB without Barberis, Fabinho, Calapes, and Güntensperger (all injured), Savic (was ill), Abedi (lacking match fitness), and Rytchkov (missing).

Basel won 6–0 on aggregate.

Second round

4 July 1999 First leg	Basel (Switzerland)	0–0	(Czech Republic) Boby Brno	Stadion Schützenmatte, Basel
17:30		FCB summary	(yellow card) 75' Zubek; (yellow card) 80' Zbončák	Attendance: 2,600; Referee: Sorin Corpodean (Romania)
Note: FCB without Rytschkow (absent and missing), Fabinho and Güntensperger (both injured). 51st minute: Kreuzer left the game after a kick to the ankle. Corners: 8–5 (5–1).

11 July 1999 Second leg	Boby Brno (Czech Republic)	2–4 (2–4 agg.)	(Switzerland) Basel	Stadion Za Lužánkami, Brno
18:00	Křivánek (yellow card) 9'; Křivánek 19' (1:1); Patrik Holomek (yellow card) 46'; Siegl (yellow card) 50'; Zbončák 51' (2:2); Cihlar (yellow card) 84'	FCB summary	10' (pen. 0:1) Tholot; (yellow card) 24' Güner; 37' (1:2) Cantaluppi; 71' (2:3) Savić; (yellow card) 79' Pérez; 89' (2:4)Kehrli	Attendance: 2,600; Referee: Eduardo Iturralde González (Spain)
Note: FCB without Rytschkow (on holiday), Fabinho, Zuberbühler, Calapes, and Güntensperger (all injured), as well as Sahin (trial at Besiktas Istanbul). Corners: 7–5 (2–3).

Basel won 4–2 on aggregate.

Third round

18 July 1999 First leg	Hamburg (Germany)	0–1	(Switzerland) Basel	Lohmühle, Lübeck
18:00	Hoogma (yellow card) 65'	FCB summary	15' Koumantarakis; (yellow card) 47' Quennoz; (yellow card) 72' Zuberbühler	Attendance: 8,192; Referee: Miroslav Radoman (FR Yugoslavia)
Note: FCB without Calapes, Fabinho, Güntensperger (all injured), Rytschkow (absent), and Cantaluppi (rested); HSV without Doll and Hasinian (both injured).

24 July 1999 Second leg	Basel (Switzerland)	2–3 (3–3 agg.)	(Germany) Hamburg	Stadion Schützenmatte, Basel
16:45	Quennoz (yellow card) 29'; Koumantarakis 50' (1:3); Koumantarakis 57' (2:3); Koumantarakis (yellow card) 84'; Huggel (yellow card) 90+3'	FCB summary	37' (0:1) Fischer; 44' (0:2) Groth; 48' (0:3) Yeboah; (yellow card) 62' Grammozis; (yellow card) 64' Hashemian	Attendance: 3,756; Referee: René Temmink (Netherlands)
Note: FCB without Rytschkow (thigh muscle tightness), Güntensperger, Fabinho, and Calapes (all injured), as well as Savic (rested, not in the squad). HSV is without Panadic (injured) and Cardoso (not in the squad). Bayern coach Ottmar Hitzfeld was in the stands. Basel with tactical change after the third HSV goal in the 48th minute, played a 4-3-3 formation, pushing hard forwards, in attempt for the equaliser.

3–3 on aggregate, Hamburg won on away goals rule.

The three final winners were Montpellier, Juventus and West Ham United.

== Sources ==
- Rotblau: Jahrbuch Saison 2015/2016. Publisher: FC Basel Marketing AG. ISBN 978-3-7245-2050-4
- Rotblau: Jahrbuch Saison 2017/2018. Publisher: FC Basel Marketing AG. ISBN 978-3-7245-2189-1
- Die ersten 125 Jahre / 2018. Publisher: Josef Zindel im Friedrich Reinhardt Verlag, Basel. ISBN 978-3-7245-2305-5
- 1999–2000 at Joggeli.ch
- 1999–2000 at RSSSF
