= Křivánek =

Křivánek (feminine Křivánková) is a Czech surname. Notable people with the surname include:

- Ondřej Křivánek (born 1950), Czech physicist
- Petr Křivánek (born 1970), Czech footballer
- Tomáš Křivánek (born 1966), Czech canoeist
