= 1999–2000 OGC Nice season =

OGC Nice
1999–2000 season
- Chairman: Primo Salvi (until 7 October); Silvio Rotunno (from 7 October)
- Manager: Guy David
- Stadium: Stade du Ray
- French Division 2: 11th
- Coupe de France: Seventh round
- Coupe de la Ligue: Round of 32
- Average home league attendance: 4,745

The 1999–2000 OGC Nice season was the club's 96th season in existence and the third consecutive season in the top flight of French football. In addition to the domestic league, Nice participated in this season's editions of the Coupe de France and the Coupe de la Ligue. The season covers the period from 1 July 1999 to 30 June 2000.

== Pre-season and friendlies ==
Win Draw Loss

== Competitions ==
=== Overview ===
Competition	First match	Last match	Starting round	Final position	Record							
Competition	First match	Last match	Starting round	Final position	Pld	W	D	L	GF	GA	GD	Win %
French Division 2	31 July 1999	20 May 2000	Matchday 1	11th	38	10	20	8	34	33	+1	26.32
Coupe de France	27 November 1999		Seventh round	Seventh round	1	0	1	0	0	4	−4	0.00
Coupe de la Ligue	9 January 2000		Round of 32	Round of 32	1	0	1	0	0	1	−1	0.00
Total					40	10	22	8	34	38	−4	25.00

Source: Competitions

=== French Division 2 ===
==== League table ====
Pos	Team	Pld	W	D	L	GF	GA	GD	Pts
9	Le Mans	38	12	16	10	44	44	0	52
10	Laval	38	12	15	11	41	40	+1	51
11	Nice	38	10	20	8	34	33	+1	50
12	Cannes	38	12	12	14	33	38	−5	48
13	Lorient	38	12	11	15	32	39	−7	47

Source: Ligue 2

==== Results summary ====
Overall								Home						Away					
Pld	W	D	L	GF	GA	GD	Pts	W	D	L	GF	GA	GD	W	D	L	GF	GA	GD
38	10	20	8	34	33	+1	50	6	12	1	19	9	+10	4	8	7	15	24	−9

==== Results by round ====
Round	1	2	3	4	5	6	7	8	9	10	11	12	13	14	15	16	17	18	19	20	21	22	23	24	25	26	27	28	29	30	31	32	33	34	35	36	37	38
Ground	H	A	H	A	H	A	H	H	A	H	A	H	A	H	A	H	A	H	A	H	A	H	A	H	A	A	H	A	H	A	H	A	H	A	H	A	H	A
Result	D	L	D	L	D	D	D	W	L	D	D	W	D	D	D	D	W	D	W	W	L	D	L	D	D	D	L	L	W	D	D	W	D	D	W	L	W	W
Position	10	15	16	18	19	18	18	15	16	15	15	13	12	14	14	15	13	12	11	9	12	10	13	13	13	14	15	16	15	14	15	13	12	14	12	14	11	11

A = Away; H = Home; W = Win; D = Draw; L = Loss

==== Matches ====
31 July 1999 1	Nice	1–1	Gueugnon	Nice
				Stadium: Stade du Ray

7 August 1999 2	Sochaux	2–1	Nice

14 August 1999 3	Nice	0–0	Lille	Nice
				Stadium: Stade du Ray

17 August 1999 4	Amiens	4–1	Nice

20 August 1999 5	Nice	0–0	Guingamp	Nice
				Stadium: Stade du Ray

27 August 1999 6	Laval	1–1	Nice

3 September 1999 7	Nice	1–1	Nîmes	Nice
				Stadium: Stade du Ray

7 September 1999 8	Nice	2–0	Créteil	Nice
				Stadium: Stade du Ray

11 September 1999 9	Ajaccio	1–0	Nice

18 September 1999 10	Nice	0–0	Châteauroux	Nice
				Stadium: Stade du Ray

25 September 1999 11	Louhans-Cuiseaux	0–0	Nice

1 October 1999 12	Nice	2–0	Toulouse	Nice
				Stadium: Stade du Ray

8 October 1999 13	Wasquehal	2–2	Nice

16 October 1999 14	Nice	0–0	Niort	Nice
				Stadium: Stade du Ray

23 October 1999 15	Le Mans	0–0	Nice

30 October 1999 16	Nice	0–0	Caen	Nice
				Stadium: Stade du Ray

6 November 1999 17	Cannes	0–1	Nice

9 November 1999 18	Nice	0–0	Valence	Nice
				Stadium: Stade du Ray

12 November 1999 19	Lorient	0–1	Nice

20 November 1999 20	Nice	2–1	Sochaux	Nice
				Stadium: Stade du Ray

2 December 1999 21	Lille	1–0	Nice

11 December 1999 22	Nice	0–0	Amiens	Nice
				Stadium: Stade du Ray

14 January 2000 23	Guingamp	5–0	Nice

26 January 2000 24	Nice	2–2	Laval	Nice
				Stadium: Stade du Ray

2 February 2000 25	Nîmes	1–1	Nice

5 February 2000 26	Créteil	0–0	Nice

16 February 2000 27	Nice	0–1	Ajaccio	Nice
				Stadium: Stade du Ray

26 February 2000 28	Châteauroux	3–0	Nice

11 March 2000 29	Nice	2–0	Louhans-Cuiseaux	Nice
				Stadium: Stade du Ray

24 March 2000 30	Toulouse	0–0	Nice

31 March 2000 31	Nice	1–1	Wasquehal	Nice
				Stadium: Stade du Ray

8 April 2000 32	Niort	1–2	Nice

15 April 2000 33	Nice	1–1	Le Mans	Nice
				Stadium: Stade du Ray

21 April 2000 34	Caen	1–1	Nice

29 April 2000 35	Nice	2–0	Cannes	Nice
				Stadium: Stade du Ray

5 May 2000 36	Valence	2–0	Nice

12 May 2000 37	Nice	3–1	Lorient	Nice
				Stadium: Stade du Ray

20 May 2000 38	Gueugnon	0–4	Nice

=== Coupe de France ===
27 November 1999 Seventh round	AS Lyon Duchère	4–0 (a.e.t.)	Nice	Lyon
				Stadium: Stade de la Duchère; Attendance: 500

=== Coupe de la Ligue ===
9 January 2000 Round of 32	Nice	0–1	Sedan	Nice
				Stadium: Stade du Ray
