= Iván Knez =

Argentine-Swiss footballer (born 1974)

Ivan Knez
Personal information
- Full name: Iván Knez
- Date of birth: 21 July 1974 (age 52)
- Place of birth: Buenos Aires, Argentina
- Height: 1.84 m (6 ft 1/2 in)
- Position: Centre-back

Youth career
- SC Emmen

Senior career*
Years	Team	Apps	(Gls)
1994–1999	FC Lucerne	66	(2)
1999–2002	FC Basel	51	(0)
2002–2003	SK Rapid Wien	50	(1)
2003–2005	BSC Young Boys	56	(2)
2005–2007	FC Augsburg	10	(0)
Total		233	(5)
- * Club domestic league appearances and goals

Iván Knez (Spanish pronunciation: [/ iˈβan ˈknez /]; born 21 July 1974) is a former footballer who played as a defender during the 1990s and 2000s.

== Football career ==
Although he was born in Argentina, Knez was raised in Switzerland and started playing football in the youth movement of the local club SC Emmen. He began his professional career with FC Lucerne in 1994. After five years at the club, he moved to FC Basel in 1999.

Knez joined Basel's first team for their 1999–2000 season under new head coach Christian Gross. After playing one test match, his debut for his new club was in the home game in the Stadion Schützenmatte on 26 June 1999 as Basel beat Korotan 6–0 in return leg of the first round of the 1999 UI Cup and advanced to the next round. After playing in another UIC and another test game Knez played his domestic league debut for the club in the away game in the Cornaredo on 7 July 1999 as Basel played a 1–1 draw against Lugano. He scored his first goal for the club on 24 August in the away game in the stadion Espenmoos as Basel played a 1–1 draw against St. Gallen. Knez played as centre-back together with Oliver Kreuzer. FC Basel reached the final of the 2001 UEFA Intertoto Cup, but they lost to Aston Villa. Knez helped the club win the Double during the 2001/02 season.

Between the years 1999 and 2002 Knez played a total of 122 games for Basel scoring just the afore mentioned goal. 68 of these games were in the Nationalliga A, 5 in the Swiss Cup, 5 in the UEFA cup, 7 in the UI Cup and 37 were friendly games.

In August 2002, he signed for Austrian Bundesliga club SK Rapid Wien, but returned to the Swiss Nationalliga a year later with BSC Young Boys. He then headed off to Germany's second division with FC Augsburg, and he retired in the summer of 2007.

== Honours ==
Lucerne

- Swiss Cup Runner-Up: 1997

Basel

- Swiss League: 2002
- Swiss Cup: 2002

Augsburg

- Schwaben Cup: 2005

== Sources ==
- Rotblau: Jahrbuch Saison 2017/2018. Publisher: FC Basel Marketing AG. ISBN 978-3-7245-2189-1
- Die ersten 125 Jahre. Publisher: Josef Zindel im Friedrich Reinhardt Verlag, Basel. ISBN 978-3-7245-2305-5
- Verein "Basler Fussballarchiv" Homepage
