= Nenad Savić =

Swiss footballer (born 1981)

Personal information
- Full name: Nenad Savić
- Date of birth: 28 January 1981 (age 45)
- Place of birth: SFR Yugoslavia
- Height: 1.80 m (5 ft 11 in)
- Position: Midfielder

Youth career
- –1994: FC Dietikon
- 1994–1997: FC Zürich
- 1997–1998: Grasshopper Club Zürich

Senior career*
Years	Team	Apps	(Gls)
1998–1999	Grasshoppers	2	(0)
1999	Xamax	9	(0)
1999–2003	Basel	70	(5)
2003	Luzern	5	(0)
2004	Wil	30	(3)
2005–2006	Thun	13	(1)
2006–2007	Enosis Neon Paralimni	?	(?)
2007–2008	Maccabi Petah Tikva	12	(1)
2009–2010	Hapoel Ironi Kiryat Shmona	26	(0)
2010–2011	Maccabi Ironi Jatt	5	(0)
2011–2012	Beitar Tel Aviv Ramla	3	(0)

International career
2000–2004	Switzerland U-21	13	(3)
- * Club domestic league appearances and goals

Nenad Savić (Serbian Cyrillic: Ненад Савић; born 28 January 1981) is a Serbian-born Swiss former professional footballer.

== Career ==
=== Early years ===
Savić's family moved to Switzerland while he was still very young. He started his youth football with local amateur club FC Dietikon and as 12-year-old he moved on to the youth department of FC Zürich. In 1997 he moved from their U-21 team to the U-21 of Grasshopper Club Zürich and a year later advanced to their first team for the 1998–99 season. After having two league appearances in the first half of the season he moved on to Xamax in the winter break to play the second half of the season, in which he had nine league appearances, with them.

=== Basel ===
Savić joined Basel's first team for their 1999–2000 season under their new head coach Christian Gross. After playing in two test games, Savić played his debut for the club in the 1999 UIC on 11 July. He also scored his first goal for his new team in the same match. It was the team's third goal as Basel won 4–2 against Boby Brno to advance to the next round. He played his domestic league debut for the team in the home game at the Stadion Schützenmatte on 14 July as Basel played a 1–1 draw with Xamax. He scored his first league goal with the team on 11 September in the away game in the Stadion Brügglifeld as Basel won 3–1 against Aarau.

Basel started somewhat irregularly into the 2000–01 league season, a number of high scoring games, three victories, three defeats. They then gathered themselves and climbed to the top of the table. However, four defeats in the last five games, through them back to fifth position, at the end of the qualifying stage. Basel were able to play their home games of the championship group in their new stadium, the St. Jakob-Park which opened on 15 March 2001 and it was sold out with 33,433 spectators on three occasions. However, in the second half of the season, the team played eight draws in their 14 matches and so ended the season in fourth position. Savić had 22 league appearances, scoring one goal.

Savić injured himself before the 2001–02 season and only returned to the playing staff after the winter break. He was then used mainly as substitute. Basel started well into the second part of the season and during this period FCB played their best football, pulling away at the top of the table and subsequently achieved the championship title prematurely. Basel won the last game of the season, on 8 May 2002, and became champions ten points clear at the top of the table. Just four days later they played in the 2001–02 Swiss Cup final against Grasshopper Club winning 2–1 in extra time, winning the double. Although Savić spent the final on the bench he won his first two titles.

Basel's 2002–03 UEFA Champions League season started in the second qualifying round. After beating Žilina 4–1 on aggregate and Celtic on the away goals rule after a 3–3 aggregate, Basel advanced to the group stage. But Savić was only given one chance to prove himself. In the 2002–03 league season he was also demoted to becoming a substitute player. In that season's Cup the team advanced to the final and here they beat Xamax 6–0 to defend the title that they had won a season earlier. At the end of that season, the midfielder had come unhappy with his situation as substitute player and so, after four years with the club, he moved on. During his time with them, Savić played a total of 124 games for Basel scoring a total of 14 goals. 70 of these games were in the Swiss Super League, five in the Swiss Cup, five in the UEFA competitions (Champions League, UEFA Cup and UIC)) and 44 were friendly games. He scored five goals in the domestic league, one in the European games and the other eight were scored during the test games.

=== Luzern, Wil and Thun ===
In the summer of 2003 Savić joined Luzern, who at that time played in the Challenge League, the second tier of Swiss football. But, he was only given five appearances and so in January 2004 he moved on to FC Wil, who played top tier. Here he played as regular starter. In the 2003–04 Swiss Cup Wil advanced to the final, which was played in the St. Jakob-Park on 12 April 2004. Surprisingly Wil won this 3–2 against Grasshoppers to become Cup winners. However, the club were relegated at the end of the season, but he remained with the club.

In January 2005, Savić then moved on, this time to FC Thun, playing with them for one and a half seasons.

=== Later years ===
Savić signed for the Cypriot team Enosis Neon Paralimni for the 2006–07 season. One year later he signed a one-year contract Maccabi Petah Tikva and another year later, in July 2009 a one-year contract with Hapoel Ironi Kiryat Shmona.

He played a further two years in Israel.

=== International ===
Savić was first called up for the Swiss U-21 team in the 2000–01 season and he played his debut on 15 August against the Greece U-21 team. He played 13 times for the team from then until 2014, scoring three goals.

== Private life ==
On 1 March 2012, Savić was convicted of dealing cocaine by a district court in Zurich and given a three-year sentence. Savić appealed. The appeal was partially successful, but he was sentenced to three years, ten months of which conditionally.

== Honours ==
Basel

- Swiss Super League: 2001–02
- Swiss Cup: 2001–02, 2002–03

Wil

- Swiss Cup: 2003–04

Hapoel Ironi Kiryat Shmona

- Toto Cup (Leumit): 2009–10

== Sources ==
- Die ersten 125 Jahre. Publisher: Josef Zindel im Friedrich Reinhardt Verlag, Basel. ISBN 978-3-7245-2305-5
- Verein "Basler Fussballarchiv" Homepage
