= George Koumantarakis =

South African footballer

Personal information
- Full name: Georgios Koumantarakis
- Date of birth: 27 March 1974 (age 52)
- Place of birth: Athens, Greece
- Height: 1.93 m (6 ft 4 in)
- Position: Striker

Youth career
- 1991–1992: Stella Stars

Senior career*
Years	Team	Apps	(Gls)
1992–1994	AmaZulu	4	(0)
1994–1998	Manning Rangers	89	(49)
1997–1998	→ Supersport United (loan)	31	(14)
1998–1999	FC Luzern	28	(9)
1999–2003	FC Basel	84	(26)
2003–2004	Preston North End	17	(5)
2004–2005	FC Rot-Weiß Erfurt	6	(2)
2005–2006	Greuther Fürth	0	(0)
Total		259	(105)

International career
1997–2004	South Africa	13	(1)
- * Club domestic league appearances and goals

Georgios "George" Koumantarakis (born 27 March 1974) is a South African former soccer player of Greek descent. He was born in Athens, Greece but grew up in Durban, South Africa. He studied BCom & LLB degrees from the University of KwaZulu-Natal.

He is mostly remembered for his time at FC Basel where he played in the Swiss Super League and UEFA Champions League. He played for the South African national team and was a participant at the 2002 FIFA World Cup.

== Club career ==
Koumantarakis started out at South African team AmaZulu F.C. in 1992. He left the club after six months, however, to join Manning Rangers where he won the South African title. He joined one of South Africa's most successful teams, Supersport United FC, in 1996 for a then record South African club to club transfer. He was a success at Supersport and his big move to Europe came in 1998 when he signed for Swiss club FC Luzern. He had a good debut European season in Luzern and did enough to impress FC Basel.

Koumantarakis joined Basel's first team for their 1999–2000 season under new head coach Christian Gross. After playing one test match, he played his debut for his new club in the home game in the Stadion Schützenmatte on 26 June 1999 as Basel beat Korotan 6–0 in return leg of the first round of the 1999 UI Cup and advanced to the next round. He scored his first goal for his new club in the same game. In fact he scored four of the six goals in that game. After playing in another UIC and another test game Koumantarakis played his domestic league debut for the club in the away game in the Cornaredo on 7 July 1999 as Basel played a 1–1 draw against Lugano. Koumantarakis scored his first domestic league goal for his new club on 5 August in the away game in the Charmilles Stadium, Geneva as Basel played a 1–1 draw against Servette. He spent three and a half seasons with Basel and during this time Koumantarakis played a total of 130 games for Basel scoring a total of 51 goals. 84 of these games were in the Nationalliga A, 7 in the Swiss Cup, 3 in the Champions League, 5 in the UEFA cup, UI Cup and 23 were friendly games. He scored 26 goals in the domestic league, 6 in the cup, 10 in the european competitions and the other 9 were scored during the test games.

His period at Basel was undoubtedly the best of his career, winning national titles and playing in European competitions culminating in him appearing in the champions league in 2002–03 season. Basel went on to the final group phase of the competition that year. A move to England was on the cards next for Koumantarakis, signing for Championship outfit Preston North End in January 2003. He was a big signing for Preston but failed to live up to expectations as he was injured on international duty. He left Preston for German club Rot-Weiß Erfurt in the 2004–05 season but his time there was plagued by injury and only played a handful of games. Erfurt released Koumantarakis at the end of the season and he signed for SpVgg Greuther Fürth. He retired without playing a game for Fürth after failing to overcome his persistent knee injury.

== International career ==
Koumantarakis played for the South African national team from 1997 until 2004. He was drafted into the squad often (over 60 times) but was usually a reserve behind the likes of Benni McCarthy and Shaun Bartlett. He made his international debut against Congo, in a 2–0 defeat, on 6 April 1997 and played his last game for Bafana Bafana on 20 June 2004 in a 3–0 defeat to Ghana. The high point of his international career was playing at the 2002 FIFA World Cup in South Korea and Japan where he made a substitute appearance in all three of South Africa's group matches.

In total, he accumulated 13 caps scoring one goal.

=== International goals ===
#	Date	Venue	Opponent	Score	Result	Competition
1	20 May 2002	Hong Kong	Scotland	2–0	2–0	HKSAR Reunification Cup

== Honours ==
=== Club ===
- Premier Soccer League: 1996–97
- Swiss Cup: 2001–02
- Swiss Super League: 2001–02

=== Individual ===
- Premier Soccer League Top Goal-Scorer: 1997

== Sources ==
- Rotblau: Jahrbuch Saison 2017/2018. Publisher: FC Basel Marketing AG. ISBN 978-3-7245-2189-1
- Die ersten 125 Jahre. Publisher: Josef Zindel im Friedrich Reinhardt Verlag, Basel. ISBN 978-3-7245-2305-5
- Verein "Basler Fussballarchiv" Homepage
