= 2009–10 Toto Cup Leumit =

Toto Cup Leumit
- Season: 2009–10
- Champions: Ironi Kiryat Shmona (2nd title)

The 2009–10 Toto Cup Leumit was the twenty-eight season of the third most important football tournament in Israel since its introduction and sixth under the current format. It was held in two stages. First, sixteen Liga Leumit teams were divided into four groups. The winners and runners-up, were advanced to the Quarterfinals. Quarterfinals, Semifinals and Finals was held as one-legged matches, with the Final played at Winter Stadium in Ramat Gan. The defending champions were Hapoel Be'er Sheva, making it their third Toto Cup title overall.

It won on 15 December 2009 by Ironi Kiryat Shmona.

== Group stage ==
The matches were played from August 8 to October 11, 2009.

=== Group A ===
Pos	Team	Pld	W	D	L	GF	GA	GD	Pts	HAR	IRH	HBL	BTA
1	Hakoah Amidar Ramat Gan (A)	6	3	2	1	7	4	+3	11		0–0	2–1	3–0
2	Ironi Nir Ramat HaSharon (A)	6	2	4	0	9	4	+5	10	2–0		1–1	3–0
3	Hapoel Bnei Lod	6	1	3	2	8	9	−1	6	1–2	1–1		1–1
4	Beitar Shimshon Tel Aviv	6	0	3	3	5	12	−7	3	0–0	2–2	2–3	

Source: football.org.il (in Hebrew)
Rules for classification: 1st points; 2nd goal difference; 3rd matches won; 4th goals scored; 5th head-to-head; 6th decision match
(A) Advanced to the quarterfinals

=== Group B ===
Pos	Team	Pld	W	D	L	GF	GA	GD	Pts	IBY	HNI	AHV	HJE
1	Ironi Bat Yam (A)	6	2	4	0	8	5	+3	10		2–0	1–1	1–1
2	Hapoel Nazareth Illit (A)	6	2	2	2	6	7	−1	8	0–0		1–1	3–2
3	Ahva Arraba	6	1	3	2	7	7	0	6	1–2	0–1		3–1
4	Hapoel Jerusalem	6	1	3	2	9	11	−2	6	2–2	2–1	1–1	

Source: football.org.il (in Hebrew)
Rules for classification: 1st points; 2nd goal difference; 3rd matches won; 4th goals scored; 5th head-to-head; 6th decision match
(A) Advanced to the quarterfinals

=== Group C ===
Pos	Team	Pld	W	D	L	GF	GA	GD	Pts	HRL	MHE	HMK	MBS
1	Hapoel Rishon LeZion (A)	6	5	0	1	11	5	+6	15		3–1	0–1	1–0
2	Maccabi Herzliya (A)	6	3	0	3	8	8	0	9	2–3		1–0	0–2
3	Hapoel Marmorek	6	2	1	3	3	6	−3	7	1–3	0–2		0–0
4	Maccabi Be'er Sheva	6	1	1	4	2	5	−3	4	0–1	0–2	0–1	

Source: football.org.il (in Hebrew)
Rules for classification: 1st points; 2nd goal difference; 3rd matches won; 4th goals scored; 5th head-to-head; 6th decision match
(A) Advanced to the quarterfinals

=== Group D ===
Pos	Team	Pld	W	D	L	GF	GA	GD	Pts	SNT	IKS	HKS	HAS
1	Sektzia Nes Tziona (A)	6	3	2	1	10	3	+7	11		0–1	1–1	0–0
2	Ironi Kiryat Shmona (A)	6	3	2	1	13	8	+5	11	1–6		1–0	1–1
3	Hapoel Kfar Saba	6	1	3	2	5	10	−5	6	0–1	0–6		2–0
4	Hapoel Ashkelon	6	0	3	3	2	9	−7	3	0–2	0–3	1–1	

Source: football.org.il (in Hebrew)
Rules for classification: 1st points; 2nd goal difference; 3rd matches won; 4th goals scored; 5th head-to-head; 6th decision match
(A) Advanced to the quarterfinals

== Elimination rounds ==
=== Quarterfinals ===
November 13, 2009
13:30 UTC+3

Ironi Ramat HaSharon	1 – 1 (a.e.t.)	Hakoah Ramat Gan
?	Report (in Hebrew)	31' Ben Lulu
Penalties
Shmol (penalty missed); Ostaynd (penalty scored); Cohen (penalty scored); Beckel (penalty scored)	3 – 5	(penalty scored) Ben Salomon; (penalty scored) Ugochukwu; (penalty scored) Lankri; (penalty scored) Ben Lulu; (penalty scored) Salok

Grundman Stadium, Ramat HaSharon
Referee: Erez Papir

November 13, 2009
14:00 UTC+3

Maccabi Herzliya	0 – 2	Sektzia Nes Tziona
	Report (in Hebrew)	56' (pen.) Caveda; 86' Shari

Herzliya Stadium, Herzliya
Referee: Roi Reinshreiber

November 14, 2009
17:00 UTC+3

Hapoel Nazareth Illit	0 – 1	Hapoel Rishon LeZion
	Report (in Hebrew)	67' Afriat

Green Stadium, Nazareth Illit
Referee: Yona Yona

November 16, 2009
17:00 UTC+3

Ironi Kiryat Shmona	2 – 0	Ironi Bat Yam
Amashe 19'; Savić 84'	Report (in Hebrew)

Doha Stadium, Sakhnin
Referee: Guy Berger

=== Semifinals ===
December 1, 2009
18:00 UTC+3

Sektzia Nes Tziona	0 – 1 (a.e.t.)	Ironi Kiryat Shmona
	Report (in Hebrew)	93' Njovu

Hatikva Neighborhood Stadium, Tel Aviv
Referee: Nir Amar

December 1, 2009
18:00 UTC+3

Hapoel Rishon LeZion	4 – 2	Hakoah Ramat Gan
Megrelashvili 50'; Sapir 70'; Afriat 73'; Suissa 90'	Report (in Hebrew)	40' Ben Israel; 59' Agam Mashiah

Ness Ziona Stadium, Ness Ziona
Referee: David Mor Haim

=== Final ===
December 15, 2009
18:00 UTC+2

Hapoel Rishon LeZion	1 – 3	Ironi Kiryat Shmona
dos Santos 65'	Report (in Hebrew)	2' Nimba; 55' Savić; 63' Njovu

Winter Stadium, Ramat Gan
Referee: Ibrahim Abu Zeila

== See also ==
- 2009–10 Toto Cup Al
- 2009–10 Liga Leumit
- 2009–10 Israel State Cup
