= Luís Calapes =

Portuguese footballer

Luis Calapes
Personal information
- Full name: Luis Manuel Duarte Calapes
- Date of birth: 3 June 1978 (age 48)
- Place of birth: Funchal, Madeira, Portugal
- Height: 1.80 m (5 ft 11 in)
- Position: Left back

Youth career
- until 1996: FC Basel

Senior career*
Years	Team	Apps	(Gls)
1996–2001	FC Basel	29	(0)
2000	→ Neuchâtel Xamax (loan)	15	(1)
2001	→ SR Delémont (loan)	2	(0)
2001–2004	FC Concordia Basel	77	(10)
2004–2007	FC Luzern	27	(3)
2008–2011	FC Thun	16	(0)
- * Club domestic league appearances and goals

Luis Manuel Duarte Calapes (born 3 June 1978) is a Portuguese former footballer who played as defender in the 1990s and 2000s.

Calapes played his youth football with FC Basel and from their reserve team, he advanced to the first team for their 1997–98 season. After playing in three test games Calapes played his domestic league debut for the club in the away game on 29 March 1998 as Basel played a goalless drew with Lugano.

In the following season Calapes became more playing time under head-coach Guy Mathez. But things changed under new coach Christian Gross, in their 1999–2000 season Calapes played only seven league games. The following season Calapes was loaned for six months to Xamax and the second half of the season to SR Delémont, who played one tier lower. Between the years 1996 and 2001 Calapes played a total of 64 games for Basel scoring three goals. 29 of these games were in the Nationalliga A, one in the Swiss Cup, one in the UI Cup and 33 were friendly games. He scored the three goals during the test games.

Following his loan period Calapes transferred to Concordia Basel, who at that time played in the second tier of Swiss football. Here he was a regular starter and played for them for three seasons. In summer 2004 Calapes moved on to play for FC Luzern. But soon Calapes had to play in the reserve team and he was released by the club in December 2006. He found his new club FC Thun in April 2008. He played with them for three seasons before he retired from active football.

== Sources ==
- Rotblau: Jahrbuch Saison 2017/2018. Publisher: FC Basel Marketing AG. ISBN 978-3-7245-2189-1
- Die ersten 125 Jahre. Publisher: Josef Zindel im Friedrich Reinhardt Verlag, Basel. ISBN 978-3-7245-2305-5
- Verein "Basler Fussballarchiv" Homepage
