= Alexandre Quennoz =

Swiss footballer (born 1978)

Personal information
- Full name: Alexandre Quennoz
- Date of birth: 21 September 1978 (age 48)
- Place of birth: Sion, Switzerland
- Height: 1.84 m (6 ft 0 in)
- Position: Defender

Team information
- Current team: FC Sion (Youth coach)

Youth career
- until 1999: FC Sion

Senior career*
Years	Team	Apps	(Gls)
1996–1999	FC Sion	56	(1)
1999–2006	FC Basel	98	(0)
2006–2009	Neuchâtel Xamax	66	(2)

International career
	Switzerland U-21	9	(0)

Managerial career
- 2017–2020: FC Sion (youth)
- 2020–: FC Sion U-21
- * Club domestic league appearances and goals

Alexandre Quennoz (born 21 September 1978) is a former Swiss football player, who last played as a defender for Swiss Super League club Neuchâtel Xamax.

== Football career ==
Born in Sion, Valais, Quennoz played his youth football and started his career at local club FC Sion. He advanced to Sion's first team in 1996 under head-coach Alberto Bigon and during his first season he had five appearances for them, as they topped the table to become Swiss champions. During the next season Quennoz advanced to become a regular starter under new head-coach Jean-Claude Richard. Quennoz played three seasons for Sion before he moved on.

Quennoz joined FC Basel's first team for their 1999–2000 season under new head-coach Christian Gross. After playing in four test matches and four games in the UI Cup Quennoz played his domestic league debut for his new club in the away game on 31 October 1999 as Basel played a 2–2 draw with SR Delémont. In his first season with Basel Quennoz played in just eight league matches, but then he advanced to become a regular starter. In their FC Basel's 2001–02 season Quennoz was first choice right back and won the double (league and cup) with the club and advanced to the final of the UI Cup, but here they suffered defeat, Aston Villa won 5–2 on aggregate.

The following season Basel were runners-up in the league, but they were able to repeat the cup victory as Basel beat Xamax 6–0 in the final. Quennoz scored his first goal for his club on 19 October 2003 in the Swiss Cup away game as Basel won 4–1 against Urania Genève Sport.

In their 2003–04 season and 2004–05 season Quennoz and Basel were able to win the domestic league championship another two times. Quennoz played for Basel for seven season, but during the last two he was no longer regular player and therefore he decided to move on. Between the years 1999 and 2006 Quennoz played a total of 243 games for Basel scoring a total of three goals. 98 of these games were in the Nationalliga A, 14 in the Swiss Cup, 10 in the Champions League, nine in the UEFA Cup, 11 in the UI Cup and 101 were friendly games. He did not score a goal in the domestic league, but one in cup and the other two were scored during the test games.

In 2006 Quennoz joined Neuchâtel Xamax on a free transfer in search of first-team football. Xamax had just suffered relegation and were strengthening their squad in an attempt to regain promotion to the top flight. This attempt was achieved, as division champions Quennoz and Xamax won promotion. Quennoz played for Xamax for three years. His last game before retirement was in the 3–1 home win on 24 May 2009 against FC Aarau.

Quennoz played nine games for the Swiss national U-21 football team.

== Private life ==
Since his retirement he is working for an assurance company. In July 2017 Quennoz was appointed as coach by FC Sion for the U18 team. On 5 June 2020 the club announced that Quennoz was to become the coach for their U21 team.

== Honours ==
Sion

- Swiss Super League Champion: 1996–97

Basel

- Swiss Super League Champion: 2001–02, 2003–04, 2004–05
- Swiss Cup Winner: 2001–02, 2002–03

Neuchâtel Xamax

- Swiss Challenge League Champion and promotion: 2006–07

== Sources ==
- Alexandre Quennoz at WorldFootball.net
- Rotblau: Jahrbuch Saison 2017/2018. Publisher: FC Basel Marketing AG. ISBN 978-3-7245-2189-1
- Die ersten 125 Jahre. Publisher: Josef Zindel im Friedrich Reinhardt Verlag, Basel. ISBN 978-3-7245-2305-5
- Verein "Basler Fussballarchiv" Homepage
