= Carasso =

Part of Bellinzona, Switzerland

Coordinates: 46°12′0″N 9°1′0″E

Carasso and Galbisio are the parts of Bellinzona, Switzerland, located on the west side of the river Ticino.

The patriciate of Carasso (patriciates of canton Ticino) is responsible for the management of the forest and other community resources of the fraction.

Carasso was a municipality of its own until 1907.
