= Raphael Kehrli =

Swiss footballer (born 1977)

Personal information
- Date of birth: 14 September 1977 (age 49)
- Place of birth: Switzerland
- Height: 1.84 m (6 ft 0 in)
- Positions: Defender; midfielder

Team information
- Current team: Breitenrain (assistant coach)

Youth career
- FC Schwarzenburg
- BSC Young Boys

Senior career*
Years	Team	Apps	(Gls)
1995–1999	BSC Young Boys	79	(9)
1999–2000	Basel	24	(0)
2000–2001	Luzern	17	(1)
2001–2004	Yverdon-Sport	53	(7)
2004–2008	Biel-Bienne	88	(16)
2008–2022	Breitenrain	230	(29)

International career
1997–1999	Switzerland U-21	13	(0)

Managerial career
- 2015–: Breitenrain (assistant)
- * Club domestic league appearances and goals

Raphael Kehrli (born 14 September 1977) is a Swiss football coach and a former player. He played mainly as defender, but also as midfielder. Since 2015 he is an assistant coach with Breitenrain.

The young Kehrli played his early youth football with local club FC Schwarzenburg. Then moved to the youth department of BSC Young Boys, advancing to their first team in 1995. Between 1993 and 1999 Kehrli played as youth international at all levels from U-16 to U-21.

Kehrli joined Basel's first team for their for their 1999–2000 season under new head-coach Christian Gross. His first match for the club in the away game in Prevalje on 20 June 1999 as Basel played a goalless draw against Korotan in the first round of the 1999 UI Cup. After playing in two more UI Cup matches and in two test games Kehrli played his domestic league debut for the club in the away game in the Cornaredo on 7 July as Basel and Lugano played a 1–1 draw. He scored his first goal for his new club just a few days later, on 11 July in the away game in the Stadion Za Lužánkami, Brno, as Basel Played the UIC second round match. It was the last goal of the match and Basel won 4–2 against Boby Brno to proceed to the next round.

Kehrli stayed with the club for only this one season and then moved on. During this time Kehrli played a total of 48 games for Basel scoring a total of 7 goals. 24 of these games were in the Nationalliga A, 2 in the Swiss Cup, 4 in the UIC and 18 were friendly games. He scored 1 goal in the UIC and the other 6 were scored during the test games.

Kehrli moved to Luzern and here he stayed only one season as well. He then played four seasons for Yverdon-Sports, followed by four seasons for Biel-Bienne. In his last career phase from 2008 to 2022 he played for the Breitenrain in Bern, from 2011 for eight years together with his brother Nicolas, who was also a professional footballer. Since 2015 Raphael Kehrli is an assistant coach with the team and works as teacher in a school very close to the FC Breitenrain football ground.

== Sources ==
- Rotblau: Jahrbuch Saison 2017/2018. Publisher: FC Basel Marketing AG. ISBN 978-3-7245-2189-1
- Die ersten 125 Jahre. Publisher: Josef Zindel im Friedrich Reinhardt Verlag, Basel. ISBN 978-3-7245-2305-5
- Verein "Basler Fussballarchiv" Homepage
