= Samir Boughanem =

Moroccan footballer (born 1975)

Personal information
- Full name: Samir Boughanem
- Date of birth: 8 August 1975 (age 51)
- Place of birth: Ambilly, France
- Height: 1.80 m (5 ft 11 in)
- Position: Midfielder

Youth career
- 1992–1995: AS Saint-Étienne

Senior career*
Years	Team	Apps	(Gls)
1995–1997	Etoile-Carouge FC	63	(0)
1997–2000	Neuchâtel Xamax	66	(5)
2000–2001	Etoile-Carouge FC	32	(8)
2001–2003	Racing de Ferrol	61	(3)
2003	Shamrock Rovers	14	(0)
2004	FC Meyrin	13	(4)
2004–2005	Kerkyra	22	(2)
2005–2006	FC Meyrin	24	(7)
2006–2009	Servette FC	73	(6)
2010–2011	FC Meyrin	27	(0)

International career
2003	Morocco	9	(0)
- * Club domestic league appearances and goals

Samir Boughanem (born 8 August 1975 in Ambilly, France) is a Moroccan retired football player. He last played for FC Meyrin.

== Career ==
Born in France, Boughanem spent most of his career playing as a midfielder for clubs in Switzerland. With Neuchâtel Xamax, he played in the 1999 UEFA Intertoto Cup against Shelbourne F.C.

He signed with Shamrock Rovers in August 2003 under Liam Buckley and made his debut in the derby against Bohemians on September 1. Samir made 14 appearances for the team.

After he retired from playing, Boughanem received his UEFA A license and began a career as a football manager. He was appointed the manager of Swiss 1. Liga side Lancy FC in April 2022.
