= Çetin Güner =

Turkish-German footballer

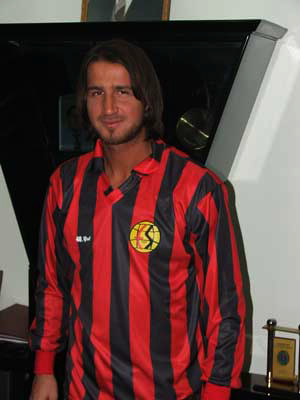
- Cetin Güner in 2005

Personal information
- Date of birth: 28 December 1977 (age 48)
- Place of birth: Bielefeld, Germany
- Height: 1.84 m (6 ft 0 in)
- Position: Forward

Youth career
- –1995: Borussia Dortmund

Senior career*
Years	Team	Apps	(Gls)
1995–1996	Borussia Dortmund Amateure		
1997–1998	Trabzonspor	28	(8)
1999–2000	FC Basel	21	(0)
2001–2002	Gaziantepspor	18	(1)
2002–2003	Yozgatspor	27	(8)
2003–2004	Diyarbakırspor	25	(1)
2004–2006	Elazığspor	25	(2)
2006	Eskişehirspor	20	(2)
2007	Arsinspor	13	(2)
2007–2008	Gänclärbirliyi Sumqayit	4	(0)
Total		181	(24)

International career
1996–1997	Turkey U-21	9	(2)
1998	Turkey U-23		

Managerial career
- 2015–2019: Borussia Dortmund (junior C team assistant)
- 2016–2020: Borussia Dortmund (junior B team assistant)
- * Club domestic league appearances and goals

Çetin Güner (born 28 December 1977) is a Turkish-German former professional footballer, who played as forward in the late 90's and early 2000s.

== Career ==
Güner played youth football with Borussia Dortmund and at the end of the 1994–95 season won the A-Jugend-Regionalliga championship, the forerunner of the Under 19 Bundesliga.

In the winter break of the 1996–97 season Güner joined Turkish Süper Lig club Trabzonspor. In his debut on 16 February 1997, he was substituted on in the 56th minute and then he scored two goals for his new team as they won 3–0 against Antalyaspor. At the end of the season, he had nine appearances, scoring three goals. In the 1996–97 Turkish Cup Final second leg he was substituted on, but was unable to help his team, as they lost the match, to become runners-up in the competition. He played another one and a half seasons with them.

In March 1999 Güner joined FC Basel's first team, during their 1998–99 season, under head coach Guy Mathez and then his successor Marco Schällibaum, enjoying the trainings, but not playing competitive football with them. Güner played his debut for his new team after the appointment of new head coach Christian Gross, in their following season. In the away game in the 1999 UEFA Intertoto Cup on 20 June 1999 he played as right winger, as Basel played a goalless draw against Slovenian team Korotan Prevalje. Güner played as forward in his domestic league debut for the team in the away game in the Cornaredo on 7 July as Basel played a 1–1 draw with Lugano. But his debut was cut short as Basel's team captain and central defender Oliver Kreuzer was shown the red card on 33 minutes. It was a tactical measure as Güner was substituted out and defender Sébastien Barberis came in. Güner played one game in the 1999–2000 Swiss Cup, on 13 November, an away game against Mendrisio and in this game he scored his only goal for the team. It was the last goal of the game, as Basel won 5–1 to advance to the next round. In the second half of the season he was only used as substitute and in the following season he didn't play a single minute and so decided to leave the club. During his time with the club, Güner played a total of 44 games for Basel scoring a total of four goals. 21 of these games were in the Swiss Super League, one in the Swiss Cup, six in the Intertoto Cup and 16 were friendly games. He scored that afore mentioned goal in the cup and the other three were scored during the test games.

In January 2001 Güner returned to Turkey and joined Süper Lig club Gaziantepspor on a free transfer. One and a half years later he moved to Yozgatspor and played one division lower. Just 18 months later he moved to Diyarbakırspor and played the 2003–04 Süper Lig season with them. He then played 18 months for Elazığspor and one year for Eskişehirspor. After playing six months for Arsinspor, Güner moved to Azerbaijan and played with Gänclärbirliyi Sumqayit until he retired from active football.

Güner also represented Turkey, playing in their national U-21 team and their U-23 team.

== Sources ==
- Josef Zindel (2018). FC Basel 1893. Die ersten 125 Jahre (in German). Basel: Friedrich Reinhardt Verlag. ISBN 978-3-7245-2305-5.
