= Didier Tholot =

French football manager (born 1964)

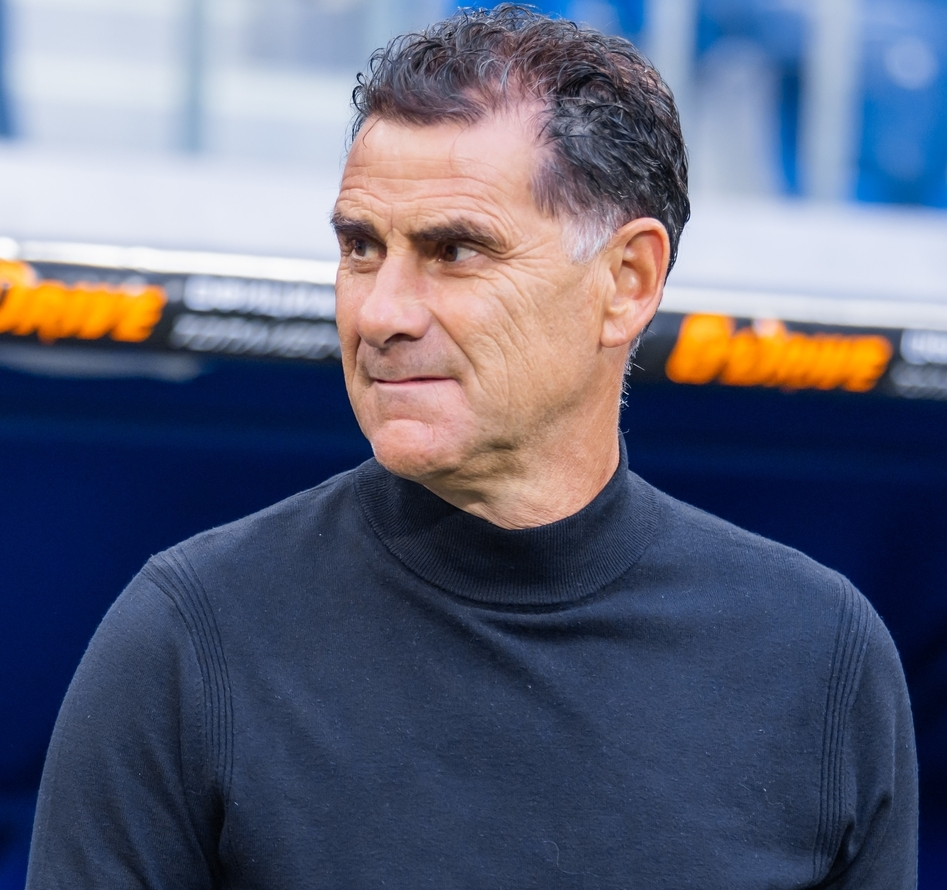
- Tholot in 2015

Personal information
- Date of birth: 2 April 1964 (age 62)
- Place of birth: Feurs, France
- Position: Striker

Team information
- Current team: Sion (Manager)

Youth career
- –1984: INF Vichy

Senior career*
Years	Team	Apps	(Gls)
1984–1987	Toulon	31	(1)
1987–1990	Niort	91	(18)
1990–1991	Reims	34	(14)
1991–1993	Saint-Étienne	50	(6)
1993–1995	Martigues	72	(26)
1995–1997	Bordeaux	20	(5)
1997–1999	Sion	51	(20)
1998	→ Walsall (loan)	14	(4)
1999–2000	Basel	44	(12)
2000–2001	Young Boys	14	(3)
2001–2003	Vevey Sports	42	(36)
2003–2004	Sion	20	(6)
Total		483	(151)

Managerial career
- 2002–2003: Vevey Sports
- 2003–2004: Sion
- 2005–2008: Libourne Saint-Seurin
- 2008: Reims
- 2009–2010: Sion
- 2010–2013: Châteauroux
- 2014: Bastia (Assistant)
- 2014–2016: Sion
- 2018: Nancy
- 2020–2023: Pau
- 2023–: Sion
- * Club domestic league appearances and goals

Didier Tholot (born 2 April 1964) is a French former professional footballer who turned to management in 2002, and is currently the manager of Sion in the Swiss Super League. Whilst at Bordeaux, he played in the 1996 UEFA Cup Final.

== Playing career ==
Tholot was born in Feurs, Loire, Auvergne-Rhône-Alpes. After completing his training at INF Vichy in 1984, Tholot signed his first professional contract with Toulon in the first division where he learned the ropes during three years. He was then transferred to Niort where he played for two seasons.

In 1990, he was recruited by Reims. In spite of the club's financial difficulties eventually leading to relegation at the end of the season, Tholot scored 14 goals in 34 competitive matches. The following season, he was recruited by Saint-Étienne on a two-year contract but, given less playing time in his second season, moved on to Martigues, who were freshly promoted from Division 2. With 27 goals to his credit over two seasons, he was noticed by Bordeaux to play alongside Zinedine Zidane, Christophe Dugarry and Bixente Lizarazu.

With Bordeaux, Tholot's career reached its pinnacle. He scored the first goal of a famous second-leg home comeback victory over the great A.C. Milan of 1996 (3–0). This team went on to reach the final of the 1996 UEFA Cup Final and to play the final of the Coupe de la Ligue the following season, with Tholot then partnering Jean-Pierre Papin up front.

Tholot finished the last years of his playing career in Switzerland. First he signed a three-year contract with Sion ahead of the 1997–98 Nationalliga A season under head coach Alberto Bigon. However, for the second half of the season their new coach Jean-Claude Richard loaned him out to English team Walsall, who at that time played in the Football League Second Division, second tier. Although he had a successful time with them, reaching the Southern Area final in the 1997–98 Football League Trophy and scoring a goal in the second leg, the British club die not pull their buy-out option. Tholot returned to Sion to fulfill his contract and play in the 1998–99 Nationalliga A, but the team were relegated at the end of the season. Tholot played as regular starter and scored 17 league goals in his 34 appearances. His goal tally was surpassed solely by the league top scorer Alexandre Rey, who netted 19 times. Because his contract was only valid for the top-tier, Tholot left the club.

He joined Basel's first team for their 1999–2000 season under their new head coach Christian Gross. Tholot played his debut for the team in the home game in the 1999 UEFA Intertoto Cup at the Stadion Schützenmatte on 4 July 1999, as Basel played a goalless draw with Boby Brno. He scored his first goal for his new team one week later in the return leg as Basel won 4–2 to advance to the next round. He played his Swiss Super League debut for the team in the home game on 14 July and he scored his first goal for them in the same match as Basel played a 1–1 draw with Xamax. At the end of the season's qualifying phase, Basel were in second position in the table, but eight points adrift. In the Championship Round, Basel played amongst the table leaders and in the tenth round they even managed a 3–1 victory against league leaders St. Gallen and Tholot had scored a brace in this match. However, in their last four matches Basel won only two further points and dropped to third position, 14 points behind new champions St Gallen. In his 31 appearances, Tholot netted eight goals.

However, in the 2000–01 Nationalliga A season Tholot was mainly being used by head coach Christian Gross as a substitute and so during the winter break he decided to move on. In his 18 months with the club, Tholot played a total of 72 games for Basel scoring a total of 22 goals. 44 of these games were in the Swiss Super League, three in the Swiss Cup, seven in the UEFA competitions (UEFA Intertoto Cup and UEFA Cup) and 18 were friendly games. He scored 12 goals in the domestic league, three in the European games and the other seven were scored during the test games.

Tholot then played 12 months for Young Boys and in January 2002 he moved to Vevey Sports, in the third tier of Swiss football, the first six months as player and the following 2002–03 season as player-coach, narrowly avoiding relegation in Group 1.

== Coaching career ==
Following an auspicious coaching debut at Vevey Sports, Tholot was hired by Sion of the Swiss first division. He then moved on to manage Libourne Saint-Seurin for three seasons, notably achieving promotion to Ligue 2 in his first season.

Tholot's next move to Reims was short-lived as he was replaced by Luis Fernández in December 2008. In April 2009 Tholot embarked on his second stint with Sion in order to save the club from the drop. Not only did the team avoid relegation that year but it also won the Swiss Cup. Tholot left the club at the end of the following season.

In June 2010, Tholot took on the managerial duties of Châteauroux where, in spite of severe financial restrictions, he managed to keep the club in Ligue 2 for three seasons. He left the club in October 2012.

In May 2014, he became assistant manager to Claude Makélélé at first division Bastia. When Makélélé was sacked in November 2008, Tholot declined the top job out of "loyalty".

In December 2014, he returned to Sion for a third spell. As in 2009, the club avoided relegation and again won the Swiss Cup against Basel at its opponent's home ground. During the 2015–16 season, Sion qualified for the round of 16 of the UEFA Europa League, making it out of the group stage in a pool also including Liverpool, Bordeaux and Rubin Kazan. Tholot left Sion 12 August 2016.

In April 2018, Tholot was appointed manager of Nancy, who were struggling near the bottom of Ligue 2. Although he was successful in saving the club from relegation, a poor start to the 2018–19 season saw him removed from the post in October.

After eighteen months away from management, Tholot was appointed by newly promoted Pau on 18 May 2020, in preparation for the new season.

On 15 June 2023, he returned to Sion in the Swiss Challenge League. It will be his fourth stint coaching Sion, who were recently relegated from the Super League.

== Honours ==
=== As a player ===
Bordeaux

- UEFA Intertoto Cup: 1995
- Coupe de la Ligue runner up:1997

=== As a manager ===
Sion

- Swiss Cup: 2008–09, 2014–15
- UEFA Europa League, qualifying for the last 16: 2015–16

Libourne Saint-Seurin

- Promotion to Ligue 2: 2005–06
