= Patrick Winkler =

Swiss footballer (born 1973)

Personal information
- Full name: Patrick Winkler
- Date of birth: 2 April 1973 (age 53)
- Place of birth: Switzerland
- Position: Defender

Senior career*
Years	Team	Apps	(Gls)
1992–1996	FC St. Gallen		
1996–1997	SR Delémont		
1997–1999	FC Wil 1900		
1999–2003	FC St. Gallen		
2003–2004	FC Wil 1900		
- * Club domestic league appearances and goals

Patrick Winkler (born 2 April 1973) is a Swiss former professional footballer who played as a defender. He competed primarily in the Swiss Super League with FC St. Gallen and FC Wil 1900, and also spent a season at SR Delémont.

== Career ==
Winkler began his senior career with FC St. Gallen in 1992, where he spent four seasons before transferring to SR Delémont. He later played two years with FC Wil 1900 and then returned to FC St. Gallen for a second stint from 1999 to 2003. He concluded his professional career with another season at FC Wil.
