= Petr Křivánek =

Czech footballer (born 1970)

Personal information
- Date of birth: 18 March 1970 (age 56)
- Place of birth: Brno, Czechoslovakia
- Height: 1.92 m (6 ft 4 in)
- Position: Defender

Senior career*
Years	Team	Apps	(Gls)
1991–2005	FC Zbrojovka Brno	338	(21)

International career
1996	Czech Republic	1	(0)
- * Club domestic league appearances and goals

Petr Křivánek (born 18 March 1970) is a Czech former footballer. A native of Brno, he spent his sole club career for FC Zbrojovka Brno, serving as club captain.

At international level, Křivánek played for the Czech Republic. He played his 300th match for Brno in 2004.
