= 2001–02 Nationalliga A =

Swiss football season

Nationalliga A
- Season: 2001–02
- Champions: Basel; 9th title
- Relegated: Sporting: Aarau; Luzern; License: None
- Top goalscorer: Christian Giménez (28); Richard Núñez (28)

The 2002–03 season of the Swiss Nationalliga contained two divisions, each with twelve clubs. The top tier was called Nationalliga A (NLA) (French: Ligue Nationale A, Italian: Lega Nazionale A) and the second tier was named Nationalliga B (NLB).

== Overview ==
The season was divided into two phases. The first of which was the qualification phase, and within the divisions the teams played a double round-robin, one at home and the other away. The divisions were then split. The first eight teams of the NLA then competed in the championship group and played a further double round-robin. The teams in ninth to twelfth position competed with the top four teams of the NLB in a promotion/relegation group to decide which four teams would play top tier next season. The other eight teams of the second tier competed in a play-out against relegation to the 1. Liga and the last two teams were to be relegated.

This was the second last season in which the Swiss championship would be competed in this format. It was already in planning that in two seasons the Nationalliga would be renamed to Swiss Football League and the championships were to be renamed and reformed.

== Nationalliga A ==
=== Qualification phase ===
==== Table ====
Pos	Team	Pld	W	D	L	GF	GA	GD	Pts	Qualification
1	Basel	22	13	4	5	52	37	+15	43	Advance to championship round halved points (rounded up) as bonus
2	Lugano	22	11	5	6	39	33	+6	38	Advance to championship round halved points (rounded up) as bonus
3	Grasshopper Club	22	11	4	7	50	33	+17	37	Advance to championship round halved points (rounded up) as bonus
4	St. Gallen	22	9	8	5	38	32	+6	35	Advance to championship round halved points (rounded up) as bonus
5	Servette	22	9	7	6	36	29	+7	34	Advance to championship round halved points (rounded up) as bonus
6	Sion	22	10	3	9	40	29	+11	33	Advance to championship round halved points (rounded up) as bonus
7	Young Boys	22	8	7	7	35	28	+7	31	Advance to championship round halved points (rounded up) as bonus
8	Zürich	22	7	9	6	24	27	−3	30	Advance to championship round halved points (rounded up) as bonus
9	Aarau	22	7	6	9	28	25	+3	27	Continue to promotion/relegation round
10	Neuchâtel Xamax	22	6	7	9	28	36	−8	25	Continue to promotion/relegation round
11	Lausanne-Sport	22	4	4	14	24	49	−25	16	Continue to promotion/relegation round
12	Luzern	22	3	4	15	23	59	−36	13	Continue to promotion/relegation round

Source: RSSSF

==== Results ====
Home \ Away	AAR	BAS	GCZ	LS	LUG	LUZ	NX	SER	SIO	STG	YB	ZÜR
Aarau		1–1	1–0	2–0	3–1	3–2	1–2	1–1	0–1	2–2	2–0	2–3
Basel	1–0		4–5	3–1	5–1	4–1	5–1	3–1	2–2	2–1	3–1	2–1
Grasshopper	1–0	1–0		1–2	2–5	6–0	4–1	3–0	6–1	0–3	1–1	0–0
Lausanne-Sport	0–3	2–4	2–4		1–2	3–2	1–1	0–3	1–1	2–1	2–3	1–1
Lugano	1–0	1–2	5–3	2–1		5–0	3–1	1–1	1–1	0–1	0–0	1–1
Luzern	2–1	0–1	2–1	1–3	1–2		0–0	1–1	1–3	2–6	0–4	3–0
Neuchâtel Xamax	0–0	1–0	1–4	2–1	1–3	4–1		1–3	3–0	0–0	0–0	1–1
Servette	3–3	1–4	1–1	1–1	1–0	2–0	2–0		1–2	2–3	3–0	0–2
St. Gallen	1–1	3–3	0–0	3–0	0–1	1–1	4–3	2–2		0–1	4–1	3–1
Sion	0–1	8–1	2–1	1–0	5–0	3–1	0–4	1–3	0–1		1–0	0–1
Young Boys	2–1	2–2	1–3	7–0	1–1	5–1	2–0	0–1	1–0	3–2		1–1
Zürich	1–0	2–0	1–3	1–0	2–3	1–1	1–1	0–3	3–2	0–0	0–0	

Legend: Blue = home team win; Yellow = draw; Red = away team win.

=== Championship round ===
The first eight teams of the qualification then competed in the Championship Round. They took half of the points (rounded up to complete units) gained in the Qualification as bonus with them.

==== Table ====
Pos	Team	Pld	W	D	L	GF	GA	GD	BP	Pts	Qualification or relegation
1	Basel (C)	14	11	0	3	36	16	+20	22	55	Qualification to Champions League third qualifying round
2	Grasshopper Club	14	7	5	2	28	17	+11	19	45	Qualification to UEFA Cup first round
3	Lugano (Note: Both Lugano and Sion did not obtain a 1st level license for the 2002/03 season. Nor die Lausanne; all three clubs are relegated to the NL B and their NL A places filled by Aarau, Delémont and Luzern.) (R)	14	7	2	5	23	19	+4	19	42	Qualification to UEFA Cup qualifying round
4	Servette	14	6	3	5	25	23	+2	17	38	Qualification to UEFA Cup qualifying round
5	Zürich	14	6	2	6	14	17	−3	15	35	Qualification to Intertoto Cup first round
6	St. Gallen	14	4	4	6	18	20	−2	18	34	Qualification to Intertoto Cup first round
7	Young Boys	14	4	3	7	18	25	−7	16	31	
8	Sion (R)	14	1	1	12	10	35	−25	17	21	

Source: RSSSF
(C) Champions; (R) Relegated

==== Results ====
Home \ Away	BAS	GCZ	LUG	SER	SIO	STG	YB	ZÜR
Basel		4–1	4–3	3–2	4–0	1–2	2–0	1–0
Grasshopper	1–0		2–1	2–2	1–0	3–3	1–1	3–0
Lugano	2–5	1–0		1–3	2–0	1–0	2–1	2–0
Servette	1–2	1–5	1–0		4–1	2–2	0–0	0–1
Sion	0–3	0–2	1–4	2–3		0–2	3–1	1–1
St. Gallen	1–3	2–2	0–0	1–3	2–1		3–1	0–1
Young Boys	0–3	1–4	2–2	3–1	4–0	1–0		3–2
Zürich	3–1	1–1	0–2	0–2	2–1	1–0	2–0	

Legend: Blue = home team win; Yellow = draw; Red = away team win.

== Nationalliga B ==
=== Qualification phase ===
==== Table ====
Pos	Team	Pld	W	D	L	GF	GA	GD	Pts	Qualification
1	Wil	22	12	5	5	53	32	+21	41	Advance to promotion/relegation NLA/LNB round
2	Winterthur	22	12	3	7	48	48	0	39	Advance to promotion/relegation NLA/LNB round
3	Thun	22	11	5	6	42	32	+10	38	Advance to promotion/relegation NLA/LNB round
4	Delémont	22	11	5	6	33	26	+7	38	Advance to promotion/relegation NLA/LNB round
5	Yverdon-Sport	22	10	5	7	37	31	+6	35	Continue to relegation round NLB/1. Liga halved points (rounded up) as bonus
6	Étoile Carouge	22	8	7	7	27	26	+1	31	Continue to relegation round NLB/1. Liga halved points (rounded up) as bonus
7	Kriens	22	9	3	10	28	30	−2	30	Continue to relegation round NLB/1. Liga halved points (rounded up) as bonus
8	Bellinzona	22	7	4	11	26	33	−7	25	Continue to relegation round NLB/1. Liga halved points (rounded up) as bonus
9	Baden	22	5	9	8	40	37	+3	24	Continue to relegation round NLB/1. Liga halved points (rounded up) as bonus
10	Locarno	22	6	5	11	28	34	−6	23	Continue to relegation round NLB/1. Liga halved points (rounded up) as bonus
11	Vaduz	22	5	7	10	34	43	−9	22	Continue to relegation round NLB/1. Liga halved points (rounded up) as bonus
12	Concordia Basel	22	5	4	13	34	58	−24	19	Continue to relegation round NLB/1. Liga halved points (rounded up) as bonus

Source: RSSSF
Rules for classification: 1) points; 2) goal difference; 3) number of goals scored.

=== Promotion/relegation NLA/NLB ===
==== Table ====
Pos	Team	Pld	W	D	L	GF	GA	GD	Pts	Qualification
1	Xamax	14	8	4	2	26	12	+14	28	Remain in NLA
2	Lausanne-Sport (Note: Lausanne did not obtain a top level license for the 2002/03 season, neither did Lugano and Sion; these three clubs were relegated to the NLB and their NLA places filled by Aarau, Delémont and Luzern.)	14	8	2	4	21	14	+7	26	Did not obtain licence for top level
3	Wil	14	6	5	3	17	13	+4	23	Promoted to NLA
4	Thun	14	6	3	5	19	18	+1	21	Promoted to NLA
5	Aarau	14	6	3	5	20	20	0	21	Relegated, but remained in NLA via green table
6	Delémont	14	4	4	6	14	20	−6	16	Promoted on green table
7	Luzern	14	2	5	7	26	28	−2	11	Relegated, but remained in NLA via green table
8	Winterthur	14	1	4	9	11	29	−18	7	Remain in NLB

Source: RSSSF
Rules for classification: 1) points; 2) goal difference; 3) number of goals scored.

==== Results ====
Home \ Away	AAR	DEL	NX	LS	LUZ	THU	WIL	WIN
Aarau		2–0	2–1	0–3	2–1	1–3	0–1	3–0
Delémont	2–1		1–2	4–0	0–0	0–0	1–0	1–0
Neuchâtel Xamax	3–1	4–0		1–0	3–2	4–0	2–0	2–0
Lausanne-Sport	0–1	3–2	1–1		1–0	1–0	2–0	4–1
Luzern	2–2	4–1	2–2	1–2		3–3	1–2	4–1
Thun	0–1	1–1	2–0	2–0	4–2		1–2	1–0
Wil	2–2	3–1	0–0	0–0	2–2	2–0		2–0
Winterthur	2–2	0–0	1–1	1–4	3–2	1–2	1–1	

Legend: Blue = home team win; Yellow = draw; Red = away team win.

=== Relegation NLB/1. Liga ===
==== Table ====
Pos	Team	Pld	W	D	L	GF	GA	GD	BP	Pts	Qualification
1	Yverdon-Sport	14	8	1	5	30	26	+4	18	43	Remain in LNB
2	Vaduz	14	8	3	3	28	18	+10	11	38	Remain in LNB
3	Bellinzona	14	7	3	4	22	18	+4	13	37	Remain in LNB
4	Kriens	14	7	0	7	31	24	+7	15	36	Remain in LNB
5	Concordia Basel	14	6	4	4	23	20	+3	15	37	Remain in LNB
6	Baden	14	5	2	7	15	21	−6	12	29	Remain in LNB
7	Locarno	14	4	5	5	17	19	−2	12	29	Relegated to 1. Liga
8	Étoile Carouge	14	1	2	11	10	30	−20	16	21	Relegated to 1. Liga

Source: RSSSF
Rules for classification: 1) points; 2) Position in the qualification

== Attendances ==
#	Club	Average
1	Basel	25,820
2	St. Gallen	9,917
3	Young Boys	9,753
4	GCZ	7,089
5	Zürich	6,338
6	Sion	5,767
7	Servette	4,550
8	Xamax	4,456
9	Aarau	4,238
10	Lugano	3,777
11	Luzern	3,470
12	Lausanne	2,314

== Sources ==
- RSSSF
