= 2002–03 FC Basel season =

FC Basel
2002–03 season
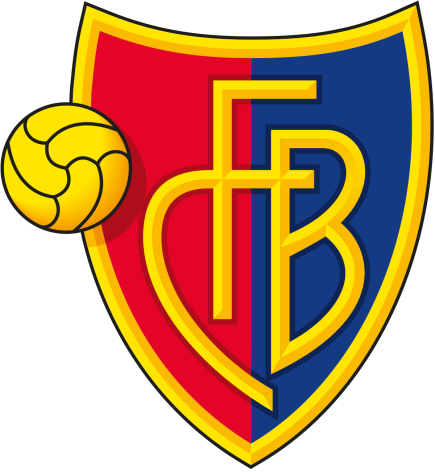
- Club president: Werner Edelmann
- Head coach: Christian Gross
- Stadium: St. Jakob-Park
- 2002–03 NLA Qualification round: 2nd of 12
- Championship round: 2nd of 8
- 2002–03 Swiss Cup: winners
- Champions League: Second group stage
- Top goalscorer: League: Christian Giménez (20); All: Christian Giménez (33)
- Highest home attendance: 35,000 (vs. Manchester United, 26 November)
- Lowest home attendance: 16,053 (vs. Servette, 8 March)
- Average home league attendance: 26,872

The 2002–03 season was FC Basel's 110th season of competition, and the club's 9th consecutive season in the Nationalliga A, the top flight of Swiss football. Basel played their home games in the newly constructed St. Jakob-Park complex. René C. Jäggi, who had been the club chairman for the previous six seasons, stood down at the AGM in October, and businessman Werner Edelmann was elected as the new chairman.

The club sought to retain the Swiss Nationalliga A and Swiss Cup titles after winning the double the previous season. They also sought to compete in the Champions League for as long as possible, as well as reach its group stage.

Basel ended the domestic league season as runners-up in the league and winners of the Swiss Cup. They also reached the second group stage of the Champions League.

== Overview ==
=== Off-season and pre-season ===
Basel started the season with high aspirations as reigning champions and cup holders. Basel and Grasshopper Club Zürich were the favourites to win the domestic championship title. Basel chose winning the championship as their top goal. Their second objective was to defend the Swiss Cup because it would be played at their home stadium, St. Jakob-Park. Basel also entered the 2002–03 Champions League in the second qualifying round and aimed to reach the group stage.

Massimo Ceccaroni retired from his professional career prior to the season. Ceccaroni is still considered to be a cult figure in Basel, due to his 25 years total of loyalty towards the club and the fact that he never scored a goal in the top flight of Swiss football. As a result of making very few appearances for the team the previous season, the club decided not to renew his contract at the end of the season, and his professional career came to an end. Ceccaroni played a total of 605 games for Basel from 1987 to 2002. 398 of these games were in the Nationalliga A and Nationalliga B, 34 in the Swiss Cup, 20 in the European competitions (UEFA cup and UIC) and 153 were friendly games. He scored six goals throughout his career, four in the Nationalliga B and two during friendlies. Other players who left the squad included fellow retirees Oliver Kreuzer and Romain Crevoisier, and Miroslav König, who transferred to Zürich.

Soon after the season began, Philippe Cravero moved to Servette, first on loan and then definitively. During his tenure of just over four seasons with the club between 1998 and 2002, Cravero played 185 games for Basel, scoring a total of five goals. 108 of these games were in the Nationalliga A, 8 in the Swiss Cup, 16 in the European competitions (UEFA cup and UIC) and 53 were friendly games. He scored two goals in the domestic league and three in friendly matches.

Christian Gross was the first team trainer for the fourth successive season. Knowing the high aspirations for the season, Gross strengthened the team. Alessandro Iandoli advanced to the first team from the U-21 team. Basel's biggest pre-season signings were Bernt Haas, who was loaned in from West Bromwich Albion, Julio Hernán Rossi transferred in from Lugano, goalkeeper Eric Rapo came in from and Antonio Esposito from St. Étienne.

Six pre-season test games were planned for June and one for early July. The Nationalliga A season began on 6 July 2002 with an away game against Aarau, and the Champions League qualifying started on 31 July with an away tie against Žilina. In the Swiss Cup, all the league teams had a bye and qualified for the round of 32, which was to take place on 22 February 2003.

=== Winter break ===
During January 2003, George Koumantarakis left the club and transferred to English team Preston North End, who at that time played in the English Championship.

== Campaign ==
=== Friendly games ===
Basel started the season off with various warm-up matches. Their opponents included teams from the Swiss lower league, a team from Brazil, and PSV Eindhoven of the Netherlands. During the summer, Basel visited a training camp in America and played three matches against teams from the USL Premier Development League and Major League Soccer. Basel entered the Sempione Cup, which was played in Balsthal. The club won the first match against Austrian team SK Rapid Wien 3–0 and the second against Slovak team Inter Bratislava 2–0. Basel were placed second in the final classification.

=== Domestic league ===
==== Qualifying round ====
The Swiss Football Association (ASF-SFV) were changing the format of the domestic league during the season. Since the 1987–88 Nationalliga A season there had been 24 teams in the Nationalliga, 12 in the Nationalliga A and 12 in the Nationalliga B. In the first stage, there was a qualifying phase played as a double round-robin tournament. Three points were given for a victory and one for a draw. In the second phase, the top eight clubs played a further double round-robin for the championship; each team took half of the points and rounded up to complete units from the qualification round into the second stage as bonus. The last eight teams played against relegation to the amateur league and the last four teams from the top-level played a promotion/relegation round for the top tier in the following season. This was to be the last season in this format. The new format would reduce the number of clubs to 20, with ten teams in the top tier and ten in the second tier. Therefore, this year there was an additional relegation.

The season started well for Basel and they were undefeated in their first seven matches, winning five and drawing two. FCB lost the two following games and slipped seven points behind the Grasshoppers who in the same period had won eight of their nine games. Despite defeating GC on match day 10 in their own Hardturm stadium the following weekend, the rivals remained clear in the ranking. Gross regrouped his team and they won nine and drew two of the following eleven games, catching and overtaking their rivals in the table. A 1–2 home defeat against GC on match day 21 cost FCB the lead. Grasshoppers ended the league qualifying stage as table leaders at the winter break with 49 points, two points clear.

==== Championship round ====
In the championship playoff round Basel only lost two away games, winning 10 of 14 games. Despite this, because both direct ties against the Grasshoppers were drawn, the Zurich-based club managed to snatch the title by a single point at the end of the season. The Grasshoppers remained undefeated in the championship group and ended the season with 57 points. Basel were second with 56, 21 points ahead of third placed Xamax. As champions, GC qualified for the 2003–04 Champions League third qualifying round. As runners-up, Basel qualified for the UEFA Cup first round.

In the home match in St. Jakob-Park on 19 April 2003, Hakan Yakin had a good game and scored a perfect hat-trick during the first half of the game as Basel won 3–0 against Young Boys. Yakin showed his other side in the return match in the Stadion Neufeld in Bern one week later. As Young Boys went a goal up, Yakin lost his temper and kicked the ball away, thus collecting a yellow card. Just ten minutes later he committed a rough foul, collecting a second yellow card. By rule, a player that receives two yellow cards in one game is issued a red card and ejected for the remainder of the match, so Yakin was dismissed.

=== Domestic cup ===
As cup holders the club's aim was to defend the trophy, or at minimum to reach the final, because the final would be played in their home stadium St. Jakob-Park. In the cup, all the league teams had a bye for the early rounds and started in the fifth round, which was scheduled for February. Here they were seeded and could not play against each other. In a match, the home advantage was granted to the team from the lower league, if applicable. Basel were drawn against lower league Yverdon-Sport.

==== Yverdon-Sport (22 February 2003) ====
The match was held at Stade Municipal in Yverdon-les-Bains and had an attendance of 2,800 fans. After a foul from Gil Bala on Hervé Tum inside the area, Mario Cantaluppi converted the subsequent spot-kick in the 16th minute. Basel controlled the game and could have gone further ahead in the 29th minute, but Julio Hernán Rossi's shot rebounded from the post. In the fortieth minute, Cantaluppi scored his second goal. Following the goal celebrations Rossi was shown a red card for unsportsmanlike behavior. Despite having one man less on the field, Basel dominated the second period and Carlos Varela had a shot against the cross bar. One minute before time Timothée Atouba scored following a set piece to make the final score 3–0 for the visitors.

==== Servette (4 March 2003) ====
In the round of 16, Basel was drawn against Servette and played at home in the St. Jakob-Park with an attendance of 10,721 spectators. The match was played on level terms and possession was even for the first half-hour. Basel then increased the tempo and pushed the visitors back, creating two good chances, but Christian Giménez failed with both opportunities. Following a corner-kick Basel was awarded a penalty, which was converted by Mario Cantaluppi in the 35th minute. After the break, FCB pushed forward with Giménez and Julio Hernán Rossi often outrunning the defense. After one such move in the 51st minute, Scott Chipperfield was played into position, and his left footed shot gave the team a two-goal lead. Following this, Basel controlled the game, occasionally using their speed, but content to control the ball and the play. The match ended with a 2–0 win for the home team.

==== Young Boys (26 March 2003) ====
In the quarter-finals, FCB were drawn away against Young Boys. The match took place in the sold out Stadion Neufeld in Bern in front of 10,700 spectators. Despite two early goals from Christian Giménez in the 2nd and 28th minute, YB picked up and turned the game and took the lead. Gürkan Sermeter scored his first goal in the 38th minute, and his second in the 42nd. To make things worse for Basel, Varela picked up two yellow cards during the first half and was dismissed. The score was level as the teams went into the interval, but YB had a one-man advantage. After the break, YB continued their forward pressing and Sermeter completed his hattrick in the 55th minute. Basel then created two good chances. The first went wide of Paolo Collaviti's goal and the second, a header from Murat Yakin, was pushed against the cross bar by Collaviti, but Hervé Tum was in place to sink the rebound from close range. The score remained level at 3–3 at the end of regular time. Hakan Yakin scored the deciding goal and Basel won 4–3 after extra time.

==== Schaffhausen (15 April 2003) ====
Basel were drawn against lower-league club Schaffhausen in the semi-final. Again, FCB were able to play at home in St. Jakob-Park, which had an attendance of 26,960 spectators. Basel dominated the play from early in the game and the Schaffhausen defence had problems. In the 5th minute Mario Cantaluppi's shot rebounded from the post. In the 7th minute, Julio Hernán Rossi scored, but the goal was disallowed due to a player in an offside position. The Schaffhausen defenders Leu and Fehr were both shown yellow card within the first 23 minutes. In the 26th minute, Antonio Esposito put the home team one goal up. Basel continued to dominate the game but were content to control the ball and play and not to endanger their defense. Yet as the second period ticked away, it became evident that the FCB players were becoming frustrated because they could not add another goal. Scott Chipperfield and Esposito were both shown yellow cards because of this. Jean-Michel Tchouga netted in the 70th minute, but the goal was disallowed due to reckless play. Eventually the team got their second goal in the 90th minute, with Hervé Tum slotting the ball home from the edge of the area. Two minutes later, Esposito netted his second goal and the team's third. Basel advanced as Schaffhausen were defeated.

==== Neuchâtel Xamax (11 May 2003) ====
The 78th cup final was played in St. Jakob-Park. It was sold out with 31,500 spectators. The final was played between FCB and Xamax; it was a one-sided affair. Benjamin Huggel scored the first goal in the 13th minute, initiating the early demise of Xamax. Christian Gimenez scored two goals within eight minutes in the 35th and 43rd minute, effectively deciding the game before the break. In the 65th minute, as Murat Yakin slotted home the fourth, following a rebound out of the area from the completely overwhelmed Xamax defence, any doubts about the outcome of the game were wiped out. Boris Smiljanic scored in the 77th minute and Sébastien Barberis followed suit in the 83rd minute, scoring the last two goals in the highest cup final score since GC's 10–0 win over Lausanne in 1937. FC Basel achieved their seventh cup victory. The win meant FCB achieved qualification to the UEFA Cup first round.

=== Champions League ===
==== Qualifying rounds ====
===== Žilina =====
In the second qualifying round of the Champions League, Basel were drawn against Slovak club Žilina, and after a 1–1 draw in the first leg, came away with a 4–1 win on aggregate. The first leg was played in the Štadión pod Dubňom in Žilina on 31 July 2002. Miroslav Barčík put the home team a goal up after just 29 minutes, but Basel then put on the pressure and Marián Klago could not help but score an own goal just nine minutes later. In the return leg in St. Jakob-Park on 7 August 2002 Basel played a better and faster game. Christian Giménez put them a goal ahead after just 11 minutes and Murat Yakin doubled their lead 12 minutes later. Basel then controlled the game. It was again Giménez who netted soon after half-time and, from here on, the game seemed to be settled. Vladimír Staš scored a consolation goal for the visitors ten minutes from time.

===== Celtic =====
In the third qualifying round, Basel faced Scottish giants Celtic on 14 August. In the first leg, away at Celtic Park, the home side won 3–1. After just 92 seconds, Christian Giménez stunned the home crowd with a goal for the visitors. Murat Yakin slid a nice pass through to striker Gimenez, who pushed the ball under the advancing goalkeeper Rab Douglas. However, Celtic equalized a few seconds later from the penalty spot. Swedish international Henrik Larsson played a pass between the defenders through to Stilian Petrov, who was fouled by Swiss international Marco Zwyssig. The Swede himself stepped forward and shot his penalty kick past Pascal Zuberbühler into the bottom corner of the goal. The teams were level until, in the second half, Celtic applied more pressure. Chris Sutton missed his first chance, but he put the home team ahead just two minutes later. Basel reacted and had a few chances, but Celtic held their lead and, two minutes from time, Mohammed Sylla hit a fine volley to give Celtic their victory.

The second leg at St. Jakob-Park was on 28 August. Basel started the game at a high tempo and Celtic could have been a goal behind after just three minutes, but midfielder Paul Lambert stretched his leg out to block a close range shot from Ivan Ergic. Celtic was caught out by the pace and a clever move from the home side in the eighth minute. Hakan Yakin had the ball played to him as he ran to the goal line and he then played a left-footed reverse pass to split the visiting defense, allowing Christian Giménez to race through and his right-footed shot passed below goalkeeper Rab Douglas. The Glasgow side could have leveled soon after, but Henrik Larsson's firm header went straight into Basel keeper Pascal Zuberbuhler's arms from just five yards out. Celtic started the match with an unfamiliar back four and with four midfielders. Without the extra width provided by their normal 3-5-2 formation, they lacked their usual threat when going forward. The home team, backed by a noisy capacity crowd, had their heads up and they were soon rewarded with another goal. Murat Yakin jumped higher than both Bobo Baldé and Ulrik Laursen to head home a corner kick after 22 minutes. Celtic made two substitutions at half time, Didier Agathe and Steve Guppy coming on to play on the flanks in their usual formation and the Scots were immediately on the offensive. First a deflected shot from Stilian Petrov went narrowly wide, then Henrik Larsson's shot was blocked. Celtic were denied a goal by the resolute Basel defense. With determination and drive, Celtic were in charge of the game for long periods in the second half. However, they struggled to create good goal-scoring chances. Chris Sutton's header made at the near post was easily saved by goalkeeper Pascal Zuberbühler and a wide range shot from Mohammed Sylla was harmless and easily dealt with by the keeper as well. Substitute John Hartson had the best chance in the 71st minute, but Zuberbuhler's right hand blocked the close-range header. In the final minute of added time, a Sutton shot passed just inches wide of the left goalpost, but this was the end of the Celtic siege on the Swiss side's goal. Basel were able to rescue the tie in the return match, coming away with a 2–0 victory, to draw 3–3 on aggregate. Basel thus proceeded to the group stage on the away goals rule.

Basel's success saw them become only the second Swiss team ever to play in the modern Champions League. Celtic's defeat meant that they would continue in the 2002–03 UEFA Cup, entering in the First round and eventually progressing to the final.

==== First group stage ====
===== Spartak =====
In the group stage Basel were drawn in Group B along with Valencia, Liverpool and Spartak Moscow. Match day 1 of the group stage gave Basel a home match against Spartak Moscow on 17 September cheered on by a sell-out crowd of close to 30,000. Julio Hernán Rossi gave Spartak their first scare in the 15th minute as he sent a header into the net past Stanislav Cherchesov, but Basel's Argentine striker was ruled offside. In the 23rd minute, Murat Yakin headed the ball against the post after a corner. Thirty seconds later his younger brother, Hakan Yakin, had his first chance, but he headed the ball just wide of Cherchesov's goal. In the 43rd minute, Hakan was again on target with a bicycle kick, but keeper Cherchesov caught it. After the half-time break, Basel were still showing that they were in control. In the 50th minute, Hakan Yakin put FC Basel on the path to victory, latching on to Christian Eduardo Giménez's pass to shoot left-footed into the net. Five minutes later, Rossi was able to dribble around the Spartak defense and place his shot beyond keeper Cherchesov to give his team a two-goal lead. Rossi narrowly missed the goal as his header hit the crossbar in the 70th minute. The visitors were missing their injured captain, Yegor Titov, Basel dominated nearly all the match and had a number of near misses later in the match.

===== Liverpool =====
Basel traveled to Anfield on match day 2 on 25 September to claim a 1–1 draw against Liverpool. Above everything, the noise created by the 3,500 Basel fans among the 37,634 spectators before, during and after the match remains one of the most memorable things about this match. Liverpool were quickly into the game and created two or three good chances in the first quarter of an hour, but they were only warming up the Basel goalkeeper Pascal Zuberbühler, who was having a good day. The visitors then battled back into the game, but the home team remained in charge. Liverpool's new signing Milan Baroš scored with his first attempt on goal in the 34th minute and this was to be the only time that Zuberbühler was beaten. Julio Hernán Rossi equalized shortly before the break from the only really good chance that the visitors created. Liverpool pressed for the win in the second half, but whenever central defenders Alexandre Quennoz or Murat Yakin made a mistake, keeper Zuberbühler stood firm on the line to save the day for his team.

===== Valencia =====
It rained all day on 2 October on Spain's south-eastern coast, and minutes before kick-off in the Valencia-Basel match in the half full Mestalla Stadium, it started to pour. It poured throughout the entire game. The hosts coped better with the conditions, keeping the ball in the air and off the soggy ground. Hardly properly organized and struggling through the countless pools of water spread over the pitch, Basel's game was hopelessly lost and very soon all focus was on damage limitation. It was a thankless and difficult task for the visitors against the rampant Spaniards, who kept the ball and opponents running. John Carew in the 10th and again in the 14th minute put the hosts two goals up. Fábio Aurélio added the third after 17 minutes and Rubén Baraja added the fourth even before the match was half an hour old. Playing without self-confidence, the Basel forwards never threatened goalkeeper Santiago Cañizares throughout the first half.

Only after the break and some clear words from coach Christian Gross were the FCB players able to absorb something. Carlos Varela came on for defender Timothée Atouba and he appeared alone in front of Cañizares after just a few seconds. The Spanish International keeper managed to clear, but was powerless against Julio Hernán Rossi's quick reaction second shot. But the locals quickly shifted their attention to the other side. Miguel Ángel Angulo hit the lower edge of the bar in the 49th minute and Mista saw his shot cleared off the goal line by captain Murat Yakin, before it snuck in again behind the powerless Pascal Zuberbühler. Pablo Aimar and Mista made it 6–1 for the home team. The biggest FCB defeat in the European Cup after the 0–5 against Celtic Glasgow 38 years earlier seemed to be on its way. But thanks to the late strike by Hakan Yakin, at least this disgrace was averted. After two good results Basel were brought back down to earth by a 6–2 demolition against Valencia.

===== Valencia return match =====
However, Basel bounced back and held Valencia to a 2–2 draw on match day 4 in St. Jakob-Park three weeks later. Valencia had already qualified for the second group stage and played with a kind of B team and this time the FCB team was ready for the game. Basel controlled the game from the first minutes, not creating too many chances, but pinning the visitors into their own half. Ivan Ergić eventually put the home team a goal up in the 32nd minute. But Valencia reacted immediately and only four minutes later Rubén Baraja leveled the score. In the second half the visitors were more in charge and after 72 minutes Curro Torres put them ahead. This time the home team reacted and played good moves towards captain and keeper Santiago Cañizares who had to deal with a few dangerous shots. However, he was beaten by an Ergić shot in the last minute of regular time and the added injury time passed without a change in the score.

===== Spartak return match =====
Basel had slipped from second place in the group to third, as Liverpool had won both games against Spartak. Basel needed to win at least one of their last two games and needed Liverpool to fail to pick up more than two points. In match day five, Liverpool lost 1–0 to Valencia and Basel played away against Spartak at the Luzhniki Stadium. Basel started well into the match, but had a shock as Antonio Esposito injured himself in the early minutes and was replaced by Timothée Atouba. Nevertheless, they did not lose their concentration and Julio Hernán Rossi put them one up after 18 minutes. Spartak then had more of the game pressing forward but not really troubling the Basel back four. In total they had five corner kicks and 12 attempts at goal. Basel played looking for counter-attacks, but were caught off-side 11 times. Two minutes before the end of time the counter-attack was well played and Christian Giménez went clear to put the ball past keeper Maksym Levytskyi to secure the 2–0 victory.

===== Liverpool return match =====
Basel were in second place in the group table, but their place in the last 16 was all but secured - all they had to do was to make sure they did not lose to Liverpool in the last game of the first group stage. Basel prepared themselves for this match with a training camp in the Black Forest, where the schedule was composed of videos, lectures and quizzing of the players. The team must have felt they were being introduced into a cult and if so, they emerged from this with enthusiasm and eagerness of true believers. Liverpool, on the other hand, were initially engulfed by a crisis of faith. The Liverpool coach Gérard Houllier's strategy proved to be founded on a slight misconception and knowing that he had to win, he persuaded himself that he could afford to leave out the calm player Salif Diao in the interests of fielding a more expressive line-up from the beginning.

The game began for Liverpool in the worst possible manner. In the second minute, Danny Murphy lost the ball to Antonio Esposito, who immediately beat the offside trap with a well played diagonal pass to Hakan Yakin. Yakin's low, but fast cross ball bounced inconveniently in the middle of the penalty area, but the quick thinking Julio Hernan Rossi, who had also scored at Anfield, converted Yakin's pass perfectly. The only Liverpool effort to be remembered in the first half was a good drive by Emile Heskey that Pascal Zuberbühler tipped over the crossbar after 10 minutes. A superb move resulted in Basel's second goal. Rossi moved to the right and then played a square pass towards Christian Giménez. The Liverpool back four just watched in awe as Giménez burst through to take the ball and nip it past keeper Jerzy Dudek. In the 29th minute, Dudek parried Yakin's free-kick, only for Timothée Atouba to net the rebound. The home supporters were singing loudly before the goal and after it the noise was deafening and never ending. Basel's attacks were damaging Liverpool reputations decisively and the visitors were especially ineffective in the midfield area.

Liverpool fought back, but the road to parity was steep. However, Liverpool climbed it well with purpose and strength as the Basel team became tired. Salif Diao came in for a poor Steven Gerrard and he restored the team order and, after an hour, began the build-up that saw Murphy finish accurately after being neatly teed up by midfielder Vladimir Smicer. Smicer then added a goal of his own after 64 minutes, stretching himself to the limit to force home a pass from Milan Baros. As Murat Yakin then handled a low ball on the ground, with Michael Owen swerving past him, there was almost euphoria. Owen himself took the penalty, Zuberbühler blocked it but Owen pushed in the loose ball. Nevertheless, the home crowd were still singing their songs very loud and the score remained at 3–3 right up until the final whistle. Basel thus qualified for the next round.

As third placed team in the group, Liverpool continued in the 2002–03 UEFA Cup and entered in the final phase. Here they would advance to the Quarter-finals, where they were drawn against and knocked out by Celtic, who, in their turn, were to advance to the final to play against Porto.

==== Second group stage ====
In the round of 16, Basel was drawn into group D together with Manchester United, Juventus and Deportivo de La Coruña. Basel were now quite renowned for their early pressing and their goals in the opening minutes. They had achieved an early goal against Žilina, one in both games against Celtic, as well as one against Spartak Moscow, before their second-minute goal against Liverpool. In addition to this, they also achieved an early lead in eight of their 20 domestic league matches up until this time, so the opponents were warned.

===== Manchester United =====
As expected the match day 1 game on 26 November 2002 between Manchester United and Basel started extraordinarily fast. Immediately after the kick-off, Basel's Julio Hernán Rossi sprinted into the United penalty area and forced a clearance from Wes Brown, after Basel captain Murat Yakin had played a precise long ball. Hakan Yakin curled in the corner ball and Rossi placed a fine header low, near the goalpost. This was brilliantly headed off the line by Quinton Fortune. But the ball landed by Scott Chipperfield and his fierce shot was deflected in by Christian Giminez past the helpless Fabien Barthez after just 31 seconds. Sir Alex Ferguson looked on in disgust from the sidelines, he had warned his players. Hakan Yakin was denied the second goal after he ran amok, dribbling around the United defenders, turning them inside out. Just one minute later he did it again and set up Rossi, whose shot was saved in extremis by keeper Barthez. Not even one minute later Juan Verón gave the ball away to Gimenez, and didn't make much effort to get it back, and the goal-scorer tried to chip Barthez. As the Frenchman back-pedaled furiously, the ball landed on the roof of the goal. Basel remained in control and Paul Scholes was lucky to get away with just a yellow card after he first fouled Hakan Yakin and then Mario Cantaluppi. Seconds after the booking, Scholes lunged in again with a terribly clumsy tackle on Ivan Ergić and he remained very fortunate not to have been sent off. After the break United were better. A fine cross from Ole Gunnar Solskjær was met nicely by Ruud van Nistelrooy's forehead and the ball ended in the net. One minute later van Nistelrooy struck again. From the narrowest of angles, because he was on the by-line, he slotted the ball past Pascal Zuberbühler in the Basel goal. Six minutes later Solskjaer added his own name to the scorers' list with a low hard shot between Zubi's legs. The game was decided at this moment and Basel suffered a 1–3 defeat.

===== Juventus =====
After heavy snowfall in and around Turin, the day 2 game on 11 December suffered from the poor pitch and in the early stages also from heavy fog. The hosts Juventus took a 1–0 lead after a header relay between Mark Iuliano and David Trezeguet in the 3rd minute. However, the Swiss were able to recover quickly from the early deficit and dominated the game for the next quarter of an hour, but Christian Giménez in particular was unable to take advantage of the chances they had created. The Italians were back almost as if at the push of a button and appeared dangerous time and again in front of the box of Basel goalkeeper Pascal Zuberbühler. In the 34th minute, just as Basel seemed to be getting the better, Paolo Montero was spot on and dusted off to make it 2–0. Zuberbühler was only able to parry an Alessandro Del Piero free kick. Shortly before the end of the first half, Alessio Tacchinardi's long-range shot meant Juventus went into the break 3-0 up. The second half also saw Basel going forward, but the Italians scored the next goal. Pavel Nedvěd fell in the penalty area, referee Lucílio Batista imposed a disputed penalty, and Del Piero made it 4–0. At least one cannot blame Basel of giving up - The outsider fought continued to look for their chance to get at least a consolation goal. However, their fast counterattacks mostly came to an end at the edge of the penalty area, and the final pass rarely reached its goal with the vigilant Juve defense. Shots from a distance were never a problem for goalkeeper Gianluigi Buffon. The result was an unpleasant 0–4 defeat for Basel.

===== Deportivo =====
The game on day 3 was after the winter break, on 19 February 2003 with Basel at home in the St. Jakob-Park against Deportivo de La Coruña. Again the match started fast and Christian Gross's Basel team made attempts for an early goal. However, Javier Irureta's Deportivo could have taken the lead twice. Basel captain Murat Yakin together with midfielder Mario Cantaluppi were able to calm things down and Basel took control of the match after about 15 minutes and they pressed forwards. However, it wasn't until the 30th minute that they had their first really good chance, Christian Giménez failed against goalkeeper Juanmi. Only a few seconds later Hakan Yakin also had a chance at goal and he put the hosts 1-0 up. From here on the game was very tactical, neither team wanting to make a mistake. Basel could have increased their lead two or three times, and Deportivo could have equalised, but weren't as commanding. The game ended with victory for the home team and they managed to give themselves hope of reaching the quarter-finals.

===== Deportivo return match =====
The return match was played just six days later on 25 February in Estadio Riazor in A Coruña. Deportivo were again ready for the quick starting visitors, whose first chance in the second minute was blocked. Again Basel came forward, but the chance was foiled early and the hosts had a well played counterattack. Diego Tristán ran clear and was able to put his side a goal up in the fourth minute. Deportivo then controlled their defensive area, allowing Basel freedom in mid-field. The match was played tactically by the home side and the visitors, with their goalkeeper Pascal Zuberbühler as captain for the injured Murat Yakin, could not find the space that they would have liked against the well defending opponents. During the early minutes of the second period Basel created their best chances, but it soon became apparent that they were tiring. Deportivo controlled the last twenty-odd minutes easily and won the game 1–0, which left them third in the table with four points, above their opponents who had just three points.

===== Manchester United return match =====
Arguably two of Basel's greatest ever European games, up until now, came next. First, they held Manchester United to a 1–1 draw at Old Trafford on 12 March. Despite having achieved just one victory and having scored only two goals in the first four matches of the second group stage, Basel were only a point behind the duo Deportivo and Juventus. Victory over United, who had already assured their automatic qualification for the knock-out stage, would set up an epic finish as Basel would entertain Juventus for the last match of the group. Head coach Christian Gross had been thorough with his planning before the trip to Manchester. The team flew early to England, on the day after their weekend league win over Servette, to avoid the temptation of a player's visit to the local Fasnacht.

Well over 3,000 Basel fans travelled to support their team in the Theatre of Dreams; 23 charter planes arrived at Manchester airport that day alone. The entire fan block was in their sector, singing and chanting, well over an hour before kick-off. The Basel team, being pushed on by their fans, started fast and furious, creating three early chances before United had their first. In the 14th minute, Christian Giménez controlled a cross with this chest and right footed a volley beyond keeper Roy Carroll, who played in place of regular goalie Fabien Barthez. United tried to react, but failed in their attempt to pressurise the Basel defense, and it was the guests who were dominating the match. Manager Alex Ferguson had also given the regulars David Beckham, Ruud van Nistelrooy, Ryan Giggs and Paul Scholes a break by leaving them on the Bench, at the same time giving Kieran Richardson his debut for the team. The United manager was getting increasingly irritated by the team's performance and at half time he brought on Giggs. In the 53rd minute, a wide ranged, left-footed shot from captain Gary Neville was unluckily deflected beyond Zuberbühler to level the score. But, despite this, Basel were playing better and closer to taking the lead again. Ferguson reacted in the 73rd minute — he brought on Beckham and Scholes in an attempt to win the match. During the last few minutes Basel had another two or three chances but the final score remained 1–1.

===== Juventus return match =====
The situation before match day six of this second group stage was clear. United were group winners and Juventus were three points clear of the duo Basel and Deportivo, Basel needed at least a four-goal victory at St. Jakob-Park on 18 March to overtake their match day opponents and go through to the next round. Referee was the German Wolfgang Stark and the stadium was sold-out with over 30,500 spectators. The Italians had the better start and on ten minutes, broke through; Cristian Zenoni fed Alessio Tacchinardi, whose left-footed long range shot gave keeper Pascal Zuberbühler no chance. This only doubled Basel's determination and they reacted well and put on the pressure immediately, having two good chances within a short time. Hakan Yakin, with a clever chip, forced keeper Gianluigi Buffon to tip the ball wide of the post and he also had to save a shot from Scott Chipperfield. After 38 minutes Basel were deservedly level. A sloppy clearance from Mark Iuliano was caught and pushed on by Christian Giménez and Mario Cantaluppi reacted quickly to volley home his first Champions League goal. Hakan Yakin again forced Buffon to make another fine save so that Juventus could hold on before half-time. In the second period Basel continued to dominate the match. Sébastien Barberis' shot, just three minutes into the second half, went narrowly over the bar. Juventus continued to defend their area in numbers, but, at the other end, Pavel Nedved remained a threat. Swiss international Hakan Yakin had a good chance as he pounced on a poor clearance in front of goal from Lilian Thuram, but a quick reacting Iuliano ensured that Yakin could not get full contact. Basel went even closer following a corner after 67 minutes, but a Giménez header hit the crossbar. Juventus looked stronger after this, but in the second and final minute of added time, Basel forced their tenth corner. Cantaluppi's corner kick was flicked on by Chipperfield and Giménez volleyed the ball over the line and his side claimed a 2–1 victory.

==== Conclusion ====
The victory meant that Basel finished the second group stage level on points with Juventus and Deportivo La Coruña. In the six games between the three teams level, Juventus' better points tally meant that they went on to the quarter-finals. The season's Champions League run earned the club well over 20 million Swiss Francs in performance bonuses. This additional revenue is well shy of the finances of teams such as Real Madrid, Juventus or Manchester United.

== Club staff ==
=== Management ===
Position	Staff
Manager	(Switzerland) Christian Gross
Assistant manager	(Switzerland) Fritz Schmid
Fitness coach	(Switzerland) Harry Körner
Goalkeeper coach	(Switzerland) Thomas Grüter
Goalkeeper coach	(Switzerland) Romain Crevoisier
Team manager	(Germany) Oliver Kreuzer
Team administrator	(Switzerland) Gustav Nussbaumer
U-21 coach	(Switzerland) Heinz Hermann
U-21 co-coach	(Switzerland) Pascal Burger

Last updated: July 2002
Source: FC Basel Marketing AG (2003). "Rotblau: FC Basel 1893, Das Magazin". Rotblau. FC Basel Marketing AG. ISSN 1660-0878.

=== Other information ===
Chairman	(Switzerland) Werner Edelmann
Ground (capacity and dimensions)	St. Jakob-Park (33,433 / 120x80 m)

Source: Homepage FCB

== Players ==
=== First team squad ===
The following is the list of the Basel first team squad. It includes all players that were in the squad the day the season started on 6 July 2002 but subsequently left the club after that date and it includes all players that transferred in during the season.

Note: Flags indicate national team as defined under FIFA eligibility rules; some limited exceptions apply. Players may hold more than one non-FIFA nationality.

No.	Pos.	Nation	Player
1	GK	SUI	Pascal Zuberbühler
4	DF	SUI	Alexandre Quennoz
5	DF	SUI	Marco Zwyssig
6	MF	SUI	Benjamin Huggel
7	FW	SUI	Antonio Esposito
8	FW	ESP	Carlos Varela
9	MF	RSA	George Koumantarakis
10	MF	SUI	Hakan Yakin
11	FW	CAM	Hervé Tum
12	MF	SUI	Sébastien Barberis
13	FW	ARG	Christian Eduardo Giménez
15	DF	SUI	Murat Yakin
16	DF	SUI	Grégory Duruz

No.	Pos.	Nation	Player
17	MF	SUI	Mario Cantaluppi
18	GK	SUI	Eric Rapo
19	FW	SUI	Marco Streller
20	DF	SUI	Bernt Haas
21	FW	CAM	Jean-Michel Tchouga
22	MF	SCG	Ivan Ergić
23	MF	SUI	Philipp Degen
24	DF	CAM	Timothée Atouba
26	MF	AUS	Scott Chipperfield
28	MF	AUS	Ljubo Miličević
30	DF	SUI	Boris Smiljanić
33	FW	ARG	Julio Hernán Rossi
—		SUI	Alessandro Iandoli (U-21)

=== Players who left club during season ===
Note: Flags indicate national team as defined under FIFA eligibility rules; some limited exceptions apply. Players may hold more than one non-FIFA nationality.

No.	Pos.	Nation	Player
19	FW	SUI	Marco Streller (on loan to (Switzerland) Thun from 30 Sept. to 31 Dec. 2002 and 2 April to 30 June 2003)
—	DF	SUI	Philippe Cravero (loan to Servette for one year with option to buy)

No.	Pos.	Nation	Player
21	FW	CMR	Jean-Michel Tchouga (to FC Lugano)

=== Transfers ===
==== Summer ====
===== In =====
Note: Flags indicate national team as defined under FIFA eligibility rules; some limited exceptions apply. Players may hold more than one non-FIFA nationality.

No.	Pos.	Nation	Player
18	GK	SUI	Eric Rapo (from Wil – n/a)
33	FW	ARG	Julio Hernán Rossi (from Lugano – n/a)
16	DF	SUI	Grégory Duruz (from FC Sion – n/a)
7	FW	SUI	Antonio Esposito (from St. Étienne)

No.	Pos.	Nation	Player
20	DF	SUI	Bernt Haas (on loan from West Bromwich Albion)
23	MF	SUI	Philipp Degen (advanced from Basel U-21)
28	MF	AUS	Ljubo Miličević (om loan from Zürich, loan)
—		SUI	Alessandro Iandoli (U-21)

===== Out =====
Note: Flags indicate national team as defined under FIFA eligibility rules; some limited exceptions apply. Players may hold more than one non-FIFA nationality.

No.	Pos.	Nation	Player
1	GK	SVK	Miroslav König (to Zürich)
2	DF	SUI	Massimo Ceccaroni (end of career)

==== Winter ====
===== Out =====
Note: Flags indicate national team as defined under FIFA eligibility rules; some limited exceptions apply. Players may hold more than one non-FIFA nationality.

No.	Pos.	Nation	Player
9	MF	RSA	George Koumantarakis (to Preston North End – n/a)

== Results ==
Legend

Win Draw Loss Postponed

=== Friendlies ===
==== Pre-season and first half-season friendlies ====
June 2002 Pre-season Exhibition game	Wil (Switzerland)	1–2	(Switzerland) Basel	Stadion Rüti, Henau SG
19:00	Lustrinelli 41' (1:1)	FCB summary	16' (0:1) Giménez; 61' (1:2) Rossi; (yellow card) 69' Barberis	Attendance: 2,100; Referee: (Switzerland) Reto Rutz (Amriswil)
Note: FCB without Zuberbühler, Zwyssig, Murat and Hakan Yakin, and Cantaluppi (all rested), Huggel (injured), and Koumantarakis (with South Africa at the World Cup). 9th minute: a shot from Fabinho hit the crossbar. 18th minute: a shot from Ergic hit the left post. 34th minute: Gimenez left the game with thigh problems.

13 June 2002 Pre-season	D.C. United (Washington) (United States)	1–4	(Switzerland) Basel	Maryland SoccerPlex, Germantown
16:00	Namoff 61' (1:3)	FCB summary	1' (0:1) Streller; 7' (0:2) H. Yakin; 60' (0:3) Savić; 67' (1:4) Giménez	Attendance: 500; Referee: (United States) Murphy
Note: Playing time 2x 35 minutes. D.C. United without Moreno (unused) and Pope (US national team). Basel without Cantaluppi, Atouba, Huggel (all injured), Meili (unused) and Koumantarakis (with South Africa at the World Cup).

15 June 2002 Pre-season	Chesapeake Dragons (United States)	2–8	(Switzerland) Basel	RFK Auxiliary Field, Washington, D.C.
17:30	Gibbons 16' (1:1); Pablo Graham 80' (2:8)	FCB summary	2' (0:1) Rossi; 17' (1:2) Giménez; 45' (1:3) Giménez; 48' (1:4) Streller; 51' (1:5) Tum; 67' (1:6) Tum; 74' (1:7) Iandoli; 75' (1:8) Tum	Attendance: 60; Referee: (United States) Riesch
Note: FCB without Atouba and Huggel (both injured), Koumantarakis (with South Africa at the World Cup), and Zuberbühler (did not play). 48th minute, a shot from Tum hit the post (Streller converted the rebound). In central midfield, FCB played with Hakan Yakin in an attacking role and Cantaluppi in a defensive role during the first half, while Ergić and Barberis played side-by-side in the second half. Quennoz played as right-back from the 46th minute onwards.

19 June 2002 Pre-season	New England Revolution (United States)	0–5	(Switzerland) Basel	N.E.R. Practice Field, Boston
11:30		FCB summary	14' (0:1) Giménez; 40' (0:2) Ergić; 49' (0:3) Tum; 71' (0:4) Tum; 83' (0:5) Tum	Attendance: 60; Referee: (United States) Badea
Note: New England Revolution without Llamosa (US national team), Twellman, Ralston, Heaps, Rooney, and Serna (all unused). FCB without Atouba, Huggel (both injured), and Meili (unused). 12th minute: a shot from Diallo hit the post; 32nd minute: a header from Murat Yakin hit the post.

22 June 2002 Sempione-Cup; Semi-final	Basel (Switzerland)	3–0	(Austria) SK Rapid Wien	Moos, Balsthal
20:00	Rossi 17' (1:0); Giménez 40' (2:0); Tum 85' (3:0)	FCB summary	(yellow card) 21' Adamski	Attendance: 1,700; Referee: (Switzerland) Guido Wildhaber (Kerzers)
Note: The Sempione Cup was a club tournament played in summer at Sportanlage Moos, Balsthal, during the years 1987 to 2004. FCB without Koumantarakis (special leave following the World Cup), Chipperfield (Oceania Cup with the Australian national team), and both Huggel and Atouba (injured). 39th minute: Feldhofer deflected a shot from Rossi onto his own goalpost. 39th minute: Varela left the game injured after a blow to his left outer ankle and was taken to the hospital for X-rays. For Basel, Barberis played right-back after coming on, with Degen returning to the position after the break; meanwhile, Hakan Yakin took over central playmaking duties from Ergic until he was substituted.

24 June 2002 Sempione-Cup; Final	Basel (Switzerland)	2–0	(Slovakia) Inter Bratislava	Moos, Balsthal
18:30	Tum 2' (1:0); Cravero (yellow card) 61'; H. Yakin 70' (2:0)	FCB summary		Attendance: 1,900; Referee: (Switzerland) Markus Nobs, (Wohlen)
Note: The Sempione Cup was a club tournament played in summer at Sportanlage Moos, Balsthal, during the years 1987 to 2004. without Koumantarakis (on holiday following WM), Chipperfield (Australian national team), Huggel, Varela, Hasler, and Atouba (all injured). 25th minute: a shot from Halenar hit the post.

2 July 2002 Pre-season	Basel (Switzerland)	2–1	(Brazil) Ituano Futebol Clube	Rankhof Stadium, Basel
19:30	Streller 45' (1:0); Tum 54' (2:1); H. Yakin (penalty missed) 69′	FCB summary	(yellow card) 44' Pierre; 48' (1:1) Vincius; (yellow card) 68' Lucio; (yellow card) 88' Humberto	Attendance: 3,480; Referee: (Switzerland) Claudio Circhetta (Muttenz)
Note: FCB without Huggel, Atouba, Varela, Cravero, and Rossi (all injured), as well as Chipperfield (Australia national team). In the 69th minute, Ituano goalkeeper André Luiz saved the penalty taken by Hakan Yakin following a foul. After the break, Basel played a 3–5–2 formation with Tum up front and Degen in right midfield.

9 July 2002 Friendly	Wangen b. O. (Switzerland)	2–2	(Switzerland) Basel	Sportplatz Chrüzmatt, Wangen bei Olten
19:00	Povigliaro 28' (1:0); Dannhäuser 90' (2:2)	FCB summary	31' (1:1) Koumantarakis; 54' (1:2) Savić	Attendance: 400; Referee: (Switzerland) Martin Salm (Veltheim, Aargau)
Note: FCB without Zuberbühler, M. and H. Yakin, Zwyssig, Rossi, Gimenez (all left out of the squad), Huggel and Atouba (both injured). Fair game, no yellow cards.

23 July 2002 Friendly	Basel (Switzerland)	2–2	(Netherlands) PSV Eindhoven	Rankhof Stadium, Basel
	Rossi 24' (1:0); Rossi 62' (2:1)	FCB summary (in German)	42' (1:1) van Bommel; 70' (2:2) van Bommel	Attendance: 2,380; Referee: (Switzerland) Guido Wildhaber (Kerzers)
Note: FCB without Huggel (injured), Savic and Streller (both U-20), and Gimenez, Ergic, Chipperfield and Murat Yakin (all left out of the squad). PSV without 39-year-old Dane Jan Heintze (not in the squad), van der Schaaf, Kezman and de Jong, as well as new head coach Guus Hiddink, who is not expected in Eindhoven until August 2. Fair game, no yellow cards.

==== Winter break and second half-season friendlies ====
21 January 2003 Winter break	1. FC Kaiserslautern (Germany)	2–1	(Switzerland) Basel	Betzenberg, Kaiserslautern, Germany
	Adzic 2' (1:0); Lokvenc 5' (2:0)	FCB Report	(penalty missed) 25′ H. Yakin; 45' (2:1) H. Yakin	Attendance: 5,000; Referee: (Germany) Volker Raquet
Note: Kaiserslautern without Lincoln, Dominguez, and Sforza (all injured). FCB without Ergic (recovering), Esposito (injured), and Koumantarakis (absent). 25th minute, H. Yakin missed the penalty kick awarded for a foul by shooting the ball wide. Fair game, no bookings. Tactical change, FCB switched to a "classic 4-4-2" formation from the 63rd minute.

24 January 2003 Winter break	Vitesse Arnhem (Netherlands)	1–1	(Switzerland) Basel	Sportpark Ijsselsingel, Rheden, Netherlands
	Amoah 22' (1:0)	FCB Report	61' (1:1) Huggel; (yellow card) Rossi	Attendance: 400; Referee: (Netherlands) Rene Temmink
Note: Vitesse without five injured regular players. FCB without the injured Esposito, Ergic, Cantaluppi and Milicevic (on loan to FC Thun?), as well as Gimenez, Rapo and Zwyssig, who did not feature. Gusti Nussbaumer was without his moustache (shaved off "forcibly" by the players). Barberis left the game after taking a blow to the nose. 56th minute, Varela hit the top edge of the crossbar with a volley.

29 January 2003 Winter break	Winterthur (Switzerland)	1–5	(Switzerland) Basel	Belek, Turkey
	Vogt 27' (1:2)	FCB Report	11' (0:1) Rossi; 13' (0:2) Chipperfield; 53' (1:3) H. Yakin; 34' (1:4) Rossi; 76' (1:5) Rossi	Attendance: 150
Note: The match was played as part of a trainings camp in Turkey. For FCB, Zuberbühler, Murat Yakin and Smiljanic were rested. There was torrential rain during the first 30 minutes, yet the pitch remained in excellent condition.

31 January 2003 Winter break	Partizan Belgrad (Federal Republic of Yugoslavia)	1–1	(Switzerland) Basel	Belek, Turkey
	Delbasic 75' (1:0)	FCB Report	89' (1:1) Tum	Attendance: 50; Referee: (Slovakia) Ladislav Gadosi
Note: The match was played as part of a trainings camp in Turkey. FCB without Rossi (thigh contusion), Haas (ankle capsule injury), Esposito, Ergic (both injured and returned to Switzerland), Gimenez, Quennoz, Rapo (unused). – 57th minute, a shot from Tum hit the post. 78th minute, there was a ten-minute match stoppage due to a power cut. Gusty winds throughout the match.

3 February 2003 Winter break	Sturm Graz (Austria)	3–1	(Switzerland) Basel	Belek, Turkey
	Szabics 7' (1:0); Mujiri 8' (2:0); (yellow card) 39' Bosnar; Rauter 86' (3:1)	FCB Report	42' (2:1) Giménez	Attendance: 80; Referee: (Slovakia) Ladislav Gadosi
Note: The match was played as part of a trainings camp in Turkey. FCB without Murat Yakin (thigh problems), Duruz (bruise), Hakan Yakin, Rapo (unused), Esposito and Ergic (both injured)- Sturm Graz without Amoah, amongst others. Tactival change, FCB fielded Smiljanic in central defense, Atouba at left-back, and Chipperfield on the left of midfield from the 46th minute. From the 72nd minute, they played with three defenders, with Rossi positioned behind the strikers Gimenez and Tum. 42nd minute: a shot from Gimenez hit the crossbar (he followed up by scoring from the rebound to make it 1–2); 54th minute: Cantaluppi hit the crossbar with a direct free-kick.

8 February 2003 Winter break	Basel (Switzerland)	4–0	(Switzerland) Aarau	Leichtathletikstadion St. Jakob, Basel
	Atouba 32' (1:0); Rossi 49' (2:0); Chipperfield 59' (3:0); Rossi 76' (4:0)	FCB Report		Attendance: 1,500; Referee: (Switzerland) Claudio Circhetta (Muttenz)
Note: FCB without M. Yakin (minor knee issues), Ergic and Esposito (both injured). FCA without Skrzypczak (injured). FCA mad eight substitutions at half time.

11 February 2003 Winter break	Bellinzona (Switzerland)	0–1	(Switzerland) Basel	Stadio Comunale, Bellinzona
		FCB Report	4' (0:1) Tum	Attendance: 300; Referee: (Switzerland) Massimo Busacca (Monte Carasso/Bellinzona)
Note: Bellinzona without Cavin and Gigantelli (both injured). FCB without Zuberbühler, Hakan Yakin, Cantaluppi and Haas (all on Swiss national team duty), Atouba (Cameroon national team), Chipperfield (Australia national team), and Murat Yakin, Ergic and Esposito (all injured), but included Brazilian trialist Edu in the squad. FCB’s roster featured youth players Sebastian Kollar, Petrit Frrokaj, and Bekim Halimi. Following his substitution in the 63rd minute, Frrokaj played as right-back for FCB, with Degen operating on the right side of mid-field and Barberis in the center. 70th minute, a shot from Gimenez hit the crossbar.

15 February 2003 Winter break Exhibition game	Basel (Switzerland)	0–3	(Switzerland) Zürich	Stadion Rankhof, Basel
14:30		FCB summary FCZ sunnary	42' (0:1) Bastida; 70' (0:2) Yasar; 74' (0:3) Guerrero	Attendance: 2,000; Referee: (Switzerland) Nicole Petignat (Courgenay)
Note: FCB without Quennoz, Esposito and Ergic (all injured). FCZ without König (Slovakia national team), Nef, Pallas, and Keller (all injured). 46th minute: Tactical change by FCB, Barberis moved to right-back following Varela’s substitution; Varela played in right midfield. 75th minute: Degen played in right midfield after coming on and FCB switched to a 4-4-1-1 formation. 78th minute: Yasar left the pitch with a foot injury following a foul by M. Yakin.

1 April 2003 Mid-season Exhibition game	SV Muttenz (Switzerland)	1–4	(Switzerland) Basel	Sportplatz Margelacker, Muttenz
19:00	Ulli 75' (1:4)	FCB summary	25' (0:1) Huggel; 43' (0:2) Tum; 56' (0:3) Huggel; 63' (0:4) Huggel	Attendance: 812; Referee: (Switzerland) Claudio Circhetta (Muttenz)
Note: Muttenz without Oeczan, Palazzoni, Babicic, Stohler, and Schmidiger (all injured), as well as Heimoz, Gotsch, and Weber (all absent). Basel without Zuberbühler, M. Yakin, Haas, H. Yakin, Cantaluppi, and Zwyssig (all with the Swiss national team), Rossi and Gimenez (both carrying minor foot knocks), and Ergic (injured). No bookings. Corners: 3–9 (1–6).

=== Nationalliga A ===
==== Qualification phase ====
The qualification round to the 2002–03 league season was contested by twelve teams. This phase began with one match on 3 July 2002, the others on 6 July, and was completed on 7 December. The eight teams at the top of the table at the end of the qualification stage were then to compete in the championship play-off round. The teams in ninth to twelfth position competed with the top four teams of the NLB in a promotion/relegation group to decide which two teams would play top tier next season, because the top-tier was to be reduced from twelve to ten clubs.

6 July 2002 Round 1	Aarau	0–1	Basel	Stadion Brügglifeld, Aarau
17:30	Chassot (yellow card) 16'	FCB summary FCA summary	19' (0:1) Giménez; (yellow card) 27' Tum; (yellow card) 58' Cantaluppi; (yellow card) 83' Koumantarakis	Attendance: 10,100; Referee: (Switzerland) Massimo Busacca (Monte Carasso/Bellinzona)
Note: FCA without Baldassarri (injured) and Mamadou Diarra (not yet eligible to play). FCA without Atouba, Huggel, Varela (all injured) and Chipperfield (Australian national team).

13 July 2002 Round 2	Basel	1–1	Xamax	St. Jakob-Park, Basel
19:30	Barberis 14' (1:0); Cantaluppi (yellow card) 20'; Giménez (yellow card) 30'	FCB summary	(yellow card) 15' Wiederkehr; (yellow card) 32' Chiquinho; (yellow card) 65' Portillo; 72' (1:1) Leandro	Attendance: 23,465; Referee: (Switzerland) Florian Etter
Note: FCB without Atouba and Huggel (both injured) and Chipperfield (national team duty), as well as Esposito and Duruz (not yet eligible to play). Xamax without Khlifi (injured).

17 July 2002 Round 3	Young Boys	1–1	Basel	Stadion Neufeld, Bern
19:30	Rochat (yellow card) 4'; Chapuisat 47' (1:0); Chapuisat (yellow card) 52'; Petrosyan (yellow card) 56'; Descloux (yellow card) 62'; Sermeter (yellow card) 89'	FCB summary	(penalty missed) 4' M. Yakin; (yellow card) 23' Esposito; (yellow card) 32' Cantaluppi; (yellow card) 33' Barberis; (yellow card) 36' Rossi; (yellow card) 42' Cravero; 90' (1:1) Giménez	Attendance: 10,700; Referee: (Switzerland) René Rogalla (Wallisellen)
Note: The Young Boys played their home games in the Stadion Neufeld after the Wankdorf Stadium was demolished in 2001 and the new Stadion Wankdorf was constructed on the same site. YB without Patrick, Mioc and Coubadja (all injured), and Rotanzi, Geiser, Fryand and Heverton (surplus foreign players). Basel without Varela, Hakan Yakin, Huggel, and Atouba (all injured), and Savic (surplus foreign player). 4th minute: Murat Yakin hit the crossbar with his penalty kick. 74th minute: a shot from Magnin hit the post.

20 July 2002 Round 4	Basel	1–0	Delémont	St. Jakob-Park, Basel
19:30	Ergić (yellow card) 24'; Giménez 80' (1:0)	FCB summary	(yellow card) 09' Kebe; (yellow card) 30' Nocita; (yellow card) 61' Selimi	Attendance: 21,929; Referee: (Switzerland) Nicole Petignat (Courgenay)
Note: FCB without Atouba, Huggel, and Tum (all injured). Delémont without Di Zenzo, Hushi, Klötzli, and Reimann (all injured). 44th minute: a header from Gimenez hit the crossbar. 57th minute, a headed goal from Ojong was disallowed for offside. 62nd minute: Delémont goalkeeper David Inguscio deflected a direct free-kick from Cantaluppi onto the crossbar.

27 July 2002 Round 5	St. Gallen	1–1	Basel	Espenmoos, St. Gallen
17:30	Barnetta 44' (1:0)	FCB summary	(red card) 43' Gross (head-coach, not on pitch); (yellow card) 59' M. Yakin; 76' (1:1) Rossi	Attendance: 11,300 (sold out); Referee: (Switzerland) Massimo Busacca (Monte Carasso/Bellinzona)
Note: St. Gallen without Chaile (suspended) as well as Oberli and Tato (both injured). Basel without Huggel and Savic (both injured). 43rd minute: Basel head-coach Christian Gross sent to the stands for dissent.

3 August 2002 Round 6	Basel	4–2	Servette	St. Jakob-Park, Basel
19:30	Varela (yellow card) 10'; Zwyssig 28' (1:0); Giménez 45' (2:0); H. Yakin 57' (pen. 3:0); Cantaluppi (yellow card) 75'; Esposito 93' (4:2)	FCB summary	(yellow card) 25' Gaspoz; (yellow card) 38' O. Londono; (yellow card) 49' M. Lombardo; 60' (3:1) A. Frei; (yellow card) 75' Fournier; 78' (3:2) Gaspoz; (yellow card) 84' Thurre	Attendance: 23,257; Referee: (Switzerland) Guido Wildhaber (Kerzers)
Note: FCB without Koumantarakis, Huggel and Murat Yakin (all injured) as well as Streller (U-21). Servette without Jaquet (was ill), Bratic and Sanou (both injured). Cravero played his first match for Servette. 89th minute: a shot from Rossi hit the crossbar.

10 August 2002 Round 7	Zürich	0–4	Basel	Letzigrund, Zürich
19:30	Akalé (red card) 33'	FCB summary	8' (0:1) Giménez; 18' (0:2) H. Yakin; (yellow card) 24' Esposito; (yellow card) 28' D. Degen; 31' (0:3) Rossi; 45' (0:4) H. Yakin	Attendance: 10,500; Referee: (Switzerland) Carlo Bertolini (Vira-Gambarogno)
Note: FCZ ohne Keita, Guerrero und Milicevic (alle verletzt). FCB ohne Cantaluppi (gesperrt), Murat Yakin, Koumantarakis, Atouba, Chipperfield und Huggel (alle verletzt).

18 August 2002 Round 8	Basel	2–3	Luzern	St. Jakob-Park, Basel
19:30	Giménez 36' (1:1); Rossi 46' (2:1); M. Yakin (yellow card) 41' (yellow-red card) 67'; Quennoz (red card) 88'	FCB summary	(yellow card) 10' Monteiro; 12' (0:1) Monteiro; (yellow card) 22' Marić; (yellow card) 69' Koch; 85' (2:2) Malacarne; 88' (2:3) Enrique; (yellow card) 90+3' Arrué	Attendance: 23,257; Referee: (Liechtenstein) Roland Beck (Triesenberg)
Note: FCB without Chipperfield, Huggel, Ergic, Esposito and Zwyssig (all injured). FCL without Rothenbühler and Hofer (both injured) and Kawelaschwili (not yet eligible to play).

24 August 2002 Round 9	Thun	4–1	Basel	Stadion Lachen, Thun
17:30	Rama 46' (1:0); Baumann 65' (2:1); Rama 84' (3:1); Moser 86' (4:1)	FCB summary	51' (1:1) Tum	Attendance: 6,740; Referee: (Switzerland) Markus Nobs (Wohlen bei Bern)
Note: Marcus Nobs made his 100th NLA game as referee. Thun without Fahrni, Stettler and Parnela (all injured). FCB without Chipperfield, Ergic, Huggel and Zwyssig (all injured), Murat Yakin and Quennoz (both suspended), and Koumantarakis (not in the squad). 27th minute, a shot from Gimenez hit the crossbar. 32nd minute: Cantaluppi deflected the ball onto his own crossbar. 76th minute, a shot from Rossi hit the crossbar.

1 September 2002 Round 10	Grasshopper Club	2–3	Basel	Hardturm, Zürich
16:15	Barijo 7' (1:0); Borer (red card) 20'; Núñez 34' (2:1); Eduardo (yellow card) 33'; Tararache (yellow card) 39'; Castillo (yellow card) 66'	FCB summary	(yellow card) 14' Savić; (yellow card) 19' H. Yakin; 22' (pen. 1:1) Cantaluppi; (yellow card) 22' Cantaluppi; 45' (2:2) Giménez; 63' (2:3) M. Yakin; (yellow card) 90' M. Yakin	Attendance: 17,666 (sold out); Referee: (Switzerland) Philippe Leuba (Chexbres)
Note: GC without Spycher and Zanni (both injured). FCB without Chipperfield, Esposito, Huggel and Zwyssig (all injured). 40th minute: a goal by Gimenez was goal disallowed due an offside.

11 September 2002 Round 11	Basel	7–1	Wil	St. Jakob-Park, Basel
19:30	Giménez 8' (1:0); Cantaluppi 15' (2:1); Giménez 32' (3:1); Barberis 50' (4:1); Rossi 69' (5:1); Rossi 71' (6:1); M. Yakin 81' (7:1)	FCB summary	9' (pen. 1:1) Fabinho; (yellow card) 22' Rizzo; (yellow card) 33' T. Balmer	Attendance: 21,425; Referee: (Switzerland) Martin Salm (Veltheim, Aargau)
Note: FCB without Chipperfield, Huggel, Ergic, Duruz, Degen and Zwyssig (all injured). First match for FCB debut by Haas. Wil without Naldo (suspended).

14 September 2002 Round 12	Basel	4–0	Aarau	St. Jakob-Park, Basel
19:30	Giménez 5' (1:0); Giménez 54' (2:0); Esposito (yellow card) 51'; P. Degen (yellow card) 56'; Barberis 71' (3:0); M. Yakin 90+1' (4:0)	FCB summary FCA summary	(yellow card) 63' Pogatetz; (yellow card) 70' Diop; (yellow card) 90+1' Skrzypczak	Attendance: 25,385; Referee: (Switzerland) Guido Wildhaber (Kerzers)
Note: FCB without Chipperfield, Duruz, Ergic, Huggel, Varela, Philipp Degen and Zwyssig (all injured). FCA without Chassot (was ill), Baldassarri, Mamadou Diarra and Moretto (all injured).

21 September 2002 Round 13	Xamax	1–1	Basel	Stade de la Maladière, Neuchâtel
19:30	Leandro 48' (1:0)	FCB summary	(yellow card) 52' Esposito; (yellow card) 63' Cantaluppi; 82' (1:1) Barberis	Attendance: 9,600; Referee: (Switzerland) Nicole Petignat (Courgenay)
Note: Xamax without Wiederkehr, Portillo, and Mangane (all suspended), Khlifi (with Morocco's Olympic squad), and Tsawa (injured). FCB without Chipperfield, Ergic, Huggel, Zwyssig and Hakan Yakin (all injured) and Murat Yakin (stiff neck).

28 September 2002 Round 14	Basel	2–1	Young Boys	St. Jakob-Park, Basel
19:30	Duruz (yellow card) 15'; Cantaluppi (yellow card) 31'; Giménez 68' (1:1); Tum 68' (2:1); Varela (yellow card) 78'	FCB summary	22' (0:1) Sermeter; (yellow card) 23' Disler; (yellow card) 62' Magnin; (yellow card) 75' Descloux	Attendance: 29,762 (sold out); Referee: (Switzerland) Carlo Bertolini (Vira-Gambarogno)
Note: FCB without Quennoz, Huggel, Chipperfield and Rossi (all injured) and Esposito (suspended). YB without Denicolà, Patrick and Hänzi (all injured).

6 October 2002 Round 15	SR Delémont	1–2	Basel	La Blancherie, Delémont
16:15	Saidou Kébé 80' (1:2)	FCB summary	(yellow card) 28' Esposito; 36' (0:1) Tum; 60' (0:2) Rossi; (yellow card) 80' Cantaluppi	Attendance: 6,300 (stadion record); Referee: (Switzerland) Florian Etter
Note: Delémont without Ojong and Reimann (suspended), Sahin and Inguscio (injured). FCB without Huggel, Savic, Chipperfield (all injured), Murat Yakin and Hakan Yakin (rested). 69th minute: a shot from Rossi hit the crossbar.

19 October 2002 Round 16	Basel	6–0	St. Gallen	St. Jakob-Park, Basel
19:30	Rossi 14' (1:0); Rossi 31' (2:0); Giménez 45' (3:0); Rossi (yellow card) 67'; Rossi 80' (4:0); Tum 84' (5:0); Savić 90' (6:0)	FCB summary	(yellow card) 64' Alex; (yellow card) 68' Tato; (yellow card) 90+1' Colacino	Attendance: 27,599; Referee: (Switzerland) Markus Nobs (Wohlen bei Bern)
Note: FCB without Cantaluppi (suspended), Degen and Chipperfield (both injured), and Hakan Yakin (on the bench, rested). St. Gallen without Berger (suspended), Oberli (injured), and Lerinc (was ill).

25 October 2002 Round 17	Servette	0–1	Basel	Charmilles Stadium, Geneva
19:30	Senderos (yellow card) 3'; Thurre (yellow card) 55'; Gaspoz (yellow card) 93'	FCB summary	(yellow card) 24' Rossi; 51' (0:1) Ergić; (yellow card) 54' Varela; (yellow card) 59' Esposito	Attendance: 6,511; Referee: (Switzerland) Massimo Busacca (Monte Carasso/Bellinzona)
Note: Servette without Pascolo and Londono (both suspended) as well as Fournier, Frei and Vanetta (all injured). FCB without Cantaluppi (suspended) as well as Chipperfield and Gimenez (both injured).

1 November 2002 Round 18	Basel	5–3	Zürich	St. Jakob-Park, Basel
19:30	Ergić 4' (1:0); Rossi 41' (2:2); Ergić 45+3' (3:2); Rossi 55' (4:2); Varela 77' (5:3)	FCB summary FCZ summary	18' (1:1) Keller; 28' (1:2) Jefferson; (yellow card) 33' Iodice; 56' (og 4:3) (Zwyssig); (yellow card) 82' Jefferson; (yellow card) 90' Yasar	Attendance: 28,870; Referee: (Switzerland) Carlo Bertolini (Vira-Gambarogno)
Note: FCB without Chipperfield and Gimenez (both injured). FCZ without Chihab, Hellinga, Schneider and Tarone (all injured). 57th minute, a cross from Akale hit the outside of the post. 78th minute: Akale left the game due to an injury.

17 November 2002 Round 19	Luzern	1–1	Basel	Stadion Allmend, Luzern
14:30	Brand 33' (pen. 1:0); Rota (yellow card) 37' (red card) 55'; Hilfiker (yellow card) 72'; Kavelashvili (yellow card) 90'	FCB summary	(yellow card) 32' Zuberbühler; (yellow card) 67' Zwyssig; 82' (o.g. 1:1) (Zukic); (yellow card) 86' Haas	Attendance: 14,700; Referee: (Switzerland) René Rogalla (Wallisellen)
Note: FCL without Arrué, Monteiro, Mehmeti and Enrique (all injured). FCB without Varela, Hakan Yakin, Cantaluppi and Ergic (all injured). 6th minute: a goal by Atouba was disallowed for offside. 38th minute: a diect free-kick from Chipperfield hit the top of the crossbar.

22 November 2002 Round 20	Basel	3–0	Thun	St. Jakob-Park, Basel
19:30	H. Yakin 9' (1:0); Chipperfield (yellow card) 32'; Rossi 51' (2:0); Giménez 38' (3:0)	FCB summary	(yellow card) 45' Hodžić; (red card) 87' Deumi	Attendance: 30,501 (sold out); Referee: (Liechtenstein) Roland Beck (Triesenberg)
Note: FCB without Koumantarakis, Savic and Haas (all injured). Thun without Parnela, Heinz and Adrian Moser (all injured).

1 December 2002 Round 21	Basel	1–2	Grasshopper Club	St. Jakob-Park, Basel
16:15	M. Yakin (penalty missed) 24'; Tum 71' (1:2); Atouba (yellow card) 48'; M. Yakin (yellow card) 60'; Smiljanić (yellow card) 76'; Varela (yellow card) 85'	FCB summary	(yellow card) 25' Tararache; 42' (0:1) Rozental; 60' (0:2) Núñez; (yellow card) 87' Gerber	Attendance: 33,433 (sold out); Referee: (Switzerland) Urs Meier (Wettingen and Würenlos)
Note: FCB without Zuberbühler (ill with gastroenteritis), Hakan Yakin, Ergic, Koumantarakis and Savic (all injured). GC without Zanni, Hodel, Baturina and Jaggy (all injured) and Eduardo (suspended). 24th minute, the penalty kick from Murat Yakin was shot wide of the goal. 64th minute, GC goalkeeper Borer struck on the head by an object from the "Muttenzer Kurve", two-minute stoppage.

7 December 2002 Round 22	Wil	1–4	Basel	Bergholz, Wil
14:30	Romano 40' (pen. 1:3); Balmer (yellow card) 43'; Romano (yellow card) 89'	FCB summary	4' (0:1) Giménez; 30' (0:2) H. Yakin; 37' (0:3) Barberis; 67' (1:4) Esposito	Attendance: 5,400; Referee: (Switzerland) Markus Nobs (Wohlen bei Bern)
Note: Wil without Montandon (suspended), Fabinho, Bamba, Zellweger (all injured) and Beney (was ill); FCB without Varela (suspended), Murat Yakin, Koumantarakis, Savic, Haas and Ergic (all injured). NLA debuts for Wil players Hämmerli and Zverotic.

==== League table ====
Pos	Team	Pld	W	D	L	GF	GA	GD	BP	Pts	Qualification
1	Grasshopper Club	22	15	4	3	58	26	+32	0	49	Advance to championship round halved points (rounded up) as bonus
2	Basel	22	14	5	3	57	25	+32	0	47	Advance to championship round halved points (rounded up) as bonus
3	Thun	22	9	4	9	33	33	0	0	31	Advance to championship round halved points (rounded up) as bonus
4	Wil	22	8	7	7	43	45	−2	0	31	Advance to championship round halved points (rounded up) as bonus
5	Zürich	22	9	4	9	35	37	−2	0	31	Advance to championship round halved points (rounded up) as bonus
6	Xamax	22	8	7	7	30	33	−3	0	31	Advance to championship round halved points (rounded up) as bonus
7	Young Boys	22	8	6	8	41	41	0	0	30	Advance to championship round halved points (rounded up) as bonus
8	Servette	22	8	5	9	45	37	+8	0	29	Advance to championship round halved points (rounded up) as bonus
9	Luzern	22	7	5	10	31	38	−7	−2	24	Continue to promotion/relegation round
10	St. Gallen	22	6	6	10	31	48	−17	0	24	Continue to promotion/relegation round
11	SR Delémont	22	6	2	14	24	44	−20	0	20	Continue to promotion/relegation round
12	Aarau	22	5	3	14	19	40	−21	0	18	Continue to promotion/relegation round

Source: RSSSF
Rules for classification: 1) points; 2) goal difference; 3) number of goals scored.
FC Luzern 2 points deducted for irregularities in license application, therefore total points: 24

==== Championship round ====
The first eight teams of the qualification phase competed in the championship playoff round. They took half of the points (rounded up) gained in qualification as bonus with them. This phase began on 1 March 2003 and was completed on 31 May.

1 March 2003 Round 1	Xamax	3–1	Basel	Stade de la Maladière, Neuchâtel
17:30	M'Futi (yellow card) 57'; Buess 74' (1:1); Simo 79' (2:1); Wiederkehr (yellow card) 82'; Mangane 90+2' (3:1)	FCB summary	10' (0:1) Tum; (yellow card) 43'Chipperfield; (yellow card) 67' Atouba; (yellow card) 79' Huggel; (yellow card) 82' Zuberbühler; (yellow card) 90+1' Smiljanić	Attendance: 8,200; Referee: (Switzerland) Philippe Leuba (Chexbres)
Note: Xamax without Tsawa and Da Silva (both injured).FCB without Rossi (suspended), Quennoz and Varela (both sick), Ergic and Esposito (both injured). Minute of mourning for NLB referee Christophe Robert, who died in the referee training camp in Gran Canaria. For the first time on direct TV broadcast in Switzerland, a fourth referee on the edge of the pitch on the middle line.

8 March 2003 Round 2	Basel	2–0	Servette	St. Jakob-Park, Basel
19:30	Haas 26'; Haas (yellow card) 54'; M. Yakin 67' (pen.)	FCB summary	(yellow card) 18' Bullo	Attendance: 16,053; Referee: (Liechtenstein) Roland Beck (Triesenberg)
Note: FCB without Ergic and Esposito (both injured), Streller and Degen (both with the U-21 team). Servette without Hilton (suspended), Fournier, Senderos, Obradovic, Weber and Lanoizelet (all injured). The Muttenzer Kurve is empty due to a partial stadium closure, resulting in 7,490 fewer seats.

15 March 2003 Round 3	Thun	1–4	Basel	Stadion Lachen, Thun
17:30	Baumann (yellow card) 14'; Baumann 35' (pen. 1:2)	FCB summary	22' (0:1) H. Yakin; 26' (0:2) Tum; (yellow card) 35' Cantaluppi; 36' (1:3) Rossi; 57' (1:4) H. Yakin	Attendance: 7,200; Referee: (Switzerland) Massimo Busacca (Monte Carasso/Bellinzona)
Note: Thun without Aegerter and Balmer (both suspended) and Heinz Moser (injured). FCB without Zwyssig, Gimenez, Ergic, Milicevic and Esposito (all injured).

22 March 2003 Round 4	Basel	2–2	Grasshopper Club	St. Jakob-Park, Basel
17:30	Cantaluppi (yellow card) 28'; Haas (yellow card) 33'; Chipperfield (yellow card) 42'; Smiljanić (yellow card) 45'; Atouba (yellow card) 65'; Giménez 73' (1:1); Varela (yellow card) 77'; M. Yakin 82' (2:2)	FCB summary	(yellow card) 5' Eduardo; 12' (0:1) Cabanas; (yellow card) 13' Spycher; (yellow card) 45' Schwegler; (yellow card) 45' Gamboa; 74' (1:2) Petrić; (yellow card) 82' Tararache	Attendance: 30,502; Referee: (Austria) Konrad Plautz
Note: This match was played as part of the interaction referee exchange between the Swiss Football Association and the Austrian Football Association. FCB without Ergic and Esposito (both injured). GC without Hodel, Jaggy, Mitreski, Mikari, and Digenti (all injured).

6 April 2003 Round 5	Zürich	1–2	Basel	Letzigrund, Zürich
16:15	Guerrero 49' (1:1); Chihab (yellow card) 85'; Bastida (yellow card) 89'	FCB summary FCZ summary	8' (0:1) Rossi; 87' (1:2) Huggel; (yellow card) 90+2' Atouba	Attendance: 13,500; Referee: (Switzerland) Markus Nobs (Wohlen bei Bern)
Note: FCZ without Hellinga (suspended) as well as Pallas, Quentin and Yasar (all injured). FCB without Murat Yakin, Haas, Cantaluppi and Ergic (all injured). 50th minute: a header from Huggel hit the crossbar.

12 April 2003 Round 6	Basel	3–1	Wil	St. Jakob-Park, Basel
19:30	Duruz (yellow card) 4'; Huggel 13' (1:0); Rossi 20' (2:0); Huggel 59' (3:0)	FCB summary	(yellow card) 29' Pavlović; (yellow card) 43' Bamba; (yellow card) 47' Mangiarratti; 73' (3:1) Lustrinelli	Attendance: 26,789; Referee: (Switzerland) Guido Wildhaber (Kerzers)
Note: FCB without Atouba (suspended), as well as Gimenez, Murat Yakin and Ergic (all injured). Wil without Romano (suspended), along with Morales, Dilaver, Valmir and Rizzo (all injured). FCB with a tactical change in the 33rd minute following Duruz's injury, Quennoz moved to central defense, while Smiljanic switched to the left flank. After Esposito came on, Chipperfield played in attack alongside Tum.

19 April 2003 Round 7	Basel	3–0	Young Boys	St. Jakob-Park, Basel
15:45	H. Yakin 13' (1:0); H. Yakin 30' (pen. 2:0); H. Yakin 38' (3:0); Zwyssig (yellow card) 61'	FCB summary	(yellow card) 38' Disler	Attendance: 29,659 (sold out); Referee: (Switzerland) Urs Meier (Wettingen and Würenlos)
Note: FCB without Duruz, Ergic, Gimenez, Tum and Murat Yakin (all injured). YB without Descloux, Fryand and Tikva (all injured) and Eugster (suspended).

27 April 2003 Round 8	Young Boys	2–0	Basel	Stadion Neufeld, Bern
16:15	Petrosyan (yellow card) 37'; Magnin 61'; Vonlanthen 90'	FCB summary	(yellow card) 35' Cantaluppi; (yellow card) 62' (red card) 75' H. Yakin; (yellow card) 76' M. Yakin	Attendance: 11,850 (sold out); Referee: (Switzerland) Carlo Bertolini (Vira-Gambarogno)
Note: The Young Boys played their home games in the Stadion Neufeld after the Wankdorf Stadium was demolished in 2001 and the new Stadion Wankdorf was constructed on the same site. YB without Disler, Eugster, Paulinho (all suspended), Fryand and Tikva (both injured). FCB without Ergic and Tum (both injured). National team coach Köbi Kuhn in the stands. 19th minute, Smiljanic deflects a shot from Berisha onto the crossbar. 20th minute, Rotanzi clears the ball off the line that came from Huggel. 52nd minute, Descloux left the game injured. 93rd minute, a shot from Sermeter hit the post.

4 May 2003 Round 9	Wil	4–5	Basel	Bergholz, Wil
16:15	Zellweger (yellow card) 26'; Pavlović (yellow card) 29'; Pavlović 31' (1:3); Fabinho 42' (2:3); Lustrinelli 48' (3:3); Rizzo 74' (4:5)	FCB summary	3' (0:1) Huggel; 15' (0:2) Barberis; 25' (0:3) Huggel; 55' (3:4) Esposito; 65' (3:5) Giménez	Attendance: 4,700; Referee: (Switzerland) Florian Etter
Note: Wil without Mangiarratti and Zverotic (both suspended), Bamba and Morales (both injured). FCB without Hakan and Murat Yakin (both suspended), Ergic, Haas, Varela and Tum (all injured). 12th minute, a goal from Pavlovic was disallowed for a foul on Esposito. 41st minute, a shot from Smiljanic hit the post. 53rd minute, a shot from Lustrinelli hit the underside of the crossbar.

8 May 2003 Round 10	Basel	3–1	Zürich	St. Jakob-Park, Basel
20:15	Rossi 31' (1:0); Rossi (yellow card) 34'; Duruz (yellow card) 39'; Chipperfield 44' (2:0); Giménez 76' (3:0)	FCB summary FCZ summary	(yellow card) 40' Guerrero; 81' (3:1) Bastida	Attendance: 29,780; Referee: (Liechtenstein) Roland Beck (Triesenberg)
Note: FCB without Ergic, Atouba and Tum (all injured). FCZ without Pallas and Yasar (both injured) as well as Keller and Nef (both suspended). 9th minute, a goal by Hakan Yakin was disallowed due to Gimenez being offside. 46th minute, a goal by Rossi was disallowed for an alleged offside.

17 May 2003 Round 11	Grasshopper Club	2–2	Basel	Hardturm, Zürich
20:15	Petrić 18' (1:0); Petrić (yellow card) 44'; Cabanas (red card) 45'; Tararache (yellow card) 48'; Spycher 58' (2:0); Schwegler (yellow card) 82'	FCB summary	(yellow card) 20' Atouba; (red card) 45' Cantaluppi; (yellow card) 49' M. Yakin; 65' (2:1) H. Yakin; 66' (2:2) Giménez	Attendance: 17,666 (sold out); Referee: (Switzerland) Massimo Busacca (Monte Carasso/Bellinzona)
Note: FCB without Ergic (was ill) and Huggel (injured). Corners: 3–10 (0–5). FIFA President Sepp Blatter and Liverpool manager Gérard Houllier in the stands. 300 security personnel on duty. 45th minute, Cabanas and Cantaluppi both sent off because of acts of violence.

21 May 2003 Round 12	Basel	4–0	Thun	St. Jakob-Park, Basel
19:30	M. Yakin 3' (pen. 1:0); H. Yakin 58' (2:0); Chipperfield 62' (3:0); Rossi 66' (4:0)	FCB summary	(yellow card) 31' Hodžić; (yellow card) 88' H. Moser	Attendance: 28,132; Referee: (Switzerland) Dieter Schoch (Attiswil)
Note: FCB without Ergic (was ill), Huggel and Tum (both injured), Cantaluppi and Gimenez (both suspended). Thun without Adrian Moser (injured), Deumi (suspended), and Streller (not in the squad).

24 May 2003 Round 13	Servette	0–4	Basel	Stade de Genève, Geneva
17:30	Bah (yellow card) 82'	FCB summary	17' (0:1) M. Yakin; 21' (0:2) Rossi; 23' (0:3) Giménez; 56' (0:4) Giménez; (yellow card) 71' M. Yakin	Attendance: 14,543; Referee: (Switzerland) Urs Meier (Wettingen and Würenlos)
Note: Servette withoutLondono, Senderos, and Bullo (all suspended), as well as Roth, Fournier, Thurre, Jaquet, Lombardo, Pont and Miéville (all injured). FCB without Ergic and Esposito (both ill) and Barberis and Tum (both injured), but they fielded Cantaluppi and Gimenez—who were both technically suspended, but following appeals against their bans. Kick-off was taken by former Servette star José Sinval. Jérémy Pauchard (Servette) made his NLA debut. 35th minute Haas (FCB) left the match with a muscle strain.

31 May 2003 Round 14	Basel	3–0	Xamax	St. Jakob-Park, Basel
20:15	Huggel 18' (1:0); Rossi 36' (2:0); Huggel 38' (3:0)	FCB summary		Attendance: 30,939 (sold out); Referee: (Switzerland) Markus Nobs (Wohlen bei Bern)
Note: FCB without Gimenez and Cantaluppi (both suspended) as well as Tum, Barberis (both injured), and Ergic (ill). Neuchâtel Xamax without Portillo and Buess (both suspended) as well as Delay and Sanou (both injured). 25th minute: Rey hits the post.

==== Final league table ====
Pos	Team	Pld	W	D	L	GF	GA	GD	BP	Pts	Qualification
1	Grasshopper Club	14	9	5	0	37	15	+22	25	57	Swiss champions qualification to Champions League third qualifying round
2	Basel	14	10	2	2	38	17	+21	24	56	Swiss Cup winners qualification to UEFA Cup first round
3	Xamax	14	5	4	5	18	17	+1	16	35	qualification to UEFA Cup qualifying round
4	Young Boys	14	6	1	7	21	29	−8	15	34	qualification to UEFA Cup qualifying round
5	Zürich	14	4	3	7	20	23	−3	16	31	
6	Servette	14	4	4	6	16	26	−10	15	31	
7	Thun	14	3	3	8	18	30	−12	16	28	entered Intertoto Cup second round
8	Wil	14	2	4	8	19	30	−11	16	26	entered Intertoto Cup first round

Source: RSSSF
Rules for classification: 1) points; 2) Position in the qualification round

=== Swiss Cup ===
The twelve first-tier clubs from the 2002–03 Nationalliga A had been granted byes for the first four rounds and they joined the competition in the fifth round. The first-tier teams were seeded and cound not be drawn against each other. The draw respected regionalities, when possible, and the lower classed team was granted home advantage.

22 February 2003 Round 5	Yverdon-Sport	0–3	Basel	Stade Municipal, Yverdon-les-Bains
16:00	Gil Bala (yellow card) 20'; Gilardi (yellow card) 80'	FCB summary	16' (pen.) Cantaluppi; (yellow card) 18' Haas; 40' (0:2) Cantaluppi; (red card) 41' Rossi; 89' (0:3) Atouba	Attendance: 2,800; Referee: (Switzerland) Reto Rutz (Amriswil)
Note: Yverdon-Sport played the 2002/03 season in the NLB (second-tier). FCB without Barberis, Ergic, Esposito and Murat Yakin (all injured). 29th minute, a shot from Rossi hit the post. 40th minute, Rossi received the sending off for unsporting behavior. 70th minute, a shot from Varela hit the crossbar.

4 March 2003 Round 6	Basel	2–0	Servette	St. Jakob-Park, Basel
19:30	Barberis (yellow card) 28'; Cantaluppi 35' (pen.); Chipperfield 51' (2:0)	FCB summary	(yellow card) 39' Comisetti; (yellow card) 68' Lombardo; (yellow card) 75' Bratić; (yellow card) 85' Kader	Attendance: 10,721; Referee: (Switzerland) Guido Wildhaber (Kerzers)
Note: FCB without Rossi (suspended), Ergic and Esposito (both injured), and Quennoz (not in the squad). Servette without Fournier, Obradovic, Senderos and Lanoizelet (all injured).

26 March 2003 Quarter-final	Young Boys	3–4 (a.e.t.)	Basel	Stadion Neufeld, Bern
19:30	Petrosyan (yellow card) 16'; Häberli (yellow card) 27'; Sermeter 39' (1:2); Sermeter 42' (pen. 2:2); Sermeter 55' (3:2); Patrick (yellow card) 88'; Sermeter (yellow card) 120'	FCB summary	2' (0:1) Giménez; (yellow card) 19' Duruz; 28' (0:2) Giménez; (yellow card) 36' Tum; (yellow card) 41' (yellow-red card) 44' Varela; (yellow card) 57' H. Yakin; (yellow card) 59' Haas; 65' (3:3) Tum; (yellow card) 95' M. Yakin; 108' (3:4) H. Yakin	Attendance: 10,700 (sold out); Referee: (Switzerland) Carlo Bertolini (Vira-Gambarogno)
Note: YB without Tikva and Descloux (both injured). FCB without Esposito and Ergic (both injured) as well as Atouba (away with the Cameroon national team). 65th minute, YB goalkeeper Collaviti deflected a header from Murat Yakin onto the crossbar and Tum converted the rebound.

15 April 2003 Semi-final	Basel	3–0	Schaffhausen	St. Jakob-Park, Basel
20:15	Esposito 26' (1:0); Chipperfield (yellow card) 65'; Esposito (yellow card) 72'; Tum 90' (2:0); Esposito 90+2' (3:0)	FCB summary	(yellow card) 18' Leu; (yellow card) 23' Fehr	Attendance: 26,960; Referee: (Switzerland) Reto Rutz (Amriswil)
Note: FCB without Hakan Yakin, Haas and Varela (all suspended), and Murat Yakin, Gimenez, Duruz and Ergic (all injured). Schaffhausen without Todisco and Rohrer (both suspended). 5th minute: a shot from Cantaluppi hit the post. 7th minute, a goal by Rossi was disallowed for offside. 42nd minute, Rossi hit the crossbar with a header. 70th minute, a goal by Tchouga way disallowed (dangerous play).

11 May 2003 Final	Basel	6–0	Xamax	St. Jakob-Park, Basel
15:00	Huggel 13' (1:0); Giménez 35' (2:0); Giménez 43' (3:0); M. Yakin 65' (4:0); Smiljanić 77' (5:0); Barberis 83' (6:0)	Fussball-Schweiz summary FCB summary	(yellow card) 57' Leandro; (yellow card) 87' Buess	Attendance: 31,500 (sold out); Referee: (Switzerland) René Rogalla (Wallisellen)
Note: FCB without Ergic (was ill) and Tum (injured). Xamax without Von Bergen (suspended), Tsawa, Da Silva and backup goalkeeper Delay (all injured). 23rd minute: a goal by Rossi was disallowed due to a preceding foul. 68th minute, a goal by Rossi was disallowed for offside.

Basel won the cup and this was the club's seventh cup title to this date and their second consecutive cup title.

=== Champions League ===
The 2002–03 UEFA Champions League was the 11th season of UEFA's premier European club football tournament, the UEFA Champions League, since its rebranding in 1992, and the 48th European Cup tournament overall.

==== Second qualifying round ====
31 July 2002 First leg	Žilina (Slovakia)	1–1	(Switzerland) Basel	Štadión pod Dubňom, Žilina
18:00	Sninský (yellow card) 55'; Barčík 29' (1:0)	UEFA summary FCB summary	(yellow card) 23' Chipperfield; (yellow card) 32' Esposito; 38' (o.g.) Klago; (yellow card) 84' Varela	Attendance: 6,258; Referee: Laurent Duhamel (France)
Note: FCB without Murat Yakin, Koumantarakis (both with adductor muscle tightness), Huggel, Savic and Streller (all injured).

7 August 2002 Second leg	Basel (Switzerland)	3–0 (4–1 agg.)	(Slovakia) Žilina	St. Jakob-Park, Basel
19:30	Giménez 12' (1:0); M. Yakin 23' (2:0); Esposito (yellow card) 45'; Giménez 50' (3:0)	UEFA summary FCB summary	(yellow card) 73' Špendla; (yellow card) 80' Staš	Attendance: 16,562; Referee: Darko Čeferin (Slovenia)
Note: FCB without Chipperfield, Koumantarakis and Huggel (all injured) and Savic (youth squad). Zilina had their full squad. 44th minute: a shot from Rossi hit the post. 15,396 tickets sold in advance.

Basel won 4–1 on aggregate

==== Third qualifying round ====
14 August 2002 First leg	Celtic (Scotland)	3–1	(Switzerland) Basel	Celtic Park, Glasgow
20:45	Larsson 3' (pen.); Sutton 52' (2:1); Larsson (penalty missed) 63′ Lambert (yellow card) 64'; Sylla 88' (3:1)	UEFA report FCB summary	2' (0:1) Giménez; (yellow card) 52' Duruz; (yellow card) 62' H. Yakin; (yellow card) 64' Cantaluppi; (yellow card) 81' Varela	Attendance: 58,520; Referee: Manuel Mejuto González (Spain)
Note: Celtic without Agathe (injured). FCB without Chipperfield and Huggel (both injured). 63rd minute, Zuberbühler saved the penalty from Larsson, (which was awarded for handball) with his feet. Around 1,000 Basel fans, who arrived on four charter flights, were in the stadium.

28 August 2002 Second leg	Basel (Switzerland)	2–0 (3–3 agg.)	(Scotland) Celtic	St. Jakob-Park, Basel
20:30	Giménez 9'; Rossi (yellow card) 12'; M. Yakin 22'; Varela (yellow card) 42'	UEFA summary FCB summary	(yellow card) 42' Sylla; (yellow card) 42' Guppy	Attendance: 30,510 (sold out); Referee: Anders Frisk (Sweden)
Note: FCB without Chipperfield, Esposito, Huggel and Zwyssig (all injured). Barberis and Hakan Yakin wore head bandages following collisions. Barberis played in midfield after Degen was substituted on. After the break, tactical change by Celtic, who then played with a three-man defense and Sylla in central midfield.

3–3 on aggregate, Basel won on away goals

==== Group stage ====
17 September 2002 Matchday 1	Basel (Switzerland)	2–0	(Russia) Spartak Moscow	St. Jakob-Park, Basel
20:45	H. Yakin 50' (1:0); Rossi 55' (2:0)	UEFA summary FCB summary	(yellow card) 72' Kalynychenko	Attendance: 29,500 (sold out); Referee: Claus Bo Larsen (Denmark)
Note: FCB without Ergic, Chipperfield, Zwyssig and Huggel (all injured) and Varela (suspended). Spartak missing players including Titov and Parfenov (both injured) and Sychev (suspended by both the club and the Russian federation). Basel's Champions League debut. 15th minute: a headed goal by Rossi was disallowed for offside. 23rd minute: a header from Murat Yakin hit the post. 70th minute: a header from Rossi hit the crossbar. There was a brief stoppage in play after the half time break due to a smoke bomb set off in the Muttenzer Kurve.

25 September 2002 Matchday 2	Liverpool (England)	1–1	(Switzerland) Basel	Anfield, Liverpool
20:45	Baroš 34' (1:0); Diouf (yellow card) 88'	UEFA summary FCB summary	43' (1:1) Rossi; (yellow card) 65' Haas	Attendance: 37,643; Referee: Dick van Egmond (Netherlands)
Note: Liverpool without Hamann (suspended) and Smicer (injured). FCB without Huggel, Ergic and Chipperfield (all injured). 2nd minute: FCB goalkeeper Zuberbühler tipped a shot from Riise onto the crossbar. 10th minute, Zuberbühler deflected a shot from Riise onto the crossbar. 45th minute: a shot by Baros hit the inside of the post.

2 October 2002 Matchday 3	Valencia (Spain)	6–2	(Switzerland) Basel	Estadio Mestalla, Valencia
20:45	Carew 10' (1:0); Carew 13' (2:0); Aurélio 17' (3:0); Baraja 28' (4:0); Aimar 58' (5:1); Mista 60' (6:1); Ayala (yellow card) 89'	UEFA summary FCB summary	46' (4:1) Rossi; 90' (6:2) H. Yakin	Attendance: 27,394; Referee: Cosimo Bolognino (Italy)
Note: Valencia without Kily González (injured). FCB without Huggel and Chipperfield (both injured). 29th minute, a header from Carew hit the post. 49th minute, a shot from Angulo struck the underside of the crossbar. 52nd minute, Murat Yakin cleared off the line following a shot by Mista. Perminant rainfall before and throughout the entire match. Therefore, the pitch was very wet and scattered with puddles.

22 October 2002 Matchday 4	Basel (Switzerland)	2–2	(Spain) Valencia	St. Jakob-Park, Basel
20:45	Ergić 32' (1:0); Haas (yellow card) 64'; H. Yakin (yellow card) 87'; Ergić 90' (2:2)	UEFA summary FCB summary	36' (1:1) Baraja; (yellow card) 63' Baraja; (yellow card) 66' (yellow-red card) 88' Ayala; 72' (1:2) Torres	Attendance: 29,500 (sold out); Referee: Helmut Fleischer (Germany)
Note: FCB without Huggel (recovering fitness) and Chipperfield (injured). Valencia without Aimar (injured) and Albelda (niggling injury).

5 November 2002 Matchday 5	Spartak Moscow (Russia)	0–2	(Switzerland) Basel	Dynamo Stadium, Moscow
18:00	Kovtun (yellow card) 65'; Torbinski (yellow card) 73'	UEFA summary FCB summary	18' Rossi; (yellow card) 84' Giménez; 89' Giménez	Attendance: 5,000; Referee: Stuart Dougal (Scotland)
Note: Spartak without Titov (injured) and Sychev (suspended internally and by the Russian federation). FCB without Chipperfield (injured).

12 November 2002 Matchday 6	Basel (Switzerland)	3–3	(England) Liverpool	St. Jakob-Park, Basel
20:45	Rossi 2' (1:0); Giménez 22' (2:0); Atouba 29' (3:0); Esposito (yellow card) 84'	UEFA summary FCB summary	61' (3:1) Murphy; (yellow card) 61' Šmicer; 64' (3:2) Šmicer; (yellow card) 70' Murphy; (penalty missed) 85′ Owen; 85' (3:3) Owen	Attendance: 29,500 (sold out); Referee: Claude Colombo (France)
Note: FCB without Chipperfield (recovering). Liverpool without Henchoz (recovering) and Abel Xavier (injured). 11th minute: FCB goalkeeper Zuberbühler tipped a shot from Heskey onto the crossbar. 85th minute: Zuberbühler saved the penalty from Owen (awarded for handball) but was beaten by him on the rebound.

Final group table

Pos	Team	Pld	W	D	L	GF	GA	GD	Pts	Qualification	VAL	BAS	LIV	SPA
1	(Spain) Valencia	6	5	1	0	17	4	+13	16	Advance to second group stage	—	6–2	2–0	3–0
2	(Switzerland) Basel	6	2	3	1	12	12	0	9	Advance to second group stage	2–2	—	3–3	2–0
3	(England) Liverpool	6	2	2	2	12	8	+4	8	Transfer to UEFA Cup	0–1	1–1	—	5–0
4	(Russia) Spartak Moscow	6	0	0	6	1	18	−17	0		0–3	0–2	1–3	—

Source: RSSSF

==== Second group stage ====
26 November 2002 Matchday 1	Basel (Switzerland)	1–3	(England) Manchester United	St. Jakob-Park, Basel
20:45	Giménez 1' (1:0); Zwyssig (yellow card) 19'; Atouba (yellow card) 72'	UEFA summary FCB summary	(yellow card) 14' Scholes; (yellow card) 22' Fortune; 62' (1:1) van Nistelrooy; 63' (1:2) van Nistelrooy; (yellow card) 66' Verón; 68' (1:3) Solskjær	Attendance: 35,000 (sold out); Referee: Valentin Ivanov (Russia)
Note: FCB without Esposito (suspended), Koumantarakis and Savic (injured). Manchester United without Beckham, Blanc, Butt, Ferdinand, Keane and Gary Neville (all injured). 1st minute Fortune cleared off the line; the ensuing play leads to the goal by Gimenez.

11 December 2002 Matchday 2	Juventus (Italy)	4–0	(Switzerland) Basel	Stadio delle Alpi, Turin
20:45	Trezeguet 3' (1:0); Montero 34' (2:0); Tacchinardi 43' (3:0); Del Piero 51' (pen.); Iuliano (yellow card) 53'	UEFA summary FCB summary	(yellow card) 50' Esposito; (yellow card) 72' H. Yakin	Attendance: 22,639; Referee: Lucílio Batista (Portugal)
Note: Juventus without Tudor (injured), Di Vaio and Fresi (both left out of the squad). FCB without Ergić, Haas, Koumantarakis, and Savić (all injured). Tatical change, Basel played a 4-4-2 formation in the second half, with Hakan Yakin as a second striker. 56th minute, a goal by Rossi was disallowed (offside).

19 February 2003 Matchday 3	Basel (Switzerland)	1–0	(Spain) Deportivo La Coruña	St. Jakob-Park, Basel
20:45	Yakin 30' (1:0)	UEFA summary FCB summary	(yellow card) 57' Luque	Attendance: 29,031; Referee: René Temmink (Netherlands)
Note: FCB without Ergic and Esposito (both injured) and Smiljanic (ineligible). La Coruña without Molina, Cesar, Fran, Mauro Silva and Victor (all injured). 10th minute: a direct free kick by Murat Yakin hit the inside of the post and bounced back into the field of play.

25 February 2003 Matchday 4	Deportivo La Coruña (Spain)	1–0	(Switzerland) Basel	Estadio Riazor, A Coruña
20:45	Tristán 4' (1:0)	UEFA summary FCB summary	(yellow card) 47' Varela	Attendance: 27,000; Referee: Stéphane Bré (France)
Note: La Coruña without goalkeeper Molina, Cesar, Mauro Silva, Donato and Victor (all injured). FCB without Murat Yakin and Cantaluppi (both ill), Ergic and Esposito (both injured), and Smiljanic (ineligible). Zuberbühler's 50th European Cup match.

12 March 2003 Matchday 5	Manchester United (England)	1–1	(Switzerland) Basel	Old Trafford, Manchester
20:45	P. Neville (yellow card) 7'; G. Neville 53' (1:1)	UEFA summary FCB summary	Giménez 14' (0:1); (yellow card) 32' Cantaluppi	Attendance: 66,870 (sold out); Referee: Claus Bo Larsen (Denmark)
Note: Man. Utd. without Keane and Veron (both injured), Silvestre and Fortune (both carrying knocks), and Barthez and van Nistelrooy (both rested). FCB without Esposito and Ergic (both injured) and Smiljanic (ineligible). Over 3,000 Basel fans flew to Manchester on 23 planes.

18 March 2003 Matchday 6	Basel (Switzerland)	2–1	(Italy) Juventus	St. Jakob-Park, Basel
20:45	Cantaluppi 38' (1:1); Giménez 90+2' (2:1)	UEFA summary FCB summary	Tacchinardi 10' (0:1)	Attendance: 30,501 (sold out); Referee: Wolfgang Stark (Germany)
Note: FCB without Ergic and Esposito (both injured). Juventus without Davids (suspended) and Di Vaio and Conte (both injured). 67th minute, a shot from Gimenez hit the crossbar.

Final group table

Pos	Team	Pld	W	D	L	GF	GA	GD	Pts	Qualification	MU	JUV	BAS	DEP
1	(England) Manchester United	6	4	1	1	11	5	+6	13	Advance to knockout stage	—	2–1	1–1	2–0
2	(Italy) Juventus	6	2	1	3	11	11	0	7	Advance to knockout stage	0–3	—	4–0	3–2
3	(Switzerland) Basel	6	2	1	3	5	10	−5	7		1–3	2–1	—	1–0
4	(Spain) Deportivo La Coruña	6	2	1	3	7	8	−1	7		2–0	2–2	1–0	—

Source: RSSSF

The competition was won by Milan, who beat Juventus on penalties in the European Cup's first ever all-Italian final, to win their sixth European title.

== Sources ==
- Rotblau: Jahrbuch Saison 2015/2016. Publisher: FC Basel Marketing AG. ISBN 978-3-7245-2050-4
- Rotblau: Jahrbuch Saison 2017/2018. Publisher: FC Basel Marketing AG. ISBN 978-3-7245-2189-1
- Die ersten 125 Jahre / 2018. Publisher: Josef Zindel im Friedrich Reinhardt Verlag, Basel. ISBN 978-3-7245-2305-5
- 2002–03 at "Basler Fussballarchiv” homepage
