= André Luís =

André Luís or André Luiz is a given name, may refer to:

== Sports ==
=== Football ===
- André Luís Ferreira (born 1959), Brazilian footballer
- André Luís Garcia (born 1979), Brazilian footballer
- André Luiz Ladaga (born 1975), naturalized Azerbaijani footballer
- André Luiz Moreira (born 1974), Brazilian footballer
- André Luiz Silva do Nascimento (born 1980), Brazilian football defender
- André Luiz de Oliveira Regatieri (born 1983), Brazilian footballer
- André Luís dos Santos Reis (born 1977), Brazilian footballer
- André Luís Leite (born 1986), Brazilian footballer
- André Luis (footballer, born 1994), born André Luis Silva de Aguiar, Brazilian forward
- André Luis (footballer, born 1997), born André Luis da Costa Alfredo, Brazilian forward
- André Luiz (footballer, born 2002), born André Luiz Inácio da Silva, Brazilian football winger
