= Eric Rapo =

Swiss footballer (born 1972)

Éric Rapo
Personal information
- Full name: Éric Rapo
- Date of birth: 6 March 1972 (age 54)
- Place of birth: Geneva, Switzerland
- Height: 1.88 m (6 ft 2 in)
- Position: Goalkeeper

Senior career*
| Years | Team | Apps | (Gls) |
| 1993–1996 | Chênois | 16 | (0) |
| 1994–1995 | → Grand-Lancy (loan) | 1 | (0) |
| 1996–1998 | Étoile Carouge | 56 | (0) |
| 1998–2002 | Lausanne-Sport | 66 | (0) |
| 2001 | → Yverdon-Sport (loan) | 20 | (0) |
| 2002 | → Wil (loan) | 10 | (0) |
| 2002–2005 | Basel | 2 | (0) |
| 2006 | Stade Nyonnais | | |
| 2006–2008 | Etoile Carouge | | |
| 2007 | → Urania Genève Sport (loan) | | |
| 2010–2011 | FC Baulmes | | |
| 2014 | Gland | | |
| 2015 | Amical Saint-Prex | | |
- * Club domestic league appearances and goals as of 28 July 2006 ‡ National team caps and goals as of 28 July 2006

Éric Rapo (born 6 March 1972) is a Swiss former footballer who played as a goalkeeper.

== Career ==
Rapo was reserve goalkeeper for Chênois in the 1993–94 season. Due to an injury of the first choice keeper, Rapo came to one appearance in the Nationalliga B the second tier of Swiss football. The following season he was loaned to neighbouring club Grand-Lancy. As he returned after the loan period Chênois had suffered relegation, but he stayed at the club. At this time he was working as warehouse labourer and playing football as amateur. For the 1996–97 season Étoile Carouge were looking for a new keeper and so Rapo moved on, playing as first choice goalkeeper in the second tier. At the end of the season Étoile Carouge had won the qualifying round and finished the promotion group in second position and thus winning promotion. However a year later they could not save themselves from relegation.

Lausanne-Sport had been monitoring the goalie and Rapo signed his first professional contract with them ahead of the 1998–99 Nationalliga A season as reserve goalkeeper. The following season he took over as first choice keeper and stayed this for two seasons. However in the 2001–02 season, suffering financial problems Lausanne loaned hime out. His first loan was for six months to Yverdon-Sport and for the second half of the season to Wil. As he returned from his loan period, Lausanne did not obtain a first level license for the 2002–03 season and so were relegated to the second tier. Rapo moved on.

On 21 May 2002 it was announced that Rapo had signed for Swiss Champions FC Basel in replacement of reserve goalkeeper Miroslav König, who had transferred to FC Zürich. He joined Basel's first team in advance of their 2002–03 season under head coach Christian Gross. On 1 December 2002, as first choice goalkeeper Pascal Zuberbühler was ill, Rapo played his domestic league debut for his new club in the home game in the St. Jakob-Park, as Basel were defeated 2–1 by Grasshopper Club. Basel ended their league season as runners-up.

In their 2003–04 league season the team started well, winning their first 13 matches straight out. The first defeat came on matchday 24. Basel won the championship with 26 victories and seven draws, the team had suffered just three away defeats, and obtained 85 points. Rapo had one league appearance, in the away game in the Hardturm on 16 May 2004 as Basel won 2–0 against Grasshopper Club. After suffering an injury Rapo was out of the game for four months and during the winter break of the 2004–05 league season he left the club on a free transfer. During his time with them, Rapo played a total of 35 games for Basel. Two of these games were in the Swiss Super League and 33 were friendly games.

Rapo move on to play six months for Stade Nyonnais. He joined Etoile Carouge in July 2005, but went on loan to Urania Genève Sport. After his loan period he returned to Etoile Carouge and played with them for two seasons and then he retired from his professional career.

== Honours ==
Basel

- Swiss Super League: 2003–04

== Sources ==
- Die ersten 125 Jahre. Publisher: Josef Zindel im Friedrich Reinhardt Verlag, Basel. ISBN 978-3-7245-2305-5
- Verein "Basler Fussballarchiv" Homepage
