= Alessandro Iandoli =

Italian footballer (born 1984)

Personal information
- Date of birth: 29 April 1984 (age 42)
- Place of birth: Basel, Switzerland
- Height: 1.81 m (5 ft 11 in)
- Position: Left back

Youth career
- Nordstern Basel
- until 2003: FC Basel

Senior career*
Years	Team	Apps	(Gls)
2003–2008	Concordia Basel	139	(31)
2008–2009	Pescara	12	(0)
2008	→ Avellino (loan)	0	(0)
2009–2011	Eupen	67	(0)
2011–2015	Sint-Truiden	87	(4)
2012–2013	→ Újpest FC (loan)	26	(0)
2013	→ Standard Liège (loan)	4	(0)
2015–2016	Sint-Truiden	0	(0)
- * Club domestic league appearances and goals

Alessandro Iandoli (born 29 April 1984) is a Swiss former footballer who played as a left back. He also holds Italian nationality.

== Career ==
Born in Basel, Iandoli first played his youth football with Nordstern Basel, but after a few years he moved on to FC Basel. He advanced to Basel's first team during their 2002–03 season. Iandoli played in a four of the teams test matches that season and travelled with the team to the summer training camp in the United States. Here he played in all three test games, including the match in Washington, D.C., on 15 June 2002. He scored his first goal for the club in the same game as Basel won 8–2 against Chesapeake Dragons. However he played with Basel's U-21 team that season in the third tier of Swiss football. With their U-21 team he played in 25 games scoring 11 goals.

Iandoli started his professional career at Switzerland for Concordia Basel. He played 139 matches at Swiss Challenge League. In August 2008, he returned to Italy for Pescara. On 6 August, he was loaned to Avellino of Serie B, along with Francesco Dettori. Later he returned to Pescara at Lega Pro Prima Divisione and player 12 matches.

His contract was canceled in mutual consent in July 2009, along with Claudio De Sousa.
