= Bernt Haas =

Swiss footballer (born 1978)

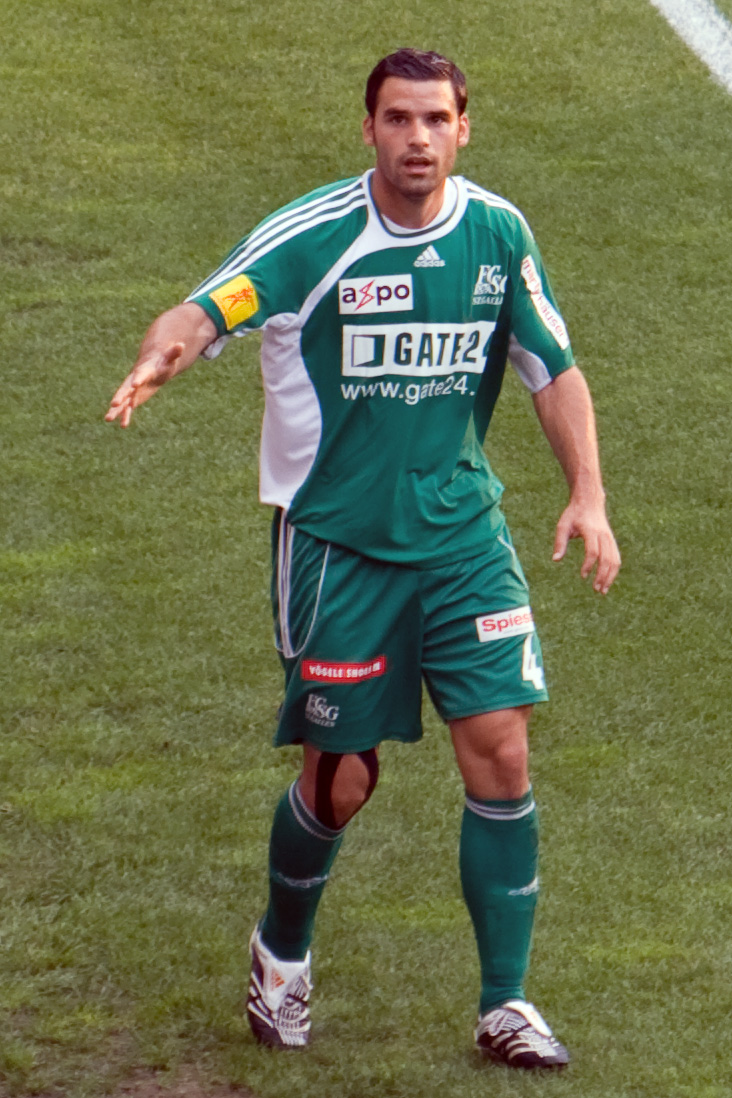
- Haas with St. Gallen in 2007

Personal information
- Date of birth: 8 April 1978 (age 48)
- Place of birth: Vienna, Austria
- Height: 1.85 m (6 ft 1 in)
- Position: Right-back

Youth career
- FC Freienbach
- Grasshopper Club

Senior career*
| Years | Team | Apps | (Gls) |
| 1994–2001 | Grasshopper Club | 165 | (6) |
| 2001–2002 | Sunderland | 27 | (0) |
| 2002–2003 | → FC Basel (loan) | 22 | (1) |
| 2003–2005 | West Bromwich Albion | 46 | (1) |
| 2005 | → Bastia (loan) | 4 | (0) |
| 2005–2006 | Bastia | 12 | (1) |
| 2006–2007 | 1. FC Köln | 19 | (0) |
| 2007–2009 | St. Gallen | 1 | (0) |
| 2009–2010 | St. Gallen U-21 | 2 | (0) |
| Total | | 298 | (9) |

International career
| 1996–2005 | Switzerland | 36 | (3) |

Managerial career
- 2015–2018: Vaduz (Director of football)
- 2020–2022: Schaffhausen (Sporting Director)
- 2022–2024: Grasshopper Club (Sporting Director)
- 2025–: Schaffhausen (Sporting Director)
- * Club domestic league appearances and goals

Bernt Haas (Swiss Standard German pronunciation: [bɛrnt haːs]; born 8 April 1978) is a Swiss former professional footballer who played as a right-back. He is the sporting director of FC Schaffhausen.

== Club career ==
Haas was born in Vienna, Austria. He played his early youth football with local club FC Freienbach before he moved to the youth department of Grasshoppers Zurich. Aged just 16 years he signed his first professional contract and advanced from the U-21 team to GC first team under head coach Christian Gross during the 1994–95 Nationalliga A season. Haas played his debut on 31 May 1995 as GC won an away game 3–1 against Lausanne-Sport. At the end of the season he won the Swiss Championship. Haas play his Champions League debut on 1 November 1995 as GC played a goalless draw against Ajax. Haas played with GC for seven seasons before moving to England to join Premier League club Sunderland in August 2001. Despite making 27 appearances for the club in 2001–02, he did not play for Sunderland during the following season and was loaned out to FC Basel.

On 30 August 2002, it was announced that Haas had joined Basel's first team during their 2002–03 season under head coach Christian Gross, who in the meantime had moved on. Haas played his domestic league debut for the club in the home game in the St. Jakob-Park on 11 September 2002 as Basel won 7–1 against Wil. Basel advanced to the group stage and they ended this in second position behind Valencia, but ahead of Liverpool and Spartak Moscow to advance to the second group stage. They ended this in third position behind Manchester United and Juventus, but ahead of Deportivo La Coruña. Haas scored his first goal for the club on 8 March 2003 in the home game as Basel won 2–0 against Servette.

Although Basel had a buy out option in the loan contract, Hass decided he wanted to return to England. During his 10 months with the club he played a total of 43 games for Basel scoring that one goal. 22 of these games were in the Swiss Super League, four in the Swiss Cup, 11 in the Champions League and six were friendly games.

Haas joined West Bromwich Albion in 2003, and was a regular at right-back as Albion were promoted back to the Premier League. He scored with a superb volley in the 2–0 League Cup win against Manchester United, having already scored in an earlier round against Brentford. He also scored once in the league against Crewe. However, he found his chances limited in the top-flight, and left the club by mutual consent on 21 January 2005. The following day he signed for SC Bastia in France, whom he played for prior to joining 1. FC Köln.

After just one season at Cologne, he joined Swiss Super League club FC St. Gallen in 2007. But injuries obstructed his progress. The career of the strong right-back ended in some doctor's room in St. Gallen. Cartilage damage and osteoarthritis in the knee.

== International career ==
Haas played for the Switzerland national team at Euro 2004 and was sent off in the match against England.

== Post-retirement ==
Following his retirement in 2010, Haas decided to go self-employed and became a player consultant. He functioned as director of football for Liechtensteiner club FC Vaduz from 2015 until 2018. He remained living in Wollerau and commuted the 40 minutes by car to the Principality.

Between 2020 and 2022, he functioned as Sporting Director at Swiss Challenge League side FC Schaffhausen. On 7 September 2023, he was fined 2,000 SFr for his role in Schaffhausen fielding ineligible players during the 2021–22 season. That season's top scorer Joaquín Ardaiz and his fellow Uruguayan Agustín González had made appearances in 21 games without a valid work permit.

On 1 July 2022, he was appointed sporting director of his former club Grasshopper Club Zürich. He was dismissed from this position on 27 March 2024.

On 3 March 2025, he returned to the sporting director position at Schaffhausen.

== Personal life ==
He has a twin sister named Dina, once a talented sports photographer and well known in the football business.

Haas once worked as a model for Armani.

== Career statistics ==
=== Club ===
Appearances and goals by club, season and competition
| Club | Season | League | | | National cup | | League cup | | Continental | | Total | |
| Club | Season | Division | Apps | Goals | Apps | Goals | Apps | Goals | Apps | Goals | Apps | Goals |
|---|---|---|---|---|---|---|---|---|---|---|---|---|
| Grasshoppers | 1994–95 | Swiss Super League | 2 | 0 | | | | | | | | |
| Grasshoppers | 1995–96 | Swiss Super League | 20 | 0 | | | | | | | | |
| Grasshoppers | 1996–97 | Swiss Super League | 29 | 1 | | | | | | | | |
| Grasshoppers | 1997–98 | Swiss Super League | 27 | 2 | | | | | | | | |
| Grasshoppers | 1998–99 | Swiss Super League | 28 | 1 | | | | | | | | |
| Grasshoppers | 1999–2000 | Swiss Super League | 16 | 1 | | | | | | | | |
| Grasshoppers | 2000–01 | Swiss Super League | 25 | 1 | | | | | | | | |
| Grasshoppers | Total | | 147 | 6 | | | | | | | | |
| Sunderland | 2001–02 | Premier League | 27 | 0 | 1 | 0 | 1 | 0 | – | | 29 | 0 |
| Sunderland | 2002–03 | Premier League | 0 | 0 | | | | | | | | |
| Sunderland | Total | | 27 | 0 | | | | | | | | |
| Basel | 2002–03 | Swiss Super League | 22 | 1 | | | | | | | | |
| West Bromwich Albion | 2003–04 | First Division | 36 | 1 | 1 | 0 | 5 | 2 | – | | 42 | 3 |
| West Bromwich Albion | 2004–05 | Premier League | 10 | 0 | 0 | 0 | 0 | 0 | – | | 10 | 0 |
| West Bromwich Albion | Total | | 46 | 1 | 1 | 0 | 5 | 2 | 0 | 0 | 52 | 3 |
| Bastia | 2004–05 | Ligue 1 | 4 | 0 | | | | | | | | |
| Bastia | 2005–06 | Ligue 2 | 12 | 1 | | | | | | | | |
| Bastia | Total | | 15 | 1 | | | | | | | | |
| 1. FC Köln | 2006–07 | 2. Bundesliga | 19 | 0 | 3 | 0 | – | | – | | 22 | 0 |
| St. Gallen | 2007–08 | Super League | 1 | 0 | | | | | | | | |
| St. Gallen | 2008–09 | Swiss Challenge League | 0 | 0 | | | | | | | | |
| St. Gallen | Total | | 1 | 0 | | | | | | | | |
| Career total | | | 277 | 9 | | | | | | | | |

=== International ===
Appearances and goals by national team and year
| National team | Year | Apps | Goals |
|---|---|---|---|
| Switzerland | 1996 | 1 | 0 |
| Switzerland | 1998 | 3 | 0 |
| Switzerland | 1999 | 3 | 1 |
| Switzerland | 2000 | 2 | 0 |
| Switzerland | 2001 | 2 | 0 |
| Switzerland | 2002 | 7 | 0 |
| Switzerland | 2003 | 6 | 2 |
| Switzerland | 2004 | 11 | 0 |
| Switzerland | 2005 | 1 | 0 |
| Total | | 36 | 3 |

Scores and results list Switzerland's goal tally first, score column indicates score after each Haas goal.

List of international goals scored by Bernt Haas
| No. | Date | Venue | Opponent | Score | Result | Competition | Ref. |
|---|---|---|---|---|---|---|---|
| 1 | 28 April 1999 | Spyros Louis Stadium, Athens, Greece | Greece | 1–0 | 1–1 | Friendly | |
| 2 | 12 February 2003 | Nova Gorica Sports Park, Nova Gorica, Slovenia | Slovenia | 2–0 | 5–1 | Friendly | |
| 3 | 11 June 2003 | Stade de Genève, Lancy, Switzerland | Albania | 1–0 | 3–2 | UEFA Euro 2004 qualifying | |

== Honours ==
Grasshoppers

- Swiss Championship: 1994–95, 1995–96, 1997–98, 2000–01

FC Basel

- Swiss Cup: 2003

== Sources ==
- Die ersten 125 Jahre. Publisher: Josef Zindel im Friedrich Reinhardt Verlag, Basel. ISBN 978-3-7245-2305-5
- Verein "Basler Fussballarchiv" Homepage
