= Francesco Dettori =

Italian footballer

Personal information
- Date of birth: 2 March 1983 (age 43)
- Place of birth: Sassari, Italy
- Height: 1.74 m (5 ft 9 in)
- Position: Midfielder

Senior career*
Years	Team	Apps	(Gls)
2000–2001	Pol. Latte Dolce		
2001–2002	Sangiovannese	10	(0)
2002–2004	Orvietana	66	(5)
2004–2008	Potenza	100	(8)
2008–2010	Pescara	21	(4)
2008–2009	→ Avellino (loan)	38	(0)
2010–2013	Chievo	0	(0)
2011	→ Triestina (loan)	15	(0)
2011–2012	→ Cremonese (loan)	31	(4)
2013	Perugia	9	(3)
2013–2014	Carrarese	28	(2)
2014	Pescara	0	(0)
2014–2015	Arezzo	32	(4)
2015–2016	Carrarese	32	(8)
2016–2017	Padova	37	(4)
2017–2018	FeralpiSalò	35	(1)
2018–2020	Potenza	62	(0)
2020–2023	Picerno	77	(4)
Total		593	(47)

Managerial career
- 2023–2024: Picerno (youth)
- 2024–2025: SS Santarcangiolese
- 2025–2026: ASD San Cataldo 1983
- * Club domestic league appearances and goals

Francesco Dettori (born 2 March 1983) is an Italian former footballer who played as a midfielder.

== Career ==
=== Early career ===
Born in Sassari, Sardinia, Dettori was a player for Latte Dolce in 2000–01 Promozione season. He then left for several Serie C and Serie D clubs, such as Pescara in January 2008.

=== Pescara ===
On 7 August 2008 Dettori and Iandoli were signed by Serie B side Avellino in temporary deals from Pescara. Avellino did not excised the option to sign Dettori in a co-ownership deal.

=== Chievo ===
Dettori joined Serie A club Chievo on 28 August 2010 in a co-ownership deal for €50,000. On the same day Roberto Inglese also joined Chievo for €600,000 and Luca Ariatti moved to Pescara for €650,000. He never played for Chievo in Serie A. He left for Triestina in January and Cremonese in temporary deals in August 2011. Chievo also signed Dettori outright in June 2011. Dettori was an unused member of Chievo in the first half of 2012–13 Serie A season.

=== Lega Pro clubs ===
In January 2013 Dettori joined Perugia for free. On 22 August he was signed by Carrarese in a 1-year contract. His contract was extended during the season. However, on 20 July 2014 Dettori was released by Carrarese again.

=== Pescara return ===
On 22 July 2014 Dettori was re-signed by Pescara. Dettori made his debut in Pescara's first match in 2014–15 Coppa Italia. He wrote no.21 shirt that season. Dettori received the call-up to the first match of 2014–15 Serie B. However, he did not play.

=== Return to Lega Pro ===
Just before the closure of the transfer window, Dettori was signed by Lega Pro newcomer Arezzo. On 28 July 2015 Dettori returned to Carrarese in a 1-year contract.

On 12 August 2020 Dettori joined Serie D club Picerno. He helped Picerno achieve promotion to Serie C at the end of the 2020–21 season.
