= Julio Hernán Rossi =

Argentine footballer

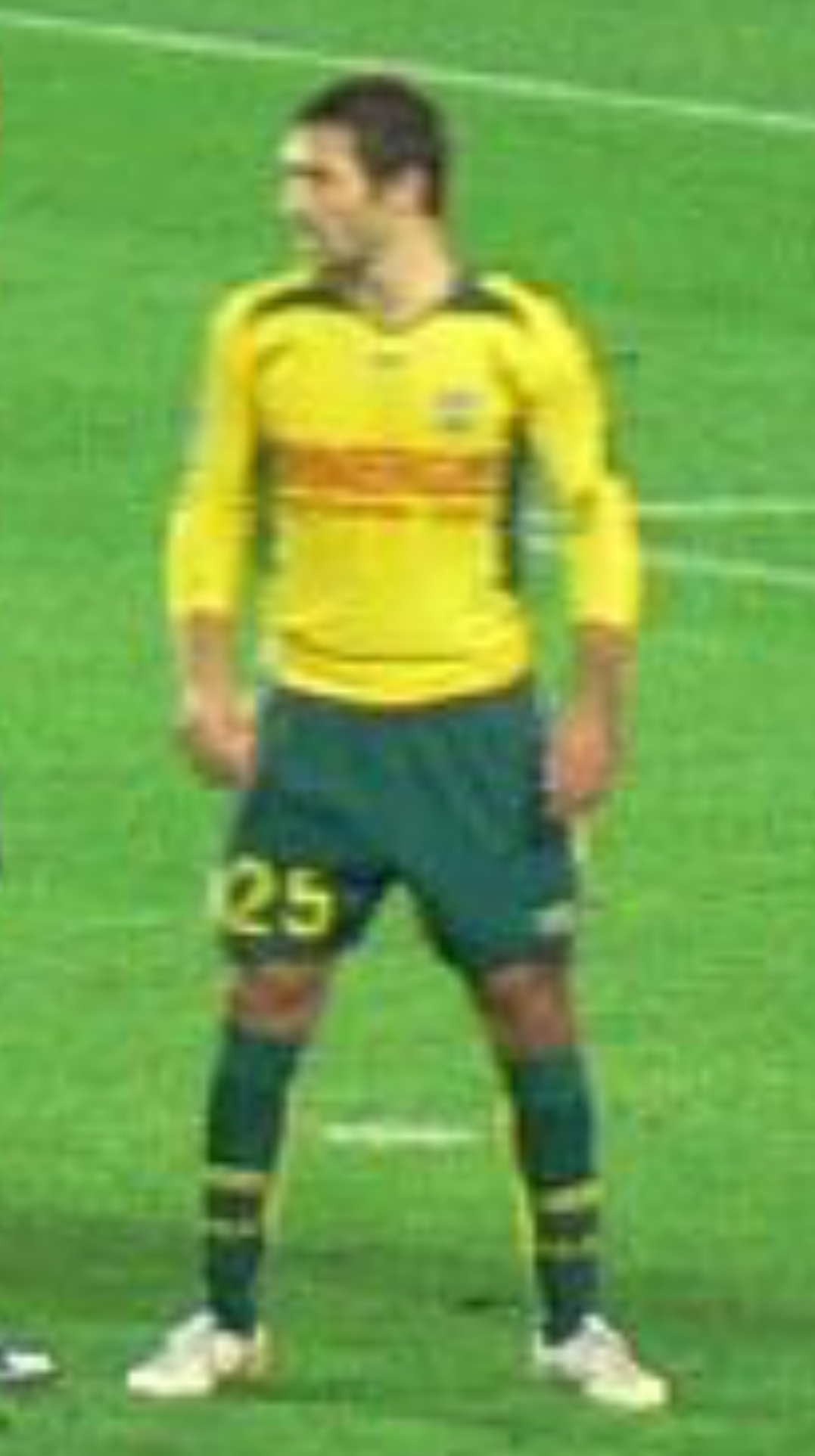

Personal information
- Full name: Julio Hernán Rossi
- Date of birth: 22 February 1977 (age 49)
- Place of birth: Buenos Aires, Argentina
- Height: 1.75 m (5 ft 9 in)
- Position: Striker

Senior career*
Years	Team	Apps	(Gls)
1995–1998	River Plate	11	(1)
1997	→ Avispa Fukuoka (loan)	11	(0)
1998–2002	Lugano	108	(59)
2002–2005	Basel	112	(36)
2006–2007	Nantes	36	(4)
2007–2010	Neuchâtel Xamax	51	(12)
2010	→ Neuchâtel Xamax U-21		
Total		329	(112)
- * Club domestic league appearances and goals

Julio Hernan Rossi (born 22 February 1977) is an Argentinian former football striker.

== Football career ==
=== Early years ===
Julio Hernán Rossi began his professional career at Argentinian club Club Atlético River Plate in July 1995, as he advanced from their youth team to their first team. During his time with River Plate he had a six-month unsuccessful loan spell at J1 League side Avispa Fukuoka.

=== Lugano ===
At the end of his contract Rossi moved to the Swiss Super League with FC Lugano in 1998 on a free contract. He quickly became a fans' favourite because of his skill, pace and goalscoring ability. He formed an effective striking partnership with fellow Argentine Christian Giménez and the team were placed relatively high in the league. Due to financial problems Lugano were forced to sell first Giménez and one year later Rossi. Nevertheless, the club was later denied the licence for the top flight due to the financial problems. Without the two million that FC Basel transferred to Lugano for Rossi at that time, the club could have been hit even worse.

=== Basel ===
On 3 April 2002 it was announced that Rossi had signed for Swiss Champions FC Basel. He joined Basel's first team during their 2002–03 season under head coach Christian Gross. After playing in six test games, Rossi played his domestic league debut for his new club in the away game in the Stadion Neufeld on 17 July 2002 as Basel played a 1–1 draw with Young Boys. He scored his first goal for his new team in the away game in the Espenmoos on 27 July, it was the equaliser as Basel played a 1–1 draw with St. Gallen. Basel's 2002–03 UEFA Champions League season started in the second qualifying round. After beating Žilina 4–1 on aggregate and Celtic on the away goals rule after a 3–3 aggregate, Basel advanced to the group stage. They ended this in second position behind Valencia, but ahead of Liverpool and Spartak Moscow to advance to the second group stage. They ended this in third position behind Manchester United and Juventus, but ahead of Deportivo La Coruña. Rossi played in all 16 of these European games, scoring five goals. Basel ended their league season as runners-up, but in the cup they advanced to the final and here they beat Xamax 6–0 to defend the title.

As cup winners Basel were qualified for the UEFA Cup first round and here they beat Malatyaspor 3–2 on aggregate due to the silver goal rule. However, in the second round they lost both games against Newcastle United. Rossi played in all four games. In their 2003–04 league season the team started well, winning their first 13 matches straight out. The first defeat came on matchday 24. Basel won the championship with 26 victories and seven draws, the team had suffered just three away defeats, and obtained 85 points. However, in the cup they were eliminated early, in round three.

As reigning Swiss champions, Basel entered 2004–05 UEFA Champions League in the third qualifying round, however, drawn against Internazionale, who won the qualifier 5–2 on aggregate. Basel subsequently dropped into the 2004–05 UEFA Cup. Beating Terek Grozny in the first round, Basel qualified for the group stage. A 1–1 draw away against Schalke 04 was followed by a home defeat against Hearts. But with two victories, 2–1 away against Ferencvárosi TC and 1–0 at home against Feyenoord, saw Basel rise to third place in the group table and advance to the knock-out stage. In the round of 32 in the 2004–05 UEFA Cup, a home game in the St. Jakob-Park on 17 February 2005, Basel played a goalless draw against Lille OSC, but the return leg were defeated 2–0 and were eliminated. Rossi played in all ten of these games, scoring one goal. Basel completed all the 2004–05 Super League season's seventeen home games undefeated, winning thirteen and drawing four. They ended the season as Swiss champions with 10 points advantage over second placed Thun.

As Swiss champions, Basel entered the 2005–06 Champions League third qualifying round. However, they were drawn against German Bundesliga club Werder Bremen and they lost 4–2 on aggregate. Subsequently, Basel dropped into the 2005–06 UEFA Cup, where against NK Široki Brijeg in the first round, they sealed a 6–0 aggregate win to qualify for the Group stage. Here Basel were then drawn into Group E, alongside Strasbourg, Roma, Red Star Belgrade and Tromsø. Rossi played in seven of the eight games, scoring two goals. Basel started into the 2005–06 Super League season well and despite the fact that Rossi played in all 18 games in the first half of the season, he left the club during the winter break. During his time with the club, Rossi played a total of 226 games for Basel scoring a total of 89 goals. 112 of these games were in the Swiss Super League, 12 in the Swiss Cup, 37 in the UEFA competitions (Champions League and UEFA Cup) and 65 were friendly games. He scored 36 goals in the domestic league, eight in the cup, eight in the European games and the other 37 were scored during the test games.

=== Later years ===
In 2006, Rossi moved to France's Ligue 1 to play for FC Nantes, but when the club were relegated in 2007, he was released on a free transfer. Ahead of the 2007–08 Swiss Super League he returned to Switzerland and joined Neuchâtel Xamax. In his first season, he was a regular starter for the team. But in his second he had less playing time. In April 2010 he was downgraded to the U-21 squad. From July 2010 to July 2011, Rossi was without a club. In the 2011–12 season he played in the highest Swiss amateur league with FC Serrières.

== Club statistics ==
Club performance			League	
Season	Club	League	Apps	Goals
Argentina			League	
1995/96	River Plate	Primera División	8	1
1996/97	River Plate	Primera División	0	0
Japan			League	
1997	Avispa Fukuoka	J1 League	11	0
Argentina			League	
1997/98	River Plate	Primera División	3	0
Switzerland			League	
1998/99	Lugano	Nationalliga A	22	15
1999/00	Lugano	Nationalliga A	29	12
2000/01	Lugano	Nationalliga A	24	11
2001/02	Lugano	Nationalliga A	33	21
2002/03	Basel	Nationalliga A	32	19
2003/04	Basel	Super League	31	8
2004/05	Basel	Super League	31	6
2005/06	Basel	Super League	18	3
France			League	
2005/06	Nantes Atlantique	Ligue 1	12	1
2006/07	Nantes Atlantique	Ligue 1	24	3
Switzerland			League	
2007/08	Neuchâtel Xamax	Super League		
2008/09	Neuchâtel Xamax	Super League		
2009/10	Neuchâtel Xamax	Super League		
Country	Argentina		11	1
Country	Japan		11	0
Country	Switzerland		220	95
Country	France		36	4
Total			278	100

== Honours ==
Basel

- Swiss Super League: 2003–04, 2004–05
- Swiss Cup: 2002–03

== Sources ==
- Die ersten 125 Jahre. Publisher: Josef Zindel im Friedrich Reinhardt Verlag, Basel. ISBN 978-3-7245-2305-5
- Verein "Basler Fussballarchiv" Homepage
