= Antonio Esposito (footballer, born 1972) =

Swiss-Italian former football midfielder

Personal information
- Date of birth: 13 December 1972 (age 53)
- Place of birth: Lugano, Switzerland
- Height: 1.85 m (6 ft 1 in)
- Position: Midfielder

Youth career
- –1992: Lugano

Senior career*
Years	Team	Apps	(Gls)
1992–1996	Lugano	121	(7)
1996–2001	Grasshopper Club	100	(15)
1999	→ Extremadura (loan)	16	(2)
2001	Cagliari	11	(1)
2001–2002	Saint-Étienne	24	(0)
2002–2004	FC Basel	29	(4)
2004	Varese	5	(0)
2004	FC Mendrisio	10	(1)
2005	Lugano	15	(2)
2005–2006	AC Malcantone		

International career
1993–1995	Switzerland U21	2	(0)
1997–2001	Switzerland	3	(0)
- * Club domestic league appearances and goals

Antonio Esposito (born 13 December 1972) is a Swiss-Italian former professional football midfielder who played throughout the 1990s and 2000s.

== Club career ==
=== Lugano ===
Born in Lugano, Switzerland, Esposito played his youth football in the youth department of Lugano. He made his debut in December 1991, coming in as a substitute as Lugano won 3–2 against Lausanne-Sport. He signed his first professional contract in the summer of 1992 and joined Lugano's first team before the 1992–93 Nationalliga A season. He had seven league appearances and played in the Swiss Cup final as Lugano won 4–1 against Grasshopper Club to lift the trophy. Esposito then became a regular player and stayed with the team for four years.

=== Grasshopper Club ===
In 1996, Esposito signed for Grasshopper Club. Under head coach Christian Gross, Esposito played two seasons mainly in their starting eleven, winning the championship in the 1997–98 season. During this period, he also showed his goal scoring-abilities. However, then in the next season he lost his starting place, and he was used by the new head coach Rolf Fringer only as a joker. The club loaned him out to Extremadura for the second half of the 1998–99 season. After his loan period he returned to GC, now with head coach Roy Hodgson, for a further two season, winning the championship again in the 2000–01 season.

=== Cagliari and Saint-Étienne ===
In January 2001, Esposito signed with Italy's Cagliari Calcio in the Serie B. However, for the midfielder, this was a disappointing time, and Cagliari ended the 2000–01 Serie B season in the midfield 11th position. Just six months later, he moved to Saint-Étienne of France, playing their 2001–02 season in the French second division.

=== Basel ===
On 10 July 2002 it was announced that Esposito had signed a two-year contract with Swiss double winners FC Basel. He joined Basel's first team for their 2002–03 season with head coach Christian Gross, under whom he had played by the Grasshoppers. After playing in one test game, Esposito played his domestic league debut for his new club in the away game on 17 July as Basel won 1–0 against Young Boys. He scored his first goal for his new team in the home game in the St. Jakob-Park on 3 August. Esposito was substituted in and in the second minute of added time he scored the last goal of the game as Basel won 4–2 against Servette.

Basel's 2002–03 UEFA Champions League season started in the second qualifying round. After beating Žilina 4–1 on aggregate and Celtic on the away goals rule after a 3–3 aggregate, Basel advanced to the group stage. They ended this in second position behind Valencia, but ahead of Liverpool and Spartak Moscow to advance to the second group stage. They ended this in third position behind Manchester United and Juventus, but ahead of Deportivo La Coruña. Esposito played in 10 of the 16 European games. Basel ended their league season as runners-up, but in the cup they advanced to the final and here they beat Xamax 6–0 to defend the title that they had won a season earlier.

In their 2003–04 league season the team started well, winning their first 13 matches straight out. The first defeat came on matchday 24. Basel won the championship.

However, Esposito's form had started to fade, and head coach Gross left him on the bench more often than not. During the winter break, Esposito decided to retire from professional football, and his contract was dissolved. In his eighteen months with the club, Esposito played a total of 60 games for Basel, scoring a total of seven goals. 29 of these games were in the Swiss Super League, three in the Swiss Cup, 11 in the UEFA competitions (Champions League and Europa League) and 17 were friendly games. He scored four goals in the domestic league and three in the cup.

=== Later years ===
In January 2004, Esposito joined A.S. Varese 1910 in the Serie C1, third tier of Italian football. At the end of the 2003–04 Serie C1, Varese suffered relegation. Esposito then joined FC Mendrisio in the third tier of Swiss football and six months later moved on to Lugano, who at this time played in the second tier. After six months, he moved to AC Malcantone in the fifth tier.

== International career ==
Between 1997 and 2001, Esposito was called up into the Swiss national squad and played three international matches with them. He had played two games with the U-21 team earlier.

== Honours ==
Lugano

- Swiss Cup: 1992–93

Grasshopper Club

- Swiss Championship: 1997–98, 2000–01

FC Basel

- Swiss Cup: 2002–03
- Swiss Super League: 2003–04

== Sources ==
- Die ersten 125 Jahre. Publisher: Josef Zindel im Friedrich Reinhardt Verlag, Basel. ISBN 978-3-7245-2305-5
- Verein "Basler Fussballarchiv" Homepage
