= Pascal Zuberbühler =

Swiss footballer (born 1971)

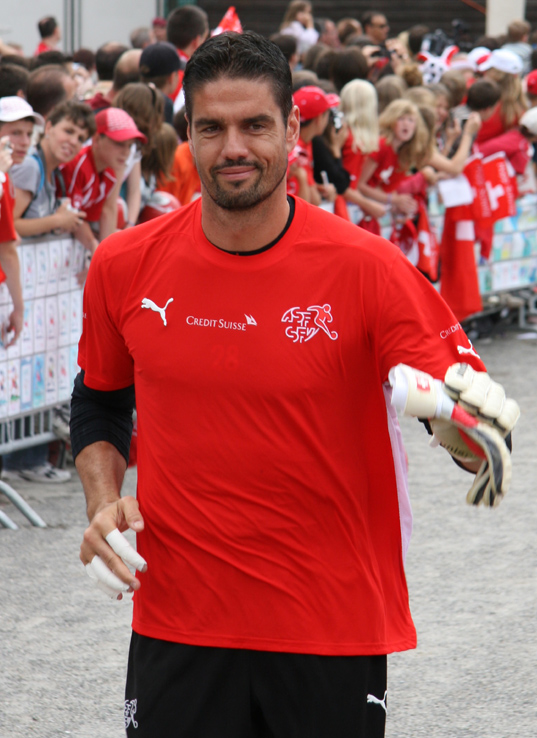
- Zuberbühler with Switzerland in 2008

Personal information
- Full name: Pascal Zuberbühler
- Date of birth: 8 January 1971 (age 55)
- Place of birth: Frauenfeld, Switzerland
- Height: 1.97 m (6 ft 6 in)
- Position: Goalkeeper

Youth career
- 1983–1992: Frauenfeld

Senior career*
Years	Team	Apps	(Gls)
1992–1999	Grasshoppers	187	(0)
1999–2006	Basel	178	(0)
2000	→ Aarau (loan)	2	(0)
2000–2001	→ Bayer Leverkusen (loan)	14	(0)
2006–2007	West Bromwich Albion	15	(0)
2007–2008	Neuchâtel Xamax	51	(0)
2008–2011	Fulham	0	(0)
Total		446	(0)

International career
1994–2008	Switzerland	51	(0)

Managerial career
- 2011: Philippines (goalkeeper coach)
- 2011–2012: Young Boys (goalkeeper coach)
- 2012: Philippines (goalkeeper coach)
- 2013–2015: Servette (goalkeeper coach)
- 2015: Philippines (goalkeeper coach)
- 2015–2017: Derby County (goalkeeper coach)
- * Club domestic league appearances and goals

Pascal "Zubi" Zuberbühler (born 8 January 1971) is a Swiss former professional footballer who played as a goalkeeper.

He played in the Swiss Super League for Grasshoppers, Basel and Neuchâtel Xamax. He also had a season on loan to Bayer Leverkusen of the Bundesliga, and late in his career he represented West Bromwich Albion and Fulham in England.

Zuberbühler earned 51 caps for Switzerland between 1994 and 2008 and was selected for UEFA Euro 2004, the 2006 FIFA World Cup and UEFA Euro 2008. At the middle tournament, Switzerland were the only team in the competition's history to be eliminated without conceding a goal.

== Club career ==
=== Early career ===
Born in Frauenfeld, Thurgau, Zuberbühler played his youth football with local amateur club Frauenfeld and advanced to their first team, who at that time played in the 1st League, the third tier of Swiss football. During the winter break of the 1991–92 Nationalliga A season he transferred to and signed his first professional contract with Grasshoppers. He played his league debut for his new club on 8 April 1992 in the away game against Lausanne-Sport. The game ended in a 1–1 draw. Zuberbühler played with GC for seven and a half years. During this time, he made 187 league appearances for Grasshoppers, winning the Nationalliga A three times (1994–95, 1995–96, 1997–98) and the Swiss Cup once (1993–94).

=== Basel ===
Zuberbühler joined Basel 's first team for their 1999–2000 season under new head-coach Christian Gross. The two clubs made a goalkeeper swap with Stefan Huber. After playing in one test match and one UI Cup game, Zuberbühler played his domestic league debut for his new club in the away game on 7 July 1999, as Basel drew 1–1 with Lugano. In the 50th minute, Zuberbühler was substituted out of the game with a head wound.

The following season, after just three league matches, Basel accepted an enquiry from Bayer Leverkusen. Zuberbühler was loaned out to them under head-coach Christoph Daum for the season. Zuberbühler played 13 league games and five Champions League games for them. But, after a few months, he was replaced between the posts by Adam Matysek under the new coach Berti Vogts. As he was being mobbed by his own fans, Zuberbühler decided to leave Leverkusen. His contract was dissolved in March 2001.

After his loan period, when he returned to Basel, his replacement Miroslav König had been playing so well that head-coach Gross did not want to change the starting team. Zuberbühler was loaned out to Aarau for the rest of the season. For Aarau, he made two league appearances. In the 2001–02 season, Zuberbühler was again first choice goalkeeper with Basel and played in all the competitive games (league, cup and UI Cup). Zuberbühler won the double with the club and advanced to the final of the UI Cup, but here they suffered defeat; Aston Villa won 5–2 on aggregate.

Zuberbühler made a name for himself with his saves in a 1–1 tie with Liverpool in a Champions League game on 25 September 2002. In the 2002–03 season, Basel were runners-up in the league, but they were able to repeat the cup win. Zuberbühler held a clean sheet as Basel beat Xamax 6–0 in the final.

In the 2003–04 season and 2004–05 season, Zuberbühler and Basel were able to win the domestic league championship another two times. Between the years 1999 and 2006, Zuberbühler played a total of 340 games for Basel. 214 of these games were in the Swiss Super League, 20 in the Swiss Cup, 20 in the Champions League, 24 in the UEFA Cup, 11 in the UI Cup and 51 were friendly games.

=== West Bromwich Albion ===
Zuberbühler signed a two-year contract for West Bromwich Albion on a free transfer from Basel on 14 July 2006. His first appearance in an Albion shirt was in a friendly against Motherwell, where he earned praise from his manager Bryan Robson. He then kept a clean sheet on his competitive début as Albion beat Hull City 2–0 on 5 August.

Zuberbühler was dropped from the first team by new manager Tony Mowbray after starting 15 games, apparently due to the fans booing and sarcastically applauding him when he played. Mowbray made him available for loan in November. He returned to the first team after Russell Hoult was suspended, and responded by keeping a clean sheet in the 3–0 FA Cup win at rivals Wolverhampton Wanderers on 28 January 2007, but it proved to be his last game for the club. New signing Dean Kiely immediately replaced him in the first team, and he felt this harmed his chances for Euro 2008, due to be held in his home country. In February 2007, he was told by his club that he was "surplus to requirements", and that they would not stand in his way should a club come in for him. He signed an 18-month contract at Swiss side Neuchatel Xamax, moving there on a free transfer.

=== Fulham ===
In July 2008, on the invitation of former Switzerland national team boss Roy Hodgson, Zuberbühler joined Fulham on trial. He first appearance for the club was against South Korean side Busan I'Park as a second-half substitute for David Stockdale in a 1–0 defeat. On 6 August, Fulham signed him on a one-year deal. He made his only appearance on 23 September in the third round of the League Cup, a 1–0 loss away to Championship club Burnley.

He earned a new one-year contract in June 2009. In the 2009–10 season, he fell behind Stockdale in the pecking order, but eventually fought his way back to being Mark Schwarzer's back-up and was in the matchday squad for the Europa League Final. He had signed another one-year deal to remain at Craven Cottage, but was not picked for the team's Premier League squad for the 2010–11 season and faced an uncertain future at the club. On 1 July 2011, Fulham confirmed that Zuberbühler had left the club on a free transfer, after coming to the end of his contract.

== International career ==
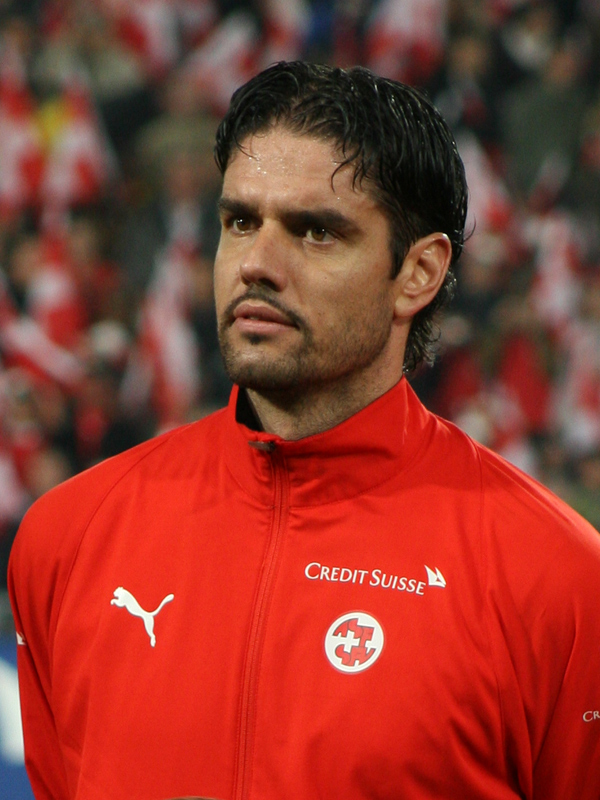
Zuberbühler in 2006

Zuberbühler was capped 51 times by Switzerland and was a member of their squads for the Euro 2004, 2006 FIFA World Cup and Euro 2008, all under the management of Kobi Kuhn.

At the 2006 World Cup in Germany, Switzerland topped a group ahead of France, South Korea, and Togo, then lost in the last 16 on penalties against Ukraine; he saved the Ukrainians' first penalty from Andriy Shevchenko. This Swiss team are the only team in the history of the World Cup not to concede a goal.

On 15 June 2008, he played his last game with the Swiss national team, during the 2–0 victory over Portugal in Euro 2008, held in his home country.

== Coaching career ==
Zuberbühler had a short stint as the Philippines national football team goalkeeping coach, reuniting with Fulham teammate Neil Etheridge, prior to the first round first leg 2014 World Cup qualifier against Sri Lanka in June 2011. From July 2011 to April 2012, he was the goalkeeping coach of Young Boys. He returned to the Philippines for a second spell in November 2012, ahead of the 2012 AFF Suzuki Cup, and again in 2015. In between, from 2013 to 2015, he was the goalkeeper coach of Servette FC.

In June 2015, Zuberbühler joined Derby County as a goalkeeping coach. He left in March 2017 when new manager Gary Rowett placed Kevin Poole in his position. In November that year, he was hired as a goalkeeping specialist for FIFA.

Sporting positions
Preceded by Murat Yakin	Basel captain 2004–2006	Succeeded by Ivan Ergic
