= Vladimír Staš =

Slovak footballer

Personal information
- Full name: Vladimír Staš
- Date of birth: 19 April 1976 (age 50)
- Place of birth: Czechoslovakia
- Height: 1.78 m (5 ft 10 in)
- Position: Left back

Senior career*
Years	Team	Apps	(Gls)
–2002	Prešov	61	(0)
2002–2005	Žilina	28	(2)
2005–2007	Prešov		
2008–2010	Karviná		
2010–2017	Bardejov		
- * Club domestic league appearances and goals as of 19 December 2017 ‡ National team caps and goals as of 3 April 2011

Vladimír Staš (born 19 April 1976) is a Slovak football defender.
