= Cyril Špendla =

Slovak footballer

Personal information
- Full name: Cyril Špendla
- Date of birth: 22 August 1979 (age 47)
- Place of birth: Šaľa, Czechoslovakia
- Height: 1.85 m (6 ft 1 in)
- Position: Centre back

Youth career
- Šaľa
- Nitra

Senior career*
Years	Team	Apps	(Gls)
?–2000	Šaľa		
2000–2004	Žilina		
2004–2009	MFK Dubnica		
- * Club domestic league appearances and goals as of 14 July 2011

Cyril Špendla (born 22 August 1979 in Šaľa) is a former Slovak football defender who recently played for club MFK Dubnica.
