= Marián Klago =

Czech footballer

Personal information
- Date of birth: 6 July 1971 (age 55)
- Height: 1.80 m (5 ft 11 in)
- Position: Midfielder

Senior career*
Years	Team	Apps	(Gls)
1991–1993	Dukla Banská Bystrica		
1993–1995	Spartak Trnava		
1995–1996	Union Cheb		
1996–1999	Slovan Liberec		
1998	→ Kaučuk Opava (loan)		
1999	→ Nitra (loan)		
2000	Bohemians		
2000	Trenčín		
2001	Stavo Artikel Brno		
2001	Trenčín		
2002–2004	Žilina		
- * Club domestic league appearances and goals

Marián Klago (born 6 July 1971) is a retired Slovak football midfielder.
