= André Luís (footballer, born 1977) =

Brazilian footballer

Personal information
- Full name: André Luis dos Santos Reis
- Date of birth: 6 May 1977 (age 49)
- Place of birth: São Paulo, Brazil
- Position: Goalkeeper

Senior career*
Years	Team	Apps	(Gls)
2002–2007	Ituano	350	(0)
2007	Atlético Sorocaba		
2007	Portuguesa		
2008	Sertãozinho		
2008	Portuguesa		
2009	Paulista		
2009–2011	Noroeste		
2010	→ Criciúma (loan)		
2011	Santo André		
2012	Comercial-SP		
2013	Monte Azul		
2014–2015	Anapolina		
2016	Capivariano		
2016	Mirassol		
2016	Rio Verde-GO		
2017	FC Cascavel		
- * Club domestic league appearances and goals as of 1 December 2023

André Luis dos Santos Reis (born 6 May 1977), simply known as André Luís, is a Brazilian former professional footballer who played as a goalkeeper.

== Career ==
Athlete who has made the most appearances for Ituano FC with 350 matches, André Luís was the starter in winning the state championship in 2002, in addition to being included in the club's hall of fame. He played for several other clubs, most of which were teams from the interior of São Paulo such as Santo André and Capivariano.

== Honours ==
Ituano

- Campeonato Paulista: 2002

Rio Verde

- Campeonato Goiano Second Division: 2016
