= 2005–06 FC Thun season =

FC Thun
2005–06 season
- Manager: (Switzerland) Urs Schönenberger (until February) (Switzerland) Adrian Kunz (caretaker) (Austria) Heinz Peischl (from February)
- Stadium: Stadion Lachen (domestic competitions); Stade de Suisse Wankdorf (European competitions)
- Swiss Super League: 5th
- UEFA Champions League: Group stage
- UEFA Cup: Round of 32

During the 2005–06 Swiss football season, FC Thun competed in the Swiss Super League.

== Season summary ==
Thun defeated Dynamo Kyiv and Malmö to reach the Champions League group stage for the first (and, as of 2012, only) time in their history, where they were drawn in Group B with English giants Arsenal, four-time winners Ajax of the Netherlands and Czech champions Sparta Prague. Thun finished third and were knocked out of the Champions League, although there was consolation as they were demoted to the third round UEFA Cup, their first appearance in Europe's secondary cup competition. The European adventure couldn't last though, as they were knocked out by German giants Hamburg.

== Players ==
=== First-team squad ===
Squad at end of season

Note: Flags indicate national team as defined under FIFA eligibility rules; some limited exceptions apply. Players may hold more than one non-FIFA nationality.

No.	Pos.	Nation	Player
2	DF	BRA	Leandro Vieira
4	DF	SUI	Sehid Sinani
5	DF	AUS	Ljubo Milicevic
7	DF	SUI	Grégory Duruz
8	FW	BRA	Gelson
9	MF	BRA	Adriano Pimenta
11	DF	SUI	Andres Gerber
12	DF	CMR	Armand Deumi
13	FW	SEN	Pape Omar Faye
14	MF	SUI	Nenad Savić (Note: Savić was born in SFR Yugoslavia (now Serbia), but also qualified to represent Switzerland internationally and represented Switzerland at U-21 level.)
15	MF	GER	Eren Şen

No.	Pos.	Nation	Player
16	MF	SUI	Roman Friedli (Note: Friedli was born in Kathmandu, Nepal, but also qualified to represent Switzerland internationally and represented Switzerland at U-21 level.) (on loan from Young Boys)
17	DF	AUT	Alen Orman (Note: Orman was born in Bugojno, SFR Yugoslavia (now Bosnia and Herzegovina), but also qualified to represent Austria internationally and made his international debut for Austria in November 2002.)
18	GK	SUI	Alain Portmann
19	MF	SUI	Silvan Aegerter
21	MF	SUI	Nelson Ferreira
23	MF	SUI	Önder Çengel (Note: Çengel was born in Kahramanmaraş, Turkey, but also qualified to represent Switzerland internationally and represented Switzerland at U-21 level.)
24	MF	SEN	Ibrahima Ba (on loan from CS Sfaxien)
25	DF	BRA	João Paulo di Fabio
26	DF	BIH	Selver Hodžić
28	GK	SUI	Daniel Lopar (on loan from FC Wil)
36	GK	SUI	Sascha Stulz

=== Left club during season ===
Note: Flags indicate national team as defined under FIFA eligibility rules; some limited exceptions apply. Players may hold more than one non-FIFA nationality.

No.	Pos.	Nation	Player
1	GK	SUI	Eldin Jakupović (Note: Jakupović was born in Kozarac, SFR Yugoslavia (now Bosnia and Herzegovina), and represented Bosnia and Herzegovina at U-21 level, but was raised in Switzerland and represented Switzerland at U-21 level before making his international debut for Switzerland in August 2008, but has since declared he will not play for Switzerland again.) (on loan from Grasshoppers)
3	DF	POR	José Gonçalves (to FBK Kaunas)
6	DF	BRA	Tiago Bernardini (to Slovácko)
7	DF	SUI	Henry Siqueira-Barras (Note: Siqueira was born in Brazil, but also qualified to represent Switzerland internationally and represented Switzerland at U-17, U-19 and U-20 level.) (released)
10	DF	BRA	Adriano Spadoto (released)

No.	Pos.	Nation	Player
17	FW	SUI	Adrian Moser (to Düdingen)
20	FW	SUI	Mauro Lustrinelli (to Sparta Prague)
22	DF	ESP	David Pallas (to VfL Bochum)
23	DF	SUI	Lukas Schenkel (to Young Boys)

== Results ==
=== Champions League ===
==== Second qualifying round ====
26 July 2005	Dynamo Kyiv (Ukraine)	2–2	(Switzerland) Thun	Lobanovsky Dynamo Stadium, Kyiv
	Husyev 20'; Shatskikh 40'		Lustrinelli 28'; Aegerter 66'

3 August 2005	Thun (Switzerland)	1–0	(Ukraine) Dynamo Kyiv	Wankdorf Stadium, Bern
	Bernardini 90+'

==== Third qualifying round ====
10 August 2005	Malmö FF (Sweden)	0–1	(Switzerland) Thun	Malmö Stadion, Malmö
			Pimenta 34'

23 August 2005	Thun (Switzerland)	3–0	(Sweden) Malmö FF	Stade de Suisse Wankdorf, Bern
	Bernardini 26'; Lustrinelli 40', 66'

==== Group stage ====
14 September 2005	Arsenal (England)	2–1	(Switzerland) Thun	Highbury, London
20:45	Gilberto 51'; Bergkamp 90+2'	Report	Ferreira 53'	Attendance: 34,500; Referee: Grzegorz Gilewski (Poland)

27 September 2005	Thun (Switzerland)	1–0	(Czech Republic) Sparta Prague	Stade de Suisse, Bern
20:45	Hodžić 89'	Report		Attendance: 30,800; Referee: Bertrand Layec (France)

18 October 2005	Ajax (Netherlands)	2–0	(Switzerland) Thun	Amsterdam Arena, Amsterdam
20:45	Anastasiou 36', 55'	Report		Attendance: 44,775; Referee: Roberto Rosetti (Italy)

2 November 2005	Thun (Switzerland)	2–4	(Netherlands) Ajax	Stade de Suisse, Bern
20:45	Lustrinelli 56'; Adriano 74'	Report	Sneijder 27'; Anastasiou 63' de Jong 90+1'; Boukhari 90+3'	Attendance: 30,120; Referee: Vladimír Hriňák (Slovakia)

22 November 2005	Thun (Switzerland)	0–1	(England) Arsenal	Stade de Suisse, Bern
20:45		Report	Pires 88' (pen.)	Attendance: 31,330; Referee: Lucílio Batista (Portugal)

7 December 2005	Sparta Prague (Czech Republic)	0–0	(Switzerland) Thun	Sparta Stadium, Prague
20:45		Report		Attendance: 15,000; Referee: Mike Riley (England)

=== UEFA Cup ===
==== Round of 32 ====
15 February 2006	Thun (Switzerland)	1–0	(Germany) Hamburg	Stade de Suisse, Wankdorf, Bern
18:30	Adriano 30'	Report		Referee: Martin Hansson (Sweden)

23 February 2006	Hamburg (Germany)	2–0	(Switzerland) Thun	Volksparkstadion, Hamburg
18:30	Van Buyten 2', 33'	Report		Referee: Alon Yefet (Israel)
