= 2001–02 FC Basel season =

FC Basel
2001–02 season
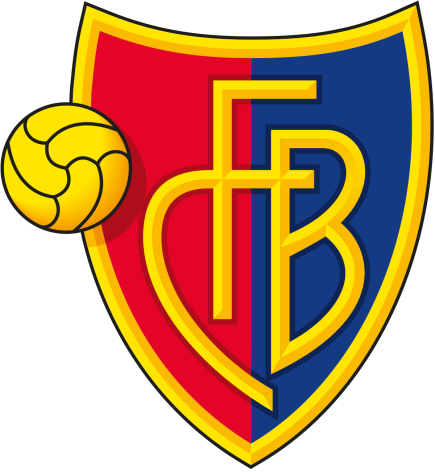
- Club president: René C. Jäggi
- Head coach: Christian Gross
- Stadium: St. Jakob-Park
- 2001–02 NLA qualification round: 1st of 12
- Championship round: 1st of 8
- 2001–02 Swiss Cup: Winners
- 2001–02 Intertoto Cup: Runners-up
- Top goalscorer: League: Christian Giménez (26); All: Christian Giménez (32)
- Highest home attendance: 33,433 vs Grasshoppers (02.12.2001); 33,433 vs Grasshoppers (14.04.2002); 33,433 vs St. Gallen (27.04.2002); 33,433 vs Lugano (08.05.2002)
- Lowest home attendance: 17,844 vs Servette (11.07.2001); 6,843 vs Grindavík (01.07.2001)

The 2001–02 season was the Fussball Club Basel 1893's 109th season in the club's history and their 8th consecutive season in the Nationalliga A, the top flight of Swiss football. Basel played their home games in the newly constructed St. Jakob-Park complex. Club chairman was René C. Jäggi for the sixth consecutive season.

== Overview ==
=== Off-season and pre-season ===
Christian Gross was the first team trainer for the third successive season. The club's main aim for the 2001–02 season was to win the Swiss Nationalliga A championship title. The second aim was to win the cup title. Their third aim was to stay in the 2001 UEFA Intertoto Cup as long as possible, if possible, win the final and secure the team's progress at least to the UEFA Cup.

New, with professional contracts for the new season, Philipp Degen and Marco Streller were brought up from the youth team. Further, Pascal Zuberbühler returned from a one-year loan with Bayer Leverkusen. Basel's biggest signing for the new season were Scott Chipperfield, who came from Wollongong Wolves, and Christian Giménez, who was signed from Lugano. Further, Marco Zwyssig transferred in from Tirol Innsbruck.

In the other direction, Iván Knez transferred out to Rapid Wien and Feliciano Magro returned to Udinese after his loan period ended. Further, André Muff was loaned out to Lugano and Jean-Michel Tchouga was loaned out to Lausanne-Sport. Soon after the season started, Marco Streller was loaned out to Concordia Basel.

On 16 June FCB announced that Marcel Herzog had transferred to them from Concordia Basel. On the 5 September the club announced that Miroslav König was loaned out to Concordia as countertrade. On 15 October this was reversed, as König returned to FCB and Herzog went back to Concordia.

=== Winter break ===
Soon after the winter break, in the second half of the season, Oliver Kreuzer retired from his active football career. Between the years 1997 and 2002 Kreuter played a total of 212 games for Basel scoring a total of 32 goals. 136 of these games were in the Nationalliga A, 9 in the Swiss Cup, 17 were in UEFA competitions (UEFA Cup and UIC) and 50 were friendly games. He scored 21 goals in the domestic league, 1 in the Cup, 3 in the European competitions and the other seven were scored during the test games.

=== Off-season ===
At the end of the season Massimo Ceccaroni retired from his professional career. Ceccaroni is still considered to be a cult figure in Basel. This is not only because of his loyalty, having spent 25 years with the club, 10 years as youth player and 15 with their first team. But also, because of the fact that he never scored a goal in the top-flight of Swiss football. However, because he did not have many team appearances during this season, five in the league and six in the UIC, the club decided not renew his contract and Ceccaroni's professional career came to an end. Between the years 1987 and 2002 Ceccaroni played a total of 605 games for Basel's first team scoring a total of six goals. 398 of these games were in the Nationalliga A and Nationalliga B, 34 in the Swiss Cup, 20 in the European competitions (UEFA cup and UIC) and 153 were friendly games. He scored four of his goals in the Nationalliga B and the other two were scored during the test games.

== The Campaign ==
=== Friendly games ===
Basel started the season off with three warm-up matches. These were played against BSC Young Boys from the Nationalliga A, FC Thun and Yverdon-Sports from the Nationalliga B.

=== Domestic league ===
The qualification round to the 2001–02 Nationalliga A was contested by twelve teams. The first eight teams of the regular season, or qualification round, then competed in the championship round. Three points were given for a victory and one for a draw. Each team took half of the points, rounded up to complete units, that were won in the qualification round into the second stage as bonus. The teams in the ninth to twelfth positions completed with the top four teams of the Nationalliga B in a Nationalliga A/B playoff round.

The regular season started on 15 July and ended on 10 December. The championship play-offs began on 25 February 2001 and ended on 26 May. FCB’s aim for the teams was to end the qualification round in the tables top two or three and then in the championship round to win the title, or at least to reach third position which would qualify them for the 2001–02 UEFA Cup.

qualifying round

The season started in the worst possible way. In their first game away against FC Sion, Basel suffered a humiliating defeat. The home team were two goals up within half an hour and then on 38 minutes Hakan Yakin saw the red card for insulting the referee. In the second half Basel went completely under. First Julien Poueys scored a hattrick within 7 minutes (55, 59, 62) and then Samuel Ojong also scored a hattrick within 7 minutes (79, 81, 86). Basel were beaten 8–1. In the next game on 11 July 2001, a 3–1 home win in St. Jakob-Park against Servette, Marco Streller played his League debut being substituted in during the 66th Minute. Unfortunately for him, in the last minute of the game he headed in an own goal as he tried to clear a corner kick. It was to remain Streller's only game for Basel in this season, because he was loaned to feeder club FC Concordia Basel for the rest of the season. Christian Giménez was to play his debut on 18 July in the 3–3 draw with St. Gallen and his first goal for the club was to follow during the 3–1 home win against the Young Boys on the 11 August. Giménez was to end the qualifying round as the league’s top scorer with 19 goals in 20 appearances.

After five games Basel were straggling, they had achieved just one win and one draw, opposed to three defeats, with 7 to 15 goal tally. But hereafter, things turned for the better and they only suffered two further defeats up until the winter break. Despite the fact that these were against the reigning title holders Grasshopper Club, Basel ended the qualification as league leaders, five points ahead of Lugano and six ahead of the reigning champions.

Championship round

Basel started well into the second part of the season, winning their first four games, 5–2 away against second placed Lugano and 1–0, 2–0 and 4–0 at home against Zürich, Young Boys and Sion. In the fifth game they suffered another defeat against GC, but six straight wins followed, including their revenge 3–0 away victory against Sion and a revenge 4–1 victory against GC. During this period of the season FCB played their best football and pulled away at the top of the table and subsequently achieved the championship title prematurely. Despite the fact that they lost two of their last three games, they won their first title after 22 years of waiting. It was the ninth championship title in the club’s history.

Christian Giménez was the team’s top scorer with 26 goals over the entire season. Hakan Yakin had scored 13, George Koumantarakis scored 10 and Scott Chipperfield scored 6 goals.

Conclusion

Basel won the championship with 55 points, GC were vice-champions with 45 points and Lugano finished in third position. The club's aim in the championship title had been fully, and perhaps surprisingly, achieved. Both Lugano and Sion had reached the championship round, but both clubs did not obtain a 1st level license for the 2002/03 season and therefore both teams were relegated to the second tier.

Curiosity to the begin of Scott Chipperfield's career by FC Basel; Chipperfield signed his contract with the club and returned to Australia to pack his suitcases. As he boarded the plane to fly to his new employers, he knew that they would be playing their first game of the season during his time on the flight. When the plane landed in Switzerland the game was over and Basel had lost 1–8. The story goes that Chipperfield asked the driver who collected him, "who the heck have I signed for? The only reason I didn't fly straight back home, was because I knew you were waiting for me." At the end of the season Basel were number one and Sion were relegated. And the driver said to Chipperfield, "I'm sure glad that you knew that it was me, who was waiting to collect you at the airport."

=== Domestic Cup ===
Basel's clear aim for the Swiss Cup was to win the title, especially because the final was to be played in St. Jakob-Park. They had last won the trophy in 1975. Basel entered the competition in the round of 32 and were drawn away against local rivals Concordia Basel, who at that time played in the Nationalliga B.

Concordia Basel (10 November 2001)

The game was played in the St. Jakob-Park with an attendance of 5,431 spectators. Concordia, the home team, started well into the game and had their first chance at goal on 5 minutes and their second chance another 5 minutes later. FCB started prudent and did not want to enter into risky situations. After they had won control of play, they started to dominate and had a couple of near misses. Then on 21 minutes Sébastien Barberis put the away team a goal up following a corner-kick. Concordia reacted immediately, with fighting spirit and came forward with tempo. Their first attack could only be stopped by a well-timed foul from FCB defender Alexandre Quennoz, who saw the yellow card. If he had waited a few seconds longer it might have been a penalty. FCB were always in danger of catching the equaliser, but despite doubling the lead on 41 minutes through a goal from George Koumantarakis, Concordia were dominating play. After the interval Concordia were still fighting, believing in their chance. On 59 minutes Christian Giménez added Basel’s third after a counter attack. From this moment on the game changed. Concordia had less and less stamina and their strengths were lost. Basel took control and dominated completely and on 75 minutes Hervé Tum added a fourth and on 90 minutes the last. FCB won 5–0 and advanced to the next round.

Colombier ( 17 February 2002)

In the round of 16 Basel were drawn with an away game against lower league team Colombier, who had that time played in 1. Liga Promotion, the third tier in the Swiss football pyramid. Colombier were playing good football and were top of their division at that time. At the end of the season, they were group champions, but missed promotion in the play-offs. The match was played in the New Year before the leagues had restarted after the winter break. This proved to be an advantage for Basel after their seven winter break friendlies. The team were well played in and won the game that they entirely dominated 1–0 through a goal from Giménez in the 56th minute.

Zürich (21 March 2002)

In the quarter-finals Basel were drawn away against Zürich. The match was played in the Letzigrund with an attendance of 6,800 spectators and came midst in the period as Basel were dominating in the league. Both teams started into the match with care, but FCB found quicker into their stride and soon had more possession. Therefore, it was no surprise that they took the lead through a goal from George Koumantarakis on 17 minutes. The home team reacted well, they sought after the equaliser and didn’t have to wait long, because Kanga Akalé netted on 24 minutes. The game was now level on possession until one minute before the break, as Ivan Ergic put the visitors back into the lead. After the interval play was again level, but the visitors did have an optical advantage. This became obvious as Akalé saw the yellow card for his second bookable foul and was dismissed. From this moment the game changed, the Zürich layers strength and stamina failed and Basel took control and dominated. On 85 minutes substitute Carlos Varela advanced down the right and put his team another goal up. Just two minutes later Basel’s other substitute Hervé Tum had a shot that hit the post and Scott Chipperfield converted the rebound to give Basel a comfortable 4–1 win.

Young Boys (11 April 2002)

In the semi-final Basel were drawn at home in the St. Jakob-Park against an out of form Young Boys, who had only picked up only one point in their last three league matches. Basel started better into the match, with good moves they created a number of chances. Alain Rochat stopped one of these with a foul inside the penalty area and was shown the yellow card by referee Massimo Busacca, but the spot kick from Murat Yakin rebounded from the post on 17 minutes. Basel came forwards, again created chances and Christian Giménez converted one of these after 23 minutes to put the hosts one up. At the other end Gürkan Sermeter missed the equaliser as Basel keeper Pascal Zuberbühler saved his penalty kick. Basel remained in control of the game up until the interval. Although Carlos Varela had a shot on 49 minutes that hit the cross bar, the visitors started the second period with more determination and were rewarded on 51 minutes as Joel Descloux equalised for his team. The game became more aggressive and was an open slugfest. Amidst a number of bookings for over hard fouls, on 69 minutes Basel defender Philippe Cravero was shown the red card for a foul as last man and at the other end on 73 minutes YB keeper Paolo Collaviti was also dismissed for committing a foul as last man. The score remained 1–1 even after extra time, so a penalty shoot-out was required for the decision. In this Basel keeper Zuberbühler became major protagonist. Zuberbühler missed his own spot-kick as YB reserve keeper Adrian Lingenhag saved, but in return he himself saved three YB penalty attempts. Basel advanced to the final

Grasshoppers (12 May 2002)

The final was played in the St. Jakob-Park with an attendance of 30,000 spectators and according to the draw the Grasshoppers were the home team. Basel started well into the game. GC were stopped in their forwards movement and Basel played a long ball in the opponent’s half towards Hervé Tum, who ran on and beat the advancing keeper Fabrice Borer from 12 metres. The match was played on level terms with chances on both sides. On 38 minutes Richard Núñez advanced on the right, turning on himself he played a long cross towards the far post, here Mladen Petrić ran clear and nodded in the equaliser. Two minutes before the break a goal from Basel’s captain Murat Yakin was disallowed because he had used his hand to control the ball. In the second period play remained level, again both teams created chances. However, neither keeper let a ball pass and so it came to extra time. In the 113th minute Scott Chipperfield played a high ball from the left, over GC goalie Borer, which Boris Smiljanic punched over the cross bar with his last effort, this because he assumed that Hervé Tum, who was positioned behind him, would nod the ball effortlessly into the goal. This opened the big stage for the Basel captain, Murat Yakin took a run-up and safely converted the penalty kick to win the final 2–1 and thus the Trophy.

Conclusion

From a FCB point of view, the club's cup aim to reach the final and win the trophy was achieved. Because the league championship title had mathematically and prematurely been decided, with this trophy Basel had achieved the domestic double.

=== UEFA Intertoto Cup ===
Basel were qualified for the UIC in the [[2001 UEFA Intertoto Cup#Second round|]], which started for Basel on the 30 June 2002. The UIC was divided into three groups with three finals, the winners of these finals advanced to the 2001–02 UEFA Cup. Basel’s clear aim for the competition was to reach the final and win it, to qualify to the UEFA Cup first round.

Second round, Grindavík

Basel were drawn against Iceland's Grindavík. They had qualified by beating Vilash Masallı 3–1 on aggregate in the first round. The first leg took place in the St. Jakob-Park in front of 6,843 fans. Basel won 3–0 and the goal scorers were Feliciano Magro in the 4th minute, Jean-Michel Tchouga in the 18th minute and Hervé Tum in the 60th.

The second leg was in Iceland, played in the Grindavíkurvöllur with an attendance of 700 spectators. Two goals from André Muff the first on 14 minutes and the second on 80 minutes gave Basel a 2–0 victory, thus 5–0 on aggregate.

Third round, Heerenveen

The next round saw Basel matched against SC Heerenveen, a Dutch club from the Eredivisie. Again, the first leg was played in the St. Jakob-Park, the attendance was 8,059 fans. Basel controlled the game from the beginning and took an early two goal lead through George Koumantarakis on 12 minutes and Hakan Yakin on 20 minutes. In the second period the visitors got into the game and on 56 minutes Mika Nurmela pulled a goal back. Basel overstood a hectic period and played down the time to win 2–1.

The second leg in Abe Lenstra Stadion had an attendance of 13,300 fans. Marcus Allbäck on 4 minutes gave SC Heerenveen an early lead. George Koumantarakis on 8 minutes and Hakan Yakin on 23 minutes turned the tables. In the second period Hervé Tum in the 69th minute put the visitors another goal up. The home team reduced the score line as Anthony Lurling netted in the 75th minute, but the home team could not catch up. The score remained 3–2 for Basel and they advanced with a 5–3 aggregate.

Semi-finals, Lausanne

The semi-final was an all-Swiss affair with their Nationalliga A rivals Lausanne-Sport. These had qualified to this stage beating UE Sant Julià from Andora twice with 9–1 aggregate in the first round and Sturm Graz, with an away win and a home draw, 4–3 on aggregate in the second round. The first leg in the St. Jakob-Park attracted an attendance of 14,872 spectators. Christian Giménez with a quick brace in the 19th and 21st minute put Basel two up. Just before the half time whistle Hakan Yakin added a third goal and in the second period they let the time tick-out to win comfortably 3–0.

The second leg in the Stade Olympique de la Pontaise only attracted 2,050 fans but they saw an interesting match in which Lausanne’s Pape Thiaw was the main character. First, he put the home team a goal up after 8 minutes. However, this was equalised ten minutes later by Hervé Tum. In the 30th minute Pape Thiaw committed a nasty foul and was booked for the offence by Ukrainian referee Vasyl Melnychuk. Then, following a set piece, just before the break Pape Thiaw put his team back into the lead. On 51 minutes he showed his nasty side again and for his second bookable offence he was dismissed. With one man more on the field FCB dominated play, but apart from the equaliser on 61 minutes through Carlos Varela they could not take advantage of this fact. The game was drawn 2–2, but Basel won the tie 5–2 on aggregate.

Finals, Aston Villa

In the final Basel played against Aston Villa from the Premier League. Villa had finished in 8th position in the 2000–01 FA Premier League. They had qualified to the Final by beating NK Slaven Belupo 3–2 on aggregate in the third round and winning on away goals against Rennes in the semi-finals. Basel fancied their chances because their domestic had already played six rounds and the Premier League season had not started yet. The first leg of this final was played on 7 August 2001 in the St. Jakob-Park with an attendance of 25,879 fans.

Villa's reserve keeper Peter Enckelman played the match because Peter Schmeichel was injured and Enckelman was needed early as Basel made a bright start. Murat Yakin, who constantly troubled Villa full-back Mark Delaney, set up his younger brother Hakan with a very good chip over the defence. The striker advanced quickly to the area and left footed, shot powerfully, but the keeper dropped down well to save. About ten minutes later, Argentinian striker Gimenez beat Enckelman with a low, curling shot that glanced passed the right-hand post. Villa then found their way into the game and should have taken the lead on 25 minutes, but Mustapha Hadji missed the very good opportunity. There were few chances during the rest of the half, although Basle finished strongly, with the impressive Murat Yakin twice going close. The beginning of the second period was as evenly contested as the first, but on 59 minutes Villa’s captain Paul Merson scored their vital away goal, side-footing in from close range, after keeper Pascal Zuberbühler could only parry a hard shotHassan Kachloul. The hosts could have equalised with their next chance Jean-Michel Tchouga was unmarked inside the area, but his wild effort glanced over the crossbar. Basel did then restore parity on 74 minutes as substitute Carlos Varela ran forcefully into the area and following a powerful shot Enckelman could only parry and Gimenez side-footed the rebound home from close range. The game ended with this 1–1 draw.

The return leg was played on 21 August in Villa Park in Birmingham, which had an attendance of 39,513 spectators. Villa started well into the game and tried to create chances. Basel were happy to sit back and wait and stifle the Villa chances before they became dangerous. After quarter of an hour FCB switched up a gear and on the half an hour were rewarded for the attempt. Scott Chipperfield put the visitors a goal up, finishing off a good move from the right. Villa reacted and came forwards with tempo, they attempted to breach the visitors massive defence. This finally was successful in the 45th minute, Darius Vassell was the scorer. In the second half Basel seemed to lose control and Juan Pablo Ángel added Villa's second on 55 minutes. Basel fought back into the game and created dangerous chances, but it was the hosts who got the better as in the 78th minute Ángel added another. From here Basel were chanceless and David Ginola netted the fourth six minutes from the end. Villa won the match deservedly 4–1 and the tie 5–2 on aggregate.

Conclusion

Aston Villa's attendance of 39,513 versus Basel at Villa Park, represented the highest attendance for any Intertoto fixture that season. Basel achieved their absolute minimum aim for this competition, but their main aim had been missed, there would be no further European football for them this season.

== Club ==
=== The Management ===
Position	Staff
Manager	(Switzerland) Christian Gross
Assistant manager	(Switzerland) Ruedi Zbinden until 2 Jan. 2002
Assistant manager	(Switzerland) Fritz Schmid from 2 Jan. 2002
Fitness Coach	(Switzerland) Harry Körner
Goalkeeper Coach	(Switzerland) Thomas Grüter
Team Administrator	(Switzerland) Gustav Nussbaumer
Youth Team Coach U-21	(Switzerland) Heinz Hermann
Youth Team co-Coach	(Switzerland) Pascal Burger

Last updated: 2 January 2002
Source: FC Basel Marketing AG (2001). Rotblau: FC Basel 1893, Das Magazin. FC Basel Marketing AG. ISSN 1660-0878.

=== Other information ===
Club president and chairman	(Switzerland) Mr René C. Jäggi
Ground (capacity and dimensions)	St. Jakob-Park (33,333 / 120x80 m)

Source: Homepage FCB

== Players ==
=== First team squad ===
Note: Flags indicate national team as defined under FIFA eligibility rules; some limited exceptions apply. Players may hold more than one non-FIFA nationality.

No.	Pos.	Nation	Player
1	GK	SUI	Pascal Zuberbühler
2	DF	SUI	Massimo Ceccaroni
3	DF	SUI	Philippe Cravero
4	DF	SUI	Alexandre Quennoz
5	DF	GER	Oliver Kreuzer
6	MF	SUI	Benjamin Huggel
7	FW	CMR	Jean-Michel Tchouga
8	FW	ESP	Carlos Varela
9	MF	RSA	George Koumantarakis
10	MF	SUI	Hakan Yakin
11	FW	CMR	Hervé Tum
12	MF	SUI	Sébastien Barberis
13	FW	ARG	Christian Eduardo Giménez
14	FW	SUI	Nenad Savic

No.	Pos.	Nation	Player
15	DF	SUI	Murat Yakin
16	MF	TOG	Yao Aziawonou
17	MF	SUI	Mario Cantaluppi
18	GK	SUI	Romain Crevoisier
19	FW	SUI	André Muff
20	DF	SUI	Iván Knez
21	MF	ITA	Feliciano Magro
22	MF	YUG	Ivan Ergić
24	DF	CMR	Timothée Atouba
25	GK	SUI	Marcel Herzog
26	MF	AUS	Scott Chipperfield
28	DF	SUI	Marco Zwyssig
—	FW	SUI	Marco Streller
—	DF	SUI	Philipp Degen

==== Out on loan ====
19	FW	SUI	André Muff (to Lugano from 14 July 2001)
—	FW	SUI	Marco Streller (to Concordia from August 2001)
—	GK	SVK	Miroslav König (to Concordia from 5 September 2001 until 15 October 2001)
25	GK	SUI	Marcel Herzog (to Concordia from 15 October 2001)
16	MF	TOG	Yao Aziawonou (to FC Thun (loan) from 21 January 2002) until 12 March 2002

=== Transfers Summer 2001 ===
==== In ====
1	GK	SUI	Pascal Zuberbühler (from Bayer Leverkusen return after loan)
25	GK	SUI	Marcel Herzog (from Concordia Basel)
26	MF	AUS	Scott Chipperfield (from Wollongong Wolves)
13	FW	ARG	Christian Eduardo Giménez (from Concordia Basel)

==== Out ====
21	MF	ITA	Feliciano Magro (to Udinese end of loan)

=== Transfers Winter 2001–02 ===
==== In ====
24	DF	CMR	Timothée Atouba (from Neuchâtel Xamax)
28	DF	SUI	Marco Zwyssig (from FC Tirol Innsbruck)

==== Out ====
20	DF	SUI	Iván Knez (contract ended to Rapid Wien)

== Results and fixtures ==
=== Friendlies ===
==== Pre-season and mid-season ====
20 June 2001 Pre-season	Thun (Switzerland)	1–2	(Switzerland) Basel	Stadion Lachen, Thun
19:30	Rama 71' (1:1)	FCB summary	20' (0:1) Tum; 84' (1:2) Tchouga	Attendance: 600; Referee: (Switzerland) Schmied
Note: FCB without Zuberbühler, Cantaluppi, Koumantarakis, and Hakan Yakin (all rested), Savic (injured), as well as Ergic and König (on holiday until June 25). Thun is without Känel (injured), Parnela and Jurendic (both absent) and Haller (military service). Fair game, no yellow cards

23 June 2001 Exhibition game	Young Boys (Switzerland)	2–1	(Switzerland) Basel	Sportplatz, Pieterlen
16:00	Berisha 47' (1:1); Türker 58' (2:1)	FCB summary	35' (0:1) Tchouga	Attendance: 1,200; Referee: (Switzerland) Guido Wildhaber (Kerzers)
Note: YB without Bochud (injured), Tholot and Wardanjan (rested). FCB without Kreuzer, Hakan Yakin (rested), Murat Yakin, Herzog and Ergic (not in the squad) and without Cantaluppi and Savic (both injured). Fair game, no yellow cards

26 June 2001 Pre-season	Yverdon-Sport (Switzerland)	0–1	(Switzerland) Basel	Sportplatz Nau, Laufen
18:00	Cavin (yellow card) 85'	FCB summary	38' (0:1) Tchouga	Attendance: 650; Referee: (Switzerland) Andreas Schluchter (Schönenbuch)
Note: FCB without Huggel and Koumantarakis (rested), Murat Yakin (was ill), Savic and Cantaluppi (injured), as well as Crevoisier and König (not in the squad). Yverdon without Delay and Victor Diogo (both injured). Pitch in excellent condition.

5 October 2001 Mid-season	Basel (Switzerland)	1–0	(Germany) 1. FC Kaiserslautern	St. Jakob-Park, Basel
19:30	Tchouga 44' (1:0)	FCB summary	(yellow card) 16' Dominguez	Attendance: 3,500; Referee: (Switzerland) Guido Wildhaber (Kerzers)
Note: Basel with test player Sandro Burki from FC Zürich, but without Hakan and Murat Yakin (national team), Ergic (Yugoslavia U-21), Crevoisier, Kreuzer (not in the squad), Huggel, Cantaluppi, Koumantarakis, Ceccaroni and Savic (all injured). Kaiserslautern without Koch, Djorkaeff, Hristov, Lincoln, Lokvenc, Klose and Klos. Tactical change by Basel from the 58th minute, Cravero moved to central defense, Hasler to left-back. Burki took over on the right side of midfield, Tchouga moved to the center and Aziawonou to the left.

23 October 2001 Mid-season	SC Dornach (Switzerland)	1–7	(Switzerland) Basel	Gigersloch, Dornach
18:15	Weidmann 88' (1:7)	FCB summary	2' (0:1) Koumantarakis; 8' (o.g. 0:2) Dreier; 32' (0:3) Varela; 46' (0:4) Koumantarakis; 52' (0:5) Koumantarakis; 61' (0:6) Burki; 86' (0:7) Tchouga	Attendance: 150; Referee: (Switzerland) Jürg Burkhart
Note: Basel with 3 test players from U-21 team: Sehid Sinani, Patrick Wagner and Michel Banholzer, also with test player Sandro Burki from FC Zürich. No bookings in a fair match. 13th minute, a direct free kick from Cantaluppi landed on the crossbar. 85th minute, a shot from Tchouga hit the post.

13 November 2001 Mid-season	BSC Old Boys (Switzerland)	1–5	(Switzerland) Basel	Stadion Schützenmatte, Basel
19:30	Thomas Koster 46'; Diabira (yellow card) 83'	FCB summary	10' (0:1) Tchouga; 13' (0:2) Wagner; 26' (0:3) Yao; 30' (0:4) Tum; 44' (0:5) Banholzer	Attendance: 70; Referee: (Switzerland) Michael Huber
Note: Basel with 6 test players from U-21 team: Orazio Ferranti, Ali Oezcakmak, Danny Califf, Pietro Saccone, Patrick Wagner and Michel Banholzer and with Sandro Burki from FC Zürich. 32nd minute, a shot from Tchougas bounced off the crossbar.

==== Winter break and mid-season ====
19 January 2002 Winter break	1. FC Kaiserslautern (Germany)	1–2	(Switzerland) Basel	Betzenberg, Kaiserslautern
15:00	Knavs 49' (1:1)	FCB summary	39' (0:1) Ergić; 61' (1:2) Koumantarakis; (yellow card) 85' Knez	Attendance: 2,376; Referee: (Germany) Volker Raquet
Note: Kaiserslautern without Ramzy and West (both at the Africa Cup), Ognjenovic (not yet in the squad), and Buck, Dominguez, Petterson (dropped from the squad), Gabriel, Hristov, and Klos (all injured). Basel without Ceccaroni, M. Yakin, and Huggel (recovering), H. Yakin (minor calf bruise), and Savic and Tchouga (both injured). Tactical changes by FCB: followind the 46th minute: Barberis moved to central midfield following Degen's substitution. 70th minute: Barberis moved to right of midfield following Cantaluppi's substitution.

24 January 2002 Winter break	Basel (Switzerland)	2–0	(Switzerland) Neuchâtel Xamax	Europa-Stadion, Rheinfelden
18:00	Koumantarakis 37' (1:0); Cravero 53' (2:0)	FCB summary		Attendance: 500; Referee: (Germany) Volker Scherrer
Note: FCB without Huggel, M. Yakin, Ceccaroni, and Atouba (all injured), Ergic and Gimenez (both rested) and also without Zwyssig (who returned to Innsbruck). Fair game, no yellow cards

29 January 2002 Winter break	Las Palmas (Spain)	2–6	(Switzerland) Basel	Estadio Municipal, Maspalomas
11:00	Santacasino 64' (1:4); Juan Negro (79[2:4])	FCB summary	3' (0:1) Giménez; 15' (0:2) Giménez; 52' (0:3) Ergić; 58' (0:4) Giménez; 82' (2:5) Tum; 86' (2:6) Tum	Attendance: 30; Referee: (Spain) Diaz
Note: FCB without Yakin, Cravero, Ceccaroni, Atouba (all injured).

31 January 2002 Winter break	Las Palmas (Spain)	1–3	(Switzerland) Basel	Estadio Municipal, Maspalomas
11:30	Carmelo 33' (1:1)	FCB summary	20' (0:1) Chipperfield; 41' (1:2) Tum; 76' (1:3) Koumantarakis}	Attendance: 500; Referee: (Spain) Santana
Note: FCB without Ceccaroni, Huggel, Cravero, Cantaluppi and Atouba (all injured or carrying knocks). There were no bookings in a fair match. For FCB tactical change following Zwyssig's substitution, Savic moved to left-back, Barberis to the right, and Degen to the center.

4 February 2002 Winter break	AC Bellinzona (Switzerland)	2–5	(Switzerland) Basel	Stadio Comunale, Bellinzona
17:30	Miccolis 38' (1:1); Cavin 85' (2:4)	FCB summary	15' (0:1) Giménez; 38' (1:2) Giménez; 48' (1:3) Giménez; 71' (1:4) H. Yakin; 86' (2:5) H. Yakin	Attendance: 400; Referee: (Switzerland) Carlo Bertolini (Vira-Gambarogno)
Note: Bellinzona without Klötzli (injured). FCB without M. Ceccaroni, Cravero (both injured), Huggel, Tum, Quennoz (rested), Koumantarakis (was ill on the day), and Tchouga (not in the squad). Fair game, no yellow cards. Abysmal performances by both assistant referees.

9 February 2002 Winter break	Lausanne-Sport (Switzerland)	0–0	(Switzerland) Basel	Stadio Comunale Bellinzona
14:30		FCB summary		Referee: (Switzerland) Carlo Bertolini (Vira-Gambarogno)
Note: Lausanne without Charbonnier, Studer, Gobet (all injured), Meyer, Malnati, Portmann, Horjak, Aalai, Meoli, Simon (all absent, some with the Swiss U21 team). FCB without Hakan and Murat Yakin, Zuberbühler and Zwyssig (national team), Huggel, Cravero, Ceccaroni (all injured), Tchouga (before moving to Al-Jazeera), but for the first time with three U-17 test players Nicolas Maissen, Sehar Fejzulahi and Goran Antic. Substitute goalkeeper Miroslav König. For Basel Ergic in the second half on the right, Fejzulahi centrally. Maissen after his substitution central defender, Degen on the right, Barberis on the right. 43rd minute, Koumantarakis substituted out with a head injury. No cautions in a harmless game.

12 February 2002 Winter break	Basel (Switzerland)	3–2	(Switzerland) Thun	Stadion Rankhof, Basel
14:30	Koumantarakis 48' (1:0); Ergić 61' (2:1); Varela 81' (3:2)	FCB summary	54' (1:1) Matić; 76' (2:2) Raimondi; (yellow card) 86' Moser	Attendance: 400; Referee: (Switzerland) Claudio Circhetta (Muttenz)
Note: FCB without Zuberbühler, Zwyssig, Murat and Hakan Yakin (all with the national team in Cyprus), Ceccaroni, Cravero, Huggel, and Atouba (all injured), as well as Tchouga, whose loan move to Lausanne was finalized on the evening before. Thun without Haller (injured), and Stettler, Ferreira, Rufener, and Colatrella (all absent). 25th minute: Tum and Matic both left the game with head injuries following a collision between them.

19 February 2002 Winter break	Basel (Switzerland)	3–0	(Switzerland) Aarau	Rankhof Stadium, Basel
14:30	Tum 9' (2:0); H. Yakin 12' (2:0); Tum 51' (3:0)	FCB summary		Attendance: 300; Referee: (Switzerland) Claudio Circhetta (Muttenz)
Note: FCB without Murat Yakin (knee problems), Zwyssig (was ill on the day), Savic (infected by an ingrown toenail), Cravero (who resumed team training on the following Thursday), and Ceccaroni (still recovering from an injury). FCA without Gelson, Baldassari, Okpala, Joller, Tarone, and Friedli (all injured). 77th minute: a header from Atouba hit the crossbar. 80th minute: a shot from De Napoli hit the post. FCB with tactical changes from the 46th minute, they then played in a classic 4-4-2 formation: Blunschi at center-back, Degen on the right, Varela in the right-side of midfield and Ergic in central midfield. Then from the 63rd minute, Hasler played at left-back, Atouba on the left wing, Varela in the center and N'Tiamoah on the right. FCA responded by switching from man-to-man to zonal marking, which clearly confused the FCB team, right up until the end of the match.

=== Nationalliga A 2001–02 ===
==== Qualification round ====
The Qualification Round to the League season 2001–02 was contested by twelve teams. The first eight teams of the regular season (or Qualification) were then to compete in the Championship Playoff Round. The teams in ninth to twelfth position completed with the top four teams of the Nationalliga B in a Nationalliga A/B Playoff round. The first stage of the NLA began on Wednesday 4 July 2001 and was completed on Sunday 9 December.

4 July 2001 Round 1	Sion	8–1	Basel	Tourbillon, Sion
19:30	Moreira 6' (1:0); Duruz 29' (2:0); Marazzi (yellow card) 52'; Poueys 55' (3:1); Poueys 59' (4:1); Poueys 62' (5:1); Ojong 79' (6:1); Ojong 81' (7:1); Ojong 86' (8:1)	FCB summary	(yellow card) 12' Cravero; (yellow card) 34' (red card) 38' H. Yakin; 48' (2:1) Koumantarakis	Attendance: 6,250; Referee: (Switzerland) Carlo Bertolini (Vira-Gambarogno)
Note: Sion without Sirufo (suspended) as well as Furo, Luyet, and Kenedy (all injured). FCB without Savic and Cantaluppi (both injured) as well as Chipperfield (did not arrive in Switzerland until the weekend).

11 July 2001 Round 2	Basel	3–1	Servette	St. Jakob-Park, Basel
19:30	Tum 6' (1:0); Ergić 10' (2:0); Huggel 19' (3:0)	FCB summary	(yellow card) 53' Thurre; 90' (o.g. 3:1) (Streller)	Attendance: 17,844; Referee: (Liechtenstein) Roland Beck (Triesenberg)
Note: FCB without Hakan Yakin (suspended), Cantaluppi, Tchouga and Savic (all injured). Servette without Wolf (injured). Marco Streller made his NLA debut.

18 July 2001 Round 3	St. Gallen	3–3	Basel	Espenmoos, St. Gallen
19:30	Jefferson 10' (1:1); Gane (yellow card) 23'; Jairo (yellow card) 52'; Jairo 60' (2:3); Dal Santo 66' (3:3); Jefferson (yellow card) 86'	FCB summary	5' (0:1) Ergić; 15' (1:2) M. Yakin; (yellow card) 22' Ceccaroni; (yellow card) 35' Chipperfield; (yellow card) 42' Giménez; 57' (1:3) Kreuzer	Attendance: 11,300 (sold out); Referee: (Switzerland) Guido Wildhaber (Kerzers)
Note: St. Gallen without Walker, Nixon, and Imhof (all injured). FCB without Cantaluppi and Savic (both injured) and Hakan Yakin (suspended). 17th minute: Tato left the pitch with a suspected cruciate ligament tear and taken to hospital. 58th minute: a shot from Koumantarakis hit the post. 80th minute: a headed goal from Koumantarakis sas disallowed for offside.

21 July 2001 Round 4	Basel	P–P	Lausanne Sports	St. Jakob-Park, Basel
		[ (Report)]

28 July 2001 Round 5	Zürich	2–0	Basel	Letzigrund, Zürich
17:15	Kavelashvili 31' (1:0) (Quennoz) 83' (o.g. 2:0)	FCB summary FCZ summary	(yellow card) 45' Varela; (yellow card) 80' M. Yakin	Attendance: 12,500; Referee: (Switzerland) Florian Etter
Note: FCZ without Opango, Renato, Oenen, Jeanneret, and Quentin (all injured), as well as Guerrero and Keita (both lacking match permits). FCB without Hakan Yakin (suspended), Koumantarakis, and Savic (both injured). 57th minute: a shot from Pallas hit the post. 58th minute: Kreuzer cleared a shot from Kawelashvili off the line. 76th minute: a header from Tum hit the post with. 89th minute: Zuberbühler pushed a shot from Giannini onto the post.

4 August 2001 Round 6	Xamax	1–0	Basel	Stade de la Maladière, Neuchâtel
19:30	Arifović 36' (1:0); Simo (yellow card) 44'	FCB summary	(yellow card) 11' Atouba; (yellow card) 49' Chipperfield; (yellow card) 55' (yellow-red card) 76' M. Yakin	Attendance: 7,600; Referee: (Switzerland) Urs Meier (Wettingen and Würenlos)
Note: Xamax without Bättig and Roque (both injured). FCB without Koumantarakis, Knez, and Savic (all injured) as well as Hakan Yakin (suspended).

11 August 2001 Round 7	Basel	3–1	Young Boys	St. Jakob-Park, Basel
17:15	Varela (yellow card) 8'; Chipperfield 15' (1:0); Giménez 31' (2:0); Ergić 37' (3:0); Huggel (yellow card) 84'	FCB summary	(yellow card) 50' Berisha; 72' (3:1) Hänzi	Attendance: 24,831; Referee: (Switzerland) Martin Salm
Note: FCB without Ceccaroni, Koumantarakis, Savic, and Cantaluppi (all injured), as well as Hakan and Murat Yakin (both suspended). YB without Bochud, Disler, and Nzati (injured).

18 August 2001 Round 8	Aarau	1–1	Basel	Stadion Brügglifeld, Aarau
17:15	Joller (yellow card) 15'; Okpala 55' (1:0)	FCB summary FCA summary	(yellow card) 11' Cravero; 69' (1:1) Kreuzer; (yellow card) 76' Chipperfield	Attendance: 7,000; Referee: (Switzerland) Massimo Busacca (Monte Carasso/Bellinzona)
Note: FCB without Ceccaroni, Savic, Cantaluppi, and Ergic (all injured). FCA without Fiechter, Baldassarri, Previtali, De Napoli, Wojciechowski, and Page (all injured), as well as Tarone (suspended) and Khomeriki (absent).

25 August 2001 Round 9	Basel	5–1	Lugano	St. Jakob-Park, Basel
19:30	Koumantarakis 11' (1:1); Giménez 13' (2:1); Giménez 52' (3:1); M. Yakin (yellow card) 63'; H. Yakin 68' (4:1); Giménez 89' (5:1)	FCB summary	4' (0:1) Joël Magnin; (yellow card) 11' Ludovic Magnin; (yellow card) 74' Bullo	Attendance: 19,110; Referee: (Switzerland) Markus Nobs (Wohlen bei Bern)
Note: FCB without Savic, Cravero, Cantaluppi, Ceccaroni, and Kreuzer (all injured). Lugano without Kaba, Da Silva (not yet eligible to play), Sutter, Darbellay, Shala and Grubesic (all injured).

8 September 2001 Round 10	Grasshopper Club	1–0	Basel	Hardturm, Zürich
16:45	Núñez 33' (1:0); Benjani Mwaruwari	FCB summary	(yellow card) 23' M. Yakin; (yellow card) 45' Giménez; (yellow card) 73' Koumantarakis	Attendance: 8,200; Referee: (Liechtenstein) Roland Beck (Triesenberg)
Note: GC without Denicolà and Baturina (both injured). FCB without Ceccaroni, Cantaluppi, and Savic (all injured). 11th minute: a shot from Huggel grazed the outside of the post. 82nd minute: a headed goal from Gimenez was disallowed for offside—correctly so. 93rd minute: a headed goal from Tchouga was disallowed due to Hakan Yakin being offside—correctly so.

12 September 2001 Round 4	Basel	P–P	Lausanne Sports	St. Jakob-Park, Basel
		[ FCB summary]
Note: Out of respect for the tragic events in the United States, UEFA cancelled all matches in European competitions scheduled for this week. Consequently, the Swiss Football Association and the National League decided to follow UEFA's lead and canceled that evening's rescheduled match between FC Basel and FC Lausanne-Sports. A new date for the match has not yet been set.

16 September 2001 Round 11	Basel	4–1	Luzern	St. Jakob-Park, Basel
16:30	Giménez 45' (1:0); Chipperfield 62' (2:0); Giménez 71' (3:0); Koumantarakis 90+1' (4:1)	FCB summary	(yellow card) 21' Gian; (yellow card) 27' Hodel; (yellow card) 50' Wiederkehr; 82' (3:1) Varela	Attendance: 20,691; Referee: (Switzerland) Urs Meier (Wettingen and Würenlos)
Note: FCB without Ceccaroni (who played in a cup match in Grenchen with Basel's reserves), as well as Cantaluppi (recovering) and Savic (injured). FCL without Lengen, Belaic, Clemente, Hofer, Enrique, Rey, and Pinnelli (all injured). 34th minute: a shot from FCL's Ricardo Varela hit the crossbar.

22 September 2001 Round 12	Basel	2–1	Sion	St. Jakob-Park, Basel
19:30	Giménez 44' (1:0); Duruz (yellow card) 70'; M. Yakin (yellow card) 75'; Varela (yellow card) 80' (Tcheutchoua) 89' (o.g. 2:1)	FCB summary	(yellow card) 21' Vernaz; (yellow card) 56' Poueys; (yellow card) 45' (yellow-red card) 59' Deumi; 65' (1:1) Poueys; (yellow card) 75' Moreira; (yellow card) 86' Hottiger	Attendance: 19,258; Referee: (Switzerland) René Rogalla (Wallisellen)
Note: FCB without Savic and Cantaluppi (injured), as well as without Degen and Herzog (U-20). Sion without Furo and Kenedy (injured).

26 September 2001 Round 4	Basel	3–1	Lausanne Sports	St. Jakob-Park, Basel
19:30	Giménez 4' (1:0); H. Yakin 29' (2:0); Giménez (yellow card) 58' (X. Margairaz) 66' (o.g. 3:1); Kreuzer (penalty missed) 84′	FCB summary	(yellow card) 9' X. Margairaz; 42' (2:1) Chaveriat; (yellow card) 67' Gobet; (yellow card) 74' S. Margairaz; (yellow card) 74' Karlen	Attendance: 18,235; Referee: (Switzerland) Guido Wildhaber (Kerzers)
Note: FCB without Murat Yakin (suspended) as well as Ceccaroni and Savic (both injured). Lausanne without Thiaw and Lombardo (both suspended) as well as Meyer, Puce, Lutsenko, and Wittl (all injured). 84th minute: Kreuzer hit the crossbar with the penalty kick awarded for a foul.

1 October 2001 Round 13	Servette	1–4	Basel	Charmilles Stadium, Geneva
19:30	Fournier (yellow card) 17'; Oruma (yellow card) 18'; Dill 90+3' (1:4)	FCB summary	12' (0:1) Giménez; 42' (0:2) Chipperfield; 46' (0:3) H. Yakin; (yellow card) 70' Cantaluppi; 71' (0:4) Giménez	Attendance: 6,878; Referee: (Switzerland) Reto Rutz (Amriswil)
Note: Servette without Hilton, Thurre, Sanou and Bratic (all injured). FCB without Ceccaroni, Huggel and Koumantarakis.

10 October 2001 Round 14	Basel	2–2	St. Gallen	St. Jakob-Park, Basel
19:30	H. Yakin 4' (1:0); Barberis (yellow card) 50'; M. Yakin 96' (2:2)	FCB summary	(yellow card) 34' Guido; 61' (1:1) Gane; (yellow card) 87' Gane; 90+2' (1:2) Gane; (yellow card) 64' (yellow-red card) 90+6' Winkler	Attendance: 31,124; Referee: (Switzerland) Philippe Leuba (Chexbres)
Note: FCB without Ceccaroni, Cantaluppi, Koumantarakis, and Savic (all injured). St. Gallen without Imhof, Tato, and substitute goalkeeper Agosti (all injured). Hakan Yakin in midfield from the 76th minute. Referee escorted off the pitch under police protection.

14 October 2001 Round 15	Lausanne Sports	2–4	Basel	Olympique de la Pontaise, Lausanne
16:15	Zambaz (yellow card) 10'; Chaveriat 12' (1:1); Simon 21' (2:1); Lombardo (penalty missed) 32′	FCB summary	11' (pen. 0:1) Kreuzer; 31' (2:2) Giménez; 34' (2:3) H. Yakin; (yellow card) 37' Varela; 47' (2:4) Giménez; (yellow card) 53' Kreuzer	Attendance: 2,450; Referee: (Switzerland) Carlo Bertolini (Vira-Gambarogno)
Note: Lausanne without Thiaw and Lutsenko (both suspended) as well as Puce, Meyer, and Meoli (all injured). Basel without Cantaluppi, Ceccaroni, Koumantarakis, Savic, and Murat Yakin (all injured). NLA debut for Aurelio Teixeira. 32nd minute: Lombardo hit the outside of the post with the penalty kick. 33rd minute: a shot from Hakan Yakin hit the post.

20 October 2001 Round 16	Basel	2–1	Zürich	St. Jakob-Park, Basel
16:45	H. Yakin 51' (1:1); Ergić 59' (2:1); Huggel (yellow card) 88'	FCB summary FCZ summary	37' (0:1) Guerrero; (yellow card) 39' Fischer; (yellow card) 65' Heldmann; (yellow card) 81' Keita	Attendance: 28,481; Referee: (Switzerland) Urs Meier (Wettingen and Würenlos)
Note: FCB without Varela (suspended) and Ceccaroni, Tum and Savic (all injured). FCZ without Chassot and Kawelaschwili (both suspended) and Chihab, Jeanneret and Renato (all injured). NLA debut for Keita.

27 October 2001 Round 17	Basel	5–1	Xamax	St. Jakob-Park, Basel
19:30	Giménez 10' (1:0); Barberis (yellow card) 15'; Giménez 34' (2:0); Huggel (yellow card) 30'; Chipperfield 46' (3:0); Kreuzer (penalty missed) 68′ Giménez 68' (4:0); Giménez 80' (5:1)	FCB summary	73' (4:1) Alex	Attendance: 21,763; Referee: (Switzerland) Massimo Busacca (Monte Carasso/Bellinzona)
Note: FCB without Ceccaroni, Savic, and Murat Yakin (all injured). Xamax without Mangane and David Geijo (both injured). 68th minute: Kreuzer hit the crossbar with the penalty kick, the ball bounced back into play and Gimenez capitalises to make it 4–0.

3 November 2001 Round 18	Young Boys	2–2	Basel	Stadion Neufeld, Bern
16:45	Malacarne 9' (1:0); Tikva 20' (2:0); Malacarne (yellow card) 55'	FCB summary	(yellow card) 6' Chipperfield; 33' (2:1) Giménez; (red card) 58' H. Yakin; 77' (2:2) Varela; (yellow card) 86' Varela	Attendance: 10,600 (sold out); Referee: (Switzerland) Nicole Petignat (Courgenay)
Note: The Stadion Neufeld was the tempory home ground for BSC YB between the years 2001 and 2005, following the demolishen of the old Wankdorf Stadium and while the new Stadion Wankdorf was being constructed. YB without Bochud, Fryand, and Mitreski (all injured). FCB without Ceccaroni, Huggel, and Savic (all injured).

17 November 2001 Round 19	Basel	1–0	Aarau	St. Jakob-Park, Basel
16:45	Cravero (yellow card) 14'; Koumantarakis 51' (1:0); Varela (yellow card) 59'	FCB summary FCA summary	(yellow card) 35' de Napoli	Attendance: 22,573; Referee: (Switzerland) Reto Rutz (Amriswil)
Note: FCB without Chipperfield (suspended), Cantaluppi, Ceccaroni, Huggel, and Savic (all injured). Hakan Yakin eligible to play due to the postponement of the National League appeal hearing. FCA without Previtali, Wojciechowski, and Schenker (all injured). 7th minute: a shot from de Napoli hit the crossbar.

25 November 2001 Round 20	Lugano	1–2	Basel	Stadio Cornaredo, Lugano
14:30	Rothenbühler 90+1' (1:2)	FCB summary	13' (0:1) Koumantarakis; (yellow card) 20' Aziawonou; (yellow card) 43' Cravero; (yellow card) 26' (yellow-red card) 82' Koumantarakis; 84' (0:2) H. Yakin	Attendance: 6,600; Referee: (Switzerland) Philippe Leuba (Chexbres)
Note: Lugano without Ludovic Magnin (suspended), Bullo, Lubamba, and Darbellay (all injured). FCB without Varela, Cantaluppi, Huggel, Ceccaroni, and Savic (all injured), as well as Tchouga (Basel U-20 youth team).

2 December 2001 Round 21	Basel	4–5	Grasshopper Club	St. Jakob-Park, Basel
14:30	H. Yakin 8' (1:0); Giménez 40' (2:3); Varela (yellow card) 65'; Giménez 74' (3:5); Varela 80' (4:5)	FCB summary	12' (1:1) Diop; (yellow card) 14' Diop; 15' (1:2) Cabanas; 39' (1:3) Núñez; 50' (2:4) Núñez; (yellow card) 65' Núñez; 65' (2:5) Cabanas	Attendance: 33,433 (sold out); Referee: (Liechtenstein) Roland Beck (Triesenberg)
Note: FCB without Koumantarakis and Cravero (both suspended), and Ceccaroni, Cantaluppi, Huggel, and Savic (all injured). GC without Tararache (suspended), and Berner, Denicolà, and Petric (all injured). 15th minute: Nuñez’s shot deflected against the post by Zuberbühler; Cabanas scores on the rebound. 52nd minute: a goal from Hakan Yakin was disallowed (foul by Murat Yakin on Jehle).

9 December 2001 Round 22	Luzern	0–1	Basel	Stadion Allmend, Luzern
14:30	Blunschi (yellow card) 47'; Pinelli (yellow card) 53'; Enrique (yellow card) 64'; Meier (yellow card) 84'	FCB summary	(yellow card) 32' M. Yakin; (yellow card) 57' Varela; (yellow card) 64' Koumantarakis; 86' (0:1) Tum	Attendance: 7,509; Referee: (Switzerland) Nicole Petignat (Courgenay)
Note: FCL without Ricardo Varela, Wiederkehr, Zukic, Monteiro, and Rey (all injured) and Koch (suspended). FCB without Ceccaroni, Huggel, Savic, and Cantaluppi (all injured) as well as Tchouga (surplus foreign player).

==== League table qualification ====
Pos	Team	Pld	W	D	L	GF	GA	GD	Pts	Qualification
1	Basel	22	13	4	5	52	37	+15	43	Advance to championship round halved points (rounded up) as bonus
2	Lugano	22	11	5	6	39	33	+6	38	Advance to championship round halved points (rounded up) as bonus
3	Grasshopper Club	22	11	4	7	50	33	+17	37	Advance to championship round halved points (rounded up) as bonus
4	St. Gallen	22	9	8	5	38	32	+6	35	Advance to championship round halved points (rounded up) as bonus
5	Servette	22	9	7	6	36	29	+7	34	Advance to championship round halved points (rounded up) as bonus
6	Sion	22	10	3	9	40	29	+11	33	Advance to championship round halved points (rounded up) as bonus
7	Young Boys	22	8	7	7	35	28	+7	31	Advance to championship round halved points (rounded up) as bonus
8	Zürich	22	7	9	6	24	27	−3	30	Advance to championship round halved points (rounded up) as bonus
9	Aarau	22	7	6	9	28	25	+3	27	Continue to promotion/relegation round
10	Xamax	22	6	7	9	28	36	−8	25	Continue to promotion/relegation round
11	Lausanne-Sport	22	4	4	14	24	49	−25	16	Continue to promotion/relegation round
12	Luzern	22	3	4	15	23	59	−36	13	Continue to promotion/relegation round

Source: RSSSF

==== Championship Playoff Round ====
The first eight teams of the regular season (or Qualification) competed in the Championship Playoff Round. They took half of the points (rounded up to complete units) gained in the Qualification as Bonus with them. The Championship round began on 24 February 2002 and was completed on 8 May.

24 February 2002 Round 1	Lugano	2–5	Basel	Stadio Cornaredo, Lugano
14:30	Sutter 4' (1:0); Gaspoz (yellow card) 38' (yellow-red card) 68'; Rota (red card) 70'; Rossi 70' (2:3)	FCB summary	(yellow card) 3' Zwyssig; (yellow card) 9' Chipperfield; 43' (1:1) M. Yakin; 44' (1:2) Koumantarakis; 68' (1:3) H. Yakin; 71' (2:4) Giménez; 73' (2:5) Giménez	Attendance: 6,700; Referee: (Switzerland) Guido Wildhaber (Kerzers)
Note: Lugano without Cepeda and Darbellay (both injured) and Grubesic (not in the squad). FCB without Ceccaroni, Cravero, and Huggel (all injured) and Varela (suspended). 47th minute: a shot from Hakan Yakin hit the crossbar.

2 March 2002 Round 2	Basel	1–0	Zürich	St. Jakob-Park, Basel
16:45	Koumantarakis 61' (1:0); Quennoz (yellow card) 78'; H. Yakin (yellow card) 79'	FCB summary FCZ summary	(yellow card) 9' Keller; (yellow card) 27' Burki; (yellow card) 31' Hellinga; (yellow card) 55' Guerrero	Attendance: 25,871; Referee: (Switzerland) Massimo Busacca (Monte Carasso/Bellinzona)
Note: FCB without Varela (suspended), Huggel and Ceccaroni (both injured). FCZ without Magro and Iodice (both suspended), Kawelashvili, Gygax, Milicevic and Oenen (all injured), Jamarauli and Bühlmann (not in the squad). Tactical change by FCB, Hakan Yakin in attack following Gimenez's substitution and Quennoz replaced Barberis in defense.

6 March 2002 Round 3	St. Gallen	P–P	Basel	Espenmoos, St. Gallen
		[ FCB summery]		Referee: (Switzerland) Carlo Bertolini (Vira-Gambarogno)
Note: Postponed and rescheduled.

9 March 2002 Round 4	Basel	2–0	Young Boys	St. Jakob-Park, Basel
19:30	Giménez 36' (1:0); Cantaluppi 45+1' (2:0); Savić (yellow card) 81'; Koumantarakis (yellow card) 81'	FCB summary	(yellow card) 84' Vonlanthen	Attendance: 30,521; Referee: (Switzerland) Philippe Leuba (Chexbres)
Note: FCB without Hakan Yakin (suspended), Ceccaroni, Ergic and Huggel. Young Boys without Malacarne, Disler, Berisha, Coubagéat, Nzati, Rotanzi and Eugster (all injured). 23rd minute, Zwyssig taken out of the match with a suspected hamstring strain. 50th mimute, a header from Murat Yakin hit the top of the crossbar. 59th minute Varela substituted out with a suspected hamstring strain.

16 March 2002 Round 5	Basel	4–0	Sion	St. Jakob-Park, Basel
19:30	H. Yakin 17' (1:0); H. Yakin 35' (2:0); Chipperfield (yellow card) 45' (goal) 60' (3:0); Ergić 74' (4:0)	FCB summary	(yellow card) 19' Moreira; (red card) 20' Roussey (Head-coach, not on pitch); (yellow card) 21' (yellow-red card) 22' Hottiger; (yellow card) 21' Grichting; (yellow card) 39' M'Futi; (yellow card) 59' Piffaretti	Attendance: 24,407; Referee: (Austria) Stefan Messner
Note: This match was played as part of the interaction referee exchange between the Swiss Football Association and the Austrian Football Association. FCB without Ceccaroni, Huggel and Cravero (all three injured). Sion without Tcheutchoua and Ekobo (both suspended). 5th minute, a goal by Gimenez was disallowed for offside. 20th minute: Sion coach Laurent Roussey sent off (dissent). Tactical change by Sion in the 21st minute, Duruz moved to central defense following Hottiger's sending-off. 42nd minute, a goal by Koumantarakis was disallowed for offside. 46th minute: Marazzi took up a central midfield role after coming on, Bridy moved to the left and Piffaretti to the right. 54th minute, a header from Zwyssig hit the crossbar. 78th minute tactical change by FCB, Savic played in left midfield after coming on, Chipperfield shifted to a central position behind the strikers. Last match played on the old pitch (just one year old) in the St. Jakob-Park.

24 March 2002 Round 6	Grasshopper Club	1–0	Basel	Hardturm, Zürich
16:15	Eduardo (yellow card) 8'; Núñez 69' (1:0); Baturina (yellow card) 75'; Jaggy (yellow card) 77'; Hodel (yellow card) 86'	FCB summary	(yellow card) 55' Koumantarakis; (yellow card) 65' Quennoz	Attendance: 15,500; Referee: (Switzerland) Massimo Busacca (Monte Carasso/Bellinzona)
Note: GC without Spycher (suspended), Castillo, Ippoliti, and Huber (all injured). FCB without Ceccaroni, Ergic, and Huggel (all injured).

1 April 2002 Round 7	Servette	1–2	Basel	Charmilles Stadium, Geneva
14:00	Comisetti (yellow card) 3'; Fournier 41'; Fournier (yellow card) 14' (yellow-red card) 43'; Lonfat (yellow card) 70'	FCB summary	14' (pen. 0:1) M. Yakin; 20' (0:2) Atouba; (yellow card) 28' (yellow-red card) 60' Yao	Attendance: 6,150; Referee: (Switzerland) Urs Meier (Wettingen and Würenlos)
Note: Servette without Thurre, Bratic, Obradovic, Reina, Sanou, and Hilton (all injured), but with Lombardo (appeal against match suspensions pending). FCB without Huggel, Cantaluppi, and Ceccaroni (all injured).

4 April 2002 Round 3	St. Gallen	1–3	Basel	Espenmoos, St. Gallen
19:30	Di Jorio (yellow card) 40'; Di Jorio 44' (1:0)	FCB summary	54' (1:1) M. Yakin; 56' (1:2) M. Yakin; (yellow card) 60' Chipperfield; 70' (1:3) Zwyssig	Attendance: 11,300; Referee: (Switzerland) Carlo Bertolini (Vira-Gambarogno)
Note: St. Gallen without Tato (injured), Nixon, Oberli and Jefferson (not in the squad). Alex played his NLA debut. 50th minute Winkler was substituted out and referred to hospital after a blow to the back and blood in his airways. FCB without Ceccaroni and Huggel (both injured) and Aziawonou (suspended).

7 April 2002 Round 8	Basel	3–2	Servette	St. Jakob-Park, Basel
16:15	Barberis (yellow card) 13'; Ergić 45' (1:1); Giménez 58' (2:2) (Hilton) 88' (o.g. 3:2); H. Yakin (red card) 90+2'	FCB summary	(yellow card) 9' Miéville; 39' (0:1) A. Frei; 47' (1:2) Hilton; (yellow card) 83' Jaquet; (yellow card) 90+2' Oruma	Attendance: 26,001; Referee: (Switzerland) Reto Rutz (Amriswil)
Note: FCB without Ceccaroni and Huggel (both recovering from injury). Servette without Fournier (suspended), Bah, Bratic, Thurre, and Salou (all injured). 43rd minute: a shot from Chipperfield hit the post.

14 April 2002 Round 9	Basel	4–1	Grasshoppers	St. Jakob-Park, Basel
16:00	H. Yakin 1' (1:0); Giménez 47' (2:1); Tum (yellow card) 84'; M. Yakin (yellow card) 84'; M. Yakin 87' (3:1); Ergić 89' (4:1)	FCB summary	15' (1:1) Hodel; (yellow card) 56' Cabanas	Attendance: 33,433 (sold out); Referee: (Switzerland) Markus Nobs (Wohlen bei Bern)
Note: FCB without Cravero (suspended), Barberis, Cantaluppi, Ceccaroni, and Huggel (the latter two injured). GC without Castillo (ill), Ippoliti, and Huber (all injured). 1st minute: a shot from Chipperfield hit the post, Hakan Yakin then converted a loose ball. 65th minute tactical change by FCB, Hakan Yakin moved to the attack following Varela being substituted in. 86th minute: a shot from Tum hit the outside of the post.

20 April 2002 Round 10	Sion	0–3	Basel	Tourbillon, Sion
16:45	Duruz (yellow card) 24'; Beney (red card) 29'; Tcheutchoua (yellow card) 34'	FCB summary	3' (0:1) Koumantarakis; 17' (0:2) Giménez; 41' (0:3) Koumantarakis; (yellow card) 69' Quennoz	Attendance: 4,200; Referee: (Switzerland) Martin Salm
Note: Sion without Vernaz (injured). FCB without Cantaluppi, Huggel, and Barberis (all injured), as well as Ceccaroni (who made his injury comeback with the reserves). 29th minute, Sion goalkeeper Nicolas Beney was sent of for a tactical foul outside of the penalty area. 70th minute: Basel goalkeeper Zuberbühler tipped the direct free-kick from Moreira onto the crossbar.

24 April 2002 Round 11	Young Boys	0–3	Basel	Stadion Neufeld, Bern
19:00	Berisha (yellow card) 54'	FCB summary	11' (o.g. 0:1) (Berisha); 14' (0:2) Tum; 77' (0:3) Koumantarakis	Attendance: 11,600 (sold out); Referee: (Switzerland) Carlo Bertolini (Vira-Gambarogno)
Note: The Stadion Neufeld was the tempory home ground for BSC YB between the years 2001 and 2005, following the demolishen of the old Wankdorf Stadium and while the new Stadion Wankdorf was being constructed. YB without Petrosjan and Rochat (both suspended) and Patrick, Malacarne, Fryand, Disler, Coubagéat and Rotanzi (all injured). FCB without Hakan Yakin (suspended) and Gimenez, Huggel and Ceccaroni (all injured). Following the win of threse three points, FCB were mathematically champions and could no longer be caught in the table by any other club.

27 April 2002 Round 12	Basel	1–2	St. Gallen	St. Jakob-Park, Basel
16:45	Chipperfield 12' (1:1); Varela (yellow card) 78'; Zanni (yellow card) 80'	FCB summary	(yellow card) 2' Jairo; 6' (0:1) Alex; 71' (1:2) Gane; (yellow card) 80' Chaile	Attendance: 33,433 (sold out); Referee: (Switzerland) Urs Meier (Wettingen and Würenlos)
Note: FCB without Hakan Yakin (suspended), Gimenez and Huggel (both injured). Massimo Ceccaroni made his comeback following his injury. St. Gallen without Mokoena, Jefferson, Oberli and Tato (all injured). 11th minute a shot from Tum bounced off the post.

4 May 2002 Round 13	Zürich	3–1	Basel	Letzigrund, Zürich
18:00	Kavelashvili 9' (1:0); Keller (yellow card) 26'; Pallas (yellow card) 32'; Kavelashvili (yellow card) 54'; Akalé 82' (2:1); Magro (yellow card) 83'; Keita 84' (3:1); Gygax (red card) 87'	FCB summary FCZ summary	(yellow card) 19' Cantaluppi; 33' (1:1) Barberis; (yellow card) 55'Savić	Attendance: 8,200; Referee: (Switzerland) Dieter Schoch (Attiswil)
Note: FCZ without Guerrero, Hellinga, Jeanneret, Milicevic and Renato (all injured). FCB without Gimenez, Chipperfield and Huggel (all injured). 46th minute: a shot by Hakan Yakin hit the angle of the crossbar and post.

8 May 2002 Round 14	Basel	4–3	Lugano	St. Jakob-Park, Basel
20:15	Giménez 7' (1:0); Cantaluppi 23' (2:1); Ergić 79' (3:3); Tum 85' (4:3)	FCB summary	21' (1:1) Magnin; 48' (2:2) Magnin; (yellow card) 55' Morf; (yellow card) 62' Gaspoz; 71' (2:3) Rossi; (yellow card) 75' Rothenbühler	Attendance: 33,433 (sold out); Referee: (Switzerland) Nicole Petignat
Note: FCB without Huggel (injured) and Koumantarakis (South Africa national team). Murat Yakin (mildly ill with a cold) came on as a substitute only after an hour of play. Lugano without Zagorcic (injured). 17th minute, a goal by Joël Magnin was disallowed for an offside. After the match, National League president Jean-François Kurz presented the championship trophy to FCB captain Murat Yakin.

==== Final league table ====
The first eight teams of the regular season (or Qualification) competed in the Championship Playoff Round. They took half of the points (rounded up to complete units) gained in the Qualification as Bonus with them. This phase began on the 24 February 20021 and was completed on 8 May.

Pos	Team	Pld	W	D	L	GF	GA	GD	BP	Pts	Qualification or relegation
1	Basel	14	11	0	3	36	16	+20	22	55	Swiss champions and Cup winners qualified for Champions League third qualifying round
2	Grasshopper Club	14	7	5	2	28	17	+11	19	45	qualified for UEFA Cup first round
3	Lugano (Note: Both Lugano and Sion did not obtain a 1st level license for the 2002/03 season. Nor die Lausanne; all three clubs are relegated to the NL B and their NL A places filled by Aarau, Delémont and Luzern.) (R)	14	7	2	5	23	19	+4	19	42	qualified for UEFA Cup qualifying round
4	Servette	14	6	3	5	25	23	+2	17	38	qualified for UEFA Cup qualifying round
5	Zürich	14	6	2	6	14	17	−3	15	35	entered Intertoto Cup first round
6	St. Gallen	14	4	4	6	18	20	−2	18	34	entered Intertoto Cup first round
7	Young Boys	14	4	3	7	18	25	−7	16	31	
8	Sion (R)	14	1	1	12	10	35	−25	17	21	

Source: RSSSF
(R) Relegated

=== Swiss Cup ===
This season's Swiss Cup was the 77th season of Switzerland's cup competition held annually by the Swiss Football Association (SFV-ASF). The competition began on 10 August with the first games of Round 1 and ended on 12 May 2002 with the Final held at St. Jakob-Park, Basel. The cup winners were qualified for the first round of the UEFA Cup. The twelve first-tier clubs from the 2001–02 Nationalliga A had been granted byes for the first four rounds and they joined the competition in the fifth round. Here they were seeded and cound not be drawn against each other. The draw respected regionalities, when possible, and the lower classed team was granted home advantage.

10 November 2001 Round 5	Concordia	0–5	Basel	St. Jakob-Park, Basel
19:30	Ribeiro (yellow card) 45'	FCB summary	(yellow card) 25' Quennoz; 27' (0:1) Barberis; 41' (0:2) Koumantarakis; 59' (0:3) Giménez; 75' (0:4) Tum; 90+1' (0:5) Tum	Attendance: 5,431; Referee: (Switzerland) Claudio Circhetta (Muttenz)
Note: FCB without Hakan Yakin (suspended), Ergic (ill, toothache), Ceccaroni, Huggel, Savic and Murat Yakin (all injured). 52nd minute: Cantaluppi left the game with a knee injury.

17 February 2002 Round 6	Colombier	0–1	Basel	Stade des Chézards, Colombier, Switzerland
14:30		FCB summary	(yellow card) 53' H. Yakin; 56' (0:1) Giménez; (yellow card) 59' Giménez	Attendance: 3,000; Referee: (Switzerland) Florian Etter
Note: Colombier without Javier Saiz (suspended). FCB without Atouba (suspended), Ceccaroni, Cravero (both injured), and Huggel (was ill). Corners: 3–14 (1–10).

21 March 2002 Quarter-final	Zürich	1–4	Basel	Letzigrund, Zürich
19:30	Akalé 24' (1:1); Iodice (yellow card) 45'; Chassot (yellow card) 47'; Akalé (yellow card) 36' (yellow-red card) 88'	FCB summary FCZ summary	17' (0:1) Koumantarakis; (yellow card) 24' Koumantarakis; 44' (1:2) Ergić; 84' (1:3) Varela; 87' (1:4) Chipperfield	Attendance: 6,800; Referee: (Switzerland) Guido Wildhaber (Kerzers)
Note: FCZ without Guerrero, Gygax, Milicevic, and Oenen (all injured). FCB without Cravero, Ceccaroni, and Huggel (all injured). 87th minute: a shot from Tum hit the post, then Chipperfield converted the rebound.

11 April 2002 Semifinal	Basel	1–1 (a.e.t.) (4–3 p)	Young Boys	St. Jakob-Park, Basel
20:15	Varela (yellow card) 13'; M. Yakin (penalty missed) 16′ Giménez 23' (1:0); Yao (yellow card) 58'; Cravero (red card) 69'; Atouba (yellow card) 90'; Koumantarakis (yellow card) 114'	FCB summary	(yellow card) 16' Rochat; (penalty missed) 30′ Sermeter; 51' (1:1) Descloux; (red card) 73' Collaviti; (yellow card) 77' Tikva	Attendance: 25,381; Referee: (Switzerland) Massimo Busacca (Monte Carasso/Bellinzona)
	Penalties
	M. Yakin (penalty scored); Zwyssig (penalty scored); Giménez (penalty scored); Koumantarakis (penalty missed); Zuberbühler (penalty missed); Chipperfield (penalty scored)		(penalty scored) Hänzi; (penalty missed) Tikva; (penalty scored) Descloux; (penalty missed) Petrosyan; (penalty scored) Burri; (penalty missed) Berisha
Note: FCB without Hakan Yakin (suspended), Ceccaroni and Huggel (both injured). YB without Patrick, Fryand, Malacarne, Rotanzi, Disler and Coubagéat. 16th minute: Murat Yakin hit the post with the penalty kick. 30th minute, FCB goalkeeper Zuberbühler saved the penalty kick from Sermeter. 49th minute, a shot from Varela hit the crossbar. 97th minute: Tikva hit the top of the crossbar with a shot.

12 May 2002 Final	Grasshopper Club	1–2 (a.e.t.)	Basel	St. Jakob-Park, Basel
16:00	Petrić 38'; Schwegler (yellow card) 28'; Castillo (yellow card) 78'; Cabanas (yellow card) 82'; Petrić (yellow card) 91'; Smiljanić (yellow card) 42' (yellow-red card) 112'	Fussball-Schweiz summary FCB summary	5' Tum; (yellow card) 43' M. Yakin; (yellow card) 114' Barberis; 113' (pen.) M. Yakin	Attendance: 30,000 (sold-out); Referee: (Switzerland) Philippe Leuba (Chexbres)
Note: GC without Ippoliti and Huber (both injured); Baturina, Jaggy, Jehle and Mikari on the bench. FCB without Huggel (injured) and Koumantarakis (suspended); Crevoisier, Ceccaroni, Cravero, Savic and Aziawonou on the bench. 43rd minute: a goal by Murat Yakin was disallowed (handball). 107th minute: Borer deflected a shot from Ergic onto the post. The Swiss U17 European Championship-winning team was honored before the match.

Basel won the cup and this was the club's sixth cup title to this date. Five days earlier the team had also become league champions and this was the second time in the club's history that they had secured the double. Since Basel won the championship and qualified for the 2002–03 UEFA Champions League, GC qualified for the first round of the UEFA Cup.

=== UEFA Intertoto Cup ===
==== Second round ====
1 July 2001 First leg	Basel (Switzerland)	3–0	(Iceland) Grindavík	St. Jakob-Park, Basel
15:00	Magro 4'; Tchouga 18'; Tum 60'; Magro (yellow card) 90+2'	FCB summary		Attendance: 6,843; Referee: Yuri Klyuchnikov (Russia)
Note: FCB without Koumantarakis, Cantaluppi and Huggel (all injured) and Murat Yakin (recovering from bronchitis). 4th minute: a header from Tchouga hit the crossbar, Magro converted from the rebound.

8 July 2001 Second leg	Grindavík (Iceland)	0–2 (0–5 agg.)	(Switzerland) Basel	Grindavíkurvöllur, Grindavík
16:00	Kekic (yellow card) 56'; Floventtson (yellow card) 75'	FCB summary	14' (0:1) Muff; (yellow card) 42' Aziawonou; 80' (0:2) Muff	Attendance: 700; Referee: Zbigniew Marczyk (Poland)
Note: FCB without Cantaluppi and Savic (both injured), Hakan Yakin (rested) and Chipperfield (who only arrived in Basel on Saturday).

Basel won 5–0 on aggregate.

==== Third round ====
14 July 2001 First leg	Basel (Switzerland)	2–1	(Netherlands) Heerenveen	St. Jakob-Park, Basel
19:30	Koumantarakis 12' (1:0); H. Yakin 20' (2:0); Cravero (yellow card) 33'	FCB summary	(yellow card) 21' van Gessel; (yellow card) 24' Lurling; 56' (2:1) Nurmela; (yellow card) 68' Hansma; (yellow card) 68' Vonk	Attendance: 8,059; Referee: José Mendes Pratas (Portugal)
Note: FCB without Cantaluppi, Savic and Varela (all injured) and Huggel (was ill). 9th minute, a shot from Tchouga hit the post.

21 July 2001 Second leg	Heerenveen (Netherlands)	2–3 (3–5 agg.)	(Switzerland) Basel	Abe Lenstra Stadion, Heerenveen
19:30	Allbäck 4' (1:0); Jensen (yellow card) 37'; Venena (yellow card) 54'; Lurling 75' (2:3)	FCB summary	10' (1:1) Koumantarakis; 24' (1:2) H. Yakin; (yellow card) 32' Kreuzer; (yellow card) 64' Zuberbühler; 69' (1:3) Tum	Attendance: 13,300; Referee: Stéphane Moulin (France)
Note: FCB without Savic, Cantaluppi and Murat Yakin (all injured) and Ergic (rested).

Basel won 5–3 on aggregate.

==== Semifinal ====
25 July 2001 First leg	Basel (Switzerland)	3–0	(Switzerland) Lausanne	St. Jakob-Park, Basel
19:30	Giménez 19' (1:0); Giménez 21' (2:0); M. Yakin (yellow card) 42'; H. Yakin 45' (3:0)	FCB summary	(yellow card) 42' Margairaz	Attendance: 14,872; Referee: Ferenc Bede (Hungary)
Note: FCB without Kreuzer and Savic (both injured) and Tchouga (not in the squad). Cantaluppi returned after his injury. Lausanne without Isaias (suspended), Puce, Karlen and Lutsenko (all injured), as well as Kuzba (not in the squad/considering a transfer).

1 August 2001 Second leg	Lausanne-Sport (Switzerland)	2–2 (2–5 agg.)	(Switzerland) Basel	Stade Olympique de la Pontaise, Lausanne
16:30	Thiaw 8' (1:0); Thiaw 45' (2:1); Thiaw (yellow card) 51' (red card) 54'	FCB summary	18' (1:1) Tum; 62' (2:2) Varela	Attendance: 2,050; Referee: Vasily Melnichuk (Ukraine)
Note: Lausanne without Karlen and Lutsenko (injured), Isaïas (suspended) and Meyer (rested). FCB without Koumantarakis, Knez, Savic and Murat Yakin (all injured).

Basel won 5–2 on aggregate.

==== Final ====
7 August 2001 First leg	Basel (Switzerland)	1–1	(England) Aston Villa	St. Jakob-Park, Basel
19:30	Giménez 74' (1:1)	FCB summary	58' (0:1) Merson; (yellow card) 76' Vassell; (yellow card) 77' Wright	Attendance: 25,879; Referee: Eric Romain (Belgium)
Note: FCB without Ceccaroni, Cravero, Koumantarakis and Savic (all injured). Aston Villa without their number one goalkeeper Peter Schmeichel (injured).

21 August 2001 Second leg	Aston Villa (England)	4–1 (5–2 agg.)	(Switzerland) Basel	Villa Park, Birmingham
19:45	Vassell 45' (1:1); Ángel 55' (2:1); Ángel 78' (3:1); Stone (yellow card) 81'; Ginola 84' (4:1)	FCB summary	30' (0:1) Chipperfield; (yellow card) 67' Varela	Attendance: 39,513; Referee: Claus Bo Larsen (Denmark)
Note: Aston Villa without Wright and Taylor (both injured) and Mellberg (ineligible for the Intertoto Cup). FCB without Ceccaroni, Cantaluppi, Ergic and Savic (all injured).

Aston Villa won 5–2 on aggregate and therefore as Intertoto Cup winners, advanced to the 2001–02 UEFA Cup

== See also ==
- History of FC Basel
- List of FC Basel players
- List of FC Basel seasons

== Sources ==
- Rotblau: Jahrbuch Saison 2015/2016. Publisher: FC Basel Marketing AG. ISBN 978-3-7245-2050-4
- Rotblau: Jahrbuch Saison 2017/2018. Publisher: FC Basel Marketing AG. ISBN 978-3-7245-2189-1
- Die ersten 125 Jahre / 2018. Publisher: Josef Zindel im Friedrich Reinhardt Verlag, Basel. ISBN 978-3-7245-2305-5
- 2001–02 at "Basler Fussballarchiv” homepage
- Switzerland 2001–02 at RSSSF
