= 2004–05 FC Thun season =

FC Thun
2004-05 season
- Manager: Urs Schönenberger
- Swiss Super League: 2nd
- Swiss Cup: Quarter-final
- UEFA Intertoto Cup: Third round
- Top goalscorer: League: Mauro Lustrinelli (20 goals); All: Mauro Lustrinelli (24 goals)

During the season, Thun competed in the Swiss Super League and the Swiss Cup.

== Season summary ==
FC Thun finished second in Swiss Super League.

Pos	Team	Pld	W	D	L	GF	GA	GD	Pts	Qualification or relegation
1	Basel (C)	34	21	7	6	81	45	+36	70	Qualification to Champions League third qualifying round
2	Thun	34	18	6	10	69	42	+27	60	Qualification to Champions League second qualifying round
3	Grasshopper	34	12	14	8	51	50	+1	50	Qualification to UEFA Cup second qualifying round
4	Young Boys	34	12	13	9	60	52	+8	49	Qualification to Intertoto Cup second round
5	Zürich	34	13	9	12	55	57	−2	48	Qualification to UEFA Cup second qualifying round (Note: via 2004–05 Swiss Cup)

Source: RSSSF
Rules for classification: 1) points; 2) goal difference; 3) number of goals scored.
(C) Champions

== Squad ==
- Fabio Coltorti
- Alain Portmann
- Pascal Cerrone
- Armand Deumi
- Sandro Galli
- Selver Hodzic
- Ljubo Miličević
- David Pallas
- Lukas Schenkel
- Sehid Sinani
- Silvan Aegerter
- Andres Gerber
- Baykal Kulaksizoglu
- Nelson Ferreira
- Mario Raimondi
- Michel Renggli
- Nenad Savić
- Fabian Stoller
- Gelson Rodrigues
- Mauro Lustrinelli
- Adrian Moser
- Samuel Ojong

== Swiss cup ==
=== Round 1 ===
Teams from Super League and Challenge League were seeded in this round. In a match, the home advantage was granted to the team from the lower league, if applicable.

Team 1	Score	Team 2
17 September 2004
FC Martigny-Sports	0–6	BSC Young Boys
FC Porrentruy	1–3	FC Concordia Basel
FC Schötz	1–4 (aet)	FC Baden
FC Kickers Luzern	1–4	FC Zürich
FC Signal	0–3	FC Meyrin
18 September 2004
FC Saint-Imier	2–5	FC La Chaux-de-Fonds
FC Epalinges	2–4	Yverdon-Sport FC
FC Collex-Bossy	0–3	FC Baulmes
FC Lausanne-Sport	1–2	Neuchâtel Xamax
FC Konolfingen	0–4	FC Sion
FC Biel-Bienne	0–2	FC Thun
FC Visp	0–1	FC Bex
FC Sierre	1–1 (aet, p. 2–4)	FC Massongex
FC Muri	2-2 (aet, p. 3–5)	FC Wohlen
FC Niedergösgen	0–9	FC Aarau
FC Oberdorf	0–4	FC Basel
FC Grenchen	1–3	SC Zofingen
FC Luterbach	2–1	FC Laufen
Inter Club Zurigo	0–7	Grasshopper Club Zürich
FC Küssnacht a/R	1–2	SC Young Fellows Juventus
SC Cham	2-4	SC Kriens
Zug 94	0–2	FC Luzern
FC Affoltern	1–5	FC Winterthur
FC Wolhusen	2–1	FC Uster
FC Bazenheid	0–1 (aet)	AC Lugano
FC Altstätten	1–4	AC Bellinzona
FC Goldach	0–3	FC Chiasso
SC Brühl	2–4	FC Schaffhausen
FC Herisau	2–1	FC Wil 1900
19 September 2004
US Arbedo	1–3	FC St. Gallen
FC Stade Nyonnais	1–2	Servette FC
ES Belfaux	1–4	FC Bulle

=== Round 2 ===
Team 1	Score	Team 2
22 October 2004
SC Kriens	3–4 (aet)	SC Young Fellows Juventus
23 October 2004
FC Luterbach	0–7	Neuchâtel Xamax FC
FC Massongex	0–8	FC Thun
FC Sion	4–2	Servette FC
FC Wohlen	0–1	BSC Young Boys
FC Baulmes	1–0	FC La Chaux-de-Fonds
AC Lugano	1–1 (aet, p. 8–9)	FC Aarau
FC Winterthur	1–3	FC Luzern
FC Wolhusen	1–3	FC Chiasso
24 October 2004
FC Meyrin	1–3	FC Basel
FC Bex	1–7	FC Concordia Basel
FC Bulle	0–4	Yverdon-Sport FC
SC Zofingen	1–5	FC Schaffhausen
FC Baden	1-5 (aet	FC St.Gallen
FC Herisau	2-7	FC Zürich
AC Bellinzona	2–2 (aet, p. 4–3)	Grasshopper Club Zürich

=== Round 3 ===
Team 1	Score	Team 2
20 November 2004
FC Baulmes	0–2	FC Aarau
FC Chiasso	1–0	Yverdon-Sport FC
FC Sion	1–2	BSC Young Boys
FC Thun	1–1 (aet, p. 4–3)	FC Basel
21 November 2004
SC Young Fellows Juventus	0–2	AC Bellinzona
FC Luzern	4–1	FC Concordia Basel
Neuchâtel Xamax FC	0–2	FC Zürich
FC Schaffhausen	2–2 (aet, p. 3–5)	FC St.Gallen

=== Quarterfinals ===
13 February 2005
14:30 CET

FC Chiasso	0 – 4	FC Luzern
		Vogt 37'; Tchouga 39' (pen.), 63'; Castillo 78'

Stadio Comunale (Chiasso), Chiasso

13 February 2005
14:30 CET

BSC Young Boys	2 – 0	FC Thun
Neri 52', 90'

Stadion Neufeld, Bern

13 February 2005
14:30 CET

FC St. Gallen	3 – 3 (aet)	FC Aarau
Tachie-Mensah 5', 67'; Merenda 107'		Vanetta 3'; Beqiri 57'; Fejzulahi 106'
Penalties
	3 – 4

Espenmoos, St. Gallen

13 February 2005
14:30 CET

AC Bellinzona	0 – 2	FC Zürich
		Bell 15' (o.g.); Keita 41'

Stadio Comunale Bellinzona, Bellinzona
