= Leandro Vieira (footballer) =

Brazilian footballer

Personal information
- Full name: Leandro Ricardo Vieira
- Date of birth: 3 April 1979 (age 47)
- Place of birth: Santo André, São Paulo, Brazil
- Height: 1.79 m (5 ft 10 1/2 in)
- Position: Wingback

Senior career*
Years	Team	Apps	(Gls)
- Portuguesa
2000–2003	Coritiba	1	(0)
2001	→ Deportivo Pasto (loan)		
2004	Malutrom		
2004	Kyoto Purple Sanga	1	(0)
2005	Veranópolis	0	(0)
2005–2006	Thun	21	(1)
2007–2008	Teplice	3	(0)
2007–2008	→ Teplice B		
- * Club domestic league appearances and goals

Leandro Ricardo Vieira (born 3 April 1979) is a former Brazilian footballer. He spent most of his career at Brazilian lower division, but made a successful career with Swiss club FC Thun, where he played at 2005–06 UEFA Champions League.

Leandro Vieira spent 2003 season with Coritiba, played once in national league A. In 2004 season he left for Malutrom then signed by J2 League side Kyoto Purple Sanga. In 2005 season he was signed by Veranópolis for 2005 Campeonato Gaúcho. In July 2005, along with countryman Adriano Pimenta, Tiago Bernardini and Adriano Spadoto were joined Swiss Super League side FC Thun, which he played all 6 group stage matches of 2005–06 UEFA Champions League as starter. The small Swiss club reached its highest peak in European competitions that season, eventually losing to Hamburger SV in 2005–06 UEFA Cup round of 32.

He left the club in 2006. In 2007–08 season he was signed by Czech club Teplice but for its B team. He was injured in October 2008.
