= Matteo Gritti =

Italian footballer

Personal information
- Date of birth: 11 June 1980 (age 46)
- Place of birth: Seriate, Italy
- Height: 1.87 m (6 ft 1 1/2 in)
- Position: Goalkeeper

Senior career*
Years	Team	Apps	(Gls)
1998–1999	Bassano Virtus	34	(0)
1999–2001	Atalanta	0	(0)
2001–2002	Oggiono	28	(0)
2002–2003	Alzano	28	(0)
2003–2004	AlbinoLeffe	6	(0)
2004–2005	Palazzolo	23	(0)
2005–2006	AC Lugano	20	(0)
2006–2008	BSC Young Boys	7	(0)
2007–2008	→ Chiasso (loan)	33	(0)
2008–2011	AC Bellinzona	60	(0)
2012	Petrolul Ploieşti	3	(0)
- * Club domestic league appearances and goals as of 22 June 2012

Matteo Gritti (born 11 June 1980) is an Italian retired footballer who played as a goalkeeper.

He is not to be confused with Serie C2 player Matteo Gritti (born 1986).

== Career ==
Born in Seriate, about 4 km southeast of Bergamo, Gritti started his career at Serie D club Bassano Virtus before returned to Lombardy for Atalanta Bergamo. After two seasons at their youth teams, Gritti moved back to Serie D for Oggiono, which also located in Lombardy. He played for the club as regular starter before signed for Serie C1 club Alzano, his third Lombardy club. He then signed by the Province of Bergamo based AlbinoLeffe, which in 2002–03 in the same group with Alzano, but Alzano relegated and AlbinoLeffe promoted.

At AlbinoLeffe, he worked as backup for another Province of Bergamo native, Paolo Acerbis.

In 2004–05 season, he played for his 6th Lombardy club Palazzolo at Serie C2.

In mid-2005, he abroad to Switzerland for AC Lugano, which from Ticino, an Italian speaking region. His performance made Swiss giant BSC Young Boys signed him, worked as Marco Wölfli's backup. After Young Boys re-signed their youth product Paolo Collaviti as new backup goalkeeper, Gritti went on loan to Chiasso of Ticino.

After a loan spells at Challenge League, he signed for Swiss Super League newcomer AC Bellinzona in July 2008. He became the no.1 goalkeeper ahead Lorenzo Bucchi at the start of season, but Bucchi regain his place until the arrival of former A.S. Roma goalkeeper Carlo Zotti. Gritti was released on 30 June 2011.

In February 2012, Gritti signed a contract with Petrolul Ploieşti, in Liga I, until the end of the season. He played only three games for Petrolul, and his contract wasn't renewed.
