= Grégory Duruz =

Swiss footballer (born 1977)

Personal information
- Date of birth: 20 April 1977 (age 49)
- Height: 1.78 m (5 ft 10 in)
- Position: Left-back

Youth career
- –1995: FC Sion

Senior career*
Years	Team	Apps	(Gls)
1995–2002	FC Sion	119	(1)
1997	→ SR Delémont (loan)	14	(0)
1997	→ Vevey Sports (loan)	11	(0)
2002–2004	FC Basel	33	(0)
2004–2005	Amiens	15	(0)
2005–2006	FC Thun	23	(0)
2006	New Zealand Knights	12	(0)
2007	Chiasso	5	(0)
2007–2009	FC La Tour/Le Pâquier		
2009–2010	Servette		

International career
	Switzerland U-21	2	(0)

Managerial career
- 2014–2018: Servette youth
- * Club domestic league appearances and goals

Grégory Duruz (born 20 April 1977) is a Swiss former professional footballer who played as a left-back. He is entrepreneur and now football coach and experience sports coach.

== Club career ==
=== Sion ===
Duruz played in the youth department of FC Sion and advanced to their first team in 1996 signing his first professional contract. In the 1996–97 season they won the championship. From January to June 1997 he was loaned out to SR Delémont and from July until December the same year loaned out to Vevey Sports. He then returned to his club of origin and became regular starter. In the 1998–99 season they suffered relegation but in the 1999–2000 Nationalliga A they achieved immediate re-promotion. Duruz stayed with the club two further seasons.

=== Basel ===
In July 2002 he signed for reigning Swiss Champions FC Basel and joined their first team for their 2002–03 season under head coach Christian Gross. After playing in five test games Duruz played his domestic league debut for his new club in the home game in the St. Jakob-Park on 20 July as Basel won 1–0 against SR Delémont. Basel's 2002–03 UEFA Champions League season started in the second qualifying round. After beating Žilina 4–1 on aggregate and Celtic on the away goals rule after a 3–3 aggregate, Basel advanced to the group stage. They ended this in second position behind Valencia, but ahead of Liverpool and Spartak Moscow to advance to the second group stage. They ended this in third position behind Manchester United and Juventus, but ahead of Deportivo La Coruña. Duruz played in 11 of these 16 European games. Basel ended their league season as runners-up, but in the cup they advanced to the final and here they beat Xamax 6–0 to defend the title that they had won a season earlier. Duruz played in three of the cup games, but missed the final due to injury.

In their 2003–04 league season the team started well, winning their first 13 matches straight out. The first defeat came on matchday 24. Basel won the championship with 26 victories and seven draws, the team had suffered just three away defeats, and obtained 85 points. Duruz was used mainly as substitute. and so he decided to move on. During his time with them he played a total of 78 games for Basel without scoring a goal. 32 of these games were in the Swiss Super League, three in the Swiss Cup, 11 in the Champions League and 32 were friendly games.

=== Amiens and Thun ===
In the summer of 2004 he signed for Amiens SC and played for them in their 2004–05 season und head coach Alex Dupont in the second division of French football. But he could not strengthen the team and moved on at the end of the season. He then returned to Switzerland and singned for FC Thun in advance of their 2005–06 season under head coach Urs Schönenberger. Thun played in the 2005–06 Champions League and advanced to the group stage. However, Duruz came to only two appearances during this group stage.

=== Later years ===
Duruz then moved to New Zealand and signed for the Knights. He played for them in their 2006–07 season in the that season's A-League. The team finished the season in last position and the club was then disbanded. Duruz returned to Switzerland and played for FC Chiasso during the second half of the 2006–07 Challenge League season. He then played two seasons for amateur club FC La Tour/Le Pâquier in the 1st League Classic, fourth tier of Swiss football. He then moved to Servette FC and ended his active playing career.

== International career ==
Duruz has represented Switzerland at U-16, U-18, U-20 and U-21 level.

== Personal life ==
Duruz speaks three languages: German, French and English. He did his apprentship as clerk in a bank before signing his professional footballer contract. After his career he completer further education, became football coach and experience sports coach. Since July 2022 he is employed as Entrepreneur de football & Talent Manager for Neuchâtel Xamax FCS.

== Sources ==
- Die ersten 125 Jahre. Publisher: Josef Zindel im Friedrich Reinhardt Verlag, Basel. ISBN 978-3-7245-2305-5
- Verein "Basler Fussballarchiv" Homepage
