= Yao Aziawonou =

Togolese footballer

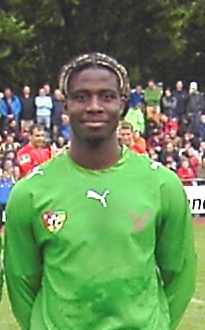

Personal information
- Full name: Yao Kaka Aziawonou
- Date of birth: 30 November 1979 (age 46)
- Place of birth: Lomé, Togo
- Height: 1.85 m (6 ft 1 in)
- Position: Midfielder

Senior career*
Years	Team	Apps	(Gls)
1996–1997	Étoile Filante	0	(0)
1997–1998	FC Nantes	1	(1)
1998–1999	FC Sion	5	(0)
1999–2000	FC Wangen bei Olten	7	(1)
2000–2001	FC Basel	16	(0)
2001–2003	FC Thun	39	(8)
2003–2004	Servette FC	30	(5)
2004–2006	BSC Young Boys	37	(1)
2006–2007	→ FC Luzern (loan)	8	(0)
2006–2007	BSC Young Boys	5	(0)
2008–2009	FC Winterthur	20	(0)
2009–2010	FC Grenchen	7	(0)
2013–2015	Concordia Basel	8	(0)

International career
1995–2010	Togo	34	(1)
- * Club domestic league appearances and goals

Yao Kaka Aziawonou (born 30 November 1979) is a Togolese former footballer. He played as a midfielder and spent his career with several clubs in France and Switzerland.

He also played for the Togo national team, representing the country at the 2006 FIFA World Cup.

== Club career ==
Aziawonou began his career in 1996 with Étoile Filante in his hometown of Lomé. In 1997, he moved to France to join Nantes, where he played in the club's youth system. He made one appearance for the first team during the 1997–98 season, scoring one goal. He then moved to Switzerland, where he made five appearances for Sion during the 1998–99 season. He subsequently spent one season with Wangen bei Olten, making seven appearances and scoring one goal.

In 2000, Aziawonou joined Basel, making five appearances during the 2000–01 season and 17 during the 2001–02 season. During the 2001–02 season, he was loaned to Thun, making five appearances, before joining the club permanently. In the 2002–03 season, he made 34 appearances and scored seven goals.

After joining Servette in 2003, Aziawonou made 30 appearances and scored five goals during the 2003–04 season. He moved to Young Boys in 2004 and played for the club for two seasons, making 15 appearances and scoring one goal in the 2004–05 season and making 22 appearances in the 2005–06 season.

During the 2006–07 season, he was loaned to Luzern, making eight appearances, before returning to Young Boys and making five more appearances. He then joined Winterthur in 2008, making 20 appearances in the Swiss Challenge League. In 2009, he moved to Grenchen, where he made seven appearances.

In 2013, he joined Concordia Basel. He made eight appearances in the Swiss 1. Liga during the 2013–14 season before ending his playing career.

== International career ==
Aziawonou was first called up to the Togo national team in 1995 and represented the national team from 1995 to 2007. During the 2006 FIFA World Cup qualifiers, he contributed to Togo's qualification for the tournament, helping the country reach the FIFA World Cup finals for the first time in its history.

He was part of the Togo national team at the 2006 Africa Cup of Nations and also played at the 2006 FIFA World Cup that same year. He appeared in the group-stage matches against the South Korea and the France national teams, playing a total of 95 minutes across the two matches.
