= Di Fábio (footballer) =

Italian-Brazilian footballer (born 1979)

Personal information
- Full name: João Paulo di Fabio
- Date of birth: 10 February 1979 (age 47)
- Place of birth: São Carlos, Brazil
- Height: 1.85 m (6 ft 1 in)
- Position: Center back

Senior career*
Years	Team	Apps	(Gls)
2001	Atlético Paranaense		
2002–2004	Cagliari	15	(0)
2004–2005	Como	33	(1)
2006–2008	Thun	51	(0)
2008–2009	Busan IPark	20	(0)
2010–2011	Portimonense	15	(0)
2011	ASA	15	(0)
2012	América-SP	10	(1)
2013	Ferroviária	15	(0)
2014	Água Santa	6	(0)
- * Club domestic league appearances and goals

João Paulo di Fabio (born 10 February 1979), known as Di Fábio, is an Italian-Brazilian former football defender.

He started his professional career at Atlético Paranaense and formerly played for Cagliari Calcio, Como Calcio in Italy, FC Thun in Switzerland, Busan I'Park in South Korea and Portimonense S.C. in Portugal.

He also holds Italian passport.
