= Paolo Collaviti =

Swiss football player (born 1978)

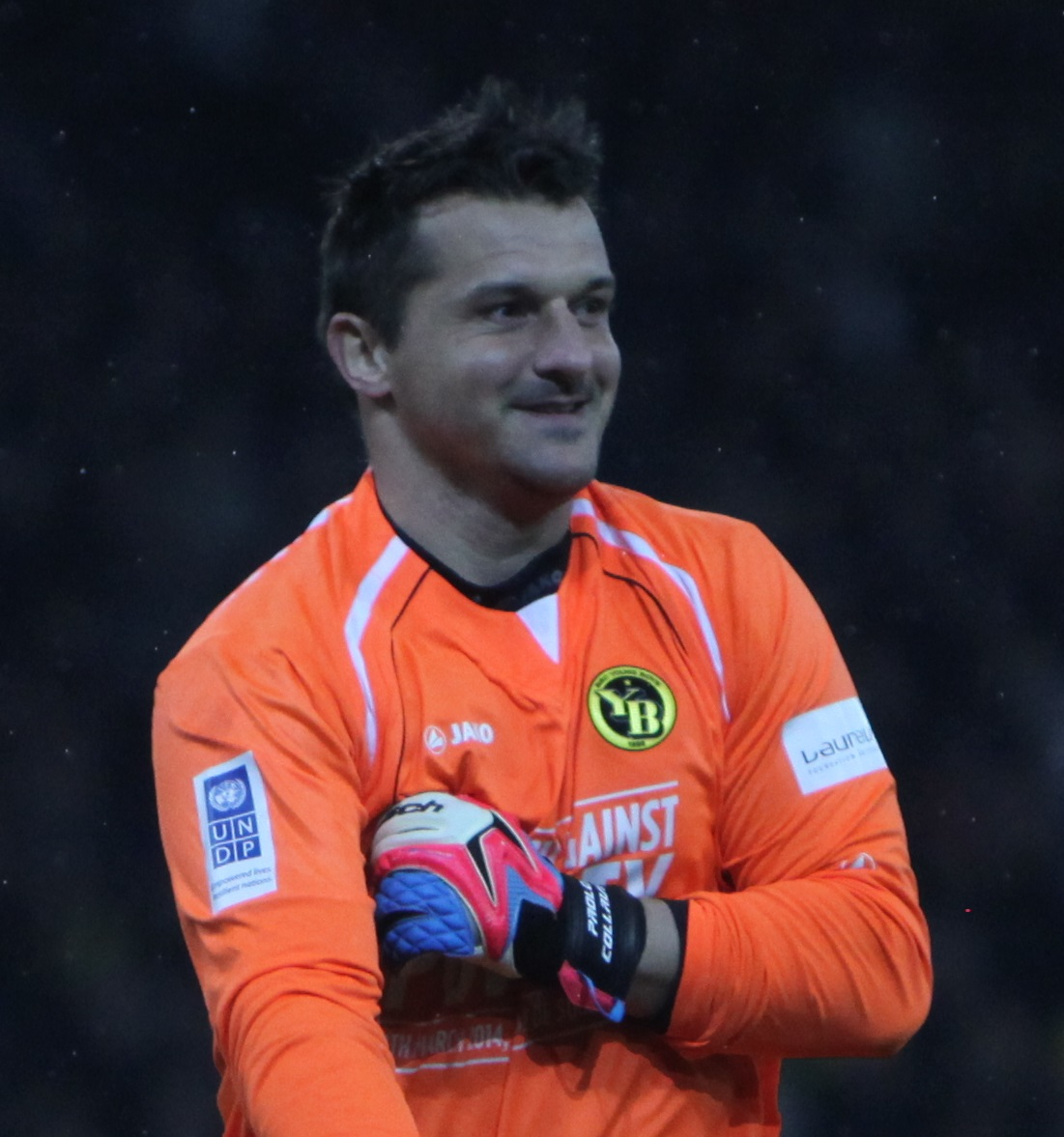

Personal information
- Full name: Paolo Collaviti
- Date of birth: 2 February 1978 (age 48)
- Place of birth: Lyss, Switzerland
- Height: 1.80 m (5 ft 11 in)
- Position: Goalkeeper

Team information
- Current team: BSC Young Boys
- Number: 18

Senior career*
Years	Team	Apps	(Gls)
1998–2004	BSC Young Boys		
2000	→ FC Luzern (loan)		
2004–2005	Servette FC		
2005–2006	FC Concordia Basel		
2006–2007	Yverdon-Sport		
2007–2010	BSC Young Boys		
- * Club domestic league appearances and goals

Paolo Collaviti (born 2 February 1978 in Lyss, Canton of Bern) is a Swiss football player. He currently plays for BSC Young Boys.

He signed a 1+1 contract with club on 30 June 2007, and compete the first choice goalkeeper place with Marco Wölfli, to replace Matteo Gritti.
