= Laufen, Switzerland =

Laufen
- Municipality
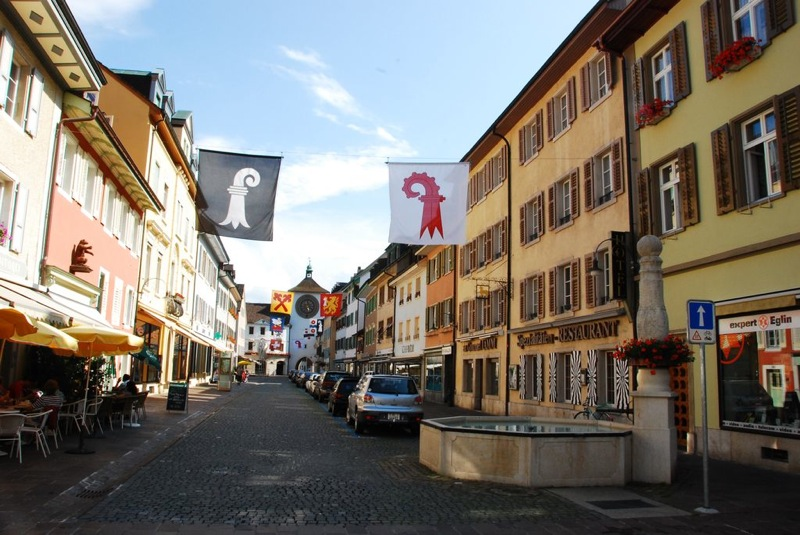

- Coat of arms
- Location of Laufen
- Location within Switzerland Location within Canton of Basel-Landschaft
- Coordinates: 47°25′N 7°30′E
- Country: Switzerland
- Canton: Basel-Landschaft
- District: Laufen

Area
  - Total: 11.37 km^{2} (4.39 sq mi)
- Elevation: 354 m (1,161 ft)

Population (March 2008)
  - Total: 5,172
  - Density: 454.9/km^{2} (1,178/sq mi)
- Time zone: UTC+01:00 (CET)
  - Summer (DST): UTC+02:00 (CEST)
- Postal code: 4242
- SFOS number: 2787
- ISO 3166 code: CH-BL
- Surrounded by: Bärschwil (SO), Brislach, Dittingen, Grindel (SO), Liesberg, Röschenz, Wahlen bei Laufen, Zwingen
- Twin towns: Laufen (Germany)
- Website: laufen-bl.ch

Laufen (German pronunciation: [ˈlaʊfn̩]; French: Laufon [loːfɔ̃]; High Alemannic: Laufe) is a municipality and the capital of the district of Laufen in the canton of Basel-Country in Switzerland.

Laufen is a principal train station for the surrounding area, connecting it to Basel.

== History ==
Between 58 BC and 470 AD, Laufen was part of the Roman Empire; after the empire collapsed it was part of the Alemanish area for several decades. During the early sixth century, the entire valley came into the possession of France, and from 853 until 1033 it was part of the Burgundian Kingdom. In 999 Rudolf III, the childless king of Burgundy donated most of the Laufen valley territory to the Archbishopric of Basel.

Laufen is first mentioned in 1141 as Loufen. For a time, it was known by its French name Laufon. In 1295 Peter Reich von Reichenstein founded the small town of Laufen.

== Geography ==
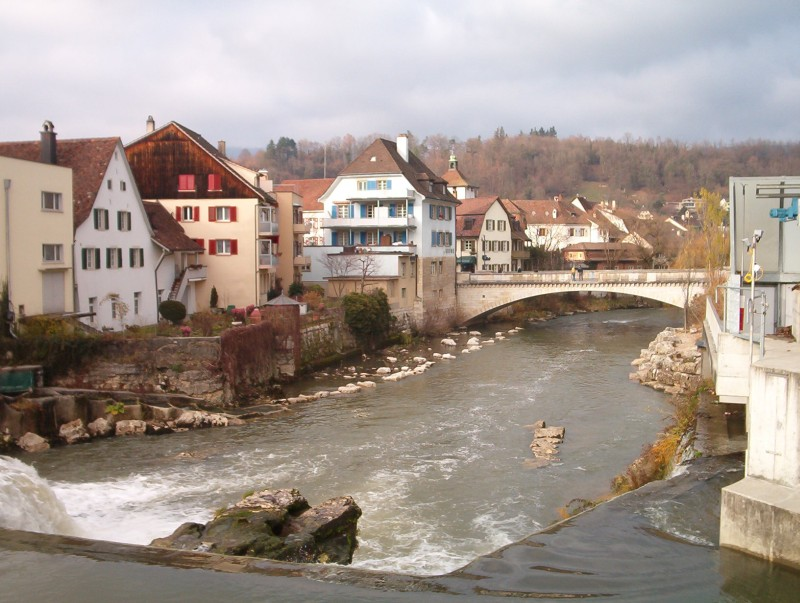
Birs river at Laufen

Aerial view (1950)

Laufen has an area, as of 2009, of 11.37 square kilometers (4.39 sq mi). Of this area, 3.07 km^{2} (1.19 sq mi) or 27.0% is used for agricultural purposes, while 6 km^{2} (2.3 sq mi) or 52.8% is forested. Of the rest of the land, 2.15 km^{2} (0.83 sq mi) or 18.9% is settled (buildings or roads), 0.1 km^{2} (25 acres) or 0.9% is either rivers or lakes and 0.02 km^{2} (4.9 acres) or 0.2% is unproductive land.

Of the built up area, industrial buildings made up 3.5% of the total area while housing and buildings made up 8.3% and transportation infrastructure made up 5.0%. Power and water infrastructure as well as other special developed areas made up 1.1% of the area while parks, green belts and sports fields made up 1.1%. Out of the forested land, 51.5% of the total land area is heavily forested and 1.2% is covered with orchards or small clusters of trees. Of the agricultural land, 18.7% is used for growing crops and 7.7% is pastures. All the water in the municipality is flowing water.

The municipality is the capital of the Laufen district. It consists of the old city of Laufen, within the city walls, the settlement outside the walls by the waterfall and since the 20th Century, settlements on both sides of the Birs river. The old city and the settlement outside the walls merged in 1852.

== Coat of arms ==
The blazon of the municipal coat of arms is Sable, a Crozier Argent.

== Demographics ==
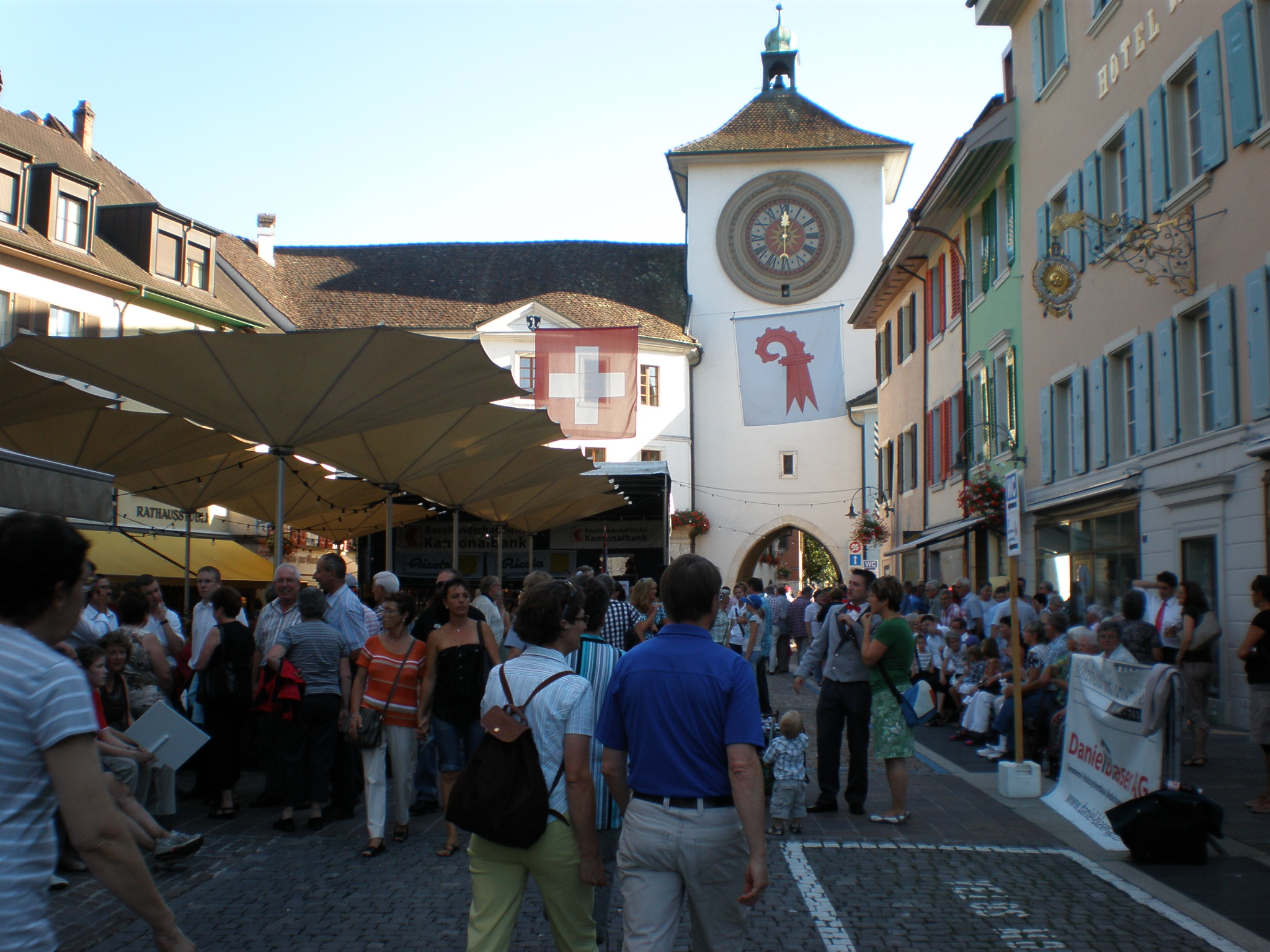
Laufen Dorffest (village festival)

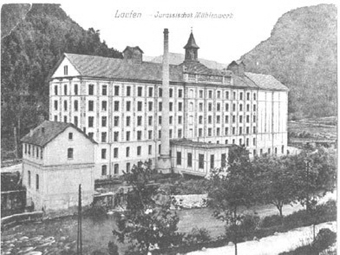
Mill in Laufen in 1901

Laufen has a population (as of June 2021) of 5,814. As of 2008, 22.3% of the population are resident foreign nationals. Over the last 10 years (1997–2007) the population has changed at a rate of 10.8%.

Most of the population (as of 2000) speaks German (4,020 or 82.8%), with Italian language being second most common (333 or 6.9%) and Spanish being third (125 or 2.6%). There are 72 people who speak French and 4 people who speak Romansh.

As of 2008, the gender distribution of the population was 49.4% male and 50.6% female. The population was made up of 4,016 Swiss citizens (76.2% of the population), and 1,252 non-Swiss residents (23.8%) Of the population in the municipality 1,553 or about 32.0% were born in Laufen and lived there in 2000. There were 794 or 16.3% who were born in the same canton, while 1,339 or 27.6% were born somewhere else in Switzerland, and 1,005 or 20.7% were born outside of Switzerland.

In 2008 there were 35 live births to Swiss citizens and 11 births to non-Swiss citizens, and in same time span there were 38 deaths of Swiss citizens and 5 non-Swiss citizen deaths. Ignoring immigration and emigration, the population of Swiss citizens decreased by 3 while the foreign population increased by 6. There were 12 Swiss men and 7 Swiss women who emigrated from Switzerland. At the same time, there were 14 non-Swiss men and 24 non-Swiss women who immigrated from another country to Switzerland. The total Swiss population change in 2008 (from all sources, including moves across municipal borders) was a decrease of 13 and the non-Swiss population change was an increase of 12 people. This represents a population growth rate of 0.0%.

The age distribution, as of 2010, in Laufen is; 338 children or 6.4% of the population are between 0 and 6 years old and 747 teenagers or 14.2% are between 7 and 19. Of the adult population, 714 people or 13.6% of the population are between 20 and 29 years old. 688 people or 13.1% are between 30 and 39, 902 people or 17.1% are between 40 and 49, and 987 people or 18.7% are between 50 and 64. The senior population distribution is 657 people or 12.5% of the population are between 65 and 79 years old and there are 235 people or 4.5% who are over 80.

As of 2000, there were 2,081 people who were single and never married in the municipality. There were 2,234 married individuals, 301 widows or widowers and 241 individuals who are divorced.

As of 2000, there were 2,085 private households in the municipality, and an average of 2.3 persons per household. There were 701 households that consist of only one person and 135 households with five or more people. Out of a total of 2,116 households that answered this question, 33.1% were households made up of just one person and 17 were adults who lived with their parents. Of the rest of the households, there are 571 married couples without children, 606 married couples with children. There were 151 single parents with a child or children. There were 39 households that were made up unrelated people and 31 households that were made some sort of institution or another collective housing.

In 2000 there were 625 single-family homes (or 60.4% of the total) out of a total of 1,035 inhabited buildings. There were 191 multi-family buildings (18.5%), along with 130 multi-purpose buildings that were mostly used for housing (12.6%) and 89 other use buildings (commercial or industrial) that also had some housing (8.6%). Of the single-family homes 40 were built before 1919, while 73 were built between 1990 and 2000. The greatest number of single-family homes (142) were built between 1981 and 1990.

In 2000 there were 2,226 apartments in the municipality. The most common apartment size was 3 rooms of which there were 634. There were 86 single-room apartments and 595 apartments with five or more rooms. Of these apartments, a total of 2,028 apartments (91.1% of the total) were permanently occupied, while 130 apartments (5.8%) were seasonally occupied and 68 apartments (3.1%) were empty. As of 2007, the construction rate of new housing units was 2.7 new units per 1000 residents. As of 2000 the average price to rent a two-room apartment was about 782.00 CHF (US$630, £350, €500), a three-room apartment was about 1017.00 CHF (US$810, £460, €650) and a four-room apartment cost an average of 1238.00 CHF (US$990, £560, €790). The vacancy rate for the municipality, in 2008, was 0.34%.

The historical population is given in the following chart:

== Heritage sites of national significance ==
The Christian-Catholic Church of St. Katharina is listed as a Swiss heritage site of national significance. The entire old city of Laufen in part of the Inventory of Swiss Heritage Sites. The Neolithic cist gravesite situated within the municipality was listed as a Swiss heritage site of national significance in 1995, but is no longer included in the list.

== Politics ==
In the 2007 federal election the most popular party was the FDP which received 29.87% of the vote. The next three most popular parties were the CVP (23.58%), the SVP (21.01%) and the SP (13.87%). In the federal election, a total of 1,755 votes were cast, and the voter turnout was 52.2%.

== Economy ==
As of 2007, Laufen had an unemployment rate of 2.87%. As of 2005, there were 35 people employed in the primary economic sector and about 12 businesses involved in this sector. 966 people were employed in the secondary sector and there were 59 businesses in this sector. 2,134 people were employed in the tertiary sector, with 275 businesses in this sector. There were 2,549 residents of the municipality who were employed in some capacity, of which females made up 43.5% of the workforce.

In 2008 the total number of full-time equivalent jobs was 2,691. The number of jobs in the primary sector was 21, of which 16 were in agriculture and 6 were in forestry or lumber production. The number of jobs in the secondary sector was 947, of which 750 or (79.2%) were in manufacturing, 15 or (1.6%) were in mining and 177 (18.7%) were in construction. The number of jobs in the tertiary sector was 1,723. In the tertiary sector; 424 or 24.6% were in wholesale or retail sales or the repair of motor vehicles, 105 or 6.1% were in the movement and storage of goods, 81 or 4.7% were in a hotel or restaurant, 12 or 0.7% were in the information industry, 195 or 11.3% were the insurance or financial industry, 146 or 8.5% were technical professionals or scientists, 141 or 8.2% were in education and 434 or 25.2% were in health care.

In 2000, there were 2,656 workers who commuted into the municipality and 1,431 workers who commuted away. The municipality is a net importer of workers, with about 1.9 workers entering the municipality for every one leaving. About 13.1% of the workforce coming into Laufen are coming from outside Switzerland. Of the working population, 18.4% used public transportation to get to work, and 41.2% used a private car.

Laufen has the head office of Ricola, and Laufen Bathrooms AG.

== Religion ==
From the 2000 census, 3,058 or 63.0% were Roman Catholic, while 692 or 14.2% belonged to the Swiss Reformed Church. Of the rest of the population, there were 47 members of an Orthodox church (or about 0.97% of the population), there were 100 individuals (or about 2.06% of the population) who belonged to the Christian Catholic Church, and there were 47 individuals (or about 0.97% of the population) who belonged to another Christian church. There were 5 individuals (or about 0.10% of the population) who were Jewish, and 254 (or about 5.23% of the population) who were Muslim. There were 11 individuals who were Buddhist, 51 individuals who were Hindu, and 5 individuals who belonged to another church. 399 (or about 8.21% of the population) belonged to no church, are agnostic or atheist, and 188 individuals (or about 3.87% of the population) did not answer the question.

== Weather ==
Laufen has an average of 139.1 days of rain or snow per year and on average receives 1,021 mm (40.2 in) of precipitation. The wettest month is August during which time Laufen receives an average of 119 mm (4.7 in) of rain or snow. During this month there is precipitation for an average of 12.1 days. The month with the most days of precipitation is May, with an average of 14.4, but with only 109 mm (4.3 in) of rain or snow. The driest month of the year is February with an average of 66 mm (2.6 in) of precipitation over 11.2 days.

== Education ==
In Laufen about 1,648 or (33.9%) of the population have completed non-mandatory upper secondary education, and 543 or (11.2%) have completed additional higher education (either university or a Fachhochschule). Of the 543 who completed tertiary schooling, 64.1% were Swiss men, 24.9% were Swiss women, 6.8% were non-Swiss men and 4.2% were non-Swiss women. As of 2000, there were 557 students in Laufen who came from another municipality, while 122 residents attended schools outside the municipality.

== Notable people ==
- David Pflugi (born 1969 near Laufen), an artist, he created the "Victory Works", five works of art for the FIFA football world cup
- Sehid Sinani (born 1982 in Laufen), a Swiss football defender
