= Sascha Stulz =

Swiss footballer (born 1988)

Personal information
- Date of birth: 3 June 1988 (age 38)
- Place of birth: Interlaken, Switzerland
- Height: 1.86 m (6 ft 1 in)
- Position: Goalkeeper

Youth career
- –2001: FC Hünibach
- 2001–2005: FC Thun

Senior career*
Years	Team	Apps	(Gls)
2005–2011	FC Thun	54	(0)
2005–2006	→ FC Dürrenast (loan)	1	(0)
2011	FC Schaffhausen	14	(0)
- * Club domestic league appearances and goals

Sascha Stulz (born 3 June 1988) is a Swiss former professional footballer who played as a goalkeeper.
