= Julien Poueys =

French footballer and manager (born 1979)

Personal information
- Full name: Julien Pierre Poueys
- Date of birth: 27 July 1979 (age 47)
- Place of birth: Orthez, France
- Height: 1.89 m (6 ft 2 in)
- Position: Forward

Team information
- Current team: Paulhan-Pézenas (manager)

Youth career
- EBF Orthez
- 1995–1998: Montpellier

Senior career*
Years	Team	Apps	(Gls)
1998–1999	Montpellier B		
1999–2000	Pau	17	(5)
2000	Lorca	5	(0)
2000–2001	Lleida	5	(0)
2001–2002	Sion	32	(17)
2002–2004	Sedan	11	(3)
2002–2003	→ Beauvais (loan)	16	(3)
2003–2004	→ Gazélec Ajaccio (loan)	5	(2)
2004–2005	Las Palmas	22	(2)
2005–2006	Gap	16	(2)
2006–2007	Genêts Anglet	27	(15)
2007–2009	Aviron Bayonnais	24	(3)
2009	Trélissac		
2009–2011	Chartres	69	(21)
2011–2013	Perpignan Canet	42	(20)
2013–2019	Paulhan-Pézenas	110+	(46+)

International career
1998	France U19	5	(4)

Managerial career
- 2018–: Paulhan-Pézenas
- * Club domestic league appearances and goals

Julien Pierre Poueys (born 27 July 1979) is a French football manager and former player who played as forward. As of the 2021–22 season, he is the head coach of Départemental 1 club Paulhan. (Note: Julien Poueys – French league stats at LFP – also available in French (archived))
