= Sandro Galli =

Swiss footballer (born 1987)

Personal information
- Date of birth: 4 May 1987 (age 39)
- Place of birth: Switzerland
- Height: 1.90 m (6 ft 3 in)
- Position: Defender

Team information
- Current team: SR Delémont

Senior career*
Years	Team	Apps	(Gls)
2005–2007	FC Thun		
2007–	SR Delémont		
- * Club domestic league appearances and goals as of 2 January 2008

Sandro Galli (born 4 May 1987) is a Swiss football defender, who currently plays for SR Delémont in the Swiss Challenge League.
