= Fabian Stoller =

Swiss footballer (born 1988)

Personal information
- Date of birth: 31 March 1988 (age 38)
- Place of birth: Lucerne, Switzerland
- Height: 1.80 m (5 ft 11 in)
- Position: Defensive midfielder

Team information
- Current team: FC Breitenrain Bern
- Number: 2

Senior career*
Years	Team	Apps	(Gls)
2005–2008	FC Thun	4	(0)
2008–2010	FC Locarno	57	(2)
2010–2011	FC Thun	12	(1)
2011–2012	Hapoel Petah Tikva	49	(3)
2012–2013	Hapoel Haifa	9	(1)
2013–2014	Platanias	13	(0)
2014–2015	Ethnikos Achna	47	(0)
2015–2016	FC Aarau	1	(0)
2016	→ FC Biel-Bienne (loan)	8	(0)
2016–2017	FC Le Mont	5	(0)
2017	SC Düdingen	11	(0)
2017–	FC Breitenrain Bern	5	(0)
- * Club domestic league appearances and goals as of 6 September 2017

Fabian Stoller (born 31 March 1988) is a Swiss football midfielder, who currently plays for FC Breitenrain Bern.
