= Nicolas Beney =

Swiss footballer (born 1980)

Personal information
- Date of birth: 14 September 1980 (age 46)
- Place of birth: Switzerland
- Height: 1.82 m (6 ft 0 in)
- Position: Goalkeeper

Senior career*
Years	Team	Apps	(Gls)
1997–1999	Yverdon-Sport FC	39	(0)
1999–2000	FC Schaffhausen	15	(0)
2000–2002	FC Sion	13	(0)
2002–2004	FC Wil 1900	55	(0)
2005	FC Vaduz	0	(0)
2005–2006	Yverdon-Sport FC	9	(0)
2006	FC Aarau	4	(0)
2007	FC Baulmes	3	(0)
2007–2010	FC Sion	7	(0)

International career
- Switzerland U-21
- * Club domestic league appearances and goals

Nicolas Beney (born 14 September 1980) is a Swiss former football goalkeeper.

== Personal life ==
Nicolas Beney has a daughter, Iman Beney, who is also a professional footballer.
