= 2004–05 Amiens SC season =

Amiens SC
2004–05 season
- President: Pascal Pouillot
- Head coach: Alex Dupont
- Stadium: Stade de la Licorne
- Ligue 2: Pre-season
- Coupe de France: Pre-season
- Coupe de la Ligue: First round
- Average home league attendance: 7,125

The 2004–05 Amiens SC season was the club's 104th season in existence and the fourth consecutive season in the second division of French football. In addition to the domestic league, Amiens participated in this season's edition of the Coupe de France and the Coupe de la Ligue. The season covered the period from 1 July 2004 to 30 June 2005.

== Pre-season and friendlies ==
Win Draw Loss Fixtures

== Competitions ==
=== Overview ===
Competition	First match	Last match	Starting round	Final position	Record							
Competition	First match	Last match	Starting round	Final position	Pld	W	D	L	GF	GA	GD	Win %
Ligue 2	6 August 2004	27 May 2005	Matchday 1	13th	38	11	14	13	41	41	+0	28.95
Coupe de France	20 November 2004	11 December 2004	Seventh round	Eighth round	2	1	0	1	4	3	+1	50.00
Coupe de la Ligue	6 October 2004		First round	First round	1	0	1	0	2	2	+0	0.00
Total					41	12	15	14	47	46	+1	29.27

Source: Competitions

=== Ligue 2 ===
==== League table ====
Pos	Team	Pld	W	D	L	GF	GA	GD	Pts
11	Grenoble	38	12	12	14	45	50	−5	48
12	Gueugnon	38	12	12	14	30	40	−10	48
13	Amiens	38	11	14	13	41	41	0	47
14	Laval	38	13	8	17	43	51	−8	47
15	Créteil	38	11	13	14	42	38	+4	46

Source: Ligue 2

==== Results summary ====
Overall								Home						Away					
Pld	W	D	L	GF	GA	GD	Pts	W	D	L	GF	GA	GD	W	D	L	GF	GA	GD
38	11	14	13	41	41	0	47	7	7	5	25	21	+4	4	7	8	16	20	−4

==== Results by round ====
Round	1	2	3	4	5	6	7	8	9	10	11	12	13	14	15	16	17	18	19	20	21	22	23	24	25	26	27	28	29	30	31	32	33	34	35	36	37	38
Ground	A	H	A	H	A	H	A	H	A	H	A	H	A	H	A	A	H	A	H	A	H	A	H	A	H	A	H	A	H	A	H	A	H	H	A	H	A	H
Result	D	L	D	W	W	D	W	W	D	L	W	L	L	W	L	D	D	D	D	L	L	D	L	L	W	L	W	L	D	W	D	L	W	D	L	D	D	W
Position	10	14	14	13	8	9	4	3	3	6	4	6	6	4	7	6	8	9	10	12	14	14	14	14	14	14	14	14	14	13	13	14	13	14	14	14	14	12

A = Away; H = Home; W = Win; D = Draw; L = Loss

==== Matches ====
6 August 2004 1	Gueugnon	1–1	Amiens	Gueugnon
--:-- CEST (UTC+2)

13 August 2004 2	Amiens	1–2	Le Havre	Amiens
--:-- CEST (UTC+2)				Stadium: Stade de la Licorne

17 August 2004 3	Grenoble	1–1	Amiens	Grenoble
--:-- CEST (UTC+2)

20 August 2004 4	Amiens	1–0	Brest	Amiens
--:-- CEST (UTC+2)				Stadium: Stade de la Licorne

27 August 2004 5	Sedan	0–1	Amiens	Sedan
--:-- CEST (UTC+2)

5 September 2004 6	Amiens	2–2	Châteauroux	Amiens
--:-- CEST (UTC+2)				Stadium: Stade de la Licorne

13 September 2004 7	Montpellier	0–2	Amiens	Montpellier
--:-- CEST (UTC+2)

17 September 2004 8	Amiens	2–1	Dijon	Amiens
--:-- CEST (UTC+2)				Stadium: Stade de la Licorne

22 September 2004 9	Troyes	0–0	Amiens
--:-- CEST (UTC+2)

25 September 2004 10	Amiens	0–2	Angers	Amiens
--:-- CEST (UTC+2)				Stadium: Stade de la Licorne

1 October 2004 11	Lorient	1–2	Amiens
--:-- CEST (UTC+2)

15 October 2004 12	Amiens	0–3	Nancy	Amiens
--:-- CEST (UTC+2)				Stadium: Stade de la Licorne

25 October 2004 13	Guingamp	2–1	Amiens
--:-- CEST (UTC+2)

29 October 2004 14	Amiens	4–1	Niort	Amiens
--:-- CEST (UTC+2)				Stadium: Stade de la Licorne

5 November 2004 15	Laval	1–0	Amiens
--:-- CEST (UTC+2)

12 November 2004 16	Clermont	0–0	Amiens
--:-- CEST (UTC+2)

26 November 2004 17	Amiens	0–0	Créteil	Amiens
--:-- CEST (UTC+2)				Stadium: Stade de la Licorne

3 December 2004 18	Reims	0–0	Amiens
--:-- CEST (UTC+2)

17 December 2004 19	Amiens	0–0	Le Mans	Amiens
--:-- CEST (UTC+2)				Stadium: Stade de la Licorne

11 January 2005 20	Le Havre	1–0	Amiens
--:-- CEST (UTC+2)

17 January 2005 21	Amiens	0–2	Grenoble	Amiens
--:-- CEST (UTC+2)				Stadium: Stade de la Licorne

21 January 2005 22	Brest	1–1	Amiens
--:-- CEST (UTC+2)

25 January 2005 23	Amiens	1–2	Sedan	Amiens
--:-- CEST (UTC+2)				Stadium: Stade de la Licorne

28 January 2005 24	Châteauroux	1–0	Amiens
--:-- CEST (UTC+2)

4 February 2005 25	Amiens	2–0	Montpellier	Amiens
--:-- CEST (UTC+2)				Stadium: Stade de la Licorne

18 February 2005 26	Dijon	2–1	Amiens
--:-- CEST (UTC+2)

25 February 2005 27	Amiens	3–2	Troyes	Amiens
--:-- CEST (UTC+2)				Stadium: Stade de la Licorne

4 March 2005 28	Angers	3–2	Amiens
--:-- CEST (UTC+2)

11 March 2005 29	Amiens	0–0	Lorient	Amiens
--:-- CEST (UTC+2)				Stadium: Stade de la Licorne

20 March 2005 30	Nancy	1–2	Amiens
--:-- CEST (UTC+2)

1 April 2005 31	Amiens	1–1	Guingamp	Amiens
--:-- CEST (UTC+2)				Stadium: Stade de la Licorne

8 April 2005 32	Niort	3–1	Amiens
--:-- CEST (UTC+2)

15 April 2005 33	Amiens	2–1	Laval	Amiens
--:-- CEST (UTC+2)				Stadium: Stade de la Licorne

22 April 2005 34	Amiens	1–1	Clermont	Amiens
--:-- CEST (UTC+2)				Stadium: Stade de la Licorne

6 May 2005 35	Créteil	1–0	Amiens
--:-- CEST (UTC+2)

13 May 2005 36	Amiens	1–1	Reims	Amiens
--:-- CEST (UTC+2)				Stadium: Stade de la Licorne

20 May 2005 37	Le Mans	1–1	Amiens
--:-- CEST (UTC+2)

27 May 2005 38	Amiens	4–0	Gueugnon	Amiens
--:-- CEST (UTC+2)				Stadium: Stade de la Licorne

=== Coupe de France ===
20 November 2004 Seventh round	Amiens	4–1	US Ivry	Amiens
--:-- CEST (UTC+2)				Stadium: Stade de la Licorne

11 December 2004 Seventh round	Olympique Saumur FC	2–0	Amiens	Saumur
--:-- CEST (UTC+2)

=== Coupe de la Ligue ===
6 October 2004 First round	Troyes	2–2 (a.e.t.) (3–2 p)	Amiens	Troyes
--:-- CEST (UTC+2)				Stadium: Stade de l'Aube; Attendance: 4,210; Referee: Sandryk Biton
