= Adriano Pimenta =

Brazilian footballer (born 1982)

Personal information
- Full name: Adriano Faria Pimenta
- Date of birth: 14 November 1982 (age 43)
- Place of birth: Goiânia, Brazil
- Height: 1.69 m (5 ft 7 in)
- Position: Attacking midfielder

Senior career*
Years	Team	Apps	(Gls)
2000–2005	Guarani FC		
2001	→ Nagoya Grampus Eight (loan)	1	(0)
2005–2007	FC Thun	47	(3)
2007	→ Yokohama FC (loan)	3	(0)
2008	Bragantino		
2008	Waitakere United	0	(0)
2009	Blooming	24	(1)
2009–2010	Sport Recife	24	(2)
2010	→ Grêmio Prudente (loan)	19	(2)
2011	Fortaleza	9	(2)
2011	Sport Recife	3	(0)
2011–2012	Atlético Goianiense	23	(0)
2014–2015	Paranavaí	?	(?)
2018–?	Rio Branco	11	(0)
- * Club domestic league appearances and goals

Adriano Faria Pimenta (born 14 November 1982) is a Brazilian former professional footballer who played as an attacking midfielder.

== Career ==
Pimenta was born in Goiânia. He started his career in the youth squad of Guarani FC. Before the 2000–01 season he transferred to the Japanese club Nagoya Grampus Eight. After one season in Japan he returned to Guarani FC, but continued to play only a substitute role. He therefore transferred before the 2005–06 season to the Swiss Super League club FC Thun and signed a contract through June 2008. In Thun he immediately established himself in the starting squad and became a regular for the club. He plays in the role of midfield play maker.

During the away leg of the qualifying match for the 2005–06 UEFA Champions League group stage against Malmö FF Pimenta scored the deciding goal in Thun's 1–0 win. He played in all six group stage matches for Thun and scored in the home match against Ajax to make the score 2–2 at the time. After the conclusion of the group stage FC Thun was in third place and qualified to play in the UEFA Cup first knock-out stage. Pimenta played in both matches against German club Hamburger SV and scored the winning goal in the 1–0 home win for Thun. Due to the 2–0 loss in the away leg FC Thun was knocked out of the competition at this stage.

On 15 January 2007, Pimenta moved to Japan again to play for J1 League division 1 side Yokohama FC.

In January 2008, he returned to Swiss side Thun, but in February 2008, he left for Bragantino.

In October 2008, Pimenta signed with 2007–08 New Zealand football champions Waitakere United.

In January 2009, he arrived in Bolivia and signed a one-year contract with club Blooming. In August 2009 Pimenta reached a mutual agreement with Blooming and the contract was terminated, then he returned to Brazil and joined first division club Sport Recife at the time. The following year Pimenta was loaned to Grêmio Prudente, and not long after he moved to Fortaleza.

== Career statistics ==
Club performance			League		Cup		League Cup		Total	
Season	Club	League	Apps	Goals	Apps	Goals	Apps	Goals	Apps	Goals
Japan			League		Emperor's Cup		J.League Cup		Total	
2001	Nagoya Grampus Eight	J1 League	1	0	0	0	1	0	2	0
2007	Yokohama FC	J1 League	3	0	0	0	4	2	7	2
Total			4	0	0	0	5	2	9	2

== Honours ==
- Campeonato Pernambucano in 2010 with Sport Recife
