= Alain Portmann =

Swiss footballer (born 1981)

Personal information
- Date of birth: 14 February 1981 (age 45)
- Place of birth: Switzerland
- Height: 1.83 m (6 ft 0 in)
- Position: Goalkeeper

Team information
- Current team: FC Breitenrain

Senior career*
| Years | Team | Apps | (Gls) |
| 2000–2001 | FC Solothurn | 28 | (0) |
| 2001–2003 | SR Delémont | 50 | (0) |
| 2003–2004 | Yverdon-Sport FC | 21 | (0) |
| 2004–2008 | FC Thun | 31 | (0) |
| 2008 | FC Concordia Basel | 9 | (0) |
| 2009 | FC Breitenrain | | |

International career
| ?–2004 | Switzerland U21 | | |
- * Club domestic league appearances and goals as of 14 May 2008

Alain Portmann (born 14 February 1981) is a Swiss football goalkeeper, who currently plays for FC Breitenrain (as of 2009–10 season).

He won promotion to Swiss Super League with SR Delémont in 2002.
