= Adriano Spadoto =

Brazilian footballer (born 1977)

Personal information
- Full name: Adriano Luís Spadoto
- Date of birth: 19 February 1977 (age 49)
- Place of birth: Piracicaba, São Paulo, Brazil
- Height: 1.77 m (5 ft 10 in)
- Position: Defender

Senior career*
Years	Team	Apps	(Gls)
2002	Santa Cruz		
2003	Figueirense		
2004	Santa Cruz		
2005	Guarani		
2005	FC Thun		
2006	Zorya Luhansk		
2007	Paranavaí		
2007	Fortaleza		
2008	Mirassol	0	(0)
- * Club domestic league appearances and goals

Adriano Luís Spadoto (born 19 February 1977) is a Brazilian former professional football played as a defender.
