= Lukas Schenkel =

Swiss footballer (born 1984)

Personal information
- Date of birth: 1 April 1984 (age 42)
- Height: 1.83 m (6 ft 0 in)
- Position: Centre-back

Senior career*
Years	Team	Apps	(Gls)
2002–2004	FC Münsingen	43	(0)
2004–2006	FC Thun	4	(0)
2006	Young Boys U-21	21	(3)
2006–2008	FC Wil	62	(3)
2008–2011	St. Gallen	95	(4)
2011–2013	Bellinzona	56	(0)
2013–2015	FC Thun	17	(1)
2015–2018	FC Münsingen		
Total		298	(11)
- * Club domestic league appearances and goals

Lukas Schenkel (born 1 April 1984) is a Swiss former professional footballer who played as a centre-back.
