= Samuel Ojong =

Cameroonian footballer

Personal information
- Full name: Samuel Oben Ojong
- Date of birth: 6 August 1980 (age 46)
- Place of birth: Buea, Cameroon
- Height: 1.79 m (5 ft 10 in)
- Position: Striker

Senior career*
Years	Team	Apps	(Gls)
1999–2000	Rouen	26	(4)
2000–2002	Sion	41	(8)
2002–2003	SR Delémont	26	(11)
2003–2004	Neuchâtel Xamax	27	(5)
2004–2005	Thun	12	(1)
2005–2007	Gazélec Ajaccio		
2007–2008	Croix-de-Savoie		
2009	Red Star		
2009–2019	UJA Alfortville		
2010–2011	Drancy		
2011–2012	Oissel		
2012–2014	FC La Tour / Le Pâquier		
2014	AS Excelsior		
2015	US Bénédictine		
- * Club domestic league appearances and goals

Samuel Oben Ojong (born 6 August 1980) is a Cameroonian former professional footballer who played as a striker. He played on the professional level in the Swiss Super League for FC Sion, SR Delémont, Neuchâtel Xamax and FC Thun.

== Career ==
Ojong joined the Kadji Sports Academy, founded by businessman Gilbert Kadji, in 1998, before moving to Rouen in France, which was also owned by Kadji. In 2002 he moved to FC Sion in Switzerland, also led by Kadji, followed by spells with SR Delémont, Neuchâtel Xamax and FC Thun.

He signed with Corsican club Gazelec Ajaccio, playing in the Championnat National, in 2007. In his second season at the club, after relegation to the CFA, he scored 18 goals. He then spent one-and-a-half seasons with Croix-de-Savoie in Championnat National and CFA before joining Red Star.

In 2012 Ojong moved to Swiss lower league side FC La Tour / Le Pâquier.
