= Sehid Sinani =

Swiss footballer (born 1982)

Personal information
- Full name: Sehid Sinani
- Date of birth: 23 October 1982 (age 44)
- Place of birth: Laufen, Switzerland
- Height: 1.88 m (6 ft 2 in)
- Position: Defender

Youth career
- FC Laufen
- 200?–2003: FC Basel

Senior career*
Years	Team	Apps	(Gls)
2004–2007	FC Thun	26	(0)

International career
- Switzerland U-21
- * Club domestic league appearances and goals as of June 2006

Sehid Sinani (born 23 October 1982) is a retired Swiss football defender. He played for FC Thun of the Swiss Super League for three seasons between 2004 and 2007.
