= Tiago Bernardini =

Brazilian footballer

Personal information
- Full name: Tiago Henrique Bernardini Consoni
- Date of birth: 2 December 1979 (age 46)
- Place of birth: Araras, Brazil
- Height: 1.89 m (6 ft 2 in)
- Position: Centre back

Youth career
- União São João

Senior career*
| Years | Team | Apps | (Gls) |
| 1999 | União São João | | |
| 2000 | Criciúma | | |
| 2001–2002 | Internacional | | |
| 2002–2003 | Santos | | |
| 2003–2005 | União São João | | |
| 2005–2006 | Thun | 14 | (2) |
| 2006–2007 | Slovácko | 10 | (1) |
| 2007–2008 | Rheindorf Altach | 15 | (0) |
| 2008 | Coritiba | 14 | (1) |
| 2009 | Ituano | 15 | (1) |
| 2009–2010 | Spartak Trnava | 17 | (1) |
| 2010–2011 | Estoril | 13 | (1) |
| 2012 | Rio Branco-SP | 24 | (2) |
| 2013 | Velo Clube | 15 | (1) |
| 2013 | CSA | 1 | (0) |
| 2013 | Independente de Limeira | | |
| 2014–2017 | Velo Clube | 65 | (4) |
| 2014 | → Guarani (loan) | 16 | (1) |
| 2015 | → Caldense (loan) | 12 | (3) |
| 2016 | → Nacional-AM (loan) | 2 | (0) |
| 2017–2018 | Rio Branco-SP | 13 | (1) |
- * Club domestic league appearances and goals

Tiago Henrique Bernardini Consoni (born 2 December 1979) is a Brazilian former football defender.

In summer 2009, he signed a one-year contract with the Slovak side Spartak Trnava.

== Honours ==
Internacional

- Campeonato Gaúcho: 2002

Santos

- Campeonato Brasileiro Série A: 2002
