= 2000–01 in Swiss football =

Football in Switzerland
- Season: 2000–01

Men's football
- Nationalliga A: Grasshopper
- Nationalliga B: Young Boys
- 1. Liga: Overall; Concordia; Group 1: Serrières; Group 2: Concordia; Group 3: Vaduz
- Swiss Cup: Servette

Women's football
- Swiss Women's Super League: FFC Bern
- Swiss Cup: FFC Bern

The following is a summary of the 2000–01 season of competitive football in Switzerland.

== Nationalliga A ==
=== Qualification phase ===
Pos	Team	Pld	W	D	L	GF	GA	GD	Pts	Qualification
1	Lugano	22	12	6	4	33	16	+17	42	Advance to championship round halved points (rounded up) as bonus
2	St. Gallen	22	11	7	4	43	18	+25	40	Advance to championship round halved points (rounded up) as bonus
3	Grasshopper	22	11	3	8	46	25	+21	36	Advance to championship round halved points (rounded up) as bonus
4	Lausanne-Sport	22	11	2	9	37	34	+3	35	Advance to championship round halved points (rounded up) as bonus
5	Basel	22	10	4	8	42	36	+6	34	Advance to championship round halved points (rounded up) as bonus
6	Servette	22	9	6	7	34	26	+8	33	Advance to championship round halved points (rounded up) as bonus
7	Sion	22	9	5	8	27	31	−4	32	Advance to championship round halved points (rounded up) as bonus
8	Zürich	22	8	7	7	36	29	+7	31	Advance to championship round halved points (rounded up) as bonus
9	Aarau	22	6	6	10	31	43	−12	24	Continue to promotion/relegation round
10	Yverdon-Sport	22	5	6	11	27	43	−16	21	Continue to promotion/relegation round
11	Xamax	22	6	2	14	21	53	−32	20	Continue to promotion/relegation round
12	Luzern	22	5	4	13	27	50	−23	19	Continue to promotion/relegation round

Source: RSSSF
Rules for classification: 1) points; 2) goal difference; 3) number of goals scored.

=== Championship round ===
The first eight teams of the qualification phase competed in the Championship round. The teams took half of the points (rounded up to complete units) gained in the qualification as bonus with them.

Pos	Team	Pld	W	D	L	GF	GA	GD	BP	Pts	Qualification
1	Grasshopper (C)	14	8	4	2	29	14	+15	18	46	Qualification to Champions League third qualifying round
2	Lugano	14	5	5	4	24	19	+5	21	41	Qualification to Champions League second qualifying round
3	St. Gallen	14	6	2	6	23	28	−5	20	40	Qualification to UEFA Cup qualifying round
4	Basel	14	4	8	2	18	16	+2	17	37	Qualification to Intertoto Cup second round
5	Servette	14	5	5	4	26	19	+7	17	37	Qualification to UEFA Cup first round (Note: As 2000–01 Swiss Cup winner.)
6	Lausanne-Sport	14	4	3	7	15	27	−12	18	33	Qualification to Intertoto Cup first round
7	Sion	14	4	4	6	16	22	−6	16	32	
8	Zürich	14	3	3	8	12	18	−6	16	28	

Source: RSSSF
Rules for classification: 1) points; 2) goal difference; 3) number of goals scored.
(C) Champions

== Nationalliga B ==
=== Qualification phase ===
Pos	Team	Pld	W	D	L	GF	GA	GD	Pts	Qualification
1	Young Boys	22	13	6	3	42	20	+22	45	Advance to promotion/relegation NLA/LNB round
2	Wil	22	14	3	5	47	28	+19	45	Advance to promotion/relegation NLA/LNB round
3	Winterthur	22	11	8	3	41	21	+20	41	Advance to promotion/relegation NLA/LNB round
4	Bellinzona	22	11	5	6	40	27	+13	38	Advance to promotion/relegation NLA/LNB round
5	Thun	22	10	5	7	46	39	+7	35	Continue to relegation round NLB/1. Liga halved points (rounded up) as bonus
6	Delémont	22	9	4	9	43	39	+4	31	Continue to relegation round NLB/1. Liga halved points (rounded up) as bonus
7	Kriens	22	7	4	11	29	37	−8	25	Continue to relegation round NLB/1. Liga halved points (rounded up) as bonus
8	Locarno	22	6	6	10	28	41	−13	24	Continue to relegation round NLB/1. Liga halved points (rounded up) as bonus
9	Wangen b.O.	22	5	7	10	26	38	−12	22	Continue to relegation round NLB/1. Liga halved points (rounded up) as bonus
10	Baden	22	5	5	12	23	40	−17	20	Continue to relegation round NLB/1. Liga halved points (rounded up) as bonus
11	Étoile Carouge	22	3	9	10	25	36	−11	18	Continue to relegation round NLB/1. Liga halved points (rounded up) as bonus
12	Solothurn	22	4	6	12	16	40	−24	18	Continue to relegation round NLB/1. Liga halved points (rounded up) as bonus

Source: RSSSF
Rules for classification: 1) points; 2) goal difference; 3) number of goals scored.

=== Promotion/relegation group NLA/NLB ===
The teams in the ninth to twelfth positions in Nationalliga A competed with the top four teams of Nationalliga B in a Nationalliga A/B promotion/relegation round.

Pos	Team	Pld	W	D	L	GF	GA	GD	Pts	Promotion or relegation
1	Neuchâtel Xamax	14	7	6	1	24	16	+8	27	Remain in NLA
2	Aarau	14	7	3	4	23	15	+8	24	Remain in NLA
3	Luzern	14	7	3	4	24	18	+6	24	Remain in NLA
4	Young Boys	14	7	3	4	17	14	+3	24	Promoted to NLA
5	Yverdon-Sport	14	4	7	3	23	20	+3	19	Relegated to NLB
6	Winterthur	14	5	2	7	18	21	−3	17	Remain in NLB
7	Wil	14	2	5	7	17	22	−5	11	Remain in NLB
8	Bellinzona	14	1	3	10	8	28	−20	6	Remain in NLB

Source: RSSSF
Rules for classification: 1) points; 2) goal difference; 3) number of goals scored.

=== Relegation group NLB/1. Liga ===
The last eight teams of the qualification phase competed in the relegation group against relegation to the 1. Liga. The teams took half of the points (rounded up to complete units) gained in the qualification as bonus with them.

Pos	Team	Pld	W	D	L	GF	GA	GD	BP	Pts	Relegation
1	Delémont	14	6	5	3	24	20	+4	16	39	Remain in NLB
2	Thun	14	5	4	5	24	21	+3	18	37	Remain in NLB
3	Kriens	14	5	5	4	12	13	−1	13	33	Remain in NLB
4	Baden	14	6	4	4	31	22	+9	10	32	Remain in NLB
5	Locarno	14	5	4	5	17	24	−7	12	31	Remain in NLB
6	Étoile Carouge	14	3	10	1	16	12	+4	9	28	Remain in NLB
7	Wangen b.O.	14	5	1	8	24	32	−8	11	27	Relegated to 1. Liga
8	Solothurn	14	1	7	6	22	26	−4	9	19	Relegated to 1. Liga

Source: RSSSF
Rules for classification: 1) points; 2) goal difference; 3) number of goals scored.

== 1. Liga ==
=== Group 1 ===
Pos	Team	Pld	W	D	L	GF	GA	GD	Pts	Qualification or relegation
1	FC Serrières	30	16	10	4	45	27	+18	58	Play-off to Challenge League
2	FC Stade Lausanne Ouchy	30	16	7	7	50	29	+21	55	Play-off to Challenge League
3	Servette U-21	30	16	6	8	54	33	+21	54	
4	FC Colombier	30	14	9	7	43	37	+6	51	
5	CS Chênois	30	12	11	7	60	44	+16	47	
6	Vevey Sports	30	11	10	9	56	39	+17	43	
7	FC Bex	30	11	8	11	51	50	+1	41	
8	FC Meyrin	30	11	8	11	38	40	−2	41	
9	FC La Chaux-de-Fonds	30	11	7	12	44	53	−9	40	
10	FC Naters	30	10	9	11	46	51	−5	39	
11	Lausanne-Sport U-21	30	10	4	16	43	48	−5	34	
12	Grand-Lancy FC	30	8	10	12	38	54	−16	34	
13	FC Echallens	30	9	5	16	36	44	−8	32	
14	FC Stade Nyonnais	30	8	8	14	48	63	−15	32	
15	FC Martigny-Sports	30	8	7	15	43	50	−7	31	Relegation to 2. Liga Interregional
16	US Terre Sainte	30	6	7	17	31	64	−33	25	Relegation to 2. Liga Interregional

Source: Erste Liga official website
Rules for classification: 1) Points; 2) Goal difference within the league or play-off for qualifiers.

=== Group 2 ===
Pos	Team	Pld	W	D	L	GF	GA	GD	Pts	Qualification or relegation
1	FC Concordia Basel	30	18	8	4	58	30	+28	62	Play-off to Challenge League
2	FC Schaffhausen	30	17	9	4	55	26	+29	60	Play-off to Challenge League
3	SC Young Fellows Juventus	30	16	7	7	56	35	+21	55	
4	FC Altstetten	30	15	8	7	48	31	+17	53	
5	FC Grenchen	30	12	11	7	60	34	+26	47	
6	FC Red Star Zürich	30	13	7	10	41	38	+3	46	
7	FC Fribourg	30	10	10	10	47	39	+8	40	
8	FC Münsingen	30	8	12	10	36	43	−7	36	
9	FC Biel-Bienne	30	9	8	13	41	58	−17	35	
10	FC Wohlen	30	9	7	14	50	48	+2	34	
11	FC Schwamendingen	30	9	7	14	45	59	−14	34	
12	FC Bulle	30	9	5	16	41	64	−23	32	
13	SV Schaffhausen	30	7	10	13	36	61	−25	31	
14	Grasshopper Club U-21	30	7	9	14	44	48	−4	30	
15	FC Horgen	30	7	8	15	42	57	−15	29	Relegation to 2. Liga Interregional
16	SV Muttenz	30	7	8	15	41	70	−29	29	Relegation to 2. Liga Interregional

Source: Erste Liga official website
Rules for classification: 1) Points; 2) Goal difference within the league, or play-off for qualifiers.

=== Group 3 ===
Pos	Team	Pld	W	D	L	GF	GA	GD	Pts	Qualification or relegation
1	FC Vaduz	30	19	7	4	78	31	+47	64	Play-off to Challenge League
2	FC Schötz	30	17	7	6	61	32	+29	58	Play-off to Challenge League
3	St. Gallen U-21	30	15	9	6	54	34	+20	54	
4	Zug 94	30	15	8	7	50	29	+21	53	
5	FC Gossau	30	14	6	10	51	55	−4	48	
6	FC Malcantone Agno	30	12	8	10	41	30	+11	44	
7	SC Buochs	30	14	1	15	37	45	−8	43	
8	FC Tuggen	30	11	8	11	41	43	−2	41	
9	FC Kreuzlingen	30	8	14	8	37	35	+2	38	
10	FC Chiasso	30	8	13	9	27	32	−5	37	
11	FC Rapperswil-Jona	30	9	8	13	41	48	−7	35	
12	FC Freienbach	30	9	8	13	43	57	−14	35	
13	FC Rorschach	30	7	13	10	30	43	−13	34	
14	FC Mendrisio	30	6	12	12	35	43	−8	30	
15	FC Widnau	30	6	7	17	41	67	−26	25	Relegation to 2. Liga Interregional
16	FC Sursee	30	5	1	24	34	77	−43	16	Relegation to 2. Liga Interregional

Source: Erste Liga official website
Rules for classification: 1) Points; 2) Goal difference within the league, or play-off for qualifiers.

=== Promotion play-off ===
The three group winners and the runners-up contested this play-off for the two promotion slots.

Qualification round

Team 1	Score	Team 2
Stade Lausanne Ouchy	1–2	Vaduz
Vaduz	3–3	Stade Lausanne Ouchy

Vaduz win 5–4 on aggregate and continue to the finals.

Team 1	Score	Team 2
Schötz	1–0	Concordia
Concordia	3–0	Schötz

Concordia win 3–1 on aggregate and continue to the finals.

Team 1	Score	Team 2
Schaffhausen	3–2	Serrières
Serrières	2–1	Schaffhausen

4–4 on aggregate, Serrières win on away goals and continue to the finals.

Final round

Team 1	Score	Team 2
Serrières	1–3	Vaduz
Vaduz	0–1	Concordia
Concordia	0–0	Serrières

==== Final table ====
Pos	Team	Pld	W	D	L	GF	GA	GD	Pts	Qualification or relegation
1	FC Concordia Basel	2	1	1	0	1	0	+1	4	Promotion to Challenge League
2	FC Vaduz	2	1	0	1	3	2	+1	3	Promotion to Challenge League
3	FC Serrières	2	0	1	1	1	3	−2	1	

Source: Erste Liga official website
Rules for classification: 1) Points; 2) Goal difference; 3) Goals scored; 4) Head-to-head points; 5) Away goals scored; 6) Play-off.

== Swiss Cup ==
The four winners of the quarter-finals played in the semi-finals. The winners of the first drawn semi-final is considered as home team in the final.

3 May 2001
20:15
First semi-final

Servette	1–0	St. Gallen
Frei 77'	SFV summary

Charmilles Stadium, Geneva
Attendance: 4,816
Referee: (Switzerland) Andreas Schluchter (Schönenbuch)

3 May 2001
19:30
Second semi-final

Lausanne-Sport	0–0 (a.e.t.)	Yverdon-Sport
	SFV summary
Penalties
Lombardo (penalty scored); Christ (penalty scored); Kuźba (penalty scored); Puce (penalty missed); Thiaw (penalty missed); Simon (penalty missed)	3–4	(penalty missed) Peco; (penalty scored) Andreoli; (penalty scored) Jenny; (penalty scored) Rochat; (penalty missed) Cavalo; (penalty scored) Renatus

Olympique de la Pontaise, Lausanne
Attendance: 3,150
Referee: (Switzerland) Philippe Leuba (Chexbres)

Final

10 June 2001
15:00

Servette	3 – 0	Yverdon-Sport
Lonfat 11'; Petrov 29'; Frei 55'	Report

St. Jakob-Park, Basel
Attendance: 20,000
Referee: (Switzerland) Markus Nobs (Wohlen bei Bern)

== Swiss Clubs in Europe ==
- St. Gallen as 1999–2000 Nationalliga A champions: Champions League third qualifying round
- Lausanne-Sport as runners-up: UEFA Cup qualifying round
- Basel as third placed team: UEFA Cup qualifying round
- Luzern: Intertoto Cup first round
- Xamax: Intertoto Cup first round
- Zürich as 1999–2000 Swiss Cup winners: UEFA Cup first round
- Vaduz as 1999–2000 Liechtenstein Cup winners: UEFA Cup qualifying round

=== St. Gallen ===
==== Champions League ====
===== Third qualifying round =====
9 August 2000 First leg	St. Gallen (Switzerland)	1–2	(Turkey) Galatasaray	Hardturm, Zürich (Note: St. Gallen played their home match at Hardturm stadium in Zürich, instead of their regular venue Espenmoos stadium in St. Gallen.)
20:15 (CET)	Amoah 14'	Report	Jardel 39', 78'	Attendance: 16,066; Referee: Manuel Mejuto González (Spain)

22 August 2000 Second leg	Galatasaray (Turkey)	2–2	(Switzerland) St. Gallen	Ali Sami Yen Stadium, Istanbul
20:45 (CET)	Zellweger 22' (o.g.); Jardel 28' (pen.)	Report	Gane 30'; Amoah 85'	Attendance: 16,337; Referee: Knud Erik Fisker (Denmark)

Galatasaray won 4–3 on aggregate.

==== UEFA Cup ====
===== First round =====
14 September 2000 First leg	Chelsea (England)	1–0	(Switzerland) St. Gallen	Stamford Bridge, London
20:45	Panucci 25'	Report		Attendance: 18,196; Referee: Victor José Esquinas Torres (Spain)

28 September 2000 Second leg	St. Gallen (Switzerland)	2–0	(England) Chelsea	Hardturm, Zürich
20:45	Müller 19'; Amoah 35'	Report		Attendance: 15,620; Referee: Pascal Garibian (France)

St. Gallen won 2–1 on aggregate.

===== Second round =====
26 October 2000 First leg	Club Brugge (Belgium)	2–1	(Switzerland) St. Gallen	Jan Breydel Stadium, Bruges
20:30	Lembi 54' (pen.); Vermant 77' (pen.)	Report UEFA Report	Amoah 29'	Attendance: 10,283; Referee: Ivan Dobrinov (Bulgaria)

9 November 2000 Second leg	St. Gallen (Switzerland)	1–1	(Belgium) Club Brugge	Hardturm, Zürich
20:00	Amoah 19'	Report UEFA Report	Mendoza 90'	Attendance: 14,500; Referee: Fiorenzo Treossi (Italy)

Club Brugge win 3–2 on aggregate

=== Lausanne-Sport ===
==== UEFA Cup ====
===== Qualifying round =====
10 August 2000 First leg	Lausanne (Switzerland)	1–0	(Republic of Ireland) Cork City	Stade Olympique de la Pontaise, Lausanne
19:30	Horjak 89'	Report		Attendance: 3,800; Referee: Anton Genov (Bulgaria)

24 August 2000 Second leg	Cork City (Republic of Ireland)	0–1	(Switzerland) Lausanne	Turners Cross, Cork
19:00		Report	Gomes 62'	Attendance: 6,000; Referee: Petteri Kari (Iceland)

Lausanne win 2–0 on aggregate.

===== First round =====
14 September 2000 First leg	Lausanne (Switzerland)	3–2	(Russia) Torpedo Moscow	Stade Olympique de la Pontaise, Lausanne
18:30	Kuźba 22', 48'; Mazzoni 51'	Report	Gashkin 14'; Litvinov 33'	Attendance: 3,100; Referee: Tomasz Mikulski (Poland)

28 September 2000 Second leg	Torpedo Moscow (Russia)	0–2	(Switzerland) Lausanne	Luzhniki Stadium, Moscow
17;30		Report	Kuźba 29'; Puce 62'	Attendance: 3,500; Referee: Alan Snoddy (Northern Ireland)

Lausanne won 5–2 on aggregate.

===== Second round =====
26 October 2000 First leg	Lausanne (Switzerland)	1–0	(Netherlands) Ajax	Stade Olympique de la Pontaise, Lausanne
19:00	Mazzoni 37'	Report UEFA; Report	Wamberto (red card) 79'	Attendance: 11,150; Referee: Željko Širić (Croatia)

9 November 2000 Second leg	Ajax (Netherlands)	2–2	(Switzerland) Lausanne	Amsterdam Arena, Amsterdam
20;45	Arveladze 17'; Van der Gun 79'	Report UEFA; Report	Mazzoni 38'; Kuźba 77' (pen.)	Attendance: 27,500; Referee: Víctor José Esquinas Torres (Spain)

Lausanne win 3–2 on aggregate

===== Third round =====
23 November 2000 First leg	Nantes (France)	4–3	(Switzerland) Lausanne	Stade de la Beaujoire, Nantes
1915	Moldovan 18'; Monterrubio 43'; Puce 73'; Gillet 86'	Report UEFA; Report	Kuźba 41' (pen.), 70'; Mazzoni 53'	Attendance: 18,000; Referee: Atanas Uzunov (Bulgaria)

7 December 2000 Second leg	Lausanne (Switzerland)	1–3	(France) Nantes	Stade Olympique de la Pontaise, Lausanne
20:15	Lombardo 49'	Report UEFA; Report	Ziani 24'; Moldovan 59'; Carrière 88'	Attendance: 14,200; Referee: Roelof Luinge (Netherlands)

Nantes win 7–4 on aggregate.

=== Basel ===
==== UEFA Cup ====
===== Qualifying round =====
10 August 2000 First leg	Folgore (San Marino)	1 – 5	(Switzerland) Basel	Stadio Olimpico, Serravalle
20:00	Rossi (yellow card) 55'; S. Bianchi (yellow card) 73'; Zanotti 79' (1:5)	Uefa summary FCB summary	13' (0:1) Tchouga; 22' (0:2) Tchouga; 40' Muff; 48' (0:4) Magro; 77' (0:5) Magro	Attendance: 1,584; Referee: José Luis Mengual Prades (Andorra)

24 August 2000 Return leg	Basel (Switzerland)	7 – 0 (12 – 1 agg.)	(San Marino) Folgore	Hardturm, Zürich
20:00	Muff 7' (1:0); Magro 19' (2:0); Magro 21' (3:0); Cantaluppi 30' (4:0); Tholot 39' (5:0); Koumantarakis 81' (6:0); Tholot 85' (7:0)	UEFA summary FCB summary	(yellow card) 40' Zanotti; (yellow card) 81' Della Torre	Attendance: 2,113; Referee: David Malcolm (Northern Ireland)

Basel win 12-1 on aggregate

===== First round =====
12 September 2000 First leg	Basel (Switzerland)	3 – 2	(Norway) Brann	Hardturm, Zürich
18:00	Magro 7' (1:0); Magro (yellow card) 26'; Tchouga 53' (2:1); Kreuzer 86' (pen. 3:2)	UEFA summary FCB summary	(yellow card) 37' Ylönen; 47' (1:1) Ludvigsen; (yellow card) 71' Karadas; 72' (2:2) Helstad	Attendance: 3,250; Referee: Igor Ishchenko (Ukraine)

28 September 2000 Return leg	Brann (Norway)	4 – 4 (6 – 7 agg.)	(Switzerland) Basel	Brann Stadion, Bergen
19:30	Karadas 4' (1:0); Brendesæter 9' (2:0); Terehhov 31' (3:1); Karadas 40' (4:1); Brendesæter (yellow card) 61'	UEFA summary FCB summary	20' (2:1) Tchouga; (yellow card) 40' Cantaluppi; 59' (o.g. 4:2) Wassberg; 61' (pen. 4:3) Kreuzer; (yellow card) 75' Varela; 90' (4:4) Muff	Attendance: 4,176; Referee: Dani Koren (Israel)

Basel won 7–6 on aggregate.

===== Second round =====
26 October 2000 First leg	Basel (Switzerland)	1 – 2	(Netherlands) Feyenoord	Hardturm, Zürich
21:00	Tchouga (yellow card) 13'; Varela (yellow card) 22'; Tchouga 62' (1:1)	UEFA summary FCB summary	60' (0:1) Kalou; (yellow card) 70' Paauwe; 84' (1:2) Bosvelt	Attendance: 9,700; Referee: John Rowbotham (Scotland)

9 November 2000 Return leg	Feyenoord (Netherlands)	1 – 0 (3 – 1 agg.)	(Switzerland) Basel	De Kuip, Rotterdam
20:00	Kalou 3' (1:0)	UEFA summary FCB summary	(yellow card) 79' Muff	Attendance: 33,000; Referee: Yuri Baskakov (Russia)

Feyenoord win 3–1 on aggregate

=== Luzern ===
==== Intertoto Cup ====
===== First round =====
18 June 2000 First leg	Leiftur (Iceland)	2–2	(Switzerland) Luzern	Ólafsfjarðarvöllur, Ólafsfjörður
	Rasmussen 32'; Barreto 55'		Gian 72'; Frei 79'	Attendance: 300; Referee: Oleg Timofeev (Estonia)

24 June 2000 Second leg	Luzern (Switzerland)	4–4	(Iceland) Leiftur	Stadion Allmend, Lucerne
	Frei 52'; Lipawsky 56'; Ohrel 57', 88'		Gíslason 39'; Petersen 64'; Magnússon 85'; Helgason 90'	Attendance: 1,327; Referee: Karen Nalbandyan (Armenia)

6–6 on aggregate, Leiftur won on away goals rule.

=== Xamax ===
==== Intertoto Cup ====
===== First round =====
18 June 2000 First leg	MyPa (Finland)	1–2	(Switzerland) Neuchâtel Xamax	Anjalankosken Jalkapallostadion, Anjalankoski
	Väisänen 30'		Perret 60'; Bilibani 84'	Attendance: 1,203; Referee: Karel Vidlák (Czech Republic)

25 June 2000 Second leg	Neuchâtel Xamax (Switzerland)	3–3	(Finland) MyPa	Stade de la Maladière, Neuchâtel
	Koch 2', 4'; Bilibani 81'		Lindberg 48', 70'; Puhakainen 83'	Attendance: 500; Referee: Uriah Rennie (England)

Neuchâtel Xamax won 5–4 on aggregate.

===== Second round =====
1 July 2000 First leg	Neuchâtel Xamax (Switzerland)	1–6	(Germany) Stuttgart	Stade de la Maladière, Neuchâtel
	Simo 69' (pen.)		Hosny 6', 59'; Schneider 15'; Pinto 20'; Soldo 76' (pen.); Amanatidis 90'	Attendance: 1,300; Referee: Serguei Goussev (Russia)

9 July 2000 Second leg	Stuttgart (Germany)	4–1	(Switzerland) Neuchâtel Xamax	Wildparkstadion, Karlsruhe
	Seitz 36', 51', 52'; Amanatidis 90'		Caracciolo 87'	Attendance: 2,000; Referee: Domenico Messina (Italy)

Stuttgart won 10–2 on aggregate.

=== Zürich ===
==== UEFA Cup ====
===== First round =====
14 September 2000 First leg	Zürich (Switzerland)	1–2	(Belgium) Genk	Letzigrund, Zürich
19:30	Bartlett 64'	Report	Paas 52'; Ban 90'	Attendance: 4,561; Referee: Bruno Coué (France)

28 September 2000 Second leg	Genk (Belgium)	2–0	(Switzerland) Zürich	Cristal Arena, Genk
20:30	Daerden 31'; Hendrikx 90'	Report		Attendance: 8,500; Referee: Vasyl Melnychuk (Ukraine)

Genk won 4–1 on aggregate.

=== Vaduz ===
==== UEFA Cup ====
===== Qualifying round =====
10 August 2000 First leg	Amica Wronki (Poland)	3–0	(Liechtenstein) Vaduz	Stadion Amica, Wronki
20:00	Kryszałowicz 34'; Dawidowski 78'; Król 89'	Report		Attendance: 2,000; Referee: Gennady Yakubovsky (Belarus)

24 August 2000 Second leg	Vaduz (Liechtenstein)	3–3	(Poland) Amica Wronki	Rheinpark Stadion, Vaduz
19:30	Wegmann 8'; Šlekys 43'; Polverino 75'	Report	Andraszak 14'; Król 23'; Zieńczuk 83'	Attendance: 550; Referee: Sead Kulović (Bosnia and Herzegovina)

Amica Wronki win 6–3 on aggregate.

== Sources ==
- Switzerland 2000–01 at RSSSF
- 1. Liga season 2000–01 at the official website
- Switzerland Cup 2000–01 at RSSSF
- Cup finals at Fussball-Schweiz
- UEFA Intertoto Cup 2000 at RSSSF
- Josef Zindel (2018). FC Basel 1893. Die ersten 125 Jahre (in German). Basel: Friedrich Reinhardt Verlag. ISBN 978-3-7245-2305-5.

Preceded by 1999–2000	Seasons in Swiss football	Succeeded by 2001–02
