= 2000–01 FC Basel season =

FC Basel
2000–01 season
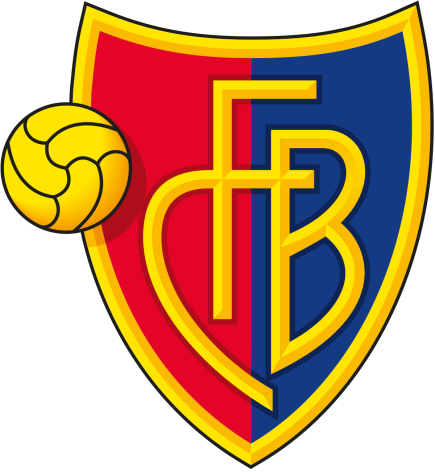
- Club president: René C. Jäggi
- Head coach: Christian Gross
- Ground: Stadion Schützenmatte until 10 December 2000; St. Jakob-Park from 15 March 2001
- NLA Qualification round: 5th of 12
- Championship round: 4th of 8
- Swiss Cup: Quarterfinal
- 2000–01 UEFA Cup: Round 2
- Top goalscorer: League: Jean-Michel Tchouga (13); All: Jean-Michel Tchouga (20)
- Highest home attendance: 33,433; Lausanne-Sport (15.03.2001); St. Gallen (14.04.2001); Grasshopper Club (15.05.2001)
- Average home league attendance: 15,152

The 2000–01 Fussball Club Basel 1893 season was their 107th season since the club's foundation on 15 November 1893. Following their promotion in the 1993–94 season this was their seventh consecutive season in the highest tier of Swiss football. René C. Jäggi was the club's chairman for the fifth consecutive season.

== Overview ==
FC Basel played their home games in the alternate Stadion Schützenmatte, which is situated in the west of the city, about one and a half kilometers from the city centre. This was their temporary home, because the old St. Jakob Stadium was demolished and the new stadium was built on the same site, situated in the south-east of the city, neighboring the municipalities of Muttenz and Münchenstein. The construction of the new stadium took a little more than two years and was to be opened in March 2001. The new stadium, the St. Jakob-Park, was to be an all seater, the old stadium had standing places on three sides.

Club president prolonged the contract with head coach Christian Gross and he was first team trainer for the second season. Still forming his team, Basel made a number of signings before the season started. Goalkeeper Miroslav König, players André Muff and Hakan Yakin were signed from Grasshopper Club. Two strikers joined to strengthen the attack, Hervé Tum from Sion and Jean-Michel Tchouga from Yverdon-Sports. Mid-fielder Ivan Ergic joined from Juventus and winger Carlos Varela was loaned in from Servette.

In the other direction Luís Calapes moved to Xamax, Didier Tholot and Thomas Häberli moved to Young Boys and Agent Sawu to Wil. Further, Pascal Zuberbühler signed on a one-year loan to Bayer Leverkusen, Marco Tschopp on a one-year loan to Xamax and Edmond N'Tiamoah on a six-month loan to SR Delémont.

== The Campaign ==
=== Friendly games ===
Basel entered the Sempione Cup, which was played in Balsthal. The first match against the Brazilian team Ituano FC was won and the second match against Turkish team Besiktas Istanbul ended in a draw. Basel were placed second in the final standing.

=== Domestic League ===
The Qualification Round to the League season 2000–01 was contested by twelve teams. The first eight teams of the regular season (or Qualification) then competed in the Championship Playoff Round. The regular season started on 15 July and ended on 10 December. The championship play-offs began on 25 February 2001 and ended on 26 May. The team's aim was to end the qualification round in the top four table and in the championship to reach the 2001–02 UEFA Cup. Basel started the regular season with three wins and three defeats, but then became somewhat more consistent, being defeated just once in the following 12 matches. The end of the first half of the regular season ended on a disappointing note as the team lost four of the last five games and slipped to fifth position in the league table.

Basel were able to play the games of the Championship Group in the new stadium, the St. Jakob-Park opened on 15 March 2001. It was sold out with 33,433 spectators on three occasions, Lausanne-Sport (15.03.2001), St. Gallen (14.04.2001) and Grasshopper Club (15.05.2001) The team were more consistent in the championship, they were only beaten twice. But they only won four matches (eight draws), goal scoring was very rare. Basel ended the season in fourth position in the league table, thus qualifying for the 2001 UEFA Intertoto Cup.

=== Domestic Cup ===
The Swiss Cup started for Basel in the Round of 32 on 18 February 2001. Basel defeated lower class Etoile Carouge, but only after a penalty shoot out. In the next round they were drawn against and beat lower classed Bellinzona, but only narrowly. In the quarterfinals Basel were defeated by Lausanne-Sport, again after another penalty shoot out.

=== Europe ===
Basel were qualified for the UEFA Cup and in the qualifying round they beat Folgore 12–1 on aggregate. In the first round they beat Brann Bergen with an aggregate score of 7–6. In the second round Basel were tied against Feyenoord. Feyenoord won both matches and so the European season came to an end for Basel before Christmas.

== Players ==
=== First team squad ===
The following is the list of the Basel first team squad. It includes all players that were in the squad the day the season started on 15 July 2000 but subsequently left the club after that date and it includes all players that transferred in during the season.

Note: Flags indicate national team as defined under FIFA eligibility rules; some limited exceptions apply. Players may hold more than one non-FIFA nationality.

No.	Pos.	Nation	Player
1	GK	SVK	Miroslav König
1	GK	SUI	Pascal Zuberbühler
2	DF	SUI	Massimo Ceccaroni
3	DF	SUI	Philippe Cravero
4	DF	SUI	Alexandre Quennoz
5	DF	GER	Oliver Kreuzer
6	MF	SUI	Benjamin Huggel
7	FW	CMR	Jean-Michel Tchouga
8	MF	ESP	Carlos Varela
9	FW	RSA	George Koumantarakis
10	MF	SUI	Didier Tholot
11	FW	TUR	Cetin Güner
12	DF	SUI	Sébastien Barberis

No.	Pos.	Nation	Player
14	FW	SUI	Nenad Savić
16	MF	TOG	Yao Aziawonou
17	MF	SUI	Mario Cantaluppi
18	GK	SUI	Romain Crevoisier
19	DF	SUI	André Muff
20	DF	SUI	Ivan Knez
21	MF	ITA	Feliciano Magro
22	DF	YUG	Ivan Ergic
23	DF	SUI	Murat Yakin
24	DF	SUI	Thierry Ebe
25	GK	CIV	Slaven Matan
26	FW	FRA	Edmond N'Tiamoah
28	MF	SUI	Hakan Yakin
29	FW	CMR	Hervé Tum

=== Transfers in ===
Note: Flags indicate national team as defined under FIFA eligibility rules; some limited exceptions apply. Players may hold more than one non-FIFA nationality.

No.	Pos.	Nation	Player
1	GK	SVK	Miroslav König (from Grasshopper Club)
7	FW	CMR	Jean-Michel Tchouga (from Yverdon-Sports)
8	MF	ESP	Carlos Varela (on loan from Servette)
16	MF	TOG	Yao Aziawonou (from Sion)
18	GK	SUI	Romain Crevoisier (from SC Kriens)
19	DF	SUI	André Muff (from Grasshopper Club)

No.	Pos.	Nation	Player
21	MF	ITA	Feliciano Magro (on loan from Udinese)
22	DF	YUG	Ivan Ergic (from Juventus)
23	DF	SUI	Murat Yakin (from 1. FC Kaiserslautern)
24	DF	SUI	Thierry Ebe (on loan from Etoile Carouge)
26	FW	FRA	Edmond N'Tiamoah (from youth team)
28	MF	SUI	Hakan Yakin (from Grasshopper Club)
29	FW	CMR	Hervé Tum (from Sion)

=== Transfers out ===
Note: Flags indicate national team as defined under FIFA eligibility rules; some limited exceptions apply. Players may hold more than one non-FIFA nationality.

No.	Pos.	Nation	Player
1	GK	SUI	Pascal Zuberbühler (loan to Bayer Leverkusen)
3	DF	SUI	Luís Calapes (to Xamax)
8	MF	SUI	Raphael Kehrli (to Luzern)
10	MF	SUI	Didier Tholot (to Young Boys)
11	FW	TUR	Cetin Güner (to Gaziantepspor)
13	DF	SUI	Marco Tschopp (one year loan to Xamax)
18	GK	SUI	Oliver Stöckli (retired)

No.	Pos.	Nation	Player
24	DF	SUI	Thomas Häberli (to Young Boys)
26	FW	GHA	Edmond N'Tiamoah (loan to SR Delémont)
27	FW	ZIM	Agent Sawu (to Wil)
29	FW	SUI	Urs Güntensperger (end of career, to FC Horgen)
—	MF	RUS	Aleksandr Rytchkov (end of contract, free agent)
—	FW	SUI	Deniz Mendi (end of contract to Young Boys)
—	FW	FRA	Olivier Boumelaha (to St. Gallen)

== Results ==
Legend

Win Draw Loss Postponed

=== Friendly matches ===
==== Pre- and mid-season ====
28 June 2000 Pre-season	Basel (Switzerland)	0–1	(Bulgaria) Levski Sofia	Im Nau, Laufen
19:00		FCB summary	31' (0:1) Ivanov	Attendance: 200; Referee: (Switzerland) Dieter Schoch (Attiswil)
Note: FCB without Zuberbühler, Cravero, and Cantaluppi (all absent). Rolf Fringer (new head-coach with Aarau) and Petar Alexandrov (ex-player FCA) among the spectators.

1 July 2000 Pre-season	Winterthur (Switzerland)	0–0	(Switzerland) Basel	Schützenwiese, Winterthur
18:00		FCB summary	(yellow card) 69' Savić	Attendance: 600; Referee: (Switzerland) Büchel
Note: Winterthur ohne Cerrone, Huber, Stocklasa, Ritter, Weiler, Ramsauer und Belarbi (alle verletzt). Basel ohne Koumantarakis (abwesend), Cantaluppi (leichte Sehnenverletzung). 20. Knez befreit Schuss Calos von der Linie.

2 July 2000 Pre-season	Wangen bei Olten (Switzerland)	0–5	(Switzerland) Basel	Chrüzmat, Wangen bei Olten
16:00		FCB summary	4' (0:1) Tchouga; 28' (0:2) Tchouga; 41' (0:3) Muff; 49' (0:4) Huggel; 76' (0:5) N'Tiamoah	Attendance: 1,550; Referee: (Switzerland) René Rogalla (Wallisellen)
Note: FCB without Zuberbühler, Kreuzer, Savic, Cantaluppi, Magro, and Koumantarakis (all rested). After the break FCB with a tactical change, Ceccaroni played as left-back, Barberis on the right, Aziawonou at centre-back, and Perez in central midfield. 53rd minute: a free kick from Tholot hit the crossbar. 69th minute: a shot from N'Tiamoah hit the crossbar. Corners: 3–5 (1–3).

6 July 2000 Semi-final; Sempione-Cup	Basel (Switzerland)	2–1	(Brazil) Ituano	Moos, Balsthal
20:00	Tchouga 24' (1:0); Tchouga 33' (2:1); Savić (yellow card) 73'	FCB summary	26' (1:1) Valdomiro; (yellow card) 32' Careca	Attendance: 1,900; Referee: (Switzerland) Markus Nobs (Wohlen bei Bern)
Note: The Sempione Cup was a club tournament played in summer at Sportanlage Moos, Balsthal, during the years 1987 to 2004. FCB without Güner (injured). 37th minute: Cantaluppi substituted due to muscle problems.

8 July 2000 Final; Sempione-Cup	Basel (Switzerland)	2–2	(Turkey) Besiktas Istanbul	Moos, Balsthal
19:30	Kreuzer 22' (pen. 1:0); Barberis 86' (2:2)	FCB summary	40' (1:1) Karhan; 53' (1:2) Mehmet; (yellow card) 83' Eren	Attendance: 3,200; Referee: (Liechtenstein) Roland Beck (Triesenberg)
Note: The Sempione Cup was a club tournament played in summer at Sportanlage Moos, Balsthal, during the years 1987 to 2004. FCB without Cantaluppi (thigh problems) and Magro (adductor problems). After the break tactical change, Barberis in central midfield, Perez on the left of midfield. 62nd minute: a shot from Mehmet hit the post.

26 July 2000 Mid-season	Basel (Switzerland)	1–2	(Turkey) Galatasaray	Stadion FC Solothurn, Solothurn
19:30	Tholot 45' (1:0)	FCB summary	(yellow card) 28' Emre B 87' (1:1) Ökan; 90+5' (1:2) Faruk	Attendance: 3,400; Referee: (Switzerland) Carlo Bertolini (Vira-Gambarogno)
Note: FCB without Koumantarakis (injured), Cantaluppi, Huggel (niggling injury), and Savic (wisdom tooth problems). Galatasaray without Hagi, Popescu, and Ümit (all injured). 64th minute, a shot from Tchouga against the post. Good conditions, fair match, well-organized event.

==== Winter break and mid-season ====
17 January 2001 Winter break	Borussia Dortmund (Germany)	4–1	(Switzerland) Basel	Westfalenstadion, Dortmund
19:00	Kohler 29' (1:0); Reina 51' (2:1); Reina 55' (3:1); Krontiris 82' (4:1)	FCB summary	34' (1:1) Magro	Attendance: 4,000; Referee: (Germany) Detlef Scheppe (Wenden)
Note: Dortmund without Reuter (injured). FCB without Aziawonou (injured), Tholot and Crevoisier (both did not travel due to coaching courses). A shot from Ikpeba bounced off the post, a shot from Nerlinger hit the crossbar.

19 January 2001 Winter break	VfL Bochum (Germany)	5–2	(Switzerland) Basel	Ruhrstadion, Bochum
19:00	Christiansen 3' (1:0); Baştürk 10' (2:0); Christiansen 22' (3:0); Drinčić 40' (pen. 4:0); Milinović (yellow card) 61'; Freier 88' (5:2)	FCB summary	(yellow card) 57' Barberis; 69' (4:1); 85' (o.g. 4:2) Mamić	Attendance: 1,864; Referee: (Germany) Markus Weber
Note: FCB without Crevoisier and Tholot (coaching course). Van Dujinhoven and Knez left the game after a collision prior to the 4–2 goal.

21 July 2001 Winter break	Bayer 04 Leverkusen (Germany)	2–1	(Switzerland) Basel	BayArena, Leverkusen
15:30	Berbatov 46' (1:1); Kirsten 48' (2:1); Neuendorf (yellow card) 72'	FCB summary	45' (0:1) Tum	Attendance: 8,000; Referee: (Germany) Rainer Werthmann
Note: Leverkusen without Kovac (injured) and Zuberbühler (in the stands; playing against Slovakia on Tuesday, König therefore stayed in Leverkusen). Basel without Crevoisier, Tholot (coaching courses), and Knez (injured). Kreuzer left the game with knee problems. Yakin left the game after a blow to the knee. For Basel, Magro played in left midfield after the break.

29 January 2001 Training camp	Oman	1–4	(Switzerland) Basel	Sultan Qaboos Sports Complex, Muscat, Oman
	75' (1:3)	FCB summary	13' (0:1) Tchouga; 41' (0:2) Tchouga; 70' (pen. 0:3) Kreuzer; 80' (1:4) Varela	Attendance: 400
Note: FCB were without Ceccaroni, Koumantarakis, Aziawonou, Cantaluppi, and Muff (all injured or rested), as well as Yakin (weakened after a mild bout of flu). Crevoisier and Knez were the only Basel players on the bench.

2 February 2001 Training camp	Anzhi Makhachkala (Russia)	1–3	(Switzerland) Basel	Sultan Qaboos Sports Complex, Muscat, Oman
	Bogatiev 62' (1:0); Schitkow (red card) 72'	FCB summary	72' (1:1) Barberis; 77' (1:2) Tum; 90' (1:3) Ergic	Attendance: 25; Referee: (United Arab Emirates) Mohammed Ali Mushiri
Note: FCB without Kreuzer (rested), König (substitute), Cantaluppi, Koumantarakis, Aziawonou, and Savic (injured), as well as Huggel (was ill). In the 72nd minute, Anzhi goalkeeper Shitkov was sent off for a professional foul on Tum. Anzhi subsequently continued with eleven men because the referee misinterpreted the rules and Gross chose not to contest the error—a gesture his Russian counterpart acknowledged with a thumbs-up.

4 February 2001 Training camp	Sparta Prague (Czech Republic)	3–0	(Switzerland) Basel	Maktoum bin Rashid Al Maktoum Stadium, Dubai, United Arab Emirates
	Obajdin 21' (1:0); Obajdin 30' (2:0); Obajdin 68' (3:0)	FCB summary		Attendance: 20,000
Note: Sparta without Svoboda, FCB without Huggel (convalescent), Koumantarakis, Aziawonou (both injured) and Tum (rested).

7 February 2001 Winter break	Basel (Switzerland)	1–1	(Switzerland) Xamax	Stadion Rankhof, Basel
12:15	Cantaluppi 64' (1:1)	FCB summary	55' (0:1) Geijo	Attendance: 300; Referee: (Switzerland) Claudio Circhetta (Muttenz)
Note: Basel without König, Kreuzer, Cravero, Magro, and Ergic (all rested), and Aziawonou and Koumantarakis (both injured). Minute of silence in honor of the late former FCB coach Emil Müller.

10 February 2001 Winter break	Yverdon-Sports (Switzerland)	2–3	(Switzerland) Basel	Stade Municipal, Yverdon
	Gohouri 2' (1:0); Gil 45' (2:1)	FCB summary	25' (1:1) Magro; 52' (2:2) Magro; 72' (2:3) Tchouga	Attendance: 450; Referee: (Switzerland) Guido Wildhaber (Kerzers)
Note: Basel without Yakin, Ergic, Koumantarakis, Aziawonou (all injured); Yverdon without Delay, Renatus, Cavin, Diogo, Peço (all injured). - 32nd Cantaluppi's free kick hits the crossbar. 37th minute Huggel left with a bruised foot, from then tactical change, Varela on the right in midfield, Barberis in the center. 71st minute after Barberis' substitution, Magro in central midfield, Savic on the left. Fair game, no yellow cards given.

13 February 2001 Winter break	Basel (Switzerland)	5–0	(Switzerland) Solothurn	Stadion Rankhof, Basel
12:15	Tum 7' (1:0); Magro 25' (2:0); Magro 39' (3:0); H. Yakin 74' (4:0); Magro 90+1' (5:0)	FCB summary		Attendance: 500; Referee: (Switzerland) Martin Salm
Note: FCB without Aziawonou, Ergic, Koumantarakis, and Huggel. 15th minute: Kreuzer leaves the pitch with a strained ligament. 63rd minute: Yakin moves up to the attack; Savic moves to the left side of midfield. Fair game, no yellow cards given.

23 March 2001 Mid-season	Basel (Switzerland)	1–2	(Switzerland) Aarau	Stadion Rankhof, Basel
18:00	Savić 51' (1:0)	FCB summary	58' (1:1) Didi; 75' (1:2) Didi	Attendance: 200; Referee: (Switzerland) Martin Salm
Note: FCB without Cravero and Cantaluppi (both injured), Muff, Yakin, and König (all on national team duty), as well as Tum and Tchouga (rested). 27th minute a shot from Magro hit the crossbar, 31st minute a shot from Kreuzer hit the crossbar. Corners: 6–4 (4–3). Fair game, no cautions given.

28 March 2001 Mid-season	Basel (Switzerland)	3–3	(Switzerland) Wangen bei Olten	Stadion Rankhof, Basel
12:00	M. Yakin 29' (1:0); Savić 45' (2:0); Muff 75' (3:1)	FCB summary	61' (2:1) Renfer; 82' (pen. 3:2) Renfer; 90+2' (3:3) Souffa	Attendance: 200; Referee: (Switzerland) Claudio Circhetta (Muttenz)
Note: FCB without König, Ceccaroni, Knez, Kreuzer, Cravero, Cantaluppi, Varela, Hakan Yakin, Tum, Tchouga, Huggel, Koumantarakis, and Aziawonou (all away with national teams, injured, or rested). Murat Yakin’s first appearance for FCB since his return. 36th minute: a shot from Savic hit the woodwork. Fair game, no cautions given.

3 April 2001 Mid-season	SC Dornach (Switzerland)	0–8	(Switzerland) Basel	Gigersloch, Dornach
		FCB summary	20' (0:1) H. Yakin; 22' (0:2) H. Yakin; 26' (0:3) Savić; 42' (0:4) Savić; 47' (pen. 0:5) H. Yakin; 52' (0:6) Savić; 72' (0:7) H. Yakin; 78' (0:8) Barberis	Attendance: 300; Referee: (Switzerland) Umherr
Note: Dornach without Busetti and Weidmann (injured). FCB without König, Ceccaroni, Kreuzer, Murat Yakin, Quennoz, Varela, Cantaluppi, Ergic, Magro, Tum, Tchouga (all rested) and Koumantarakis (injured). Fair game, no cautions given.

18 April 2000 Mid-season	Basel (Switzerland)	7–0	(Switzerland) SC Baudepartement Basel	Stadion Rankhof, Basel
	Ebe 5' (1:0); Neri 9' (2:0); Tchouga 14' (3:0); Magro 16' (4:0); Spallino 46' (5:0); Cravero 65' (6:0); Becirevic 89' (7:0)	FCB summary		Attendance: 40; Referee: (Switzerland) Antonio Caselle

1 May 2001 Mid-season	Basel (Switzerland)	5–1	(Switzerland) Solothurn	St. Jakob Stadium, Basel
12:00	Ebe 8' (1:0); Savić 32' (2:0); P. Degen 39' (3:0); Streller 46' (4:0); Streller 71' (5:0)	FCB summary	76' (5:1) Geisbühler	Attendance: 1,000; Referee: (Switzerland) Claudio Circhetta (Muttenz)
Note: FCB without most of the players who had featured in the recent match against Sion. Solothurn was without Hotz, Edson, Küffer, Edward, and Plevka (all injured). Tactical change, following Streller's substitution, Renfer played as right-back and Varela in right midfield.

=== Nationalliga A ===
==== Qualifying Phase ====
The Qualification Round to the League season 2000–01 was contested by twelve teams. The first eight teams of the regular season (or Qualification) were then to compete in the Championship Playoff Round. The teams in the ninth to twelfth positions completed with the top four teams of the Nationalliga B in a promotion/relegation round. The qualifying phase started on 15 July 200 and was to be completed on 10 December.

15 July 2000 Round 1	Basel	4–1	Sion	Stadion Schützenmatte, Basel
18:00	Tchouga 12' (1:0); Cravero (yellow card) 14'; Ceccaroni (yellow card) 45'; Tchouga 61' (2:1); Tchouga 67' (3:1); Tchouga 76' (4:1)	'FCB summary	(yellow card) 35' Deumi; (yellow card) 37' Fayolle; 57' (1:1) Fayolle; (yellow card) 53' Grichting	Attendance: 5,491; Referee: (Switzerland) Urs Meier (Wettingen and Würenlos)
Note: FCB without Cantaluppi (injured), Magro (not in the squad), and Ergic (lacking match fitness). Sion without Delgado and Marazzi (both absent). 54th minute: a shot from Savic hit the post. 56th minute: a shot from Enilton hit the post.

19 July 2000 Round 2	Xamax	2–0	Basel	Stade de la Maladière (1924), Neuchâtel
19:30	Buess (yellow card) 33'; Bühler (yellow card) 37'; Alex 50' (1:0); Diop (yellow card) 80'; Zambaz 90+4' (2:0)	FCB summary	(yellow card) 39' Huggel; (yellow card) 40' Calapes; (yellow card) 90+1' Tchouga	Attendance: 7,100; Referee: (Switzerland) Gilles Golay
Note: Xamax without Sène (injured). FCB without Cantaluppi (injured). Swiss national coach Enzo Trossero in the stands.

22 July 2000 Round 3	Basel	7–4	Luzern	Stadion Schützenmatte, Basel
19:30	Huggel 7' (1:0); Kreuzer 9' (pen.); Tchouga 14' (3:0); Muff (yellow card) 51'; Varela (yellow card) 59'; Tchouga 60' (4:3); Tholot 65' (5:4); Huggel 73' (6:4); Tholot (yellow card) 74'; Tchouga 85' (pen. 7:4)	FCB summary	26' (3:1) A. Frei; 29' (3:2) Wyss; 35' (3:3) Wyss; (yellow card) 36' Blunschi; (yellow card) 43' Feuz; (yellow card) 53' Arnold; (yellow card) 59' Spycher; 66' (4:4)Wyss; (red card) 85' Gordien; (yellow card) 85' Wyss	Attendance: 8,207; Referee: (Switzerland) Dieter Schoch (Attiswil)
Note: FCB without Ergin (not yet qualified); FCL without Selimi, Gian (both injured), and Enrique (suspended). 5th minute: Koumantarakis left the game with cervical spine and rib injuries. Tactical change, FCL played the second half with Ohrel in defense and Sander in midfield. Luzern played with only 10 men from the 75th to the 85th minute (because Amarildo was injured).

29 July 2000 Round 4	Basel	1–0	Grasshopper Club	Stadion Schützenmatte, Basel
18:00	Cantaluppi (yellow card) 16'; Zanni 48' (o.g.); Savić (yellow card) 69'	FCB summary	(yellow card) 41' Smiljanić; (yellow card) 69' Cabanas; (yellow card) 69' (yellow-red card) 82' Schwegler; (red card) 90+4' Huber	Attendance: 7,112; Referee: (Austria) Fritz Stuchlik
Note: This match was played as part of the interaction referee exchange between the Swiss Football Association and the Austrian Football Association. FCB without Koumantarakis. FCB goalkeeper König played his debut for the team. GC without Yakin, Chapuisat, Haas, Joller, Denicola, and Berner (all injured). 96th minute: GC reserve goalkeeper Jehle saves the penalty conceded and shot by Ceccaroni (Ceccaroni scored on the rebound, but the referee had already blown the whistle).

5 August 2000 Round 5	Yverdon-Sports	1–0	Basel	Stade Municipal, Yverdon
19:30	Costantino 67' (1:0)	FCB summary		Attendance: 3,800; Referee: (Switzerland) Markus Nobs (Wohlen bei Bern)
Note: Yverdon without Diogo and Favre (both injured). FCB without Huggel, Koumantarakis, and Tchouga (all injured). Fair game, no cautions.

13 August 2000 Round 6	Basel	2–3	Lugano	Stadion Schützenmatte, Basel
16:15	Kreuzer 5' (1:0); Tchouga 27' (2:1); Tholot (yellow card) 51'; Huggel (yellow card) 67'	FCB summary	16' (1:1) Bullo; (yellow card) 19' Bullo; 29' (2:2) Giménez; 44' (2:3) Giménez; (yellow card) 67' Giménez; (yellow card) 70' Zagorčić	Attendance: 6,236; Referee: (Liechtenstein) Roland Beck (Triesenberg)
Note: FCB without Koumantarakis (injured). Lugano without Rossi, Rothenbühler, Morf, Hoy, and Moresi (all injured). 42nd minute: the corner kick from Magro hit the crossbar and bounced behind.

19 August 2000 Round 7	Servette	1–1	Basel	Charmilles Stadium, Geneva
19:30	Lonfat 84' (1:1)	FCB summary	25' (0:1) Tchouga; (yellow card) 44' Cantaluppi; (yellow card) 66' Huggel; (yellow card) 90+3' König; (yellow card) 90+4' Kreuzer	Attendance: 4,815; Referee: (Switzerland) Urs Meier (Wettingen and Würenlos)
Note: Servette without Jeanneret (suspended), El Brazi (Morocco national team), Vanetta and Thurre (both injured). FCB without Cravero and Koumantarakis (both injured). 35th minute Kreuzer defends a Lonfat shot on the line. 75th minute, Referee Meier leaves injured, assistant Rudolf Käppeli took over and led the game until the end. 97th minute, a shot from Jaquet bounced off the post, then Siljak's offside goal was correctly disallowed.

27 August 2000 Round 8	Basel	2–2	St. Gallen	Stadion Schützenmatte, Basel
16:15	Magro 21' (1:0); Magro 49' (2:0); Tchouga (yellow card) 55'; Kreuzer (penalty missed) 60′	FCB summary	(yellow card) 33' Nixon; 57' (2:1) Jairo; (yellow card) 59' Walker; (yellow card) 73' Zellweger; 74' (2:2) Amoah	Attendance: 6,208; Referee: (Switzerland) Massimo Busacca (Monte Carasso/Bellinzona)
Note: FCB without Cravero (injured) and Savic (was ill). St. Gallen without Guido, Müller, and Thüler (all injured). 48th minute: a shot from Cantaluppi hit the post. 60th minute: FCSG goalkeeper Stiel saved the penalty taken by Kreuzer following a foul. 61st minute: Kreuzer substituted after suffering a head wound in a collision with Amoah. 84th minute: Stiel deflects a shot from Knez onto the post.

5 September 2000 Round 9	Aarau	0–1	Basel	Stadion Brügglifeld, Aarau
19:30	Pavličević (yellow card) 3'	FCB summary FCA summary	(yellow card) 26' Cantaluppi; 36' (0:1) Tchouga	Attendance: 5,800; Referee: (Switzerland) Nicole Petignat (Courgenay)
Note: FCA without Page, Bader, Senn, Baudry, Skrzypczak, and De Napoli (all injured). FCA without Muff (injured).

8 September 2000 Round 10	Basel	1–1	Zürich	Stadion Schützenmatte, Basel
19:30	Cantaluppi (yellow card) 42'; Kreuzer 64' (pen.); Quennoz (yellow card) 72'	FCB summary FCZ summary	(yellow card) 21' Hellinga; (yellow card) 50' Giannini; 76' (1:1) Kavelashvili	Attendance: 7,186; Referee: (Switzerland) Reto Rutz (Amriswil)
Note: FCB without Ceccaroni and Savic (both injured). FCZ without Opango (long-term injured) Bonalair, Djordjevic and Margairaz (all injured). 34th minute: FCZ goalkeeper Pascolo left the pitch with a thigh injury and was replaced by Trombini. 16th minute: a header from Kreuzer hit the underside of the crossbar.

17 September 2000 Round 11	Lausanne-Sport	3–0	Basel	Olympique de la Pontaise, Lausanne
16:15	Thiaw 17' (1:0); Kuźba 64' (2:0); Kuźba 68' (pen.)	FCB summary	(yellow card) 17' Tchouga; (yellow card) 68' Kreuzer	Attendance: 5,200; Referee: (Liechtenstein) Roland Beck (Triesenberg)
Note: Lausanne without Santini (suspended) as well as Gobet, Zetzmann, and Christ (all injured). FCB without Cantaluppi (suspended) as well as Ceccaroni and Cravero (both injured).

23 September 2000 Round 12	Sion	1–1	Basel	Stade Tourbillon, Sion
19:30	Enílton (yellow card) 37'; Duruz (yellow card) 61'; Grichting (yellow card) 71'; Enílton 82' (pen.)	FCB summary	(yellow card) 45' Varela; (yellow card) 53' Barberis; (yellow card) 59' Cravero; 70' (0:1) Savić; (yellow card) (yellow-red card) 84' Cravero; (yellow card) 75' Koumantarakis	Attendance: 6,800; Referee: (Switzerland) René Rogalla (Wallisellen)
Note: Sion without Vernaz (injured). FCB without Ceccaroni, Tholot, Crevoisier, and Aziawonou (all injured). National team coach Enzo Trossero in the stands. 18th minute: a header from Tum hit the outside of the post.

1 October 2000 Round 13	Basel	5–1	Xamax	Stadion Schützenmatte, Basel
16:15	Huggel 4' (1:0); Cantaluppi 19' (2:0); Tchouga 55' (3:0); Cantaluppi (yellow card) 59'; Muff 78' (4:1); Varela 85' (5:1)	FCB summary	(yellow card) 7' Keller; (yellow card) 39' Buess; (yellow card) 59' Camara; 70' (3:1) Camara; (yellow card) 72' Atouba	Attendance: 6,031; Referee: (Switzerland) Fabian Schmid
Note: FCB without Cravero (suspended) and Ceccaroni (injured). Xamax without Sène and Simo (both injured).

14 October 2000 Round 14	Luzern	0–2	Basel	Stadion Allmend, Luzern
19:30	Amarildo (yellow card) 45'; Lipawsky (red card) 52'	FCB summary	15' (0:1) Koumantarakis; (yellow card) 18' Cravero; 35' (0:2) Koumantarakis; (yellow card) 47' Kreuzer; (yellow card) 53' Huggel; (yellow card) 82' Magro; (yellow card) 85' Tchouga	Attendance: 8,169; Referee: (Switzerland) Carlo Bertolini
Note: FCL without Arnold and Silvio (both injured) and new signings Belajic and Lerant (neither yet cleared by the National League). FCB without Ceccaroni, Aziawonou, and backup goalkeeper Crevoisier (all injured). 47th minute: a shot from Cravero hit the post. 78th minute: a shot from Tchouga hit the post.

22 October 2000 Round 15	Grasshopper Club	1–2	Basel	Hardturm, Zürich
16:15	Esposito (yellow card) 13'; H. Yakin 31' (1:2); H. Yakin (yellow card) 84'	FCB summary	(yellow card) 2' Ceccaroni; 15' (0:1) Tholot; 27' (0:2) Varela; (yellow card) 49' Magro; (yellow card) 51' Savić	Attendance: 12,800; Referee: (Switzerland) Philippe Leuba (Chexbres)
Note: GC without Berner (suspended), Cabanas, Hodel, and Joller (all injured). FCB without Kreuzer, Huggel, and Tchouga (all suspended), and Aziawonou and Crevoisier (both injured). 45th minute: a shot from Yakin hit the post.

29 October 2000 Round 16	Basel	2–1	Yverdon-Sports	Stadion Schützenmatte, Basel
16:15	Cantaluppi 64' (1:1); Kreuzer 67' (pen. 2:1); Ergić (yellow card) 74'; Tholot (yellow card) 80'; Tchouga (yellow card) 86'; Cravero (yellow card) 90+3'	FCB summary	32' (0:1) Jenny; (yellow card) 46' Peço; (yellow card) 72' Costantino	Attendance: 6,035; Referee: (Switzerland) Guido Wildhaber (Kerzers)
Note: FCB without Koumantarakis (suspended) as well as Aziawonou and Crevoisier (both injured). Yverdon without Gil (suspended). 45th minute: a direct free kick by Cantaluppi hit the underside of the crossbar.

4 November 2000 Round 18	Basel	4–2	Servette	Stadion Schützenmatte, Basel
19:30	Cantaluppi 16' (1:1); Muff 46' (2:2); Muff 47' (3:2); Tholot 76' (4:2); Barberis (yellow card) 89'	FCB summary	12' (0:1) Ippoliti 35' (1:2) Petrov; (yellow card) 56' Petrov; (yellow card) (yellow-red card) 57' Ippoliti; (yellow card) 81' Lachor; (yellow card) 87' Pizzinat	Attendance: 5,113; Referee: (Switzerland) Nicole Petignat (Courgenay)
Note: FCB without Koumantarakis (suspended), Tchouga, Aziawonou, and Crevoisier (injured). Servette without Jeanneret, Thurre, Vanetta, Oruma, and Diogo. Servette coach Favre sent to the stands following vehement protests.

12 November 2000 Round 17	Lugano	1–0	Basel	Cornaredo, Lugano
14:30	Lubamba (yellow card) 40'; Giménez 60'; Biaggi (yellow card) 77'	FCB summary	(yellow card) 49' Magro; (yellow card) 75' Cantaluppi; (yellow card) 90' Kreuzer	Attendance: 5,250; Referee: (Austria) Günter Benkö
Note: This match was played as part of the interaction referee exchange between the Swiss Football Association and the Austrian Football Association. Lugano without Bullo and Ludovic Magnin (both injured), Rota and Rossi (both suspended). FCB without Koumantarakis (suspended) as well as Aziawonou, Cravero, and Varela (all injured). 45th minute: a shot from Gaspoz hit the angle of the crossbar and post.

19 November 2000 Round 19	St. Gallen	4–0	Basel	Espenmoos, St. Gallen
16:15	Nixon 24' (1:0); Müller 45'; Amoah 68'; Nixon 75' (4:0)	FCB summary	(yellow card) 9' Tchouga; (yellow card) 45' Cantaluppi; (yellow card) 81' Magro; (yellow card) 90+1' Kreuzer	Attendance: 11,300; Referee: (Austria) Gerald Lehner
Note: This match was played as part of the interaction referee exchange between the Swiss Football Association and the Austrian Football Association. St. Gallen without Jairo, Walker, Thüler, and backup goalkeeper Alder (all injured). FCB without Koumantarakis (suspended), Muff, and Aziawonou (both injured). Müller hit the crossbar with a shot. The bottom rows of lights on four floodlight towers failed midway through the first half (this was repaired during the half-time break).

26 November 2000 Round 20	Basel	5–2	Aarau	Stadion Schützenmatte, Basel
16:15	Koumantarakis 24' (1:1); Huggel 30' (2:1); Huggel (yellow card) 37'; Varela (yellow card) 39'; Huggel 47' (3:1); Tchouga 65' (4:2); Tholot 85' (5:2)	FCB summary FCA summary	7' (0:1) Wiederkehr; (yellow card) 34' Hamdzic; (yellow card) 50' Didi; 54' (3:2) Wiederkehr; (red card) 68' Senn	Attendance: 6,251; Referee: (Switzerland) Massimo Busacca (Monte Carasso/Bellinzona)
Note: FCB without Magro (suspended) as well as König, Savic, Muff, and Aziawonou (all injured). FCA without Previtali (suspended), De Napoli, Page, and Baudry (all injured), as well as Ivanov (relegated to the youth squad).

3 December 2000 Round 21	Zürich	2–0	Basel	Letzigrund, Zürich
16:15	Kavelashvili 33' (pen.); Quentin (yellow card) 35'; Jamarauli 68' (2:0); Fischer (yellow card) 85'	FCB summary FCZ summary	(yellow card) 14' Varela; (yellow card) 21' Barberis; (yellow card) 32' Cantaluppi	Attendance: 8,900; Referee: (Switzerland) Urs Meier
Note: FCZ without Del Signore (suspended), as well as Castillo and Opango (both injured) and Ndlovu (was ill). FCB without Ceccaroni, Quennoz, Muff, and Aziawonou (all injured).

10 December 2000 Round 22	Basel	2–3	Lausanne-Sport	Stadion Schützenmatte, Basel
16:15	Ergić 9' (1:0); Kreuzer 11' (2:0); Quennoz (yellow card) 19'; Savić (yellow card) 44'; Barberis (yellow card) 59'	FCB summary	(yellow card) 22' Santini; 27' (2:1) Lombardo; 43' (2:2) Kuźba; (yellow card) 60' Baudry; 63' (2:3) Kuźba; (yellow card) 87' Thiaw; (yellow card) 87' Lombardo	Attendance: 7,153; Referee: (Switzerland) Reto Rutz (Amriswil)
Note: FCB without Cantaluppi, Cravero and Varela (all suspended), and Koumantarakis, Ceccaroni, Crevoisier and Aziawonou (all injured). Lausanne without Christ, Gobet and Zetzmann (all injured), as well as Mazzoni (undergoing medical tests in Santander). Last match for FCB at the Schützenmatte.

==== League table ====
Pos	Team	Pld	W	D	L	GF	GA	GD	Pts	Qualification
1	Lugano	22	12	6	4	33	16	+17	42	Advance to championship round halved points (rounded up) as bonus
2	St. Gallen	22	11	7	4	43	18	+25	40	Advance to championship round halved points (rounded up) as bonus
3	Grasshopper Club	22	11	3	8	46	25	+21	36	Advance to championship round halved points (rounded up) as bonus
4	Lausanne-Sport	22	11	2	9	37	34	+3	35	Advance to championship round halved points (rounded up) as bonus
5	Basel	22	10	4	8	42	36	+6	34	Advance to championship round halved points (rounded up) as bonus
6	Servette	22	9	6	7	34	26	+8	33	Advance to championship round halved points (rounded up) as bonus
7	Sion	22	9	5	8	27	31	−4	32	Advance to championship round halved points (rounded up) as bonus
8	Zürich	22	8	7	7	36	29	+7	31	Advance to championship round halved points (rounded up) as bonus
9	Aarau	22	6	6	10	31	43	−12	24	Continue to promotion/relegation round
10	Yverdon-Sport	22	5	6	11	27	43	−16	21	Continue to promotion/relegation round
11	Xamax	22	6	2	14	21	53	−32	20	Continue to promotion/relegation round
12	Luzern	22	5	4	13	27	50	−23	19	Continue to promotion/relegation round

Source: RSSSF
Rules for classification: 1) points; 2) goal difference; 3) number of goals scored.

==== Champions Group ====
The first eight teams of the qualification round competed in the championship group. They took half of the points (rounded up to complete units) gained in the qualification as bonus with them. The championship round began on 25 February 2001 and was completed on 26 May.

25 February 2001 Round 1	Servette	3–0	Basel	Charmilles Stadium, Geneva
16:15	Wolf (yellow card) 11'; Petrov 15' (1:0); A. Frei 33' (2:0); Oruma 74' (3:0)	FCB summary	(yellow card) 19' Varela	Attendance: 4,439; Referee: (Switzerland) Dieter Schoch (Attiswil)
Note: Servette without Lachor (suspended). FCB without Aziawonou, Kreuzer, Koumantarakis, and Quennoz (all injured), and Barberis and Cantaluppi (both suspended). 15th minute: FCB goalkeeper König deflects a shot by Bratic against the post.

11 March 2001 Round 2	Grasshopper Club	0–0	Basel	Hardturm, Zürich
16:15		FCB summary	(yellow card) 33' Ceccaroni	Attendance: 11,000; Referee: (Switzerland) Markus Nobs (Wohlen bei Bern)
Note: GC without Cabanas (suspended) and Camara (Senegal national team). FCB without Cravero, Huggel, Koumantarakis, and Aziawonou (all injured).

15 March 2001 Round 3	Basel	0–0	Lausanne-Sport	St. Jakob-Park, Basel
20:15	Cantaluppi (yellow card) 78'; H. Yakin (yellow card) 89'	FCB summary	(yellow card) 29' Puce; (yellow card) 40' Horjak; (yellow card) 51' Hellebuyck; (yellow card) 90' Meyer	Attendance: 33,433 (sold out); Referee: (Switzerland) Massimo Busacca (Monte Carasso/Bellinzona)
Note: This was the first match at the new St. Jakob-Park. FCB without Cravero, Huggel, Koumantarakis, and Aziawonou (all injured). Lausanne without Gobet (injured) and Zambaz (was ill). National team coach Enzo Trossero and many guests in the stands. 20th minute: a header from Yakin hit the outside of the left post. 37th minute: a shot from Yakin hit the outside of the right goal post.

18 March 2001 Round 4	Basel	4–1	Lugano	St. Jakob-Park, Basel
16:15	Magro (yellow card) 9'; Tum 51' (1:1); Magro 56' (2:1); Varela 58' (3:1); Tum 62' (4:1)	FCB summary	(yellow card) 5' Bastida; 22' (0:1) Giménez; (yellow card) 45' Gaspoz; (yellow card) 51' Brunner	Attendance: 24,300; Referee: (Switzerland) Philippe Leuba (Chexbres)
Note: FCB without Hakan Yakin (suspended), Muff (was ill), Cravero, Huggel, Koumantarakis, and Aziamonou (all injured). Lugano without Biaggi, Rota, Lubamba (all suspended), Moresi, Bullo, Zagorcic, and backup goalkeeper Walker (all injured). 75th minute: a shot from Ergic hit the post.

1 April 2001 Round 5	Zürich	0–0	Basel	Letzigrund, Zürich
16:15	Quentin (yellow card) 10'	FCB summary FCZ summary	(yellow card) 15' Kreuzer; (yellow card) 27' Ceccaroni; (yellow card) 26' Varela; (yellow card) 78' Muff	Attendance: 12,200; Referee: (Liechtenstein) Roland Beck (Triesenberg)
Note: FCZ without Jeanneret (suspended) and Heldmann (injured). FCB without Hakan Yakin (suspended), Koumantarakis, Cravero, Huggel, and Aziawonou (all injured).

7 April 2001 Round 6	Basel	2–1	Sion	St. Jakob-Park, Basel
19:30	Tchouga 8' (1:0); Varela (yellow card) 51'; M. Yakin 76' (2:0)	FCB summary	(yellow card) 11' Furo; (yellow card) 41' Piffaretti; 90+2' (2:1) Sirufo	Attendance: 24,200; Referee: (Switzerland) Nicole Petignat (Courgenay)
Note: FCB ohne Koumantarakis (verletzt). Sion ohne Ojong und Kenedy (beide verletzt).

14 April 2001 Round 7	Basel	1–1	St. Gallen	St. Jakob-Park, Basel
20:15	Kreuzer (yellow card) 30'; Ceccaroni (yellow card) 47'; Tum 52' (1:0); Cantaluppi (yellow card) 67'; Huggel (yellow card) 86'	FCB sumarry	(yellow card) 13' Winkler; 56' (1:1) Gane; (yellow card) 87' Gane	Attendance: 33,433 (sold out); Referee: (Switzerland) Carlo Bertolini (Vira-Gambarogno)
Note: FCB without Koumantarakis and Quennoz (both injured). St. Gallen without Müller, Alder, Walker, and Pinelli (all injured). 48th minute: a cross from Cantaluppi bounced off the crossbar.

22 April 2001 Round 8	St. Gallen	3–2	Basel	Espenmoos, St. Gallen
16:15	Winkler (yellow card) 25'; Zwyssig 30' (1:0); Jefferson (yellow card) 36'; Nixon 46' (2:0); Nixon (yellow card) 50'; Zellweger 90+5' (3:2)	FCB summary	(yellow card) 1' Barberis; (yellow card) 12' (yellow-red card) 25' Savić; (yellow card) 45' Cravero; (yellow card) 51' M. Yakin; 58' (2:1) Huggel; (yellow card) 60' Varela; (yellow card) 70' H. Yakin; (yellow card) (yellow-red card) 73' Cravero; 83' (2:2) H. Yakin	Attendance: 11,300; Referee: (Switzerland) Dieter Schoch (Attiswil)
Note: Very snowy weather. St. Gallen without Pinelli, Walker, and Alder (all injured). FCB without Ceccaroni and Kreuzer (both suspended), and Koumantarakis, Quennoz and Muff (all injured). 46th minute: Basel lodged a formal protest following the Nixon goal that made it 2–0. 150 volunteers had been shoveling snow off the pitch since 6:30 in the morning.

28 April 2001 Round 9	Sion	0–1	Basel	Stade Tourbillon, Sion
19:30	Grichting (yellow card) 44'; Perdichizzi (yellow card) 52'; Furo (yellow card) 53'; Đurišić (yellow card) 90+2'	FCB summary	(yellow card) 12' Tum; 40' (0:1) H. Yakin	Attendance: 8,400; Referee: (Switzerland) Urs Meier (Wettingen and Würenlos)
Note: Sion without Hottiger (suspended), Ojong (injured). FCB without Cravero, Kreuzer, Savic, Varela (all four suspended), Cantaluppi, Koumantarakis, Muff (all three injured).

6 May 2001 Round 10	Basel	2–1	Zürich	St. Jakob-Park, Basel
16:15	Huggel 6' (1:0); H. Yakin 65' (2:0); Savić (yellow card) 67'	FCB summary FCZ summary	(yellow card) 11' (yellow-red card) 54' Renato; 71' (2:1) Chihab>	Attendance: 31,041; Referee: (Switzerland) Markus Nobs (Wohlen bei Bern)
Note: FCB without Varela (suspended), Barberis, Cantaluppi, Koumantarakis and Muff (injured). FCZ without Heldmann (injured).

13 May 2001 Round 11	Lugano	1–1	Basel	Cornaredo, Lugano
16:15	Giménez 9' (1:0); Rota (yellow card) 17'; Zagorčić (yellow card) 44'	FCB summary	(yellow card) 28' Huggel; 36' (1:1) H. Yakin; (yellow card) 66' Barberis; (yellow card) 86' Kreuzer	Attendance: 7,250; Referee: (Austria) Bernhard Brugger
Note: This match was played within the interaction referee exchange between the Swiss Football Association and the Austrian Football Association. Lugano without Bastida and Joël Magnin (both suspended) and Rothenbühler (injured). FCB without Savic (suspended), Koumantarakis, Muff and Ebe (all injured). 48th minute: a shot frum Barberis hit the post. 73rd minute: FCB goalkeeper König deflected a shot from Türkyilmaz onto the crossbar.

15 May 2001 Round 12	Basel	3–3	Grasshopper Club	St. Jakob-Park, Basel
19:30	Tum 21' (1:1); Magro (yellow card) 55'; Magro 62' (2:1); Magro 75' (3:1)	FCB summary	10' (1:0) Cabanas; (yellow card) 19' Diop; (yellow card) 45' Haas; (yellow card) 51' Camara; (yellow card) 53' Tararache; (yellow card) 60' Smiljanić; 90+1' (3:2) Núñez; 90+2' (3:3) Camara	Attendance: 33,433 (sold out); Referee: (Liechtenstein) Roland Beck (Triesenberg)
Note: FCB without Quennoz, Koumantarakis, Cantaluppi, and Muff (all injured). GC without Chapuisat, Denicolà, Huber, and Joller (all injured). 2nd minute, a shot from Tchouga hit the post.

19 May 2001 Round 13	Lausanne-Sport	1–1	Basel	Olympique de la Pontaise, Lausanne
20:15	Meyer (yellow card) 12'; Karlen (yellow card) 32'; Lutsenko (yellow card) 66'; Kuźba 83' (pen.)	FCB summary	43' (0:1) Huggel; (yellow card) 75' Ergić	Attendance: 1,750; Referee: (Switzerland) Urs Meier (Wettingen and Würenlos)
Note: Lausanne without Gomes (injured), Rappo, and Santini (not in the squad). FCB without Cantaluppi, Cravero, Koumantarakis, Muff and Varela (injured). National team coach Enzo Trossero in the stands. 34th minute: a shot from Knez grazed the crossbar.

26 May 2001 Round 14	Basel	1–1	Servette	St. Jakob-Park, Basel
20:15	Varela (yellow card) 59'; M. Yakin (yellow card) 74'; Barberis 79' (1:1)	FCB summary	51' (0:1) A. Frei	Attendance: 21,852; Referee: (Switzerland) Philippe Leuba (Chexbres)
Note: FCB without Cantaluppi, Koumantarakis, Kreuzer, Muff and Hakan Yakin (all injured). Servette without Abriel and Jaquet (both injured). 31st minute: Servette player Thurre left the pitch with a knee injury. 65th minute: a shot from Petrov landed against the inside of the goal post and bounced back into play.

==== League table ====
Pos	Team	Pld	W	D	L	GF	GA	GD	BP	Pts	Qualification
1	Grasshopper Club (C)	14	8	4	2	29	14	+15	18	46	Swiss champions. qualification to Champions League third qualifying round
2	Lugano	14	5	5	4	24	19	+5	21	41	Qualification to Champions League second qualifying round
3	St. Gallen	14	6	2	6	23	28	−5	20	40	qualification to UEFA Cup qualifying round
4	Basel	14	4	8	2	18	16	+2	17	37	entered Intertoto Cup second round
5	Servette	14	5	5	4	26	19	+7	17	37	Swiss Cup winners, qualification to UEFA Cup first round (Note: As 2000–01 Swiss Cup winner.)
6	Lausanne-Sport	14	4	3	7	15	27	−12	18	33	entered Intertoto Cup first round
7	Sion	14	4	4	6	16	22	−6	16	32	
8	Zürich	14	3	3	8	12	18	−6	16	28	

Source: RSSSF
Rules for classification: 1) points; 2) goal difference; 3) number of goals scored.
(C) Champions
Notes:

Grasshopper Club won the championship and this was GC's 26th championship title to this date.

=== Swiss Cup ===
18 February 2001 Round 5	Etoile Carouge	1–1 (a.e.t.) (8–9 p)	Basel	Stade de la Fontenette, Carouge
15:00	Ebe (yellow card) 33'; Villiot 66' (1:0); Besseyre (yellow card) 84'; Iglesias (yellow card) 111'	FCB summary	(yellow card) 37' Cantaluppi; 83' (1:1) H. Yakin; (penalty missed) 91′ Cantaluppi	Attendance: 1,185; Referee: (Switzerland) Guido Wildhaber (Kerzers)
	Penalties
	Derivaz (penalty scored); Villiot (penalty scored); Ballon (penalty scored); Bell (penalty missed); Boughanem (penalty scored); Braizat (penalty scored); Stilz (penalty scored); Daquin (penalty scored); Morisod (penalty scored); Iglesias (penalty missed)		(penalty scored) H. Yakin; (penalty missed) Knez; (penalty scored) Tchouga; (penalty scored) Cantaluppi; (penalty scored) Magro; (penalty scored) Muff; (penalty scored) Savić; (penalty scored) Cravero; (penalty scored) Tum; (penalty scored) Ceccaroni
Note: Carouge without Fernandez (suspended), Peneveyre, Parra, Mazolo (all injured), and Roncen (ineligible). FCB without Varela (bereavement), Kreuzer, Huggel, Koumantarakis, Ergic, and Aziawonou (all injured). A minute of silence in respect for Carlos Varela’s late mother. 8th minute: a cross from Tums hit the outside of the post. 56th minute: a header from Knez hit the crossbar. 91st minute: Carouge goalkeeper Dominik save the penalty taken by Cantaluppi following a foul.

4 March 2001 Round 6	Bellinzona	2–3	Basel	Stadio Comunale Bellinzona
14:30	Tarone 18'; Manfreda 52'; Edusei (yellow card) 56'; Tsawa (yellow card) 76'; Bugnard (yellow card) 89' (yellow-red card) 90+4'	FCB summary	31', 76' Tchouga; (yellow card) 50' H. Yakin; 70' Magro	Attendance: 3,000; Referee: (Switzerland) Urs Meier (Würenlos)

11 April 2001 Quarterfinal	Lausanne-Sport	0–0 (a.e.t.) (7–6 p)	Basel	Olympique de la Pontaise, Lausanne
19:30	Christ (yellow card) 47'; Meyer (yellow card) 71' (yellow-red card) 83'; Simon (yellow card) 76'	FCB summary		Attendance: 3,500; Referee: (Switzerland) Reto Rutz (Amriswil)
	Penalties
	Lombardo (penalty scored); Christ (penalty scored); Simon (penalty scored); Puce (penalty scored); Santini (penalty scored); Hellebuyck (penalty scored); Panow (penalty scored)		(penalty scored) M. Yakin; (penalty scored) Cantaluppi; (penalty scored) Ergić; (penalty scored) Kreuzer; (penalty scored) Huggel; (penalty scored) Savić; (penalty missed) Ceccaroni
Note: Lausanne without Gobet, Gomes and Karlen (all injured), Horjak (youth team) and Masudi (surplus foreign player); FCB without Koumantarakis (injured).

At the end of the season, Servette won the cup and this was their seventh cup title to this date.

=== UEFA Cup ===
==== Qualifying round ====
10 August 2000 1st leg	Folgore (San Marino)	1–5	(Switzerland) Basel	Stadio Olimpico, Serravalle
20:00	Rossi (yellow card) 55'; S. Bianchi (yellow card) 73'; Zanotti 79' (1:5)	Uefa summary FCB summary	13' (0:1) Tchouga; 22' (0:2) Tchouga; 40' (0:3) Muff; 48' (0:4) Magro; 77' (0:5) Magro	Attendance: 1,584; Referee: José Luis Mengual Prades (Andorra)
Note: FCB without Koumantarakis and Huggel (both injured). Around 500 Basel fans in the stadium. 29th minute: Ceccaroni left the pitch with a facial injury. 54th minute: a shot from Cantaluppi hit the crossbar.

24 August 2000 Return leg	Basel (Switzerland)	7–0 (12–1 agg.)	(San Marino) Folgore	Hardturm, Zürich
20:00	Muff 7' (1:0); Magro 19' (2:0); Magro 21' (3:0); Tchouga (penalty missed) 31′ Cantaluppi 31' (4:0); Tholot 39' (5:0); Koumantarakis 81' (6:0); Tholot 85' (7:0)	UEFA summary FCB summary	(yellow card) 40' Zanotti; (yellow card) 81' Della Torre	Attendance: 2,113; Referee: David Malcolm (Northern Ireland)
Note: The match was played in Zurich; the Schützenmatte stadium was occupied. FCB without Cravero, Kreuzer, and Huggel (all injured). 31st minute: Folgore goalkeeper Ciacci saved the penalty taken by Tchouga following a foul; Cantaluppi scored on the rebound to make it 4–0. 35th minute: Tchouga, slightly injured, is replaced by Tholot. 42nd minute: a shot from Tholot hit the underside of the crossbar. 88th minute:a direct free kick from Savic hit the post.

Basel won 12–1 on aggregate

==== First round ====
12 September 2000 1st leg	Basel (Switzerland)	3–2	(Norway) Brann	Hardturm, Zürich
18:00	Magro 7' (1:0); Magro (yellow card) 26'; Tchouga 53' (2:1); Kreuzer 86' (pen. 3:2)	UEFA summary FCB summary	(yellow card) 37' Ylönen; 47' (1:1) Ludvigsen; (yellow card) 71' Karadas; 72' (2:2) Helstad	Attendance: 3,250; Referee: Igor Ishchenko (Ukraine)
Note: The match was played in Zurich; the Schützenmatte stadium was occupied. FCB without Ceccaroni (injured); Brann Bergen without Knudsen (was ill) and Hanstveit (injured). 24th minute: Cravero left the pitch with a nose injury; Quennoz subsequently moved to right-back and Barberis to left-back. 19th minute: Tchouga hit the crossbar with a header. 60th minute: a headed goal from Tchouga was disallowed for offside. 64th minute: a shot from Magro hit the post. 82nd minute: a shot from Magro hit the post.

28 September 2000 Return leg	Brann (Norway)	4–4 (6–7 agg.)	(Switzerland) Basel	Brann Stadion, Bergen
19:30	Karadas 4' (1:0); Brendesæter 9' (2:0); Terehhov 31' (3:1); Karadas 40' (4:1); Brendesæter (yellow card) 61'	UEFA summary FCB summary	20' (2:1) Tchouga; (yellow card) 40' Cantaluppi; 59' (o.g. 4:2) Wassberg; 61' (pen. 4:3) Kreuzer; (yellow card) 75' Varela; 90' (4:4) Muff	Attendance: 4,176; Referee: Dani Koren (Israel)
Note: Bran Bergen without Knudsen (was ill) and Samuelsson (injured); FCB without Crevoisier, Ceccaroni, and Tholot (all injured). Tactical changes, FCB played a 3-5-2 system after the break, switching back to a 4-4-2 from the 67th minute.

Basel won 7–6 on aggregate.

==== Second round ====
26 October 2000 1st leg	Basel (Switzerland)	1–2	(Netherlands) Feyenoord	Hardturm, Zürich
21:00	Tchouga (yellow card) 13'; Varela (yellow card) 22'; Tchouga 62' (1:1)	UEFA summary FCB summary	60' (0:1) Kalou; (yellow card) 70' Paauwe; 84' (1:2) Bosvelt	Attendance: 9,700; Referee: John Rowbotham (Scotland)
Note: The match was played in Zurich, because the Schützenmatte stadium was occupied. FCB complete. Feyenoord without van Wonderen and van Gastel (both injured).

9 November 2000 Return leg	Feyenoord (Netherlands)	1–0 (3–1 agg.)	(Switzerland) Basel	De Kuip, Rotterdam
20:00	Kalou 3' (1:0)	UEFA summary FCB summary	(yellow card) 79' Muff	Attendance: 33,000; Referee: Yuri Baskakov (Russia)
Note: Feyenoord without Korneev and Van Wonderen (both injured) and Paauwe (suspended). FCB without Cravero (injured). Conditions were substandard due to heavy rain before and during the match.

Feyenoord won 3–1 on aggregate. At the end of the season, Liverpool won the final with a golden goal in extra-time against Alavés for their third title in this competition.

== See also ==
- History of FC Basel
- List of FC Basel players
- List of FC Basel seasons

== Sources ==
- Rotblau: Jahrbuch Saison 2015/2016. Publisher: FC Basel Marketing AG. ISBN 978-3-7245-2050-4
- Die ersten 125 Jahre / 2018. Publisher: Josef Zindel im Friedrich Reinhardt Verlag, Basel. ISBN 978-3-7245-2305-5
- 2000–01 at "Basler Fussballarchiv” homepage
- 2000–01 at Joggeli.ch
- 2000–01 at RSSSF
