= André Muff =

Swiss footballer (born 1981)

Personal information
- Full name: André Muff
- Date of birth: 28 January 1981 (age 45)
- Height: 1.87 m (6 ft 1 1/2 in)
- Position: Striker

Youth career
- –1997: SC Emmen
- 1997–1999: Grasshopper Club

Senior career*
Years	Team	Apps	(Gls)
1999–2000	Grasshopper Club	7	(4)
2000–2004	FC Basel	16	(3)
2001	→ FC Lugano (loan)	13	(0)
2002–2003	→ FC Luzern (loan)	37	(19)
2003–2004	→ FC Zürich (loan)	17	(8)
2004–2006	Grasshopper Club	27	(7)
2006–2009	Concordia	45	(18)
2009–2011	SC Emmen		

International career
2000–2004	Switzerland U-21	27	(9)
2000–2004	Switzerland	2	(0)

Managerial career
- 2011–2017: SC Emmen
- * Club domestic league appearances and goals

André Muff (born 28 January 1981) is a Swiss former footballer who played as midfielder and then as forward He has also appeared in the squad four times for the Switzerland national football team but played only twice. On 18 June 2009 he retired from professional football due to his reoccurring injuries. He then returned home and joined his former youth club SC Emmen as coach.

== Career ==
=== Early years ===
Muff played his youth football with local amateur club SC Emmen. Aged just 15 years old he played as midfielder in their first team in the 2. Liga, then the fourth tier of Swiss football league system. The midfielder was scouted by Grasshopper Club and joined their youth program in 1997, playing for their U-21 team. During this time, he was trained to play centre forward. For the 1999–2000 season he advanced to their first team under head coach Roy Hodgson. Muff played his team debut on 26 August 1999 in the UEFA Cup match away against Irish team Bray Wanderers. He was substituted in the 63rd minute and two minutes later he scored the team's fourth goal as they won 4–0. In the domestic league GC ended the season in fourth position, Muff had 7 league appearances scoring four goals.

=== Basel ===
On 21 March 2000 it was announced that Muff was moving to FC Basel on a four-year contract. He joined Basel's first team for their 2000–01 season under head coach Christian Gross. Because Gross had other good strikers such as Jean-Michel Tchouga, Edmond N'Tiamoah, Hervé Tum and George Koumantarakis, he used Muff as a winger. After playing in five test games Muff played his domestic league debut for the club in the away game on 19 July 2000 as Basel were defeated 2–0 by Xamax. He scored his first goal for his new club on 10 August during the away game in the qualifying round of the 2000–01 UEFA Cup as Basel won 5–1 against Folgore from San Marino Basel started somewhat irregularly into the season, a number of high scoring games, three victories, three defeats. They then gathered themselves and climbed to the top of the table. However, four defeats in the last five games, through them back to fifth position, at the end of the qualifying stage. Basel were able to play their home games of the championship group in their new stadium, the St. Jakob-Park which opened on 15 March 2001, and it was sold out with 33,433 spectators on three occasions. Muff had 13 appearances in the team's 22 league matches of the qualification round, scoring three goals. He played in four of the six UEFA Cup games, scoring three times. However, in the second half of the season he played only two league games and once in the Swiss Cup. In the second half of the season, the team played eight draws in their 14 matches and so ended the season in fourth position.

Muff started the 2001–02 season with FCB. He played one league match and the two UIC matches against Grindavík, scoring both goals in the second leg as Basel won 2–0. Muff was then aggressively loaned out to Lugano for the first half of the season and to Luzern for the second half. He was again loaned to Luzern for the entire 2002–03 season and under head coach Bidu Zaugg he was a regular starter. Muff had 30 league appearances, scoring 16 goals, but despite these good performance figures he could not save the team from relegation at the end of the campaign.

For the 2003–04 league season Basel loaned Muff to Zürich. Under head coach Lucien Favre he played his debut with the team on 16 July 2003 as FCZ lost 2–1 against FCB. Soon after this Muff suffered an injury had had to undergo groin surgery. The recovery was quick, but in a warmup match with the reserves Muff for a second bookable offence was dismissed and suspended for one match. Therefore, he had to wait another week until his return to playing. By the end of the season, Muff had played a total of 27 games for FCZ scoring a total of eight goals. 17 of these games were in the Swiss Super League, two in the Swiss Cup and eight were friendly games. He scored all eight goals in the domestic league.

Muff did not return to Basel, because his contract was not renewed. During his time with the club, he played a total of 41 games for Basel scoring a total of 10 goals. 16 of these games were in the Swiss Super League, one in the Swiss Cup, six in the UEFA competitions (UEFA Cup and UIC) and 18 were friendly games. He scored three goals in the domestic league, five in the European games and the other two were scored during the test games.

=== Grasshoppers ===
As the contract expired over summer of 2004, Grasshopper Club signed Muff for €1 million, bringing him back to the club where his career had begun. Muff joined the Grasshoppers first team under head coach Alain Geiger and in his first game, in the 2004–05 league season on 17 July 2004, he scored his first goal as GC played a 1–1 draw in the derby against his former club FCZ. Muff immediately became regular starter and scored six goals in 21 league appearances. The team ended the season in third position and thus qualified for the next seasons UEFA Cup

However, during the 2005–06 season, Muff suffered re-occurring injuries and only had six appearances. Due to his slow recovery, in the following season he didn't play any games for GC and during the winter break he moved on.

=== Concordia ===
Muff signed for Concordia Basel, who at that time played in the second level, in the 2006–07 Challenge League and he played as winger alongside Raúl Bobadilla and Alessandro Iandoli. Muff played for Concordia for two and a half seasons, becoming regular starter and goal scorer when he was fit. However, again he was repeatedly thrown back by injuries. On 18 June 2009 he announced that he was retiring from his professional playing career.

He then returned home and joined his former youth club SC Emmen, who at that time played in the fifth tier of Swiss football, first two years as player-coach and from 2011 to 2017 as their head coach.

=== National team ===
Muff joined the Swiss U-21 team in summer 2000 playing his first game for them on 15 August. While on loan to FC Lucerne, Muff played on the host Switzerland national under-21 football team in the 2002 UEFA European Under-21 Championship wearing the number 21 shirt. In total, including friendly matches, he played 27 games scoring nine times.

Muff made 2 appearances on the national team from 2000 to 2005: a friendly match against Tunisia in 2000, as an unused sub in a 2002 FIFA World Cup qualification match against Luxembourg, a friendly match against Northern Ireland in 2004 and as an unused sub in a 2006 FIFA World Cup qualification match against France.

== Sources ==
- Die ersten 125 Jahre. Publisher: Josef Zindel im Friedrich Reinhardt Verlag, Basel. ISBN 978-3-7245-2305-5
- Verein "Basler Fussballarchiv" Homepage
