= Miroslav König =

Slovak footballer

Personal information
- Date of birth: 1 June 1972 (age 54)
- Place of birth: Nitra, Czechoslovakia
- Height: 1.82 m (6 ft 0 in)
- Position: Goalkeeper

Youth career
- 1988–1991: FC Nitra

Senior career*
Years	Team	Apps	(Gls)
1991–1995	FC Nitra	0	(0)
1993–1994	→ Spartak Trnava (loan)	22	(0)
1995–2000	Slovan Bratislava	105	(0)
2000	Grasshopper Club	8	(0)
2000–2002	FC Basel	32	(0)
2001	→ Concordia (loan)	6	(0)
2002–2003	FC Zürich	28	(0)
2003–2004	Elazığspor	26	(0)
2004–2005	Baník Ostrava	6	(0)
2005–2006	MŠK Žilina	27	(0)
2006–2008	Panionios	31	(0)
Total		291	(0)

International career^{‡}
1997–2004	Slovakia	43	(0)
- * Club domestic league appearances and goals as of 13 September 2008 ‡ National team caps and goals as of 10 August 2008

Miroslav König (born 1 June 1972) is a retired Slovak football goalkeeper of German descent, who played during the 1990s and 2000s. He played for a number of clubs in Slovakia, Switzerland, Turkey, the Czech Republic and Greece.

== Career ==
König began his career with FC Nitra in 1991 but never played any games at the club and moved to FC Spartak Trnava in 1993. He impressed during his two seasons with Spartak and was noticed by ŠK Slovan Bratislava for whom he signed in 1995. He went on to play over 100 matches for Slovan over five seasons and earned his place in the Slovak national team. In January 2000, he was signed by Swiss giants Grasshopper Club Zürich under head coach Roy Hodgson as back-up goalie for Stefan Huber. König signed a two-and-a-half-year contract. However, just six months later GC's new coach Hans-Peter Zaugg then opted for Huber and König had to look for a new club.

In July 2000 FC Basel had to find a new goalkeeper in a hurry, as their first-choice keeper Pascal Zuberbühler transferred on a one-year loan to Bayer Leverkusen, and so they signed König. He joined Basel's first team during their 2000–01 season under head coach Christian Gross becoming new first choice keeper. After playing in one test game König played his domestic league debut for his new club in the home game on 29 July 2000 as Basel won 1–0 against his former club Grasshoppers. Basel joined the 2000–01 UEFA Cup in the qualifying round, advancing with a 12–1 aggregate win over Folgore from San Marino and then a 7–6 aggregate victory over Norwegian Brann to the second round. However, here they lost their goal scoring qualities and were knocked out 3–1 on aggregate by Feyenoord. König played in all six matches.

The away game in the Espenmoos against the reigning Swiss champions St. Gallen on 22 April 2001 became notable during König’s period with the club. St. Gallen led 1–0 at half time and as the second half began, Jerren Nixon miss-hit a cross in front of the Basel goal, FCB goalie König plucked the ball down, but the linesman indicated goal. The home team gladly accepted the gift and celebrated the second goal. Meanwhile, the Basel players stormed both referee and linesman and captain Mario Cantaluppi immediately lodged a protest. The goal counted. But despite this, Basel drew level and this although that they had lost two players due to red cards. Referee Schoch indicated four minutes of overtime, but it became six and in this sixth Marc Zellweger scored the winning goal for the home team. The league Disciplinary Committee rejected the protest. St. Gallen ended the season in third position to qualify for the 2001–02 UEFA Cup, Basel fourth and did not qualify.

As Pascal Zuberbühler returned to FCB after his loan in Germany, König was demoted to the reserves and on 5 September 2001 he was loaned out to local lower tier club FC Concordia Basel to gain playing experience. He immediately became first-choice keeper, but on 15 October after just six games, he was recalled to the FCB team as back-up goalie. Basel won the last game of the season, on 8 May 2002 4–3 against Lugano, and became champions ten points clear at the top of the table. Just four days later they played in the cup final against Grasshopper Club winning 2–1 in extra time and thus they won the double, but König never came to any appearances.

König moved on to FC Zürich for the 2002–03 season and he played in 28 of the seasons 36 league matches, as Zürich the season in fifth position. He then left Switzerland and signed for Turkish Süper Lig club Elazığspor in 2003. The Czech Republic was König's next destination as he signed for Gambrinus liga club FC Baník Ostrava in 2004 before returning to Slovakia with MŠK Žilina in 2005. Greek side Panionios F.C. signed him in 2006 and he retired in the Summer of 2008 after making 31 appearances for the club, at the age of 36.

König was capped 43 times by the Slovak national team between 1997 and 2004.

== Honours ==
Slovan Bratislava

- Slovak League : 1995, 1996, 1999
- Slovak Cup : 1997, 1999
- Slovak Super Cup : 1995, 1996
- Ciudad de Cartagena Trophy : 1996

MŠK Žilina

- Slovak League runner-up: 2005

== Sources ==
- Die ersten 125 Jahre. Publisher: Josef Zindel im Friedrich Reinhardt Verlag, Basel. ISBN 978-3-7245-2305-5
- Verein "Basler Fussballarchiv" Homepage
