= Frédéric Besseyre =

French footballer (born 1979)

Personal information
- Full name: Frédéric Besseyre
- Date of birth: 2 May 1979 (age 47)
- Place of birth: France
- Height: 1.74 m (5 ft 8 1/2 in)
- Position: Forward

Team information
- Current team: FC Stade Nyonnais
- Number: 9

Senior career*
Years	Team	Apps	(Gls)
–2003	Étoile Carouge FC		
2003–2006	CS Chênois	15	(12)
2006–2007	Servette FC	21	(4)
2007–2009	CS Chênois	27	(22)
2009–	FC Stade Nyonnais	78	(42)
- * Club domestic league appearances and goals as of 10 July 2012

Frédéric Besseyre (born 2 May 1979) is a French footballer who plays for FC Stade Nyonnais in the Swiss Challenge League.
