= Sami Väisänen =

Finnish footballer (born 1973)

Personal information
- Date of birth: 9 May 1973 (age 53)
- Place of birth: Oulu, Finland
- Height: 1.75 m (5 ft 9 in)
- Position: Winger

Youth career
- 1984–1991: OTP

Senior career*
Years	Team	Apps	(Gls)
1990–1991	OTP	14	(0)
1992	FC Oulu	32	(10)
1993–1997	Haka	96	(17)
1998–2001	MyPa	99	(12)
2002	Lahti	8	(0)
2002	Hämeenlinna	2	(0)

International career
1992–1995	Finland U21	15	(2)
1995–1997	Finland	7	(0)
- * Club domestic league appearances and goals as of 14 May 2024

Sami Väisänen (born 9 May 1973) is a Finnish former professional footballer, who played as a winger. He was capped seven times for Finland national football team during 1995–1997. When playing for Haka, they won the Finnish championship title in 1995.

== Career statistics ==
Finland
Year	Apps	Goals
1995	1	0
1996	3	0
1997	3	0
Total	7	0

== Honours ==
Haka

- Veikkausliiga: 1995
