= Romain Crevoisier =

Swiss footballer (born 1965)

Personal information
- Full name: Romain Pierre Hubert Crevoisier
- Date of birth: 5 August 1965 (age 61)
- Place of birth: Moutier, Switzerland
- Height: 1.86 m (6 ft 1 in)
- Position: Goalkeeper

Team information
- Current team: FC Sion (goalkeeping coach)

Senior career*
| Years | Team | Apps | (Gls) |
| 1984–1987 | Grasshopper Club Zürich | 0 | (0) |
| 1987–1992 | FC La Chaux-de-Fonds | 50 | (0) |
| 1992–1996 | SR Delémont | 23 | (0) |
| 1996–1998 | SC Kriens | 50 | (0) |
| 1998–1999 | FC Lucerne | 23 | (0) |
| 1999–2000 | SC Kriens | 0 | (0) |
| 2000–2004 | FC Basel | 1 | (0) |
- * Club domestic league appearances and goals

Romain Crevoisier (born 5 August 1965) is a retired Swiss football goalkeeper who played in the late 1980s, 1990s and early 2000s. He is now a goalkeeping coach at FC Basel.

Crevoisier began playing professionally in 1987 with FC La Chaux-de-Fonds. He left for SR Delémont in 1992, and played there for four years before he signed for SC Kriens in 1996. In 1997, he was elected best goalkeeper in the Swiss championship. In 2000, he signed for FC Basel but was reserve goalkeeper for most of his time there. He retired from playing in 2004 and became FC Basel's goalkeeping coach in August 2005. In January 2013 he signed at FC Sion as a goalkeeping coach.
