= Admir Bilibani =

Swiss footballer (born 1979)

Personal information
- Date of birth: 17 November 1979 (age 46)
- Height: 1.81 m (5 ft 11 in)
- Position: Defender

Senior career*
Years	Team	Apps	(Gls)
1999	Stade Lausanne Ouchy	2	(0)
2000	Nyon	20	(1)
2000	Neuchâtel Xamax	3	(0)
2000	Vevey-Sports	4	(2)
2001–2002	Étoile Carouge	37	(0)
2002–2003	Lausanne-Sport	30	(0)
2003–2005	Yverdon-Sport	62	(1)
2005–2007	Aarau	62	(0)
2007–2008	Nea Salamina	11	(1)
2008	Baulmes	7	(1)
2008–2010	Lausanne-Sport	45	(0)
2010	Le Mont		
- * Club domestic league appearances and goals

Admir Bilibani (born 17 November 1979) is a Swiss former professional footballer who played as a defender.
