= Furo Iyenemi =

Nigerian footballer

Personal information
- Full name: Iyenemi Charles Furo
- Date of birth: 17 July 1978 (age 48)
- Place of birth: Okrika, Nigeria
- Height: 1.86 m (6 ft 1 in)
- Position: Defender

Youth career
- Sharks

Senior career*
| Years | Team | Apps | (Gls) |
| 1995–1997 | Paris Saint-Germain B | | |
| 1997–1999 | Waregem | 55 | (2) |
| 1999–2000 | Sion | 13 | (1) |
| 2000 | Royal Antwerp | 0 | (0) |
| 2000–2002 | Sion | 8 | (0) |
| 2003 | Akratitos | 7 | (1) |
| 2004–2005 | Istres | 0 | (0) |
| 2005–2006 | Servette | 5 | (0) |

International career
| 2000 | Nigeria U23 | 2 | (0) |
| 2000 | Nigeria | 5 | (0) |
- * Club domestic league appearances and goals

Furo Iyenemi (born 17 July 1978) is a retired Nigerian international footballer who played as a defender for clubs in France, Belgium, Switzerland and Greece.

== Club career ==
Born in Okrika, Iyenemi moved to France and began playing football for Paris Saint-Germain's reserve side in 1995. He signed a contract with Belgian Pro League club K.S.V. Waregem in 1997. He acquired Belgian citizenship and moved to Swiss Super League side FC Sion.

In January 2003, Iyenemi joined Super League Greece side Akratitos F.C., where he made 7 league appearances before leaving the club.

== International career ==
Iyenemi played for Nigeria at the 2000 Summer Olympics in Sydney. He captained the team as they reached the last eight of the tournament.

Iyenemi played for the Nigeria national football team at the 2000 African Cup of Nations finals, making five appearances as Nigeria finished runners-up.

== Personal life ==
His son, Kaye Furo, plays professional football in Belgium for Club Brugge KV.
