= Thierry Ebe =

Swiss footballer (born 1976)

Personal information
- Date of birth: 25 June 1976 (age 50)
- Place of birth: Switzerland
- Height: 1.83 m (6 ft 0 in)
- Position: Midfielder

Team information
- Current team: FC Bavois
- Number: 23

Senior career*
Years	Team	Apps	(Gls)
1997–1998	SR Delémont	118	(154)
1998–2002	Etoile Carouge FC		
2000	→ Yverdon-Sport FC (loan)		
2001	→ FC Basel (loan)		
2002–2003	SR Delémont		
2003–2005	FC Bulle		
2005–2006	FC Baulmes		
2006–2008	Lausanne-Sport		
2008–2009	FC Le Mont		
2010–	FC Bavois		
- * Club domestic league appearances and goals

Thierry Ebe (born 25 June 1976) is a Swiss footballer who currently plays for FC Bavois. He was voted as the international player of the decade in 2010.
