= Jean-Michel Tchouga =

Cameroonian footballer

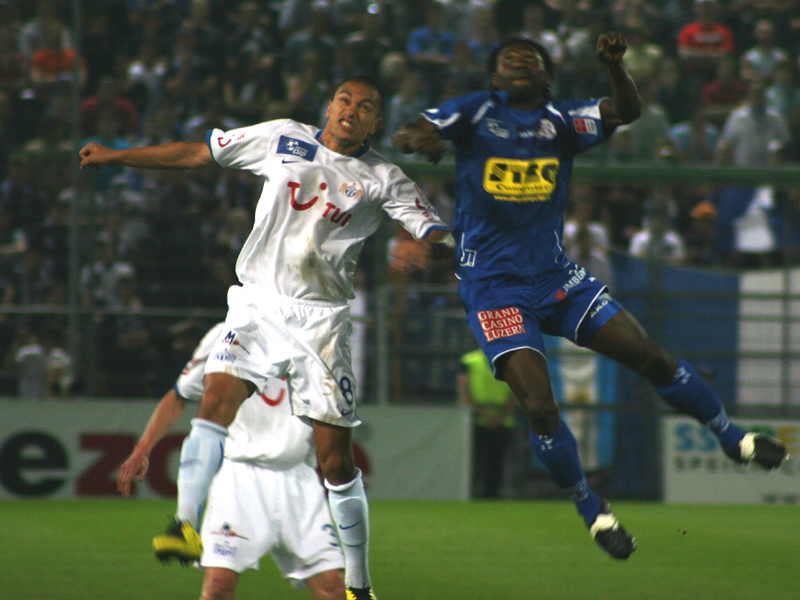
- Tchouga (right) in 2007.

Personal information
- Full name: Jean-Michel Tchouga
- Date of birth: December 20, 1978 (age 47)
- Place of birth: Cameroon
- Height: 1.74 m (5 ft 8 1/2 in)
- Position: Striker

Team information
- Current team: SC Kriens

Youth career
- –1997: KSA Yaoundé

Senior career*
Years	Team	Apps	(Gls)
1997–2000	Yverdon-Sport	59	(25)
2000–2003	FC Basel	47	(13)
2002	→ Lausanne-Sports (loan)	14	(2)
2003	→ FC Lugano (loan)	4	(0)
2003–2004	→ FC Concordia Basel (loan)	23	(11)
2004–2009	FC Luzern	135	(62)
2010	FC Wohlen	16	(5)
2010–2012	SC Kriens	35	(2)
2012–2014	FC Köniz		
2015	SC Düdingen		
2015–2016	FC Giffers-Tentlingen		
2016	FC Hochdorf		

International career
2007	Cameroon	1	(0)
- * Club domestic league appearances and goals

Jean-Michel Tchouga (born December 20, 1978) is a former footballer from Bafoussam in Cameroon. He played in the position as striker.

== Career ==
=== Early years ===
Tchouga played his youth football with local club KSA Yaoundé. He was scouted by Swiss team Yverdon-Sport and signed for them during the summer of 1997 joining their youth department. He advanced to their first team a year later under head coach Lucien Favre and achieved promotion with them at the end of the 1998–99 season. Tchouga stayed with YS and was a key-player as the team achieved the championship round of the 1999–2000. One of the most important games was on 2 October 1999 as Yverdon won 2–1 against Basel. The striker scored both goals and with his two goals, the then 20-year-old, made such a lasting impression on FCB coach Christian Gross that Basel signed him for the 2000/01 season.

=== Basel ===
Tschouga signed for FC Basel in the summer of 2000. He joined Basel's first team for their 2000–01 season under head coach Christian Gross. After playing in three test games, in which he scored four goals, Tschouga played his domestic league debut for his new team in the home game at the Stadion Schützenmatte on 15 July 2000. He scored his first league goal for his new team after just 12 minutes play and then in the second half went on to score flawless hat-trick, as Basel won 4–1 against Sion. After each goal, Tchouga performed an elegant little dance, wiggling his hips and waving and lowering his arms intact. This then became his trademark from then onwards. In the next home game he also scored a hat-trick, as Basel won 7–4 against Luzern. The team started somewhat irregularly into the season, a number of high scoring games, three victories, three defeats. They then gathered themselves and climbed to the top of the table. However, four defeats in the last five games, through them back to fifth position, at the end of the qualifying stage. Basel joined the 2000–01 UEFA Cup in the qualifying round, advancing with a 12–1 aggregate win over Folgore from San Marino. Tschouga scored a brace in the first leg, but was substituted out in the return leg, due to an injury. The team then celebrated a 7–6 aggregate victory over Norwegian Brann, Tschouga scored a goal in both legs, to advance to the second round. However, here the team lost their goal scoring qualities and were knocked out 3–1 on aggregate by Feyenoord. Tschouga scored the sole Basel goal. Basel were able to play their home games of the championship group in their new stadium, the St. Jakob-Park which opened on 15 March 2001 and it was sold out with 33,433 spectators on three occasions. However, Tschouga lost his goal scoring instinct, netted only once in the second half of the season and the team played eight draws in their 14 matches and so ended the championship in fourth position.

Basel played in the 2001 UEFA Intertoto Cup. Tschouga netted during their first game against Iceland's Grindavík, but not once after. Basel advanced to the final but were defeated by Aston Villa. During the first half of the 2001–02 league season Tschouga lost his place in the team, he was replaced by George Koumantarakis Hervé Tum and new signing Christian Giménez. Tschouga had ten appearances but did not find the target once. He was loaned out to Lausanne-Sport, in the second division, for the second half of the season.

Following his return, Tschouga was unable to gain a place in their first team and so played in Basel's U-21 team. Here he netted 13 times in 13 appearances. During the winter break of the 2002–03 season he was loaned out to Lugano but his stay there was short, as the club went bankrupt and were dissolved in April. For the 2003–04 season he was loaned to FC Concordia Basel, who at that time played in the second level. As his contract expired to an end of the season he was released. During his time with the club, Tschouga played a total of 83 games for Basel scoring a total of 35 goals. 47 of these games were in the Swiss Super League, five in the Swiss Cup, 11 in the UEFA competitions (UEFA Cup and UIC) and 20 were friendly games. He scored 13 goals in the domestic league, two in the cup, six in the European games and the other 14 were scored during the test games.

=== Luzern ===
In the summer of 2004 Tschouga signed for Luzern under head coach René van Eck, in the second tier, and here he rediscovered his form. In his first season he was the team's second top goal scorer with 17 goals, behind Paulo Vogt who netted 23 times. Thanks to the duo's goals the team reached the final of the 2004–05 Swiss Cup. Vogt left the club at the end of the season and was replaced by Edmond N'Tiamoah and the new duo, who had played together during their time in Basel, linked up well. To the beginning of the 2005–06 Challenge League season, the FCL lost three times in a row. Then Tschouga netted both goals in a 2–2 home draw against SC Kriens, which didn't turn the tide, but it did get the first point. FCL were not defeated again that season and they scored in each of the next 31 games. They rose to first place in the table and with 79 points, became division champions and achieved promotion. 45 of the 69 FCL goals were scored by the attacking duo, team captain Tchouga was the Challenge League top scorer with 27 goals, N'Tiamoah netted 18 times. The duo stayed with the club for the 2006–07 league season and were successful in reaching the 2006–07 Swiss Cup final and avoiding relegation.

=== Later years ===
He stayed with the club until the end of 2010. However, because towards the end of this time he had been demoted to the reserve team he moved on. He played six months for FC Wohlen and then moved on to SC Kriens. From summer 2012 he played as striker for FC Köniz. He ended his professional career and played for SC Düdingen, FC Giffers-Tentlingen and FC Hochdorf in the lower divisions.

== Private life ==
Tschouga lives in Kriens. He is coach in the youth department of FC Köniz. He is married and the couple have two daughters.

== Sources ==
- Die ersten 125 Jahre. Publisher: Josef Zindel im Friedrich Reinhardt Verlag, Basel. ISBN 978-3-7245-2305-5
- Verein "Basler Fussballarchiv" Homepage
