= Sébastien Lipawsky =

Swiss footballer (born 1977)

Personal information
- Date of birth: 15 December 1977 (age 48)
- Place of birth: Sion, Switzerland
- Height: 1.77 m (5 ft 10 in)
- Position: Midfielder

Senior career*
Years	Team	Apps	(Gls)
1996–1999	FC Sion		
1999–2001	FC Luzern		
2001–2005	Étoile Carouge FC		
- * Club domestic league appearances and goals

Sébastien Lipawsky (born 15 December 1977) is a retired Swiss football midfielder.
