= Massimo Lombardo =

Swiss footballer (born 1973)

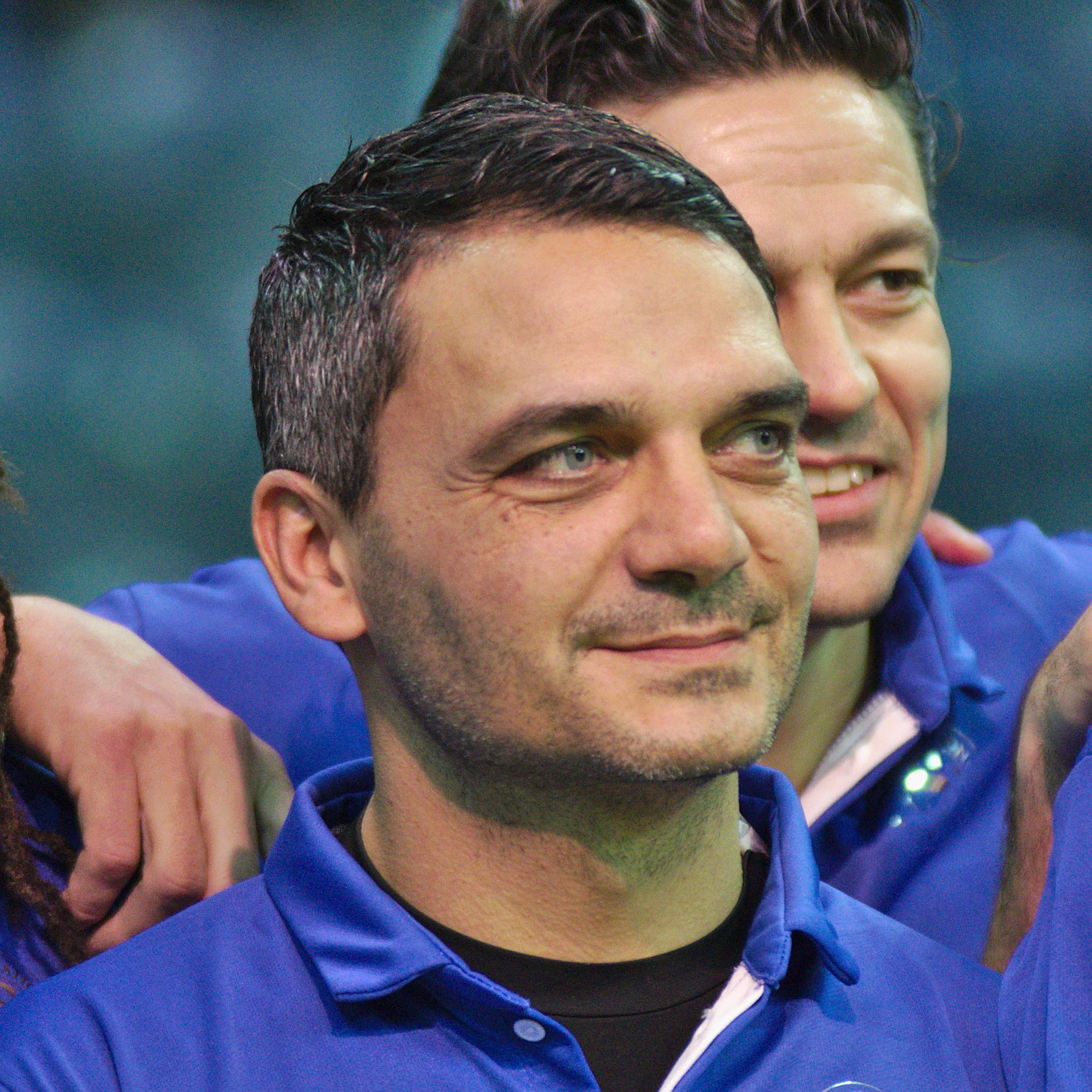

Personal information
- Full name: Massimo Lombardo
- Date of birth: 9 January 1973 (age 53)
- Place of birth: Bellinzona, Switzerland
- Height: 1.74 m (5 ft 8 1/2 in)
- Position: Midfielder

Team information
- Current team: Servette FC (Academy manager)

Senior career*
Years	Team	Apps	(Gls)
1990–1992	AC Bellinzona	26	(1)
1992–1997	Grasshopper Club Zürich	116	(8)
1997–1998	AC Perugia	24	(3)
1998–2000	FC Lugano	36	(2)
2000–2001	Lausanne-Sports	48	(5)
2002–2004	Servette FC	66	(5)
2005	FC Meyrin	11	(1)
2005–2007	Neuchâtel Xamax FC	67	(6)
2007–2009	Nyon	51	(8)

International career
	Switzerland	15	(1)

Managerial career
- 2007–2012: Nyon (youth)
- 2012–2015: Servette FC (youth)
- 2015–2017: Switzerland (U15 & U16)
- 2017–2019: FC Basel (Assistant coach)
- 2019–: Servette FC (Academy manager)
- * Club domestic league appearances and goals

Massimo Lombardo (born 9 January 1973) is a former Swiss international footballer. He is currently the academy manager of Swiss side Servette FC.

== Senior career ==
Lombardo has played over 300 games in the Swiss Super League. He started his career at Canton Ticino's team AC Bellinzona and moved to Grasshopper Club Zürich where he stayed for five seasons, his longest club cap. After a season at Serie B club AC Perugia, he moved back to Switzerland with stuns at FC Lugano, Lausanne-Sports and Servette FC. He then briefly played for FC Meyrin in 2004–05 Swiss Challenge League (Switzerland's second division) season before moving back to the Super League with Neuchâtel Xamax FC, but failed to avoid relegation to Challenge League.

In summer 2008, he joined FC Stade Nyonnais, newly promoted to Challenge League from 1. Liga, where he retired as a professional footballer in June 2009.

== Managerial career ==
In 2017, Lombardo was named assistant manager of Swiss side FC Basel.

He then joined Servette FC's academy as its manager in 2019, his current position.
