= Hervé Tum =

Cameroonian footballer (born 1979)

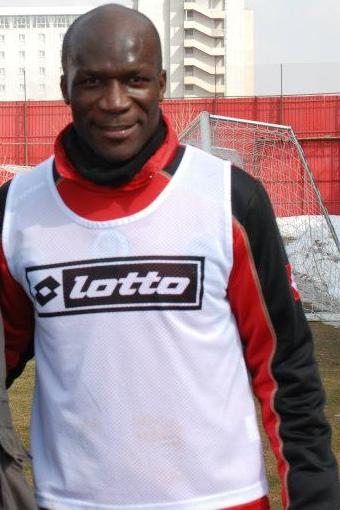

Personal information
- Full name: Hervé Germain Tum
- Date of birth: 15 February 1979 (age 47)
- Place of birth: Yaoundé, Cameroon
- Height: 1.83 m (6 ft 0 in)
- Position: Forward

Youth career
- –1998: Pacy Football

Senior career*
Years	Team	Apps	(Gls)
1998–2000	Sion	42	(10)
2000–2004	Basel	96	(23)
2004–2006	Metz	52	(12)
2006–2007	RC Strasbourg	29	(7)
2007–2008	Bursaspor	28	(6)
2008–2009	Sivasspor	31	(10)
2009–2011	Istanbul B.B.	44	(17)
2011–2012	Gençlerbirliği	30	(15)
2012–2013	Elazığspor	13	(1)
2013	Göztepe	15	(3)

International career
2004–2009	Cameroon	6	(0)
- * Club domestic league appearances and goals

Hervé Tum (born 15 February 1979) is a Cameroonian former professional footballer who played as forward.

== Club career ==
Tum was born in Yaoundé. He moved from Cameroon to Pacy-sur-Eure in North-western France during the 1990s. He joined the youth of local amateur club Pacy Football. He was scouted by Swiss Super League team Sion and signed for them in the summer of 1998. He had only a few appearances during his first season with them, but at the end of the season the team suffered relegation. During his second season he advanced to becoming a regular starter and at the end of the 1999–2000 season he achieved promotion with the club.

During the winter break of the 2000–01 season, FC Basel bought Tum out of his contract for a reported two million Swiss Francs. He joined Basel's first team during their 2000–01 season under head coach Christian Gross. Basel were able to play their home games of the championship group in their new stadium, the St. Jakob-Park which opened on 15 March 2001 and it was sold out with 33,433 spectators on three occasions. After playing in eight test games Tum played his team debut for the club in the Swiss Cup away game on 18 February 2001 as Basel won against Etoile Carouge. He played his domestic league debut for his new club in the away game in the Charmilles Stadium on 25 February as Basel were defeated 3–0 by Servette. He scored his first goal for his new club in the home game in the St. Jakob-Park on 18 March. In fact he scored Basel's first and their last goals as they won 4–1 against Lugano. Tum played in all 14 games scoring four goals. But the team played eight draws in their 14 matches and so ended the season in fourth position.

Basel played in the 2001 UEFA Intertoto Cup. Basel advanced to the final but were defeated by Aston Villa. Tum played in six of the eight games scoring three goals. The league season started in the worst possible way. In their first game away against FC Sion, Basel suffered a humiliating 8–1 defeat. After suffering three more away defeats against Zürich, Neuchâtel Xamax and Grasshopper Club the team then found themselves, winning nine of the next eleven games. Basel them ended the qualification phase as league leaders, five points ahead of Lugano. Basel started well into the second part of the season and during this period FCB played their best football, pulling away at the top of the table and subsequently achieved the championship title prematurely. Basel won the last game of the season, on 8 May 2002, and became champions ten points clear at the top of the table. Just four days later they played in the cup final against Grasshopper Club winning 2–1 after extra time, Tum scored his sides first goal. They thus won the double.

Basel's 2002–03 UEFA Champions League season started in the second qualifying round. After beating Žilina 4–1 on aggregate and Celtic on the away goals rule after a 3–3 aggregate, Basel advanced to the group stage. They ended this in second position behind Valencia, but ahead of Liverpool and Spartak Moscow to advance to the second group stage. They ended this in third position behind Manchester United and Juventus, but ahead of Deportivo La Coruña. Tum played in 14 of these 16 European games. Basel ended their league season as runners-up, but in the cup they advanced to the final and here they beat Neuchâtel Xamax 6–0 to defend the title that they had won a season earlier. Tum played in the first four cup games, but missed the final due to an injury.

As cup winners Basel were qualified for the UEFA Cup first round and here they beat Malatyaspor 3–2 on aggregate due to the silver goal rule. However, in the second round they lost both games against Newcastle United. In their 2003–04 league season the team started well, winning their first 13 matches straight out. The first defeat came on matchday 24. Basel won the championship with 26 victories and seven draws, the team had suffered just three away defeats, and obtained 85 points. Tum had 23 appearances, scoring seven goals.

Tum's contract was not extended and he left the club at the end of the season. During his three and a half years with them, Tum played a total of 185 games for Basel scoring a total of 59 goals. 96 of these games were in the Swiss Super League, 14 in the Swiss Cup, 23 in the UEFA competitions (Champions League, UEFA Cup and UIC) and 52 were friendly games. He scored 23 goals in the domestic league, five in the cup, three in the European games and the other 28 were scored during the test games.

Tum joined Metz on a free transfer for their 2004–05 season, immediately becoming a regular starter. After two years with them he moved on to play one season for Strasbourg.

Tum played for Bursaspor in the 2007–08 season after playing for Strasbourg. In the 2008, he joined Sivasspor and left in 2009 for Istanbul B.B. At the end of 2010–11 season, he was released by Istanbul B.B. and transferred to Gençlerbirliği.

== Career statistics ==
=== International ===
Cameroon
Year	Apps	Goals
2004	4	0
2005	1	0
2009	1	0
Total	6	0

== Honors ==
Basel

- Swiss Championship: 2001–02, 2003–04
- Swiss Cup: 2001–02, 2002–03

== Sources ==
- Rotblau: Jahrbuch Saison 2017/2018. Publisher: FC Basel Marketing AG. ISBN 978-3-7245-2189-1
- Die ersten 125 Jahre. Publisher: Josef Zindel im Friedrich Reinhardt Verlag, Basel. ISBN 978-3-7245-2305-5
- Verein "Basler Fussballarchiv" Homepage
