= Charles Amoah =

Ghanaian footballer

Personal information
- Date of birth: 28 February 1975 (age 51)
- Place of birth: Accra, Ghana
- Height: 1.70 m (5 ft 7 in)
- Position: Striker

Senior career*
Years	Team	Apps	(Gls)
1994–1995	Okwawu United		(9)
1995–1996	FC Winterthur	2	(1)
1996–1998	FC Frauenfeld		
1998–1999	FC Wil	33	(20)
1999–2001	St. Gallen	56	(37)
2001–2003	Sturm Graz	72	(17)
2003–2004	Austria Salzburg	5	(1)
2004–2006	ASK Kottingbrunn		
2006–2007	LASK	1	(0)
Total		169	(85)

International career
1999–2003	Ghana	15	(10)
- * Club domestic league appearances and goals

Charles Amoah (born 28 February 1975) is a Ghanaian former professional footballer who played as a striker.

== Career ==
Born in Accra, Amoah played for Okwawu United, FC Winterthur, FC Frauenfeld, FC Wil, St. Gallen, Sturm Graz, Austria Salzburg, ASK Kottingbrunn and LASK.

Amoah was top scorer in the 1999–2000 Nationalliga A, contributing 25 goals to St. Gallen's title-winning season. At St. Gallen he also memorably scored one of the goals and provided an assist as they overturned a 1–0 first-leg deficit to win 2–0 in the second leg and eliminate Premier League side Chelsea from the 2000–01 UEFA Cup.

Following Amoah's successes at St. Gallen, Austrian Bundesliga club Sturm Graz paid a transfer fee of 6.5 million Swiss francs (about €4.3 million) to sign him.

He earned 15 caps for the Ghana national team between 1999 and 2003, scoring 10 goals.
