= Feliciano Magro =

Italian-Swiss footballer (born 1979)

Felix Magro
Personal information
- Full name: Feliciano Magro
- Date of birth: 2 February 1979 (age 47)
- Place of birth: Zürich, Switzerland
- Height: 1.82 m (6 ft 0 in)
- Position: Midfielder

Senior career*
Years	Team	Apps	(Gls)
1997–2000	Grasshopper	32	(1)
2000–2003	Udinese	0	(0)
2000–2001	→ Basel (loan)	31	(5)
2001–2002	→ Zürich (loan)	31	(4)
2003–2004	Grasshopper	17	(2)
2004	Landskrona	7	(1)
2005–2007	Djurgården	24	(1)
2006–2007	→ Lugano (loan)	16	(3)
2008	Norrköping	24	(2)
2009	Grasshopper	5	(0)
2010–2011	Chiasso	36	(4)
2011–2012	Mendrisio	15	(5)

International career
- Switzerland U18
1999–2000	Italy U20	3	(0)
- * Club domestic league appearances and goals as of End of 2010–11 season

Feliciano "Felix" Magro (born 2 February 1979) is a former footballer. Born in Switzerland, he represented both that nation and Italy at youth international levels.

Magro's father is from Capo d'Orlando, Sicily and his mother is from Lucerne.

== Career ==
Magro was signed by Udinese in January 2000, signing a contract until 2004. He was loaned back to Switzerland, first to FC Basel and then to FC Zürich, but he broken his leg in 2002 and had to rest for a year.

He came to Djurgårdens IF on free transfer from Landskrona BoIS at the start of the 2005 season, and he returned from a loan to AC Lugano. In late 2007, when his contract with DIF had run out, he signed a three-year contract with IFK Norrköping. In January 2009, he terminated his contract with the club. and joined Grasshopper Club Zürich.

After a few months without a team, he left for 1.Liga side Chiasso in April 2010 and won promotion back to the Challenge League.

=== International ===
A Swiss youth international, Magro chose to represent Italy in 1999. He played for the Italy U20 team at the 2000 Toulon Tournament.

== Honours ==
Djurgårdens

- Allsvenskan: 2005
