= 1997–98 FC Zürich season =

FC Zürich
1997–98 season
- Owner: Sven Hotz
- Chairman: Sven Hotz
- Head-coach: Raimondo Ponte
- Stadium: Letzigrund
- 1997–98 NLA Qualification round: 6th of 12
- 1997–98 NLA Championship group: 4th of 8
- 1997–98 Swiss Cup: Round 6
- Top goalscorer: League: Shabani Nonda (24); All: Shabani Nonda (24)

The 1997–98 season was FC Zürich's 101st season in their existence, since their foundation in 1896. It was their eighth consecutive season in the top flight of Swiss football, following their promotion at the end of 1989–90 season.

== Overview ==
The local businessman Sven Hotz was the club's chairman and patron at this time. He had taken over as club president at the AGM in 1986. Raimondo Ponte had been the FCZ first team head-coach during the previous seasons and he had prolonged his contract with the club for this season. The FCZ first team competed in this years domestic first-tier 1997–98 Nationalliga A with the clear intention of retaining their top level status and reaching the championship group for the second half of the season. The team also competed in 1997–98 Swiss Cup. They had not qualified for any of the UEFA European tournaments and they did not enter the 1997 Intertoto Cup. Their aim this season was to reach the top three of the league and thus qualify for the 1998–99 UEFA Cup or to win the domestic cup competition.

FCZ played their home games in the Letzigrund, a stadium also used by the athletics club LC Zürich. The stadium originally opened in 1925, was partially rebuilt in 1973 and modernised during the previous and this season. The stadium is located in the west of Zurich in the district of Altstetten, which is about three kilometers from the city center.

At the end of the league season FCZ found themselves in fourth position in the table and so they had failed to reach third place which was the qualification slot for the 1998–99 UEFA Cup. One week later the Swiss Cup final took place and Lausanne-Sport won the trophy by beating St. Gallen after a penalty shoot-out. Thus Lausanne qualified for the 1998–99 UEFA Cup Winners' Cup. As Lausanne were in third position in the final league table, the UEFA Cup slot was passed down to the next placed team and FCZ qualified.

== Players ==
The following is the list of the FCZ first team squad this season. It also includes players that were in the squad the day the domestic league season started, on 5 July 1997, but subsequently left the club after that date.

Note: Flags indicate national team as defined under FIFA eligibility rules; some limited exceptions apply. Players may hold more than one non-FIFA nationality.

No.	Pos.	Nation	Player
—	GK	SUI	Ueli Brunner (league games: 4)
—	GK	NIG	Ike Shorunmu (league games: 33)
—	DF	SUI	Pascal Castillo (league games: 9)
—	DF	SUI	Urs Fischer (league games: 33)
—	DF	SUI	Giuseppe Gambino (league games: 17)
—	DF	SUI	Marc Hodel (league games: 23)
—	DF	SUI	Robert Huber (league games: 24)
—	DF	BIH	Muhamed Konjic (league games: 7)
—	DF	COD	David Opango (league games: 19)
—	DF	SUI	Carmelo Trande (league games: 1)
—	DF	SUI	René Weiler (league games: 10)
—	MF	SUI	Alijosa Aleksandrovic (league games: 1)
—	MF	ITA	Roberto Baldassarri (league games: 29)

No.	Pos.	Nation	Player
—	MF	SUI	Renato Brugnoli (league games: 30)
—	MF	SUI	Francesco Di Jorio (league games: 35)
—	MF	FRA	Jean-Marc Ferreri (league games: 7)
—	MF	CZE	Martin Guzik (league games: 18)
—	MF	ITA	Luca Iodice (league games: 17)
—	MF	BRA	Cesar Sant'Anna (league games: 35)
—	MF	SUI	Bruno Sutter (league games: 17)
—	MF	SUI	Daniel Tarone (league games: 34)
—	MF	SUI	Julio Tejeda (league games: 28)
—	FW	BRA	Eduardo Dos Santos «Edu» (league games: 3)
—	FW	TRI	Jerren Nixon (league games: 10)
—	FW	COD	Shabani Nonda (league games: 34)
—	FW	NIG	Rashidi Yekini (league games: 28)

Players who left the squad

The following is the list of the FCZ first team players that left the squad during the previous season or in the off-season, before the new domestic season began.

Note: Flags indicate national team as defined under FIFA eligibility rules; some limited exceptions apply. Players may hold more than one non-FIFA nationality.

No.	Pos.	Nation	Player
—	GK	SUI	Patrick Mäder (retired)
—	DF	SUI	Giuseppe Mazzarelli (to Grasshopper Club)
—	DF	SUI	Kazik Nicolò (reserves)
—	DF	SUI	David Pallas (reserves)
—	MF	ITA	Giuseppe Nocita (reserves)
—	MF	SUI	Jürg Studer (to Young Boys)

No.	Pos.	Nation	Player
—	MF	POL	Dariusz Szubert (to K.F.C. Lommel S.K.)
—	FW	NOR	Jørn Andersen (to Lugano)
—	FW	SWE	Tomas Brolin (end of loan, returned to Leeds Utd)
—	FW	BIH	Marko Topić (to Wil)
—	FW	ENG	Roger Walker (to Hibernians)

== Results ==
Legend

Win Draw Loss Postponed

=== Nationalliga A ===
==== Qualification phase ====
The first stage of the NLA began on 5 July 1997 and was completed on 7 December. The top eight teams in the qualification phase would advance to the championship group and the last four teams would play against relegation.

5 July 1997 Round 1	Zürich	1–0	Luzern	Letzigrund, Zürich
19:30	Guzik (yellow card) 32'; Nonda 67' (1:0)	FCZ summary	(yellow card) 77' Sawu	Attendance: 5,800; Referee: (Switzerland) Urs Meier (Wettingen and Würenlos)

9 July 1997 Round 2	Étoile Carouge	1–3	Zürich	Stade de la Fontenette, Carouge
19:30	Orlando (yellow card) 19'; Van der Laan 78' (1:2); Cravero (yellow card) 86'; Hilty (yellow card) 90+1'	FCZ summary	(yellow card) 4' Weiler; (yellow card) 10' Di Jorio; 31' (0:1) Konjic; (yellow card) 42' Castillo; 72' (0:2) Brugnoli; 84' (1:3) Gambino	Attendance: 2,350; Referee: (Switzerland) Guido Wildhaber (Kerzers)

12 July 1997 Round 3	Zürich	1–1	Aarau	Letzigrund, Zürich
19:30	Nonda (yellow card) 24'; Konjic (yellow card) 48'; Fischer (yellow card) 55'; Konjic 64' (1:1)	FCZ summary FCA summary	(yellow card) 8' B. Studer; 36' (0:1) Drakopulos; (yellow card) 42' Wiederkehr; (yellow card) 73' de Napoli	Attendance: 6,300; Referee: (Switzerland) Kurt Zuppinger (Bremgarten, Aargau)

19 July 1997 Round 4	Lausanne-Sport	4–1	Zürich	Olympique de la Pontaise, Lausanne
19:30	Celestini (yellow card) 2'; Puce 17' (1:0); Londono (yellow card) 32'; Puce (yellow card) 65'; Rehn 67' (2:0); Celestini 76' (pen.); Piffaretti (yellow card) 88'; Udovič 90' (4:1)	FCZ summary	(yellow card) 42' Fischer; 75' (2:1) Nonda	Attendance: 7,100; Referee: (Switzerland) Massimo Busacca (Monte Carasso/Bellinzona)

26 July 1997 Round 5	Zürich	0–0	Basel	Letzigrund, Zürich
19:30	Tarone (yellow card) 59'; Tejeda (yellow card) 70'; Yekini (yellow card) 89'	FCZ summary FCB summary	(yellow card) 17' Zuffi	Attendance: 15,500; Referee: (Liechtenstein) Roland Beck (Triesenberg)

3 August 1997 Round 6	Zürich	1–0	Kriens	Letzigrund, Zürich
16:00	Konjic 47' (1:0); Di Jorio (yellow card) 86'	FCZ summary	(yellow card) 73' Schwizer	Attendance: 6,100; Referee: (Switzerland) Nicolas Daina

10 August 1997 Round 7	Servette	4–1	Zürich	Charmilles Stadium, Geneva
16:00	Ouadja (yellow card) 23'; Salou 44' (1:0); Juarez 65' (2:1); Ouadja 83' (3:1); Pizzinat (yellow card) 85'; Sesa 88' (4:1)	FCZ summary	(yellow card) 21' Sant'Anna; 62' (1:1) Castillo; (yellow card) 74' Bruno Sutter	Attendance: 4,500; Referee: (Switzerland) Dieter Schoch (Attiswil)

22 August 1997 Round 8	Zürich	0–0	Sion	Letzigrund, Zürich
19:30	Ponte (not on the pitch) (red card) 84'	FCZ summary	(yellow card) 61' Wolf; (yellow card) 90' Milton	Attendance: 5,300; Referee: (Switzerland) Serge Muhmenthaler (Grenchen)
Note: FCZ head-coach Raimondo Ponte was sent to the stands in the 84th minute for complaining.

31 August 1997 Round 9	St. Gallen	1–1	Zürich	Espenmoos, St. Gallen
16:00	Contini 9' (1:0); Contini (yellow card) 45'; Dal Santo (yellow card) 53'; Sene (yellow card) 61'	FCZ summary	(yellow card) 18' Tejeda; 23' (1:1) Yekini; (yellow card) 45' Fischer; (yellow card) 80' Brugnoli	Attendance: 12,000; Referee: (Switzerland) Massimo Busacca (Monte Carasso/Bellinzona)

14 September 1997 Round 10	Xamax	1–1	Zürich	Stade de la Maladière, Neuchâtel
19:30	Martinović 26' (pen.); Sandjak (yellow card) 40'; Martinović (yellow card) 80'	FCZ summary	(yellow card) 34' Brugnoli; (yellow card) 50' Ferreri; (yellow card) 57' Sant'Anna; 85' (1:1) Tarone; (yellow card) 89' Tarone	Attendance: 6,600; Referee: (Switzerland) Claude Detruche, (Thônex)

21 September 1997 Round 11	Zürich	1–2	Grasshopper Club	Letzigrund, Zürich
19:30	Tejeda (yellow card) 15'; Gambino (yellow card) 40'; Yekini 51' (1:1); Ferreri (yellow card) 64'	FCZ summary	5' (0:1) Moldovan; 74' (1:2) Türkyilmaz; (yellow card) 79' Thüler	Attendance: 17,000; Referee: (Switzerland) Kurt Zuppinger (Bremgarten, Aargau)

24 September 1997 Round 12	Luzern	2–2	Zürich	Stadion Allmend, Luzern
19:30	Koilov (yellow card) 15' (yellow-red card) 68'; Fink 38' (1:2); Aleksandrov 56' (2:2); Aleksandrov (yellow card) 66'	FCZ summary	3' (0:1) Nonda; 25' (0:2) Di Jorio; (yellow card) 69' Tarone	Attendance: 6,630; Referee: (Switzerland) Andreas Schluchter (Schönenbuch)

27 September 1997 Round 13	Zürich	3–0	Étoile Carouge	Letzigrund, Zürich
19:30	Yekini 31' (pen.); Fischer (yellow card) 43'; Nonda 54' (2:0); Nonda 89' (3:0)	FCZ summary	(yellow card) 11' Millereau	Attendance: 3,200; Referee: (Switzerland) Dominique Tavel (Lonay)

4 October 1997 Round 14	Aarau	1–0	Zürich	Stadion Brügglifeld, Aarau
19:30	Roembiak 29' (1:0)	FCZ summary FCA summary	(yellow card) 65' Sant'Anna; (yellow card) 90+1' Brugnoli	Attendance: 3,900; Referee: (Switzerland) Markus Nobs (Wohlen bei Bern)

19 October 1997 Round 15	Basel	3–3	Zürich	St. Jakob Stadium, Basel
14:30	Kreuzer 11'; Hartmann (yellow card) 30'; Zuffi 44'; Subiat 88'	FCZ summary FCB summary	29' Nonda; 73' Tarone; 90' (yellow card) 47' Hodel	Attendance: 9,500; Referee: (Switzerland) Urs Meier (Wettingen and Würenlos)

25 October 1997 Round 16	Zürich	0–0	Lausanne-Sport	Letzigrund, Zürich
17:30	Ferreri (yellow card) 78'	FCZ summary	(yellow card) 76' Nkufo	Attendance: 3,500; Referee: (Switzerland) Claude Detruche, (Thônex)

2 November 1997 Round 17	Kriens	1–1	Zürich	Stadion Kleinfeld, Kriens
14:30	Gross 2' (1:0); Colatrella (yellow card) 7'; Bonnafous (yellow card) 28' (yellow-red card) 90'	FCZ summary	(yellow card) 24' Fischer; 57' (1:1) Guzik	Attendance: 4,000; Referee: (Switzerland) Massimo Busacca (Monte Carasso/Bellinzona)

8 November 1997 Round 18	Zürich	2–1	Servette	Letzigrund, Zürich
17:30	Opango 6' (1:0); Opango (yellow card) 12'; Nonda 30' (2:0); Ferreri (yellow card) 80'	FCZ summary	(yellow card) 29' Cantaluppi; 57' (o.g.) (Fischer); (yellow card) 60' Müller	Attendance: 3,900; Referee: (Switzerland) Andreas Schluchter (Schönenbuch)

19 November 1997 Round 19	Sion	3–1	Zürich	Stade Tourbillon, Sion
19:30	Milton 38' (1:0); Veiga (yellow card) 55'; Tholot 80' (2:1); Ouattara 84' (3:1); Grichting (yellow card) 87'	FCZ summary	(yellow card) 15' Tejeda; (yellow card) 35' Di Jorio; (yellow card) 48' Fischer; 69' (1:1) Nonda	Attendance: 6,000; Referee: (Switzerland) Kurt Zuppinger (Bremgarten, Aargau)

23 November 1997 Round 20	Zürich	4–0	St. Gallen	Letzigrund, Zürich
14:30	Di Jorio (yellow card) 10'; Nonda 14' (1:0); Guzik 29' (2:0); Nonda 45' (3:0); Opango (yellow card) 71'; Guzik (yellow card) 74'; Tarone (yellow card) 80'; Bruno Sutter 85' (4:0)	FCZ summary	(yellow card) 17' Hellinga; (yellow card) 36' Tsawa	Attendance: 6,800; Referee: (Switzerland) Nicolas Daina

30 November 1997 Round 21	Zürich	3–0	Xamax	Letzigrund, Zürich
14:30	Fischer (yellow card) 10'; Nonda (yellow card) 45'; Tarone 48' (1:0); Gambino 77' (2:0); Nonda 81' (3:0)	FCZ summary	(yellow card) 77' Corminbœuf	Attendance: 8,100; Referee: (Switzerland) Claude Detruche, (Thônex)

7 December 1997 Round 22	Grasshopper Club	3–1	Zürich	Hardturm, Zürich
14:30	Türkyilmaz (yellow card); Türkyilmaz 32' (1:0); Esposito 42' (2:0); Esposito (yellow card) 53'; Moldovan 55' (3:0); (yellow card) 59' Haas	FCZ summary	58' (3:1) Di Jorio; (yellow card) 64' Huber; (yellow card) 68' (yellow-red card) 89' Sant'Anna; (red card) 71' Nixon	Attendance: 13,400; Referee: (Switzerland) Carlo Bertolini (Vira-Gambarogno)

==== Qualification table ====
Pos	Team	Pld	W	D	L	GF	GA	GD	Pts	Qualification
1	Grasshopper Club	22	14	4	4	59	23	+36	46	Advance to championship round halved points (rounded up) as bonus
2	Lausanne-Sport	22	12	6	4	45	27	+18	42	Advance to championship round halved points (rounded up) as bonus
3	Servette	22	11	6	5	45	33	+12	39	Advance to championship round halved points (rounded up) as bonus
4	Aarau	22	10	5	7	38	31	+7	35	Advance to championship round halved points (rounded up) as bonus
5	St. Gallen	22	7	9	6	38	34	+4	30	Advance to championship round halved points (rounded up) as bonus
6	Zürich	22	7	9	6	31	28	+3	30	Advance to championship round halved points (rounded up) as bonus
7	Sion	22	7	9	6	30	27	+3	30	Advance to championship round halved points (rounded up) as bonus
8	Luzern	22	7	8	7	26	28	−2	29	Advance to championship round halved points (rounded up) as bonus
9	Xamax	22	7	5	10	37	39	−2	26	Continue to promotion/relegation round
10	Kriens	22	5	7	10	23	41	−18	22	Continue to promotion/relegation round
11	Basel	22	5	4	13	28	46	−18	19	Continue to promotion/relegation round
12	Étoile Carouge	22	1	6	15	20	63	−43	9	Continue to promotion/relegation round

Source: rsssf.com
Rules for classification: 1) Points; 2) Goal difference; 3) Goals scored; 4) Head-to-head points; 5) Away goals scored; 6) Draw.

==== Championship group ====
The first eight teams of the qualification phase competed in the Championship round. The teams took half of the points (rounded up to complete units) gained in the qualification as bonus with them. The championship phase began on 1 March 1998 and was completed on 23 May.

1 March 1998 Round 1	Zürich	4–0	Sion	Letzigrund, Zürich
14:30	Hodel (yellow card) 13'; Yekini 22' (1:0); Yekini 24' (2:0); Yekini 38' (3:0); Nonda 54' (4:0)	FCZ summary	(yellow card) 10' Gaspoz; (yellow card) 19' Quentin; (yellow card) 75' Seoane	Attendance: 3,800; Referee: (Switzerland) Andreas Schluchter (Schönenbuch)

8 March 1998 Round 2	Luzern	2–2	Zürich	Stadion Allmend, Luzern
14:30	Ibrahim 9' (1:0); Merenda (yellow card) 32'; Ibrahim 44' (2:0); Knez (yellow card) 61'; Wyss (yellow card) 63'	FCZ summary	(yellow card) 38' Huber; (red card) 44' Nonda; 56' (2:1) Di Jorio; 81' (2:2) Yekini	Attendance: 7,150; Referee: (Switzerland) Nicolas Daina
Note: FCZ lodged a protest against Nonda's sending-off.

15 March 1998 Round 3	Zürich	0–2	Grasshopper Club	Letzigrund, Zürich
14:30	Sant'Anna (yellow card) 64'; Huber (yellow card) 77'; Brugnoli (yellow card) 90'	FCZ summary	28' (0:1) Subiat; (yellow card) 31' Subiat; (yellow card) 32' Vogel; (yellow card) 47' Comisetti; 85' (o.g.) (Huber)	Attendance: 21,200; Referee: (Switzerland) Urs Meier (Wettingen and Würenlos)
Note: The game started 10 minutes late due to a large crowd of spectators arriving late.

21 March 1998 Round 4	Lausanne-Sport	1–2	Zürich	Olympique de la Pontaise, Lausanne
17:30	Londono (red card) 38'; Puce 42' (1:1); Celestini (yellow card) 61'	FCZ summary	(yellow card) 13' Opango; (yellow card) 26' Hodel; 39' (pen.) Nonda; (yellow card) 72' Di Jorio; 81' (1:2) Baldassarri	Attendance: 5,200; Referee: (Switzerland) Carlo Bertolini (Vira-Gambarogno)

28 March 1998 Round 5	Zürich	3–0	St. Gallen	Letzigrund, Zürich
18:00	Yekini 27' (1:0); Yekini 40' (2:0); Nonda 51' (pen.); Hodel (yellow card) 61'; Nonda (yellow card) 65'; Huber (yellow card) 79'	FCZ summary	(yellow card) 28' Dal Santo; (yellow card) 56' Vidallé; (yellow card) 77' Zellweger	Attendance: 7,200; Referee: (Switzerland) Dieter Schoch (Attiswil)

5 April 1998 Round 6	Servette	1–1	Zürich	Charmilles Stadium, Geneva
14:30	(Hodel) 76' (o.g.)	FCZ summary	(yellow card) 42' Di Jorio; 60' (0:1) Nonda; (yellow card) 90' Shorunmu	Attendance: 7,000; Referee: (Switzerland) Massimo Busacca (Monte Carasso/Bellinzona)

8 April 1998 Round 7	Zürich	3–2	Aarau	Letzigrund, Zürich
19:30	Yekini 3' (1:0); Opango 53' (2:1); Nonda 67' (3:1); Fischer (yellow card) 70'	FCZ summary FCA summary	4' (1:1) De Napoli; (yellow card) 54' Wiederkehr; 70' (3:2) Aloisi; (yellow card) 70' Aloisi	Attendance: 5,600; Referee: (Switzerland) Claude Detruche, (Thônex)

19 April 1998 Round 8	Aarau	1–2	Zürich	Stadion Brügglifeld, Aarau
16:00	Pavličević (yellow card) 42'; Previtali (yellow card) 64' (Fischer) 90' (o.g.)	FCZ summary FCA summary	20' (0:1) Nonda; 68' (0:2) Nonda	Attendance: 3,500; Referee: (Switzerland) Urs Meier (Wettingen and Würenlos)

25 April 1998 Round 9	Zürich	1–1	Servette	Letzigrund, Zürich
19:30	Yekini 75' (pen.); Weiler (yellow card) 90'	FCZ summary	(yellow card) 17' Pizzinat; 31' (0:1) Paisley; (yellow card) 58' Juarez; (yellow card) 69' Fournier; (yellow card) 74' Barea; (yellow card) 75' Karlen	Attendance: 16,500; Referee: (Liechtenstein) Roland Beck (Triesenberg)

29 April 1998 Round 10	St. Gallen	0–0	Zürich	Espenmoos, St. Gallen
19:30	Hellinga (yellow card) 59'	FCZ summary	(yellow card) 20' Opango; (yellow card) 57' Di Jorio	Attendance: 9,600; Referee: (Switzerland) Claude Detruche, (Thônex)

2 May 1998 Round 11	Zürich	2–2	Lausanne-Sport	Letzigrund, Zürich
19:30	Tejeda (yellow card) 9'; Sant'Anna (yellow card) 40'; Nonda 42' (1:0); Nixon 79' (2:2); Fischer (yellow card) 90'	FCZ summary	45' (1:1) Nkufo; 62' (1:2) Puce; (yellow card) 69' Vardanyan	Attendance: 6,900; Referee: (Switzerland) Dieter Schoch (Attiswil)

8 May 1998 Round 12	Grasshopper Club	2–1	Zürich	Hardturm, Zürich
20:00	Christ (yellow card) 20' (yellow-red card) 88'; Haas (yellow card) 40'; Türkyilmaz 51' (1:1); Vogel (58 pen- 2:1)	FCZ summary	(yellow card) 7' Tejeda; 36' (0:1) Yekini; (yellow card) 45' Opango; (yellow card) 57' Brunner	Attendance: 13,000; Referee: (Switzerland) Dominique Tavel (Lonay)

16 May 1998 Round 13	Zürich	4–0	Luzern	Letzigrund, Zürich
19:30	Yekini 28' (1:0); Yekini 67' (2:0); Nonda 74' (3:0); Nonda 87' (4:0)	FCZ summary	(yellow card) 10' Sawu; (yellow card) 16' Knez	Attendance: 3,900; Referee: (Switzerland) Andreas Schluchter (Schönenbuch)

23 May 1998 Round 14	Sion	3–2	Zürich	Stade Tourbillon, Sion
19:30	Ouattara 23' (1:1); Camadini (yellow card) 26'; Ouattara (yellow card) 39'; Chassot 64' (2:2); Chassot (yellow card) 87'; Chassot 88' (3:2)	FCZ summary	19' (0:1) Nonda; 37' (1:2) Nonda; (yellow card) 43' Tarone; (yellow card) 67' Brugnoli; (yellow card) 77' Sant'Anna; (yellow card) 86' Huber	Attendance: 13,200; Referee: (Switzerland) Claude Detruche, (Thônex)

==== Final league table ====
Pos	Team	Pld	W	D	L	GF	GA	GD	BP	Pts	Qualification
1	Grasshopper Club	14	11	1	2	39	16	+23	23	57	Qualification to Champions League first qualifying round
2	Servette	14	5	6	3	18	15	+3	20	41	Qualification to UEFA Cup second qualifying round
3	Lausanne-Sport	14	5	4	5	17	17	0	21	40	Qualification to Cup Winners' Cup qualifying round
4	Zürich	14	6	5	3	27	17	+10	15	38	Qualification to UEFA Cup second qualifying round
5	Sion	14	6	4	4	23	21	+2	15	37	Qualification to Intertoto Cup first round
6	St. Gallen	14	4	5	5	12	17	−5	15	32	Qualification to Intertoto Cup first round
7	Aarau	14	1	4	9	13	27	−14	18	25	
8	Luzern	14	1	5	8	10	29	−19	15	23	

Source: rsssf.com
Rules for classification: 1) points; 2) Position in the qualification.

=== Swiss Cup ===
The first-tier clubs from the 1994–95 Nationalliga A were granted byes for the first four rounds, they joined the competition in this round. The first-tier teams were seeded and cound not be drawn against each other. The draw respected regionalities, when possible, and the lower classed team was granted home advantage.

16 November 1997 Round 5	FC Schaffhausen	0–1 (a.e.t.)	Zürich	Stadion Breite, Schaffhausen
	Gerstenmájer (yellow card) 15'; Stübi (yellow card) 42'; Ogg (yellow card) 50'; Pinelli (yellow card) 95'; Šlekys (red card) 113'; Galbarini (yellow card) 118'	FCZ summary	(yellow card) 31' Hodel; (yellow card) 86' Ferreri; 101' (0:1) Di Jorio; (yellow card) 116' Di Jorio	Attendance: 2,194; Referee: (Switzerland) Jürg Herrmann (Hinterkapplen (Wohlen bei Bern))

21 February 1998 Round 6	Wil	0–0 (a.e.t.) (6–5 p)	Zürich	Stadion Bergholz, Wil
	Fuchs (yellow card) 15'; Agnaldo (yellow card) 60'	FCZ summary	(yellow card) 6' Opango; (yellow card) 40' Sutter; (yellow card) 48' Fischer	Attendance: 2,200; Referee: (Switzerland) Philippe Leuba (Chexbres)
	Penalties
	Besio (penalty scored); Winkler (penalty scored); Fuchs (penalty scored); Python (penalty missed); Paradiso (penalty scored); Soller (penalty scored); Steingruber (penalty scored)		(penalty scored) Fischer; (penalty scored) Hodel; (penalty missed) Iodice; (penalty scored) Baldassari; (penalty scored) Nonda; (penalty scored) Guzik; (penalty missed) Weiler

=== Friendly matches ===
==== Pre-season ====
21 June 1997 Exhibition game	Sion	0–0	Zürich	Lens, Switzerland
		FCZ summary
Note: With test-players in both teams.

24 June 1997 Sempione-Cup; Semi-final	Basel	1–1 (9–10 p)	Zürich	Moos, Balsthal
19:30	Frick (yellow card) 27'; Frei 60' (1:0)	FCZ summary FCB summary	63' (1:1) Sutter; (yellow card) 78' Guzik; (penalty missed) 85′ Tarone	Attendance: 2,000; Referee: (Switzerland) Serge Muhmenthaler (Grenchen)
	Penalties
	Zuffi (penalty scored); Frei (penalty scored); Hartmann (penalty scored); Giallanza (penalty missed); Gaudino (penalty scored); Tschopp (penalty scored); Barberis (penalty scored); Ceccaroni (penalty scored); Schmidiger (penalty scored); Buess (penalty missed); Huber (penalty missed)		(penalty scored) Gambino; (penalty scored) Guzik; (penalty scored) Sutter; (penalty missed) Brugnoli; (penalty scored) Santa'Anna; (penalty scored) Tejeda; (penalty scored) Weiler; (penalty scored) Castillo; (penalty scored) Tarone; (penalty missed) Shorunmu; (penalty scored) Konjić
Note: The Sempione Cup was a club tournament played in the summer at Sportanlage Moos, Balsthal, during the years 1987 to 2004. Corners: 1:10

28 June 1997 Sempione-Cup; Final	Croatia Zagreb	2–1	Zürich	Moos, Balsthal
	Cvitanović 11' (1:0); Šimić (yellow card); Marić 45' (2:1); Cvitanović (yellow card) 61' (yellow-red card) 62'; Tomas (yellow card) 79'	FCZ summary	(yellow card) 5' Konjic; 41' (pen.) Gambino	Attendance: 2,500; Referee: (Switzerland) Carlo Bertolini (Vira-Gambarogno)

29 June 1997 Exhibition game	Zürich	2–1	Winterthur	Tannacher, Bäretswil
	Cardoso 7' (1:0); Francesco 77' (2:1)	FCZ summary	12' (1:1)	Attendance: 500; Referee: (Switzerland) Mahler
Note: Match as part of the opening of the Tannacher sports field. With various test-players in both teams.

==== Winter break ====
28 January 1998 Exhibition game	Basel	3–0	Zürich	Athletics stadium, Basel
	(Jean-Copain Nonda) 7' (o.g.); Knup 73' (2:0); Henry 84' (3:0)	FCZ summary FCB summary		Attendance: 500; Referee: (Switzerland) Heinz Käser
Note: Zürich without Ike Shorunmu and Shabani Nonda, but with his brother Jean-Copain Nonda as test-player.

30 January 1998 Exhibition game	Zürich	2–1	Baden	Letzigrund, Zürich
	Nonda 80' (1:0); Yekini 87' (2:0)	FCZ summary	88' (2:1) Lüthi	Attendance: 100

5 February 1997 Exhibition game	Empoli	1–2	Zürich	Florence
	Goal	FCZ summary	(0:1) Edu (0:2) Edu
Note: Edu played under the alias name "Da Silva".

2 February 1998 Exhibition game	Perugia	2–2	Zürich	Perugia
	(1:2) (2:2)	FCZ summary	16' (0:1) Edu; 42' (0:2) Nonda	Referee: (Switzerland)
Note: Edu played under the alias name "Da Silva".

14 February 1998 Exhibition game	Chiasso	0–2	Zürich	Chiasso
		FCZ summary	18' (0:1) Sant'Anna; 40' (0:2) Sutter

15 February 1998 Exhibition game	Lugano	0–2	Zürich	Cornaredo, Lugano
		FCZ summary	56' (pen.) Nonda; 71' (0:2) Nonda	Attendance: 700

== Sources ==
- dbFCZ Homepage
- Switzerland 1997–98 at RSSSF

Preceded by 1996–97	FC Zürich seasons	Succeeded by 1998–99
