= 1998–99 FC Zürich season =

FC Zürich
1998–99 season
- Owner: Sven Hotz
- Chairman: Sven Hotz
- Head-coach: Raimondo Ponte
- Stadium: Letzigrund
- 1998–99 NLA Qualification round: 3rd of 12
- 1998–99 NLA Championship group: 4th of 8
- 1998–99 Swiss Cup: Round 6
- 1998–99 UEFA Cup: Round 3

The 1998–99 season was FC Zürich's 102nd season in their existence, since their foundation in 1896. It was their ninth consecutive season in the top flight of Swiss football, following their promotion at the end of 1989–90 season.

== Overview ==
The local businessman Sven Hotz was the club's chairman and patron at this time. He had taken over as club president at the AGM in 1986. Raimondo Ponte had been the FCZ first team head-coach during the previous three and a quarter seasons and he had prolonged his contract with the club for this season. The FCZ first team competed in this years domestic first-tier 1998–99 Nationalliga A with the clear intention of retaining their top level status and reaching the championship group for the second half of the season. The team also competed in 1998–99 Swiss Cup. FCZ had as qualified for the 1998–99 UEFA Cup and here they started in the UEFA Cup qualifying round. They did not enter the 1998 Intertoto Cup. Their aim this season was to reach the top three of the league and challenge for the championship title and to win the domestic cup competition and thus qualify for one of the UEFA European tournaments.

FCZ played their home games in the Letzigrund, a stadium also used by the athletics club LC Zürich. The stadium originally opened in 1925, was partially rebuilt in 1973 and modernised during the previous two seasons. The stadium is located in the west of Zurich in the district of Altstetten, which is about three kilometers from the city center.

At the end of the league season FCZ found themselves in the unloved fourth position in the table and so they had failed to reach third place which was the qualification slot for the 1999–2000 UEFA Cup qualifying round. One week later the Swiss Cup final took place and Lausanne-Sport won the trophy by beating Grasshopper Club. Therefore, Lausanne qualified directly to the 1999–2000 UEFA Cup first round as Cup winners. As Lausanne were in third position in the final league table, the UEFA Cup qualifying round slot was passed down to the next placed team, thus FCZ profited and qualified.

== Players ==
The following is the list of the FCZ first team squad this season. It also includes players that were in the squad the day the domestic league season started, on 5 July 1997, but subsequently left the club after that date.

Note: Flags indicate national team as defined under FIFA eligibility rules; some limited exceptions apply. Players may hold more than one non-FIFA nationality.

| No. | Pos. | Nation | Player |
|---|---|---|---|
| — | GK | BUL | Borislav Mihaylov (league games: 1) |
| — | GK | SUI | Marco Pascolo (league games: 12) |
| — | GK | NIG | Ike Shorunmu (league games: 19) |
| — | GK | ITA | Christian Trombini (league games: 9) |
| — | DF | TUR | Selçuk Beyaz (league games: 2) |
| — | DF | SUI | Pascal Castillo (league games: 27) |
| — | DF | ITA | Giorgio Del Signore (league games: 22) |
| — | DF | SRB | Aleksandar Đorđević (league games: 10) |
| — | DF | SUI | Urs Fischer (league games: 31) |
| — | DF | SUI | Marc Hodel (league games: 32) |
| — | DF | SUI | Robert Huber (league games: 23) |
| — | DF | COD | David Opango (league games: 12) |
| — | DF | SUI | David Pallas (league games: 4) |
| — | MF | SUI | Samir Albrecht (league games: 9) |

| No. | Pos. | Nation | Player |
|---|---|---|---|
| — | MF | SUI | Francesco Di Jorio (league games: 32) |
| — | MF | SUI | Daniel Gygax (league games: 2) |
| — | MF | ITA | Luca Iodice (league games: 25) |
| — | MF | GEO | Gocha Jamarauli (league games: 11) |
| — | MF | BRA | Francisco Lima (league games: 30) |
| — | MF | BRA | Cesar Sant'Anna (league games: 29) |
| — | MF | SUI | Daniel Tarone (league games: 32) |
| — | MF | SUI | André Wiederkehr (league games: 20) |
| — | FW | CIV | Yacouba Bamba (league games: 2) |
| — | FW | RSA | Shaun Bartlett (league games: 27) |
| — | FW | SUI | Reto Burri (league games: 1) |
| — | FW | SUI | Frédéric Chassot (league games: 31) |
| — | FW | SUI | Adrian Kunz (league games: 10) |
| — | FW | TRI | Jerren Nixon (league games: 10) |

Players who left the squad

The following is the list of the FCZ first team players that left the squad during the previous season or in the off-season, before the new domestic season began.

Note: Flags indicate national team as defined under FIFA eligibility rules; some limited exceptions apply. Players may hold more than one non-FIFA nationality.

| No. | Pos. | Nation | Player |
|---|---|---|---|
| — | GK | SUI | Ueli Brunner (retired) |
| — | DF | SUI | Giuseppe Gambino (to FC St. Gallen) |
| — | DF | BIH | Muhamed Konjic (to AS Monaco FC) |
| — | DF | SUI | Carmelo Trande (to FC Freienbach) |
| — | DF | SUI | René Weiler (to FC Winterthur) |
| — | MF | SUI | Alijosa Aleksandrovic (to FC Red Star Zürich) |
| — | MF | ITA | Roberto Baldassarri (to FC Aarau) |
| — | MF | SUI | Renato Brugnoli (to FC Winterthur) |

| No. | Pos. | Nation | Player |
|---|---|---|---|
| — | MF | FRA | Jean-Marc Ferreri (to Saint-Denis Saint-Leu) |
| — | MF | CZE | Martin Guzik (to FC Baden) |
| — | MF | SUI | Bruno Sutter (to FC Schaffhausen) |
| — | MF | SUI | Julio Tejeda (to FC Lugano) |
| — | FW | BRA | Eduardo Dos Santos «Edu» (loan to FC Solothurn) |
| — | FW | COD | Shabani Nonda (to Stade Rennais F.C.) |
| — | FW | NIG | Rashidi Yekini (to CA Bizertin) |

== Results ==
Legend

Win Draw Loss Postponed

=== Nationalliga A ===
==== Qualification phase ====
The first stage of the NLA began on 18 July 1998 and was completed on 13 December. The top eight teams in the qualification phase would advance to the championship group and the last four teams would play against relegation.

| 18 July 1998 Round 1 | Luzern | 3–2 | Zürich | Stadion Allmend, Luzern |
| 19:30 | Scepanovic (yellow card) 10'; Koumantarakis (yellow card) 21'; Scepanovic 31' (1:1); Scepanovic 45' (2:1) van Eck (yellow card) 62'; Scepanovic 90' (pen- 3:2) | FCZ summary | 19' (0:1) Chassot; (yellow card) 23' Fischer; 50' (2:2) Chassot; (yellow card) 62' Chassot | Attendance: 6,980; Referee: (Switzerland) Dominique Tavel (Lonay) |

| 21 July 1998 Round 2 | Zürich | 0–1 | Servette | Letzigrund, Zürich |
| 19:30 | | FCZ summary | 59' (0:1) Rey | Attendance: 5,200; Referee: (Switzerland) Markus Nobs (Wohlen bei Bern) |

| 25 July 1998 Round 3 | Basel | 2–1 | Zürich | St. Jakob Stadium, Basel |
| 19:30 | Tschopp (yellow card) 3'; Rytchkov 25' (1:0); Rytchkov (yellow card) 44'; Sahin 45' (2:0); Reimann (yellow card) 64' | FCZ summary FCB summary | (yellow card) 27' Sant'Anna; (yellow card) 30' Castillo; 64' (pen. 2:1) Sant'Anna; (yellow card) 82' Di Jorio | Attendance: 8,500; Referee: (Switzerland) Dieter Schoch (Attiswil) |

| 31 July 1998 Round 4 | Zürich | 1–1 | Xamax | Letzigrund, Zürich |
| 19:30 | Del Signore (yellow card) 49'; Nixon 62' (1:1) | FCZ summary | 21' (0:1) N'Do; (yellow card) 21' Njanka | Attendance: 4,600; Referee: (Switzerland) Carlo Bertolini (Vira-Gambarogno) |

| 7 August 1998 Round 5 | St. Gallen | 0–0 | Zürich | Espenmoos, St. Gallen |
| 19:30 | Dal Santo (yellow card) 54'; Gil (yellow card) 88' | FCZ summary | (yellow card) 15' Di Jorio; (red card) 19' Lima; (yellow card) 86' Đorđević | Attendance: 9,000; Referee: (Switzerland) Urs Meier (Wettingen and Würenlos) |

| 16 August 1998 Round 6 | Zürich | 0–0 | Grasshopper Club | Letzigrund, Zürich |
| 16:15 | | FCZ summary | (yellow card) 5' Magnin; (yellow card) 28' Tikva; (yellow card) 53' Haas | Attendance: 10.444; Referee: (Switzerland) Massimo Busacca (Monte Carasso/Bellinzona) |

| 21 August 1998 Round 7 | Lausanne-Sport | 1–1 | Zürich | Olympique de la Pontaise, Lausanne |
| 19:30 | Puce (yellow card) 31'; Puce 42' (1:0); Hänzi (yellow card) 61' | FCZ summary | (yellow card) 21' (yellow-red card) 54' Albrecht; (yellow card) 45' Đorđević; 62' (1:1) Nixon; (yellow card) 90' Di Jorio | Attendance: 4,250; Referee: (Switzerland) Reto Rutz (Amriswil) |

| 29 August 1998 Round 8 | Zürich | 3–2 | Young Boys | Letzigrund, Zürich |
| 19:30 | Chassot 30' (1:0); Đorđević (yellow card) 36'; Bartlett 38' (2:0); Sant'Anna 68' (pen.); Fischer (yellow card) 75'; Sant'Anna (yellow card) 44' (yellow-red card) 90+1' | FCZ summary | (yellow card) 18' Fryand; 40' (2:1) J. Studer; 79' (3:2) Sawu; Casamento (yellow card) 78' | Attendance: 4,200; Referee: (Switzerland) Andreas Schluchter (Schönenbuch) |

| 7 September 1998 Round 9 | Lugano | 0–0 | Zürich | Cornaredo, Lugano |
| 19:30 | Gaspoz (yellow card) 90' | FCZ summary | (yellow card) 39' Tarone; (yellow card) 55' Bartlett; (yellow card) 72' Iodice | Attendance: 2,340; Referee: (Switzerland) Dominique Tavel (Lonay) |

| 11 September 1998 Round 10 | Zürich | 3–0 | Sion | Letzigrund, Zürich |
| 19:30 | Bartlett 18' (1:0); Sant'Anna 32' (pen.); Chassot 71' (3:0) | FCZ summary | (yellow card) 34' Duruz; (yellow card) 56' Bertone; (yellow card) 60' Eydelie; (yellow card) 70' Nichetti | Attendance: 3,100; Referee: (Switzerland) Philippe Leuba (Chexbres) |

| 20 September 1998 Round 11 | Aarau | 0–2 | Zürich | Stadion Brügglifeld, Aarau |
| 16:15 | Aleksandrov (yellow card) 7'; Previtali (yellow card) 45'; Esposito (yellow card) 79' | FCZ summary FCA summary | (yellow card) 17' Bartlett; (yellow card) 24' Nixon; 45' (pen.) Bartlett; (yellow card) 50' Del Signore; 56' (0:2) Sant'Anna | Attendance: 3,700; Referee: (Switzerland) Claude Detruche, (Thônex) |

| 25 September 1998 Round 12 | Zürich | 2–0 | Luzern | Letzigrund, Zürich |
| 19:30 | Lima 11' (1:0); Chassot 59' (2:0) | FCZ summary | (yellow card) 39' Koch; (yellow card) 58' Wyss; (yellow card) 70' Izzo; (yellow card) 90+1' Koumantarakis | Attendance: 3,900; Referee: (Switzerland) Dieter Schoch (Attiswil) |

| 3 October 1998 Round 13 | Servette | 3–1 | Zürich | Charmilles Stadium, Geneva |
| 19:30 | Fournier (yellow card) 25'; Varela 34' (1:0); Rey 45' (2:0); Bühlmann 45' (3:0); Eseosa (yellow card) 87'; Varela (yellow card) 90' | FCZ summary | (yellow card) 34' Sant'Anna; (yellow card) 37' Opango; 67' (3:1) Sant'Anna; (yellow card) 73' Lima | Attendance: 5,520; Referee: (Switzerland) Markus Nobs (Wohlen bei Bern) |

| 16 October 1998 Round 14 | Zürich | 1–0 | Basel | Letzigrund, Zürich |
| 19:30 | Fischer (yellow card) 26'; Sant'Anna (yellow card) 29'; Chassot 58' (1:0) | FCZ summary FCB summary | (yellow card) 10' Cravero; (yellow card) 27' Tschopp; (yellow card) 45' Frick; (yellow card) 59' Ouattara; (yellow card) 77' Calapes | Attendance: 11,300; Referee: (Liechtenstein) Roland Beck (Triesenberg) |

| 24 October 1998 Round 15 | Xamax | 1–1 | Zürich | Stade de la Maladière, Neuchâtel |
| 17:30 | N'Diaye 14' (1:0); Zambaz (yellow card) 71' | FCZ summary | (yellow card) 26' Di Jorio; (yellow card) 80' Bartlett; 82' (1:1) Castillo | Attendance: 7,200; Referee: (Switzerland) Roberto Ferrari |

| 30 October 1998 Round 16 | Zürich | 3–1 | St. Gallen | Letzigrund, Zürich |
| 19:30 | Sant'Anna (yellow card) 11'; Hodel (yellow card) 28'; Bartlett 23' (1:0); Pascolo (red card) 46'; Bartlett 45' (pen.); Lima 64' (3:0) | FCZ summary | (yellow card) 3' Salonidis; (yellow card) 32' Jörg Stiel; (red card) 45' Sene; 88' (3:1) Slavchev | Attendance: 4.300; Referee: (Switzerland) Dominique Tavel (Lonay) |

| 8 November 1998 Round 17 | Grasshopper Club | 1–2 | Zürich | Hardturm, Zürich |
| 16:15 | De Napoli (yellow card) 7'; Vogel (yellow card) 17'; Comisetti (yellow card) 25'; De Napoli 58' (1:1); Tararache (yellow card) 60'; Esposito (yellow card) 76' (yellow-red card) 81'; Türkyilmaz (yellow card) 90+2' | FCZ summary | (yellow card) 7' Hodel; 9' (0:1) Chassot; (yellow card) 23' Fischer; (yellow card) 29' Chassot; 90+2' (1:2) Opango | Attendance: 17,500; Referee: (Switzerland) Dieter Schoch (Attiswil) |

| 15 November 1998 Round 18 | Zürich | 3–3 | Lausanne-Sport | Letzigrund, Zürich |
| 17:30 | Chassot 14' (1:0); Nixon 41' (2:1); Nixon 50' (3:2); Tarone (red card) 51'; Đorđević (yellow card) 89' | FCZ summary | 35' (1:1) Pantelić; (yellow card) 45' Pantelić; 49' (2:2) Pantelić; 79' (3:3) Udovič; (yellow card) 85' Diogo | Attendance: 4,600; Referee: (Switzerland) Markus Nobs (Wohlen bei Bern) |

| 20 November 1998 Round 19 | Young Boys | 1–2 | Zürich | Wankdorf Stadium, Bern |
| 19:30 | Kehrli (yellow card) 26'; Casamento (red card) 54'; Kehrli 72' (1:0) | FCZ summary | (yellow card) 35' Del Signore; (yellow card) 38' Lima; (yellow card) 72' Di Jorio; (yellow card) 79' Hodel; 82' (1:1) Nixon; (yellow card) 84' Fischer; 85' (1:2) Nixon | Attendance: 3,350; Referee: (Switzerland) Reto Rutz (Amriswil) |

| 28 November 1998 Round 20 | Zürich | 4–1 | Lugano | Letzigrund, Zürich |
| 14:30 | Fischer 30' (1:0); Fischer (yellow card) 36'; Lima 71' (2:0); Hodel 85' (3:1); Fischer 87' (4:1) | FCZ summary | (yellow card) 27' (yellow-red card) 62' Rossi; (yellow card) 41' Andreoli; (yellow card) 69' Wegmann; 83' (2:1) Wegmann | Attendance: 3,800; Referee: (Switzerland) Philippe Leuba (Chexbres) |

| 4 Gedember 1998 Round 21 | Sion | 0–0 | Zürich | Stade Tourbillon, Sion |
| 19:30 | Quennoz (yellow card) 8'; Vanetta (yellow card) 86' | FCZ summary | (yellow card) 16' Sant'Anna; (yellow card) 43' Fischer; (yellow card) 79' Hodel; (yellow card) 88' Bartlett | Attendance: 7,300; Referee: (Switzerland) Carlo Bertolini (Vira-Gambarogno) |

| 13 December 1998 Round 22 | Zürich | 1–0 | Aarau | Letzigrund, Zürich |
| 14:30 | Huber (yellow card) 27'; Bamba 90+2' (1:0) | FCZ summary FCA summary | (yellow card) 39' Pavlicevic; (yellow card) 57' Ivanov | Attendance: 3,200; Referee: (Switzerland) Roberto Ferrari |

==== Qualification table ====
| Pos | Team | Pld | W | D | L | GF | GA | GD | Pts | Qualification |
|---|---|---|---|---|---|---|---|---|---|---|
| 1 | Servette | 22 | 12 | 8 | 2 | 38 | 24 | +14 | 44 | Advance to championship round halved points (rounded up) as bonus |
| 2 | Grasshopper Club | 22 | 11 | 5 | 6 | 37 | 25 | +12 | 38 | Advance to championship round halved points (rounded up) as bonus |
| 3 | Zürich | 22 | 10 | 8 | 4 | 33 | 21 | +12 | 38 | Advance to championship round halved points (rounded up) as bonus |
| 4 | Lausanne-Sport | 22 | 10 | 8 | 4 | 36 | 33 | +3 | 38 | Advance to championship round halved points (rounded up) as bonus |
| 5 | Xamax | 22 | 7 | 11 | 4 | 30 | 23 | +7 | 32 | Advance to championship round halved points (rounded up) as bonus |
| 6 | Basel | 22 | 8 | 4 | 10 | 21 | 34 | −13 | 28 | Advance to championship round halved points (rounded up) as bonus |
| 7 | Luzern | 22 | 6 | 9 | 7 | 26 | 25 | +1 | 27 | Advance to championship round halved points (rounded up) as bonus |
| 8 | St. Gallen | 22 | 7 | 6 | 9 | 31 | 31 | 0 | 27 | Advance to championship round halved points (rounded up) as bonus |
| 9 | Sion | 22 | 5 | 8 | 9 | 22 | 36 | −14 | 23 | Continue to promotion/relegation round |
| 10 | Lugano | 22 | 5 | 7 | 10 | 35 | 43 | −8 | 22 | Continue to promotion/relegation round |
| 11 | Young Boys | 22 | 4 | 7 | 11 | 33 | 34 | −1 | 19 | Continue to promotion/relegation round |
| 12 | Aarau | 22 | 3 | 7 | 12 | 28 | 41 | −13 | 16 | Continue to promotion/relegation round |

Source: rsssf.com
Rules for classification: 1) points; 2) goal difference; 3) number of goals scored.

==== Championship round ====
The first eight teams of the qualification phase competed in the Championship round. The teams took half of the points (rounded up to complete units) gained in the qualification as bonus with them.

| 28 February 1999 Round 1 | Zürich | 0–2 | St. Gallen | Letzigrund, Zürich |
| 14:30 | Huber (yellow card) 52'; Lima (yellow card) 78' | FCZ summary | (yellow card) 26' Tsawa; 31' (0:1) Contini; 58' (0:2) Jairo; (yellow card) 65' Hellinga | Attendance: 5,400; Referee: (Switzerland) Dominique Tavel (Lonay) |
Note: In advance of the match, a bull named Maradona was presented as new mascot. However, the bull escaped and could only be recaptured after some time and with much difficulty.

| 6 March 1999 Round 2 | Lausanne-Sport | 3–1 | Zürich | Olympique de la Pontaise, Lausanne |
| 19:30 | Ohrel (yellow card) 6' (yellow-red card) 78'; Thurre 48' (1:0); Mazzoni 86' (2:0); Mazzoni 90+2' (3:1); Mazzoni (yellow card) 90+2'; Piffaretti (yellow card) 90+3' | FCZ summary | (yellow card) 28' Fischer; (red card) 45' Fischer; (red card) 45' Ponte (head-coach); 87' (2:1) Sant'Anna | Attendance: 4,590; Referee: (Switzerland) Dieter Schoch (Attiswil) |
Note: 45th minute, referee Schoch sends FCZ coach Raimondo Ponte to the stands.

| 13 March 1999 Round 3 | Zürich | 0–1 | Grasshopper Club | Letzigrund, Zürich |
| 17:30 | Castillo (yellow card) 12'; Đorđević (yellow card) 19' | FCZ summary | (yellow card) 33' Tararache; 58' (0:1) Comisetti; (yellow card) 64' Vogel | Attendance: 10,450; Referee: (Switzerland) Urs Meier (Wettingen and Würenlos) |

| 21 March 1999 Round 4 | Basel | 1–0 | Zürich | Stadion Schützenmatte, Basel |
| 14:30 | Cravero (yellow card) 8'; Varela (yellow card) 29'; Pérez 51' (pen. 1:0); Calapes (yellow card) 52'; Cantaluppi (yellow card) 62' | FCZ summary FCB summary | (yellow card) 24' (yellow-red card) 45' Di Jorio; (yellow card) 58' Wiederkehr | Attendance: 7,500; Referee: (Switzerland) Carlo Bertolini (Vira-Gambarogno) |

| 3 April 1999 Round 5 | Servette | 1–1 | Zürich | Charmilles Stadium, Geneva |
| 17:30 | Vurens (yellow card) 11'; Durix (yellow card) 56'; Rey 60' (1:1); Karlen (yellow card) 87' | FCZ summary | (yellow card) 21' Huber; (yellow card) 30' Iodice; 40' (0:1) Kunz; (yellow card) 61' Castillo | Attendance: 5,103; Referee: (Switzerland) Andreas Schluchter (Schönenbuch) |

| 10 April 1999 Round 6 | Zürich | 2–2 | Xamax | Letzigrund, Zürich |
| 19:30 | Hodel 9' (1:0); Kunz 18' (2:0) | FCZ summary | (penalty missed) 11′ Molist; (yellow card) 33' Molist; (yellow card) 45' N'Diaye; 64' (2:1) Isabella; (yellow card) 83' Gigon; 85' (2:2) N'Diaye | Attendance: 3,900; Referee: (Switzerland) Nicolas Daina |
Note: 11th minute Ike Shorunmu saved Molist's penalty

| 17 April 1999 Round 7 | Zürich | 3–0 | Luzern | Letzigrund, Zürich |
| 19:30 | Jamarauli 6' (1:0); Lima 10' (2:0); Bartlett 28' (3:0); Hodel (yellow card) 51' | FCZ summary | (yellow card) 47' Schnarwiler; (yellow card) 90' Vukic | Attendance: 2,700; Referee: (Switzerland) Philippe Leuba (Chexbres) |

| 24 April 1999 Round 8 | Luzern | 1–3 | Zürich | Stadion Allmend, Luzern |
| 19:30 | Koumantarakis 86' (1:3) | FCZ summary | 32' (0:1) Bartlett; 42' (0:2) Kunz; 62' (0:3) Lima | Attendance: 4,950; Referee: (Switzerland) Markus Nobs (Wohlen bei Bern) |

| 1 May 1999 Round 9 | Xamax | 1–3 | Zürich | Stade de la Maladière, Neuchâtel |
| 19:30 | Savić (yellow card) 40'; Njanka (yellow card) 60'; Bieli 79' (1:3) | FCZ summary | 12' (0:1) Bartlett; 54' (0:2) Bartlett; 60' (pen.) Bartlett; (yellow card) 89' Chassot | Attendance: 6,800; Referee: (Switzerland) Reto Rutz (Amriswil) |
Note: 40 minute, David Opango taken to hospital with broken legs after a nasty foul by Nenad Savić.

| 9 May 1999 Round 10 | Zürich | 4–0 | Servette | Letzigrund, Zürich |
| 16:00 | Nixon 10' (1:0); Lima (yellow card) 13'; Hodel 52' (2:0); Lima 57' (3:0); Chassot 69' (4:0) | FCZ summary | (yellow card) 45' Wolf; (yellow card) 48' Vurens; (yellow card) 49' Rey | Attendance: 5,300; Referee: (Switzerland) Dieter Schoch (Attiswil) |

| 16 May 1999 Round 11 | Zürich | 2–1 | Basel | Letzigrund, Zürich |
| 16:15 | Sant'Anna (yellow card) 45'; Castillo 78' (1:1); Bartlett 83' (2:1); Jamarauli (yellow card) 90+3' | FCZ summary FCB summary | (yellow card) 13' (yellow-red card) 61' Cantaluppi; (yellow card) 29' Rytchkov; 34' (0:1) Frick; (yellow card) 45' Potocianu; (yellow card) 80' Sahin | Attendance: 12,300; Referee: (Switzerland) Massimo Busacca (Monte Carasso/Bellinzona) |
Note: 47th minute, Bartlett's goal was disallowed because of an offside.

| 24 May 1999 Round 12 | Grasshopper Club | 0–2 | Zürich | Hardturm, Zürich |
| 16:15 | Berner (yellow card) 49'; Kavelashvili (yellow card) 49' de Napoli (yellow card) 77' | FCZ summary | (yellow card) 19' Di Jorio; 23' (0:1) Bartlett; (yellow card) 38' Chassot; 70' (0:2) Bartlett | Attendance: 17,000; Referee: (Switzerland) Marcel Vollenweider (Rüti, Zürich) |

| 30 May 1999 Round 13 | Zürich | 0–1 | Lausanne-Sport | Letzigrund, Zürich |
| 16:15 | Sant'Anna (yellow card) 43' | FCZ summary | (yellow card) 5' Celestini; (yellow card) 22' Gerber; (yellow card) 50' Ohrel; 84' (0:1) Rehn | Attendance: 13,200; Referee: (Switzerland) Andreas Schluchter (Schönenbuch) |

| 2 June 1999 Round 14 | St. Gallen | 1–3 | Zürich | Espenmoos, St. Gallen |
| 20:15 | Gil 64' (1:3) | FCZ summary | 17' (0:1) Castillo; 18' (0:2) Nixon; (red card) 22' Ponte (head-coach); (yellow card) 27' Di Jorio; 54' (0:3) Nixon | Attendance: 3,700; Referee: (Switzerland) Dominique Tavel (Lonay) |
Note: 22nd minute FCZ coach Raimondo Ponte sent to the stands.

==== Final league table ====
| Pos | Team | Pld | W | D | L | GF | GA | GD | BP | Pts | Qualification |
|---|---|---|---|---|---|---|---|---|---|---|---|
| 1 | Servette | 14 | 7 | 3 | 4 | 19 | 14 | +5 | 22 | 46 | Swiss champions, qualified for Champions League third qualifying round |
| 2 | Grasshopper Club | 14 | 8 | 3 | 3 | 31 | 11 | +20 | 19 | 46 | qualified for UEFA Cup qualifying round |
| 3 | Lausanne-Sport | 14 | 8 | 2 | 4 | 28 | 20 | +8 | 19 | 45 | Swiss Cup winners, qualified for UEFA Cup first round |
| 4 | Zürich | 14 | 7 | 2 | 5 | 24 | 15 | +9 | 19 | 42 | qualified for UEFA Cup qualifying round |
| 5 | Basel | 14 | 5 | 4 | 5 | 18 | 19 | −1 | 14 | 33 | qualified for Intertoto Cup first round |
| 6 | Xamax | 14 | 2 | 6 | 6 | 12 | 27 | −15 | 16 | 28 | qualified for Intertoto Cup first round |
| 7 | Luzern | 14 | 4 | 2 | 8 | 13 | 27 | −14 | 14 | 28 | |
| 8 | St. Gallen | 14 | 2 | 4 | 8 | 13 | 25 | −12 | 14 | 24 | |

Source: rsssf.com
Rules for classification: 1) points; 2) Position in the qualification.

=== Swiss Cup ===
The 12 first-tier clubs from the 1998–99 Nationalliga A had been granted byes for the first four rounds and they joined the competition in the fifth round. The first-tier teams were seeded and cound not be drawn against each other. The draw respected regionalities, when possible, and the lower classed team was granted home advantage.

| 20 February 1999 Round 5 | Locarno | 0–0 (a.e.t.) (3–5 p) | Zürich | Stadio del Lido, Locarno |
| | De Lusi (yellow card) 21'; Pido (yellow card) 56' | FCZ summary | (yellow card) 26' Tarone; (yellow card) 55' Del Signore; (yellow card) 104' Iodice; (yellow card) 109' Sant'Anna; (yellow card) 116' Bartlett | Attendance: 1,200; Referee: (Liechtenstein) Roland Beck (Triesenberg) |
| | Penalties |
| | Schreier (penalty missed); Brcic (penalty scored); Woxlin (penalty scored); Gentizon (penalty scored) | | (penalty scored) Fischer; (penalty scored) Del Signore; (penalty scored) Tarone; (penalty scored) Iodice; (penalty scored) Bartlett |

| 14 April 1999 Round 6 | Zürich | 0–1 | Lugano | Letzigrund, Zürich |
| | Jamarauli (yellow card) 15' | FCZ summary | (yellow card) 40' Lombardo; 49' (0:1) Nkufo | Attendance: 1,600; Referee: (Switzerland) Dominique Tavel (Lonay) |

=== UEFA Cup ===
==== Second qualifying round ====
| 11 August 1998 First leg | Zürich (Switzerland) | 4–0 | (Ukraine) Shakhtar Donetsk | Letzigrund, Zürich |
| 21:30 | Sant'Anna 1'; Di Jorio (yellow card) 30'; Đorđević 61'; Chassot 71'; Tarone 88' | FCZ summary Report | (yellow card) 28' Kovalenko; (yellow card) 67' Yaksmanytskyi; (red card) 69' Kovalyov | Attendance: 8,000; Referee: Fernand Meese (Belgium) |

| 25 August 1998 Second leg | Shakhtar Donetsk (Ukraine) | 3–2 | (Switzerland) Zürich | Shakhtar Stadium, Donetsk |
| 19:00 | Orbu 24'; Orbu 69'; Kovalenko (yellow card) 70'; Štolcers 90' | FCZ summary Report | 16' Bartlett; 26' Bartlett; (yellow card) 82' Del Signore | Attendance: 13,000; Referee: Dani Koren (Israel) |

Zürich won 6–3 on aggregate.

==== First round ====
| 15 September 1998 First leg | Zürich (Switzerland) | 4–0 | (Cyprus) Anorthosis Famagusta | Letzigrund, Zürich |
| 20:00 (CET) | Nixon 35'; Di Jorio (yellow card) 42'; Hodel 58'; Del Signore (yellow card) 67'; Bartlett 69'; Chassot 81' | FCZ summary Report | (yellow card) 77' Okkas | Attendance: 4,100; Referee: Sergey Shmolik (Belarus) |

| 29 September 1998 Second leg | Anorthosis Famagusta (Cyprus) | 2–3 | (Switzerland) Zürich | Antonis Papadopoulos Stadium, Larnaca |
| 19:00 (CET) | Krčmarević (yellow card) 5'; Pounnas (yellow card) 29'; Ioannou (yellow card) 30' (yellow-red card) 77'; Tomić (red card) 33' (Fischer) 45' (o.g.); Louka (yellow card) 50'; Krčmarević 73'; Engomitis (yellow card) 80' | FCZ summary Report | 12' Sant'Anna; (yellow card) 23' Hodel; 38' Bartlett; (yellow card) 43' Tarone; (yellow card) 51' Wiederkehr; (yellow card) 59' Sant'Anna; 62' Bartlett | Attendance: 4,000; Referee: Kenny Clark (Scotland) |

Zürich won 7–2 on aggregate.

==== Second round ====
| 20 October 1998 First leg | Celtic (Scotland) | 1–1 | (Switzerland) Zürich | Celtic Park, Glasgow |
| 21:00 (CET) | Brattbakk 23'; (red card) 45' Boyd; (yellow card) 73' Burley | FCZ summary Report | (yellow card) 68' Del Signore; 78' Fischer; (yellow card) 87' Fischer | Attendance: 41,120; Referee: Vasyl Melnychuk (Ukraine) |

| 3 November 1998 Second leg | Zürich (Switzerland) | 4–2 | (Scotland) Celtic | Letzigrund, Zürich |
| 20:15 (CET) | Del Signore 51'; Chassot 55'; Bartlett 61'; Sant'Anna 75'; Fischer (yellow card) 87' | FCZ summary Report | (yellow card) 9' Donnelly; 53' O'Donnell; 72' Larsson | Attendance: 15,500; Referee: Leif Sundell (Sweden) |

Zürich won 5–3 on aggregate.

==== Third round ====
| 24 November 1998 First leg | Roma (Italy) | 1–0 | (Switzerland) Zürich | Stadio Olimpico, Rome |
| 16:00 (CET) | Zago (yellow card) 45'; Tomić (yellow card) 73'; Totti (yellow card) 76'; Totti 90' (pen.); Dal Moro (yellow card) 90+6' | FCZ summary Report | (yellow card) 19' Chassot; (yellow card) 27' Castillo; (yellow card) 84' Del Signore; (yellow card) 90+3' Lima | Attendance: 19,375; Referee: William Young (Scotland) |

| 8 December 1998 Second leg | Zürich (Switzerland) | 2–2 | (Italy) Roma | Letzigrund, Zürich |
| 20:45 (CET) | Chassot (yellow card) 37'; Bartlett (penalty missed) 54′ Bartlett 60'; Huber (yellow card) 64'; Bartlett 79'; Sant'Anna (yellow card) | FCZ summary Report | 14' Delvecchio; (yellow card) 59' Paulo Sérgio; (yellow card) 66' Petruzzi; 90' Totti | Attendance: 15,200; Referee: Manuel Díaz Vega (Spain) |
Note: 54th minute: Bartlett's penalty was saved by goalkeeper Antonio Chimenti.

Roma won 3–2 on aggregate.

=== Friendly matches ===
==== Pre-season ====
| 12 June 1998 Round | FC Rafz | 0–4 | Zürich | Rafz |
| | | FCZ summary | Goal |
Note: FC Rafz played the 1998–99 season in the 3. Liga (sixth-tier). FCZ played with seven test-players.

| 16 June 1998 Exhibition game | Zürcher Unterland Selection | 1–5 | Zürich |
| | 90' (1:5) | FCZ summary | (0:1) De Napoli (0:2) De Napoli (0:3) Nixon (0:4) Tarone (0:5) Chassot |
Note: FCZ with Patrick De Napoli as test-player, but the transfer failed ultimately.

| 26 June 1998 Exhibition game | FC Oberrieden | 0–8 | Zürich | Oberrieden |
| | | FCZ summary | (0:1) Bamba (0:2) Bamba (0:3) Nixon (0:4) Nixon (0:5) Sant'Anna (0:6) Sant'Anna (0:7) Sant'Anna (0:8) Hodel |
Note: FC Oberrieden played the 1998–99 season in the 4. Liga (seventh-tier).

| 28 June 1998 Exhibition game | Wil | 5–3 | Zürich | Ifang, Bazenheid |
| | Jairo 2' (1:0); Šlekys 23' (2:1); Flavio 43' (3:1); Amoah 49' (4:1); Amoah 78' (5:2) | FCZ summary | 14' (1:1) Chassot; 76' (4:2) Beyaz; 86' (5:3) Fischer |

| 1 July 1998 Exhibition game | Zürich | 2–2 | Litex Lovech | Zurzach |
| | Chassot; Chassot | FCZ summary | Goal |

| 4 July 1998 Exhibition game | FC Dietikon | 0–8 | Zürich | Fussballplatz Dornau, Dietikon |
| | | FCZ summary | Goal |
Note: Charity tournament with Aarau and St. Gallen in aid of the Cancer League on the occasion of the 90th anniversary of FC Dietikon.

| 5 July 1998 Exhibition game | Zürich | 0–4 | Aarau | Fussballplatz Dornau, Dietikon |
| | | FCZ summary | 15' (0:1) Esposito; 30' (0:2) Esposito; 55' (0:3) Esposito; 70' (0:4) Esposito | Attendance: 500; Referee: (Switzerland) Markus Nobs (Wohlen bei Bern) |
Note: Charity tournament with Aarau and St. Gallen in aid of the Cancer League on the occasion of the 90th anniversary of FC Dietikon.

| 9 July 1998 Sempione-Cup; Semi-final | Luzern | 1–0 | Zürich | Moos, Balsthal |
| | Scepanovic 61' (1:0) | FCZ summary | | Attendance: 800; Referee: (Switzerland) Jürg Herrmann (Hinterkapplen (Wohlen bei Bern)) |
Note: The Sempione Cup was a club tournament played during the summer at Sportanlage Moos, Balsthal, during the years 1987 to 2004.

| 11 July 1998 Sempione-Cup; Match for third place | Aarau | 1–1 (4–3 p) | Zürich | Moos, Balsthal |
| | Esposito 65' (1:1) | FCZ summary | 16' (0:1) Todt |
| | Penalties |
| | Penalty scored | | Penalty scored Penalty missed |
Note: The game was abandoned in the 70th minute after injuries to both goalkeepeepers, test-player Massimiliano Caniato in the first half and his substitute Ueli Brunner in the second half. The game then went into a penalty shoot-out.

==== Winter break ====
| 27 January 1999 Exhibition game | Zürich | 1–1 | Heerenveen | Chiclana de la Frontera |
| | Sant'Anna 50' (1:0) | FCZ summary | (1:1) |
Note: Test match as part of a training camp.

| 3 February 1999 Exhibition game | Zürich | 1–2 | AaB Fodbold | Chiclana de la Frontera |
| | Bartlett 35' (1:0) | FCZ summary | (1:1) (1:2) |
Note: Second test match during the training camp.

| 7 February 1999 Exhibition game | VfB Stuttgart | 1–2 | Zürich | Hohentwielstadion, Singen |
| | Marković 16' (1:0) | FCZ summary | 30' (1:1) Del Signore; 47' (1:2) Bartlett |

| 25 March 1999 Mid-season | Baden | 0–0 | Zürich | Esp Stadium, Fislisbach |
| | | FCZ summary |

== Sources ==
- dbFCZ Homepage
- Switzerland 1997–98 at RSSSF

| Preceded by 1997–98 | FC Zürich seasons | Succeeded by 1999–2000 |
