= 1996–97 FC Zürich season =

FC Zürich
1996–97 season
- Owner: Sven Hotz
- Chairman: Sven Hotz
- Head-coach: Raimondo Ponte
- Stadium: Letzigrund
- 1996–97 NLA Qualification round: 7th of 12
- 1996–97 NLA Championship group: 7th of 8
- 1996–97 Swiss Cup: Round 4
- Top goalscorer: League: Shabani Nonda (8); All: Shabani Nonda (8)

The 1996–97 season was FC Zürich's 10th season in their existence, since their foundation in 1896. It was their seventh consecutive season in the top flight of Swiss football, following their promotion at the end of 1989–90 season.

== Overview ==
The local businessman Sven Hotz was the club's chairman and patron at this time. He had taken over as club president at the AGM in 1986. Raimondo Ponte had been the FCZ first team head-coach during the previous season and during April had had prolonged his contract with the club for this season. The FCZ first team competed in this years domestic first-tier 1996–97 Nationalliga A with the clear intention of retaining their top level status and reaching the championship group for the second half of the season. The team also competed in 1996–97 Swiss Cup. They had not qualified for any of the UEFA European tournaments and they did not enter the 1996 Intertoto Cup.

FCZ played their home games in the Letzigrund. The stadium is located in the west of Zurich in the district of Altstetten, which is about three kilometers from the city center.

== Players ==
The following is the list of the FCZ first team squad this season. It also includes players that were in the squad the day the domestic league season started, on 10 July 1996, but subsequently left the club after that date.

Note: Flags indicate national team as defined under FIFA eligibility rules; some limited exceptions apply. Players may hold more than one non-FIFA nationality.

No.	Pos.	Nation	Player
—	GK	SUI	Ueli Brunner (league games: 4)
—	GK	SUI	Patrick Mäder (league games: 1)
—	GK	NIG	Ike Shorunmu (league games: 36)
—	DF	SUI	Pascal Castillo (league games: 31)
—	DF	SUI	Urs Fischer (league games: 34)
—	DF	SUI	Giuseppe Gambino (league games: 23)
—	DF	SUI	Robert Huber (league games: 27)
—	DF	BIH	Muhamed Konjic (league games: 29)
—	DF	SUI	Giuseppe Mazzarelli (league games: 29)
—	DF	SUI	Kazik Nicolò (league games: 1)
—	DF	SUI	David Pallas (league games: 2)
—	DF	SUI	Carmelo Trande (league games: 3)
—	DF	SUI	René Weiler (league games: 25)

No.	Pos.	Nation	Player
—	MF	SUI	Alijosa Aleksandrovic (league games: 1)
—	MF	ITA	Roberto Baldassarri (league games: 18)
—	MF	SUI	Francesco Di Jorio (league games: 32)
—	MF	ITA	Giuseppe Nocita (league games: 2)
—	MF	SUI	Jürg Studer (league games: 28)
—	MF	POL	Dariusz Szubert (league games: 5)
—	MF	SUI	Daniel Tarone (league games: 29)
—	MF	SUI	Julio Tejeda (league games: 33)
—	FW	NOR	Jørn Andersen (league games: 24)
—	FW	SWE	Tomas Brolin (league games: 3)
—	FW	TRI	Jerren Nixon (league games: 33)
—	FW	COD	Shabani Nonda (league games: 32)
—	FW	BIH	Marko Topić (league games: 5)
—	FW	ENG	Roger Walker (league games: 9)

Players who left the squad

The following is the list of the FCZ first team players that left the squad during the previous season or in the off-season, before the new domestic season began.

Note: Flags indicate national team as defined under FIFA eligibility rules; some limited exceptions apply. Players may hold more than one non-FIFA nationality.

No.	Pos.	Nation	Player
—	GK	SUI	Jörg Stiel (to St. Gallen)
—	DF	SUI	Mark Disler (to Baden)
—	DF	SUI	Marc Hodel (to Aarau)
—	DF	SUI	Aniello Tomeo (reserves)
—	DF	SUI	Roland Widmer (retired)
—	MF	SUI	Philipp Lehner (reserves)

No.	Pos.	Nation	Player
—	MF	RSA	August Makalakalane (to Baden)
—	MF	SUI	Andreas Schmid (to FC Red Star Zürich)
—	MF	SUI	Rony Ziegler (to Étoile Carouge)
—	FW	SUI	Urs Güntensperger (to Eintracht Frankfurt)
—	FW	NED	John Hoeks (to K.F.C. Lommel S.K.)
—	FW	SUI	Sinisa Metlar (reserves)

== Results ==
Legend

Win Draw Loss Postponed

=== Nationalliga A ===
This was the second season that three points were awarded to the winning team.

==== Qualification phase ====
The first stage of the NLA began on 10 July 1996 and was completed on 1 December. The top eight teams in the qualification phase would advance to the championship group and the last four teams would play against relegation.

10 July 1996 Round 1	Zürich	1–1	Luzern	Letzigrund, Zürich
20:00	J. Studer (yellow card) 56'; 70' (1:1) Castillo; Andersen (yellow card) 73'	FCZ summary	2' (0:1) Sermeter	Attendance: 6,200; Referee: (Switzerland) Hans Müller (Bern)

14 July 1996 Round 5	Grasshopper Club	0–1	Zürich	Hardturm, Zürich
19:00	Gämperle (yellow card) 46'; M. Yakin (yellow card) 52'; Türkyilmaz (penalty missed) 60′ Comisetti (yellow card) 90'	FCZ summary	(yellow card) 6' Weiler; (yellow card) 63' Tejeda; (yellow card) 79' Topić; 83' (0:1) J. Studer; (yellow card) J. Studer	Attendance: 12,000; Referee: (Switzerland) Marcel Vollenweider (Rüti, Zürich)
Note: Match brought forward from 31 July. 60th minute Shorunmu saved Türkyilmaz's penalty.

17 July 1996 Round 2	Zürich	1–1	Aarau	Letzigrund, Zürich
20:00	Di Jorio (red card) 25'; Nonda 45' (pen.)	FCZ summary FCA summary	(yellow card) 8' Bader; (yellow card) 13' B. Studer; (yellow card) 27' Skrzypczak; 60' (pen.) Wiederkehr	Attendance: 7,600; Referee: (Switzerland) Adrian Stalder (Oberburg, Bern)

20 July 1996 Round 3	Servette	0–0	Zürich	Charmilles Stadium, Geneva
20:00	Biaggi (yellow card) 34'; Sogbie (yellow card) 55'	FCZ summary	(yellow card) 66' Nonda	Attendance: 3,800; Referee: (Switzerland) Kurt Zuppinger (Bremgarten, Aargau)

24 July 1996 Round 4	Zürich	0–0	St. Gallen	Letzigrund, Zürich
20:00	Fischer (yellow card) 4'; Weiler (yellow card) 60'	FCZ summary	(yellow card) 34' Motaung; (yellow card) 44' Konjić; (yellow card) 51' Dal Santo	Attendance: 8,400; Referee: (Switzerland) Claude Detruche, (Thônex)

3 August 1996 Round 6	Zürich	2–1	Sion	Letzigrund, Zürich
20:00	Nonda 2' (1:0); Tejeda (yellow card) 38'; J. Studer (yellow card) 59'; Nonda 79' (pen. 2:1)	FCZ summary	(yellow card) 10' Bühlmann; 74' (1:1) Mirandinha; (yellow card) 78' Kombouaré	Attendance: 5,200; Referee: (Switzerland) Philippe Leuba (Chexbres)

11 August 1996 Round 7	Lugano	2–2	Zürich	Cornaredo, Lugano
20:00	Simo (yellow card) 34'; Karić (yellow card) 40'; Karić 62' (1:2); Kallon 81' (2:2)	FCZ summary	(yellow card) 34' Konjic; (red card) 36' Castillo; 42' (0:1) Di Jorio; 58' (0:2) Weiler; (yellow card) 83' Nixon	Attendance: 4,200; Referee: (Switzerland) Claude Detruche, (Thônex)

17 August 1996 Round 8	Zürich	0–1	Xamax	Letzigrund, Zürich
20:00	Tarone (yellow card) 55'; Di Jorio (yellow card) 61'; Nonda (yellow card) 85'	FCZ summary	(yellow card) 55' Jeanneret; 58' (0:1) Rueda	Attendance: 5,800; Referee: (Switzerland) Markus Nobs (Wohlen bei Bern)

25 August 1996 Round 9	Lausanne-Sport	3–2	Zürich	Olympique de la Pontaise, Lausanne
20:00	Savovic 65' (1:2); Sané 78' (2:2); Savovic 80' (3:2)	FCZ summary	(yellow card) 26' Andersen; (yellow card) 29' Konjic; 37' (0:1) Nixon; 51' (0:2) Nixon	Attendance: 4,600; Referee: (Switzerland) Hans Müller (Bern)

4 September 1996 Round 10	Young Boys	1–2	Zürich	Wankdorf Stadium, Bern
20:00	Baumann (yellow card) 52'; Bekirovski (yellow card) 64'; Gianinazzi (yellow card) 65'; Baumann 82' (1:2)	FCZ summary	8' (0:1) Nonda; (yellow card) 52' (yellow-red card) 62' Di Jorio; (yellow card) 71' Nixon; 79' Nixon; (yellow card) 90+1' Gambino	Attendance: 3,600; Referee: (Switzerland) Vincent Dafflon

7 September 1996 Round 11	Zürich	1–1	Basel	Letzigrund, Zürich
20:00	Mazzarelli 77' (1:1)	FCZ summary FCB summary	(yellow card) 36' Ceccaroni; 38' (0:1) Giallanza; (yellow card) 73' Grüter; (yellow card) 75' Salvi	Attendance: 10,500; Referee: (Switzerland) Urs Meier (Wettingen and Würenlos)

14 September 1996 Round 12	Luzern	3–0	Zürich	Stadion Allmend, Luzern
20:00	Sawu 4' (1:0); Wolf (penalty missed) 11′ Fink (yellow card) 53'; Sawu 55' (2:0); Wolf (yellow card) 77'; Müller 89' (3:0)	FCZ summary		Attendance: 9,060; Referee: (Switzerland) Serge Muhmenthaler (Grenchen)
Note: 11th minute Shorunmu saves Wolf's penalty.

18 September 1996 Round 13	Aarau	2–1	Zürich	Stadion Brügglifeld, Aarau
20:00	Roembiak 32' (pen.); Ćirić 48' (2:0); Hodel (yellow card) 79'; Roembiak (yellow card) 90+1'	FCZ summary' FCA summary	(yellow card) 37' Nonda; 82' (2:1) Andersen	Attendance: 3,100; Referee: (Switzerland) Markus Nobs (Wohlen bei Bern)

28 September 1996 Round 14	Zürich	3–1	Servette	Letzigrund, Zürich
20:00	Mazzarelli (yellow card) 32'; Konjic 34' (1:0); Konjic 63' (2:1); Fischer (yellow card) 78'; Castillo 86' (3:1)	FCZ summary	(yellow card) 28' Cantaluppi; (yellow card) 44' Biaggi; 56' (1:1) Ippoliti; (red card) 77' Sesa; (red card) 83' Nava	Attendance: 3,600; Referee: (Switzerland) Dieter Schoch (Attiswil)

9 October 1996 Round 15	St. Gallen	1–0	Zürich	Espenmoos, St. Gallen
20:00	Regtop 61' (1:0)	FCZ summary		Attendance: 6,500; Referee: (Switzerland) Hans Müller (Bern)

13 October 1996 Round 16	Zürich	2–4	Grasshopper Club	Letzigrund, Zürich
17:30	Weiler 40' (1:1); Shorunmu (yellow card) 63'; Nonda 73' (pen. 2:2)	FCZ summary	3' (pen. 1:0) Gren; (yellow card) 11' Gren; (yellow card) 29' Türkyilmaz; (yellow card) 48' Lombardo; 64' (1:2) Moldovan; (yellow card) 72' Thüler; (yellow card) 74' Haas; 85' (2:3) Smiljanic; 90+2' (2:4) Moldovan	Attendance: 9,600; Referee: (Switzerland) Carlo Bertolini (Vira-Gambarogno)

20 October 1996 Round 17	Sion	0–1	Zürich	Stade Tourbillon, Sion
14:30		FCZ summary	(yellow card) 31' J. Studer; (yellow card) 33' Konjic; 77' (0:1) Nonda; (yellow card) 79' Mazzarelli	Attendance: 9,000; Referee: (Switzerland) Urs Meier (Wettingen and Würenlos)

26 October 1996 Round 18	Zürich	1–1	Lugano	Letzigrund, Zürich
14:30	Castillo 54' (1:0); Weiler (yellow card) 73'	FCZ summary	(yellow card) 9' (yellow-red card) 74' Rezzonico; (yellow card) 41' Ramondetta; (yellow card) 47' Morf; 63' (1:1) Giannini	Attendance: 4,800; Referee: (Switzerland) Andreas Schluchter (Schönenbuch)

3 November 1996 Round 19	Xamax	1–1	Zürich	Stade de la Maladière, Neuchâtel
14:30	Bonalair 16' (1:0)	FCZ summary	(yellow card) 54' Tarone; 71' (1:1) Fischer	Attendance: 6,500; Referee: (Switzerland) Serge Muhmenthaler (Grenchen)

17 November 1996 Round 20	Zürich	3–0	Lausanne-Sport	Letzigrund, Zürich
14:30	Weiler 30' (1:0); Fischer (yellow card) 29'; Weiler 63' (2:0); J. Studer (yellow card) 72'; Nixon 77' (3:0)	FCZ summary	(yellow card) 45' Ohrel; (yellow card) 57' Gualco; (yellow card) 61' Douglas; (yellow card) 65' Londono	Attendance: 5,800; Referee: (Switzerland) Claude Detruche, (Thônex)

24 November 1996 Round 21	Zürich	0–1	Young Boys	Letzigrund, Zürich
14:30	Konjic (yellow card) 78'; J. Studer (yellow card) 90'	FCZ summary	47' (0:1) Streun; (yellow card) 52' Eich	Attendance: 4,000; Referee: (Switzerland) Serge Muhmenthaler (Grenchen)

1 December 1996 Round 22	Basel	0–0	Zürich	St. Jakob Stadium, Basel
14:30	Disseris (yellow card) 9'; Falub (yellow card) 84'	FCZ summary FCB summary	(yellow card) 22' Gambino; (yellow card) 42' Di Jorio; (yellow card) 45' Tarone	Attendance: 21,000; Referee: (Switzerland) Urs Meier (Wettingen and Würenlos)

==== Qualification table ====
Pos	Team	Pld	W	D	L	GF	GA	GD	Pts	Qualification
1	Xamax	22	12	8	2	36	20	+16	44	Advance to championship round halved points (rounded up) as bonus
2	Grasshopper Club	22	10	9	3	42	27	+15	39	Advance to championship round halved points (rounded up) as bonus
3	Sion	22	9	10	3	33	21	+12	37	Advance to championship round halved points (rounded up) as bonus
4	Aarau	22	9	8	5	21	14	+7	35	Advance to championship round halved points (rounded up) as bonus
5	Lausanne-Sports	22	9	7	6	35	32	+3	34	Advance to championship round halved points (rounded up) as bonus
6	St. Gallen	22	6	10	6	20	26	−6	28	Advance to championship round halved points (rounded up) as bonus
7	Zürich	22	6	9	7	24	25	−1	27	Advance to championship round halved points (rounded up) as bonus
8	Basel	22	5	11	6	32	32	0	26	Advance to championship round halved points (rounded up) as bonus
9	Servette	22	5	9	8	24	25	−1	24	Continue to promotion/relegation round
10	Luzern	22	4	11	7	27	32	−5	23	Continue to promotion/relegation round
11	Lugano	22	2	9	11	14	32	−18	15	Continue to promotion/relegation round
12	Young Boys	22	3	3	16	17	39	−22	12	Continue to promotion/relegation round

Source: rsssf.com
Rules for classification: 1) Points; 2) Goal difference; 3) Goals scored; 4) Head-to-head points; 5) Away goals scored; 6) Draw.

==== Championship group ====
The first eight teams of the qualification phase competed in the Championship round. The teams took half of the points (rounded up to complete units) gained in the qualification as bonus with them.

2 March 1997 Round 1	Basel	1–0	Zürich	St. Jakob Stadium, Basel
15:00	Zuffi (yellow card) 3'; Giallanza (yellow card) 22' (goal) 55' (pen. 1:0); Ceccaroni (yellow card) 84'	FCZ summary FCB summary	(yellow card) 9' Andersen; (yellow card) 55' Shorunmu; (yellow card) 87' Konjić	Attendance: 22,000; Referee: (Switzerland) Kurt Zuppinger (Bremgarten, Aargau)

9 March 1997 Round 2	Zürich	1–1	St. Gallen	Letzigrund, Zürich
14:30	Nonda 38' (pen. 1:0)	FCZ summary	86' (1:1) Allenspach	Attendance: 6,800; Referee: (Switzerland) Cornu

23 March 1997 Round 3	Lausanne-Sport	2–0	Zürich	Olympique de la Pontaise, Lausanne
14:30	Ohrel 10' (1:0); Udovič 25' (2:0)	FCZ summary	(yellow card) 53' Fischer; (yellow card) 90' Walker	Attendance: 5,700; Referee: (Switzerland) Markus Nobs (Wohlen bei Bern)

26 March 1997 Round 4	Zürich	0–2	Grasshopper Club	Letzigrund, Zürich
20:00	Fischer (yellow card) 49'	FCZ summary	52' (0:1) Gren; 88' (0:2) Smiljanic	Attendance: 10,400; Referee: (Switzerland) Serge Muhmenthaler (Grenchen)

6 April 1997 Round 5	Zürich	0–0	Aarau	Letzigrund, Zürich
20:00	Nixon (yellow card) 49'	FCZ summary	(yellow card) 45' Hodel; (yellow card) 75' Pavlicevic	Attendance: 3,000; Referee: (Switzerland) Kurt Zuppinger (Bremgarten, Aargau)

13 April 1997 Round 6	Xamax	3–1	Zürich	Stade de la Maladière, Neuchâtel
20:00	Leśniak 32' (1:0); Kunz 50' (2:0); Gigon (yellow card) 70'; Perret (yellow card) 74'; Kunz 85' (3:1)	FCZ summary	(yellow card) 8' Di Jorio; (yellow card) 9' (yellow-red card) 84' J. Studer; 61' (o.g.) (Cyprien); (yellow card) 64' Mazzarelli; (red card) 75' Konjic	Attendance: 6,750; Referee: (Switzerland) Carlo Bertolini (Vira-Gambarogno)

19 April 1997 Round 7	Sion	3–1	Zürich	Stade Tourbillon, Sion
20:00	Chassot 26' (1:0); Lukić 74' (2:1); Wicky 78' (3:1)	FCZ summary	(yellow card) 44' Nixon; (yellow card) 50' Tejeda; (yellow card) 67' Di Jorio; 67' (1:1) Castillo; (yellow card) 79' Gambino	Attendance: 11,000; Referee: (Switzerland) Urs Meier (Wettingen and Würenlos)

26 April 1997 Round 8	Zürich	0–0	Sion	Letzigrund, Zürich
20:00		FCZ summary	(yellow card) 36' Quentin; (yellow card) 50' Biaggi	Attendance: 3,200; Referee: (Switzerland) Werner Müller (Obererlinsbach)

3 May 1997 Round 9	Zürich	0–0	Xamax	Letzigrund, Zürich
20:00	Tarone (yellow card) 35'	FCZ summary	(yellow card) 24' Vernier	Attendance: 3,200; Referee: (Switzerland) Claude Detruche, (Thônex)

10 May 1997 Round 10	Aarau	1–1	Zürich	Stadion Brügglifeld, Aarau
20:00	Pavlicevic 24' (1:0)	FCZ summary	(yellow card) 21' (yellow-red card) 51' Mazzarelli; 89' (1:1) Tejeda	Attendance: 4,100; Referee: (Switzerland) Dominique Tavel (Lonay)

15 May 1997 Round 11	Grasshopper Club	1–1	Zürich	Hardturm, Zürich
20:00	Smiljanic (yellow card) 39'; M. Yakin 82' (1:1)	FCZ summary	(yellow card) 34' Huber; 58' (0:1) Nixon	Attendance: 11,800; Referee: (Switzerland) Werner Müller (Obererlinsbach)

24 May 1997 Round 12	Zürich	1–2	Lausanne-Sport	Letzigrund, Zürich
20:00	Nonda 25' (1:1); Gambino (yellow card) 50'	FCZ summary	5' (0:1) Douglas; (yellow card) 67' Triki; 70' (1:2) Douglas; (yellow card) 79' Celestini	Attendance: 3,200; Referee: (Liechtenstein) Roland Beck (Triesenberg)

31 May 1997 Round 13	St. Gallen	1–2	Zürich	Espenmoos, St. Gallen
20:00	Dal Santo (yellow card) 62'; Regtop 83' (pen.)	FCZ summary	9' (0:1) Nixon; (yellow card) 49' Walker; (yellow card) 76' Tejeda; 80' (0:2) Nixon; (red card) 90+1' Weiler	Attendance: 6,000; Referee: (Switzerland) Philippe Leuba (Chexbres)

4 June 1997 Round 14	Zürich	1–1	Basel	Letzigrund, Zürich
20:00	Studer (yellow card) 39'; Studer 74' (1:1)	FCZ summary FCB summary	50' (0:1) La Placa	Attendance: 4,800; Referee: (Switzerland) Markus Nobs (Wohlen bei Bern)

==== Final league table ====
Pos	Team	Pld	W	D	L	GF	GA	GD	BP	Pts	Qualification
1	Sion	14	9	3	2	18	10	+8	19	49	Swiss champions, qualified for 1997–98 Champions League
2	Xamax	14	6	6	2	22	14	+8	22	46	qualified for 1997–98 UEFA Cup
3	Grasshopper Club	14	7	4	3	37	18	+19	20	45	qualified for 1997–98 UEFA Cup
4	Lausanne-Sports	14	8	2	4	20	16	+4	17	43	entered 1997 UEFA Intertoto Cup
5	Aarau	14	3	4	7	17	22	−5	18	31	entered 1997 UEFA Intertoto Cup
6	St. Gallen	14	3	4	7	13	26	−13	14	27	
7	Zürich	14	1	7	6	9	18	−9	14	24	
8	Basel	14	3	2	9	16	28	−12	13	24	

Source: rsssf.com
Rules for classification: 1) points; 2) Position in the qualification.

=== Swiss Cup ===
The first-tier clubs from the 1994–95 Nationalliga A were granted byes for the first two rounds, eight of them joined the competition in this round. The four clubs that were competing in the UEFA European competitions were granted byes for this round as well. The eight participating first-tier teams were seeded and cound not be drawn against each other. The draw respected regionalities, when possible, and the lower classed team was granted home advantage.

22 September 1996 Round 3	FC Uzwil	0–10	Zürich	Rüti, Uzwil
		FCZ summary	12' (0:1) Andersen; 28' (0:2) Andersen; 41' (0:3) Tarone; 50' (0:4) Tarone; 53' (0:5) Andersen; 60' (0:6) Castillo; 73' (0:7) Studer; 78' (0:5) Castillo; 82' (0:9) Mazzarelli; 88' (0:10) Di Jorio	Attendance: 1,600; Referee: (Switzerland) Massimo Busacca (Monte Carasso/Bellinzona)
Note: Uzwil played the 1996/97 season in the 3. Liga (sixth-tier

5 March 1997 Round	FC Wil	3–1	Zürich	Stadion Bergholz, Wil
	Puce 12' (1:1); Hafner 46' (2:1); Hafner (yellow card) 63'; Python 63' (3:1); Puce (yellow card) 65'	FCZ summary	12' (0:1) Andersen; (yellow card) 33' Nonda	Attendance: 1,600; Referee: (Switzerland) Nicolas Daina
Note: Wil played the 1996/97 season in the NLB (second-tier)

=== Friendly matches ===
==== Pre-season ====
16 June 1996 Exhibition game	Zürich	3–0	Yverdon-Sports	Allmend Brunau, Zürich
	Güntensperger 2' (1:0); N'Sunda 15' (2:0); Nonda 30' (3:0)	FCZ summary		Attendance: 100
Note: N'Sunda was a test player

19 June 1996 Exhibition game	Zürich	1–0	Lausanne-Sport	Linthstrasse, Tuggen
	Castillo 72' (1:0)	FCZ summary		Attendance: 150

23 June 1996 Exhibition game	FC Wallisellen	0–7	Zürich	Wallisellen
		FCZ summary	Goal
Note: Match as part of the 75th anniversary celebrations of FC Wallisellen.

23 June 1996 Exhibition game	Zürich	0–1	Baden	Allmend Brunau, Zürich
		FCZ summary	89' (0:1) Colacino

29 June 1996 Exhibition game	Lugano	3–3	Zürich	Rancate
	Ramondetta 25' (1:0); Manfreda 64' (2:2); Ramondetta 89' (3:3)	FCZ summary	31' (1:1) J. Studer; 59' (1:2) Castillo; 85' (2:3) J. Studer

5 July 1996 Exhibition game	Baden	0–0	Zürich
		FCZ summary
Note: Baden is the replacement opponent for FC Basel, who had to cancel the originally planned test match due to many injuries.

28 July 1996 Exhibition game	Zürich	3–1	Grasshopper Club	Letzigrund, Zürich
18:00	Fischer 46' (1:0); Nonda 52' (2:0); Castillo 71' (3:0)	FCZ summary	83' (3:1) Berger Jr.	Attendance: 5,000; Referee: (Switzerland) Dieter Schoch (Attiswil)
Note: Match as part of the FCZ 100th anniversary tournament (first semi-final). The match was interrupted in the 40th minute due to a severe thunderstorm.

29 July 1996 Exhibition game	Zürich	2–1	Juventus Turin	Letzigrund, Zürich
20:30	Nonda 19' (1:0); Castillo 23' (2:0)	FCZ summary	38' (2:1) Bokšić	Attendance: 14,000; Referee: (Switzerland) Kurt Zuppinger (Bremgarten, Aargau)
Note: Match as part of the FCZ 100th anniversary tournament (final)

23 August 1996 Mid-season	Zürich	4–0	Campo Grande	Stadion Gurzelen, Biel/Bienne
	Eddi; Eddi; Piu; Nixon	FCZ summary
Note: Eddi and Piu were both test-players

==== Winter break ====
31 January 1997 Exhibition game	Lugano	1–2	Zürich	Lugano
	(1:1)	FCZ summary	(0:1) Nonda (pen.)

10 February 1997 Exhibition game	D.C. United	1–2	Zürich	Tampa, Florida
	(1:2)	FCZ summary	(0:1) Baldassarri (0:2) Nonda

12 February 1997 Exhibition game	D.C. United	1–2	Zürich	Bradenton, Florida
	(1:2)	FCZ summary	(0:1) Andersen (0:2) Nonda

16 February 1997 Exhibition game	Luzern	0–3	Zürich	Unterallmend, (Root, Switzerland)
		FCZ summary	25' (0:1) Castillo; 71' (0:2) J. Studer; 87' (0:3) Castillo	Attendance: 650

19 February 1997 Exhibition game	Lausanne-Sport	2–1	Zürich	Lausanne campus
	Douglas 30' (1:0); Rehn 65' (2:0)	FCZ summary	88' (2:1) Castillo

22 February 1997 Exhibition game	Zürich	4–2	Schaffhausen	Letzigrund, Zürich
	Nonda 5' (1:0); Nixon 39' (2:0); Nonda 67' (3:0); Nonda 73' (4:1)	FCZ summary	71' (3:1) Agoye; 75' (4:2) Ogg	Attendance: 400

23 February 1997 Exhibition game	Zürich	3–0	YF Juventus	Letzigrund, Zürich
	Mazzarelli (1:0); Mazzarelli (2:0); Tejeda (3:0)	FCZ summary

== Sources ==
- dbFCZ Homepage
- Switzerland 1996–97 at RSSSF

Preceded by 1995–96	FC Zürich seasons	Succeeded by 1997–98
