= Stéphane Millereau =

French footballer (born 1976)

Personal information
- Date of birth: 26 August 1976 (age 50)
- Place of birth: Dole, France
- Height: 1.88 m (6 ft 2 in)
- Position: Forward

Senior career*
Years	Team	Apps	(Gls)
1994–1996	Mulhouse	15	(5)
1996–1997	Quimper		
1997	Étoile Carouge	9	(1)
1998	Bourg-Péronnas		
1998–1999	Dunkerque		
1999–2001	Alès		
2001–2002	Cherbourg		
2002–2003	Sète		
2003–2006	Pau		
2006–2007	Martigues		
2007–2008	Béziers		
2008–2009	PCAC Sète		
2009–2011	Béziers		
- * Club domestic league appearances and goals

Stéphane Millereau (born 26 August 1976) is a French former professional footballer who played as a forward.
