= Anastasios Salonidis =

Greek footballer

Personal information
- Date of birth: 10 June 1979 (age 47)
- Place of birth: Greece
- Height: 1.77 m (5 ft 10 in)
- Position: Defender

Senior career*
Years	Team	Apps	(Gls)
1996–1999	FC Wil 1900		
1998–1999	→ FC St. Gallen (loan)		
1999	Trikala		
2001?–2003	Kavala		
2003–2004?	Fostiras		
2004–2005	SC Young Fellows Juventus		
2005–2006	APEP FC		
2006–2007	FC Chur 97		
2008	SC Brühl		
- * Club domestic league appearances and goals

Anastasios Salonidis (Greek: Αναστάσιος Σαλωνίδης; born 10 June 1979) is a retired Greek football defender.
