= Alain Bonnafous =

French footballer (born 1969)

Personal information
- Full name: Alain Bonnafous
- Date of birth: 21 June 1969 (age 57)
- Place of birth: Montpellier, France
- Height: 1.77 m (5 ft 10 in)
- Position: Centre-back

Senior career*
Years	Team	Apps	(Gls)
1985–1988	Montpellier Réserve	12	(0)
1988–1992	Montpellier	16	(0)
1991	→ Olympique Alès (loan)	4	(0)
1991–1992	→ Olympique Alès (loan)	23	(0)
1992–1995	Chamois Niortais	108	(0)
1995–1997	Louhans-Cuiseaux	58	(0)
1997–1998	Kriens	0	(0)
- * Club domestic league appearances and goals

Alain Bonnafous (born 21 June 1969) is a French former professional footballer who played as a centre-back. He started his career with Montpellier HSC and made 16 appearances in Ligue 1 for the club. Between 1991 and 1992, he spent time on loan with Olympique Alès before moving to Chamois Niortais on a permanent transfer in August 1992. Bonnafous played 108 league matches in three seasons with the team before joining CS Louhans-Cuiseaux in the summer of 1995. After two seasons with Louhans-Cuiseaux, he moved to Switzerland to play for SC Kriens, where he ended his career.
