= Dariusz Szubert =

Polish footballer and coach (born 1970)

Personal information
- Full name: Dariusz Sylwester Szubert
- Date of birth: 31 October 1970 (age 55)
- Place of birth: Białogard, Poland
- Height: 1.77 m (5 ft 10 in)
- Position: Midfielder

Senior career*
Years	Team	Apps	(Gls)
1986–1987	Iskra Białogard		
1987–1994	Pogoń Szczecin		
1994–1996	FC St. Pauli	56	(6)
1996	VfB Oldenburg	13	(1)
1996–1997	FC Zürich	5	(0)
1997–1999	KFC Lommel	38	(3)
2000	Pogoń Szczecin	25	(5)
2001–2002	Widzew Łódź	1	(0)
2003	Pogoń Szczecin	12	(0)
2004–2007	Germania Egestorf/Langreder		

International career
- Poland Olympic
1994	Poland	3	(0)

Managerial career
- 2015: Goslarer SC
Medal record
Representing Poland
Men's football
Olympic Games
Silver medal – second place	1992 Barcelona	Team
- * Club domestic league appearances and goals

Dariusz Sylwester Szubert (born 31 October 1970) is a Polish football coach and former player who played as a midfielder.

== Honours ==
Poland Olympic

- Olympic silver medal: 1992
