= Bruno Sutter (footballer) =

Swiss footballer (born 1977)

Personal information
- Date of birth: 16 April 1977 (age 49)
- Place of birth: Langenthal, Switzerland
- Height: 1.76 m (5 ft 9 in)
- Position: Midfielder

Youth career
- FC Tössfeld
- 1993–1994: FC Oerlikon

Senior career*
Years	Team	Apps	(Gls)
1994–1995	YF Juventus		
1995–1997	FC Basel	61	(4)
1997–1998	FC Zürich	17	(1)
1998	FC Schaffhausen	17	(2)
1998–1999	FC Wil	13	(1)
1999–2002	AC Lugano	59	(5)
2002–2003	FC Wil	36	(5)
2003–2006	FC St. Gallen	70	(6)
2006–2010	FC Vaduz	73	(8)
2010–2011	SC Veltheim	24	(4)
2011–2012	FC Linth 04	20	(0)
2012–2013	SC Veltheim		
2013–2017	FC Töss		

Managerial career
- 2011–2012: FC Linth 04 (player-assistant)
- 2012–2013: SC Veltheim (player-assistant)
- 2016–2017: FC Töss (player-assistant)
- * Club domestic league appearances and goals

Bruno Sutter (born 16 April 1977) is a retired Swiss footballer who played as a midfielder.

== Career ==
=== Club career ===
Sutter spent his early years until he was 16, at FC Tössfeld in Winterthur, after which he moved to FC Oerlikon and a year later to Swiss 1. Liga club SC Young Fellows Juventus. After only one season, Sutter joined FC Basel in the Nationalliga A for their 1995–96 season under head coach Claude Andrey, signing his first professional contract. Sutter played his debut for his new club in the home game in the St. Jakob Stadium the 1995 UEFA Intertoto Cup match on 24 June 1995. He was substituted in during the 69th minute as Basel won 1–0 against Sheffield Wednesday. After playing in one test game and another three Intertoto Cup matches, he played his domestic league debut for the team in the home game on 19 July as Basel won 2–1 against Sion. During his first league matches he was used as a substitute, but by the end of August he advanced to become a regular in the starting formation. He scored his first goal for the club in the home game on 19 November. It was the first goal of the match as Basel won 2–1 against Aarau. Staying with the club for two seasons Sutter played a total of 86 games for Basel scoring a total of four goals. 61 of these games were in the Nationalliga A, five in the Swiss Cup, five in the Intertoto Cup and 15 were friendly games. He scored all four goals in the domestic league.

After that, Sutter played for several clubs in Switzerland, including FC Zürich, FC Schaffhausen, FC Wil and FC Lugano. In 2003, he went to FC St. Gallen. There, as with all of his clubs, he became an important player on the team and played in numerous games. In August 2006, he went to FC Vaduz. With Vaduz, he was promoted to the Axpo Super League for the 2008/09 season, a year later the team was relegated again. Sutter was also one of the best players in the Swiss Challenge League and was considered a racker in Switzerland.

=== Coaching and later career ===
In the 2010/11 season, Sutter said goodbye to professional sports and moved to the 3rd division of the Winterthur district club SC Veltheim, where he played for one season. He then joined FC Linth 04 in the summer of 2011 as a player-assistant coach, where his younger brother, Tobias Sutter, was also playing. He then returned to SC Veltheim for the 2012/13 season, also as a player-assistant.

He then joined FC Töss in the summer of 2013, where he has also worked as an assistant coach since 2016. On 18 June 2017, the club confirmed that he had retired as a player.
