= Martin Guzik =

Czech footballer

Personal information
- Date of birth: 7 April 1974 (age 52)
- Place of birth: Czechoslovakia
- Height: 1.79 m (5 ft 10 in)
- Position: Midfielder

Senior career*
Years	Team	Apps	(Gls)
1993–1994	SK České Budějovice	22	(1)
1994–1995	SK Sigma Olomouc	6	(0)
1996–1997	1. FC Bocholt	23	(4)
1997–1998	FC Zürich	18	(2)
1998	FC Baden		
1998–1999	FC Schaffhausen		
1999	KFC Uerdingen 05	16	(2)
2000	FC Chiasso		
2000–2001	Alemannia Aachen	6	(2)
2001–2002	1. FC Bocholt	18	(6)
2002	VfB Oldenburg	10	(3)
2002–2003	SK Hanácká Slavia Kroměříž		

International career
1993–1994	Czech Republic U21	4	(0)
- * Club domestic league appearances and goals

Martin Guzik (born 7 April 1974) is a Czech former professional footballer who played as a midfielder. He played in the Gambrinus liga for SK České Budějovice and SK Sigma Olomouc. He also played in the 2. Bundesliga in Germany for a season.

Guzik played international football at under-21 level for Czech Republic U21. He played in the 1993 Toulon Tournament.
