= Muhamed Konjić =

Bosnian footballer (born 1970)

Personal information
- Date of birth: 14 May 1970 (age 56)
- Place of birth: Tuzla, SFR Yugoslavia
- Height: 1.91 m (6 ft 3 in)
- Position: Centre-back

Senior career*
Years	Team	Apps	(Gls)
1988–1989	Famos Hrasnica	15	(0)
1989–1992	Sloboda Tuzla	21	(0)
1992–1993	Belišće	19	(0)
1993–1996	Zagreb	63	(5)
1994	→ Sarajevo (loan)	1	(0)
1996–1997	Zürich	36	(5)
1997–1999	Monaco	37	(2)
1999–2004	Coventry City	138	(4)
2004–2006	Derby County	16	(0)
Total		345	(16)

International career
1995–2006	Bosnia and Herzegovina	39	(3)
- * Club domestic league appearances and goals

Muhamed Konjić (Bosnian pronunciation: [muxǎmed kǒːɲitɕ]; born 14 May 1970) is a Bosnian former professional footballer who played as a centre-back, most notably for Monaco, Coventry City and the Bosnia and Herzegovina national team who he also captained.

== Club career ==
A solid defender, he played for many clubs around Europe including FC Zürich, AS Monaco, Coventry City and Derby County.

Konjić played in Jean Tigana's talented Monaco side which famously put Manchester United out of the Champions League in 1998 on away goals after a 1–1 draw at Old Trafford.

Early in 1999, Konjić was recruited by Gordon Strachan, manager of English Premiership side Coventry City for a fee of around £2 million. He became the first Bosnian to play in England’s top tier. Injuries prevented fans from getting a real glimpse of the player though, as he made just 19 appearances before the club's relegation at the end of the 2000–01 season.

In the next three seasons, all of which were spent in the Championship. 'Big Mo' (as he was nicknamed by Sky Blues fans) made 138 appearances, and scored four goals. During this period, Konjić had captained the club and became a fan favourite. He was renowned both for his fully committed style of play and also his willingness to bring the ball forward if the midfield and attack were not having any impact.

Konjić was sold at the end of the 2003–04 season to Derby County by then Sky Blues manager Peter Reid. In the 2004–05 season, he made 18 appearances in George Burley's Derby side which reached the Football League Championship play-offs. Injuries continued to hamper his progress, and he made just one appearance for Derby in the 2005–06 season as a result. He was released at the end of the season and subsequently retired from playing.

== International career ==
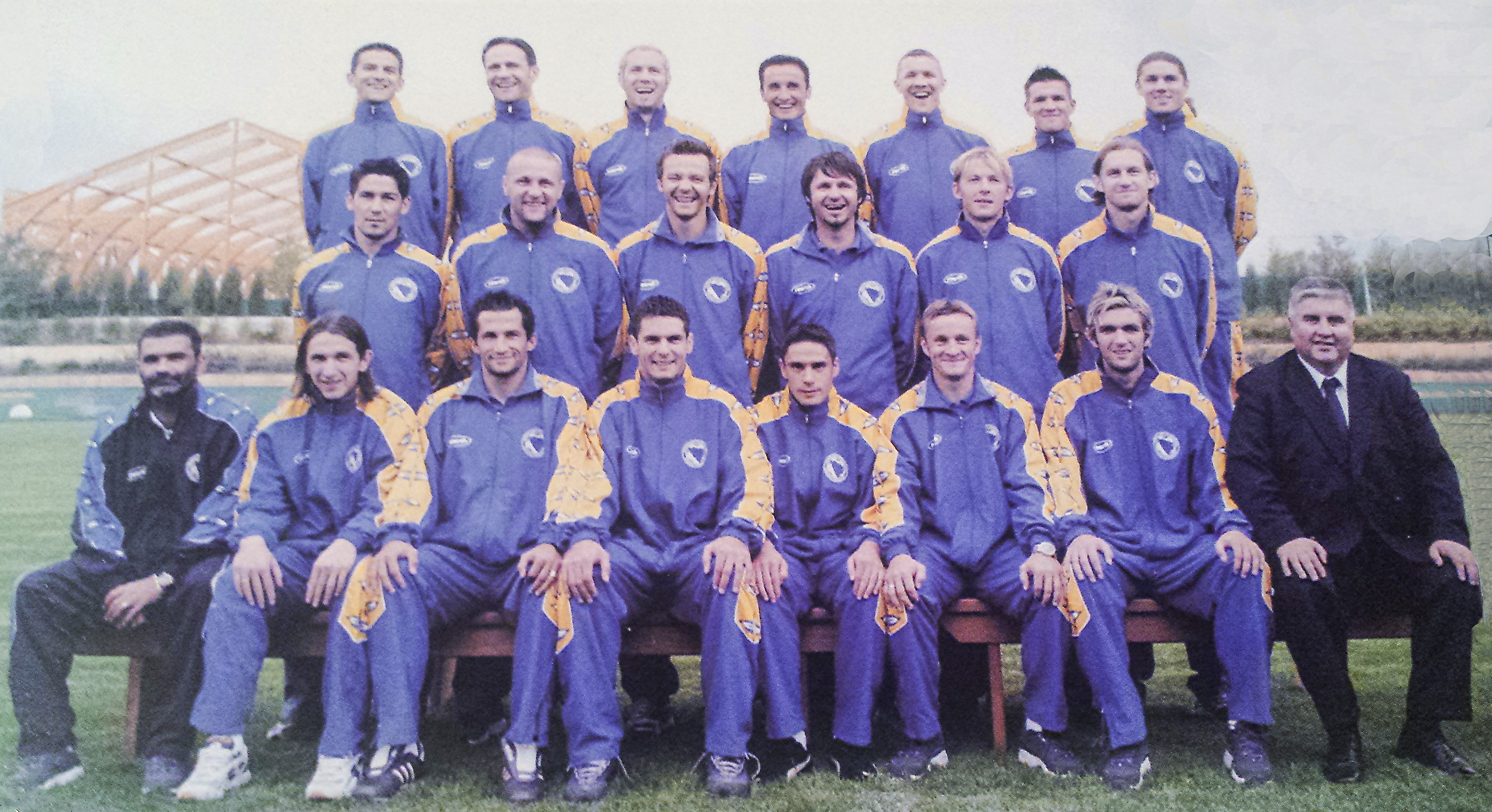
Bosnia and Herzegovina squad during UEFA Euro 2004 qualifying

Konjić was an influential player for the Bosnia and Herzegovina national team, for whom he was capped 39 times and scored 3 goals. He was the captain in the first match played by Bosnia and Herzegovina on 30 November 1995. This match, a 2–0 defeat to Albania, famously came just nine days after the Dayton Peace Agreement brought an end to the Bosnian War.

His final international was an August 2006 friendly match against France.

== Personal life ==
Konjić spent the first eight months of the Bosnian War in his country's army. After his military discharge he trained in the streets, often during artillery raids when everybody else was covering in bomb shelters or cellars.

== Career statistics ==
Scores and results list Bosnia and Herzegovina's goal tally first, score column indicates score after each Konjić goal.

List of international goals scored by Muhamed Konjić
No.	Date	Venue	Opponent	Score	Result	Competition
1	14 October 1998	Žalgiris Stadium, Vilnius, Lithuania	Lithuania	1–0	2–4	UEFA Euro 2000 qualifying
2	29 March 2000	Bilino Polje Stadium, Zenica, Bosnia and Herzegovina	North Macedonia	1–0	1–0	Friendly
3	7 October 2001	Koševo City Stadium, Sarajevo, Bosnia and Herzegovina	Liechtenstein	1–0	5–0	2002 FIFA World Cup qualification

== Honours ==
Individual

- Coventry City F.C. Player of the Year: 2003
