= Frédéric Chassot =

Swiss footballer (born 1969)

Personal information
- Date of birth: 31 March 1969 (age 57)
- Place of birth: Montagny, Fribourg, Switzerland
- Height: 1.75 m (5 ft 9 in)
- Position: Striker

Team information
- Current team: FC Sion (Director of Sport)

Youth career
- 1985–1987: FC Fribourg

Senior career*
Years	Team	Apps	(Gls)
1987–1995	Neuchâtel Xamax	215	(48)
1992–1993	→ FC Basel (loan)	13	(9)
1995–1996	Lausanne Sports	11	(1)
1996–1998	FC Sion	59	(14)
1998–2002	FC Zürich	107	(22)
2002	Neuchâtel Xamax	7	(4)
2002–2003	FC Aarau	31	(8)
2003–2004	Juventus Zürich	15	(13)
2004	FC Sion	20	(2)
Total		477	(122)

International career
1989–1999	Switzerland	16	(2)

Managerial career
- 2004–2007: FC Sion (assistant)
- 2008–2015: FC Sion (Director of Sport)
- 2011–2013: FC Sion U-21
- 2014: FC Sion
- 2016–2017: Fribourg
- * Club domestic league appearances and goals

Frédéric Chassot (French: [fʁedeʁik ʃaso]; born 31 March 1969) is a Swiss former footballer who played as a striker during the 1980s, 1990s and 2000s.

== Club career ==
Born in Montagny, Fribourg, Chassot began playing professionally with Neuchâtel Xamax in 1987 and by 1989 he was a first-team regular and a Swiss internationalist. He went on to play over 200 games for Xamax, scoring 48 goals and completing a loan spell at FC Basel.

In the second half of their 1992–93 season under head coach Friedel Rausch, Chassot signed a six month loan contract. He played his domestic league debut for his new club in the away game against SR Delémont on 28 February 1993. He scored his first goal for them in the same game, in fact he scored both goal as Basel won 2–0. Chassot scored a hat-trick in the home game in the St. Jakob Stadium on 12 June, the last game of the season, as Basel won 3–2 against the same opponents.

During his loan period Chassot played a total of 14 games for Basel scoring 9 goals. 13 of these games were in the Nationalliga A and the other was in the Swiss Cup. He scored all the goals in the domestic league.

In 1995, he joined Lausanne Sports but failed to make an impact and left for FC Sion a year later. He played for Sion for two seasons then signed for FC Zürich in 1998. In 2002, he returned to Neuchâtel Xamax for a short while, scoring four goals in seven matches. He then went on to play for FC Aarau from 2002 until 2003. He played for SC Young Fellows Juventus for the first half of the 2003–04 season, before he returned to Sion for the second half of that season and he retired from his active playing career in summer 2004.

Chassot became assistant manager of FC Sion's first team the following season. In 2008 Chassot was appointed as the club's Director of Sport. In 2011 he became manager of FC Sion U-21 team and at the same time remained Director of Sport. In June 2014 he stepped up to become manager of the club. He stepped down in September 2014 due to a series of bad results, but he continued as Director of Sport until the end of the season. In the season 2016–17 he was head coach of Fribourg.

== International career ==
Chassot was capped 16 times for the Swiss national team, making his debut in 1989. By 1991, he was long forgotten at international level but made a return in 1997 and went on to collect another eight caps.

== Honours ==
Neuchâtel Xamax

- Swiss Super Cup: 1988, 1990

FC Sion

- Swiss Championship: 1996–97
- Swiss Cup: 1996–97

FC Zürich

- Swiss Cup: 1999–2000

== Sources ==
- Die ersten 125 Jahre. Publisher: Josef Zindel im Friedrich Reinhardt Verlag, Basel. ISBN 978-3-7245-2305-5
- Verein "Basler Fussballarchiv" Homepage
