= Daniel Tarone =

Swiss footballer (born 1975)

Personal information
- Full name: Daniel Tarone
- Date of birth: 26 October 1975 (age 51)
- Place of birth: Switzerland
- Height: 1.77 m (5 ft 9 1/2 in)
- Position: Midfielder

Team information
- Current team: FC Wohlen
- Number: 17

Senior career*
Years	Team	Apps	(Gls)
1993–1999	FC Zürich	161	(8)
1999–2000	FC Aarau	25	(2)
2000–2001	AC Bellinzona	34	(6)
2001–2002	FC Aarau	27	(8)
2002–2005	FC Zürich	77	(8)
2005–2007	FC Schaffhausen	63	(6)
2007–2009	FC Aarau	24	(2)
2009–	FC Wohlen		

International career
	Switzerland U-21	17	(1)
- * Club domestic league appearances and goals as of 5 June 2008

Daniel Tarone (born 26 October 1975) is a Swiss football midfielder who is currently with FC Wohlen since leaving FC Aarau in the Swiss Super League.

== Honours ==
FC Zürich

- Swiss Cup: 2004–05
