= Ike Shorunmu =

Nigerian footballer (born 1967)

Personal information
- Full name: Ike Ibrahim Shorunmu
- Date of birth: 16 October 1967 (age 59)
- Place of birth: Lagos, Nigeria
- Height: 1.85 m (6 ft 1 in)
- Position: Goalkeeper

Senior career*
Years	Team	Apps	(Gls)
1990–1993	Stationery Stores		
1993–1994	Concord		
1994–1995	Shooting Stars		
1995–1996	Basel		
1996–1999	Zürich	71	(0)
1999–2001	Beşiktaş	33	(0)
2001–2002	Lucerne	7	(0)
2002–2005	Samsunspor	69	(0)
2005–2006	Juventus Zürich	1	(0)

International career
1992–2002	Nigeria	36	(0)

Managerial career
- 2005–2007: Nigeria (Goalkeeper Coach)
- 2007–2010: Enyimba (Goalkeeper Coach)
- 2010: Heartland (Goalkeeper Coach)
- 2011–2022: Nigeria (Goalkeeper Coach)
- 2022–2023: Nigeria (Goalkeeper Coach)
- * Club domestic league appearances and goals

Ike Ibrahim Shorunmu (born 16 October 1967) is a former Nigerian football goalkeeper.

== Career ==
Shorunmu was born in Lagos. After a few years in Nigeria he moved to play in Switzerland, and made his mark there. He was bought by Turkish club Beşiktaş J.K. in 1999 for $2,400,000 — but they released him as they thought he spent too much time with the national team. Shorunmu later played for other Swiss and Turkish clubs.

== International career ==
He has been the first-choice goalkeeper of the national team and played at the 2002 FIFA World Cup. Shorunmu was brought into the Nigerian national team by coach Clemens Westerhof in 1992.

== Coaching career ==
Shorunmu has recently served as the national team goalkeeper coach as well as for Enyimba F.C. In 2010 Shorunmu was hired in the same capacity for Heartland F.C.
