= Stefan Wolf =

Swiss footballer (born 1971)

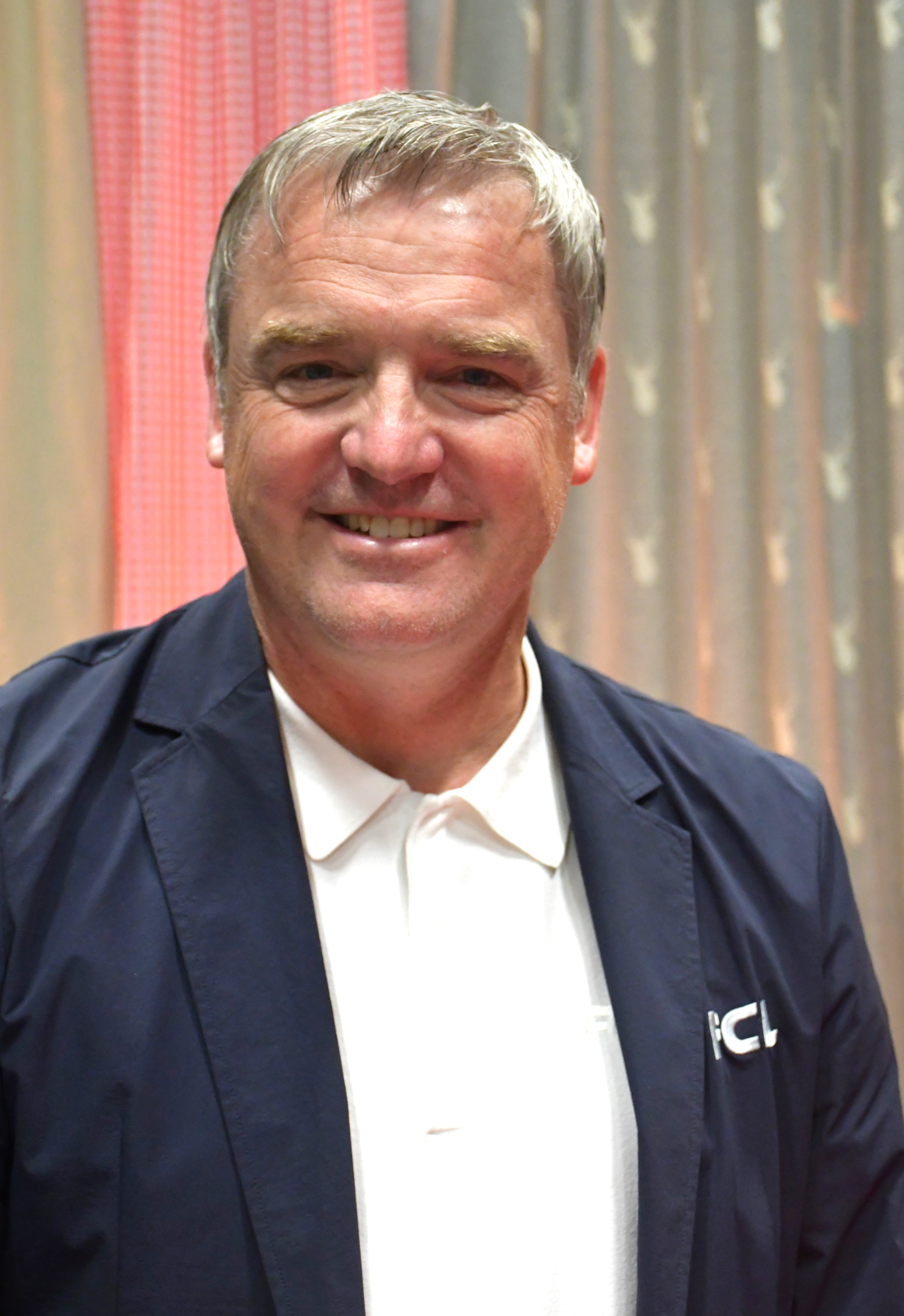

Personal information
- Date of birth: 31 January 1971 (age 55)
- Place of birth: Altbüron, Switzerland
- Height: 1.90 m (6 ft 3 in)
- Position: Central defender

Youth career
- –1990: FC Langenthal

Senior career*
Years	Team	Apps	(Gls)
1990–1997	FC Luzern	236	(34)
1997–1998	FC Sion	33	(3)
1998–2002	Servette FC	128	(10)
2002–2005	FC St. Gallen	80	(5)
2005–2006	FC St. Gallen II	3	(0)
Total		457	(46)

International career
1995–1999	Switzerland	14	(0)
- * Club domestic league appearances and goals

Stefan Wolf (born 31 January 1971) is a retired Swiss football defender. He became cup champion with FC Luzern and both league and cup champion with Servette FC.

Wolf was also chairman of the board at FC Luzern from 2021 to 2024.
