= Robert Huber (footballer) =

Swiss football player (born 1975)

Personal information
- Date of birth: 30 May 1975 (age 51)
- Place of birth: Muri, Switzerland
- Position: Defender

Senior career*
Years	Team	Apps	(Gls)
1995–1999	FC Zürich		
1991–1992	FC Winterthur		
- * Club domestic league appearances and goals

Robert Huber (born 30 May 1975) is a retired Swiss football defender.
