= André Wiederkehr =

Swiss football player (born 1970)

Personal information
- Date of birth: 20 April 1970 (age 56)
- Position: Midfielder

Senior career*
Years	Team	Apps	(Gls)
1988–1992	Grasshopper Club	45	(6)
1992–1993	FC Lausanne-Sport	15	(2)
1993–1994	Grasshopper Club	23	(2)
1994–1995	Neuchâtel Xamax	20	(4)
1995–1998	FC Aarau	86	(10)
1998–1999	FC Zürich	20	(0)
1999–2001	FC Aarau	56	(11)
2001	FC Luzern	17	(2)
2002–2004	Neuchâtel Xamax	63	(7)
2004–2005	FC Wil 1900	15	(1)
- * Club domestic league appearances and goals

André Wiederkehr (born 20 April 1970) is a retired Swiss football midfielder.
