= Ivan Dal Santo =

Swiss footballer (born 1972)

Personal information
- Date of birth: 12 January 1972 (age 54)
- Height: 1.76 m (5 ft 9 in)
- Position: Left-back

Team information
- Current team: FC Lachen/Altendorf (Manager)

Senior career*
Years	Team	Apps	(Gls)
1991–1993	FC Wettingen	53	(5)
1993–1995	FC Winterthur	60	(2)
1995–1996	Neuchâtel Xamax	1	(0)
1996–2003	FC St. Gallen	209	(8)
2003–2004	FC Zürich	29	(0)
2004–2005	Juventus Zürich	30	(2)
2005–2007	FC Luzern	64	(0)
2007–2009	FC Wohlen	44	(0)
2009–2010	FC Dietikon		
2010–2011	FC Oerlikon Polizei		

Managerial career
- 2009–2010: FC Dietikon (player-manager)
- 2010–2011: FC Oerlikon Polizei (player-manager)
- 2011-2014: Zug 94
- 2014–2016: FC Rapperswil-Jona (U15)
- 2016–2018: FC Luzern (U18)
- 2018–2019: FC Luzern II
- 2019–2021: FC Zürich Frauen
- 2022–: FC Lachen-Altendorf
- * Club domestic league appearances and goals

Ivan Dal Santo (born 12 January 1972) is a football manager and former player.

== Playing career ==
In 1991 Dal Santo was promoted from the youth to FC Wettingen's first-team squad.

A left-back, Dal Santo played 293 games in Swiss Super League and over 190 games in Challenge League. With FC St. Gallen, he won the 1999–2000 Nationalliga A and reached the final of the 1997–98 Swiss Cup.

== Coaching career ==
In the 2009–10 season, Dal Santo worked as a playing manager for FC Dietikon and later for FC Oerlikon Polizei in the 2010–11 season. From July 2011 to January 2014 he was the manager of Zug 94.

In June 2014, he was hired by Rapperswil-Jona as manager of the U15s. In the summer 2016, he took charge of FC Luzern's U18 squad. From the summer 2018, he was promoted to manager for the U21 reserve team.

From the end of May 2019 until January 2021, he was the manager for the women's team of FC Zürich.

He was appointed manager of FC Lachen-Altendorf in summer 2022.

== Style of play ==
A left-back, Dal Santo was known for his work rate, his attacking forays and a hard shot.

== Honours ==
St. Gallen

- Nationalliga A: 1999–2000
- Swiss Cup runner-up: 1997–98
