= Pascal Castillo =

Swiss football defender (born 1976)

Personal information
- Full name: Pascal Castillo
- Date of birth: 16 July 1976 (age 50)
- Place of birth: Switzerland
- Height: 1.83 m (6 ft 0 in)
- Position: Defender

Senior career*
Years	Team	Apps	(Gls)
1994–1997	FC Zürich	73	(12)
1997–1998	→ Lausanne Sports (loan)		
1998–2001	FC Zürich	66	(3)
2001	FC Winterthur		
2001–2005	Grasshoppers Zürich	48	(2)
2005	→ FC Luzern (loan)		
2005–2007	FC Winterthur	24	(0)
2007	→ SC Young Fellows Juventus (loan)	12	(1)
2007–2008	FC Regensdorf		
2008–2009	FC Blue Stars Zürich		
- * Club domestic league appearances and goals as of 6 February 2017

Pascal Castillo (born 16 July 1976) is a Swiss football (soccer) defender who is now retired.

During his career, Castillo played for FC Zürich, Lausanne Sports, FC Winterthur, Grasshoppers Zürich, FC Luzern, SC Young Fellows Juventus, FC Regensdorf and FC Blue Stars Zürich.
