= Marc Hodel =

Swiss footballer (born 1970)

Personal information
- Date of birth: 6 November 1970 (age 55)
- Height: 1.73 m (5 ft 8 in)
- Position: Defender

Senior career*
Years	Team	Apps	(Gls)
1989–1992	FC Baden	57	(0)
1992–1993	FC St. Gallen	34	(1)
1993–1996	FC Zürich	86	(1)
1996–1997	FC Aarau	31	(4)
1997	FC Sion	6	(2)
1997–1999	FC Zürich	44	(3)
1999–2003	Grasshopper Club	91	(4)
2003–2005	FC Wohlen	4	(0)
2005–2006	Inter Club Zurigo		
2006–2007	FC Neuenhof		
2007–2008	FC Lenzburg		
2008–2009	SV Schaffhausen	6	(0)

International career
1998–2000	Switzerland	13	(1)

Managerial career
- 2008–2009: SV Schaffhausen (player-manager)
- 2009: APEP Pitsilias
- 2024–: FC Schaffhausen (sporting director)
- * Club domestic league appearances and goals

Marc Hodel (born 6 November 1970) is a retired Swiss football defender.

He is the current sporting director of Swiss Challenge League club FC Schaffhausen.
