= Agent Sawu =

Zimbabwean footballer and manager (born 1971)

Personal information
- Date of birth: 24 October 1971 (age 54)
- Place of birth: Rhodesia (now Zimbabwe)
- Position: Striker

Senior career*
Years	Team	Apps	(Gls)
1990–1991	Zimbabwe Saints F.C.	84	(67)
1991–1992	APOP Kinyras Peyias	7	(0)
1993	Zimbabwe Saints F.C.	29	(16)
1993–1994	SC Kriens	14	(10)
1994–1998	FC Lucerne	122	(26)
1998–1999	BSC Young Boys	35	(5)
1999–2000	FC Basel	8	(0)
2000–2002	FC Wil	36	(28)
2002–2003	Chongqing Lifan	20	(7)
2003–2004	Dynamos F.C.	30	(20)
2004–2005	Bush Bucks		
2005–2007	Durban Stars F.C.		
2007–2008	City Pillars		

International career
1992–2004	Zimbabwe	5	

Managerial career
- 2011–2012: Zimbabwe Saints F.C. (assistant)
- 2012–: OR Tambo Cosmos
- * Club domestic league appearances and goals

Agent Sawu (born 24 October 1971) is a Zimbabwean former football striker and current manager.

He operated at Rising Stars Football Academy in Zimbabwe helping young kids across Bulawayo realize their talent and exploit to their maximum potential. He is currently part coaching staff at Bantu Rovers F.C in the Zimbabwean Top Flight league.

== Career ==
Sawu played club football in Zimbabwe before moving abroad to play in China, Cyprus, South Africa and Switzerland. He spent time with Premier Soccer League clubs Bush Bucks and Durban Stars before embarking on a coaching career in 2009.

=== International career ===
He was a member of the Zimbabwean 2004 African Nations Cup team, who finished bottom of their group in the first round of competition, thus failing to secure qualification for the quarter-finals.
