= Alexandre Comisetti =

Swiss footballer (born 1973)

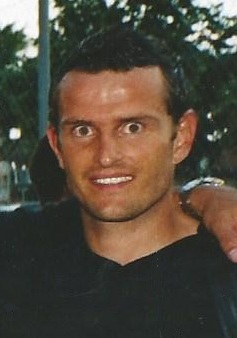

Personal information
- Date of birth: 21 July 1973 (age 53)
- Place of birth: Saint-Loup, Switzerland
- Height: 1.81 m (5 ft 11 in)
- Position: Left midfielder

Team information
- Current team: FC Echallens Région (Manager)

Youth career
- 1981–1983: Bercher
- 1983–1987: Yverdon
- 1987–1991: Lausanne

Senior career*
| Years | Team | Apps | (Gls) |
| 1991–1992 | Lausanne | 14 | (2) |
| 1992–1993 | Yverdon | 35 | (20) |
| 1993–1994 | Lausanne | 22 | (5) |
| 1994–1995 | Yverdon | 27 | (18) |
| 1995–1999 | Grasshopper | 96 | (17) |
| 1999–2001 | Auxerre | 40 | (4) |
| 2001–2004 | Servette | 63 | (9) |
| 2004–2005 | Le Mans | 25 | (3) |
| 2005–2007 | Lausanne | 33 | (2) |
| 2007–2008 | FC Echallens Région | 25 | (5) |
| Total | | 380 | (85) |

International career
| 1996–2001 | Switzerland | 30 | (4) |

Managerial career
- 2010–2014: Lausanne-Sport B
- 2013: Lausanne-Sport (caretaker)
- 2017–: FC Echallens Région
- * Club domestic league appearances and goals

Alexandre Comisetti (born 21 July 1973) is a former Swiss footballer. He is currently the manager of FC Echallens Région.

== Club career ==
He played for several clubs, including Lausanne Sports, Yverdon-Sport FC, Grasshoppers Zürich, AJ Auxerre (France), Le Mans UC72 and Servette Geneva.

He played for Switzerland national football team and was a participant at the 1996 UEFA European Championship.

== Coaching career ==
After retiring, Comisetti worked with the youth players at FC Lausanne-Sport as a kind of coordinator or advisor. He also worked as a consultant for Radio Télévision Suisse. Everything more or less started on the occasion of a Swiss-Japan, played in Austria. Alexandre Comisetti was on the set. He was so convincing that someone later asked him if he was interested in being the consultant for the Swiss team matches. From 2010, Comisetti was the manager of FC Lausanne-Sport's reserve team, better known as Team Vaud U21. From 22 October 2013 to 6 November, he was caretaker manager for the first team. He left the club at the end of the 2013/14 season.

In April 2017 it was announced, that Comisetti would be the manager of his former club FC Echallens Région from the 2017/18 season.
