= Daniel Puce =

Italian footballer (born 1970)

Personal information
- Date of birth: 25 July 1970 (age 56)
- Place of birth: Pavia, Italy
- Height: 1.87 m (6 ft 2 in)
- Position: Centre back

Senior career*
| Years | Team | Apps | (Gls) |
| 1989–1990 | Lausanne | | |
| 1990–1992 | Young Fellows Zürich | | |
| 1993–1994 | Monthey | | |
| 1995 | Sion | 7 | (0) |
| 1995–1996 | Meppen | | |
| 1996–1997 | Wil | 3 | (0) |
| 1997–2001 | Lausanne | 115 | (11) |
| 2001–2002 | Shanghai COSCO Huili | | |

Managerial career
- 2012–2014: Lutry
- * Club domestic league appearances and goals

Daniel Puce (born 25 July 1970) is an Italian former football defender and coach. During his career, Puce played for Lausanne, Monthey, Sion, Meppen, Wil, Shanghai COSCO Huili and Malley.
