= Francesco Di Jorio =

Swiss footballer (born 1973)

Personal information
- Full name: Francesco Di Jorio
- Date of birth: 22 September 1973 (age 53)
- Place of birth: Dielsdorf, Switzerland
- Height: 1.70 m (5 ft 7 in)
- Position: Midfielder

Senior career*
Years	Team	Apps	(Gls)
1991–1999	Zürich	174	(6)
1992–1993	→ Wettingen (loan)	30	(12)
1994–1995	→ Lausanne-Sports (loan)	26	(1)
1999–2001	Salernitana	32	(2)
2001–2002	St. Gallen	24	(3)
2002	Luzern	8	(2)
2003–2006	Zürich	91	(15)
2003	→ Sion (loan)	10	(4)
2006–2008	St. Gallen	43	(0)
2008–2010	Fenerbahce Zürich		
2010–2012	FC United Zürich		
2012–2013	FC Glattal Dübendorf		

International career
1998–2002	Switzerland	13	(0)
- * Club domestic league appearances and goals

Francesco Di Jorio or Franco Di Iorio (born 22 September 1973) is a former Swiss footballer. He played over 300 games in Swiss Super League.

== Honours ==
FC Zürich

- Swiss Cup: 2004–05
- Super League/Nationalliga A: 2005–06
