= René Weiler =

Swiss football manager (born 1973)

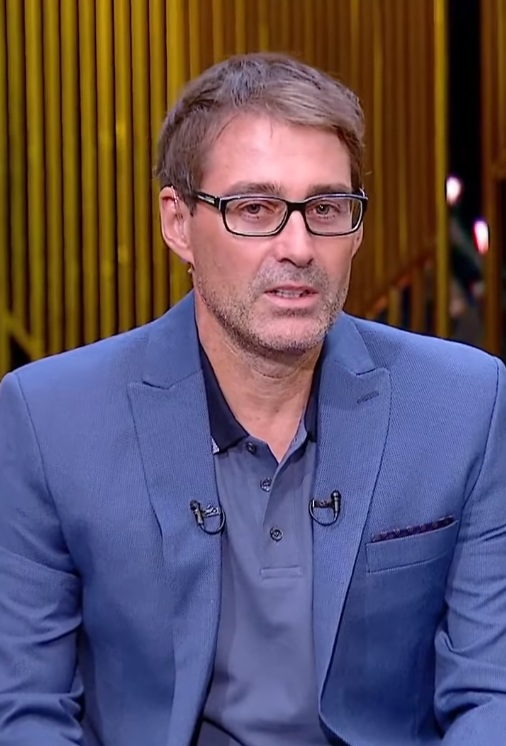
- Weiler in 2020

Personal information
- Date of birth: 13 September 1973 (age 53)
- Place of birth: Winterthur, Switzerland
- Height: 1.80 m (5 ft 11 in)
- Position: Defender

Senior career*
Years	Team	Apps	(Gls)
1990–1993	Winterthur		
1993–1994	Aarau	36	(2)
1994–1996	Servette	40	(0)
1996–1998	Zürich	35	(5)
1998–2001	Winterthur		

International career
1997	Switzerland	1	(0)

Managerial career
- 2005: St. Gallen (caretaker)
- 2009–2011: Schaffhausen
- 2011–2014: Aarau
- 2014–2016: 1. FC Nürnberg
- 2016–2017: Anderlecht
- 2018–2019: Luzern
- 2019–2020: Al Ahly
- 2021–2022: Kashima Antlers
- 2023–2024: Servette
- 2025–2026: D.C. United
- * Club domestic league appearances and goals

René Weiler (born 13 September 1973) is a Swiss professional football manager and former player who was most recently the head coach of Major League Soccer club D.C. United.

== Playing career ==
Weiler started his career 1990 with FC Winterthur, the club of his hometown, playing in the Challenge League. In 1992, he moved to FC Aarau who at the time were in the Swiss Super League. After only one season he changed sides with Servette FC, playing two seasons in Geneva and 41 games. From the 1996 season onwards, he played for FC Zürich for two seasons. He ended his career with his youth club FC Winterthur from 1998 to 2001. He retired in 2002.

== International career ==
Weiler played one game for the Swiss national team, a 2–1 defeat against Russia on 10 February 1997.

== Coaching career ==
=== Winterthur ===
Weiler became an assistant coach for Winterthur on 1 March 2001. He was interim head coach from June 2001 to July 2001 and from January 2002 to February 2002.

=== St. Gallen ===
He was head coach of St. Gallen between 9 October 2007 and 28 October 2007.

=== Aarau ===
Weiler became head coach of Aarau on 13 April 2011. He left Aarau on 21 May 2014.

=== 1. FC Nürnberg ===
Weiler became the new head coach of 1. FC Nürnberg on 12 November 2014.

=== RSC Anderlecht ===
He became the head coach of RSC Anderlecht on 1 July 2016. On 18 September 2017, he was sacked following a 3–0 away defeat to Bayern in the Champions League.

=== FC Luzern ===
He managed FC Luzern from 2018 to 2019.

=== Al Ahly ===
In 2019, he became the manager of Egyptian club Al Ahly. On 1 October 2020, Weiler departed Al Ahly after winning the Egyptian Premier League and Egyptian Super Cup.

=== Kashima Antlers ===
On 10 December 2021, he was appointed as the new manager of J1 League club Kashima Antlers ahead of the 2022 season.

On 7 August 2022, he departed the club by mutual consent.

=== Servette FC ===
On 20 March 2023, Servette FC announced Weiler as their coach for the upcoming season, taking over duties from Alain Geiger. On 2 June 2024, he won the Swiss Cup following a penalty shoot-out against FC Lugano in the final, giving Servette their first title in over 20 years. In an interview immediately after the final, he announced that he would be stepping down from his position as head coach, while still remaining at the club. On 11 June 2024, he was confirmed as Servette's new sporting director.

=== D.C. United ===
On 16 July 2025, D.C. United announced Weiler as the new head coach.

On 14 November 2026, he parted ways with the club.

== Managerial statistics ==
As of 7 November 2026

Team	From	To	Record							
Team	From	To	G	W	D	L	GF	GA	GD	Win %
St. Gallen (Caretaker)	13 April 2005	29 April 2005	3	1	1	1	5	4	+1	33.33
St. Gallen U21 (Caretaker)	1 July 2006	25 October 2007	23	12	3	8	35	27	+8	52.17
FC Schaffhausen	1 July 2009	13 April 2011	55	18	13	24	77	91	−14	32.73
FC Aarau	14 April 2011	30 June 2014	119	65	19	35	233	168	+65	54.62
1. FC Nürnberg	12 November 2014	30 June 2016	60	30	13	17	104	70	+34	50.00
R.S.C. Anderlecht	1 July 2016	18 September 2017	66	36	16	14	128	74	+54	54.55
FC Luzern	1 July 2018	17 February 2019	26	11	1	14	51	56	−5	42.31
Al Ahly SC	31 August 2019	1 October 2020	44	34	8	2	97	19	+78	77.27
Kashima Antlers	1 February 2022	7 August 2022	35	19	8	8	37	24	+13	54.29
Servette FC	1 July 2023	10 June 2024	58	24	20	14	85	64	+21	41.38
D.C. United	16 July 2025	Present	43	8	17	18	50	79	−29	18.60
Total			548	264	123	161	940	707	+233	48.18

== Honours ==
=== Club ===
Aarau

- Swiss Challenge League: 2012–13

RSC Anderlecht

- Jupiler Pro League: 2016–17
- Belgian Supercup: 2017

Al Ahly

- Egyptian Premier League: 2019–20
- Egyptian Super Cup: 2018

Servette

- Swiss Cup: 2023–24

=== Individual ===
- Belgian Professional Manager of the Year: 2016-17
