= Giuseppe Gambino =

Swiss footballer (born 1968)

Personal information
- Date of birth: 13 August 1968 (age 58)
- Position: Defender

Senior career*
Years	Team	Apps	(Gls)
1986–1995	FC St. Gallen		
1995–1998	FC Zürich		
1998–2000	FC Schaffhausen		
2000–2002	FC Wil 1900		
- * Club domestic league appearances and goals

Giuseppe Gambino (born 13 August 1968) is a retired Swiss football defender.
