= Lonay =

- Municipality
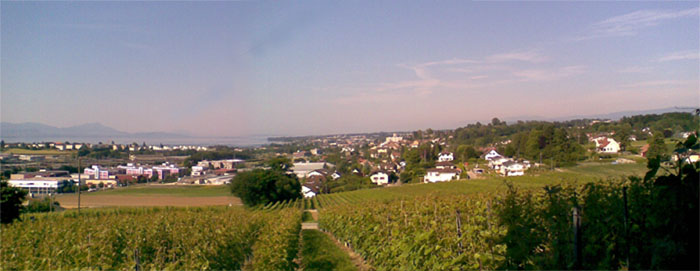
- Lonay village

- Flag Coat of arms
- Location of Lonay
- Location within Switzerland Location within Canton of Vaud
- Coordinates: 46°32′N 06°31′E
- Country: Switzerland
- Canton: Vaud
- District: Morges

Government
  - Mayor: Syndic; Philippe Guillemin

Area
  - Total: 3.71 km^{2} (1.43 sq mi)
- Elevation: 416 m (1,365 ft)

Population (2003)
  - Total: 2,047
  - Density: 552/km^{2} (1,430/sq mi)
- Time zone: UTC+01:00 (CET)
  - Summer (DST): UTC+02:00 (CEST)
- Postal code: 1027
- SFOS number: 5638
- ISO 3166 code: CH-VD
- Surrounded by: Bremblens, Denges, Échandens, Échichens, Morges, Préverenges
- Website: www.lonay.ch

Lonay (French pronunciation: [lɔnɛ]) is a municipality in the Swiss canton of Vaud, located in the district of Morges.

== History ==
Lonay is first mentioned around 1152–60 as Lonna. In 1177 it was mentioned as Losnay.

== Geography ==
Aerial view (1959)

Lonay has an area, as of 2009, of 3.7 square kilometers (1.4 mi^{2}). Of this area, 2.2 km^{2} (0.85 mi^{2}) or 59.3% is used for agricultural purposes, while 0.27 km^{2} (0.10 mi^{2}) or 7.3% is forested. Of the rest of the land, 1.2 km^{2} (0.46 mi^{2}) or 32.3% is settled (buildings or roads), 0.01 km^{2} (2.5 acres) or 0.3% is either rivers or lakes and 0.01 km^{2} (2.5 acres) or 0.3% is unproductive land.

Of the built up area, industrial buildings made up 2.2% of the total area while housing and buildings made up 15.4% and transportation infrastructure made up 12.9%. while parks, green belts and sports fields made up 1.1%. Out of the forested land, 5.9% of the total land area is heavily forested and 1.3% is covered with orchards or small clusters of trees. Of the agricultural land, 46.9% is used for growing crops and 1.1% is pastures, while 11.3% is used for orchards or vine crops. All the water in the municipality is flowing water.

The municipality was part of the Morges District until it was dissolved on 31 August 2006, and Lonay became part of the new district of Morges.

It consists of the village of Lonay and the hamlet of Roman.

== Coat of arms ==
The blazon of the municipal coat of arms is Or, a Vine eradicated Vert fructed Purpur between two Wheat-heads Vert, in Chief Gules a Cross Argent.

== Demographics ==
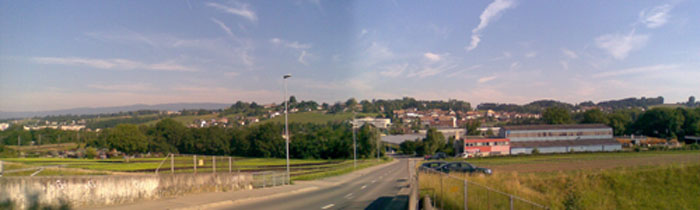
Panoramic of Lonay

Lonay has a population (as of December 2020) of 2,675. As of 2008, 19.9% of the population are resident foreign nationals. Over the last 10 years (1999–2009) the population has changed at a rate of 30.7%. It has changed at a rate of 31.6% due to migration and at a rate of -1.1% due to births and deaths.

Most of the population (as of 2000) speaks French (1,609 or 84.7%), with German being second most common (111 or 5.8%) and Italian being third (58 or 3.1%).

Of the population in the municipality 289 or about 15.2% were born in Lonay and lived there in 2000. There were 746 or 39.3% who were born in the same canton, while 369 or 19.4% were born somewhere else in Switzerland, and 444 or 23.4% were born outside of Switzerland.

In 2008 there were 18 live births to Swiss citizens and 4 births to non-Swiss citizens, and in same time span there were 20 deaths of Swiss citizens and 9 non-Swiss citizen deaths. Ignoring immigration and emigration, the population of Swiss citizens decreased by 2 while the foreign population decreased by 5. There were 8 Swiss men and 7 Swiss women who emigrated from Switzerland. At the same time, there were 15 non-Swiss men and 17 non-Swiss women who immigrated from another country to Switzerland. The total Swiss population change in 2008 (from all sources, including moves across municipal borders) was an increase of 90 and the non-Swiss population decreased by 9 people. This represents a population growth rate of 3.5%.

The age distribution, as of 2009, in Lonay is; 270 children or 11.3% of the population are between 0 and 9 years old and 322 teenagers or 13.4% are between 10 and 19. Of the adult population, 207 people or 8.6% of the population are between 20 and 29 years old. 299 people or 12.5% are between 30 and 39, 398 people or 16.6% are between 40 and 49, and 299 people or 12.5% are between 50 and 59. The senior population distribution is 228 people or 9.5% of the population are between 60 and 69 years old, 164 people or 6.8% are between 70 and 79, there are 160 people or 6.7% who are between 80 and 89, and there are 50 people or 2.1% who are 90 and older.

As of 2000, there were 698 people who were single and never married in the municipality. There were 954 married individuals, 153 widows or widowers and 95 individuals who are divorced.

As of 2000, there were 828 private households in the municipality, and an average of 2.3 persons per household. There were 286 households that consist of only one person and 54 households with five or more people. Out of a total of 840 households that answered this question, 34.0% were households made up of just one person and there were 7 adults who lived with their parents. Of the rest of the households, there are 249 married couples without children, 243 married couples with children There were 29 single parents with a child or children. There were 14 households that were made up of unrelated people and 12 households that were made up of some sort of institution or another collective housing.

In 2000 there were 319 single-family homes (or 67.4% of the total) out of a total of 473 inhabited buildings. There were 80 multi-family buildings (16.9%), along with 36 multi-purpose buildings that were mostly used for housing (7.6%) and 38 other use buildings (commercial or industrial) that also had some housing (8.0%). Of the single-family homes 21 were built before 1919, while 59 were built between 1990 and 2000. The greatest number of single-family homes (75) were built between 1946 and 1960. The most multi-family homes (22) were built between 1961 and 1970 and the next most (15) were built between 1981 and 1990. There were 5 multi-family houses built between 1996 and 2000.

In 2000 there were 889 apartments in the municipality. The most common apartment size was 3 rooms of which there were 224. There were 45 single-room apartments and 248 apartments with five or more rooms. Of these apartments, a total of 763 apartments (85.8% of the total) were permanently occupied, while 95 apartments (10.7%) were seasonally occupied and 31 apartments (3.5%) were empty. As of 2009, the construction rate of new housing units was 0.4 new units per 1000 residents. The vacancy rate for the municipality, in 2010, was 0.37%.

The historical population is given in the following chart:

== Sights ==
The entire village of Lonay is designated as part of the Inventory of Swiss Heritage Sites.

== Politics ==
In the 2007 federal election the most popular party was the SVP which received 23.47% of the vote. The next three most popular parties were the SP (21.27%), the FDP (15.61%) and the Green Party (11.34%). In the federal election, a total of 677 votes were cast, and the voter turnout was 49.1%.

== Economy ==
As of 2010, Lonay had an unemployment rate of 4.6%. As of 2008, there were 16 people employed in the primary economic sector and about 8 businesses involved in this sector. 432 people were employed in the secondary sector and there were 46 businesses in this sector. 1,417 people were employed in the tertiary sector, with 135 businesses in this sector. There were 930 residents of the municipality who were employed in some capacity, of which females made up 43.1% of the workforce.

In 2008 the total number of full-time equivalent jobs was 1,634. The number of jobs in the primary sector was 12, all of which were in agriculture. The number of jobs in the secondary sector was 396 of which 210 or (53.0%) were in manufacturing and 186 (47.0%) were in construction. The number of jobs in the tertiary sector was 1,226. In the tertiary sector; 486 or 39.6% were in wholesale or retail sales or the repair of motor vehicles, 258 or 21.0% were in the movement and storage of goods, 25 or 2.0% were in a hotel or restaurant, 91 or 7.4% were in the information industry, 4 or 0.3% were the insurance or financial industry, 91 or 7.4% were technical professionals or scientists, 24 or 2.0% were in education and 121 or 9.9% were in health care.

In 2000, there were 858 workers who commuted into the municipality and 722 workers who commuted away. The municipality is a net importer of workers, with about 1.2 workers entering the municipality for every one leaving. About 2.2% of the workforce coming into Lonay are coming from outside Switzerland. Of the working population, 16.1% used public transportation to get to work, and 64.3% used a private car.

== Religion ==
From the 2000 census, 638 or 33.6% were Roman Catholic, while 825 or 43.4% belonged to the Swiss Reformed Church. Of the rest of the population, there were 24 members of an Orthodox church (or about 1.26% of the population), there was 1 individual who belongs to the Christian Catholic Church, and there were 124 individuals (or about 6.53% of the population) who belonged to another Christian church. There were 4 individuals (or about 0.21% of the population) who were Jewish, and 31 (or about 1.63% of the population) who were Islamic. There were 10 individuals who were Buddhist. 221 (or about 11.63% of the population) belonged to no church, are agnostic or atheist, and 83 individuals (or about 4.37% of the population) did not answer the question.

== Education ==
In Lonay about 641 or (33.7%) of the population have completed non-mandatory upper secondary education, and 377 or (19.8%) have completed additional higher education (either university or a Fachhochschule). Of the 377 who completed tertiary schooling, 53.6% were Swiss men, 29.4% were Swiss women, 10.1% were non-Swiss men and 6.9% were non-Swiss women.

In the 2009/2010 school year there were a total of 348 students in the Lonay school district. In the Vaud cantonal school system, two years of non-obligatory pre-school are provided by the political districts. During the school year, the political district provided pre-school care for a total of 631 children of which 203 children (32.2%) received subsidized pre-school care. The canton's primary school program requires students to attend for four years. There were 173 students in the municipal primary school program. The obligatory lower secondary school program lasts for six years and there were 173 students in those schools. There were also 2 students who were home schooled or attended another non-traditional school.

As of 2000, there were 13 students in Lonay who came from another municipality, while 194 residents attended schools outside the municipality.
