= Julio Tejeda =

Swiss footballer (born 1971)

Personal information
- Date of birth: 31 July 1971 (age 55)
- Position: Midfielder

Senior career*
Years	Team	Apps	(Gls)
1991	FC Sion		
1993–1994	FC Monthey		
1994–1996	FC St. Gallen		
1996–1998	FC Zürich		
1998–1999	FC Lugano		
2000	Étoile Carouge FC		
- * Club domestic league appearances and goals

Julio Tejeda (born 31 July 1971) is a retired Swiss football midfielder.
