= 2000–01 FC Zürich season =

FC Zürich
2000–01 season
- Owner: Sven Hotz
- Club president: Sven Hotz
- Head-coach: Gilbert Gress
- Ground: Letzigrund
- 2000–01 NLA Qualification round: 8th of 12
- Championship round: 8th of 8
- 2000–01 Swiss Cup: Round 6
- 2000–01 UEFA Cup: Round 1
- Top goalscorer: League: Mikheil Kavelashvili (13); All: Mikheil Kavelashvili (15)

The 2000–01 season was FC Zürich's 104th season in their existence, since their foundation in 1896. It was their eleventh consecutive season in the top flight of Swiss football, following their promotion at the end of the 1989–90 season.

== Overview ==
The local businessman Sven Hotz was the club's chairman and patron at this time. He had taken over as club president, some 14 years earlier, at the AGM in 1986. In April of the previous season club president Hotz had fired head coach Raimondo Ponte without notice and had installed Gilbert Gress. with immediate effect. The affect made by that change was success, Gress led the team to five wins and two draws in the last seven matches of the promotion/relegation round. FCZ escaped the threatening relegation and retained their top level status. Therefore Hotz extended the contract as head-coach with Gress for a further season.

The FCZ first team competed in this years domestic first-tier 2000–01 Nationalliga A with the clear intention of retaining their top level status and reaching the championship group for the second half of the season. Which meant the team had to reach at least eighth position in the qualification round. The team also competed in 2000–01 Swiss Cup, where they were Cup holders. As the team had won the 1999–2000 Swiss Cup, they had qualified for the 2000–01 UEFA Cup and joined the competition in the first round. However, FCZ did not enter the 2000 UEFA Intertoto Cup.

FCZ played their home games in the Letzigrund, a stadium also used by the athletics club LC Zürich. The stadium originally opened in 1925, was partially rebuilt in 1973 and was modernised during the mid-90's. The stadium is located in the west of Zurich in the district of Altstetten, which is about three kilometers from the city center.

== Players ==
The following is the list of the FCZ first team squad this season. It also includes players that were in the squad the day the domestic league season started, on 15 July 2000, but subsequently left the club after that date.

Note: Flags indicate national team as defined under FIFA eligibility rules; some limited exceptions apply. Players may hold more than one non-FIFA nationality.

No.	Pos.	Nation	Player
—	GK	SUI	Marco Pascolo (league games: 34)
—	GK	ITA	Christian Trombini (league games: 1)
—	GK	SUI	Fabien Margairaz (league games: 2)
—	DF	SUI	Thierry Bonalair (league games: 3)
—	DF	CIV	Kanga Akalé (league games: 16)
—	DF	FRA	Alain Gaspoz (league games: 3)
—	DF	SUI	Pascal Castillo (league games: 14)
—	DF	MAR	Tariq Chihab (league games: 14)
—	DF	ITA	Giorgio Del Signore (league games: 18)
—	DF	SRB	Aleksandar Đorđević (league games: 2)
—	DF	SUI	Urs Fischer (league games: 35)
—	DF	ITA	Mauro Giannini (league games: 27)
—	DF	NED	Wilco Hellinga (league games: 26)
—	DF	SUI	Sébastien Jeanneret (league games: 12)
—	DF	SEN	Saidou Kébé (league games: 2)
—	DF	COD	David Opango (league games: 4)

No.	Pos.	Nation	Player
—	DF	SUI	David Pallas (league games: 28)
—	DF	SUI	Yvan Quentin (league games: 33)
—	DF	LIE	Martin Stocklasa (on loan to Kriens)
—	MF	SUI	Patrick Bühlmann (league games: 31)
—	MF	SUI	Philippe Douglas (league games: 12)
—	MF	LIE	Mario Frick (league games: 9)
—	MF	SUI	Marcel Heldmann (league games: 20)
—	MF	GEO	Gocha Jamarauli (league games: 33)
—	MF	SUI	Adnan Jashari (league games: 1)
—	MF	SUI	Vural Oenen (league games: 6)
—	MF	BRA	Renato (league games: 10)
—	FW	RSA	Shaun Bartlett (league games: 20)
—	FW	SUI	Mahir Cayir (league games: 1)
—	FW	SUI	Frédéric Chassot (league games: 26)
—	FW	GEO	Mikheil Kavelashvili (league games: 32)
—	FW	RHO	Adam Ndlovu (league games: 2)
—	FW	SUI	Ursal Yasar (league games: 2)

Players who joined the squad

The following is the list of players that joined the FCZ first team squad in the off or pre-season or during the winter-break transfer window. It also includes players that advanced from the youth team during the season and achieved at least one domestic league appearance.

Note: Flags indicate national team as defined under FIFA eligibility rules; some limited exceptions apply. Players may hold more than one non-FIFA nationality.

No.	Pos.	Nation	Player
—	MF	SUI	Patrick Bühlmann (from Lausanne-Sport)
—	FW	SUI	Mahir Cayir (from youth team)
—	DF	MAR	Tariq Chihab (from Chabab Mohammedia)
—	MF	SUI	Marcel Heldmann (from Aarau)
—	DF	NED	Wilco Hellinga (from Nürnberg)

No.	Pos.	Nation	Player
—	MF	SUI	Adnan Jashari (from youth team)
—	DF	SUI	Sébastien Jeanneret (from Servette)
—	GK	SUI	Fabien Margairaz (from Young Boys)
—	MF	SUI	Vural Oenen (from youth team)
—	MF	BRA	Renato (from Club Athletico Paranaense)
—	FW	SUI	Ursal Yasar (from youth team)

Players who left the squad

The following is the list of the FCZ first team players that left the squad, either during the previous season or in the off-season, before the new domestic season began.

Note: Flags indicate national team as defined under FIFA eligibility rules; some limited exceptions apply. Players may hold more than one non-FIFA nationality.

No.	Pos.	Nation	Player
—	DF	BEN	Alain Gaspoz (to Lugano)
—	DF	SUI	Diango Malacarne (to Young Boys)
—	DF	SUI	Mirsad Mijadinoski (youth team)
—	MF	FRA	Jean-Jacques Eydelie (to US Avranches)
—	MF	SUI	Daniel Gygax (to Winterthur)

No.	Pos.	Nation	Player
—	MF	ITA	Luca Iodice (to Bellinzona)
—	MF	BRA	Francisco Lima (to Lecce)
—	MF	BRA	Cesar Sant'Anna (to Crotone)
—	DF	LIE	Martin Stocklasa (on loan to Kriens)
—	MF	SUI	Dorjee Tsawa (to Bellinzona)
—	FW	RHO	Adam Ndlovu (to Highlanders)

== Results ==
Legend

Win Draw Loss Postponed

=== Nationalliga A ===
==== Qualification phase ====
The first stage of the NLA began on 15 July 2000 and was completed on 10 December. The top eight teams in the qualification phase would advance to the championship group and the last four teams would play against relegation.

15 July 2000 Round 1	Yverdon-Sports	1–1	Zürich	Stade Municipal, Yverdon
19:30	Costantino 70' (1:1); Costantino (yellow card)	FCZ summary	15' (0:1) Frick	Attendance: 1.500; Referee: (Switzerland) Guido Wildhaber (Kerzers)

18 July 2000 Round 2	Zürich	2–2	Servette	Letzigrund, Zürich
19:30	Frick 39' (1:2); Jamarauli 64' (2:2); Jamarauli (yellow card) 90+2'	FCZ summary	7' (0:1) Londono; 25' (0:2) Rey; (yellow card) 73' Pédat; (yellow card) 79' (yellow-red card) 89' Pizzinat	Attendance: 5,400; Referee: (Switzerland) Markus Nobs (Wohlen bei Bern)

18 July 2000 Round 3	Lugano	1–0	Zürich	Cornaredo, Lugano
19:30	Biaggi (yellow card) 32'; Giménez 47' (1:0)	FCZ summary		Attendance: 5,500; Referee: (Switzerland) Urs Meier (Wettingen and Würenlos)

29 July 2000 Round 4	Zürich	0–0	St. Gallen	Letzigrund, Zürich
19:30	Kavelashvili (yellow card) 25'	FCZ summary	(yellow card) 45' [Ionel Gane	Attendance: 6,700; Referee: (Switzerland) Andreas Schluchter (Schönenbuch)
Note: 46th minute, Bonalair substituted out and taken to hospital with broken ribs.

5 August 2000 Round 5	Aarau	2–1	Zürich	Stadion Brügglifeld, Aarau
19:30	Previtali 3' (1:1); Baudry 11' (2:1); Page (yellow card) 19'	FCZ summary	1' (0:1) Bartlett; (yellow card) 73' Giannini	Attendance: 3,900; Referee: (Switzerland) Philippe Leuba (Chexbres)

13 August 2000 Round 6	Lausanne-Sport	2–0	Zürich	Olympique de la Pontaise, Lausanne
16:15	Kuźba 9' (1:0); Puce (yellow card) 65'; Thiaw 75' (2:0)	FCZ summary		Attendance: 3,350; Referee: (Switzerland) Markus Nobs (Wohlen bei Bern)

20 August 2000 Round 7	Zürich	4–2	Luzern	Letzigrund, Zürich
16:15	Jamarauli 29' (1:0); Quentin (yellow card) 30'; Jamarauli (yellow card) 48'; Kavelashvili (yellow card) 53'; Kavelashvili 58' (2:0); Pallas (yellow card) 65'; Bartlett 86' (3:1); Chassot 90' (4:1)	FCZ summary	(yellow card) 21' Spycher; (yellow card) 63' Kottmann; 67' (2:1) Gian; 90+2' (4:2) Gian	Attendance: 3,300; Referee: (Switzerland) Gilles Golay

26 Sugust 2000 Round 8	Sion	3–3	Zürich	Stade Tourbillon, Sion
19:30	Sarni 5' (1:0); Renou 35' (2:1); Ojong 41' (3:1); Fayolle (yellow card) 45'; Duruz (yellow card) 90'	FCZ summary	13' (1:1) Kavelashvili; (yellow card) 13' Hellinga; (yellow card) 15' Castillo; 44' (3:2) Bartlett; (yellow card) 75' Fischer; 84' (3:3) Bartlett; (yellow card) 86' Bühlmann	Attendance: 6,900; Referee: (Liechtenstein) Roland Beck (Triesenberg)

5 September 2000 Round 9	Zürich	3–0	Xamax	Letzigrund, Zürich
19:30	Fischer (yellow card) 18'; Hellinga (yellow card) 25'; Kavelashvili 22' (1:0); Kavelashvili 55' (2:0); Kavelashvili (yellow card) 81'; Ndlovu 86' (3:0)	FCZ summary	(yellow card) 19' Koch; (yellow card) 45' Calapes	Attendance: 3,200; Referee: (Switzerland) Carlo Bertolini (Vira-Gambarogno)

8 September 2000 Round 10	Basel	1–1	Zürich	Stadion Schützenmatte, Basel
19:30	Cantaluppi (yellow card) 42'; Kreuzer 64' (pen.); Quennoz (yellow card) 72'	FCB summary FCZ summary	(yellow card) 21' Hellinga; (yellow card) 50' Giannini; 76' (1:1) Kavelashvili	Attendance: 7,186; Referee: (Switzerland) Reto Rutz (Amriswil)
Note: FCB without Ceccaroni and Savic (both injured). FCZ without Opango (long-term injured) Bonalair, Djordjevic and Margairaz (all injured). 34th minute: FCZ goalkeeper Pascolo left the pitch with a thigh injury and was replaced by Trombini. 16th minute: a header from Kreuzer hit the underside of the crossbar.

18 September 2000 Round 11	Zürich	1–1	Grasshopper Club	Letzigrund, Zürich
19:30	Bartlett 57' (1:1); Heldmann (yellow card) 82'	FCZ summary	(yellow card) 14' Esposito; (yellow card) 24' Smiljanić; 50' (0:1) Petrić; (yellow card) 55' Cabanas	Attendance: 12,500; Referee: (Switzerland) René Rogalla (Wallisellen)

22 September 2000 Round 12	Zürich	5–0	Yverdon-Sports	Letzigrund, Zürich
19:30	Bühlmann 3' (1:0); Bartlett 41' (2:0); Jamarauli 45' (3:0); Quentin (yellow card) 57'; Bartlett 65' (4:0); Jamarauli 66' (5:0)	FCZ summary	(yellow card) 56' Costantino; (yellow card) 88' Rochat	Attendance: 2,100; Referee: (Switzerland) Massimo Busacca (Monte Carasso/Bellinzona)

1 October 2000 Round 13	Servette	1–1	Zürich	Charmilles Stadium, Geneva
18:00	Diogo (yellow card) 29'; Petrov (yellow card) 42'; Jeanneret (yellow card) 58'; Petrov 71' (1:0)	FCZ summary	(yellow card) 42' Giannini; (yellow card) 49' Fischer; 72' (1:1) Jamarauli; (yellow card) 90+3' Pascolo	Attendance: 5,217; Referee: (Switzerland) Claudio Circhetta (Muttenz)

15 October 2000 Round 14	Zürich	1–2	Lugano	Letzigrund, Zürich
16:15	Kavelashvili (yellow card) 14'; Fischer (yellow card) 19'; Bühlmann 25' (pen.); Kavelashvili (yellow card) (yellow-red card) 90'	FCZ summary	15' (0:1) Giménez; (yellow card) 25' Biaggi; (yellow card) 26' Rota; (yellow card) 30' Lubamba; (yellow card) 32' Rossi; 42' (1:2) Rossi; (yellow card) (yellow-red card) 66' Rota	Attendance: 3,900; Referee: (Switzerland) Guido Wildhaber (Kerzers)

21 October 2000 Round 15	St. Gallen	2–0	Zürich	Espenmoos, St. Gallen
17:30	Contini 68' (1:0); Contini (yellow card) 81'; Gane 84' (2:0)	FCZ summary	(yellow card) 14' Oenen; (yellow card) 32' Hellinga	Attendance: 11,300; Referee: (Switzerland) Andreas Schluchter (Schönenbuch)

29 October 2000 Round 16	Zürich	1–0	Aarau	Letzigrund, Zürich
14:30	Jamarauli (yellow card) 78'; Chassot 85' (1:0)	FCZ summary	(red card) 54' Baldassarri	Attendance: 4,600; Referee: (Switzerland) Markus Nobs (Wohlen bei Bern)

15 November 2000 Round 18	Luzern	0–2	Zürich	Stadion Allmend, Luzern
16:15	Wyss (yellow card) 64'	FCZ summary	12' (o.g.) (Foletti); (yellow card) 34' Hellinga; 62' (0:2) Jamarauli	Attendance: 4,780; Referee: (Switzerland) Massimo Busacca (Monte Carasso/Bellinzona)

12 November 2000 Round 17	Zürich	3–1	Lausanne-Sport	Letzigrund, Zürich
14:30	Bartlett 5' (1:0); Hellinga (yellow card) 57'; Jamarauli 65' (2:1); Chassot 73' (3:1)	FCZ summary	16' (1:1) Karlen; (yellow card) 18' (yellow-red card) 64' Karlen; (yellow card) 30' Thiaw; (yellow card) 70' Puce	Attendance: 4,900; Referee: (Liechtenstein) Roland Beck (Triesenberg)

19 November 2000 Round 19	Zürich	1–3	Sion	Letzigrund, Zürich
14:30	Jamarauli (yellow card) 30'; Hellinga (yellow card) 55'; Kavelashvili 75' (1:1); Bühlmann (yellow card) 83'	FCZ summary	(yellow card) 37' Enílton; 38' (0:1) Enílton; (yellow card) 49' Sirufo; (yellow card) 60' Baubonne; (yellow card) 78' Tum; 80' (1:2) Sarni; 90+2' (1:3) Tum	Attendance: 5,300; Referee: (Switzerland) Andreas Schluchter (Schönenbuch)

26 November 2000 Round 20	Xamax	3–1	Zürich	Stade de la Maladière, Neuchâtel
14:30	Diop 29' (1:1); Camara 38' (2:1); Colomba (yellow card) 54'; Diop 90+1' (3:1)	FCZ summary	(yellow card) 17' (yellow-red card) 76' Del Signore; 24' (0:1) Heldmann	Attendance: 3,100; Referee: (Switzerland) Philippe Leuba (Chexbres)
Note: FCZ without Jamarauli (suspended).

3 December 2000 Round 21	Zürich	2–0	Basel	Letzigrund, Zürich
16:15	Kavelashvili 33' (pen.); Quentin (yellow card) 35'; Jamarauli 68' (2:0); Fischer (yellow card) 85'	FCB summary FCZ summary	(yellow card) 14' Varela; (yellow card) 21' Barberis; (yellow card) 32' Cantaluppi; (yellow card) 90' Magro	Attendance: 8,900; Referee: (Switzerland) Urs Meier (Wettingen and Würenlos)
Note: FCZ without Del Signore (suspended), as well as Castillo and Opango (both injured) and Ndlovu (was ill). FCB without Ceccaroni, Quennoz, Muff, and Aziawonou (all injured).

10 December 2000 Round 22	Grasshopper Club	2–3	Zürich	Hardturm, Zürich
16:15	Tararache (yellow card) 14'; Yakin (yellow card) 40'; Schwegler (yellow card); Chapuisat 70' (pen. 1:2); Bieli 83' (2:3)	FCZ summary	(yellow card) 1' Andreoli; 15' (0:1) Kavelashvili; 45' (pen. 0:2) Kavelashvili; (yellow card) 58' Fischer; (yellow card) 65' Hellinga; 73' (1:3) Jamarauli	Attendance: 10,400; Referee: (Switzerland) Massimo Busacca (Monte Carasso/Bellinzona)

==== League table ====
Pos	Team	Pld	W	D	L	GF	GA	GD	Pts	Qualification
1	Lugano	22	12	6	4	33	16	+17	42	Advance to championship round halved points (rounded up) as bonus
2	St. Gallen	22	11	7	4	43	18	+25	40	Advance to championship round halved points (rounded up) as bonus
3	Grasshopper Club	22	11	3	8	46	25	+21	36	Advance to championship round halved points (rounded up) as bonus
4	Lausanne-Sport	22	11	2	9	37	34	+3	35	Advance to championship round halved points (rounded up) as bonus
5	Basel	22	10	4	8	42	36	+6	34	Advance to championship round halved points (rounded up) as bonus
6	Servette	22	9	6	7	34	26	+8	33	Advance to championship round halved points (rounded up) as bonus
7	Sion	22	9	5	8	27	31	−4	32	Advance to championship round halved points (rounded up) as bonus
8	Zürich	22	8	7	7	36	29	+7	31	Advance to championship round halved points (rounded up) as bonus
9	Aarau	22	6	6	10	31	43	−12	24	Continue to promotion/relegation round
10	Yverdon-Sport	22	5	6	11	27	43	−16	21	Continue to promotion/relegation round
11	Xamax	22	6	2	14	21	53	−32	20	Continue to promotion/relegation round
12	Luzern	22	5	4	13	27	50	−23	19	Continue to promotion/relegation round

Source: RSSSF
Rules for classification: 1) points; 2) goal difference; 3) number of goals scored; 4) Head-to-head points; 5) Away goals scored; 6) Draw.

==== Championship round ====
The first eight teams of the qualification phase competed in the Championship round. The teams took half of the points (rounded up to complete units) gained in the qualification as bonus with them. This phase began on the week-end of Friday 23 February 2001 and was completed on 26 May.

Sat. 24 February 2001 Round 1	Lausanne-Sport	1–1	Zürich	Olympique de la Pontaise, Lausanne
17:30	Lutsenko (yellow card) 50'; Baudry (yellow card) 68' (yellow-red card) 76'; Gomes 90+2' (1:1)	FCZ summary	(yellow card) 56' Renato; 73' (0:1) Kavelashvili; (yellow card) 83' Quentin	Attendance: 2,200; Referee: (Liechtenstein) Roland Beck (Triesenberg)
Note: FCZ without Heldmann (injured).

4 March 2001 Round 2	Zürich	1–0	Servette	Letzigrund, Zürich
16:15	Renato (yellow card) 40'; Akalé 80' (1:0)	FCZ summary	(red card) 18' Lachor; (yellow card) 49' Fournier; (yellow card) 90+2' Pizzinat	Attendance: 3,900; Referee: (Switzerland) Guido Wildhaber (Kerzers)
Note: FCZ without Heldmann (injured).

11 March 2001 Round 3	Lugano	0–1	Zürich	Cornaredo, Lugano
14:30	Rota (yellow card) 15' (yellow-red card) 37'; Lubamba (yellow card); Giménez (yellow card) 73'	FCZ summary	52' (0:1) Bühlmann; (yellow card) 70' Pascolo	Attendance: 5,170; Referee: (Switzerland) Dieter Schoch (Attiswil)
Note: FCZ without Heldmann (injured).

18 March 2001 Round 4	Zürich	0–1	Grasshopper Club	Letzigrund, Zürich
16:15	Chihab (yellow card) 20'; Jeanneret (yellow card) 45'	FCZ summary	(yellow card) 24' Smiljanić; (yellow card) 44' Diop; 58' (0:1) Cabanas	Attendance: 15,500; Referee: (Switzerland) Carlo Bertolini (Vira-Gambarogno)
Note: FCZ without Heldmann (injured).

1 April 2001 Round 5	Zürich	0–0	Basel	Letzigrund, Zürich
16:15	Quentin (yellow card) 10'	FCB summary FCZ summary	(yellow card) 15' Kreuzer; (yellow card) 27' Ceccaroni; (yellow card) 26' Varela; (yellow card) 78' Muff	Attendance: 12,200; Referee: (Liechtenstein) Roland Beck (Triesenberg)
Note: FCZ without Jeanneret (suspended) and Heldmann (injured). FCB without Hakan Yakin (suspended), Koumantarakis, Cravero, Huggel, and Aziawonou (all injured).

6 April 2001 Round 6	St. Gallen	1–0	Zürich	Espenmoos, St. Gallen
20:15	Jairo 45' (1:0); Gane (yellow card) 56'; Nixon (yellow card) 62'	FCZ summary	(yellow card) 10' Renato; (yellow card) 51' Jamarauli	Attendance: 11,300; Referee: (Switzerland) Philippe Leuba (Chexbres)
Note: FCZ without Heldmann (injured).

16 April 2001 Round 7	Zürich	3–1	Sion	Letzigrund, Zürich
17:30	Bühlmann 29' (1:0); Jeanneret (yellow card) 39'; Jamarauli (yellow card) 60'; Akalé 88' (2:1); Chihab 90+1' (3:1)	FCZ summary	(yellow card) 40' Piffaretti; (yellow card) 40' Poueys; (yellow card) 58' Deumi; (yellow card) 77' Luyet; 81' (1:1) Sirufo	Attendance: 4,400; Referee: (Switzerland) Guido Wildhaber (Kerzers)
Note: FCZ without Heldmann (injured).

22 April 2001 Round 8	Sion	1–1	Zürich	Stade Tourbillon, Sion
16:15	Sirufo 29' (1:1); Furo (yellow card) 32'; Hottiger (red card) 90+3'	FCZ summary	9' (0:1) Kavelashvili; (yellow card) 14' Quentin; (yellow card) 29' Philippe Douglas; Hellinga (yellow card) 40'; Fischer (yellow card) 79'	Attendance: 7,600; Referee: (Switzerland) Massimo Busacca (Monte Carasso/Bellinzona)
Note: FCZ without Heldmann (injured).

29 April 2001 Round 9	Zürich	0–1	St. Gallen	Letzigrund, Zürich
16:15	Hellinga (yellow card) 41'	FCZ summary	(yellow card) 81' Eugster; 90+1' (pen.) Jairo	Attendance: 7,300; Referee: (Austria) Stefan Messner
Note: This match was played within the interaction referee exchange between the Swiss Football Association and the Austrian Football Association. FCZ without Heldmann (injured).

6 May 2001 Round 10	Basel	2–1	Zürich	St. Jakob-Park, Basel
16:15	Huggel 6' (1:0); H. Yakin 65' (2:0); Savić (yellow card) 67'	FCB summary FCZ summary	(yellow card) 11' (yellow-red card) 54' Renato; 71' (2:1) Chihab>	Attendance: 31,041; Referee: (Switzerland) Markus Nobs (Wohlen bei Bern)
Note: FCB without Varela (suspended), Barberis, Cantaluppi, Koumantarakis and Muff (injured). FCZ without Heldmann (injured).

11 May 2001 Round 11	Grasshopper Club	4–2	Zürich	Hardturm, Zürich
20:15	Núñez 15' (1:0); Camara 38' (2:0); Núñez 57' (3:1); Núñez 90+2' (4:2)	FCZ summary	44' (2:1) Bühlmann; 79' (3:2) Kavelashvili	Attendance: 11,200; Referee: (Switzerland) Urs Meier (Wettingen/Würenlos)

16 May 2001 Round 12	Zürich	1–2	Lugano	Letzigrund, Zürich
19:30	Jamarauli (yellow card) 37'; Chassot 41' (1:1); Jeanneret (yellow card) 49'	FCZ summary	2' (0:1) Giménez; 45' (pen. 1:2) Bastida; (yellow card) 54' Rossi; (yellow card) 85' Bullo	Attendance: 2,600; Referee: (Switzerland) Philippe Leuba (Chexbres)

19 May 2001 Round 13	Servette	2–0	Zürich	Charmilles Stadium, Geneva
20:15	Thurre 21' (1:0); Lonfat (yellow card) 70'; Oruma 90' (2:0)	FCZ summary	(yellow card) 76' Jamarauli	Attendance: 4,076; Referee: (Liechtenstein) Roland Beck (Triesenberg)

26 May 2001 Round 14	Zürich	1–2	Lausanne-Sport	Letzigrund, Zürich
20:15	Opango (yellow card) 36'; Kavelashvili 37' (1:0)	FCZ summary	(yellow card) 54' Simon; (yellow card) 66' Lutsenko; 71' (1:1) Meyer; 77' (1:2) Kuźba	Attendance: 1,300; Referee: (Switzerland) Andreas Schluchter (Schönenbuch)
Note: As protest against their own team, the entire FCZ South Stand made a boycott and stayed outside during first half.

==== Final league table ====
Pos	Team	Pld	W	D	L	GF	GA	GD	BP	Pts	Qualification
1	Grasshopper Club (C)	14	8	4	2	29	14	+15	18	46	Swiss champions. qualification to Champions League third qualifying round
2	Lugano	14	5	5	4	24	19	+5	21	41	Qualification to Champions League second qualifying round
3	St. Gallen	14	6	2	6	23	28	−5	20	40	qualification to UEFA Cup qualifying round
4	Basel	14	4	8	2	18	16	+2	17	37	entered Intertoto Cup second round
5	Servette	14	5	5	4	26	19	+7	17	37	Swiss Cup winners, qualification to UEFA Cup first round (Note: As 2000–01 Swiss Cup winner.)
6	Lausanne-Sport	14	4	3	7	15	27	−12	18	33	entered Intertoto Cup first round
7	Sion	14	4	4	6	16	22	−6	16	32	
8	Zürich	14	3	3	8	12	18	−6	16	28	

Source: RSSSF
Rules for classification: 1) points; 2) Position in the qualification.
(C) Champions
Notes:

Grasshopper Club won the championship and this was GC's 26th championship title to this date.

=== Swiss Cup ===
The 12 first-tier clubs from the 2000–01 Nationalliga A had been granted byes for the first four rounds and they joined the competition in the fifth round. The first-tier teams were seeded and cound not be drawn against each other. The draw respected regionalities, when possible, and the lower classed team was granted home advantage.

18 February 2001 Round 5	Locarno	0–4	Zürich	Stadio comunale Lido, Locarno
14:30		FCZ summary	11' (0:1) Kavelachvili; 23' (0:2) Giannini; 58' (0:3) Kavelachvili; 84' (0:4) Chihab	Attendance: 1,050; Referee: (Switzerland) Markus Nobs (Wohlen bei Bern)

15 March 2001 Round 6	Yverdon-Sport	1–0	Zürich	Stade Municipal, Yverdon
19:30	Gil Bala (yellow card); Gil Bala 81' (1:0); Bamba (yellow card) 83'	FCZ summary	(yellow card) 73' Chihab	Attendance: 650; Referee: (Switzerland) Andreas Schluchter (Schönenbuch)

At the end of the season, Servette won the cup and this was their seventh cup title to this date.

=== UEFA Cup ===
First round

14 September 2000 First leg	Zürich (Switzerland)	1–2	(Belgium) Genk	Letzigrund, Zürich
19:30	Bartlett 64' (1:1); Ndlovu (yellow card) 86'; Chassot (yellow card) 90+3'	UEFA report FCZ summary	(yellow card) 15' Zokora; (yellow card) 31' Delbroek; 52' (0:1) Paas; (yellow card) 72' Okoth; (yellow card) 90' Paas; 90+4' (1:2) Ban	Attendance: 4,561; Referee: Bruno Coué (France)

28 September 2000 Second leg	Genk (Belgium)	2–0 (4–1 agg.)	(Switzerland) Zürich	Cristal Arena, Genk
20:30	Daerden 31' (1:0); Delbroek (yellow card) 41'; Daerden (yellow card) 65'; Teelen (yellow card) 90'; Hendrikx 90+5' (2:0)	UEFA report FCZ summary	(yellow card) 75' Kavelashvili; (yellow card) 76' Castillo	Attendance: 8,500; Referee: Vasyl Melnychuk (Ukraine)

Genk won 4–1 on aggregate and advanced to the second round, where they were eliminated. At the end of the competition, Liverpool won the final with a golden goal in extra-time against Alavés for Liverpool's third title in this competition.

=== Friendly matches ===
==== Pre-season ====
23 June 2000 Exhibition game	Zürcher Unterland Selection	0–0	Zürich	Bülach
		FCZ summary		Attendance: Played behind closed doors
Note: A selection of amateur players from the regional 1. Liga and 2. Liga

30 June 2000 Pre-season	Zürich	1–2	Sochaux	Sportplatz Niederbrunn, Zürich
	Douglas 16' (1:0)	FCZ summary	35' (pen.); 80' (1:2)

2 July 2000 Pre-season	FC Oerlikon	1–7	Zürich	Sportanlage Neudorf, Oerlikon (Zürich)
	Bollinger 23' (1:1)	FCZ summary	20' (0:1) Chassot; 29' (1:2) Đorđević; 35' (1:3) Gygax; 44' (1:4); 50' (pen.) Douglas; 52' (1:6) Chassot; 60' (1:7) Akalé	Attendance: 750; Referee: (Switzerland) Marcel Vollenweider (Rüti, Zürich, Wald, Zürich)

5 July 2000 Pre-season	Zürich	2–0	Dyskobolia Grodzisk	Sportplatz Zelgli, Dübendorf
	Goal	FCZ summary

8 July 2000 Pre-season	FC Wangen bei Olten	1–5	Zürich	Sportplatz Chrüzmatt, Wangen bei Olten
	Goal	FCZ summary	(0:1) Ndlovu (0:2) Ndlovu (0:3) Frick (0:4) Frick (0:5) Chassot

==== Winter break ====
17 January 2001 Winter break	Zürich	2–2	Wil	Zürich
	Hellinga 26' (1:0); Opango 73' (2:2)	FCZ summary	34' (1:1) Fuchs; 60' (1:2) Neri

20 January 2001 Exhibition game	Zürich	1–0	Xamax	Hardhof, Zürich
	Kavelashvili 65' (1:0)	FCZ summary		Attendance: 100

25 January 2001 Winter break	AS Lucchese-Libertas	7–1	Zürich	Stadio Guidi, Galluzzo, Florence
	Beretta (1:0); Beretta 10' (2:0) (3:0) (4:0) (5:0) (6:1) (7:1)	FCZ summary	75' (5:1) Chassot

1 February 2001 Exhibition game	US Colligiana	0–2	Zürich	Coverciano, Florence
		FCZ summary	11' (0:1) Akalé; 58' (0:2) Chassot

3 February 2001 Exhibition game	Bellinzona	2–2	Zürich	Giubiasco
	Bugnard 25' (1:0); Edusei 90+3' (2:2)	FCZ summary	60' (1:1) Kavelashvili; 84' (1:2) Akalé

11 Febriary 2001 Exhibition game	Aarau	1–2	Zürich	Stadion Brügglifeld, Aarau
	Khomeriki 88' (1:2)	FCZ summary	56' (0:1) Giannini; 63' (0:2) Kavelashvili
Note: 72 minute, a shot from Kavelashvili hit the crossbar.

== Sources ==
- dbFCZ Homepage
- Switzerland 2000–01 at RSSSF

Preceded by 1999–2000	FC Zürich seasons	Succeeded by 2001–02
