= 1999–2000 FC Zürich season =

FC Zürich
1999–2000 season
- Owner: Sven Hotz
- Club president: Sven Hotz
- Head-coach: Raimondo Ponte until April 2000. from then Gilbert Gress
- Ground: Letzigrund
- 1999–2000 NLA Qualification round: 9th of 12
- Promotion/relegation NLA/NLB: 3rd of 8
- 1999–2000 Swiss Cup: Winners
- 1999–2000 UEFA Cup: Round 2
- Top goalscorer: League: Gocha Jamarauli (7); All: Gocha Jamarauli (13)

The 1999–2000 season was FC Zürich's 103rd season in their existence, since their foundation in 1896. It was their tenth consecutive season in the top flight of Swiss football, following their promotion at the end of the 1989–90 season.

== Overview ==
The local businessman Sven Hotz was the club's chairman and patron at this time. He had taken over as club president at the AGM in 1986. Raimondo Ponte had been the FCZ first team head-coach during the previous four and a quarter seasons and Hotz prolonged the contract with Ponte for a further season. The FCZ first team competed in this years domestic first-tier 1999–2000 Nationalliga A with the clear intention of retaining their top level status and reaching the championship group for the second half of the season. The team also competed in 1999–2000 Swiss Cup. At the end of the previous league season FCZ found themselves in the unloved fourth position in the table, one position behind the UEFA Cup qualifying round slot. However, as the Cup winners, Lausanne-Sport, finished in third position in the table, the UEFA Cup qualifying slot was passed down to the next placed team, thus FCZ profitised and qualified for the UEFA Cup. They did not enter the 1998 Intertoto Cup. The club announced that their aims for the team this season was to reach the top three positions in the league and challenge for the championship title, further to win the domestic cup competition and thus qualify for one of the UEFA European tournaments.

FCZ played their home games in the Letzigrund, a stadium also used by the athletics club LC Zürich. The stadium originally opened in 1925, was partially rebuilt in 1973 and was modernised during the mid-90's. The stadium is located in the west of Zurich in the district of Altstetten, which is about three kilometers from the city center.

During the early spring period, there was a trainer change. Head-coach Raimondo Ponte was fired and he was replaced by Gilbert Gress. Ponte's firing by club president Sven Hotz came as a direct consequence of a notorious administrative blunder. On 12 December 1999, Ponte accidentally listed eight foreign players on the match sheet instead of the maximum allowed seven. A hard-fought 1–1 draw on the last day of the qualification phase, against Neuchâtel Xamax, was subsequently overturned by the Swiss Football Association and was awarded as a 0–3 forfeit loss, plummeting FCZ out of the championship round and into the relegation playoffs. Following a poor run of form in the relegation round, capped by a 1–2 home defeat against FC Baden, Ponte was officially dismissed. Ponte was caught by journalistists, as he climbed out the window after the decision had been publisised, as he left his office.

== Players ==
The following is the list of the FCZ first team squad this season. It also includes players that were in the squad the day the domestic league season started, on 7 July 1999, but subsequently left the club after that date.

Note: Flags indicate national team as defined under FIFA eligibility rules; some limited exceptions apply. Players may hold more than one non-FIFA nationality.

No.	Pos.	Nation	Player
—	GK	SUI	Marco Pascolo (league games: 34)
—	GK	ITA	Christian Trombini (league games: 2)
—	DF	CIV	Kanga Akalé (league games: 6)
—	DF	SUI	Christian Andreoli (league games: 15)
—	DF	SUI	Pascal Castillo (league games: 25)
—	DF	ITA	Giorgio Del Signore (league games: 16)
—	DF	SRB	Aleksandar Đorđević (league games: 12)
—	DF	SUI	Urs Fischer (league games: 30)
—	DF	BEN	Alain Gaspoz (league games: 6)
—	DF	ITA	Mauro Giannini (league games: 28)
—	DF	SEN	Saidou Kébé (league games: 18)
—	DF	SUI	Diango Malacarne (league games: 1)
—	DF	SUI	Mirsad Mijadinoski (league games: 1)
—	DF	COD	David Opango (league games: 0)
—	DF	SUI	Yvan Quentin (league games: 32)

No.	Pos.	Nation	Player
—	DF	SUI	David Pallas (league games: 9)
—	DF	LIE	Martin Stocklasa (league games: 26)
—	MF	SUI	Philippe Douglas (league games: 21)
—	MF	FRA	Jean-Jacques Eydelie (league games: 11)
—	MF	LIE	Mario Frick (league games: 32)
—	MF	SUI	Daniel Gygax (league games: 3)
—	MF	ITA	Luca Iodice (league games: 2)
—	MF	GEO	Gocha Jamarauli (league games: 34)
—	MF	BRA	Francisco Lima (league games: 2)
—	MF	BRA	Cesar Sant'Anna (league games: 19)
—	MF	SUI	Dorjee Tsawa (league games: 13)
—	FW	RSA	Shaun Bartlett (league games: 30)
—	FW	SUI	Frédéric Chassot (league games: 26)
—	FW	GEO	Mikheil Kavelashvili (league games: 22)
—	FW	RHO	Adam Ndlovu (league games: 16)

Players who left the squad

The following is the list of the FCZ first team players that left the squad during the previous season or in the off-season, before the new domestic season began.

Note: Flags indicate national team as defined under FIFA eligibility rules; some limited exceptions apply. Players may hold more than one non-FIFA nationality.

No.	Pos.	Nation	Player
—	GK	BUL	Borislav Mihaylov (retired)
—	GK	NIG	Ike Shorunmu (to Beşiktaş)
—	GK	ITA	Christian Trombini (to Riccione Calcio)
—	DF	TUR	Selçuk Beyaz (to Kocaelispor)
—	DF	SUI	Marc Hodel (to Grasshopper Club41)
—	DF	SUI	Robert Huber (to Winterthur)
—	MF	SUI	Samir Albrecht (to Kriens)

No.	Pos.	Nation	Player
—	MF	SUI	Francesco Di Jorio (to Salernitana)
—	MF	SUI	Daniel Tarone (to Aarau)
—	MF	SUI	André Wiederkehr (to Aarau)
—	FW	CIV	Yacouba Bamba (to YF Juventus Zürich)
—	FW	SUI	Reto Burri (to Young Boys)
—	FW	SUI	Adrian Kunz (to Aarau)
—	FW	TTO	Jerren Nixon (to Yverdon-Sports)

== Results ==
Legend

Win Draw Loss Postponed

=== Nationalliga A ===
==== Qualification phase ====
The first stage of the NLA began on 7 July 1999 and was completed on 12 December. The top eight teams in the qualification phase would advance to the championship group and the last four teams would play against relegation.

7 July 1999 Round 1	Yverdon-Sports	1–1	Zürich	Stade Municipal, Yverdon
19:30	Jaquet (yellow card) 56'; Renfer 67' (1:1)	FCZ summary	(yellow card) 28' Giannini; 36' (0:1) Lima; (yellow card) 40' Frick	Attendance: 3,126; Referee: (Liechtenstein) Roland Beck (Triesenberg)
Note: FCZ without David Opango (longterm injury). 84th minute, Castillo is substituted off due to injury.

11 July 1999 Round 2	Zürich	0–0	Grasshopper Club	Letzigrund, Zürich
16:15	Lima (yellow card) 11'	FCZ summary	(yellow card) 20' Tararache; (yellow card) 24' Tikva; (yellow card) 39' Cabanas; (yellow card) 53' Haas; (yellow card) 78' Gren	Attendance: 12,200; Referee: (Switzerland) Philippe Leuba (Chexbres)
Note: FCZ without David Opango (longterm injury). 15th minute: FCZ player Chassot leaves the game with a torn shoulder ligament; 19th minute: a header from Haas hit the crossbar; 36th minute: GC coach Roger Hegi substitutes Tararache (who was already booked) out due to his overly impulsive play, Gürkan Sermeter came in; 45th minute: Cabanas deflected a shot from Bartlett onto the post.

18 July 1999 Round 3	St. Gallen	3–0	Zürich	Espenmoos, St. Gallen
16:15	Tsawa (yellow card) 26'; Zellweger (yellow card) 40'; Jairo 71' (1:0); Müller 85' (2:0); Hellinga 90' (pen.)	FCZ summary	(yellow card) 27' Bartlett; (yellow card) 58' Frick; (yellow card) 72' Quentin; (yellow card) 87' Giannini; (yellow card) 90' Andreoli	Attendance: 8,100; Referee: (Switzerland) Carlo Bertolini (Vira-Gambarogno)
Note: FCZ without David Opango (longterm injury) and Chassot (injured).

21 July 1999 Round 4	Zürich	3–1	Delémont	Letzigrund, Zürich
19:30	Giannini (yellow card) 12'; Sant'Anna (yellow card) 51'; Jamarauli 60' (1:0); Frick 90' (2:1); Bartlett 90+2' (3:1)	FCZ summary	79' (1:1) Ndlovu	Attendance: 3,600; Referee: (Switzerland) Guido Wildhaber (Kerzers)
Note: FCZ without David Opango (longterm injury) and Chassot (injured).

24 July 1999 Round 5	Servette	3–0	Zürich	Charmilles Stadium, Geneva
19:30	Wolf 6' (1:0); (yellow card) 73'Juarez; Durix 90' (2:0); Petrov 90+1' (3:0)	FCZ summary	(yellow card) 28' Pallas; (yellow card) 62' (yellow-red card) 83' Stocklasa	Attendance: 3,612; Referee: (Switzerland) Dominique Tavel (Lonay)
Note: FCZ without David Opango (longterm injury).

31 July 1999 Round 6	Zürich	1–1	Luzern	Letzigrund, Zürich
19:30	Frick 18' (1:0); Pascolo (yellow card) 80'; Fischer (yellow card) 90+1'	FCZ summary	(yellow card) 24' Gian; 52' (1:1) Gian; (yellow card) 80' Sander; (yellow card) Arnold	Attendance: 6,400; Referee: (Switzerland) Markus Nobs (Wohlen bei Bern)
Note: FCZ without David Opango (longterm injury). Abysmal performance by the refereeing trio.

7 August 1999 Round 7	Lausanne-Sport	2–0	Zürich	Olympique de la Pontaise, Lausanne
19:30	Kuźba 32' (1:0); Kuźba 49' (2:0); Pizzinat (yellow card) 63'; Diogo (yellow card) 68'	FCZ summary	(yellow card) 67' Quentin	Attendance: 3,300; Referee: (Switzerland) Andreas Schluchter (Schönenbuch)
Note: FCZ without David Opango (longterm injury). 28th minute, Christ was ssubstituted in for an injured Eduardo Magnin who was precautionately taken to hospital for an inspection.

15 August 1999 Round 8	Lugano	1–1	Zürich	Cornaredo, Lugano
16:15	Shakpoke (yellow card) 3' (Castillo) 32' (o.g.); Rossi (yellow card) 65'	FCZ summary	(yellow card) 30' Bartlett; 42' (1:1) Jamarauli	Attendance: 3,450; Referee: (Switzerland) Philippe Leuba (Chexbres)
Note: FCZ without David Opango (longterm injury).

21 August 1999 Round 9	Zürich	0–1	Aarau	Letzigrund, Zürich
19:30	Giannini (yellow card) 25'; Tarone (yellow card) 32' (yellow-red card) 76'; Quentin (yellow card) 45'	FCZ summary FCA summary	10' (0:1) Wiederkehr; (yellow card) Markovic	Attendance: 4,200; Referee: (Switzerland) Dominique Tavel (Lonay)
Note: FCZ without David Opango (long-term injury).

29 August 1999 Round 10	Basel	0–0	Zürich	Stadion Schützenmatte, Basel
16:15	Güner (yellow card) 57'	Summary; FCZ summary	(yellow card) 11' Eydelie; (yellow card) 34' Stocklasa; (yellow card) 45' Fischer	Attendance: 11,750; Referee: (Switzerland) Reto Rutz (Amriswil)
Note: FCB without Güntensperger, Fabinho, and Perez (all injured). FCZ without Giannini (suspended), Opango (long-term injury) Del Signore (injured).

11 September 1999 Round 11	Zürich	2–1	Xamax	Letzigrund, Zürich
19:30	Jamarauli 4' (1:0); Sant'Anna (yellow card) 23'; Bartlett (yellow card) 52' (Moret) 55' (og 2:1)	FCZ summary	(yellow card) 8' (yellow-red card) 8' Sene; 20' (1:1) Bieli; (yellow card) 77' Keller; (yellow card) 78' Tarik Sektioui	Attendance: 3,500; Referee: (Switzerland) Carlo Bertolini (Vira-Gambarogno)
Note: FCZ without David Opango (long-term injury). 8th minute David Sene with two yellow cards within a few seconds, the first for a foul, the second for unsportsmanlike conduct

20 September 1999 Round 12	Zürich	1–0	Yverdon-Sports	Letzigrund, Zürich
19:30	Sant'Anna (yellow card) 10'; Chassot 69' (1:0); Giannini (yellow card) 90'	FCZ summary	(yellow card) 13' Jaquet; (yellow card) 44' Enílton	Attendance: 3,100; Referee: (Switzerland) Nicole Petignat (Courgenay)
Note: FCZ without David Opango (long-term injury).

25 September 1999 Round 13	Grasshopper Club	2–1	Zürich	Hardturm, Zürich
19:30	Ekoku (yellow card) 25'; Smiljanić 31' (1:0); Chapuisat 90+1' (2:1)	FCZ summary	48' (o.g.) Gren; (yellow card) 77' Jamarauli; (yellow card) 78' Giannini; (yellow card) 90' Frick	Attendance: 11,200; Referee: (Switzerland) René Rogalla (Wallisellen)
Note: FCZ without David Opango (long-term injury).

3 October 1999 Round 14	Zürich	1–3	St. Gallen	Letzigrund, Zürich
16:15	Quentin (yellow card) 45'; Ndlovu 48' (1:3); Eydelie (red card) 63'	FCZ summary	13' (0:1) Thüler; 16' (0:2) Contini; 43' (0:3) Jairo; (yellow card) 43' Zellweger; (yellow card) 63' Hellinga; (yellow card) 73' Eugster	Attendance: 6,100; Referee: (Switzerland) Urs Meier (Wettingen and Würenlos)
Note: FCZ without David Opango (long-term injury).

17 October 1999 Round 15	Delémont	2–2	Zürich	La Blancherie, Delémont
14:30	Fabinho 18' (1:0); Rytchkov (yellow card) 34'; Klötzli (yellow card) 43'; Drakopulos 60' (2:0); Itamar (yellow card) 62'; Doc Bui (yellow card) 63'	FCZ summary	(yellow card) 36' Andreoli; (yellow card) 42' Stocklasa; 63' (2:1) Frick; 75' (2:2) Frick; (yellow card) 88' Chassot; (red card) 90' Đorđević	Attendance: 3,880; Referee: (Switzerland) Gilles Golay

24 October 1999 Round 16	Zürich	2–0	Servette	Letzigrund, Zürich
14:30	Bartlett 32' (1:0); Douglas 38' (2:0); Kébé (yellow card) 63'; Jamarauli (yellow card) 89'; Quentin (yellow card) 90'	FCZ summary		Attendance: 3,800; Referee: (Switzerland) Dominique Tavel (Lonay)

31 October 1999 Round 17	Luzern	0–1	Zürich	Stadion Allmend, Luzern
19:30	Trninic (yellow card) 30'	FCZ summary	34' (0:1) Giannini; (yellow card) 70' Kébé	Attendance: 7,097; Referee: (Switzerland) Philippe Leuba (Chexbres)

7 November 1999 Round 18	Zürich	2–2	Lausanne-Sport	Letzigrund, Zürich
14:30	Jamarauli 19' (1:0); Douglas 27' (2:0); Quentin (yellow card) 68'; Ponte (head-coach, not on pitch (yellow card) (yellow-red card) 81'	FCZ summary	32' (2:1) Mazzoni; 38' (2:2) Londono; (yellow card) 62' Pizzinat	Attendance: 5,500; Referee: (Switzerland) Massimo Busacca (Monte Carasso/Bellinzona)
Note: FCZ without Opango (long-term injury). 81st minute, FCZ head-coach Ponte sent to the stands for complaining.

21 November 1999 Round 19	Zürich	2–1	Lugano	Letzigrund, Zürich
14:30	Kébé (yellow card); Gaspoz 34' (1:0); Kébé 54' (2:0); Sant'Anna (yellow card) 76'	FCZ summary	(yellow card) 38' Lombardo; 66' (2:1) Rossi	Attendance: 3,900; Referee: (Switzerland) Andreas Schluchter (Schönenbuch)

28 November 1999 Round 20	Aarau	1–1	Zürich	Stadion Brügglifeld, Aarau
16:15	Wiederkehr 59' (1:1)	FCZ summary	(yellow card) 42' Eydelie; 55' (0:1) Kavelashvili; (yellow card) 72' Chassot; (yellow card) 82' Fischer	Attendance: 1,800; Referee: (Switzerland) Philippe Leuba (Chexbres)
Note: FCZ without Opango (long-term injury).

5 December 1999 Round 21	Zürich	0–1	Basel	Letzigrund, Zürich
14:30	Stocklasa (yellow card) 22'; Eydelie (yellow card) 36'	FCB summary FCZ summary	27' (0:1) Koumantarakis; (yellow card) 53' Tschopp	Attendance: 6,600; Referee: (Liechtenstein) Roland Beck (Triesenberg)
Note: FCZ without Opango (long-term injury), Del Signore, Chassot, Djordjevic and Kawelaschwili (all injured) as well as Giannini (ill, flu). Basel without Ceccaroni, Tholot, and Fabinho (all injured) as well as Perez and Calapes (both ill). 25th minute: a goal from Sant'Anna was disallowed for offside.

12 December 1999 Round 22	Xamax	(1–1); 3–0 Forfeit	Zürich	Stade de la Maladière, Neuchâtel
14:30	Bieli 50' (1:1)	FCZ summary	(yellow card) 40' Andreoli; 46' (0:1) Fischer	Attendance: 9,200; Referee: (Switzerland) Urs Meier (Wettingen and Würenlos)
Note: Immediately after the match, Xamax lodged a formal protest regarding the result, as FCZ had listed eight foreign players on the team sheet instead of the permitted seven. The association's arbitration tribunal ruled in Xamax's favor, and the match was awarded to them by default.

==== Qualification table ====
Pos	Team	Pld	W	D	L	GF	GA	GD	Pts	Qualification
1	St. Gallen	22	13	6	3	42	25	+17	45	Advance to championship round halved points (rounded up) as bonus
2	Basel	22	9	10	3	31	21	+10	37	Advance to championship round halved points (rounded up) as bonus
3	Lausanne-Sport	22	9	9	4	35	25	+10	36	Advance to championship round halved points (rounded up) as bonus
4	Grasshopper Club	22	9	7	6	40	25	+15	34	Advance to championship round halved points (rounded up) as bonus
5	Yverdon-Sports	22	7	9	6	28	25	+3	30	Advance to championship round halved points (rounded up) as bonus
6	Xamax	22	7	7	8	34	33	+1	28	Advance to championship round halved points (rounded up) as bonus
7	Luzern	22	8	4	10	28	29	−1	28	Advance to championship round halved points (rounded up) as bonus
8	Servette	22	8	4	10	32	36	−4	28	Advance to championship round halved points (rounded up) as bonus
9	Zürich	22	6	8	8	21	29	−8	26	Continue to promotion/relegation round
10	Aarau	22	7	5	10	30	42	−12	26	Continue to promotion/relegation round
11	Lugano	22	5	6	11	27	34	−7	21	Continue to promotion/relegation round
12	SR Delémont	22	4	5	13	24	48	−24	17	Continue to promotion/relegation round

Source: rsssf.com

==== Promotion/relegation group NLA/NLB ====
The teams in the ninth to twelfth positions in Nationalliga A competed with the top four teams of Nationalliga B in a Nationalliga A/B promotion/relegation round. This phase began on 12 March 2000 and was completed on 7 June.

12 March 2000 Round 1	Aarau	0–0	Zürich	Stadion Brügglifeld, Aarau
14:30	Tarone (yellow card) 32'; Roembiak (yellow card) 39'; Skrzypczak (yellow card) 53'; Heldmann (yellow card)	FCZ summary		Attendance: 4,200; Referee: (Switzerland) Philippe Leuba (Chexbres)
Note: FCZ without Opango (long-term injury).

18 March 2000 Round 2	Zürich	4–0	Bellinzona	Letzigrund, Zürich
17:30	Chassot 6' (1:0); Tsawa 14' (2:0); Pascolo (yellow card) 15'; Jamarauli (yellow card) 26' (Izzo) 45' (o.g.); Ndlovu 47' (4:0)	FCZ summary	(penalty missed) 16′ Lustrinelli; (yellow card) 59' Del Signore; (yellow card) 59' Lombardo; (yellow card) 73' Izzo	Attendance: 4,200; Referee: (Switzerland) Dieter Schoch (Attiswil)
Note: FCZ without Opango (long-term injury). 16th minute, FCZ goalkeeper Marco Pascolo saved the penalty kick from Mauro Lustrinelli.

26 March 2000 Round 3	Thun	0–1	Zürich	Stadion Lachen, Thun
14:30	Haller (yellow card) 90+3'	FCZ summary	45' (0:1) Chassot; (yellow card) 48' Jamarauli; (yellow card) 84' Giannini; (yellow card) 85' Chassot	Attendance: 3,020; Referee: (Liechtenstein) Roland Beck (Triesenberg)
Note: FCZ without Opango (long-term injury).

1 April 2000 Round 4	Zürich	0–3	Delémont	Letzigrund, Zürich
17:30	Đorđević (yellow card) 33'; Del Signore (yellow card) 52' (yellow-red card) 68'; Frick (yellow card) 53'; Bartlett (yellow card) 60' (yellow-red card) 64'; Fischer (yellow card) 69'	FCZ summary	29' (0:1) Fabinho; (yellow card) 35' A. Alexandrov; 45' (o.g.) (Giannini); (yellow card) 50' Thommen; 72' (0:3) Koudou	Attendance: 2,700; Referee: (Austria) Bernhard Brugger
Note: All yellow cards were given for fouls and, due to the very agresive play of both teams, this match was very difficult to arbitrate for the Austrian Bernhard Brugger. The match was part of the interaction referee exchange between the Swiss Football Association and the Austrian Football Association.

8 April 2000 Round 5	Sion	1–0	Zürich	Stade Tourbillon, Sion
19:30	Grichting (yellow card) 39'; Maslow 43' (1:0); Baubonne (yellow card) 63'; Piffaretti (yellow card) 89'	FCZ summary	(yellow card) 45' Castillo; (yellow card) 55' Quentin; (yellow card) 68' Đorđević	Attendance: 5,900; Referee: (Switzerland) Andreas Schluchter (Schönenbuch)
Note: FCZ without Opango (long-term injury), Del Signor and Bartlett (both suspended).

15 April 2000 Round 6	Zürich	1–2	Baden	Letzigrund, Zürich
19:30	Stocklasa (yellow card) 24'; Jamarauli 49' (1:1); Frick (yellow card) 50'; Quentin (yellow card) 71'	FCZ summary	(yellow card) 26' Pavlović; 29' (0:1) Pavlović; (yellow card) 53' Oldani; (yellow card) 55' Balmer; (yellow card) 66' Zmoos; (yellow card) 84' Lelis; 90+3' Oldani	Attendance: 2,900; Referee: (Switzerland) Gilles Golay
Note: FCZ without Opango (long-term injury).

22 April 2000 Round 7	Lugano	2–1	Zürich	Cornaredo, Lugano
19:30	Michaël Hoy 14' (1:0); Rossi 62' (2:0)	FCZ summary	76' (2:1) Chassot; (yellow card) 3' (yellow-red card) 90' Đorđević	Attendance: 4,500; Referee: (Switzerland) Urs Meier (Wettingen and Würenlos)
Note: FCZ: the first match with Gilbert Gress on the side line as head-coach.

29 April 2000 Round 8	Zürich	2–1	Lugano	Letzigrund, Zürich
19:30	Kavelashvili 15' (1:0); Tsawa (yellow card) 69'; Kavelashvili 77' (2:1); Kavelashvili (yellow card) 78'; Fischer (yellow card) 90+1'	FCZ summary	(yellow card) 6' Zagorčić; 51' (1:1) Giménez	Attendance: 4,700; Referee: (Switzerland) Reto Rutz (Amriswil)
Note: FCZ without Opango (long-term injury) and Đorđević (suspended).

7 May 2000 Round 9	Baden	0–1	Zürich	Esp Stadium, Fislisbach
14:30	Mehmeti (yellow card) 14' (yellow-red card) 38'; (yellow card) 62' Dnibi	FCZ summary	74' (0:1) Frick	Attendance: 2,000; Referee: (Switzerland) Claudio Circhetta (Muttenz)

14 May 2000 Round 10	Zürich	2–2	Sion	Letzigrund, Zürich
16:15	Bartlett 37' (1:1); Jamarauli 90+2' (2:2)	FCZ summary	24' (0:1) Maslow; (yellow card) 35' Bahoken; 50' (1:2) Maslow; (yellow card) 90+3' Vernaz	Attendance: 4,300; Referee: (Switzerland) Nicole Petignat (Courgenay)
Note: FCZ without Opango (long-term injury).

18 May 2000 Round 11	Delémont	0–2	Zürich	La Blancherie, Delémont
19:30		FCZ summary	5' (0:1) Jamarauli; (yellow card) 29' Tsawa; (yellow card) 43' Frick; (yellow card) 56' Quentin; (yellow card) 59' Pallas; (yellow card) 79' Đorđević; 80' (0:2) Bartlett	Attendance: 1,850; Referee: (Switzerland) Gilles Golay

23 May 2000 Round 12	Zürich	2–1	Thun	Letzigrund, Zürich
19:30	Bartlett 80' (1:1); Bartlett 90+1' (2:1)	FCZ summary	19' (0:1) Berisha; (yellow card) 48' Born	Attendance: 4,100; Referee: (Switzerland) Guido Wildhaber (Kerzers)
Note: FCZ without Opango (long-term injury).

4 June 2000 Round 13	Bellinzona	0–0	Zürich	Stadio Comunale, Bellinzona
16:15	Bugnard (yellow card) 23'; Morocutti (yellow card) 43'; Dutuel (yellow card) 79'; Seoane (yellow card) 89'	FCZ summary	(yellow card) 13' Tsawa; (yellow card) 81' Đorđević	Attendance: 5,800; Referee: (Switzerland) Andreas Schluchter (Schönenbuch)
Note: FCZ without Opango (long-term injury).

7 June 2000 Round 14	Zürich	1–0	Aarau	Letzigrund, Zürich
19:30	Del Signore (yellow card) 44'; Đorđević (yellow card) 54'; Del Signore 59' (1:0); Kavelashvili (yellow card) 65'	FCZ summary	(yellow card) 37' Skrzypczak	Attendance: 16,500; Referee: (Switzerland) Dieter Schoch (Attiswil)
Note: Free admission for over 3,500 visitors.

==== Final table ====
Pos	Team	Pld	W	D	L	GF	GA	GD	Pts	Promotion or relegation
1	Lugano	14	8	4	2	26	18	+8	28	Remain in NLA
2	Sion (P)	14	7	3	4	28	19	+9	24	Promoted to NLA
3	Zürich	14	7	3	4	17	12	+5	24	Remain in NLA
4	Aarau	14	6	4	4	23	16	+7	22	Remain in NLA
5	Bellinzona	14	4	8	2	21	14	+7	20	Remain in NLB
6	Thun	14	4	4	6	17	18	−1	16	Remain in NLB
7	Delémont (R)	14	4	2	8	18	29	−11	14	Relegated to NLB
8	Baden	14	1	2	11	7	31	−24	5	Remain in NLB

Source: rsssf.com
Rules for classification: 1) points; 2) goal difference; 3) number of goals scored.
(P) Promoted; (R) Relegated

=== Swiss Cup ===
The 1999–2000 Swiss Cup was the 75th season of Switzerland's annual football cup competition. It began on 7 August with the first games of Round 1 and ended on 28 May 2000 with the Final held at Wankdorf, Bern. The winners earned a place in the first round of the UEFA Cup. The 12 first-tier clubs from the 1999–2000 Nationalliga A had been granted byes for the first four rounds and they joined the competition in the fifth round on 13/14 November. The first-tier teams in round 5 were seeded and cound not be drawn against each other. The draw respected regionalities, when possible, and the lower classed team was granted home advantage.

14 November 1999 Round 5	Wil	1–2	Zürich	Stadion Bergholz, Wil
14:30	Šlekys (yellow card) 75'; Vifian 90+4' (1:2)	FCZ summary	(yellow card) 31' Chassot; 51' (0:1) Frick; (yellow card) 54' Kébé; (yellow card) 78' Andreoli; 82' (0:2) Jamarauli	Attendance: 2,750

4 March 2000 Round 6	Étoile-Carouge	0–1	Zürich	Stade de la Fontenette, Carouge
17:30	Ebe (yellow card) 62'	FCZ summary	58' (0:1) Chassot; (yellow card) 64' Tsawa; (yellow card) 67' Del Signore	Attendance: 990; Referee: (Switzerland) Markus Nobs (Wohlen bei Bern)

11 April 2000 Quarter-final	Thun	1–2 (a.e.t.)	Zürich	Stadion Lachen, Thun
	Okpala 55' (1:1)	FCZ summary	1' (0:1) Tsawa; (yellow card) 72' Giannini; (yellow card) 78' Quentin; 117' (1:2) Ndlovu	Attendance: 2,376; Referee: (Switzerland) Massimo Busacca (Monte Carasso, Ticino)

4 May 2000 Semi-final	Zürich	7–2 (a.e.t.)	Luzern	Letzigrund, Zürich
20:15	Bartlett 18' (1:1); Bartlett 79' (2:2); Bartlett 94' (3:2); Frick 98' (4:2); Del Signore 107' (pen.); Jamarauli 113' (6:2); Chassot 116' (7:2)	FCZ summary	7' (0:1) Frei; 78' (1:2) Gian; (yellow card) 78' Branca; (red card) 117' Gian	Attendance: 7,300; Referee: (Switzerland) Markus Nobs (Wohlen)

28 May 2000 Final	Zürich	2–2 (a.e.t.) (3–0 p)	Lausanne-Sport	Wankdorf, Bern
15:00	Quentin (yellow card) 39'; Tsawa (yellow card) 45'; Del Signore (yellow card) 57'; Frick (yellow card) 60'; Jamarauli 77'; Đorđević (yellow card) 91'; Bartlett 95'; Fischer (yellow card) 111'; Bartlett (yellow card) 95' (yellow-red card) 112'	Fussball-Schweiz summary FCZ summary	35' Danilevičius; (yellow card) 85' Hänzi; 105' Gerber; (yellow card) 120+2' Horjak	Attendance: 18,500; Referee: (Switzerland) Carlo Bertolini (Vira)
	Penalties
	Fischer (penalty scored); Douglas (penalty scored); Kavelashvili (penalty scored)		(penalty missed) Ohrel; (penalty missed) Londono; (penalty missed) Christ

Zürich won the cup and this was the club's sixth cup title to this date.

=== UEFA Cup ===
==== Qualifying round ====
The qualifying round matches of the 1999–2000 UEFA Cup were played on 12 and 26 August 2000.

12 August 1999 First leg	Sliema Wanderers (Malta)	0–3	(Switzerland) Zürich	Ta' Qali National Stadium, Ta' Qali
19:30	Policano (yellow card) 65'; Bergodi (yellow card) 88'	UEFA report FCZ summary	35' (0:1) Kavelashvili; (yellow card) 55' Giannini; 79' (0:2) Bartlett; (yellow card) 90+2' Stocklasa; 90+3' (0:4) Kébé	Attendance: 3,000; Referee: Kyros Vassaras (Greece)
Note: Head-coach Ponte on the stands due to a UEFA suspension. Assistant Schönenberger on the bench; 77th minute: Busuttil hits the post.

26 August 1999 Second leg	Zürich (Switzerland)	1–0	(Malta) Sliema Wanderers	Letzigrund, Zürich
19:30	Fischer (yellow card) 21' (yellow-red card) 84'; Chassot (yellow card) 45'; Quentin (yellow card) 51'; Douglas 69' (1:0)	UEFA report FCZ summary	(yellow card) 16' (yellow-red card) 90+3' Dimech; (yellow card) 20' Bonnici; (yellow card) 34' Policano; (yellow card) 52' Busuttil; (yellow card) 68' Antić; (yellow card) 85' Bergodi	Attendance: 7,000; Referee: Luan Zylfo (Albania)
Note: 19th minute, a shot from Bartlett hit the crossbar; 30th minute, Frick leaves the pitch injured, 85th minute, Stocklasa also leaves the game due to an injury.

Zürich won 4–0 on aggregate.

==== First round ====
16 September 1999 First leg	Zürich (Switzerland)	1–0	(Belgium) Lierse	Letzigrund, Zürich
20:00	Frick (yellow card) 27'; Jamarauli 29' (1:0); Jamarauli (yellow card) 85'	UEFA report FCZ summary		Attendance: 4,200; Referee: Michael McCurry (Scotland)

30 September 1999 Second leg	Lierse (Belgium)	3–4	(Switzerland) Zürich	Het Lisp, Lier
20:00	Van Meir 16' (1:1); Hoefkens (yellow card) 41'; Huysegems 72' (2:2); Zdebel 83' (3:2)	UEFA report FCZ summary	2' (0:1) Jamarauli; (yellow card) 23' Pascolo; (yellow card) 23' Giannini; (yellow card) 36' Stocklasa; (yellow card) 43' Quentin; 57' (1:2) Frick; (yellow card) 88' Frick; 88' (3:3) Eydelie; 90' (o.g.) Daems	Attendance: 4,936; Referee: Erol Ersoy (Turkey)

Zürich won 5–3 on aggregate.

==== Second round ====
21 October 1999 First leg	Zürich (Switzerland)	1–2	(England) Newcastle United	Letzigrund, Zürich
20:15	Kébé (yellow card) 27'; Castillo 68' (1:2)	UEFA report FCZ summary	51' (0:1) Marić; 60' (0:2) Shearer; (yellow card) 75' Harper	Attendance: 9,600; Referee: Jacek Granat (Poland)
Note: 86th minute, a shot from Bartlett hit the crossbar.

4 November 1999 Second leg	Newcastle United (England)	3–1	(Switzerland) Zürich	St James' Park, Newcastle
21:00	Marić 33' (1:1); Ferguson 58' (2:1); Speed 61' (3:1)	UEFA report FCZ summary	17' (0:1) Jamarauli; (yellow card) 19' Stocklasa; (yellow card) 90' Pascolo	Attendance: 34,502; Referee: Domenico Messina (Italy)
Note: 33rd minute: a shot from Shearer hit the crossbar. 84th minute: Kavelashvili left the pitch injured, leaving FCZ with only 10 men until the end of play.

Newcastle United won 5–2 on aggregate.

=== Friendly matches ===
==== Pre-season ====
20 June 1999 Exhibition game	Zürcher-Unterland Selection	0–4	Zürich	Dielsdorf
		FCZ summary	(0:1) Bartlett (0:2) Bartlett (0:3) Jamarauli (0:4) Frick
Note: Selection of 2.Liga amateur footballers.

22 June 1999 Exhibition game	Zürich	1–0	Grazer AK	Lindenberg im Allgäu
	Frick 75' (1:0)	FCZ summary		Attendance: 1,000
Note: Test players Thierry Ebe und Mamadou Thioud.

26 June 1999 Exhibition game	Delémont	0–2	Zürich	La Blancherie, Delémont
		FCZ summary	(0:1) Jamarauli (0:2) Jamarauli

30 June 1999 Exhibition game	Zürich	1–1 (3–4 p)	Aarau	Sportanlagen Trinermatten, Zofingen
	Bartlett 33' (1:1)	FCZ summary	21' (0:1) Ivanov	Attendance: 1,000; Referee: (Switzerland) René Rogalla (Wallisellen)
	Penalties
	Fischer (penalty scored); Frick (penalty missed); Castillo (penalty scored); Jamarauli (penalty scored); Bartlett (penalty missed)		(penalty scored) Skrzypczak; (penalty scored) Wiederkehr; (penalty scored) La Placa; (penalty scored) Page
Note: Match in a blitz tournament: semi-final, played in 45 minutes,

30 June 1999 Exhibition game	Zürich	1–0	Young Boys	Sportanlagen Trinermatten, Zofingen
	Bartlett 38' (1:0)	FCZ summary		Attendance: 1,000; Referee: (Switzerland) René Rogalla (Wallisellen)
Note: Blitz tournament match: Third-place play-off, played in 45 minutes,

27 July 1999 Mid-season; Exhibition game	Zürich	1–2	Luzern	Stadion Kleinfeld, Kriens
	(yellow card); Mijadinoski 54' (1:2)	FCZ summary	(yellow card) 6' Scepanovic; (yellow card) 13' Lipawsky; 14' (0:1) El Bouzidi; 29' (0:2) Scepanovic; (yellow card) 75' (yellow-red card) 87' Hodžić	Attendance: 3,100; Referee: (Switzerland) René Rogalla (Wallisellen)
Note: SRS Cup semi-final.

27 July 1999 Mid-season; Exhibition game	FC Bayern Munich	2–0	Zürich	Stadion Kleinfeld, Kriens
	Paulo Sérgio 48' (1:0); Fink 57' (2:0)	FCZ summary		Attendance: 3,800; Referee: (Switzerland) Carlo Bertolini (Vira-Gambarogno)
Note: SRS Cup third-place play-off.

==== Winter break ====
5 February 2000 Exhibition game	Zürich	1–0	Delémont	Hardhof, Zürich
	Akalé 48' (1:0)	FCZ summary		Attendance: 50

6 February 2000 Exhibition game	Zürich	1–1	Kriens	Sportzentrum Heerenschürli, Schwamendingen
	Douglas 37' (1:0)	FCZ summary	(1:1)	Attendance: 60

26 February 2000 Exhibition game	Zürich	3–1	Luzern	Letzigrund, Zürich
	Chassot 68' (1:1); Chassot 75' (2:1); Đorđević 90+2' (3:1)	FCZ summary	24' (0:1) Hodžić	Attendance: 200; Referee: (Switzerland) Reto Rutz (Amriswil)
Note: Hodzic on trial at Luzern (not signed).

29 March 2000 Mid-season; Exhibition game	Liechtenstein	2–1	Zürich	Rheinpark Stadion, Vaduz
	Stocklasa 8' (1:0); Telser 21' (2:0); Ritter (yellow card) 67'	FCZ summary	(yellow card) 43' Đorđević; 83' (2:1) Jashari	Attendance: 600; Referee: (Switzerland) Reto Rutz (Amriswil)

== Sources ==
- dbFCZ Homepage
- Switzerland 1999–2000 at RSSSF

Preceded by 1998–99	FC Zürich seasons	Succeeded by 2000–01
