= 1999–2000 Swiss Cup =

Tournament details
- Country: Switzerland
- Teams: 192

Final positions
- Champions: FC Zürich
- Runners-up: FC Lausanne-Sport

Tournament statistics
- Matches played: 191

The 1999–2000 Swiss Cup was the 75th season of Switzerland's annual football cup competition. It began on 7 August with the first games of Round 1 and ended on 28 May 2000 with the Final held at Wankdorf, Bern. The winners earned a place in the first round of the UEFA Cup.

== Overview ==
This years cup competition began on the week-end 6, 7–8 August with the first round. The competition ended on Sunday 28 May 2000 with the final held at the former Wankdorf Stadium in Bern. This year saw some modifications in the early rounds. The 54 clubs from the 1999–2000 1. Liga were granted byes for the first round and were to join the competition in the second round. The 12 clubs from the Nationalliga B were granted byes for the first three rounds. The 12 clubs from the Nationalliga A were granted byes for the first four rounds. The winners of the cup qualified themselves for the first round of the first round of the UEFA Cup in the following season.

When possible, the draw respected regionalities and the lower classed team was granted home advantage. In the entire competition, the matches were played in a single knockout format. In the event of a draw after 90 minutes, the match went into extra time. In the event of a draw at the end of extra time, a penalty shoot-out was to decide which team qualified for the next round. No replays were foreseen in the entire competition.

== Round 1 ==
In the first round a total of 114 amateur clubs participated from the fourth-tier and lower. Reserve teams were not admitted to the competition. The draw respected regionalities, when possible, and the lower classed team was granted home advantage.

Team 1	Score	Team 2
6 August 1999
FC Onex	5–2 (a.e.t.)	Association des Portugais GE
FC Riddes	0–6	US Collombey-Muraz
7 August 1999
FC Seefeld Zürich	7–0	FC Spreitenbach
ES Malley	2–1	US Terre Sainte
Gland	1–4	Collex-Bossy
Lengnau	1–3	FC Aarberg
FC Nottwil	0–3	Ibach
FC Richterswil	4–3	FC Bonaduz
FC Marin-Sports	1–2	FC Valmont
Baulmes	4–0	FC Lamboing
FC Egerkingen	0–8	Dornach
Laufen	5–5 (a.e.t.) (5–8 p)	FC Liestal
FC Pfäffikon	9–1	FC Appenzell
FC Fortuna (SG)	2–0	Bazenheid
FC Kirchberg	1–4 (a.e.t.)	FC Regensdorf
FC Oberwinterthur	0–1	FC Töss (Winterthur)
Old Boys	5–0	FC Alle
FC Olten	9–0	FC Klus-Balsthal
FC Suhr	5–2 (a.e.t.)	FC Sarnen
FC Turgi	2–1	Brugg
Goldau	1–2 (a.e.t.)	AS Lamone-Cadempino
FC Raron	0–1	FC Visp
FC Prishtina Bern	1–6	Belfaux
FC Vernayaz	1–3	FC Sierre
Düdingen	5–0	FC Interlaken
FC Attalens	6–2	FC Dardania Lausanne
CS Romontois	5–4	FC Espagnol LS
US Boncourt	1-4	Nordstern Basel
FC Cornol	0–3	FC Deitingen
FC Perlen-Buchrain	1–7	Kickers Luzern
AC Poschiavo	1–8	FC Bodio
FC Morbio	0–1	Mendrisio
8 August 1999
FC Geneva	4–0	FC Vernier
FC Wallisellen	0–4	FC Glarus
Breitenrain	0–2	FC Plaffeien
FC Konolfingen	3–4 (a.e.t.)	Dürrenast
FC Wiedikon ZH	0–5	Wohlen
FC Unterstrass	1–3	FC Polizei Zürich
Höngg	2–3 (a.e.t.)	Wettingen
FC Willisau	0–0 (a.e.t.) (4–3 p)	SC Emmen
FC Othmarsingen	2–4	FC Schwamendingen
ESC Erstfeld	2–2 (a.e.t.) (5–7 p)	AC Basso Malcantone
FC Vignoble	3–3 (a.e.t.) (6–7 p)	FC Crissier
ASI Audax-Friul	1–5	FC La Sarraz-Eclépens
FC Hinwil	3–1	FC Wädenswil
FC Weinfelden-Bürglen	2–2 (a.e.t.) (5–7 p)	VFC Neuhausen 90
FC Ins	0–3	FC Saint-Imier
FC Kirchberg	3–1	SC Worb
FC Arlesheim	2–1 (a.e.t.)	Moutier
FC Stans	2-0	SC Reiden
Chur	3–0	FC Wald
FC Weesen	0–1	FC Urdorf
FC Sargans	3–1	FC Schmerikon
FC Abtwil-Engelburg	2–1	Brühl
FC Rüti	3–2 (a.e.t.)	FC St. Margrethen
FC Kestenholz	1–2	Binningen
SV Würenlos	4–0	FC Albisrieden

== Round 2 ==
The 54 teams from the 1999–2000 1. Liga, that had been granted byes for the first round, joined the competition in this the second round. They were seeded and cound not be drawn against each other. The draw respected regionalities, when possible, and the lower classed team was granted the home advantage.

Team 1	Score	Team 2
20 August 1999
FC Richterswil	0–11	Tuggen
FC Valmont	1–4	Echallens
CS Romontois	3–4 (a.e.t.)	Bex
21 August 1999
FC Seefeld Zürich	0–2	FC Altstetten (Zürich)
FC Töss (Winterthur)	1–5	Kreuzlingen
ES Malley	3–7 (a.e.t.)	Chênois
FC Collex-Bossy	1–2	FC Signal
US Collombey-Muraz	4–1	Montreux-Sports
Belfaux	1–2 (a.e.t.)	Fribourg
FC Urdorf	1–3	FC Wetzikon
FC Abtwil-Engelburg	1–1 (a.e.t.) (5–6 p)	SC Veltheim (Winterthur)
Mendrisio	4–0	FC Ascona
FC La Sarraz-Eclépens	1–4	Stade Lausanne
FC Olten	0–3	Münsingen
FC Pfäffikon	2–4	Freienbach
VFC Neuhausen 90	0–10	FC Widnau
FC Kirchberg	2–2 (a.e.t.) (6–7 p)	SV Lyss
Old Boys	0–2	Grenchen
Nordstern Basel	4–6 (a.e.t.)	FC Riehen
FC Suhr	1–3	Schötz
SV Würenlos	3–1	SV Schaffhausen
FC Turgi	0–2	Wohlen
FC Glarus	3–1	FC Rorschach
FC Sierre	5–5 (a.e.t.) (3–2 p)	Naters
Binningen	1–4	Concordia Basel
FC Liestal	3–1	Colombier
Dornach	1–1 (a.e.t.) (5–2 p)	Muttenz
Wettingen	1–3 (a.e.t.)	YF Juventus
FC Onex	0–1	Meyrin
AC Basso Malcantone	0–2	Locarno
FC Attalens	2–1 (a.e.t.)	FC Bramois
22 August 1999
FC Geneva	0–3	Grand-Lancy
Baulmes	1–4	FC Renens
FC Polizei Zürich	2–4	FC Muri
FC Plaffeien	1–5	Bulle
FC Regensdorf	0–5	Red Star
FC Stans	1–3	Wangen bei Olten
FC Aarberg	2–0	Köniz
FC Schwamendingen	0–0 (a.e.t.) (4–5 p)	Frauenfeld
FC Visp	2–1	Monthey
Düdingen	1–3	Vevey-Sports
Dürrenast	3–2	Bümpliz
FC Deitingen	0–8	Biel-Bienne
FC Willisau	4–0	FC Sursee
FC Sargans	0–8	Zug 94
Ibach	1–1 (a.e.t.) (3–5 p)	Chiasso
FC Saint-Imier	1–3 (a.e.t.)	La Chaux-de-Fonds
FC Hinwil	0–2	FC Horgen
FC Fortuna (SG)	0–2	Gossau
FC Arlesheim	0–7	Serrières
FC Rüti	0–1	Rapperswil-Jona
AS Lamone-Cadempino	1–2	Biaschesi
FC Bodio	1–4	Malcantone Agno
Chur	1–0	FC Küssnacht am Rigi

== Round 3 ==
Team 1	Score	Team 2
4 September 1999
La Chaux-de-Fonds	0–1	Fribourg
Schötz	3–1	Concordia Basel
SC Veltheim (Winterthur)	0–1	Freienbach
Zug 94	2–1	Gossau
FC Renens	0–0 (a.e.t.) (5–4 p)	Bex
Grand-Lancy	0–3	Chênois
Stade Lausanne	2–0	Vevey Sports
US Collombey-Muraz	5–0	FC Visp
Bulle	0–6	Serrières
FC Kirchberg	2–8	Grenchen
Wangen bei Olten	0–1	Mendrisio
FC Wetzikon	3–2	FC Glarus
Chur	0–1	FC Horgen
Dornach	2–0	FC Riehen
SV Würenlos	1–3 (a.e.t.)	Tuggen
Signal FC (Bernex)	0–6	Meyrin
FC Attalens	0–6	Echallens
FC Sierre	1–1 (a.e.t.) (1–4 p)	Martigny-Sports
5 September 1999
Dürrenast	0–5	Münsingen
FC Aarberg	0–4	Biel-Bienne
FC Willisau	1–4 (a.e.t.)	Buochs
FC Liestal	1–6	Malcantone Agno
YF Juventus	2–1	Wohlen
FC Muri	0–2 (a.e.t.)	Chiasso
FC Widnau	1–3	Rapperswil-Jona
Frauenfeld	2–0	Kreuzlingen
Biaschesi	1–2 (a.e.t.)	Locarno
14 September 1999
Red Star	2–3	FC Altstetten (Zürich)

== Round 4 ==
The teams from the 1999–2000 Nationalliga B (NLB) were granted byes for the first three rounds and they joined the competition in the fourth round. These 12 teams were seeded and cound not be drawn against each other. The draw respected regionalities, when possible, and the lower classed team was granted home advantage.

=== Summary ===
Team 1	Score	Team 2
23 September 1999
Biel-Bienne	0–0 (a.e.t.) (4–5 p)	Serrières
24 September 1999
Fribourg	2–1	Stade Nyonnais
25 September 1999
Echallens	2–4 (a.e.t.)	Solothurn
Tuggen	1–2	Baden
FC Altstetten (Zürich)	3–1	Kriens
FC Renens	0–6	Young Boys
Mendrisio	3–2	Buochs
US Collombey-Muraz	3–10	Thun
Dornach	0–1	Winterthur
Grenchen	1–0 (a.e.t.)	Meyrin
Stade Lausanne	0–4	Étoile-Carouge
Chiasso	1–1 (a.e.t.) (4–5 p)	Schötz
Chênois	2–3	Sion
26 September 1999
Malcantone Agno	2–0	FC Schaffhausen
Freienbach	3–0	Frauenfeld
FC Wetzikon	2–3	Bellinzona
Rapperswil-Jona	3–5 (a.e.t.)	YF Juventus
Zug 94	2–4	Wil
Martigny-Sports	2–1	Münsingen
14 November 1999
Locarno	2–3	FC Horgen

=== Matches ===
25 September 1999

FC Renens	0–6	Young Boys
	YB summary	13' (0:1) Merenda; 18' (0:2) Sawu; 30' (0:3) Fryand; 57' (0:4) Merenda; (yellow card) 80' Mitreski; 82' (0:5) Sawu; 90+1' (0:6) Sawu

Zone sportive du Censuy, Renens
Attendance: 322
Referee: (Switzerland) Gelsomino

25 September 1999

Dornach	0–1	Winterthur
	RSSSF summary	84' (0:1) Ramsauer

Gigersloch, Dornach

== Round 5 ==
The 12 first-tier clubs from the 1999–2000 Nationalliga A had been granted byes for the first four rounds and they joined the competition in this round. The first-tier teams were seeded and cound not be drawn against each other. The draw respected regionalities, when possible, and the lower classed team was granted home advantage.

=== Summary ===
Team 1	Score	Team 2
13 November 1999
Mendrisio	1–5	Basel
FC Altstetten (Zürich)	0–2	Lugano
Serrières	1–2	Thun
Grenchen	0–4	Lausanne-Sport
Étoile-Carouge	3–0	Delémont
14 November 1999
Fribourg	2–1	Young Boys
Solothurn	2–3	Xamax
Chiasso	1–4	St. Gallen
Wil	1–2	Zürich
Freienbach	1–2	Grasshopper Club
Baden	0–3	Luzern
Malcantone Agno	1–3	Bellinzona
Winterthur	1–3	Aarau
Martigny-Sports	1–4	Servette
Sion	4–2	Yverdon-Sport
5 December 1999
FC Horgen	1–0	YF Juventus

=== Matches ===
13 November 1999
15:30

Mendrisio	1–5	Basel
Di Muro 69' (1:3)	Summary	25' (0:1) Koumantarakis; 27' (0:2) Tschopp; (yellow card) 43' Huggel; 55' (0:3) Koumantarakis; 75' (1:4) Koumantarakis; 83' (1:5) Güner

Centro Sportivo Comunale, Mendrisio
Attendance: 1,200
Referee: (Liechtenstein) Roland Beck (Triesenberg)

14 November 1999

Fribourg	2–1	Young Boys
Parfait 26' (1:0); Descloux 42' (2:1)	YB summary	41' (1:1) Reimann

Stade Universitaire, Fribourg
Attendance: 2,000
Referee: (Switzerland) Valerio Figaroli

14 November 1999

Wil	1–2	Zürich
Šlekys (yellow card) 75'; Vifian 90+4' (1:2)	FCZ summary	(yellow card) 31' Chassot; 51' (0:2) Frick; (yellow card) 54' Kébé; (yellow card) 78' Andreoli; 82' (0:2) Jamarauli

Stadion Bergholz, Wil
Attendance: 2,750
Referee: (Switzerland) Claude Detruche, (Thônex)

14 November 1999

Freienbach	1–2	Grasshopper Club
Langer 24' (1:0)	RSSSF summary	28' (1:1) de Napoli; 70' (1:2) H. Yakin

Chrummen, Freienbach

14 November 1999

Winterthur	1–3	Aarau
Firat 43' (1:2)	FCA summary	20' (0:1) Skrzypczak; 41' (0:2) Ivanov; 90+1' (1:3) Skrzypczak

Schützenwiese, Winterthur
Attendance: 1,640
Referee: (Switzerland) Mouidi

14 November 1999

Martigny-Sports	1–4	Servette
(Jeanneret) 16' (o.g.)	Servette summary	8' (0:1) Rey; 78' (1:2) Vurens; 82' (1:3) Wolf; 90' (1:4) Lonfat

Stade d'Octodure, Martigny

== Round 6 ==
=== Summary ===
Team 1	Score	Team 2
4 March 2000
FC Horgen	1–2	Luzern
Étoile-Carouge	0–1	Zürich
Bellinzona	0–4	Lausanne-Sport
Sion	1–3 (a.e.t.)	St. Gallen
Xamax	0–4	Lugano
Basel	1–1 (a.e.t.) (5–4 p)	Grasshopper Club
5 March 2000
Fribourg	0–3	Thun
Aarau	1–3	Servette

=== Matches ===
4 March 2000

Étoile-Carouge	0–1	Zürich
Ebe (yellow card) 62'	FCZ summary	58' (0:1) Chassot; (yellow card) 64' Tsawa; (yellow card) 67' Del Signore

Stade de la Fontenette, Carouge
Attendance: 990
Referee: (Switzerland) Markus Nobs (Wohlen bei Bern)

4 March 2000
20:15

Basel	1–1 (a.e.t.)	Grasshopper Club
Kreuzer 37' (pen. 1:0); Koumantarakis (yellow card) 85'; Cravero (yellow card) 98'	FCB summary	(yellow card) 25' H. Yakin; (yellow card) 30' Haas; 65' (1:1) Müller; (yellow card) 66' Chapuisat
Penalties
M. Yakin (penalty scored); Tholot (penalty scored); Kreuzer (penalty scored); Koumantarakis (penalty scored); Huggel (penalty scored)	5–4	(penalty scored) Chapuisat; (penalty missed) Müller; (penalty scored) Cabanas; (penalty scored) Tikva; (penalty scored) Hodel

Stadion Schützenmatte, Basel
Attendance: 6,500
Referee: (Switzerland) Urs Meier (Würenlos)

5 March 2000

Aarau	1–3	Servette
Ivanov 14' (pen.)	FCA summary Servette summary	43' (1:1) Melunovic; 70' (1:2) Pizzinat; 82' (1:3) Thurre

Stadion Brügglifeld, Aarau
Attendance: 3,000
Referee: (Switzerland) Guido Wildhaber (Kerzers)

== Quarter-finals ==
=== Summary ===
Team 1	Score	Team 2
11 April 2000
Thun	1–2 (a.e.t.)	Zürich
Lugano	1–0	St. Gallen
12 April 2000
Luzern	3–2	Servette
Lausanne-Sport	3–2	Basel

=== Matches ===
11 April 2000

Thun	1–2 (a.e.t.)	Zürich
Okpala 55' (1:1)	FCZ summary	1' (0:1) Tsawa; (yellow card) 72' Giannini; (yellow card) 78' Quentin; 117' (1:2) Ndlovu

Stadion Lachen, Thun
Attendance: 2,376
Referee: (Switzerland) Massimo Busacca (Monte Carasso, Ticino)

11 April 2000

Lugano	1–0	St. Gallen
Gimenez 41' (1:0)	RSSSF summary

Cornaredo, Lugano

12 April 2000

Luzern	3–2	Servette
Branca 30' (1:0); Frei 53' (2:0); Joller 57' (3:0)	Servette summary	78' (3:1) Rey; 90+4' (3:2) Wolf

Stadion Allmend, Luzern

12 April 2000
19:30

Lausanne-Sport	3–2	Basel
Magnin (yellow card) 18'; Kuźba 32' (1:0); Gerber 34' (2:0); Kuźba (yellow card) 78'; Gerber 88' (3:2)	FCB summary	50' (2:1) Koumantarakis; (yellow card) 72' M. Yakin; 71' (2:2) N'Tiamoah

Olympique de la Pontaise, Lausanne
Attendance: 2,600
Referee: (Switzerland) Dieter Schoch (Attiswil)

== Semi-finals ==
=== Summary ===
Team 1	Score	Team 2
4 May 2000
Zürich	7–2 (a.e.t.)	Luzern
11 May 2000
Lausanne-Sport	3–2	Lugano

=== Matches ===
4 May 2000
20:15

Zürich	7–2 (a.e.t.)	Luzern
Bartlett 18', 79', 94'; Frick 98'; Del Signore 107' (pen.); Jamarauli 113'; Chassot 116'	FCZ summary RSSSF summary	7' Frei; 78' (red card) 117' Gian; (yellow card) 78' Branca

Letzigrund, Zürich
Attendance: 7,300
Referee: (Switzerland) Markus Nobs (Wohlen)

11 May 2000
20:15

Lausanne-Sport	3–2	Lugano
Kuźba 8', 20', 60'	RSSSF summary	79' Gaspoz; 81' Rothenbühler

Olympique de la Pontaise, Lausanne
Attendance: 5,000
Referee: (Switzerland) Marcel Vollenweider (Rüti, Zürich)

== Final ==
The winners of the first drawn semi-final was considered as home team in the final.

=== Summary ===
Team 1	Score	Team 2
28 May 2000
Zürich	2–2 (a.e.t.) (3–0 p)	Lausanne-Sport

=== Telegram ===
28 May 2000
15:00

Zürich	2–2 (a.e.t.)	Lausanne-Sport
Quentin (yellow card) 39'; Tsawa (yellow card) 45'; Del Signore (yellow card) 57'; Frick (yellow card) 60'; Jamarauli 77'; Đorđević (yellow card) 91'; Bartlett 95'; Fischer (yellow card) 111'; Bartlett (yellow card) 95' (yellow-red card) 112'	Fussball-Schweiz summary FCZ summary	35' Danilevičius; (yellow card) 85' Hänzi; 105' Gerber; (yellow card) 120+2' Horjak
Penalties
Fischer (penalty scored); Douglas (penalty scored); Kavelashvili (penalty scored)	3–0	(penalty missed) Ohrel; (penalty missed) Londono; (penalty missed) Christ

Wankdorf, Bern
Attendance: 18,500
Referee: (Switzerland) Carlo Bertolini (Vira)

Zürich won the cup and this was the club's sixth cup title to this date.

== Further in Swiss football ==
- 1999–2000 Nationalliga A
- 1999–2000 Nationalliga B
- 1999–2000 Swiss 1. Liga

Preceded by 1998–99	Seasons in Swiss Cup	Succeeded by 2000–01

== Sources and references ==
- Official site (in German)
- Switzerland 1999/00 at RSSSF
