= Marco Pascolo =

Swiss footballer (born 1966)

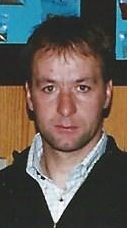
- Marco Pascolo

Personal information
- Date of birth: 9 May 1966 (age 60)
- Place of birth: Sion, Switzerland
- Height: 1.88 m (6 ft 2 in)
- Position: Goalkeeper

Senior career*
Years	Team	Apps	(Gls)
1986–1989	Sion	17	(1)
1989–1991	Neuchâtel Xamax	52	(0)
1991–1996	Servette	176	(0)
1996–1997	Cagliari	14	(0)
1997–1998	Nottingham Forest	5	(0)
1998–2002	Zürich	115	(0)
2002–2003	Servette	27	(0)
Total		406	(1)

International career
1992–2001	Switzerland	55	(0)
- * Club domestic league appearances and goals

Marco Pascolo (Italian pronunciation: [ˈmarko ˈpaskolo]; born 9 May 1966) is a Swiss former professional footballer who played as a goalkeeper. He spent his best playing days at Servette FC and FC Zürich in the 1990s and early 2000s (decade). Between 1992 and 2001, he made 55 appearances for the Switzerland national team. He is currently goalkeeping coach for FC Sion.

== Career ==
Born in Sion, Pascolo started playing football professionally in 1986, with local club FC Sion. At Sion, he failed to break into the first-team and left for Neuchâtel Xamax in 1989. During his first season at Xamax, he was used in a squad rotation system, only playing once every few weeks, but in his second season he hit top form and claimed the Number 1 jersey for himself. He signed for Servette FC in 1991 and became a fan favourite almost immediately. Shortly after signing for Servette, he earned a call-up to the Swiss national team. After achieving all he could at Servette, he went to Serie A with Cagliari Calcio in 1996, but found first-team action hard to come by. And after just one season in Italy, he left for England's Nottingham Forrest. He played even fewer games there and returned to Switzerland in 1998 with FC Zürich. He was a first-team regular in Zürich for four seasons before he returned to Servette in 2002 to finish his career.

He was capped 55 times for the Swiss national team between 1992 and 2001. He was in the Swiss squad at the 1994 FIFA World Cup, playing all four games, and also at Euro 1996.

He is now a goalkeeping coach at FC Sion.

== Career statistics ==
Appearances and goals by club, season and competition
Club	Season			
Club	Season	Division	Apps	Goals
Sion	1986–87	Nationalliga A	1	0
Sion	1987–88	Nationalliga A	13	0
Sion	1988–89	Nationalliga A	3	1
Sion	Total		17	1
Neuchatel Xamax	1989–90	Nationalliga A	18	0
Neuchatel Xamax	1990–91	Nationalliga A	34	0
Neuchatel Xamax	Total		52	0
Servette	1991–92	Nationalliga A	35	0
Servette	1992–93	Nationalliga A	36	0
Servette	1993–94	Nationalliga A	35	0
Servette	1994–95	Nationalliga A	35	0
Servette	1995–96	Nationalliga A	35	0
Servette	Total		176	0
Cagliari Calcio	1996–97	Serie A	14	0
Nottingham Forest	1997–98	Football League First Division	5	0
FC Zürich	1998–99	Nationalliga A	12	0
FC Zürich	1999–00	Nationalliga A	34	0
FC Zürich	2000–01	Nationalliga A	34	0
FC Zürich	2001–02	Nationalliga A	35	0
FC Zürich	Total		115	0
Servette	2002–03	Nationalliga A	27	0
Career total			406	1

== Honours ==
Neuchâtel Xamax

- Swiss Super Cup: 1990

FC Zürich

- Swiss Cup: 1999–2000
