= ES Belfaux =

- Founded: 1948
- Chairman: François Bovigny (president)
- Coach: Lezzi Salvatore

ES Belfaux are a football team from Switzerland who currently play in the 2ème league 2019–2020.

== Current squad ==
Note: Flags indicate national team as defined under FIFA eligibility rules; some limited exceptions apply. Players may hold more than one non-FIFA nationality.

| No. | Pos. | Nation | Player |
|---|---|---|---|
| — | | (Switzerland) SUI | Philippe Roschy |
| — | | (Switzerland) SUI | Carlos Hernandez |
| — | | (Switzerland) SUI | Pascal Baechler |
| — | | (Switzerland) SUI | Patrick Francey |
| — | | (Switzerland) SUI | Carlos Hernandez |
| — | | (Switzerland) SUI | Benoît Descloux |
| — | | (Switzerland) SUI | Jacques Descloux |
| — | | (Switzerland) SUI | Nicolas Sansonnens |
| — | | (Switzerland) SUI | André Dombele |
| — | | (Switzerland) SUI | Patrick Sudan |
| — | | (Switzerland) SUI | Jean-Christophe Naudeix |

| No. | Pos. | Nation | Player |
|---|---|---|---|
| — | | (Switzerland) SUI | Sylvain Erard |
| — | | (Switzerland) SUI | Blaise Allemann |
| — | | (Switzerland) SUI | Pedro Fernandes |
| — | | (Switzerland) SUI | Matteo Radaelli |
| — | | (Switzerland) SUI | Aurélien Blanchard |
| — | | (Switzerland) SUI | Lionel Gendre |
| — | | (Switzerland) SUI | Mikael Freiburghaus |
| — | | (Switzerland) SUI | Ermal Uka |
| — | | (Switzerland) SUI | Hervé Gibeyo |
| — | | (Switzerland) SUI | Ronald Makangilu |

== Staff and board members ==
- Trainer: Jacques Descloux
- Assistant trainer: Patrick Sudan
