= Wilfried Delbroek =

Belgian footballer

Personal information
- Date of birth: 25 August 1972 (age 54)
- Place of birth: Maaseik, Belgium
- Height: 1.85 m (6 ft 1 in)
- Position: Defender

Senior career*
Years	Team	Apps	(Gls)
1995–2002	Genk.		
2002–2004	K. Beringen-Heusden-Zolder		
2004–2006	K.S.K. Tongeren		
2006–2007	Cobox 76		

International career
1999	Belgium	5	(0)
- * Club domestic league appearances and goals

Wilfried Delbroek (born 25 August 1972) is a Belgian former professional footballer who played as a defender. He made five appearances for the Belgium national team in 1999.

== Honours ==
Genk

- Belgian First Division: 1998–99, 2001–02
- Belgian Cup: 1997–98, 1999–2000
