= David Paas =

Belgian footballer

Personal information
- Full name: David Jan Paas
- Date of birth: 24 February 1971 (age 55)
- Place of birth: Tongeren, Belgium
- Height: 1.85 m (6 ft 1 in)
- Position: Striker

Youth career
- –1989: Tongeren

Senior career*
Years	Team	Apps	(Gls)
1989–1995	Tongeren	138	(39)
1995–1997	Eendracht Aalst	40	(15)
1997–1998	Vitória Guimarães	35	(4)
1998–2000	Harelbeke	45	(23)
2000–2002	Genk	30	(7)
2002–2005	Westerlo	77	(18)
- * Club domestic league appearances and goals

David Jan Paas (born 24 February 1971) is a retired Belgian former professional footballer who played as a striker.

During his career, Paas played for Tongeren, Eendracht Aalst, Vitória Guimarães Harelbeke, Genk and Westerlo.
