= Christophe Jaquet =

Swiss footballer (born 1976)

Personal information
- Full name: Christophe Jaquet
- Date of birth: 2 April 1976 (age 50)
- Height: 1.78 m (5 ft 10 in)
- Position: Defender

Team information
- Current team: Fribourg

Senior career*
Years	Team	Apps	(Gls)
1992–1993	Fribourg	1	(0)
1997–2000	Yverdon-Sport	96	(5)
2000–2004	Servette	107	(3)
2004–2006	Yverdon-Sport	67	(0)
2006–2008	Neuchâtel Xamax	19	(1)
2008–	Fribourg	0	(0)

International career
1999–2000	Switzerland	3	(0)
- * Club domestic league appearances and goals

Christophe Jaquet (born 2 April 1976) is a Swiss footballer who plays for Fribourg at 1. Liga.

He did not play any match in 2007–08 season, since followed Neuchâtel Xamax promoted back to Swiss Super League. He played 171 games in Swiss top-division.
