= Patrick Bühlmann =

Swiss footballer (born 1971)

Personal information
- Date of birth: 16 August 1971 (age 55)
- Height: 1.79 m (5 ft 10 in)
- Position: Midfielder

Senior career*
Years	Team	Apps	(Gls)
1990–1991	FC Luzern	0	(0)
1991–1993	FC Zug		
1993–1994	FC Luzern	11	(2)
1994–1995	FC Aarau	35	(2)
1995–1996	FC Sion	29	(2)
1996	→ FC St. Gallen	11	(1)
1997–1998	FC St. Gallen	47	(1)
1998–2000	Servette FC	56	(6)
2000	FC Lausanne-Sport	18	(2)
2000–2002	FC Zürich	48	(4)
2002–2003	SC Kriens	8	(0)
2003–2004	Zug 94		
2005–2006	SC Cham		
2007–2009	Zug 94	25	(3)

International career
1998–2001	Switzerland	17	(1)
- * Club domestic league appearances and goals

Patrick Bühlmann (born 16 August 1971) is a retired Swiss football midfielder.
