= Badile Lubamba =

Swiss footballer (born 1976)

Personal information
- Date of birth: 26 April 1976 (age 50)
- Place of birth: Kinshasa, Zaire
- Height: 1.74 m (5 ft 9 in)
- Position: Defender

Senior career*
Years	Team	Apps	(Gls)
1994–1995	FC Bulle		
1995–1996	Lausanne-Sport	2	(0)
1996–1997	FC Meyrin	19	(3)
1997–1998	SR Delémont	34	(1)
1998	Lausanne-Sport	1	(0)
1999–2000	FC Luzern	45	(0)
2000–2001	Lugano	32	(0)
2002–2003	Troyes	6	(0)
2003–2004	Vevey Sports		
2004–2005	Sion	21	(1)
2005–2006	Neuchâtel Xamax	12	(1)
2006–2008	AS Vita Club		
2008	FC La Tour/Le Pâquier	6	(0)

International career
2000	Switzerland	2	(0)
- * Club domestic league appearances and goals

Badile Lubamba (born 26 April 1976) is a former professional footballer who played as a defender. Born in Zaire, he made two appearances for the Switzerland national team.
