= David Pallas =

Swiss footballer (born 1980)

Personal information
- Full name: David Pallas
- Date of birth: 1 July 1980 (age 46)
- Place of birth: A Laracha, Galicia, Spain
- Height: 1.69 m (5 ft 7 in)
- Position: Right-back

Youth career
- 1993–1997: FC Zürich

Senior career*
| Years | Team | Apps | (Gls) |
| 1998–2004 | FC Zürich | 105 | (1) |
| 2004–2005 | → Thun (loan) | 10 | (1) |
| 2004–2005 | FC Zürich | 8 | (0) |
| 2005 | → Thun (loan) | 6 | (0) |
| 2005–2007 | VfL Bochum | 32 | (0) |
| 2007 | → VfL Bochum II | 1 | (0) |
| 2009–2012 | FC Langenthal | | |
| 2012–2014 | FC Oftringen | | |
| 2014–2015 | FC Ibach | | |
| Total | | 162 | (2) |
- * Club domestic league appearances and goals

David Pallas (born 1 July 1980) is a Swiss former footballer who played as a right-back. He last played for VfL Bochum in Germany's Bundesliga.

== Early life ==
Born in A Laracha, Spain, Pallas began his youth career at FC Zürich, where he made the leap into the first team in 2001. During the winter break of the 2004–05 season, Pallas moved to league rivals FC Thun 1898, who qualified for the Champions League at the end of that season. He then moved to VfL Bochum, where he was a replacement for the injured right-back Søren Colding. As a reason for his move to VfL Bochum Pallas said that he sees a better prospect at the Ruhr club as well as financial benefits. After his first few games for VfL Bochum he again had to settle for a place on the bench. He played 21 league games and was wearing the shirt number 36. Pallas had a contract until 2007 and a one-year option, which was not activated.

After leaving Bochum, Pallas remained uncontracted during the 2007–08 season, despite negotiations with Arsenal Kyiv, AEK Larnaca, RoPS and KV Kortrijk and attending training camps with Swiss clubs, and retired from professional football in summer 2008. He joined amateur Swiss club FC Langenthal in 2009. Pallas later became club captain, and eventually left the club in summer 2012. Following this Pallas has spells playing for FC Oftringen and FC Ibach before retiring as a player in 2015.

== Honours ==
FC Zürich

- Swiss Cup: 1999–2000
