= Jero Shakpoke =

Nigerian footballer

Personal information
- Date of birth: 5 December 1979 (age 46)
- Place of birth: Warri, Nigeria
- Position: Defender

Senior career*
Years	Team	Apps	(Gls)
1995	Port Harcourt	30	(0)
1995–1996	Reggiana	0	(0)
1996–1997	FK Vardar	16	(0)
1997	HNK Rijeka	0	(0)
1998	Zagłębie Lubin	9	(0)
1998–1999	Reggiana	21	(0)
1999	Bologna	0	(0)
1999–2000	Lugano	6	(1)
2000–2001	Nice	19	(1)
2001	Palermo	0	(0)
2002	Reggiana	15	(1)
2002–2003	Teramo	3	(0)
2005–2007	Rovigo	52	(8)
2007–2008	Varese	23	(0)
2008–2009	Rovigo	21	(0)
2009	Siena	0	(0)
2009–2010	→ Union SG (loan)	24	(0)
2010–2012	Union SG	43	(0)
Total		282	(11)

International career
1998–1999	Nigeria	6	(0)
- * Club domestic league appearances and goals

Jero Shakpoke (born 5 December 1979) is a Nigerian former professional footballer who played as a defender. Between 1998 and 1999, he made six appearances for the Nigeria national team.

== Career ==
Shakpoke was born in Warri, Nigeria.

He joined Tuscan Serie A side A.C. Siena in August 2009 from Rovigo Calcio on a two-year permanent deal. According to an interview released by Shakpoke himself, he will successively leave Siena to join an unnamed Belgian team within days; the team was later unveiled to be Royale Union Saint-Gilloise, headed by Italian Roberto Landi, on a season loan move.

== Personal life ==
Shakpoke's son, Ruben, is a striker.
