= Marco Kottmann =

Swiss footballer (born 1980)

Personal information
- Date of birth: 27 January 1980 (age 46)
- Place of birth: Switzerland
- Height: 1.81 m (5 ft 11 in)
- Position: Midfielder

Senior career*
Years	Team	Apps	(Gls)
1999–2003	FC Luzern	57	(12)
2003–2005	SC Kriens	60	(2)
2005–2007	FC Schötz	22	(7)
2007–2010	SC Cham		
- * Club domestic league appearances and goals

Marco Kottmann (born 27 January 1980) is a Swiss former professional footballer who played as a midfielder for FC Luzern, SC Kriens, FC Schötz, and SC Cham.
