= Saidou Kébé =

Senegalese footballer

Personal information
- Full name: Saidou Kébé
- Date of birth: August 16, 1976 (age 50)
- Place of birth: Dakar, Senegal
- Height: 1.85 m (6 ft 1 in)
- Position: Defender

Team information
- Current team: FC Moutier
- Number: 5

Senior career*
Years	Team	Apps	(Gls)
1997	Dakar UC		
1998	FC Locarno		
1998–1999	SR Delémont	31	(4)
1999–2000	FC Zürich	20	(0)
2001–2004	SR Delémont	90	(3)
2005–2009	La Chaux-de-Fonds	68	(2)
2009–	FC Moutier	0	(0)

International career
2001	Senegal		
- * Club domestic league appearances and goals as of 10:15, 20 January 2008 (UTC)

Saidou Kébé (born 16 August 1976 in Dakar) is a Senegalese footballer. He plays for La Chaux-de-Fonds.

Kébé has been played in Switzerland for almost ten years.

He joined La Chaux-de-Fonds in February 2005 after released by SR Delémont in summer 2004.
