= Yvan Quentin =

Swiss footballer (born 1970)

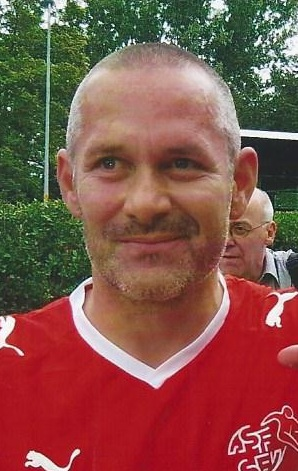

Personal information
- Date of birth: 2 May 1970 (age 56)
- Place of birth: Collombey-Muraz, Switzerland
- Height: 1.75 m (5 ft 9 in)
- Position: Defender

Senior career*
Years	Team	Apps	(Gls)
1990–1998	FC Sion	198	(5)
1998–1999	Neuchâtel Xamax	13	(0)
1999–2003	FC Zürich	121	(2)
2003–2004	FC Sion	0	(0)
Total		326	(7)

International career
1992–2002	Switzerland	41	(0)
- * Club domestic league appearances and goals

Yvan Quentin (born 2 May 1970) is a retired Swiss football defender.

He was capped 41 times for the Swiss national team between 1992 and 2002. He played four games at the 1994 FIFA World Cup, and was in the Euro 1996 squad.

He is the "nephew" of former Swiss international René-Pierre.

== Honours ==
=== Player ===
FC Sion

- Swiss Championship: 1991–92, 1996–97
- Swiss Cup: 1994–95, 1995–96, 1996–97

FC Zürich

- Swiss Cup: 1999–2000
