= Shaun Bartlett =

South African soccer player (born 1972)

Personal information
- Full name: Thurston Shaun Bartlett
- Date of birth: 31 October 1972 (age 54)
- Place of birth: Cape Town, South Africa
- Height: 1.85 m (6 ft 1 in)
- Position: Striker

Youth career
- Factreton
- Norway Parks
- Vasco da Gama

Senior career*
Years	Team	Apps	(Gls)
1992–1995	Cape Town Spurs	116	(48)
1996–1997	Colorado Rapids	36	(9)
1997	MetroStars	13	(2)
1997–1998	→ Cape Town Spurs (loan)	18	(8)
1998–2001	FC Zürich	77	(27)
2000–2001	→ Charlton Athletic (loan)	18	(7)
2001–2006	Charlton Athletic	105	(17)
2006–2008	Kaizer Chiefs	31	(11)
2008–2009	Bloemfontein Celtic	8	(0)
Total		422	(129)

International career
1995–2005	South Africa	74	(29)

Managerial career
- 2012–2016: Golden Arrows (assistant manager)
- 2016–2018: University of Pretoria
- 2018–2020: Kaizer Chiefs (assistant manager)
- 2021: TS Galaxy (assistant manager)
- 2021–2023: Cape Town Spurs (manager)
- * Club domestic league appearances and goals

Shaun Bartlett (born 31 October 1972) is a South African professional soccer manager and former player who was most recently the manager of Cape Town Spurs. During his playing career, he played as a striker.

== Early life ==
Born in Cape Town, Bartlett was raised by his grandmother in Factreton on the Cape Flats. He began playing for his church team and quickly developed a deft striking ability on the field. He was also a talented cricketer.

== Club career ==
Bartlett began his career with his hometown Cape Town Spurs and then moved to Major League Soccer and the Colorado Rapids in the league's inaugural season in 1996. Halfway through the 1997 season, he was traded to the MetroStars on 10 July. Bartlett left MLS, without leaving much of a mark and returned to his home country. He later went on loan to FC Zürich and then transferring there for good in 1998. He went on loan to Charlton Athletic in 2000, and moved there in 2001 on a permanent deal worth £2 million. Bartlett won the Premier League Goal of the Season award in 2000–01, for his volley against Leicester City. He was released by the club in May 2006.

Bartlett then returned to South Africa signing with Kaizer Chiefs and in the summer of 2008 retired from professional football. After several discussions, he then made a return to football with Bloemfontein Celtic.

== International career ==
Bartlett made his full international debut for the South Africa national team in a friendly against Lesotho on 26 April 1995.

He is the second all-time leading scorer behind Benni McCarthy for South Africa, with 29 goals in 74 appearances. He helped his country to the 1996 African Nations Cup and played in the 1998 FIFA World Cup, scoring two goals.

He was omitted from the squad for the 1997 FIFA Confederations Cup by coach Clive Barker amid disputes between Barker and the South African Football Association over player selection, and subsequently missed the 1998 African Cup of Nations due to injury. New coach Philippe Troussier recalled Bartlett in May 1998, naming him in the preliminary squad for the 1998 FIFA World Cup. He featured in the warm-up matches against Zambia and Argentina, scoring the equaliser against Zambia, before being included in the final squad on 23 May.

On 12 June, Bartlett made his World Cup debut when he came on as an 89th-minute substitute for Benni McCarthy in South Africa's 3–0 defeat to France. Six days later, he played 77 minutes in a 1–1 draw with Denmark and provided the assist for McCarthy's goal, South Africa's first ever goal at a FIFA World Cup. In the final group match against Saudi Arabia, Bartlett scored twice in a 2–2 draw, although South Africa finished third in their group and were eliminated from the tournament.

Bartlett subsequently experienced a dip in form, leading to doubts over his status as South Africa's first-choice striker. However, he returned to form at the 2000 African Cup of Nations, where he finished as the tournament's top scorer with five goals. He began the competition with two goals against Gabon before scoring against the Democratic Republic of the Congo and Algeria to help South Africa reach the quarter-finals. South Africa defeated Ghana in the quarter-finals despite playing the entire second half with ten men, before losing to Nigeria in the semi-finals. Bartlett scored his fifth and final goal of the tournament in the third-place play-off against Tunisia, which South Africa won 6–5 on penalties, despite him missing his attempt in the shoot-out. With his goal in the third-place play-off, Bartlett surpassed his strike partner Phil Masinga to become South Africa's all-time leading goalscorer.

He finished the tournament as its top scorer, although he was omitted from the Team of the Tournament, with Cameroon's Samuel Eto'o and Patrick Mboma selected as the two forwards instead. His five goals also made him South Africa's second-highest scorer in the history of the competition at the time, behind Benni McCarthy, who had scored seven goals at the previous edition.

Bartlett carried his Africa Cup of Nations form into South Africa's 2002 FIFA World Cup qualifying campaign, scoring in both legs of the preliminary-round tie against Lesotho as South Africa advanced 3–0 on aggregate to reach the group stage. His goalscoring form continued, and in June 2000 he scored against the Republic of Ireland in the US Cup to become the first South African player to reach 20 international goals. On 16 December 2000, Bartlett scored the opening goal in South Africa's 2–1 victory over Liberia in a 2002 African Cup of Nations qualifier, taking his tally for the year to nine goals and giving him the second-highest single-year total by a South African player at the time, behind the record of 11 goals set by his teammate Benni McCarthy exactly four years earlier.

Bartlett was handed the captaincy the following year as regular captain Lucas Radebe struggled with recurring injuries. He was again among South Africa's leading scorers during the 2002 FIFA World Cup qualifying campaign, scoring four goals in six appearances. By that stage, he had scored 23 goals in 61 appearances for the national team.

He subsequently took part in the 2002 African Cup of Nations in Mali. Bartlett started South Africa's opening match against Burkina Faso but suffered an injury during the game and missed the remainder of the group stage. After South Africa progressed to the knockout stages as winners of Group B, he returned for the quarter-final against Mali despite not having fully recovered. Although he was able to make a substitute appearance in the 2–0 defeat, the injury caused him to miss the remainder of the 2001–02 season and ultimately ruled him out of the 2002 FIFA World Cup.

Bartlett returned to the national side during the qualifying campaign for the 2004 African Cup of Nations. He made only two appearances during the qualifiers, both against Ivory Coast, and scored the opening goal in a 2–1 victory in the reverse fixture in June 2003. He announced his retirement from international football in October 2003 to focus on his club career with Charlton Athletic, but was persuaded by the South African Football Association to reverse his decision a few months later in March 2004 in order to help the national team qualify for the 2006 FIFA World Cup.

Following South Africa's failure to qualify for the tournament, Bartlett again announced his retirement from football. He made his final appearance on 7 September 2005, scoring in a 4–2 friendly defeat to Germany. The match marked his 74th appearance for the national team, allowing him to surpass John Moshoeu's record of 73 caps and become South Africa's most capped player at the time. His goal was his 29th for the national team, and he finished his international career holding the national records for both goals scored and appearances.

== Managerial career ==
Bartlett coached Golden Arrows to the National First Division title in the 2014/15 season. He went on to play a crucial role as Kaizer Chiefs assistant coach in turning around the club from a ninth-place finish in the 2018/19 season to topping the table for most of the following season. In October 2021, Bartlett was appointed as manager of National First Division side Cape Town Spurs. After leading them to promotion, Spurs parted ways with Bartlett after seven consecutive defeats at the start of the 2023–24 season.

== Personal life ==
Bartlett's wedding was attended by Nelson Mandela. To avoid excess attention, only he and his bride knew that the politician was coming. Bartlett's son, Tyrique is also a footballer.

== Career statistics ==
=== Club ===
Appearances and goals by club, season and competition
Club	Season	League			National cup		League cup		Continental		Other		Total	
Club	Season	Division	Apps	Goals	Apps	Goals	Apps	Goals	Apps	Goals	Apps	Goals	Apps	Goals
FC Zürich	1998–99	Nationalliga A	27	13	1	0	—		8	8	—		36	21
FC Zürich	1999–2000	Nationalliga A	30	6	4	4	—		6	1	—		40	11
FC Zürich	2000–01	Nationalliga A	20	8	0	0	—		2	1	—		22	9
FC Zürich	Total		77	27	5	4	—		16	10	—		98	41
Charlton Athletic	2000–01	Premier League	18	7	2	0	0	0	—		0	0	20	7
Charlton Athletic	2001–02	Premier League	14	1	1	0	2	0	—		0	0	17	1
Charlton Athletic	2002–03	Premier League	31	4	2	0	1	0	—		0	0	34	4
Charlton Athletic	2003–04	Premier League	19	5	0	0	0	0	—		0	0	19	5
Charlton Athletic	2004–05	Premier League	23	6	2	2	2	2	—		0	0	27	8
Charlton Athletic	2005–06	Premier League	16	1	5	0	1	0	—		0	0	22	1
Charlton Athletic	Total		121	24	12	2	6	2	—		0	0	139	26
Career Total			198	51	17	6	6	2	16	10	0	0	237	67

=== International ===
Scores and results list South Africa's goal tally first, score column indicates score after each Bartlett goal.

List of international goals scored by Shaun Bartlett
No.	Date	Venue	Opponent	Score	Result	Competition
1	24 November 1995	Mmabatho, South Africa	Egypt	2–0	2–0	Four Nations Cup
2	26 November 1995	Johannesburg, South Africa	Zimbabwe	1–0	2–0	Four Nations Cup
3	26 November 1995	Johannesburg, South Africa	Zimbabwe	2–0	2–0	Four Nations Cup
4	31 January 1996	Johannesburg, South Africa	Ghana	2–0	3–0	1996 African Nations Cup
5	15 June 1996	Johannesburg, South Africa	Malawi	1–0	3–0	1998 FIFA World Cup qualification
6	15 June 1996	Johannesburg, South Africa	Malawi	3–0	3–0	1998 FIFA World Cup qualification
7	11 October 1997	Lens, France	France	1–0	1–2	Friendly
8	20 May 1998	Johannesburg, South Africa	Zambia	1–1	1–1	Friendly
9	24 June 1998	Bordeaux, France	Saudi Arabia	1–0	2–2	1998 FIFA World Cup
10	24 June 1998	Bordeaux, France	Saudi Arabia	2–2	2–2	1998 FIFA World Cup
11	3 October 1998	Johannesburg, South Africa	Angola	1–0	1–0	2000 African Nations Cup qualification
12	27 February 1999	Mabopane, South Africa	Gabon	3–1	4–1	2000 African Nations Cup qualification
13	23 January 2000	Kumasi, Ghana	Gabon	2–1	3–1	2000 African Nations Cup
14	23 January 2000	Kumasi, Ghana	Gabon	3–1	3–1	2000 African Nations Cup
15	27 January 2000	Kumasi, Ghana	DR Congo	1–0	1–0	2000 African Nations Cup
16	2 February 2000	Kumasi, Ghana	Algeria	1–0	1–1	2000 African Nations Cup
17	12 February 2000	Accra, Ghana	Tunisia	1–0	2–2	2000 African Nations Cup
18	8 April 2000	Maseru, Lesotho	Lesotho	1–0	2–0	2002 FIFA World Cup qualification
19	23 April 2000	Bloemfontein, South Africa	Lesotho	1–0	1–0	2002 FIFA World Cup qualification
20	16 December 2000	Johannesburg, South Africa	Liberia	1–0	2–1	2002 African Nations Cup qualification
21	27 January 2001	Rustenburg, South Africa	Burkina Faso	1–0	1–0	2002 FIFA World Cup qualification
22	5 May 2001	Johannesburg, South Africa	Zimbabwe	1–0	2–1	2002 FIFA World Cup qualification
23	10 November 2001	Johannesburg, South Africa	Egypt	1–0	1–0	Nelson Mandela Challenge
24	19 November 2002	Johannesburg, South Africa	Senegal	1–0	1–1	Nelson Mandela Challenge
25	22 June 2003	Polokwane, South Africa	Ivory Coast	1–0	2–1	2004 African Nations Cup qualification
26	3 July 2004	Johannesburg, South Africa	Burkina Faso	2–0	2–0	2006 FIFA World Cup qualification
27	17 November 2004	Johannesburg, South Africa	Nigeria	1–0	2–1	Nelson Mandela Challenge
28	7 September 2005	Bremen, Germany	Germany	1–1	2–4	Friendly

== Honours ==
=== Player ===
FC Zürich

- Swiss Cup: 2000

Kaizer Chiefs

- Telkom Knockout: 2007
- MTN 8: 2008

South Africa

- African Cup of Nations: 1996

Individual

- BBC Goal of the Season: 2000–01

=== Manager ===
Golden Arrows

- National First Division: 2014–15

Cape Town Spurs

- DSTV Premiership Promotional Playoffs: 2022-23
