= David Opango =

Burundian footballer

Personal information
- Full name: Ramadhani Opango
- Date of birth: 19 March 1978 (age 48)
- Height: 1.79 m (5 ft 10 in)
- Position: Right-back

Senior career*
Years	Team	Apps	(Gls)
1994–1995	Fantastique		
1996–1997	SC Bümpliz 78		
1997–2002	FC Zürich	35	(2)
2002–2006	FC Aarau	74	(3)
2007	FC Biel-Bienne		
2007–2008	SC Zofingen		
2008–2012	Limoges FC		

International career
1999–2001	Burundi	2	(0)
- * Club domestic league appearances and goals

Ramadhani "David" Opango (born 19 March 1978) is a Burundian former professional footballer who played as right-back.

== Career ==
In 2008, Opango joined French lower league side Limoges FC.

== Personal life ==
Like fellow countryman Shabani Nonda, he is a passport-holder of both Burundi and Democratic Republic of the Congo.
