= Paulo Diogo =

Swiss footballer (born 1975)

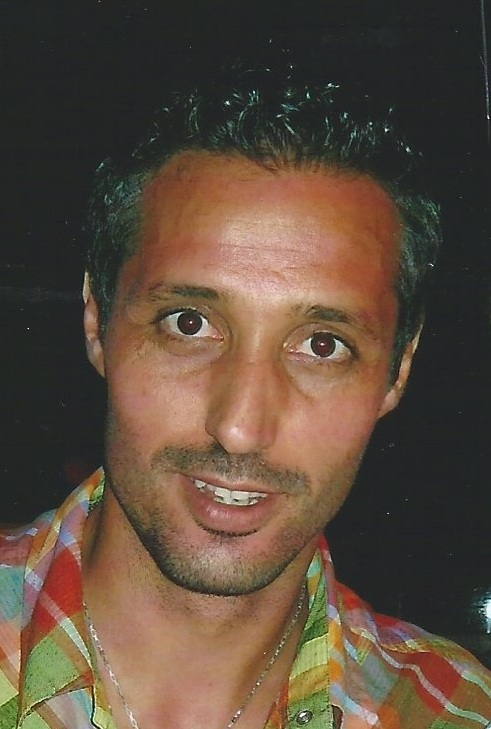

Personal information
- Full name: Paulo da Cruz Diogo
- Date of birth: 21 April 1975 (age 51)
- Place of birth: Crissier, Switzerland
- Height: 1.81 m (5 ft 11 1/2 in)
- Position: Left midfielder

Senior career*
Years	Team	Apps	(Gls)
1994–1999	Lausanne Sports	93	(3)
1997–1998	→ Yverdon Sport (loan)	33	(10)
2000–2004	Servette FC	118	(7)
2001–2002	→ Grenoble Foot 38 (loan)	26	(2)
2005	FC Sion	8	(0)
2006–2008	FC Schaffhausen	85	(6)
2008–2009	Lausanne Sports	14	(0)
2009	ES FC Malley		
2009-2013	FC Dardania Lausanne		
- * Club domestic league appearances and goals as of 26 July 2021

Paulo da Cruz Diogo (born 21 April 1975) is a Swiss former professional footballer. He played much of his professional career in the Swiss first division.

He is now manager of ES FC Malley which he joined in July 2021.

== Career ==
On 5 December 2004, playing for Servette FC in an away game against FC Schaffhausen, Diogo set up a goal for Jean Beausejour in the 87th minute of the game. By way of celebration, he jumped up on the metal perimeter fence separating the fans from the pitch. Unnoticed by him, his wedding ring caught in the barrier (Diogo had married not long before). As he jumped off the fence, much of his finger tore off along with the ring.

To add insult to injury, referee Florian Etter then penalized him with a yellow card for excessive time-wasting with his "celebrations". In fact, the match stewards were searching for his finger. Later that night, Diogo was taken to a Zürich hospital, but the doctors failed to re-attach the severed part of the finger and advised that the remaining part of his finger be amputated to the first joint. He has continued to play football since the accident. The event generated international commotion, and served as a warning of the danger of hanging on places or objects while using any type of ring, such as the wedding ring.

After being released by Sion, he signed for FC Schaffhausen on 28 January 2006.
