= Aleksandar Đorđević (footballer, born 1968) =

Personal information
- Full name: Aleksandar Đorđević
- Date of birth: 14 July 1968 (age 58)
- Place of birth: Belgrade, SFR Yugoslavia
- Height: 1.90 m (6 ft 3 in)
- Position: Defender

Youth career
- 1980–1986: Partizan

Senior career*
| Years | Team | Apps | (Gls) |
| 1986–1992 | Partizan | 69 | (1) |
| 1992–1993 | Napredak | 13 | (2) |
| 1993–1994 | Morwell Falcons | 13 | (2) |
| 1994–1995 | Bonnyrigg White Eagles | | |
| 1996–1997 | Zvezdara | | |
| 1997–1998 | Gorica | 20 | (2) |
| 1998 | Partizan | 10 | (1) |
| 1998–2001 | Zürich | 24 | (0) |
| 2001–2006 | KÍ | 85 | (16) |
| 2007 | LÍF | 1 | (0) |
| 2010 | KÍ | 3 | (0) |

Managerial career
- 2009: KÍ Klaksvík
- 2010–2011: KÍ Klaksvík
- 2012–????: KÍ Klaksvík (women)
- * Club domestic league appearances and goals

Aleksandar Đorđević (Serbian Cyrillic: Александар Ђорђевић, pronounced [aleksǎːndar dʑǒːrdʑeʋitɕ]; also transliterated Aleksandar Djordjević; born 14 July 1968) is a football coach and former player.

He was part of the FK Partizan era that enjoyed great success in the Yugoslav First League in the late 1980s, finishing in the top three four times between 1986 and 1992 (including winning the 1986–87 Yugoslav First League). He was part of the squad that won the 1988–89 Yugoslav Cup.

After a brief spell with FK Napredak Kruševac, He eventually moved to Australia and joined the Morwell Falcons in 1993 and formed part of their late-season run towards the 1993–94 National Soccer League finals, which they missed by a solitary point.

Đorđević scored twice for the Falcons during his stint in the NSL, including the winner against a star-studded Melbourne Knights team in Round 13.

In August 2013 Đorđević was appointed to the coaching staff of the Faroe Islands women's national football team.

== Honours ==
FC Zürich

- Swiss Cup: 1999–2000
