= Gian (footballer, born 1974) =

Brazilian footballer

Personal information
- Full name: Giancarlo Dias Dantas
- Date of birth: 25 August 1974 (age 52)
- Place of birth: Sertanejo, Brazil
- Height: 1.74 m (5 ft 9 in)
- Positions: Midfielder; forward

Youth career
- –1989: Matsubara
- 1990–1993: Vasco da Gama

Senior career*
Years	Team	Apps	(Gls)
1993–1998	Vasco da Gama	26	(2)
1997	→ América-RN (loan)	20	(4)
1999	Matonense		
1999–2002	Luzern	73	(10)
2002	Portuguesa Santista		
2003–2005	Remo		
2005	Vasco da Gama	2	(0)
2005	Paysandu	20	(2)
2006	Ceará		
2007	Goiás		
2008	Castanhal		
2010	Remo	8	(0)
2011	Castanhal		
2011–2012	Independente Tucuruí	11	(2)

International career
1991	Brazil U17	4	(0)
1993	Brazil U20	6	(3)
- * Club domestic league appearances and goals

Giancarlo Dias Dantas (born 25 August 1974), commonly known as Gian, is a Brazilian former footballer.

== Career statistics ==
=== Club ===
Club	Season	League			State League		Cup		Continental		Other		Total	
Club	Season	Division	Apps	Goals	Apps	Goals	Apps	Goals	Apps	Goals	Apps	Goals	Apps	Goals
Vasco da Gama	1993	Série A	7	0	23 (Note: Appearances in the Campeonato Carioca)	4	0	0	–		0	0	30	4
Vasco da Gama	1994	Série A	13	2	14	0	2 (Note: Appearances in the Copa do Brasil)	1	–		0	0	29	3
Vasco da Gama	1995	Série A	0	0	18	6	1	0	–		0	0	19	6
Vasco da Gama	1996	Série A	2	0	7	0	0	0	–		0	0	9	0
Vasco da Gama	1997	Série A	0	0	0	0	0	0	–		0	0	0	0
Vasco da Gama	1998	Série A	4	0	7	2	0	0	–		1 (Note: Appearances in the Torneio Rio – São Paulo)	0	12	2
Vasco da Gama	Total		26	2	69	10	3	1	0	0	1	0	99	13
América-RN (loan)	1997	Série A	20	4	0	0	0	0	–		0	0	20	4
Luzern	1999–00	Nationalliga A	22	3	–		0	0	–		0	0	22	3
Luzern	2000–01	Nationalliga A	20	2	–		0	0	–		0	0	20	2
Luzern	2001–02	Nationalliga A	31	5	–		0	0	–		0	0	31	5
Luzern	Total		73	10	0	0	0	0	0	0	0	0	73	10
Vasco da Gama	2005	Série A	2	0	0	0	0	0	–		0	0	2	0
Paysandu	2005	Série A	20	2	0	0	0	0	–		0	0	20	2
Remo	2010	Série D	8	0	0	0	3	0	–		0	0	11	0
Independente Tucuruí	2011	Série D	11	2	0	0	3	0	–		0	0	11	2
Independente Tucuruí	2012	–			2 (Note: Appearances in the Campeonato Paraense)	0	2	0	–		0	0	4	0
Independente Tucuruí	Total		11	2	2	0	5	0	0	0	0	0	18	2
Career total			152	20	71	10	11	1	0	0	1	0	235	31
