= Gocha Jamarauli =

Georgian footballer (born 1971)

Personal information
- Date of birth: 23 July 1971 (age 55)
- Place of birth: Gardabani, Soviet Union
- Height: 1.82 m (6 ft 0 in)
- Position: Midfielder

Senior career*
| Years | Team | Apps | (Gls) |
| 1990–1996 | Dinamo Tbilisi | 123 | (35) |
| 1996 | Alania Vladikavkaz | 9 | (0) |
| 1997–1998 | Trabzonspor | 27 | (3) |
| 1998–2002 | FC Zürich | 68 | (12) |
| 2002 | → Luzern (loan) | 8 | (2) |
| 2002–2004 | Metalurh Donetsk | 59 | (5) |
| 2005 | Dinamo Tbilisi | 8 | (1) |
| 2005–2006 | Anorthosis Famagusta | | |
| Total | | 311 | (57) |

International career
| 1994–2004 | Georgia | 62 | (6) |
- * Club domestic league appearances and goals

Gocha Jamarauli (Georgian: გოჩა ჯამარაული; born 23 July 1971) is a Georgian former professional footballer who played as a midfielder. He collected 62 caps and as of 2008 is the tenth most capped player of the Georgia national team.

== Club career ==
Jamarauli's club career started in Dinamo Tbilisi when Georgian football league was formed in 1990, the Dinamo team won several titles in a row, and Jamarauli was a key player during this period. In 1996, he wanted to play abroad, and moved to Russian (North Ossetian) team Alania Vladikavkaz, and the next season to Trabzonspor of Turkey.

Neither spell was very successful, so he got a transfer to Swiss club FC Zürich in summer 1998 where he spent four seasons until leaving following a contract dispute. Via another Swiss team, FC Luzern, he joined Metalurh Donetsk in the Ukrainian league, where he would spend two and a half seasons. Following brief spells with Dinamo Tbilisi and Anorthosis Famagusta he announced his retirement from professional football.

== International career ==
Jamarauli was a regular in the Georgia national team, and played 62 international matches and scored 6 goals between 1994 and 2004. With his team won Malta International Football Tournament 1998. He made his début on 8 February 1994.

== Career statistics ==
Scores and results list Georgia's goal tally first, score column indicates score after each Jamarauli goal.

List of international goals scored by Gocha Jamarauli
| No. | Date | Venue | Opponent | Score | Result | Competition |
|---|---|---|---|---|---|---|
| 1 | 23 June 1994 | Riga, Latvia | Latvia | | 3–1 | Friendly |
| 2 | 27 March 1996 | Limassol, Cyprus | Cyprus | | 2–0 | Friendly |
| 3 | 6 February 1998 | Valletta, Malta | Latvia | | 2–1 | Friendly |
| 4 | 6 February 1998 | Valletta, Malta | Latvia | | 2–1 | Friendly |
| 5 | 10 February 1998 | Valletta, Malta | Malta | | 3–1 | Friendly |
| 6 | 1 September 2001 | Tbilisi, Georgia | Hungary | | 3–1 | 2002 FIFA World Cup qualification |

== Honours ==
FC Zürich

- Swiss Cup: 1999–2000
