= Cédric Horjak =

French footballer (born 1979)

Cédric Horjak (born 24 February 1979 in Saint-Étienne) is a French former football midfielder.

Horjak played in Ligue 2 for AS Saint-Étienne. (Note: Cédric Horjak – French league stats at LFP – also available in French (archived)) He also played for Lausanne-Sports, FC Arlès-Avignon and Nîmes Olympique.
