= Marcin Kuźba =

Polish footballer

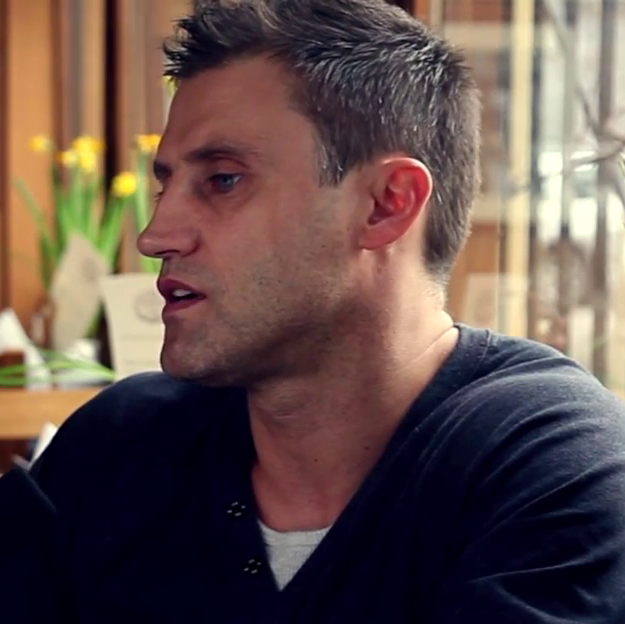
- Kuźba in 2014

Personal information
- Date of birth: 15 April 1977 (age 49)
- Place of birth: Tomaszów Mazowiecki, Poland
- Height: 1.83 m (6 ft 0 in)
- Position: Forward

Youth career
- 1989–1992: LKS Lubochnia
- 1992–1995: Gwarek Zabrze

Senior career*
Years	Team	Apps	(Gls)
1995–1998	Górnik Zabrze	83	(31)
1998–1999	Auxerre	5	(0)
1999–2001	Lausanne	70	(35)
2001–2002	Saint-Étienne	27	(4)
2002–2003	Wisła Kraków	27	(21)
2003–2004	Olympiakos	10	(5)
2004–2007	Wisła Kraków	23	(5)
2007	Górnik Zabrze	6	(0)
Total		251	(101)

International career
1995–2003	Poland	6	(2)
- * Club domestic league appearances and goals

Marcin Kuźba (born 15 April 1977) is a Polish former professional footballer who played as a forward. He was most recently the sporting director of Podbeskidzie Bielsko-Biała.

In his career, he has played for clubs such as Górnik Zabrze, Auxerre, Lausanne, Saint-Étienne, Wisła Kraków and Olympiacos.

From 1995 to 2003 he made six caps for Poland national team, scoring two goals. He retired from his professional career after leaving Górnik Zabrze on a mutual agreement on 17 May 2007. In January 2009, in one of the interviews, he mentioned the possibility of signing for a lower league team.

== Honours ==
Wisła Kraków

- Ekstraklasa: 2002–03, 2004–05
- Polish Cup: 2002–03
