= Oscar Londono =

Colombian-born footballer and manager (born 1971)

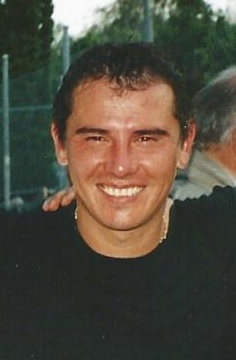

Personal information
- Date of birth: 7 February 1971 (age 55)
- Place of birth: Bucaramanga, Colombia
- Height: 1.71 m (5 ft 7 in)
- Positions: Defender; midfielder

Senior career*
Years	Team	Apps	(Gls)
1991–1994	FC Lausanne-Sport	62	(0)
1994–1995	FC Grenchen	33	(2)
1995–1996	SC Kriens	34	(0)
1996–2000	FC Lausanne-Sport	128	(6)
2000–2008	Servette FC	167	(8)
Total		424	(16)

Managerial career
- 2012–2013: Servette FC (U21)
- 2016–2018: FC Stade Nyonnais
- 2018–2020: FC Sion (assistant manager)
- * Club domestic league appearances and goals

Oscar Londono (born 7 February 1971) is a Colombian-born former football midfielder. He later worked as a manager for football clubs in France and Switzerland.
