= Adam Ndlovu =

Zimbabwean footballer (1970–2012)

Personal information
- Full name: Adam Ndlovu
- Date of birth: 26 June 1970
- Place of birth: Rhodesia
- Date of death: 16 December 2012 (aged 42)
- Place of death: Victoria Falls, Zimbabwe
- Height: 1.73 m (5 ft 8 in)
- Position: Striker

Senior career*
Years	Team	Apps	(Gls)
1992–1994	Highlanders	23	(4)
1994–1997	SC Kriens	62	(20)
1997–2000	SR Delémont	104	(39)
2000–2001	FC Zürich	18	(4)
2001–2002	Highlanders	25	(12)
2002–2003	Moroka Swallows	23	(7)
2003–2004	Dynamos		
2004–2005	Free State Stars		

International career
1992–2004	Zimbabwe	57	(34)
- * Club domestic league appearances and goals

Adam Ndlovu (26 June 1970 – 16 December 2012) was a footballer, who played as a striker.

During his club career, he played for Highlanders, SC Kriens, SR Delémont, FC Zürich, Moroka Swallows, Dynamos and Free State Stars, and was also a member of the Zimbabwe national team.

His brother, Peter Ndlovu, is also a former professional footballer.

He attended Mzilikazi High School.

Ndlovu died after a tyre burst on the car in which he was travelling near Victoria Falls Airport, causing the car to leave the road and hit a tree. His brother Peter was critically injured.
