= Lionel Pizzinat =

Swiss footballer (born 1977)

Personal information
- Date of birth: 9 August 1977 (age 49)
- Place of birth: Vernier, Switzerland
- Height: 1.83 m (6 ft 0 in)
- Position: Midfielder

Senior career*
Years	Team	Apps	(Gls)
1995–2001	Servette	135	(6)
1999	→ Lausanne-Sports (loan)	18	(0)
2001–2004	Bari	87	(5)
2005	Verona	3	(0)
2005–2006	Venezia	7	(0)
2006–2013	Servette	184	(4)
- * Club domestic league appearances and goals

Lionel Pizzinat (born 8 August 1977) is a Swiss footballer who spent most of his playing career at Servette FC.

== Career ==
Pizzinat started his career at the Geneva club Servette. During the 2001–02 season, he moved to the Serie B club A.S. Bari until January 2005, when he moved to their league rival Verona. The following season, he played for Venezia at Serie C2, but on 5 April 2006 Pizzinat returned to Servette at 1. Liga for their team rebuild after they were declared bankrupt.
