= 1999–2000 Nationalliga A =

Swiss football season

Nationalliga A
- Season: 1999–2000
- Champions: St. Gallen; 2nd title
- Relegated: Delémont
- Top goalscorer: Charles Amoah (25 goals)

The 1999–2000 season of the Swiss Nationalliga contained two divisions, each with twelve clubs. The top tier was called Nationalliga A (NLA) (French: Ligue Nationale A, Italian: Lega Nazionale A) and the second tier was named Nationalliga B (NLB).

== Overview ==
The season was divided into two phases. The first of which was the qualification phase, and within the divisions the teams played a double round-robin, one at home and the other away. The divisions were then split. The first eight teams of the NLA then competed in the championship group and played a further double round-robin. The teams in ninth to twelfth position competed with the top four teams of the NLB in a promotion/relegation group to decide which four teams would play top tier next season. The other eight teams of the second tier competed in a play-out against relegation to the 1. Liga and the last two teams were to be relegated.

== Nationalliga A ==
At the end of the season FC St. Gallen won the championship.

=== Qualification phase ===
==== Table ====
Pos	Team	Pld	W	D	L	GF	GA	GD	Pts	Qualification
1	St. Gallen	22	13	6	3	42	25	+17	45	Advance to championship round halved points (rounded up) as bonus
2	Basel	22	9	10	3	31	21	+10	37	Advance to championship round halved points (rounded up) as bonus
3	Lausanne-Sport	22	9	9	4	35	25	+10	36	Advance to championship round halved points (rounded up) as bonus
4	Grasshopper Club	22	9	7	6	40	25	+15	34	Advance to championship round halved points (rounded up) as bonus
5	Yverdon-Sport	22	7	9	6	28	25	+3	30	Advance to championship round halved points (rounded up) as bonus
6	Xamax	22	7	7	8	34	33	+1	28	Advance to championship round halved points (rounded up) as bonus
7	Luzern	22	8	4	10	28	29	−1	28	Advance to championship round halved points (rounded up) as bonus
8	Servette	22	8	4	10	32	36	−4	28	Advance to championship round halved points (rounded up) as bonus
9	Zürich	22	6	8	8	21	29	−8	26	Continue to promotion/relegation round
10	Aarau	22	7	5	10	30	42	−12	26	Continue to promotion/relegation round
11	Lugano	22	5	6	11	27	34	−7	21	Continue to promotion/relegation round
12	Delémont	22	4	5	13	24	48	−24	17	Continue to promotion/relegation round

Source: rsssf.com
Rules for classification: 1) points; 2) goal difference; 3) number of goals scored.

==== Results ====
Home \ Away	AAR	BAS	DEL	GCZ	LS	LUG	LUZ	NX	SER	STG	YS	ZÜR
Aarau		1–3	4–2	2–1	1–3	0–2	1–0	4–1	3–2	1–0	1–1	1–1
Basel	2–1		3–0	1–1	3–3	1–0	2–0	1–1	0–0	4–1	1–2	0–0
Delémont	4–2	2–2		2–1	1–1	1–0	0–1	2–2	1–3	0–3	1–3	2–2
Grasshopper	4–0	1–1	4–0		1–1	2–1	2–0	4–0	4–2	2–2	0–0	2–1
Lausanne-Sport	3–1	1–0	3–0	3–3		2–0	2–1	0–2	0–1	0–1	2–2	2–0
Lugano	4–1	1–1	1–2	1–5	1–1		1–1	2–1	3–0	1–1	2–2	1–1
Luzern	2–1	3–0	2–0	2–0	2–1	3–0		1–1	2–4	2–2	4–1	0–1
Neuchâtel Xamax	1–1	1–2	2–0	0–1	1–2	3–1	3–1		3–2	2–2	1–1	3–0
Servette	1–1	1–1	1–1	2–1	0–1	1–3	1–0	2–4		2–1	3–1	3–0
St. Gallen	4–1	1–1	2–1	2–1	2–2	2–1	2–0	2–1	2–0		3–2	3–0
Yverdon-Sport	1–1	0–1	3–1	2–0	0–0	1–0	3–0	0–0	2–1	0–1		1–1
Zürich	0–1	0–1	3–1	0–0	2–2	2–1	1–1	2–1	2–0	1–3	1–0	

Source: RSSSF
Legend: Blue = home team win; Yellow = draw; Red = away team win.

=== Champion Playoffs ===
The first eight teams of the qualification then competed in the Championship Round. They took half of the points (rounded up to complete units) gained in the Qualification as bonus with them.

==== Table ====
Pos	Team	Pld	W	D	L	GF	GA	GD	BP	Pts	Qualification
1	St. Gallen (C)	14	9	4	1	33	14	+19	23	54	Qualification to Champions League third qualifying round
2	Lausanne-Sport	14	8	2	4	22	13	+9	18	44	Qualification to UEFA Cup qualifying round
3	Basel	14	5	6	3	16	16	0	19	40	Qualification to UEFA Cup qualifying round
4	Grasshopper Club	14	5	5	4	30	26	+4	17	37	Qualification to Intertoto Cup first round
5	Luzern	14	5	2	7	17	30	−13	14	31	
6	Servette	14	4	5	5	25	21	+4	14	31	
7	Xamax	14	4	3	7	25	29	−4	14	29	Qualification to Intertoto Cup first round
8	Yverdon-Sport	14	2	1	11	16	35	−19	15	22	

Source: rsssf.com
Rules for classification: 1) points; 2) Position in the qualification.
(C) Champions

==== Results ====
Home \ Away	BAS	GCZ	LS	LUZ	NX	SER	STG	YS
Basel		2–2	0–3	0–0	1–1	1–0	3–1	2–0
Grasshopper	3–0		1–1	0–2	1–3	2–3	4–4	4–1
Lausanne-Sport	0–0	3–1		3–1	2–1	2–1	1–3	2–0
Luzern	3–2	0–1	1–0		1–2	1–1	1–2	2–1
Neuchâtel Xamax	1–2	1–3	1–2	3–1		2–2	0–3	7–2
Servette	1–1	1–3	1–3	6–0	3–3		1–2	2–0
St. Gallen	1–1	1–1	1–0	7–1	3–0	0–0		4–1
Yverdon-Sport	0–1	4–4	2–3	1–0	3–0	1–3	0–1	

Source: RSSSF
Legend: Blue = home team win; Yellow = draw; Red = away team win.

== Nationalliga B ==
=== Qualification phase ===
==== Table ====
Pos	Team	Pld	W	D	L	GF	GA	GD	Pts	Qualification
1	Bellinzona	22	13	5	4	43	17	+26	44	Advance to promotion/relegation NLA/LNB round
2	Sion	22	12	4	6	41	21	+20	40	Advance to promotion/relegation NLA/LNB round
3	Thun	22	10	8	4	34	24	+10	38	Advance to promotion/relegation NLA/LNB round
4	Baden	22	10	7	5	32	20	+12	37	Advance to promotion/relegation NLA/LNB round
5	Kriens	22	10	7	5	37	28	+9	37	Continue to relegation round NLB/1. Liga halved points (rounded up) as bonus
6	Étoile Carouge	22	9	8	5	24	18	+6	35	Continue to relegation round NLB/1. Liga halved points (rounded up) as bonus
7	Winterthur	22	9	3	10	30	33	−3	30	Continue to relegation round NLB/1. Liga halved points (rounded up) as bonus
8	Wil	22	8	5	9	40	41	−1	29	Continue to relegation round NLB/1. Liga halved points (rounded up) as bonus
9	Solothurn	22	7	2	13	29	37	−8	23	Continue to relegation round NLB/1. Liga halved points (rounded up) as bonus
10	Young Boys	22	5	6	11	31	45	−14	21	Continue to relegation round NLB/1. Liga halved points (rounded up) as bonus
11	Stade Nyonnais	22	5	3	14	30	53	−23	18	Continue to relegation round NLB/1. Liga halved points (rounded up) as bonus
12	Schaffhausen	22	2	6	14	16	50	−34	12	Continue to relegation round NLB/1. Liga halved points (rounded up) as bonus

Source: RSSSF
Rules for classification: 1) points; 2) goal difference; 3) number of goals scored.

=== Promotion/relegation group NLA/NLB ===
The teams in the ninth to twelfth positions in Nationalliga A competed with the top four teams of Nationalliga B in a Nationalliga A/B promotion/relegation round.

==== Table ====
Pos	Team	Pld	W	D	L	GF	GA	GD	Pts	Promotion or relegation
1	Lugano	14	8	4	2	26	18	+8	28	Remain in NLA
2	Sion (P)	14	7	3	4	28	19	+9	24	Promoted to NLA
3	Zürich	14	7	3	4	17	12	+5	24	Remain in NLA
4	Aarau	14	6	4	4	23	16	+7	22	Remain in NLA
5	Bellinzona	14	4	8	2	21	14	+7	20	Remain in NLB
6	Thun	14	4	4	6	17	18	−1	16	Remain in NLB
7	Delémont (R)	14	4	2	8	18	29	−11	14	Relegated to NLB
8	Baden	14	1	2	11	7	31	−24	5	Remain in NLB

Source: rsssf.com
Rules for classification: 1) points; 2) goal difference; 3) number of goals scored.
(P) Promoted; (R) Relegated

==== Results ====
Home \ Away	AAR	BAD	BEL	DEL	LUG	SIO	THU	ZÜR
Aarau		2–0	1–1	5–2	2–2	3–1	2–0	0–0
Baden	1–3		0–0	0–2	0–3	1–3	1–1	0–1
Bellinzona	2–2	3–1		5–0	0–0	2–0	0–2	0–0
Delémont	0–1	3–0	0–4		0–3	3–2	2–3	0–2
Lugano	3–2	1–0	1–1	1–1		4–2	2–1	2–1
Sion	2–0	4–1	2–2	2–1	4–0		3–0	1–0
Thun	1–0	4–0	1–1	1–1	2–3	0–0		0–1
Zürich	1–0	1–2	4–0	0–3	2–1	2–2	2–1	

Source: RSSSF
Legend: Blue = home team win; Yellow = draw; Red = away team win.

=== Relegation group NLB/1. Liga ===
The last eight teams of the qualification phase competed in the relegation group against relegation to the 1. Liga. The teams took half of the points (rounded up to complete units) gained in the qualification as bonus with them.

==== Table ====
Pos	Team	Pld	W	D	L	GF	GA	GD	BP	Pts	Relegation
1	Wil	14	6	6	2	20	12	+8	15	39	Remain in NLB
2	Kriens	14	5	4	5	17	19	−2	19	38	Remain in NLB
3	Winterthur	14	5	7	2	23	16	+7	15	37	Remain in NLB
4	Young Boys	14	6	6	2	22	13	+9	11	35	Remain in NLB
5	Étoile Carouge	14	1	8	5	10	17	−7	18	29	Remain in NLB
6	Solothurn	14	4	3	7	15	20	−5	12	27	Remain in NLB
7	Stade Nyonnais	14	3	5	6	19	27	−8	9	23	Relegated to 1. Liga
8	Schaffhausen	14	3	7	4	20	22	−2	6	22	Relegated to 1. Liga

Source: RSSSF
Rules for classification: 1) points; 2) Position in the qualification.

== Attendances ==
#	Club	Average
1	St. Gallen	10,006
2	GCZ	7,700
3	Basel	7,684
4	Luzern	7,611
5	Xamax	5,834
6	Zürich	5,462
7	Servette	4,789
8	Lausanne	4,653
9	Yverdon	4,104
10	Aarau	3,627
11	Lugano	3,234
12	Delémont	3,106

== Sources ==
- RSSSF
