= 2002–03 FC Zürich season =

FC Zürich
2002–03 season
- Owner: Sven Hotz
- Club president: Sven Hotz
- Head-coach from then: Georges Bregy until 26 March, Walter Grüter (interim)
- Ground: Letzigrund
- 2002–03 NLA Qualification: 5th of 12
- Championship round: 5th of 8
- 2002–03 Swiss Cup: Round 5
- 2002 UEFA Intertoto Cup: Round 3
- Top goalscorer: League: Alhassane Keita (17); All: Alhassane Keita (20)

The 2002–03 season was FC Zürich's 106th season in their existence, since their foundation in 1896. It was their thirteenth consecutive season in the top flight of Swiss football, following their promotion at the end of the 1989–90 season.

== Overview ==
The local businessman and property dealer Sven Hotz was the club's chairman and patron at this time. He had taken over as club president at the AGM in 1986. The contract with last season's head-coach Georges Bregy was prolonged for another season, his assistant coach Walter Grüter also remained in his position. FCZ played their home games in the Letzigrund, a stadium also used by the athletics club LC Zürich. The stadium originally opened in 1925, was partially rebuilt in 1973 and was modernised during the mid-90's. The stadium is located in the west of Zurich in the district of Altstetten, which is about three kilometers from the city center.

The FCZ first team competed in this years domestic first-tier 2002–03 Nationalliga A with the clear intention of retaining their top level status and reaching the championship group for the second half of the season. Which meant the team had to reach at least eighth position at the end of the qualification round. A further aim was to reach one of the top three positions and so qualify for a UEFA European competition. The team also competed in 2001–02 Swiss Cup. The team had not qualified for any of the UEFA European tournaments, however they did enter the 2002 UEFA Intertoto Cup.

After the winter break, the team collected a measly two points from the first four matches. Due to a severe lack of sporting success and a rapid decline in team performance during the spring campaign, the match in Geneva in the brand new Stade de Genève on 26 March turned out to be the last FCZ game with Georges Bregy as head-coach. His dismissal, by club president Sven Hotz, came immediately after the 2-1 defeat against Servette. The loss caused the FCZ to drop to the very bottom (8th place) of the NLA final round table, trailing 18 points behind their local rivals, Grasshopper Club. Hotz immediately appointed assistant Walter Grüter as the interim replacement to finish the season.

== Players ==
The following is the list of the FCZ first team squad this season. It also includes players that were in the squad the day the domestic league season started, on 3 July 2002, but subsequently left the club after that date.

Note: Flags indicate national team as defined under FIFA eligibility rules; some limited exceptions apply. Players may hold more than one non-FIFA nationality.

No.	Pos.	Nation	Player
—	GK	SVK	Miroslav König (league games: 28)
—	GK	SUI	Davide Taini (league games: 8)
—	DF	MAR	Tariq Chihab (league games: 28)
—	DF	SUI	Urs Fischer (league games: 31)
—	DF	NED	Wilco Hellinga (league games: 26)
—	DF	SUI	Sébastien Jeanneret (league games: 13)
—	DF	SUI	Stephan Keller (league games: 31)
—	DF	SUI	Alain Nef (league games: 27)
—	DF	SUI	David Pallas (league games: 20)
—	DF	SUI	Yvan Quentin (league games: 28)
—	MF	CIV	Kanga Akalé (league games: 18)
—	MF	ARG	Sergio Bastida (league games: 18)
—	MF	SUI	Francesco Di Jorio (league games: 13)

No.	Pos.	Nation	Player
—	MF	SUI	Daniel Gygax (league games: 31)
—	MF	ITA	Luca Iodice (league games: 30)
—	MF	SUI	Adnan Jashari (league games: 1)
—	MF	SUI	Mario Raimondi (league games: 23)
—	MF	SUI	Marc Schneider (league games: 7)
—	MF	SUI	Daniel Tarone (league games: 26)
—	FW	TUR	Mahir Cayir (league games: 3)
—	FW	BRA	Jefferson Batista (league games: 9)
—	FW	ARG	Francisco Guerrero (league games: 18)
—	FW	NIG	Lucky Isibor (league games: 0)
—	FW	GUI	Alhassane Keita (league games: 29)
—	MF	SUI	Vural Oenen (league games: 1)
—	FW	SUI	Ursal Yasar (league games: 23)

Players who joined the squad

The following is the list of players that joined the FCZ first team squad in the off or pre-season or during the winter-break transfer window. It also includes players that advanced from the youth team during the season and achieved at least one domestic league appearance.

Note: Flags indicate national team as defined under FIFA eligibility rules; some limited exceptions apply. Players may hold more than one non-FIFA nationality.

No.	Pos.	Nation	Player
—	FW	BRA	Jefferson Batista (from St. Gallen)
—	MF	SUI	Sergio Bastida (from Lugano)
—	FW	TUR	Mahir Cayir (returned, following loan to Luzern)
—	MF	SUI	Francesco Di Jorio (from Luzern)
—	FW	NIG	Lucky Isibor (from Suwon Samsung Bluewings)

No.	Pos.	Nation	Player
—	GK	SVK	Miroslav König (from Basel)
—	MF	SUI	Mario Raimondi (on loan from Thun)
—	MF	SUI	Marc Schneider (from Thun)
—	MF	SUI	Daniel Tarone (from Aarau)

Players who left the squad

The following is the list of the FCZ first team players that left the squad, either during the previous season or in the off-season, before the new domestic season began. Note: Flags indicate national team as defined under FIFA eligibility rules; some limited exceptions apply. Players may hold more than one non-FIFA nationality.

No.	Pos.	Nation	Player
—	GK	SUI	Marco Pascolo (to Servette)
—	DF	ITA	Mauro Giannini (to Concordia)
—	DF	LIE	Martin Stocklasa (to Vaduz)
—	MF	SUI	Patrick Baumann (to Thun)
—	MF	SUI	Patrick Bühlmann (to Kriens)
—	MF	SUI	Sandro Burki (to FC Bayern Munich II)
—	MF	SUI	Philippe Douglas (to Baden)

No.	Pos.	Nation	Player
—	MF	SUI	Marcel Heldmann (to Baden)
—	MF	GEO	Gocha Jamarauli (to Metalurh Donetsk)
—	MF	SUI	Feliciano Magro (returned to Udinese after loan)
—	FW	SUI	Frédéric Chassot (to Xamax)
—	FW	GEO	Mikheil Kavelashvili (to Luzern)
—	FW	SUI	Pascal Renfer (to Thun)

== Results ==
Legend

Win Draw Loss Postponed

=== Nationalliga A ===
==== Qualification phase ====
The qualification round to the 2002–03 league season was contested by twelve teams. This phase began with one match on 3 July 2002, the others on 6 July, and was completed on 7 December. The eight teams at the top of the table at the end of the qualification stage were then to compete in the championship play-off round. The teams in ninth to twelfth position competed with the top four teams of the NLB in a promotion/relegation group to decide which two teams would play top tier next season, because the top-tier was to be reduced from twelve to ten clubs.

3 July 2002 Round 1	St. Gallen	0–3	Zürich	Espenmoos, St. Gallen
19:30	Gane (yellow card) 44'	FCZ summary	(yellow card) 20' Quentin; 29' (pen.) Tarone; (yellow card) 32' (yellow-red card) 54' Akalé; 36' (0:2) Keita; (yellow card) 64' Fischer; 81' (0:3) Keita	Attendance: 8,000; Referee: (Switzerland) Markus Nobs (Wohlen bei Bern)

10 July 2002 Round 2	Zürich	1–2	Grasshopper Club	Letzigrund, Zürich
19:30	Keita (yellow card) 15'; Keita 35' (1:0); Iodice (yellow card) 73'	FCZ summary	(yellow card) 17' Hodel; (yellow card) 52' Barijho; 75' (1:1) Eduardo; (yellow card) 82' Baturina; 90' (1:2) Baturina	Attendance: 14,200; Referee: (Liechtenstein) Roland Beck (Triesenberg)
Note: FCZ without Akalé (suspended)

16 July 2002 Round 3	Zürich	3–1	Servette	Letzigrund, Zürich
19:30	Keita 73' (1:1); Hellinga (yellow card) 37'; Hellinga 65' (2:1); Keita 79' (3:1); Quentin (yellow card) 82'	FCZ summary	29' (o.g.) (Fischer); (yellow card) 64' Pascolo; (yellow card) 67' (yellow-red card) 84' Miéville	Attendance: 5,300; Referee: (Switzerland) Massimo Busacca (Monte Carasso/Bellinzona)

20 July 2002 Round 4	Luzern	P–P	Zürich	Stadion Allmend, Luzern
19:30		[ FCZ summary]		Referee: (Switzerland) Reto Rutz (Amriswil)

28 July 2002 Round 5	Zürich	P–P	Thun	Letzigrund, Zürich
		[ FCZ summary]

31 July 2002 Round 4	Luzern	1–3	Zürich	Stadion Allmend, Luzern
19:30	Arrué (yellow card) 55'; Muff 59' (pen.); Mehmeti (yellow card) 65'	FCZ summary	10' (0:1) Gygax; (yellow card) 56' Hellinga; 62' (og 1:2) (Malacarne); 90+1' (1:3) Raimondi	Attendance: 5,551; Referee: (Switzerland) Reto Rutz (Amriswil)
Note: Was originally scheduled for 20 July 2002, but was postponed and rescheduled.

4 August 2002 Round 6	Wil	0–1	Zürich	Stadion Bergholz, Wil
15:15	Balmer (yellow card) 32'; Rizzo (yellow card) 59'; Zellweger (yellow card) 86'	FCZ summary	72' (0:1) Gygax	Attendance: 6,200; Referee: (Switzerland) Martin Salm (Veltheim, Aargau)

7 August 2002 Round 5	Zürich	0–1	Thun	Letzigrund, Zürich
19:30	Nef (yellow card) 49'; Keller (yellow card) 85'	FCZ summary	(yellow card) 22' (yellow-red card) 30' Deumi; 86' (0:1) Aegerter	Attendance: 4,700; Referee: (Switzerland) Guido Wildhaber (Kerzers)
Note: Was originally scheduled for 28 July 2002, but was postponed and rescheduled.

10 August 2002 Round 7	Zürich	0–4	Basel	Letzigrund, Zürich
19:30	Akalé (red card) 33'	FCB summary	8' (0:1) Giménez; 18' (0:2) H. Yakin; (yellow card) 24' Esposito; (yellow card) 28' D. Degen; 31' (0:3) Rossi; 45' (0:4) H. Yakin	Attendance: 10,500; Referee: (Switzerland) Carlo Bertolini (Vira-Gambarogno)
Note: FCZ ohne Keita, Guerrero und Milicevic (alle verletzt). FCB ohne Cantaluppi (gesperrt), Murat Yakin, Koumantarakis, Atouba, Chipperfield und Huggel (alle verletzt).

18 August 2002 Round 8	Aarau	3–1	Zürich	Stadion Brügglifeld, Aarau
16:15	Degen (yellow card) 19'; Diarra 53' (1:1); Diarra 59' (2:1); Seoane (yellow card) 68' de Napoli (yellow card) 77'; Skrzypczak (yellow card) 86'; Diarra 90+3'	FCZ summary FCA summary	6' (0:1) Yasar; (yellow card) 36' Hellinga; (yellow card) 83' Schneider	Attendance: 3,300; Referee: (Switzerland) Massimo Busacca (Monte Carasso/Bellinzona)
Note: FCZ without Akalé (suspended)

24 August 2002 Round 9	Zürich	3–2	Xamax	Letzigrund, Zürich
19:30	Keller 40' (1:0); Keita 58' (2:1); Iodice (yellow card) 62'; Nef (yellow card) 67'; Keller (yellow card) 84'; Tarone 90+1' (3:2)	FCZ summary	48' (1:1) Fonseca; 68' (2:2) Fonseca; (yellow card) 75' Buess; (yellow card) 86' Bettoni	Attendance: 4,200; Referee: (Austria) Stefan Messner
Note: This match was played as part of the interaction referee exchange between the Swiss Football Association and the Austrian Football Association.

31 August 2002 Round 10	Young Boys	2–1	Zürich	Stadion Neufeld, Bern
19:30	Berisha 27' (1:0); (yellow card) 28' Petrosyan; (yellow card) 30' Patrick; Chapuisat 39' (2:1); (yellow card) 74' Berisha	FCZ summary	(yellow card) 21' Keita; 30' (pen.) Iodice; (yellow card) 42' Keller; (yellow card) 75' Jefferson; (yellow card) 89' Hellinga; (yellow card) 90+1' Quentin	Attendance: 7,200; Referee: (Switzerland) Nicole Petignat (Courgenay)
Note: The Young Boys played their home games in the Stadion Neufeld after the Wankdorf Stadium was demolished in 2001 and before the new Stadion Wankdorf was constructed on the same site.

11 September 2002 Round 11	Zürich	1–0	Delémont	Letzigrund, Zürich
19:30	Keita 82' (1:0)	FCZ summary	(yellow card) 52' Kébé; (yellow card) 89' Di Zenzo	Attendance: 2,600; Referee: (Switzerland) Markus Nobs (Wohlen bei Bern)

14 September 2002 Round 12	Zürich	2–1	St. Gallen	Letzigrund, Zürich
19:30	Keita 13' (1:0); Quentin (yellow card) 36'; Keita 86' (2:1); Akalé (yellow card) 84'	FCZ summary	(yellow card) 23' Lerinc; 31' (1:1) Tachie-Mensah; (yellow card) 58' Imhof	Attendance: 5,600; Referee: (Switzerland) Florian Etter

22 September 2002 Round 13	Grasshopper Club	1–1	Zürich	Hardturm, Zürich
16:15	Barijho 8' (1:0); Barijho (yellow card) 24'; Eduardo (yellow card) 33'; Tararache (yellow card) 58'; Cabanas (yellow card) 59'	FCZ summary	(yellow card) 11' Hellinga; (yellow card) 14' Keller; 48' (1:1) Yasar; (yellow card) 75' Chihab; (yellow card) 86' Pallas	Attendance: 12,200; Referee: (Switzerland) Guido Wildhaber (Kerzers)
Note: 28th minute, Barijho was substituted out because of an injury.

27 September 2002 Round 14	Servette	2–0	Zürich	Charmilles Stadium, Geneva
19:30	Bullo (yellow card) 14'; Thurre 27' (1:0); Frei 62' (2:0); Cravero (yellow card) 66'	FCZ summary	(yellow card) 33' Akalé; (yellow card) 55' Pallas; (yellow card) 61' Keller; (yellow card) 90' Quentin; (yellow card) 90+1' Keita; (yellow card) 90+2' Hellinga	Attendance: 4,455; Referee: (Switzerland) Massimo Busacca (Monte Carasso/Bellinzona)
Note: 18th minute, Bastida forced out of play because of an injury.

6 October 2002 Round 15	Zürich	2–1	Luzern	Letzigrund, Zürich
16:15	Keita 36' (1:0); Fischer (yellow card) 66'; Jefferson (yellow card) 72'; Iodice 90+1' (2:1)	FCZ summary	41' (o.g.) (König); (yellow card) 68' Muff; (yellow card) 88' Hofer	Attendance: 5,200; Referee: (Switzerland) Nicole Petignat (Courgenay)

20 October 2002 Round 16	Thun	0–0	Zürich	Stadion Lachen, Thun
16:15	Hodžić (yellow card) 30'; Moser (yellow card) 37'	FCZ summary	(yellow card) 80' Keller	Attendance: 4,200; Referee: (Liechtenstein) Roland Beck (Triesenberg)

26 Ocrober 2002 Round 17	Zürich	1–3	Wil	Letzigrund, Zürich
19:30	Iodice (yellow card) 44'; Raimondi 51' (1:1)	FCZ summary	33' (0:1) Pavlović; 79' (1:2) Bamba; Eugster (yellow card) 90+1'; 90+4' (1:3) Lustrinelli	Attendance: 3,100; Referee: (Switzerland) Dieter Schoch (Attiswil)
Note: FCZ without Hellinga, Schneider and Tarone (all injured).

1 November 2002 Round 18	Basel	5–3	Zürich	St. Jakob-Park, Basel
19:30	Ergić 4' (1:0); Rossi 41' (2:2); Ergić 45+3' (3:2); Rossi 55' (4:2); Varela 77' (5:3)	FCB summary FCZ summary	18' (1:1) Keller; 28' (1:2) Jefferson; (yellow card) 33' Iodice; 56' (og 4:3) (Zwyssig); (yellow card) 82' Jefferson; (yellow card) 90' Yasar	Attendance: 28,870; Referee: (Switzerland) Carlo Bertolini (Vira-Gambarogno)
Note: FCB without Chipperfield and Gimenez (both injured). FCZ without Chihab, Hellinga, Schneider and Tarone (all injured). 57th minute, a cross from Akale hit the outside of the post. 78th minute: Akale left the game due to an injury.

16 November 2002 Round 19	Zürich	1–2	Aarau	Letzigrund, Zürich
17:30	Bastida 32' (1:0); Quentin (yellow card) 22' (yellow-red card) 63'	FCZ summary FCA summary	(yellow card) 23' de Napoli; (yellow card) 36' Pogatetz; (yellow card) 55' Previtali; (yellow card) 69' Diarra; 77' (1:1) de Napoli; 87' (1:2) Chassot; (yellow card) 89' Friedli	Attendance: 4,200; Referee: (Switzerland) Claudio Circhetta (Muttenz)

23 November 2002 Round 20	Xamax	2–2	Zürich	Stade de la Maladière, Neuchâtel
17:30	Simo (yellow card) 23'; M'Futi (yellow card) 35'; Rey 38' (1:2); Rey 43' (2:2)	FCZ summary	9' (o.g.) (Steve von Bergen); (yellow card) 22' Hellinga; (yellow card) 26' Chihab; 35' (0:2) Akalé; (yellow card) 68' Akalé; (yellow card) 18' (yellow-red card) 83' Jeanneret	Attendance: 5,200; Referee: (Switzerland) Nicole Petignat (Courgenay)
Note: 88th minute, Guerrero was substituted ou injured.

1 December 2002 Round 21	Zürich	4–2	Young Boys	Letzigrund, Zürich
14:30	(Joël Magnin) 15' (o.g.); Akalé 40' (2:1); Akalé 63' (3:1); Keita (yellow card) 68'; Akalé 85' (4:2)	FCZ summary	(yellow card) 8' Tikva; 28' (1:1) Petrosyan; (yellow card) 49' Sermeter; (yellow card) 71' Vardanyan; (yellow card) 76' Eugster; 76' (3:2) Rochat	Attendance: 6,500; Referee: (Switzerland) Massimo Busacca (Monte Carasso/Bellinzona)
Note: FCZ without Jeanneret (suspended).

8 December 2002 Round 22	Delémont	2–2	Zürich	La Blancherie, Delémont
14:30	Di Zenzo 25' (1:0); Klötzli (yellow card) 73'; Shereni (yellow card) 75'; Biancavilla (yellow card) 85'; Selimi 88' (pen- 2:2)	FCZ summary	(red card) 18' Fischer; 29' (1:1) Akalé; 34' (1:2) Bastida; (yellow card) 72' Nef; (yellow card) 83' Keller	Attendance: 950; Referee: (Switzerland) Florian Etter

==== League table qualification ====
Pos	Team	Pld	W	D	L	GF	GA	GD	BP	Pts	Qualification
1	Grasshopper Club	22	15	4	3	58	26	+32	0	49	Advance to championship round halved points (rounded up) as bonus
2	Basel	22	14	5	3	57	25	+32	0	47	Advance to championship round halved points (rounded up) as bonus
3	Thun	22	9	4	9	33	33	0	0	31	Advance to championship round halved points (rounded up) as bonus
4	Wil	22	8	7	7	43	45	−2	0	31	Advance to championship round halved points (rounded up) as bonus
5	Zürich	22	9	4	9	35	37	−2	0	31	Advance to championship round halved points (rounded up) as bonus
6	Xamax	22	8	7	7	30	33	−3	0	31	Advance to championship round halved points (rounded up) as bonus
7	Young Boys	22	8	6	8	41	41	0	0	30	Advance to championship round halved points (rounded up) as bonus
8	Servette	22	8	5	9	45	37	+8	0	29	Advance to championship round halved points (rounded up) as bonus
9	Luzern	22	7	5	10	31	38	−7	−2	24	Continue to promotion/relegation round
10	St. Gallen	22	6	6	10	31	48	−17	0	24	Continue to promotion/relegation round
11	SR Delémont	22	6	2	14	24	44	−20	0	20	Continue to promotion/relegation round
12	Aarau	22	5	3	14	19	40	−21	0	18	Continue to promotion/relegation round

Source: RSSSF
Rules for classification: 1) points; 2) goal difference; 3) number of goals scored.
FC Luzern 2 points deducted for irregularities in license application, therefore total points: 24

==== Championship round ====
The first eight teams of the qualification phase competed in the championship playoff round. They took half of the points (rounded up) gained in qualification as bonus with them. This phase began on 1 March 2003 and was completed on 31 May.

1 March 2003 Round 1	Servette	P–P	Zürich	Stade de Genève, Geneva
		[ FCZ summary]
Note: The match was originally scheduled for 1 March, but was postponed and rescheduled on the 26 March, because upcoming inauguration and opening of the new Stade de Genève was to be on 16 March.

9 March 2003 Round 2	Zürich	1–1	Xamax	Letzigrund, Zürich
16:15	Guerrero (yellow card) 34'; Tarone (yellow card) 73'; Yasar 90' (1:1)	FCZ summary	(yellow card) 7' Bättig; (yellow card) 13' Simo; 89' (0:1) Valente	Attendance: 5,600; Referee: (Switzerland) Reto Rutz (Amriswil)
Note: FCZ without Fischer (susoended).

16 March 2003 Round 3	Grasshopper Club	2–0	Zürich	Hardturm, Zürich
16:15	Petrić 12' (1:0); Petrić 32' (2:0); Lichtsteiner (yellow card) 74'; Gamboa (yellow card) 85'	FCZ summary	(yellow card) 3' Yasar; (yellow card) 31' Gygax; (yellow card) 41' Jeanneret; (yellow card) 90+2' Keita	Attendance: 14,800; Referee: (Switzerland) René Rogalla (Wallisellen)

23 March 2003 Round 4	Zürich	1–1	Thun	Letzigrund, Zürich
16:15	Fischer (yellow card) 20'; Guerrero 90' (1:1)	FCZ summary	(yellow card) 18' Cerrone; (yellow card) 64' Parnela; 79' (pen.) Rama; (yellow card) 90+1' Baumann	Attendance: 4,800; Referee: (Switzerland) Florian Etter

26 March 2003 Round 1	Servette	2–1	Zürich	Stade de Genève, Geneva
20:00	Thurre 16' (1:0); Bratić (yellow card) 45'; Thurre 64' (2:1); Comisetti (yellow card) 85'	FCZ summary	27' (1:1) Nef; (yellow card) 78' Hellinga	Attendance: 7,662; Referee: (Switzerland) Massimo Busacca (Monte Carasso/Bellinzona)
Note: The match was originally scheduled for 1 March, but was postponed and rescheduled because the opening of the Stade de Genève was to be on 16 March. This turned out to be the last FCZ game with Georges Bregy as head-coach. His dismissal came immediately after the game.

6 April 2003 Round 5	Zürich	1–2	Basel	Letzigrund, Zürich
16:15	Guerrero 49' (1:1); Chihab (yellow card) 85'; Bastida (yellow card) 89'	FCB summary FCZ summary	8' (0:1) Rossi; 87' (1:2) Huggel; (yellow card) 90+2' Atouba	Attendance: 13,500; Referee: (Switzerland) Markus Nobs (Wohlen bei Bern)
Note: FCZ with new head-coach Walter Grüter on the side-line, but without Hellinga (suspended) as well as Pallas, Quentin and Yasar (all injured). FCB without Murat Yakin, Haas, Cantaluppi and Ergic (all injured). 50th minute: a header from Huggel hit the crossbar.

13 April 2003 Round 6	Young Boys	2–1	Zürich	Stadion Neufeld, Bern
16:15	Rochat 26' (1:0); Petrosyan 10' (2:0); Eugster (yellow card) 45'	FCZ summary	(yellow card) 29' Iodice; (yellow card) 32' Gygax; 77' (2:1) Tarone	Attendance: 9,000; Referee: (Switzerland) Martin Salm (Veltheim, Aargau)
Note: FCZ without Pallas and Yasar (both injured).

16 April 2003 Round 7	Zürich	2–1	Wil	Letzigrund, Zürich
19:30	Keller (yellow card) 35'; Keita (yellow card) 44'; Gygax 58' (1:1); Keita 67' (2:1); Fischer (yellow card) 73'	FCZ summary	11' (0:1) Zellweger; (yellow card) 49' Zellweger; (yellow card) 53' Hasler; (yellow card) 83' Montandon	Attendance: 3,000; Referee: (Switzerland) Nicole Petignat (Courgenay)
Note: FCZ without Pallas and Yasar (both injured). 61st minute, Morales substituted out injured.

26 April 2003 Round 8	Wil	1–0	Zürich	Stadion Bergholz, Wil
19:30	Sutter (yellow card) 14'; Callà (yellow card) 62'; Lustrinelli 68' (1:0); Mangiarratti (yellow card) 31' (yellow-red card) 77'; Lustrinelli (yellow card) 78'	FCZ summary	(yellow card) 12' Gygax; (yellow card) 33' Keller; (yellow card) 45' Di Jorio; (yellow card) 90+1' Iodice	Attendance: 2,500; Referee: (Switzerland) Dieter Schoch (Attiswil)
Note: Wil without Morales (injured). FCZ without Pallas and Yasar (both injured).

3 May 2003 Round 9	Zürich	4–2	Young Boys	Letzigrund, Zürich
19:30	Keita 11' (1:0); Keita 13' (2:0); Fischer (yellow card) 18'; Nef (yellow card) 19'; Guerrero 23' (3:0); Hellinga (yellow card) 69'; Keita 77' (4:2)	FCZ summary	(yellow card) 23' Berisha; (yellow card) 30' Disler; 43' (3:1) Sermeter; 51' (3:2) Magnin; (yellow card) 82' Magnin	Attendance: 5,200; Referee: (Switzerland) Claudio Circhetta (Muttenz)
Note: FCZ without Pallas and Yasar (both injured).

8 May 2003 Round 10	Basel	3–1	Zürich	St. Jakob-Park, Basel
20:15	Rossi 31' (1:0); Rossi (yellow card) 34'; Duruz (yellow card) 39'; Chipperfield 44' (2:0); Giménez 76' (3:0)	FCB summary FCZ summary	(yellow card) 40' Guerrero; 81' (3:1) Bastida	Attendance: 29,780; Referee: (Liechtenstein) Roland Beck (Triesenberg)
Note: FCB without Ergic, Atouba and Tum (all injured). FCZ without Pallas and Yasar (both injured) as well as Keller and Nef (both suspended). 9th minute, a goal by Hakan Yakin was disallowed due to Gimenez being offside. 46th minute, a goal by Rossi was disallowed for an alleged offside.

18 May 2003 Round 11	Thun	1–2	Zürich	Stadion Lachen, Thun
16:15	Aegerter (yellow card) 11'; Streller 24' (1:0); Stettler (yellow card) 55'; Deumi (red card) 68'	FCZ summary	(yellow card) 21' (yellow-red card) 50' Fischer; (yellow card) 27' Quentin; (yellow card) 48' Nef; 75' (1:1) Guerrero; 90+1' (1:2) Quentin	Attendance: 5,137; Referee: (Switzerland) Reto Rutz (Amriswil)
Note: FCZ without Pallas and Yasar (both injured).

21 May 2003 Round 12	Zürich	1–1	Grasshopper Club	Letzigrund, Zürich
20:15	Tarone 35' (1:1); Jeanneret (yellow card) 54'; Guerrero (yellow card) 85'	FCZ summary	(yellow card) 26' Gamboa; 27' (0:1) Eduardo; (yellow card) 42' Tararache	Attendance: 15,500; Referee: (Switzerland) René Rogalla (Wallisellen)
Note: FCZ without Fischer (suspended), Pallas and Yasar (both injured).

24 May 2003 Round 13	Xamax	2–0	Zürich	Stade de la Maladière, Neuchâtel
18:45	Portillo 30' (1:0); Oppliger (yellow card) 42'; Simo 54' (2:0); Portillo (yellow card) 35' (yellow-red card) 61'; Khlifi (yellow card) 73'; Bettoni (yellow card) 81'; Valente (yellow card) 88'	FCZ summary	(yellow card) 61' Nef	Attendance: 7,600; Referee: (Switzerland) Dieter Schoch (Attiswil)

31 May 2003 Round 14	Zürich	5–2	Servette	Letzigrund, Zürich
20:15	Keita 33' (1:0); Keita 31' (2:0); Guerrero (yellow card) 41'; Di Jorio 64' (3:1); Di Jorio 71' (4:1); Keita 90+1' (5:2)	FCZ summary	51' (2:1) Obradović; 76' (4:2) Kader; (yellow card) 77' Zambrella	Attendance: 5,000; Referee: (Switzerland) Carlo Bertolini (Vira-Gambarogno)

==== Final league table ====
Pos	Team	Pld	W	D	L	GF	GA	GD	BP	Pts	Qualification
1	Grasshopper Club	14	9	5	0	37	15	+22	25	57	Swiss champions qualification to Champions League third qualifying round
2	Basel	14	10	2	2	38	17	+21	24	56	Swiss Cup winners qualification to UEFA Cup first round
3	Xamax	14	5	4	5	18	17	+1	16	35	qualification to UEFA Cup qualifying round
4	Young Boys	14	6	1	7	21	29	−8	15	34	qualification to UEFA Cup qualifying round
5	Zürich	14	4	3	7	20	23	−3	16	31	
6	Servette	14	4	4	6	16	26	−10	15	31	
7	Thun	14	3	3	8	18	30	−12	16	28	entered Intertoto Cup second round
8	Wil	14	2	4	8	19	30	−11	16	26	entered Intertoto Cup first round

Source: RSSSF
Rules for classification: 1) points; 2) Position in the qualification round

=== Swiss Cup ===
This season's Swiss Cup was the 78th season of Switzerland's cup competition held annually by the Swiss Football Association (SFV-ASF). It began on 9 August with the first games of Round 1 and ended on 11 May 2003 with the Final which was held at St. Jakob-Park, Basel. The cup winners qualified for a place in the first round of the UEFA Cup. The twelve first-tier clubs from the 2002–03 Nationalliga A had been granted byes for the first four rounds and they joined the competition in the fifth round. The first-tier teams were seeded and cound not be drawn against each other. The draw respected regionalities, when possible, and the lower classed team was granted home advantage.

10 November 2002 Round 5	FC Schaffhausen	2–1	Zürich	Stadion Breite, Schaffhausen
14:30	Toco 27' (1:0); Toco 55' (2:0)	FCZ summary	66' (2:1) Yasar	Attendance: 1,800; Referee: (Switzerland) Reto Rutz (Amriswil)

At the end of the season, Basel won the cup and this was their seventh cup title to this date and their second consecutive cup title.

=== Intertoto Cup ===
==== First round ====
22 June 2002 First leg	Zürich (Switzerland)	7–0	(Bosnia and Herzegovina) Brotnjo	Letzigrund, Zürich
	Keita 5' (1:0); Keita 33' (2:0); Akalé 63' (3:0); Gygax 67' (4:0); Akalé 70' (5:0); Akalé 72' (2:0); Akalé 90' (7:0)	FCZ summary		Attendance: 1,100; Referee: Augustus Constantin (Romania)

29 June 2002 Second leg	Brotnjo (Bosnia and Herzegovina)	2–1 (2–8 agg.)	(Switzerland) Zürich	Bare Stadium, Čitluk
	Ćorić 67' (1:1); Krivić 77' (2:1)	FCZ summary	Keita 50' (0:1)	Attendance: 138; Referee: Costas Theodotou (Cyprus)

Zürich won 8–2 on aggregate.

==== Second round ====
6 July 2002 First leg	Zürich (Switzerland)	1–0	(Estonia) Levadia	Letzigrund, Zürich
	Quentin (yellow card) 80'; Tarone 87' (pen. 1:0)	FCZ summary	(yellow card) Leitan; (yellow card) Vinogradov; (yellow card) Arbeiter	Attendance: 1,350; Referee: Karen Nalbandyan (Armenia)
Note: The very first opening of the Flachpass bar in the west stand. 60th minute, Gygax substituted out injured.

13 July 2002 Second leg	Levadia (Estonia)	0–0 (0–1 agg.)	(Switzerland) Zürich	Kadriorg Stadium, Tallinn
		FCZ summary	(yellow card) 36' Keller; (yellow card) 55' Chihab	Attendance: 1,200; Referee: Drago Kos (Slovenia)
Note: By Levadia assistant coach Tuukkanen stood in for the absent head-coach Pasi Rautiainen.

Zürich won 1–0 on aggregate.

==== Third round ====
20 July 2002 First leg	Zürich (Switzerland)	2–0	(England) Aston Villa	Hardturm, Zürich
	Keita 32' (1:0); Keller (yellow card) 37'; Yasar (yellow card) 65'; Yasar 83' (2:0); Yasar (yellow card) (yellow-red card) 84'	FCZ summary	(yellow card) 45'	Attendance: 4,560; Referee: Florian Meyer (Germany)
Note: The Letzigrund was occupied by a Jehovah's Witnesses event.

27 July 2002 Second leg	Aston Villa (England)	3–0 (3–2 agg.)	(Switzerland) Zürich	Villa Park, Birmingham
	Boulding 33' (1:0); Allbäck 52' (2:0); Staunton 77' (3:0)	FCZ summary		Attendance: 18,349; Referee: Roberto Rosetti (Italy)
Note: Villa without Samuel (susoended). FCZ without Yasar (susoended).

Aston Villa won 3–2 on aggregate.

=== Friendly matches ===
==== Pre-season ====
3 June 2002 Exhibition game	Wil	1–4	Zürich	Necker SG
	31' (1:1)	FCZ summary	30' (0:1) Yasar; 65' (1:2) Keita; 74' (1:3) Keita; 82' (1:4) Keita	Attendance: 1,000

4 June 2002 Exhibition game	FC Wollishofen	0–14	Zürich	Sportplatz Sonnau, Zürich
		FCZ summary	(0:1) Akalé (0:2) Keita (0:3) Gygax (0:4) Hohl (0:5) Fischer (0:6) Yasar
Note: 50th anniversary of FC Wollishofen. For FCZ, every squad player (with the exception of Stephan Keller) saw action.

6 June 2002 Exhibition game	Zürich	3–0	Kriens	Thalwil
	Yasar 28' (1:0); Raimondi 60' (2:0); Raimondi 70' (3:0)	FCZ summary		Attendance: 800

12 June 2002 Exhibition game	Zürich	3–0	Winterthur	Sportplatz Schürwies, Egg, Switzerland
	Iodice 50' (pen.); Yasar 65' (2:0); Schneider 70' (3:0)	FCZ summary

16 June 2002 Exhibition game	Aarau	2–2	Zürich	Sportplatz Stampfi, Rothrist
	de Napoli 18' (1:0); Page 88' (2:2)	FCZ summary	52' (pen. 1:1) Hellinga; 69' (1:2) Isibor	Attendance: 500; Referee: (Switzerland) Martin Salm (Veltheim, Aargau)

19 June 2002 Exhibition game	Young Boys	2–2	Zürich	Schwanden bei Brienz
	Magnin 40' (1:1); Petrosyan 50' (2:0)	FCZ summary	75' (2:1) Yasar; 90' (2:2) Keita

4 September 2002 Mid-season	FC Wohlen	2–2	Zürich	Paul-Walser-Stiftung, Wohlen, Aargau
	Goal	FCZ summary	(0:1) Jefferson (0:2) Blunschi
Note: FCZ with test-player Stefan Blunschi who later signed with Baden.

==== Winter break ====
19 January 2003 Exhibition game	Wil	0–3	Zürich	Stadion Bergholz, Wil
		FCZ summary	(0:1) Yasar (0:2) Yasar (0:3) Di Jorio	Attendance: 500

21 January 2003 Exhibition game	Aarau	3–2	Zürich	Stadion Brügglifeld, Aarau
	Bühler (pen.); Bieli (2:0); Pogatetz (3:0)	FCZ summary	46' (pen.) Iodice (3:2) Tarone

26 January 2003 Exhibition game	Lugano	3–1	Zürich	Gavirate, Italy
	Njanke (1:0); Urdaneta (2:0); Herrera (3:0)	FCZ summary	(3:1) Tarone
Note: FCZ without Keita (he had no visa for Italy)

8 February 2003 Exhibition game	Zürich	2–3	Austria Wien	Letzigrund, Zürich
	Guerrero 52' (1:2); Bastida 82' (2:3)	FCZ summary	2' (0:1) Rushfeldt; 22' (0:2) Flögel; 53' (1:3) Rushfeldt	Attendance: Marbella
Note: 25th minute, Nef is forced to leave the game after sustaining a gash above one eye.

11 February 2003 Exhibition game	FC Andalucia	1–3	Zürich	Marbella
	(1:3)	FCZ summary	(0:1) Yasar (0:2) Guerrero (pen. 0:3) Bastida

15 February 2003 Exhibition game	Basel	0–3	Zürich	Stadion Rankhof, Basel
14:30		FCB summary FCZ sunnary	42' (0:1) Bastida; 70' (0:2) Yasar; 74' (0:3) Guerrero	Attendance: 2,000; Referee: (Switzerland) Nicole Petignat (Courgenay)
Note: FCB without Quennoz, Esposito and Ergic (all injured). FCZ without König (Slovakia national team), Nef, Pallas, and Keller (all injured). 46th minute: Tactical change by FCB, Barberis moved to right-back following Varela’s substitution; Varela played in right midfield. 75th minute: Degen played in right midfield after coming on and FCB switched to a 4-4-1-1 formation. 78th minute: Yasar left the pitch with a foot injury following a foul by M. Yakin.

19 February 2003 Exhibition game	Zürich	1–1	Austria Lustenau	Unterägeri
	Bastida 18' (1:0)	FCZ summary	36' (1:1) Vujic

22 February 2003 Exhibition game	Lausanne-Sport	3–3	Zürich	Olympique de la Pontaise, Lausanne
	Margairaz (1:2); Margairaz (2:2); Shizo (3:3)	FCZ summary	(0:1) Keita (0:2) Gygax (2:3) Keita	Attendance: 200

1 March 2003 Exhibition game	Zürich	8–2	FC Wangen bei Olten	Trainings pitch, Letzigrund, Zürich
	8' (o.g.); Keita; Keita; Bastida; Bastida; Gygax; Gygax; Guerrero	FCZ summary	Goal
Note: Match played at very short notice and organised because the championship game at the Charmilles Stadium Geneva against Servette was postponed.

== Sources ==
- dbFCZ Homepage
- Switzerland 2002–03 at RSSSF

Preceded by 2001–02	FC Zürich seasons	Succeeded by 2003–04
