= 2001–02 FC Zürich season =

FC Zürich
2001–02 season
- Owner: Sven Hotz
- Club president: Sven Hotz
- Head-coach: Georges Bregy
- Ground: Letzigrund
- 2001–02 NLA Qualification round: 8th of 12
- Championship round: 5th of 8
- 2001–02 Swiss Cup: Quarter-final
- Top goalscorer: League: Mikheil Kavelashvili (12); All: Mikheil Kavelashvili (13)

The 2001–02 season was FC Zürich's 105th season in their existence, since their foundation in 1896. It was their twelfth consecutive season in the top flight of Swiss football, following their promotion at the end of the 1989–90 season.

== Overview ==
The local businessman and property dealer Sven Hotz was the club's chairman and patron at this time. He had taken over as club president at the AGM in 1986. The contract with last season's head-coach Gilbert Gress was not prolonged and he left the club. Hotz appointed Georges Bregy as new FCZ manager for the 2001–02 season. The previous two season, Bregy was manager for second-tier Thun. FCZ played their home games in the Letzigrund, a stadium also used by the athletics club LC Zürich. The stadium originally opened in 1925, was partially rebuilt in 1973 and was modernised during the mid-90's. The stadium is located in the west of Zurich in the district of Altstetten, which is about three kilometers from the city center.

The FCZ first team competed in this years domestic first-tier 2001–02 Nationalliga A with the clear intention of retaining their top level status and reaching the championship group for the second half of the season. Which meant the team had to reach at least eighth position at the end of the qualification round. A further aim was to reach a top three position, so that they would qualify for a UEFA European competition. The team also competed in 2001–02 Swiss Cup. The team had not qualified for any of the UEFA European tournaments and they did not enter the 2001 Intertoto Cup.

== Players ==
The following is the list of the FCZ first team squad this season. It also includes players that were in the squad the day the domestic league season started, on 4 July 2001, but subsequently left the club after that date.

Note: Flags indicate national team as defined under FIFA eligibility rules; some limited exceptions apply. Players may hold more than one non-FIFA nationality.

No.	Pos.	Nation	Player
—	GK	SUI	Marco Pascolo (league games: 35)
—	GK	SUI	Davide Taini (league games: 1)
—	DF	MAR	Tariq Chihab (league games: 26)
—	DF	SUI	Urs Fischer (league games: 27)
—	DF	ITA	Mauro Giannini (league games: 18)
—	DF	NED	Wilco Hellinga (league games: 25)
—	DF	SUI	Stephan Keller (league games: 13)
—	DF	SUI	Sébastien Jeanneret (league games: 7)
—	DF	SUI	Alain Nef (league games: 11)
—	DF	SUI	David Pallas (league games: 29)
—	DF	SUI	Yvan Quentin (league games: 27)
—	DF	LIE	Martin Stocklasa (league games: 17)
—	MF	CIV	Kanga Akalé (league games: 28)
—	MF	SUI	Patrick Baumann (league games: 26)
—	MF	SUI	Patrick Bühlmann (league games: 17)

No.	Pos.	Nation	Player
—	MF	SUI	Sandro Burki (league games: 7)
—	MF	SUI	Philippe Douglas (league games: 11)
—	MF	SUI	Daniel Gygax (league games: 4)
—	MF	SUI	Marcel Heldmann (league games: 15)
—	MF	ITA	Luca Iodice (league games: 8)
—	MF	GEO	Gocha Jamarauli (league games: 19)
—	MF	SUI	Adnan Jashari (league games: 2)
—	MF	SUI	Feliciano Magro (league games: 31)
—	MF	SUI	Vural Oenen (league games: 6)
—	FW	SUI	Frédéric Chassot (league games: 23)
—	FW	ARG	Francisco Guerrero (league games: 19)
—	FW	GEO	Mikheil Kavelashvili (league games: 27)
—	FW	GUI	Alhassane Keita (league games: 8)
—	FW	SUI	Pascal Renfer (league games: 10)
—	FW	SUI	Ursal Yasar (league games: 14)

Players who joined the squadto

The following is the list of players that joined the FCZ first team squad in the off or pre-season or during the winter-break transfer window. It also includes players that advanced from the youth team during the season and achieved at least one domestic league appearance.

Note: Flags indicate national team as defined under FIFA eligibility rules; some limited exceptions apply. Players may hold more than one non-FIFA nationality.

No.	Pos.	Nation	Player
—	MF	SUI	Sandro Burki (advanced from youth team)
—	MF	SUI	Daniel Gygax (from Aarau)
—	MF	ITA	Luca Iodice (from Baden)
—	DF	SUI	Stephan Keller (from Kriens)

No.	Pos.	Nation	Player
—	MF	SUI	Feliciano Magro (in on loan from Udinese)
—	DF	SUI	Alain Nef (advanced from youth team)
—	FW	SUI	Pascal Renfer (from Winterthur)
—	GK	SUI	Davide Taini (from Winterthur)

Players who left the squad

The following is the list of the FCZ first team players that left the squad, either during the previous season or in the off-season, before the new domestic season began.

Note: Flags indicate national team as defined under FIFA eligibility rules; some limited exceptions apply. Players may hold more than one non-FIFA nationality.

No.	Pos.	Nation	Player
—	GK	ITA	Christian Trombini (to ASD Riccione 1929)
—	GK	SUI	Fabien Margairaz (to Zug 94)
—	DF	SUI	Thierry Bonalair (retired)
—	DF	FRA	Alain Gaspoz (to Lugano)
—	DF	SUI	Pascal Castillo (to Winterthur)
—	DF	ITA	Giorgio Del Signore (to Athlitikos Omilos Egaleo)
—	DF	SRB	Aleksandar Đorđević (to KÍ)

No.	Pos.	Nation	Player
—	DF	SEN	Saidou Kébé (to Delémont)
—	DF	COD	David Opango (to Aarau)
—	MF	LIE	Mario Frick (to Arezzo)
—	MF	BRA	Renato (reserves)
—	FW	RSA	Shaun Bartlett (on loan to Charlton Athletic)
—	FW	SUI	Mahir Cayir (to Luzern)
—	FW	RHO	Adam Ndlovu (to Highlanders)

== Results ==
Legend

Win Draw Loss Postponed

=== Nationalliga A ===
==== Qualification phase ====
The Qualification Round to the League season 2001–02 was contested by twelve teams. The first eight teams of the regular season (or Qualification) were then to compete in the Championship Playoff Round. The teams in ninth to twelfth position completed with the top four teams of the Nationalliga B in a Nationalliga A/B Playoff round. The first stage of the NLA began on Wednesday 4 July 2001 with the first two matches and was completed on Sunday 9 December.

7 July 2001 Round 1	Servette	0–2	Zürich	Charmilles Stadium, Geneva
19:30	Fournier (yellow card) 76'	FCZ summary	6' (0:1) Kavelashvili; (yellow card) 12' Magro; (yellow card) 16' Jeanneret; (yellow card) 28' Quentin; (yellow card) 59' Hellinga; 89' (0:2) Chassot	Attendance: 3,578; Referee: (Switzerland) Reto Rutz (Amriswil)

14 July 2001 Round 2	Zürich	3–2	St. Gallen	Letzigrund, Zürich
20:15	Chassot 28' (1:1); Giannini (yellow card) 29'; Chassot (yellow card) 45'; Kavelashvili 47' (2:1); Kavelashvili 49' (3:1); Jamarauli (yellow card) 88'	FCZ summary	22' (0:1) Batista; (yellow card) 48' Imhof; 53' (3:2) Dal Santo; (yellow card) 61' Guido; (yellow card) 90+3' Müller	Attendance: 8,300; Referee: (Switzerland) Urs Meier (Wettingen and Würenlos)

18 July 2001 Round 3	Lausanne-Sport	1–1	Zürich	Olympique de la Pontaise, Lausanne
19:30	Kuźba (yellow card) 48'; Meyer 50' (1:1)	FCZ summary	14' (0:1) Kavelashvili; (yellow card) 58' Bühlmann; (yellow card) 68' Baumann	Attendance: 2,050; Referee: (Liechtenstein) Roland Beck (Triesenberg)

22 July 2001 Round 4	Young Boys	1–1	Zürich	Wankdorf Stadium, Bern
16:15	Berisha 7' (1:0); Vardanyan (yellow card) 76'; Häberli (yellow card) 78'	FCZ summary	(yellow card) 10' Jamarauli; (yellow card) 35' Fischer; 37' (1:1) Pallas; (yellow card) 64' Heldmann	Attendance: 9,000; Referee: (Switzerland) Nicole Petignat (Courgenay)
Note: FCZ without Guerrero and Keita (both lacking match permits).

28 July 2001 Round 5	Zürich	2–0	Basel	Letzigrund, Zürich
17:15	Kavelashvili 31' (1:0) (Quennoz) 83' (o.g. 2:0)	FCB summary FCZ summary	(yellow card) 45' Varela; (yellow card) 80' M. Yakin	Attendance: 12,500; Referee: (Switzerland) Florian Etter
Note: FCZ without Opango, Renato, Oenen, Jeanneret and Quentin (all injured), as well as Guerrero and Keita (both lacking match permits). FCB without Hakan Yakin (suspended), Koumantarakis and Savic (both injured). 57th minute: a shot from Pallas hit the post. 58th minute: Kreuzer cleared a shot from Kawelashvili off the line. 76th minute, a header from Tum hit the post. 89th minute: FCB goalkepper Pascal Zuberbühler pushed a shot from Giannini onto the post.

4 August 2001 Round 6	Aarau	2–3	Zürich	Stadion Brügglifeld, Aarau
17:30	Okpala (yellow card) 84'; Okpala 87' (1:3); Okpala 89' (2:3)	FCZ summary FCA summary	31' (0:1) Kavelashvili; (yellow card) 33' Hellinga; (yellow card) 44' Jamarauli; 46' (0:2) Jamarauli; 48' (0:3) Chassot; (yellow card) 62' Quentin	Attendance: 6,200; Referee: (Switzerland) Philippe Leuba (Chexbres)

11 August 2001 Round 7	Zürich	1–1	Xamax	Letzigrund, Zürich
19:30	Kavelashvili 11' (1:0); Chassot (yellow card) 90+1'; Kavelashvili (red card) 90+1'	FCZ summary	15' (1:1) Tachie-Mensah; (yellow card) 67' Oppliger	Attendance: 6,900; Referee: (Switzerland) Markus Nobs (Wohlen bei Bern)

19 August 2001 Round 8	Lugano	A–A	Zürich	Cornaredo, Lugano
14:30		[FCZ summary]		Referee: (Liechtenstein) Roland Beck (Triesenberg)
Note: Match abandoned at half time due to heavy rainfall

21 August 2001 Round 8	Lugano	1–1	Zürich	Cornaredo, Lugano
19:30	Biaggi (yellow card) 19'; Zagorčić (yellow card) 55'; Bullo (yellow card) 72'; Magnin 85' (1:1)	FCZ summary	(yellow card) 12' Pallas; 41' (0:1) Chihab; (yellow card) 52' Guerrero; (yellow card) 86' Giannini; (yellow card) 90+1' Quentin	Attendance: 6,300; Referee: (Liechtenstein) Roland Beck (Triesenberg)
Note: The first staging of this match was abandoned at half-time the previous Sunday due to heavy rain showers. FCZ without Kavelashvili (suspended).

25 August 2001 Round 9	Zürich	1–3	Grasshopper Club	Letzigrund, Zürich
17:15	Quentin (red card) 39'; Chassot 59' (1:1); Fischer (red card) 74'	FCZ summary	11' (0:1) Núñez; (yellow card) 36' Chapuisat; (yellow card) 45' Schwegler; 72' (1:2) Chapuisat; 79' (1:3) Ippoliti	Attendance: 14,200; Referee: (Switzerland) Reto Rutz (Amriswil)

8 September 2001 Round 10	Luzern	3–0	Zürich	Stadion Allmend, Luzern
19:30	Varela 28' (1:0); Wyss (yellow card) 47'; Varela 71' (2:0); Türkyilmaz 88' (3:0)	FCZ summary	(yellow card) 25' Pallas; (red card) 79' Kavelashvili; (yellow card) 80' Chassot	Attendance: 3,150; Referee: (Switzerland) Dieter Schoch (Attiswil)
Note: FCZ without Quentin and Fischer (both suspended). 35th minute, Heldmann substituted out injured.

15 September 2001 Round 11	Zürich	0–0	Sion	Letzigrund, Zürich
16:45	Stocklasa (yellow card) 64'	FCZ summary	(yellow card) 79' Moreira	Attendance: 3,300; Referee: (Switzerland) Markus Nobs (Wohlen bei Bern)
Note: FCZ without Kavelashvili (suspended).

23 September 2001 Round 12	Zürich	0–3	Servette	Letzigrund, Zürich
16:15		FCZ summary	18' (0:1) Comisetti; 30' (0:2) Oruma; 53' (0:3) Dill	Attendance: 4,800; Referee: (Liechtenstein) Roland Beck (Triesenberg)
Note: Fair game, no cautions.

30 September 2001 Round 13	St. Gallen	3–1	Zürich	Espenmoos, St. Gallen
16:15	Guido 7' (1:0); Batista (yellow card) 42'; Mokoena (yellow card) 47'; Zanni 46' (2:1); Zellweger (yellow card) 77'; Gane 90+1' (3:1)	FCZ summary	12' (1:1) Kavelashvili; (yellow card) 38' Kavelashvili; (yellow card) 57' Hellinga	Attendance: 11,300; Referee: (Switzerland) Guido Wildhaber (Kerzers)

10 October 2001 Round 14	Zürich	1–0	Lausanne-Sport	Letzigrund, Zürich
19:30	Baumann (yellow card) 3'; Jamarauli (yellow card) 31'; Fischer (yellow card) 67'; Kavelashvili 68' (1:0); Quentin (yellow card) 86'	FCZ summary	(yellow card) 12' Lutsenko; (yellow card) 37' Karlen	Attendance: 3,500; Referee: (Switzerland) Claudio Circhetta (Muttenz)

14 October 2001 Round 15	Zürich	0–0	Young Boys	Letzigrund, Zürich
16:15	Heldmann (yellow card) 31'; Chassot (yellow card) 75'	FCZ summary	(yellow card) 24' Mitreski; (yellow card) 42' Eugster	Attendance: 7,750; Referee: (Switzerland) Massimo Busacca (Monte Carasso/Bellinzona)

20 October 2001 Round 16	Basel	2–1	Zürich	St. Jakob-Park, Basel
16:45	H. Yakin 51' (1:1); Ergić 59' (2:1); Huggel (yellow card) 88'	FCB summary FCZ summary	37' (0:1) Guerrero; (yellow card) 39' Fischer; (yellow card) 65' Heldmann; (yellow card) 81' Keita	Attendance: 28,481; Referee: (Switzerland) Urs Meier (Wettingen and Würenlos)
Note: FCB without Varela (suspended) and Ceccaroni, Tum and Savic (all injured). FCZ without Chassot and Kawelaschwili (both suspended) and Chihab, Jeanneret and Renato (all injured). NLA debut for Keita.

28 October 2001 Round 17	Zürich	1–0	Aarau	Letzigrund, Zürich
16:15	Magro 29' (1:0)	FCZ summary FCA summary	(yellow card) 86' de Napoli	Attendance: 8,600; Referee: (Switzerland) Dieter Schoch (Attiswil)

4 November 2001 Round 18	Xamax	1–1	Zürich	Stade de la Maladière, Neuchâtel
16:15	Tachie-Mensah 72' (1:1); Diop (yellow card) 83'	FCZ summary	51' (0:1) Guerrero; (yellow card) 69' Magro; (yellow card) 90+2' Hellinga	Attendance: 3,900; Referee: (Liechtenstein) Roland Beck (Triesenberg)

18 November 2001 Round 19	Zürich	2–3	Lugano	Letzigrund, Zürich
16:15	Kavelashvili 16' (1:1); Guerrero (yellow card) 52'; Baumann (yellow card) 55'; Quentin 61' (2:3); Kavelashvili (yellow card) 74'	FCZ summary	13' (0:1) Rossi; (penalty missed) 38′ Bastida; 38' (1:2) Bastida; (yellow card) 39' Sutter; (yellow card) 34' (yellow-red card) 59' Magnin; 45' (1:3) Rossi; (yellow card) 77' Caíco; (yellow card) 80' Moresi; (yellow card) 86' Razzetti	Attendance: 4,900; Referee: (Switzerland) Jean-Luc Schmid
Note: 18th minute, Gaspoz was substituted out injured. 38th minute, FCZ goalkeeper Marco Pascolo saved the penalty kick from Bastida, who then scored from the rebound.

25 November 2001 Round 20	Grasshopper Club	0–0	Zürich	Hardturm, Zürich
16:15	Castillo (yellow card) 45'; Tararache (yellow card) 76' (yellow-red card) 81'	FCZ summary	(yellow card) 29' Jamarauli; (yellow card) 45' Guerrero; (yellow card) 87' Heldmann	Attendance: 11,800; Referee: (Switzerland) Andreas Schluchter (Schönenbuch)
Note: 82nd minute, Bühlmann substituted out injured.

1 December 2001 Round 21	Zürich	1–1	Luzern	Letzigrund, Zürich
16:15	Magro 28' (1:0); Jamarauli (yellow card) 35'; Magro (yellow card) 39'; Chihab (yellow card) 90+1'	FCZ summary	(yellow card) 33' Meier; (yellow card) 38' (yellow-red card) 73' Koch; (yellow card) 40' Zukic; 47' (1:1) Urdaneta; (yellow card) 88' Gagliardi	Attendance: 3,900; Referee: (Austria) Stefan Messner
Note: This match was played as part of the interaction referee exchange between the Swiss Football Association and the Austrian Football Association.

9 December 2001 Round 22	Sion	0–1	Zürich	Stade Tourbillon, Sion
14:30	Tcheutchoua (yellow card) 65'	FCZ summary	(yellow card) 62' Chihab; (yellow card) 81' Chassot; 86' (0:1) Magro	Attendance: 6,800; Referee: (Switzerland) Guido Wildhaber (Kerzers)

==== League table qualification ====
Pos	Team	Pld	W	D	L	GF	GA	GD	Pts	Qualification
1	Basel	22	13	4	5	52	37	+15	43	Advance to championship round halved points (rounded up) as bonus
2	Lugano	22	11	5	6	39	33	+6	38	Advance to championship round halved points (rounded up) as bonus
3	Grasshopper Club	22	11	4	7	50	33	+17	37	Advance to championship round halved points (rounded up) as bonus
4	St. Gallen	22	9	8	5	38	32	+6	35	Advance to championship round halved points (rounded up) as bonus
5	Servette	22	9	7	6	36	29	+7	34	Advance to championship round halved points (rounded up) as bonus
6	Sion	22	10	3	9	40	29	+11	33	Advance to championship round halved points (rounded up) as bonus
7	Young Boys	22	8	7	7	35	28	+7	31	Advance to championship round halved points (rounded up) as bonus
8	Zürich	22	7	9	6	24	27	−3	30	Advance to championship round halved points (rounded up) as bonus
9	Aarau	22	7	6	9	28	25	+3	27	Continue to promotion/relegation round
10	Xamax	22	6	7	9	28	36	−8	25	Continue to promotion/relegation round
11	Lausanne-Sport	22	4	4	14	24	49	−25	16	Continue to promotion/relegation round
12	Luzern	22	3	4	15	23	59	−36	13	Continue to promotion/relegation round

Source: RSSSF
Rules for classification: 1) points; 2) goal difference; 3) number of goals scored.

==== Championship Playoff Round ====
The first eight teams of the regular season (or qualification) competed in the championship playoff round. They took half of the points (rounded up to complete units) gained in the qualification as bonus with them. The championship round began on 24 February 2002 was completed on 8 May.

24 February 2002 Round 1	Zürich	0–2	Servette	Letzigrund, Zürich
16:15	Magro (yellow card) 10'; Jeanneret (yellow card) 36'	FCZ summary	(yellow card) 28' Miéville; 33' (0:1) Frei; 67' (0:2) Frei	Attendance: 4,000; Referee: (Switzerland) Philippe Leuba (Chexbres)

2 March 2002 Round 2	Basel	1–0	Zürich	St. Jakob-Park, Basel
16:45	Koumantarakis 61' (1:0); Quennoz (yellow card) 78'; H. Yakin (yellow card) 79'	FCB summary FCZ summary	(yellow card) 9' Keller; (yellow card) 27' Burki; (yellow card) 31' Hellinga; (yellow card) 55' Guerrero	Attendance: 25,871; Referee: (Switzerland) Massimo Busacca (Monte Carasso/Bellinzona)
Note: FCB without Varela (suspended), Huggel and Ceccaroni (both injured). FCZ without Magro and Iodice (both suspended), Kawelashvili, Gygax, Milicevic and Oenen (all injured), Jamarauli and Bühlmann (not in the squad). Tactical change by FCB, Hakan Yakin in attack following Gimenez's substitution and Quennoz replaced Barberis in defense.

6 March 2002 Round 3	Zürich	2–1	Sion	Letzigrund, Zürich
19:30	Magro 5' (pen.); Yasar 26' (2:1); (yellow card) 40' Baumann; Quentin (yellow card) 79'	FCZ summary	(yellow card) 9' Ekobo; 12' (1:1) Piffaretti; (yellow card) 84' Tcheutchoua	Attendance: 3,100; Referee: (Liechtenstein) Roland Beck (Triesenberg)

9 March 2002 Round 4	Grasshopper Club	3–0	Zürich	Hardturm, Zürich
16:45	Hodel 40' (1:0); Chapuisat 44' (2:0); Cabanas (yellow card) 60'; Eduardo 63' (3:0); Tararache (yellow card) 84'	FCZ summary	(yellow card) 29' Magro	Attendance: 9,400; Referee: (Switzerland) Urs Meier (Wettingen and Würenlos)

16 March 2002 Round 5	Zürich	1–0	St. Gallen	Letzigrund, Zürich
16:45	Kavelashvili 24' (1:0); Jeanneret (yellow card) 40'; Keller (yellow card) 64'	FCZ summary	(yellow card) 27' Di Jorio; (yellow card) 53' Batista; (yellow card) 88' Winkler	Attendance: 5,900; Referee: (Switzerland) Dieter Schoch (Attiswil)

24 March 2002 Round 6	Young Boys	3–2	Zürich	Wankdorf Stadium, Bern
14:30	Sermeter (yellow card) 4'; Tikva 13' (1:0); Sermeter 28' (pen.); Eugster (yellow card) 54'; Eseosa (yellow card) 59'; Petrosyan 66' (3:0)	FCZ summary	(yellow card) 49' Magro; (yellow card) 81' Kavelashvili; 88' (3:1) Chassot; 90+3' (3:2) Yasar	Attendance: 9,300; Referee: (Switzerland) Reto Rutz (Amriswil)

30 March 2002 Round 7	Lugano	2–0	Zürich	Cornaredo, Lugano
19:30	Biaggi 33' (1:0); Gaspoz (yellow card) 55'; Rossi 69' (2:0)	FCZ summary		Attendance: 3,00; Referee: (Switzerland) Martin Salm

7 April 2002 Round 8	Zürich	0–2	Lugano	Letzigrund, Zürich
16:15	Magro (yellow card) 34'; Baumann (yellow card) 41'	FCZ summary	19' (0:1) Rossi; (yellow card) 25' Shala; (yellow card) 56' Morf; 90+1' (0:2) Rossi	Attendance: 2,900; Referee: (Austria) Dietmar Drabek
Note: This match was played as part of the interaction referee exchange between the Swiss Football Association and the Austrian Football Association.

14 April 2002 Round 9	Zürich	2–0	Young Boys	Letzigrund, Zürich
16:15	Baumann (yellow card) 41'; Yasar 45' (1:0); Yasar 59' (2:0)	FCZ summary	(yellow card) 37' Häberli	Attendance: 3,500; Referee: (Liechtenstein) Roland Beck (Triesenberg)

20 April 2002 Round 10	St. Gallen	0–1	Zürich	Espenmoos, St. Gallen
17:30	Imhof (yellow card) 37'; Di Jorio (yellow card) 79'	FCZ summary	(yellow card) 15' Quentin; (yellow card) 27' Kavelashvili; (yellow card) 43' Akalé; 75' (0:1) Keita; (yellow card) 88' Keller; (yellow card) 90' Magro	Attendance: 9,500; Referee: (Switzerland) Florian Etter

25 April 2002 Round 11	Zürich	1–1	Grasshopper Club	Letzigrund, Zürich
19:30	Yasar (yellow card) 29'; Iodice (yellow card) 36'; Iodice 52' (1:1); Keita (yellow card) 64'	FCZ summary	38' (0:1) Chapuisat	Attendance: 7,800; Referee: (Switzerland) Urs Meier (Wettingen and Würenlos)

28 April 2002 Round 12	Sion	1–1	Zürich	Stade Tourbillon, Sion
16:15	Ekobo 87' (1:0)	FCZ summary	90+3' (1:1) Chihab	Attendance: 2,600; Referee: (Switzerland) Claudio Circhetta (Muttenz)
Note: FCZ without Guerrero, Hellinga, Jeanneret, Milicevic and Renato (all injured). Fair game, no cautions given.

4 May 2002 Round 13	Zürich	3–1	Basel	Letzigrund, Zürich
18:00	Kavelashvili 9' (1:0); Keller (yellow card) 26'; Pallas (yellow card) 32'; Kavelashvili (yellow card) 54'; Akalé 82' (2:1); Magro (yellow card) 83'; Keita 84' (3:1); Gygax (red card) 87'	FCB summary FCZ summary	(yellow card) 19' Cantaluppi; 33' (1:1) Barberis; (yellow card) 55'Savić	Attendance: 8,200; Referee: (Switzerland) Dieter Schoch (Attiswil)
Note: FCZ without Guerrero, Hellinga, Jeanneret, Milicevic and Renato (all injured). FCB without Gimenez, Chipperfield and Huggel (all injured). 46th minute: a shot by Hakan Yakin hit the angle of the crossbar and post.

8 May 2002 Round 14	Servette	0–1	Zürich	Charmilles Stadium, Geneva
20:15	Michkov (yellow card) 74'	FCZ summary	7' (0:1) Yasar	Attendance: 3,816; Referee: (Switzerland) Reto Rutz (Amriswil)
Note: All matches in this round kicked off at the same time. FCZ without Guerrero, Hellinga, Jeanneret, Milicevic and Renato (all injured).

==== Final league table ====
The first eight teams of the regular season (or Qualification) competed in the Championship Playoff Round. They took half of the points (rounded up to complete units) gained in the Qualification as Bonus with them.

Pos	Team	Pld	W	D	L	GF	GA	GD	BP	Pts	Qualification or relegation
1	Basel	14	11	0	3	36	16	+20	22	55	Swiss champions and Cup winners qualified for Champions League third qualifying round
2	Grasshopper Club	14	7	5	2	28	17	+11	19	45	qualified for UEFA Cup first round
3	Lugano (Note: Both Lugano and Sion did not obtain a top-tier license for the 2002/03 season. Nor did Lausanne-Sport. All three clubs are relegated to next season's NLB and their NLA places filled by Aarau, Delémont and Luzern.) (R)	14	7	2	5	23	19	+4	19	42	qualified for UEFA Cup qualifying round
4	Servette	14	6	3	5	25	23	+2	17	38	qualified for UEFA Cup qualifying round
5	Zürich	14	6	2	6	14	17	−3	15	35	entered Intertoto Cup first round
6	St. Gallen	14	4	4	6	18	20	−2	18	34	entered Intertoto Cup first round
7	Young Boys	14	4	3	7	18	25	−7	16	31	
8	Sion (R)	14	1	1	12	10	35	−25	17	21	

Source: RSSSF
Rules for classification: 1) points; 2) Position in the qualification.
(R) Relegated

=== Swiss Cup ===
This season's Swiss Cup was the 77th season of Switzerland's cup competition held annually by the Swiss Football Association (SFV-ASF). The competition began on 10 August with the first games of Round 1 and ended on 12 May 2002 with the Final held at St. Jakob-Park, Basel. The cup winners were qualified for the first round of the UEFA Cup. The twelve first-tier clubs from the 2001–02 Nationalliga A had been granted byes for the first four rounds and they joined the competition in the fifth round. Here they were seeded and cound not be drawn against each other. The draw respected regionalities, when possible, and the lower classed team was granted home advantage.

10 November 2001 Round 5	Schötz	0–3	Zürich	Sportplatz Wissenhusen, Kilchmatte, Schötz
16:00		FCZ summary	44' (0:1) Kavelachvili; 63' (0:2) Guerrero; 78' (pen.) Guerrero	Attendance: 2,000; Referee: (Switzerland) Carlo Bertolini (Vira-Gambarogno)
Note: 30th minute: a shot from Heldmann hit the crossbar. 36th minute: a goal by Hellinga was goal disallowed due to a foul.

17 February 2002 Round 6	FC Schaffhausen	0–3 (a.e.t.)	Zürich	Stadion Breite, Schaffhausen
14:30	Rohrer (yellow card) 11'; Toco (yellow card) 23'; Fehr (yellow card) 62' (yellow-red card) 86'; Colantonio (yellow card) 108'	FCZ summary	(yellow card) 27' Magro; (red card) 63' Iodice; (yellow card) 107' Keller; 100' (0:1) Hellinga; 115' (0:2) Hellinga; 117' (0:3) Guerrero	Attendance: 2,050; Referee: (Switzerland) Martin Salm (Veltheim, Aargau)
Note: FC Schaffhausen played the 2001/02 season in the 1. Liga (third-tier).

21 March 2002 Quarter-final	Zürich	1–4	Basel	Letzigrund, Zürich
19:30	Akalé 24' (1:1); Iodice (yellow card) 45'; Chassot (yellow card) 47'; Akalé (yellow card) 36' (yellow-red card) 88'	FCB summary FCZ summary	17' (0:1) Koumantarakis; (yellow card) 24' Koumantarakis; 44' (1:2) Ergić; 84' (1:3) Varela; 87' (1:4) Chipperfield	Attendance: 6,800; Referee: (Switzerland) Guido Wildhaber (Kerzers)
Note: FCZ without Guerrero, Gygax, Milicevic, and Oenen (all injured). FCB without Cravero, Ceccaroni, and Huggel (all injured). 87th minute: a shot from Tum hit the post, then Chipperfield converted the rebound.

=== Friendly matches ===
==== Pre- and mid-season ====
26 June 2001 Exhibition game	Zürich	3–2	Winterthur	Eselriet, Effretikon
	Chassot 20' (1:0); Kavelashvili 62' (pen.); Heldmann 88' (3:2)	FCZ summary	49' (1:1) Bihombele; 79' (2:2) Gerstenmájer

26 June 2001 Exhibition game	Zürich	1–0	São Paulo Selection	Sportplatz Buchholz, Uster
	Yasar 20' (1:0)	FCZ summary		Attendance: 1,000
Note: The team was a selection of players from São Paulo and not all players played for São Paulo FC.

27 June 2001 Exhibition game	Kriens	0–2	Zürich	Sportplatz Chämsmatt, Rothenburg
		FCZ summary	43' (0:1) Keita; 82' (0:2) Douglas	Attendance: 300; Referee: (Switzerland) Bleuler (Grasshopper Club)

30 June 2001 Exhibition game	Zürich	1–1	Wil	Sportplatz Buchlern, Zürich
	Akalé 48' (1:1)	FCZ summary	38' (0:1) Sawu	Attendance: 1,400; Referee: (Switzerland) Urs Meier (Wettingen and Würenlos)

3 July 2001 Exhibition game	Zürich	2–1	Dinamo Zagreb	Le Mouret in France
	Kavelashvili 28' (1:0); Magro 60' (2:0)	FCZ summary	90' (2:1) Kranjčar

25 July 2001 Exhibition game	Zürich	1–0	Espérance Tunis	Sportplatz, Weinfelden
	Akalé 28' (1:0)	FCZ summary		Attendance: 250; Referee: (Switzerland) Claudio Circhetta (Muttenz)

31 July 2001 Exhibition game	Zürich	0–6	Hapoel Petah Tikva	Sportplatz, Weinfelden
		FCZ summary	Goal

23 September 2001 Mid-season; Exhibition game	Zürich	1–1	Algeria	Letzigrund, Zürich
	Guerrero (1:0)	FCZ summary	Goal
Note: Played behind closed doors.

5 October 2001 Mid-season; Exhibition game	Karlsruher SC	3–0	Zürich	Sportplatz, Kehl, Germany
	Graf 1' (1:0); Graf 30' (2:0); 54' (pen.)	FCZ summary		Attendance: 250

==== Winter break ====
12 January 2002 Exhibition game	Zürich	3–0	Baden	Letzigrund, Zürich
	Chassot 32' (1:0); Yasar 80' (2:0); Nef 85' (3:0)	FCZ summary		Attendance: 250; Referee: (Switzerland) René Rogalla (Wallisellen)

15 January 2002 Exhibition game	Thun	0–0	Zürich	Stadion Lachen, Thun
		FCZ summary		Referee: (Liechtenstein) Roland Beck (Triesenberg)

24 January 2002 Exhibition game	Inter Playa del Carmen	0–8	Zürich	Playa del Carmen in Mexico
		FCZ summary	13' (0:1) Gygax; 16' (0:2) Renfer; 26' (0:3) Renfer; 39' (0:4) Renfer; 57' (0:5) Chassot; 75' (0:6) Chassot; 78' (0:7) Yasar; 90' (0:8) Iodice

6 February 2002 Exhibition game	Zürich	4–1	SC Young Fellows Juventus	Trainings pitch Letzigrund, Zürich
	Akalé 9' (1:0); Chassot 18' (2:0); Yasar 56' (3:0); Guerrero 61' (4:1)	FCZ summary	58' (3:1) Loué	Attendance: 200; Referee: (Switzerland) René Rogalla (Wallisellen)

9 February 2002 Exhibition game	Zürich	1–2	Aarau	Trainings pitch Letzigrund, Zürich
	Guerrero (1:1)	FCZ summary	(0:1) Gil (1:2) Okpala	Attendance: 200; Referee: (Liechtenstein) Roland Beck (Triesenberg)

12 February 2002 Exhibition game	Wil	0–0	Zürich	Stadion Bergholz, Wil
		FCZ summary		Referee: (Switzerland) Nicole Petignat (Courgenay)
Note: Very soft ground.

== Sources ==
- dbFCZ Homepage
- Switzerland 2001–02 at RSSSF

Preceded by 1999–2000	FC Zürich seasons	Succeeded by 2002–03
