= 2005–06 Swiss Cup =

Tournament details
- Country: Switzerland

Final positions
- Champions: FC Sion
- Runners-up: BSC Young Boys

The 2005–06 Swiss Cup was the 81st season of Switzerland's annual cup competition. It began on 16 September with the first games of Round 1 and ended on 17 April 2006 with the Final held at Stade de Suisse, Wankdorf, Bern. The winners earned a place in the second qualifying round of the UEFA Cup.

== Round 1 ==
Team 1	Score	Team 2
16 September 2005
SC Derendingen	1–3	FC Concordia Basel
SC Zofingen	2–0	FC Wohlen
17 September 2005
FC Bülach	0–8	FC Zürich
FC Giffers-Tentlingen	1–8	FC Sion
Losone Sportiva	3–3 (a.e.t.) (p. 5–6)	FC Wil
FC Echallens	1–3	FC La Chaux-de-Fonds
FC Landquart-Herrschaft	1–2	FC Locarno
FC Breitenrain	1–6	SC Kriens
FC Wittenbach	0–0 (a.e.t.) (p. 4–5)	SV Schaffhausen
FC Arbon	1–3	AC Lugano
FC Thalwil	0–1	AC Bellinzona
SC Cham	0–1	FC Winterthur
FC Schattdorf	1–5	SC YF Juventus
FC Orpund	0–8	BSC Young Boys
FC Le Mont	2–0 (a.e.t.)	FC Monthey
US Collombey-Muraz	4–2	FC Lausanne-Sport
FC Kölliken	3–4	BSC Old Boys
AC Taverne	1–2 (a.e.t.)	FC Chiasso
FC Meilen	0–2	FC Küssnacht a/R
FC Sursee	1–3	FC Baden
Stade Payerne	1–5	FC Luzern
SV Lyss	0–4	FC Baulmes
FC Perly-Certoux	1–0	Étoile-Carouge FC
FC Ascona	1–3	FC Schaffhausen
18 September 2005
SC Düdingen	0–1	FC Thun
Zug 94	2–6	Grasshoppers
FC Bex	0–4	Neuchâtel Xamax FC
Servette FC	4–2 (a.e.t.)	FC Meyrin
FC Cortaillod	0–2	Yverdon-Sport FC
GC Biaschesi	1–5	FC St. Gallen
SR Delémont	2–3	FC Aarau
19 September 2005
FC Solothurn	1–4	FC Basel

== Round 2 ==
Team 1	Score	Team 2
22 October 2005
FC Le Mont	2–3 (a.e.t.)	FC Sion
BSC Old Boys	1–6	FC Basel
FC Baden	0–2	FC Schaffhausen
FC Küssnacht a/R	2–1	FC St. Gallen
SC Zofingen	0–2	FC Wil
AC Lugano	2–1	Neuchâtel Xamax FC
FC Luzern	0–0 (a.e.t.) (p. 4–2)	FC Concordia Basel
SC YF Juventus	0–2	FC Zürich
23 October 2005
FC Perly-Certoux	1–7	FC Thun
FC La Chaux-de-Fonds	0–4	BSC Young Boys
FC Locarno	3–2 (a.e.t.)	Yverdon-Sport FC
US Collombey-Muraz	0–3	Servette FC
FC Chiasso	0–2	AC Bellinzona
FC Winterthur	4–2	Grasshoppers
SV Schaffhausen	1–3	SC Kriens
FC Baulmes	1–4	FC Aarau

== Round 3 ==
Team 1	Score	Team 2
10 December 2005
FC Küssnacht a/R	1–2	FC Locarno
11 December 2005
FC Winterthur	2–0 (a.e.t.)	FC Luzern
FC Sion	1–0	AC Bellinzona
AC Lugano	2–1	FC Wil
17 December 2005
Servette FC	1–1 (a.e.t.) (p. 5–4)	FC Thun
18 December 2005
SC Kriens	1–2	BSC Young Boys
FC Schaffhausen	0–0 (a.e.t.) (p. 4–5)	FC Aarau
FC Basel	3–4	FC Zürich

== Quarter-finals ==
Team 1	Score	Team 2
4 February 2006
FC Locarno	0–1	FC Sion
5 February 2006
FC Aarau	1–1 (a.e.t.) (p. 2–3)	FC Zürich
AC Lugano	1–2	BSC Young Boys
Servette FC	1–3 (a.e.t.)	FC Winterthur

== Semi-finals ==
Team 1	Score	Team 2
15 March 2006
FC Winterthur	0–1	FC Sion
FC Zürich	1–4	BSC Young Boys

== Final ==
17 April 2006
15:00

BSC Young Boys	1 – 1 (a.e.t.)	FC Sion
Varela 16'	SFL summary	55' Obradović
Penalties
João Paulo (penalty missed); H. Yakin (penalty scored); Calvano (penalty scored); Raimondi (penalty scored)	3 – 5	(penalty scored) Obradović; (penalty scored) Di Zenzo; (penalty scored) Crettenand; (penalty scored) Gaspoz; (penalty scored) Regazzoni

Stade de Suisse, Wankdorf, Bern
Attendance: 30,659
Referee: (Switzerland) Reto Rutz
