= Patrick Baumann =

Patrick Baumann may refer to:

- Patrick Baumann (footballer) (born 1982), Swiss footballer
- Patrick Baumann (basketball) (1967–2018), Swiss basketball player, coach and executive

== See also ==
- Patrik Baumann (born 1986), Swiss footballer
