= Marc Zellweger (disambiguation) =

Marc Zellweger may refer to:

- Marc "Zelli" Zellweger, vocalist for Swiss metalcore/deathcore band, Paleface Swiss
- Marc Zellweger (born 1973), Swiss former footballer
