= Patrick Bettoni =

Swiss-Italian footballer (born 1975)

Personal information
- Date of birth: 29 December 1975 (age 50)
- Place of birth: Winterthur, Switzerland
- Height: 1.92 m (6 ft 4 in)
- Position: Goalkeeper

Team information
- Current team: FC Thun
- Number: 1

Senior career*
Years	Team	Apps	(Gls)
1993–1996	FC Winterthur		
1996–1998	FC Baden		
1998–1999	Vicenza Calcio		
1999–2001	Ascoli Calcio		
2001–2002	AC Reggiana		
2002–2004	Neuchâtel Xamax		
2004–2006	BSC Young Boys		
2006–	FC Thun	55	(0)
- * Club domestic league appearances and goals as of 7 October 2008

Patrick Bettoni (born 29 December 1975) is a Swiss-Italian former footballer who played as a goalkeeper. He last played for FC Thun in the Swiss Challenge League. He weighs 78 kg.
