= Eugène Ekobo =

Cameroonian footballer (born 1981)

Personal information
- Full name: Eugène-Claude Ekobo N'Joh
- Date of birth: 15 February 1981 (age 45)
- Place of birth: Douala, Cameroon
- Height: 1.82 m (6 ft 0 in)
- Positions: Defender; midfielder

Youth career
- –2000: Avenir Douala

Senior career*
Years	Team	Apps	(Gls)
2000–2002	FC Sion	50	(1)
2002–2004	Beauvais	70	(2)
2004–2006	Créteil	73	(1)
2006–2008	Strasbourg	29	(0)
2007–2008	→ Châteauroux (loan)	25	(0)
2008–2009	→ Vannes (loan)	28	(1)
2009–2017	Clermont	240	(2)
Total		515	(7)
- * Club domestic league appearances and goals

Eugène-Claude Ekobo N'Joh (born 15 February 1981) is a Cameroonian former professional footballer who played as a defender or midfielder. He left Cameroon to join Swiss club FC Sion and went on to spend his career in France.

== Honours ==
Vannes

- Coupe de la Ligue: runner-up 2008–09
