= Daniel Graf =

German footballer

Personal information
- Full name: Daniel Graf
- Date of birth: 3 August 1977 (age 49)
- Place of birth: Kaiserslautern, West Germany
- Height: 1.78 m (5 ft 10 in)
- Position: Forward

Youth career
- 1982–1994: 1. FC Kaiserslautern
- 1994–1995: FC Homburg

Senior career*
Years	Team	Apps	(Gls)
1995–1999	1. FC Kaiserslautern II	60	(27)
1998–1999	1. FC Kaiserslautern	2	(0)
1999–2000	Fortuna Köln	24	(5)
2000	Kickers Offenbach	3	(0)
2000–2003	Karlsruher SC	75	(14)
2003–2007	Eintracht Braunschweig	83	(23)
Total		247	(69)

International career
1997	Germany U-21	1	(0)
- * Club domestic league appearances and goals

Daniel Graf (born 3 August 1977) is a German former professional footballer who played as a forward. He spent one season in the Bundesliga with 1. FC Kaiserslautern, as well as five seasons in the 2. Bundesliga with Fortuna Köln, Karlsruher SC, and Eintracht Braunschweig. His career was plagued by injuries, which led to him having to retire early from football in 2007.
