= Achille Njanke =

Cameroonian footballer

Personal information
- Full name: Achille Njanke
- Date of birth: 11 January 1984 (age 42)
- Place of birth: Yaoundé, Cameroon
- Height: 1.83 m (6 ft 0 in)
- Position: Striker

Team information
- Current team: FC Grenchen

Senior career*
Years	Team	Apps	(Gls)
2002–2003	AC Lugano	11	(0)
2003–2004	SR Delémont	26	(7)
2004–2005	FC Meyrin	30	(18)
2005–2007	FC Baulmes	29	(5)
2008	Yverdon-Sport	7	(0)
2009–	FC Grenchen		
- * Club domestic league appearances and goals

Achille Njanke (born 11 January 1984 in Yaoundé) is a Cameroonian footballer. He plays for FC Grenchen in Switzerland.

Njanke followed FC Baulmes relegated to 1. Liga in summer 2007. But after played 2 games and scored two goals, he joined Yverdon-Sport on 15 January 2008. He signed for current club FC Grenchen on 1 February 2009.
