= Rijat Shala =

Swiss kosovan footballer (born 1983)

Personal information
- Date of birth: 26 July 1983 (age 43)
- Place of birth: Prizren, Yugoslavia
- Height: 1.78 m (5 ft 10 in)
- Position: Midfielder

Senior career*
Years	Team	Apps	(Gls)
2000–2003	Lugano	45	(1)
2003–2004	Schaffhausen	4	(0)
2004–2005	Grasshopper	20	(0)
2005–2006	Salernitana	54	(2)
2006–2007	Foggia	17	(0)
2007–2008	Cagliari	0	(0)
2008–2009	Taranto	13	(0)
2009–2011	Novara	40	(1)
2011–2012	Lugano	1	(0)
2014	Teuta	11	(0)
2014	Vllaznia	9	(0)
2015	Amicale		
2017-2018	FC Rapid Lugano		
2018	AS Breganzona		

International career^{‡}
2004–2006	Switzerland U-21	26	(0)
- * Club domestic league appearances and goals as of 2 January 2010 ‡ National team caps and goals as of 2006

Rijat Shala (Serbo-Croat: Rijat Šala; born 26 July 1983) is a Swiss footballer of Kosovar Albanian descent who most recently played for Swiss lower league club AS Breganzona.

== Club career ==
He spent the 2007–08 season with Serie A side Cagliari, making his club debut on a Coppa Italia match that won 2–1 to A.C. Siena, on 29 August 2007. He however did not manage to gain a single first team appearance, being quickly relegated into the reserves, and in July 2008 Cagliari released him from the squad. He played for Lega Pro Prima Divisione club Taranto in 2008. In mid-2009 he left for Prima Divisione Novara, winning a successive promotion in 2010 (to Serie B) and in 2011 (Serie A). In the first Novara season, he only earned a gross annual salary of €76,900. He later played for KF Vllaznia Shkodër in the Albanian Superliga.

He employed Bruno Carpeggiani (of "Italian Managers Group srl.") as his agent on 12 December 2008 but unilaterally terminated the contract during 2009–10 season. In 2011 Tribunale Nazionale di Arbitrato per lo Sport of CONI awarded a decision that Shala had to pay Carpeggiani €3,845 as agent fee (€76,900 x 5%).
