= Walter Grüter =

Swiss football manager

Personal information
- Date of birth: 9 January 1954 (age 72)
- Place of birth: Zürich, Switzerland
- Height: 1.78 m (5 ft 10 in)

Managerial career
- Years: Team
- 1986–1994: Grasshopper Club Zürich (assistant)
- 1994–1996: Istanbulspor (assistant)
- 1996–2001: Grasshopper Club Zürich (assistant)
- 2001–2001: FC Winterthur
- 2001–2004: FC Zürich (assistant)
- 2004: FC Zürich
- 2004: FC Zürich (assistant)
- 2004–2006: FC Concordia Basel (physical coach)
- 2006–2007: FC Concordia Basel
- 2007–2011: Grasshopper Club Zürich (physical coach)
- 2011–2012: FC Lucerne (assistant)
- 2013: FC Basel (physical coach)
- 2013–2014: FC Regensdorf
- 2014–2015: FC Spartak Moscow (assistant)
- 2017–2018: FC Regensdorf
- 2019–2020: Grasshopper Club Zürich women
- 2020–: Grasshopper Club Zürich (Fitness coach)

Walter Grüter (born 9 January 1954) is a Swiss football manager. Grüter is currently working as Fitness coach for Grasshopper Club Zürich.
