= Simon Hofer =

Swiss footballer (born 1981)

Personal information
- Date of birth: 22 July 1981 (age 45)
- Place of birth: Switzerland
- Position: Midfielder

Team information
- Current team: FC Baar
- Number: 14

Senior career*
Years	Team	Apps	(Gls)
1999–2004	FC Lucerne	50	(6)
2004–2010	SC Cham	56	(8)
2010–	FC Baar		

International career
2002	Switzerland U21	1	(0)
- * Club domestic league appearances and goals as of 9 February 2008

Simon Hofer (born 22 July 1981) is a Swiss footballer who plays for FC Baar. He formerly played for SC Cham for and FC Lucerne in the Swiss Super League.
