= Goran Obradović (footballer, born 1976) =

Serbian footballer

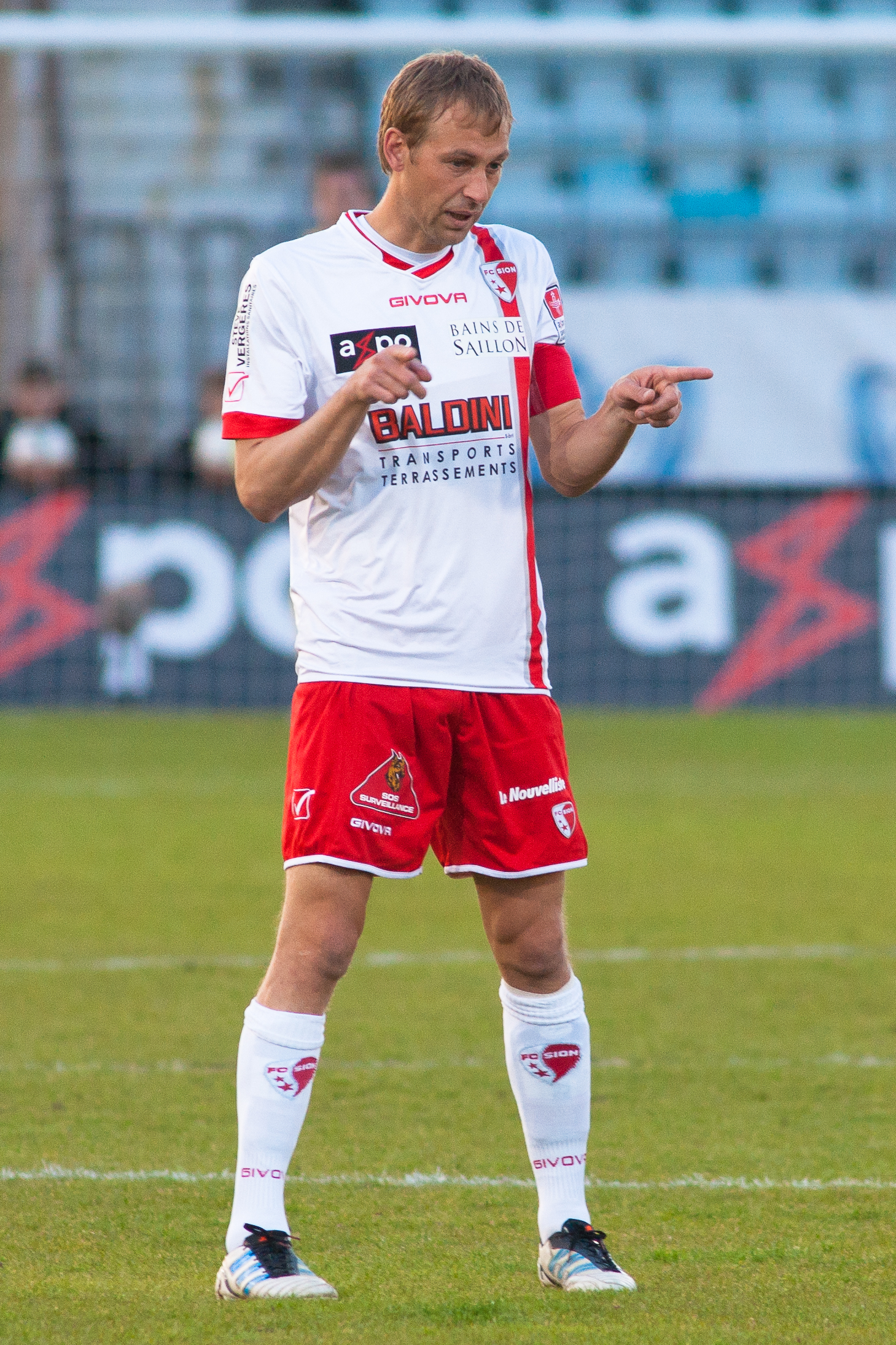
- Obradović with Sion in 2012

Personal information
- Full name: Goran Obradović
- Date of birth: 1 March 1976 (age 50)
- Place of birth: Aranđelovac, SFR Yugoslavia
- Height: 1.85 m (6 ft 1 in)
- Position: Midfielder

Youth career
- Šumadija Aranđelovac

Senior career*
Years	Team	Apps	(Gls)
1996–2000	Partizan	88	(31)
2001–2004	Servette	90	(18)
2004	St. Gallen	9	(0)
2005	Vaduz	16	(7)
2005–2012	Sion	188	(28)
2013	Monthey	9	(1)
Total		400	(85)
- * Club domestic league appearances and goals

Goran Obradović (Serbian Cyrillic: Горан Обрадовић; born 1 March 1976) is a Serbian retired footballer who played as a midfielder.

== Career ==
Born in Aranđelovac, Obradović joined Partizan in 1996, spending the next four and a half years at the club. He won three major trophies with the Crno-beli, two domestic league titles (1997 and 1999) and one national cup in 1998. In the winter of 2001, Obradović moved abroad and signed with Swiss club Servette. He also briefly played for St. Gallen and Vaduz, before moving to Sion in 2005. Subsequently, Obradović spent the following seven seasons at the club, winning the Swiss Cup on three occasions (2006, 2009 and 2011), scoring in two of the finals (2006 and 2009).

== Honours ==
Partizan

- First League of FR Yugoslavia: 1996–97, 1998–99
- FR Yugoslavia Cup: 1997–98

Sion

- Swiss Cup: 2005–06, 2008–09, 2010–11
