= Sébastien Jeanneret =

Swiss footballer (born 1973)

Personal information
- Date of birth: 12 December 1973 (age 52)
- Place of birth: Le Locle, Switzerland
- Position: Defender

Senior career*
Years	Team	Apps	(Gls)
1991–1993	FC La Chaux-de-Fonds	62	(0)
1993–1999	Neuchâtel Xamax	137	(8)
1999–2000	Servette	52	(0)
2000–2003	Zürich	32	(0)

International career
1996–2000	Switzerland	18	(0)
- * Club domestic league appearances and goals

Sébastien Jeanneret (born 12 December 1973) is a former Swiss football player.

He played mostly for Neuchâtel Xamax, Servette FC and FC Zürich.

He played for Switzerland national football team and was a participant at the 1996 UEFA European Championship.
