= Yves Miéville =

Swiss footballer (born 1983)

Personal information
- Full name: Yves Miéville
- Date of birth: 8 December 1983 (age 42)
- Place of birth: Fribourg, Switzerland
- Height: 1.90 m (6 ft 3 in)
- Position: Defender

Youth career
- FC Fribourg: ServetteFC

Senior career*
Years	Team	Apps	(Gls)
2000–2004	Servette FC	92	(0)
2004–2005	FC Schaffhausen	17	(6)
2005–2005	FC Meyrin	16	(4)
2006–2007	FC Lausanne-Sport	42	(13)
2007–2010	FC Stade Nyonnais	83	(17)
2010–2011	Étoile Carouge FC	32	(8)
- * Club domestic league appearances and goals

Yves Miéville (born 12 December 1983) is a Swiss football player. He started his career with his local team Servette FC making his debut during the 2000–01 season. In 2004, he moved to FC Schaffhausen where he spent one season before moving onto FC Meyrin. Halfway through the season, in 2006, he moved to FC Lausanne-Sport. And after FC Stade Nyonnais and Étoile Carouge FC Miéville is a powerful centre back but has also been used as a target man on occasion to help out due to injuries to other players. He played for the national team with the young team.
