= Jefferson Batista =

Brazilian footballer

Personal information
- Full name: Jefferson Alexandre Batista
- Date of birth: 23 February 1976 (age 50)
- Place of birth: São Paulo, Brazil
- Height: 1.85 m (6 ft 1 in)
- Positions: Forward; attacking midfielder

Youth career
- 1988–1995: Corinthians

Senior career*
Years	Team	Apps	(Gls)
1995	Guarani		
1996	FinnPa	1	(0)
1996	KuPS	7	(2)
1997	Corinthians		
1997	Pelotas		
1998	Mogi Mirim		
1998	Guarani		
1999	Alania Vladikavkaz	11	(1)
1999–2000	Uralan Elista	18	(6)
2000–2002	FC St. Gallen	34	(8)
2002–2003	FC Zürich	9	(1)
2003–2004	Vitória Bahía	21	(5)
2004–2005	Neuchâtel Xamax	9	(2)
2005–2006	Paulista		
2006	Coritiba		
2007	Nanjing Yoyo		
2007	Ituano		
2007–2008	Guangzhou Pharmaceutical		
2008–2009	Vojvodina	0	(0)
2009	Zagen		
- * Club domestic league appearances and goals

Jefferson Alexandre Batista (born 23 February 1976 in São Paulo) is a retired Brazilian footballer.

== Career ==
After playing in the youth teams of Corinthians, he represented the senior Brazilian clubs Pelotas, Mogi Mirim, Guarani, Vitória, Paulista and Coritiba. He also had a rich career abroad having played in Finland with FinnPa; Russia, with FC Alania Vladikavkaz and FC Uralan Elista; Switzerland, with FC St. Gallen, FC Zürich and Neuchâtel Xamax; Serbia, with FK Vojvodina; and China, with Nanjing Yoyo, Guangzhou Pharmaceutical and Zagen.

He began as a forward but gradually became an offensive midfielder.

After retiring, he became director of a sports management and marketing company.

== Honours ==
Paulista

- Copa do Brasil: 2005

Guangzhou

- China League One: 2007

== External sources ==
- Jefferson Batista at Sambafoot (archived)
- Stats from Playerhistory
