= Stephan Keller =

Swiss footballer (born 1979)

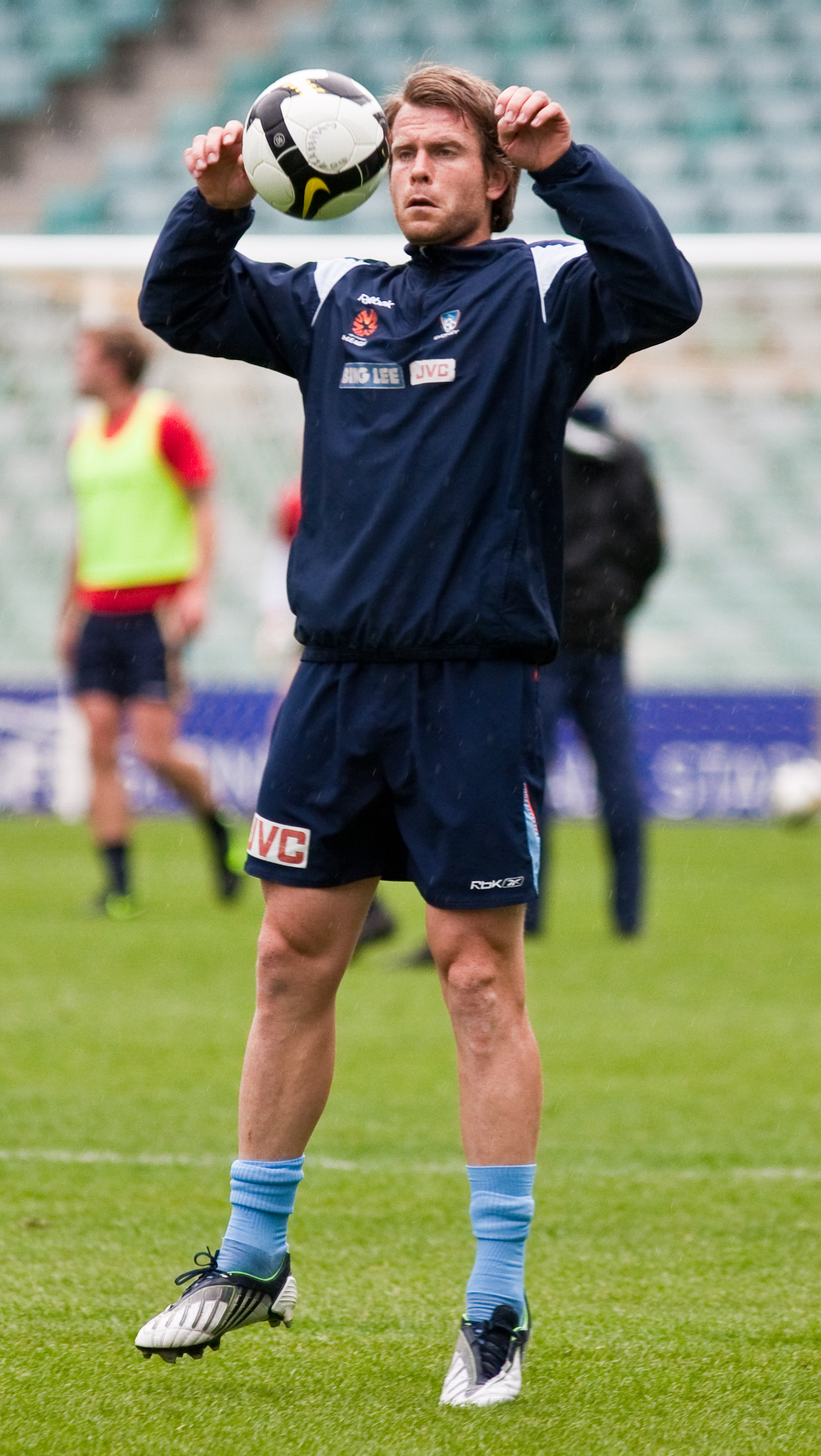
- Keller in 2009

Personal information
- Full name: Stephan Andrin Keller
- Date of birth: 31 May 1979 (age 47)
- Place of birth: Zürich, Switzerland
- Height: 1.90 m (6 ft 3 in)
- Position: Centre-back

Youth career
- 1986-1999: Grasshopper Club Zürich

Senior career*
Years	Team	Apps	(Gls)
1999–2001	Neuchâtel Xamax	63	(1)
2001–2002	Kriens	10	(1)
2002–2004	Zürich	61	(3)
2004	→ Aarau (loan)	12	(0)
2004–2005	Rot-Weiß Erfurt	19	(2)
2005–2007	RKC Waalwijk	47	(3)
2007–2009	De Graafschap	39	(3)
2009–2011	Sydney FC	53	(1)
2011–2012	Willem II	17	(1)
Total		321	(15)

International career
2002	Switzerland U-21	4	(0)
2002–2003	Switzerland	3	(0)

Managerial career
- 2012–2013: PSV U17 (assistant)
- 2013–2017: NAC (youth)
- 2017–2020: FC Aarau (assistant)
- 2018: FC Aarau (caretaker)
- 2020–2022: FC Aarau
- 2023-2024: FC Baden (advisor)
- * Club domestic league appearances and goals

Stephan Keller (born 31 May 1979) is a Swiss football manager and a former player.

== Club career ==
=== Europe ===
Keller is a defender, born in Zürich, who played 13 years of youth career for Grasshopper Club Zürich. He made his debut in professional football by being part of the Neuchâtel Xamax squad in the 1999–2000 season.

Keller spent the majority of his career playing for various clubs in the Swiss Super League before moving to Germany to play for 2. Bundesliga team Rot-Weiß Erfurt. After spending half a season there he moved to the Netherlands, where he spent four years playing in the Eredivisie playing for RKC Waalwijk and De Graafschap respectively.

=== Sydney FC ===
After four years in the Netherlands, Keller moved to Australia to play for Sydney FC in the A-League. On 26 July, he made his debut for Sydney FC in a friendly match against Newcastle Jets. He re-signed with Sydney FC for the 2010–11 A-League season. He scored his first goal for Sydney FC in the Round 5, 3–1 loss to Adelaide United at the Sydney Football Stadium. Following a poor second season and Champions League campaign from Sydney FC, Keller was released along with several other players.

=== Netherlands ===
Keller returned to Europe and sparked interest from former Eredivise club RKC Waalwijk. However, in a shock move Willem II signed Keller on a two-year contract, snatching him from under the nose of his former employee.

After being dropped to the reserves during the back half of the 2011–12 season, Keller and Willem II mutually terminated his contract with the club after he was told he was surplus to requirements, following the club's promotion to the Eredivise for the 2012–13 Eredivisie season.

== Managerial career ==
Keller joined FC Aarau before the 2017–18 season as assistant manager to Ton Verkerk. He was caretaker manager following Verkerk's dismissal. Patrick Rahmen was installed as new manager the following season and Keller stayed with the club as his assistant. Keller was named the manager at FC Aarau on 10 July 2020 following the dismissal of Rahmen. His contract goes through 30 June 2023.

On 1 November 2022, after a six game winless streak in the league, he was dismissed from his position as head coach at Aarau.

== Honours ==
Sydney FC

- A-League Premiership: 2009–10
- A-League Championship: 2009–10
