= Emanuele Di Zenzo =

Swiss football midfielder (born 1979)

Personal information
- Full name: Emanuele Di Zenzo
- Date of birth: 26 December 1979 (age 46)
- Height: 1.74 m (5 ft 9 in)
- Position: Midfielder

Senior career*
Years	Team	Apps	(Gls)
1997–1998	FC Sion	3	(0)
1998–2000	Servette FC	11	(0)
2000–2001	FC Locarno	26	(2)
2001–2004	SR Delémont	77	(13)
2004–2007	FC Sion	65	(7)
2007–2008	FC Sion U-21	11	(1)
2008	AC Bellinzona	7	(0)
- * Club domestic league appearances and goals as of 11 July 2008

Emanuele Di Zenzo (born 26 December 1979) is a Swiss football midfielder who most recently played for AC Bellinzona in the Swiss Super League.

== Career ==
He suffered a serious injury which forced him to play only for FC Sion's reserve team during the 2007-08 season; subsequently he moved to newly promoted AC Bellinzona, where he made his first Super League appearance in over a year. He left the team in winter 2008.

== Honours ==
Sion

- Swiss Cup: 2005–06
