= Adnan Jashari =

Minister of justice of the government of the Republic of Macedonia

Adnan Jashari (born November 29, 1965) is a Minister of Justice, an associate Professor in Law, and a member of the Democratic Union for Integration (DUI), the Albanian ethnic community party in Macedonia.

== Studies and academic career ==
From January 1997 to July 2002, he studied at the University of Prishtina, where he studied to become a doctor of juridical sciences, Ph.D. in Law. His thesis was titled, "Foreign direct investment in developing countries with a unique look at Macedonia".

From 2003 to 2011 he was professor of Business, Fiscal and International Economic Law at South East European University (SEEU), Tetovо.

From 2004 to 2008 he was vice-president of the Board for Accreditation of Higher Education in the Republic of Macedonia, where he participated in the accreditation process for many universities and colleges in the country.

From 2007 to 2009 he taught as professor at the private University FAMA, Kosova, Prishtine.

He was also a consultant in a number of legislative committees in drafting laws in the area of business law in the Republic of Macedonia and in the Republic of Kosovo.

== Political career ==
From 1997-2003 Jashari worked as Inspector of the Public Revenue Service in Gostivar. From 2002-2005 he was the Secretary of DUI in Gostivar and member of the board of that party.

From 2003–2009 (according other sources 2002-2006 and 2006-2010) he was member of Parliament of Macedonia, member of the Legislative Committee, Committee on Agriculture, Forestry and Water Resources Management, Committee on Education, Science and Sport, member of the Parliamentary Group of the Assembly of the Republic of Macedonia for Cooperation with the Parliament of the Republic of Ukraine, and Australia, chairman of the Group with the Parliament of Netherlands.

Some of the laws that have been passed in the Parliament of the Republic of Macedonia, are: Law on Trade Companies in the Republic of Macedonia, Bankruptcy Law in the Republic of Macedonia, Law on Higher Education in the Republic of Macedonia, Law on Intellectual Property in the Republic of Macedonia, and many more.

In June 2014, Adnan Jashari was appointed as the Minister of Justice in the Government of Premier Nikola Gruevski. He replaced Blerim Bexheti, who is also a politician of DUI.

== Publications ==
- A. Jashari, Commercial Law, published vy SEEU, Tetovo, 2012.
- A.Jashari. Subject of business law. Tetovo, 2009. ISBN 978-9989-2967-0-3.
- A.Jashari. Pignus according to Albanian customary law. In Jehona, pp. 12. 2009. ISSN 1857-6354.
- I. Zejneli, J. Shasivari, A. Aliu, A. Bilalli, A. Jashari. Dictionary Albanian –Macedonian and vice versa. Published by SEEU, 2008. ISBN 978-608-4503-01-9.
- A.Jashari. FDI-Foreign Direct Investment in transitional countries. Published by SEEU, 2007. ISBN 978-9989-2705-4-3.

Professor Jashari also wrote articles about Intellectual property rights, the property regime of spouses in German law, responsibility for medical errors, economic competition, transformation of trade companies, responsibility for environment damage, technology transfer and customer protection.
