= Mario Raimondi =

Swiss footballer (born 1980)

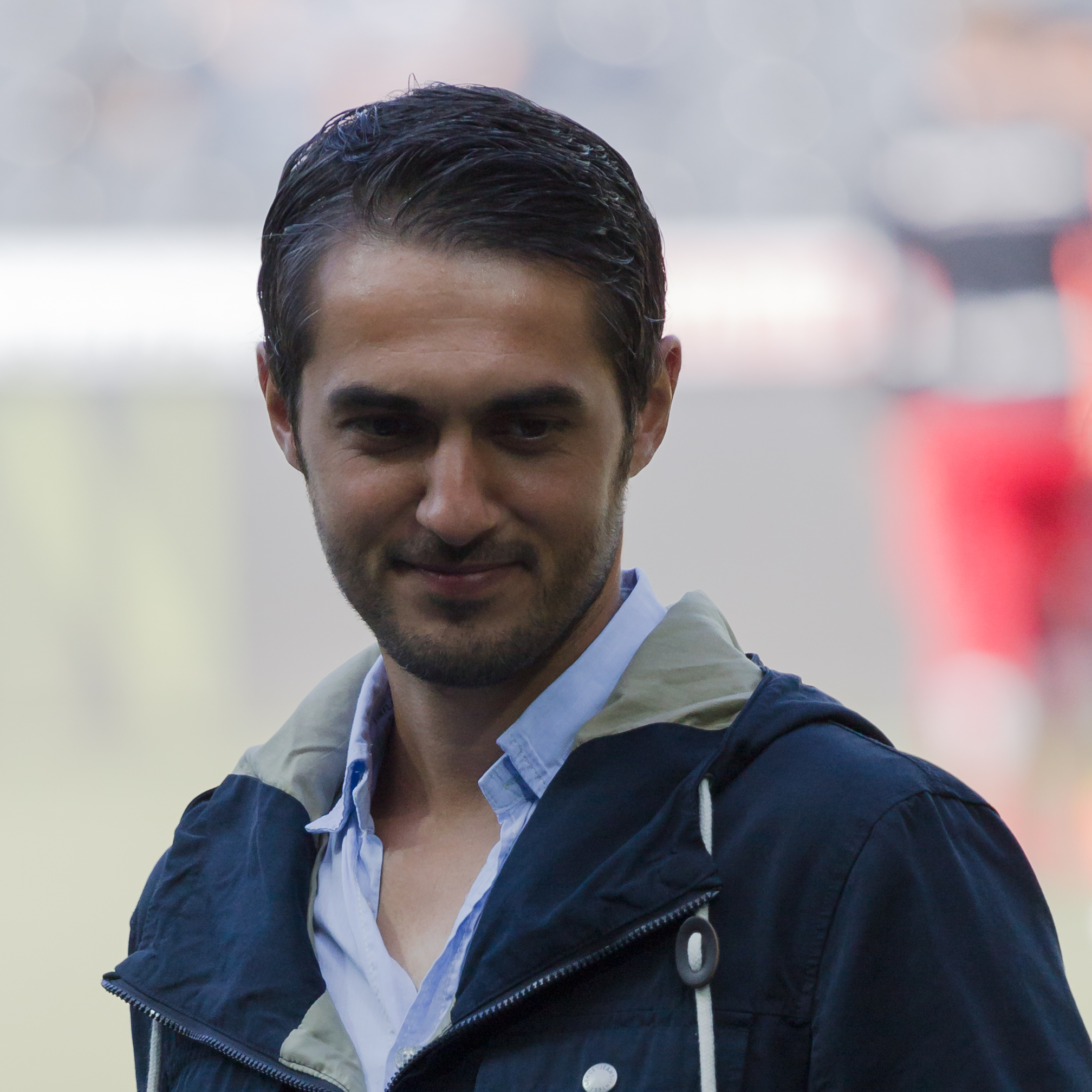

Personal information
- Date of birth: 10 July 1980 (age 46)
- Height: 1.82 m (6 ft 0 in)
- Position: Left winger

Team information
- Current team: BSC Young Boys
- Number: 16

Youth career
- FC Oberdiessbach
- FC Dürrenast

Senior career*
Years	Team	Apps	(Gls)
1998–2005	FC Thun	188	(38)
2002–2003	→ FC Zürich (loan)	23	(2)
2005–2013	BSC Young Boys	183	(32)

International career
?–2002	Switzerland U-21	4	(0)
- * Club domestic league appearances and goals

Mario Raimondi (born 10 July 1980) is a former Swiss football player. His last club was BSC Young Boys.

He joined Young Boys on 5 July 2005.
