= Tariq Chihab =

Moroccan footballer

Personal information
- Full name: Tariq Chihab
- Date of birth: 22 November 1975 (age 50)
- Place of birth: Kenitra, Morocco
- Height: 6 ft 2 in (1.88 m)
- Position: Defender

Senior career*
Years	Team	Apps	(Gls)
1993–2000	Chabab Mohammedia		
2000–2004	FC Zürich	99	(8)
2004–2006	Grasshopper	51	(4)
2006–2007	FC Sion	15	(0)
2007–2009	Neuchâtel Xamax	56	(8)
2009–2010	FC Sion	20	(2)
2010–2014	FC Saxon Sports		

International career
2002–2005	Morocco	18	(0)
- * Club domestic league appearances and goals

Tariq Chihab (Arabic: طارق شهاب, born 22 November 1975) is a retired Moroccan footballer.

== Club career ==
After leaving Moroccan club SC Chabab Mohammedia, Chihab began his Swiss career at FC Zürich. Chihab proved proficient across the field for Zürich, playing offensive and defensive midfield, supporting striker and dedicated defender. At the end of his contract, Chihab was contracted by FC Zürich rival Grasshopper Zürich, where he was placed in a more fixed defensive role. Over the 2006 summer break, Chihab transferred to FC Sion and back into the role of midfielder. In the 2007 summer he signed a one-year contract with Neuchâtel Xamax

== National team ==
His appearances for Morocco include the 2004 African Cup of Nations, friendly matches in 2002 and 2004, and 2006 FIFA World Cup qualifying matches against Malawi.
