= Wilco Hellinga =

Dutch association football player

Personal information
- Date of birth: 16 August 1970 (age 56)
- Place of birth: Gorredijk, Netherlands
- Height: 1.72 m (5 ft 8 in)
- Position: Defender

Youth career
- VV Gorredijk

Senior career*
Years	Team	Apps	(Gls)
1989–1995	Heerenveen	65	(4)
1996–1997	Beerschot	21	(1)
1997–1999	St. Gallen	84	(6)
2000	Nürnberg	7	(0)
2000–2003	Zürich	74	(1)
2003–2006	Veendam	48	(1)
Total		234	(9)

Managerial career
- 2010-: Heerenveen (academy)
- * Club domestic league appearances and goals

Wilco Hellinga (born 16 August 1970 in the Netherlands) is a Dutch retired footballer who last played for SC Veendam in his home country.

== Career ==
Born in Gorredijk, Hellinga started his football career with local amateur side VV Gorredijk. In 1990, he signed for SC Heerenveen in the Dutch Eredivisie, where he made forty-nine league appearances and scored four goals. After that, he played for St. Gallen, whom he had joined from Belgian second-tier Beerschot, alongside compatriots Edwin Vurens and Erik Regtop.

After half a season at German second-tier Nürnberg, Hellinga returned to Switzerland to join Zürich and back in the Netherlands played for SC Veendam. He retired in 2006.
