= Francisco Guerrero (footballer, born 1977) =

Argentine footballer

Personal information
- Full name: Francisco Gabriel Guerrero
- Date of birth: August 23, 1977 (age 49)
- Place of birth: Buenos Aires, Argentina
- Height: 1.72 m (5 ft 8 in)
- Position: Striker

Youth career
- –1994: Independiente

Senior career*
Years	Team	Apps	(Gls)
1994–2001	Independiente	107	(23)
2001–2005	FC Zürich	62	(6)
2004	→ FC Basel (loan)	13	(1)
2005–2007	Estudiantes de La Plata	5	(0)
2006	→ Huracán de Tres Arroyos (loan)	9	(1)
2007	YF Juventus	12	(6)
2007–2009	FC Aarau	17	(0)
2009–2010	APEP	15	(3)

International career
1995	Argentina U-20		
Medal record
Men's football
Representing Argentina
FIFA U-20 World Cup
Winner	1995 Qatar
- * Club domestic league appearances and goals

Francisco Gabriel Guerrero (born 23 August 1977, in Buenos Aires) is an Argentine former football player who played as striker.

== Career ==
Guerrero advanced from the U-20 team to Independiente's first team in 1994. In 2001 he was transferred to Switzerland and joined FC Zurich under head coach Georges Bregy. He played with them on occasion, but not regularly. After two and a half seasons he was loaned out.

On 12 February 2004 he signed a half-year loan contract with FC Basel. The club were looking for replacements for the two Swiss internationals Marco Streller and Hakan Yakin who both transferred to VfB Stuttgart. Guerrero joined Basel's first team during their 2003–04 season under head coach Christian Gross. Guerrero was the fourth Argentinian in the team, joining Christian Giménez, Matías Delgado and Julio Hernán Rossi. Gross let Guerrero sit on the bench in every one of the last 18 matches of the season and used him as substitute on 13 occasions, usually as replacement for one of his three countrymen. Guerrero played his domestic league debut for the club in the away game in the Stadion Neufeld on 15 February 2004 as Basel won 1–0 against Young Boys. He scored his first and only goal with the team in the home game in the St. Jakob-Park on 28 February. It was the last goal of the game as Basel won 6–0 against Xamax. Despite the away win to the start of the second half of the season, the team was not as steadfast as it had been before the winter break. Basel ended the season undefeated at home, but were beaten three times away, nevertheless they won the championship with 13 points advantage over their nearest rivals Young Boys.

Following this loan period Guerrero re-joined FC Zurich, now under head coach Lucien Favre. At the end of the 2004–05 season FCZ won the 2004–05 Swiss Cup.

In the summer of 2005 Guerrero returned to Argentina and joined Estudiantes de La Plata, but not being able to gain a place in the starting eleven, he spent six months on loan to Huracán de Tres Arroyos. Shortly after his return to Estudiantes Guerrero resolved his contract with the club and returned to Switzerland. He joined YF Juventus for six months. On 30 June 2007 it was announced that he had joined Aarau. He played for them during two seasons. He finally joined APEP in 2009 before he retired from his football career.

== International career ==
He won 1995 FIFA World Youth Championship.

== Honours ==
Basel

- Swiss Super League: 2003–04

FC Zürich

- Swiss Cup: 2004–05

== Sources ==
- Die ersten 125 Jahre. Publisher: Josef Zindel im Friedrich Reinhardt Verlag, Basel. ISBN 978-3-7245-2305-5
- Verein "Basler Fussballarchiv" Homepage
