= Joël Magnin =

Swiss footballer and manager (born 1971)

Personal information
- Full name: Joël Patrick Magnin
- Date of birth: 31 May 1971 (age 55)
- Place of birth: Neuchâtel, Switzerland
- Height: 1.78 m (5 ft 10 in)
- Position: Midfielder

Team information
- Current team: Young Boys II

Senior career*
Years	Team	Apps	(Gls)
1992–1999	Grasshopper	198	(31)
1996	→Lugano (loan)	9	(1)
1999–2002	Lugano	88	(21)
2002–2007	Young Boys	106	(15)

International career
2001	Switzerland	1	(0)

Managerial career
- 2008–2019: Young Boys II
- 2013: Young Boys (co-manager)
- 2019–2020: Xamax
- 2021: Zürich (assistant)
- 2022–: Young Boys II
- 2024: Young Boys (caretaker)
- 2024: Young Boys (caretaker)
- * Club domestic league appearances and goals

Joël Patrick Magnin (born 31 May 1971) is a Swiss former footballer and manager. He is currently the manager of the BSC Young Boys reserves in the Swiss Promotion League.

== International career ==
Magnin made 1 appearance for the Switzerland national football team in a 1-0 2002 FIFA World Cup qualification win over the Faroe Islands on 2 June 2001.

== Managerial career ==
A longtime youth coach for Young Boys, Magnin signed a 2-year contract to manage Xamax for the 2019-2020 season.

On 4 March 2024, he was appointed caretaker manager of Young Boys, following the termination of head coach Raphaël Wicky. He would act as caretaker until the end of the season, as on 14 May 2024, his replacement Patrick Rahmen for the upcoming season was announced. In this time, he successfully led Young Boys to defend the Swiss Championship title, their 17th in total and their sixth in just seven years.

Following the end of the season, he returned to coaching the U21. However, Rahmen did not last long in his position and Magnin was tasked as caretaker again on 8 October 2024. He will once again act as caretaker until a permanent appointment is made and will then continue coaching the reserves. He returned to the U21s at the end of the year, with Giorgio Contini chosen as head coach of the first team on 18 December 2024. Under his care, the team was able to stabilize and won all five of their home games in the league.

== Managerial statistics ==
As of 15 December 2024

Managerial record by team and tenure
Team	From	To	Record				
Team	From	To	P	W	D	L	Win %
Neuchâtel Xamax	1 July 2019	5 July 2020	31	6	10	15	19.35
Young Boys (caretaker)	4 March 2024	30 June 2024	12	8	2	2	66.67
Young Boys (caretaker)	8 October 2024	18 December 2024	14	6	2	6	42.86
Total			56	19	14	23	33.93

== Honours ==
=== As player ===
Grasshopper Club Zürich

- Swiss Super League (3): 1994–95, 1995–96, 1997–98
- Swiss Cup (1): 1993–94

=== As manager ===
BSC Young Boys

- Swiss Super League: 2023–24 (Note: As caretaker manager)
