= Luca Iodice =

Italian footballer

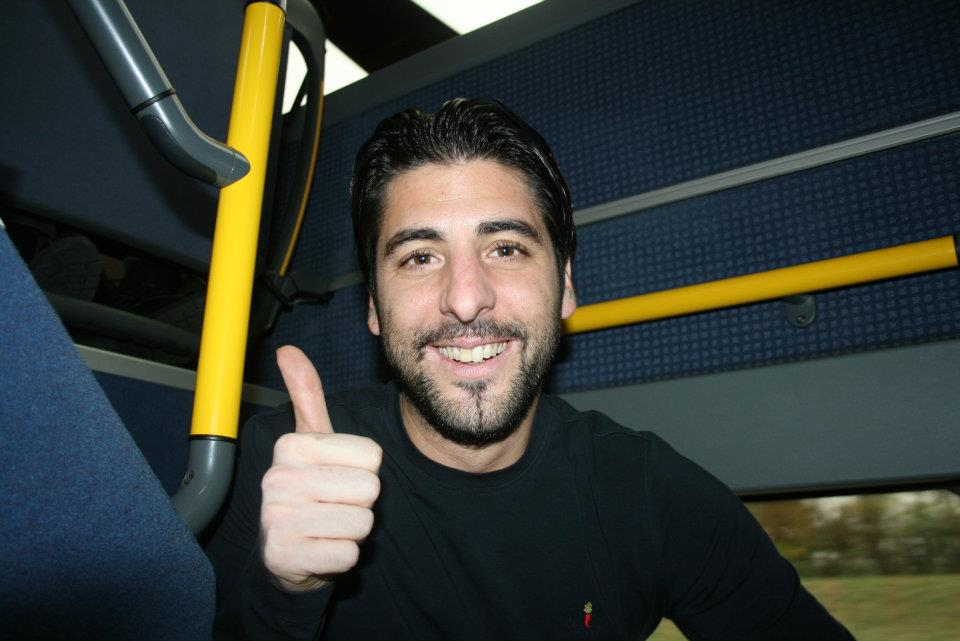
- Iodice in 2011

Personal information
- Date of birth: 11 August 1978 (age 48)
- Height: 1.83 m (6 ft 0 in)
- Position: Midfielder

Senior career*
Years	Team	Apps	(Gls)
1995–1997	Grasshopper Club	9	(0)
1998–1999	FC Zürich	38	(0)
1999	AC Bellinzona		
2000	FC Schaffhausen		
2000–2001	FC Aarau	24	(0)
2001–2002	FC Baden	2	(4)
2002–2004	FC Zürich	48	(4)
2004–2005	FC Winterthur	24	(3)
2005–2007	FC Baden	49	(2)
- * Club domestic league appearances and goals

Luca Iodice (born 11 August 1978) is a retired Italian football midfielder.
