= Ursal Yasar =

Swiss footballer (born 1980)

Personal information
- Date of birth: 12 May 1980 (age 46)
- Place of birth: Niederurnen, Switzerland
- Height: 1.88 m (6 ft 2 in)
- Position: Forward

Youth career
- FC Zürich

Senior career*
Years	Team	Apps	(Gls)
2000–2005	FC Zürich		
2001	→ FC Winterthur (loan)		
2005–2006	FC Schaffhausen		
2006	→ FC Concordia Basel (loan)		
2006	Güngören Belediyespor		
2007	FC Tuggen		
2007	SC YF Juventus		
2008	FC Glarus		
2008–2010	FC Wollishofen		
2010–2012	FC Wädenswil		

International career
- Switzerland U20

Managerial career
- 2008–2010: FC Wollishofen (player-manager)
- 2010–2012: FC Wädenswil (player-manager)
- 2013–2017: FC Zürich (youth system)
- 2018–2019: FC Winterthur (youth)
- 2019–: FC Uster
- * Club domestic league appearances and goals

Ursal Yasar (born 12 May 1980) is a retired Swiss football striker and later manager.
