= Kanga Akalé =

Ivorian footballer (born 1981)

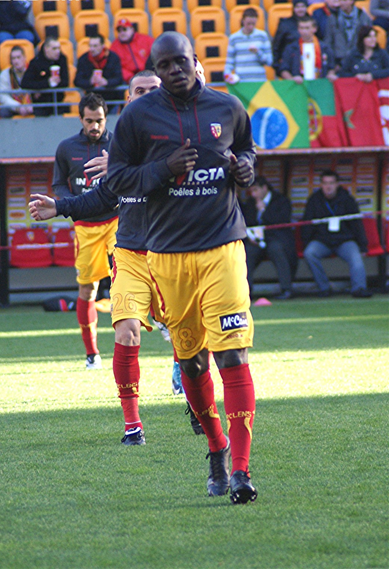
- Akalé with Lens in 2009

Personal information
- Full name: Kanga Gauthier Akalé
- Date of birth: 7 March 1981 (age 45)
- Place of birth: Abidjan, Ivory Coast
- Height: 1.78 m (5 ft 10 in)
- Position: Central midfielder

Senior career*
Years	Team	Apps	(Gls)
1997–1998	Stella Club	17	(6)
1998–1999	Sion	25	(6)
1999–2003	FC Zürich	68	(8)
2003–2007	Auxerre	126	(20)
2007–2011	Lens	67	(5)
2007–2008	→ Marseille (loan)	19	(1)
2008–2009	→ Recreativo Huelva (loan)	26	(0)
2011–2012	Lekhwiya	2	(0)
2012	Panetolikos	9	(0)
2012–2013	Arles-Avignon	4	(0)
Total		363	(46)

International career
2003–2010	Ivory Coast	35	(3)
- * Club domestic league appearances and goals

Kanga Gauthier Akalé (born 7 March 1981) is an Ivorian former professional footballer who played as a midfielder. He played for several clubs in France, including Auxerre and Lens, and made 35 appearances for the Ivory Coast national team. He also participated in the 2006 FIFA World Cup and the 2006 Africa Cup of Nations.

== Club career ==
Whilst at Auxerre he helped them win the Coupe de France in both 2003 and 2005, playing in both finals. In June 2007, Akalé signed a four-year contract with RC Lens for an undisclosed transfer fee, and he was loaned to Marseille in January 2008, then Recreativo de Huelva. Originally a striker, he started playing as a central midfielder or left winger. He is described as a pacey player with top technical abilities.

In 2011, Akalé joined Qatari club Lekhwiya SC to cover for injured striker, and countryman Bakari Koné. He made his debut in the 2011 Qatari Stars Cup on 11 November, and scored a hat-trick against Al Rayyan in a 3–1 win.

On 31 January 2012, Akalé signed a six-month contract with Greek club Panetolikos F.C. About three months after becoming a free agent, on 24 October 2012, Akalé joined French Ligue 2 side Arles-Avignon on a two-year contract.

== International career ==
Akalé made his first start for the Ivory Coast national team on 11 February 2003 in a friendly match against Cameroon in France, Châteauroux, contributing to Ivory Coast's 3–0 victory.

At the 2006 African Cup of Nations, he appeared in both the group stage and knockout stage. Ivory Coast recorded two wins and one defeat in the group stage, before defeating Cameroon on penalties in the quarter-finals. They then defeated Nigeria 1–0 in the semi-finals to reach the final. In the final, Ivory Coast drew 0–0 with Egypt before losing on penalties, finishing as runners-up.

At the 2006 FIFA World Cup, he appeared in all three of Ivory Coast's group-stage matches. He started against Argentina and Serbia and Montenegro, while he came on as a substitute against the Netherlands. Ivory Coast were eliminated after recording one win and two defeats in the group stage.

After missing the 2008 and 2010 Africa Cup of Nations, Akalé was included in Sven-Göran Eriksson's provisional 30-man squad for Ivory Coast ahead of the 2010 FIFA World Cup. However, he was omitted from the final 23-man squad and therefore did not participate in the World Cup.

== Personal life ==
Akalé holds both Ivorian and French nationalities. His son Aaron is a youth international for France.

== Career statistics ==
=== Club ===
Appearances and goals by club, season and competition
Club	Season	League			National cup		League cup		Continental		Total		Ref.
Club	Season	Division	Apps	Goals	Apps	Goals	Apps	Goals	Apps	Goals	Apps	Goals	Ref.
Stella Club	1998	Ligue 1 (Ivory Coast)	17	6							17	6	
Sion	1998–99	Nationalliga A	25	6			–				25	6	
FC Zürich	1999–2000	Nationalliga A	6	0			–		2	0	8	0	
FC Zürich	2000–01	Nationalliga A	16	2			–		1	0	17	2	
FC Zürich	2001–02	Nationalliga A	28	1			–		0	0	28	1	
FC Zürich	2002–03	Nationalliga A	18	5			–		7	4	25	9	
FC Zürich	Total		68	8	0	0	0	0	10	4	78	12	–
Auxerre	2002–03	Ligue 1	6	0	3	0	0	0	1	0	10	0	
Auxerre	2003–04	Ligue 1	23	4	1	0	3	0	4	0	31	4	
Auxerre	2004–05	Ligue 1	31	3	6	1	3	0	11	1	51	5	
Auxerre	2005–06	Ligue 1	31	4	0	0	2	0	2	0	35	4	
Auxerre	2006–07	Ligue 1	35	9	1	0	2	0	6	1	44	10	
Auxerre	Total		126	20	11	1	10	0	24	2	171	23	–
Lens	2007–08	Ligue 1	9	0	0	0	0	0	6	3	15	3	
Lens	2009–10	Ligue 1	28	2	5	0	2	0	0	0	35	2	
Lens	2010–11	Ligue 1	30	3	0	0	1	0	0	0	31	3	
Lens	Total		67	5	5	0	3	0	6	3	81	8	–
Marseille (loan)	2007–08	Ligue 1	19	1	2	0	1	0	0	0	22	1	
Recreativo de Huelva (loan)	2008–09	La Liga	26	0	2	1	–		0	0	28	1	
Lekhwiya	2011–12	Qatar Stars League	2	0			–				2	0	
Panetolikos	2011–12	Super League Greece	9	0							9	0	
Arles-Avignon	2012–13	Ligue 2	4	0	2	0	0	0	–		6	0	
Career total			363	46	22	2	14	0	40	9	439	57	–

=== International ===
Appearances and goals by national team and year
National team	Year	Apps	Goals
Ivory Coast	2002	1	0
Ivory Coast	2003	5	0
Ivory Coast	2004	3	0
Ivory Coast	2005	4	1
Ivory Coast	2006	12	2
Ivory Coast	2007	2	0
Ivory Coast	2008	8	0
Total		35	3

Scores and results list the Ivory Coast's goal tally first, score column indicates score after each Akalé goal.

List of international goals scored by Kanga Akalé
No.	Date	Venue	Opponent	Score	Result	Competition
	4 June 2006	Bondoufle, France	Slovenia		3–0	Friendly
	14 June 2008	Gaborone, Botswana	Botswana		1–1	2010 FIFA World Cup Qualification

== Honours ==
Ivory Coast

- Africa Cup of Nations runner-up: 2006
