= Pascal Renfer =

Swiss footballer (born 1977)

Personal information
- Date of birth: 25 October 1977 (age 49)
- Height: 1.85 m (6 ft 1 in)
- Position: Forward

Senior career*
Years	Team	Apps	(Gls)
1998–1999	FC Solothurn	12	(1)
1999–2000	Yverdon-Sport	49	(8)
2001	FC Wangen bei Olten	14	(9)
2001	FC Winterthur	22	(16)
2002	FC Zürich	10	(0)
2002–2003	FC Thun	42	(6)
2004–2006	FC Winterthur	79	(48)
2006–2007	FC Schaffhausen	28	(0)
2007–2011	AC Lugano	53	(21)
2011–2012	FC Wohlen	35	(7)

International career
	Switzerland U19	1	(0)
- * Club domestic league appearances and goals

Pascal Renfer (born 25 October 1977) is a Swiss former professional footballer who played as forward.
