= Sergio Bastida =

Argentine-born Bolivian footballer (born 1979)

Personal information
- Full name: Sergio José Bastida
- Date of birth: 3 September 1979 (age 47)
- Place of birth: Rawson, Argentina
- Height: 1.72 m (5 ft 8 in)
- Position: Midfielder

Youth career
- Huracán
- Bolívar

Senior career*
Years	Team	Apps	(Gls)
1997–1998	Teplice	7	(0)
1998–1999	Chmel Blšany	1	(0)
1999–2002	AC Lugano	85	(22)
2002–2005	FC Zürich	31	(5)
2005–2006	APEP Pitsilia	26	(2)
2006–2007	Nea Salamis FC	24	(6)
2007–2010	FC Aarau	67	(3)
2010–2012	FC Wil	51	(8)
2012–2014	FC Wohlen	27	(1)
2014	→ SC Kriens (loan)	12	(6)
2014–2015	United Zürich	22	(3)
- * Club domestic league appearances and goals

Sergio José Bastida (born 3 September 1979) is an Argentine-Bolivian retired football player.
