= Johan Berisha =

Swiss footballer (born 1979)

Personal information
- Full name: Johan Berisha
- Date of birth: 6 September 1979 (age 47)
- Place of birth: Mitrovica, Kosovo, Yugoslavia
- Height: 1.89 m (6 ft 2 1/2 in)
- Position: Forward

Senior career*
Years	Team	Apps	(Gls)
1997–99	Neuchâtel Xamax	12	(0)
1999–01	FC Thun	70	(24)
2001–05	BSC Young Boys	63	(20)
2005–07	FC Aarau	19	(2)

International career^{‡}
?–2002	Switzerland U-21	12	(1)
- * Club domestic league appearances and goals as of 30 June 2007 ‡ National team caps and goals as of 28 July 2006

Johan Berisha (born 6 September 1979) is a retired Swiss footballer of Albanian descent.

== Football career ==
Berisha stands at 6"2 and he uses this height to his advantage when challenging defenders in aerial battles and his strength means that he can hold the ball up to bring teammates into play, making him useful when employed by his team as target man. However, his ball control and accurate passing also means that he can also be useful in a slightly deeper attacking midfield role, where he is able to get possession of the ball more often and create chances for his teammates. A relatively poor-scoring record is compensated for his contribution to the team in other areas, most notably the number of assists that he provides.

Berisha has previously played for Neuchâtel Xamax, FC Thun, BSC Young Boys and FC Aarau in the Swiss Super League.
