= Marc Zellweger =

Swiss footballer (born 1973)

Personal information
- Date of birth: 17 October 1973 (age 53)
- Place of birth: Winterthur, Switzerland
- Height: 1.81 m (5 ft 11 in)
- Position: Defender

Youth career
- FC Seuzach

Senior career*
Years	Team	Apps	(Gls)
1994–2001	St. Gallen	231	(18)
2001–2002	1. FC Köln	13	(1)
2002–2003	FC Wil	25	(1)
2003–2010	St. Gallen	287	(8)
2010–2012	SC Brühl	48	(6)
Total		604	(34)

International career
2000–2002	Switzerland	13	(0)
- * Club domestic league appearances and goals

Marc Zellweger (born 17 October 1973) is a Swiss former professional footballer who played as a defender. He spent most of his playing career at FC St. Gallen.
