= Patrick Baumann (footballer) =

Swiss footballer (born 1982)

Personal information
- Date of birth: 8 January 1982 (age 44)
- Place of birth: Lengnau BE, Switzerland
- Height: 1.83 m (6 ft 0 in)
- Position: Midfielder

Youth career
- 1986–1996: FC Lengnau
- 1996–1997: FC Biel/Bienne
- 1997–1998: Grasshopper

Senior career*
Years	Team	Apps	(Gls)
1998–2000	Grasshopper	12	(0)
1998–1999	→ Biel-Bienne (loan)	?	(?)
2001	Winterthur	7	(0)
2001–2002	Zürich	26	(0)
2002–2004	Thun	53	(5)
2004–2006	Neuchâtel Xamax	52	(1)
2006–2007	Thun	13	(0)
2007–2008	Grenchen	?	(?)

International career
?–2004	Switzerland U21	24	(3)
- * Club domestic league appearances and goals

Patrick Baumann (born 8 January 1982) is a Swiss former professional association football player.

In summer 2006, he signed a 1-year contract with FC Thun. But since the second half of the season was excluded in the squad. In 2007–08 season he joined 1. Liga side Grenchen, as Kurt Baumann the head coach of the team is his father.

He was a member of the Swiss U21 team at the 2004 UEFA European Under-21 Football Championship.
