= List of Switzerland international footballers =

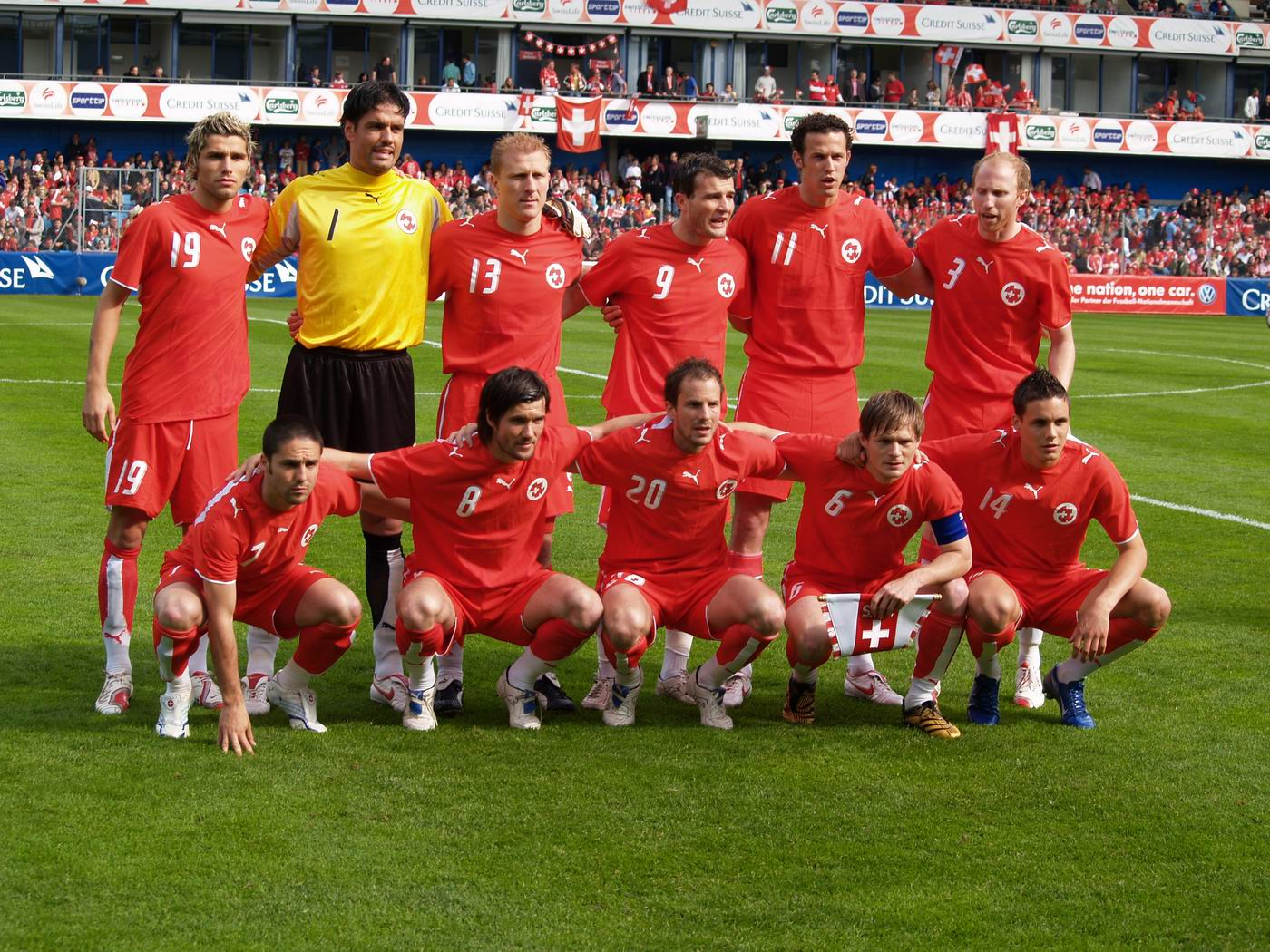
France (left) The Swiss line-up against China, just before World Cup 2006

The Swiss national football team (German: Schweizer Nati in German, French: La Nati, Italian: Squadra nazionale) represents the nation of Switzerland in international association football. It is fielded by the Swiss Football Association (German: Schweizerischer Fussballverband, French: Association Suisse de Football, Italian: Associazione Svizzera di Football), the governing body of football in Switzerland, and competes as a member of the Union of European Football Associations (UEFA), which encompasses the countries of Europe. The team played its first official international match on 12 February 1905 against France.

== List ==
Appearances and goals are composed of FIFA World Cup and UEFA European Championship matches and each competition's required qualification matches, as well as UEFA Nations League matches, FIFA Confederations Cup matches and numerous international friendly tournaments and matches.

Caps and goals updated as of 16 November 2026.

Player	Caps	Goals	First cap
Roggerio Nyakossi	1	0	16 November 2026
Samuel Ballet	2	0	13 November 2026
Zachary Athekame	6	0	26 September 2026
Sascha Britschgi	5	0	26 September 2026
Winsley Boteli	4	1	26 September 2026
Marvin Keller	1	0	31 May 2026
Adrian Bajrami	3	0	13 October 2025
Luca Jaquez	5	0	10 October 2025
Johan Manzambi	20	7	07 June 2025
Albian Hajdari	1	0	25 March 2025
Alvyn Sanches	7	1	21 March 2025
Lucas Blondel	4	0	21 March 2025
Isaac Schmidt	7	0	21 March 2025
Stefan Gartenmann	3	0	21 March 2025
Miro Muheim	13	0	18 November 2024
Aurèle Amenda	7	0	15 November 2024
Christian Witzig	1	0	15 October 2024
Joël Monteiro	7	2	8 September 2024
Gregory Wüthrich	2	0	5 September 2024
Kwadwo Duah	6	1	4 June 2024
Dereck Kutesa	3	0	26 March 2024
Vincent Sierro	17	1	26 March 2024
Filip Ugrinic	4	0	18 November 2023
Uran Bislimi	2	0	19 June 2023
Fabian Rieder	38	2	24 November 2022
Ardon Jashari	16	0	27 September 2022
Zeki Amdouni	39	15	27 September 2022
Dan Ndoye	42	12	24 September 2022
Leonidas Stergiou	6	0	12 June 2022
Mattia Bottani	1	0	5 June 2022
Kastriot Imeri	1	0	12 November 2021
Ulisses Garcia	11	0	1 September 2021
Gregor Kobel	31	0	1 September 2021
Andi Zeqiri	18	1	1 September 2021
Cédric Zesiger	6	0	1 September 2021
Jordan Lotomba	7	1	7 October 2020
Bećir Omeragić	7	0	7 October 2020
Jonas Omlin	4	0	7 October 2020
Simon Sohm	4	0	7 October 2020
Michel Aebischer	48	2	18 November 2019
Eray Cömert	24	0	18 November 2019
Cedric Itten	19	5	15 November 2019
Ruben Vargas	67	13	8 September 2019
Noah Okafor	26	2	9 June 2019
Loris Benito	13	1	14 November 2018
Léo Lacroix	1	0	14 November 2018
Yvon Mvogo	15	0	15 October 2018
Christian Fassnacht	24	5	12 October 2018
Albian Ajeti	11	1	8 September 2018
Kevin Mbabu	25	0	8 September 2018
Djibril Sow	61	0	8 September 2018
Dimitri Oberlin	1	0	23 March 2018
Manuel Akanji	92	4	9 June 2017
Florent Hadergjonaj	1	0	1 June 2017
Remo Freuler	100	12	25 March 2017
Steven Zuber	56	11	25 March 2017
Edimilson Fernandes	34	2	13 November 2016
Nico Elvedi	79	4	28 May 2016
Denis Zakaria	70	3	28 May 2016
Shani Tarashaj	5	0	25 March 2016
Roman Bürki	9	0	18 November 2015
Renato Steffen	41	4	9 October 2015
Luca Zuffi	4	0	9 October 2015
Marwin Hitz	2	0	10 June 2015
Breel Embolo	94	26	31 March 2015
François Moubandje	21	0	15 November 2014
Marco Schönbächler	2	0	15 November 2014
Silvan Widmer	65	5	14 October 2014
Fabian Lustenberger	3	0	15 November 2013
Pajtim Kasami	12	2	15 October 2013
Michael Lang	31	3	14 August 2013
Fabian Schär	86	8	14 August 2013
Haris Seferovic	93	25	6 February 2013
Izet Hajrović	1	0	14 November 2012
Josip Drmić	34	10	11 September 2012
Michel Morganella	2	0	30 May 2012
Yann Sommer	94	0	30 May 2012
Adrian Winter	1	0	30 May 2012
Alain Wiss	2	0	26 May 2012
Matías Vitkieviez	1	0	29 February 2012
Vincent Rüfli	1	0	15 November 2011
Fabian Frei	24	3	7 October 2011
Ricardo Rodríguez	150	10	7 October 2011
Gaetano Berardi	1	0	10 August 2011
Beg Ferati	1	0	10 August 2011
Timm Klose	17	0	10 August 2011
Johnny Leoni	1	0	10 August 2011
Innocent Emeghara	9	0	4 June 2011
Admir Mehmedi	76	10	4 June 2011
Granit Xhaka	152	18	4 June 2011
Mario Gavranović	41	16	26 March 2011
Scott Sutter	2	0	3 September 2010
François Affolter	5	0	11 August 2010
Nassim Ben Khalifa	4	0	11 August 2010
Moreno Costanzo	7	1	11 August 2010
Davide Chiumiento	1	0	3 March 2010
Jonathan Rossini	1	0	3 March 2010
Xherdan Shaqiri	125	32	3 March 2010
Heinz Barmettler	1	0	14 November 2009
Albert Bunjaku	6	0	14 November 2009
Pirmin Schwegler	14	0	12 August 2009
Marco Padalino	9	1	11 February 2009
Marco Wölfli	11	0	19 November 2008
Almen Abdi	6	0	20 August 2008
Sandro Burki	1	0	20 August 2008
Eldin Jakupović	1	0	20 August 2008
Alain Nef	4	1	20 August 2008
Valentin Stocker	36	6	20 August 2008
Eren Derdiyok	60	11	6 February 2008
Mario Eggimann	10	0	7 September 2007
Gelson Fernandes	67	2	22 August 2007
Stephan Lichtsteiner	108	8	15 November 2006
Steve von Bergen	50	0	6 September 2006
Gökhan Inler	89	7	2 September 2006
Alberto Regazzoni	3	0	2 September 2006
Diego Benaglio	61	0	3 June 2006
David Degen	17	0	27 May 2006
Fabio Coltorti	8	0	1 March 2006
Johan Djourou	76	2	1 March 2006
Blerim Džemaili	69	10	1 March 2006
Valon Behrami	83	2	8 October 2005
Mauro Lustrinelli	12	0	17 August 2005
Xavier Margairaz	18	1	4 June 2005
Alain Rochat	1	0	4 June 2005
Philippe Senderos	57	5	26 March 2005
Reto Ziegler	35	1	26 March 2005
Philipp Degen	32	0	9 February 2005
Tranquillo Barnetta	75	10	8 September 2004
Thomas Häberli	1	0	4 September 2004
Johan Vonlanthen	40	7	6 June 2004
Stéphane Grichting	45	1	28 April 2004
Daniel Gygax	35	5	31 March 2004
Marco Streller	37	12	11 October 2003
Benjamin Huggel	41	2	20 August 2003
Milaim Rama	7	0	20 August 2003
Christoph Spycher	47	0	30 April 2003
Stephan Keller	3	0	21 August 2002
Remo Meyer	5	0	21 August 2002
Fabrice Borer	3	0	13 February 2002
Bruno Berner	16	0	15 August 2001
Joël Magnin	1	0	2 June 2001
Alexander Frei	84	42	24 March 2001
Giorgio Contini	1	0	28 February 2001
André Muff	2	0	15 November 2000
Dario Rota	3	0	15 November 2000
Jorg Stiel	21	0	15 November 2000
Marc Zellweger	13	0	11 October 2000
Badile Lubamba	2	0	2 September 2000
Blaise N'Kufo	34	9	2 September 2000
Ricardo Cabanas	51	4	16 August 2000
Ludovic Magnin	63	3	16 August 2000
Andres Gerber	4	0	19 February 2000
Léonard Thurre	8	0	19 February 2000
Hakan Yakin	87	20	19 February 2000
Christophe Jaquet	3	0	9 October 1999
Sascha Müller	6	0	18 August 1999
Boris Smiljanić	3	0	18 August 1999
Patrick Bühlmann	17	1	18 November 1998
Marc Hodel	13	0	18 November 1998
Alexandre Rey	18	5	18 November 1998
Francesco Di Jorio	13	0	14 October 1998
Fabio Celestini	36	2	6 June 1998
Patrick Müller	81	3	22 April 1998
Sébastien Zambaz	4	0	20 August 1997
Johann Lonfat	24	1	6 August 1997
Marco Zwyssig	20	1	6 August 1997
Mario Cantaluppi	23	4	10 February 1997
Patrick De Napoli	4	0	10 February 1997
Antonio Esposito	3	0	10 February 1997
Andreas Hilfiker	8	0	10 February 1997
René Weiler	1	1	7 February 1997
Bernt Haas	36	3	6 October 1996
Massimo Lombardo	15	1	24 April 1996
Raphaël Wicky	75	1	24 April 1996
David Sesa	36	1	27 March 1996
Alexandre Comisetti	30	4	13 March 1996
Johann Vogel	94	2	8 March 1995
Giuseppe Mazzarelli	13	0	6 September 1994
Murat Yakin	49	4	6 September 1994
Pascal Zuberbühler	51	0	6 September 1994
Sébastien Fournier	40	3	22 January 1994
Ramon Vega	23	1	17 March 1993
Stéphane Henchoz	72	0	23 January 1993
Yvan Quentin	41	0	9 September 1992
Marco Pascolo	55	0	29 January 1992
Ciriaco Sforza	79	7	21 August 1991
Christophe Ohrel	56	6	21 August 1991
Marc Hottiger	64	5	11 October 1989
Adrian Knup	48	26	11 October 1989
Dominique Herr	52	4	20 September 1989
Stéphane Chapuisat	103	21	21 June 1989
Kubilay Türkyilmaz	64	34	2 February 1988
Christophe Bonvin	45	8	19 May 1987
Thomas Bickel	52	5	19 August 1986
Martin Brunner	36	0	9 April 1986
Alain Sutter	62	5	9 October 1985
Beat Sutter	61	13	7 September 1983
Georges Bregy	55	12	9 March 1982
Marcel Koller	58	3	9 March 1982
Marco Schällibaum	32	2	9 March 1982
Lucien Favre	24	1	1 September 1981
Martin Weber	32	1	30 May 1981
Alain Geiger	112	2	19 November 1980
André Egli	80	8	9 June 1979
Jean-Paul Brigger	36	4	5 May 1979
Alain Geiger	43	1	5 May 1979
Heinz Hermann	118	15	6 September 1978
Roger Wehrli	69	0	8 March 1978
René Botteron	65	2	9 June 1974
Erich Burgener	64	0	11 June 1973
Jakob Kuhn	64	5	11 November 1962
Kurt Leuenberger	5	0	24 November 1957
Josef Hügi	34	22	25 November 1951
Charles Antenen	56	22	20 June 1948
Jacques Fatton	53	28	11 May 1946
Alfred Bickel	71	11	18 June 1936
Severino Minelli	80	0	15 June 1930
André Abegglen	52	29	6 November 1927
Max Abegglen	68	34	19 November 1922
Rudolf Ramseyer	59	5	17 June 1920

== See also ==
- Current Squad
