= Hans Rüegsegger =

Swiss football manager

Personal information
- Date of birth: 6 May 1916
- Place of birth: Switzerland

Managerial career
- Years: Team
- 1951–1952: Solothurn
- 1954: Switzerland (caretaker)
- 1954–1957: Biel-Bienne

Hans Rüegsegger (born 6 May 1916, date of death unknown) was a Swiss football manager.

== Managerial career ==
From 1951 to 1952, Rüegsegger managed Solothurn. During the 1954 FIFA World Cup, Rüegsegger worked as a fitness coach for Switzerland under manager Karl Rappan. After Rappan's departure after the competition, Rüegsegger was named as caretaker manager, managing Switzerland twice, resulting in one draw and one loss. After his stint managing Switzerland, Rüegsegger returned to club management, managing Biel-Bienne for three years. On 6 January 1960, Rüegsegger was part of the Swiss coaching staff under Branislav Sekulić in a 3–0 loss against Italy.
