= Kurt Leuenberger =

Swiss footballer (1933–2000)

Personal information
- Date of birth: 15 November 1933
- Date of death: 2000 (aged 66–67)

International career
Years	Team	Apps	(Gls)
1957–1960	Switzerland	5	(0)

Kurt Leuenberger (15 November 1933 – 2000) was a Swiss footballer. He played in five matches for the Switzerland national football team from 1957 to 1960.
