= François Dégerine =

Swiss footballer and manager (1870–1948)

Personal information
- Full name: François Jean Dégerine
- Date of birth: 31 March 1870
- Place of birth: Geneva, Switzerland
- Date of death: 26 March 1948 (aged 77)
- Place of death: Geneva, Switzerland

Senior career*
Years	Team	Apps	(Gls)
- Stellula
1897–1903	Servette		

Managerial career
- 1908–1909: Switzerland
- * Club domestic league appearances and goals

François Jean Dégerine (31 March 1870 – 26 March 1948) was a Swiss football player and manager.

== Playing career ==
Dégerine took up football, joining Geneva-based club Stellula in the 1890s, after playing rugby and being a part of the Bicycle-Club Genève cycling club. In 1897, Dégerine joined Servette, helping the club transition from rugby to football. Dégerine left Servette in 1903.

== Managerial career ==
Dégerine became Switzerland's first official manager in 1908, following the Swiss Football Association's management of the team. Over the course of little over a year, Dégerine managed Switzerland four times, winning once and losing three times.
