= Switzerland national football team =

Men's national association football team representing Switzerland

Switzerland
- Nickname(s): Nati (National Team); Rossocrociati (Red Crosses)
- Association: Swiss Football Association (ASF-SFV)
- Confederation: UEFA (Europe)
- Head coach: Murat Yakin
- Captain: Granit Xhaka
- Most caps: Granit Xhaka (152)
- Top scorer: Alexander Frei (42)
- Home stadium: Various
- FIFA code: SUI
First colours	Second colours

FIFA ranking
- Current: 12 ▲2 (18 November 2026)
- Highest: 3 (August 1993)
- Lowest: 83 (December 1998)

First international
- France 1–0 Switzerland (Paris, France; 12 February 1905)

Biggest win
- Switzerland 9–0 Lithuania (Paris, France; 25 May 1924)

Biggest defeat
- Switzerland 0–9 England (Basel, Switzerland; 20 May 1909); Hungary 9–0 Switzerland (Budapest, Hungary; 29 October 1911)

World Cup
- Appearances: 13 (first in 1934)
- Best result: Quarter-finals (1934, 1938, 1954, 2026)

European Championship
- Appearances: 6 (first in 1996)
- Best result: Quarter-finals (2020, 2024)

Nations League Finals
- Appearances: 1 (first in 2019)
- Best result: Fourth place (2019)
Medal record
Olympic Games
Silver medal – second place	1924 Paris	Team

The Switzerland national football team (German: Schweizer Fussballnationalmannschaft, Italian: Nazionale di calcio della Svizzera, French: Équipe nationale suisse de football, Romansh: Squadra naziunala da ballape da la Svizra, Latin: Turma Pediludica Nationalis Helvetica) represents Switzerland in men's international football. The national team is controlled by the Swiss Football Association.

Switzerland's best performances at the FIFA World Cup have been four quarter-final appearances, in 1934, 1938, 1954 and 2026. They hosted the competition in 1954, where they played against Austria in their quarter-final match, losing 7–5, which still stands as the highest scoring World Cup match ever. At the 2006 FIFA World Cup, Switzerland set a FIFA World Cup record by being eliminated from the tournament despite not conceding a single goal, being eliminated by Ukraine after penalties in the round of 16. They did not concede a goal until a match against Chile at the 2010 World Cup, conceding in the 75th minute, setting a World Cup tournament record for consecutive minutes without conceding a goal.

Switzerland and Austria were the co-hosts of UEFA Euro 2008, where the Swiss made their third appearance in the competition, but failed for a third time to progress from the group stage. However, since then, the Swiss made it to the round of 16 during Euro 2016, and achieved a record-best quarter-final showing at Euro 2020 after eliminating world champions France. They then repeated this feat at Euro 2024, this time beating reigning champions Italy.

Overall, Switzerland's best ever result at an official football competition was the silver medal they earned in 1924, after losing to Uruguay 3–0 in the finals of the 1924 Olympic Games.

== History ==
=== 1924–1966: early years, World Cup host nation ===
The Uruguay v. Switzerland line-up in the Gold medal match at the 1924 Summer Olympics, held in Paris

At the 1924 Paris Olympic Games, Switzerland finished with a silver medal after losing to Uruguay in the final, losing 3–0. The team's debut appearance at the World Cup was in 1934, where they reached the quarterfinals after beating the Netherlands 3–2 in the round of sixteen before getting knocked out by Czechoslovakia. Switzerland once again reached the quarterfinals in 1938, after beating Germany in the round of sixteen, winning 4–2 after a replay but were knocked out by Hungary, losing 2–0. At the 1950 World Cup, Switzerland were drawn in a group with Brazil, Yugoslavia and Mexico, where they lost 4–0 to Yugoslavia in the opening match, drew 2–2 with Brazil in their second match and beating Mexico 2–1 in their final group mach, and finished third in their group. On 22 July 1946, Switzerland was awarded the right to host the 1954 World Cup unopposed, in Luxembourg City. At the World Cup, Switzerland finished second in their group behind England; beating Italy and losing to England, but qualified for the quarterfinals after beating Italy in a group play-off. They were knocked out of the tournament after losing 7–5 to Austria. At the 1962 World Cup, Switzerland finished bottom of the group, losing all three games, losing 3–1 to Chile, 2–1 to West Germany and 3–0 to Italy. A similar result occurred at the 1966 World Cup, where Switzerland again finished at the bottom of their group losing all three of their matches, 5–0 to West Germany, 2–1 to Spain and 2–0 to Argentina.

=== 1992–1996: the Roy Hodgson era ===
In 1992, Switzerland appointed English manager Roy Hodgson as head coach of the national team; at the time of his appointment, the Swiss had not qualified for any major tournament since 1966. Under his guidance, Switzerland rose to 3rd in the FIFA World Ranking in August 1993, which still remains their highest FIFA ranking to this day. Hodgson led Switzerland to the 1994 FIFA World Cup, losing just one game during qualifying, in a group that included Italy, Portugal, and Scotland. The Swiss won their home tie with Italy, and in the away game, took a 2–0 lead before being pegged back to a 2–2 draw, and also took four points from Scotland, winning 3–1 at home and drawing 1–1 away. Against the Portuguese, Switzerland drew 1–1 at home and lost 1–0 in the away fixture in Porto, their only defeat of the qualifying campaign. Their opening match against hosts United States, on 18 June 1994, was played indoors at the Pontiac Silverdome in Detroit, and the two teams drew 1–1 in the opening match of the World Cup. In the next match, they won 4–1 over Romania, and in their final game against Colombia, the Swiss lost 2–0. Nevertheless, Switzerland still qualified from the group, but were knocked out by Spain, losing 3–0.

=== 2000–2008: the Köbi Kuhn era ===
At UEFA Euro 1996, Switzerland once again easily qualified for the tournament hosted in England, as they topped their qualifying group, losing just once, which was a 1–2 defeat to Turkey. They were drawn in Group A, but their tournament was disappointing overall; as they finished bottom of the group. Their opening match was against hosts England, and the two sides drew 1–1. In their second match, they lost 2–0 to the Netherlands, and in their final group game, lost 1–0 to Scotland. Switzerland failed to qualify for the 1998 FIFA World Cup, hosted in France, as they finished fourth in their qualifying group, winning three games; 3–2 against Finland, 1–0 against Hungary and 5–0 against Azerbaijan, drawing one game against Hungary (1–1), and losing three games; 1–0 against Azerbaijan and losing both games against Norway, losing 1–0 at home and 5–0 away.

In qualifying for UEFA Euro 2004, Switzerland finished top of a group that featured Russia, the Republic of Ireland, Albania and Georgia. The Swiss finished with 21 points and qualified for the finals in Portugal, where they were drawn in Group B with defending champions France, England and Croatia. They began the tournament with a 0–0 draw with Croatia before succumbing to a 3–0 defeat to England in the next match. They lost their final match against France; losing 3–1 and finishing bottom of the group. Their only goal of the entire tournament was scored by Johan Vonlanthen, who became the youngest ever goalscorer at the Euros when he scored the equalizing goal against France; surpassing the previous record set only four days earlier by Wayne Rooney by three months.

The Swiss managed to qualify for the 2006 FIFA World Cup, overcoming Turkey by the away goals rule in Istanbul, the country's first World Cup since 1994. In the tournament, Switzerland was drawn in Group G with former world champions France, 2002 World Cup's fourth-place finisher South Korea and debutant Togo. In their first encounter, Switzerland bravely held the mighty France and Zinedine Zidane 0–0, before overcoming the Togolese 2–0 in the second match, tied with the South Koreans four points, however the Swiss were inferior to the Koreans by number of goals scored, meaning that the last game a must-win. The Swiss then managed to beat South Korea 2–0 in the final match, occupying first place in their group while knocking the Asians out of the tournament. In the round of sixteen, Switzerland faced Ukraine, but lost on penalty shootout in a match that has been criticized as the worst game in World Cup history. Yet, Switzerland was the only team to be eliminated without conceding a single goal.

Switzerland, along with Austria, were chosen as co-hosts of UEFA Euro 2008. The Swiss were drawn in Group A with Portugal, Turkey and the Czech Republic. Their opening match was a 1–0 loss to the Czech Republic, followed by a 1–2 defeat to Turkey. Their third match was against Portugal, with Switzerland winning 2–0 to ensure that Portugal would top their group with a defeat.

=== 2008–2014: the Ottmar Hitzfeld era ===
In their first match at the 2010 FIFA World Cup, the team defeated eventual champions Spain 1–0 with a goal by Gelson Fernandes, but they were still eliminated in the group stage. In the second match, a goal scored by Mark González in the 75th minute of the game against Chile ended a 559-minute streak without conceding a goal in World Cup matches, beating the record previously held by Italy by nine minutes. Switzerland did not advance further than the group after a 0–0 draw with Honduras in the third and final group match.

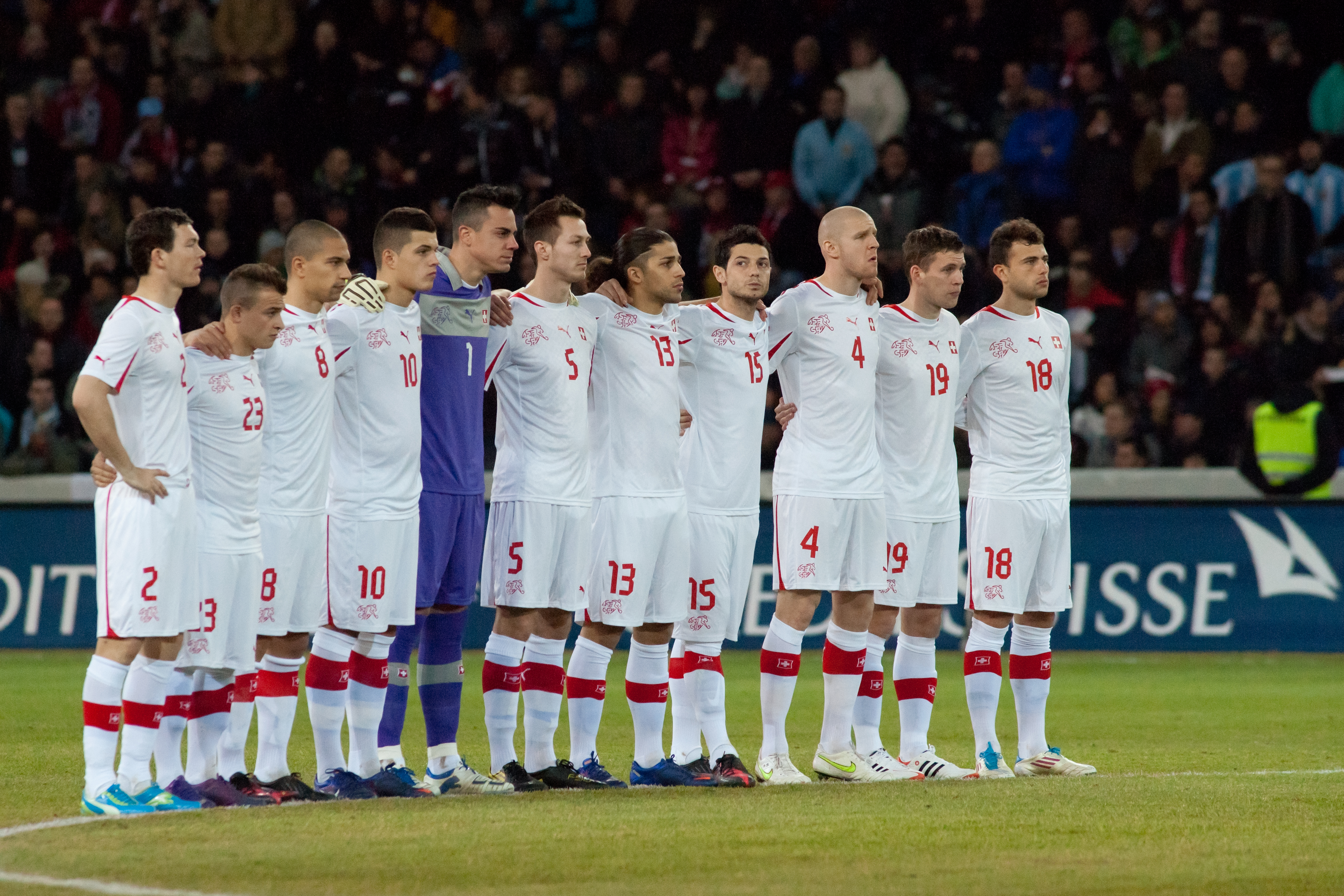
The Switzerland national team line-up before a friendly match against Argentina, 29 February 2012. Switzerland lost 1–3.

Switzerland did not qualify for UEFA Euro 2012; missing out on the tournament for the first time in a decade, as they finished third in the qualifying group, a group featuring England, Montenegro, Wales and Bulgaria. Switzerland's initial start in qualifying was overall poor; losing 1–3 to England in the first game played, in which Xherdan Shaqiri scored his first goal for the national team, followed by a 1–0 defeat to Montenegro. Switzerland then recorded a 4–1 win over Wales before consecutive draws against Bulgaria (0–0) and England (2–2). Switzerland's hopes of qualifying were restored with a 3–1 win over Bulgaria, with a hat-trick from Xherdan Shaqiri. However, following a 2–0 loss to Wales (in which Reto Ziegler earned a red card) and Montenegro's surprising last-minute equalizer against England in a 2–2 draw, Switzerland's hopes of qualifying were mathematically made impossible. In the final game, Switzerland earned redemption against Montenegro as they came out with a 2–0 win. Switzerland's top goalscorer during the qualifying period was Xherdan Shaqiri, with 4 goals.

At the 2014 FIFA World Cup in Brazil, Switzerland were drawn to play France, Honduras and Ecuador in the group stage. They advanced to the round of sixteen with a 3–0 win over Honduras, with a hat-trick from Xherdan Shaqiri. In the knockout match against Argentina, they lost 1–0, conceding to Ángel Di María in the 118th minute.

=== 2016–2021: the Vladimir Petković era ===
At Euro 2016, Switzerland were selected to play in Group A of the tournament; alongside hosts France, Albania and Romania. In the first game, Switzerland won 1–0 over Albania, with the only goal being scored by Fabian Schär in the fifth minute of the game. The next match was a 1–1 draw with Romania, with Switzerland initially conceding from a penalty but equalizing in the second half following a goal from Admir Mehmedi. The final group game was against France, drawing 0–0. However, the game spread notoriety for several Swiss players' jerseys being ripped during challenges with the French players, and also for the ball bursting during a challenge between Antoine Griezmann and Valon Behrami when they both converged on the ball, with the game also attracting attention for its poor surface, which was criticised by both coaches and players of the two teams; after the game, Switzerland's kit manufacturer had blamed "faulty material" for the incidents regarding the jerseys being ripped. Switzerland, due to the draw, finished second in the group to set up a tie against Poland in the round of sixteen; initially the Swiss conceded but managed to find a late equalizer from Xherdan Shaqiri, who scored a bicycle-kick to send the game into extra-time, but the Swiss were knocked out as Granit Xhaka had missed the second penalty during the penalty shootout, as all other players managed to convert their penalties, with Poland winning 5–4 on penalties to go through and knock out the Swiss. In qualifying for the 2018 FIFA World Cup, Switzerland were drawn with Portugal, Hungary, Faroe Islands, Latvia and Andorra. The Swiss began their qualifying group with a shock 2–0 win over European champions Portugal, who had won the tournament less than two months prior to playing with them on 6 September. Afterwards, they beat Hungary 2–3, Andorra 2–1, Faroe Islands 2–0, Latvia 1–0 in the first five games, leading the group on maximum points. In the reverse fixtures, they beat Faroe Islands 2–0, Andorra 3–0, Latvia 3–0 and Hungary 5–2, before facing Portugal in the final group game, where they lost 2–0, meaning they would have to play in the play-offs; where they were ranked as the best second-placed team, and were drawn to play Northern Ireland. In the first leg, played on 9 November, they won 1–0 through a controversial penalty scored by Ricardo Rodríguez, and three days later played in the second leg, drawing 0–0 and advancing to the World Cup finals in Russia with a 1–0 aggregate win. Before the World Cup, Switzerland were ranked 6th in the world ranking, even ranking higher than eventual World Cup winners France.

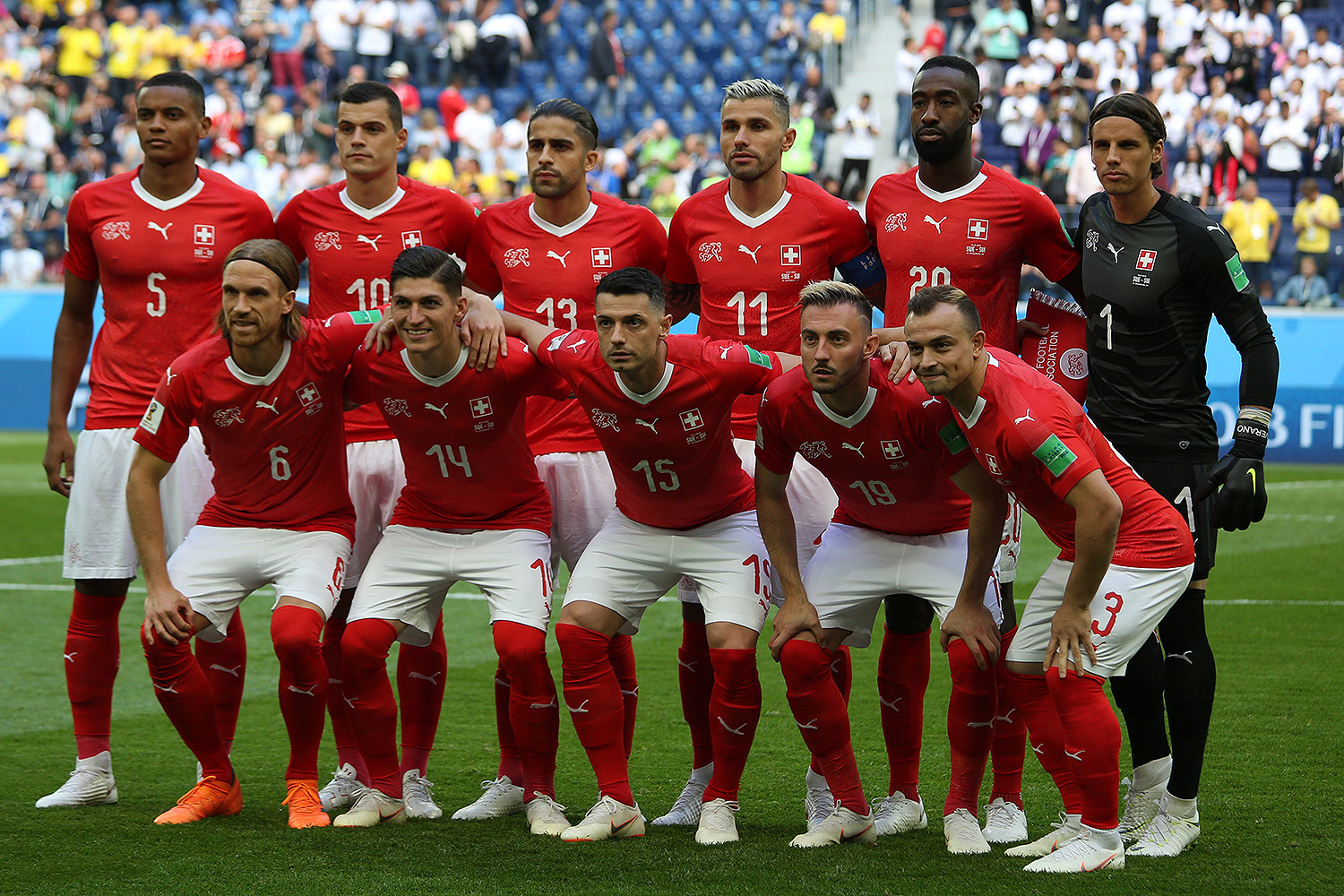
The Switzerland national team line-up before the game against Sweden, on 3 July 2018, in Saint Petersburg

At the World Cup, Switzerland were drawn to play Brazil, Serbia and Costa Rica in Group E. They began their campaign with a 1–1 draw with Brazil, before beating Serbia 2–1 through a late winning goal from Xherdan Shaqiri. The game with Serbia sparked controversy for the celebrations performed by goalscorers Xherdan Shaqiri and Granit Xhaka (both ethnic Albanians), along with Stephan Lichtsteiner as the trio performed a celebration where they crossed their hands to depict a double-headed eagle, the official emblem of Albania, considered by many as an Albanian nationalist symbol, however, they were not banned by FIFA for this. Their final group game was with Costa Rica; which they drew 2–2, with Blerim Džemaili and Josip Drmić scoring; thus finishing second in the group. They were drawn to play Sweden in the round of sixteen, a fixture they lost 1–0, getting knocked out of the tournament.

On 23 January 2018, Switzerland were selected to play in the inaugural edition of the UEFA Nations League, a tournament contested by all UEFA member's national teams, being drawn to play in League A, in Group 2, against Belgium and Iceland.

At Euro 2020, postponed to 2021 due to COVID-19, Switzerland finished third in Group A which contained Italy, Wales and Turkey; however, they managed to qualify to the knockout stage as one of the best third-placed teams. In the round of 16, they defeated World Cup champions France on penalties, after finishing 3–3 and overcoming a 1–3 second half deficit, to have their first knockout phase win in a major tournament since the 1938 World Cup. In the subsequent quarterfinal game against Spain, they once again took the game to penalties, after trailing 1–0. However, after converting only one of their four penalties, they exited the tournament at this stage.

=== 2021–present: the Murat Yakin era ===
On 9 August 2021, Murat Yakin became the manager of the Swiss national team. During the 2022 World Cup qualification, Switzerland finished in the first place ahead of Italy in Group C, which granted them a spot in the 2022 FIFA World Cup in Qatar. During the World Cup, Switzerland finished second in Group G to qualify the round of 16, where they lost 6–1 to Portugal. In 2023, Switzerland played against Romania, Israel, Belarus, Kosovo, and Andorra to qualify for Euro 2024. The Swiss finished second behind Romania.

The Euro 2024 tournament was a major success for Switzerland, as they finished second in their group with 5 points, moving onto the Round of 16. During the Round of 16, Switzerland caused a major upset by defeating defending champions Italy and reaching the quarterfinals for the second time in their history.

In the 2026 FIFA World Cup qualification, Switzerland played against Kosovo, Slovenia, and Sweden to qualify for the 2026 FIFA World Cup and finished first in their group. In the actual tournament, it was another major success for Switzerland. They finished first in their group with 7 points, ahead of co-hosts Canada, and proceeded to the newly formed Round of 32, where they beat Algeria. They then defeated Colombia on penalties in the Round of 16, reaching the quarter-finals for the first time since 1954. In the quarter-finals, Switzerland lost to defending champions Argentina. After an equalizer by Dan Ndoye tied the game 1–1, Breel Embolo received a second yellow card minutes later for simulation and was sent off by Portuguese referee João Pinheiro following a VAR review, which reduced the team to 10 men and ultimately resulted in a 3–1 defeat after extra time. Weeks later, the International Football Association Board (IFAB) ruled that the VAR protocol had been misapplied and Embolo should not have been sent off, which cleared him to play in the 2026–27 UEFA Nations League matches against North Macedonia and Scotland without any carryover suspension from the tournament.

== Team image ==
=== Kit ===
The Switzerland national team's traditional home kit is red shirts, white shorts and red socks, with the away kit being reverse with white shirts, red shorts and white socks, although all-red and all-white kits are not uncommon. Switzerland, since being established in 1895, have always had the same colour code, as tradition and homage to the national colours which are derived from the Swiss flag. The current kit manufacturer is Puma, who have made their kits since 1998.

==== Kit sponsorship ====
Supplier	Period
(France) Le Coq Sportif	1970–1975
(West Germany) Adidas	1976–1989
(Switzerland) Blacky	1990–1992
(Italy) Lotto	1993–1997
(Germany) Puma	1998–present

== Results and fixtures ==
The following is a list of match results in the last 12 months, as well as any future matches that have been scheduled.

Win Draw Loss Fixture

=== 2026 ===
27 March Friendly	Switzerland	3–4	Germany	Basel, Switzerland
20:45 UTC+1	Ndoye 17'; Embolo 41'; Monteiro 79'	Report	Tah 26'; Gnabry 45+2'; Wirtz 61', 85'	Stadium: St. Jakob-Park; Attendance: 34,316; Referee: Chris Kavanagh (England)

31 March Friendly	Norway	0–0	Switzerland	Oslo, Norway
18:00 UTC+2		Report		Stadium: Ullevaal Stadion; Attendance: 23,913; Referee: Jasper Vergoote (Belgium)

31 May Friendly	Switzerland	4–1	Jordan	St. Gallen, Switzerland
15:00 UTC+2	Embolo 28' (pen.); Ndoye 33'; Xhaka 45+10' (pen.); Fassnacht 79'	Report	Al-Fakhouri 52'	Stadium: Kybunpark; Attendance: 13,380; Referee: Rohit Saggi (Norway)

6 June Friendly	Switzerland	1–1	Australia	San Diego, United States
12:00 UTC−7	Ndoye 14'	Report	Yengi 56'	Stadium: Snapdragon Stadium; Attendance: 6,107; Referee: Katja Koroleva (United States)

13 June 2026 World Cup GS	Qatar	1–1	Switzerland	Santa Clara, United States
12:00 UTC−7	Muheim 90+4' (o.g.)	Report	Embolo 17' (pen.)	Stadium: Levi's Stadium; Attendance: 67,966; Referee: Saíd Martínez (Honduras)

18 June 2026 World Cup GS	Switzerland	4–1	Bosnia and Herzegovina	Inglewood, United States
12:00 UTC−7	Manzambi 74', 90'; Vargas 84'; Xhaka 90+7' (pen.)	Report	Mahmić 90+3'	Stadium: SoFi Stadium; Attendance: 70,026; Referee: João Pinheiro (Portugal)

24 June 2026 World Cup GS	Switzerland	2–1	Canada	Vancouver, Canada
12:00 UTC−7	Vargas 46'; Manzambi 57'	Report	P. David 76'	Stadium: BC Place; Attendance: 52,497; Referee: Ramon Abatti (Brazil)

2 July 2026 World Cup R32	Switzerland	2–0	Algeria	Vancouver, Canada
20:00 UTC−7	Embolo 10'; Ndoye 46'	Report		Stadium: BC Place; Attendance: 52,497; Referee: Yael Falcón (Argentina)

7 July 2026 World Cup R16	Switzerland	0–0 (a.e.t.) (4–3 p)	Colombia	Vancouver, Canada
13:00 UTC−7		Report		Stadium: BC Place; Attendance: 52,497; Referee: Iván Barton (El Salvador)
	Penalties
	Xhaka (penalty scored); Amdouni (penalty scored); Akanji (penalty missed); Itten (penalty scored); Vargas (penalty scored)		(penalty scored) Quintero; (penalty missed) Sánchez; (penalty scored) Campaz; (penalty missed) Hernández; (penalty scored) Díaz

11 July 2026 World Cup QF	Argentina	3–1 (a.e.t.)	Switzerland	Kansas City, United States
20:00 UTC−5	Mac Allister 10'; Alvarez 112'; La. Martínez 120+1'	Report	Ndoye 67'	Stadium: Arrowhead Stadium; Attendance: 69,045; Referee: João Pinheiro (Portugal)

26 September 2026–27 Nations League	North Macedonia	0–3	Switzerland	Skopje, North Macedonia
20:45 UTC+2		Report	Freuler 22'; Amdouni 41', 74'	Stadium: Toše Proeski Arena; Attendance: 11,474; Referee: Daniel Schlager (Germany)

29 September 2026–27 Nations League	Scotland	0–3	Switzerland	Glasgow, Scotland
19:45 UTC+1		Report	Rodriguez 12'; Elvedi 55'; Amdouni 82'	Stadium: Hampden Park; Attendance: 41,028; Referee: Nenad Minaković (Serbia)

3 October 2026–27 Nations League	Switzerland	2–1	Slovenia	Lucerne, Switzerland
20:45 UTC+2	Janža 10' (o.g.); Ndoye 38'	Report	Vipotnik 2'	Stadium: Thermoplan Arena; Attendance: 15,240; Referee: Ivan Kružliak (Slovakia)

6 October 2026–27 Nations League	Switzerland	3–0	North Macedonia	Lucerne, Switzerland
20:45 UTC+2	Rieder 43'; Manzambi 73'; Ndoye 81'	Report		Stadium: Thermoplan Arena; Attendance: 15,730; Referee: Edgars Maļcevs (Latvia)

13 November 2026–27 Nations League	Slovenia	0–0	Switzerland	Maribor, Slovenia
20:45 UTC+1		Report		Stadium: Ljudski vrt Attendance: 10,500; Referee: Jasper Vergoote (Belgium)

16 November 2026–27 Nations League	Switzerland	4–0	Scotland	St.Gallen, Switzerland
20:45 UTC+1	Ferguson 22' (o.g.); Boteli 47'; Sanches 51'; Amdouni 89'	Report		Stadium: Sitterstadion; Attendance: 17,742; Referee: Danny Makkelie (Netherlands)

== Coaching staff ==
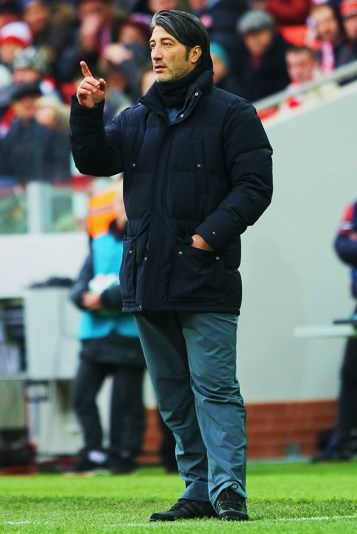
Current head coach Murat Yakin

Position	Name
Head coach	(Switzerland) Murat Yakin
Assistant coach	(Switzerland) Davide Callà
Goalkeeping coach	(Switzerland) Patrick Foletti
Fitness coach	(Switzerland) Oliver Riedwyl
Doctor	(Switzerland) Ludwig Scholzer
Physiotherapist	(Switzerland) Marcel Müllenberger
Match analyst	(Switzerland) Kevin Ehmes
Masseur	(Switzerland) Wolfgang Frei
Nutritionist	(Switzerland) Antonio Molina
Chef	(Switzerland) Francesco Baraldo Sano
Team coordinator	(Switzerland) Diego Benaglio

=== Coaching history ===
As of 16 November 2026

Nat	Name	Record						
Nat	Name	Period	G	W	D	L	%	Major competitions
(Switzerland)	François Dégerine	1908 – 1909	3	1	0	2	33.33	
(Switzerland)	Referee's Commission	1910 – 1924	0	0	0	0	—	
(England)	Jimmy Hogan	1924	6	4	1	1	66.67	
(Switzerland)	Selection's Commission	14 December 1924 – 25 March 1934; 14 October 1934 – 17 May 1937; 18 September 1938 – 1 January 1941; 15 October 1950 – 20 September 1952	45	9	8	28	20.00	
(Switzerland)	Heinrich Müller	1934	2	1	0	1	50.00	1934 World Cup – Quarterfinals
(Austria)	Karl Rappan	19 September 1937 – 12 June 1938; 1 February 1942 – 2 October 1949; 1 July 1953 – 30 June 1954; 27 March 1960 – 11 November 1963	36	10	5	21	27.78	1938 World Cup – Quarterfinals; 1954 World Cup – Quarterfinals; 1962 World Cup – Group stage 1964 European Championship – Failed to qualify
(Switzerland)	Franco Andreoli	19 March 1950 – 22 November 1950	6	2	2	2	33.33	1950 World Cup – Group stage
(Switzerland)	Hans Rüegsegger	19 September 1954 – 10 October 1954	1	0	0	1	0.00	
(Switzerland)	Jacques Spagnoli	1 May 1955 – 26 May 1958	8	1	2	5	12.50	1958 World Cup – Failed to qualify
(Austria)	Willibald Hahn	20 September 1958 – 25 October 1959	2	0	0	2	0.00	
(Czechoslovakia) (Switzerland)	Jiří Sobotka	15 April 1964 – 10 May 1964	3	1	0	2	33.33	
(Italy)	Alfredo Foni	1 July 1964 – 5 January 1967; 1 October 1967 – 23 December 1967	19	4	3	12	21.05	1966 World Cup – Group stage 1968 European Championship – Failed to qualify
(Switzerland)	Erwin Ballabio	14 February 1968 – 3 November 1969	17	5	4	8	29.41	1970 World Cup – Failed to qualify
(Switzerland)	René Hüssy	22 April 1970 – 3 May 1970; 22 June 1973 – 8 September 1976	26	6	4	16	23.08	1976 European Championship – Failed to qualify
(Switzerland)	Louis Maurer	1 July 1970 – 30 June 1972	10	5	2	3	50.00	1972 European Championship – Failed to qualify
(Switzerland)	Bruno Michaud	26 April 1972 – 9 May 1973	7	1	5	1	14.29	1974 World Cup – Failed to qualify
(Socialist Federal Republic of Yugoslavia)	Miroslav Blažević	22 September 1976 – 9 October 1976	2	0	0	2	0.00	
(Switzerland)	Roger Vonlanthen	28 February 1977 – 28 March 1979	15	4	1	10	26.67	1978 World Cup – Failed to qualify 1980 European Championship – Failed to qualify
(Switzerland)	Léon Walker	5 May 1979 – 21 December 1980	16	4	1	11	25.00	
(Switzerland)	Paul Wolfisberg	1 January 1981 – 31 December 1985; 20 June 1989 – 22 June 1989	51	17	20	14	33.33	1982 World Cup – Failed to qualify 1984 European Championship – Failed to qualify 1986 World Cup – Failed to qualify
(France) (Switzerland)	Daniel Jeandupeux	12 March 1986 – 26 April 1989	28	8	8	12	28.57	1988 European Championship – Failed to qualify 1990 World Cup – Failed to qualify
(Germany)	Uli Stielike	1 July 1989 – 31 December 1991	25	13	5	7	52.00	1992 European Championship – Failed to qualify
(England)	Roy Hodgson	1 July 1992 – 30 November 1995	41	21	10	10	51.22	1994 World Cup – Round of 16
(Portugal)	Artur Jorge	13 March 1996 – 18 June 1996	7	1	2	4	14.29	1996 European Championship – Group stage
(Austria) (Switzerland)	Rolf Fringer	15 August 1996 – 14 October 1997	11	5	1	5	45.45	1998 World Cup – Failed to qualify
(France) (Switzerland)	Gilbert Gress	1 July 1998 – 31 December 1999	18	6	6	6	33.33	2000 European Championship – Failed to qualify
(Switzerland)	Hans-Peter Zaugg	19 February 2000 – 26 April 2000	4	1	2	1	25.00	
(Argentina)	Enzo Trossero	14 July 2000 – 8 June 2001	11	3	4	4	27.27	2002 World Cup – Failed to qualify
(Switzerland)	Jakob "Köbi" Kuhn	11 September 2001 – 30 June 2008	73	32	18	23	43.84	2004 European Championship – Group stage 2006 World Cup – Round of 16; 2008 European Championship – Group stage
(Germany)	Ottmar Hitzfeld	1 July 2008 – 1 July 2014	61	30	18	13	49.18	2010 World Cup – Group stage 2012 European Championship – Failed to qualify 2014 World Cup – Round of 16
(Bosnia and Herzegovina) (Switzerland)	Vladimir Petković	1 August 2014 – 27 July 2021	78	42	14	22	53.85	2016 European Championship – Round of 16; 2018 World Cup – Round of 16; 2020 European Championship – Quarterfinals
(Switzerland)	Murat Yakin	9 August 2021 – present	71	33	24	14	46.48	2022 World Cup – Round of 16; 2024 European Championship – Quarterfinals; 2026 World Cup – Quarterfinals

== Players ==
=== Current squad ===
The following 24 players were called up to the 2026–27 UEFA Nations League B matches against Slovenia on 13 November and Scotland on 16 November 2026.

Caps and goals updated as of 16 November 2026, after the match against Scotland.

No.	Pos.	Player	Date of birth (age)	Caps	Goals	Club
1	GK	Gregor Kobel	6 December 1997 (age 28)	31	0	(German Football Association) Borussia Dortmund
12	GK	Yvon Mvogo	6 June 1994 (age 32)	15	0	(French Football Federation) Lorient
21	GK	Marvin Keller	3 July 2002 (age 24)	1	0	(Swiss Football Association) Young Boys
	GK	Silas Huber	10 July 2005 (age 21)	0	0	(Swiss Football Association) Zürich
13	DF	Ricardo Rodriguez	25 August 1992 (age 34)	150	10	(Italian Football Federation) Torino
	DF	Manuel Akanji	19 July 1995 (age 31)	92	4	(Italian Football Federation) Inter Milan
4	DF	Nico Elvedi	30 September 1996 (age 30)	79	4	(The Football Association) Leeds United
18	DF	Eray Cömert	4 February 1998 (age 28)	24	0	(Italian Football Federation) Torino
17	DF	Isaac Schmidt	7 December 1999 (age 26)	7	0	(Swiss Football Association) Young Boys
16	DF	Zachary Athekame	13 December 2004 (age 21)	6	0	(French Football Federation) Lyon
2	DF	Sascha Britschgi	27 August 2006 (age 20)	5	0	(Italian Football Federation) Parma
3	DF	Adrian Bajrami	5 April 2002 (age 24)	3	0	(Portuguese Football Federation) Braga
5	DF	Roggerio Nyakossi	14 January 2004 (age 22)	1	0	(Royal Belgian Football Association) OH Leuven
8	MF	Remo Freuler	15 April 1992 (age 34)	100	12	(Hellenic Football Federation) Olympiacos
6	MF	Denis Zakaria	20 November 1996 (age 30)	70	3	(French Football Federation) Monaco (Note: Monaco is a Monégasque club playing in the French football league system.)
15	MF	Djibril Sow	6 February 1997 (age 29)	61	0	(Italian Football Federation) Genoa
20	MF	Michel Aebischer	6 January 1997 (age 29)	48	2	(German Football Association) Union Berlin
22	MF	Fabian Rieder	16 February 2002 (age 24)	38	2	(German Football Association) FC Augsburg
	MF	Johan Manzambi	14 October 2005 (age 21)	20	7	(The Football Association) Aston Villa
14	MF	Ardon Jashari	30 July 2002 (age 24)	16	0	(Italian Football Federation) AC Milan
23	MF	Alvyn Sanches	12 February 2003 (age 23)	7	1	(Swiss Football Association) Young Boys
7	FW	Breel Embolo	14 February 1997 (age 29)	94	26	(United States Soccer Federation) Atlanta United
	FW	Rubén Vargas	5 August 1998 (age 28)	67	13	(Royal Spanish Football Federation) Sevilla
	FW	Dan Ndoye	25 October 2000 (age 26)	42	12	(The Football Association) Nottingham Forest
10	FW	Zeki Amdouni	4 December 2000 (age 25)	39	15	(The Football Association) Burnley
19	FW	Cedric Itten	27 December 1996 (age 29)	19	5	(German Football Association) Werder Bremen
11	FW	Winsley Boteli	5 July 2006 (age 20)	4	1	(Swiss Football Association) Sion
9	FW	Samuel Ballet	12 March 2001 (age 25)	2	0	(Turkish Football Federation) Amed

=== Recent call-ups ===
The following players have also been called up to the team within the last twelve months.

Pos.	Player	Date of birth (age)	Caps	Goals	Club	Latest call-up
GK	Anthony Racioppi	31 December 1998 (age 27)	0	0	(Switzerland) Sion	v. North Macedonia, 6 October 2026
DF	Miro Muheim	24 March 1998 (age 28)	13	0	(Germany) Hamburger SV	v. Slovenia, 13 November 2026 ^{INJ}
DF	Aurèle Amenda	31 July 2003 (age 23)	7	0	(England) Coventry City	v. North Macedonia, 26 September 2026 ^{INJ}
DF	Silvan Widmer ^{RET}	5 March 1993 (age 33)	65	5	(Germany) Mainz 05	2026 FIFA World Cup
DF	Luca Jaquez	2 June 2003 (age 23)	5	0	(Germany) VfB Stuttgart	2026 FIFA World Cup
MF	Granit Xhaka	27 September 1992 (age 34)	152	18	(England) Sunderland	v. Slovenia, 13 November 2026 ^{INJ}
MF	Vincent Sierro	8 October 1995 (age 31)	17	1	(Italy) Parma	v. North Macedonia, 6 October 2026
MF	Christian Fassnacht ^{RET}	11 November 1993 (age 33)	24	5	(Switzerland) Young Boys	2026 FIFA World Cup
MF	Filip Ugrinić	5 January 1999 (age 27)	4	0	(Spain) Valencia	v. Germany, 27 March 2026 ^{INJ}
FW	Joël Monteiro	5 August 1999 (age 27)	7	2	(Italy) Lecce	v. North Macedonia, 6 October 2026
FW	Noah Okafor ^{RET}	24 May 2000 (age 26)	26	2	(England) Leeds United	2026 FIFA World Cup
Notes: ^{INJ} = Not part of the current squad due to injury.; ^{INE} = Ineligible for selection.; ^{PRE} = Preliminary squad/standby.; ^{RET} = Retired from the national team.; ^{SUS} = Serving suspension.; ^{WD} = Player withdrew from the squad due to non-injury issue.

== Individual statistics ==
As of 16 November 2026
Players in bold are still active with Switzerland.

=== Most appearances ===
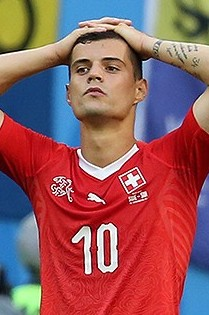
Granit Xhaka is Switzerland's most-capped player, with 152 appearances.

Rank	Player	Caps	Goals	Career
1	**Granit Xhaka**	152	18	2011–present
2	**Ricardo Rodriguez**	150	10	2011–present
3	Xherdan Shaqiri	125	32	2010–2024
4	Heinz Hermann	118	15	1978–1991
5	Alain Geiger	112	2	1980–1996
6	Stephan Lichtsteiner	108	8	2006–2019
7	Stéphane Chapuisat	103	21	1989–2004
8	**Remo Freuler**	100	12	2017–present
9	**Breel Embolo**	94	26	2015–present
9	Yann Sommer	94	0	2012–2024
9	Johann Vogel	94	2	1995–2007

=== Top goalscorers ===
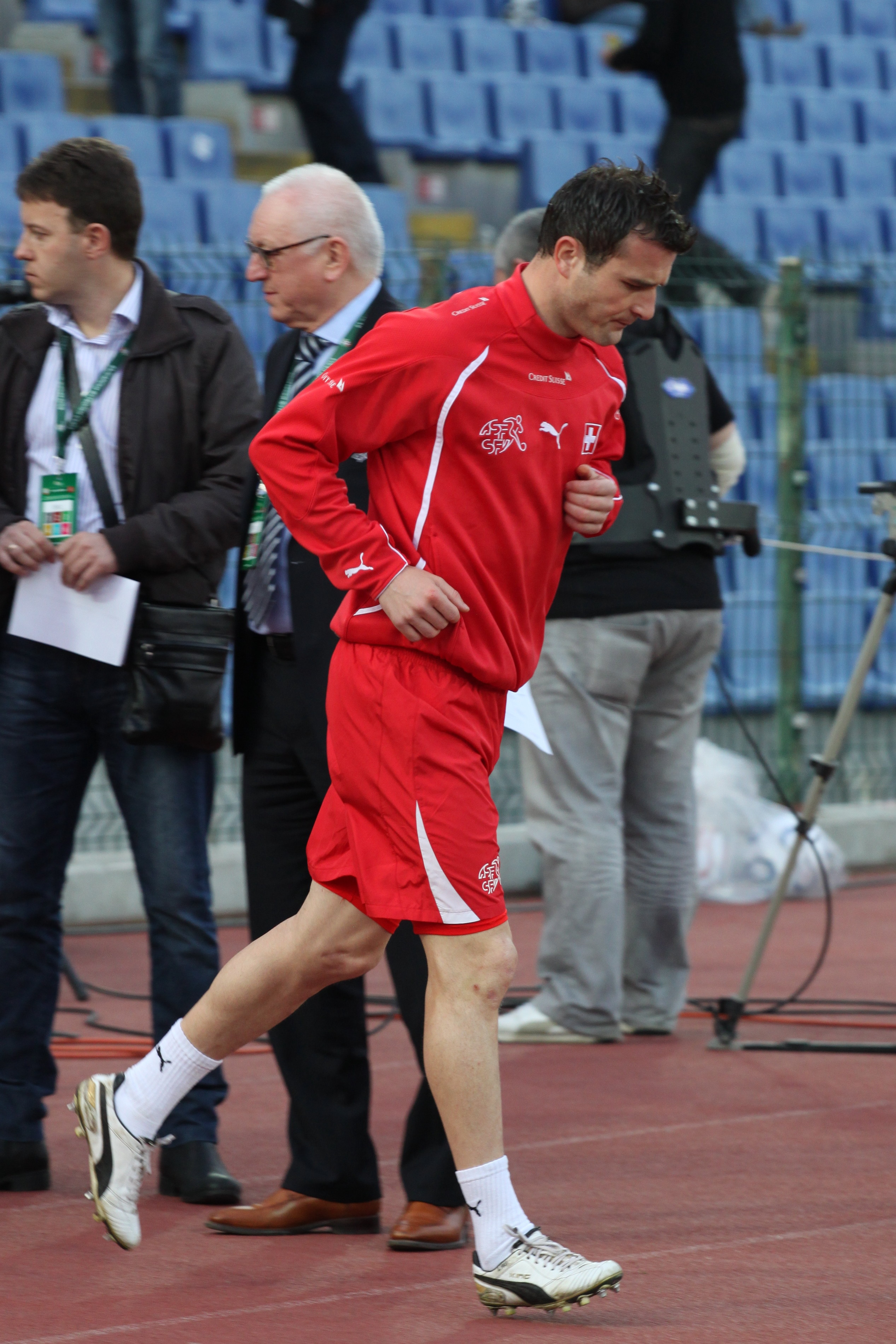
Alexander Frei is Switzerland's top scorer with 42 goals.

Rank	Player	Goals	Caps	Ratio	Career
1	Alexander Frei	42	84	0.5	2001–2011
2	Kubilay Türkyilmaz	34	64	0.53	1988–2001
2	Max Abegglen	34	68	0.5	1922–1937
4	Xherdan Shaqiri	32	125	0.26	2010–2024
5	André Abegglen	29	52	0.56	1927–1943
6	Jacques Fatton	28	53	0.53	1946–1955
7	Adrian Knup	26	49	0.53	1989–1996
7	**Breel Embolo**	26	94	0.28	2015–present
9	Haris Seferovic	25	93	0.27	2013–2023
10	Josef Hügi	22	34	0.65	1951–1961
10	Charles Antenen	22	56	0.39	1948–1962

== Competitive record ==
The best result Switzerland have achieved thus far is the quarter-finals of the World Cup on four occasions, in 1934, 1938, 1954 and 2026, while they also reached the same stage at Euro 2020 and 2024. They earned a silver medal at the 1924 Olympic Games, held in Paris, where they lost 3–0 to Uruguay in the final. This tournament, along with the 1928 edition, are considered by FIFA as World Cup finals.

=== FIFA World Cup ===
FIFA World Cup record										Qualification record					
Year	Round	Position	Pld	W	D	L	GF	GA	Squad	Pld	W	D	L	GF	GA
(Uruguay) 1930	Did not enter									Declined invitation					
(Italy) 1934	Quarter-finals	7th	2	1	0	1	5	5	Squad	2	0	2	0	4	4
(France) 1938	Quarter-finals	7th	3	1	1	1	5	5	Squad	1	1	0	0	2	1
(Brazil) 1950	Group stage	6th	3	1	1	1	4	6	Squad	2	2	0	0	8	4
(Switzerland) 1954	Quarter-finals	8th	4	2	0	2	11	11	Squad	Qualified as hosts					
(Sweden) 1958	Did not qualify									4	0	1	3	6	11
(Chile) 1962	Group stage	16th	3	0	0	3	2	8	Squad	5	4	0	1	11	10
(England) 1966	Group stage	16th	3	0	0	3	1	9	Squad	6	4	1	1	7	3
(Mexico) 1970	Did not qualify									6	2	1	3	5	8
(West Germany) 1974	Did not qualify									6	2	2	2	2	4
(Argentina) 1978	Did not qualify									4	1	0	3	3	5
(Spain) 1982	Did not qualify									8	2	3	3	9	12
(Mexico) 1986	Did not qualify									8	2	4	2	5	10
(Italy) 1990	Did not qualify									8	2	1	5	10	14
(United States) 1994	Round of 16	16th	4	1	1	2	5	7	Squad	10	6	3	1	23	6
(France) 1998	Did not qualify									8	3	1	4	11	12
(South Korea) (Japan) 2002	Did not qualify									10	4	2	4	18	12
(Germany) 2006	Round of 16	10th	4	2	2	0	4	0	Squad	12	5	6	1	22	11
(South Africa) 2010	Group stage	19th	3	1	1	1	1	1	Squad	10	6	3	1	18	8
(Brazil) 2014	Round of 16	11th	4	2	0	2	7	7	Squad	10	7	3	0	17	6
(Russia) 2018	Round of 16	14th	4	1	2	1	5	5	Squad	12	10	1	1	24	7
(Qatar) 2022	Round of 16	12th	4	2	0	2	5	9	Squad	8	5	3	0	15	2
(Canada) (Mexico) (United States) 2026	Quarter-finals	8th	6	3	2	1	10	6	Squad	6	4	2	0	14	2
(Morocco) (Portugal) (Spain) 2030	To be determined									To be determined					
(Saudi Arabia) 2034	To be determined									To be determined					
Total	Quarter-finals	13/23	47	17	10	20	65	79	—	146	72	39	35	234	152

* Draws include knockout matches decided via penalty shoot-out.
** Red border colour indicates that the tournament was held on home soil.

=== UEFA European Championship ===
UEFA European Championship record										Qualifying record					
Year	Round	Position	Pld	W	D	L	GF	GA	Squad	Pld	W	D	L	GF	GA
(France) 1960	Did not enter									Did not enter					
(Spain) 1964	Did not qualify									2	0	1	1	2	4
(Italy) 1968	Did not qualify									6	2	1	3	17	13
(Belgium) 1972	Did not qualify									6	4	1	1	12	5
(Socialist Federal Republic of Yugoslavia) 1976	Did not qualify									6	1	1	4	5	10
(Italy) 1980	Did not qualify									8	2	0	6	7	18
(France) 1984	Did not qualify									6	2	2	2	7	9
(West Germany) 1988	Did not qualify									8	1	5	2	9	9
(Sweden) 1992	Did not qualify									8	4	2	2	19	7
(England) 1996	Group stage	13th	3	0	1	2	1	4	Squad	8	5	2	1	15	7
(Belgium) (Netherlands) 2000	Did not qualify									8	4	2	2	9	5
(Portugal) 2004	Group stage	15th	3	0	1	2	1	6	Squad	8	4	3	1	15	11
(Austria) (Switzerland) 2008	Group stage	9th	3	1	0	2	3	3	Squad	Qualified as co-hosts					
(Poland) (Ukraine) 2012	Did not qualify									8	3	2	3	12	10
(France) 2016	Round of 16	11th	4	1	3	0	3	2	Squad	10	7	0	3	24	8
(Europe) 2020	Quarter-finals	7th	5	1	3	1	8	9	Squad	8	5	2	1	19	6
(Germany) 2024	Quarter-finals	6th	5	2	3	0	8	4	Squad	10	4	5	1	22	11
(United Kingdom) (Republic of Ireland) 2028	To be determined									To be determined					
(Italy) (Turkey) 2032	To be determined									To be determined					
Total	Quarter-finals	6/17	23	5	11	7	24	28	—	110	48	29	33	194	133

* Draws include knockout matches decided via penalty shoot-out.
** Red border colour indicates that the tournament was held on home soil.

=== UEFA Nations League ===
UEFA Nations League record
League phase												Finals								
Season	LG	Grp	Pos	Pld	W	D	L	GF	GA	P/R	RK	Year	Pos	Pld	W	D	L	GF	GA	Squad
2018–19	A	2	1st	4	3	0	1	14	5	Same position	1st	(Portugal) 2019	4th	2	0	1	1	1	3	Squad
2020–21	A	4	3rd	6	1	3	2	9	8	Same position	11th	(Italy) 2021	Did not qualify							
2022–23	A	2	3rd	6	3	0	3	6	9	Same position	9th	(Netherlands) 2023	Did not qualify							
2024–25	A	4	4th	6	0	2	4	6	14	▼	15th	(Germany) 2025	Did not qualify							
2026–27	B	1	1st	6	5	1	0	15	1	▲	TBD	2027	Did not qualify							
Total				28	12	6	10	50	37	1st		Total		2	0	1	1	1	3	—

* Draws include knockout matches decided via penalty shoot-out.

=== Olympic Games ===
Olympic Games record
Year	Round	Position	Pld	W	D	L	GF	GA	Squad
(France) 1924	Silver medal	2nd	6	4	1	1	15	6	Squad
(Netherlands) 1928	Round of 16	13th	1	0	0	1	0	4	Squad
Since 1992	See Switzerland national under-23 football team								
Total			7	4	1	2	15	10	—

* Draws include knockout matches decided via penalty shoot-out.

== Head-to-head record ==
As of 16 November 2026, after the match against Scotland.

Positive Record Neutral Record Negative Record

Opponents	Pld	W	D	L	GF	GA	GD
Albania	7	6	1	0	12	4	+8
Algeria	3	3	0	0	6	1	+5
Andorra	4	4	0	0	10	2	+8
Argentina	8	0	2	6	4	18	−14
Australia	2	0	2	0	1	1	0
Austria	43	12	6	25	61	106	−45
Azerbaijan	2	1	0	1	5	1	+4
Belarus	5	4	1	0	12	3	+9
Belgium	30	9	6	15	45	57	−12
Bolivia	1	0	1	0	0	0	0
Bosnia and Herzegovina	2	1	0	1	4	3	+1
Brazil	10	2	4	4	9	12	−3
Bulgaria	12	6	4	2	22	13	+9
Cameroon	2	2	0	0	2	0	+2
Canada	2	1	0	1	3	4	−1
Chile	4	2	0	2	7	7	0
China	1	1	0	0	4	1	+3
Colombia	5	1	2	2	6	9	−3
Costa Rica	3	1	1	1	4	3	+1
Croatia	4	1	2	1	7	6	+1
Cyprus	8	5	2	1	16	5	+11
Czech Republic (Note: Includes matches against Czechoslovakia.)	33	9	6	18	45	67	−22
Denmark	15	2	8	5	16	21	−5
East Germany	5	0	1	4	3	13	−10
Ecuador	1	1	0	0	2	1	+1
Egypt	1	1	0	0	3	1	+2
England	32	3	7	22	25	84	−59
England Amateurs	3	0	0	3	2	19	−17
Estonia	5	5	0	0	18	0	+18
Faroe Islands	6	6	0	0	19	2	+17
Finland	6	4	0	2	10	7	+3
France	39	12	11	16	63	70	−7
Georgia	4	3	1	0	7	1	+6
Germany (Note: Includes matches against West Germany.)	55	9	9	37	73	147	−74
Ghana	2	0	0	2	0	4	–4
Gibraltar	2	2	0	0	10	1	+9
Greece	15	9	4	2	20	12	+8
Honduras	2	1	1	0	3	0	+3
Hungary	47	12	5	30	69	132	−63
Iceland	5	4	1	0	17	6	+11
Israel	9	3	5	1	13	8	+5
Italy	62	9	24	29	70	111	−41
Ivory Coast	2	0	1	1	1	2	−1
Jamaica	2	2	0	0	3	0	+3
Japan	3	1	1	1	6	5	+1
Jordan	1	1	0	0	4	1	+3
Kenya	1	0	1	0	0	0	0
Kosovo	5	1	4	0	9	5	+4
Latvia	5	4	1	0	9	3	+6
Liechtenstein	9	9	0	0	28	1	+27
Lithuania	5	5	0	0	20	1	+19
Luxembourg	13	11	1	1	33	10	+23
Malaysia	1	1	0	0	2	0	+2
Malta	7	5	2	0	17	3	+14
Mexico	6	4	1	1	14	9	+5
Moldova	3	3	0	0	6	1	+5
Montenegro	2	1	0	1	2	1	+1
Morocco	2	0	0	2	1	3	−2
Netherlands	33	15	3	15	61	68	−7
Nigeria	1	0	0	1	0	1	−1
North Macedonia	2	2	0	0	6	0	+6
Northern Ireland	9	3	4	2	6	4	+2
Norway	20	6	6	8	20	26	−6
Oman	2	2	0	0	6	2	+4
Panama	1	1	0	0	6	0	+6
Peru	1	1	0	0	2	0	+2
Poland	11	1	6	4	12	21	−9
Portugal	26	11	5	10	35	40	–5
Qatar	2	0	1	1	1	2	−1
Republic of Ireland (Note: Includes matches against the Irish Free State.)	19	7	4	8	14	19	−5
Romania	15	4	5	6	22	19	+3
Russia (Note: Includes matches against the Soviet Union.)	12	0	4	8	11	29	−18
Saar	1	0	1	0	1	1	0
San Marino	4	4	0	0	22	0	+22
Scotland	19	7	4	8	32	27	+5
Serbia (Note: Includes matches against Yugoslavia and Serbia and Montenegro.)	17	4	6	7	22	35	−13
Slovakia	3	1	0	2	4	4	0
Slovenia	13	8	3	2	22	9	+13
South Korea	2	1	0	1	3	2	+1
Spain	27	2	6	19	24	58	−34
Sweden	31	13	7	11	48	46	+2
Togo	1	1	0	0	2	0	+2
Tunisia	3	2	1	0	4	2	+2
Turkey	16	5	3	8	23	22	+1
Ukraine	4	1	2	1	6	4	+2
United Arab Emirates	4	2	0	2	4	3	+1
United States	10	5	4	1	15	7	+8
Uruguay	4	0	1	3	4	13	−9
Venezuela	1	1	0	0	1	0	+1
Wales	8	5	1	2	17	7	+10
Zimbabwe	1	0	0	1	2	3	−1
Total (91)	897	320	206	371	1,341	1,482	−141

== Honours ==
=== Global ===
- Olympic Games
  - (silver) Silver medal (1): 1924

=== Summary ===
Competition	1st place, gold medalist(s)	2nd place, silver medalist(s)	3rd place, bronze medalist(s)	Total
Olympic Games	0	1	0	1
Total	0	1	0	1

== See also ==
- List of Switzerland international footballers
- Switzerland national under-23 football team (Switzerland Olympic team)
- Switzerland national under-21 football team
- Switzerland national under-20 football team
- Switzerland national under-19 football team
- Switzerland national under-18 football team
- Switzerland national under-17 football team
- Switzerland national under-16 football team
- Swiss Footballer of the Year
